= List of Otago representative cricketers =

List of cricketers

This is a list of cricketers who have played first-class, List A or Twenty20 cricket for the Otago cricket team. Otago played its first representative match in January 1864 against Southland, before playing the first match in New Zealand which is considered to be first-class later in the same month, a fixture against Canterbury. The team has competed for the Plunket Shield since the competition's inaugural season in 1906–07, played its first List A cricket match in 1971 and its first Twenty20 cricket match in 2006. It has played in every senior cricket competition in New Zealand. The modern Otago Cricket Association represents the regions of Otago, Southland and North Otago of New Zealand's South Island and is one of six first-class teams in the country.

Players are listed in alphabetical order. Seasons given are the first and last seasons the player played at senior level for the team. Players may not have played in every intervening season and many players will have appeared for other teams during their career.

As of 8 November 2025

== A ==
- Bruce Abernethy, 1981/82–1982/83
- Alfred Ackroyd, 1906/07
- Alan Adams, 1905/06–1907/08
- Thomas Adams, 1907/08
- Greg Aim, 1955/56
- Gren Alabaster, 1955/56–1975/76
- Jack Alabaster, 1956/57–1971/72
- Barry Allan, 1956/57 (Note: Allan played in three first-class matches for Otago, scoring 33 runs and taking three wickets. He was born at Dunedin in 1928 and died of cancer there in 1962 aged 33. He was educated at King's High School, Dunedin and worked as a salesman.)
- James Allan, 1993/94–1997/98
- Cyril Allcott, 1945/46
- John Allen, 1869/70–1874/75 (Note: Allen, who was born at Dunedin in 1850, played as a wicket-keeper in seven first-class matches for Otago as well as one other match, against a touring English team led by John Lillywhite, in 1877. He was educated at Otago Boys' High School and worked as a farmer. He died at Dunedin in 1897.)
- John Henry Allen, 1944/45 (Note: John Henry Allen (1903–1961) is only known to have played in a single cricket match in his career, a wartime first-class match between Otago and Canterbury played in February 1945. He was born and died at Dunedin and worked as an insurance agent.)
- Albert Alloo, 1914/15
- Arthur Alloo, 1913/14–1930/31
- Cecil Alloo, 1919/20–1928/29
- Geoff Anderson, 1961/62–1964/65
- Hayden Anderson, 1999/2000 (Note: Hayden Anderson played in two first-class matches for Otago in the 1999–2000 Shell Trophy, scoring 75 runs. He was born at Dunedin in 1980 and educated at Kaikorai Valley College in the city.)
- Lon Anderson, 1973/74 (Note: Lawrence "Lon" Anderson played in two List A matches for the team, scoring a total of seven runs and taking a single wicket. He had played under-23 cricket for Central Otago and Otago in the 1960s and worked as a finance manager.)
- Leslie Anderson, 1923/24 (Note: Leslie Anderson played a single match for Otago against a touring New South Wales team―the only match he is known to have played. He was born at Dunedin in 1891 and died there in 1979 aged 87. He worked as a plumber.)
- Robert Anderson, 1971/72–1976/77
- Thomas Andrew, 1872/73 (Note: Andrew, who was born in Scotland in 1843, played the only match he is known to have taken part in for Otago during the 1872–73 season. He worked as a blacksmith and died at Roxburgh in Otago in 1927.)
- Bryan Andrews, 1970/71–1973/74
- John Aris, 1870/71 (Note: Aris played a single match for Otago, scoring three runs―the only cricket match he is known to have played in. He was born at Croydon in England in 1843, worked as a printer and died at Palmerston North in 1927 aged 84.)
- Michael Austen, 1989/90–1997/98
- Gerald Austin, 1896/97–1912/13
- Tal Austin, 1877/78–1888/89
- Ma'ara Ave, 2021/22
- Francis Ayles, 1908/09

== B ==
- Matthew Bacon, 2016/17–2025/26
- Ted Badcock, 1930/31–1936/37
- Roald Badenhorst, 2014/15–2015/16
- Geoffrey Baker, 1993/94
- Henry Baker, 1925/26
- James Clark Baker, 1889/90–1906/07
- Lewis Baker, 1944/45–1945/46 (Note: Baker played in two first-class matches for Otago as well as in five of the team's non first-class matches against Southland between 1940–41 and 1945–46. He was born at Dunedin in 1920 was the director of a number of companies. He died in the city in 1997 aged 76; an obituary was published in the 1998 New Zealand Cricket Almanack.)
- Wilfred Bannerman, 1911/12–1914/15
- Warren Barnes, 2015/16–2018/19
- James Barron, 1917/18–1929/30 (Note: Barron played seven first-class matches for the team, scoring a total of 140 runs. He was born at Dunedin in 1900 and died there in 1990 aged 90, working as a warehouseman. An obituary was published in the 1991 edition of the New Zealand Cricket Almanack.)
- Peter Barton, 1964/65
- Carl Beal, 1906/07–1908/09
- William Beal, 1909/10
- Nick Beard, 2008/09–2015/16
- Simon Beare, 2001/02–2004/05
- Tom Beaton, 2016/17
- Clem Beck, 1884/85–1890/91
- Victor Beeby, 1919/20
- Gary Beer, 1965/66–1967/68
- Neil Begg, 1939/40–1940/41
- Arthur Bell, 1888/89–1893/94
- Reg Bell, 1914/15–1920/21
- Francis Bellamy, 1944/45–1945/46
- Arthur Berry, 1955/56
- Ian Billcliff, 1990/91–1994/95
- Mark Billcliff, 1998/99–2000/01
- James Black, 1895/96 (Note: Black was born at Dunedin in 1873 and educated at Otago Boys' High School in the city. He played a single match for Otago against a touring New South Wales team―the only cricket match he is known to have played. Professionally he was an accountant. He died at Auckland in 1920 aged 54.)
- Bruce Blair, 1976/77–1989/90
- James Blair, 1926/27 (Note: James Blair was born in Tasmania in 1900. He played a single match for Otago, a Plunket Shield match against Canterbury during the 1926–27 season. His nephew Roy Blair and great nephews Bruce Blair and Wayne Blair all played for Otago at senior level. Blair died at Karitane in 1961 aged 60.)
- Roy Blair, 1953/54
- Wayne Blair, 1967/68–1990/91
- Geoff Blakely, 1980/81–1984/85
- Jim Blakely, 1940/41–1950/51 (Note: Douglas James Blakely played for Otago four times in the Plunket Shield, including twice in 1950–51. He also played a number of minor association matches for South Island, Otago and Canterbury teams and in the 1963–64 Hawke Cup for North Canterbury. He was born in 1922 at Ranfurly and died at Christchurch in 1994 aged 72; obituaries were published in the 1995 editions of Wisden Cricketers' Almanack and the New Zealand Cricket Almanack. His brother John Blakely also played for Otago.)
- John Blakely, 1940/41–1946/47 (Note: John Blakely played in two first-class matches for Otago. He was born at Ranfurly in 1914, worked as a sheep farmer and died at Dunedin in 1985 aged 71. His brother Jim Blakley also played for Otago.)
- Sam Blakely, 2012/13–2014/15
- Ernest Blamires, 1923/24–1926/27
- Allan Bligh, 1989/90 (Note: Bligh, who was born at Akaroa in Canterbury in 1961 and educated at Timaru Boys' High School, played four List A matches for Otago in the 1989–90 Shell Cup. He also played a number of Hawke Cup matches for South Canterbury.)
- Roger Blunt, 1926/27–1931/32
- Henry Boddington, 1883/84–1895/96
- Stephen Boock, 1973/74–1989/90
- Joseph Borton, 1864/65–1865/66
- Graham Botting, 1953/54
- George Bottomley, 1889/90 (Note: George Robinson Bottomley played twice for the team in 1889–90, once against a touring new South Wales team and once against Canterbury. He scored a total of 14 runs with a highest score of 10. He was born at Sketlon in Yorkshire in 1846 and worked in New Zealand as a gatekeeper. His date of death is unknown.)
- A Bouch, 1876/77 (Note: Bouch is known to have only played a single cricket match, a first-class fixture between Otago and Canterbury in January 1877. He arrived in New Zealand in early 1876 and left in lae 1877 but no other biographical details are known.)
- Jack Boyle, 2025/26
- Brendon Bracewell, 1981/82–1982/83
- John Bracewell, 1978/79–1981/82
- Mark Bracewell, 1977/78
- Michael Bracewell, 2010/11–2016/17
- Dennis Brady, 1971/72 (Note: Brady, who was born at Auckland in 1951, played in two first-class matches, one for a New Zealand under-23 team in 1970–71 and one for Otago in 1971–72, scoring 47 runs against the New Zealand under-23 team. He was educated at King's High School, Dunedin and played a number of age-group matches for Otago teams.)
- Lindsay Breen, 1991/92–1997/98
- Kevin Briggs, 1959/60
- William Brinsley, 1917/18
- Charles Broad, 1897/98–1899/1900
- Darren Broom, 2009/10–2012/13
- Neil Broom, 2005/06–2021/22
- Robert Brown, 1870/71
- John Bruges, 1913/14–1914/15
- Jim Bryden, 1912/13–1913/14
- Anthony Bullick, 2007/08–2010/11
- Kevin Burns, 1980/81–1991/92
- John Burt, 1901/02–1908/09
- Ian Butler, 2008/09–2013/14
- William Butler, 1901/02
- George Butlin, 1889/90
- Thomas Butterworth, 1866/67

== C ==
- Alexander Cairns, 1867/68–1870/71
- Henry Cairns, 1864/65–1869/70
- Lance Cairns, 1976/77–1979/80
- Donald Cameron, 1930/31 (Note: Donald Cameron was born in 1908 at Dunedin, the elder brother of Harold Cameron, and educated at Otago Boys' High School in the city. He played in one first-class match, a January 1931 Plunket Shield match against Canterbury, scoring six runs and taking one wicket. He worked as a director in an insurance company and died in 1990 at Dunedin aged 82.)
- Ewen Cameron, 1953/54–1954/55
- Frank Cameron, 1952/53–1966/67
- Harold Cameron, 1939/40
- John Cameron, 1917/18
- James Campbell, 1868/69 (Note: Campbell played in Otago's 1868–69 match against Canterbury, the only first-class match played during the season. Other than his name no biographical details are known.)
- Keith Campbell, 1960/61–1978/79
- Paul Campbell, 1989/90–1996/97
- Archibald Cargill, 1876/77–1883/84
- Tom Carlton, 1920/21–1921/22
- William Carson, 1884/85–1887/88
- Leo Carter, 2024/25
- Anthony Cartwright, 1961/62–1963/64
- Leonard Casey, 1920/21–1922/23
- Vic Cavanagh, 1927/28–1938/39
- Charles Chadwick, 1911/12–1924/25
- Leslie Chadwick, 1919/20
- Robert Chadwick, 1904/05
- Martin Chapman, 1864/65–1867/68
- Reginald Cherry, 1919/20–1931/32
- Tom Chettleburgh, 1932/33–1940/41
- Max Chu, 2018/19–2025/26
- Basil Church, 1871/72
- Daniel Claffey, 1888/89–1889/90
- Alan Clark, 1958/59–1959/60
- Barney Clark, 1929/30
- Bernie Clark, 1933/34–1934/35
- George Clark, 1872/73–1879/80
- Alfred Clarke, 1893/94–1898/99
- Mason Clarke, 2024/25 (Note: Clarke, who was born in 2007 and educated at Wakatipu High School in Queenstown, made his Otago debut in the 2024–25 Super Smash, opening the bowling and taking one wicket at the age of 17. A right-arm pace bowler, he played age-group cricket for the provincial team and played for New Zealand under-19s in the 2024 Under-19 Cricket World Cup.)
- Frank Clayton, 1892/93–1896/97
- Ruben Clinton, 2024/25 (Note: Clinton, a batting all-rounder from Taieri Cricket Club in Mosgiel, made his debut in the 2024–25 Super Smash, taking one wicket in a rain-affected match against Auckland at Alexandra in December 2024. Although he was born at Fort Worth in the United States, he grew up with his South African family in the remote mining town of Thabazimbi before moving to New Zealand at the age of 10. He played Hawke Cup cricket for Hamilton and A team matches for Auckland before making his Twenty20 debut for MI New York in American Major League Cricket in 2024. He moved to Otago ahead of the 2024–25 season.)
- Tommy Clout, 2018/19–2019/20
- Edward Collinson, 1868/69–1885/86
- James Condliffe, 1909/10–1913/14
- Bevan Congdon, 1972/73–1973/74
- Norris Conradi, 1917/18–1925/26
- John Conway, 1879/80
- Frank Cooke, 1879/80–1884/85
- Richard Coulstock, 1863/64
- Robert Couper, 1951/52
- Robert Coupland, 1930/31–1932/33
- Ben Cox, 2018/19
- Keith Cox, 1933/34
- Mark Craig, 2008/09–2018/19
- Albert Cramond, 1904/05
- Jack Crawford, 1914/15
- William Crawshaw, 1877/78–1883/84
- Michael Creagh, 1866/67
- Gregor Croudis, 2016/17
- James Croxford, 1890/91–1893/94
- Martyn Croy, 1994/95–2001/02
- Charles Crump, 1864/65–1867/68
- Craig Cumming, 2000/01–2011/12
- Jacob Cumming, 2021/22–2024/25 (Note: The son of Craig Cumming and older brother of Zac Cumming, Jacob Cumming made his Otago debut as a batsman during the 2021/22 season. Born at Dunedin in 2003, he was educated at Otago Boys' High School and played age-group and A team cricket for Otago from 2018/19.)
- Zac Cumming, 2024/25 (Note: The son of Craig Cumming and younger brother of Jacob Cumming, Zac Cumming made his Otago debut as a leg-spin bowler during November 2024. Born at Dunedin in 2005, he was educated at Otago Boys' High School and played age-group and A team cricket for Otago from 2021/22 and for the New Zealand under-19 team during 2023/24.)
- Edwin Cummings, 1909/10–1910/11
- George Cummings, 1902/03–1904/05
- Ernest Currie, 1893/94–1894/95
- John Cushen, 1967/68–1986/87
- Arthur Cutler, 1938/39–1946/47

== D ==
- John D'Arcy, 1960/61–1961/62
- Robert Davenport, 1881/82–1883/84
- Chris Davies, 1998/99 (Note: A left-handed batsman born at Nelson in 1980, Davies played two first-class matches for Otago, scoring 27 runs.)
- Alexander Dawes, 1884/85–1894/95
- Garth Dawson, 1980/81–1984/85
- Derek de Boorder, 2007/08–2017/18
- Artie Dick, 1956/57–1960/61
- Carl Dickel, 1970/71–1982/83
- Thomas Dickel, 1917/18
- George Dickinson, 1921/22–1937/38
- Bill Ditchfield, 1933/34
- William Dixon, 1875/76–1885/86
- Peter Dobbs, 1988/89–1994/95
- William Douglas, 1878/79
- William Mackie Douglas, 1922/23–1928/29
- Alexander Downes, 1887/88–1913/14
- William Downes, 1865/66–1875/76
- Arthur Drabble, 1884/85–1891/92
- Duncan Drew, 2000/01–2001/02
- Jacob Duffy, 2011/12–2024/25
- Ryan Duffy, 2013/14–2016/17
- Hugh Duncan, 1921/22–1924/25
- Stuart Duncan, 1925/26–1940/41
- Steve Dunne, 1968/69
- Desmond Dunnet, 1950/51
- Jack Dunning, 1923/24–1937/38
- Ernest Duret, 1889/90

== E ==
- Laurie Eastman, 1927/28–1928/29
- Sean Eathorne, 2004/05–2016/17
- Albertus Eckhoff, 1899/1900–1914/15
- Lawrence Eckhoff, 1975/76
- Alfred Eckhold, 1906/07–1921/22
- Mervyn Edmunds, 1958/59–1959/60
- Stewart Edward, 1966/67–1967/68
- Allan Edwards, 1939/40–1940/41
- Cedric Elmes, 1940/41
- Olaf Everson, 1943/44

== F ==
- Paul Facoory, 1974/75–1984/85
- Andrew Fairbairn, 1884/85
- Fairfax Fenwick, 1875/76
- Danru Ferns, 2025/26
- Christopher Finch, 1993/94–1995/96
- Steven Finn, 2011/12
- Josh Finnie, 2014/15–2022/23
- Arthur Fisher, 1890/91–1909/10
- James Fitzgerald, 1883/84–1884/85
- Shaun Fitzgibbon, 2014/15
- John Flaherty, 1964/65–1968/69
- Tom Flaws, 1952/53–1962/63
- Simon Forde, 1998/99–2000/01
- George Fox, 1888/89–1889/90
- Dean Foxcroft, 2019/20–2024/25
- William Frame, 1955/56–1957/58
- Ian Fraser, 1918/19
- Thomas Fraser, 1937/38–1952/53
- Barry Freeman, 1969/70–1970/71
- Thomas Freeman, 1943/44–1949/50
- Tipene Friday, 2014/15
- Charlie Frith, 1881/82–1889/90
- William Frith, 1881/82
- James Fuller, 2009/10–2012/13
- Frederick Fulton, 1868/69–1878/79
- James Fulton, 1863/64–1867/68
- John Fulton, 1867/68–1874/75

== G ==
- Chris Gaffaney, 1995/96–2006/07
- Aaron Gale, 1989/90–1999/2000
- Alexander Gale, 1929/30 (Note: Gale was born at Glasgow in Scotland in 1892 and educated at Otago Boys' High School in Dunedin. He played for a North Otago team against a touring New South Wales team in 1924 and made his only first-class appearance in a Plunket Shield match for Otago against Canterbury in February 1930. He worked as a clerk and died at Dunedin in 1965.)
- Arthur Galland, 1914/15–1930/31
- Iain Gallaway, 1946/47–1947/48
- Walter Garwood, 1873/74
- Clive Geary, 1940/41
- Albert Geddes, 1899/1900–1903/04
- Luke Georgeson, 2023/24–2025/26
- Lee Germon, 2000/01–2001/02
- Jake Gibson, 2021/22–2024/25
- Alex Gidman, 2007/08
- Alan Gilbertson, 1951/52–1953/54
- Leslie Giles, 1929/30
- James Gill, 1953/54–1963/64
- Andrew Given, 1914/15
- James Glasgow, 1866/67–1868/69
- Adam Glen, 1872/73–1886/87
- Harry Godby, 1874/75–1875/76
- Michael Godby, 1875/76
- William Gollar, 1890/91
- William Gough, 1953/54
- Archibald Graham, 1944/45
- Colin Graham, 1954/55–1955/56
- Harry Graham, 1903/04–1906/07
- Laurie Green, 1926/27 (Note: An Australian, Green played in two of Otago's three Plunket Shield matches in 1926–27, both over the Christmas and New Year period. He was the wicket-keeper in both matches but after breaking a rib in the second match was replaced in the team by Arthur Symonds. He is believed to have arrived from Australia during 1926 but no other biographical details are known and CricInfo identifies him only as L Green.)
- Andrew Grieve, 1884/85–1887/88
- Les Groves, 1929/30–1949/50
- Henry Gunthorp, 1902/03
- John Guy, 1959/60

== H ==
- Walter Hadlee, 1945/46–1946/47
- Frederick Haig, 1919/20
- Shaun Haig, 2005/06–2010/11
- William Haig, 1949/50–1957/58
- Ronald Haley, 1970/71
- Peter Hall, 1955/56
- John Harkness, 1897/98–1900/01
- Frederick Harper, 1886/87–1894/95
- Anthony Harris, 2005/06
- Ben Harris, 1989/90–1990/91
- John Hyde Harris, 1865/66
- Leonard Harris, 1881/82–1887/88
- Ben Hart, 1997/98 (Note: Hart, who was born at Hamilton in 1977, kept wicket for Otago in one first-class match, scoring a single run and taking five catches. He had previously played for Northern Districts age-group and second XI teams.)
- Toby Hart, 2024/25 (Note: Hart, a right-arm medium pace bowler, made his debut in a November 2024 List A fixture following a series of injuries to fast bowlers in the Otago squad. He had impressed after taking 11 wickets in a match for Otago A the previous month. He took one wicket on debut. Born at Auckland in 2003 and educated at Wakatipu High School in Queenstown, Hart played age-group cricket for Otago and Hawke Cup cricket for Otago Country.)
- Matt Harvie, 2003/04–2009/10
- Robert Harwood, 1944/45–1945/46
- Oscar Haskell, 1877/78–1889/90
- Cam Hawkins, 2018/19–2020/21
- William Hawksworth, 1929/30–1933/34
- Arthur Hay, 1917/18
- William Haydon, 1895/96–1897/98
- Andrew Hazeldine, 2022/23–2024/25
- Donald Heenan, 1928/29–1929/30
- Ames Hellicar, 1872/73
- Norman Henderson, 1935/36
- Bill Hendley, 1864/65–1872/73
- Russell Hendry, 1961/62–1973/74
- Graham Henry, 1967/68
- Paul Henry, 1996/97 (Note: Henry, who was born at Mataura in Southland in 1970, played twice for the team as a wicket-keeper, scoring a total of nine runs and taking six catches. He was educated at St Peter's College, Gore and played Hawke Cup cricket for Southland between 1989–90 and 1992–93. He later worked as a real estate agent.)
- Robert Hewat, 1889/90
- Shawn Hicks, 2017/18–2018/19
- Syd Hiddleston, 1909/10
- William Higgins, 1910/11–1920/21
- John Hill, 1961/62–1962/63
- Robert Hill, 1976/77–1989/90
- Peter Hills, 1978/79–1989/90
- Simon Hinton, 1994/95
- Kyle Hogg, 2006/07
- William Holdaway, 1918/19
- Allen Holden, 1937/38–1939/40
- William Holden, 1917/18–1918/19
- Jason Holder, 2013/14
- Henry Holderness, 1918/19
- Lewis Hollands, 1969/70–1971/72
- Robert Holloway, 1961/62–1964/65
- Allan Holmes, 1870/71–1873/74
- John Hope, 1885/86–1899/1900
- John Hayhurst Hope, 1863/64–1866/67
- Cyril Hopkins, 1908/09–1912/13
- Gareth Hopkins, 2003/04–2006/07
- Andrew Hore, 1996/97–2004/05
- Matt Horne, 1996/97–2000/01
- Richard Hoskin, 1980/81–1992/93
- Ernest Howden, 1902/03–1908/09
- Peter Howden, 1937/38
- James Hume, 1880/81
- Raymond Hunt, 1947/48–1953/54
- David Hunter, 1989/90–1991/92
- Jack Hunter, 2015/16–2018/19
- John Huntley, 1912/13
- James Hussey, 1902/03
- Frank Hutchison, 1917/18–1919/20
- Raymond Hutchison, 1965/66–1971/72

== J ==
- John Jacomb, 1863/64
- Stanley James, 1953/54
- Robin Jefferson, 1965/66
- Louis Joel, 1899/1900
- Llew Johnson, 2017/18–2025/26
- Troy Johnson, 2025/26
- Vaughn Johnson, 1984/85–1990/91
- Robert Johnston, 1872/73–1873/74
- William Johnston, 1889/90–1902/03
- John Jolly, 1933/34
- Glenn Jonas, 1998/99–1999/2000
- Andrew Jones, 1983/84–1984/85
- Raymond Jones, 1982/83
- Stuart Jones, 1953/54
- Tom Jones, 2025/26

== K ==
- Albert Keast, 1917/18–1923/24
- Nick Kelly, 2019/20–2021/22
- Graham Kemp, 1987/88 (Note: Kemp played age-group and Second XI cricket for Otago, but only appeared once for the First XI, playing in a match against a touring Queensland team in December 1987. He took one wicket and scored a single run. He was born at Dunedin in 1962.)
- Robert Kennedy, 1993/94–1997/98
- John Kenny, 1911/12
- Frank Kerr, 1934/35–1936/37
- Charles Kettle, 1868/69–1871/72
- Kassem Ibadulla, 1982/83–1990/91
- Khalid Ibadulla, 1964/65–1966/67
- William Kilgour, 1901/02–1907/08
- Hunter Kindley, 2022/23–2024/25 (Note: Kindley made his debut for Otago in a List A match against Wellington in February 2023. He neither batted or bowled in the match but did take a catch. He was born at Dunedin in 1999 and educated at Otago Boys' High School in the city, playing school cricket and matches for Otago age-group teams. He made his first-class debut for the representative team in a November 2024 fixture against Central Districts. Opening the batting, he recorded a duck in his first innings and scored four runs in his second innings.)
- Richard King, 1991/92–1995/96
- Thomas Kingsland, 1886/87
- Alfred Kinvig, 1893/94–1898/99
- Christopher Kirk, 1977/78
- Anaru Kitchen, 2015/16–2021/22
- Arthur Kitt, 1886/87
- Bradley Kneebone, 2024/25 (Note: Kneebone made his first-class debut for Otago against Canterbury in December 2024 as a concussion substitute, replacing wicket-keeper Max Chu for the final innings of the match and taking a single catch. Born in 1993, Kneebone had previously played Hawke Cup cricket for Northland and A team matches for Northern Districts and Otago. His father, Ross Kneebone, made two List A appearances for Northern Districts during the 1992/93 season.)
- Alec Knight, 1918/19–1943/44
- Ernest Kruskopf, 1944/45
- Nick Kwant, 2022/23

== L ==
- Sydney Lambert, 1873/74–1874/75
- Michael Lamont, 1990/91–1998/99
- William Lathbury, 1875/76
- Noel Lawson, 1944/45
- Robbie Lawson, 1992/93–2003/04
- Joseph Lawton, 1890/91–1893/94
- VVS Laxman, 2008/09
- Vernon Leader, 1928/29–1940/41
- Brett Lee, 2012/13
- Warren Lees, 1971/72–1987/88
- John Leith, 1880/81
- George Lemin, 1929/30–1939/40
- Frederick Liggins, 1896/97–1900/01
- John Lindsay, 1980/81–1991/92
- Thomas Livingston, 1917/18
- Dion Lobb, 2006/07
- Ben Lockrose, 2017/18–2025/26
- Arthur Lomas, 1919/20
- Robert Long, 1953/54–1963/64
- G Lynch, 1873/74 (Note: Lynch is known to have played in a single match, a first-class fixture against Canterbury in the 1873–74 season, scoring 51 runs in his only innings. No other biographical details are known.)

== M ==
- Lynn McAlevey, 1975/76
- Vernon McArley, 1947/48–1957/58
- Charlie Macartney, 1909/10
- Dan McBeath, 1917/18–1922/23
- Vincent McCarten, 1944/45
- Mitchell McClenaghan, 2020/21
- Arthur MacCormick, 1888/89
- Brendon McCullum, 1999/2000–2014/15
- Nathan McCullum, 1999/2000–2015/16
- Stuart McCullum, 1976/77–1990/91
- Colin McDonald, 1968/69
- F MacDonald, 1863/64 (Note: MacDonald, who was born in Victoria, Australia, played in a single first-class match, scoring 12 runs and taking 10 wickets, including a five-wicket haul, against Canterbury in January 1864—the first cricket match to be played in New Zealand which has been accorded first-class status. Later in the year he played three other matches against an English touring team led by George Parr, two for Otago XIs and one for a combined Otago and Canterbury team. No other biographical details are known.)
- Randell McDonnell, 1867/68–1875/76
- Bill McDougall, 1944/45–1946/47
- Christopher Mace, 1863/64
- John Mace, 1863/64
- Murray McEwan, 1957/58
- James MacFarlane, 1886/87–1889/90
- Thomas MacFarlane, 1870/71–1873/74
- Thomas Albert McFarlane, 1909/10–1919/20
- Peter McGlashan, 2002/03
- Gordon McGregor, 1935/36–1939/40
- J McGregor, 1884/85 (Note: McGregor played in all three of Otago's first-class matches in 1884–85, scoring a total of 76 runs with a highest score of 30 not out. He is known to have played in one other match, an 1882 fixture against a touring English team led by Alfred Shaw. No other biographical details are known.)
- Noel McGregor, 1947/48–1968/69
- James McHaffie, 1931/32
- Scott McHardy, 1991/92–1992/93
- Jarrod McKay, 2020/21–2025/26
- Brian McKechnie, 1971/72–1985/86
- Don McKechnie, 1975/76–1980/81
- Angus McKenzie, 2019/20–2021/22
- John McKenzie, 1893/94–1894/95 (Note: John McKenzie played in three first-class matches for Otago, two in 1893–94 and one the following season. He scored a total of 116 runs, including 74 against Hawke's Bay in his second match. He also played in a match not considered first-class against Southland in 1893–94. Other than his name, no biographical details are known.)
- Michael MacKenzie, 1992/93
- Marcel McKenzie, 2002/03–2007/08
- Norman McKenzie, 1972/73
- William Mackersy, 1906/07–1907/08
- Kenneth McKnight, 1987/88–1991/92
- Stewart McKnight, 1958/59–1966/67
- Duncan McLachlan, 1912/13
- William McLennan, 1879/80 (Note: A fast bowler, McLennan played a single match for the team in 1879–80. He took six wickets against Canterbury, including a five-wicket haul in the first innings of the match. Other than that he worked as a baker, no biographical details are known.)
- James McMillan, 2000/01–2014/15
- John McMullan, 1917/18–1929/30
- Hugh MacNeil, 1877/78–1893/94
- Warren McSkimming, 1999/2000–2011/12
- Henry Maddock, 1863/64–1869/70
- Walter Malcolm, 1914/15
- John Mallard, 1882/83–1884/85
- Neil Mallender, 1983/84–1992/93
- Evan Marshall, 1991/92–2001/02
- Peter Marshall, 1991/92
- George Martin, 1908/09
- Wayne Martin, 1976/77–1978/79
- Dimitri Mascarenhas, 2008/09–2011/12
- Ata Matatumua, 1966/67–1967/68
- Stephen Mather, 1998/99–1999/2000
- Russell Mawhinney, 1990/91–1991/92
- Robert Maxwell, 1970/71
- Matthew Maynard, 1996/97–1997/98
- William Meares, 1873/74–1876/77
- Barry Milburn, 1963/64–1982/83
- Adam Miles, 2015/16
- Gordon Millington, 1876/77–1880/81
- Arthur Mills, 1947/48
- George Mills, 1900/01–1902/03
- George Henry Mills, 1935/36–1957/58
- Leslie Milnes, 1944/45–1948/49
- D Mitchell, 1881/82–1882/83 (Note: Mitchell, who was born at Southend-on-Sea in England, was the wicket-keeper in Otago's only first-class matches in the 1881–82 and 1882–83 seasons, both played against Canterbury. Mitchell scored 37 runs and was responsible for eight dismissals during the matches, seven catches and one stumping. He lived at Invercargill, where he played club cricket, before moving to Victoria, Australia in 1883 where he may have played for Carlton Cricket Club's Second XI.)
- John Mitchell, 1968/69
- Alex Moir, 1949/50–1961/62
- Sonny Moloney, 1929/30–1939/40
- Leonard Monk, 1901/02
- Philip Monk, 1928/29–1929/30
- Alastair Monteath, 1939/40
- James Moore, 1905/06
- Leighton Morgan, 2007/08–2009/10
- Nathan Morland, 1996/97–2003/04
- Alexander Morris, 1884/85
- Charles Morris, 1863/64
- Philip Morris, 1975/76–1976/77
- Henry Morrison, 1880/81
- William Morrison, 1876/77–1880/81
- Frederick Muir, 1872/73
- Murray Muir, 1949/50
- Edward Mulcock, 1943/44
- Travis Muller, 2019/20–2024/25
- Donald Murdoch, 1943/44–1944/45
- Geoffrey Murdoch, 1974/75
- Ronald Murdoch, 1964/65
- William Murison, 1864/65–1866/67
- John Murtagh, 1988/89

== N ==
- Dirk Nannes, 2014/15
- Chris Nash, 2010/11
- Dion Nash, 1992/93–1993/94
- James Neesham, 2011/12–2017/18
- James Nelson, 1914/15
- Peter Neutze, 1984/85
- Joseph Nichols, 1876/77
- Kenneth Nicholson, 1971/72–1972/73
- Ross Nicholson, 1963/64
- Victor Nicholson, 1914/15
- Rob Nicol, 2017/18
- John Nimmo, 1933/34–1936/37
- Robert Niven, 1877/78–1888/89
- Kieran Noema-Barnett, 2006/07

== O ==
- Kevin O'Connor, 1969/70–1970/71
- Shayne O'Connor, 1994/95–2002/03
- Thomas O'Connor, 2024/25–2025/26
- Karl O'Dowda, 1991/92–2000/01
- Geoffrey Osborne, 1977/78–1981/82
- John O'Sullivan, 1946/47–1947/48
- Guy Overton, 1945/46–1955/56

== P ==
- George Paramor, 1873/74–1880/81
- Mark Parker, 1996/97
- Murray Parker, 1967/68–1969/70
- Thomas Parker, 1864/65–1866/67
- William Parker, 1880/81–1896/97
- Thorn Parkes, 2021/22–2025/26
- Gordon Patrick, 1918/19
- Bill Patrick, 1917/18
- Justin Paul, 1992/93–1994/95
- Ian Payne, 1947/48–1951/52
- Walter Pearless, 1904/05
- Lance Pearson, 1961/62–1970/71
- Peter Petherick, 1975/76–1977/78
- Dale Phillips, 2019/20–2024/25
- Glenn Phillips, 2022/23–2024/25
- Rhys Phillips, 2014/15–2016/17
- Graeme Powell, 1969/70–1977/78
- Michael Powell, 2005/06
- William Priest, 1931/32–1932/33
- Raymond Procter, 1960/61
- Robert Prouting, 1969/70
- Craig Pryor, 2000/01–2001/02
- John Purdue, 1938/39

== R ==
- Michael Rae, 2014/15–2022/23
- Ben Raine, 2018/19
- Albert Rains, 1894/95–1896/97
- John Ramsden, 1909/10–1914/15
- Charles Rattray, 1883/84–1896/97
- George Rayner, 1887/88
- Lawrence Reade, 1870/71–1876/77
- George Reardon, 1903/04
- Daryll Reddington, 2002/03 (Note: Reddington was born at Queenstown in 1972. He played twice for Dunedin Metropolitan in the 1999–00 Hawke Cup before making a single first-class appearance for Otago in 2002–03, taking a single wicket. He has since worked as a schoolteacher.)
- James Redfearn, 1863/64
- Aaron Redmond, 2004/05–2014/15
- Darron Reekers, 1997/98
- Mitch Renwick, 2018/19–2021/22
- John Reid, 1956/57–1957/58
- David Rhodes, 1874/75
- Hiram Rhodes, 1872/73–1876/77
- Simon Richards, 1983/84–1984/85
- H Richardson, 1865/66 (Note: Richardson played in only one first-class match, a fixture against Canterbury in February 1866. This was the third first-class match to be played in New Zealand and the only one played during the 1865–66 season. He scored 33 runs and took four wickets. He attended Blackheath Proprietary School in England but no other biographical details are known.)
- Mark Richardson, 1992/93–2000/01
- Michael Rippon, 2016/17–2022/23
- Alby Roberts, 1944/45–1950/51
- Gordon Robertson, 1937/38–1940/41
- Iain Robertson, 2010/11–2014/15
- William Robertson, 1960/61
- Ray Robinson, 1946/47–1948/49
- Shane Robinson, 1984/85–1996/97
- Bradley Rodden, 2013/14–2014/15
- Henry Rose, 1876/77–1883/84
- Robert Roy, 1970/71–1971/72
- Neil Rushton, 1999/2000–2003/04
- Hamish Rutherford, 2008/09–2023/24
- Ian Rutherford, 1974/75–1983/84
- Ken Rutherford, 1982/83–1994/95
- Robert Rutherford, 1908/09–1913/14
- Jesse Ryder, 2013/14–2014/15

== S ==
- Douglas St. John, 1946/47–1950/51
- Matthew Sale, 1997/98
- George Sampson, 1874/75
- Henry Sampson, 1973/74–1975/76
- Mervyn Sandri, 1956/57
- Charles Saxton, 1934/35–1938/39
- John Scandrett, 1935/36–1943/44
- Bradley Scott, 2000/01–2016/17
- Peter Semple, 1961/62–1971/72
- David Sewell, 1995/96–2005/06
- Dayle Shackel, 1993/94
- Frank Shacklock, 1903/04–1904/05
- Gareth Shaw, 2005/06
- Jordan Sheed, 2001/02–2008/09
- James Shepherd, 1912/13–1930/31
- Cliff Shirley, 1945/46
- Harry Siedeberg, 1898/99–1921/22
- Ron Silver, 1935/36–1945/46
- Peter Skelton, 1953/54
- Bill Skitch, 1883/84
- Craig Smith, 2004/05–2015/16
- Dennis Smith, 1931/32–1932/33
- James Smith, 1914/15–1921/22
- Lankford Smith, 1934/35–1956/57
- Nathan Smith, 2015/16–2020/21
- Nicholas Smith, 1969/70
- Rhiane Smith, 1992/93–1995/96
- Robert Smith, 2001/02
- William Somerville, 2004/05–2007/08
- Thomas Sonntag, 1883/84
- Blair Soper, 2012/13–2019/20
- Ralph Spraggon, 1894/95–1896/97
- John Spring, 1877/78–1884/85
- Frederick Stanley, 1950/51–1953/54
- Frederick Stephenson, 1890/91
- Darren Stevens, 2010/11
- Raymond Stewart, 1963/64–1968/69
- Russell Stewart, 1973/74–1977/78
- Walter Strang, 1929/30
- Henry Stronach, 1892/93–1894/95
- Bert Sutcliffe, 1946/47–1961/62
- H Sutcliffe, 1875/76 (Note: Sutcliffe was a left-handed batsman and medium-fast bowler who had been born in Lancashire in England. He scored two runs in his only first-class match, a January 1876 fixture against Canterbury. He is also known to have played in non-first-class matches against two touring teams, one an English team led by James Lillywhite in 1877 and the other a touring Australian team in 1878.)
- Trevor Sutherland, 1979/80
- Arthur Symonds, 1926/27

== T ==
- William Tait, 1872/73–1874/75
- Ron Talbot, 1933/34–1935/36
- Josh Tasman-Jones, 2016/17–2021/22
- Ryan ten Doeschate, 2012/13–2014/15
- Neale Thompson, 1956/57–1962/63
- Graeme Thomson, 1973/74–1980/81
- James Thomson, 1873/74
- Greg Todd, 2004/05–2009/10
- Jamal Todd, 2023/24–2025/26
- Cecil Toomey, 1939/40–1945/46
- Francis Toomey, 1934/35–1935/36
- Richard Torrance, 1905/06–1927/28
- Sean Tracy, 1990/91
- Jonathan Trott, 2005/06
- Bertie Tuckwell, 1912/13–1914/15
- Albert Turnbull, 1896/97
- Percival Turnbull, 1884/85
- Glenn Turner, 1964/65–1982/83
- Nicholas Turner, 2006/07–2007/08
- Gibson Turton, 1863/64–1871/72

== U ==
- Kenneth Uttley, 1933/34–1938/39

== V ==
- Henry Vallange, 1886/87
- John Vear, 1959/60–1960/61
- John Veitch, 1957/58–1963/64
- Edward Vernon, 1878/79–1879/80
- Christi Viljoen, 2015/16–2018/19
- William Vorrath, 1927/28–1929/30

== W ==
- Neil Wagner, 2008/09–2017/18
- Scott Waide, 2001/02
- Derek Walker, 1980/81–1988/89
- John Walls, 1886/87
- Kerry Walmsley, 2000/01–2002/03
- Ivan Walsh, 1948/49–1949/50
- Mohammad Wasim, 2002/03–2004/05
- Eric Watson, 1947/48–1959/60
- Harold Watson, 1907/08–1914/15
- Leo Watson, 1911/12
- Leonard Watson, 1953/54
- David Watt, 1943/44
- Les Watt, 1943/44–1962/63
- Murray Webb, 1969/70–1973/74
- Richard Webb, 1974/75–1983/84
- William Webb, 1897/98–1900/01
- Rudi Webster, 1966/67–1967/68
- Frank Wells, 1895/96–1896/97
- Sam Wells, 2007/08–2016/17
- Roy Westbrook, 1914/15–1921/22
- Beckham Wheeler-Greenall, 2021/22
- Ollie White, 2023/24
- John Wilkie, 1901/02
- Robert Wilkie, 1899/1900
- Anthony Wilkinson, 2001/02–2002/03
- Arnold Williams, 1886/87–1894/95
- Frank Williams, 1898/99–1908/09
- Gary Williams, 1975/76–1977/78
- JW Wills, 1869/70 (Note: Wills played his only first-class match against Canterbury in December 1869, scoring a single run. He had played a non-first-class match for Canterbury in 1864 against a touring English team led by George Parr. He is also known to have umpired first-class matches. No other biographical details are known.)
- Brad Wilson, 2015/16–2018/19
- Charles Wilson, 1905/06–1911/12
- Ernest Wilson, 1927/28
- Jeff Wilson, 1991/92–2005/06
- John Wilson, 1982/83–1988/89
- Robert Wilson, 1971/72–1978/79
- Paul Wiseman, 1994/95–2000/01
- Richard Wixon, 1993/94–1994/95
- Norman Woods, 1958/59–1965/66
- Charles Wordsworth, 1908/09–1909/10
- Rupert Worker, 1923/24–1925/26
- Charles Worthington, 1864/65–1865/66
- William Wyinks, 1882/83–1885/86

== Y ==
- Yasir Arafat, 2009/10

== Z ==
- Carl Zimmerman, 1925/26–1929/30

== Bibliography ==
- McCarron, Tony (2010). New Zealand Cricketers 1863/64–2010. Cardiff: The Association of Cricket Statisticians and Historians. ISBN 978 1 905138 98 2
