= Thomas Geary =

Thomas Geary may refer to:

- Thomas J. Geary (1854–1929), U.S. Representative from California
- Thomas Augustine Geary (1775–1801), Irish composer, pianist and organist
- T. Mayo Geary, American songwriter, composer, vaudeville performer, and music publishing executive
- Clive Geary (Thomas Francis Clive Geary, 1922–2004), New Zealand cricketer
