= Lindsay Breen =

New Zealand cricketer (born 1971)

Personal information
- Full name: Lindsay Charles Breen
- Born: 16 July 1971 (age 55); Alexandra, New Zealand
- Batting: Right-handed

Domestic team information
- Years: Team
- 1991/92–1997/98: Otago
- 1995/96: Central Otago
- Source: ESPNcricinfo, 6 May 2016

Lindsay Breen (born 16 July 1971) is a New Zealand former cricketer. He played eight first-class matches for Otago in the 1993–94 and 1994–95 seasons and appeared in 20 List A matches for the team between 1991–92 and 1997–98.

Breen was born at Alexandra in Central Otago and educated at Southland Boys' High School in Invercargill. Professionally he has worked as a human resources consultant, as the Managing Director of The Breen Construction Company and as the directors of a property company in Alexandra. He has three children.

After playing age-group cricket for Otago during the 1989–90 season, Breen made his senior debut for Otago in December 1991 in a List A match against Central Districts but was out first ball and not recalled to the team until the 1993–94 season. He played most of his senior cricket during the following three seasons, making his first-class debut in January 1994 and scoring his only senior century in March of the same year in a first-class match against a New Zealand Academy team at Molyneux Park in Alexandra, an innings which has been described as the "highlight" of his career. He played for Central Otago during the 1995–96 Hawke Cup team and later captained the team, before playing a final List A match in January 1998, recording a duck again at Molyneux Park.

Breen has been a long-standing member of the Otago Country Cricket Association's committee and has served as chairman. He has been instrumental in maintaining the senior status of Molyneux Park, working with fellow former Otago player Shayne O'Connor and was elected as a life member of the Association in 2020.
