= Skitch =

Skitch may refer to:

- Skitching, hitching a ride on a car's bumper while skateboarding, or in the snow
- Jeffrey Skitch (1927–2013), Australian-British singer, actor and teacher
- Bill Skitch (1860–1944), New Zealand cricketer
- Skitch Henderson (1918–2005), American pianist, conductor, and composer
- Mr. Skitch, a 1933 American comedy film
- A screenshot editing and sharing utility, part of the Evernote app

== See also ==
- Skitchin', a 1994 racing video game
