= Shane Robinson =

Shane Robinson may refer to:

- Charles Shane Robinson (born 1964), American referee
- Shane Robinson (footballer) (born 1980), Irish football midfielder
- Shane Robinson (politician) (born 1976), American politician in Maryland
- Shane Robinson (baseball) (born 1984), American baseball center fielder
- Shane Robinson (cricketer) (born 1967), New Zealand cricketer
