= Ron Silver (disambiguation) =

Ron Silver (1946–2009) was an American actor and activist.

Ron Silver may also refer to:

- Ron Silver (cricketer) (1910–1984), New Zealand cricketer
- Ron Silver (ice hockey) (1907–1993), Canadian defenceman
- Ron Silver (politician) (born 1943), American former senator in Florida

== See also ==
- Ronnie Silver (born 1951), American stock car racer and crew chief
- Ron Silverman, American actor, film and television producer
