= Trevor Sutherland (cricketer) =

New Zealand cricketer (born 1954)

Personal information
- Full name: Trevor Donald Sutherland
- Born: 4 July 1954 (age 72); Dunedin, Otago, New Zealand
- Batting: Right-handed
- Bowling: Right-arm medium-fast

Domestic team information
- Years: Team
- 1976/77–1981/82: Central Otago
- 1979/80: Otago
- Source: CricInfo, 25 May 2016

Trevor Donald Sutherland (born 4 July 1954) is a New Zealand former cricketer. He played five first-class matches for Otago during the 1979–80 season.

Sutherland was burn at Dunedin in 1954. He played age-group cricket for Otago in 1976–77 and made his Hawke Cup debut for Central Otago during the same season, playing for the side regularly in the competition during the late 1970s and early 1980s.

A batsman who played for the Dunston Club and was described as "full of promise", all five of Sutherland's first-class matches came during the 1979–80 season. He made his debut against Auckland at the end of December 1979 but did not bat during the match. He went on to play in four of the province's five remaining matches in the Shell Trophy during the season, scoring a total of 68 runs in his eight innings. His highest score of 28 not out was made against Central Districts in his second match.
