= Rhiane Smith =

New Zealand cricketer (born 1974)

Personal information
- Full name: Rhiane Andrew Smith
- Born: 17 May 1974 (age 52); Owaka, Otago, New Zealand
- Batting: Right-handed
- Bowling: Right-arm medium

Domestic team information
- Years: Team
- 1992/93–1995/96: Otago
- 1996/97: Central Otago
- Source: CricInfo, 24 May 2016

Rhiane Andrew Smith (born 17 May 1974) is a New Zealand former cricketer. He played six first-class and 11 List A matches for Otago between the 1992–93 and 1995–66 seasons.

Smith was born at Owaka in Otago in 1974 and educated at Otago Boys' High School in Dunedin. He played age-group and Second XI cricket for Otago before making his senior debut for the side in a January 1993 List A match against Auckland.

Later in the 1992–93 season, Smith played for the national under-19 side against the touring Australian under-19 side. The following season he made his first-class debut for Otago before touring Pakistan with the New Zealand under-19 team in January and February 1994. Primarily a bowler, he took a total of eight first-class and 10 List A wickets in a senior career which spanned four seasons.

In 1996–97 Smith played for Central Otago in the Hawke Cup. He has since worked as a centenary sales representative. He has coached the Otago Country cricket team and played club cricket in Clutha.
