= Simon Hinton =

New Zealand cricketer (born 1968)

Personal information
- Full name: Simon David Hinton
- Born: 21 March 1968 (age 58); Clyde, New Zealand
- Batting: Right-handed
- Bowling: Right-arm medium

Domestic team information
- Years: Team
- 1994/95–1996/97: Central Otago
- 1994/95: Otago
- Source: ESPNcricinfo, 14 May 2016

Simon David Hinton (born 21 March 1968) is a New Zealand former cricketer. He played one first-class match for Otago during the 1994–95 season.

Hinton was born at Clyde in Central Otago in 1968. He played for Central Otago in the Hawke Cup between 1994–95 and 1996–97. His only first-class match was a March 1995 fixture against Auckland at Carisbrook. Primarily a bowler, Hinton took two wickets in the match. He played for Otago's Second XI in both 1994–95 and 1996–97.
