= Harold Cameron =

New Zealand cricketer (1912–2000)

Personal information
- Full name: Harold Raines Cameron
- Born: 10 October 1912; Dunedin, Otago, New Zealand
- Died: 8 October 2000 (aged 87); Auckland, New Zealand
- Relatives: Donald Cameron (brother)

Domestic team information
- Years: Team
- 1939/40: Otago
- Only FC: 9 February 1940 Otago v Wellington
- Source: CricketArchive, 27 February 2024

Harold Raines Cameron (10 October 1912 – 8 October 2000) was a New Zealand cricketer. He was a right-handed batsman who played for Otago.

Cameron was born at Dunedin in 1912, the younger brother of Donald Cameron who also played for Otago. He was educated at Otago Boys' High School and worked as a sales manager.

Cameron made a single first-class appearance for the Otago during the 1939–40 season in a Plunket Shield match against Wellington. From the upper-middle order, he scored 26 runs in the first innings in which he batted, and 18 runs in the second. He had first played representative cricket for the team in the 1935–36 season match against Southland, and played a total of five times for Otago, including three times against Southland and in a match in March 1939 against a touring English team. He later became an Otago selector.

Cameron died in 2000 at Auckland. He was 87. An obituary was published in the New Zealand Cricket Almanack the following year.
