= Raymond Procter =

New Zealand cricketer (1938–2024)

Personal information
- Full name: Raymond Albert Procter
- Born: 9 March 1938; Dunedin, New Zealand
- Died: 8 March 2024 (aged 85); Cambridge, New Zealand
- Batting: Left-handed
- Role: Batsman

Domestic team information
- Years: Team
- 1960/61: Otago
- 1967/68: Waikato
- Source: ESPNcricinfo, 21 May 2016

Raymond Albert Procter (9 March 1938 – 8 March 2024) was a New Zealand cricketer. He played six first-class matches for Otago during the 1960–61 season.

Procter was born at Dunedin in 1938 and educated at King's High School in the city. He played cricket for Central Otago from the 1956–57 season, and played for Otago age-group sides and for Otago sides against Southland during the late 1950s. He made his first-class debut for the provincial side in December 1960 and played in all five of Otago's Plunket Shield matches during the season as well as against the touring English team.

During the following season, Procter played for a University of Auckland side and throughout the late 1960s made appearances for Waikato, including in the Hawke Cup during the 1967–68 season. In his six first-class matches he scored a total of 79 runs, with a highest score of 15 made against Wellington during his final representative match.
