= Robert Maxwell (cricketer) =

New Zealand cricketer (1945–2024)

Bob Maxwell
Personal information
- Full name: Robert James Maxwell
- Born: 10 February 1945; Gore, Southland, New Zealand
- Died: 14 October 2024 (aged 79); Christchurch, Canterbury, New Zealand
- Batting: Right-handed
- Bowling: Right-arm off break

Domestic team information
- Years: Team
- 1970/71: Otago
- 1971/72–1975/76: Central Otago
- Source: ESPNcricinfo, 16 May 2016

Robert James Maxwell (10 February 1945 – 14 October 2024) was a New Zealand cricketer. He played one List A match for Otago during the 1970–71 season.

Maxwell was born at Gore in the Southland Region in 1945. He was educated at Bayfield High School in Dunedin and was first selected to play cricket for the provincial under-20 side during the 1963–64 season. He played some matches for Southland during 1965–66 and made his senior provincial debut for Otago in a List A match against the touring England side at Carisbrook in February 1971. Opening the batting, he scored only two runs.

Maxwell went on to play Hawke Cup and Waitaki-Tekau Trophy cricket for Central Otago between the 1971–72 and 1975–76 seasons.
