= Robert Rutherford (cricketer) =

New Zealand cricketer (1886–1960)

Personal information
- Full name: Robert Malcom Rutherford
- Born: 4 October 1886; Dunedin, Otago, New Zealand
- Died: 17 August 1960 (aged 73); Dunedin, Otago, New Zealand
- Source: CricInfo, 22 May 2016

Robert Malcolm Rutherford (4 October 1886 – 17 August 1960) was a New Zealand lawyer and sportsman. He played nine first-class cricket matches for Otago between the 1908–09 and 1913–14 seasons and captained the Otago field hockey team.

Rutherford was born at Dunedin in 1886. He studied law at the University of Otago in the city and played both cricket and hockey for the university club. Described as a "well-known" cricketer, he made his senior representative debut for the representative cricket team in a December 1908 Plunket Shield match against Auckland, making scores of 11 and 14 and taking one wicket in the match. He played twice more in top-class matches for the side during the season before making three appearances in 1909–10. His final three first-class matches came between the 1910–11 season and 1913–14. In total Rutherford scored 251 first-class runs and took 10 wickets for Otago.

He was a member of the Otago Hockey Association committee and played regularly for the province's representative side. Described as a "brilliant forward", he captained the provincial side against Southland during the 1911 season.

Rutherford qualified as a solicitor and left Dunedin in 1912 to work as the managing clerk for ER Bowler at Gore in Southland in 1912. He was admitted to the bar later in the year. By 1921 he was working at Milton to the south of Dunedin. He died at Dunedin in 1960 at the age of 73.
