= Simon Richards =

New Zealand cricketer (born 1964)

Personal information
- Full name: Simon John Richards
- Born: 28 January 1964 (age 62); Dunedin, Otago, New Zealand
- Batting: Right-handed

Domestic team information
- Years: Team
- 1983/84–1984/85: Otago
- Source: CricInfo, 22 May 2016

Simon John Richards (born 28 January 1964) is a New Zealand former cricketer. He played five first-class and five List A matches for Otago during the 1983–84 and 1984–85 seasons.

Richards was born at Dunedin in 1964. A right-handed batsman, he played age-group cricket for Otago from the 1981–82 season, also appearing for the New Zealand under-19 side during the season. He made his senior representative debut for the province in a December 1983 List A match against Central Districts, scoring four runs during the match. He made his first-class debut the following day, also against Central Districts, before playing against the touring England Test side the following month and against Northern Districts towards the end of the season.

All five of Richards' List A matches were played during the 1983–84 season, and the following season he played only two more first-class matches for Otago. He scored a total of 88 first-class and 77 List A runs, with a highest List A score of 61 coming against Wellington. This was his only senior representative half-century.
