= Leonard Casey =

New Zealand cricketer

Personal information
- Full name: Leonard Francis Casey
- Born: 7 May 1888; Dunedin, New Zealand
- Died: 8 October 1964 (aged 76); Christchurch, New Zealand
- Batting: Right-handed
- Bowling: Right-arm fast-medium
- Role: Bowler

Domestic team information
- Years: Team
- 1920/21–1922/23: Otago

Career statistics
Competition	First-class
Matches	6
Runs scored	91
Batting average	10.11
100s/50s	0/0
Top score	25*
Balls bowled	916
Wickets	16
Bowling average	28.12
5 wickets in innings	0
10 wickets in match	0
Best bowling	4/51
Catches/stumpings	6/–
- Source: CricInfo, 27 February 2024

Leonard Francis Casey (7 May 1888 – 8 October 1964) was a New Zealand cricketer who played six matches of first-class cricket for Otago between the 1920–21 and 1922–23 seasons.

Casey was born at Dunedin in 1888. A right-arm fast-medium bowler, his best first-class figures were 4 for 51 against Auckland in the Plunket Shield in 1921–22.

Casey worked for 41 years for the New Zealand Government Life Insurance Department. He managed the department's branches in Greymouth and Hamilton before being appointed to manage the Christchurch branch in 1941. He retired in 1947. He died at home in Riccarton, Christchurch, in 1964. He and his wife had three children.
