= Stuart Duncan (cricketer) =

New Zealand cricketer

Personal information
- Full name: Stuart Ferguslie Duncan
- Born: 15 July 1906; Dunedin, New Zealand
- Died: 2 July 1971 (aged 64); Dunedin, New Zealand
- Batting: Right-handed

Domestic team information
- Years: Team
- 1925/26–1940/41: Otago
- Source: ESPNcricinfo, 8 May 2016

Stuart Ferguslie Duncan (15 July 1906 – 2 July 1971) was a New Zealand sportsman. He played association football for the New Zealand national football team. He also played in five first-class cricket matches for Otago between 1925 and 1941.

Duncan was born at Dunedin in 1906. He was educated at Otago Boys' High School and played association football for Otago and for the New Zealand national football team. He worked as a manager and was a cricket selector for Otago. He died in 1971 at Dunedin; an obituary was published in the New Zealand Cricket Almanack the same year.
