= Kevin Briggs (cricketer) =

New Zealand cricketer

Personal information
- Full name: Kevin David Briggs
- Born: 27 January 1939; Dunedin, New Zealand
- Died: 9 April 2004 (aged 65); Hororata, Canterbury Region, New Zealand
- Batting: Right-handed

Domestic team information
- Years: Team
- 1959/60: Otago
- Source: ESPNcricinfo, 6 May 2016

Kevin David Briggs (27 January 1939 – 9 April 2004) was a New Zealand cricketer. He played in two first-class matches for Otago during the 1959–60 season.

Briggs was born at Dunedin in 1939. After playing age group cricket for Otago from 1956, he made his first-class debut for the representative side in the Christmas Day Plunket Shield fixture against Canterbury at Lancaster Park in Christchurch. After making a duck in his first innings and scoring five runs in his second, he was retained in the side for the next match against Wellington. He again made a duck and then nine runs and was not picked for any of Otago's other matches during the season.

Professionally Briggs was the secretary and manager of a golf club. He died at Hororata in the Canterbury Region in 2004 aged 65. An obituary was published in that year's New Zealand Cricket Almanack.
