= Reginald Cherry =

New Zealand cricketer

Personal information
- Full name: Reginald William Henry Cherry
- Born: 3 October 1901; Lambeth, London, England
- Died: 22 December 1938 (aged 37); Dunedin, New Zealand
- Batting: Right-handed

Domestic team information
- Years: Team
- 1919/20–1931/32: Otago

Career statistics
Competition	First-class
Matches	23
Runs scored	792
Batting average	19.80
100s/50s	1/2
Top score	123*
Catches/stumpings	3/–
- Source: ESPNcricinfo, 8 August 2023

Reginald William Henry Cherry (3 October 1901 – 22 December 1938) was a New Zealand cricketer. He played 23 first-class matches for Otago between 1919 and 1932.

Born in England, Cherry came to New Zealand with his family in 1914 and was educated at Dunedin Technical College. He worked as a commercial traveller for the New Zealand company Sargood Son and Ewen. He died when he developed complications after a minor operation, just a few days after top-scoring for his club in a senior cricket match in Dunedin. He left a widow but no children.

Cherry played cricket as a batsman. His highest score in first-class cricket was his only century, 123 not out against Canterbury in December 1925.
