= Thomas MacFarlane =

New Zealand cricketer

Personal information
- Full name: Thomas MacFarlane

Domestic team information
- Years: Team
- 1870/71–1873/74: Otago
- Source: CricketArchive, 15 May 2016

Thomas MacFarlane was a New Zealand cricketer. He played four first-class matches for Otago, two in each of the 1870–71 and 1873–74 seasons.

In his four first-class matches MacFarlane scored a total of 58 runs and took two wickets. He went on to play in a team of 22 for Otago against the touring Australians in January 1878.
