= Hugh Duncan =

New Zealand cricketer

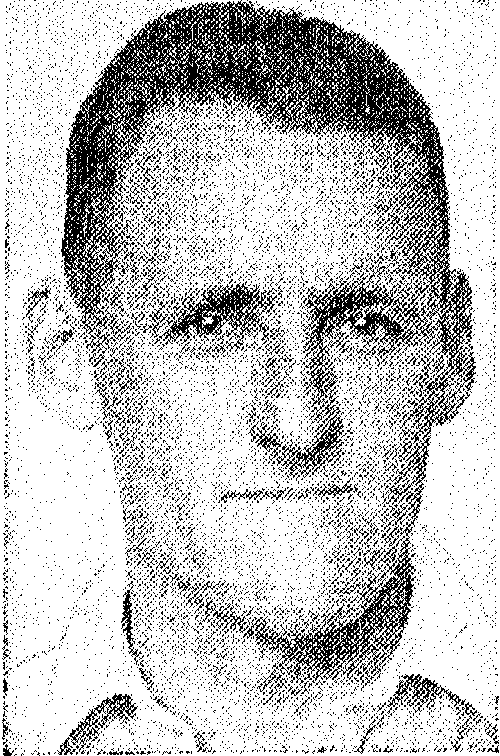
- Duncan pictured in 1944

Personal information
- Born: 26 August 1898; Auckland, New Zealand
- Died: 31 August 1964 (aged 66); Blenheim, New Zealand
- Batting: Right-handed

Domestic team information
- Years: Team
- 1921/22–1924/25: Otago

Career statistics
Competition	First-class
Matches	9
Runs scored	247
Batting average	15.43
100s/50s	0/1
Top score	67
Catches/stumpings	5/–
- Source: Cricinfo, 28 October 2018

Hugh Duncan (26 August 1898 – 31 August 1964) was a New Zealand cricketer. He played nine first-class matches for Otago between 1921 and 1925.

A right-handed batsman who sometimes opened the innings, Duncan's highest score was 67 against Canterbury in 1922–23. He was a member of Otago's first Plunket Shield-winning team in 1924–25.

After Duncan's first-class career finished, he returned to his home town of Auckland, where he captained the Parnell club to the premiership several times. He served for some years as selector for the Auckland cricket team and chairman of the Auckland Cricket Association. In 1946 he moved to Wellington, where he was sole selector from 1946 to 1949, and served as president of the Wellington Cricket Association.

Duncan was managing director of the Mercantile and General Insurance Company in Wellington, a member of the Earthquake and War Damage Commission from 1950 to 1962, and a member of the Workers' Compensation Board from 1951 to 1962. His wife Mina died in 1960. He retired in 1962 and moved to Blenheim, where he died in August 1964.
