= George Reardon (cricketer) =

New Zealand cricketer

Personal information
- Born: 24 May 1880; Melbourne, Victoria, Australia
- Died: 11 June 1932 (aged 52); Melbourne, Victoria, Australia

Domestic team information
- Years: Team
- 1903/04: Otago
- Source: ESPNcricinfo, 22 May 2016

George Reardon (24 May 1880 – 11 June 1932) was an Australian cricketer. He played one first-class match in new Zealand for Otago during the 1903–04 season.

Reardon was born at Melbourne in 1880. A club cricket for Dunedin Cricket Club, where he was considered "a good all-round man", Reardon only made a single appearance in first-class cricket, recording a pair and bowling five wicketless overs for Otago against Canterbury at Christchurch in December 1903. He "bowled well" for the provincial team in a match without first-class status against Southland during the same season, and had been elected as deputy-captain of Dunedin CC for the 1903–04 season.

Reardon died at Melbourne in 1932. He was aged 52.
