= Arthur Symonds (cricketer) =

New Zealand cricketer (1890–1946)

Personal information
- Full name: Arthur Edmund Symonds
- Born: 8 May 1890; Dunedin, Otago, New Zealand
- Died: 20 April 1946 (aged 55); Lower Hutt, Wellington, New Zealand
- Role: Wicket-keeper

Domestic team information
- Years: Team
- 1926/27: Otago
- Source: ESPNcricinfo, 25 May 2016

Arthur Edmund Symonds (8 May 1890 – 20 April 1946) was a New Zealand sportsman. He played one first-class match for Otago during the 1926–27 season.

Born at Dunedin in 1890, Symonds worked for railway companies. He played rugby union for the Zingari-Richmond club in Dunedin and represented the Otago Rugby Football Union in seven matches between 1911 and 1912. He was described after his death as having "played a good, honest game of football" and in 1930 he was considered to have been one of the club's most prominent players. He was later one of its vice-presidents.

Symonds played club cricket for Dunedin Cricket Club and represented the provincial side in a 1924 fixture against Southland. He scored 43 and 17 and was reported as having "played well", although "he had more than his share of luck".

He played his only first-class match for Otago in February 1927. In the match, which was against Canterbury cricket team at Carisbrook in Dunedin, he kept-wicket, replacing Laurie Green who had broken a rib in the previous match against Auckland. Symonds took one catch and scored five runs, although his wicket-keeping was poor and his performance behind the stumps described as "not too good" as he conceded too many byes. He missed a "good stumping chance", although his keeping improved during the match. He did not play for the representative side again.

Symonds died at Lower Hutt in 1946. He was aged 55.
