= John Jolly (cricketer) =

New Zealand cricketer

Personal information
- Full name: John Logan Jolly
- Born: 27 July 1912; Cromwell, Central Otago, New Zealand
- Died: 9 July 1995 (aged 82); Sydney, New South Wales, Australia
- Batting: Left-handed
- Bowling: Right-arm medium

Domestic team information
- Years: Team
- 1933/34: Otago
- Source: ESPNcricinfo, 15 May 2016

John Logan Jolly (27 July 1912 – 9 July 1995) was a New Zealand sportsman who played representative rugby union and cricket for Otago.

Jolly was born at Cromwell in Central Otago in 1912 and was educated at Otago Boys' High School in Dunedin. He worked as a mining engineer.

He played provincial rugby for the Otago Rugby Football Union and appeared in one first-class cricket match for the Otago cricket team during the 1933–34 season. Opening the bowling against Auckland at Eden Park, he failed to take a wicket and scored 12 runs in the match.

Jolly died at Sydney in Australia in 1995 aged 82. An obituary was published in the 2003 edition of the New Zealand Cricket Alamnack.
