= Leonard Monk =

New Zealand cricketer

Personal information
- Full name: Leonard Stanley Monk
- Born: 14 November 1873; Dunedin, Otago, New Zealand
- Died: 21 July 1948 (aged 74); Edgecliff, Sydney, Australia
- Source: ESPNcricinfo, 17 May 2016

Leonard Stanley Monk (14 November 1873 – 21 July 1948) was a New Zealand cricketer. He played one first-class match for Otago during 1901–02 season.

Born at Dunedin in 1873, Monk was a fast bowler of considerable pace. After one first-class match in December 1901 in which he secured four wickets cheaply, and Otago won, he left Dunedin to tour with the Hawtrey Comedy Company, which also fielded a cricket team on its tours. He remained in the theatre as an actor and manager, touring in Australia and New Zealand. He represented the Shakespearean actor Allan Wilkie in the 1920s.

Monk served with the Australian forces in World War One. He married Elsie Stephanie Austin in July 1934 and died at Edgecliff in Sydney in 1948 at the age of 74.
