= Walter Strang =

New Zealand cricketer and businessman

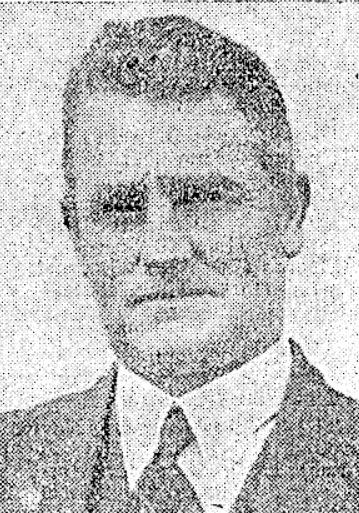
- Strang in 1932

Personal information
- Full name: Walter Wilson Strang
- Born: 15 April 1888; Wellington, New Zealand
- Died: 28 February 1944 (aged 55); St Clair, Dunedin, New Zealand
- Batting: Right-handed

Domestic team information
- Years: Team
- 1929/30: Otago
- Source: CricInfo, 25 May 2016

Walter Wilson Strang (15 April 1888 – 28 February 1944) was a New Zealand cricketer and businessman. He played one first-class match for Otago in 1929–30, when he captained the team in the final match of that season's Plunket Shield.

== Life and career ==
Strang's father, Captain Robert Strang, was a ship's captain from Scotland who moved to New Zealand in the 1880s and held senior positions with the Union Steam Ship Company of New Zealand. The youngest of five children, Walter Strang was born in Wellington in April 1888, and his mother died a few days later. Walter attended Otago Boys' High School in Dunedin.

Strang was working as an ironmonger in Dunedin when he enlisted in World War I. He served in Europe as a sergeant in the Canterbury Infantry Regiment of the New Zealand Expeditionary Force.

When he returned from the war, Strang married Christina Ness in Dunedin in January 1920. After working for the ironmongers Paterson and Barr for several years, in 1928 he opened his own sporting goods business, Walter Strang, Limited, in Princes Street in central Dunedin.

Strang first played senior cricket in Dunedin in the 1907–08 season for the Albion club, and retired 25 years later during the 1932–33 season after 12 seasons with the Dunedin club. During the late 1920s his batting form brought him close to selection for the Otago team several times. For Otago's final match in the Plunket Shield in the 1929–30 season, many senior players were unavailable for the trip to Christchurch, including Arthur Alloo, who had captained the team in previous matches. Strang, aged 41, who was selected to captain the team, was one of four Otago players who made their first-class debuts; for three of them, including Strang, it was their only first-class match. Strang opened the batting, scoring 32 in the first innings, Otago's highest score in the match, and 5 in the second. Canterbury won by an innings on the second day of the four-day match.

Strang served as an officer in the National Military Reserve during World War II. He died at his home in the Dunedin suburb of St Clair in February 1944, aged 55.
