= Thomas Sonntag =

New Zealand cricketer

Personal information
- Full name: Thomas Ryan Sonntag
- Born: 28 August 1858; Eumemmerring, Colony of Victoria
- Died: 9 October 1938 (aged 80); Dunedin, Otago, New Zealand

Domestic team information
- Years: Team
- 1883/84: Otago
- Source: CricInfo, 24 May 2016

Thomas Ryan Sonntag (28 August 1858 – 9 October 1938) was an Australian-born sportsman. He played rugby union and first-class cricket in New Zealand for Otago and competed at highland games in the province during the 1880s.

Sonntag was born at Eumemmerring in what was then the Colony of Victoria in Australia in 1858 and came to New Zealand as a child. He attended school in the Kaikorai area of Dunedin in Otago and later worked in plant nurseries.

A rugby union forward, Sonntag was considered "well-known" throughout New Zealand. He played club rugby in Dunedin for the Zingari, Kaikorai and Dunedin teams and played representative matches for the Otago Rugby Football Union. In 1888 he played for both Otago and a representative South Island team against the touring English team led by AE Stoddart―the first major tour of New Zealand by a European team.

As well as rugby, Sonntag played cricket in the Otago representative side. His only first-class match was against a touring Tasmanian side in February 1884. He scored two runs in the only innings in which he batted. He also competed in the highland games held in Dunedin, winning trophies as a wrestler.

Sonntag died at Dunedin in Otago in 1938 at the age of 80.
