= Walter Pearless =

Australian-born New Zealand cricketer

Personal information
- Full name: Walter Hugh Pearless
- Born: 28 March 1879; Gippsland, Victoria, Australia
- Died: 29 December 1940 (aged 61); Richmond, Nelson, New Zealand

Domestic team information
- Years: Team
- 1895/96–1902/03: Nelson
- 1904/05: Nelson
- FC debut: 29 December 1904 Otago v Wellington
- Last FC: 31 December 1904 Otago v Canterbury

Career statistics
Competition	First-class
Matches	2
Runs scored	29
Batting average	14.50
100s/50s	0/0
Top score	17
Catches/stumpings	1/–
- Source: CricInfo, 10 May 2024

Walter Hugh Pearless (28 March 1879 – 29 December 1940) was an Australian-born doctor and cricketer who played first-class cricket for Otago during the 1904–05 season.

Pearless was born at Gippsland in Victoria in 1879 but educated at Nelson College in Nelson, New Zealand. He played club cricket for Nelson College before moving to play for Wakefeld Cricket Club, a club that he remained involved with throughout much of his life. He played matches for the Nelson cricket team, including against a touring English team led by Lord Hawke in 1902–03, and later in his life acted as a selector for the Nelson Hawke Cup team.

After leaving school, Pearless, whose father was a doctor, studied medicine at the University of Otago in Dunedin. Whilst in Dunedin he played cricket for the Carisbrook club and during the 1904–05 season played in two representative matches for Otago.

Described as a "patient and consistent cricketer", he made his debut for the team against Wellington in late December 1904, scoring 17 runs in his only innings of an innings victory, impressing with his "sound defence", although the cricket correspondent of the Otago Witness felt that he was unlucky to have batted at a time when Wellington's fielding was impressive, his "powerful hitting" failing to beat the fielders.

The match finished at 11:30 on 31 December and Pearless played his second, and final, first-class match later on the same day. The match, against Canterbury started at 2 pm on the same day, Pearless scoring eight runs in his first innings and four not out in his second, batting last in Otago's order during his final innings.

Pearless practiced as a doctor throughout the rest of his life, much of it in the Motueka area. He was involved with Motueka Cricket Club until his death at Richmond in 1940 at the age of 61.
