= William Wyinks =

New Zealand cricketer

Personal information
- Born: 11 September 1854; Elgin, Elginshire, Scotland
- Died: 14 September 1921 (aged 67); Wellington, New Zealand

Domestic team information
- Years: Team
- 1882/83–1885/86: Otago
- Source: CricInfo, 29 May 2016

William Wyinks (11 September 1854 – 14 September 1921) was a Scottish-born sportsman and civil servant in New Zealand. He played two first-class cricket matches for Otago and represented the province in rugby union.

== Life and career ==
Wyinks was born at Elgin in Scotland in 1854 and emigrated to New Zealand as a young man, settling at Dunedin in Otago. He joined the Land Transfer Department in 1878 and worked there for 43 years until his death, when he was Registrar General of Lands and Wellington District Land Registrar.

Wyinks was a well-known sportsman in his youth, playing rugby for the Union club in Dunedin and for Otago, and cricket for Carisbrook Cricket Club in Dunedin and for Otago. He also umpired a first-class match in Dunedin in 1884. In later life he played golf and fished.

Wyinks died in Wellington in September 1921 at the age of 67, leaving a widow, four daughters and a son.
