= Alexander Dawes =

New Zealand cricketer

Personal information
- Born: 20 November 1859; Inverness, Scotland
- Died: 24 February 1939 (aged 79); Dunedin, New Zealand

Domestic team information
- Years: Team
- 1884/85–1894/95: Otago
- Source: ESPNcricinfo, 8 May 2016

Alexander Dawes (20 November 1859 – 24 February 1939) was a New Zealand cricketer. He played two first-class matches for Otago, one in each of the 1884–85 and 1894–95 seasons.

Dawes was born at Inverness in Scotland in 1859. Professionally he worked as a coach builder. He first played for an Otago team in January 1881, playing in a team of 22 against the touring Australians at the Caledonian Ground in Dunedin. He made his provincial first-class debut four seasons later, playing against Canterbury at Lancaster Park in December 1884. He played in other matches against Southland in 1894 and 1896 and made his other first-class appearance for the team against a Fiji team in February 1895.

Dawes died at Dunedin in 1939. He was aged 79.
