= Lewis Hollands =

New Zealand cricketer (born 1940)

Personal information
- Full name: Lewis Douglas Hollands
- Born: 25 October 1940 (age 86); Gore, New Zealand
- Batting: Right-handed
- Role: Batsman

Domestic team information
- Years: Team
- 1969/70–1971/72: Otago

Career statistics
Competition	First-class
Matches	6
Runs scored	191
Batting average	27.28
100s/50s	0/1
Top score	66*
Catches/stumpings	2/–
- Source: ESPNcricinfo, 3 July 2022

Lewis Douglas Hollands (born 25 October 1940) is a New Zealand former cricketer. He played six first-class matches for Otago between 1969 and 1972.

== Sporting career ==
Born in Gore, Southland, Hollands was a right-handed batsman. His highest first-class score was 66 not out against Northern Districts in January 1970, when he and Jack Alabaster put on an unbroken partnership of 118 for the eighth wicket.

Hollands represented Southland in four sports: cricket, rugby, tennis and badminton. He played Hawke Cup cricket for Southland between 1965 and 1974.
