= Nathan Morland =

New Zealand cricketer (born 1976)

Personal information
- Full name: Nathan Douglas Morland
- Born: 20 December 1976 (age 49); Dunedin, Otago, New Zealand
- Batting: Right-handed
- Bowling: Right-arm off break
- Role: Bowler

Domestic team information
- Years: Team
- 1996/97–2003/04: Otago
- 1999/00: Dunedin Metropolitan
- 2006/07: Southland
- Source: ESPNcricinfo, 18 May 2016

Nathan Douglas Morland (born 20 December 1976) is a New Zealand former cricketer. He played 34 first-class and 38 List A matches, mainly for Otago, between the 1996–1997 and 2003–2004 seasons.

Morland was born at Dunedin in 1976 and educated at Otago Boys' High School in the city. He played age-group cricket for Otago from the 1994–1995 season and was part of the New Zealand Cricket Academy developmental squad, going on to play for the national under-19 team, touring both Australia and England with the side.

Morland made his senior representative debut for Otago in December 1996, playing in a List A match against Auckland at Eden Park, before making his first-class debut later in the same season. In total he played 33 first-class and 33 List A matches for Otago, with his other top-level matches coming for the New Zealand Academy side and for the Southern Conference. Primarily an off break bowler, he took 50 first-class and 31 List A wickets. He scored a single half-century, making 56 runs against Wellington in a December 2003 Plunket Shield match. This was his last season as a contracted player with Otago. He went on to play Hawke Cup cricket for Southland and to work as a teacher.
