= Adam Glen =

New Zealand cricketer (1853–1937)

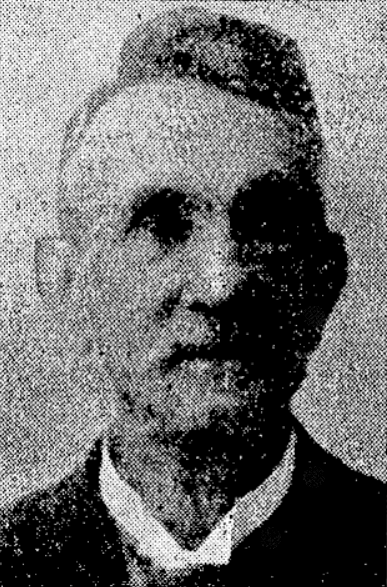

Personal information
- Born: 1 March 1853; Dunedin, New Zealand
- Died: 3 July 1937 (aged 84); Auckland, New Zealand
- Bowling: Right-arm medium
- Role: Bowler

Domestic team information
- Years: Team
- 1872/73–1886/87: Otago

Career statistics
Competition	First-class
Matches	6
Runs scored	29
Batting average	3.22
100s/50s	0/0
Top score	13
Balls bowled	655
Wickets	13
Bowling average	20.53
5 wickets in innings	0
10 wickets in match	0
Best bowling	4/55
Catches/stumpings	6/0
- Source: ESPNcricinfo, 14 July 2020

Adam Glen (1 March 1853 – 3 July 1937) was a New Zealand cricketer. He played six first-class matches for Otago between 1873 and 1887.

== Cricket career ==
A right-arm medium-pace bowler who could bowl accurately for long periods, Glen was often able to extract unexpected bounce from the pitch. He achieved some impressive figures for Dunedin Cricket Club (such as 8 for 26, 6 for 9 and 9 for 18) and once took 101 wickets in a season at an average of 4.22. He was not as spectacularly successful at first-class level, but in his first match for Otago, who were weakened by the unavailability of several leading players, he was the team's best bowler against Canterbury, taking 4 for 55 in an innings defeat in February 1873. He was also effective against the touring Australians in 1877–78, taking 3 for 16 from 19.3 four-ball overs.

He later took up umpiring. His first first-class match as an umpire was the Otago–Canterbury match of February 1887 in Christchurch. The Otago player Charlie Frith failed to turn up on the first day, when Glen umpired; when Frith again failed to appear on the second day, Glen was prevailed upon by the Otago team to play – so Glen's debut as an umpire also became his last match as a player. He umpired 10 first-class matches between 1887 and 1898.

== Personal life ==
Glen married Frances Bellamy in Dunedin in March 1879. They moved in 1906 from Dunedin to Otautau, in Southland, where Glen worked in his son's softgoods business. They returned to Dunedin a few years later, where Glen worked among the composing staff at the Evening Star for 21 years until his retirement in 1934.

They moved to Hāwera in 1935, and Glen died in Auckland in July 1937. His wife and a son and daughter survived him.
