= Scott McHardy =

New Zealand cricketer (born 1970)

David McHardy
Personal information
- Full name: David Scott McHardy
- Born: 21 November 1970 (age 55); Blenheim, Marlborough, New Zealand
- Batting: Right-handed
- Bowling: Right-arm legbreak

Domestic team information
- Years: Team
- 1991/92–1992/93: Otago
- 1993/94–1997/98: Wellington
- Source: ESPNcricinfo, 15 May 2016

David Scott McHardy (born 21 November 1970) is a New Zealand former cricketer. He played first-class and List A matches for Otago and Wellington between the 1991–92 and 1997–98 seasons.

Scott McHardy was born at Blenheim in Marlborough in 1970. He played age-group cricket for Otago under-20s in the 1990–91 season before making his senior representative debut for the team the following season, playing in a February 1992 Plunket Shield match against Wellington at Carisbrook. He recorded a duck in his first innings but was retained in the team for the remainder of Otago's Shield campaign.

After playing in nine first-class and six List A matches for Otago the following season, McHardy joined Wellington ahead of the 1993–94 season. Over the course of the following four seasons he played another nine first-class and 13 List A matches for the team. In his final season with the team he also played in a Hawke Cup match for Wellington City.

Once retiring, McHardy has played over-50s cricket for Wellington and for the New Zealand national team.
