= Arthur Galland =

New Zealand cricketer

Personal information
- Born: 20 May 1891; Dunedin, New Zealand
- Died: 26 August 1975 (aged 84); Dunedin, New Zealand
- Batting: Right-handed
- Role: All-rounder, wicket-keeper

Domestic team information
- Years: Team
- 1914/15–1930/31: Otago

Career statistics
Competition	First-class
Matches	45
Runs scored	1681
Batting average	21.83
100s/50s	1/7
Top score	115
Balls bowled	920
Wickets	15
Bowling average	28.66
5 wickets in innings	0
10 wickets in match	0
Best bowling	4/54
Catches/stumpings	48/9
- Source: ESPNcricinfo, 7 May 2021

Arthur Galland (20 May 1891 – 26 August 1975) was a New Zealand cricketer. He played 45 first-class matches for Otago between 1914 and 1931.

Galland was born at Dunedin in 1891 and worked as a plumber. A batsman, wicket-keeper and bowler, he was seldom out of the Otago team between his debut in December 1914 and the match against Auckland in January 1931, when he broke a rib. His highest score in first-class cricket came when he top-scored in both innings with 44 and 115 (his only century) against Auckland in January 1926.

Galland was twelfth man for New Zealand in the match at Wellington against the touring Marylebone Cricket Club in 1922–23, but he never played in the eleven for the national team. After his death in 1975 an obituary was published in the New Zealand Cricket Almanack.
