= Stephen Mather (cricketer) =

New Zealand cricketer (born 1973)

Personal information
- Full name: Stephen Robert Mather
- Born: 13 August 1973 (age 53); Napier, Hawke's Bay, New Zealand
- Batting: Right-handed
- Bowling: Right-arm medium

Domestic team information
- Years: Team
- 1993/94–1997/98: Wellington
- 1998/99–1999/00: Otago
- 2000/01: Wellington
- Source: ESPNcricinfo, 16 May 2016

Stephen Robert Mather (born 13 August 1973) is a New Zealand former cricketer. He played first-class cricket for Wellington and Otago between the 1993–94 and 2000–01 seasons.

Mather was born at Napier in the Hawke's Bay region in 1973. He played age-group cricket for both Wellington and Auckland and played under-19 Test and One Day International matches for the New Zealand team during the 1992–93 season. The following season he made his senior representative debut for Wellington, playing against Central Districts in a Plunket Shield match in December 1993.

In a professional career which lasted until the end of the 2000–01 season, Mather played in 41 first-class and 69 List A matches. He scored 1,606 first-class runs and took 22 wickets. He played in Otago for two seasons at the end of the 1990s.
