= Geoffrey Osborne =

New Zealand cricketer (born 1956)

Geoff Osborne
Personal information
- Full name: Geoffrey Colin Osborne
- Born: 24 February 1956 (age 70); Dunedin, New Zealand
- Batting: Left-handed
- Bowling: Right-arm medium

Domestic team information
- Years: Team
- 1977/78–1981/82: Otago
- 1981/82: Southland
- Source: ESPNcricinfo, 20 May 2016

Geoffrey Colin Osborne (born 24 February 1956) is a New Zealand former cricketer. He played two first-class and nine List matches for Otago between the 1977–78 and 1981–82 seasons.

Geoff Osborne was born at Dunedin in 1956. He played age-group cricket for Otago from the 1975–76 season and made his senior debut for the representative side in November 1977, playing in a List A match against Central Districts. He went on to play the first of his two first=class matches later in the season, playing against the New Zealand under-23 side. Osborne played occasionally for the one-day side of the following three seasons, never making more than three appearances in a season. His final first-class match came against Canterbury in January 1982. He also played two Hawke Cup matches for Southland during the 1981–82 season.

Osborne's daughter Sarah played for Otago women between 2009–10 and 2013–14, making almost 50 appearances for the side. His son Jason has played Hawke Cup cricket for Southland.
