= George Paramor =

New Zealand cricketer

Personal information
- Full name: George Henry Paramor
- Born: 19 June 1846; Margate, Kent, England
- Died: 2 August 1925 (aged 79); Liverpool, New South Wales, Australia
- Role: All-rounder

Domestic team information
- Years: Team
- 1873/74–1880/81: Otago

Career statistics
Competition	First-class
Matches	8
Runs scored	232
Batting average	15.46
100s/50s	0/1
Top score	62
Balls bowled	1,102
Wickets	25
Bowling average	20.84
5 wickets in innings	1
10 wickets in match	0
Best bowling	6/45
Catches/stumpings	6/–
- Source: ESPNcricinfo, 20 May 2016

George Paramor (19 June 1846 – 2 August 1925) was an English cricketer. He moved to New Zealand in 1873 and played eight first-class matches for Otago between 1873 and 1881.

Paramor was employed by the Dunedin Cricket Club as a professional in 1873, supervising the club's ground and practice sessions, and the coaching of younger players. He supplemented his cricket earnings by working in an ironmongery warehouse, whose owner allowed him time off for cricket.

The New Zealand cricket historian Tom Reese wrote of Paramor: "He was a tall upstanding player, whose long reddish beard was usually tucked inside his shirt. He was a popular player indeed." His highest score was 62, out of Otago's first innings total of 148, against Canterbury in 1874–75. It was Otago's highest score to that date. He was known for his fighting qualities, which he showed by effectively combatting an early form of bodyline bowling used by the English bowler Tom Emmett in 1877. His best bowling figures were 6 for 45 against Canterbury in 1878–79.

Paramor moved to New South Wales in 1881, where he worked as an ironmonger's assistant. He lived in Liverpool, south-west of Sydney, where he died in August 1925.
