= Hiram Rhodes =

New Zealand cricketer

Personal information
- Born: 11 December 1850; Lockwood, Huddersfield, Yorkshire, England
- Died: 1 January 1891 (aged 40); Huddersfield, Yorkshire, England

Domestic team information
- Years: Team
- 1872/83–1876/77: Otago
- Source: Cricinfo, 22 May 2016

Hiram Rhodes (11 December 1850 – 1 January 1891) was an English-born cricketer. He played three first-class matches in New Zealand for Otago, one in each of the 1872–73, 1873–74 and 1876–77 seasons.

Rhodes was born at Lockwood in Huddersfield in 1850. He made his representative debut for Otago against Canterbury in February 1873, scoring eight runs in the match which was the only first-class match played in New Zealand during the season. The following season he played against Auckland before returning to play a final match against Canterbury in January 1877. Later during the season he played in a side of 18 for Otago against a touring English side led by John Lillywhite and during the following season played in a side of 22 against the touring Australians. At a time when long stop was an important fielding position, Rhodes was considered perhaps the best long stop in New Zealand in the 1870s.

In New Zealand Rhodes worked as a warehouseman in Dunedin. He later returned to England and died of influenza in Huddersfield in 1891, leaving a widow and two children.
