= Peter Hills =

New Zealand cricketer (born 1958)

Personal information
- Full name: Peter William Hills
- Born: 3 December 1958 (age 67); Ranfurly, Central Otago, New Zealand
- Batting: Right-handed
- Bowling: Left-arm fast-medium
- Role: Bowler

Domestic team information
- Years: Team
- 1976/77–1989/81: Southland
- 1978/79–1989/90: Otago
- Source: ESPNcricinfo, 14 May 2016

Peter William Hills (born 3 December 1958) is a New Zealand former cricketer. He played 34 first-class and 28 List A matches between the 1978–79 and 1989–90 seasons, almost all for Otago.

Hills was born at Ranfurly in Central Otago in 1958 and was educated at Aparima College in Riverton. He played age-group cricket for Otago from the 1975–76 season, for Southland in the Hawke Cup between 1976–77 and 1979–80, and toured Australia with the New Zealand Universities side during 1977–78. He made his senior representative debut for Otago against Canterbury in December 1978, taking eight wickets, including a five-wicket haul in the first innings of the match.

Described variously as an "economical left-arm fast-medium bowler", as a "lively" bowler and as a bowler with "considerable pace", Hills took a total of 58 first-class wickets, with the 5/57 he took on debut remaining his best bowling analysis. He scored 307 runs, with his highest score of 32 coming as part of a partnership of 69 runs made with Vaughn Johnson against Northern Districts, a tenth-wicket record against the side for Otago which stood until the 2014–15 season. In List A matches he took 35 wickets and scored 180 runs.

Hills played club cricket for Green Island Cricket Club in Dunedin. He worked as a company director.
