= Thomas Adams (classicist) =

New Zealand cricketer and academic

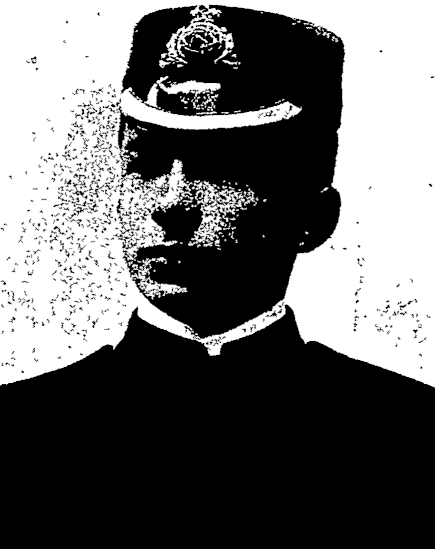
- Adams in 1901

Personal information
- Full name: Thomas Dagger Adams
- Born: 15 January 1884; Dunedin, New Zealand
- Died: 20 November 1953 (aged 69); Dunedin, New Zealand

Domestic team information
- Years: Team
- 1907/08: Otago

Career statistics
Competition	First-class
Matches	3
Runs scored	38
Batting average	6.33
100s/50s	0/0
Top score	18
Catches/stumpings	1/–
- Source: Cricinfo, 28 January 2021

Thomas Dagger Adams (15 January 1884 – 20 November 1953) was a New Zealand academic who was professor of classics at the University of Otago from 1917 to 1948. He played three first-class cricket matches for Otago in 1907/08.

== Early life and family ==
Born in Dunedin in 1884, Adams was the son of William Henry Adams and Eliza Johnston Adams (née Dagger). His father was prominent in the Presbyterian church in Dunedin, serving as a church elder for over 50 years. From 1897 to 1902, Adams was educated at Otago Boys' High School, where he excelled both academically and in sports: he won the junior fives championship; captained the 1st XI cricket team in 1902; and was named dux in 1901. He went on to study at the University of Otago, graduating Master of Arts with first-class honours in 1907.

== First-class cricket ==
Adams played three first-class matches for the Otago cricket team in the 1907/08 season. He scored 38 runs, at an average of 6.33 with a high score of 18, and took one catch in the field. He is known to have played a single other match for the team in 1913/14, a non first-class fixture against Southland.

== Academic career ==
In 1907, Adams was appointed lecturer in Latin at the university, and rose to become professor of classics in 1917. He served in that role for over 30 years, retiring at the end of 1948, when he was conferred with the title of professor emeritus. During his tenure at Otago, he served in various roles, including chair of the professorial board and dean of the arts faculty. Outside of the university, he was prominent in public life in Dunedin, serving as chair of the Knox College council, president of the Shakespeare Club, president of the Otago Institute for the Arts and Sciences, and patron of the Dunedin Repertory Society. He also gave regular readings about a wide range of topics on radio station 4YA between 1937 and 1947.

Adams' time at Otago was interrupted during World War I, when he enlisted voluntarily in the New Zealand Expeditionary Force (NZEF) in early 1917. He was overseas from the end of that year until March 1920. In England, he was appointed an educational instructor under the NZEF education scheme, and was granted the rank of temporary captain. When he was discharged in April 1920, he held the rank of second lieutenant.

When Adams retired from the University of Otago, the university council paid tribute to him, saying:

His natural love of literature and music and his nice discrimination in both have impelled him to give strong support both within and without the University to all movements whose object it was to foster the arts."

== Later life and death ==
On 25 November 1948, Adams married Lucy Sandford Morton, at First Church in Dunedin. Morton was a retired schoolteacher, having been senior assistant at Otago Girls' High School, and also served as president of the University of Otago Court of Convocation, the University of Otago Graduates' Association, and the Otago Girls' High School Old Girls' Association. Adams died in Dunedin on 20 November 1953. His wife, Lucy Adams, died in 1964.
