= Paul Facoory =

New Zealand cricketer (born 1951)

Personal information
- Full name: Paul Richard Facoory
- Born: 3 August 1951 (age 75); Dunedin, Otago, New Zealand
- Batting: Right-handed

Domestic team information
- Years: Team
- 1974/75–1984/85: Otago
- Source: CricInfo, 8 May 2016

Paul Richard Facoory (born 3 August 1951) is a New Zealand former cricketer. He played 28 first-class and eight List A matches for Otago between the 1974–75 and 1984–85 seasons.

Facoory was born at Dunedin in 1951 and educated at King's High School in the city. He worked as a managing director.
