= Matthew Sale =

New Zealand cricketer (born 1975)

Personal information
- Full name: Matthew James Sale
- Born: 2 February 1975 (age 51); Auckland, New Zealand
- Batting: Left-handed
- Role: Wicket-keeper

Domestic team information
- Years: Team
- 1997/98: Otago
- 1998/99: Dunedin Metropolitan
- Source: CricInfo, 23 May 2016

Matthew James Sale (born 2 February 1975) is a New Zealand former cricketer. He played two first-class matches for Otago during the 1997–98 season.

Sale was born at Auckland in 1975. He played in Auckland for Counties during the 1992–93 and 1993–94 seasons before playing age-group and Second XI cricket for Otago teams from the 1994–95 season. A wicket-keeper, he played both of his first-class matches during February 1998, scoring a total of 56 runs and effecting eight dismissals. His highest first-class score of 38 runs came on debut against Central Districts at Carisbrook. He went on to play trial matches for Otago during the following season as well as for Dunedin Metropolitan in the Hawke Cup.
