= Lynn McAlevey =

New Zealand cricketer (born 1953)

Personal information
- Full name: Lynn George McAlevey
- Born: 31 May 1953 (age 73); Dunedin, Otago, New Zealand
- Batting: Right-handed
- Bowling: Slow left-arm orthodox

Domestic team information
- Years: Team
- 1975/76: Otago
- Source: ESPNcricinfo, 15 May 2016

Lynn George McAlevey (born 31 May 1953) is a New Zealand former university lecturer and first-class cricketer. He played two first-class matches for the Otago cricket team during the 1975–76 season.

McAlevey was born at Dunedin in 1953 and educated at King's High School in the city. He played age-group cricket for Otago from the 1971–72 season and played for the University of Otago Cricket Club and the New Zealand Universities side. His two senior representative matches both came in early 1976. In his second match he top-scored in otago's first innings with 48 runs.

McAlevey went on to lecture in finance in the Otago Business School at the University of Otago, joining the school in 1985 and specialising in research into the housing market and house price bubbles. He retired in 2018.
