= Robert Prouting =

New Zealand cricketer (born 1938)

Personal information
- Full name: Robert Henry Prouting
- Born: 2 October 1938 (age 88); Christchurch, Canterbury, New Zealand
- Batting: Right-handed
- Bowling: Right-arm medium
- Role: Bowler

Domestic team information
- Years: Team
- 1965/66: Southland
- 1969/70: Otago
- Source: ESPNcricinfo, 21 May 2016

Robert Henry Prouting (born 2 October 1938) is a New Zealand former cricketer. He played three first-class matches for Otago during the 1969–70 season.

Prouting was born at Christchurch in 1938. He played cricket for Christchurch Boys' High School and for the Canterbury under-20 side as well as appearing for Canterbury representative sides during the late 1950s in matches which do not have first-class status, including taking nine wickets in an innings against North Canterbury in 1958–59. He played club cricket for the Lancaster Park club in Christchurch and spent time playing in both Auckland and Wellington during the early 1960s. During the mid-1960s he played for Southland, including in the Hawke Cup in 1965–66, Otago B sides and for a Combined Services team before making his first-class debut for Otago at Christmas 1969, opening the bowling for the team against Wellington.

In his three first-class matches, all played between Christmas 1969 and mid-January 1970, Prouting took two wickets and scored 13 runs.
