= Scott Waide =

New Zealand cricketer

Personal information
- Full name: Scott James Waide
- Born: 11 July 1977 (age 49); Dunedin, Otago, New Zealand
- Batting: Right-handed
- Bowling: Right-arm off break
- Source: CricInfo, 26 May 2016

Scott James Waide (born 11 July 1977) is a New Zealand former cricketer. He played three first-class matches for Otago during the 2001–02 season.

Waide was born at Dunedin in 1977 and educated at King's High School in the city. He played Second XI cricket for Otago from the 1998–99 season and Hawke Cup cricket for Dunedin Metropolitan in 1998–99 and 1999–00 before making all three of his senior appearances for the provincial side during March 2002.

A right-handed batsman he scored a total of 57 runs in first-class cricket and did not take a wicket with his off break deliveries. Before the season he has been touted, along with Nathan McCullum, as one of Otago's "useful off-spin contenders", but played no more senior cricket following the end of the 2001–02 season.
