= Simon Forde =

New Zealand cricketer (born 1972)

Personal information
- Full name: Simon Francis Forde
- Born: 22 January 1972 (age 54); Tuatapere, Southland, New Zealand
- Batting: Right-handed
- Bowling: Right-arm off-break

Domestic team information
- Years: Team
- 1998/99–2000/01: otago
- 1999/00: Dunedin Metro
- Source: CricInfo, 9 May 2016

Simon Francis Forde (born 22 January 1972) is a New Zealand former cricketer. He played ten first-class and twenty List A matches for Otago between 1998 and 2001.

Forde was born at Tuatapere in Southland in 1972. He worked as a police officer and was awarded a bronze medal for bravery by the Royal Humane Society after attempting to extinguish a fire with two colleagues and searched a burning building for injured survivors. Since retiring from playing cricket he has been a selector for the Otago side.
