= William Carson (cricketer) =

New Zealand cricketer (1866–1955)

Personal information
- Born: 24 September 1866; Dunedin, Otago, New Zealand
- Died: 4 September 1955 (aged 88); Whangārei, Northland, New Zealand

Domestic team information
- Years: Team
- 1884/85–1887/88: Otago
- Source: ESPNcricinfo, 6 May 2016

William Carson (24 September 1866 – 4 September 1955) was a New Zealand cricketer. He played four first-class matches for Otago between the 1884–85 and 1887–88 seasons.

Carson was born at Dunedin in 1866 and educated at Otago Boys' High School. He worked at sea as a marine engineer and was one of the youngest chief engineers to qualify for the Union Steam Ship Company. He was the third engineer on SS Wairarapa when it sunk off of Great Barrier Island in 1894, with the loss of 130 passengers and crew. Carson survived the sinking and at the time of his death was one of the few remaining survivors of the wreck.

Having played club cricket for Grange Cricket Club in Dunedin, Carson made his first-class debut at the age of 18 for Otago in a February 1885 match against Canterbury at Carisbrook. He played once for the side in each of the following three season, always against Canterbury. In 1886–87 he kept wicket for Otago, but generally bowled some overs for the team in each of his other matches. In his final first-class match in January 1888 he took five-wicket hauls in both innings, with 11 wickets in the match. He scored a total of 73 first-class runs and took 15 wickets. Carson had also played rugby union for Alhambra F.C. in Dunedin.

Married and with three children, Carson died in 1955 at Whangārei aged 88. His nephew William Nicol Carson played rugby and cricket for Auckland and New Zealand and his great-nephew John Carson played first-class cricket.
