= Russell Stewart (cricketer) =

New Zealand cricketer (1946–2019)

Personal information
- Full name: Russell Norman Stewart
- Born: 25 January 1946; Dunedin, New Zealand
- Died: 19 December 2019 (aged 73); Dunedin, New Zealand
- Batting: Right-handed
- Bowling: Right-arm leg break
- Role: Batsman

Domestic team information
- Years: Team
- 1973/74–1977/78: Otago
- Source: Cricinfo, 25 May 2016

Russell Norman Stewart (25 January 1946 – 19 December 2019) was a New Zealand cricketer. He played 17 first-class and two List A matches for Otago between the 1973–74 and 1977–78 seasons.

Stewart was born at Dunedin in 1946 and educated at Otago Boys' High School in the city. An opening batsman who was described as "patient" in his approach to batting, he played club cricket for University Cricket Club in Dunedin. He made his age-group debut for Otago in 1964–65 and played for Otago B and Second XI sides before making his senior representative debut for the side in a December 1973 List A match against Canterbury.

After playing in four of Otago's five Plunket Shield matches during the 1973–74 season, Stewart dropped out of the provincial side. He returned to play regularly in both 1976–77 and 1977–78, making the remainder of his first-class appearances during those seasons, including playing in the Otago side against the touring Australians in February 1977. In total he scored 451 first-class runs, including two half-centuries. His highest score of 73 came against Northern Districts on first-class debut in December 1973.

Stewart died on 19 December 2019, at the age of 73.
