= Peter Semple =

New Zealand cricketer

Personal information
- Full name: Peter Charles Semple
- Born: 29 April 1941 (age 85); Dunedin, Otago, New Zealand
- Batting: Right-handed
- Bowling: Right-arm off-break

Domestic team information
- Years: Team
- 1961/62–1971/72: Otago
- Source: CricInfo, 23 May 2016

Peter Charles Semple (born 29 April 1941) is a New Zealand former cricketer. He played 33 first-class and two List A matches for Otago between the 1961–62 and 1971–72 seasons.

Semple was born at Dunedin in 1941 and educated at Otago Boys' High School in the city. He played age-group cricket for Otago from the 1959–60 season before making his senior representative debut against Wellington in a December 1961 Plunket Shield match. After making scores of 11 and 41 in his two innings, Semple retained his place in the side, playing in all five of Otago's Shield matches during the season.

A regular in the Otago side throughout most of the 1960s, Semple made 33 first-class appearances for the provincial team, scoring 1,188 runs and taking four wickets. His highest score of 107 was made against Canterbury in 1969–70. This was his only first-class century. He bowled rarely after his first season, and all four of his senior wickets were taken in the same innings against Northern Districts in his third first-class match.
