= Russell Hendry =

New Zealand cricketer

Personal information
- Born: 2 March 1939 (age 87); Dunedin, Otago, New Zealand
- Batting: Right-handed
- Role: Batsman

Domestic team information
- Years: Team
- 1961/62–1973/74: Otago
- FC debut: 3 January 1962 Otago v Northern Districts
- Last FC: 7 January 1974 Otago v Canterbury
- LA debut: 2 December 1973 Otago v Canterbury
- Last LA: 9 December 1973 Otago v Auckland

Career statistics
Competition	First-class	List A
Matches	34	2
Runs scored	1,061	0
Batting average	18.61	0.00
100s/50s	0/5	0/0
Top score	87*	0
Catches/stumpings	18/–	0/–
- Source: ESPNcricinfo, 14 May 2016

Russell Hendry (born 2 March 1939) is a New Zealand former cricketer. He played 34 first-class and two List A matches for Otago between the 1961–62 and 1973–74 seasons.

Hendry was born at Dunedin in 1939 and educated at King's High School in the city. He played age-group cricket for Otago from 1957 to 1958 and first played for the provincial Second XI in 1960–61, before making his first-class debut for the representative team in a Plunket Shield fixture against Northern Districts at Carisbrook in January 1962. He scored a half-century on debut, part of a then-record Otago partnership of 123 against Northern Districts, and retained his place in the team for the remainder of the 1961–62 season.

Described as an "elegant right-handed batsman", Hendry was a regular member of the representative team until the end of the 1966–67 season. He scored half-centuries in 1962–63, 1964–65 and 1966–67, with a highest scored of 87 not out coming in January 1965 against Northern Districts. He played only twice in 1967–68 and then dropped out of the Otago team until the 1973–74 season when he returned to captain the team in five Plunket Shield matches. He scored another half-century, making 64 against Central Districts, and played both of his List A matches during the season, although he failed to score in either of his one-day innings. In total Hendry scored 1,061 first-class runs at a batting average of 18.61 runs per innings.

After his playing career, Hendry was an Otago Cricket Association board member for 15 years and in 2012 was elected as a life-member of the association. He played club cricket for Dunedin Cricket Club and published a history of the club.
