= William Higgins (New Zealand cricketer) =

New Zealand cricketer

Personal information
- Full name: William Lawrence Higgins
- Born: 15 November 1888; Dunedin, Otago, New Zealand
- Died: 3 July 1968 (aged 79); Ashburton, Canterbury, New Zealand

Domestic team information
- Years: Team
- 1910/11–1920/21: Otago
- Source: ESPNcricinfo, 14 May 2016

William Lawrence Higgins (15 November 1888 – 3 July 1968) was a New Zealand cricketer. He played seven first-class matches for Otago between the 1910–11 and 1920–21 seasons.

Higgins was born at Dunedin in 1888, the son of Lawrence Higgins, a sergeant in the New Zealand Army. The family were living in the Tuapeka area of North Otago when Higgins made his first-class debut for Otago, playing in a December 1910 match against Canterbury at Carisbrook. He recorded a duck in his first innings and scored 17 runs in the second.

After playing against Southland in 1911–12 (Note: This match is not considered first-class.) and against Auckland in the 1912–13 Plunket Shield, Higgins played three times during 1913–14. After serving in the New Zealand Army during World War I he played twice for the representative side in 1920–21, once against Canterbury before making his final first-class appearance against the touring Australians in March 1921. In his seven first-class matches he scored a total of 201 runs, including a highest score of 67 made against Canterbury during his final season of representative cricket.

Higgins died at Ashburton in Mid-Canterbury in 1968. He was aged 79.
