= Arthur Drabble =

New Zealand cricketer

Personal information
- Full name: Arthur Brownell Drabble
- Born: 12 February 1864; Llandudno, Wales
- Died: 28 July 1931 (aged 67); Warwick, England
- Role: Wicket-keeper

Domestic team information
- Years: Team
- 1884/84–1891/92: Otago
- Source: CricInfo, 8 May 2016

Arthur Brownell Drabble (12 February 1864 – 28 July 1931) was a Welsh-born cricketer. He played four first-class matches in New Zealand for Otago between the 1884–85 and 1891–92 seasons.

Drabble was born in Wales at Llandudno. His family migrated to New Zealand and he was educated at Otago Boys' High School in Dunedin. He worked as a farmer.
