= William Mackersy =

New Zealand cricketer

Personal information
- Full name: William Wallace Mackersy
- Born: 6 May 1875; Alexandra, Central Otago, New Zealand
- Died: 27 February 1959 (aged 83); Dunedin, Otago, New Zealand
- Bowling: Right-arm legbreak

Domestic team information
- Years: Team
- 1906/07–1907/08: Otago
- Source: ESPNcricinfo, 15 May 2016

William Wallace Mackersy (6 May 1875 – 27 February 1959) was a New Zealand cricketer. He played four first-class matches for Otago during the 1906–07 and 1907–08 seasons.

Mackersy was born at Alexandra in Central Otago in 1875. Professionally he was the general manager of the Milburn Lime and Cement company, retiring in 1944 after working for the company for 53 years. He made his first-class debut for Otago against the touring England team at Carisbrook in February 1907. Opening the bowling, Mackersy did not take a wicket during the match. The following season he played in all three of Otago's first-class fixtures, taking 10 wickets, seven of which were taken during his final representative match against Auckland in January 1908.

Mackersy was married with four children. He lived at Dunedin and died there in 1959. He was aged 83.
