= George Butlin =

New Zealand cricketer

Personal information
- Full name: George Louis Butlin
- Born: 11 July 1861; St Pancras, London, England
- Died: 10 July 1925 (aged 63); Kogarah, Sydney, Australia

Domestic team information
- Years: Team
- 1889/90: Otago
- Source: ESPNcricinfo, 6 May 2016

George Louis Butlin (11 July 1861 – 10 July 1925) was an English-born cricketer who played in New Zealand. He played one first-class match for Otago in 1889/90. Butlin was born in England and worked as a commercial clerk. Primarily a bowler, Butlin took three wickets in his only first-class match, a December 1889 fixture against Auckland at the Caledonian Ground in Dunedin. He died at Kogarah near Sydney in New South Wales in 1925. He was aged 63.
