= Frederick Haig =

New Zealand cricketer

Personal information
- Full name: Frederick Hill Haig
- Born: 23 April 1895; Wanganui, New Zealand
- Died: 3 December 1948 (aged 53); Dunedin, New Zealand

Domestic team information
- Years: Team
- 1919/20: Otago
- Source: ESPNcricinfo, 13 May 2016

Frederick Hill Haig (23 April 1895 – 3 December 1948) was a New Zealand cricketer. He played one first-class match for Otago during the 1919–20 season.

Haig was born at Wanganui in 1895. He played his only representative match for Otago in the March 1920 fixture against Southland at Rugby Park in Invercargill. He scored 13 not out in Otago's first innings and five in the second.

Haig worked as a saddler. He died at Dunedin in 1948 aged 53.
