= Robert Niven (New Zealand cricketer) =

New Zealand cricketer

Personal information
- Full name: Robert Campbell Niven
- Born: 11 December 1859; Emerald Hill, Melbourne, Victoria, Australia
- Died: 14 April 1919 (aged 59); Wellington, New Zealand
- Role: Wicketkeeper

Domestic team information
- Years: Team
- 1887/88–1888/89: Otago
- 1890/91–1901/02: Wellington

Career statistics
Competition	First-class
Matches	18
Runs scored	215
Batting average	10.75
100s/50s	0/0
Top score	42
Catches/stumpings	17/19
- Source: ESPNcricinfo, 20 September 2017

Robert Campbell Niven (11 December 1859 – 14 April 1919) was a New Zealand cricketer. He played first-class cricket for Otago and Wellington between the 1888–89 and 1900–01 seasons.

Niven, who was born at Emerald Hill in Melbourne, Australia in 1859, was regarded as one of New Zealand's best wicket-keepers of his time. He kept wicket for New Zealand in the three-day match against the Australians in 1896–97, when New Zealand fielded a side of 15. It was New Zealand's first international match.

Niven worked as chief clerk in the Government Insurance Department in Wellington. After contracting influenza during the 1918 flu pandemic he developed severe depression. His body was found in Wellington boat harbour on 14 April 1919. The subsequent inquiry found that he had drowned, but made no finding as to whether his death was the result of accident or suicide. He was aged 59 and left a widow but no other family.
