= William Douglas (cricketer, born 1903) =

New Zealand cricketer (1903–1981)

Personal information
- Full name: William Mackie Douglas
- Born: 6 June 1903; Dunedin, Otago, New Zealand
- Died: 5 July 1981 (aged 78); Auckland, New Zealand
- Batting: Left-handed
- Bowling: Slow left-arm orthodox
- Role: Bowler

Domestic team information
- Years: Team
- 1922/23–1928/29: Otago
- Source: ESPNcricinfo, 8 May 2016

William Mackie Douglas (6 June 1903 – 5 July 1981) was a New Zealand sportsman. He played 12 first-class cricket matches for Otago between the 1922–23 and 1928–29 seasons.

Douglas was born at Dunedin in 1903 and educated at Otago Boys' High School. Primarily a bowler at representative level, he played cricket and association football at school, winning the school's soccer prize in 1921. He played club cricket for the Carisbrook club in Dunedin and was first selected for the Otago practice squad in November 1922 ahead of the 1922–23 season's representative matches. He did not play in the side's first two matches of the season, before making his first-class debut in the final match against Wellington at Carisbrook in February 1923. He took a single wicket on debut in a timeless match that had to be cut short due to the commitments of the Wellington team to play in Christchurch the following week.

Douglas played twice for Otago in each of the next three season, taking 11 wickets in two matches in 1923–24, six in 1924–25 and three in 1925–26. He did to play the following season, but returned to the side in 1927–28, taking nine wickets in four matches, including the only five-wicket haul of his first-class career―five wickets for 88 runs taken against Wellington at Carisbrook. Although his top score in first-class matches was only 20 runs―generally batting last in the order―he was involved in a record last wicket partnership in New Zealand playing against Southland during the 1924–25 season. Douglas scored 35 not out in the partnership of 148 runs batting with Alec Knight. (Note: The partnership was reported as the highest last wicket partnership in first-class cricket in New Zealand in a 1931 report in the Wairarapa Daily Times but the match does not have first-class status.)

As well as cricket, Douglas played association football for Otago. He worked as a grocer. He moved to Auckland during the 1940s and died in the city in 1981 aged 78.
