= Arthur Kitt =

New Zealand cricketer

Personal information
- Full name: George Arthur Kitt
- Born: 1853; Shoreditch, Middlesex, England
- Died: 2 February 1940 (aged 86–87); Campbelltown, New South Wales, Australia

Domestic team information
- Years: Team
- 1886/87: Otago
- Source: ESPNcricinfo, 15 May 2016

George Arthur Kitt (1853 – 2 February 1940) was an English-born cricketer. He played one first-class match in New Zealand for Otago during the 1886–87 season.

Arthur Kitt was born at Shoreditch (Note: An obituary states that Kitt was born at Bath.) in England during early 1853, the son of James Kitt. He studied accountancy in London and later emigrated to New Zealand where he worked as a clerk in a variety of businesses. He married Caroline Jones at Dunedin in December 1883 before moving to Australia, taking up a position in Sydney. He later moved to Campbelltown, working first as a bookkeeper for E & W Fieldhouse, a stores company, before working for 25 years as the chief accountant for Newtown Municipal Council.

After playing club cricket in Dunedin for a number of years, including for the Carisbrook club, Kitt made his debut for Otago in a match against a touring Australian team in November 1886, featuring in a side made up of 22 players. (Note: This match is not considered first-class.) Later in the season he appeared in his only first-class match, opening the bowling for Otago against Canterbury at Lancaster Park in Christchurch in February 1887. He took only one wicket in a heavy defeat, although he scored 17 runs in Otago's first innings.

Kitt and his wife lived in Campbelltown for more than 40 years and had two children. He died at his home in 1940, aged 87.
