= Neil Rushton (cricketer) =

New Zealand cricketer

Personal information
- Full name: Neil William Rushton
- Born: 3 October 1976 (age 49); Oamaru, North Otago, New Zealand
- Batting: Right-handed
- Bowling: Left-arm medium

Domestic team information
- Years: Team
- 1999/00–2003/04: Otago
- 2000/01–2002/03: North Otago
- Source: CricInfo, 22 May 2016

Neil William Rushton (born 3 October 1976) is a New Zealand former cricketer. He played five first-class and ten List A matches for Otago between the 1999–2000 and 2003–04 seasons.

Rushton was born at Oamaru in North Otago in 1976 and was educated at Waitaki Boys' High School in the town. He played age-group and Second XI cricket for Otago during the 1990s before making his senior debut for the side in a List A match against Canterbury towards the end of December 1999. After taking two wickets on debut, Rushton played twice more for Otago during the season, taking two more wickets.

After not playing representative cricket the following season, Rushton made three first-class appearances for Otago during the 2000–01 season, although he only took two wickets. He returned to the side in 2002–03, taking two wickets in two first-class matches and two more in seven List A matches. He also played for North Otago in Hawke Cupmatches between 2000–01 and 2002–03.

After working in the construction industry, for Christchurch City Council and as a teacher at Waitaki Boy's High School, in 2014 Rushton graduated as a police constable from the Royal New Zealand Police College, going on to work in his home town.
