= Peter Marshall (cricketer) =

New Zealand cricketer (born 1963)

Personal information
- Full name: Peter Gordon Marshall
- Born: 4 April 1963 (age 63); Gore, Southland, New Zealand
- Batting: Left-handed
- Bowling: Left-arm medium
- Role: Bowler

Domestic team information
- Years: Team
- 1981/82: Southland
- 1991/92: Otago
- Source: ESPNcricinfo, 16 May 2016

Peter Gordon Marshall (born 4 April 1963) is a New Zealand former cricketer. He played five first-class matches for Otago during the 1991–92 season.

Marshall was born at Gore in the Southland Region in 1963. He played for the Southland cricket team in the early 1980s, including in the Hawke Cup during the 1981–82 season, and played age-group cricket for Otago during the same period.

Primarily a medium-paced bowler, Marshall did not make his senior representative debut until January 1992, going on to play in all of Otago's Plunket Shield matches during the second half of the 1991–92 season. He took 15 wickets, including best bowling figures of six wickets for 59 runs (6/59) against Central Districts in the team's final first-class match of the season. Despite this, he was not recalled to the side again.
