= Clem Beck =

New Zealand cricketer

Personal information
- Full name: Clement Henry Beck
- Born: 28 September 1863; Dunedin, New Zealand
- Died: 11 November 1957 (aged 94); Dunedin, New Zealand
- Role: Opening batsman

Domestic team information
- Years: Team
- 1884/85–1890/91: Otago
- FC debut: 20 February 1885 Otago v Canterbury
- Last FC: 23 February 1891 Otago v Canterbury

Career statistics
Competition	First-class
Matches	7
Runs scored	215
Batting average	16.53
100s/50s	0/0
Top score	48
Catches/stumpings	2/–
- Source: ESPNcricinfo, 30 March 2020

Clement Henry Beck (28 September 1863 – 11 November 1957) was a New Zealand cricketer. He played seven first-class matches for Otago between the 1884/85 and 1890/91 seasons.

A solid, effective opening batsman in an era of low scores, Clem Beck made 48 on his first-class debut in Otago's victory over Canterbury in 1884–85. He batted for four hours. He played against a touring Australian side in 1886, part of an Otago side of 22 players, and top-scored for Otago with 25 in their loss to the touring New South Wales team in February 1890, winning a bat in recognition. A month later, when Otago again beat Canterbury, he made 24 and 20 not out, the only batsman on either side to reach 20. In another victory over Canterbury in 1890–91, his last first-class match, he was the highest scorer in either side's first innings, with 32. He was later described as "a sturdy batsman, full of defence". He played club cricket for Dunedin and Carisbrook.

Beck also represented Otago at rugby union, playing for the representative side 10 times between 1885 and 1888, including in the first match between Otago and Southland in 1887 and against the touring British side in 1888. He played club rugby for the Montecillo and Dunedin clubs and was described in 1947 as having been an "outstanding forward". He was a life member of Dunedin Football Club and the President of Ocean Beach Cricket Club.

Beck was the head tinsmith for the Dunedin firm Kempthorne, Prosser & Co. Ltd. He married Barbara Alice Walker in Dunedin in March 1893; the couple had four children. She died at their home in the Dunedin suburb of St Kilda in February 1935. Beck died in November 1957, aged 94.
