= Thomas Parker (cricketer) =

English-born New Zealand cricketer

Thomas Speight Parker (29 August 1845 – 22 September 1880) was an English-born cricketer who played two first-class matches for Otago in New Zealand during the 1860s.

Parker was born at Bradford in Yorkshire in 1845. He played in two of the first four cricket matches to be played in New Zealand which have been awarded first-class status, both of them for Otago against Canterbury. His debut, which came in February 1865, was the first first-class match to be played on the Hagley Oval in Christchurch and the second match in New Zealand to be deemed first-class. In it Parker batted last in the Otago batting order, did not bowl, recorded a duck in his first innings and score one run in his second. Two seasons later he scored four runs batting higher up the Otago order in his only innings, took one wicket in Canterbury's first innings and recorded a five-wicket haul in their second, taking five wickets for six runs from nine overs of four balls each.

Parker worked as a wool broker. He died at Dunedin in Otago in 1880. He was aged 35.
