= Ata Matatumua =

Former Somoan cricket player

Personal information
- Full name: Ata Mamea Matatumua
- Born: 28 September 1940 (age 86); Apia, Western Samoa
- Batting: Right-handed
- Bowling: Right-arm medium

Domestic team information
- Years: Team
- 1966/67–1967/68: Otago

Career statistics
Competition	First-class
Matches	8
Runs scored	228
Batting average	16.28
100s/50s	0/1
Top score	69
Balls bowled	494
Wickets	18
Bowling average	27.44
5 wickets in innings	0
10 wickets in match	0
Best bowling	3/38
Catches/stumpings	4/–
- Source: CricketArchive, 16 June 2015

Ata Mamea Matatumua (born 28 September 1940) is a former Samoan cricketer who played in New Zealand domestic competitions in the 1960s. His first-class career consisted of eight matches for Otago.

== Life ==
A graduate of Samoa College, Matatumua is first recorded as playing in New Zealand during the 1960–61 season, when he appeared for a Wanganui district team in the Hawke Cup. A right-handed batsman and right-arm medium pacer, he played for the Otago under-23s during the 1963–64 season, but did not make his first-class debut until the 1966–67 season, in the Plunket Shield. On debut against Auckland in January 1967, Matatumua took 2/61 and 1/31 opening the bowling with another non-New Zealander, Barbadian Rudi Webster. Coming in eighth in the batting order, he made 24 in the first innings and a duck in the second, dismissed by future Test spinner Hedley Howarth in both instances.

Matatumua went on to feature in Otago's final two matches of the 1966–67 season, and all of its matches in the 1967–68 season. Still batting at number eight, in the opening match of the latter season, against Wellington, he scored 69 runs, his only first-class half-century. In the next match, a home fixture against Auckland at Dunedin's Carisbrook ground, Matatumua took career-best figures of 3/38 in the first innings, including the wickets of Test players Terry Jarvis and Graham Vivian. He finished the season with eight wickets at average of 34.75, behind only three players for Otago – Jack Alabaster (27 wickets), Gren Alabaster (19 wickets), and Rudi Webster (nine wickets).

In 1964 Matatumua also represented Otago in rugby league, while he was a playing member of the Samoana club. It was also the first year that Samoana played in the Otago Rugby League premier competition. While playing cricket in Dunedin, he represented the Otago University Club.

Professionally Matatumua worked as a doctor.
