= William Gollar =

New Zealand cricketer

Personal information
- Full name: William James Gollar
- Born: 11 March 1858; Hobart, Colony of Tasmania
- Died: 31 August 1916 (aged 58); Dunedin, Otago, New Zealand

Domestic team information
- Years: Team
- 1890/91: Otago
- Source: CricInfo, 12 May 2016

William James Gollar (11 March 1858 – 31 August 1916) was an Australian-born cricketer. He played one first-class match in New Zealand for Otago during the 1890–91 season.

Gollar was born at Hobart in the Colony of Tasmania in 1858. He worked as a baker and was a member of the Albion Cricket Club in Dunedin. Following his death at the age of 58 in 1916 an obituary was published in the 1917 edition of Wisden Cricketers' Almanack.
