= Wayne Martin (cricketer, born 1955) =

New Zealand cricketer (born 1955)

Personal information
- Full name: Wayne Stuart Martin
- Born: 23 December 1955 (age 70); Mosgiel, Otago, New Zealand
- Batting: Right-handed
- Bowling: Right-arm medium-fast
- Role: Bowler

Domestic team information
- Years: Team
- 1976/77–1978/79: Otago
- Source: ESPNcricinfo, 16 May 2016

Wayne Stuart Martin (born 23 December 1955) is a New Zealand former cricketer. He played one first-class and two List A matches between the 1976–77 and 1978–79 seasons.

Martin was born at Mosgiel in Otago in 1955. Described as a "brisk medium pace" bowler, he played club cricket for Taieri and age-group and B team cricket for the Otago cricket team from the 1975–76 season. He made his senior cricket debut playing for the New Zealand under-23 national side against Auckland in a December 1976 first-class match. Opening the bowling, he took four wickets in Auckland's first innings and made scores of 30 and three runs in the only first-class match of his career, an injury meaning that he was unable to bowl or field in Auckland's second innings.

Later in the season Martin made his representative debut for Otago, scoring 15 not out and taking one wicket in a List A match against Canterbury at Carisbrook in March 1977. His only other senior appearance for the side saw him take two wickets and score seven runs in another one-day match against the same side in November 1978.
