= William Robertson (Otago cricketer) =

New Zealand cricketer

Personal information
- Full name: William Alexander Robertson
- Born: 22 September 1940 (age 85); Ranfurly, Central Otago, New Zealand
- Batting: Right-handed

Domestic team information
- Years: Team
- 1960/61–1968/69: Southland
- 1960/61: Otago
- Source: CricInfo, 22 May 2016

William Alexander Robertson (born 22 September 1940) is a New Zealand former cricketer. He played four first-class matches for Otago during the 1960–61 season.

Robertson was born at Ranfurly in Central Otago in 1940. He played for Southland from the 1957–58 season, including in the Hawke Cup between 1960–61 and 1968–69, and for Otago age-group teams between 1958–59 and 1962–63.

All four of Robertson's first-class appearances for Otago came during the 1960–61 season. A right-handed batsman, he made his debut in the province's first Plunket Shield match of the season against Canterbury at Carisbrook as a replacement for Artie Dick who had injured his hand. After scoring 22 runs in his first innings before recording a duck in his second, Robertson retained his place in the team, although this remained his highest first-class score. He dropped out of the Otago team for the final Shield match of the season after having made a total of 43 runs in seven first-class innings.
