= William Tait (cricketer) =

New Zealand cricketer

Personal information
- Full name: William C Tait

Domestic team information
- Years: Team
- 1872/73–1874/75: Otago
- Source: ESPNcricinfo, 26 May 2016

William C Tait was a cricketer who played three first-class matches in New Zealand for Otago between the 1872–73 and 1874–75 seasons.

Tait was a member of Dunedin Cricket Club in Otago, serving on the committee and acting as the club's treasurer and vice-president. Described as "a fair change bowler" who "could bowl a good 'un at times", Tait played in three representative matches for Otago.

He made his first-class debut in Otago's February 1873 match against Canterbiry, taking four wickets in the only innings in which he bowled. He was considered one of the better members of an Otago team weakened by the absence of a number of established players. He played in the same fixture in each of the following two seasons, taking one wicket in each match. His highest first-class score of 21 not out was made in the 1873–74 match, the only one that Otago won. In total he scored 27 runs in the five innings in which be batted.

Little is known of Tait's life, although he is described as "the Victorian 'duffer'" in an 1874 article in The Evening Star, a Dunedin newspaper, suggesting that he may have been born in Australia.
