= Ernest Duret =

New Zealand cricketer

Personal information
- Full name: Ernest Francis de Montbrun Duret
- Born: 1856; Paris, France
- Died: 19 September 1926 (aged 69–70); Manly, Sydney, Australia

Domestic team information
- Years: Team
- 1886/87–1887/88: Wellington
- 1889/90: Otago
- Source: CricInfo, 8 May 2016

Ernest Francis de Montbrun Duret (1856 – 19 September 1926) was a French-born cricketer. He played first-class cricket in New Zealand for Otago and Wellington between the 1886–87 and 1889–90 seasons.

Duret was born at Paris in France in 1856. He worked as an agent.
