= Cliff Shirley =

New Zealand cricketer (1917–2001)

Personal information
- Full name: Clifford Vernon Shirley
- Born: 22 March 1917; Invercargill, New Zealand
- Died: 25 December 2001 (aged 84); Oamaru, New Zealand
- Batting: Right-handed
- Bowling: Right-arm medium
- Role: Occasional wicket-keeper

Domestic team information
- Years: Team
- 1940/41–1957/58: Southland
- 1954/55: Otago
- Source: ESPNcricinfo, 23 May 2016

Clifford Vernon Shirley (22 March 1917 – 25 December 2001) was a New Zealand cricketer. He played one first-class match for Otago during the 1945–46 season and played Hawke Cup and other matches for Southland for more than 15 seasons.

== Biography ==
Shirley was born at Invercargill in Southland in 1917 and was educated at Invercargill South school. He played club cricket for Colts and then for Appleby Cricket Club―a 1936 report credited him with being the side's "most dangerous" bowler and said that "he kept a good length and appeared to be unlucky not to get more wickets".

He made his Southland debut during a wartime match at Carisbrook against an Otago XI in January 1941, but war service meant he did not play again for the side until the end of 1944, although he did play cricket whilst a soldier. He continued to play for Southland until the 1957–58 season, making around 35 appearances for the team and, according to The Press in 1956, scoring over 1,000 runs. He played in two Hawke Cup matches during the 1954–55 season as Southland challenged for the trophy, and against touring sides from Australia, Fiji and the West Indies.

He was called into the side towards the end of the 1946 season following a number of good batting performances, with some commentators suggesting that he should have been called into the Otago side earlier in the season. A "sound and stylish" innings of 46 for Southland―who he was captaining―against Canterbury in January had been praised, and his 76 in the second innings of the match considered "bright". By March The Evening Star considered him "undoubtedly Southland's most stylish batsman" whilst the Otago Daily Times praised his "sound and polished stroke play" and the "crispness and certainty with which his strokes were made".

Shirley's only first-class match was against the touring Australians in March 1946 at Carisbrook. He scored 16 and 10 in his two first-class innings, although press reports suggest that he had started soundly in both innings and was unlucky to be out in his first innings.

During World War II Shirley served in Egypt with 20th Infantry Battalion, part of the 2nd New Zealand Division. After the war he worked as a legal clerk. In 1953, Shirley was awarded the Queen Elizabeth II Coronation Medal. He died at Oamaru in North Otago in 2001, aged 84. An obituary was published in the following year's New Zealand Cricket Almanack.
