= William Morrison (cricketer) =

New Zealand cricketer

Personal information
- Born: 21 May 1850; Alva, Clackmannanshire, Scotland
- Died: 31 October 1910 (aged 60); Dunedin, Otago, New Zealand

Domestic team information
- Years: Team
- 1876/77–1880/81: Otago
- Source: ESPNcricinfo, 18 May 2016

William Morrison (21 May 1850 – 31 October 1910) was a Scottish-born cricketer. He played two first-class matches in New Zealand for Otago, one in each of the 1876–77 and 1880–81 seasons.

Morrison was born at Alva in the Scottish county of Clackmannanshire in 1850. He made his representative debut for Otago against Canterbury in January 1877, opening the bowling and taking six wickets in Canterbury's first innings and three in their second. He played in an odds match against a touring English side later in the season and appeared against touring Australian sides in 1877–78 and 1880–81. He played his final first-class match during the latter season, not taking a wicket against Canterbury.

Morrison died at Dunedin in 1910. He was aged 60.
