= Henry Vallange =

New Zealand cricketer

Personal information
- Full name: William Henry Tracey Campbell Penney Vallange
- Born: 15 August 1864; Kensington, Middlesex, England
- Died: 7 February 1924 (aged 59); Southwark, Surrey, England
- Role: Batsman

Domestic team information
- Years: Team
- 1886/87: Otago
- Only FC: 24 February 1887 Otago v Canterbury
- Source: CricketArchive, 4 February 2024

William Henry Tracey Campbell Penney Vallange (15 August 1864 – 7 February 1924) was an English cricketer and medical doctor who played one first-class match in New Zealand for Otago.

Born at Kensington in London in 1864, Vallange spent a few years in Dunedin during the 1880s. He played club cricket for Carisbrook and rugby union for Pirates FC whilst in the city, serving on the Carisbrook committee.

Vallange played in an Otago team of 22 against the touring Australian side in November 1886, top-scoring for Otago with 18 runs in the team's first innings―the only batsman to reach double figures. Later in the season he played in Otago's only first-class match of the season. Playing against Canterbury, he scored 21 runs in the first innings and nine in the second.

In 1886 Vallange also played at fullback for the Otago Rugby Football Union representative side against Canterbury. Two years later he played for Otago against the touring British side led by Andrew Stoddart.

Vallange later studied medicine at the University of Edinburgh, qualifying as a doctor in 1894. He practised in London and died at Southwark in the city in February 1924. He was aged 59.
