= Victor Nicholson =

New Zealand cricketer

Personal information
- Full name: Victor Rylands Nicholson
- Born: 25 August 1892; Melbourne, Australia
- Died: 11 April 1946 (aged 53); Maungaturoto, New Zealand
- Source: ESPNcricinfo, 19 May 2016

Victor Rylands Nicholson (25 August 1892 – 11 April 1946) was a New Zealand cricketer. He played one first-class match for Otago in 1914/15.

Nicholson was educated at the Otago Boys' High School and Otago Medical School and worked as a surgeon at the Auckland Hospital. In 1928, he moved to England to work as a surgeon in Coventry, returning to New Zealand in 1945, where he worked as the superintendent of the Nurse Cavell Memorial Hospital in Paparoa. On 11 April 1946, Nicholson was travelling as a passenger in a truck from Pahi to Maungaturoto when the truck crashed into a creek near Maungaturoto. Another passenger managed to free the driver, but could not rescue Nicholson, who drowned in the truck.
