= Ronald Haley =

New Zealand cricketer

Ron Haley
Personal information
- Full name: Ronald William Robert Haley
- Born: 29 November 1941; Dunedin, Otago, New Zealand
- Died: 13 November 2023 (aged 81); Dunedin, Otago, New Zealand
- Batting: Left-handed
- Bowling: Right-arm fast

Domestic team information
- Years: Team
- 1970/71: Otago
- Source: ESPNcricinfo, 13 May 2016

Ronald William Robert Haley (29 November 1941 – 13 November 2023) was a New Zealand cricketer. He played one List A cricket match for Otago during the 1970–71 season.

Haley was born at Dunedin in 1941. He played age-group cricket for Otago during the 1964–65 season and Second XI matches for the representative side between 1965–66 and 1971–72 as well as playing for Dunedin Metropolitan. His only senior appearance for Otago came in February 1971 against the touring England Test side in a one-day match at Carisbrook, when Haley took two wickets, dismissing both opening batsmen, Brian Luckhurst and John Edrich.

Haley died in Dunedin in November 2023, aged 81.
