= William Johnston (cricketer) =

New Zealand cricketer

Personal information
- Born: 24 August 1867; Edinburgh, Scotland
- Died: 14 September 1947 (aged 80); Dunedin, Otago, New Zealand
- Role: Batsman

Domestic team information
- Years: Team
- 1889/90–1902/03: Otago
- Source: ESPNcricinfo, 15 May 2016

William Johnston (24 August 1867 – 14 September 1947) was a Scottish-born New Zealand cricketer. He played 20 first-class matches for Otago between the 1889–90 season and 1902–03.

Johnston was born at Edinburgh in Scotland in 1867. After migrating to New Zealand he worked as a caretaker. He made his representative debut for Otago in a December 1889 match against Auckland at the Caledonian Ground in Dunedin, scoring a total of six runs on debut. He played regularly in the provincial side until the 1902–03 season, making a total of 20 appearances in first-class matches in which he scored 434 runs with a highest score of 48, made against Canterbury in December 1898.

Johnston died at Dunedin in 1947 at the age of 80. An obituary was published in the 1949 edition of Wisden Cricketers' Almanack.
