= Michael MacKenzie (cricketer) =

New Zealand cricketer (born 1974)

Personal information
- Full name: Michael Curran MacKenzie
- Born: 18 September 1974 (age 51); Ranfurly, Central Otago, New Zealand
- Batting: Right-handed
- Bowling: Right-arm leg break
- Role: Bowler

Domestic team information
- Years: Team
- 1992/93: Otago
- Source: ESPNcricinfo, 15 May 2016

Michael Curran MacKenzie (born 18 September 1974) is a New Zealand former cricketer. He played two first-class matches for Otago during the 1992–93 season.

MacKenzie was born at Ranfurly in Central Otago in 1974. He played age-group cricket for Otago before making his senior representative debut for the team later in the 1992–93 season. Both of MacKenzie's first-class matches were Plunket Shield fixtures played in January 1993. Primarily a leg spin bowler, he took two wickets and scored nine runs in first-class cricket. He continued playing regularly for the Otago Second XI throughout the 1993–94 season and made a single appearance for the side in each of the 1995–96 and 2000–01 seasons.

After his career with Otago, MacKenzie became a player-coach for Taieri Cricket Club in Mosgiel. He played in more than 200 matches for the team, scoring 4,000 runs and taking 250 wickets.
