= William Lathbury =

New Zealand cricketer

Personal information
- Full name: William Henry Lathbury
- Born: 29 September 1843; Horninglow, Staffordshire, England
- Died: 7 March 1884 (aged 40); Charters Towers, Queensland, Australia
- Bowling: Fast

Domestic team information
- Years: Team
- 1875/76: Otago
- Only FC: 19 January 1876 Otago v Canterbury
- Source: ESPNcricinfo, 15 May 2016

William Henry Lathbury (29 September 1843 – 7 March 1884) was an English-born cricketer who played one first-class match in New Zealand for Otago during the 1875–76 season.

== Early and professional life ==
Lathbury was born at Horninglow in Staffordshire in 1843. He worked as a brewer, first at Burton upon Trent in England before emigrating to Sydney where he worked at Tooth and Co. where he was the chief brewer. In 1875 he moved to Dunedin in New Zealand to work at the new Albion Brewery in the city. He was described as "a thoroughly scientific man" who brought with him much experience in the industry.

== Cricket ==
Soon after arriving in New Zealand Lathbury joined Dunedin Cricket Club and soon developed a reputation as a fine batsman. The Otago Witness described him as a player with "a very free style" who "hits with great force to leg, and has a very nice way of cutting" whilst the Otago Daily Times commented that he "played very nicely".

Lathbury made his sole first-class cricket appearance for Otago in a January 1876 fixture against Canterbury at South Dunedin Recreation Ground. Described in the press as "a good bat with capital style; swift bowler; sure catch", he opened the bowling and took two wickets in Canterbury's first innings. He scored 42 and three runs in his two innings.

At the start of the following season Lathbury was considered to have been a success in Otago's side. The Saturday Advertiser was of the opinion that "he may be reckoned among our best all-round cricketers". The paper described his as playing "a hard, steady game" as a batsman and being a bowler with a "quick style of delivery and ready judgment, with an eye to a weak point", although it considered him not difficult to bat against. Although he did not play in Otago's match against Canterbury in 1876–77 in January, he did captain a side of 18 players against a touring English side led by James Lillywhite in March.By the 1877–78 season he had moved to Tasmania and played for a South Tasmania side against one from the north of the island.

== Later life and family ==
In early May 1876 Lathbury's wife, Louisa-May, gave birth to a son at Dunedin. She died a few days later. By 1884 Lathbury was living at Charters Towers in Queensland, still working as a brewer. He died there of natural causes in September aged 40.
