= Graeme Powell =

New Zealand cricketer (born 1947)

Personal information
- Full name: Graeme Arthur Powell
- Born: 2 January 1947 (age 79); Dunedin, New Zealand
- Batting: Right-handed
- Bowling: Right-arm fast-medium
- Role: Bowler

Domestic team information
- Years: Team
- 1969/70–1977/78: Otago
- Source: ESPNcricinfo, 21 May 2016

Graeme Arthur Powell (born 2 January 1947) is a New Zealand former cricketer. He played 19 first-class and 12 List A matches, all but one for the Otago cricket team between 1969–70 and 1977–78. He was born at Dunedin in 1947.

Primarily a right-arm fast-medium opening bowler, Powell played for Otago under-20s in the 1966–67 Brabin Tournament. He made his first-class debut against Canterbury at Lancaster Park in January 1970 before playing for the provincial under-23 side later the same month. Later in the season he played for New Zealand under-23s, including in a first-class fixture against the touring Australians, taking the wickets of both Australian opening batsmen. He made his List A debut the following season, playing for Otago against the touring England side. (Note: England played under the name Marylebone Cricket Club when playing non-international tour matches during this period. The team had played seven Tests in Australia before arriving in New Zealand where they played two more Test matches.) In total Powell took 48 first-class and 18 List A wickets, with best bowling figures of 5/45.
