= Robbie Lawson =

New Zealand cricketer (born 1974)

Personal information
- Full name: Robert Arthur Lawson
- Born: 14 September 1974 (age 52); Dunedin, Otago, New Zealand
- Batting: Right-handed
- Bowling: Right-arm off break
- Role: Batsman

Domestic team information
- Years: Team
- 1992/93–2003/04: Otago
- FC debut: 3 December 1992 Otago v Central Districts
- Last FC: 7 March 2004 Otago v Sri Lanka A
- LA debut: 3 January 1993 Otago v Wellington
- Last LA: 30 January 2004 Otago v Wellington

Career statistics
Competition	First-class	List A
Matches	73	93
Runs scored	3,278	2,291
Batting average	25.81	27.60
100s/50s	3/16	0/16
Top score	200	83*
Balls bowled	47	39
Wickets	2	0
Bowling average	9.00	–
5 wickets in innings	0	–
10 wickets in match	0	–
Best bowling	1/0	–
Catches/stumpings	28/–	26/–
- Source: CricInfo, 10 November 2023

Robert Arthur Lawson (born 14 September 1974) is a New Zealand former cricketer who played for Otago between the 1992–93 and 2003–04 seasons.

Lawson was born at Dunedin in Otago in 1974 and was educated at Otago Boys' High School in the city. A right-handed batsman who occasionally bowled off breaks, he played more than 160 top-level matches, almost all of them for Otago.

After playing age-group cricket for Otago in 1991–92, Lawson made his senior representative debut in a Plunket Shield match against Central Districts at Masterton in December 1992. He played for the New Zealand national under-19 cricket team in early 1993, for a New Zealand Emerging Players side during the following season and went on to play for the New Zealand Academy and for New Zealand A but was never capped internationally. He captained Otago and scored over 5,500 top-class runs during his career. He later served in the board of the Otago Cricket Association for nine years and was made a life member of the association in 2023.
