= Ronald Murdoch =

New Zealand cricketer (born 1945)

Personal information
- Full name: Ronald Lindsay Murdoch
- Born: 28 December 1945 (age 80); Dunedin, Otago, New Zealand
- Batting: Right-handed

Domestic team information
- Years: Team
- 1964/65: Otago
- 1971/72–1975/76: South Canterbury
- Source: ESPNcricinfo, 18 May 2016

Ronald Lindsay Murdoch (born 28 December 1945) is a New Zealand former cricketer. He played six first-class matches for Otago during the 1964–65 season.

Murdoch was born at Dunedin in 1945 and educated at Otago Boys High School in the city. He played age-group cricket for Otago from the 1963–64 season and made all six of his first-class appearances for the senior representative side the following season. As well as all five of Otago's Plunket Shield matches during the season, Murdoch played against the touring Pakistan Test side, scoring a total of 199 runs in his six first-class matches. Generally opening the batting for Otago, he made a score of 48 runs on debut against Canterbury before scoring his only half-century, a score of exactly 50 runs, against Auckland in his third match for the side.

Although Murdoch did not regain his place in Otago's Plunket Shield side after the end of the 1964–65 season, he played for age-group sides until the end of the 1967–68 season. Between 1971–72 and 1975–76 he played Hawke Cup cricket for South Canterbury.
