= Gordon Patrick =

New Zealand cricketer

Gordon Marlborough Patrick (9 November 1897 – 14 January 1964) was a New Zealand cricketer who played for Otago.

Patrick was born at Christchurch in 1897. He made a single first-class appearance for the team during the 1918–19 season in a match against Southland. He scored two runs in the first innings and recorded a duck in the second. He is also known to have played for a Waikato team against the touring England Test team in February 1930.

Professionally Patrick worked as a dental technician. He died in 1964 at Wellington.
