= Thomas Livingstone (cricketer) =

New Zealand cricketer

Thomas Oliver Livingstone (2 September 1889 – 20 May 1956) was a New Zealand cricketer who played three first-class matches for Otago during the 1917–18 season.

Livingstone was born at Dunedin in 1889. He played in all three of Otago's first-class matches during the 1917–18 season, making his debut against Canterbury at Christchurch in a match which started on Christmas Day 1917 before a match against Southland in March 1918 and Otago's second match against Canterbury. Primarily a bowler, he took nine wickets. All 14 of the runs he scored during his first-class career came in a single innings against Southland.

Livingstone died in the Sydney suburb of Balmain in May 1956. He worked there as an iron worker.
