= Richard Coulstock =

Australian cricketer

Personal information
- Born: 1823; Surrey, England
- Died: 15 December 1870 (aged 46–47); South Melbourne, Victoria, Australia

Domestic team information
- Years: Team
- 1855/56: Victoria
- 1863/64: Otago
- Source: Cricinfo, 7 May 2016

Richard Coulstock (1823 – 15 December 1870) was an Australian cricketer. He played two first-class cricket matches for Victoria and one match for Otago.

Coulstock was born in England in 1823. In 1863 he was employed as a groundsman by the Dunedin Cricket Club. He played for Otago in several matches in 1863–64, including New Zealand's first first-class match, against Canterbury. He returned to Australia and had been planning to return to England but, in December 1870, while batting at the South Melbourne Cricket Club, where he was the groundsman, he suffered a fatal heart attack.
