= Molyneux Park =

Sports complex in Alexandra, New Zealand

Coordinates: 45°14′35.75″S 169°23′00.92″E

- Interactive map of Molyneux Park

Ground information
- Location: Alexandra, New Zealand
- Country: New Zealand
- Establishment: 1961 (first recorded match)
- End names
- Old Man Range End; St Bathans End

Team information
Otago Women	(2006–present)
Otago	(1979–present)
- As of 3 November 2011; Source: Ground profile

Molyneux Park is a cricket ground and sports complex in Alexandra, Otago, New Zealand. It is the main sports venue for the Alexandra area.

Molyneux Park was developed in the 1960s and 1970s. As well as cricket, rugby, softball, netball and bowls facilities it has a seasonal outdoor ice skating rink, squash courts and the Alexandra bike park.

The first recorded cricket match on the ground came in January 1961 when Central Otago played the touring Marylebone Cricket Club. The ground held its first first-class match during the 1978/79 Shell Cup when Otago played Central Districts. The following season the first List A match was held there when Otago played Wellington in the 1980/81 Shell Trophy. Molyneux Park has been used as a home venue for Otago since then. As of early 2021 it had hosted 31 first-class matches, 66 List A matches, as well as 10 Twenty20 matches. Between 2006 and 2009, Otago Women used the ground for home matches in the State League.

Two Youth Test matches have been played there. The first came in 1999 when New Zealand Under-19s played England Under-19s, while the second saw New Zealand Under-19s play South Africa Under-19s. Three Youth One Day Internationals were also played there between 1993 and 1995. Molyneux Park is also the home ground for the Otago Country cricket team, which competes in the Hawke Cup.
