= Ron Silver (cricketer) =

New Zealand cricketer

Personal information
- Full name: Ronald Clifford Douglas Silver
- Born: 25 February 1910; Dunedin, New Zealand
- Died: 22 June 1984 (aged 74); Dunedin, New Zealand
- Batting: Right-handed
- Bowling: Right-arm medium
- Role: Bowler

Domestic team information
- Years: Team
- 1935/36–1945/46: Otago

Career statistics
Competition	First-class
Matches	14
Runs scored	175
Batting average	8.33
100s/50s	0/0
Top score	37*
Balls bowled	2,911
Wickets	49
Bowling average	27.22
5 wickets in innings	2
10 wickets in match	1
Best bowling	6/20
Catches/stumpings	11/–
- Source: CricInfo, 28 March 2023

Ronald Clifford Douglas Silver (25 February 1910 – 22 June 1984) was a New Zealand sportsman. He played 14 first-class cricket matches for Otago cricket team between the 1935–36 and 1945–46 seasons and 16 matches for the Otago Rugby Football Union.

Silver was born at Dunedin in 1910 and played cricket for the Albion club and rugby union for the Union club in the city. After his first-class debut, when he opened the bowling for Otago against Canterbury in the last match of the 1935–36 Plunket Shield and took five wickets, Silver was widely regarded as one of New Zealand's most promising pace bowlers. He took 3 for 34 and 5 for 20 in the first match of the 1936–37 Plunket Shield against Wellington, but was less successful in the later matches. He took his best figures in the first match of the Plunket Shield after World War II, 4 for 84 and 6 for 20, with Wellington dismissed for 42 in their second innings.

In his 14 first-class matches Silver took 49 wickets, including two five-wicket hauls. He also played rugby union as a full-back for Otago and Canterbury and played war-time matches for the New Zealand Army whilst serving in Christchurch.

Silver died at Dunedin in 1984 aged 74. An obituary was published in the New Zealand Cricket Almanack.
