= Bill Skitch =

New Zealand cricketer

Personal information
- Full name: William Henry Skitch
- Born: 31 August 1860; Bendigo, Victoria, Australia
- Died: 13 July 1944 (aged 83); Kawakawa, Northland, New Zealand

Domestic team information
- Years: Team
- 1883/84: Otago
- Source: CricInfo, 24 May 2016

William Henry Skitch (31 August 1860 – 13 July 1944) was a New Zealand cricketer. He played two first-class matches for Otago during the 1883–84 season.

Skitch was born at Bendigo in Australia and was educated at Bendigo School. After moving to New Zealand he was prominent in Otago cricket as a player, administrator and umpire for 34 years until he moved to Auckland for business reasons in 1907. He umpired seven first-class matches, six of them at the Carisbrook ground in Dunedin, between 1898 and 1903. He was elected a life member of the Dunedin Cricket Club, of which he was one of the founders, in 1901. He also won prizes as a professional sprinter and was a member of the Dunedin fire brigade teams that won competitions around New Zealand.

Skitch married Ellen Matilda Mariner in Dunedin in November 1881. She died at their home in Grey Lynn, Auckland, in May 1938. He moved to live with his son in Manurewa, and died in July 1944, aged 83.
