= Shane Robinson (cricketer) =

New Zealand cricketer (born 1967)

Personal information
- Full name: Shane Andrew Robinson
- Born: 24 August 1967 (age 59); Dunedin, Otago, New Zealand
- Batting: Right-handed
- Role: Wicket-keeper

Domestic team information
- Years: Team
- 1984/85–1996/97: Otago

Career statistics
Competition	First-class	List A
Matches	45	39
Runs scored	1,427	558
Batting average	20.98	19.92
100s/50s	0/6	0/0
Top score	93	44
Catches/stumpings	118/5	43/2
- Source: CricInfo, 22 May 2016

Shane Andrew Robinson (born 24 August 1967) is a former cricketer from New Zealand. He played 45 first-class and 39 List A matches for Otago between the 1984–85 and 1996–97 seasons.

Robinson was born at Dunedin in 1967. A wicket-keeper, he played for Otago age-group teams and for the New Zealand under-19 side during the 1984–85 season before making his representative debut for Otago in February 1985, towards the end of the domestic season. Playing as a specialist batsman, he made scores of two and 19 during the match, but with Warren Lees the incumbent wicket-keeper did not make another appearance for the provincial side until the 1987–88 season.

Kept out of the side by Lees, Robinson played age-group and Second XI matches and, in 1985–86, toured Australia with New Zealand Young Cricketers, playing in all three unofficial Test matches and all three youth One Day Internationals on the tour. Apart from a single List A appearance during 1987–88, again playing as a specialist batsman, he did not play for Otago again until the 1989–90 season when, following Lees' retirement, he became the first-choice wicket-keeper for the side.

Otago won the Plunket Shield in his first season as first-choice keeper, and Robinson played for the side until the 1996–97 season, playing regularly until the end of the 1995–96 season. Primarily known for his wicket-keeping rather than as a batsman, he was involved in over 150 dismissals for Otago and retired with the fifth most wicket-keeping dismissals in first-class cricket for the province. He scored almost 1,427 first-class runs for Otago, making a half-century six times―is highest score of 93 coming against Canterbury in his final season as first-choice 'keeper.

Since retiring as a professional, Robinson has worked in the real-estate industry. He continued to play club cricket for Green Island in Dunedin and was on the board of the Otago Cricket Association, serving as its chairman between 2019 and 2023. He was made a life-member of the Association in 2023.
