= Clive Geary =

New Zealand cricketer

Personal information
- Full name: Thomas Francis Clive Geary
- Born: 6 May 1922; Dunedin, Otago, New Zealand
- Died: 24 July 2004 (aged 82); Christchurch, New Zealand
- Batting: Left-handed
- Bowling: Right-arm medium

Domestic team information
- Years: Team
- 1940/41: Otago
- Source: CricInfo, 11 May 2016

Thomas Francis Clive Geary (6 May 1922 – 24 July 2004) was a New Zealand cricketer. He played one first-class match for Otago during the 1940–41 season.

Geary was born at Dunedin in 1922 and was educated at King's High School in the city. He worked as a teacher. As well as cricket, Geary played rugby union for Otago. In later life he was a selector for the Otago cricket team. Following his death in 2004 an obituary was published in the New Zealand Cricket Almanack.
