= Otago Country cricket team =

New Zealand cricket team

Personnel
- Owner: Otago Country Cricket Association

Team information
- Founded: 1946
- Home ground: Molyneux Park, Alexandra

History
- Hawke Cup wins: 2
- Official website: Otago Country Cricket

The Otago Country cricket team represents the Central Otago and South Otago regions of New Zealand. It is one of the 21 teams from around New Zealand that compete in the Hawke Cup. Its parent organisation is the Otago Country Cricket Association, which is based in Alexandra.

== Central Otago ==
The Central Otago Cricket Association was formed in 1946. It achieved Minor Association status with the New Zealand Cricket Council in 1956. Central Otago competed in the Hawke Cup from 1963 to 2006. They won the title once, when, captained by Ken McKnight, they defeated Taranaki in January 1996, Richard Hoskin scoring 74 and 162 and Shayne O'Connor taking eight wickets.

== Otago Country ==
In the early 2000s the Central Otago Cricket Association was renamed the Otago Country Cricket Association. It used to be made up of five sub-associations: Maniototo, South Otago, East Otago, West Otago and the Vincent Cricket Association. Now there are two: Central Otago and South Otago.

Otago Country have won the Hawke Cup once. Captained by Brendan Domigan, they defeated North Otago in January 2011.
