= List of Southland representative cricketers =

This is a list in alphabetical order of cricketers who played first-class cricket for the Southland cricket team in New Zealand. The team played its first representative match against Otago in 1864 but was not considered a Major Association until allowed to complete for the Plunket Shield for the first time during the 1914–15 season. It played eight first-class matches between then and the 1920–21 season, six of which were against the neighbouring Otago team. At the end of the 1920–21 season both Southland and Hawke's Bay were re-classified as Minor Associations, the New Zealand Cricket Council choosing to only include the four Major Associations that could reliably afford to travel to take part in an annual round robin tournament for the Plunket Shield. The province has played in the Hawke Cup since the inaugural competition in 1910–11 and were the first winners of the trophy.

The details are the player's usual name followed by the years in which he played first-class matches for the team. Many players will have played Hawke Cup and other matches for Southland and some may have represented other teams besides Southland.

== A ==
- Ralph Abercrombie (1920/21)

== B ==
- Hugh Bannerman (1914/15)
- Thomas Battersby (1914/15–1918/19)
- Thomas Bogue (1919/20–1920/21)
- Stanley Brown (1917/18)

== C ==
- Robert Camm (1919/20–1920/21)
- William Cockroft (1914/15)

== D ==
- James Darragh (1919/20)
- David Dixon (1919/20)
- Jack Doig (1914/15–1920/21)
- Alfred Driscoll (1914/15–1918/19)

== F ==
- Robert Fogo (1914/15–1919/20)

== G ==
- James Gilbertson (1914/15–1920/21)
- John Gilbertson (1914/15–1918/19)
- Horace Gleeson (1917/18–1920/21)
- Thomas Groves (1914/15-1920/21)

== H ==
- Dick Hallamore (1918/19)
- Archie Hamilton (1914/15–1920/21)
- Don Hamilton (1919/20)
- George Hammond (1920/21)
- Alick Handford (1914/15)
- Gilbert Heley (1917/18)

== J ==
- H. Jackson (1918/19) (Note: Jackson played a single match for the team, a March 1919 fixture against Otago. He scored two runs on Southland's first innings and six in the second. No other biographical details are known.)

== K ==
- Edward Kavanagh (1914/15–1920/21)
- Ernest Kemnitz (1914/15)
- George Kingston (1917/18)

== M ==
- Andrew McBeath (1919/20)
- Dan McBeath (1919/20–1920/21)
- G McBeath (1919/20) (Note: McBeath played in a December 1919 fixture against Otago. Opening the batting he scored 12 in Southland's first innings and eight in their second, each time being the team's second-highest scoring batsman. No other biographical details are known, although The Southland Times reported that he "has the makings of a good player, being young and keen" after the match, although it also criticised his batting technique. A G McBeath played for Wyndham Cricket Club during the 1920–21 season and is described as a bowler who "bangs the ball down at a terrific rate" and who was a member of the same family as Andrew and Dan McBeath.)

== O ==
- Horace Owles (1917/18)

== P ==
- Francis Petrie (1920/21)
- Arthur Poole (1914/15–1920/21)
- Thomas Pope (1920/21)

== R ==
- Stanley Raines (1919/20)

== S ==
- Edward Smith (1917/18)

== T ==
- Cecil Tapley (1914/15–1918/19)

== W ==
- Alfred Washer (1919/20)
- Steve Wilson (1917/18–1918/19) (Note: Wilson played in two first-class matches for Southland, both against Otago, scoring 29 runs with a highest score of 16.)

== Bibliography ==
- McCarron, Tony (2010). New Zealand Cricketers 1863/64–2010. Cardiff: The Association of Cricket Statisticians and Historians. ISBN 978 1 905138 98 2 (Available online at the Association of Cricket Statisticians and Historians.)
