= Alloo =

Alloo is a surname. Notable people with the surname include:

- Albert Alloo (1893–1955), New Zealand cricketer
- Arthur Alloo (1892–1950), New Zealand cricketer
- Cecil Alloo (1895–1989), New Zealand cricketer, brother of Albert and Arthur
- Yvette Alloo (1930–2020), Belgian Paralympic table tennis player
- Kumayl Alloo, Tanzanian-American Qur'an reciter
