= Thomas Bogue =

New Zealand cricketer (1893–1965)

Personal information
- Full name: Thomas Patrick Bogue
- Born: 5 December 1893; Wyndham, Southland, New Zealand
- Died: 27 September 1965 (aged 71); Invercargill, Southland, New Zealand
- Role: Wicket-keeper

Domestic team information
- Years: Team
- 1919/20–1927/28: Southland

Career statistics
| Competition | First-class |
|---|---|
| Matches | 2 |
| Runs scored | 5 |
| Batting average | 2.50 |
| 100s/50s | 0/0 |
| Top score | 5 |
| Catches/stumpings | 0/1 |
- Source: CricketArchive, 8 March 2024

Thomas Patrick Bogue (5 December 1893 – 27 September 1965) was a New Zealand cricketer. He played two first-class matches for the Southland cricket team, one in each of the 1919–20 and 1920–21 seasons and represented Southland in field hockey in 1915. He served in the New Zealand Army during World War I, seeing action on the Western Front where he was wounded twice.

== Early life ==
Bogue was born at Wyndham in the Southland Region of New Zealand in 1893 and educated in the town. He was the son of Daniel and Catherine (née Goodwin) Bogue. His father worked as a police constable in the town. Bogue joined the National Bank of New Zealand in 1911, working initially in the Wyndham branch as a clerk before transferring to the Dunedin branch in July 1915.

Growing up playing a variety of sports, Bogue was considered "well-known cricketer", having played for Wyndham Cricket Club. He also played field hockey, tennis and rugby union and was considered "a first-class draughts player".

As a hockey player Bogue was also considered "well-known" and had played in goal for Wyndham in the sport. In August 1915 he appeared as a replacement forward at half-time for the Southland hockey team in a representative match against Otago. In "rare form", he "played a rattling game", scoring two of Southland's three goals as the side won 3–0.

== Military service ==
Shortly after moving to Dunedin, Bogue enlisted in the New Zealand Expeditionary Force as a private in the 3rd battalion of the New Zealand Rifle Brigade. After training in New Zealand his unit left the country in February 1916, arriving at Suez in Egypt the following month. The brigade spent some time in Egypt before embarking for France and the Western Front in April.

He saw action at the front during the middle of the year and in September he was wounded in the leg. After time recuperating in England he returned to his unit in January 1917, serving at the front throughout much of the year. He was wounded again in October 1917, this time in the face and spent more time in hospital before rejoining the brigade for the remainder of the war. He returned to New Zealand in April 1919 and was discharged.

== Post-war career ==
On his return from the war Bogue returned to work for the National Bank of New Zealand. Initially working at Invercargill, where he joined Appleby Cricket Club in September 1919, he transferred to the banks' branch at Wyndham, his hometown, in October. When Wyndham Cricket Club was reformed later in the same month Bogue was elected as the vice-captain of the side, with Dan McBeath the club captain.

Playing alongside McBeath, Bogue made his representative debut for Southland in December, playing in a first-class fixture against Otago at Carisbrook in Dunedin. Playing as the side's wicket-keeper, he recorded a duck in Southland's first innings―caught from the second ball that he faced―and did not score in the second innings as Southland were defeated by an innings. He "nicely stumped" Alfred Eckhold off of McBeath's bowling and The Southland Times considered that "behind the stumps [he] was good", calling his stumping "smartly accomplished", and writing that "he took all the bowling well". It went on to write that "he did not get much of a chance to show his batting strength, going in late when the bowlers were in great form".

The following season he played in the first-class match against the touring Australian side in March 1921, scoring five runs in his only innings. By the start of the 1921–22 season he was playing for the Union Cricket Club in Invercargill. He kept wicket for Southland against Otago again in the annual representative match between the two sides played in February. (Note: This match is not considered to have first-class status.) He effected two stumpings in Otago's first innings in what the Otago Daily Times called "a very good display behind the wickets" and made scores of one and nine runs in his two innings as Southland again lost by an innings.

By October 1922 the cricket correspondent for The Southland Times was of the view that "on his form of the last two seasons, Bogue is going the right way to land himself in a New Zealand team". He was selected in Southland representative teams against Otago and Ashburton County during the season, recording a pair against Otago. He also played in the side's representative match against Wellington later in the season and in the return match against Otago at Easter. (Note: None of these matches have first-class status. Southland was reclassified as a Minor Association before the start of the 1922–23 season. All eight of the matches the province played which have first-class status were played between 1914–15 and 1920–21.)

By this time Bogue was working at Mataura and barely played cricket during the 1923–24 season. When he could play towards the end of the season The Southland Times again admired his wicket-keeping. Playing for a Northern Districts team against an Invercargill representative side, the paper said that he "gave a fine exhibition behind the sticks, and it is evident that there is not much wrong with this brilliant young performer of a few years ago. It is to be hoped that he will be back in the game before long, as wicket-keepers of the class of him and Jim Gilbertson are not often met with in the South Island these days."

The paper was similarly generous in praise for Bogue during the following season. After playing a trial match in January 1925 it wrote that "it was evident that he still retains much of his old brilliance behind the sticks" and that "he would strengthen the next Southland team". After playing club cricket at Wyndham, Bogue was a founder member of the newly formed Mataura Cricket Club founded in September 1926, serving as the club's first secretary. He played a final representative match for Southland in 1927–28, a rain-affected match against the touring Australian side played at Invercargill.

Bogue continued playing club cricket into the 1940s and took up golf. He died at Invercargill in 1965. He was aged 71.
