= Ronald Bannerman =

New Zealand flying ace (1890–1978)

Ronald Burns Bannerman CBE DFC*
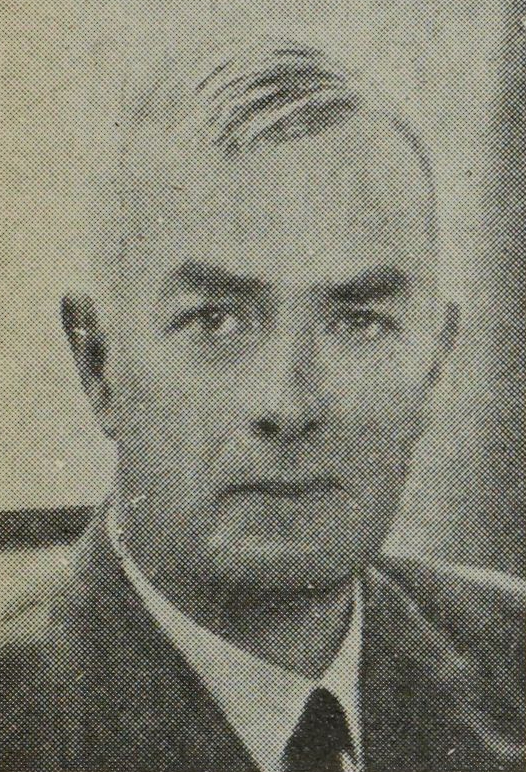
- Born: 21 September 1890; Invercargill, New Zealand
- Died: 2 August 1978 (aged 87); Gore, New Zealand
- Relatives: Hugh Bannerman (brother); Wilfred Bannerman (brother)
- Military career
- Allegiance: New Zealand
- Branch: Aviation
- Service years: 1917–1945
- Rank: Captain (later Air Commodore)
- Unit: No. 79 Squadron RAF
- Awards: Commander of the Order of the British Empire, Distinguished Flying Cross and Bar
- Other work: Air Member for Personnel in the RNZAF November 1942–October 1945; Aide de Camp to the Governor-General 1943–1945

Air Commodore Ronald Burns Bannerman CBE DFC* was a flying ace during World War I, as well as serving as a high level administrator for his native New Zealand's air force during World War II.

== Early life and training ==
Ronald Burns Bannerman was born on 21 September 1890 in Invercargill, the youngest of three children of accountant William D. D. Bannerman (1859–1942) and Agnes Gibson McEwen (circa 1858–1931). Both of his brothers, Hugh and Wilfred Bannerman played first-class cricket before World War I. The younger Bannerman's education took him from Otago Boys' High School onward to study law at Otago University. He was living at 35 Neidpath Road, Mornington in Dunedin when he enlisted for service in New Zealand's Armed Forces. By 1916 he had risen to the rank of sergeant-major in the 4th Otago Regiment.

He enrolled in March 1916 at the New Zealand Flying School which was located at Mission Bay in Auckland. One of 12 pupils at the school, he was the last of them to qualify, obtained his flying certificate (with only four flying hours in his logbook) in a Curtiss Flying Boat on 16 December 1916.

After a voyage to England, he joined the Royal Flying Corps on 29 March 1917 and undertook further training, amassing 53 hours solo flight time. After initial instruction on a Farman Shoehorn, he gained experience with the Avro 504, before progressing onto the more powerful Bristol Scout, Sopwith Pup, SPAD S.VII, Sopwith Dolphin and the SE5a. During his training in England Bannerman was nearly killed while sitting in his Avro aircraft when another aircraft accidentally landed on top of his, reducing it in Bannerman's words to matchwood.

== War service ==
He was posted to France in February 1918 joining the freshly formed No. 79 Squadron RAF.

He flew a Sopwith Dolphin, scoring his initial victory on 4 August 1918 by destroying a Fokker D.VII.

During August and September he shot down 12 aircraft and a balloon before a period on leave. Upon his return to the front he added more victories to bring his total to 17, with his last triumph coming on 4 November 1918, a week before war's end. His first 15 wins were achieved flying Sopwith Dolphin #C3879; his last two were scored from Dolphin #E4716. His final tally included 16 enemy airplanes destroyed and 22 driven down out of control. He was also a balloon buster, having downed a Drachen on 24 August for his fourth victory. What makes Bannerman's string of victories more remarkable was that the engine of the Dolphin was notorious for its unreliability and his log book records many engine failures, which would have reduced his time in the air. Also 79 Squadron was tasked for ground attack work; none of his victories were scored above 5,000 feet altitude. Indeed, there were only four other aces in the unit: Francis W. Gillet, Frederic Ives Lord, John McNeaney, and Edgar Taylor.

Bannerman ended the war a Captain with two awards of the Distinguished Flying Cross. He had 396 hours flight time and approximately 190 combat sorties. He was New Zealand's top ranking ace.

== List of victories ==
Victory nº	Date	Hour	Bannerman's unit	Bannerman's aircraft	Opponent/s aircraft	Location
1	4 August 1918	0840	79	Sopwith Dolphin (C3879)	Fokker D.VII	Neuve Eglise
2	20 Aug 1918	1845	79	Sopwith Dolphin (C3879)	LVG C	Estaires
3	22 Aug 1918	0945	79	Sopwith Dolphin (D8075)	DFW C	West of Bailleul
4	24 Aug 1918	1305	79	Sopwith Dolphin (C3879)	Balloon	West of Armentières
5	29 Aug 1918	1740	79	Sopwith Dolphin (C3879)	Hannover C	East of Estaires
6	31 Aug 1918	1915	79	Sopwith Dolphin (C3879)	LVG C	Northeast of Estaires
7	07 Sep 1918	1100	79	Sopwith Dolphin (C3879)	LVG C	NE of Ploegsteert
8	16 Sep 1918	1145	79	Sopwith Dolphin (C3879)	LVG C	N of Hollebeke
9	16 Sep 1918	1200	79	Sopwith Dolphin (C3879)	LVG C	Hooge
10	19 Sep 1918	0735	79	Sopwith Dolphin (C3879)	Fokker D.VII	East of Houthoulst Wood
11	21 Sep 1918	1015	79	Sopwith Dolphin (C3879)	LVG C	Southwest of Hollebeke
12	28 Sep 1918	1235	79	Sopwith Dolphin (C3879)	Fokker D.VII	Southwest of Comines
13	29 Sep 1918	1740	79	Sopwith Dolphin (C3879)	Hannover	Estaires
14	27 Oct 1918	0815	79	Sopwith Dolphin (C3879)	Halberstadt C	East of Avelghem
15	01 Nov 1918	1500	79	Sopwith Dolphin (C3879)	Fokker D.VII	Audenarde
16	02 Nov 1918	1000	79	Sopwith Dolphin (E4716)	Halberstadt C	Salsique
17	04 Nov 1918	1245	79	Sopwith Dolphin (E4716)	LVG C or DFW	Baeggem

== Return to civilian life ==
He continued flying and other duties after the armistice, including serving in the Army of Occupation in Belgium and as an instructor of fighter tactics and aerobatics in Britain. By the time he closed his pilot's log for good in June 1919, he had more than 500 hours flying time. He was transferred to the RAF's Unemployed List on 16 August 1919.

By September 1919 he had returned home, where he begin a distinguished long career as a lawyer first in Dunedin and then at Gore where he entered into partnership with Edmund Robert Bowler (1866–1927), who had served as a Lieutenant-Colonel at Gallipoli. The firm was initially known as Bowler & Bannerman until Bowler's retirement in February 1927.

Bannerman remained a member of the Otago Regiment and then with the Southland Regiment until May 1924. He transferred to the Territorial Air Force, where he remained until he retired in June 1930 with the rank of flight lieutenant. He then had little to do with aviation for the next decade.

== World War II ==
After the outbreak of World War II he rejoined the RNZAF in September 1940.

He rose to become the Air Member for Personnel for the RNZAF from November 1942 to October 1945, achieving the rank of Air Commodore in the process. In the 1945 King's Birthday Honours, he was appointed a Commander of the Order of the British Empire for his services.

== Later life ==
He resumed his legal career after World War II.

Together with Keith Caldwell and Leonard Isitt he was instrumental in establishing the New Zealand 1914–1918 Airmen's Association in 1960.

In the 1960s he initiated negotiations with landowners and the council to establish and develop a reserve of seven hectares on the site of the original Gore Cemetery. In honour of his efforts the resulting park was named Bannerman Park in 1977.

He died at his home in Gore, New Zealand on 2 August 1978.

== Personal life ==
In 1917 he married Mona Campbell (1895– ). They subsequently had three children, John Rushford Bannerman, Margaret Elles Bannerman and Lindsay Burns Bannerman.

== Citations for military honours ==
Distinguished Flying Cross (DFC)

Lieut. Ronald Burns Bannerman.

"During recent operations this officer has done gallant service. While on an offensive patrol with two other machines he was attacked by several Fokker biplanes, and, in the engagement, he shot down one. In addition, he has destroyed four other enemy machines."

Distinguished Flying Cross (DFC) Bar

Lieut. (A./Capt.) Ronald Burns Bannerman, D.F.C. (FRANCE)

"A leader whose ability inspires confidence in those who serve with him. During the operations in September he accounted for six enemy machines, displaying marked courage and judgment."
