= Kenneth Nicholson =

New Zealand cricketer (born 1945)

Personal information
- Full name: Kenneth Alan Nicholson
- Born: 7 August 1945 (age 81); Otautau, New Zealand
- Batting: Right-handed
- Bowling: Right-arm medium
- Relatives: Ross Nicholson (brother)

Domestic team information
- Years: Team
- 1962/63–1976/77: Southland
- 1964/65: Ashburton County
- 1971/72–1972/73: Otago
- Source: ESPNcricinfo, 19 May 2016

Kenneth Alan Nicholson (born 7 August 1945) is a New Zealand former cricketer and journalist. He played one first-class and three List A matches for Otago between 1971 and 1973. Nicholson also played for Southland cricket team for 20 years. In November 1988, Nicholson, then a journalist, and Jeremy Coney played as substitute fielders in New Zealand's Test match against India in Bangalore, after several members of the New Zealand team went down with illness.
