= Stanley Brown (cricketer, born 1885) =

New Zealand cricketer (1885–1945)

Personal information
- Full name: Stanley Eric Vincent Brown
- Born: 28 August 1885; Temuka, South Canterbury, New Zealand
- Died: 21 January 1945 (aged 59); Invercargill, Southland, New Zealand

Domestic team information
- Years: Team
- 1917/18–1923/24: Southland

Career statistics
Competition	First-class
Matches	1
Runs scored	12
Batting average	12.00
100s/50s	0/0
Top score	8
Balls bowled	54
Wickets	1
Bowling average	46.00
5 wickets in innings	0
10 wickets in match	0
Best bowling	1/46
Catches/stumpings	0/–
- Source: CricketArchive, 9 March 2024

Stanley Eric Vincent Brown FRCS (28 August 1885 – 21 January 1945) was a New Zealand cricketer and doctor. He played one first-class cricket match for the Southland cricket team during the 1917–18 season and captained the team in other representative matches.

Brown was a surgeon who worked particularly in the field of orthopaedic surgery during World War I. He served in the New Zealand Medical Corps at the end of the war and spent most of his life practicing medicine in Invercargill in the Southland Region of New Zealand. He was also a noted vocalist and conductor, and played rugby union during his youth.

== Early life and education ==
Brown was born in Temuka in South Canterbury in 1885, the son of Elijah Brown, an ironmonger and timber merchant. He was educated at Waitaki Boys' High School in Oamaru before studying medicine at the University of Otago School of Medicine in Dunedin. After qualifying in 1908, he took up a position at Wellington Hospital as a house officer for two years before moving to London, England, to further his studies in 1910.

== Professional career ==
In London, Brown worked at the London Hospital and Middlesex Hospital. He qualified as a Licentiate of the Royal College of Physicians and a Member of the Royal College of Surgeons in 1910 and as a Fellow of the Royal College of Surgeons in 1913. He played rugby union for the London Hospital side, playing as both a full-back and half-back, as well as representing the South Eastern Counties side.

Brown returned to New Zealand in 1914. He ran Whanganui Hospital for a short time before being appointed to the post of medical superintendent at Southland Hospital in Invercargill the following year. After volunteering for service with the New Zealand Medical Corps (NZMC), he was initially refused permission to serve overseas, his role at Invercargill being deemed too important. In November 1918, however, he was commissioned as a captain in the NZMC and served overseas, initially on SS Maheno, a civilian vessel chartered for use as a hospital ship, and then in England between February and August 1919.

In England, Brown studied orthopaedic surgery techniques, and when he returned to New Zealand he worked for a time as an orthopaedic surgeon at the Chalmers Military Hospital at Christchurch, an institution established to treat injured servicemen, with the rank of temporary major. After being demobilised in July 1920, he moved back to Invercargill, establishing a medical practice of his own in the city. He remained in practice in Invercargill for the remainder of his life.

== Sporting life ==
An obituary describes cricket as "the game in which he was most keenly interested" and he played for the Southland cricket team in a number of representative matches. One of these, a March 1918 fixture against Otago, has first-class status. (Note: The Southland cricket team had first-class status between 1914–15 and 1921–22, playing eight matches which are considered to be first-class. The team played other representative matches during this period which are not considered first-class.) In the match, a heavy defeat for Southland, Brown scored eight runs in the first innings and four not out in the second. He played in a number of other representative matches for Southland and captained the team at times.

As well as playing the game, Brown was involved in the administration of Invercargill Cricket Club, serving on the club's committee, and of the Southland Cricket Association. He served on the association's executive and was its president until he resigned in 1930 following a dispute with another executive member, Albert Keast. He was involved in coaching cricket, including at Southland Boys' High School, Southland Girls' High School, and the Southland Colts side. In 1938 he and Jack Doig were elected as the first two life members of Invercargill Cricket Club.

As a young man, Brown played rugby football as a back. Whilst studying in England he represented the London Hospital and South Eastern Counties sides; The Times praised his "resolute defence" in a match between London Hospital and Guy's Hospital in March 1911. He remained involved with the game as an administrator and referee in later life.

Brown also played golf. He was considered "a very fair exponent" of the game and was a member of Invercargill Golf Club.

== Personal life ==
A noted singer, Brown performed regularly with choirs and in other performances. He was considered "so well known that it is unnecessary to sing his praises. You must hear him sing once more and the praises will follow as a matter of course" by The Southern Cross in 1918. He conducted the Invercargill Male Choir from 1933 until 1941 and was later elected a life member. He was a leading member of the Invercargill Orphans' Club, various Methodist organisations and a founder member of the Southland branch of the Automobile Association of New Zealand, serving as its president during the 1920s.

Brown married Lena Walton of Upper Kew in Dunedin in 1915. (Note: Walton's fullname was Margaret Ann Selina Walton. She was born in 1885 and died in 1974.) The couple had two children, a son and a daughter. Their son, Rutherford Brown, qualified as a dispensing chemist and served in the New Zealand Medical Corps during World War II. He was captured during the invasion of Crete in 1941 and spent three years as a prisoner of war in Germany before being repatriated in 1944.

Brown died at his home in Invercargill in 1945 after a period of illness. He was aged 59.
