= Ralph Abercrombie (cricketer) =

New Zealand cricketer

Personal information
- Full name: Thomas Ralph Abercrombie
- Born: 7 December 1891; Dunedin, Otago, New Zealand
- Died: 28 July 1958 (aged 66); Wellington, New Zealand
- Role: Batsman

Domestic team information
- Years: Team
- 1920/21–1923/24: Southland

Career statistics
Competition	First-class
Matches	1
Runs scored	1
Batting average	1.00
100s/50s	0/0
Top score	1
Catches/stumpings	0/–
- Source: CricketArchive, 3 March 2024

Thomas Ralph Abercrombie (7 December 1891 – 28 July 1958) was a New Zealand bank official and cricketer. Known as TR Abercrombie or Ralph Abercrombie, (Note: For example, in press reports where he is never referred to as Thomas Abercrombie. Cricket sources are the only ones which refer to him as Thomas alone.) he played one first-class match for the Southland cricket team during the 1920–21 season.

Abercrombie worked for the National Bank of New Zealand throughout his working life, becoming a manager at Wellington by the end of his career. He was active in a variety of sports and served during World War I in the New Zealand Expeditionary Force, being wounded twice and winning a commission during the war.

== Early life ==
Abercrombie was born at Dunedin in 1891 and educated at High Street School in the city. He was the second son of George Lachlan Abercrombie and his wife Jeannie, both of whom were born in the United Kingdom and had married in Australia, where their oldest son was born, before moving to New Zealand in 1891. The family had moved to live at Owaka by 1893, before moving to Alexandra in 1900 and then back to Dunedin in 1902, living in the Andersons Bay area of the city.

After leaving school, Abercrombie worked for the National Bank of New Zealand at Port Chalmers. He enlisted in the New Zealand Expeditionary Force in December 1914, soon after the outbreak of World War I.

== Military service ==
During the war Abercrombie served in the Otago Infantry Regiment (OIR), enlisting as a private in December 1914. He embarked as a member of the 3rd reinforcements in February 1915, arriving at Suez in Egypt in late March. Late the following month he took part in the landing at Anzac Cove, the initial stage of the Gallipoli campaign. Serving in the 4th company of the Otago battalion, (Note: Initially the Otago Regiment was a battalion. At Gallipoli it served as part of the New Zealand and Australian Division as the New Zealand forces did not have enough men to form their own division. After the evacuation from Gallipoli the strength of New Zealand forces in Egypt was enough to form the New Zealand Division and the battalion became a regiment.) Abercrombie spent over three months on active service on the Gallipoli peninsula, during which time the battalion took significant casualties. In early August he took part in the landing at Suvla Bay, the final attempt by the British and Empire forces to break the stalemate at Gallipoli. He was wounded in the face on 7 August during the Battle of Chunuk Bair and was evacuated from the peninsula, first to Malta before being sent to England where he spent five months at the 2nd Western General Hospital in Manchester.

Abercrombie rejoined his unit in Egypt in January 1916 before the regiment sailed for France in April. Promoted to the rank of corporal, he saw action on the Western Front and was wounded again on 14 July whilst serving in the Armentières area during the early stages of the Battle of the Somme. (Note: The New Zealand Division did not play an active role in the Somme offensive until September 1916.) This time his wounds were in his foot and thigh, and Abercrombie was evacuated to hospital in London before spending time in the New Zealand Convalescent Hospital at Grey Towers in Essex.

After being released from hospital in September 1916, Abercrombie spent nine months at the New Zealand Command Depot at Codford in Wiltshire to further recuperate. He acted as the orderly room clerk for four months and was promoted to the rank of sergeant. In May 1917 he was posted back to France, serving with the 3rd battalion of the OIR, during which time the New Zealand Division saw action at Messines and St. Yves. In July Abercrombie was identified as a candidate for officer training and left the unit, returning to England for training.

Promoted to the rank of second lieutenant in November, Abercrombie did not rejoin his unit, instead being posted back to New Zealand, arriving at Wellington in March 1918. Later in the month he married Beatrice Dunsford at Roslyn in Dunedin. He remained in New Zealand for the remainder of the war and was demobilised in January 1919.

== Sporting life ==
Before the war Abercrombie played cricket in Dunedin. After moving to Invercargill he played for Invercargill Cricket Club's senior XI, primarily as a batsman. Considered a "steady" batsman who preferred to play the ball along the ground rather than giving chances, he played in one first-class match for the Southland cricket team. He scored a single run in a weather-effected match against the touring Australians in March 1921. This was the last of Southland's eight first-class matches; the team was re-classified as a Minor Association before the start of the 1921–22 season.

Abercrombie played other representative matches for Southland. In February 1922 he opened the batting for the side in the annual match against Otago, top-scoring with 19 runs in Southland's first innings, and in December 1923 played against Ashburton County cricket team, making scores of 7 and 17, again opening the batting. He served on the committee of the Invercargill club, was elected club captain during the 1923–24 season, and was one of Southland's selectors during the 1925–26 season.

Away from cricket, Abercrombie took up golf in 1925, playing the game regularly for many years. He was the club captain at Riverton golf club when he lived in the town and served on the committee of the Southland Golf Association. He was also an angler and served on the committee of the Aparima Anglers' Club, including acting as a vice-president of the club.

== Professional and personal life ==
After he was demobilised from the army in January 1919, Abercrombie returned to work for the National Bank of New Zealand. He was transferred to Invercargill in Southland and was promoted to the role of accountant at the Invercargill branch in June 1928. In early-July 1930 he was promoted to manage the bank's branch at Riverton in eastern Southland.

After nearly six years at Riverton, in early 1936 Abercrombie was transferred to the manager's job at Lower Hutt, near Wellington on New Zealand's North Island, leaving Southland in March. He spent 12 years at Lower Hutt before being transferred to the bank's national headquarters in Wellington in 1948.

Abercrombie and his wife had two daughters. He died at Wellington in 1958 at the age of 66.
