= Wilfred Bannerman =

New Zealand cricketer

Personal information
- Full name: Wilfred Elles Bannerman (Note: Bannerman's middle name is spelled Elles according to his army records, where it has been corrected to be spelled this way on occasions. A number of sources spell it Ellis.)
- Born: 8 September 1888; Ophir, New Zealand
- Died: 8 February 1944 (aged 55); Martinborough, New Zealand
- Height: 5 ft 9 in (1.75 m)
- Relatives: Hugh Bannerman (brother); Ronald Bannerman (brother)

Domestic team information
- Years: Team
- 1911/12–1914/15: Otago
- FC debut: 23 December 1911 Otago v Canterbury
- Last FC: 17 February 1915 Otago v Southland

Career statistics
Competition	First-class
Matches	3
Runs scored	24
Batting average	6.00
100s/50s	0/0
Top score	9
Balls bowled	204
Wickets	4
Bowling average	32.50
5 wickets in innings	0
10 wickets in match	0
Best bowling	3/75
Catches/stumpings	3/–
- Source: Cricinfo, 1 January 2022

Wilfred Elles Bannerman (8 September 1888 – 8 February 1944) was a New Zealand cricketer. He played in three first-class cricket matches for Otago between the 1911/12 and 1914/15 seasons.

== Early life ==
Bannerman was born at Ophir in Central Otago in 1888, the second son of William and Agnes Bannerman. His father worked for the Bank of New Zealand and Bannerman worked as a bank clerk. He had two brothers, the journalist Hugh Bannerman and the lawyer Ronald Bannerman; all three of the brothers attended Otago Boys' High School in Dunedin.

== Cricket ==
Bannerman played club cricket for Carisbrook Cricket Club and for the Bank of New Zealand, and made his Plunket Shield debut for Otago in December 1911 in a match against Canterbury. He played in two more first-class matches for Otago, one against Canterbury in December 1912 and the last against Southland in February 1915, as well as playing in at least two non first-class matches for the side.

== War service ==
By the time Bannerman played his final first-class match World War I had broken out and, shortly after his final match for Otago, he joined the New Zealand Army. He passed his medical in April 1915 and was posted to the Otago Infantry Regiment. He was promoted to lance-corporal and later in the year embarked for Egypt where he served until he was declared unfit for active service on account of flat feet and varicose veins in his left foot―conditions which had been noted when he attested but which had been exacerbated by his service. He was sent back to New Zealand, arriving in 1917, and was awarded the British War Medal and Victory Medal.

== Family and later life ==
Both of Bannerman's brothers also served during World War I. His younger brother Ronald joined in 1916, serving in the Royal Flying Corps and Royal Air Force where he became a flying ace and was awarded the Distinguished Flying Cross and bar. During World War II he rejoined the Royal New Zealand Air Force, reaching the rank of Air Commodore. His old brother Hugh attested in 1917 and served as a lieutenant in 7 battalion, Otago Regiment. He was killed in action on the Ypres Salient shortly after arriving in Belgium in December 1917.

Bannerman died at Martinborough near Wellington in 1944. He was aged 55.
