= Andrew Ratcliffe =

Andrew Ratcliffe may refer to:

- Andrew Ratcliffe (cricketer) (1891–1974), Australian first-class cricketer
- Andrew Ratcliffe (sprinter) (born 1955), Australian athletics competitor
