= Thomas Battersby =

Thomas Battersby may refer to:

- Thomas Sydney Battersby (1887–1974), English swimmer
- Thomas Battersby (cricketer) (1877–1936), English-born cricketer in New Zealand
- Thomas Battersbee (1791–1865), English cricketer
