= Michael Lamont =

New Zealand cricketer (born 1967)

Personal information
- Full name: Michael James Lamont
- Born: 16 January 1967 (age 59); Invercargill, Southland, New Zealand
- Batting: Left-handed
- Role: Batsman
- Relatives: Richard Hoskin (cousin)

Domestic team information
- Years: Team
- 1986/87–1991/92: Southland
- 1990/91–1998/99: Otago
- FC debut: 7 December 1990 Otago v Canterbury
- Last FC: 5 March 1999 Otago v Canterbury
- LA debut: 15 December 1991 Otago v Canterbury
- Last LA: 25 January 1999 Otago v Wellington

Career statistics
Competition	First-class	List A
Matches	33	40
Runs scored	1,202	1,092
Batting average	19.38	30.33
100s/50s	1/5	0/10
Top score	127	88
Balls bowled	179	–
Wickets	2	–
Bowling average	66.00	–
5 wickets in innings	0	–
10 wickets in match	0	–
Best bowling	1/49	–
Catches/stumpings	22/–	9/–
- Source: ESPNcricinfo, 15 May 2016

Michael Lamont (born 16 January 1967) is a New Zealand former cricketer. He played 33 first-class and 40 List A matches, almost all of them for Otago, between the 1990–91 and 1998–99 seasons.

Lamont was born at Invercargill in Southland in 1967. He played age-group cricket for Otago starting in the 1984–85 season made his debut for the provincial Second XI in 1986–87. During the same season he played in three under-19 Test matches and three under-19 One Day Internationals against the Australian under-19 tourists. The following season saw him make his Hawke Cup debut for Southland; Lamont played in several challenge matches for Southland over the following five seasons as Southland retained the trophy. He scored a century during the 1991 defeat of Central Otago as Southland were one of the tournament's dominant teams during the period.

Lamont made his first-class debut in the Otago representative team during the 1990–91 season, playing against Canterbury in a Plunket Shield match at Invercargill. He scored two and eight in his two innings, but retained his place in the team for most of the season, playing in seven of Otago's ten matches during the season. He made his only first-class century during the season, scoring 127 runs against Auckland at Dunedin towards the end of January.

The following season he was ever-present in Otago's first-class team and made his List A debut for the province. He also played in a Hawke Cup representative team team against the touring England Test team, making scores of 29 and 30 in a drawn three-day match at Napier. He continued to play for the provincial team until the end of the 1998–99 season. In his 33 first-class matches Lamont scored a total of 1,202 runs and took two wickets, bowling only very occasionally. In his 40 List A matches he scored 1,092 runs, averaging 30.33 runs per innings for Otago. In his final season for the representative team he scored 71 not out in 143 minutes against Auckland at Eden Park, part of an Otago record 134 run partnership for the second wicket in List A cricket. The record partnership was beaten in 2013–14 when Aaron Redmond and Michael Bracewell scored 155 runs against Wellington.

In club cricket Lamont played for Invercargill Metropolitan. He holds the club record innings batting total, an innings of 201 runs. Lamont's cousin, Richard Hoskin, also played for Otago and Southland between 1977–78 and 1992–93 before going on to play for Central Otago in the Hawke Cup until 1995–96.
