= Greg Dawson (cricketer) =

New Zealand cricketer (born 1989)

Personal information
- Full name: Greg Joseph Dawson
- Born: 6 June 1989 (age 37); Invercargill, New Zealand
- Batting: Left-handed
- Relatives: Garth Dawson (father)

Domestic team information
- Years: Team
- Southland
- 2014/15: Canterbury
- Source: Cricinfo, 15 October 2020

Greg Dawson (born 6 June 1989) is a New Zealand former cricketer. He played in six first-class matches for Canterbury during the 2014–15 season.

Dawson was born at Invercargill in the Southland Region of New Zealand in 1989, the son of Garth Dawson. His father played first-class cricket for Otago and in the Hawke Cup for Southland, and his grandfather Brian Dawon stood as an umpire in first-class cricket in New Zealand. Educated at Southland Boys' High School, Dawson made his Hawke Cup debut for Southland at the age of 16, scoring a century on debut. He was named in a New Zealand under-17 squad.

After playing age-group cricket for Otago between 2004–05 and 2006–07, Dawson took up a scholarship to study at the Canterbury University. He played club cricket for St Albans Cricket Club in Christchurch and played for the Canterbury A side without breaking through into the provincial team until the 2014–15 season. He played in a total of six first-class matches for the side, scoring 239 runs, including two half-centuries.
