= Garth Dawson =

New Zealand cricketer (born 1959)

Personal information
- Full name: Garth James Dawson
- Born: 17 October 1959 (age 67); Invercargill, Southland, New Zealand
- Batting: Left-handed
- Bowling: Right-arm off break
- Role: Batsman
- Relatives: Greg Dawson (son)

Domestic team information
- Years: Team
- 1977/78–2006/07: Southland
- 1980/81–1984/85: Otago
- Source: ESPNcricinfo, 8 May 2016

Garth James Dawson (born 17 October 1959) is a New Zealand former cricketer. He played 36 first-class and 22 List A matches for Otago between the 1980–81 and 1984–85 seasons.

Dawson was born at Invercargill in the Southland Region of New Zealand in 1959 and educated at Southland Boys' High School, the son of Brian Dawson. His father stood as a first-class umpire and Garth played age-group cricket for Otago from the 1976–77 season. He made his Southland debut in the Hawke Cup the following season, going on to play in 20 matches for the team in the competition until the 2006–07 season.

Primarily a batsman, Dawson's senior Otago debut came in January 1981, playing against Auckland in a List A match before making his first-class debut the following day against the same team. Over five seasons he played in more than 50 senior matches for the team, scoring a total of 1,591 runs, including nine half-centuries. He retired from the top-class game in order to focus on work after the 1984–85 season.

Dawson's son, Greg Dawson, played Hawke Cup matches for Southland and age-group cricket for Otago before making six first-class appearances for Canterbury during the 2014–15 season.
