= Colin Nicholson (cricketer) =

New Zealand cricketer (1939–2020)

Ross Nicholson
Personal information
- Full name: Colin Ross Nicholson
- Born: 9 September 1939; Oamaru, North Otago, New Zealand
- Died: 4 February 2020 (aged 80); Waipu, Northland, New Zealand
- Batting: Left-handed
- Bowling: Left-arm fast-medium
- Relatives: Kenneth Nicholson (brother)

Domestic team information
- Years: Team
- 1959/60: Canterbury
- 1963/64: Otago
- Source: ESPNcricinfo, 19 May 2016

Colin Ross Nicholson (9 September 1939 – 4 February 2020) was a New Zealand cricketer. He played one first-class cricket match for Canterbury during the 1959–60 season and one for Otago in the 1963–64 season.

Ross Nicholson was born at Oamaru in North Otago in 1939 and educated at Southland Boys' High School in Invercargill. After playing age-group cricket for Otago and other matches for Southland and a New zealand Brabin XI, he made his first-class debut for Canterbury against Wellington at the Basin Reserve in January 1960. An opening bowler, Nicholson took one wicket on debut. His other first-class match was also against Wellington at the Basin Reserve. Playing for Otago in December 1963 Nicholson went wicketless as Otago lost by an innings.

Nicholson died at Waipu in 2020 aged 80. His older brother Kenneth also played cricket for Otago.
