= Arthur Clowes =

British flying ace of WWII

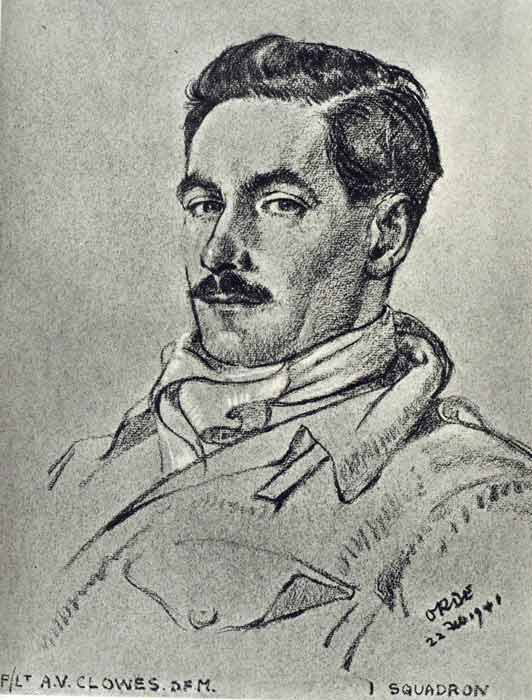
- Portrait of Clowes, made by Cuthbert Orde in February 1941
- Born: 16 August 1912; Sawley, Derbyshire, United Kingdom
- Died: 7 December 1949 (aged 37); Ely, Cambridgeshire, United Kingdom
- Burial place: Brampton, Cambridgeshire, United Kingdom
- Military career
- Allegiance: United Kingdom
- Branch: Royal Air Force
- Service years: 1929–1949
- Rank: Squadron Leader
- Nickname: 'Taffy'
- Unit: No. 1 Squadron
- Commands: No. 94 Squadron; No. 601 Squadron; No. 79 Squadron
- Conflicts: Second World War: Battle of France; Battle of Britain
- Awards: Distinguished Flying Cross; Distinguished Flying Medal; Mention in Despatches

Arthur Clowes, DFC, DFM (16 August 1912 – 7 December 1949) was a British flying ace who served with the Royal Air Force (RAF) during the Second World War. He was credited with having shot down at least ten aircraft.

Born in Sawley, Derbyshire, Clowes joined the RAF in 1929 to train in ground crew duties. Qualifying as a metal rigger two years later, he subsequently trained as a pilot. Serving with No. 1 Squadron as a sergeant pilot at the time of the outbreak of the Second World War, he flew extensively during the Battle of France and the following aerial campaign over southeast England. During this time, he achieved several aerial victories and had been commissioned. After a period of instructing duties in mid-1941, he was given command of No. 79 Squadron. He later commanded fighter squadrons in Egypt and Libya but his operational flying career came to an end in September 1943 when he lost sight in one eye due to an accident. In the postwar period, he remained in the RAF in an administrative role but died of liver cancer in 1949, aged 37.

== Early life ==
Arthur Victor Clowes was born in the Derbyshire town of Sawley on 16 August 1912. His father served in the First World War with the Sherwood Foresters, and was killed in action on 1 July 1917. Clowes, who went to Long Eaton Council Elementary School, joined the Royal Air Force (RAF) in early 1929 for training as ground crew. He qualified as a metal rigger in late 1931. He subsequently volunteered for training as a pilot and once he had gained his wings he was posted to No. 1 Squadron as a sergeant pilot.

At the time of his posting, No. 1 Squadron was based at Tangmere and operated the Hawker Fury fighter. In December 1937, Clowes was involved in a midair collision in December 1937 which saw two other pilots killed. The following year, the squadron began to reequip with the Hawker Hurricane fighter.

== Second World War ==
At the beginning of September 1939, No. 1 Squadron was deployed to France as part of the Advanced Air Striking Force. By October it was operating from Vassincourt Airfield and patrolling the French-German border, occasionally engaging the Luftwaffe. On 23 November Clowes, who was nicknamed 'Taffy' was flying as part of a section of three Hurricanes which pursued a Heinkel He 111 medium bomber to the northeast of Saarbrücken. Immediately after he shot it down, a French Morane fighter collided with his Hurricane, damaging its tail. Clowes safely crash-landed back at the airfield at Vassincourt. While patrolling with his section near Metz on 29 March 1940, a group of Messerschmitt Bf 110 heavy fighters was spotted; Clowes destroyed two while the other two pilots of the section claimed the third. This was the first success over a Bf 110 for RAF pilots and the commander of the RAF forces in France, Air Marshal Arthur Barratt, treated the section to dinner in Paris as a reward. He was promoted to flight sergeant shortly afterwards.

=== Battle of France ===
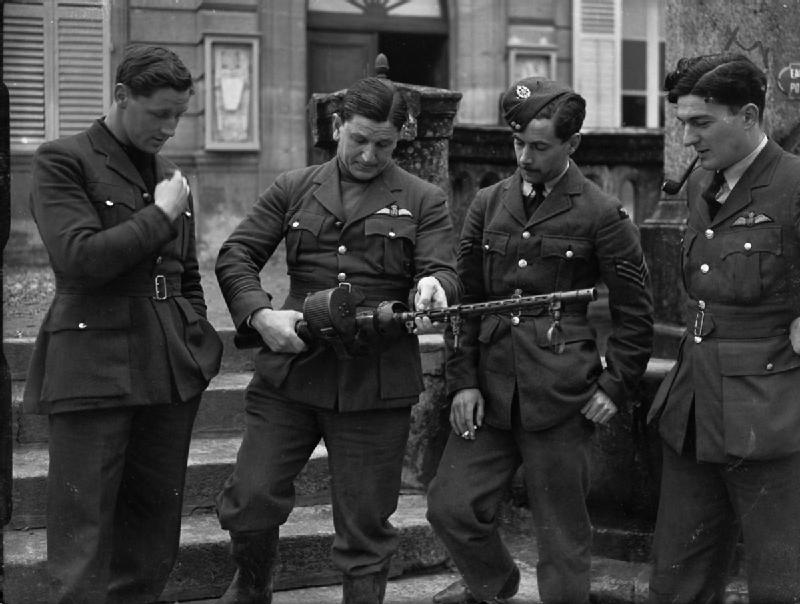
Pilots of No. 1 Squadron inspect a German machine gun outside the officer's mess at their airfield at Vassincourt; Clowes stands on second right

When the German invasion of France commenced on 10 May, No. 1 Squadron was immediately heavily engaged. Clowes was away in England on leave at the time, and did not rejoin his unit until a few days later. Promptly in action, he destroyed a Messerschmitt Bf 109 fighter and a Junkers Ju 87 dive bomber on 14 May. He shared in the destruction of a He 111 near Rouen on 23 May, although this could not be confirmed. Over the following weeks, the squadron began to retreat, repeatedly shifting from airfield to airfield as it moved to the west. On 14 June, Clowes destroyed a Bf 109, by which time, the squadron was operating from Nantes. Later in the month, it was evacuated from France and reassembled at Tangmere. Clowes was mentioned in despatches on 11 July.

=== Battle of Britain ===
No. 1 Squadron, still based at Tangmere but shortly to move to the RAF station at Northolt, resumed operational duties in late July. On 16 August Clowes destroyed two Luftwaffe bombers, a He 111 and Junkers Ju 88 medium bomber respectively, over the South Downs. A few days later, in recognition of his services during the fighting in France, he was awarded the Distinguished Flying Medal. This was gazetted on 20 August and the published citation read:

Sergeant Clowes has displayed courage and determination in many combats against the enemy. He has destroyed at least six enemy aircraft. On 14th June, 1940, he led his section in combat against five Messerschmitt 109's and destroyed one. He then observed, above him, three further enemy aircraft and, before they could attack his flight, he engaged them. He succeeded in damaging one and in causing the other two to disperse in the clouds. He has displayed great skill and power of leadership.

— London Gazette, No. 34927, 20 August 1940

Clowes damaged a Bf 110 and He 111 on 30 August, and the following day probably destroyed two Dornier Do 17 medium bombers near Chelmsford and claimed a Bf 110 shot down near Martlesham as also probably destroyed. On 7 September he shot down a Bf 110 over the Thames estuary. Two days later No. 1 Squadron shifted north to Wittering for a period of rest and recuperation. Shortly afterwards, Clowes was commissioned as a pilot officer. He shared in the shooting down of a Do 17 to the east of Banbury on 24 October. By this time he was one of the squadron's flight commanders.

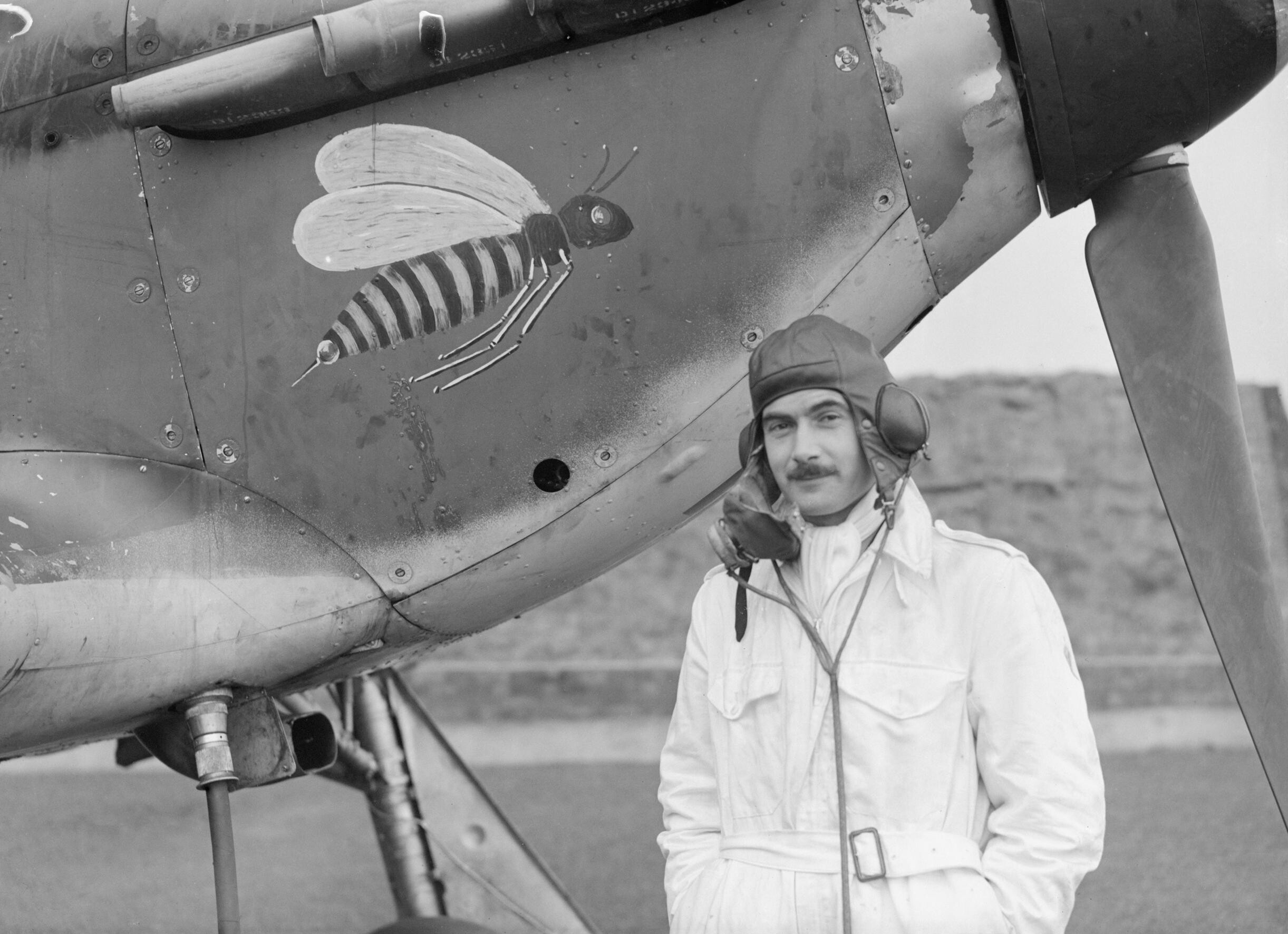
Clowes standing next to his Hurricane, which he had painted with a bee as his personal insignia; the stripes on the abdomen indicated his tally of aerial victories

=== Later war service ===
No. 1 Squadron returned to the south of England at the start of 1941. Operating from Kenley, it carried out bomber escort missions and sorties to France. Clowes was involved with one of the squadron's earliest missions, leading a detachment to strafe German infrastructure near Calais. Promoted to flying officer on 3 February, he was rested two months with a posting to No. 56 Operational Training Unit (OTU) at Heston as an instructor, and then moving to No. 53 OTU to fulfil a similar role there. By this time, he had been awarded the Distinguished Flying Cross. The citation, published in The London Gazette, read:

This officer has displayed great skill in his engagements against the enemy and has destroyed at least 11 of their aircraft. His coolness and judgment on all occasions have been an inspiration to his fellow pilots.

— London Gazette, No. 35161, 13 May 1941

Clowes was promoted to flight lieutenant on 10 December and subsequently appointed to command of No. 79 Squadron as an acting squadron leader. His new unit was based at Baginton, in Coventry, and operated Hurricanes on patrol duties and also occasionally being scrambled to intercept incoming Luftwaffe bombers. The squadron went to the Far East in February 1942, but Clowes was posted at this time to the Middle East. He commanded No. 601 Squadron, based at advanced landing airfields in Egypt and operating Supermarine Spitfire fighters in a ground support role, from August 1942 to March 1943. During the early part of the year, the squadron operated as part of No. 244 Wing in a fighter-bomber role. After attending No. 1 Middle East Training School at El Ballah for a refresher course, in June he assumed command of No. 94 Squadron. This operated a mix of Hurricanes and Spitfires from Luigi di Savoia, in Libya, in sorties to Crete and beyond to the Aegean Sea. His period in command, and his operational flying career, ended in September when he received an injury to one of his eyes, permanently losing his vision in the affected eye.

== Postwar career ==
Clowes was transferred to the secretarial branch of the RAF in September 1945 as a squadron leader. He later attended RAF Staff College at Bracknell. He developed liver cancer and was hospitalised at RAF Hospital Ely, in Ely. He died there on 7 December 1949 and was buried at Brampton.

Clowes is credited with the shooting down of ten aircraft, one of which was shared with other pilots. A share in the destruction of one additional aircraft was unconfirmed. He is also credited with three aircraft probably destroyed and two damaged.
