= Albert Keast =

New Zealand cricketer

Albie Keast
Personal information
- Full name: Albert Victor Ernest Manley Keast
- Born: 2 July 1895; Dunedin, Otago, New Zealand
- Died: 20 April 1969 (aged 73); Christchurch, Canterbury, New Zealand

Domestic team information
- Years: Team
- 1917/18–1922/23: Otago
- 1927/28–1929/30: Southland
- Source: ESPNcricinfo, 15 May 2016

Albert Victor Ernest Manley Keast (2 July 1895 – 20 April 1969) was a New Zealand sportsman and journalist. He played four first-class cricket matches for Otago between the 1917–18 and 1922–23 seasons as well as playing Hawke Cup cricket for Southland.

Born at Dunedin in 1895, Albie Keast was the son of Albert E. A. Keast and his wife Laura Ann. He had two sisters. He played club cricket for Grange and Albion Cricket Clubs, and was described as "well known in local cricket circles" in 1924 and "an important personage in Southland cricket" in 1926.

Keast made his first-class debut for Otago in a December 1917 match against Canterbury at the Hagley Oval in Christchurch. He recorded a pair on debut but was retained in the side for the next representative match, the annual fixture against Southland, a match that had first-class status at the time. He played once the following season, again against Southland, and was recalled to the side for a final time in January 1923, playing in Otago's Plunket Shield side. In total he scored only 23 runs with a highest first-class score of seven.

Professionally Keast worked initially in the commercial department of the Otago Daily Times. He moved to Christchurch in 1924 to work for Whitcombe and Tombs in the city, before moving to Invercargill in 1926, taking up a position as a journalist with the Southland Times. He retained an involvement in cricket as a player and administrator, and played for Southland against the touring Australians in February 1928 and in the team's Hawke Cup side against Manawatu in February 1930.

As a journalist, Keast enjoyed a "national reputation" with an "encyclopaedic knowledge" of sport. He was the sports diarist and rugby union correspondent at the Southland Times writing under the pen name "Onlooker". He played lawn bowls to a high level, representing Southland, and was involved is sports administration, including acting as the manager of a New Zealand bowls side visiting Adelaide in 1951.

Keast died after a long illness at Christchurch in 1969. He was aged 73.
