= Hugh Bannerman =

New Zealand journalist, historian, cricketer and soldier

Personal information
- Full name: James William Hugh Bannerman
- Born: 20 May 1887; Ophir, Otago, New Zealand
- Died: 23 December 1917 (aged 30); Polderhoek Spur, Passchendaele salient, West Flanders, Belgium
- Nickname: Banny
- Batting: Right-handed
- Bowling: Right-arm fast-medium
- Relatives: Wilfred Bannerman (brother); Ronald Bannerman (brother)

Domestic team information
- Years: Team
- 1914/15: Southland

Career statistics
Competition	First-class
Matches	1
Runs scored	11
Batting average	5.50
100s/50s	0/0
Top score	10
Balls bowled	126
Wickets	3
Bowling average	28.00
5 wickets in innings	0
10 wickets in match	0
Best bowling	3/84
Catches/stumpings	0/–
- Source: CricketArchive, 26 September 2016

James William Hugh Bannerman (20 May 1887 – 23 December 1917) was a New Zealand journalist, historian, cricketer and soldier.

== Family and early life ==
Hugh Bannerman was born in the Central Otago town of Ophir in 1887. He was the eldest of three sons of William Bannerman, a banker with the Bank of New Zealand. The next son, Wilfred, played first-class cricket for Otago. The third son, Ronald, was a flying ace in World War I and an air commodore in World War II.

Hugh attended Southland Boys' High School in Invercargill and Otago Boys' High School in Dunedin, where he was an active member of the school cadet corps.

== Career ==
=== Journalism ===
Bannerman worked as a journalist for the Southland Daily News in Invercargill until 1911, when he took over the management of Bluff Publishing and the editorship of its two papers, the Bluff Press and the Stewart Island Gazette. He wrote three books of regional history: two on cricket, one on shipwrecks. He also wrote a history of Southland which was published in the Southland News, and a history of the Southland Agricultural and Pastoral Association which was published in the Southland Times.

=== Cricket ===
Bannerman played non-first-class matches for Otago in 1906–07 and 1907–08. Against Southland in 1907–08, batting at number nine, he scored 59 in 40 minutes with three sixes.

Later in 1908 he moved to Invercargill, where he represented Southland. In the final of the inaugural tournament for the Hawke Cup in 1910–11 he opened Southland's batting and scored 40, then opened the bowling in Rangitikei's first innings with Jack Doig and took 6 for 20 as the pair bowled unchanged throughout the innings. He took 5 for 103 in the second innings for match figures of 55–17–123–11. Ten of his victims were bowled. Southland won, becoming the first holders of the Hawke Cup.

Putting forward his case to be included in the New Zealand team to tour Australia in 1913–14, he described himself to the national selectors thus: "Free batsman with variety of strokes. Good fast bowler with off swerve." Along with Jack Doig and Don Hamilton he was nominated by the Southland Cricket Association for the tour. But they were not playing for one of the four major teams, and they were not selected.

He played one first-class match, which was Southland's second first-class match, against Otago in April 1915. He opened both batting and bowling, and took three wickets in the drawn match.

An obituary notice said enthusiasm was "the keynote of his character": " 'Banny' was an out-and-out cricket enthusiast who would rather play cricket of any sort than eat, and he had the literature of the game and its current history all over the world at his finger-tips."

=== Military ===
At the outbreak of World War I Bannerman took charge of the Bluff cadets. He was commissioned as a lieutenant and posted to the Western Front with the 8th Southland Regiment. He died of "multi-shot" wounds early in the morning of 23 December 1917 in the front line near Polderhoek Chateau, not far from Ypres, while serving with the 2nd Otago Regiment.

He is buried in the Lijssenthoek Military Cemetery in Belgium.

== Personal life ==
Hugh Bannerman married Louise ("Louie") Viva Nichol in St Matthew's Church, Bluff, in February 1913, and the couple settled in Boyne Street, Bluff. They had two children, Lois Burns Bannerman (b. 1914) and William Hugh Bannerman (b. 1915). Lois died in 1919 and is buried in the old Bluff Cemetery. William died in December 1941 while on active service in North Africa as a bombardier with the New Zealand Artillery, 4th Field Regiment.

== Books by Hugh Bannerman ==
- History of Otago Representative Cricket, 1863–1906: With a chapter on the pre-rep period, 1848–1863 (1907)
- Early Cricket in Southland: From 1860 and right up to 1908 (1908)
- Milestones, or, Wrecks of Southern New Zealand (1913)
