= Garfield Charles =

Guyanese cricketer (born 1963)

Personal information
- Full name: Garfield Evan Charles
- Born: 20 October 1963 (age 63); Anna Regina, Essequibo, British Guiana
- Batting: Right-handed
- Bowling: Right-arm fast-medium

Domestic team information
- Years: Team
- 1982 to 1991: Guyana
- 1983 to 1989: Demerara
- Source: Cricinfo, 19 November 2020

Garfield Charles (born 20 October 1963) is a Guyanese cricketer. He played in 34 first-class and 16 List A matches for Guyana and Demerara from 1982 to 1991.

Charles has been a coach since he retired from playing. He has a level 3 New Zealand Cricket coaching qualification along with a Bachelor in Sport Coaching and a Diploma in Sport Psychology. He has coached in Guyana, The Netherlands and in Canterbury, New Zealand, where he is the head coach for the Mid Canterbury Cricket Association in Ashburton.

== See also ==
- List of Guyanese representative cricketers
