= No. 79 Squadron RAF =

Defunct flying squadron of the Royal Air Force

No. 79 (Madras Presidency) Squadron RAF
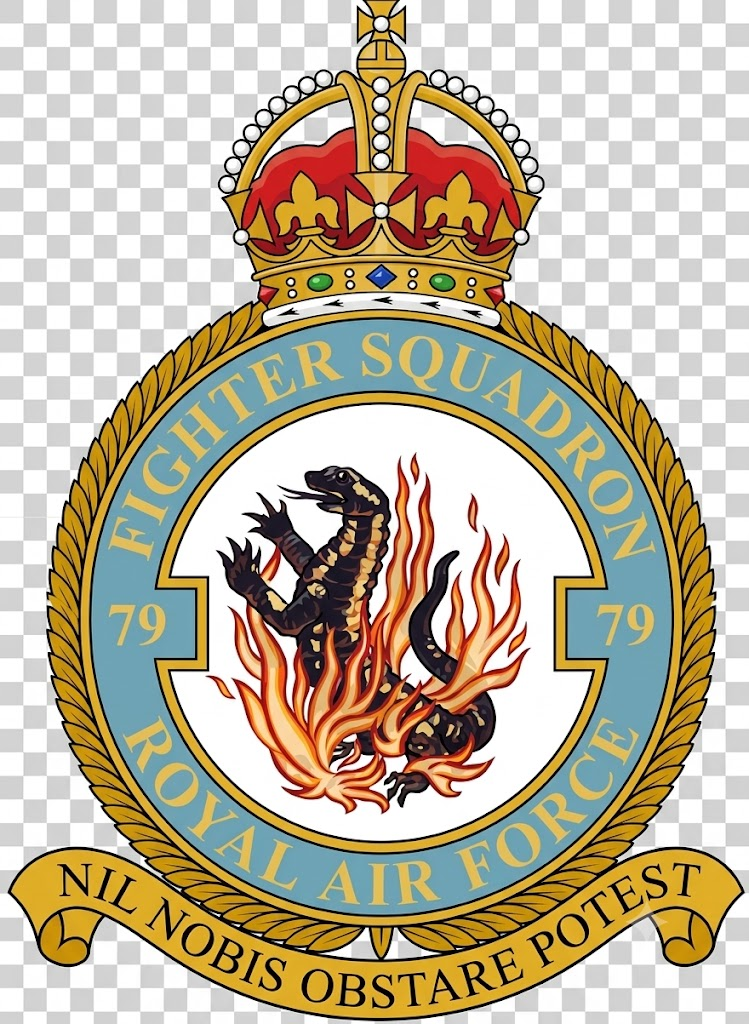
- Squadron badge of No. 79 Squadron
- Active: 1 August 1917 (RFC) – 15 July 1919; 22 March 1937 – 30 December 1945; 15 Nov 1951 – 1 January 1961; 2 Jan 1967 – 31 August 1992
- Country: United Kingdom
- Branch: Royal Air Force
- Role: Training
- Nicknames: Maddy, Maddo
- Mottos: Latin: Nil nobis obstare potest ("Nothing can stand against us")

Commanders
- Notable commanders: CC McMullen (1939–40); Arthur Clowes (1940–41)

Insignia
- Squadron Badge: A salamander salient. The salamander is always ready to face any danger.
- Squadron Codes: AL (Nov 1938 – September 1939); NV (September 1939 – March 1942, 1943 – December 1945); T (November 1951 – 1956)
- Squadron Roundel

No. 79 Squadron was a squadron of the Royal Air Force.

== History ==
=== World War I ===
It was first formed at Gosport on 1 August 1917 as a squadron of the Royal Flying Corps. It was equipped with Sopwith Dolphin fighter aircraft in December that year, moving to France in February 1918. It specialised in low-level ground-attack operations, mainly in support of the British Second Army. Despite its lack of emphasis on air-to-air combat, by the time of the Armistice, the squadron had claimed 64 enemy aircraft and nine kite balloons. Five aces had served in it: Francis W. Gillet, future Air Commodore Ronald Bannerman, Frederic Ives Lord, John McNeaney, and Edgar Taylor.

After the end of the war, it formed part of the British Army of Occupation, before being disbanded at Bickendorf on 15 July 1919.

=== Post World War I through 1942 ===
Frederic Ives Lord with his Sopwith Dolphin in April 1918

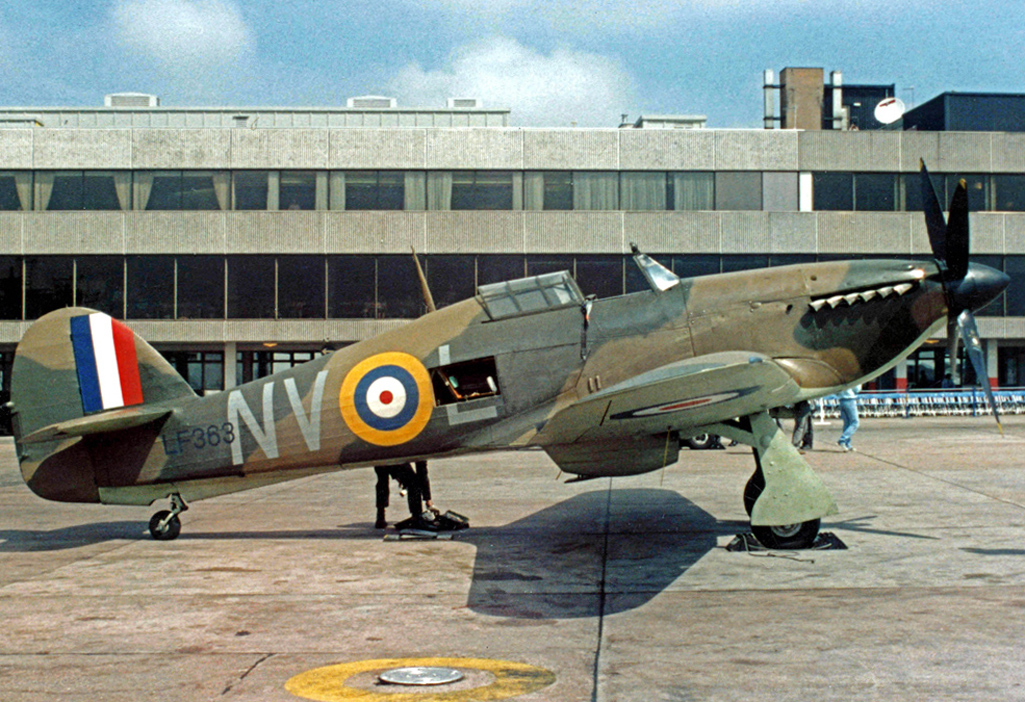
Hawker Hurricane IIC wearing the 'NV' wartime code marks of No.79 Squadron

It was reformed on 22 March 1937 by splitting off "B" Flight of No. 32 Squadron at RAF Biggin Hill, equipped with Gloster Gauntlet biplane fighters. It received more modern Hawker Hurricane fighters in November 1938, retaining these aircraft when the Second World War began. It claimed its first success on 21 November 1939, when it shot down a Dornier Do 17 over the English Channel. As the Battle of France intensified, it was deployed to Merville, operating over France for ten days, claiming 25 German aircraft. During the Battle of Britain the squadron operated from Biggin Hill and RAF Hawkinge in July, being moved to RAF Acklington in Northumberland for a rest before returning to Biggin in August.

=== Far Eastern service ===
In 1942, it was sent to the Far East, arriving in India in May, where the squadron flew primarily ground attack missions, initially with later mark cannon armed Hurricanes. In June 1944 the squadron re-equipped with Republic P-47 Thunderbolt IIs under SEAC command. It disbanded at Meiktila Air Base in Burma on 30 December 1945.

=== Korean War era onwards ===
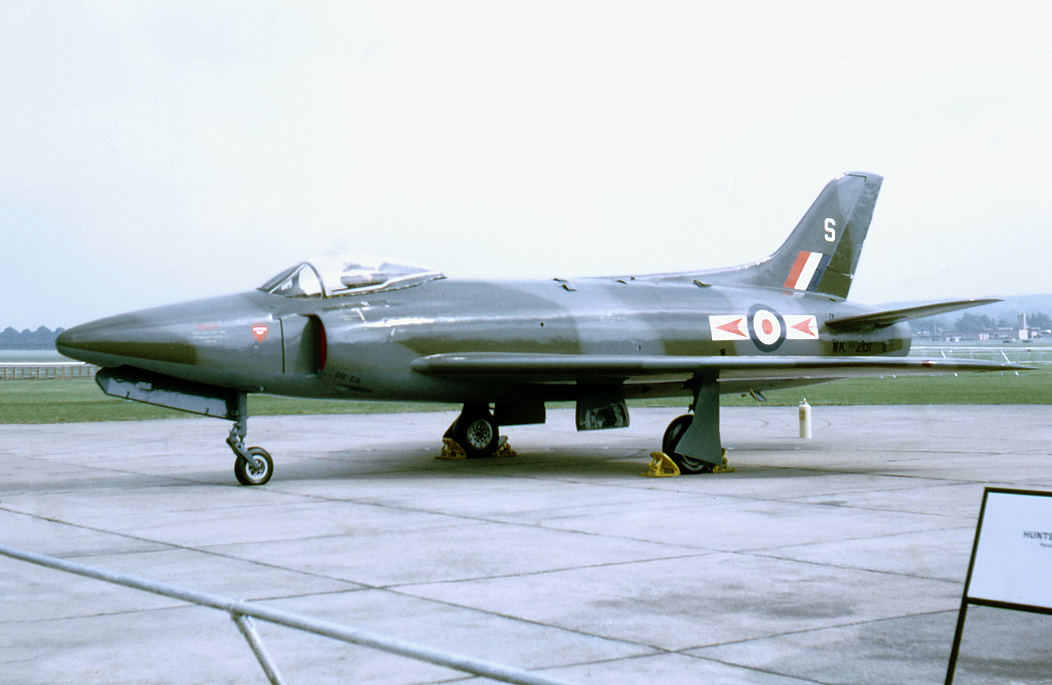
Supermarine Swift FR.5 wearing the red arrow markings of No. 79 Squadron. This aircraft (serial WK281) is now on display at Tangmere Museum

The squadron was reformed again on 15 November 1951 as a fighter-reconnaissance squadron, flying Gloster Meteor FR.9s, based at RAF Wunstorf in West Germany. It was re-equipped with Swift FR.5s in June 1956, being transferred to RAF Gutersloh (approx Sept 1956) due to the proximity of the Russian Zone to RAF Wunstorf. It was renumbered as 4 Squadron on 1 January 1961.

=== Operational training role from 1967 onwards ===
No. 79 Squadron was reformed as part of No. 229 Operational Conversion Unit at RAF Chivenor in North Devon on 2 January 1967, tasked with training pilots to fly the Hawker Hunter until disbanded on 2 September 1974, when it was reformed as one of the component squadrons of No.1 Tactical Weapons Unit, flying first Hunters and then the Hawker Siddeley Hawk T.1 and BAC Jet Provost T4 until finally disbanded at RAF Brawdy on 31 August 1992.

== See also ==
- Jimmy Davies was an ace who was killed whilst flying Hurricanes with No. 79 Squadron, becoming the first American-born airman to be killed in combat in World War II.
- Supermarine Swift serial WK281 is on display at Tangmere Military Aviation Museum in the markings of 79 Squadron.
