= Arthur Poole (cricketer, born 1878) =

English cricketer

Personal information
- Full name: Arthur Valentine Poole
- Born: 28 April 1878; Aston, Warwickshire, England
- Died: 11 April 1955 (aged 76); Invercargill, Southland, New Zealand

Domestic team information
- Years: Team
- 1914/15–1920/21: Southland

Career statistics
| Competition | First-class |
|---|---|
| Matches | 6 |
| Runs scored | 223 |
| Batting average | 20.27 |
| 100s/50s | 0/1 |
| Top score | 77 |
| Balls bowled | 274 |
| Wickets | 7 |
| Bowling average | 21.85 |
| 5 wickets in innings | 0 |
| 10 wickets in match | 0 |
| Best bowling | 4/104 |
| Catches/stumpings | 3/– |
- Source: Cricinfo, 6 April 2017

Arthur Valentine Poole (28 April 1878 – 11 April 1955) was a cricketer who played first-class cricket for Southland from the 1914–15 season until 1920–21.

A middle-order batsman and occasional bowler, Arthur Poole played in six of the eight matches Southland played in their brief period as a first-class team. He made their highest-ever score, 77 in the first innings against Otago in 1914–15, as well as top-scoring with 38 in the second innings. In the first innings he hit two sixes and 11 fours and reached his 50 in 40 minutes. He also top-scored for Southland with 24 in their last first-class match, against the touring Australians in 1920–21.

Poole's matches for Southland in non-first-class cricket extended from the match against Lord Hawke's XI in 1902–03 to the match against the touring Australians in 1927–28 just before he turned 50.

Poole was a timber merchant and managed a sawmilling company. He married Ella Maude Sheppard at St John's Church in Invercargill on 12 November 1902.
