= Richard Hoskin =

New Zealand cricketer

Personal information
- Full name: Richard Neville Hoskin
- Born: 18 October 1959 (age 67); Invercargill, Southland, New Zealand
- Batting: Right-handed
- Bowling: Right-arm leg-spin
- Relatives: Michael Lamont (cousin)

Domestic team information
- Years: Team
- 1977/78–1992/93: Southland
- 1980/81–1992/93: Otago
- 1994/95–1995/96: Central Otago

Career statistics
Competition	First-class	List A
Matches	81	66
Runs scored	3,580	1,285
Batting average	26.91	20.72
100s/50s	6/21	0/5
Top score	157	70
Balls bowled	153	22
Wickets	1	0
Bowling average	109.00	–
5 wickets in innings	0	–
10 wickets in match	0	–
Best bowling	1/105	–
Catches/stumpings	57/–	15/–
- Source: CricketArchive, 6 May 2014

Richard Neville Hoskin (born 18 October 1959) is a former first-class cricketer who played for Otago from 1980 to 1993. Since his retirement from the game he has worked as a sports administrator and businessman.

== Playing career ==
A right-handed batsman who usually batted at number three or four, Hoskin, who was born at Invercargill in 1959, played his first match for Southland in the sub-first-class Hawke Cup in 1977–78. At the age of 19 he was appointed to captain the team in 1978–79.

He made his first-class debut for Otago in 1980–81, and remained a fixture in the side until his retirement after the 1992–93 season. In his fourth match, against Northern Districts, he scored 57 (Otago's top score), and his first century, 117 (out of a team total of 196 for 8).

He toured Zimbabwe with a Young New Zealand team in 1984–85 but played in only one of the four matches. It was his only first-class match for a team other than Otago.

His most successful seasons were 1985–86 and 1987–88, when in each case Otago won the Shell Trophy. In 1985–86 he scored 401 runs at an average of 40.10, with a highest score of 111 off 133 balls against Central Districts when Otago successfully chased 342 for victory in 70 overs. In 1987–88 he made 599 runs at 49.91, including three centuries – 101 against Auckland, 157 against Northern Districts, and 105 against Wellington – to lead Otago's batting aggregates.

He continued to play for Southland in the Hawke Cup, captaining them during their reign as title-holders from 1989 to 1992. He later played a few matches of Hawke Cup cricket for Central Otago, and scored 74 and 162, the two highest scores on either side, when Central Otago beat Taranaki in 1996 to win the title for the first time. When a Hawke Cup "team of the century" was selected to mark the centenary of the competition in 2011, he was one of the 11 players chosen.

== Administrative career ==
Hoskin was a selector for the Otago team from 1997 to 2000 and from 2003 to 2005. He was Chief Executive Officer of the Southland Cricket Association from 2003 to 2007, Commercial Manager of the Otago Cricket Association from 2007 to 2009, and CEO of Sport Southland from 2009 to 2013.

== Personal life ==
Hoskin lives in Arrowtown, Otago, with his wife Sally. He managed an English-language school in Queenstown, and he and Sally now run Arrowtown Lodge. He also works for the New Zealand sports marketing agency The Clubhouse. His daughter Laura Hoskin is a professional golfer. His cousin, Michael Lamont, also played for Southland and Otago.
