= Thomas Battersby (cricketer) =

New Zealand cricketer (1877–1936)

Personal information
- Born: 11 January 1877; Ashton-in-Makerfield, Lancashire, England
- Died: 16 December 1936 (aged 59); Invercargill, Southland, New Zealand
- Role: Batsman

Domestic team information
- Years: Team
- 1912/13–1921/22: Southland

Career statistics
Competition	First-class
Matches	2
Runs scored	8
Batting average	2.00
100s/50s	0/0
Top score	4
Balls bowled	56
Wickets	0
Bowling average	–
5 wickets in innings	–
10 wickets in match	–
Best bowling	–
Catches/stumpings	1/–
- Source: CricketArchive, 7 March 2024

Thomas Battersby (11 January 1877 – 16 December 1936) was an English-born cricketer. He played two first-class matches in New Zealand for Southland, one in each of the 1914–15 and 1918–19 seasons.

Professionally Battersby worked as a noted groundsman and caretaker in Invercargill, and was responsible for the development of the cricket pitch at the city's Rugby Park ground to first-class standard. He served in the New Zealand Army during World War I and was involved in sports clubs in Invercargill until his death in 1936.

== Sporting life ==
Battersby was born at Ashton-in-Makerfield in Lancashire in 1877. By 1912 he had emigrated to Invercargill in the Southland Region of New Zealand where he was employed as the groundsman and caretaker of the Rugby Park sports ground in the city. A clay cricket pitch was first established at the ground in 1910 and the first cricket played on the ground in 1911. (Note: Rugby Park was opened in 1908 as a rugby union stadium. Prior to the ground being opened representative Southland matches were played at the Eastern Reserve and Queens Park grounds in Invercargill. The Southland Cricket Association later moved to use the Queens Park ground and cricket was last played at Rugby Park in the 1950s. The stadium is still used for rugby.) Battersby was responsible for the development of the grass wicket on the ground, bringing it up to first-class standard. (Note: All five of Southland's home first-class fixtures were played on the Rugby Park ground.)

By November 1912 Battersby, who according to The Southland Times was making "his first public appearance in Southland", was playing cricket in Invercargill for Appleby Cricket Club. He played club cricket regularly and was a strong club player―in January 1913 The Southland Times wrote that "since his entry into local games he has proved himself a consistent run getter", although it was of the view that "there is nothing attractive in his mode of making runs, but he is solid, and can deal with bowling where many another batsman falls." He was later a member of the club's committee, served as captain, treasurer and, in the 1930s, was the club's president. He represented the club on the Southland Cricket Association and was one of the selectors for Southland representative matches.

Developing a reputation as a batsman for whom the "consistency of his totals ... makes him valuable", the Invercargill press considered him worthy of consideration for the Southland representative team by January 1913, and he played his first representative match in March, a non-first-class fixture against Otago at Rugby Park. Although his batting was disappointing, he was, according to The Southland Times, "well worth his place" and had "justified his inclusion by his clever fielding". The following season he played in a trial match for the "Probables" Southland side, but was only included in the side as an "emergency" replacement player, and in the event did not play in any of Southland's representative matches during 1913–14.

The following season Battersby was again selected as an "emergency" for the representative side, but with three players having to drop out of the Southland team to face Otago he played in the match―the first of Southland's eight first-class matches. Against a strong Otago side, Southland fared badly and were dismissed in both of their innings for fewer than 100 runs, Battersby making scores of two and one in his innings. Battersby played further representative matches for Southland, playing against Otago in 1918–19 and 1919–20, and Ashburton County in 1921–22.

He continued to play club cricket for Appleby, and was described in late 1921 as having "always been a force to be reckoned with in the southern club’s eleven, while the value of the work he has done year after year for his club, has perhaps not yet been fully appreciated. In difficult periods, Battersby has been the life and soul of his club, while the work he has done in bringing on the younger players is deserving of the highest praise". As well as coaching at Appleby he also assisted with the coaching of cricket at Southland Boys' High School in Invercargill. Although he announced that he was "giving up the game" ahead of the 1922–23 season, he continued to play occasional matches when required.

== Professional life ==
As a groundsman Battersby quickly made a good impression. His work preparing pitches was noted by October 1912, with The Southland Times saying that the "turf wickets at the Park will lie in a condition far ahead of anything experienced on the occasion of opening games in past seasons". In December the same paper reported that cricketers "were loud in their praise of the condition of the wickets at the Park since caretaker Battersby has applied his knowledge to that area" and in January 1913 the paper was clear that he "knows more than the correct manner of preparing turf wickets" then anyone else in the city.

By September 1913 the Southland Cricket Association was praising Battersby's work preparing cricket pitches at Rugby Park. Its annual report said the he "continues his excellent service" and that "his skill being evident in the quality of the pitches provided for club and other matches". Despite conditions in Invercargill where wet weather was commonplace, especially during the early months of the cricket season, The Southland Times praised the preparation of the Rugby Park pitch for an inter-provincial match against Wellington in January 1914, saying that the wicket was a "splendid testimony to the capabilities of Caretaker Battersby" and that he had prepared a pitch "on which the batsmen should have made lots of runs".

Ahead of the match against Canterbury the following month the paper again called his pitch preparation "splendid" and praised the "billiard-like surface" in the outfield, while The Southern Cross reported that "the wicket is in fine order, thanks to the care of Mr Battersby, who is a real live custodian and enthusiastic cricketer". In the event, rain meant that play was only possible for three hours on the first day of the match, but The Southland Times reported that Battersby, who it said "had laboured hard to provide an excellent wicket ... had succeeded" in producing a pitch that "played so well during the three hours that batsmen and bowlers were defying each other and its surface was in itself an excellent testimony to the qualifications of the caretaker to work up a wicket of standard".

== Military service ==
In July 1916 Battersby resigned his position as caretaker at Rugby Park in order to enlist in the New Zealand Army, being granted a leave of absence to do so. He enlisted in the 19th reinforcements, leaving New Zealand in November 1916 and arriving in England in January 1917.

After a time spend at the New Zealand Depot at Codford in Wiltshire, Battersby was posted to France in May 1917 and spent five months on the Western Front on active service. He was wounded in the hand and thigh, the thigh wound considered serious, in October and invalided out of the front line to a field hospital at Étaples. In January 1918 he returned to England to recuperate due to his wounds but in March was found unfit for duty due to the stress of active service and returned to New Zealand where he was discharged in June 1918.

== Later life ==
Following his return from the war, Battersby was employed as a caretaker by the Southland Agricultural and Pastoral Association. He continued to be associated with Appleby Cricket Club throughout the 1920s and played lawn bowls.

Battersby died at his home in Invercargill in 1936 at the age of 59. He left a wife and son.
