= Henry Holderness =

New Zealand cricketer (1889–1974)

Personal information
- Full name: Henry Victor Angel Holderness
- Born: 28 May 1889; Dunedin, Otago, New Zealand
- Died: 17 July 1974 (aged 85); Dunedin, Otago, New Zealand

Domestic team information
- Years: Team
- 1918/19: Otago
- Only FC: 18 March 1919 Otago v Southland
- Source: CricketArchive, 28 February 2024

Henry Victor Angel Holderness (24 May 1889 – 17 July 1974), often known as Victor Holderness, was a New Zealand cricketer. He played a single first-class match for Otago during the 1918–19 season.

Holderness was born at Dunedin in 1889 and lived in the Mornington area of the city. He attended High Street School and played club cricket and association football for Mornington clubs, as well as rugby union for the Zingari club in the Dunedin. During World War I he served as a field artillery gunner in the New Zealand Expeditionary Force. He was wounded in the left leg 1915 whilst serving at Gallipoli. He was promoted to the rank of Bombardier and later served on the Western Front in France.

A well known club cricketer who was considered "a really good bowler", Holderness won a junior representative cap for Otago before the war, but made his only senior representative appearance against Southland in March 1919. Opening the bowling for Otago, he took five-wicket hauls in both Southland innings, five wickets for 10 runs and five for 29, as he and Arthur Alloo bowled unchanged through the match to dismiss Southland for 41 and 55.

Holderness died at Dunedin in 1974 at the age of 85. His wife Emily died in 1979 at the age of 81.
