= John Harry McNeaney =

Canadian World War I flying ace

John Harry McNeaney alias John Henry McNeaney
- Born: 30 May 1897; Jarvis, Ontario, Canada
- Died: 1 March 1919 (aged 21); England
- Burial place: London, England
- Military career
- Allegiance: Canada; United Kingdom
- Branch: Royal Flying Corps
- Rank: Captain
- Unit: No. 79 Squadron RFC/No. 79 Squadron RAF
- Awards: Distinguished Flying Cross (United Kingdom)

John Harry McNeaney (30 May 1897 – 1 March 1919) was a Canadian First World War flying ace, flying with both the Royal Flying Corps and the Royal Air Force. He was credited with five aerial victories. John McNeaney was the only Canadian Sopwith Dolphin Ace.

== Personal life ==
John McNeaney was born on 30 May 1897, the son of John and Mary Elizabeth McNeaney. He married Bertha Emma McNeaney (née Jones), when he was 17. His christened middle name was Henry, but he signed his marriage certificate Harry, and always used that name. They may have lived at 178, West Second St., Upper Hamilton, Ontario, Canada. He also gave an address of 237 Charlton Avenue West. McNeaney had a successful career as a competent commercial artist before he joined the Royal Flying Corps on 5 May 1917.

== History ==
Commissioned in August 1917, he flew with No. 79 Squadron RAF, flying the Sopwith Dolphin and successfully claimed four German Fokker D.VIIs and a Halberstadt C destroyed. He was awarded the Distinguished Flying Cross after he and two others engaged about ten Fokker D.VIIs near Paschendale in Belgium on 28 September 1918. Four Fokkers were claimed destroyed, two accounted for by McNeaney. McNeaney was wounded in June 1918 while on a trench strafing sortie.

After cessation of hostilities, John was posted to Germany as part of the forces of occupation. He contracted influenza and was brought back to England. He died on 1 March 1919 and was buried at Fulham Old Cemetery in West London, just south of Hammersmith Bridge. His grave has been marked by the Commonwealth War Graves Commission, which has erected a headstone.

== Honors and awards ==
Distinguished Flying Cross (DFC)

Lieut. (A./Capt.) John Harry McNeaney. (FRANCE)

An airman who has accounted for five enemy aeroplanes. On 28 September, in company with two other machines, he engaged about ten Fokkers; four of these were destroyed, two by Lieut. McNeaney.
