= Albert Alloo =

New Zealand cricketer (1893–1955)

Personal information
- Full name: Albert Peacock Alloo
- Born: 26 October 1893; Sydney, New South Wales, Australia
- Died: 21 July 1955 (aged 61); Dunedin, Otago, New Zealand
- Batting: Left-handed
- Bowling: Slow left-arm orthodox
- Relatives: Cecil Alloo (brother); Arthur Alloo (brother)

Domestic team information
- Years: Team
- 1914/15: Otago
- Only FC: 1 January 1915 Otago v Wellington

Career statistics
Competition	First-class
Matches	1
Runs scored	4
Batting average	2.00
100s/50s	0/0
Top score	4
Balls bowled	120
Wickets	0
Bowling average	–
5 wickets in innings	–
10 wickets in match	–
Best bowling	–
Catches/stumpings	0/–
- Source: CricketArchive, 13 October 2011

Albert Peacock Alloo (26 October 1893 – 21 July 1955) was a New Zealand cricketer and lawyer. He was a left-handed batsman and left-arm slow bowler who played in a single first-class match for Otago in the 1914–15 season.

Alloo was born in Sydney in Australia and moved to Otago with his family when he was a boy. He attended Otago Boys' High School.

Alloo made a single first-class appearance, during the 1914–15 season, against Wellington. Batting in the lower order in the first innings, he scored 4 runs, but, when Wellington forced the follow-on, Alloo moved further up the order, where he scored a duck. Alloo bowled 20 overs in the match, conceding 91 runs.

His brothers Cecil and Arthur were also first-class cricketers. The brothers were the grandsons of John Alloo, a Chinese-born businessman on the Ballarat goldfields, and his wife, née Margaret Peacock, who had come out from Scotland. John and Margaret moved to the Otago goldfields in 1868, where he was employed by the Otago Police Force as a constable-interpreter.

Albert Alloo served overseas with the New Zealand Expeditionary Force in the First World War. He was admitted to the Bar in 1927 and practised law in Dunedin. The firm he founded continues to operate in Dunedin as Albert Alloo & Sons; as of 2023 two of his grandsons are the partners.

He died in July 1955 aged 61, leaving a widow and two sons.
