= Thomas Howard (Australian cricketer) =

Australian cricketer

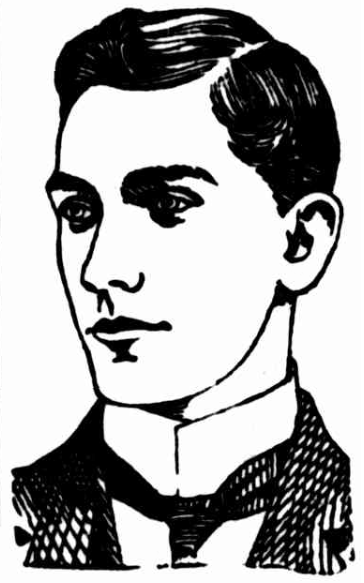

Personal information
- Born: 2 May 1877; Sydney, Australia
- Died: 6 October 1965 (aged 88); Sydney, Australia
- Source: ESPNcricinfo, 1 January 2017

Thomas Howard (2 May 1877 – 6 October 1965) was an Australian cricketer. He played seven first-class matches for New South Wales between 1899/1900 and 1902/03. He also managed the Australian team that toured New Zealand in 1920-21.

== See also ==
- List of New South Wales representative cricketers
