= Ted Forssberg =

Australian cricketer

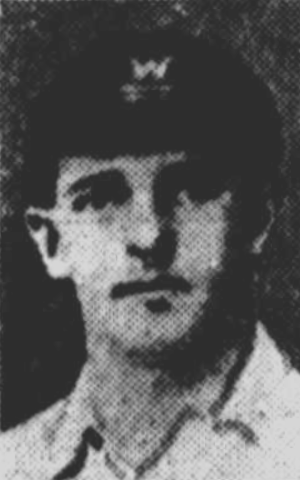

Personal information
- Full name: Edward Ernest Brackley Forssberg
- Born: 10 December 1895; Sydney, Australia
- Died: 23 May 1953 (aged 57); Sydney, Australia
- Source: ESPNcricinfo, 28 December 2016

Ted Forssberg (10 December 1895 – 23 May 1953) was an Australian cricketer. He played eight first-class matches for New South Wales between 1920/21 and 1921/22.

== See also ==
- List of New South Wales representative cricketers
