= Arthur Alloo =

New Zealand cricketer (1892–1950)

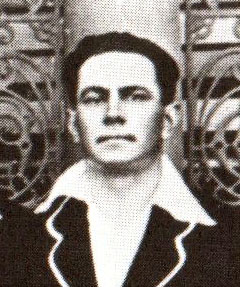
- Alloo in 1925/26

Personal information
- Full name: Arthur William Alloo
- Born: 9 January 1892; Sydney, New South Wales, Australia
- Died: 16 September 1950 (aged 58); Nelson, New Zealand
- Batting: Right-handed
- Bowling: Right-arm off-spin
- Relatives: Albert Alloo (brother); Cecil Alloo (brother)

Domestic team information
- Years: Team
- 1913/14–1930/31: Otago

Career statistics
Competition	First-class
Matches	51
Runs scored	2,043
Batting average	23.21
100s/50s	2/11
Top score	101
Balls bowled	8,454
Wickets	131
Bowling average	27.59
5 wickets in innings	10
10 wickets in match	3
Best bowling	6/20
Catches/stumpings	24/–
- Source: CricketArchive, 30 April 2014

Arthur William Alloo (9 January 1892 – 16 September 1950) played first-class cricket in New Zealand from 1913 to 1931, and represented New Zealand in the years before New Zealand played Test cricket. He worked as a schoolteacher.

== Cricket career ==
=== Early career ===
Alloo made his first-class debut as an opening batsman for Otago in the 1913–14 season. In his second match he made 101 against Wellington in three hours out of a team total of 236.

He bowled little until 1918–19, when in a match against Southland he and Henry Holderness bowled unchanged throughout the match, Alloo taking 5 for 27 and 5 for 23. In his next match, in 1919–20, also against Southland, he took 6 for 20 in the second innings. A few days later, against Wellington, he scored 35 and 26 batting at number four, and bowled unchanged throughout the match, taking 6 for 63 and 4 for 96. According to Dick Brittenden, Alloo "dropped the ball on a length at slow-medium pace, and turned it from off".

=== Playing for New Zealand ===
In 1923–24, Alloo was the leading wicket-taker in the Plunket Shield, with 24 wickets at an average of 25.25. In the final match against Wellington at Carisbrook, 1905 runs were scored over five days – which is still the seventh-highest aggregate in the history of first-class cricket. Wellington batted first and made 560 (Alloo 6 for 136), Otago replied with 385, Wellington made 465 in their second innings (Alloo 6 for 141), and Otago, needing 641 to win, were dismissed for 495. He played a match for New Zealand against the touring New South Wales team at the end of the season.

Alloo also played for New Zealand in 1924–25, this time two matches against Victoria. He toured Australia with the New Zealand team in 1925–26, playing all four matches against the state sides, but with little success. In all, in seven matches for New Zealand against Australian state teams he made 177 runs at 19.66, and took six wickets at 55.00.

=== Later career ===
Alloo captained Otago from 1927–28 until his final matches in 1930–31, usually batting at seven or eight. He scored his second first-class century in 1928–29, batting at number eight against Wellington.

== Personal life ==
Alloo attended Otago Boys' High School and the University of Otago. Like him, his brothers Albert and Cecil also played for Otago. The brothers were the grandsons of John Alloo, a Chinese-born businessman on the Ballarat goldfields, and his wife, née Margaret Peacock, who had come out from Scotland. John and Margaret moved to the Otago goldfields in 1868, where he was employed by the Otago Police Force as a constable-interpreter.

Arthur Alloo was a schoolteacher. He married another teacher, Eileen Jessie Williams, in Dunedin in December 1930. He was appointed headmaster of the North-East Harbour School in Dunedin in 1932 and in the late 1930s he became the headmaster of Auckland Point School in the Nelson area, and later the headmaster of Nelson Central School.

As well as cricket, Alloo played soccer, fives, billiards, bowls and golf. He died suddenly in September 1950 while playing golf in Nelson. He was 58. His wife predeceased him.
