= Francis Warrington Gillet =

American flying ace

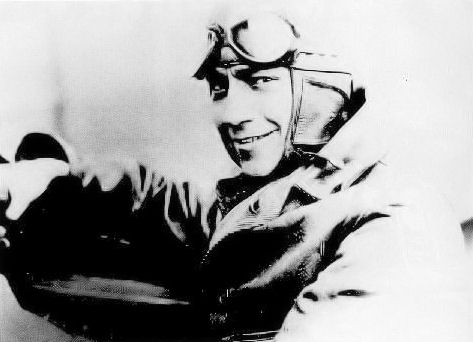
- Francis Warrington Gillet, 1918
- Born: 28 November 1895; Baltimore, Maryland
- Died: 21 December 1969 (aged 74); Baltimore, Maryland
- Military career
- Allegiance: United States; United Kingdom
- Branch: United States Army; British Army; Royal Air Force
- Service years: 1917–1919
- Rank: Captain
- Nickname: "Razors"
- Units: Aeronautical Division, U.S. Signal Corps; No. 79 Squadron RFC/RAF
- Conflicts: World War I
- Awards: Distinguished Flying Cross & Bar; Croix de Guerre (Belgium)
- Other work: Returned to service during World War II

Francis Warrington Gillet DFC* (28 November 1895 – 21 December 1969) was an American flying ace who served in both the American and British armed forces as a pilot during World War I. With 20 credited aerial victories he was the highest scoring pilot flying the Sopwith Dolphin, and the second highest scoring American, only surpassed by Eddie Rickenbacker.

== Biography ==
Gillet was born in Baltimore, Maryland. He graduated from the University of Virginia, before joining the Aeronautical Division of the U.S. Signal Corps as a cadet in April 1917. On 31 May 1917 he entered the School of Military Aeronautics at the University of Illinois for preliminary flight training, but obtained an honourable discharge on the grounds of dependency on 25 July 1917.

He enlisted in the Royal Flying Corps Canada using the name Frederick Warrington Gillet (though British sources most often render his surname as Gillett) to avoid any complications with 8 U.S. Code § 1481 which would result in him forfeiting his American citizenship on enlisting in the armed forces of a foreign power. After completing his basic flight training, on 29 December 1917 he received Royal Aero Club Aviator's Certificate No. 7017, and was commissioned as a second lieutenant the same day. In England, after receiving advanced training as a fighter pilot, he was assigned to No. 79 Squadron RFC in France on 29 March 1918. Within days, on 1 April 1918, the Army's Royal Flying Corps (RFC) and the Royal Naval Air Service (RNAS) were merged to form the Royal Air Force.

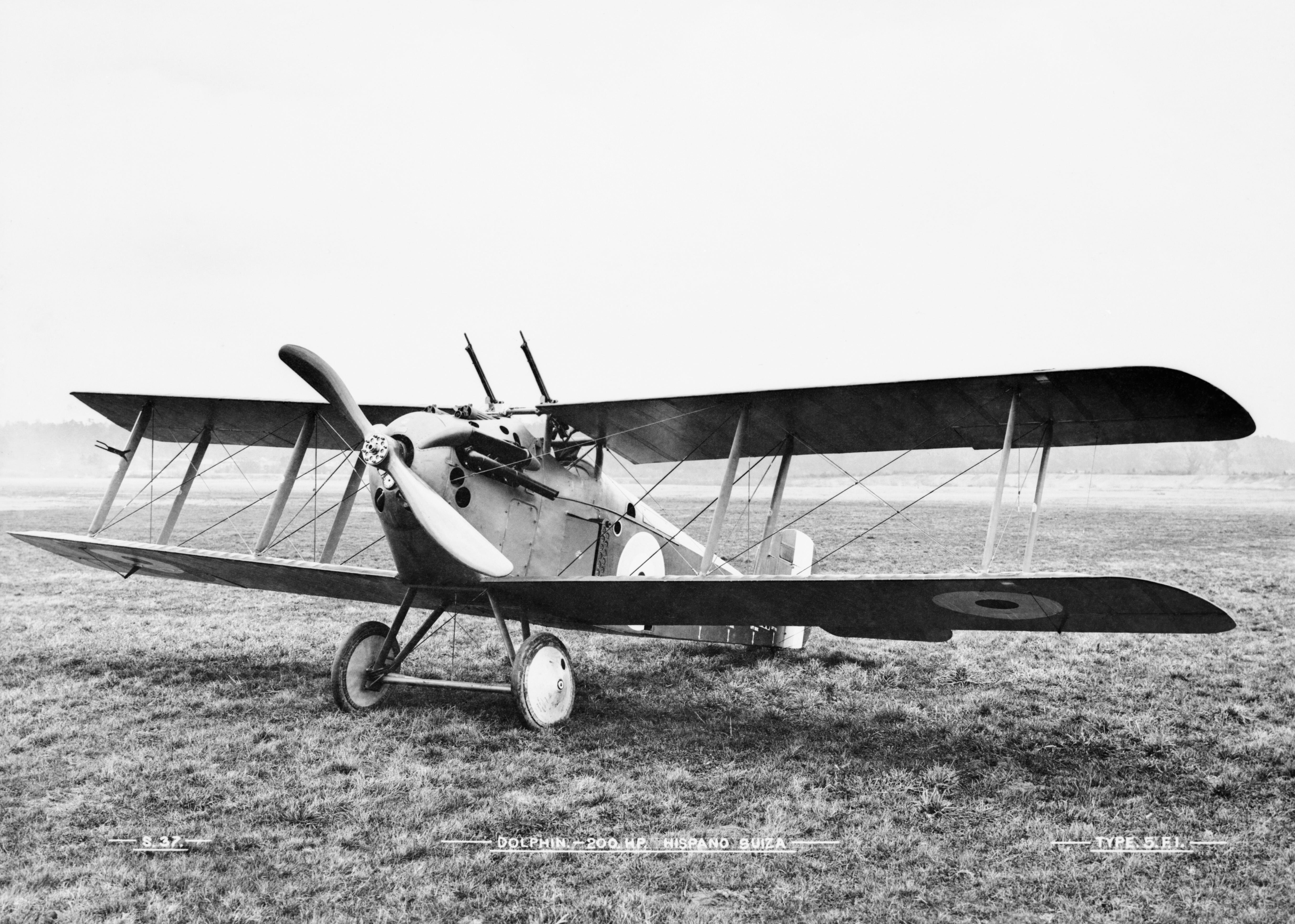
Sopwith Dolphin

No. 79 Squadron was flying the Sopwith Dolphin, an unusual biplane distinguished by its "negative stagger" wing arrangement, a type Gillet had not flown before. After becoming acclimated to the Dolphin and honing his combat skills, he scored his first victory on 3 August, destroying a kite balloon north of Estaires. He accounted for two aircraft towards the end of the month, then another balloon and six more aircraft in September, a balloon and five aircraft in October, and four aircraft in November, three of them early on the morning of the 10th, the day before the armistice. All were assessed as destroyed, which was extremely unusual, as most aces had numerous "out of control" credits.

He was appointed acting-captain on 14 October 1918, and served for a short time as the commanding officer of his squadron. His decorations include two awards of the British Distinguished Flying Cross, and the Belgian Croix de Guerre.

After the war, Gillet left the RAF, being transferred to the unemployed list on 7 March 1919. He returned to the United States and obtained his release from the U.S. Army Signal Reserve Corps and entered the family business. Gillet pursued a successful, lengthy business career as a liquor importer, realtor, and banker, and died at the age of 74 on 21 December 1969 at the Greater Baltimore Medical Center.

== Honours and awards ==
Distinguished Flying Cross
Lieutenant Frederick Warrington Gillett.

When attacking a kite balloon, a two-seater guarding it advanced to engage him; Lieut. Gillett shot the machine down, and, turning to the balloon, which was being rapidly hauled down, he dropped two bombs at the winch and fired a drum into the balloon, which deflated but did not catch fire. In addition to this two-seater, this officer has accounted for two other machines and a kite balloon.

Bar to the Distinguished Flying Cross
Lieutenant (Acting-Captain) Frederick Warrington Gillett, DFC

A pilot of great dash and skill who, since 3 August, has destroyed twelve hostile aircraft. On 29 September, when on low-line patrol, he attacked three Fokkers, driving down one, which fell in flames.

Gillet also received the Croix de Guerre from Belgium in July 1919.

== See also ==
- List of World War I flying aces from the United States
