= Australian cricket team in New Zealand in 1920–21 =

International cricket tour

An Australian cricket team toured New Zealand from February to April 1921 to play nine first-class matches including two against New Zealand. The Australians also played the main provincial teams.

== The touring team ==
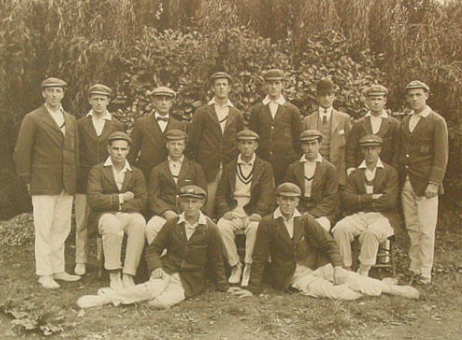
The Australian team

The Australian team, with ages at the start of the tour, was:

- Vernon Ransford (captain, 35)
- Oswald Asher (29)
- James Bogle (28)
- Ted Forssberg (25)
- Percy Hornibrook (21)
- Bert Ironmonger (38)
- Alan Kippax (23)
- Allie Lampard (35)
- Arthur Liddicut (29)
- Lance Pellew (21)
- Andrew Ratcliffe (29)
- Vic Richardson (26)
- Gar Waddy (42)

The manager was Tom Howard of New South Wales.

As the Test series against England was still in progress when the tour began, the team for New Zealand was virtually an Australian second eleven. None of the players had taken part in the Test series. The only player with Test experience was Ransford, who played 20 Tests before World War I. John Ellis, Hunter Hendry, Johnny Moyes, Arthur Richardson, Donald Steele (named as captain) and Carl Willis were selected but were unavailable. They were replaced by Bogle, Forssberg, Hornibrook, Kippax and Waddy.

== The tour ==
The Australians arrived in Wellington on the SS Manuka on 7 February. They were given a civic reception on 8 February at the Town Hall, with speeches of welcome from the mayor, John Luke, and Sir Francis Bell, president of the Wellington Cricket Association.

First-class matches are indicated in bold.

- **Wellington v Australians**, Basin Reserve, Wellington, 11, 12, 14 February 1921. Wellington 218 and 158; Australians 293 and 86 for 2; Australians won by 8 wickets.
- Manawatu v Australians, Sportsground, Palmerston North, 15, 16 February 1921. Manawatu 172 and 69; Australians 314. Australians won by an innings and 73 runs.
- **Auckland v Australians**, Eden Park, Auckland, 18, 19 February 1921. Auckland 120 and 148; Australians 285. Australians won by an innings and 17 runs.
- Waikato v Australians, Seddon Park, Hamilton, 22, 23 February 1921. Waikato XV 173 and 49; Australians 318 for 8 declared. Australians won by an innings and 96 runs.
- **Hawke's Bay v Australians**, Nelson Park, Napier, 25, 26 February 1921. Hawke's Bay 167 and 135 for 6; Australians 405. Drawn.

This was one of two scheduled two-day first-class matches in the tour. It was the last first-class match for Hawke's Bay, who played 53 first-class matches between 1884 and 1921. Their top scorer in each innings was Bob Bishop, who made 61 and 60. Ransford made 158, "retired out".

- Wairarapa v Australians, Park Oval, Masterton, 1, 2 March 1921. Wairarapa XV 81 and 217; Australians 293 and 8 for 0. Australians won by 10 wickets.
- Wanganui v Australians, Cook’s Gardens, Wanganui, 4, 5 March 1921. Australians 286; Wanganui XII 68 and 185. Australians won by an innings and 33 runs.
- **New Zealand Minor Associations v Australians**, Basin Reserve, Wellington, 8, 9 March 1921. Australians 271; New Zealand Minor Associations 124 and 141. Australians won by an innings and 6 runs.

The match was scheduled for three days but completed in two. This match was the only first-class match ever played by the Minor Associations, and for six of their team it was their only first-class match. They included the Rev. Tasman Drake, an Anglican minister who was serving in Gisborne at the time.

- **Canterbury v Australians**, Lancaster Park, Christchurch, 11, 12, 14 March 1921. Canterbury 311 and 102; Australians 356 and 60 for 3. Australians won by seven wickets.
- **Southland v Australians**, Rugby Park, Invercargill, 16, 17 March 1921. Southland 122; Australians 195. Drawn.

Rain prevented play on the second day. This was a two-day first-class match, and the last of the eight first-class matches Southland played between 1915 and 1921.

- **Otago v Australians**, Carisbrook, Dunedin, 18, 19, 21 March 1921. Otago 127 and 88; Australians 226. Australians won by an innings and 11 runs.

Bogle was the match top-scorer with 69. Ironmonger took 6 for 34 in the second innings. For Otago, Dick Torrance took 5 for 68.

- Ashburton County v Australians, Ashburton Domain, Ashburton, 23, 24 March 1921. Ashburton County XV 183 and 150; Australians 300 for 8 declared and 34 for no wicket. Australians won by 10 wickets.
- **New Zealand v Australia**, Basin Reserve, Wellington, 26, 28, 29 March 1921. Australia 273 and 147 for 4 declared; New Zealand 204 and 106 for 4. Drawn.

Most of the first day was lost to rain. Liddicut top-scored in each innings for Australia with 83 and 49 not out. The New Zealand captain Stan Brice took 7 for 80 in the first innings. The gate takings of 925 pounds were a record for a match in New Zealand.

- **New Zealand v Australia**, Eden Park, Auckland, 1, 2, 4 April 1921. Australia 663; New Zealand 259 and 177. Australians won by an innings and 227 runs.

The Australians made their runs off 108 eight-ball overs in 430 minutes. Richardson made 112, Lampard 132, and Ransford 128. Lampard also took seven wickets and Ironmonger nine. Sydney Smith was New Zealand's top scorer with 89 in the first innings.

- Rotorua v Australians, Government Gardens, Rotorua, 6 April 1921. Rotorua XV 250; Australians 314. Australians won on the first innings.

During a week of sightseeing and recreation in the central hot springs region of the North Island, the Australians also won a light-hearted one-day match against a team of locals in Taupō on 9 April, for which no scores are available. They left Auckland for Sydney on the SS Maheno on 14 April.

== Assessments ==
The tour was financially successful, leaving the New Zealand Cricket Council with a surplus of £1000.
