= Andrew Ratcliffe (cricketer) =

Australian cricketer

Personal information
- Full name: Andrew Thomas Ratcliffe
- Born: 3 May 1891; Sydney, Australia
- Died: 31 August 1974 (aged 83); Sydney, Australia
- Batting: Left-handed
- Role: Wicketkeeper-batsman

Domestic team information
- Years: Team
- 1913/14 to 1928/29: New South Wales

Career statistics
Competition	First-class
Matches	43
Runs scored	1,898
Batting average	32.16
100s/50s	4/6
Top score	161
Catches/stumpings	46/30
- Source: Cricinfo, 15 March 2023

Andrew Thomas Ratcliffe (3 May 1891 – 31 August 1974) was an Australian cricketer. He played 43 first-class matches, mostly for New South Wales, between 1913/14 and 1928/29.

A wicketkeeper-batsman, Ratcliffe's highest first-class score was 161 for an Australian XI against New South Wales in October 1924, out of a team total of 310. He toured New Zealand in 1920–21 with the Australians, playing in the two matches against New Zealand. He captained New South Wales against the touring New Zealanders in January 1926, scoring 128.

== See also ==
- List of New South Wales representative cricketers
