= Jack Doig =

New Zealand cricketer (1872–1951)

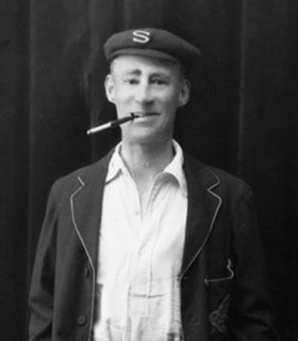
- Doig pictured in about 1920

Personal information
- Full name: John Allen Doig
- Born: 24 March 1872; Beechworth, Victoria, Australia
- Died: 24 November 1951 (aged 79); Invercargill, Southland, New Zealand

Domestic team information
- Years: Team
- 1914/15–1920/21: Southland

Career statistics
Competition	First-class
Matches	7
Runs scored	118
Batting average	9.07
100s/50s	0/0
Top score	29
Balls bowled	1,469
Wickets	38
Bowling average	15.78
5 wickets in innings	5
10 wickets in match	1
Best bowling	7/46
Catches/stumpings	5/–
- Source: CricketArchive, 4 May 2014

John Allen Doig (24 March 1872 – 24 November 1951) was an Australian-born cricketer who played first-class cricket in New Zealand for Southland between the 1914–15 and 1920–21 seasons.

== Personal life ==
Doig's family moved from Australia to New Zealand when he was a small boy. Doig and his first wife Alexandra (née Broome) had two daughters. She died in 1906 and he married Alice (née Hast) in 1907; they had a son and a daughter. He worked at various times as a blacksmith, insurance agent and sports store owner. He lived most of his life in Invercargill.

== Cricket career ==
Doig opened the bowling for Southland in March 1911 and took six wickets when Southland beat Rangitikei to become the first winners of the Hawke Cup. Along with Hugh Bannerman and Don Hamilton he was nominated by the Southland Cricket Association for the tour to Australia in 1913–14. But they were not playing for one of the four major teams, and they were not selected.

When Southland had first-class status from 1914–15 to 1920–21, Doig played in seven of their eight matches, taking 38 wickets at 15.78. Southland's first-class debut came in the match against Otago at Rugby Park, Invercargill, in February 1915. At the age of 42 Doig made his own first-class debut, along with nine of his team-mates. He opened the bowling and took 7 for 46 in the first innings, but Otago won comfortably. In the match against Otago at Rugby Park in March 1919 he bowled unchanged through both innings, taking 5 for 43 off 24 eight-ball overs in the first innings, and 5 for 41 off 32.3 overs in the second, but Otago won again.

In Southland's only first-class victory, against Otago at Rugby Park in March 1920, Doig took 2 for 74 and 6 for 21, he and his opening partner Dan McBeath taking 19 wickets in the match. In his last first-class match, in March 1921, a few days before his 49th birthday, he took 5 for 102 for Southland against the touring Australians at Rugby Park, including the wickets of Vic Richardson and Alan Kippax. In his five first-class matches at Rugby Park he took 31 wickets at an average of 12.70.

Doig was still opening the bowling for Southland at the age of 50 in 1923 when they played MCC. He organised Invercargill teams to tour the surrounding country districts annually in the 1920s and 1930s. He was a member of the Invercargill Cricket Club for forty-six years, and he was also prominent in Southland in playing or administering Rugby football, hockey, athletics, basketball, boxing and golf.
