= Cecil Alloo =

New Zealand soldier and cricketer

Personal information
- Full name: Howard Cecil Alloo
- Born: 28 April 1895; Sydney, New South Wales, Australia
- Died: 23 October 1989 (aged 94); Timaru, New Zealand
- Batting: Right-handed
- Relatives: Albert Alloo (brother); Arthur Alloo (brother)

Domestic team information
- Years: Team
- 1913/14–1930/31: Otago

Career statistics
Competition	First-class
Matches	22
Runs scored	744
Batting average	19.07
100s/50s	0/2
Top score	62
Balls bowled	286
Wickets	3
Bowling average	58.00
5 wickets in innings	0
10 wickets in match	0
Best bowling	2/59
Catches/stumpings	14/–
- Source: CricketArchive, 30 April 2014

Howard Cecil Alloo (28 April 1895 – 23 October 1989) was a New Zealand soldier, cricketer and lawyer.

Alloo played first-class cricket for Otago in New Zealand between 1919 and 1929. His highest score was 62 against Wellington in 1922–23.

His brothers Arthur and Albert also played for Otago. The brothers were the grandsons of John Alloo, a Chinese-born businessman on the Ballarat goldfields, and his wife, née Margaret Peacock, who had come out from Scotland. John and Margaret moved to the Otago goldfields in 1868, where he was employed by the Otago Police Force as a constable-interpreter.

In World War I, Cecil Alloo served overseas in the Otago Infantry Battalion. Initially a sergeant, he was commissioned as a second lieutenant in mid-1918 and posted to C Company of the New Zealand Rifle Brigade. He was wounded in the Second Battle of Bapaume in August and invalided to England.

He joined his brother Albert's law firm after the war, and later practised in Owaka and then in Timaru. He also served in the army during World War II, this time in New Zealand.
