= Oswald Asher =

Australian cricketer

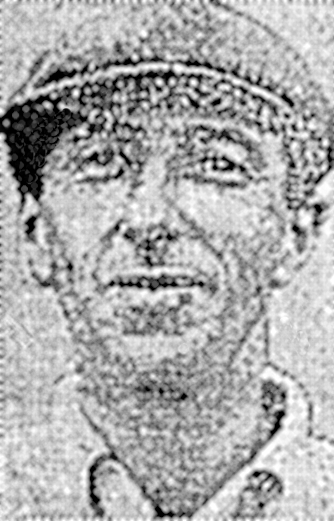

Personal information
- Born: 21 May 1891; Sydney, Australia
- Died: 16 July 1970 (aged 79); Waverton, New South Wales, Australia
- Source: ESPNcricinfo, 22 December 2016

Oswald Asher (21 May 1891 – 16 July 1970) was an Australian cricketer. He played fourteen first-class matches for New South Wales between 1919/20 and 1925/26.

== See also ==
- List of New South Wales representative cricketers
