= Dan McBeath =

New Zealand cricketer (1897–1963)

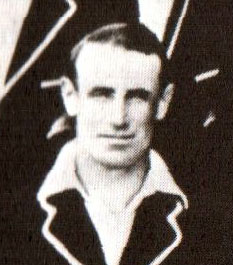
- McBeath during the 1920s

Personal information
- Full name: Daniel Jason McBeath
- Born: 8 April 1897; Malvern, Canterbury, New Zealand
- Died: 13 April 1963 (aged 66); Timaru, South Canterbury, New Zealand
- Batting: Left-handed
- Bowling: Left-arm medium

Domestic team information
- Years: Team
- 1917/18: Otago
- 1918/19–1921/22: Canterbury
- 1919/20–1920/21: Southland
- 1922/23: Otago
- 1923/24–1926/27: Canterbury
- 1930/31: South Canterbury

Career statistics
Competition	First-class
Matches	32
Runs scored	346
Batting average	10.17
100s/50s	0/0
Top score	35
Balls bowled	8,061
Wickets	170
Bowling average	20.83
5 wickets in innings	15
10 wickets in match	3
Best bowling	9/56
Catches/stumpings	19/–
- Source: CricketArchive, 3 May 2014

Daniel Jason McBeath (8 April 1897 – 13 April 1963) was a New Zealand cricketer who played first-class cricket between the 1917–18 and 1926–27 seasons. He was born at Malvern in the Canterbury Region in 1897.

== Cricket career ==
=== Otago and Canterbury, 1917–18 and 1918–19 ===
After service overseas with the Canterbury Infantry Battalion during World War I, Dan McBeath made his first-class debut on Christmas Day 1917 for Otago against Canterbury, opening the bowling and taking 6 for 52 and 3 for 50.

Transferring to Canterbury in 1918–19, he was the leading wicket-taker in the Plunket Shield, taking 25 wickets at an average of 17.68. In the match against Auckland he took 15 wickets: 9 for 56 (eight of them were bowled; he bowled unchanged through the innings, and would have taken the tenth wicket but for a dropped catch) and 6 for 112. Canterbury won and retained the Plunket Shield. It was the first time anyone had taken nine wickets in an innings or 15 wickets in a match in the Plunket Shield.

=== Southland, 1919-20 and 1920-21 ===
In 1919-20 and 1920-21 McBeath played four matches for Southland, taking 35 wickets at an average of 8.45. He took 7 for 59 when Southland lost by an innings to Otago in 1919–20, and made 32 and 28 not out as well as taking 7 for 66 and 4 for 28 (bowling unchanged in each innings) in the return match to give Southland their only first-class victory.

The next season, he took 8 for 84 and 5 for 8 against Canterbury, and 4 for 51 in a rain-ruined match against the touring Australians. He was selected for both matches New Zealand played against Australia at the end of the season, and took six wickets. At the end of the tour the Australian manager, Thomas Howard, said McBeath was the best bowler the Australians had faced in New Zealand.

At this stage in his career he had played 11 first-class matches and taken 81 wickets for 1133 runs at an average of 13.98.

=== Canterbury and Otago, 1921–22 and 1922–23 ===
Playing for Canterbury in 1921–22, McBeath took 8 for 96 against Auckland. He took 12 wickets in two matches for Otago in the Plunket Shield in 1922–23, and played in the third of three matches New Zealand played against the MCC, taking three wickets.

=== Canterbury, 1923–24 to 1926–27 ===
Returning to Canterbury in 1923–24, McBeath took 17 wickets in the Plunket Shield. He played both matches for New Zealand against New South Wales, taking seven wickets.

He took 14 wickets at 15.78 in the Plunket Shield in 1924–25, including 6 for 32 against Otago. He played in both matches New Zealand played against the touring Victorian team, taking 5 for 89 in the first innings in Wellington.

He toured Australia with the New Zealand team in 1925–26, playing in two of the state matches, with moderate success. His last first-class match came when he was still only 29, in 1926–27, when he took four wickets for Canterbury against Wellington.

== Later life ==
McBeath moved to Timaru in the late 1920s, where he owned a garage. He represented South Canterbury at cricket, and was a member of the South Canterbury Cricket Association committee. He died at Timaru in 1963 at the age of 66.
