= Mid Canterbury cricket team =

New Zealand cricket team

Personnel
- Coach: Garfield Charles
- Owner: Mid Canterbury Cricket Association

Team information
- Founded: 1896
- Home ground: Ashburton Domain, Ashburton

History
- Hawke Cup wins: 1
- Official website: Mid Canterbury Cricket

The Mid Canterbury cricket team represents the Mid Canterbury region of the South Island of New Zealand, with its headquarters in Ashburton. Its governing body is the Mid Canterbury Cricket Association. It is one of the 21 teams from around New Zealand that compete in the Hawke Cup. Until 1996 it was known as Ashburton County.

== History ==
=== Ashburton County ===
Cricket in the Ashburton area extends back at least as far as the 1860s. An Ashburton team played a team from Christchurch in South Rakaia in October 1866. Shortly after the creation of Ashburton County, the Ashburton County Cricket Club was formed in September 1877. It was dissolved in 1886 and re-formed as Ashburton Cricket Club. The Ashburton County Cricket Association was formed in 1896.

A 15-man Ashburton County team captained by Godfrey Harper played the touring Australian XI in March 1921, losing by 10 wickets. The team began competing in the Hawke Cup in the 1950s, and played in six challenge matches between 1959 and 1977, but never won the title.

=== Mid Canterbury ===
On its centenary in 1996, the association changed its name to Mid Canterbury Cricket Association. The team won the Hawke Cup for the first time in February 2004 when, captained by Robert Madden, they beat Northland on the first innings.

The five clubs in the Mid Canterbury Cricket Association are Allenton, Coldstream, Lauriston, Methven and Technical.
