= Southland cricket team =

New Zealand cricket team

- Southland, Hawke Cup winners, March 1911

Personnel
- Owner: Southland Cricket Association

Team information
- Founded: 1892
- Home ground: Queen's Park, Invercargill

History
- Hawke Cup wins: 6
- Official website: www.southlandcricket.co.nz

The Southland cricket team represents the Southland Region of New Zealand. It is one of the 21 teams from around New Zealand that compete in the Hawke Cup.

== Early history ==
Southland first played interprovincial cricket in 1864, and often played against touring teams from Australia, Fiji and England. The Southland Cricket Association was formed in 1892, leading to an increase in representative matches, including the annual match against Otago, which began in 1893–94 and continued until the 1980s. In 1910–11 Southland were the first winners of the Hawke Cup. They retained it in 1911–12 but surrendered it in 1912–13 when they did not take part.

== First-class matches ==
At its quarterly meeting in May 1914, the New Zealand Cricket Council granted Southland first-class status, which included the right to challenge for the Plunket Shield. Southland held first-class status from 1914–15 to 1920–21, but did not play any Plunket Shield matches. They played eight first-class matches, winning one, losing five and drawing two.

In 1914–15 Southland played two matches against Otago, losing the first and drawing the second. In the first match, at Rugby Park, Invercargill, Otago made 166 (Jack Doig taking 7 for 46) and 85 for 3 declared, and Southland 71 and 62. In the second match, at Carisbrook, Dunedin, Southland made 226 (Arthur Poole scoring 77, which remained Southland's highest score) and 152, Otago 212 and 50 for 3.

In 1917–18 at Carisbrook, Otago won by an innings, making 313 and dismissing Southland for 149 and 108. The opening batsman Horace Gleeson scored 55 (Southland's only other score of 50 or more) and 21. In 1918–19 at Rugby Park, Otago made only 94 and 88 (Jack Doig taking 5 for 43 and 5 for 41), yet still comfortably defeated Southland, Henry Holderness and Arthur Alloo dismissing them for 41 and 55. Only six players on either team reached double figures.

In 1919–20 Southland lost their first match against Otago at Carisbrook by an innings, scoring only 55 and 42 to Otago's 144 (in which Dan McBeath took 7 for 59). However, they won the return match at Rugby Park. Otago batted first, scoring 180, with Dan McBeath taking 7 for 66. Southland replied with 179. Then Doig (6 for 21) and McBeath (4 for 28) dismissed Otago for 50. Needing 52 to win, Southland lost wickets cheaply but McBeath, who had made 32 in the first innings, this time made 28 not out and took Southland to victory by four wickets.

In 1920–21 Southland played Canterbury at Rugby Park. Canterbury made 189 (McBeath 8 for 84) and 37 (McBeath 5 for 8), beating Southland, who made 90 and 56, by 80 runs. Reg Read took 14 wickets for 59 for Canterbury. Three weeks later Southland played their final first-class match, against the touring Australians at Rugby Park. Southland made 122 and dismissed the Australians for 195 (Doig 5 for 102, McBeath 4 for 51) before rain washed out the rest of the match.

== Leading first-class players ==
The opening bowlers Dan McBeath and Jack Doig were Southland's two outstanding players. In four matches McBeath took 35 wickets at an average of 8.45. In seven matches Doig took 38 wickets at 15.78. Arthur Poole was the leading run-scorer with 223 runs in six matches at an average of 20.27. Doig and Poole were among those in the team who played first-class cricket only for Southland. There were five captains.

== Later history ==
Along with Hawke's Bay, Southland lost their first-class status after the 1920–21 season, leaving just four first-class teams in New Zealand: Auckland, Canterbury, Otago and Wellington. In reorganising domestic first-class cricket, the New Zealand Cricket Council chose only those teams that could afford to travel to take part in an annual round robin tournament for the Plunket Shield.

From 1921, for first-class (and in later years List A and Twenty20) cricket purposes Southland merged with Otago. However, Southland continued to play non-first-class matches on their own. They played against some touring teams and resumed their participation in the Hawke Cup in the 1929–30 season.

Southland have won the Hawke Cup six times, most recently in March 2018. Their longest periods of success have been when they held the trophy from March 1973 to February 1977, and from February 1989 to February 1992. They play their home games at Queen's Park, Invercargill.

The Southland Cricket Association, which organises cricket in the region at all levels, is based in Invercargill. The six teams that play in the senior competition are Appleby, Invercargill Old Boys, Marist Invercargill, Metropolitan, Southland Boys High School and Waikoikoi.

== Leading Hawke Cup players ==
Several Southland players have represented New Zealand internationally as well as having successful careers for Southland in the Hawke Cup and Otago in the Plunket Shield. The Test leg-spinner Jack Alabaster played 14 matches for Southland and took 92 wickets at an average of 13.29. His brother Gren Alabaster played 20 Hawke Cup matches and took 102 wickets at an average of 14.78. Robert Anderson, another Test player, played 16 Hawke Cup games and scored 1773 runs at an average of 70.29. When, to celebrate the centenary of the Hawke Cup, a team of the century was selected from all the participating teams, Gren Alabaster was named the captain, and the other Southland players chosen were Anderson and Richard Hoskin.

== See also ==
- List of Southland representative cricketers
