= 1924 in New Zealand =

- Decades: 1900s; 1910s; 1920s; 1930s; 1940s
- See also: History of New Zealand; List of years in New Zealand; Timeline of New Zealand history

The following lists events that happened during 1924 in New Zealand.

== Incumbents ==
=== Regal and viceregal ===
- Head of State – George V
- Governor-General – John Jellicoe, Viscount Jellicoe until 26 November, then Sir Charles Fergusson from 13 December
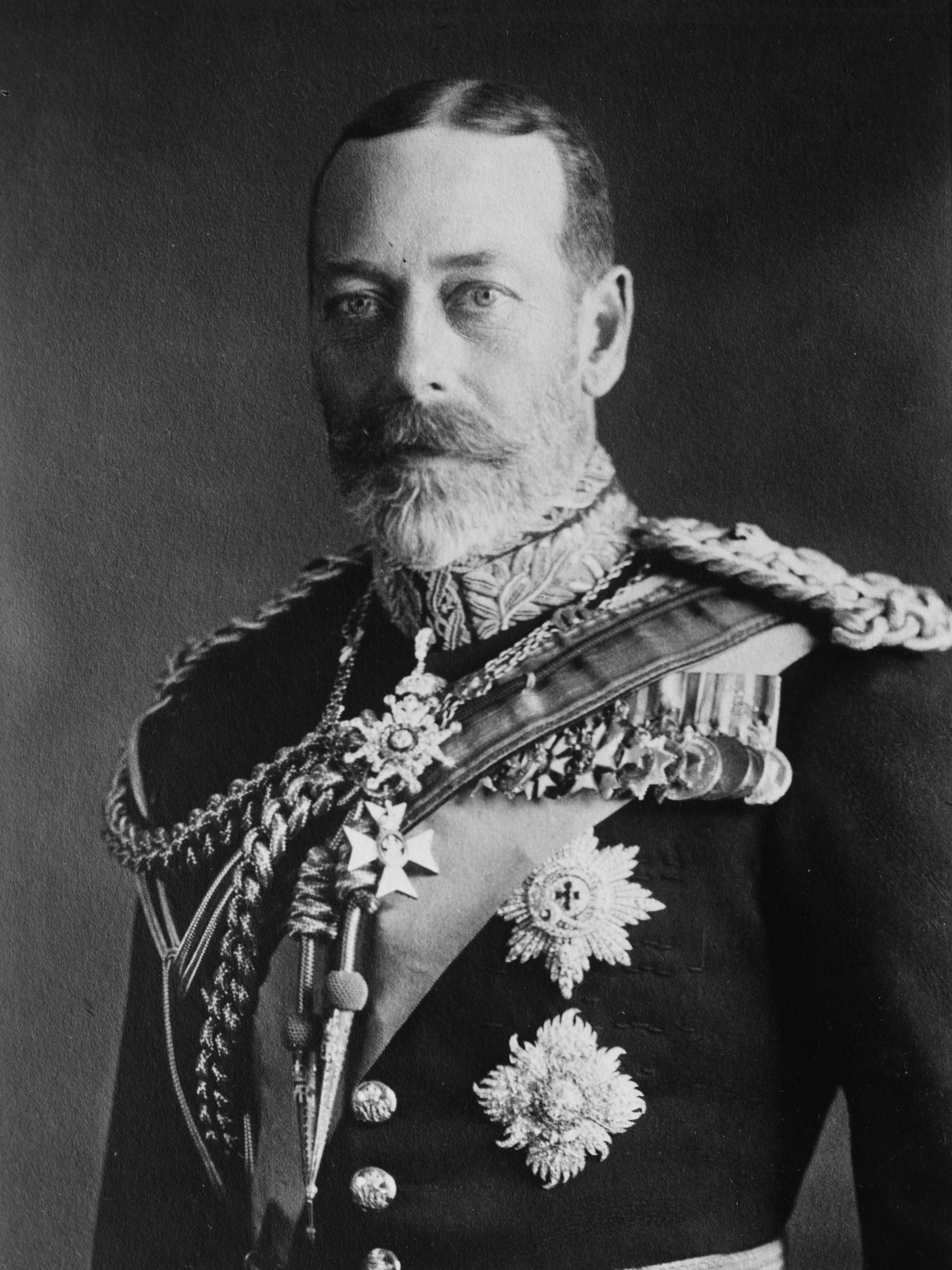
George V

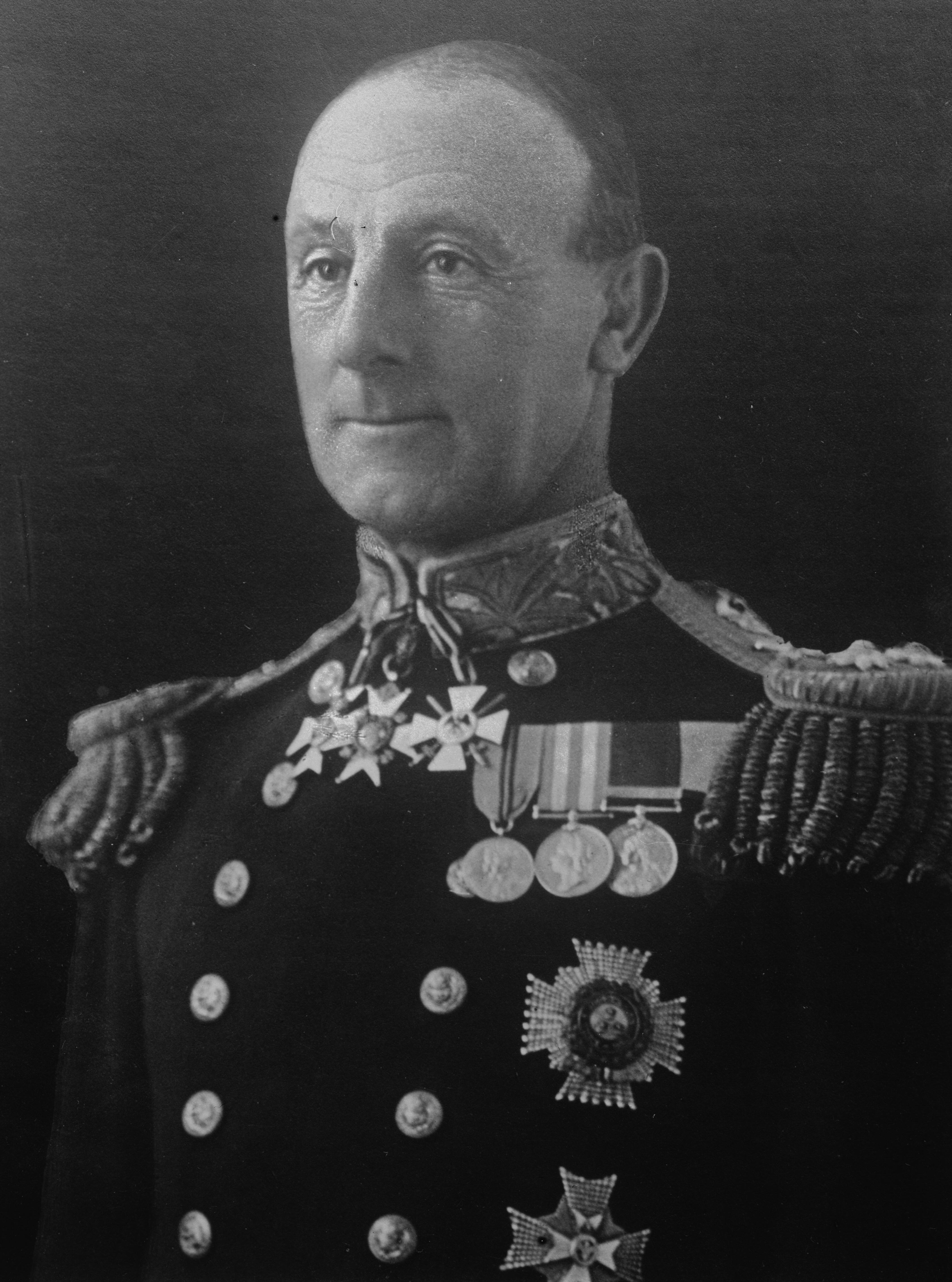
Viscount Jellicoe

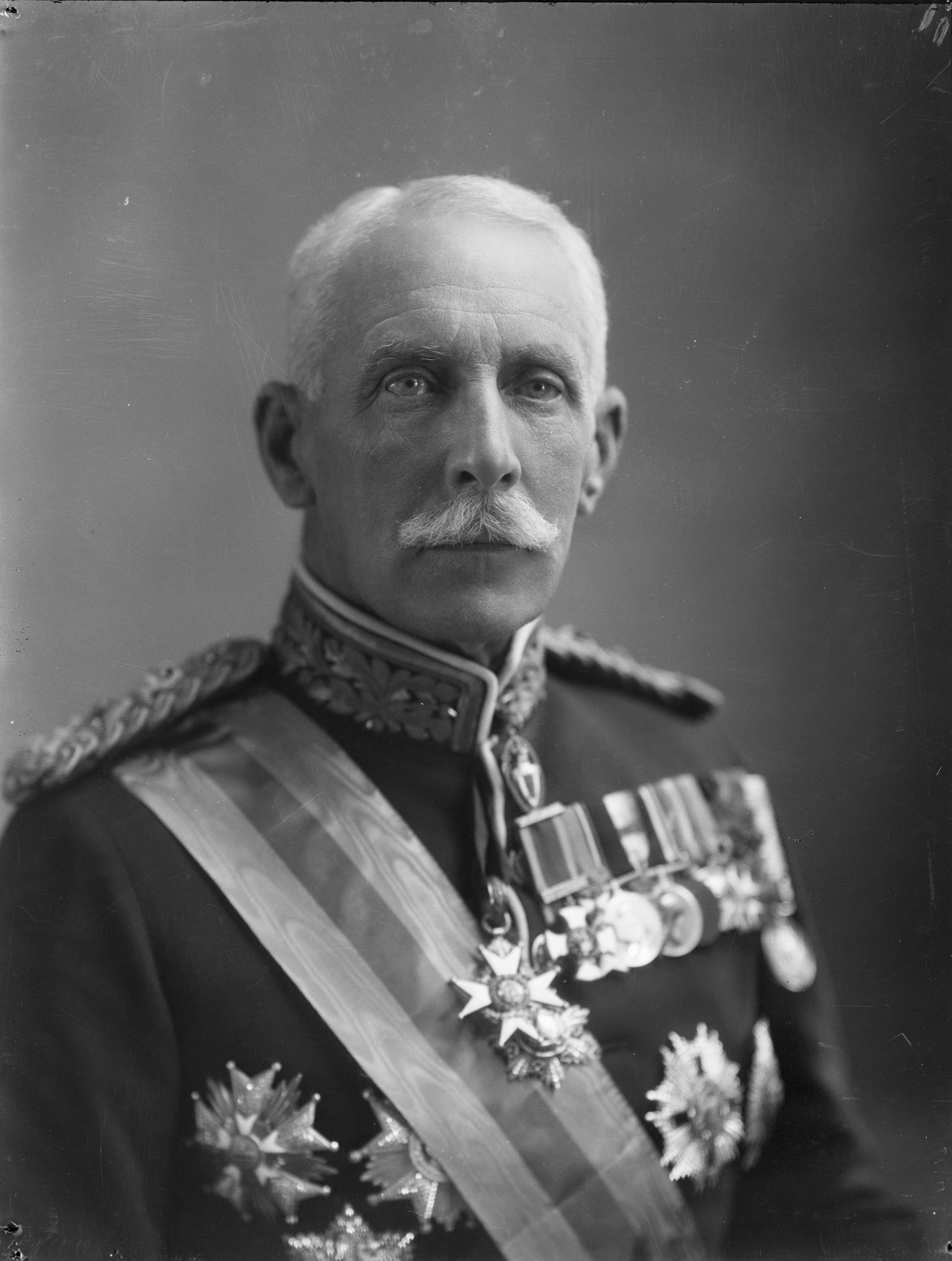
Sir Charles Fergusson

=== Government ===
The 21st New Zealand Parliament continues. The Reform Party governs as a minority with the support of independents.

- Speaker of the House – Charles Statham
- Prime Minister – William Massey
- Minister of Finance – William Massey
- Minister of External Affairs – Francis Bell
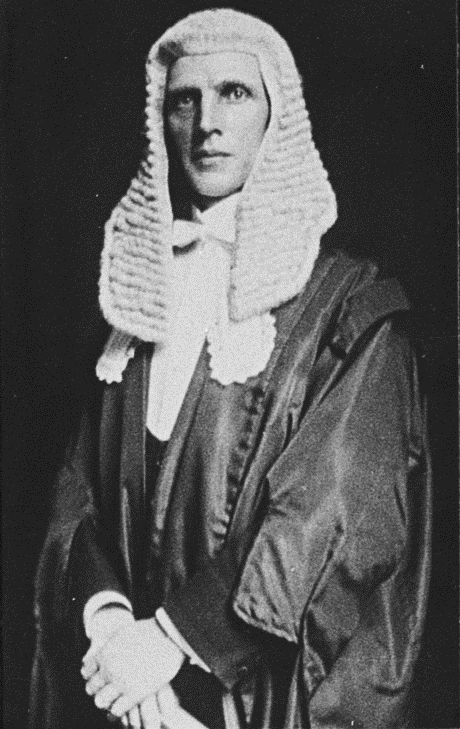
Charles Statham

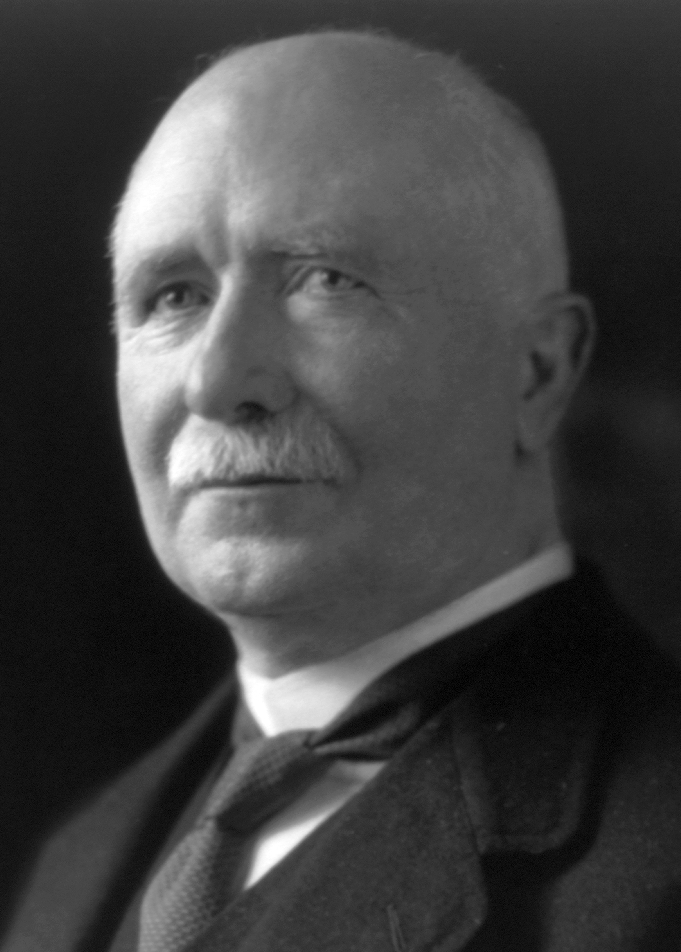
William Massey

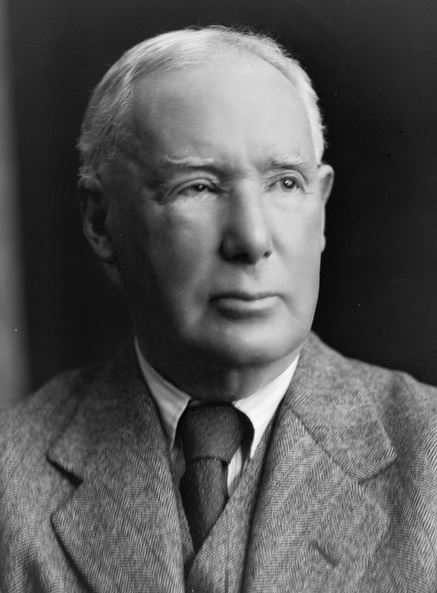
Francis Bell

=== Parliamentary opposition ===
- Leader of the Opposition – Thomas Wilford (Liberal Party)
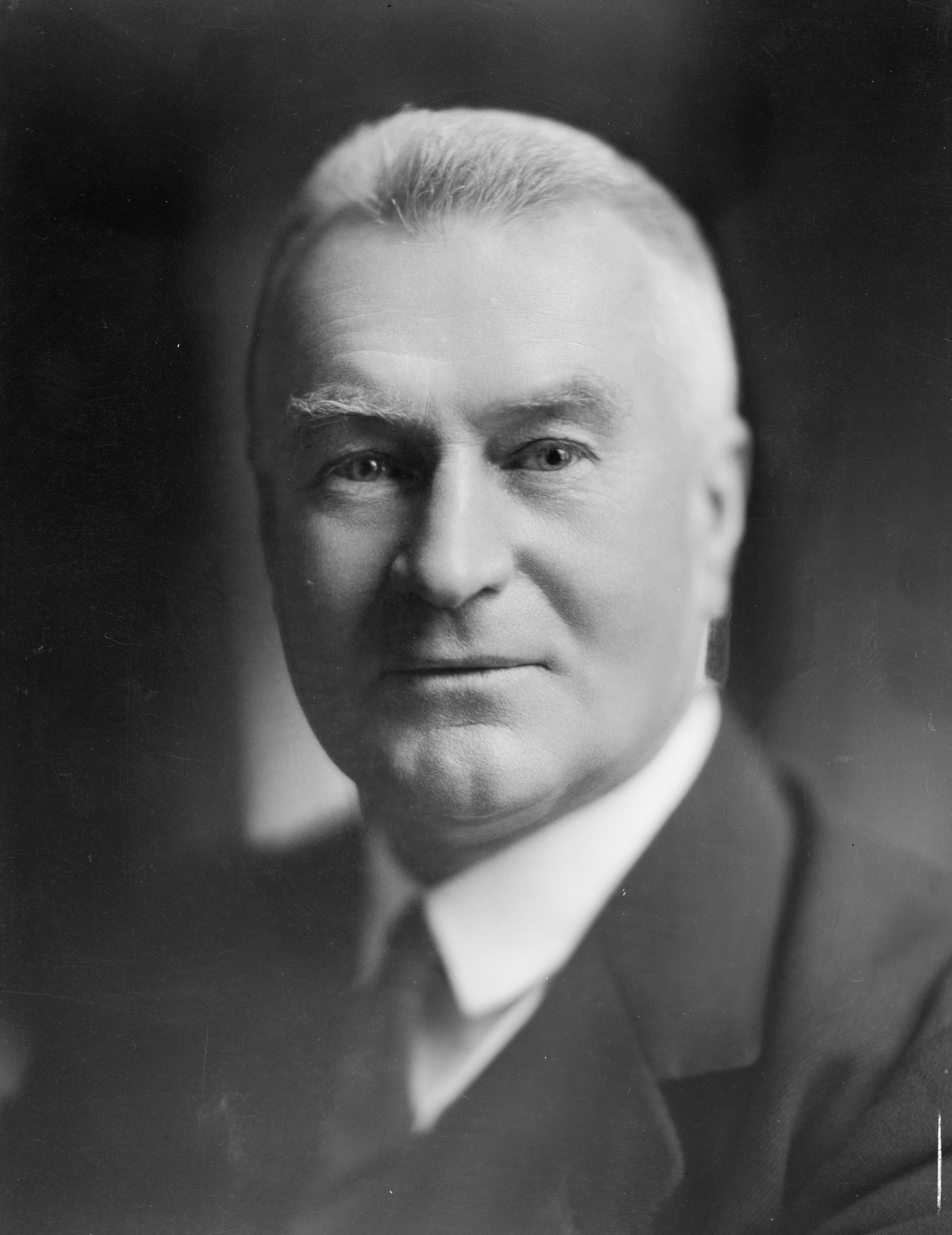
Thomas Wilford

=== Judiciary ===
- Chief Justice – Sir Robert Stout
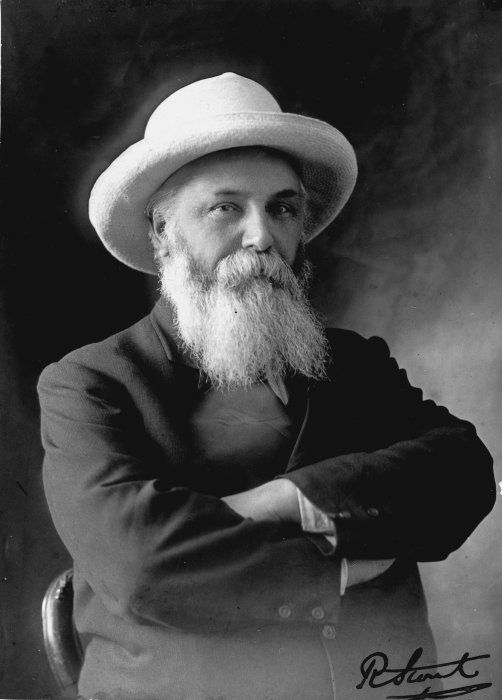
Robert Stout

=== Main centre leaders ===
- Mayor of Auckland – James Gunson
- Mayor of Wellington – Robert Wright
- Mayor of Christchurch – James Flesher
- Mayor of Dunedin – Harold Tapley
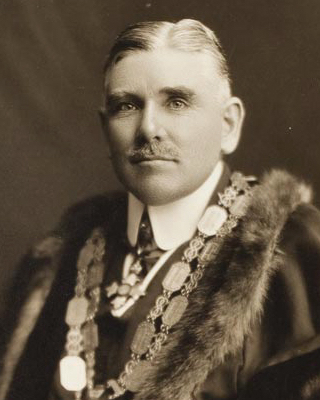
James Gunson

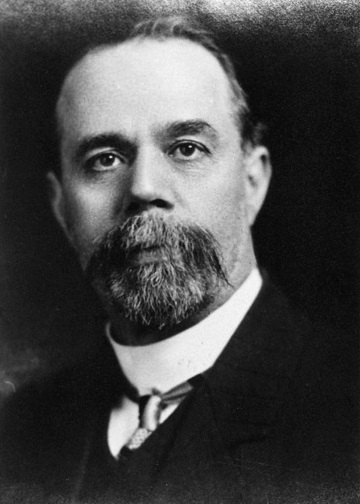
Robert Wright

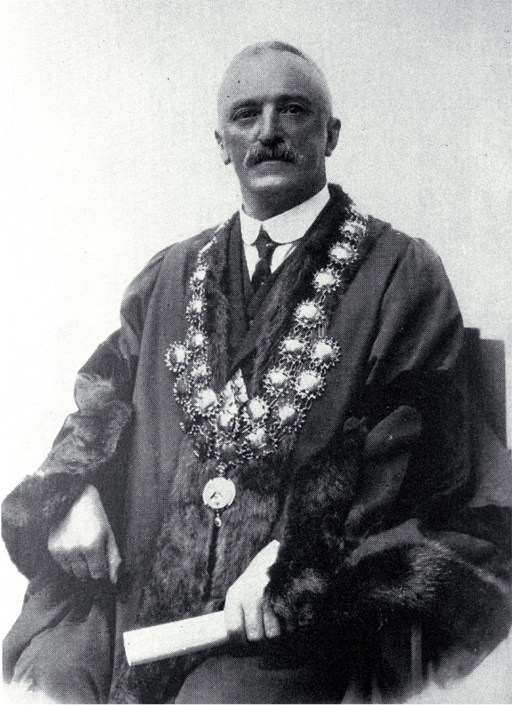
James Flesher

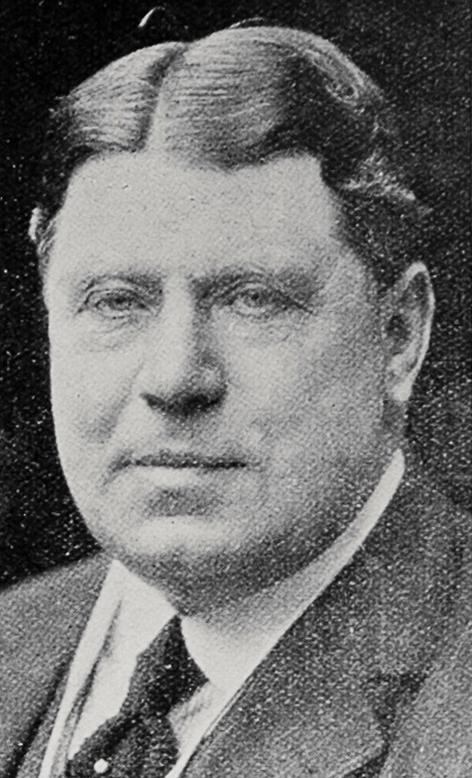
Harold Tapley

== Events ==
- 29 September – The first trolleybus route in Wellington is inaugurated
- 4 July – The name for Four Square is established
- 17 November – HMS Torch hits a rock in the Chatham Islands, and is subsequently beached and abandoned
- Undated – Actinidia deliciosa 'Hayward', later to become the main commercial cultivar of kiwifruit, is first grown

== Arts and literature ==
See 1924 in art, 1924 in literature Category:1924 books

=== Music ===
See: 1924 in music

=== Broadcasting ===
See: Public broadcasting in New Zealand

=== Film ===
- Venus of the South Seas

See: 1924 in film, List of New Zealand feature films, Cinema of New Zealand, Category:1924 films

== Sport ==
=== Chess ===
- The 33rd National Chess Championship is held in Wellington, and is won by S. Crakanthorp of Sydney.

=== Football ===
- The 2nd Chatham Cup is won by Harbour Board (Auckland)
- A Chinese Universities football team tours New Zealand, including four matches against the national team:
  - 16 August, at Auckland: New Zealand win 2–1
  - 23 August, at Wellington: draw 2–2
  - 6 September, at Dunedin: New Zealand win 5–3
  - 13 September, at Christchurch: New Zealand win 4–2
- Provincial league champions:
  - Auckland – Harbour Board
  - Canterbury – Sunnyside
  - Hawke's Bay – Whakatu
  - Nelson – Athletic
  - Otago – Seacliff
  - South Canterbury – Albion Rovers
  - Southland – Corinthians
  - Taranaki – Kaponga
  - Wanganui – YMCA
  - Wellington – YMCA

=== Golf ===
- The 11th New Zealand Open championship is won by Ernie Moss, with an aggregate of 301.
- The 28th National Amateur Championships are held in Auckland (men) and Hamilton (women)
  - Men – L. Quin (Eltham)
  - Women – Mrs Peake (Cambridge)

=== Horse racing ===
==== Harness racing ====
- New Zealand Trotting Cup – Sheik
- Auckland Trotting Cup – Locanda Mac

==== Thoroughbred racing ====
- New Zealand Cup – Sunart
- Auckland Cup – Te Kara
- Wellington Cup – Loughrea
- New Zealand Derby – Count Cavour
- ARC Great Northern Derby – Ballymena

=== Lawn bowls ===
The national outdoor lawn bowls championships are held in Christchurch.

- Men's singles champion – W. Carswell (Taieri Bowling Club)
- Men's pair champions – James Angus, J. A. Redpath (skip) (Canterbury Bowling Club)
- Men's fours champions – W. Ure, H. S. Hill, C. G. Maher, Bill Bremner (skip) (West End Bowling Club, Auckland)

=== Olympic games ===
Gold	Silver	Bronze	Total
0	0	1	1

- New Zealand sends a team of four competitors across three sports
- Arthur Porritt wins the bronze medal in the men's 100 metres

=== Rugby league ===
- New Zealand host the touring Great Britain team, winning the test series 2–1
  - 1st test, at Dunedin, lose 18–31
  - 2nd test, at Wellington, win 13–11
  - 3rd test, at Auckland, win 16–8

=== Rugby union ===
- The All Blacks tour the United Kingdom, Ireland, France and Canada between September 1924 and February 1925, winning all 32 games, and earning the nickname The Invincibles
- The Ranfurly Shield is held and defended by Hawkes Bay all season

=== Wrestling ===
- Ike Robin is recognised as New Zealand's first wrestling champion

== Births ==
=== January ===
- 5 January – Ivan Wyatt, cricketer (d. 2009)
- 11 January – Rex Cunningham, rugby league player (d. 2015)
- 13 January – Brian Barratt-Boyes, heart surgeon (d. 2006)
- 15 January
  - Barbara Angus, diplomat, historian (d. 2005)
  - George Lowe, mountaineer and explorer (d. 2013)
- 21 January
  - Bill Andersen, trade unionist (d. 2005)
  - Ronald Sinclair, actor, film editor (d. 1992)
- 22 January – Ortvin Sarapu, chess player (d. 1999)
- 27 January
  - Lyn Philp, boxer (d. 1981)
  - Hector Wilson, rugby union player (d. 2004)
- 28 January – Wharetutu Stirling, Ngāi Tahu leader, conservationist (d. 1993)

=== February ===
- 14 February
  - Bos Murphy, boxer (d. 2000)
  - Reg Singer, association footballer (d. 2001)
- 24 February – Jack Forrest, rugby league player (d. 2016)
- 27 February – John Shanahan, swimmer (d. 1987)
- 29 February – David Beattie, jurist, sports administrator, 14th Governor-General of New Zealand (d. 2001)

=== March ===
- 5 March – Nau Cherrington, rugby union player (d. 1979)
- 6 March – Percy Murphy, politician, first Māori mayor (d. 2009)
- 7 March
  - J.G.A. Pocock, historian (d. 2023)
  - Brownie Pūriri, public servant (d. 1979)
- 9 March – Warren Sinclair, radiation science and medicine expert (d. 2014)
- 10 March – Peter Stichbury, potter (d. 2015)
- 22 March – Grace Gooder, cricketer (d. 1983)
- 24 March – Norm Holland, jockey (d. 2014)
- 26 March
  - Jack McNab, rugby union player, coach and administrator (d. 2009)
  - Josie Yelas, netball player (d. 1996)
- 29 March – Haydn Sherley, broadcaster (d. 2007)
- 31 March – Joan de Hamel, children's writer (d. 2011)

=== April ===
- 2 April – Lauris Edmond, poet and writer (d. 2000)
- 5 April – Barbara Hale, librarian (d. 2013)
- 3 April – Errol Brathwaite, writer (d. 2005)
- 18 April – Tiny White, equestrian (d. 2020)
- 30 April
  - Richard Giese, flautist (d. 2010)
  - Mervyn Probine, physicist, public servant (d. 2010)

=== May ===
- 1 May – Ted Johnson, rower (d. 1985)
- 5 May – Frank Creagh, boxer (d. 1998)
- 12 May – Malcolm Templeton, diplomat (d. 2017)
- 22 May – Stella Casey, social campaigner (d. 2000)

=== June ===
- 2 June – Pat Evison, actor (d. 2010)
- 3 June – Ken Armstrong, association footballer (d. 1984)
- 7 June – Bob Tizard, politician (d. 2016)
- 8 June – Ian Colquhoun, cricketer (d. 2005)
- 9 June – John Scott, architect (d. 1992)
- 14 June
  - David Ballantyne, journalist, writer (d. 1986)
  - Miriam Dell, women's advocate (d. 2022)

=== July ===
- 7 July – D. P. O'Connell, barrister, legal academic (d. 1979)
- 15 July
  - Bub Bridger, poet and short story writer (d. 2009)
  - Brian Sutton-Smith, writer and play theorist (d. 2015)
- 23 July – Betty Bourke, politician, health administrator (d. 2015)
- 25 July
  - Jim Beard, architect (d. 2017)
  - Peter Mann, Anglican bishop (d. 1999)
- 26 July – Ces Renwick, cricketer (d. 2014)
- 28 July
  - Eric Fisher, cricketer (d. 1996)
  - William Fraser, politician (d. 2001)

=== August ===
- 1 August – Peter Smith, rugby union player (d. 1954)
- 2 August – Ainsley Iggo, neurophysiologist (d. 2012)
- 7 August – Alan Wilkinson, association footballer (d. 2015)
- 12 August – Gordon Hobson, amateur wrestler (d. 1985)
- 13 August – John Rymer, Anglican cleric (d. 2003)
- 22 August – Pat O'Connor, professional wrestler (d. 1990)
- 23 August
  - Bahri Kavaja, association footballer (d. 1987)
  - Doug Mudgway, amateur wrestler (d. 1988)
- 28 August
  - Tony MacGibbon, cricketer (d. 2010)
  - Janet Frame, writer (d. 2004)
- 31 August – Don Beaven, medical researcher (d. 2009)

=== September ===
- 3 September – John Ingram, mechanical engineer, businessman (d. 2015)
- 4 September – Lory Blanchard, rugby league player and coach (d. 2013)
- 5 September – Nick Carter, cyclist (d. 2003)
- 6 September – Hugh Poole, sailor (d. 2012)
- 7 September – Wanda Cowley, children's writer (d. 2017)
- 8 September – Frank Holmes, economist (d. 2011)
- 15 September – Rex Challies, cricketer (d. 2003)
- 17 September – Les Watt, cricketer (d. 1996)
- 23 September – Peggy Hay, designer (d. 2016)
- 24 September – Sammy Guillen, cricketer (d. 2013)
- 27 September – Louis Johnson, poet (d. 1988)
- 30 September – Trevor Hatherton, geophysicist (d. 1992)

=== October ===
- 5 October – Victor Brooker, cricketer
- 11 October – Arthur Hughes, rugby union player, businessman, horse racing administrator (d. 2005)
- 19 October – Keith Gudsell, rugby union player (d. 2007)
- 30 October – Roy McLennan, politician (d. 2013)

=== November ===
- 5 November – Geoff Smale, sailor (d. 2011)
- 23 November
  - Doug Coombes, mineralogist and petrologist (d. 2016)
  - Doug Dillon, jurist (d. 1999)
- 28 November – Colin McLachlan, politician (d. 1985)

=== December ===
- 2 December
  - Gerald O'Brien, politician (d. 2017)
  - Brian Poananga, sportsman, military leader, diplomat (d. 1995)
- 5 December – Gavin Downie, politician (d. 1998)
- 7 December – Jimmy Haig, rugby union and rugby league player (d. 1996)
- 12 December
  - Neill Austin, politician (d. 2008)
  - Brown Turei, Anglican archbishop (d. 2017)
- 23 December – Len Castle, potter (d. 2011)
- 26 December – Leonard Kent, cricketer (d. 2014)
- 28 December – Loo-Chi Hu, marine equipment designer, t'ai chi teacher (d. 2013)
- 29 December
  - Eve Poole, 41st Mayor of Invercargill (d. 1992)
  - Bob Vance, cricket player and administrator (d. 1994)
  - Ivan Walsh, association footballer, cricketer (d. 2005)
- 30 December – Joe Phillips, rugby league player (d. 1969)

== Deaths ==
=== January–March ===
- 5 January – Mary Player, midwife, feminist, social reformer (born c.1857)
- 6 January – Henry Hill, cricketer (born 1845)
- 19 January – Frances Parker, suffragette (born 1875)
- 24 January – Acton Adams, politician (born 1843)
- 27 January – William Gardiner, cricketer (born 1864)
- 2 February
  - Daniel Claffey, cricketer (born 1869)
  - John Duncan, politician (born 1848)
- 11 February – Arthur Lomas, cricketer (born 1895)
- 17 February – James Tibbs, schoolteacher (born 1855)
- 22 February – Mary Dawson, farmer, environmentalist (born 1833)
- 24 February – Joseph Borton, cricketer (born 1832)
- 1 March – Elizabeth Parsons, singer (born 1846)
- 4 March – Gilbert Carson, politician (born 1842)
- 6 March – Grace Joel, artist (born 1865)
- 10 March – George Bourne, photographer (born 1875)
- 17 March – Martin Chapman, cricketer, barrister, politician (born 1846)

=== April–June ===
- 3 April – Alfred Newman, politician (born 1849)
- 19 April – Charles Louisson, politician (born 1842)
- 7 May – Alfred Luttrell, architect and building contractor (born 1865)
- 9 May – James Mason, doctor, bacteriologist, public health administrator (born 1864)
- 19 May – Joseph Pabst, cricketer (born 1870)

=== July–September ===
- 17 July – William Davidson, pioneer of refrigerated shipping (born 1846)
- 19 July – Sir Walter Buchanan. politician (born 1838)
- 25 July – Lawrence Birks, electrical engineer (born 1874)
- 10 August – Edward Wakefield, politician (born 1845)
- 19 August – Alfred Baldey, politician (born 1836)
- 17 September – Richard Vincent, cricketer (born 1846)
- 19 September – Sir John Salmond, legal academic, public servant, jurist (born 1862)
- 27 September – Thomson Leys, journalist, newspaper editor and proprietor, philanthropist (born 1850)

=== October–December ===
- 18 October – Walter Mason, cricketer (born 1847)
- 23 October – Eparaima Te Mutu Kapa, politician (born c.1842)
- 13 November – Charles Boxshall, cricketer (born 1862)
- 27 November – Joseph Grimmond, politician (born 1843)
- 15 December – Paratene Ngata, Ngāti Porou leader, politician (born c.1849)
- 19 December – William Maslin, politician (born 1850)

== See also ==
- History of New Zealand
- List of years in New Zealand
- Military history of New Zealand
- Timeline of New Zealand history
- Timeline of New Zealand's links with Antarctica
- Timeline of the New Zealand environment
