= 1926 in New Zealand =

- Decades: 1900s; 1910s; 1920s; 1930s; 1940s
- See also: History of New Zealand; List of years in New Zealand; Timeline of New Zealand history

The following lists events that happened during 1926 in New Zealand.

== Population ==
The 1926 New Zealand census is held on 20 April.

	Male	Female	Total
Usually resident population	716,310 (51%)	687,330 (49%)	1,403,640
Overseas visitors	3,333	1,167	4,500
Total	719,643	688,497	1,408,140

== Incumbents ==
=== Regal and viceregal ===
- Head of State – George V
- Governor-General – Sir Charles Fergusson
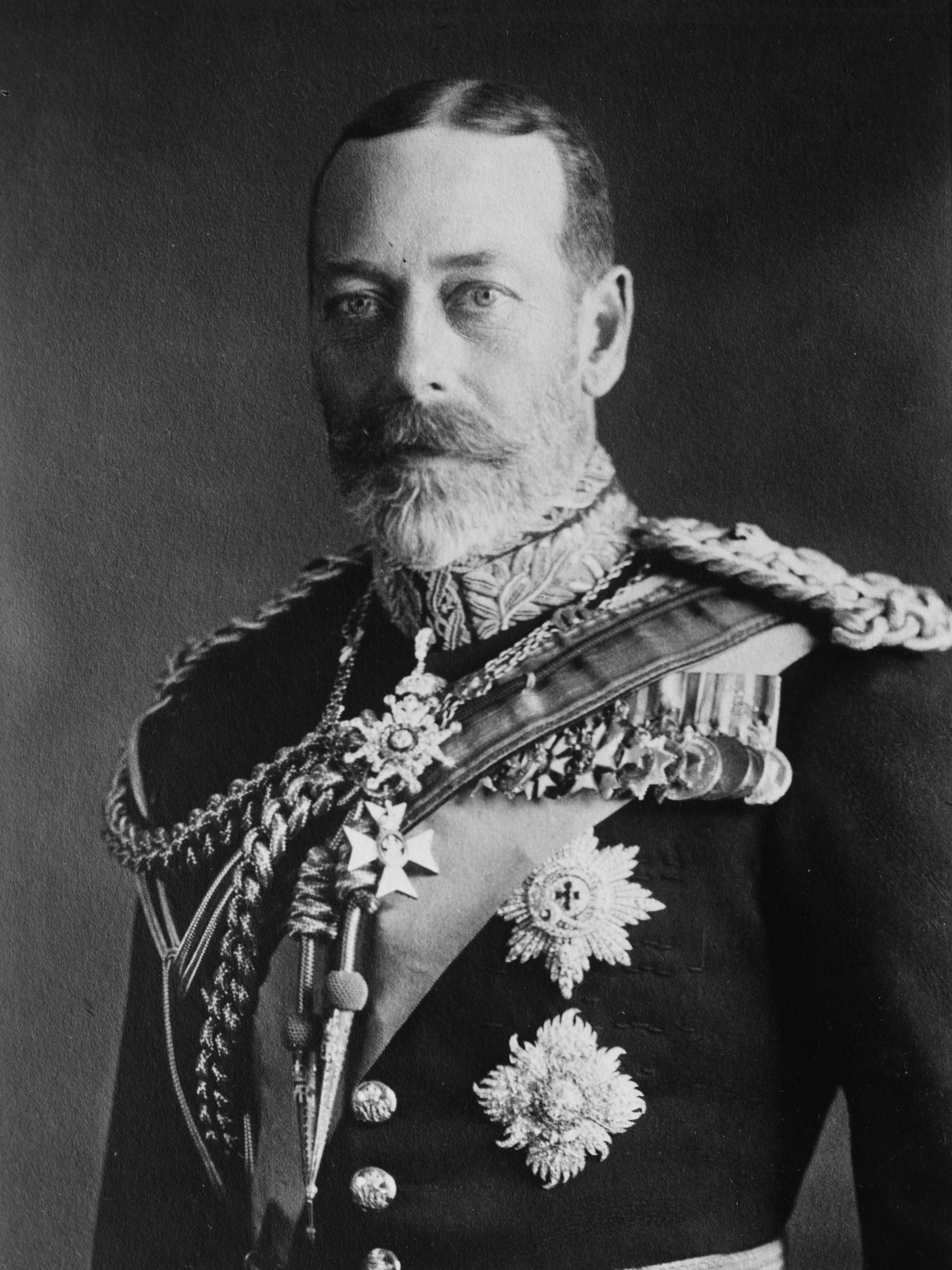
George V

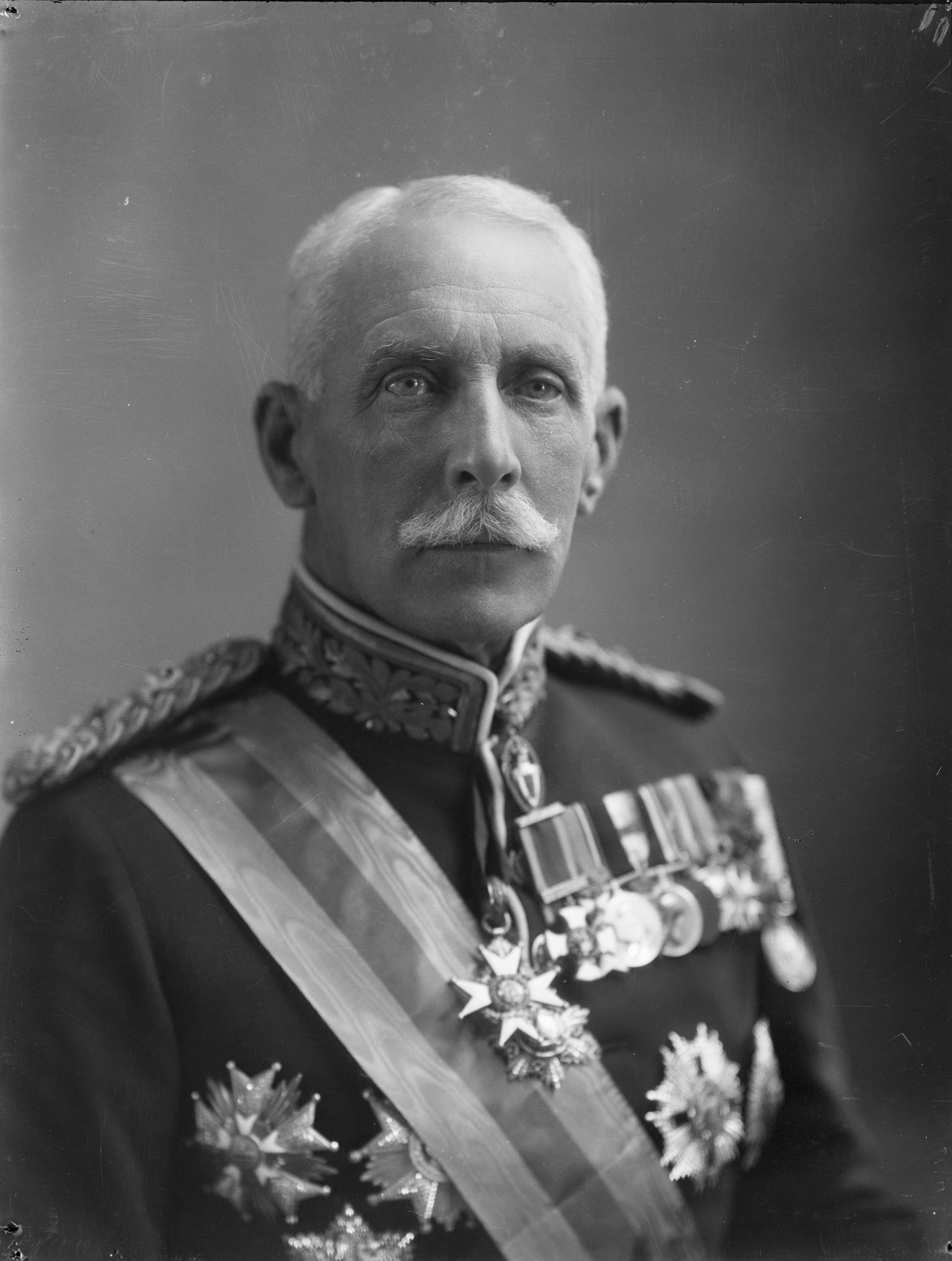
Sir Charles Fergusson

=== Government ===
The 22nd New Zealand Parliament continues with the Reform Party governing.

- Speaker of the House – Charles Statham
- Prime Minister – Gordon Coates
- Minister of Finance – William Nosworthy until 24 May, then William Downie Stewart
- Minister of External Affairs – Francis Bell until 18 January, then from 24 May William Nosworthy
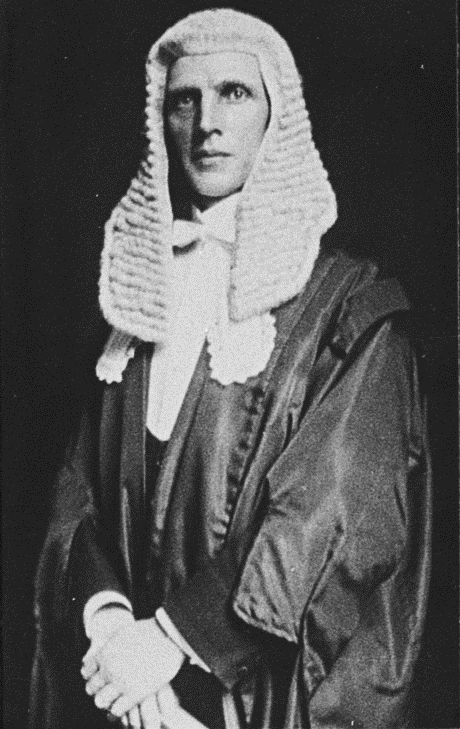
Charles Statham

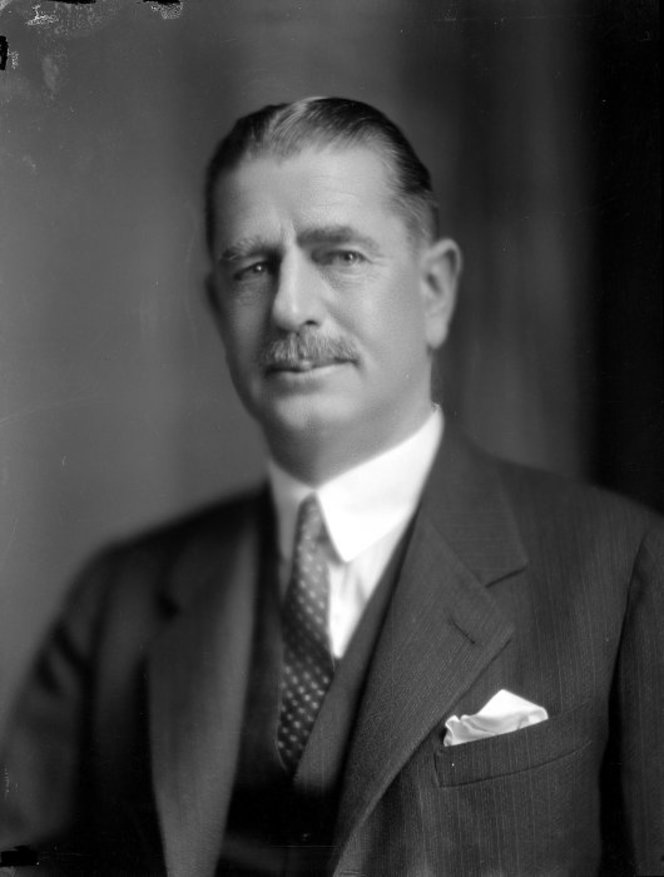
Gordon Coates

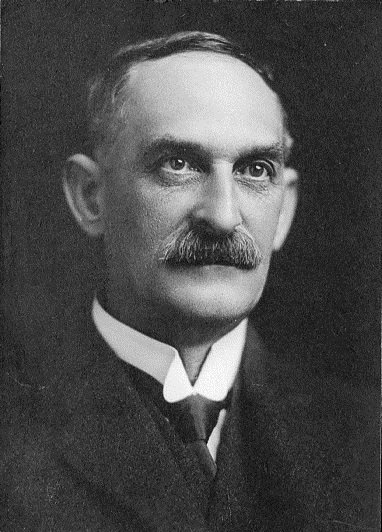
William Nosworthy

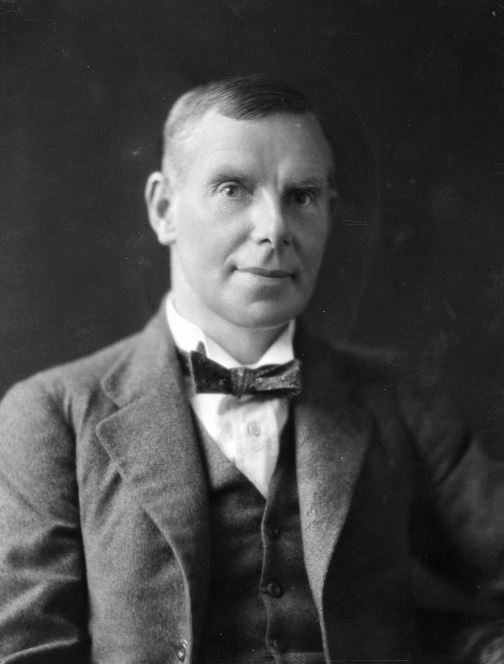
William Downie Stewart

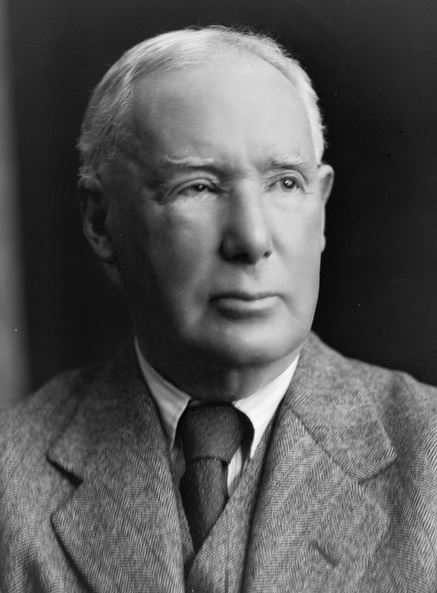
Francis Bell

=== Parliamentary opposition ===
- Leader of the Opposition – vacant until 26 June, then Harry Holland (Labour Party)
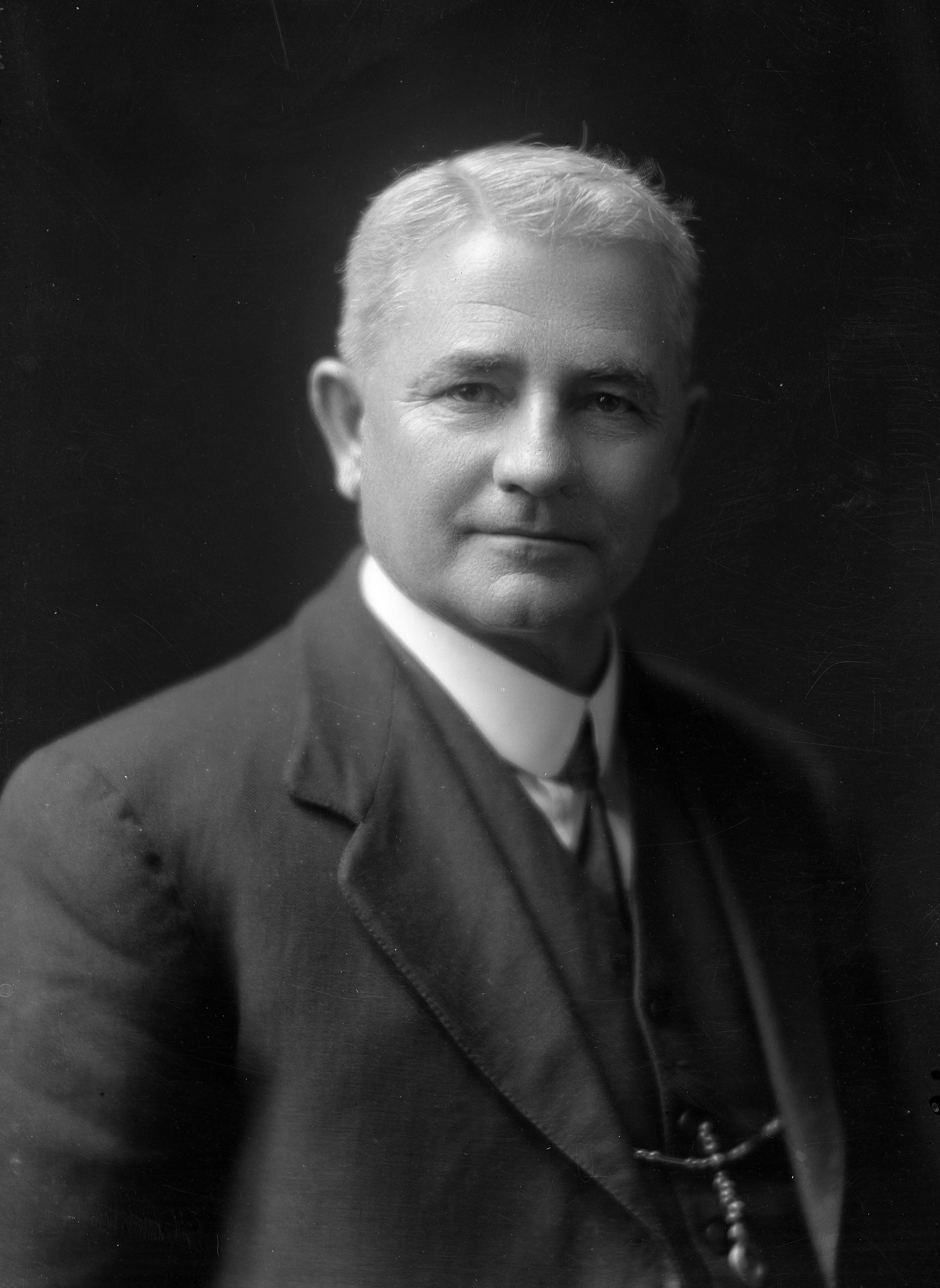
Harry Holland

=== Judiciary ===
- Chief Justice – Sir Robert Stout, then Charles Skerrett from 1 February
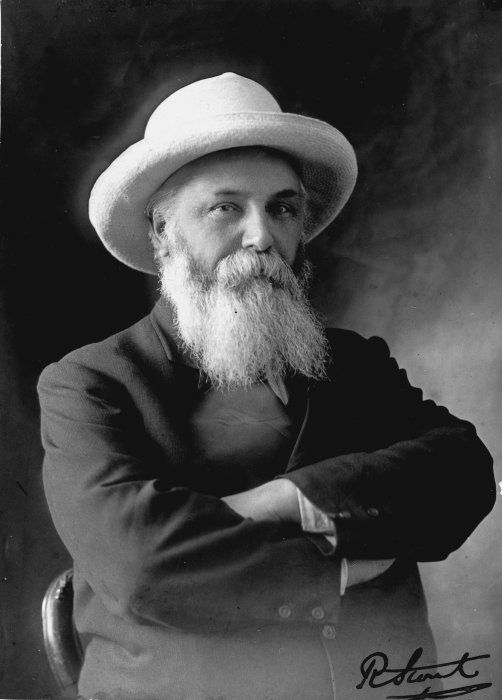
Robert Stout

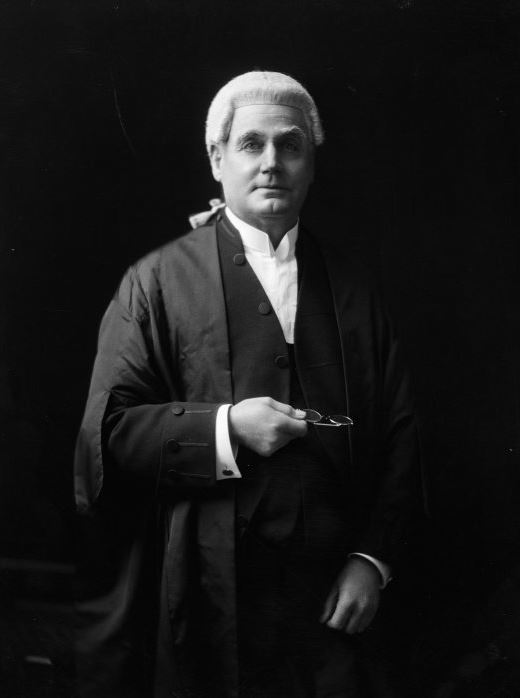
Charles Skerrett

=== Main centre leaders ===
- Mayor of Auckland – George Baildon
- Mayor of Wellington – Charles Norwood
- Mayor of Christchurch – John Archer
- Mayor of Dunedin – Harold Tapley
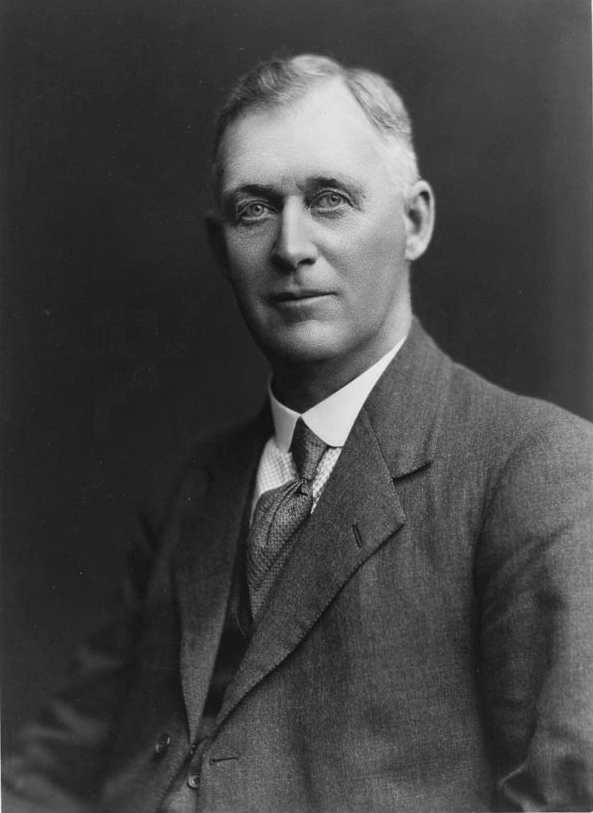
George Baildon

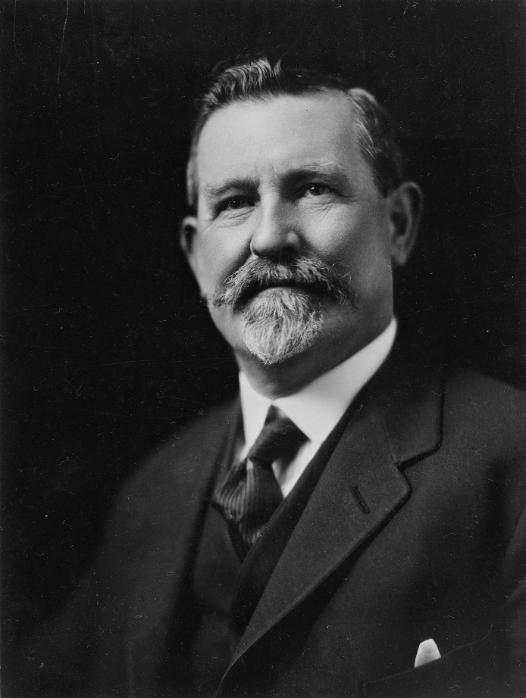
Charles Norwood

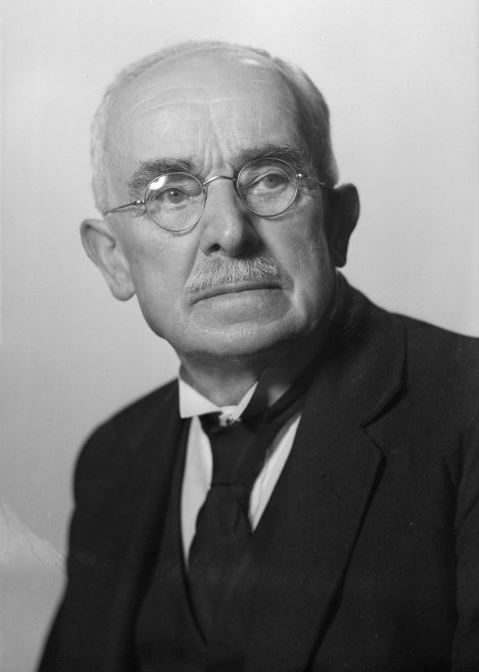
John Archer

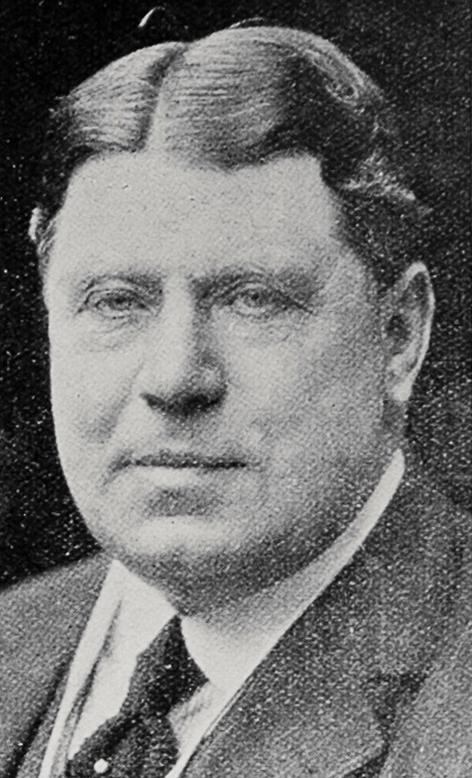
Harold Tapley

== Events ==
- 15 April – The Eden by-election is won by Rex Mason (Labour). As a result, Labour became the dominant party in opposition, with 12 seats compared to the Liberals' 11.
- 31 August – The Department of Scientific and Industrial Research is established.
- 15 November – The Balfour Declaration asserts the right of New Zealand and other dominions to exist as independent countries
- 3 December – Nine miners die in an explosion in the Dobson coal mine near Brunner
- Undated
  - Writer and adventurer Zane Grey first visits New Zealand, helping to popularise big-game fishing
  - Department of Scientific and Industrial Research is established
  - Pavlova reportedly created by a Wellington hotel chef in honour of the visit of Anna Pavlova
  - Ash eruption of Red Crater, Mount Tongariro
  - Leonard Cockayne publishes the first part of Monograph on New Zealand beech forests, which argues that the forests could be managed with a rotation of 80–120 years, but warns about overgrazing by deer

== Arts and literature ==
See 1926 in art, 1926 in literature, Category:1926 books

=== Music ===
See: 1926 in music

=== Radio ===
See: Public broadcasting in New Zealand

=== Film ===
See: 1926 in film, List of New Zealand feature films, Cinema of New Zealand, Category:1926 films

== Sport ==
=== Chess ===
- The 35th National Chess Championship is held in Dunedin, and is won by S. Crakanthorp of Sydney, his second title

=== Cricket ===
- New Zealand, along with India and the West Indies, is admitted to the Imperial Cricket Conference, increasing the number of test playing nations to six

=== Football ===
- The Chatham Cup is won by Sunnyside (Christchurch)
- Provincial league champions:
  - Auckland – Tramways
  - Canterbury – Sunnyside
  - Hawke's Bay – Whakatu
  - Nelson – Athletic
  - Otago – HSOB
  - South Canterbury – Colmoco
  - Southland – Ohai
  - Taranaki – Auroa
  - Waikato – Huntly Thistle
  - Wanganui – Woollen Mills
  - Wellington – Hospital

=== Golf ===
- The 16th New Zealand Open championship is won by Andrew Shaw after a playoff with Ernie Moss.
- The 8th National Amateur Championships are held at Miramar (men) and Balmacewan (women)
  - Men – Arthur Duncan (Wellington) (his tenth title)
  - Women – Louisa Kerr (Timaru)

=== Horse racing ===
==== Harness racing ====
- New Zealand Trotting Cup – Ahuriri (2nd win)
- Auckland Trotting Cup – Talaro

==== Thoroughbred racing ====
- New Zealand Cup – Count Cavour
- Avondale Gold Cup – Beacon Light
- Auckland Cup – Tanadees
- Wellington Cup – Enthusiasm
- New Zealand Derby – Commendation

=== Lawn bowls ===
The national outdoor lawn bowls championships are held in Dunedin.

- Men's singles champion – W. Foster (Caledonian Bowling Club)
- Men's pair champions – W. R. Todd, E. Tamlyn (skip) (St Kilda Bowling Club)
- Men's fours champions – J. D. Best, H. G. Siedeberg, F. McCullough, E. Harraway (skip) (Dunedin Bowling Club)

=== Rugby league ===
- The New Zealand national rugby league team tours Britain, losing all three tests against Great Britain and one test against Wales
- The NZRFU takes legal action to prevent the NZRL from using the name "All Blacks" for the national rugby league team

=== Rugby union ===
- 1926 New Zealand rugby union tour of New South Wales
- 1926–27 New Zealand Māori rugby union tour
- Ranfurly Shield – held by Hawkes Bay for the full season

== Births ==
=== January ===
- 3 January
  - Marie Clay, literacy researcher
  - David Spence, mathematician
- 6 January – Pat Vincent, rugby union player, coach and administrator
- 10 January – Jim Eyles, archaeologist
- 11 January – Mary Rouse, cricketer
- 19 January – Peter Cape, musician
- 20 January – Tui Uru, broadcaster, singer
- 29 January – Dennis McEldowney, writer, publisher

=== February ===
- 3 February – Guy Ngan, artist
- 7 February – Graham Latimer, Māori leader
- 13 February – Lloyd Berrell, actor
- 14 February – Sheila Natusch, naturalist, writer, illustrator
- 20 February – Ted Meuli, cricketer
- 26 February – Edwin Norton, weightlifter

=== March ===
- 5 March – Joan Mattingley, clinical chemist
- 13 March – June Litman, journalist
- 19 March – Noel Bowden, rugby union player
- 22 March – Helen Young, radio manager, arts advocate
- 24 March
  - Betty Clegg, watercolour artist
  - Rowena Jackson, ballet dancer
- 27 March – Harry Tapping, cricketer

=== April ===
- 2 April – Maurie Gordon, sport shooter
- 6 April – Don Bacon, microbiologist
- 11 April – Vivienne Boyd, community leader
- 12 April – Hoani Waititi, Māori community leader
- 14 April – Barbara Anderson, writer
- 18 April – Peter Henderson, rugby union and rugby league player, sprinter
- 22 April – Arthur Eustace, track and field athlete, coach and administrator

=== May ===
- 6 May – Colin Webster-Watson, sculptor, poet
- 9 May – Robin Cooke, jurist
- 15 May – Lyall Barry, swimmer, schoolteacher, local historian
- 19 May – Nancy Adams, botanist, botanical artist, museum curator
- 23 May – John Hollywood, cricketer
- 27 May – Gordon Leggat, cricket player and administrator

=== June ===
- 7 June – John Kennedy, Roman Catholic journalist
- 11 June – Louise Sutherland, cyclist
- 17 June – Don Rowlands, rower, rowing administrator, businessman
- 18 June – Joe Walding, politician, diplomat
- 19 June
  - Rod Coleman, motorcycle racer
  - Barrie Hutchinson, water polo player, rugby union player and administrator, politician
- 23 June – Jim Barnden, boxer
- 24 June – Graham Liggins, medical scientist
- 25 June – June Schoch, athlete
- 29 June – James K. Baxter, poet

=== July ===
- 4 July – Arnold Heine, Antarctic scientist, tramper, conservationist
- 5 July – Trevor Davey, politician
- 14 July – Patricia Woodroffe, fencer
- 18 July – Bernard Diederich, writer, journalist, historian
- 22 July – Ron Russell, politician
- 23 July – Tom O'Donnell, medical practitioner and academic
- 31 July – Don Donnithorne, architect

=== August ===
- 10 August – Edwin Carr, composer
- 17 August – Solomon Faine, microbiologist

=== September ===
- 10 September – Jack Somerville, lawn bowls player
- 11 September – Joe Schneider, rower
- 17 September – Bert Lunn, rugby union player
- 22 September – Denzil Meuli, writer, newspaper editor, Roman Catholic priest
- 29 September – Vivienne Cassie Cooper, planktologist, botanist

=== October ===
- 4 October – Phar Lap, Thoroughbred racehorse
- 10 October – Noeleen Scott, lawn bowls player
- 13 October
  - George Gair, politician, diplomat
  - Bill James, rower
- 16 October – Peter Arnold, cricket player and administrator
- 26 October – John Myles, athlete
- 28 October
  - Doug Anderson, rugby league player
  - Merv Norrish, diplomat, public servant
- 30 October – Nan Kinross, nurse and nursing academic
- 31 October – Stanley Dallas, recording engineer, radio technician

=== November ===
- 3 November – Edward Gaines, Roman Catholic bishop
- 7 November – Graeme Allwright, singer-songwriter
- 14 November – Fritz Eisenhofer, architect
- 20 November – Tom Newnham, political activist

=== December ===
- 1 December – Barry Dallas, politician
- 5 December – Derek Turnbull, athlete
- 7 December – Jack Kelly, rugby union player, schoolteacher
- 12 December
  - Maida Bryant, politician, community leader
  - Laurie Davidson, yacht designer
- 13 December – Dave Batten, athlete
- 14 December – Alan Rowe, actor
- 15 December – Ron Bailey, politician
- 18 December – Jock Aird, association footballer
- 20 December – John Holland, athlete
- 21 December – Alan Hellaby, businessman
- 23 December – Peter Iles, cricketer
- 24 December – Jimmy Edwards, rugby league player
- 25 December – Colin Chambers, swimmer
- 30 December – Richard Farrell, pianist
- 31 December – Pauline Yearbury, artist

=== Exact date unknown ===
- George Johnson, artist
- Maurice K. Smith, architect, architectural academic

== Deaths ==
=== January–March ===
- 19 January – Helen Stace, school matron (born 1850)
- 8 February – John Graham, politician (born 1843)
- 14 February – Ellen Hewett, writer (born 1843)
- 27 February – James Palmer Campbell, politician (born 1855)
- 1 March – John Barton Roy, politician (born 1854)
- 13 March – Mere Rikiriki, Māori prophet (born c.1855)
- 15 March – Charles Blomfield, artist (born 1848)
- 22 March – Louisa Baker, journalist, novelist (born 1856)

=== April–June ===
- 14 April – Hans Madsen Ries, Lutheran pastor, politician (born 1860)
- 17 April – Andrew Graham, politician (born 1843)
- 26 April – Bobby Leach, thrillseeker (born 1858)
- 1 May
  - William Geddis, journalist, politician (born 1860)
  - Isabella May, temperance worker, suffragist, dress reformer (born 1850)
- 24 May – William Morley, Methodist minister, historian (born 1842)
- 28 May – Frederick Liggins, cricketer (born 1873)
- 5 June – Elizabeth Gard'ner, home science teacher and administrator, writer (born 1858)
- 8 June – David Goldie, politician, mayor of Auckland (1898–1901) (born 1842)
- 13 June – Gottfried Lindauer, painter (born 1839)
- 15 June – William Belcher, trade union leader (born c.1860)
- 24 June – G. P. Nerli, painter (born 1860)

=== July–September ===
- 18 July – Archibald Cargill, cricketer (born 1853)
- 1 August – Sophia Anstice, dressmaker, draper, businesswoman (born 1849)
- 13 August – Te Mete Raukawa, Ngāti Ranginui leader, assessor (born c.1836)
- 18 August – Grace Neill, nurse, social reformer (born 1846)
- 3 September – John McCombie, gold prospector, mine manager (born 1849)
- 8 September – Hugh Lusk, politician (born 1837)

=== October–December ===
- 1 October – Suzanne Aubert (Sister Mary Joseph), missionary nun (born 1835)
- 9 October – Sir Arthur Myers, politician, mayor of Auckland (1905–09) (born 1868)
- 18 October – Sir James Carroll, politician (born 1857)
- 26 October – Frederick Pirani, politician (born 1858)
- 7 November – Henry Baker, cricketer (born 1904)
- 7 December – Charles Purnell, journalist, newspaper editor, writer (born 1843)
- 12 December – Jane Preshaw, nurse, midwife, hospital matron (born 1839)
- 22 December – Mina Arndt, painter (born 1885)
- 23 December – Joseph Frear, builder (born 1846)
- 28 December – Robert William Felkin, medical missionary, explorer, ceremonial magician (born 1853)

== See also ==
- List of years in New Zealand
- Timeline of New Zealand history
- History of New Zealand
- Military history of New Zealand
- Timeline of the New Zealand environment
- Timeline of New Zealand's links with Antarctica
