= Elizabeth Parsons =

Elizabeth Parsons may refer to:

- Elizabeth Parsons (singer)
- Elizabeth Parsons (artist) (1831–1897)
- Liz Parsons (1945–2020), Welsh athlete
- Elizabeth Parsons, perpetrator of the Cock Lane ghost scam

== See also ==
- Elizabeth Parson, British hymn writer
