= Liggins =

Liggins is a surname. Notable people with this surname include:

- DeAndre Liggins (born 1988), American basketball player
- Ethel Liggins (1886–1970), British pianist, also known by her stage name Ethel Leginska
- Frederick Liggins (1873–1926), New Zealand cricketer
- Graham Liggins (1926–2010), New Zealand medical scientist
- Granville Liggins (born 1946), American American football player
- Jamalcolm Liggins (born 1996), American football player
- Jimmy Liggins (1918–1983), American R&B guitarist
- Joe Liggins (1916–1987), American R&B, jazz and blues pianist
- John Liggins (1829–1912), English episcopalian missionary
- John Liggins (1906–1976), English footballer
