= Joseph Frear =

Joseph Frear may refer to:

- J. Allen Frear Jr. (1903–1993), American businessman and politician
- Joseph Frear (builder) (1846–1926), New Zealand builder and businessman
