= Alan Wilkinson =

Alan Wilkinson may refer to:

- Alan Wilkinson (footballer) (1924–2015), New Zealand former footballer
- Alan Wilkinson (RAF officer) (1891–1972), British World War I flying ace
- Alan Wilkinson (speedway rider) (1949–2020), English speedway rider
