= Mary Dawson =

Mary Dawson may refer to:

- Mary R. Dawson (1931–2020), American paleontologist
- Mary Dawson (civil servant) (1942–2023), Canadian civil servant
- Mary Cardwell Dawson (1894–1962), African-American musician and teacher
- Mary Elizabeth Dawson (1833–1924), New Zealand servant, farmer, environmentalist and nurse
- Mary Dawson, Countess of Dartrey (1854–1939), British peer
- Mademoiselle Fifi (dancer) (Mary Elizabeth Dawson, 1890–1982), American dancer
