= Barbara Hale (librarian) =

Australian librarian

- Born: Barbara Mary Hale; 5 April 1924; New Zealand
- Died: 4 June 2013 (aged 89); Nedlands, Western Australia, Australia
- Education: Canterbury University College; University of Sheffield
- Occupation: Librarian
- Employer: University of Western Australia

Barbara Mary Hale (5 April 1924 – 4 June 2013) was an Australian librarian. She was the first woman to be elected by academics to the senate of the University of Western Australia.

== Early life and education ==
Hale was born on 5 April 1924 in New Zealand to Frederick and Bertha Hale. She completed a Master of Arts degree majoring in English at Canterbury University College in Christchurch, graduating in 1947. Later she graduated from the University of Sheffield with a Master's in librarianship in 1968 with her thesis, A study of the subject bibliography of the social sciences and humanities. Her thesis was published as a book by Pergamon Press in 1970.

== Career ==
Hale was employed by the University of Western Australia (UWA) from 1961. She was promoted to the position of deputy university librarian in 1966 and served in that role until she retired in 1984. During her tenure, she was the first woman to be elected by academics to the senate of the UWA.

During her retirement Hale dedicated herself to the Australian Federation of University Women (Australian Graduate Women since 2009), serving as president from 1985 to 1988. Her involvement with the Western Australian branch included as president, secretary and membership convenor. During this time she founded a trust to administer bursaries for postgraduate students.

In addition, Hale spent ten years as vice-president of the Friends of the UWA Library. She was made an Honorary Fellow of St Catherine's College in 2003 in recognition of her service to its council from 1977 to 1999.

== Death and legacy ==
Hale died on 4 June 2013 at Sir Charles Gairdner Hospital, Nedlands. Her funeral was held at Christ Church, Claremont, prior to cremation.

The Barbara Hale Fellowship was established by Australian Graduate Women to support Australian women in the second or further years of their PhD. As of 2023, two Fellowships are offered.
