= Joseph Borton =

New Zealand cricketer

Personal information
- Full name: Joseph Barnes Borton
- Born: 1832; Warwickshire, England
- Died: 24 February 1924 (aged 91); Dunedin, New Zealand
- Batting: Left-handed
- Bowling: Left-arm medium

Domestic team information
- Years: Team
- 1864/65–1865/66: Otago

Career statistics
Competition	First-class
Matches	2
Runs scored	5
Batting average	1.25
100s/50s	0/0
Top score	5
Balls bowled	188
Wickets	5
Bowling average	10.80
5 wickets in innings	0
10 wickets in match	0
Best bowling	3/22
Catches/stumpings	2/0
- Source: CricketArchive, 23 January 2021

Joseph Barnes Borton (1832 – 24 February 1924) was a New Zealand goldfields warden and cricketer. Along with William Gilbert Rees, Gibson Turton, James Fulton, and Herbert Kissling, he is credited with reviving interest in cricket in Otago in the 1860s.

== Life and career ==
Borton was born in England and moved to New Zealand in 1854. He was a miner at Waitahuna in the Otago goldfields in the early 1860s.

In February 1864, Borton was one of the umpires for the match played at the Recreation Reserve, Dunedin, between the touring English cricket team and an Otago team of 22 players. Borton played in two first-class matches for Otago in 1865 and 1866. The matches Borton played in between Otago and Canterbury are regarded as the second and third games of first-class cricket within New Zealand, and the first games with teams composed entirely of local players. An obituary of Borton in The Press in 1924 suggests that the results of these matches were determined as much by the travelling conditions for the visiting team as by cricketing merit: the Canterbury side that lost to Borton's Otago team in 1866 had taken two days to travel by ship from Christchurch to Dunedin and the 1924 newspaper quotes a contemporary report that, on part of the journey, "it was found that the steamer, though going full steam ahead, had actually been driven some miles backwards". Borton was a left-arm bowler and left-handed batsman.

Borton was appointed as a warden and resident magistrate in the Otago Gold Fields district, and receiver of gold revenue at Roxburgh in 1870, having previously served as gold receiver at the Hamilton diggings near Ranfurly. He later served on the Tuapeka county council, representing the Clarks Riding district: he was first elected in December 1881, an earlier election having resulted in a dead-heat. He resigned as a justice of the peace in 1890. In 1894, Borton was elected as one of eight members of the licensing committee for the Caversham licensing district in Dunedin. In later years he worked for the Public Works Department in Dunedin.

Borton married Eleanor Conroy at Cottenham, in Central Otago, in April 1881. He died at his home in Dunedin on 24 February 1924, aged 91. He was buried at the Dunedin Northern Cemetery, with the Reverend Ernest Blamires, known as "The Cricketing Cleric", officiating.
