= Arthur Lomas =

New Zealand cricketer

Personal information
- Full name: Arthur Leslie Lomas
- Born: 13 February 1895; Dunedin, Otago, New Zealand
- Died: 11 February 1924 (aged 28); Wellington, New Zealand

Domestic team information
- Years: Team
- 1919/20: Otago
- Source: ESPNcricinfo, 15 May 2016

Arthur Leslie Lomas (13 February 1895 – 11 February 1924) was a New Zealand cricketer. He played one first-class match for Otago during the 1919–20 season.

Lomas was born at Dunedin in 1895 and worked as a draftsman and architect. His only first-class match came against Southland in March 1920. Lomas scored 39 runs in his first innings and two in his second.

Whilst serving in France with the New Zealand Field Artillery during the First World War, Lomas was gassed, which permanently damaged his health and eventually caused his death at the age in 1924 at the age of 28. At the time of his death he was working for the Lands and Survey Department in Wellington.
