= John Hollywood =

New Zealand cricketer

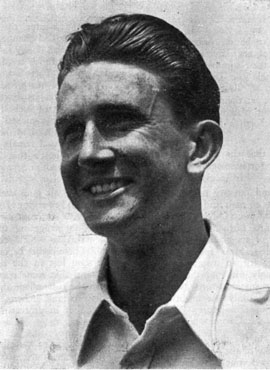

Personal information
- Full name: John Edgar Hollywood
- Born: 23 May 1926; Auckland, New Zealand
- Died: 16 July 1952 (aged 26); Sydney, Australia
- Batting: Right-handed
- Bowling: Right-arm fast-medium

Domestic team information
- Years: Team
- 1947/48–1949/50: Auckland

Career statistics
Competition	First-class
Matches	7
Runs scored	41
Batting average	10.25
100s/50s	0/0
Top score	17*
Balls bowled	1,832
Wickets	25
Bowling average	28.88
5 wickets in innings	0
10 wickets in match	0
Best bowling	4/86
Catches/stumpings	3/–
- Source: Cricinfo, 10 February 2018

John Edgar Hollywood (23 May 1926 – 16 July 1952) was a New Zealand cricketer. He played seven first-class matches for Auckland between 1947 and 1950. He went to the University of Sydney to study veterinary medicine, but died there in July 1952 during his third year. His death was recorded as suicide.
