= Fritz Eisenhofer =

New Zealand architect (1926–2023)

Fritz Eisenhofer ONZM FNZIA
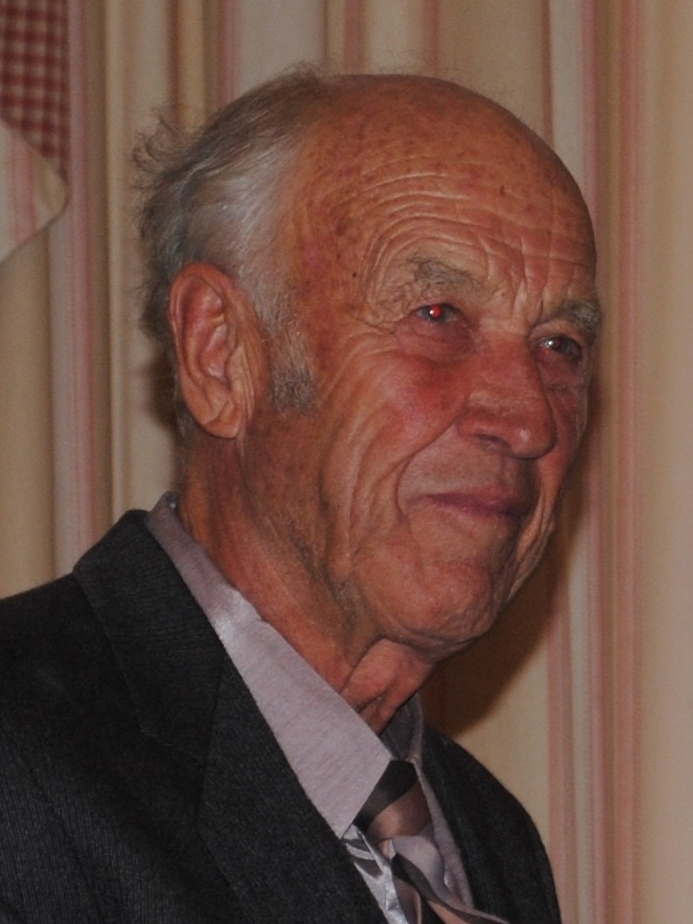
- Eisenhofer in 2010
- Born: Friedrich Eisenhofer; 14 November 1926; Spittal an der Drau, Austria
- Died: 27 July 2023 (aged 96); Peka Peka, New Zealand
- Citizenship: New Zealander
- Education: Academy of Fine Arts Vienna
- Occupation: Architect
- Spouse: Helen Rickard (m. 1955)
- Practice: Winkler and Eisenhofer
- Design: Suzy's Coffee Lounge

Friedrich Eisenhofer ONZM (14 November 1926 – 27 July 2023) was a New Zealand modernist architect based in Waikanae.

== Biography ==
Eisenhofer was born in the Austrian town of Spittal an der Drau on 14 November 1926, and studied architecture at the Kunstakademie in Vienna after the Second World War.

Eisenhofer emigrated to New Zealand in 1953 in a group of almost 200 skilled Austrian tradesmen contracted to build 500 pre-cut Austrian state houses in Tītahi Bay (Porirua).[2] After the completion of the project, Eisenhofer gained New Zealand residency and began working at the Department of Housing in Wellington. In the late 1950s he went into partnership with fellow Austrian architect Erwin Winkler, setting up practice at 108 Cuba Street, Wellington. Their style adhered to the principles of the modern movement, heavily influenced by architects such as Ludwig Mies van der Rohe and Charles Eames.[3]

Eisenhofer married Helen Rickard in 1955, and the couple had three children. Eisenhofer became a naturalised New Zealander in 1960.

Eisenhofer has been described as a visionary architect who practised "uncompromised high-style modernism". He is noted for his stylish, modern design in 1964 of Suzy's Coffee Lounge in Willis Street, Wellington, which is the subject of the 1967 oil-on-hardboard painting, At Suzy's Coffee Lounge, by Rita Angus.

For much of his career, Eisenhofer's work has focused on solar gain and a relationship to the surrounding landscape. His own home was dome-shaped, built four metres underground and made from ferro-cement. The large north-facing glass wall regulates the temperature by slowly heating the ground floor through summer. This heat is then gradually released during winter. Inside, the home has a swimming-pool and a tropical garden.

In the 2010 New Year Honours, Eisenhofer was appointed an Officer of the New Zealand Order of Merit for services to architecture.

Eisenhofer died at his home at Peka Peka on 27 July 2023, at the age of 96. His wife, Helen Eisenhofer, died in October 2024.
