= Wanda Cowley =

New Zealand writer (1924–2017)

Wanda McKenzie Cowley (7 September 1924 – 26 September 2017) was a New Zealand children's writer.

== Biography ==
Cowley was born in Auckland in 1924. She studied at the University of Auckland, completing a bachelor of arts degree and a diploma in education.

Cowley died on 26 September 2017, at the age of 93. Her ashes were buried at Onetangi Cemetery on Waiheke Island.

=== Publications ===
- Biddy Alone (1988)
- Trespassers (Mallinson Rendel Publishers, 1991)
- Biddy and the Night Birds (Mallinson Rendel Publishers, 1994)
- Scrimshaw Secret (2007)
