= Peggy Hay =

New Zealand designer

- Born: Beatrice Margaret Hay; 23 September 1924; Waimate, New Zealand
- Died: 4 October 2016 (aged 92); Wellington, New Zealand
- Other names: Peggy Proffitt
- Occupation: Designer
- Spouse: Alan Proffitt (m. 1950; died 2014)

Beatrice Margaret Proffitt (née Hay; 23 September 1924 – 4 October 2016) was a New Zealand designer. Examples of her work are held in the permanent collection of Museum of New Zealand Te Papa Tongarewa.

== Biography ==
Hay was born in Waimate, South Canterbury, and grew up on a farm. She studied craft and design at the Canterbury College School of Art in Christchurch from 1943 to 1948; one of her tutors was Francis Shurrock, a sculptor and a leading figure in the Arts and Crafts movement in New Zealand. She also studied metal artwork and jewellery design and making with Johnny Johnstone.

Hay designed handblocked wallpaper and fabric. Pieces of her wallpapers and garments made from her fabric are held at the Museum of New Zealand Te Papa Tongarewa.

In 1950, at Knox Church, Waimate, Hay married Alan Thomas Proffitt, a civil engineer who later oversaw the design and construction of the Wellington Urban Motorway and construction of the Terrace Tunnel. The couple had five children. Peggy Proffitt died in Wellington on 4 October 2016, having been predeceased by her husband in 2014.
