= Rex Challies =

New Zealand cricketer

Personal information
- Full name: Rex Sinclair Challies
- Born: 15 September 1924; Nelson, New Zealand
- Died: 9 August 2003 (aged 78); Nelson, New Zealand
- Batting: Right-handed
- Bowling: Leg break, googly
- Role: Bowler

Domestic team information
- Years: Team
- 1946/47–1947/48: Wellington
- 1951/52–1953/54: Central Districts
- 1954/55–1955/56: Wellington
- FC debut: 31 January 1947 Wellington v Otago
- Last FC: 20 January 1956 Wellington v Otago

Career statistics
Competition	First-class
Matches	17
Runs scored	98
Batting average	6.53
100s/50s	0/0
Top score	15
Balls bowled	3,006
Wickets	45
Bowling average	37.08
5 wickets in innings	2
10 wickets in match	0
Best bowling	6/112
Catches/stumpings	6/–
- Source: CricInfo, 14 July 2009

Rex Sinclair Challies (15 September 1924 – 9 August 2003) was a New Zealand cricketer for Central Districts and Wellington between 1947 and 1956. He played a total of 17 first class cricket matches. A legbreak spin-bowler, he appeared in 17 first class cricket matches, taking 45 wickets at an average of 37.08. He also contributed 98 runs as a lower order batsman.

Challies was born and died in Nelson, where he was regarded as "something of a character". He was educated at Nelson College from 1934 to 1943, and represented Nelson in the Hawke Cup from 1945–46 to 1959–60.

A leg-break and googly bowler who delivered at just under medium pace, Challies played for Wellington in the 1946–47 and 1947–48 seasons. When the Central Districts team was formed, he played for them from 1951–52 to 1953–54, before returning to Wellington for the 1954–55 and 1955–56 seasons. For Central Districts he took 3 for 67 and 5 for 52 against Wellington in his only match of the 1952–53 season. His best bowling figures of 6 for 112, came in his second-last match, against Auckland, in 1955–56.
