= Atareta Kawana Ropiha Mere Rikiriki =

New Zealand prophet (1855–1926)

Atareta Kawana Ropiha Mere Rikiriki (1855 – 13 March 1926), known as Mere Rikiriki, was a New Zealand prophet. Of Māori descent, she identified with the Ngāti Apa iwi. She was born in New Zealand in about 1855.
