= Jack McNab (rugby union, born 1924) =

New Zealand rugby union player

- Born: John Ronald McNab; 26 March 1924 Owaka, New Zealand
- Died: 23 May 2009 (aged 85) Dunedin, New Zealand
- Height: 1.83 m (6 ft 0 in)
- Weight: 89 kg (196 lb)
- School: Owaka District High School

Rugby union career
- Position: Loose forward
Provincial / State sides
Years	Team	Apps	(Points)
1945–1953	Otago		
International career
Years	Team	Apps	(Points)
1949–1950	New Zealand	6	(0)

John Ronald McNab (26 March 1924 – 23 May 2009) was a New Zealand rugby union player. A loose forward, McNab represented Otago at a provincial level, and was a member of the New Zealand national side, the All Blacks, in 1949 and 1950, including on their 1949 tour of South Africa. He played 17 matches for the All Blacks including six internationals.

Later, McNab coached Otago Country and South Otago Colts teams. He served as president of the South Otago sub-union from 1976 to 1977, and was president of the Otago Rugby Football Union from 1980 to 1981.

McNab's memoirs, Owaka Jack, written by his daughter, Shirley Deuchrass, were published in 2008. McNab died in Dunedin on 23 May 2009, aged 85. At the time of his death, he was the oldest living All Black from Otago.
