= Walter Mason =

New Zealand cricketer

Personal information
- Full name: Walter Finch Mason
- Born: 27 December 1847; Yateley, Hampshire, England
- Died: 18 October 1924 (aged 76); Onerahi, New Zealand

Domestic team information
- Years: Team
- 1873–1876: Wellington

Career statistics
Competition	FC
Matches	3
Runs scored	29
Batting average	5.80
100s/50s	0/0
Top score	13
Balls bowled	0
Wickets	0
Bowling average	-
5 wickets in innings	0
10 wickets in match	0
Best bowling	-
Catches/stumpings	1/0
- Source: Cricket Archive, 6 November 2009

Walter Finch Mason (27 December 1847 – 18 October 1924) was a New Zealand cricketer who made five appearances, three of them first class appearances, for Wellington between 1873 and 1876. He made a duck on debut against Nelson on 27 December 1872; four and two against Hawke's Bay on 17 January 1874; and then 12 and zero in his first class debut on 17 March.
