= Stanley Dallas =

New Zealand recording engineer and radio technician

Stanley Dallas (31 October 1926 – 21 November 1997) was a New Zealand recording engineer and radio technician. He was born in Glasgow, Lanarkshire, Scotland on 31 October 1926.
