= Joseph Pabst =

New Zealand cricketer and physician (1870–1924)

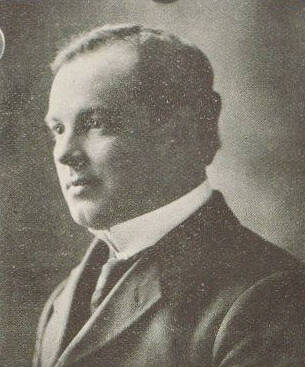
- Pabst in 1903

Personal information
- Full name: Joseph Charles Pabst
- Born: 1870; Eaglehawk, Victoria, Australia
- Died: 19 May 1924 (aged 53–54); Wellington, New Zealand
- Batting: Right-handed
- Role: Batsman, occasional wicket-keeper

Domestic team information
- Years: Team
- 1894/95–1897/98: Auckland

Career statistics
Competition	First-class
Matches	5
Runs scored	71
Batting average	8.87
100s/50s	0/0
Top score	20
Balls bowled	12
Wickets	0
Bowling average	–
5 wickets in innings	–
10 wickets in match	–
Best bowling	–
Catches/stumpings	5/1
- Source: Cricinfo, 22 September 2024

Joseph Charles Pabst (1870 – 19 May 1924) was a New Zealand cricketer and doctor. He played five first-class matches for Auckland between 1894 and 1898, and practised as a doctor in Auckland and Wellington.

== Life and career ==
Pabst's father was a German who migrated to Australia in 1860 and settled on the Bendigo goldfields, where he established a business as a butcher. Pabst was one of four children, two boys and two girls. He studied medicine at the University of Melbourne, graduating as a Bachelor of Medicine in 1892, was awarded first-class honours in 1893, when he was acting resident surgeon at the Melbourne Women's Hospital, and graduated as a Doctor of Medicine in 1897. He took up a position as house physician at Auckland Hospital in September 1894.

Pabst played cricket as a batsman and occasional wicket-keeper. Playing for the Gordon club in senior Auckland cricket, he was one of the leading batsmen in the competition in 1894–95. He made his first-class cricket debut in January 1895, captaining Auckland to victory over the touring Fijians.

Pabst married Frederica Isabel Peacocke in Auckland in August 1901. They moved to Wellington in 1922, where he went into private practice. He injured himself when he slipped on the stairs outside his surgery and died a few weeks later in May 1924, leaving a widow and several daughters.
