= Warren Keith Sinclair =

New Zealand medical researcher

- Born: March 9, 1924; Dunedin, New Zealand
- Died: May 14, 2014 (aged 90); Southern California, US
- Citizenship: United States
- Education: Otago Boys’ High School, 1941; University of Otago, BSc, 1944; University of Otago, MS in physics, 1945; University of London, PhD in physics, 1950
- Known for: work on Relative Biological Effectiveness
- Spouse: Elizabeth (Joy) Warren
- Children: 2
- Awards: Coolidge Award, 1986; Failla Lecture, 1987; H.M Parker Lecture, 1992; L.S. Taylor Lecture, 1993; National Sigma Xi Lecturer, 1992 to 1994
- Scientific career
- Workplaces: Dunedin Hospital, Dunedin, New Zealand; Royal Cancer Hospital, Landon, England; M.D. Anderson Hospital, Houston, Texas; Argonne National Laboratory; University of Chicago; National Council on Radiation Protection and Measurements
- Patrons: Earnest Marsden; Dr. Peter Jerram, radiotherapist
- Doctoral advisor: Professor William Valentine (Val) Mayneord; Royal Cancer Hospital
- Other academic advisors: Earnest Marsden

Warren Keith Sinclair (9 March 1924 – 14 May 2014) was an international expert in radiation protection, science and medicine.
