= John McCombie =

New Zealand gold prospector, miner, and mine manager

- Born: 15 June 1849; Onehunga, Auckland, New Zealand
- Died: 3 September 1926 (aged 77)
- Occupations: Gold prospector, miner, mine manager
- Known for: Mining and gold prospecting in New Zealand

John McCombie (15 June 1849 – 3 September 1926) was a New Zealand gold prospector and miner, mine manager. He was born in Onehunga, Auckland, New Zealand, on 15 June 1849.
