= Reg Singer =

New Zealand footballer

Personal information
- Full name: Reginald John Singer
- Date of birth: 14 February 1924
- Place of birth: New Zealand
- Date of death: 14 December 2001 (aged 77)

Senior career*
Years	Team	Apps	(Gls)
- Stop Out

International career
1948	New Zealand	1	(0)
- * Club domestic league appearances and goals

Reginald John Singer (14 February 1924 – 14 December 2001) was a football (soccer) player who represented New Zealand at international level.

Singer made a solitary official international appearance for the All Whites in a 1–8 loss to Australia on 11 September 1948.
