= James Palmer Campbell =

New Zealand politician

James Palmer Campbell (1855 – 27 February 1926) was a member of the New Zealand Legislative Council from 2 September 1921 to 27 February 1926, when he died. He was appointed by the Reform Government.

He was from Auckland.
