= Henry Hill (New Zealand cricketer) =

New Zealand cricketer

Henry Hill (13 July 1845 – 6 January 1924) was a Welsh-born New Zealand cricketer who played for Canterbury. He was born in Newport and died in Christchurch.

Hill made a single first-class appearance for the team, during the 1873–74 season, against Otago. From the upper-middle order, he scored a duck in both innings in which he batted, and took figures of 0–2 from two overs of bowling.
