= Hector Wilson =

NZ international rugby union player

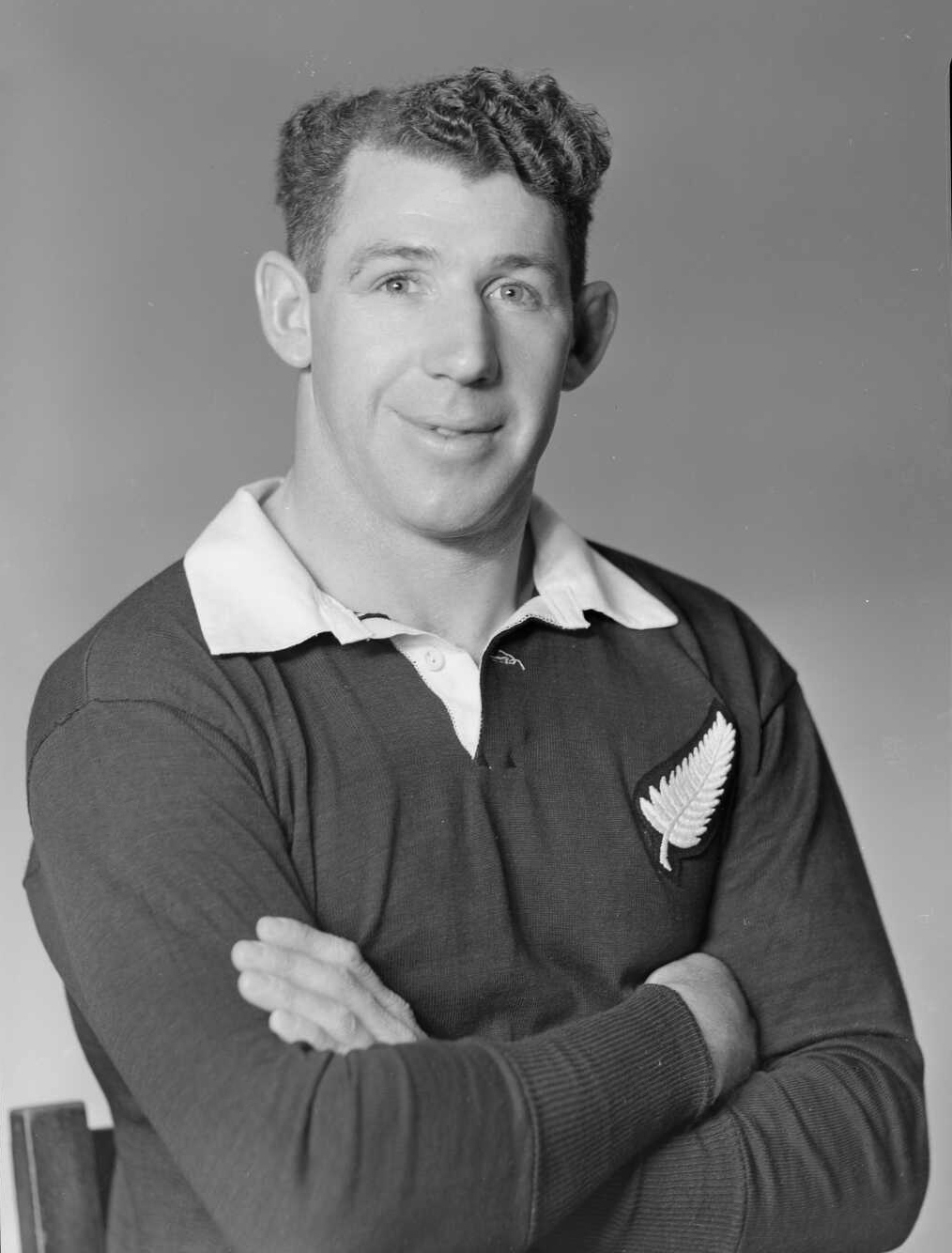
- Wilson in 1948
- Born: Hector William Ryan; 27 January 1921 Beaumont, New Zealand
- Died: 15 May 2004 (aged 80) Clyde, New Zealand
- Height: 1.80 m (5 ft 11 in)
- Weight: 94 kg (207 lb)

Rugby union career
- Position: Prop
Provincial / State sides
Years	Team	Apps	(Points)
1948–51	Otago		
International career
Years	Team	Apps	(Points)
1949–51	New Zealand	5	(3)

Hector William Ryan (27 January 1921 – 15 May 2004) was a New Zealand rugby union player. A prop, Wilson represented Otago at a provincial level, and was a member of the New Zealand national side, the All Blacks, from 1949 to 1951. He played 13 matches for the All Blacks including five internationals.

After his parents divorced in 1927, Hector adopted his new stepfather's name after his mother married John Roland Wilson in 1939
