= Leonard Kent (cricketer) =

New Zealand cricketer

Len Kent
Personal information
- Full name: Leonard Alfred Walter Kent
- Born: 26 December 1924; Auckland, New Zealand
- Died: 17 December 2014 (aged 89); Auckland, New Zealand
- Batting: Left-handed
- Role: Wicket-keeper

Domestic team information
- Years: Team
- 1943/44–1951/52: Auckland

Career statistics
Competition	First-class
Matches	32
Runs scored	651
Batting average	13.85
100s/50s	0/1
Top score	91
Catches/stumpings	49/32
- Source: ESPNcricinfo, 2 July 2018

Leonard Alfred Walter Kent (26 December 1924 – 17 December 2014) was a New Zealand cricketer. He played 32 first-class matches for Auckland between 1943 and 1952.

Playing for Auckland against Wellington in 1944–45 he made six stumpings, all off the leg-spin bowling of Ces Burke, and also took two catches, one off Burke. He was considered one of New Zealand's best young wicketkeepers in 1948, but never achieved national selection.
