= Helen McRae Stace =

New Zealand homemaker and school matron

Helen McRae Stace (née Mowat, 26 October 1850 – 19 January 1926) was a notable New Zealand homemaker and school matron. She was born in Awatere valley, Marlborough, New Zealand, in 1850.
