= Henry Baker (cricketer) =

Australian-born New Zealand cricketer

Personal information
- Full name: Henry Stephen Baker
- Born: 26 December 1904; Melbourne, Victoria, Australia
- Died: 7 November 1926 (aged 21); Dunedin, Otago, New Zealand

Domestic team information
- Years: Team
- 1925/26: Otago
- Only FC: 25 December 1925 Otago v Canterbury
- Source: CricInfo, 1 January 2022

Henry Stephen Baker (26 December 1904 – 7 November 1926) was an Australian-born cricketer who played a single first-class cricket match in New Zealand for Otago.

Baker was born at Melbourne in Victoria in 1904. He played in his only known cricket match during the 1925/26 season, against Canterbury. He scored a total of two runs in the match. Baker also played rugby union and was described as a "fine all-round athlete" and as a "prominent member of the Dunedin Football Club".

Baker lived in the Dunedin suburb of Kensington, and worked as a factory hand and as a clerk. He died in November 1926 at the age of 21, less than 12 months after his only first-class appearance. He drowned while swimming off Tomahawk beach in Dunedin.
