= Daniel Claffey =

New Zealand cricketer

Dan Claffey
Personal information
- Full name: Daniel Patrick Claffey
- Born: 28 November 1869; Dunedin, Otago, New Zealand
- Died: 2 February 1924 (aged 54); Dunedin, Otago New Zealand
- Bowling: Right-arm fast

Domestic team information
- Years: Team
- 1888/89–1889/90: Otago
- Source: ESPNcricinfo, 7 May 2016

Daniel Patrick Claffey (28 November 1869 – 2 February 1924) was a New Zealand sportsman. He played two first-class cricket matches for Otago, one in each of the 1888–89 and 1889–90 seasons, and played provincial rugby union for the Otago team.

Claffey was born at Dunedin in 1869. He played club cricket for Wanderers, Dunedin and Privateers, and made his first-class debut for Otago in January 1889 in a match at Lancaster Park against Canterbury, the only first-class match Otago played during the 1888–89 season. Claffey opened the bowling and took one wicket―his only first-class wicket―as Otago lost by an innings. His second match came in the following season, a December 1889 fixture against Auckland at the Caledonian Ground in Dunedin. An obituary recorded that although he was a "good cricketer", he "did not do anything remarkable" in his two representative matches.

Better known locally as a rugby player, Claffey played as a "renowned" fullback for the Kaikorai club and was well known for his kicking ability. He played for Otago against both Canterbury and Southland in 1890. The Otago Witness reported that he "kicked splendidly" against Canterbury but that his handling was problematic, although the paper's correspondent was of the opinion that with experience he had the potential to "develop into a first-class fullback".

Claffey died at Dunedin in 1924 aged 54 after a "lingering" illness.
