= Australian Graduate Women =

Organization

Australian Graduate Women (AGW), founded in 1922, is the national organisation for Graduate Women in Australia. Previously known as the Australian Federation of University Women until 2009 and the Australian Federation of Graduate Women until April 2019, AGW is affiliated with Graduate Women International in Geneva.

== Activities ==
The organisation lobbies the Federal Government on issues pertaining to women in academia. It also organises triennial conferences and awards several fellowships for post-graduate study. It has campaigned for equal pay and employment opportunities for female academics and against gender discrimination in education.
