= Louise Sutherland =

New Zealand cyclist (1926–1994)

Louise Juliet Sutherland QSM (11 June 1926 – 24 December 1994) was a New Zealand cyclist.

== Biography ==
Born in Dunedin, New Zealand, she was the eldest of five sisters. At the age of 19, having grown-up with cycling as a primary means of transport, she moved to Oamaru Hospital to begin four years of nursing training. To visit her parents in Dunedin required a 7-hour, 100-kilometre ride; this was the beginning of her taste for long-distance cycling adventures. Louise eventually cycled 60,000 kilometres through 54 countries, in New Zealand and from Calais to Bombay, Vancouver to Peru.

In 1945, the Otago Daily Times reported that Louise Sutherland had completed a 700 kilometres ride from Dunedin to Invercargill to visit an uncle and also cycled back, all at the beginning of a bitter Southland winter. By the age of 21, Louise Sutherland was enjoying regular cycling holidays, such as a 6-day ‘Mount Cook trip’.

In 1949, working as a nurse in London, Louise set off to cycle to Land's End, Cornwall. However, this journey was only the inspiration for a much bigger and longer trip through Europe, Israel, Turkey, Lebanon, Iraq and into India. All of this was done on a bike bought in a jumble sale for £2.10s., towing a 2-wheeled trailer. She would mail reports of her travels to the Dominion Post. In 1953, she returned to New Zealand for her father's funeral. A year later, she resolved to be "the first girl to cycle around the world alone". In 1954, she traveled to Vancouver to start cycling across North America. She had a chance encounter with a Canadian journalist who wrote about her and she received constant requests for paid TV and newspaper interviews that helped pay her expenses. In Toronto, she was given a new bike for her trip from Raleigh (1950s and 1960s). She arrived in New York with $25 in her pocket. She earned $200 on the "Strike it Rich" TV show and then she took a ship to London, where her story was picked up by newspapers.

For 4 months, she cycled through Scandinavia and above the arctic circle, becoming the first cyclist to reach Nordkapp. She returned to London and married Patrick Drew Andrew. She appeared on the TV Show "to tell the truth" and gave 900 lectures over 6 years, about her travels. She wrote and self-published "I follow the Wind" during this time. By 1983, it has sold over 7,000 copies. She became the first person to cycle behind the Iron Curtain since the Second World War.

In 1964, her marriage failed and she returned to New Zealand and became the first person to cycle across Haast Pass on the newly created road and in 1969, became the first person to cycle through the Greenstone Valley.

In 1970, she returned to London via the Trans-Siberian railway. She made a 3.5 month cycling trip around Iceland and in London, was giving lectures about her cycling trips.

In 1974, she had a new trailer and set off to Lima, Peru and cycled over the Andes, becoming the first woman to cycle over the Abra de Anticona pass. She reached the San Francisco Hospital in the Apurimac Valley the Amazon jungle, and worked there as a nurse for 18 months. She returned to New Zealand in 1975 after contracting hepatitis. In New Zealand she raised $10,000 for the Amazon Trust, a London based organisation that funded medical projects in the Amazon. She raised funds and obtained New Zealand government support to buy a Hamilton Jet ambulance boat for the San Francisco hospital.

In the, 1970's Peugeot gave her a bike.

In 1978, despite still knowing relatively little about bicycle mechanics, even how to fix a puncture, Louise Sutherland set out alone on a 4,400 km ride through the Amazon jungle. The self-planned trip was far rougher than any Tour de France, and something one Brazilian official publicly considered "Quite impossible!" especially considering that much of the Trans-Amazon Highway had only recently been completed. She was the first person to cycle the route and wrote a book about her trip, aptly titled, The Impossible Ride.

During her cycling travels and nursing career, Louise Sutherland demonstrated a belief in the best of human nature, especially of the indigenous peoples she met. She spent many years raising money for medical assistance for people living in the Amazon Rainforest and these efforts were officially recognised. In 1991 Louise Sutherland became the first foreigner to receive the Golden Fish Award for services to Brazil, and in the 1993 Queen's Birthday Honours she was awarded the Queen's Service Medal for her efforts in raising aid for people in Peru and Brazil.

Louise Sutherland died unexpectedly from a brain aneurysm on Christmas Eve, 1994 at the age of 68.
