= Te Mete Raukawa =

Te Mete Raukawa (1836 – 13 August 1926) was a New Zealand tribal leader, assessor and sportsman. Of Māori descent, he identified with the Ngāti Ranginui iwi. He was born in Bethlehem, Bay of Plenty, New Zealand, in about 1836.
