= William Gardiner (cricketer) =

New Zealand cricketer

Personal information
- Born: 14 July 1864; Auckland, New Zealand
- Died: 27 January 1924 (aged 59); Wellington, New Zealand
- Role: Batsman

Domestic team information
- Years: Team
- 1889/90–1893/94: Auckland
- 1895/96: Wellington

Career statistics
Competition	First-class
Matches	13
Runs scored	383
Batting average	17.40
100s/50s	0/2
Top score	61
Catches/stumpings	6/–
- Source: Cricinfo, 24 February 2021

William Gardiner (14 July 1864 – 27 January 1924) was a New Zealand cricketer. He played first-class cricket for Auckland and Wellington between 1882 and 1896.

In the 1892–93 season Gardiner was regarded as the best batsman in Auckland and "one of the best in the colony", as well as a reliable fieldsman. His highest first-class score was 61, the only fifty in the match, when Auckland beat Canterbury in 1891–92. He top-scored for Wellington with 59 in the drawn match against Hawke's Bay in 1895–96, his last first-class match.

Gardiner also played rugby for Auckland in the 1880s until a shoulder injury curtailed his career. He worked as a builder and contractor, his company being noted for building bridges and wharfs. He and his wife Catherine had one son, Norman. Gardiner died in Wellington aged 59 after a severe illness.
