= Noel Bowden =

- Born: Noel James Gordon Bowden; 19 March 1926 Whangārei, New Zealand
- Died: 9 October 2009 (aged 83) Albany, New Zealand
- School: Auckland Grammar School
- Occupation: Schoolteacher

Rugby union career
- Position: Fullback
Amateur team(s)
Years	Team	Apps	(Points)
-	West of Scotland		
Provincial / State sides
Years	Team	Apps	(Points)
1947, 1954	Auckland		
- Waikato
1950–1953	Taranaki		
–	Glasgow District		
International career
Years	Team	Apps	(Points)
1952	New Zealand	1	(3)

Noel James Gordon Bowden (19 March 1926 – 9 October 2009) was a New Zealand rugby union player. A full-back, Bowden represented Auckland, Waikato, and Taranaki at a provincial level. He played one match for the New Zealand national side, the All Blacks, a test against the touring Australian team in 1952, in which he kicked one penalty goal.

He also played in Scotland, turning out for West of Scotland. He was selected and played for Glasgow District in the Scottish Inter-District Championship. He later became a lecturer in physical education at the North Shore College of Education. He was a prominent senior rugby coach in Auckland club rugby, coaching the Teachers Rugby Club for a number of years.
