= Archibald Cargill =

New Zealand cricketer

Personal information
- Born: 20 August 1853; Melbourne, Australia
- Died: 18 July 1926 (aged 72); Porirua, New Zealand

Domestic team information
- Years: Team
- 1876/77–1883/84: Otago
- Source: CricInfo, 6 May 2016

Archibald Cargill (20 August 1853 – 18 July 1926) was a New Zealand cricketer. He played four first-class matches for Otago between the 1876–77 and 1883–84 seasons.

Cargill was born at Melbourne in Victoria, Australia in 1853. He married in 1883. He worked as an accountant with the National Insurance Company in Dunedin for 21 years before being dismissed in 1898 and prosecuted for embezzlement totalling 10 pounds 10 shillings. In 1910, while working as an accountant in Wellington, he slipped while alighting from a train near his home in Lower Hutt, fell onto the tracks, and was so badly injured by the train that one of his legs had to be amputated below the knee.
