= Elizabeth Parson =

- Born: Elizabeth Rooker; 5 June 1812; Tavistock
- Died: 6 May 1873 (aged 60); Plymouth

Elizabeth Parson (née Rooker; 5 June 1812 – 6 May 1873) was a British hymn writer.

== Life ==
Elizabeth Parson was born in Tavistock to Reverend William and Elizabeth Angas Rooker. William Rooker was the first minister at Tavistock United Reformed Church in Brook Street in 1796. This chapel was extended in 1820 and rebuilt following a fire in 1832.

From 1840, his daughter Elizabeth led a class for young members of the congregation. Over the next four years, Elizabeth wrote a number of hymns for her class. She stopped leading the class in 1840, which was the same year as she married Thomas Edgecombe Parson, who was a solicitor. They were married on 8 February 1844. Her younger brother William was a minister and another brother Alfred Rooker was mayor of Plymouth in 1851–1852.

Elizabeth Rooker died in 1873 in Plymouth.

A book of her hymns was privately published and two of her hymns were of particular interest. These were "Jesus, we love to meet" and "O happy land! O happy land!" In 1907, eleven of her hymns were said to be in "common use".
