= Gibson Turton =

New Zealand barrister and cricketer (1841–1891)

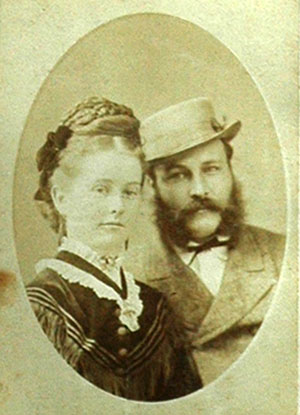
- Turton and his sister Laura in 1870

Personal information
- Full name: Gibson Kirke Turton
- Born: 29 July 1841; Raglan, Waikato, New Zealand
- Died: 3 July 1891 (aged 49); Wellington, New Zealand
- Role: Batsman

Domestic team information
- Years: Team
- 1863/64–1871/72: Otago

Career statistics
Competition	First-class
Matches	6
Runs scored	79
Batting average	8.77
100s/50s	0/0
Top score	28
Catches/stumpings	0/–
- Source: ESPNcricinfo, 22 December 2023

Gibson Kirke Turton (29 July 1841 – 3 July 1891) was a New Zealand barrister who was Provincial Solicitor of Otago, as well as a first-class cricketer who played six matches for Otago in the 1860s and 1870s. He was a native of Raglan, in the Waikato.

== Personal life ==
Turton married Annie Isabel Bathgate, a daughter of the Hon. J. B. Bathgate, in Dunedin in December 1866. They had six children. However, he took to alcohol, lost his position and left his family. He wandered in various parts of New Zealand and Australia, and died semi-destitute in Wellington.
