= Betty Clegg =

New Zealand artist (1926–2009)

- Born: Betty Clare Reeve; 24 March 1926; Wellington, New Zealand
- Died: 13 October 2009 (aged 83); Auckland, New Zealand
- Known for: Watercolours

Betty Clare Clegg (née Reeve, 24 March 1926 – 13 October 2009) was a New Zealand watercolour artist. Her work is held in the permanent collection of Museum of New Zealand Te Papa Tongarewa.

== Biography ==
Clegg was born in Wellington on 24 March 1926, the daughter of Nellie Frances Reeve (née Obee) and William John Reeve. She studied art and painting in Wellington and Sydney. She was active in the 1960s and 1970s, exhibiting with the New Zealand Academy of Fine Arts at the National Art Gallery in Wellington. In 1963 she was involved with the first summer school for painters run by Victoria University of Wellington in conjunction with the New Zealand Academy of Fine Arts and held in the Academy Gallery at the National Art Gallery. In the 1970s, fellow Wellington artist Joan Fanning painted her portrait as part of a series of portraits of women artists working in the city.

In 1996 Clegg moved to Auckland and settled on Waiheke Island. She died in Auckland on 13 October 2009.
