= William Belcher =

New Zealand seaman, unionist (?-1926)

William Belcher (c.1860 – 15 June 1926) was a New Zealand seaman and unionist. He was born in London, England on c.1860.
