= Josie Yelas =

New Zealand netball player

Personal information
- Full name: Josephine Margaret Yelas (Née: Hickey)
- Born: 26 March 1924 Auckland, New Zealand
- Died: 27 August 1996 (aged 72)
- Spouse: Mock Yelas (d. 1984)

Netball career
- Playing position: WD
Years	National team	Caps
1948	New Zealand	3

Josephine Margaret Yelas (née Hickey; 26 March 1924 – 27 August 1996) was a New Zealand netball player. She played as wing defence in the New Zealand team in all three Tests against the touring Australian team in 1948.

== Early life ==
Yelas was born Josephine Margaret Hickey in the Auckland suburb of Mount Eden on 26 March 1924, the daughter of Leo Valentine Hickey and Josephine May Hickey (née Lawson). Her father died in 1928 at Opua, where he was the stationmaster for New Zealand Railways.

== Netball career ==
Hickey was a member of the Auckland provincial netball team, and has been described as a "livewire" wing defence. After the 1947 national championships, at which Auckland finished second, she was selected for the New Zealand team to play the visiting Australian team the following year. Subsequently, she was chosen as one of the two players to appear in all three Test matches against Australia in 1948. New Zealand lost the first Test at Forbury Park in Dunedin 16–27. In the second Test in New Plymouth, New Zealand lost 13–44, with Hickey described as the best New Zealand player. The third Test in Auckland was won by Australia, 44–22.

In 1949, Hickey was part of the Auckland team that won the national provincial championships, and was said to be in "top form" in the deciding match against Canterbury that was won by Auckland 18–16. She was subsequently named in the North Island team, which drew 15–15 in the interisland match against the South Island.

Hickey again represented Auckland in the 1950 national championships, with Canterbury beating Auckland in the final 22–7. Once again she was named in the North Island team for the interisland match, which was won by the South Island 17–16.

== Later life and death ==
She married Moscow Joseph "Mock" Yelas, owner of Pleasant Valley Wines in West Auckland, as his second wife. Josie Yelas died on 27 August 1996, having been predeceased by her husband in 1984.
