= Richard Vincent (cricketer) =

English cricketer

Richard Barrett Vincent (c. 1846 – 17 September 1924) was an English cricketer born in London. He was active from 1886 to 1887 on a tour of New Zealand, where he appeared in one first-class match. He scored 9 runs.
