= Elizabeth Parsons (singer) =

Elizabeth Parsons (10 February 1846 – 1 March 1924) was a New Zealand singer. She was born in London, England. She was a leading member of the Wellington musical society and performed at every notable musical occasion in the city history between 1860 and 1896.
