= Alan Wilkinson (footballer) =

New Zealand footballer

Personal information
- Full name: Alan Wilkinson
- Date of birth: 7 August 1924
- Place of birth: Pukemiro, New Zealand
- Date of death: 12 March 2015 (aged 90)
- Place of death: Orewa, New Zealand
- Position: Forward

Youth career
- Mount Albert Grammar School

International career
Years	Team	Apps	(Gls)
1947	New Zealand	1	(0)

Alan Wilkinson (7 August 1924 – 12 March 2015) was a New Zealand football (soccer) player who represented his country at international level.

Wilkinson made a single appearance in an official international for New Zealand in a 0–6 loss to South Africa on 5 July 1947.
