= Frederick Liggins =

New Zealand cricketer

Personal information
- Full name: Frederick Collingwood Liggins
- Born: 5 June 1873; Dunedin, Otago, New Zealand
- Died: 28 May 1926 (aged 52); Perth, Western Australia
- Role: Batsman

Domestic team information
- Years: Team
- 1896/97–1900/01: Otago
- FC debut: 7 November 1896 Otago v Canterbury
- Last FC: 31 December 1900 Otago v Auckland

Career statistics
| Competition | First-class |
|---|---|
| Matches | 8 |
| Runs scored | 129 |
| Batting average | 11.72 |
| 100s/50s | 0/0 |
| Top score | 24 |
| Catches/stumpings | 4/– |
- Source: ESPNcricinfo, 15 May 2016

Frederick Collingwood Liggins (5 June 1873 – 28 May 1926) was a New Zealand cricketer. He played eight first-class matches for Otago between the 1896–97 and 1900–01 seasons.

Liggins was born at Dunedin in 1873 and educated at Otago Boys' High School in the city. He was described as a "batsman of the steady and slow order". His highest score for Otago was the 25 he scored against the touring Australians in 1896–97 when Otago needed 82 to win the match in their second innings but were dismissed for 64. Described in an obituary as "well known throughout New Zealand as a cricketer", in his eight first-class matches he scored a total of 129 runs.

He moved to Perth, Western Australia, where he was the manager of the Standard Fire and Marine Insurance Company of New Zealand. He served as the insurance companies' representative on the Perth Fire Brigades Board for 12 years before he died in May 1926 after a short illness at the age of 52.
