= Joseph Frear (builder) =

New Zealand builder and businessman

Joseph Frear (10 November 1846 – 23 December 1926) was a New Zealand builder and businessman. He was born in Grasby, Lincolnshire, England on 10 November 1846.
