= Mary Elizabeth Dawson =

Mary Elizabeth Dawson (9 May 1833 – 22 February 1924) was a New Zealand servant, farmer, environmentalist and nurse. She was born in Mersham, Kent, England on 9 May 1833.
