= 1923 in New Zealand =

- Decades: 1900s; 1910s; 1920s; 1930s; 1940s
- See also: History of New Zealand; List of years in New Zealand; Timeline of New Zealand history

The following lists events that happened during 1923 in New Zealand.

== Incumbents ==
=== Regal and viceregal ===
- Head of State – George V
- Governor-General – John Jellicoe, Viscount Jellicoe
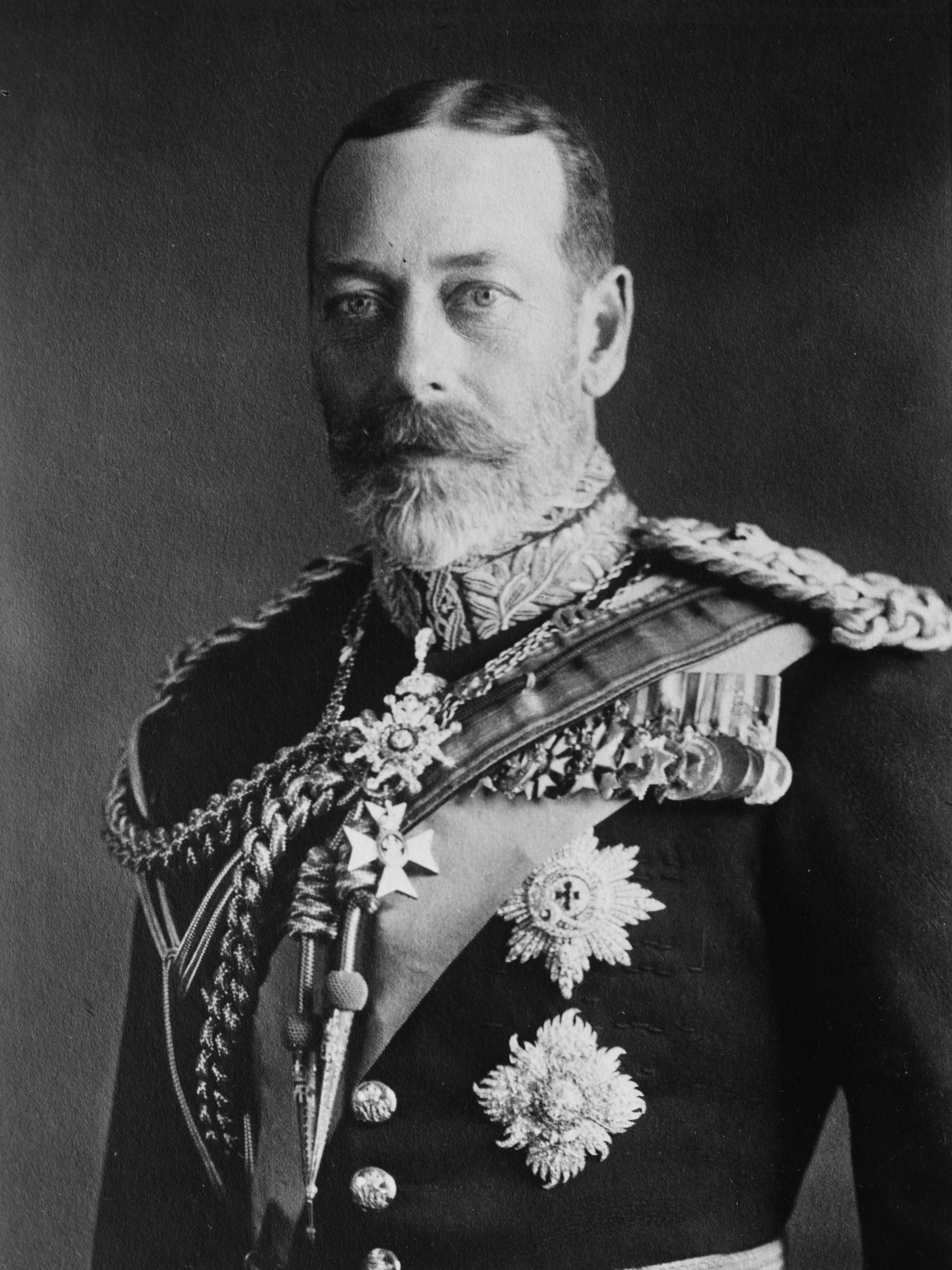
George V

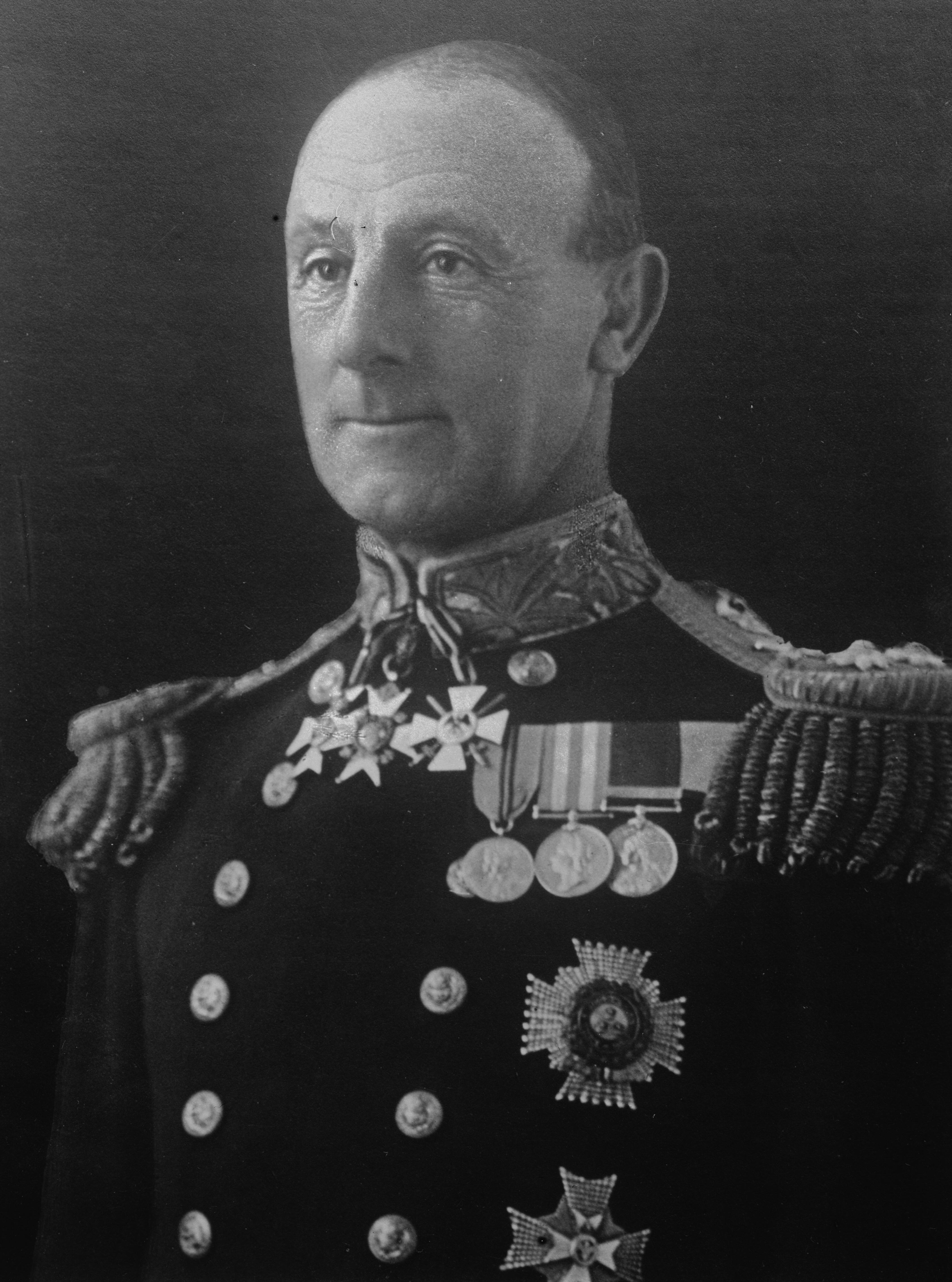
Viscount Jellicoe

=== Government ===
The 21st New Zealand Parliament begins. The Reform Party governs as a minority with the support of independents.

- Speaker of the House – Charles Statham (Independent)
- Prime Minister – William Massey
- Minister of Finance – William Massey
- Minister of External Affairs – Ernest Lee until 13 January, then Francis Bell from 7 June
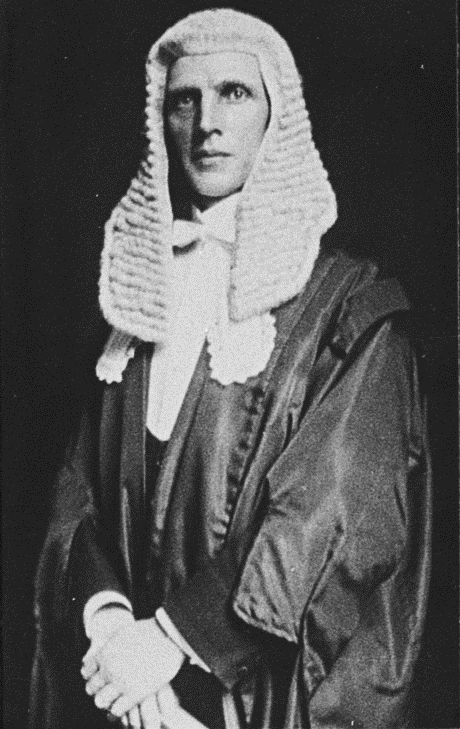
Charles Statham

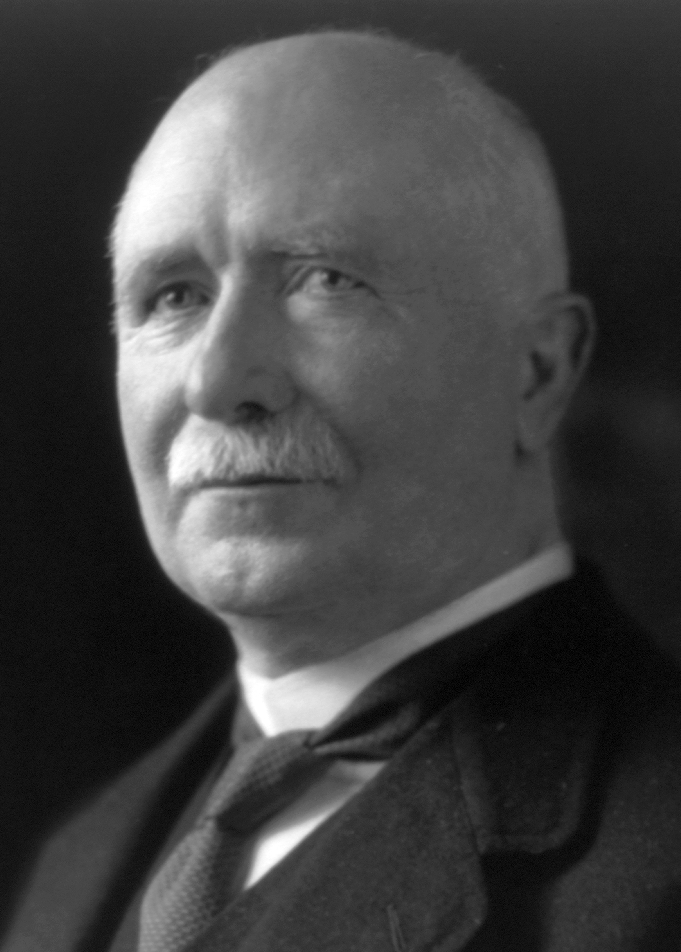
William Massey

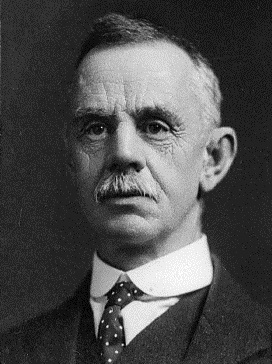
Ernest Lee

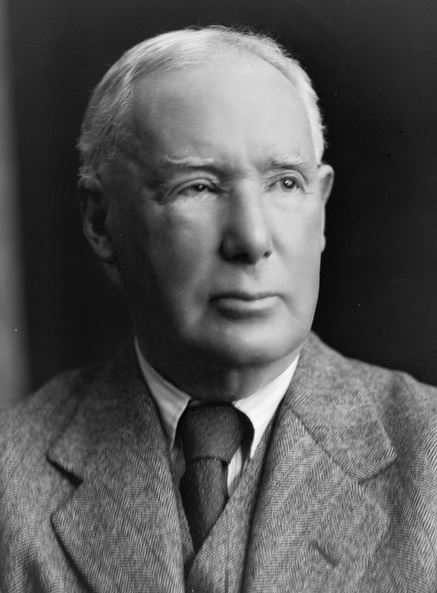
Francis Bell

=== Parliamentary opposition ===
- Leader of the Opposition – Thomas Wilford (Liberal Party)
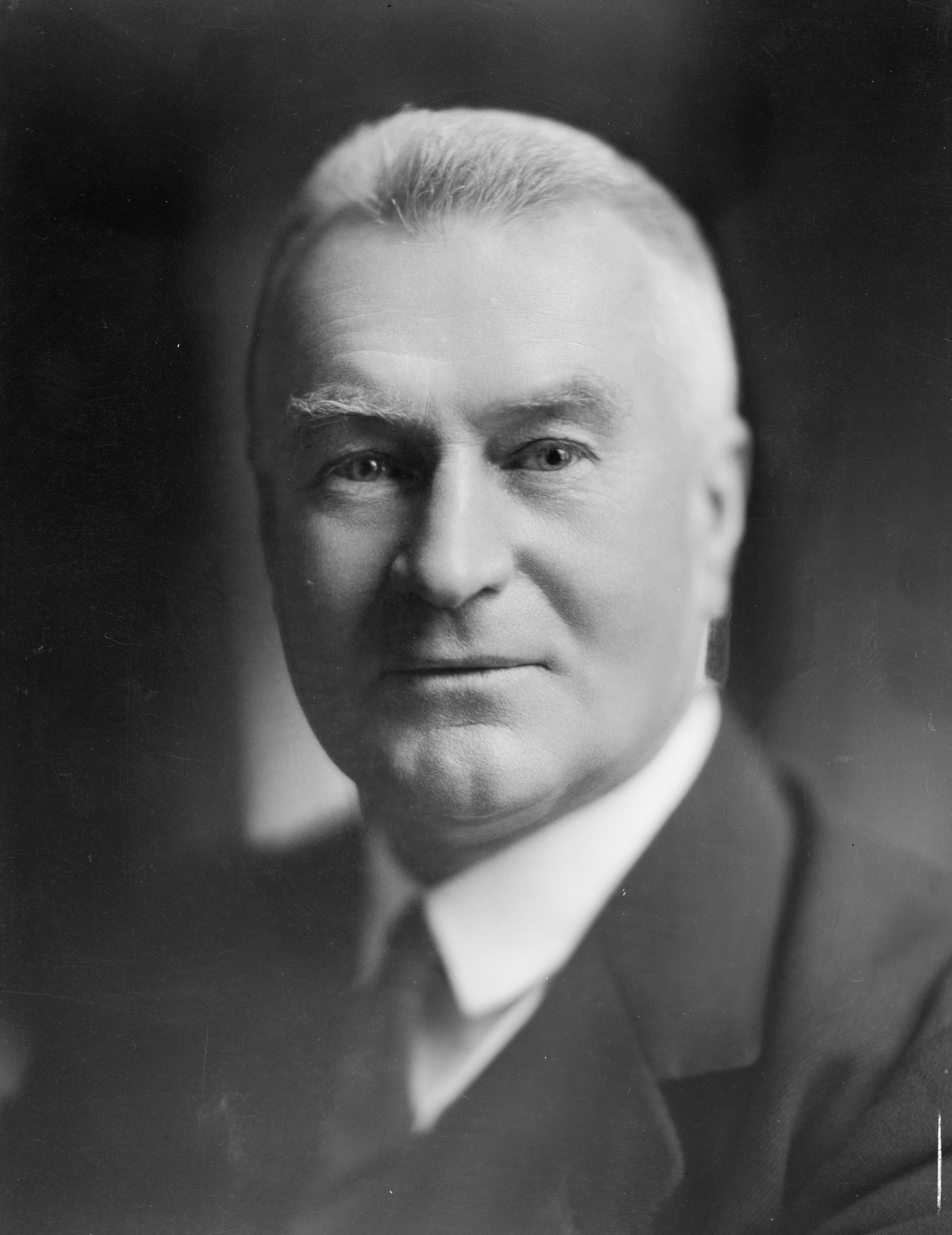
Thomas Wilford

=== Judiciary ===
- Chief Justice – Sir Robert Stout
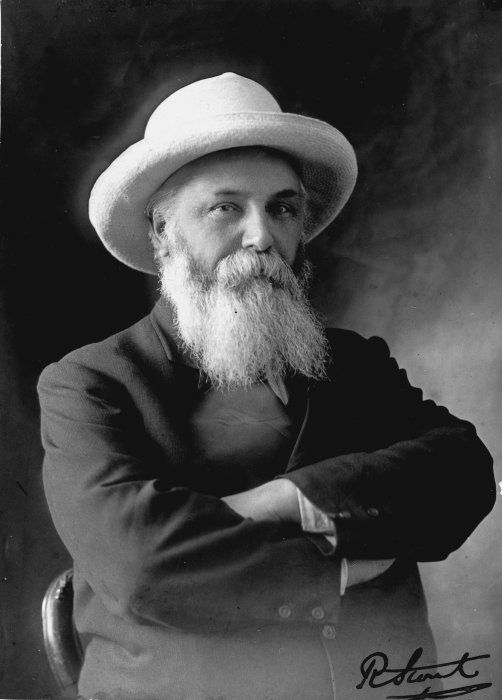
Robert Stout

=== Main centre leaders ===
- Mayor of Auckland – James Gunson
- Mayor of Wellington – Robert Wright
- Mayor of Christchurch – Henry Thacker, succeeded by James Flesher
- Mayor of Dunedin – James Douglas, succeeded by Harold Tapley
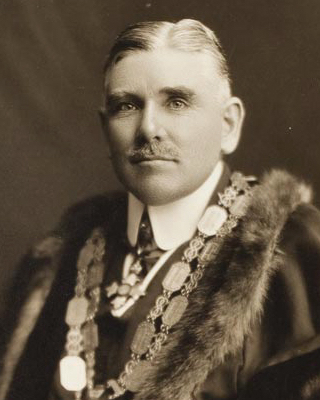
James Gunson

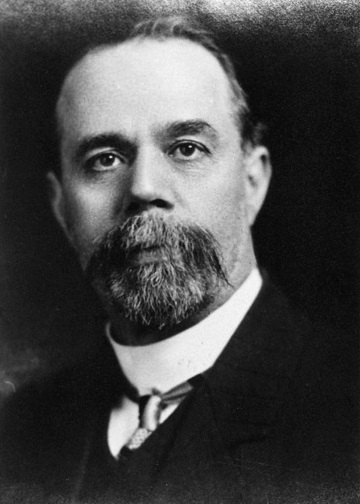
Robert Wright

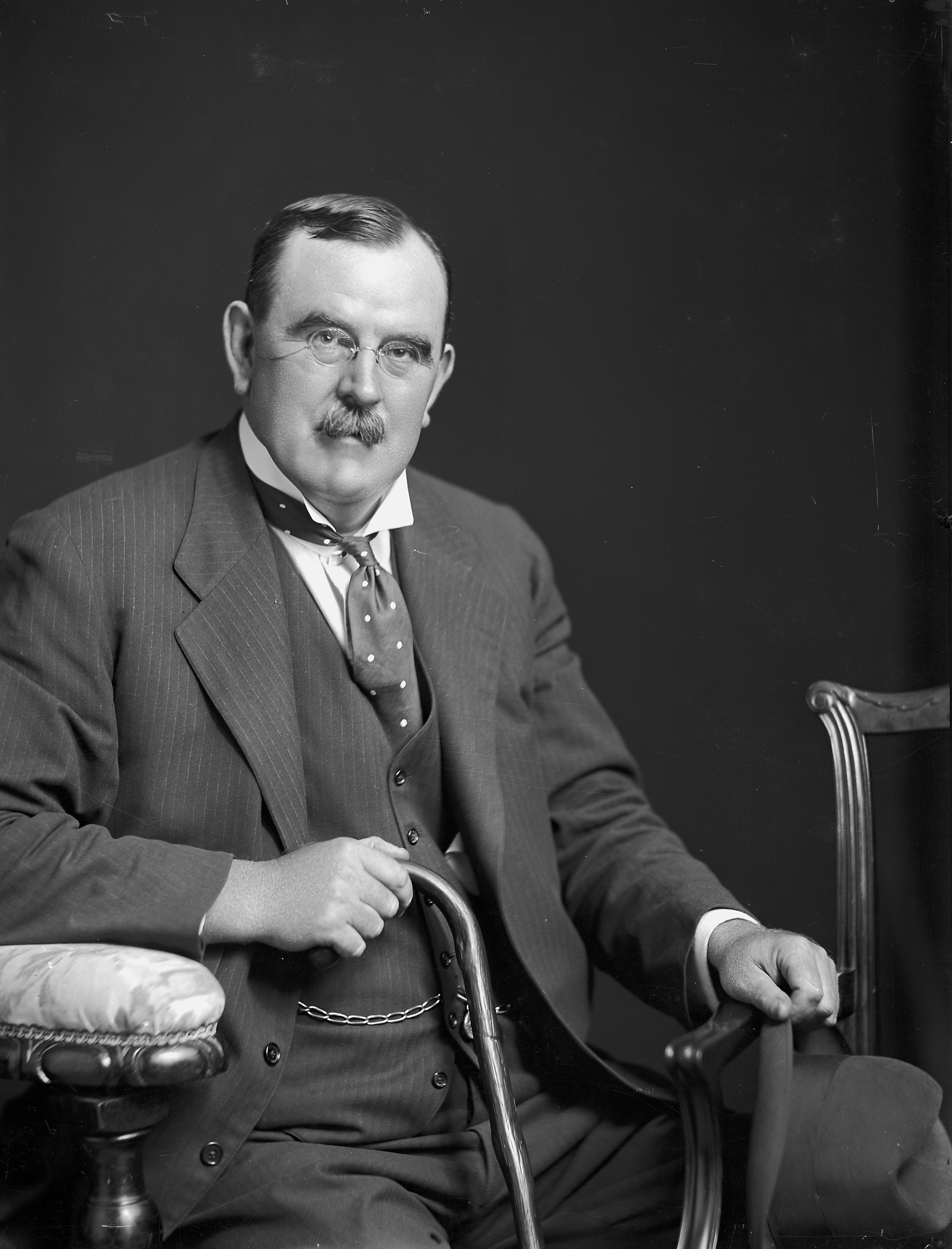
Henry Thacker

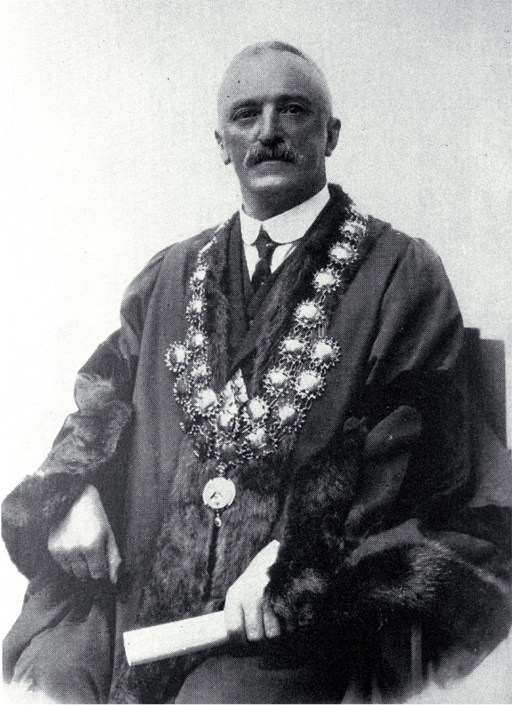
James Flesher

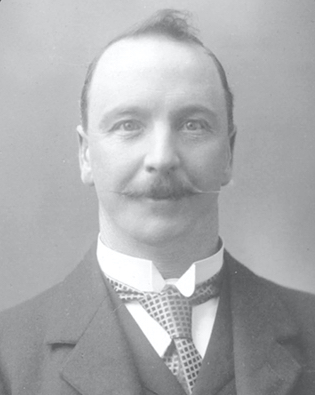
James Douglas

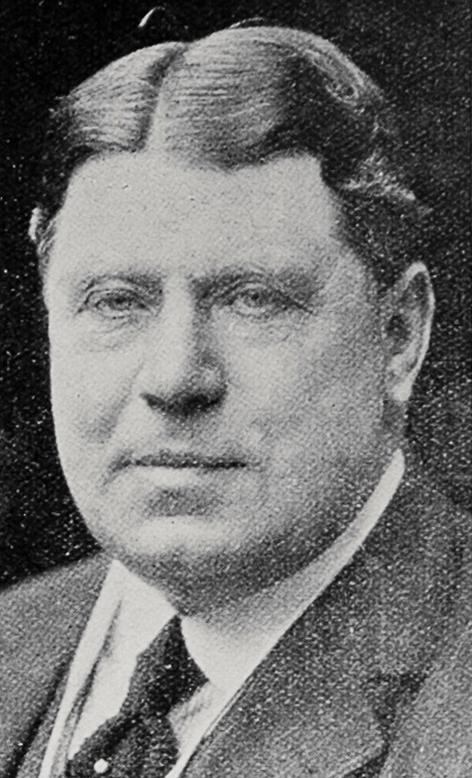
Harold Tapley

== Events ==
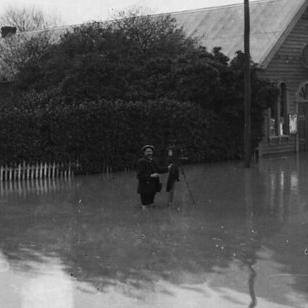
A photographer in the flooded Raven Street in Kaiapoi

- 28 March
  - The Tauranga by-election is won by Charles Macmillan (Reform Party)
  - The Native Bird Protection Society (now known as the Royal Forest and Bird Protection Society of New Zealand) is formed at a meeting in Wellington, with Sir Thomas Mackenzie elected inaugural president.
- March – The inflation rate in New Zealand reaches its lowest recorded value, −15.3 per cent
- 1 May – The Oamaru by-election is won by John MacPherson (Liberal Party)
- 5–9 May – The upper South Island and Wellington are hit by heavy rain, causing severe flooding. Three people drown in Marlborough. A quarter of Kaiapoi's population flee from rapidly rising water levels. Both telegraph lines connecting Christchurch with Wellington go down.
- 14 June − The New Zealand Permanent Air Force, the forerunner of the Royal New Zealand Air Force, is established
- 6 July – The Ongarue railway disaster results in the deaths of 17 passengers when the overnight Auckland-Wellington Express runs into a landslip at Ongarue near Taumarunui
- 4 August – Opening of the Otira Tunnel on the Midland Line
- 15 December – The British and Intercolonial Exhibition opens in Hokitika

Undated

- New Zealand gains the right to conduct its own trade negotiations independently of Britain
- The Ross Dependency is claimed by Britain and placed under New Zealand administration
- The Royal Navy battlecruiser HMS New Zealand, funded by the New Zealand government as a gift to Britain before World War I, is broken up for scrap

== Arts and literature ==
See 1923 in art, 1923 in literature, Category:1923 books

=== Music ===
Production of the musical "Tutankhamen" by L.P.Leary at His Majesty's Theatre in Auckland. Music by Eric Waters.

See: 1923 in music

=== Radio ===
- A set of Broadcasting regulations are issued under the Post And Telegraph Act 1920. Under the new regulations the country is divided into four numerical transmission regions. The regulations also stipulate that the owner of a receiving set is to pay an annual licence of five shillings while permission to transmit costs two pounds.

See: Public broadcasting in New Zealand

=== Film ===
- The Romance of Sleepy Hollow

See: 1923 in film, List of New Zealand feature films, Cinema of New Zealand, Category:1923 films

== Sport ==
=== Chess ===
- The 32nd National Chess Championship is held in Christchurch, and is won by John Boyd Dunlop of Oamaru (his third title)

=== Cricket ===
- Plunket Shield

=== Football ===
- The inaugural competition for the Chatham Cup is won by Seacliff AFC (Otago)
- The New Zealand team tours Australia, playing 16 matches:
  - 24 May, at Granville – lose 1–3 vs Granville
  - 26 May, at Sydney – draw 2–2 vs New South Wales
  - 29 May, at Newcastle – lose 0–2 vs Newcastle
  - 2 June, at Ipswich – win 4–2 vs Ipswich / West Moreton
  - 4 June, at Brisbane – win 3–1 vs Queensland
  - 6 June, at Nambour – win 2–0 vs North Coast
  - 9 June, at Brisbane – lose 1–2 vs Australia
  - 13 June, at Cessnock – lose 1–2 vs South Maitland
  - 16 June, at Sydney – win 3–2 vs Australia
  - 20 June, at Sydney – win 3–4 vs Metropolis
  - 23 June, at Sydney – win 3–1 vs Granville
  - 25 June, at Sydney – draw 1–1 vs New South Wales
  - 30 June, at Newcastle – win 4–1 vs Australia
  - 3 July, at Weston – lose 1–4 vs South Maitland
  - 7 July, at Wollongong – lose 0–2 vs South Coast
  - 11 July, at Lithgow – win 4–0 vs Western Districts
- Provincial league champions:
  - Auckland – North Shore AFC (Devonport)
  - Canterbury – Sunnyside
  - Hawke's Bay – Whakatu
  - Nelson – Athletic
  - Otago – HSOB
  - South Canterbury – Albion Rovers
  - Southland – Nightcaps
  - Taranaki – Hawera
  - Wanganui – Eastown Workshops
  - Wellington – Waterside

=== Golf ===
- The 10th New Zealand Open championship is won by A. Brooks.
- The 27th National Amateur Championships are held in Wanganui:
  - Men – J. Goss (Wanganui)
  - Women – E. Vigor Brown (Napier)

=== Horse racing ===
==== Harness racing ====
- New Zealand Trotting Cup – Great Hope
- Auckland Trotting Cup – Blue Mountain King

==== Thoroughbred racing ====
- New Zealand Cup – Rouen
- Auckland Cup – Te Kara / Muraahi (dead heat)
- Wellington Cup – Rapine
- New Zealand Derby – Black Ronald
- ARC Great Northern Derby – Enthusiasm

=== Lawn bowls ===
The national outdoor lawn bowls championships are held in Auckland.

- Men's singles champion – M. Walker (Ponsonby Bowling Club)
- Men's pair champions – W. McCallum, T. Edwards (skip) (Temuka Bowling Club)
- Men's fours champions – R.S. Somervell, J.F. Hosking, V.P. Casey, A. Parsons (skip) (Ponsonby Bowling Club)

=== Rugby union ===
- A New South Wales team tours New Zealand, playing three matches against the New Zealand team. New Zealand wins all three: 19–9, 34–6 and 38–11.
- Hawke's Bay defend the Ranfurly Shield for the full season, defeating Wairarapa (6–0), Wellington (10–6), Poverty Bay (15–0), Canterbury (9–8), Horowhenua (38–11), and Auckland (20–5).

=== Shooting ===
- Ballinger Belt – Les Loveday (Linton)

== Births ==
=== January–February ===
- 2 January – Joe McManemin, athletics coach, sports administrator
- 6 January – Norman Kirk, politician
- 11 January – Charles Philip Littlejohn, parliamentary officer
- 15 January – Nick Unkovich, lawn bowls player
- 27 January – Robert Burchfield, lexicographer
- 11 February – Bryce Rope, rugby union player and coach
- 26 February – Jean Anderson, pianist and professor of music

=== March–April ===
- 1 March – Stephen Jelicich, architect, historian
- 2 March
  - Ron Elvidge, rugby union player
  - Don Taylor, cricketer
- 12 March – James Godwin, war crimes investigator
- 13 March – Travers Hardwick, rugby league player and coach
- 24 March – Poul Gnatt, ballet dancer and ballet master
- 26 March – Ronald Dobson, rugby union player
- 27 March – Donald Murdoch, cricketer
- 31 March – Lawrie Miller, cricketer
- 6 April – Rina Moore, doctor
- 7 April
  - Lindsay Daen, sculptor
  - Russell Stone, historian
- 14 April – Stan Cowman, cricket umpire
- 16 April – Thomas Freeman, cricketer
- 17 April – Ken Mudford, motorcycle racer
- 18 April – Allan Deane, cricketer
- 26 April – Harold Nelson, athlete
- 29 April – Jean Herbison, academic, university chancellor

=== May–June ===
- 17 May – Doug Ottley, association footballer
- 26 May
  - Bill Meates, rugby union player
  - Thomas Paulay, earthquake engineer, academic
- 4 June – Olga Stringfellow, journalist and author
- 7 June – Peter Sutton, Anglican bishop
- 19 June – Rex Orr, rugby union player
- 25 June – Margaret Reid, Presbyterian minister
- 30 June – Melvin Day, artist

=== July–August ===
- 8 July – Margaret di Menna, microbiologist
- 13 July – Max Lewis, cricketer
- 14 July – Noel Chambers, swimmer
- 16 July
  - Richard Bolt, air force officer
  - Terry Harris, water polo player
- 18 July
  - John Morton, marine zoologist, theologian, conservationist
  - JJ Stewart, rugby union coach and administrator, politician
- 26 July – Betty Gilderdale, children's author
- 28 July – Bill Sevesi, musician
- 9 August – Bob Neilson, rugby league player
- 11 August – Roy Roper, rugby union player
- 12 August – Janet Holm, environmental activist, historian
- 14 August – Jack Luxton, politician
- 15 August – Norm Jones, politician
- 28 August – Maurice Casey, jurist

=== September–October ===
- 9 September – Des Christian, rugby union player and coach
- 19 September – Bob Sorenson, rugby union player and coach, cricketer
- 29 September – Vernon McArley, cricketer
- 3 October – Jack McLean, rugby union and rugby league player
- 4 October – Lachie Grant, rugby union player
- 9 October
  - Bob Fenton, politician
  - Ronald Tremain, composer, music academic
- 11 October – Ed Nichols, alpine skier
- 15 October
  - Joyce Carpenter, diver
  - Jim McCormick, rugby union player
- 18 October – Rob Talbot, politician
- 20 October – Mike Minogue, politician
- 29 October
  - David Kear, geologist, science administrator
  - Ted Thorne, naval officer

=== November–December ===
- 1 November – Peter Mahon, jurist
- 4 November – Joan Hatcher, cricketer
- 5 November – Frederick Stanley, cricketer
- 9 November – Marion Robinson, physiologist and nutritionist
- 10 November – Brian Ashby, Roman Catholic bishop
- 11 November – Sonja Davies, trade unionist, peace activist, politician
- 13 November – Austen Gittos, fencer
- 17 November
  - Dick Scott, historian, journalist
  - Bert Sutcliffe, cricketer
- 18 November – Neville Pickering, politician
- 20 November – Robert Harwood, cricketer
- 22 November – Guy Doleman, actor
- 28 November – Eric Heath, cartoonist
- 2 December – Andy Keyworth, master mariner
- 6 December – Karl Sim, art forger
- 13 December – Richard Campion, theatre director
- 14 December – Bob Quickenden, association footballer
- 17 December – John Darwin, statistician
- 20 December
  - Arthur Mills, cricketer
  - Noel Taylor, athlete
- 24 December – Bert Cook, rugby union and rugby league player

== Deaths ==
=== January–March ===
- 9 January – Katherine Mansfield, writer (born 1888)
- 14 January – Frederick Radcliffe, photographer (born 1863)
- 28 January – Alfred Holdship, cricketer (born 1867)
- 6 February – William Thomas Jennings, politician (born 1854)
- 22 February – Sir William Herries, politician (born 1859)
- 17 March – Daniel Cooper, convicted baby farmer and illegal abortionist (born 1881)
- 25 March – John Patterson, politician, businessman (born 1855)
- 26 March – William Wescombe Corpe, sawmiller, dairy manufacturer (born 1836)

=== April–June ===
- 3 April
  - Charles H. Mills, politician (born 1843)
  - Arthur Seymour, politician (born 1832)
- 4 April – Charles Curtis, storekeeper, local-body politician (born 1850)
- 12 April
  - William Collins, politician (born 1853)
  - Randell McDonnell, cricketer (born 1843)
- 27 April – Gordon Millington, cricketer (born 1848)
- 7 May – Walter Dinnie, police commissioner (born 1850)
- 9 May – John Fuller, singer and theatrical company manager (born 1850)
- 21 May – Leopold Prime, cricketer (born 1884)

=== July–September ===
- 8 July – Henry Lawson, cricketer (born 1862)
- 16 July – Sir William Fraser, politician (born 1840)
- 27 July – William Dawson, brewer, politician (born 1852)
- 1 August – Frank Wright, artist (born 1860)
- 3 August – Frederick Fulton, cricketer (born 1859)
- 8 September – Thomas Mahoney, architect (born c.1854)
- 23 September – Sarah Higgins, midwife, writer (born 1830)
- 26 September – Hoani Te Whatahoro Jury, Ngāti Kahungunu scholar, recorder, interpreter (born 1841)

=== October–December ===
- 8 October – Angus Stuart, rugby union player (born 1858)
- 15 October – Thomas Frederic Cheeseman, botanist (born 1846)
- 17 October – William Meares, cricketer (born 1848)
- 10 November – John Stallworthy, politician (born 1854)
- 11 November – Robert Murdoch, malacologist (born 1861)
- 25 November – Sydney Callaway, cricketer (born 1868)
- 29 November – Gilbert Mair, soldier, interpreter, public servant (born 1843)
- 11 December – Joseph Maddison, architect (born 1850)
- 14 December – Michael Godby, cricketer (born 1850)

== See also ==
- History of New Zealand
- List of years in New Zealand
- Military history of New Zealand
- Timeline of New Zealand history
- Timeline of New Zealand's links with Antarctica
- Timeline of the New Zealand environment
