= Frederick Radcliffe =

Frederick Radcliffe may refer to:

- Frederick Morton Radcliffe (1861–1953), solicitor and founding member of Liverpool Cathedral
- Frederick George Radcliffe (1863–1923), New Zealand farmer and photographer
