= Robert Harwood =

Robert Harwood may refer to:

- Robert Harwood (politician) (1826–1897), landowner and political figure in Lower Canada and Quebec
- Robert Harwood (cricketer) (1923–1992), New Zealand cricketer
- Robert B. Harwood (1902–1991), justice of the Alabama Supreme Court
- Robert Unwin Harwood (1798–1863), last Seigneur of Vaudreuil
- Rob Harwood (born 1997), Scottish field hockey player

== See also ==
- Robert Harward (disambiguation)
