= Fred Stanley =

Fred or Frederick Stanley may refer to:

- Fred Stanley (politician) (1888–1957), Australian politician in the New South Wales Legislative Assembly
- Fred Stanley (baseball) (born 1947), Major League Baseball infielder and executive
- Frederick Stanley, 16th Earl of Derby (1841–1908), British politician and Governor General of Canada
- Frederick Trent Stanley (1802–1883), American industrialist
- Frederick Stanley (cricketer) (1923–1993), New Zealand cricketer
