= Walter Wright (artist) =

New Zealand artist (1866–1933)

- Born: 1866; Nottingham, England
- Died: 9 January 1933 (aged 66–67); Auckland, New Zealand
- Known for: painting

Walter Wright (1866 – 9 January 1933) was a New Zealand artist best known for his historical paintings, particularly those depicting aspects of Māori life and culture.

== Early life ==
Walter Wright was born in Nottingham, England, in 1866 and, following the death of his father when he was 11 years old, emigrated to New Zealand with his family. The family settled in Auckland and Wright worked as an upholstery apprentice on Shortland Street, an area where there were several artist shops and studios. From his early 20s, he was exhibiting at the Auckland Society of Arts (ASA), with one of his earliest, a seaside scene set at Shelley Beach, remarked upon at the time as showing "real genius right through". In 1894, he and his brother Frank Wright, with whom he had set up a studio at Victoria Arcade in Auckland, returned to England, where they studied art at Heatherley Art School. Walter went on to study under Stanhope Forbes.

== Professional career ==
Returning to New Zealand, Wright sought to make his career making and teaching art from his studio in Auckland. In 1907, with his brother, he traveled around the country making a series of watercolours, 75 in all, that were published the following year as illustrations for William Pember Reeves' book, New Zealand. More of their work was published in Frank Fox's Oceania in 1911.

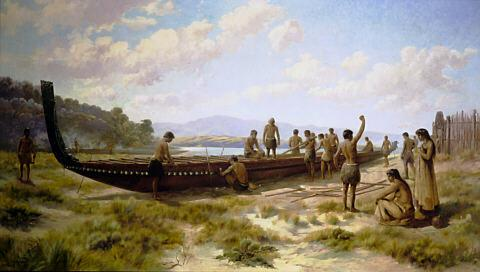
Wright collaborated with his brother Frank to produce The Canoe Builders

While some of his work was of everyday scenes around Auckland Harbour and its beaches, over time, Wright became best known for his works depicting aspects of Māori life and culture, in which he was regarded as a "leading exponent". His topics ranged from scenes of women washing clothes in hot pools, the preparation of food, harvesting crops, and large gatherings. His A Native Gathering was singled out for praise by one reviewer assessing the ASA's 1910 annual exhibition. However, art historian Leonard Bell while noting the apparent realism in Wright's images, comments on their somewhat "staginess". The A Native Gathering was purchased for the Auckland Art Gallery and The Canoe Builders, a 1915 collaboration with his brother Frank, was gifted to the same institution by Sir James Parr, the mayor of Auckland.

One of Wright's best known works is The Burning of the Boyd, Whangaroa Harbour, 1809, a depiction of the namesake event in which over 60 colonists and sailors were killed by Māori of Ngāti Pou in revenge for the flogging of their Rangatira (chief) and their vessel, the Boyd, destroyed when it was inadvertently set alight when looted the next day. Displayed at the ASA's annual exhibition of 1908, it was acclaimed as that year's "finest picture". Bell notes that it is not a particularly accurate representation of the event, pointing out the painting suggests a deliberate burning of the Boyd rather than the accident it actually was. A large canvas of 1248 x 1770 mm, this was acquired for the Auckland Art Gallery with funds sourced from the Auckland Picture Purchase Fund, one of two major works purchased in 1908.

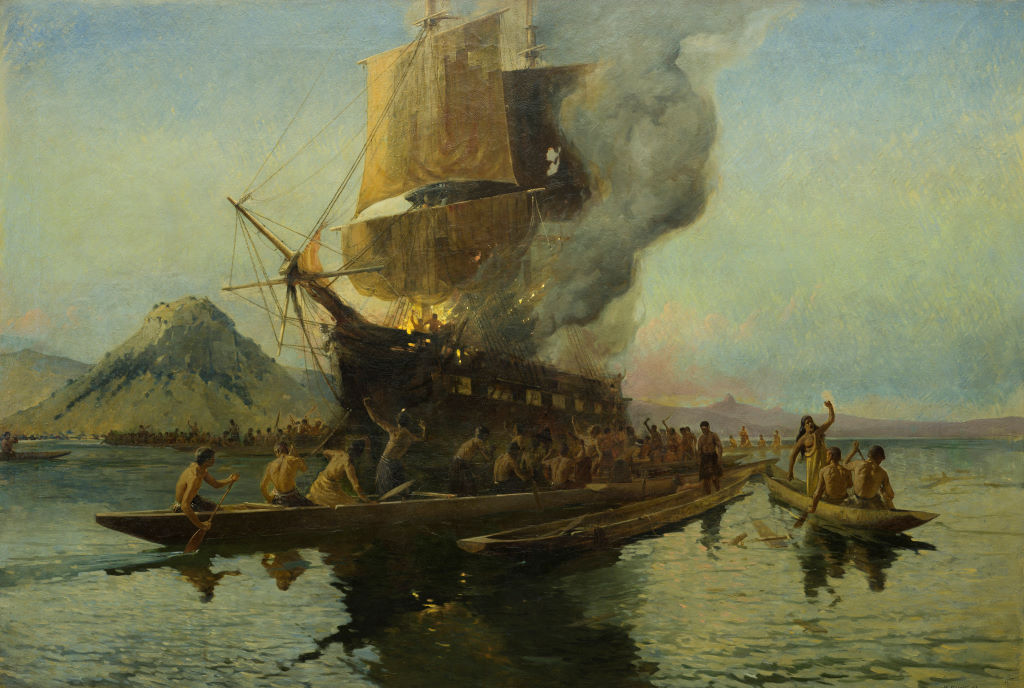
The Burning of the Boyd, executed in 1908, is one of Wright's most famous paintings

== Later life ==
A life member of the ASA, Wright was involved in the organisation of its various exhibitions. In his later years, he became somewhat reclusive, particularly following the death of Frank in 1923. His final exhibition with the ASA was in 1925. His output was affected by failing eyesight and he ceased teaching art. He died in Auckland on 9 January 1933 and was survived by his wife.
