= Robert Harward (disambiguation) =

Robert Harward is a Navy SEAL.

Robert Harward may also refer to:

- Robert Harward (MP) (died 1534)

== See also ==
- Robert Harwood (disambiguation)
