= Barry Freeman =

New Zealand cricketer (1948–2026)

Personal information
- Full name: Barry Thomas Freeman
- Born: 28 February 1948; Dunedin, New Zealand
- Died: 2 July 2026 (aged 78); Darfield, New Zealand
- Batting: Right-handed
- Relatives: Thomas Freeman (father)

Domestic team information
- Years: Team
- 1969–70–1970–71: Otago
- Source: Cricinfo, 10 May 2016

Barry Thomas Freeman (28 February 1948 – 2 July 2026) was a New Zealand cricketer. He played eight first-class matches for Otago in the 1969–70 and 1970–71 seasons.

Freeman was born at Dunedin in 1948 and educated at Otago Boys' High School in the city. His father, Thomas Freeman was a schoolteacher who also played first-class cricket for Otago.
