= Glen Massey Line =

Private railway in New Zealand

Overview
- Status: Closed
- Owner: Private then State Mines Department
- Termini: Ngāruawāhia; Glen Massey

Service
- Operator(s): Private then New Zealand Railways Department

History
- Opened: 1 March 1914
- Closed: 19 May 1958

Technical
- Line length: 10.64 km (6.61 mi)
- Number of tracks: Single
- Character: Rural/Industrial
- Track gauge: 1,067 mm (3 ft 6 in)
Route map
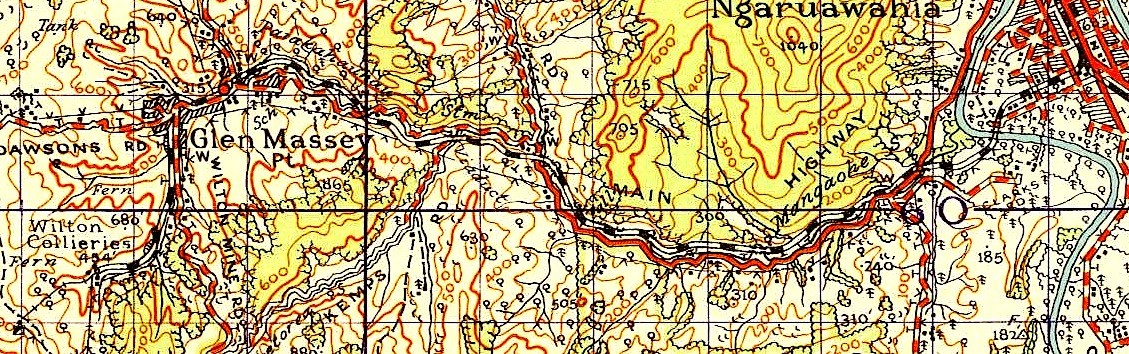
1944 one inch map.

Map

The Glen Massey Line was a private railway of 10.6 km near Ngāruawāhia in the Waikato region of New Zealand, built to serve coal mines, and, from 1935, run by the New Zealand Railways Department. The line had grades of 1 in 40, sharp curves – sharpest 6 ch (400 ft; 120 m) and 40 of less than 10 ch (660 ft; 200 m) – and 22 bridges, including a 91.5-metre-long and 18.3-metre-high timber trestle bridge over Firewood Creek halfway between Ngāruawāhia and Glen Massey and a 70-foot-long (21 m) bridge, adapted in 1917 to take sheep, on 52 ft (16 m) piles over the Waipā River, as well as the railway, after collapse of the road bridge.

== Origins of the railway ==
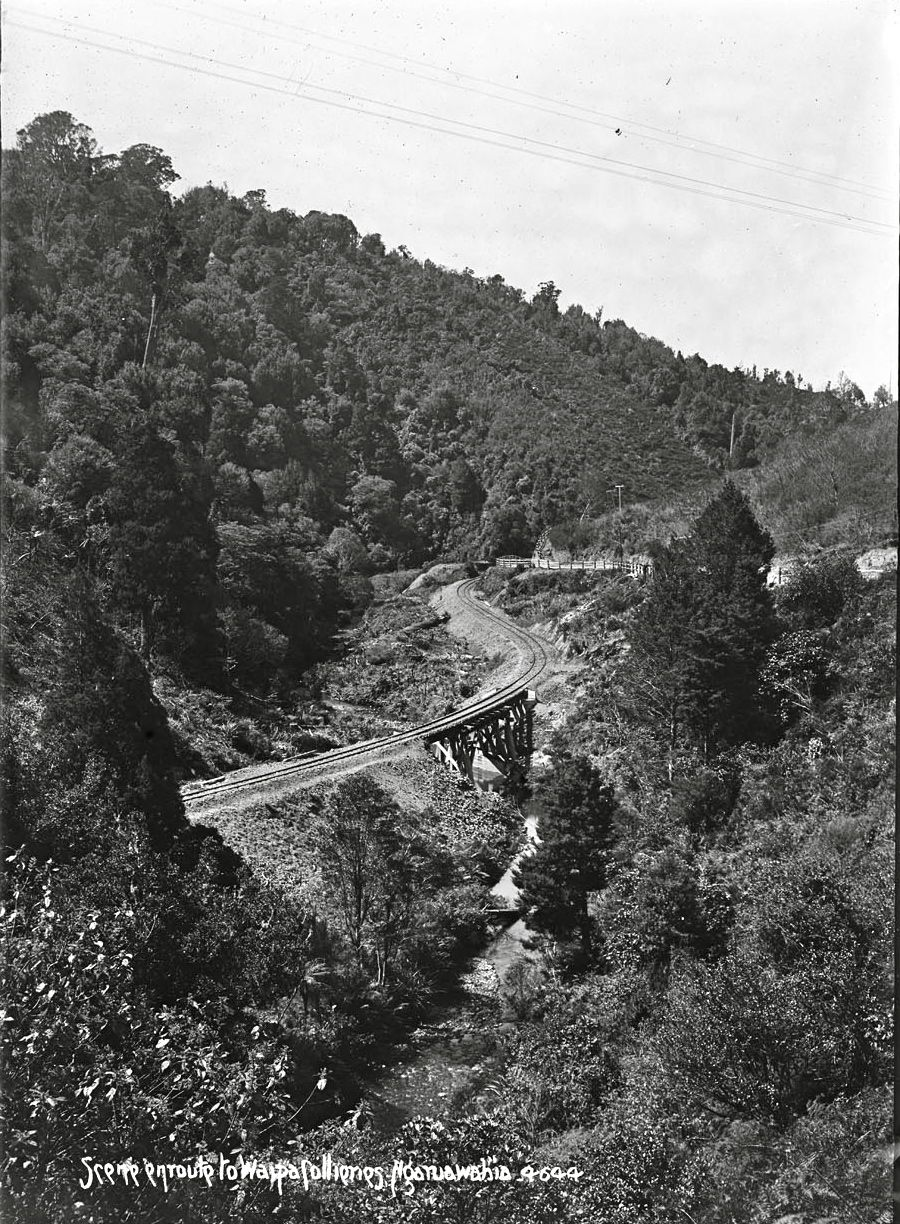
An undated photo by Frederick George Radcliffe of a bridge over Firewood Creek, probably about 1917: Auckland Libraries Heritage Collections 35-R0959

Glen Massey's coal was known of by 1867, when it was suggested a tramway should be built down what is now known as the Firewood Creek valley. In 1908 government was asked to extend the proposed railway to Whaingaroa Harbour, but rejected that in favour of an extension of the proposed Glen Afton branch. Neither ever happened.

Waipa Railway and Collieries Ltd was formed with a nominal capital of £80,000 in January 1910. The construction contract was let in 1911 for £26,500. Actual construction began in 1910, when a private siding was built at Ngāruawāhia on the North Island Main Trunk, and used from May 1912 to supply construction materials for the 8.2 km line to Glen Massey. The Prime Minister turned the first sod on 12 March 1912. The line was opened to Glen Massey in March 1914, and coal transport commenced, using a weigh-bridge at the Ngaruawahia private siding. The company bought a new loco, N^{O} 1, in 1913 from Andrew Barclay and, in 1914, purchased a second-hand ex-Wellington and Manawatu Railway tank locomotive from NZR, W^{H} 449. Initial problems with lineside fires were resolved by fitting spark arrestors.

A regular Saturday passenger service ran for many years, known as the "Wilton Express", using three ex-WMR clerestory carriages. A 'Waipa Collieries' advert, placed by the mine's first manager, showed passenger trains leaving Glen Massey at 8.30am and Ngāruawāhia at 4pm, with passengers also taken on coal trains leaving Glen Massey at 11.30am and 2.30pm and Ngāruawāhia at 10am and 1pm.

== Wilton Collieries Ltd ==
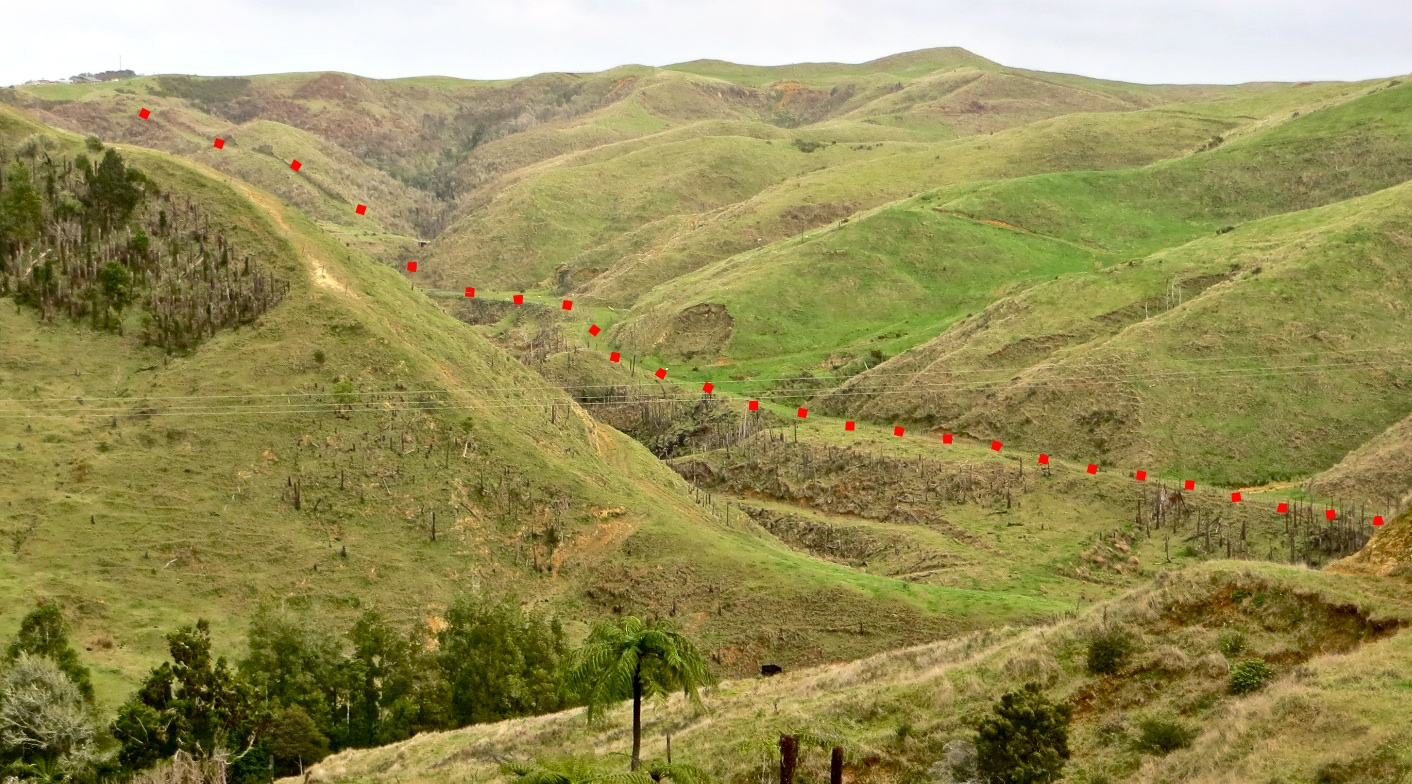
2014 view from Wilton Collieries Rd of the upper end of the railway and one of the connecting, rope worked, inclines at the Wilton Mine.

By 1930 the original mine was worked out and the company went into liquidation. A new coal seam was found 3.5 km to the south; a new company, "Wilton Collieries Ltd", was formed to operate this line, which was known as the Waipa Railway and Collieries Limited private line, and from October 1944 as the Wilton Collieries Limited private line. Initially it had been planned to link the new mine to the railway by an aerial ropeway, but extending the railway was found to be more practicable and an application to extend the line was made in 1929. The railway line was sold to the new company for £10,000 in November 1930 and extended by about 2.2 km. The company purchased two ex-NZR tank locomotives, W^{D} 356 and W^{D} 316 in 1934 and 1933 to run the line, W^{D} 356 being purchased primarily to replace the former Waipa Railway & Collieries No. 1, which had been lost in the Windy Creek runaway and derailment in 1933. Both of the W^{D} class locomotives were noted as being beyond repair by 1935.

== Mines Department control and closure ==
With no working locomotives, Wilton Collieries Ltd handed operations of the railway over to the New Zealand Railways, which began working the line from 12 August 1935 onwards. Initially operated using the W^{W} class 4-6-4T tank locomotives, the line was operated from 26 February 1937 by the larger B^{B} class 4-8-0 tender locomotives, which continued to run the line until final closure with some occasional assistance from W^{W} class locomotives.

In 1944, the Wilton Collieries Ltd mine at Glen Massey and associated railway between Glen Massey and Ngāruawāhia were nationalised in 1944 for £86,000. Mine output was 70,000 tons of coal annually, half of which was for the NZR. Three return trips a day carried 400 tons daily. In 1935, track deterioration resulted in speed limits, initially 20 mph (32 km/h), but from 10 December 1935 15 mph (24 km/h) to Glen Massey and then 10 mph (16 km/h) to the mine. The line was closed on 19 May 1958.

A short section is now part of the Hakarimata Rail Trail.

== Locomotives ==
To operate the new line, Waipa Railway & Collieries Ltd purchased a small 0-6-2T from Andrew Barclay, Works N^{O} 1292/1913, which became WR&C N^{O} 1. This locomotive remained in service until 1933 when it ran away and derailed at Windy Creek during shunting operations; Wilton Collieries Ltd (who now owned the railway) decided not to retrieve the locomotive and its remains were left at Windy Creek where they remain to this day.

To assist with the work, WR&C purchased another locomotive from NZR in 1914, 2-6-2T W^{H} 449 (Manning Wardle 923/1884). This locomotive had formerly been WMR N^{O} 4, and was used in regular service up until 1933 when it was put aside at the colliery screens. It was noted as still being there, albeit derelict, in 1957 when enthusiast Peter Mellor visited, but was presumably scrapped following the closure of the mine and railway in 1958.

Following the purchase of the mine and railway by Wilton Collieries Ltd in 1930, the new company purchased two further locomotives from the NZR, a pair of Baldwin Locomotive Works W^{D} class 2-6-4T tank locomotives. W^{D} 316 (Baldwin 18543/1901) and W^{D} 356 (Baldwin 19260/1901) were purchased in 1934 and 1933 respectively, the former replacing Waipa Railway & Collieries N^{O} 1 after its accident in 1933 and the latter replacing W^{H} 449. Both were out of service and noted as being beyond repair in 1935, by which time the NZR had taken over. The eventual disposal of W^{D} 316 is unknown; W^{D} 356 survived in some capacity, possibly at another location under new owners, until the Second World War when its frames were cut into sections and dumped at Konini near Pahiatua to prevent erosion.

== Accidents ==
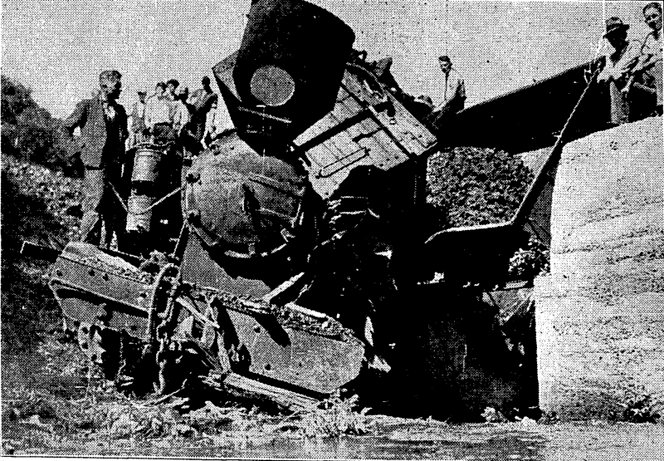
Wilton Collieries N^{O} 1 following the runaway and crash at Windy Creek in 1933 – photo: Alexander Turnbull Library, Wellington.

- 6 June 1914 – Builder A. J. Smith is struck and killed by a runaway truck at the Glen Massey colliery screening bins.
- 8 January 1921 – New Zealand Railways porter Robert Percy Broady is fatally run over while in charge of shunting carried out by Wilton Collieries N^{O} 1 at Ngāruawāhia.
- 22 November 1926 – A Rotorua express hauled by A^{B} 819 was side-swiped by Wilton Collieries N^{O} 1 while shunting at Ngāruawāhia, causing damage to both locomotives.
- 19 November 1927 – Two motor trolleys collided on a viaduct, injuring 2 seriously.
- 28 March 1933 – Wilton Collieries N^{O} 1 and six wagons run away while shunting at Glen Massey on a 1 in 40 gradient; the train derailed at Windy Creek, killing driver William McLean. The locomotive remains were cut in half and moved downstream of the railway bridge in 1936 to avoid damage to the railway bridge.
- 18 November 1935 – Washout occurs at Windy Creek.

== See also ==
- Cambridge Branch
- Glen Afton Branch
- Kimihia Branch
- Kinleith Branch
- North Island Main Trunk
- Rotorua Branch
- Thames Branch
