= Geoffrey Murdoch =

New Zealand cricketer (born 1954)

Geoff Murdoch
Personal information
- Full name: Geoffrey Howden Murdoch
- Born: 3 May 1954 (age 72); Dunedin, Otago, New Zealand
- Batting: Right-handed
- Bowling: Right-arm legbreak
- Relatives: Donald Murdoch (father)

Domestic team information
- Years: Team
- 1972/73–1974/75: Southland
- 1974/75: Otago
- Source: ESPNcricinfo, 18 May 2016

Geoffrey Howden Murdoch (born 3 May 1954) is a New Zealand former cricketer. He played five first-class matches for Otago during the 1974–75 season.

Geoff Murdoch was born at Dunedin in 1954, the son of industrial chemist Donald Murdoch. His father had played for Otago during World War II.

After playing age-group cricket for Otago as early as the 1971–72 season, Murdoch played six Hawke Cup matches for Southland between the 1972–73 season and 1974–75. He captained a New Zealand Brabin XI in January 1974 and made his first-class debut for Otago in December of the same year, playing in a Plunket Shield match against Canterbury at Lancaster Park, Christchurch. He went on to play in four more Shield matches and was ever-present for Otago as they won the Shield. He scored a total of 116 runs and took five wickets, but did not feature again for the representative side.
