= Thomas Freeman (New Zealand cricketer) =

New Zealand cricketer

Personal information
- Full name: Thomas Alfred Freeman
- Born: 16 April 1923; Balclutha, New Zealand
- Died: 20 June 2003 (aged 80); Christchurch, New Zealand
- Batting: Right-handed
- Bowling: Right-arm medium
- Relatives: Barry Freeman (son)

Domestic team information
- Years: Team
- 1943/44–1949/50: Otago
- Source: ESPNcricinfo, 10 May 2016

Thomas Alfred Freeman (16 April 1923 – 20 June 2003) was a New Zealand cricketer. He played seventeen first-class matches for Otago between the 1943–44 and 1949–50 seasons.

Freeman was born at Balclutha in Otago in 1923 and educated at Otago Boys' High School in Dunedin. He worked as a teacher. Following his death in 2003 an obituary was published in the 2004 New Zealand Cricket Almanack. Freeman's son, Barry Freeman, also played for Otago.
