= Vernon McArley =

New Zealand cricketer (1923–2019)

Personal information
- Full name: Vernon Aubrey Clinton McArley
- Born: 29 September 1923; Dunedin, New Zealand
- Died: 4 July 2019 (aged 95); Dunedin, New Zealand
- Batting: Right-handed
- Bowling: Right-arm medium

Domestic team information
- Years: Team
- 1947/48–1957/58: Otago
- Source: ESPNcricinfo, 15 May 2016

Vernon Aubrey Clinton McArley (29 September 1923 – 4 July 2019) was a New Zealand cricketer. He played in six first-class matches for Otago between the 1947–48 and 1957–58 seasons.

McArley was born at Dunedin in 1923 and educated at Otago Boys High School in the city. He served in the Royal New Zealand Air Force during World War II and played some cricket whilst in service.

Following the war McArley made his first-class debut for Otago in a March 1948 match against the touring Fiji national cricket team played at Carisbrook. Opening the bowling he took two wickets in the match and made scores of 27 and 11 not out. The 27 runs he scored in his first innings in top-level cricket remained his highest score as a batsman. He went on to play in all four of Otago's 1951–52 Plunket Shield fixtures taking only one wicket, before making a single representative appearance against Canterbury in January 1958, taking three wickets, his best return as a bowler in first-class cricket.

McArley worked as a teacher and then as the principal of DNI school. He died at Dunedin in 2019 at the age of 95.
