= Arthur Mills (cricketer) =

New Zealand cricketer (1923–2001)

Personal information
- Full name: Arthur Stewart Mills
- Born: 20 December 1923; Invercargill, Southland, New Zealand
- Died: 28 December 2001 (aged 78); Auckland, New Zealand
- Batting: Right-handed
- Role: Wicket-keeper

Domestic team information
- Years: Team
- 1947/48: Otago
- 1949/50: Manawatu
- Source: ESPNcricinfo, 17 May 2016

Arthur Stewart Mills (20 December 1923 – 28 December 2001), also known as Dick Mills, was a New Zealand cricketer. He played one first-class match for Otago in the 1947–48 season.

Mills was born at Invercargill in Southland in 1923 and grew up in Dunedin. He worked as a clerk and was a member of the Air Training Corps. He served in World War II in the New Zealand Airforce, qualifying as a pilot in July 1943 before serving in No. 22 Squadron RNZAF where he saw active service in the Pacific. He was promoted to pilot officer in 1944, and later became a professional pilot with the New Zealand National Airways Corporation.

A wicket-keeper, Mills played club cricket for Carisbrook, Old Boys' and Albion Cricket Clubs in Dunedin and was described as a "capable batsman of the forcing type" who was a "distinctly useful" keeper. His only first-class match was a March 1948 fixture for Otago against the touring Fiji side at Carisbrook in Dunedin. He scored 16 runs in the match. In December 1949 he played a single Hawke Cup match for Manawatu against Hutt Valley, scoring a half-century in his side's second innings. As well as cricket, Mills captained the Otago basketball side.

Mills died at Auckland in 2001. He was 78. An obituary was published in the 2005 New Zealand Cricket Almanack.
