= Randell McDonnell =

New Zealand cricketer

Personal information
- Full name: Randell Thomas McDonnell
- Born: 21 August 1843; St Pancras, London, England
- Died: 12 April 1923 (aged 79); Dunedin, Otago, New Zealand
- Role: Batsman

Domestic team information
- Years: Team
- 1864/65: Canterbury
- 1867/68–1875/76: Otago

Career statistics
Competition	First-class
Matches	8
Runs scored	150
Batting average	11.53
100s/50s	0/0
Top score	32
Catches/stumpings	4/–
- Source: ESPNcricinfo, 15 May 2016

Randell Thomas McDonnell or Randall Thomas Macdonnell (21 August 1843 – 12 April 1923) was a New Zealand cricketer. He played eight matches of first-class cricket for Canterbury and Otago between the 1864–65 and 1875–76 seasons.

== Life ==
McDonnell was born in London into a prominent Irish family. He entered the Royal Navy and served at HMS Excellent before moving to New Zealand in the 1860s. He served in the Customs Department, first at Lyttelton and then for many years at Port Chalmers, where he was in charge of the port's customs and immigration. He later worked as a saddler.

He died at Dunedin in April 1923, survived by his wife and their two daughters.

== Cricket career ==
Batting third, McDonnell was Otago's highest scorer against Canterbury in 1868–69, with 29 and 24. A season later, now fourth in the batting order, he was the highest scorer in the match on either side when he scored 32 in Otago's second innings. He gave five chances before he was finally out, and Otago went on to win by four wickets.

McDonnell also umpired one first-class match in 1879 as well as the matches between Canterbury and the touring English team in 1882 and between Otago and the touring Australians in 1886.
