= Des Christian =

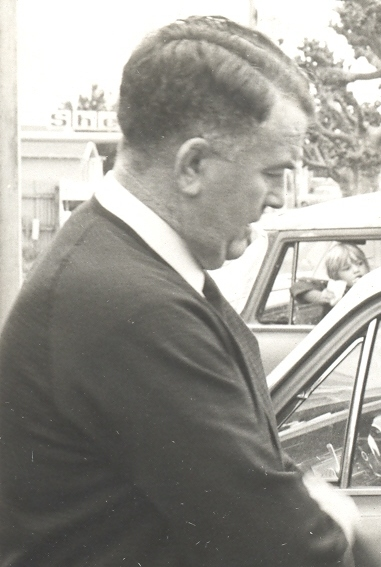
- Christian in 1969
- Born: Desmond Lawrence Christian; 9 September 1923 Auckland, New Zealand
- Died: 30 August 1977 (aged 53) Auckland, New Zealand
- Height: 1.83 m (6 ft 0 in)
- Weight: 89 kg (196 lb)
- Occupation: Hotelier

Rugby union career
- Position(s): Number 8 Prop
Provincial / State sides
Years	Team	Apps	(Points)
1943–50	Auckland	50	
International career
Years	Team	Apps	(Points)
1949	New Zealand	1	(0)
Coaching career
- Years: Team
- Horowhenua

Desmond Lawrence Christian (9 September 1923 – 30 August 1977) was a New Zealand rugby union player and coach. A number 8 and prop, Christian represented Auckland at a provincial level, and was a member of the New Zealand national side, the All Blacks, on their 1949 tour of South Africa. He played 11 matches for the All Blacks on that tour, including one international. He later coached the Horowhenua representative team, and was a selector for the North Island (1963–69) and national (1964–66) sides.
