= Stan Cowman =

New Zealand cricket umpire

Personal information
- Born: 14 April 1923; Yorkshire, England
- Died: 2 February 2003 (aged 79); Upper Hutt, New Zealand

Umpiring information
- ODIs umpired: 2 (1983)
- WODIs umpired: 2 (1982–1986)
- Source: Cricinfo, 17 May 2014

Stanley Corbett Cowman (14 April 1923 – 2 February 2003) was a New Zealand cricket umpire. In his international umpiring career, he stood in two ODI games in 1983. He was also an honorary curator of the New Zealand Cricket Museum at the Basin Reserve. At the age of 18, he was a flight lieutenant for No. 59 Squadron of the Royal Air Force.

== See also ==
- List of One Day International cricket umpires
