= Sarah Higgins =

NZ homemaker, midwife, community leader, writer

Sarah Higgins (30 January 1830 – 23 September 1923) was a New Zealand homemaker, midwife, community leader and writer. She was born in Lydden, Kent, England on 30 January 1830.

== Early life ==
Sarah was the youngest child of five, born to Stephen Sharp and his wife Mary Ann Emery, who died in October 1833 when Sarah was only 2. Her father remarried in June 1834 however in October 1834, her step-mother too died in childbirth, along with her baby, a year to the week from when Sarah's mother had died. Sarah's grandparents then moved in with the family. Sarah received a basic education, including sewing and reading, however did not learn to write.

When Sarah was eleven, her father answered an appeal for skilled manual labourers to emigrate to New Zealand in the employ of the New Zealand Company, an independent company revived by Edward Gibbon Wakefield, who became Director. The New Zealand Company primarily required young married couples perhaps with a young family, or older couples with grown or near grown children, who had manual skills such as carpentry, farming, labourers, builders, millers and so on, who could contribute to building the new colonies on land purchased by the Company and sold as stakes to the emigrants and to increase the future population. Stephen Higgins was initially turned down on application due to his widower status, however doctors intervened and wrote a letter to the company directors instructing them of the ill-health of Sarah's older sister, and confirming that they could do nothing further for her, but advising that it was in the professional opinion that the fresh air of New Zealand would be of profound benefit to her prognosis. Stephen Sharp was accepted. He sold his belongings and used the money to purchase his stake and assisted passage.

== New Zealand ==
The Sharps - Stephen, Susannah aged 21, Robert aged 18, George aged 12 and Sarah aged 11 left Dover on board the Bolton in October 1841, the journey taking five months. Susannah Sharp died aboard the Bolton on the voyage and was buried at sea. The remaining family arrived in New Zealand on 15 March 1842, in what is now Lambton harbour close to Nelson Colony, Wellington. The Sharps were initially sent to make shelter in one of the communal buildings, put together for the newly arriving colonists. They remained there for some time, sleeping on a rough bed of ferns, with borrowed blankets. Because of the number of arriving ships, and the shallow nature of the harbour, ships were unable to pull into the quayside area, and so were forced to anchor offshore. Passengers disembarked and made land by means of small craft, being forced to leave their belongings behind on board until such times as they could be transferred to shore.

The land that they were alleged to have bought was later subject to disagreement between the New Zealand Company and the local Maori chiefs from whom they claimed to have purchased. The stakes they had sold were described in the advertisement as being within an area of rich agricultural land, ideal for cultivation of crops and fruit trees. The initial stakeholders for the most part had no intentions of physically making the journey to New Zealand to take up the land, and so in a hasty spot of double-dealing, the company had distributed these claims to the arriving settlers, in the hope that more land could be negotiated from the Maori. The land however was poor, and swampy, covered in wild grasses, ferns and bush which would need clearing before any building or cultivation could begin, and contrary to the images of the town plan, which showed cleared flat ground, the majority of the stakes were hidden amongst undulating higher ground.

The continuing disagreement with the Maori descended into violence in 1843, following the British Government's intervention and the signing of the Treaty of Waitangi. This in effect placed further purchases of land on hold and called the validity of the existing sales into question. Violence followed, with the Wairau Affray during which the local council leader, Captain Arthur Wakefield, brother of Edward Gibbon Wakefield, was killed along with 21 others. Sarah recalls the incident with vivid yet simple horror. The effects were dreadful for the settlers in the town.. Not only were they concerned with further reprisals, but the death of their leader and main employer meant the work building the roads and houses stopped, and wages with it. Hunger became an issue and Sarah recalls local Maoris trying to assist by selling them a few vegetables, and teaching them which berries and fruits were safe to eat. Despite this, many of the new settlers were forced to leave their stakes and transfer some miles away to another settlement in Spring Grove. Sarah's family were one of them.

Having arrived in 1842 with no housekeeping skills whatsoever, it fell to Sarah as the only female of the house to learn the skills required to run the house; she took it upon herself to visit neighboring women and watch them cooking and cleaning to learn how to perform the duties in her own home. Her first attempt at cooking a meal for her father almost ended in disaster when she made him a pancake. Whilst tossing it to cook the underside, the pancake fell out of the pan into the ashes by the fire. Her father laughed and told her she was not as clever as she thought, but ate the pancake nonetheless. She took in sewing to earn a few extra shillings. Following their move to Spring Grove, Stephen Sharp was given work as a farm overseer which necessitated his being away from home between Monday and Saturday each week. With both of her brothers also out at work, Sarah was offered a position as a live-in domestic help to a slightly wealthier family, the Ottersons in nearby Richmond. Sarah remained with the family for 14 months, and used the time to learn a variety of skills, which she later put to good use, including butter making, in the family dairy and cooking. During her time with the Ottersons, Sarah was courted by a young man from Spring Grove, Sydney Higgins who worked as a sawyer. Following her release from the service of the Ottersons, as Sarah's father returned home, Sarah moved back to Spring Grove and she and Sydney married in 1849. They purchased a small plot of land, and a few cattle and pigs, and built a small one roomed house. Over the following few years, they expanded the home to include a large kitchen, and Sarah helped her husband grow and harvest the crops, and tend the animals. Their family started to grow, and soon they moved to a larger plot and again built a home, including a dairy where Sarah made butter. Her father and brothers bought the land adjoining.

== Midwife and writer ==
As her family grew, Sarah earned extra income by renting out rooms to disabled boarders, and took in sewing. She also went out with a local doctor, assisting him on his patient visits. She learned basic nursing skills which she later used to set herself up as a midwife. As her daughters grew older, they assisted her. It is thought Sarah delivered around 350 babies in the Nelson/ Spring Grove areas. Sydney and Sarah had eleven children, all of whom survived and grew to adulthood. As they left home, they remained in the area. In 1903 Sydney died suddenly, leaving Sarah a widow at the age of 73; a year later following the movement of her last children to other areas, Sarah was finally forced to learn to write, in order to be able to communicate with them. When in her early 80s Sarah wrote with amazing clarity a history of her life, which was later put into a collection of stories of the first female pioneers of the frontier colonies of the nineteenth century and published in 1961.

On 23 September 1923, Sarah Higgins died aged 93. Her life as one of the first settlers of the new colonies in New Zealand covered 81 years, accounted for the inception of the country as part of the British empire, and ended as the empire reached its twilight. Three years after her death, New Zealand was given British Dominion status. Her personal account of her life as an emigrant is simple yet detailed, and demonstrates a profound insight into the trials and hardships of a young girl living on the edge of a new frontier.
