= Frank Wright (artist) =

New Zealand artist (1860–1923)

- Born: 1860; Nottingham, England
- Died: 1 August 1923 (aged 62–63); Auckland, New Zealand
- Known for: watercolour paintings

Frank Wright (1860 – 1 August 1923) was an English-born New Zealand artist, active from the 1880s to the 1920s. He is best known for his watercolour paintings, particularly those depicting scenes of New Zealand bush. His younger brother Walter was also a notable artist.

== Early life ==
Frank Wright was born in Nottingham, England, in 1860 to a designer of laces and his wife. He studied art at the South Kensington School of Art under J. S. Rawle, a Fellow of the Royal Society of Arts, and achieved some success in design competitions. In 1877, following the death of his father, he and his mother and younger brother Walter emigrated to New Zealand. The family settled in Auckland and Wright worked as a furniture packer on Shortland Street, an area where there were several artist shops and studios. From 1885, he exhibited at the Auckland Society of Arts (ASA) and a few years later began to teach painting. In 1894, his brother Walter, with whom he had set up a studio at Victoria Arcade in Auckland, returned to England, where he studied art at Heatherley Art School for three years.

== Professional career ==
While Walter was in England, Wright continued teaching art from his studio in Auckland and exhibiting at the ASA. He also organised field trips for other artists for the purpose of making sketches and displaying the resulting work at an gallery on Auckland's Lorne Street. His work was well regarded, with one contemporary reviewer regarding a work exhibited at the ASA in 1890 as being "the finest piece of watercolour the writer has seen in the Colonies".

In 1907, Frank and Walter, the latter now back in New Zealand, traveled around the country making a series of watercolours, 75 in all, that were published the following year as illustrations for William Pember Reeves' book, New Zealand. More of their work was published in Frank Fox's Oceania in 1911. Primarily interested in executing watercolour landscapes, particularly scenes in the New Zealand bush, Frank also collaborated with Walter on other topics; their work The Canoe Builders, made in 1915, was gifted to the Auckland Art Gallery by Sir James Parr, the mayor of Auckland.

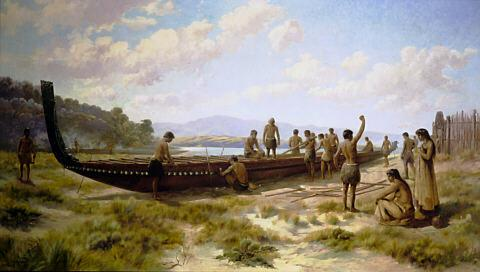
Wright collaborated with his brother Walter to produce The Canoe Builders in 1915; it is in the collection of the Auckland Art Gallery

== Later life ==
Wright died of pneumonia in Auckland on 1 August 1923. His last exhibition at the ASA had only taken place a few weeks previously. His work was displayed in the New Zealand Centennial Exhibition of 1940. In 1986, his painting Kahikatea Forest near Taupiri, Waikato, New Zealand, made in 1903, was prevented from leaving New Zealand under the Antiquities Act, legislation intended to prevent items deemed to be important to New Zealand from being taken or shipped overseas.
