= The Romance of Sleepy Hollow =

1923 film

- Directed by: Henry J. Makepeace
- Written by: Henry J. Makepeace
- Produced by: Henry J. Makepeace
- Starring: Francis X. Bouzaid; June Phillips
- Release date: 1923
- Running time: 80 minutes
- Country: New Zealand
- Language: English

The Romance of Sleepy Hollow is a 1923 New Zealand film written and directed by Henry J. Makepeace, and produced and shot in Auckland. The film is now lost, with a poster the only surviving material. The poster says it is “A Bright Sparkling Comedy-Drama in Four Reels .... The first to be produced in New Zealand,”. The film was to open at “The Grand” theatre in central Auckland opposite the G.P.O. on 22 August 1924.

Sam Edwards says it may have been a melodrama set in Auckland, as the poster says "Maoriland Pictures presents Francis X. Bouzaid of Onehunga and June Phillips of Dominion Road" supported by four other local couples. It was shot on 35 mm, was silent, and black and white. The film was submitted to the censor in November 1923, who required the removal of some 900 feet (around 15 minutes). This reduced the film from 5700 feet to 4800 feet or about 80 minutes. Nothing now remains of the film apart from the poster.
