= Jim McCormick (rugby union) =

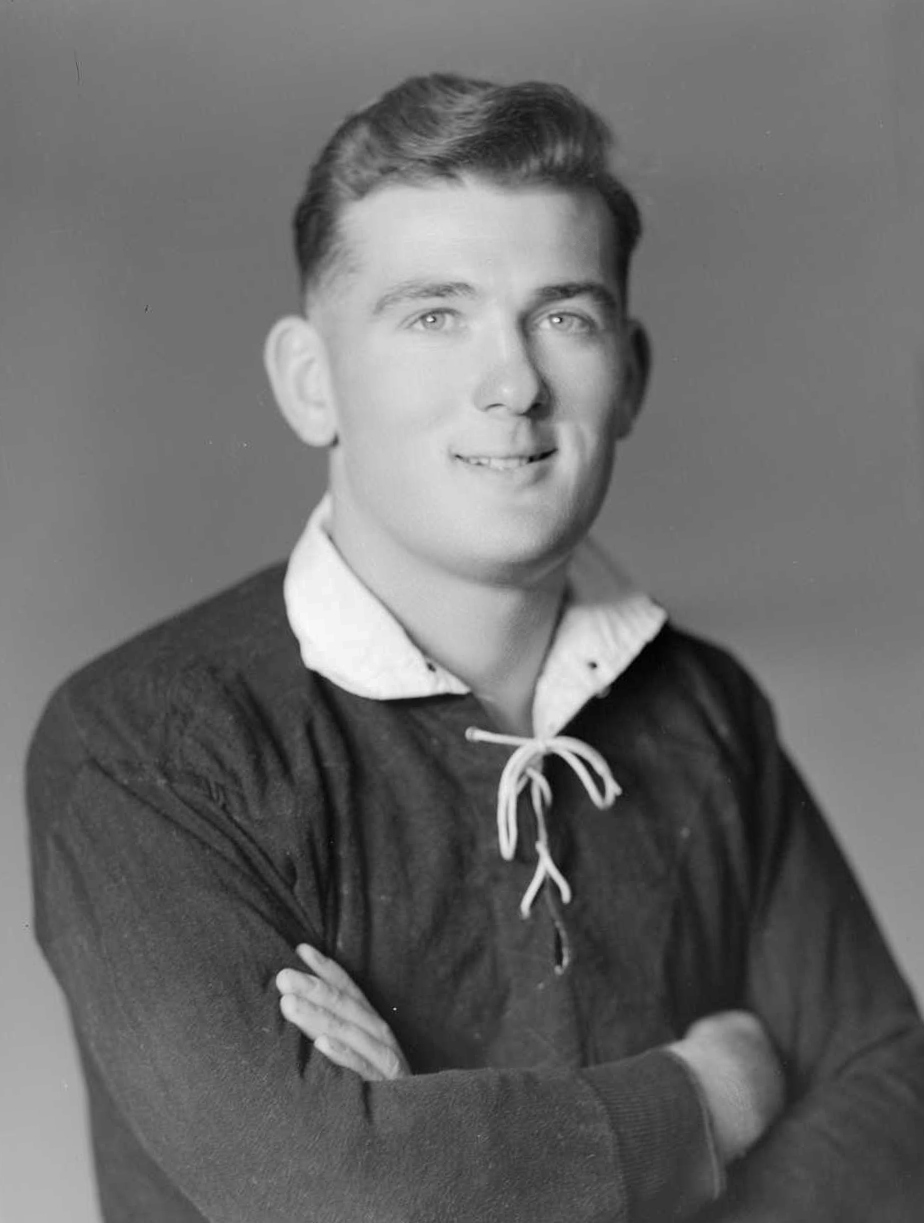
- McCormick in 1949
- Born: James McCormick; 15 October 1923 Waipukurau, New Zealand
- Died: 8 December 2006 (aged 83) Waipukurau, New Zealand
- Height: 1.83 m (6 ft 0 in)
- Weight: 89 kg (196 lb)
- School: Scots College
- Occupation: Farmer

Rugby union career
- Position: Hooker
Provincial / State sides
Years	Team	Apps	(Points)
1944	Wairarapa		
1946–49	Hawke's Bay		
International career
Years	Team	Apps	(Points)
1947	New Zealand	0	(0)

James McCormick (15 October 1923 – 8 December 2006) was a New Zealand rugby union player. A hooker, McCormick represented Wairarapa and Hawke's Bay at a provincial level. He was a member of the New Zealand national side, the All Blacks, on their 1947 tour of Australia. He played three matches on that tour but did not appear in any internationals.
