= William Wescombe Corpe =

William Wescombe Corpe (29 April 1836 – 26 March 1923) was a New Zealand clerk, station manager, sawmiller, storekeeper and in particular, dairy manufacturer. He was born in Stoke St Gregory, Somerset, England on 29 April 1836.
