= Henry Lawson (cricketer) =

New Zealand cricketer

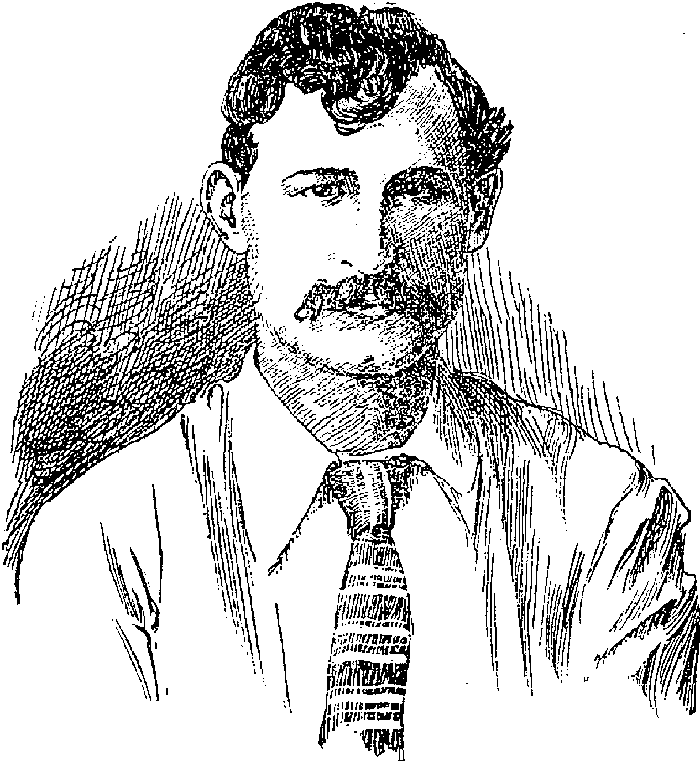

Personal information
- Full name: Henry Wallace Lawson
- Born: 1865; Sydney, Australia
- Died: 12 January 1941 (aged 75); Mount Eden, Auckland, New Zealand
- Bowling: Right-arm medium
- Role: Bowler

Domestic team information
- Years: Team
- 1883/84–1889/90: Wellington
- 1891/92–1897/98: Auckland

Career statistics
Competition	First-class
Matches	17
Runs scored	257
Batting average	10.70
100s/50s	0/0
Top score	38
Balls bowled	2,059
Wickets	58
Bowling average	12.03
5 wickets in innings	5
10 wickets in match	3
Best bowling	7/25
Catches/stumpings	6/–
- Source: Cricinfo, 15 June 2016

Henry Wallace Lawson (1865 – 12 January 1941) was a New Zealand cricketer. He played first-class cricket for Auckland and Wellington between 1883 and 1898.

An accurate right-arm medium-pace bowler, Lawson took 5 for 13 and 5 for 17 on his first-class debut for Wellington in Nelson in 1883–84, but still finished on the losing side to Nelson by 39 runs. When Nelson visited Wellington the next season he took 3 for 25 and 7 for 25, this time in the winning side. Earlier that season he had taken 5 for 68 and 6 for 70 in a drawn match against Auckland. He was less successful after he moved to Auckland in the early 1890s.

Lawson married Margaret Short in 1888. They had one daughter. He died at his home in the Auckland suburb of Mount Eden in January 1941, aged 75.
