= Ed Nichols =

New Zealand alpine skier (1923–2020)

Personal information
- Born: 11 October 1923 Knutsford, Cheshire, England
- Died: 17 December 2020 (aged 97) Christchurch, New Zealand

Sport
- Country: New Zealand
- Sport: Alpine skiing
- Club: Canterbury Winter Sports Club

Edward Nichols (11 October 1923 – 17 December 2020) was a New Zealand alpine skier who represented his country at the 1980 Winter Paralympics.

== Biography ==
Born in Knutsford, Cheshire, England on 11 October 1923, Nichols grew up with his mother, who was a butcher, and older sister in a single-parent family. At the age of 17 years, he was involved in a motorcycle accident that led to his left leg being amputated below the knee. He bought his own butcher's shop, which he ran for about four years, before emigrating to New Zealand in 1949.

After settling in Christchurch, Nichols married Shirley Margaret Cocks in December 1950, and the couple went on to have five children. During their working lives, Ed and Shirley Nichols owned seven butchers' shops, and also managed a number of stores for the Canterbury Frozen Meat Company.

Nichols was already a capable ice skater when he arrived in New Zealand, and after joining the Canterbury Winter Sports Club based at Mount Cheeseman, he also became an accomplished alpine skier, winning the club downhill title. In 1980, Nichols represented New Zealand in the men's 2A class giant slalom and slalom at the 1980 Winter Paralympics in Geilo, Norway.

Nichols died in Christchurch on 17 December 2020, having been predeceased by his wife, Shirley, in 2018.
