= Donald Murdoch (cricketer) =

New Zealand cricketer

Personal information
- Full name: Donald Howden Murdoch
- Born: 27 March 1923; Lawrence, Otago, New Zealand
- Died: 28 February 2014 (aged 90); Dunedin, Otago, New Zealand
- Batting: Left-handed
- Bowling: Right-arm legbreak
- Relatives: Geoff Murdoch (son)

Domestic team information
- Years: Team
- 1943/44–1944/45: Otago
- Source: Cricinfo, 18 May 2016

Donald Howden Murdoch (27 March 1923 – 28 February 2014) was a New Zealand cricketer. He played three first-class matches for Otago in the 1943–44 and 1944–45 seasons.

Murdoch was born at Lawrence in Otago in 1923 and was educated at Kings High School in Dunedin. He graduated from the University of Otago in 1944 with a science degree. He made his representative debut for Otago in a Christmas Day fixture against Canterbury in 1943, opening the batting and making scores of 28 and 22 in a match Otago lost by an innings. His other two top-level appearances came the following season in matches against Canterbury and Wellington. He scored a total of 78 runs, with the 28 he scored on debut his highest first-class score.

As well as cricket, Murdoch played rugby as a first five-eighth. He was described as "outstanding" as a school's player and considered as promising as his older brother Ian. He played representative rugby for Otago after World War II―a 1947 newspaper report describing his display against Wairarapa as "brilliant", including a "spectacular break" which led to a try.

Murdoch worked as an industrial chemist and was the general manager of the Southland Co-operative Phosphate Company in the 1980s. He died at Dunedin in 2014 aged 90. His son, Geoff Murdoch, also played for Otago, making five first-class appearances for the side in the 1974–75 season.
