= Robert Harwood (cricketer) =

New Zealand cricketer (1923–1992)

Personal information
- Full name: Robert Crawford Hardwood
- Born: 20 November 1923; Dunedin, Otago, New Zealand
- Died: 23 November 1992 (aged 69); Christchurch, Canterbury, New Zealand
- Batting: Left-handed
- Bowling: Slow left-arm orthodox

Domestic team information
- Years: Team
- 1944/45–1945/46: Otago
- Source: ESPNcricinfo, 13 May 2016

Robert Crawford Harwood (20 November 1923 – 23 November 1992) was a New Zealand cricketer. He played five first-class matches for Otago during the 1944–45 and 1945–46 seasons.

Harwood was born at Dunedin in 1923 and grew up in the Caversham area of the city. He attended Caversham School and played club cricket for the Carisbrook side.

During World War II Harwood was drafted into the New Zealand Army in 1942, serving in 27th Machine-Gun Battalion. He played services cricket and played all five of his first-class matches for Otago during the period that he was enlisted. He made his first-class debut in a December 1944 wartime match against Canterbury at Lancaster Park in Christchurch, scoring only three runs during the match. He did not bowl in the match, a decision which the cricket correspondent of the Otago Daily Times found strange given that he was considered "one of the most promising left-hand bowlers in Otago". He was twelfth man for the side's next first-class match against Wellington, but recalled when it played Canterbury again in February, although the same paper remarked that his bowling in the match was "never impressive".

The following season Harwood played in all three of Otago's matches in the Plunket Shield, as well as in the annual match against Southland. An all-rounder deemed "promising" by the Otago Daily Times, Harwood scored a total of 60 runs with a highest score of 24, and took seven wickets in his five first-class matches.

Harwood played cricket whilst serving in Jayforce in Japan following the end of the war, but did not play again for the Otago representative side after being demobilised in 1948. He did continue to play club cricket, played for the Otago Second XI in a 1957 match against a touring Australian side from Rockdale and was chosen in the provincial practice squad ahead of the 1957–58 and 1959–60 Plunket Shield competitions, but did not make another senior appearance for the side.

Harwood died at Christchurch in 1992 aged 69. An obituary was published in the 1995 edition of the New Zealand Cricket Almanack.
