= Frederick Stanley (cricketer) =

New Zealand cricketer

Personal information
- Full name: Frederick William Stanley
- Born: 5 November 1923; Dunedin, Otago, New Zealand
- Died: 22 October 1993 (aged 69); Dunedin, Otago, New Zealand
- Batting: Right-handed
- Bowling: Right-arm medium

Domestic team information
- Years: Team
- 1950/51–1953/54: Otago
- 1952/53: Dunedin Metropolitan

Career statistics
Competition	First-class
Matches	13
Runs scored	104
Batting average	6.93
100s/50s	0/0
Top score	28
Balls bowled	2,332
Wickets	46
Bowling average	24.08
5 wickets in innings	3
10 wickets in match	0
Best bowling	5/25
Catches/stumpings	2/–
- Source: Cricinfo, 24 April 2024

Frederick William Stanley (5 November 1923 – 22 October 1993) was a New Zealand cricketer. He played first-class cricket for Otago between the 1950–51 and 1953–54 seasons.

Stanley was born at Dunedin in 1923. He worked as an upholsterer. A right-arm medium-pace bowler who played club cricket for Kaikorai in Dunedin, Stanley made his first-class debut for Otago in a January 1951 Plunket Shield match against Wellington at Carisbrook. Opening the bowling, he went wicketless in Wellington's first innings but took a five-wicket haul in the second innings as the side was dismissed for a score of only 82―a performance described by The Press as "brilliant bowling".

He played against the touring England Test team later in the season and went on to play regularly for the representative side for four seasons, taking a total of 46 wickets, including another two five-wicket hauls.

Stanley died at Dunedin in 1993. He was aged 69. An obituary was published in the New Zealand Cricket Almanack in 1994.
