= Frederick George Radcliffe =

- Born: 15 November 1863; Liverpool, Lancashire, England
- Died: 14 January 1923 (aged 59); Onerahi, Whangārei, New Zealand
- Occupations: Farmer, photographer

Frederick George Radcliffe (15 November 1863 – 14 January 1923) was a New Zealand farmer and photographer.

Radcliffe was born in Liverpool, Lancashire, England on 15 November 1863.

Radcliffe died on 14 January 1923, aged 59, in Onerahi, Whangārei, New Zealand.

Radcliffe came to New Zealand from England in the early 1890s. Soon afterwards his wife, Kate, and their two daughters, Harriette and Olive, joined him at his farm 'Utopia' near Paparoa, on an inlet of the Kaipara Harbour.

Radcliffe's interest in photography grew and he quickly acquired a reputation as an exceptional scenic photographer. For twenty years he traveled the country taking photographs of small rural towns, large cities, rivers, gardens, buildings, beaches, wharves, forests, lakes and streets. From 1909, with the help of Kate and Olive, he operated a successful postcard business from his home in Whangārei. Radcliffe played the oboe, conducted local orchestras and was an active member of various music-related clubs in his community. He died at Onerahi, Whangārei, in 1923.

Examples of Radcliffe's photography can be accessed via the Auckland Libraries' database Heritage Images.

Selection of photographs taken by Frederick George Radcliffe

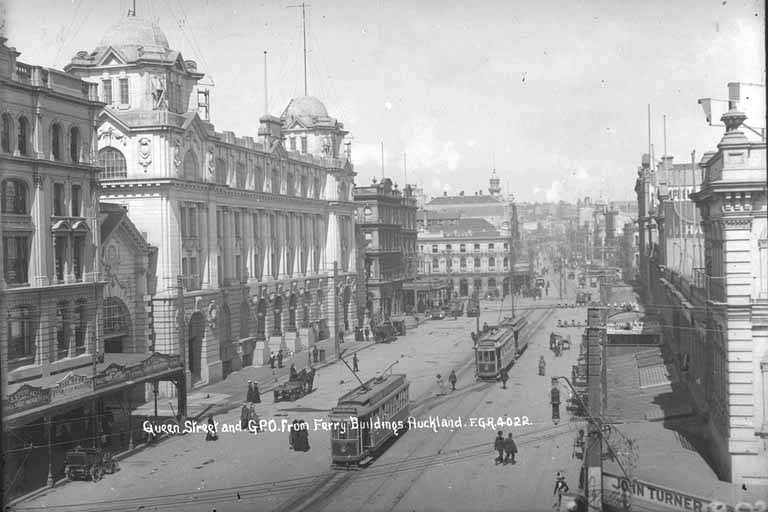
Lower Queen Street, Auckland, 1910–1919

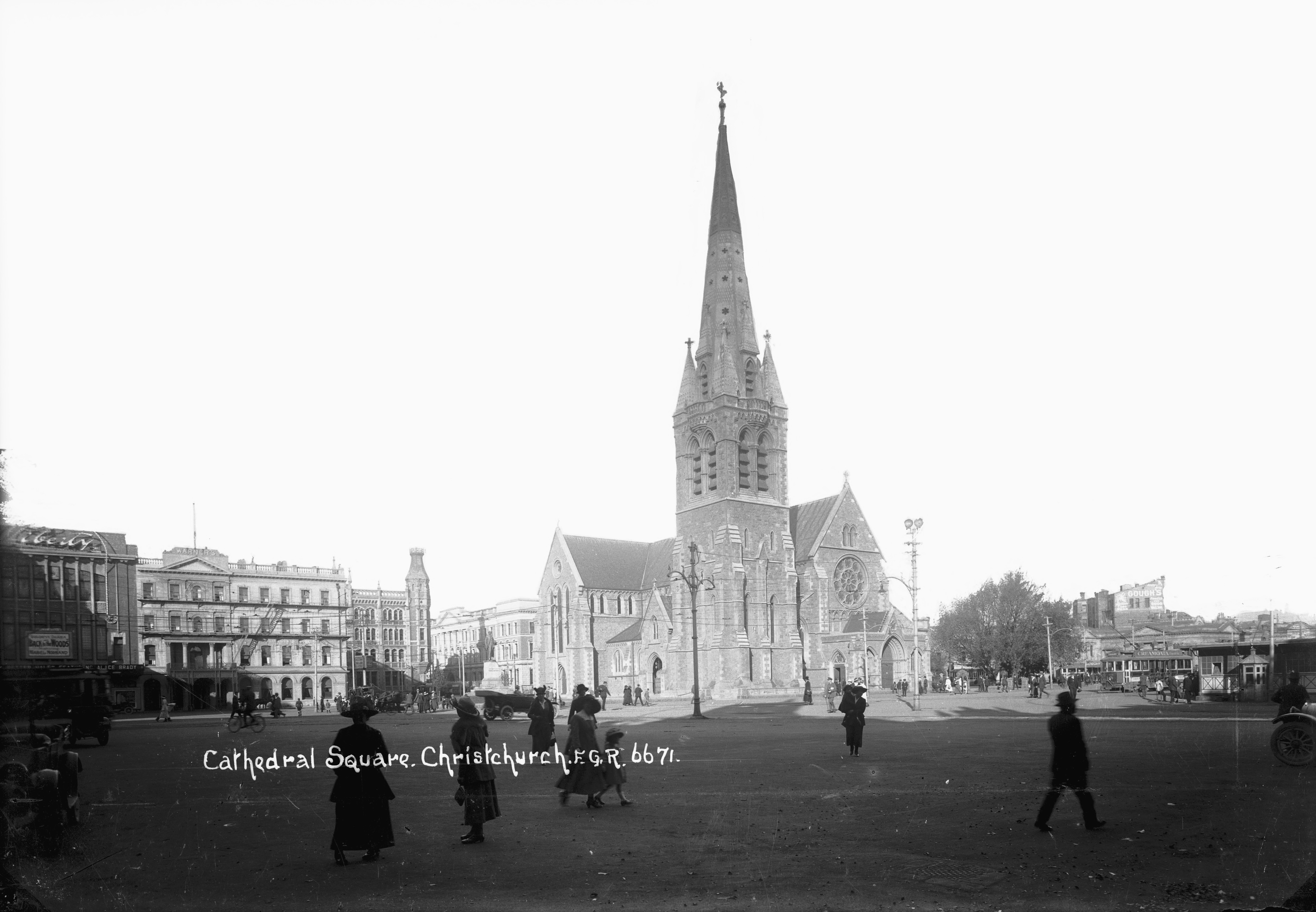
ChristChurch Cathedral, Christchurch, 1912

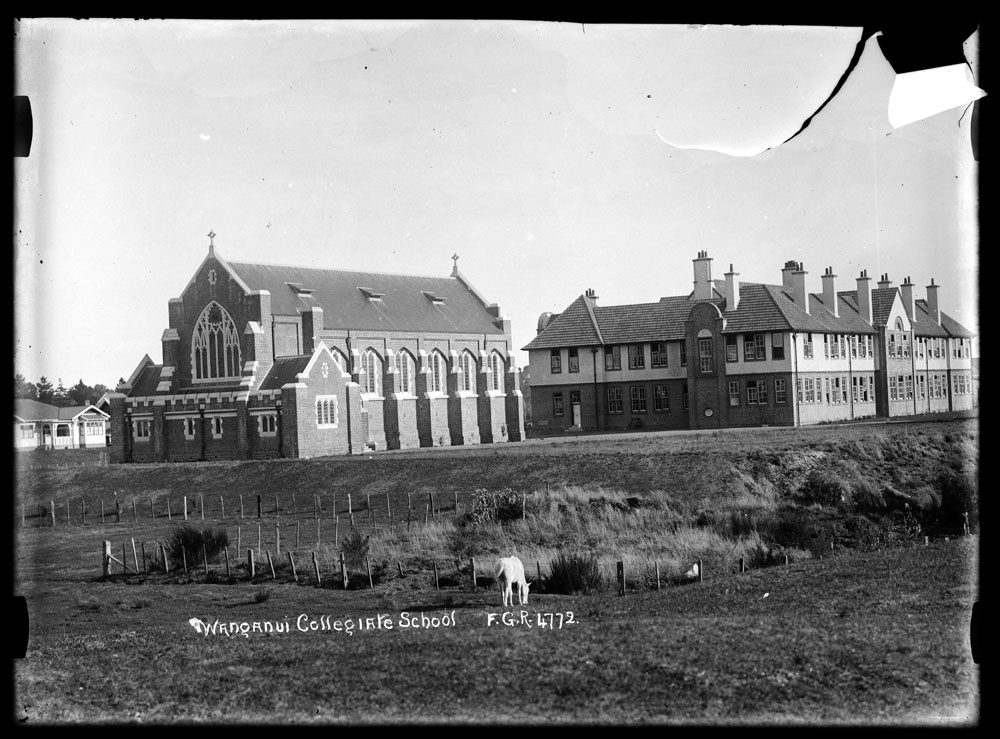
Wanganui Collegiate School and chapel, 1912

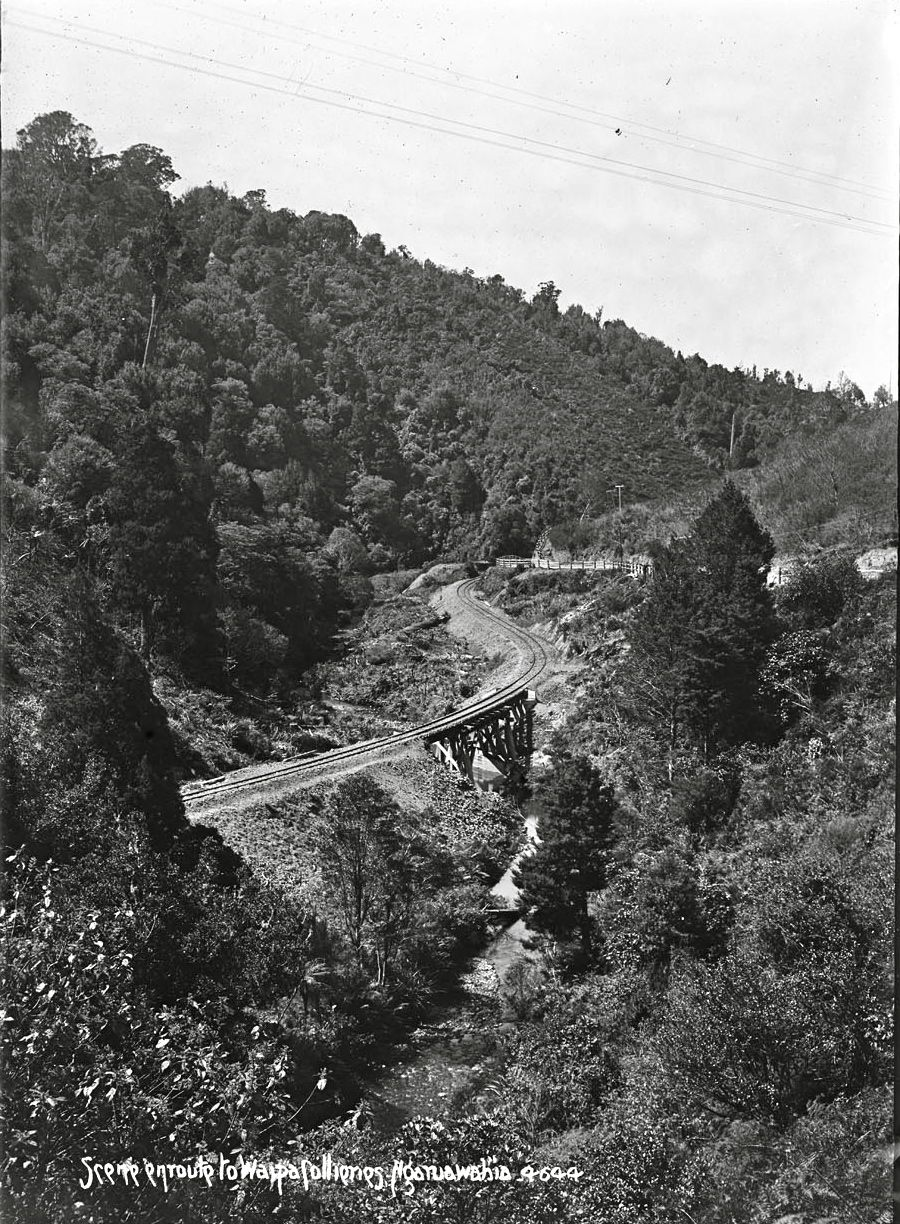
Glen Massey Line undated photo of a bridge over Firewood Creek, probably about 1917
