= 1928 in New Zealand =

- Decades: 1900s; 1910s; 1920s; 1930s; 1940s
- See also: History of New Zealand; List of years in New Zealand; Timeline of New Zealand history

The following lists events that happened during 1928 in New Zealand.

== Population ==
- Estimated population as of 31 December: 1,467,400.
- Increase since previous 31 December 1927: 17,000 (1.17%).
- Males per 100 females: 104.2.

== Incumbents ==
=== Regal and viceregal ===
- Head of state – George V
- Governor-General – Charles Fergusson

=== Government ===
The 22nd New Zealand Parliament concluded.

- Speaker of the House – Charles Statham (Independent)
- Prime Minister – Gordon Coates (Reform) until 10 December, then Joseph Ward (United)
- Minister of Finance – William Downie Stewart (Reform) until 10 December, then Joseph Ward (United)
- Minister of Foreign Affairs – Gordon Coates (Reform) until 10 December, then Joseph Ward (United)

=== Parliamentary opposition ===
- Leader of the Opposition – Harry Holland (Labour) until 18 October, then Joseph Ward (United) from 4 to 10 December, then Gordon Coates (Reform).

=== Judiciary ===
- Chief Justice – Sir Charles Skerrett

=== Main centre leaders ===
- Mayor of Auckland – George Baildon
- Mayor of Wellington – George Troup
- Mayor of Christchurch – John Archer
- Mayor of Dunedin – William Taverner

== Events ==
- New Zealand signs its first bilateral trade agreement, with Japan.
- 10 January: George Hood and John Moncrieff attempt the first flight from Australia to New Zealand in an aircraft named Aotearoa, but radio signals cease after 12 hours and they are never seen again.
- 14 July: The schooner Isabella de Fraine capsizes on the bar at the entrance to Hokianga harbour, with the loss of all eight crew.
- 24 October: The Weekly Press stops publishing. The magazine started in 1865.

== Arts and literature ==
See 1928 in art, 1928 in literature, Category:1928 books

=== Music ===
See: 1928 in music

=== Radio ===
See: Public broadcasting in New Zealand

=== Film ===
- Taranga / Under the Southern Cross / The Devil's Pit

See: Category:1928 film awards, 1928 in film, List of New Zealand feature films, Cinema of New Zealand, Category:1928 films

== Sport ==
=== Badminton ===
- National champions
  - Men's singles: T. Kelly
  - Women's singles: E. Hetley
  - Men's doubles: R. Creed-Meredith and L. Wilson
  - Women's doubles: E. Hetley and F. Harvey
  - Mixed doubles: Mr and Mrs E. Dart

=== Chess ===
The 37th National Chess Championship was held in Christchurch, and was won by A.W.O. Davies of Auckland, his fourth title.

=== Golf ===
- The 18th New Zealand Open championship was won by Sloan Morpeth, an amateur.
- The 32nd National Amateur Championships were held in Otago
  - Men: T.H. Horton (Masterton) - 2nd title
  - Women: Mrs ? Chrystal

=== Horse racing ===
==== Harness racing ====
- New Zealand Trotting Cup – Peter Bingen
- Auckland Trotting Cup – Gold Jacket

==== Thoroughbred racing ====
- New Zealand Cup – Oratrix
- Avondale Gold Cup – Bisox
- Auckland Cup – Corinax
- Wellington Cup – Star Stranger
- New Zealand Derby – Nightmarch

=== Lawn bowls ===
The national outdoor lawn bowls championships are held in Christchurch.

- Men's singles champion – J. Scott (Caledonian Bowling Club)
- Men's pair champions – D. Dumphy, G. Logan (skip) (Maitai Bowling Club)
- Men's fours champions – F. Kettle, V. Langley, D. Hutchison, W. Foster (skip) (Caledonian Bowling Club)

=== Olympic Games ===
Gold	Silver	Bronze	Total
1	0	0	1

- Ted Morgan wins a gold medal in boxing at the 1928 Summer Olympics in Amsterdam, becoming the first New Zealander to win an individual Olympic gold medal while competing for New Zealand.

=== Rugby ===
Category:Rugby union in New Zealand, Category:New Zealand international rugby union players

- Ranfurly Shield. The season started with Canterbury holding the shield, and they defended it against South Canterbury (29-9) before losing it to Wairarapa (7-8). Wairarapa held the shield for the remainder of the season, beating Bush (57-11), Marlborough (26-8), Wellington (9-3) and Manawhenua (31-10).

=== Rugby league ===
- Tour of New Zealand by Great Britain, who win the test series 2-1
  - 1st Test, Dunedin, GB 6-5
  - 2nd Test, Christchurch, GB 13 - 5
  - 3rd test, Auckland, NZ 17 - 13

=== Soccer ===
- 1928 Chatham Cup won by Petone
- Provincial league champions:
  - Auckland: Tramways
  - Canterbury: Western
  - Hawke's Bay: Napier Rangers
  - Nelson: Athletic
  - Otago: Maori Hill
  - South Canterbury: Colmoco
  - Southland: Corinthians
  - Taranaki: Caledonian
  - Waikato: Pukemiro Junction
  - Wanganui: KP's
  - Wellington: YMCA

== Births ==
=== January ===
- 4 January – Tom Ah Chee, businessman (died 2000)
- 19 January – Dorothy Jelicich, trade unionist, politician (died 2015)
- 21 January – Ron Scott, sports administrator (died 2016)

=== February ===
- 1 February – John Dawson, botanist (died 2019)
- 3 February – Bill Crump, cricketer
- 5 February – Iain Campbell, cricketer, schoolteacher (died 2015)
- 9 February – George Groombridge, politician (died 2022)
- 15 February – David Hall, chemist (died 2016)
- 16 February – Murray Muir, cricketer (died 2004)
- 17 February – Larry Savage, rugby union player (died 2013)
- 19 February – Marti Friedlander, photographer (died 2016)
- 23 February – Taini Jamison, netball player and coach (died 2023)
- 26 February – Douglas St. John, cricketer (died 1992)
- 27 February – Yvonne Cartier, ballet dancer and instructor, mime (died 2014)
- 29 February
  - Ed Latter, politician (died 2016)
  - Alan Loveday, violinist (died 2016)

=== March ===
- 2 March – Don Richardson, musical arranger, producer and promoter, bandleader (died 2008)
- 16 March
  - Johnny Dodd, rugby league player (died 2007)
  - Leslie Swindale, soil scientist (died 2022)
- 17 March – Patricia Bartlett, pro-censorship activist (died 2000)
- 21 March – Boyce Richardson, journalist, author, filmmaker (died 2020)
- 22 March – Peter Malone, veterinary surgeon, politician (died 2006)
- 23 March – Allan Hubbard, businessman (died 2011)
- 31 March
  - Herbert Familton, alpine skier (died 2002)
  - Maurice Goodall, Anglican bishop died 2010)

=== April ===
- 3 April – Ralph Matthews, Anglican bishop (died 1983)
- 5 April – David Farquhar, composer, music academic (died 2007)
- 6 April
  - Ivan Armstrong, field hockey player and coach, tennis umpire, schoolteacher (died 2014)
  - Dave Dephoff, athlete (died 2014)
- 11 April – James Gill, cricketer (died 2019)
- 18 April – Abe Jacobs, wrestler (died 2023 in the United States)
- 21 April – Ian Brooks, politician (died 2022)
- 26 April – Shayle R. Searle, statistician (died 2013)
- 27 April – John Brown, cricket umpire (died 2005)

=== May ===
- 1 May – Tim Francis, diplomat (died 2016)
- 4 May – Tim Hewat, television producer and journalist (died 2004)
- 6 May – Heather Robson, badminton and tennis player (died 2019)
- 16 May – Emily Mair, opera singer, pianist and vocal coach (died 2021)
- 24 May – Jane Galletly, television scriptwriter (died 2017)
- 25 May – Christopher Rollinson, boxer (died 1988)

=== June ===
- 2 June – Ray Watters, geographer (died 2024)
- 3 June – John Richard Reid, cricketer (died 2020)
- 4 June – Whakahuihui Vercoe, Anglican archbishop (died 2007)
- 27 June – Annette Johnson, alpine skier (died 2017)

=== July ===
- 4 July – Peter Mander, sailor, businessman (died 1998)
- 6 July – Pakaariki Harrison, tohunga whakairo (died 2008)
- 10 July – Janet Shackleton, hurdler (died 2021)
- 12 July
  - Pixie Williams, singer (died 2013)
  - Peter Yaxley, rugby league player and referee (died 2015)
- 23 July – Charles Thomas, architect (died 2022)
- 24 July – Shirley Hardman, athlete (died 2019)
- 28 July
  - Edward Raymond Horton, convicted murderer (died 1977)
  - Roy Moore, rugby league player (died 2022)

=== August ===
- 10 August – Dorrie Parker, athlete (died 1993)
- 14 August – John Stoke, occupational medicine expert, public servant (died 2000)
- 30 August – Mayzod Reid, diver (died 2001)

=== September ===
- 4 September – Kerry Ashby, rower (died 2015)
- 9 September – Edward Somers, jurist (died 2002)
- 18 September
  - Basil Arthur, politician (died 1985)
  - Arthur Berry, cricketer (died 2016)
- 19 September – Kevin Stuart, rugby union player (died 2005)
- 21 September – Con Devitt, trade unionist (died 2014)
- 25 September – George Hoskins, athlete (died 2000)
- 30 September – Owen Dolan, Roman Catholic bishop (died 2025)

=== October ===
- 6 October – Rex Hamilton, sport shooter (died 2010)
- 9 October
  - Eris Paton, cricketer (died 2004)
  - Derek Steward, athlete (died 2017)
- 12 October – Jack Manning, architect (died 2021)
- 23 October – Bruce Kent, cyclist (died 1979)
- 24 October – Ken Hough, cricketer, association footballer (died 2009)
- 26 October – Ian Middleton, novelist (died 2007)

=== November ===
- 4 November – Ross Allen, politician, cricket umpire (died 2019)
- 8 November
  - Rex Forrester, hunter, fisherman (died 2001)
  - Susan Skerman, artist (died 2025)
- 11 November – Trevor Meale, cricketer (died 2010)
- 13 November – John Blumsky, journalist, broadcaster (died 2013)
- 23 November – Terry Dunleavy, wine industry leader, politician, columnist (died 2022)
- 26 November – David Garner, physical oceanographer (died 2016)
- 28 November – Percy Erceg, rugby union player, coach and administrator (died 2019)
- 30 November – Bryan Bartley, civil engineer, inventor (died 2015)

=== December ===
- 8 December – Maurice Cockerill, rugby union player, cricketer (died 2024)
- 9 December – Jim Kelly, cricketer (died 1995)
- 10 December – John Barry, tennis player
- 11 December
  - Norma Williams, swimmer, swimming administrator, journalist (died 2017)
  - Arnold Manaaki Wilson, artist, art educator (died 2012)
- 15 December – Friedensreich Hundertwasser, artist, architect (died 2000)
- 23 December – Jack Skeen, rugby union player (died 2001)
- 30 December – Jean Stonell, cricketer (died 2008)

== Deaths ==
=== January–March ===
- 23 January – Sir Westby Perceval, politician (born 1854)
- 12 February – Benjamin Harris, politician (born 1836)
- 16 February – Henry Travers, naturalist (born 1844)
- 18 February – William Calder, civil engineer (born 1860)
- 19 February – Charles Speight, brewer, businessman (born 1865)
- 3 March – Mark Cohen, journalist, educationalist, social reformer (born 1849)
- 5 March – Mary Alcorn, interior designer, businesswoman (born 1866)
- 21 March – William Robinson, cricketer (born 1863)

=== April–June ===
- 4 April – Norman Williams, cricketer (born 1864)
- 13 April – William Hardham, soldier, Victoria Cross recipient, rugby union player (born 1876)
- 20 April – John Callan, lawyer, politician (born 1844)
- 1 May – Ned Hughes, rugby union and rugby league player (born 1881)
- 6 May – Allan Thomson, geologist, scientific administrator, museum director (born 1881)
- 14 May – Falconer Larkworthy, banker, financier (born 1833)
- 7 June – John Edie, politician, surveyor, engineer (born 1856)
- 30 June – Mohi Te Ātahīkoia, Ngāti Kahungunu leader, politician, historian (born c.1842)

=== July–September ===
- 28 July – John Leith, cricketer (born 1857)
- 30 July – Norris Conradi, cricketer (born 1890)
- 2 August – Alexander Watt Williamson, schoolteacher, first graduate of the University of Otago (born 1849)
- 8 August – Frederick Earp, farmer, surveyor (born 1841)
- 15 August – Annie Rudman, social worker, Salvation Army officer (born 1844)
- 18 August – Alfred Mitchell, police superintendent (born 1853)
- 21 August – Rachel Reynolds, social worker, community leader (born 1838)
- 29 August – Sir William Sim, lawyer, jurist (born 1858)
- 2 September – Joseph Hatch, politician (born c.1837)

=== October–December ===
- 1 October – Hugo Friedlander, businessman, politician (born 1850)
- 6 October – John Bennett Tunbridge, police commissioner (born 1850)
- 12 October – John Mackintosh Roberts, soldier, magistrate (born 1840)
- 27 October – James Gardiner, politician (born 1861)
- 18 November – Harold Williams, journalist, polyglot (born 1876)
- 6 December – James Fulton, surveyor, civil engineer (born 1854)
- 13 December – Richard Teece, actuary, cricket administrator (born 1847)
- 27 December – Effie Richardson, landowner, litigant (born c.1849)

== See also ==
- List of years in New Zealand
- Timeline of New Zealand history
- History of New Zealand
- Military history of New Zealand
- Timeline of the New Zealand environment
- Timeline of New Zealand's links with Antarctica
