= ERP =

ERP or Erp may refer to:

== Economics ==
- Effective rate of protection, of tariffs
- Equity risk premium, excess return on risky investments
- European Recovery Program or Marshall Plan
- Enterprise resource planning, business software

== Science and technology ==
- Effective radiated power, of directional radio transmission
- Electronic Road Pricing, in Singapore

=== Medicine ===
- Effective refractory period, in a cardiac cycle
- Estrogen receptor positive, a cancer pathology test result
- Event-related potential, a measured brain response
- Exposure and response prevention, a treatment method in behavioral therapy
- OspE/F-like related protein, in Lyme disease microbiology

== Places ==
- Erp, Ariège, a village in France
- Erp (Germany), a village
- Erp, Netherlands, a town

== Other uses ==
- Erp (Pict), father of Drest I of the Picts
- Ejército Revolucionario del Pueblo (disambiguation), (Spanish for People's Revolutionary Army), several Latin American communist or socialist organizations
- Energy-related products (sometimes as ErP) that use or affect energy consumption
- Erotic role-playing, the use of role-playing in sexual or romantic contexts

== See also ==
- Van Erp, a Dutch surname
- D'Erp Castle, Baarlo, Limburg, Netherlands
- Ethernet Ring Protection Switching (ERPS), used in Ethernet networks
- Earp (disambiguation)
