= Erpe (disambiguation) =

Erpe may refer to:

- Erpe, a village in East Flanders, Belgium
- Erpe (Spree), a river in Brandenburg and Berlin, Germany
- Erpe (Twiste), a river in Hesse, Germany

== See also ==
- Erpe-Mere, a municipality in East Flanders, Belgium
- Thomas van Erpe (1584–1624), Dutch Orientalist
- Erp (disambiguation)
