= John Leith =

John Leith may refer to:

- John Farley Leith (1808–1887), Member of Parliament for Aberdeen
- John H. Leith (1919–2002), theologian
- John Leith (cricketer) (1857–1928), New Zealand cricketer
- Jack Leith (1872–1935), Australian rules footballer
