= Earp =

The name Earp may refer to:

== People ==
- Frederick Earp (1841–1928), New Zealand goldminer and farmer
- Members of American Earp family:
  - James Earp (1841–1926)
  - Virgil Earp (1843–1905)
  - Wyatt Earp (1848–1929)
  - Morgan Earp (1851–1882)
  - Warren Earp (1855–1900)
  - Newton Earp (1837– 1928)
- British Earps:
  - Thomas Earp (1828–1893), British Gothic Revival sculptor
  - Thomas Earp (politician) (1830–1910), British Liberal Party politician
  - John Earp (born 1860), English footballer
  - Clifford Earp (1879–1921), British racing motorist

== See also ==
- Mary Earps (born 1993), is an English footballer who plays in the, Women's Super League

== Culture ==
- Adaptations of Wyatt Earp's life:
  - The Life and Legend of Wyatt Earp, U.S. television series, 1955–1961
  - Wyatt Earp, 1994 film

== Places ==
- Earp, California, US
- Wyatt Earp Islands, off the coast of Antarctica
