= Edward Horton =

Ed, Eddie or Edward Horton may refer to:

- Edward Everett Horton (1886–1970), American character actor
- Eddie Horton (1893–after 1932), Australian organist at Sydney's Prince Edward Theatre
- Edward Austin Horton (1908–1980), Canadian politician, first mayor of Etobicoke, Ontario
- Edward Raymond Horton (1928–1977), New Zealand murderer
- Ed Horton (born 1967), American basketball power forward

== See also ==
- Edmund Horton (1896–1944), American Olympic bobsledder
