= LG Therma V =

LG Therma V is a line of air to water heat pump systems produced by LG Electronics for residential space heating, cooling and domestic hot water. The range includes monobloc and split configurations, with models using refrigerant R32 including and R290.

Therma V products have been introduced for new build and renovation projects in Europe. The range has expanded from split and monobloc systems to later models designed for higher water temperatures and operation in colder outdoor conditions.

== Development ==
In 2014, LG introduced a Therma V Monobloc range to complement its existing 9-16 kW split systems. The monobloc range covered capacities from 3 to 16 kW and was intended for low and medium temperature space heating and domestic hot water production in new build and refurbishment projects.

In 2019, LG introduced an R32 split version of Therma V for new housing and renovation projects. The model used LG's R1 compressor and included SmartThinQ controls for remote system monitoring and temperature adjustment.

LG launched the Therma V R32 monobloc S in the United Kingdom in 2021. Compared with the preceding model, it was lighter and required 16.7% less refrigerant. It also used the R1 compressor and could be fitted with a 3kW or 6kW electric backup heater.

In 2023, LG announced a propane based Therma V Monobloc for the European market. Later that year, the Therma V R290 Monobloc was reported in 9-16 kW sizes. The system could produce water at temperatures of up to 75°C, maintain its rated heating output at an ambient temperature of -15°C and operate at temperatures as low as -28°C. It received an ErP energy rating of up to A+++.

== Design and operation ==
An air to water heat pump transfers heat from outdoor air to water used in a building's heating system. The heated water can be circulated through raditators or underfloor heating and can also be used to produce domestic hot water. Therma V systems can also provide cooling in supported configurations.

Therma V is available in monobloc and split configurations. In a monobloc system, the main refrigeration and hydronic components are contained in the outdoor unit. The Therma V Monobloc S uses water piping between the outdoor unit and the building rather than refrigerant piping.

In a split system, the outdoor and indoor units are connected by refrigerant pipes, with hydronic components located in the indoor unit. LG's split range includes wall mounted and floor standing indoor units, including configurations with integrated water tanks.

The R32 Split and Monobloc S models use R32 refrigerant, while the later R290 Monobloc uses propane. Some models also support remote temperature adjustment and energy monitoring through the LG ThinQ application.

== Market adoption ==
In 2022, German heating company Thermondo began offering LG Therma V systems through a residential heat pump leasing programme. The pprogramme included the removal of existing heating equipment, installation of the heat pump, maintenance and remote fault diagnosis for a monthly payment. Thermondo identified LG Electronics as its launch partner and stated that it was targeting approximately 10,000 installations in 2023.

== Recognition and certification ==
The Therma V Monobloc S received Quiet Mark accreditation in 2023. The accredited range included 5,7,9 and 12 single phase models and 9 and 12 kW three phase models.

The Therma V R290 Monobloc appeared in the Industrial Designers Society of America's 2024 International Design Excellence Awards gallery. The listing described a 16 kW model with a horizontal wave front grille and a maximum water temperature of 75°C.

The Therma V Indoor Unit series was listed among the 2026 iF Design Award winners in the Product Design discipline and Building Technology category. The series included a 6.8 inch display for viewing heating an hot water information.
