= Alexander W. Williamson =

Alexander W. Williamson may refer to:

- Alexander William Williamson (1824–1904), chemist who discovered the Williamson ether synthesis reaction
- Alexander Watt Williamson (1849–1928), New Zealand schoolteacher
