= ERPs =

ERPs may refer to:

- ERPS, Ethernet Ring Protection Switching
- Erps-Kwerps, village in the Belgian Province of Flemish Brabant

== See also ==
- ERP (disambiguation)
