= Larry Savage =

Larry Savage may refer to:

- Larry Savage (rugby union) (1928–2013), New Zealand rugby union player
- Larry Savage (American football) (born 1957), American football player
