= Larkworthy =

Larkworthy is a surname. Notable people with the surname include:

- Falconer Larkworthy (1833–1928), New Zealand banker and financier
- Jane Larkworthy (1962–2025), American beauty editor and journalist
