= MIRAB =

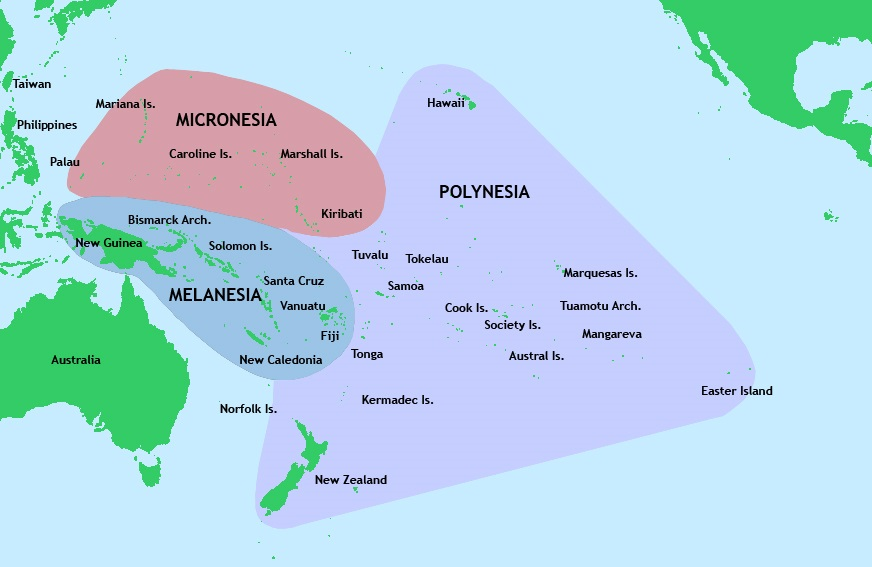
Map of the Pacific Islands. The MIRAB model represents the typical economic structure of the region.

MIRAB is a concept used to describe the economic structure and social conditions in the Pacific Islands. It is an acronym for Migration Remittances Aid and Bureaucracy. The term represents the general economic structure of Pacific nations, where they send labor migrants abroad and rely on their remittances and foreign economic aid as their primary sources of income. The bureaucracy functions as a conduit for the distribution of this economic aid.

== Concept ==
The term MIRAB was coined by economist Geoff Bertram and geographer Ray Watters, through their 1984 research project on New Zealand's policy towards the Pacific Islands. They argued that the economies of the Pacific Islands (Cook Islands, Niue, Tokelau, Kiribati, and Tuvalu) are based primarily on external capital, such as migrant remittances and development aid, making it difficult to apply a traditional economic approach to the region, which emphasizes export industries and private enterprise.

MIRAB is more prominent in Polynesia and Micronesia, and less applicable to Melanesia. This is due to the fact that Melanesia is relatively rich in population and natural resources compared to other regions in the Pacific. On the other hand, the structure of migration and remittances in the island-mainland relationship in Melanesia is similar to that between Polynesia and the overseas countries.

Bertram and his colleagues gave a positive assessment of the Pacific Islands' economy, which depends on aid and remittances. They criticized conventional economic theories and argued that the MIRAB economy was effective enough to realistically sustain local economies in microstates such as the Pacific Islands, where autonomous development is difficult. In this discussion, it was also noted that the Pacific Islands have established subsistence activities based on traditional community systems, and that the MIRAB economy, which does not involve domestic industrial development, has the merit of not destroying such a subsistence economic system. In conventional economic theory, such economic conditions were understood as unhealthy, implying "subordination" to other countries, but in the same discussion, "subordination" and "independence" in the Pacific countries were understood as cooperative rather than antagonistic. This perspective was not found in conventional economic development theory.

== Development of the theory ==
=== Application to non-Pacific Islands ===
Some researchers suggest that the MIRAB exists outside the Pacific Islands. Examples include Cape Verde, St. Helena, and São Tomé and Príncipe in the Atlantic; the U.S. Virgin Islands, St. Pierre and Miquelon, Guadeloupe, and Martinique in the Caribbean; and Comoros, Mayotte in the Indian Ocean. Some have also suggested that MIRAB could be applied to small landlocked countries such as Lesotho.

=== Criticisms and suggestions for alternative models ===
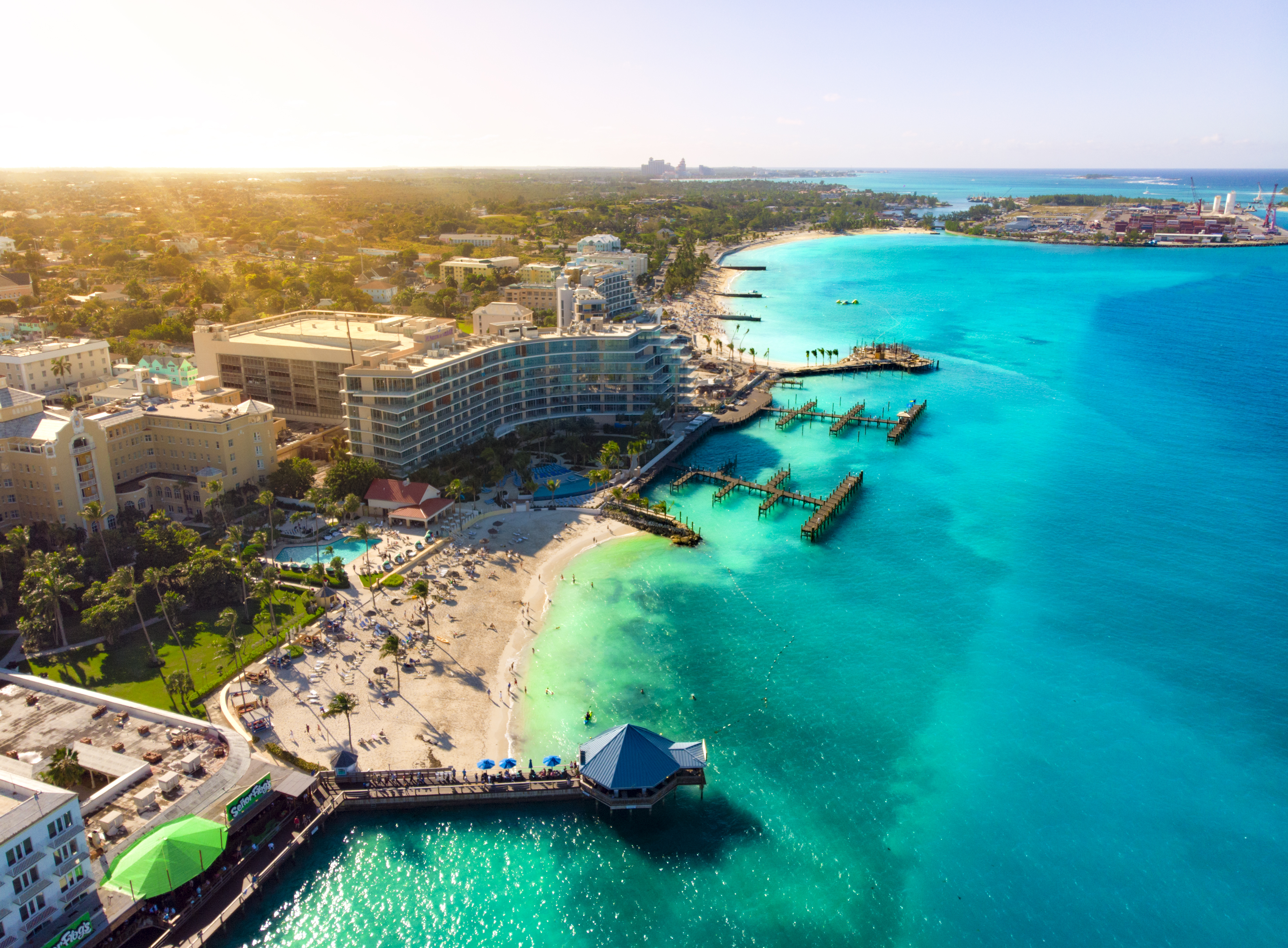
It is difficult to apply the MIRAB model to island states like the Bahamas, where the main industries are finance and tourism.

Although MIRAB has become a popular model in Pacific studies, these economic systems have not proven to be sustainable. Counterarguments to the positive assessment of MIRAB include that the negative impact of aid on village economies has not been properly assessed, that MIRAB model ignores the development potential of agricultural economies, and that the ethnographic evidence is incomplete. Jon Fraenkel argues that while the MIRAB model is useful for describing some island economies, it is inadequate for discussing future economic development and is not clear enough to be used for policy recommendations.

From the perspective that the MIRAB model cannot fully explain the economic structure of all island states, alternative and complementary models have also been developed. For example, in 2006, Jerome L. McElroy coined a term SITEs (small island tourist economies) to describe island economies that rely heavily on inbound tourism. In the same year, Godfrey Baldacchino proposed the "PROFIT" model. This is an acronym for people considerations, resource management, overseas engagement, finance, insurance and taxation, and transportation. The model is useful in describing islands that have offshore banks, tax havens, flag of convenience and military bases as their economic base. However, some are wary of the use of these acronyms. Eric Clark argues that such categorization simplifies the political context of each region.
