= Our Lady of Victories Church, Christchurch =

Church in Christchurch, New Zealand

Our Lady of Victories Church
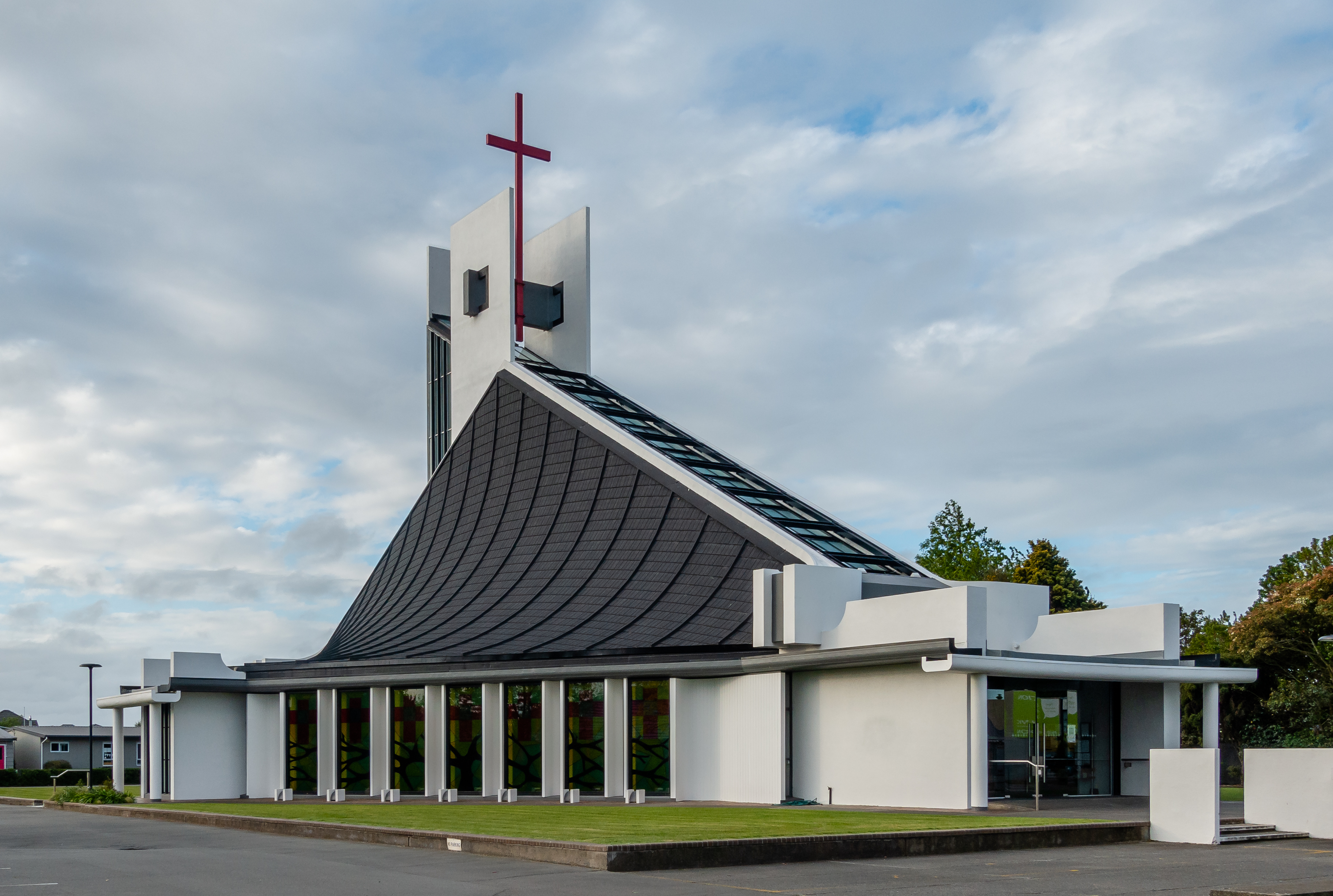
- Our Lady of Victories in 2020
- Interactive map of the Our Lady of Victories Church area

General information
- Location: Sockburn, Christchurch, New Zealand
- Coordinates: 43°32′09″S 172°33′34″E
- Year built: 1967
- Opened: 10 March 1968
- Renovated: 2019
- Cost: £NZ56,000

Design and construction
- Architect: Charles Thomas
- Engineer: E.G.S. Powell
- Awards: Canterbury Design Award (1968); National Award for Excellence of Design (1970); Enduring Architecture Award (2004); National Enduring Architecture Award (2005)

Our Lady of Victories Church is a church building in Christchurch, New Zealand, in the suburb of Sockburn. It was designed by Charles Thomas for the Our Lady of Victories Parish. The building has won several awards for its architectural design and engineering, and is a significant building in Thomas' legacy. It is the only church designed by Thomas that was built.

Thomas designed the building in 1964, encouraged by Bishop Brian Ashby to freely pursue his vision for what the building ought to be, scrapping an earlier design that was more traditional. Thomas used religious symbolism in his design and was inspired to develop the layout in response to emerging changes in the liturgy then endorsed by Vatican II. The building broke conventional church design by rejecting rectangular form in favour of a diamond shape, with a prominent hyperbolic paraboloid roof.

Ashby played an important role; he enabled Thomas to conceive the building and the internal layout using a modern design language that embodied the spirit of Vatican II, and helped the project to secure more funding so that it could be realised despite initial budget constraints.

The original layout and interior design has changed over the years since it was first built, however Thomas did act as a consultant in 2019 during a substantial restoration of the roof. In the present day, the building continues to operate as a church and is also used by Our Lady of Victories School.

== Construction and design ==
In 1964, Our Lady of Victories Catholic Church was looking to build a new church to house a congregation of approximately 400 and at a cost of £NZ36,000. Thomas was approached by Leo Steel, member of the parish who was on the building committee, and agreed to design the project.

Thomas originally designed a rectangular, utilitarian space due to the budget constraint and the required size. The plan was accepted by the parish committee. Thomas presented a model of the design to Bishop Brian Ashby, who asked Thomas what he would do if he could design the building freely. Thomas sketched a vision of the new design; Ashby instructed Thomas to continue with his new concept and abandon the rectangular proposal. In his new design, Thomas pursued a communal concept so that each member felt they were being spoken to directly when in attendance. This idea influenced the diamond shape of the structure, breaking the traditional rectangular form.

The building was constructed in 1967 at a cost of £NZ56,000, with the overspend covered by diocesan funds. It was blessed and opened by Ashby on 10 March 1968.

=== Religious symbolism ===
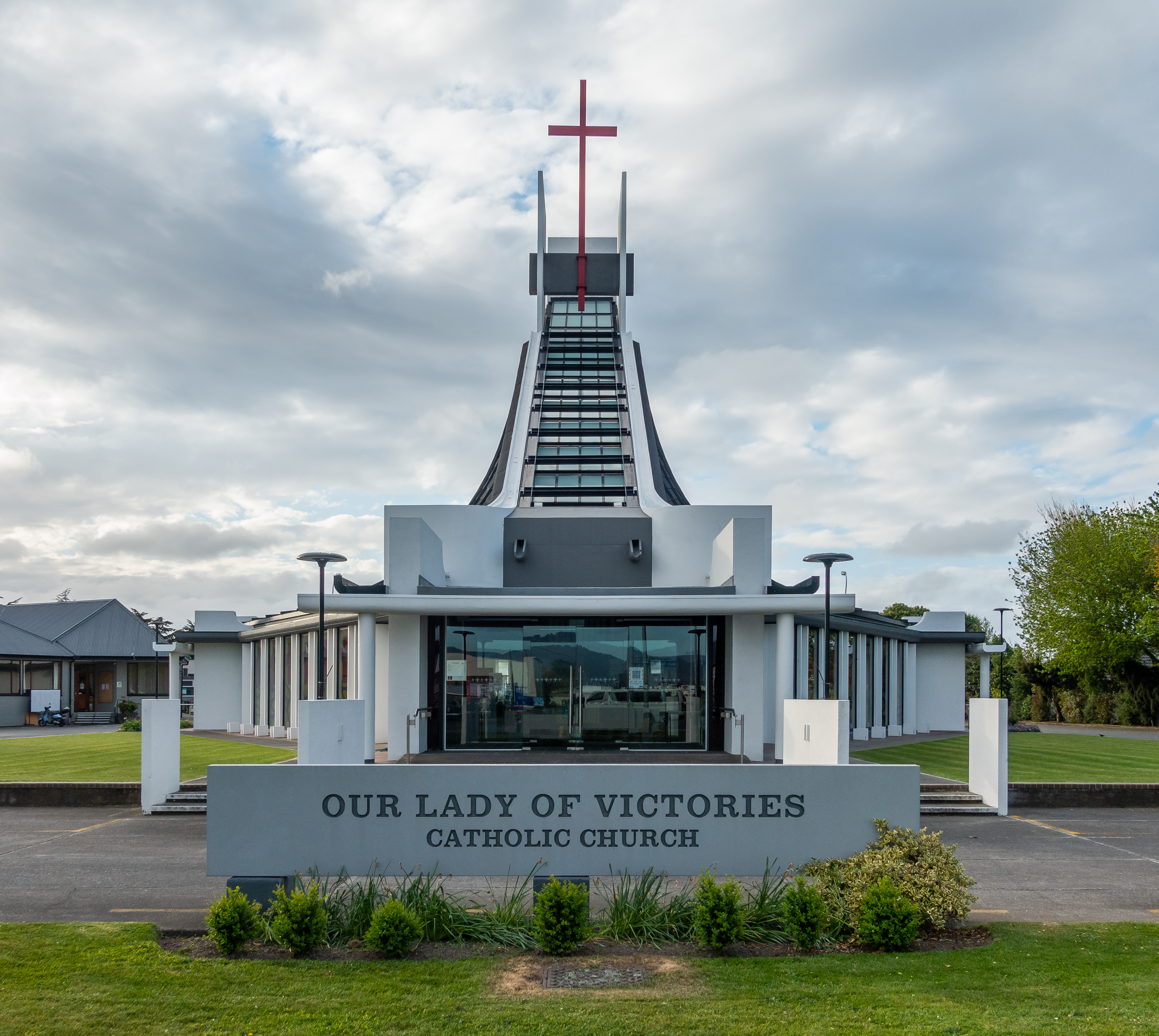
Front view, with the skylight representing a staircase to the cross

The design of the building directly draws from religious symbolism. The sweeping, curved roof represents the hands of God open to the community, with light flowing in from the skylights. The four supporting structural walls represent the evangelists Matthew, Mark, Luke and John. The separation in the roof enables light to enter the building, with the skylights leading up to the cross like a staircase, contained in a spire of three walls representing the Holy Trinity.

At the time of its design, there were changes made in the liturgy endorsed by Vatican II. Thomas was himself a liberal catholic, and developed the design to reflect this vision and embrace communal participation. The baptistry was placed at the entrance to the church in line with the altar, to symbolise the journey of becoming a member of the church, a layout which was unusual at the time.

Most of Thomas' design choices went unchallenged or were sanctioned by Ashby, with the exception of placing the sacristy at the entrance. Ashby rejected this idea, although examples of this layout have appeared in Catholic churches built subsequently.

== Renovations ==
Some aspects of the interior layout and design of Our Lady of Victories Church have been removed or added since the building was originally designed, at the will of more traditional parish priests. These choices were not made by Thomas and in some cases disrupt the philosophy behind the original design. Examples during its history included the return of plaster statues, and the font and glass partition being removed from the entrance, disrupting the line of sight from the outside of the building to the altar which Thomas had intentionally designed to represent the connection between the congregation and community.

In 2019, a large project was undertaken to restore the roof, replacing the materials and removing asbestos. Additional work was done to improve its water-tightness. The project took care to respect the original appearance of the building, with Thomas himself acting as consultant.

== Awards and legacy ==
The building has won several awards from the New Zealand Institute of Architects (NZIA). In 1968, it received the NZIA Canterbury branch design award, then in 1970, the national award for excellence of design. In 2004, it won the local NZIA enduring architecture award, followed by the 2005 NZIA national enduring architecture award.

On 1 October 1970, the building was commemorated as one of three stamps in the annual Christmas collection by New Zealand Post.

== See also ==
- Charles Thomas
- Brian Ashby
- Roman Catholic Diocese of Christchurch
- Christchurch Style architecture
