= Henrica van Erp =

Dutch abbess and historian

- Born: c. 1480; De Bilt, Netherlands
- Died: 26 December 1548; Utrecht, Netherlands
- Burial place: Oostbroek Women's Monastery
- Occupations: Abbess, author
- Known for: The Chronicle
- Parents: Johan van Erp (father); Hildegunda Heins of Heijm (mother)

Henrica van Erp (c. 1480 – 26 December 1548), was a Dutch abbess and author of her monastery's Chronicle, making her one of the first historians of 16th-century Netherlands.

== Biography ==
Henrica van Erp was the daughter of Johan van Erp (knight) and Hildegunda Heins of Heijm. She had a sister Jacoba van Erp, who became abbess of the Cistercian monastery Het Munster in Roermond from 1520 to 1558 or 1559. Her brother Jan van Erp was a "high back" (in Dutch: hoogschout) of 's-Hertogenbosch between 1505 and 1521.

Henrica's parents probably placed her in the Benedictine Monastery of Oostbroek (also called the Oostbroek Women's Monastery) in De Bilt when she was a child. About 15 to 20 nuns would have been living there at the time. Oostbroek was one of five monasteries for noble women known to have been established in and around the city of Utrecht at the time.

On 15 September 1503 she was elected monastery abbess as confirmed in a deed. She continued to lead her congregation for more than 45 years and was responsible for managing the community's property holdings and resources, as noted in the chronicle. According to Huygens ING: "Many procedural documents and accounts have been preserved, especially regarding the exploitation of peat soils between De Bilt and Soest." At that time peat was the country's primary fuel source and a source of income.

After her death in Utrecht on 26 December 1548, van Erp was buried in the abbey church. When the Protestant Reformation reached the Netherlands, many Catholic monasteries, including hers, were demolished. Among the ruins of the monastery, destroyed in 1580 or 1585, her tombstone was discovered in 1612.

Two family coats of arms were also placed in the tombstone, the left one with a blocked Andrew's cross, the judge with a six-pointed star. In the left arm we recognize the coat of arms of the noble genus Van Erp, described in the Dutch Nobility Book as follows: "In black, one of silver and red checkered St. Andrew's Cross (nine silver and eight red areas)'. It we have not been able to identify the right arm, but it undoubtedly comes from her family on the mother's side, the Heins family.

== Author ==
Abbess van Erp's chronicle was handwritten and the original is now lost, however, the document was copied at the end of the 17th century by amateur historian Andries Schoemaker (1660 – 1735) from Amsterdam. Schoemaker's copy dates from around 1700 and was published in 1698 by Antonius Matthaeus and is currently held in the library collection of Utrecht University. Because of her chronicle, the abbess is considered to have been "the first historian of our local history."

The chronicle contains notes about events that took place in and around the monastery, and was probably written largely by the abbess herself. Van Erp is mentioned in the chronicle, but it appears those notes were added by others during the years of her leadership. According to Huygens ING:

The chronicle (58 pages) starts with the founding year of the Women's Monastery: 'in the year 1139, when the women's monastery was timbered, and the ladies were put here in the monastery', according to her - rewritten - opening sentence. She tells of the restoration of the monastery tower in 1518 and maintenance of the buildings, of the dressing of new ones and the death of old monks, and of the natural disasters and wars that the monastery experienced in its years. She pays ample attention to the plundering of the Gelderland superior, Maarten van Rossum. She also describes the visit of Emperor Charles V to Utrecht.

After van Erp's death, her chronicle was continued by others describing the period 1549 to 1583, and the work of three succeeding abbesses, Johanna van Hardenbroek (1549 – 1570), Maria van Zuylen (1570 – 1579) and Catharina van Oostrum (1580 – c. 1589).

Van Erp's chronicle was republished in 2010 based on Schoemaker's handwriting and included a translation into modern Dutch, along with commentary by Anne Doedens and Henk van Looijestein. The version was a collaborative project between the Utrecht Archives and Utrecht University Library. This edition of the chronicle is in the Utrecht Archives.

A digital edition of van Erp's work is available on the Utrecht Chronicles website.

== External sources ==
- De kroniek van Henrica van Erp (The Chronicles of Henrica van Erp): http://dspace.library.uu.nl/handle/1874/211852
- Louise van Tongerloo, Women's Monastery: Glasses Received and Memories Granted, Oud-Utrecht Monthly 57 (1984) 37-46, 53-56.
- AJM van Pol, Henrica van Erp (ca 1480-1548) abbess and writer, Utrecht Biographies 3 (Utrecht 1996) 45-49 [with literature and archives].
- Doedens, Anne, About the oldest document: Bilts beginning in 1113, in: De Biltse Grift 17 (2008), 34-49
