= Arthur Young House =

Former office building in Christchurch, New Zealand

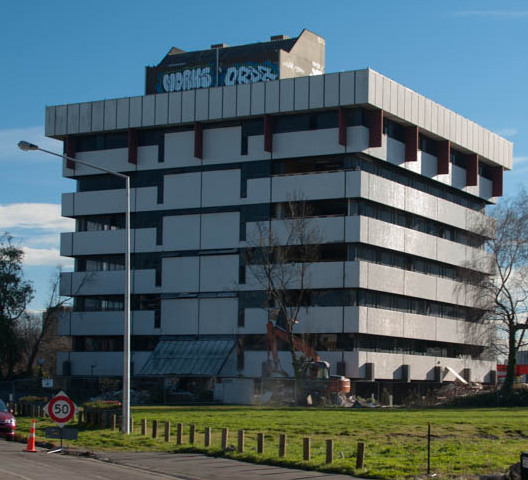
- The building in June 2014, prior to demolition
- Interactive map of the Arthur Young House area
- Alternative names: Ernst & Young building

General information
- Type: Commercial
- Architectural style: Christchurch Style
- Location: 227 Cambridge Terrace, Christchurch Central City, Christchurch
- Coordinates: 43.5274°S 172.6382°E
- Year built: 1984–1985
- Opened: 5 July 1985
- Demolished: July 2014
- Cost: NZ$2M (approximately)
- Owner: Methodist Church of New Zealand

Technical details
- Floor count: 7

Design and construction
- Architect: Charles Thomas
- Architecture firm: Charles R. Thomas & Associates
- Structural engineer: Tyndall and Hanham
- Main contractor: Don Forbes Construction

Arthur Young House (later known as the Ernst & Young building) was an office building in central Christchurch, New Zealand. It was designed for the New Zealand Methodist Trust Association by architect Charles Thomas, in the brutalist Christchurch style.

Arthur Young House was constructed in the mid-1980s on Cambridge Terrace, on the site of the former Methodist Church, which had burned down in an arson attack in 1982. The New Zealand Methodist Trust rented out much of the building to private firms.

In February 2011, the building was damaged in the Christchurch earthquakes and subsequently demolished.

== Construction and design ==
Arthur Young House was built during 1984 and 1985 for the Methodist Church of New Zealand. The site had been owned by the Christchurch Methodist Central Mission, and was mainly occupied by Cambridge Terrace Church. It was destroyed in 1982 following an arson attack. The New Zealand Methodist Trust Association chose to build the office block on the site, intending for the rental profits to be used on community projects.

The building was architecturally designed by Charles Thomas through his firm, Charles R. Thomas & Associates. Structural engineering work was undertaken by Tyndall and Hanham, and it was built by Don Forbes Construction. The total cost was estimated to be approximately NZ$2M.

The building was seven storeys, comprising six floors of office space; five of the floors were 650 m^{2} (7,000 ft^{2}) each, and the top floor was 740 m^{2} (8,000 ft^{2}). The exterior used white glass-reinforced concrete panels, a relatively novel approach at the time, with tinted glass windows and bronze aluminium, and balconies that wrapped around the building. The ground floor had 20 covered car parks and 16 additional parking spaces on site, with landscaped grounds to complement the riverside location. The interior entrance had walls and floor clad in Italian and Tākaka marble, respectively.

A poll published in 1987 by The Press found that Christchurch residents generally liked the design of the building, in contrast to some other projects in the city during the high-rise boom.

== History ==
The building was formally opened on 5 July 1985 by the mayor of Christchurch, Sir Hamish Hay, in a ceremony attended by a number of businesspeople.

The Methodist Church leased much of the office space to other firms, particularly financial companies. It was named Arthur Young House after one of its primary tenants, Arthur Young, an chartered accountants firm that originally operated on the sixth floor. The first floor was also used for seminars and public events.

From 2006 until its demolition, Arthur Young House was owned by a family trust, including Hilton Smith. In its later years, the building was colloquially known as Ernst & Young House; this is not to be confused with a building of the same name on Kilmore Street, which was also demolished.

Arthur Young House was located next to the PGC Building, which collapsed in the 2011 Christchurch earthquake. Several people who worked in Arthur Young House received bravery awards after helping those at the collapsed building.

== Demolition ==
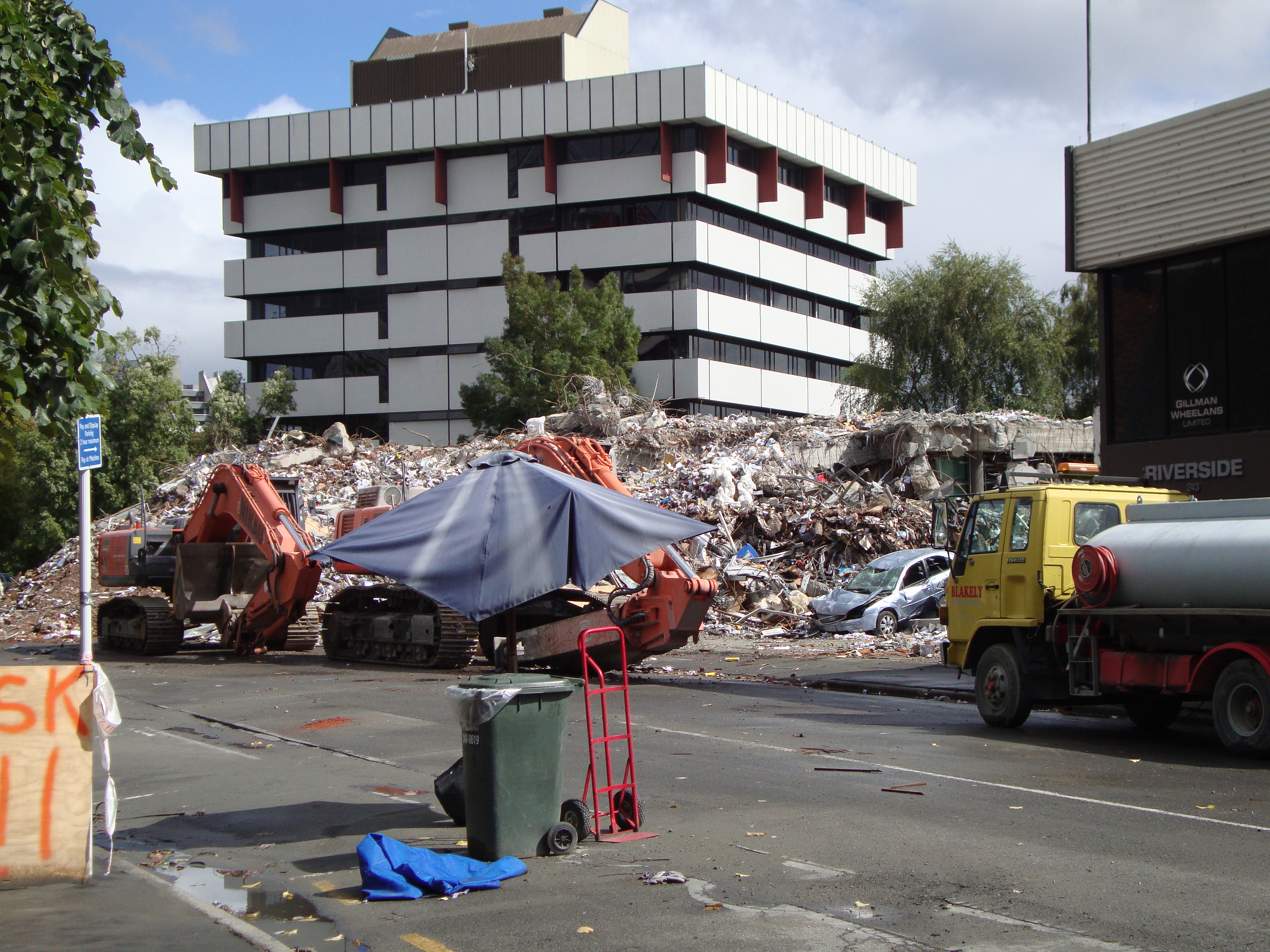
Arthur Young House in March 2011, with the collapsed PGC building adjacent

Arthur Young House was damaged in the 2011 Christchurch earthquake. The property was estimated to cost NZ$11M to repair, plus re-levelling at a further cost of NZ$2.7M. The owners allegedly made a mistake in their insurance policy renewal, filed in November 2010 following the Canterbury earthquake in September, by failing to include an "undamaged foundations" extension, causing a dispute with the insurer.

The building was considered uneconomic to repair, but also was subject to compulsory acquisition as part of a plan to redevelop the inner-city to a master plan dubbed "The Frame". Consequently, Arthur Young House was demolished throughout June and July 2014. The demolition project was undertaken by Shilton & Brown.
