= Peter Yaxley =

New Zealand rugby league player and referee (1928–2015)

Personal information
- Full name: Larry George Yaxley
- Born: 12 July 1928; New Zealand
- Died: 3 March 2015 (aged 86); Christchurch, New Zealand

Playing information
- Position: Stand-off
Club
Years	Team	Pld	T	G	FG	P
	Sydenham
Representative
Years	Team	Pld	T	G	FG	P
	Canterbury

Refereeing information
Years	Competition	Apps
	Canterbury Rugby League
1974	International	1

Larry George "Peter" Yaxley (12 July 1928 – 3 March 2015) was a New Zealand rugby league player and referee. He played at stand off.

== Playing career ==
Yaxley played for Sydenham in the Canterbury Rugby League competition. He was part of the side that won four consecutive titles between 1953 and 1956 and two Thacker Shields in 1955 and 1956. Yaxley also represented Canterbury, including in an 18-all draw with Auckland in 1955.

== Referee career ==
After retirement, Yaxley refereed in the Canterbury Rugby League competition, including in the first nine grand finals between 1967 and 1975.

Yaxley refereed the second test match between the New Zealand national rugby league team and Great Britain in 1974. He also controlled tour matches involving Australia, South Africa and France.

== Later years ==
Yaxley served as Sydenham's club president and was made a life member. He served on the Canterbury Rugby League's board of control and served on the New Zealand Rugby League's Schoolboy Council for 12 years as the Otago delegate. He became a life member of the Canterbury Rugby Football League in 1981.

Yaxley died at Christchurch on 3 March 2015.
