= Douglas St. John =

New Zealand cricketer

Personal information
- Full name: Douglas Stuart St. John
- Born: 26 February 1928; Nelson, New Zealand
- Died: 11 July 1992 (aged 64); Ōtāne, Hawke's Bay, New Zealand
- Batting: Right-handed
- Role: Batsman

Domestic team information
- Years: Team
- 1946/47–1950/51: Otago
- 1952/53–1955/56: Wellington
- FC debut: 1 January 1947 Otago v Auckland
- Last FC: 10 February 1956 Wellington v West Indies

Career statistics
Competition	First-class
Matches	34
Runs scored	1,236
Batting average	20.94
100s/50s	0/5
Top score	88
Balls bowled	84
Wickets	0
Bowling average	–
5 wickets in innings	–
10 wickets in match	–
Best bowling	–
Catches/stumpings	21/–
- Source: CricketArchive, 15 September 2009

Douglas Stuart St John (26 February 1928 – 11 July 1992) was a New Zealand sportsman who played field hockey for the New Zealand national team and first class cricket for Otago and Wellington between the 1946–47 and 1956–57 seasons. A right-handed batsman, St. John played 34 first-class matches, scoring 1,236 runs at 20.94 with five half-centuries.

== Career ==
Doug St John was born at Nelson in 1928 and attended Otago Boys' High School, where he won the award for most improved player in the cricket team in his second-last year, 1944. He went on to study commerce at the University of New Zealand.

St. John made his debut on 1 January 1947, against Auckland. Batting at six for Otago, he scored 28 and 31, and took two catches but could not stave off a one wicket defeat. He went on to play two more matches that season; scoring eight and eight not out against Wellington on 31 January, six and 25 in a drawn game against the Marylebone Cricket Club on 25 March. He ended his first season with 106 runs from three matches at 21.20, with a best of 31.

At the start of the next season, St. John scored 85 and five not out against Wellington on Christmas Day. He would go on to play five matches in total, scoring a career-best 278 runs at 34.75, with two half centuries. He was selected to play for South Island in the match against North Island at the end of the season, scoring 47 and 63. His batting and sharp fielding in the match were noted, and he was named alongside John Reid as a promising player who might be selected to tour England in 1949.

He struggled with the bat during the next few seasons, scoring only 102 runs during 1948/49 at 20.40 with a best of 53, and 117 during 1950/51 at 16.71, followed by 92 runs at 13.13 and 146 runs at 18.25 during his first two seasons at Wellington. He improved, however, during the 1954/55 season, where he scored 213 runs at 21.30, including a career-best 88 in 116 minutes against Central Districts on 7 January 1955. Opening the batting – as he often did after moving to Wellington – St. John's 88 was bettered only by Test cricketer John Reid's 106 as Wellington pursued Central Districts' first innings score of 183 all out. St. John made 15 more runs in the second innings as Wellington reached victory by four wickets.

The following season was to be his last, however, and saw St. John play five matches, scoring 182 runs at 20.22 with a best of 52 – his only half century of the season, which came in his final match. He bowed out on 10 February 1956, against a touring West Indies team that included Garfield Sobers. St. John scored his 52 in the first innings before being caught by Sobers, and made 19 as Wellington were forced to follow on and fell to an innings defeat.

St. John worked as a solicitor. He died at Ōtāne in Hawke's Bay in 1992 at the age of 64. An obituary was published in the 1996 edition of the New Zealand Cricket Almanack.
