= Johnny Dodd (rugby league) =

New Zealand international rugby league footballer

Personal information
- Full name: John Fraser Dodd
- Born: 16 March 1928
- Died: 25 October 2007 (aged 79)

Playing information
- Position: Stand-off
Club
Years	Team	Pld	T	G	FG	P
	St.George (WRL)
Representative
Years	Team	Pld	T	G	FG	P
≤1951–≥52	Wellington
1951–52	New Zealand	0	0	0	0	0
1952	North Island

John Fraser Dodd (16 March 1928 – 25 October 2007) was a New Zealand professional rugby league footballer who played in the 1950s. He played at representative level for New Zealand, and Wellington, as a stand-off.

== Playing career ==
Dodd played for the St. George club in the Wellington Rugby League competition and represented Wellington. After a brilliant trial match in 1951 Dodd was selected for the New Zealand national rugby league team tour of Great Britain and France. Due to injuries Dodd didn't play a test on tour, however he did score four tries in nine tour games.

Dodd played for the North Island in 1952. He was part of St. George's premierships in 1953, 1955, 1957 and 1958.
