= Charles Thomas (architect) =

New Zealand architect (1928–2022)

- Born: Charles Ramon Thomas; 23 July 1928; Christchurch, New Zealand
- Died: 26 April 2022 (aged 93); Christchurch, New Zealand
- Occupation: Architect
- Practice: Charles Thomas & Associates
- Website: charlesthomasassociates.co.nz (archived)

Charles Ramon Thomas (23 July 1928 – 26 April 2022) was a New Zealand architect. He belonged to a movement of post-war architects in Christchurch who helped shape the Christchurch Style of architecture. Over a career spanning six decades, Thomas designed numerous residential, commercial and public buildings in Christchurch.

Among Thomas' notable works include Our Lady of Victories Church (1967) and the School of Music building (1974) at the University of Canterbury, both of which have won NZIA enduring architecture awards in 2004 and 2018, respectively. Thomas also designed high-rise buildings during the 1980s boom in Christchurch, including Arthur Young House (1985) and the headquarters of Don Forbes Construction (1983).

Thomas spent most of his life in Christchurch, where he was born. He took an interest in architecture while attending Christchurch Boys' High School, and briefly lived in Auckland to study the discipline at Auckland University College. Soon after graduating, he returned to Christchurch and worked for various architectural practices, before starting his own in the early 1960s.

== Biography ==
Charles Ramon Thomas was born in Christchurch on 23 July 1928, the son of Maud Victoria and Johnston Vivian Thomas. He grew up in the suburb of Sydenham. He was educated at Christchurch Boys' High School, where one of his teachers saw his potential and encouraged him to pursue architecture.

Following World War II, Thomas attended Auckland University College. After graduating, he returned to Christchurch where he worked for Griffiths Architects, and later, Hall & Mackenzie Architects. He started his own practice, Charles Thomas & Associates, in 1962.

Thomas believed in designing buildings that respected the surrounding environment, with form following function. He was inspired by Le Corbusier, Frank Lloyd Wright, and Ludwig Mies van der Rohe.

Thomas died aged 93 at Anthony Wilding Retirement Village in Aidanfield, Christchurch, on 26 April 2022. A private family service was held at Thomas' request.

== Career ==
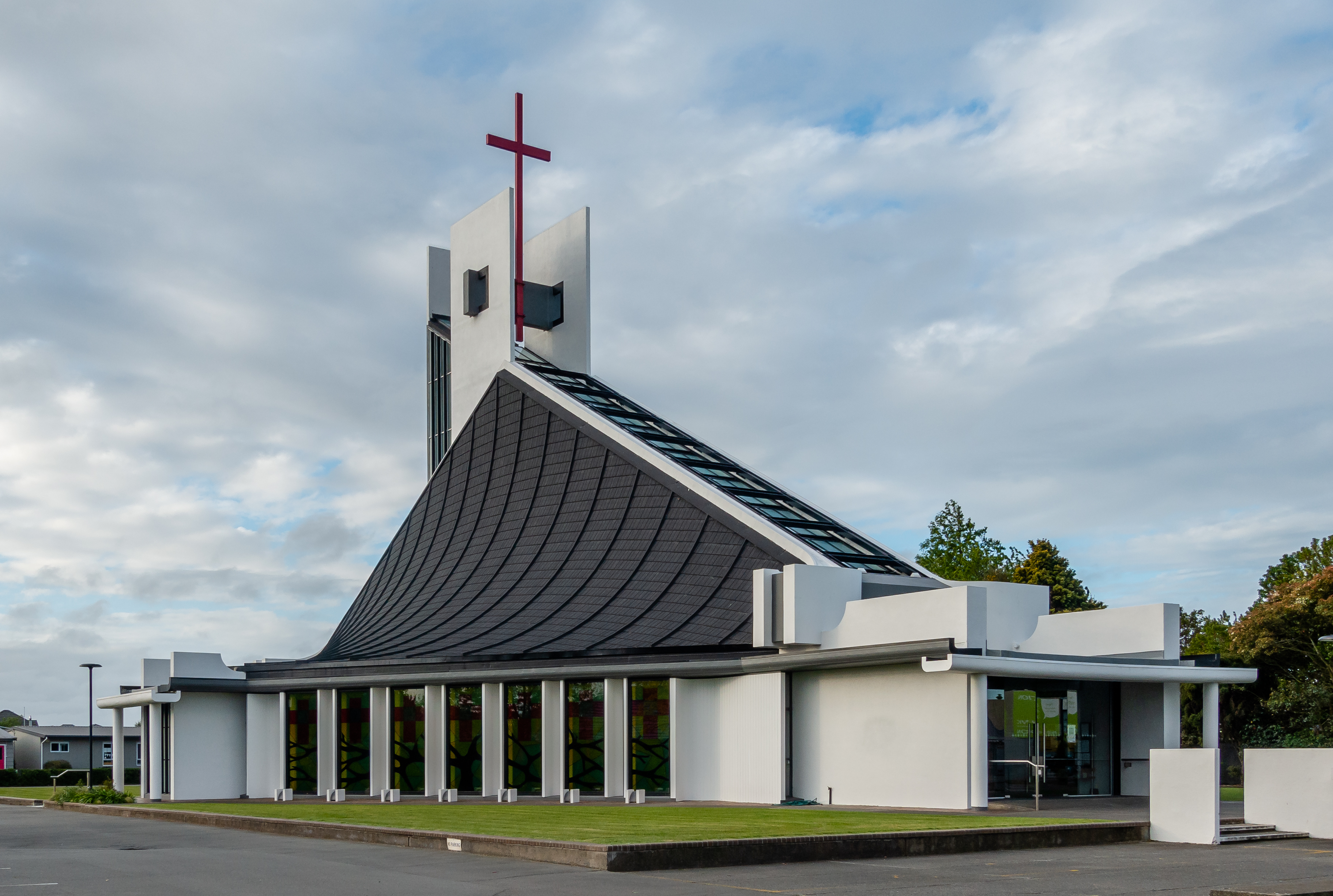
Our Lady of Victories Church (1967) in 2020, considered to be one of Thomas' greatest works

Thomas' architectural career spanned over six decades. He worked for Griffiths Architects and Hall & Mackenzie before starting his own practice in 1962. His work included buildings, landscaping and interior design projects.

Thomas was part of the Christchurch School movement which formed a local architectural vernacular based on modernism, known as Christchurch Style. Examples of this in his work include Boyd House (1970) in Spreydon, and the University of Canterbury; Thomas designed both the School of Music (1974) which won the 2018 Enduring Architecture award from the New Zealand Institute of Architects, and worked on the Rochester and Rutherford halls of residence. In 1985, he designed Arthur Young House for the Methodist Church in Christchurch.

In the 1960s, Thomas designed the Our Lady of Victories Church in Sockburn, which won several awards from the New Zealand Institute of Architects.

== Personal life ==
Thomas spent most of his life in Christchurch. He met his partner, Anne, at university. They had nine children together. At the time of his death, Thomas had twenty-seven grandchildren and fourteen great-grandchildren. Two of Thomas' children, Simon and Nicholas, took over his architectural practice; it is now known as Thomas & Associates.

Thomas lived at 9 Cranmer Square in an apartment he designed, which was once featured in a piece by The Press in 1999. He left the property in 2011 after it was badly damaged in the Christchurch earthquakes and demolished.

In addition to architecture, Thomas was described as an artist and orator, and was a member of a local debating team. He was described as a "practising, liberal Catholic" in the 1960s.
