= Jack Skeen =

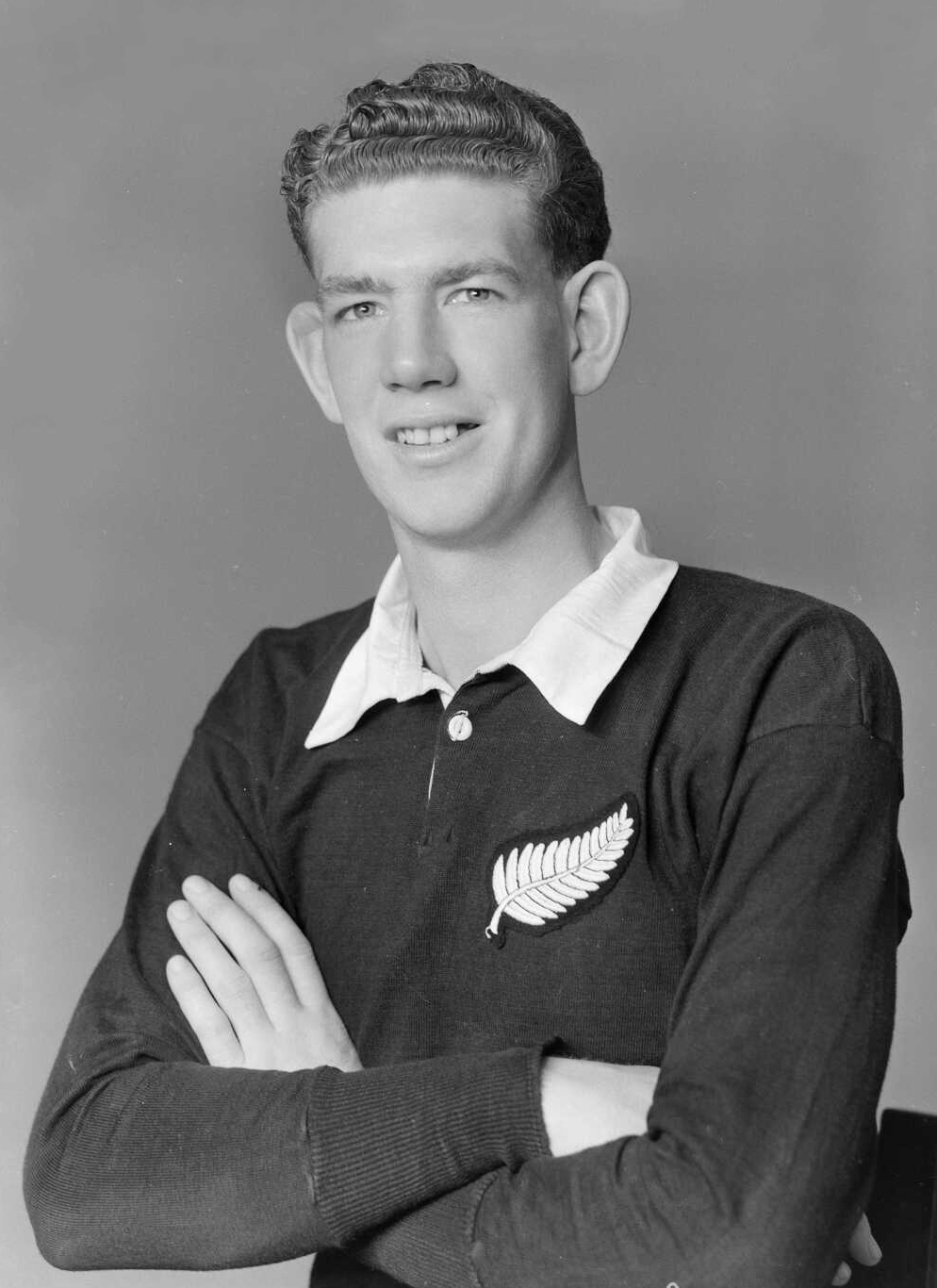
- Skeen in 1953
- Born: Jack Robert Skeen; 23 December 1928 Auckland, New Zealand
- Died: 28 September 2001 (aged 72) Auckland, New Zealand
- Height: 1.90 m (6 ft 3 in)
- Weight: 86 kg (190 lb)
- School: Sacred Heart College

Rugby union career
- Position: Flanker
Provincial / State sides
Years	Team	Apps	(Points)
1951–57	Auckland	89	
International career
Years	Team	Apps	(Points)
1952	New Zealand	1	(0)

Jack Robert Skeen (23 December 1928 – 28 September 2001) was a New Zealand rugby union player. A flanker, Skeen represented Auckland at a provincial level, captaining the side from 1954 to 1957. He played just one match the New Zealand national side, the All Blacks, a test against the touring Australian team at Wellington in 1952.
