= Alfred James Mitchell =

New Zealand police superintendent

Alfred James Mitchell (19 January 1853 – 18 August 1928) was a New Zealand police superintendent. He was born in Plymouth, Devonshire, England on 19 January 1853.
