= James Gill (New Zealand cricketer) =

New Zealand cricketer (1928–2019)

Personal information
- Full name: James Allan Gill
- Born: 11 April 1928; Invercargill, New Zealand
- Died: 30 June 2019 (aged 91); Invercargill, New Zealand
- Batting: Left-handed
- Role: Wicket-keeper

Domestic team information
- Years: Team
- 1953/54–1963/64: Otago

Career statistics
Competition	First-class
Matches	16
Runs scored	458
Batting average	16.96
100s/50s	0/2
Top score	91
Catches/stumpings	18/5
- Source: Cricinfo, 6 February 2018

James Allan Gill (11 April 1928 – 30 June 2019) was a New Zealand cricketer. He played 16 first-class matches for Otago between 1953 and 1964.

Jim Gill was a wicket-keeper and a useful batsman. He made his highest score of 91 as an opening batsman against Canterbury on Christmas Day 1954. He also played for Southland from the late 1940s to the mid-1960s and was a life member and patron of the Southland Cricket Association. He died on 30 June 2019 in Invercargill.

Gill was born at Invercargill in Southland in 1928. In later life he was a selector for the Otago side.
