= John Earp =

English footballer

Personal information
- Date of birth: Q1 1860
- Place of birth: Newport, Shropshire, England
- Position: Forward

Senior career*
Years	Team	Apps	(Gls)
1884–1887	Newton Heath LYR	0	(0)
- * Club domestic league appearances and goals

John Earp (born Q1 1860) was an English footballer who played as a forward. Born in Newport, Shropshire, he played for Newton Heath (now Manchester United) between 1885 and 1888. As well as an appearance in an FA Cup match against Fleetwood Rangers in October 1886, he also played in 10 Manchester Senior Cup matches, scoring one goal. He played as an outside right against Fleetwood Rangers, but he could equally play as an inside forward, centre-forward or as a wing half.
