= Norris Conradi =

New Zealand cricketer

Personal information
- Born: 25 August 1890; Melbourne, Australia
- Died: 30 July 1928 (aged 37); Dunedin, New Zealand

Domestic team information
- Years: Team
- 1917/18–1925/26: Otago

Career statistics
Competition	First-class
Matches	10
Runs scored	233
Batting average	12.94
100s/50s	0/0
Top score	39
Balls bowled	466
Wickets	6
Bowling average	38.50
5 wickets in innings	0
10 wickets in match	0
Best bowling	2/21
Catches/stumpings	5/–
- Source: Cricinfo, 2 September 2023

Norris Conradi (25 August 1890 – 30 July 1928) was a New Zealand cricketer. He played ten first-class matches for Otago between the 1917–18 and 1925–26 seasons, including one against the touring MCC team in 1922–23. He was a prominent player in senior club cricket in Dunedin, but was unable to reproduce his club form in first-class matches for Otago, where he scored a total of 233 runs and took six wickets. His highest score for Otago was 39, scored in 38 minutes, against MCC in January 1923.

Conradi was born at Melbourne in Australia in 1890. He worked as a commercial traveller in Dunedin. His first wife died in May 1913, aged 23. He died of a heart attack in Dunedin in July 1928, aged 37, survived by his second wife and his son from his first marriage.
