= Con Devitt =

Scottish-born New Zealand trade unionist

- Born: Cornelius Devitt; 21 September 1928; Greenock, Renfrewshire, Scotland
- Died: 13 July 2014 (aged 85); Wellington, New Zealand
- Occupation: Trade union leader
- Spouse: Joyce Bastow

Cornelius "Con" Devitt (21 September 1928 – 13 July 2014) was a Scottish-born New Zealand trade unionist.

== Early life and family ==
Born in Greenock in 1928 to Annie (née Muldoon) and Cornelius Devitt, he grew up in Clydebank. He began working as a plater at a local shipyard and soon became involved in defending workers' rights. After World War II, Devitt served in Egypt with the 1st Battalion Argyll and Sutherland Highlanders for his national service. He emigrated to New Zealand in 1953.

== Life in New Zealand ==
After his arrival in New Zealand, Devitt worked on the building of the Tasman pulp and paper mill at Kawerau. In the 1970s and 1980s, he served as the secretary of the Wellington branch, and then national secretary, of the Boilermakers' Union. During this period, the union was involved in a number of high-profile disputes involving heavy engineering projects—most notably the building of the BNZ Centre in Wellington and the expansion of the Marsden Point Oil Refinery and the pulp and paper mills at Kinleith and Kawerau—and the Wellington and Kawerau branches were deregistered by prime minister of the day Rob Muldoon.

He became the head of the New Zealand Trade Union Federation, which later merged into the New Zealand Council of Trade Unions.

Devitt died in Wellington in 2014, and his ashes were buried in Karori Cemetery.
