= Yvonne Cartier =

Yvonne Cartier (27 February 1928 – 11 May 2014) was a New Zealand-born ballet dancer and instructor, and mime. Her artistic biography coincides with the rebirth of theatrical dancing in England after World War II.

== Ballet career ==
Born in the Auckland suburb of Saint Heliers on 27 February 1928, Cartier began dancing on stage at the age of four in a pantomime. While studying ballet with Valerie Valeska and Bettina Edwards, she saw the Borovanski Ballet on tour, and decided to make dance her career. In 1946, following in the footsteps of Bettina Edward's student Rowena Jackson, she emigrated to England on scholarship to the Royal Ballet School, studying with Winifred Edwards, George Goncharov, Vera Volkova and Audrey de Vos.

In London, she joined the Saint James' Ballet, run by Alan Carter. With Michel de Lutry (ballet master for the project), his wife Domini Callaghan, and Sonia Hana, Yvonne Cartier took part in one of the very early television programmes, BBC's Ballet for Beginners. When the Ballet for Beginners Company went on tour, it was joined by Ken Russell (later the film-maker), who danced Coppelius to Yvonne Cartier's Swanhilda.

She then took odd jobs in revue theatre in London, such as Sauce Tartare with Audrey Hepburn. It was whilst dancing in cabaret that she came across Larice Arlen, ballet mistress, wife to the managing director of Sadler's Wells Opera.

Larice Arlen pushed Cartier to re-audition for Sadler's Wells Theatre Ballet, which she joined, and there created ballets for John Cranko, Andrée Howard, Walter Gore and Ninette de Valois. At Ninette de Valois' request, she then joined the main company at Covent Garden. There, she also danced all the classics.

== Mime and dance instructor ==
Following a serious injury to the ankle, inoperable at the time, Cartier left England for France in 1957, and worked for 20 years as a mime with the celebrated troupes of Jacques Lecoq and Marcel Marceau, and as choreographer and movement specialist to theatre companies. At the Ecole Charles Dulin, she taught mime and movement, and then acted as assistant to Michael Cacoyannis for Les Troyennes at the Théâtre National Populaire, which production she later staged for the Festival d'Avignon. She also assisted Georges Wilson for his staging of Grandeur et Décadence de la Ville de Mahagonny.

Thereafter, she returned to the classical dance, teaching in several Paris-area Conservatoires, notably the Nadia Boulanger Conservatory.

Cartier trained several high-level artists including Muriel Valtat and Betina Marcolin. She was Consultant to Beryl Morina's authoritative Mime in Ballet (2000). Cartier was the photographic model for Gordon Anthony in Felicity Gray's Ballet for Beginners (1952), and she continued to teach and coach in Paris until her death, on 11 May 2014.
