= Ejército Revolucionario del Pueblo =

Ejército Revolucionario del Pueblo (ERP) or Ejército Popular Revolucionario (EPR) may refer to:

- People's Revolutionary Army (Argentina)
- People's Revolutionary Army (Colombia)
- People's Revolutionary Army (El Salvador)
- Popular Revolutionary Army
