= Van Erp =

Van Erp is a Dutch toponymic surname meaning "from/of Erp". People with this name include:

- Anna Maria van Erp Taalman Kip (1935–2016), Dutch classical scholar
- Bas van Erp (1979–2016), Dutch wheelchair tennis player
- Dirk van Erp (1860–1933), Dutch-born American artisan, coppersmith and metalsmith
- Henrica van Erp (c.1480–1548), Dutch abbess and historian
- Maran van Erp (born 1990), Dutch football defender
- Pepijn van Erp (born 1972), Dutch mathematician and skeptical activist
- Theodoor van Erp (1874–1958), Dutch army engineer and conservation architect of Borobudur
- Willem Frederik van Erp Taalman Kip (1824–1905), Dutch Navy officer; Minister of Defence from 1874 to 1885
