= Mark Cohen (journalist) =

NZ journalist, editor, social reformer

Mark Cohen (26 November 1849 – 3 March 1928) was a New Zealand journalist, newspaper editor, educationalist and social reformer. He was born in London, England on 26 November 1849.

He was a member of the New Zealand Legislative Council from 25 June 1920 to 24 June 1927; and 25 June 1927 to 3 March 1928, when he died. He was appointed by the Reform Government.

He was from Dunedin and Otago. He died at Auckland, where he was staying with his youngest daughter after his wife died.
