= Annie Rudman =

Annie Rudman (23 March 1844 – 15 August 1928) was a New Zealand Salvation Army officer and social worker.

== Biography ==
She was born at Bedwell Park, near Essendon, Hertfordshire, England, in 1844.

She died on 15 August 1928, aged 84.
