= John Stoke (doctor) =

New Zealand doctor

John Charles Jamieson Stoke (1928–2000) was an English-New Zealand medical doctor. He was Director of Public Health in New Zealand from 1986 to 1987.

== Early life and education ==
Stoke was born on 14 August 1928, in Leigh-on-Sea, in Essex, England. Stoke's father was the son of Polish immigrants who came to England under a church sponsorship in the 1880s. His mother was the daughter of a Scottish marine engineer. His parents met (in London) through church activities and married in 1918.

When World War II broke out, the family had to move from Essex for safety reasons to Surrey. Stoke gained a scholarship and went to school at the King Edward 6th Grammar School in Guildford. In 1943, the family returned to Leigh-on-Sea, and Stoke attended the local grammar school in Westcliff. He passed his matriculation exam in 1944 with distinction in history, Latin, and maths.

In 1946, Stoke was accepted for medical training at St Bartholomew's Hospital in London.

== In Zimbabwe ==
After graduating from medical school, Stoke did "house appointments" in hospitals from 1952 to 1953. He became a Surgeon Lieutenant in the Royal Navy and served there from 1953 to 1957. During this time, Stoke met Bernice and they were married in 1954.

In 1958, the family moved to Southern Rhodesia. Stoke initially worked as a general practitioner in rural areas. During this time he became involved in leprosy work. He trained locals in leprosy treatment, with the result that leper colonies in the area became unnecessary.

After a period as a general practitioner in Salisbury (Harare), Stoke became Senior Medical Officer in the Royal Rhodesian Air Force, and the family moved to (Gwelo). It was during this time that he developed his interest in Occupational and Preventive Medicine.

In 1969, the family returned to Salisbury, and Stoke became a lecturer in Preventive Medicine at the University of Rhodesia, where he worked until 1976. In 1975 he returned to England on sabbatical, and did post-graduate work in Occupational Medicine. During this time the political situation in Rhodesia was deteriorating. Faced with the prospect that his elder sons would soon be drafted into the Rhodesian army, Stoke decided to migrate. After applying for several positions around the world, he was offered a position in New Zealand.

== In New Zealand ==
In 1976, the family migrated to New Zealand, leaving behind the two eldest boys to complete their university studies – Mike in Cape Town and Alan in Salisbury. They settled in Paraparaumu. Stoke initially was Senior Medical Officer with the Ministry of Transport, and then joined the Ministry of Health, with responsibility for Occupational Health.

In 1981, Stoke undertook a World Health Organization (WHO) fellowship, studying the effect of political and socioeconomic systems on occupational health. The four-month fellowship included visits to Canada, USA, Ireland, United Kingdom, the USSR and Sweden.

In 1986, Stoke was appointed Director of Public Health in New Zealand. During this time he also did some lecturing in community health at the Wellington branch of Otago Medical School, and was active in the Asia/Pacific branch of the WHO.

In 1987, complications from cataract surgery resulted in Stoke's retirement from the Ministry of Health. After some months of convalescence, his vision improved sufficiently for him to work again, and he was appointed co-ordinator of the Occupational Health Task Force of the National Health Institute. Stoke retired again in 1989. John's work with the World Health Organization continued after his retirement. He undertook assignments in the Western Pacific, China, Vietnam and Papua New Guinea.

Stoke died on 27 July 2000, in Auckland.

In 2001 ANZSOM (NZ) - The Australia & New Zealand Society of Occupational Medicine inaugurated the John Stoke Medal in his honour, as a way of recognising special contributions to occupational medicine by its members.
