= Jane Galletly =

British-born New Zealand television scriptwriter

- Born: Jane Beatrice Toft; 24 May 1928; Staveley, Derbyshire, England
- Died: 12 December 2017 (aged 89); Wellington, New Zealand
- Occupation: Television scriptwriter
- Spouse: Kenneth Charles Galletly (m. 1947)

Jane Beatrice Galletly (née Toft, 24 May 1928 – 12 December 2017) was a British-born New Zealand television scriptwriter. Her credits include Close to Home and Shark in the Park in New Zealand, EastEnders and Eldorado in Britain, and The Sullivans in Australia.
