= Effie Newbigging Richardson =

Euphemia "Effie" Newbigging Richardson (née Johnstone, c.1849 – 27 December 1928) was a New Zealand landowner and litigant. She was born in Kilmeny, Islay, Argyllshire, Scotland in about 1849.

She died in Nelson in 1928 and was buried in Wakapuaka Cemetery.
