= Ray Watters =

New Zealand geographer (1928–2024)

- Born: Raymond Frederick Watters; 2 June 1928; Cambridge, New Zealand
- Died: 3 February 2024 (aged 95); Woburn, New Zealand

Academic background
- Education: London School of Economics
- Thesis: The geography of Samoa about 1840 : a study in historical geography (1956)

Academic work
- Discipline: Geography
- Sub-discipline: Rural development and social change in the developing world
- Institutions: Victoria University of Wellington
- Notable ideas: MIRAB model

Raymond Frederick Watters (2 June 1928 – 3 February 2024) was a New Zealand geographer. He conducted interdisciplinary studies and projects for UN agencies, British Overseas Development Administration, NZ Aid and governments of a number of developing countries including Solomon Islands, Kiribati, Tuvalu, Mexico, Venezuela, Peru and Papua New Guinea.

== Biography ==
Watters was born in Cambridge on 2 June 1928. After attaining Bachelor of Arts and MA (Hons) degrees from Auckland and Victoria University Colleges, he completed a PhD at the London School of Economics in 1956 for a thesis on the historical geography of Samoa. He taught at Victoria University of Wellington for 38 years, giving courses on Latin America, historical geography, the Pacific and Chinese peasantry. In 2009, he was honoured with a Distinguished New Zealand Geography Award.

Watters specialised in rural development and social change in the developing world, especially in Oceania (South Pacific), Latin America and Guizhou in south-west China. He had also extensively studied shifting agriculture in the hot, wet tropics, human geography and development problems in tribal and peasant societies at micro, meso and macro levels, and the nature of peasantry in the southern Andes, Peru. Many studies involved geographic, historical, anthropological and economic analyses or synthesis, as well as village fieldwork.

Watters led research projects on the Solomon Islands, resulting in three PhDs and four major reports; the Gilbert and Ellice Islands project, yielding three PhDs and six major reports; and the Ministry of Foreign Affairs project on small island states (with Geoff Bertram), out of which came the MIRAB (migration, remittance, foreign aid, public bureaucracy) model.

Watters died in the Lower Hutt suburb of Woburn on 3 February 2024, at the age of 95.

== Selected publications ==
- Rural Latin America in Transition: Development and Change in Mexico and Venezuela
- Land and Society in New Zealand: Essays in Historical Geography
- Koro, Economic Development and Social Change in Fiji
- Shifting Cultivation in Latin America
- With W. H. GEDDES, ANNE CHAMBERS, BETSY SEWELL, ROGER LAWRENCE – Atoll Economy: Social Change in Kiribati and Tuvalu
- With I. G. Bertram – New Zealand and its Small island Neighbours. A report of NZ policy towards the Cook Islands, Niue, Tokelau, Kiribati and Tuvalu
- Poverty and Peasantry in Peru's Southern Andes, 1963–90
- With T. G. McGee – Asia Pacific. New Geographies of the Pacific Rim
- Journeys Towards Progress: Essays of a Geographer on Development and Change in Oceania
