= William Robinson (cricketer, born 1863) =

New Zealand cricketer

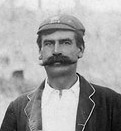
- Robinson in the 1907–08 season

Personal information
- Full name: William Wills Robinson
- Born: 24 November 1863; Cambridge, England
- Died: 21 March 1928 (aged 64); Auckland, New Zealand
- Batting: Right-handed
- Role: Wicketkeeper

Domestic team information
- Years: Team
- 1902/03–1912/13: Auckland

Career statistics
Competition	First-class
Matches	12
Runs scored	85
Batting average	7.72
100s/50s	0/0
Top score	23
Catches/stumpings	12/6
- Source: Cricinfo, 11 November 2017

William Wills Robinson (24 November 1863 – 21 March 1928) was a New Zealand cricketer. He played 12 first-class matches for Auckland between 1902 and 1913.

He was Auckland's regular wicketkeeper in home matches from 1906 to 1913. Only one of his 12 first-class matches was not played in Auckland.

Robinson's parents migrated from England to New Zealand in the 1890s. He and his brother George operated a building business in Auckland for many years. He died after a long illness.
