= Alexander Watt Williamson =

New Zealand schoolteacher (c. 1849–1928)

Alexander Watt Williamson (c. 1849 – 2 August 1928) was a New Zealand schoolteacher. In 1874 he became the first person to receive a degree from a New Zealand university. He received the first and only degree issued by the University of Otago before it merged into the University of New Zealand (which in 1961 was dissolved into four independent universities and two associated agricultural colleges). Later, in 1876, Williamson was reissued a Bachelor of Arts degree certificate from the University of New Zealand.

Born in about 1849 near Coventry, Warwickshire, England, Williamson emigrated to New Zealand with his parents in 1851. After completing his university studies, Williamson became a schoolteacher, first at Turakina School (1874–1881) and then at Pātea. In 1892 he was appointed headmaster of Taita School in Lower Hutt, where he remained until retiring in 1911. Williamson died at his son's residence in Puketaha, near Hamilton, on 2 August 1928.

In 1948 Williamson's certificate was returned to the University of Otago where it was hung in the board room of the university in Dunedin.
