= Energy-related products =

Devices that affect energy consumption, and are subject to Energy Efficiency requirements

Energy-related products (ErP) are items that either consume energy directly or indirectly influence energy consumption. This includes not only devices powered by energy sources such as electricity but also products like water-using appliances, building insulation materials, and windows. These products, along with energy-using products (EuP)—which rely directly on energy input—are subject to energy efficiency regulations within the European Union.

== ErP Directive ==
In November 2009, the Eco-Design Directive 2005/32/EC, originally focused on energy-using products, was replaced by Directive 2009/125/EC, known as the ErP Directive. This updated directive broadened the scope to include not only energy-consuming devices but also energy-related products that have an indirect impact on energy consumption.

The ErP Directive establishes a framework for setting ecodesign requirements for a wide range of products with the objective of reducing environmental impacts throughout their entire lifecycle—from design and production to transportation, usage, and disposal.

== Distinction between ErP and EuP ==
Energy-using products (EuP) are a subset of ErP, comprising items that require an external energy source to function, such as washing machines, televisions, or computers. In contrast, ErP also encompasses products that do not consume energy themselves but contribute to energy savings, such as thermostatic radiator valves or double-glazed windows.

== CE marking ==
Products compliant with the ErP Directive must bear the CE marking, signifying adherence to both product safety and energy efficiency standards. The CE mark enables such products to be freely marketed within the European Economic Area.

== See also ==
- European Ecodesign Directive
- CE marking
- Efficient energy use
