= John Leith (cricketer) =

Australian-born New Zealand cricketer

John Leith (31 May 1857 – 28 July 1928) was an Australian-born New Zealand cricketer who made a single first-class appearance for Otago during the 1880–81 season.

Leith was born at Melbourne in the Colony of Victoria, the eldest son of Peter and Amelia Leith, but educated at the Middle District School in Dunedin. Professionally he worked as a clerk.

Leith played for an Otago of 22 players against the touring Australians in January 1881 before making his only first-class appearance the following month in the fixture against Canterbury, scoring a total of five runs in the match. The following season he played against an English touring team in a team of 18 Otago players.

Leith died at Dunedin in 1928 aged 71.
