= Larry Savage (rugby union) =

- Born: Lawrence Theodore Savage; 17 February 1928 Nelson, New Zealand
- Died: 27 September 2013 (aged 85) Lower Hutt, New Zealand
- Height: 1.65 m (5 ft 5 in)
- Weight: 65 kg (143 lb)
- School: Nelson College
- University: Canterbury University College
- Occupation: Civil engineer

Rugby union career
- Position: Half-back
Provincial / State sides
Years	Team	Apps	(Points)
1947–50	Canterbury	18	
1952–53	Wellington	12	
1955–56	Bush	14	
International career
Years	Team	Apps	(Points)
1949	New Zealand	3	(0)

Lawrence Theodore Savage (17 February 1928 – 27 September 2013) was a New Zealand rugby union player. A half-back, Savage represented Canterbury (while a student at Canterbury University College), Wellington and Bush at a provincial level, and was a member of the New Zealand national side, the All Blacks, in 1949. He played 12 matches for the All Blacks including three internationals.

Savage was educated at Nelson College from 1941 to 1945. He died in 2013. He died in Lower Hutt on 27 September 2013, and his ashes were buried at Taitā Lawn Cemetery.
