= Edward Raymond Horton =

Edward Raymond Horton (28 July 1928 – 10 November 1977) was a New Zealand murderer, in 1948. He was born in Blenheim, New Zealand on 28 July 1928.

He murdered and raped a widow in Wellington in 1948, and his conviction became an influence on the restoration of the death penalty in 1950; although at 20 he was still a juvenile the Capital Punishment Act, 1950 exempted juveniles under 18 only. He was released from prison on a lifetime parole in 1971.

Horton escaped from Mount Eden Prison in 1955. He was arrested by the same officer who had headed the initial arrest in 1948, Cyril Naylor.

Horton died from a heart attack in 1977.
