= Falconer Larkworthy =

- Born: 4 April 1833; Weymouth, Dorset, England
- Died: 14 May 1928 (aged 95)
- Occupations: Banker, financier
- Known for: Banking and financial services in New Zealand

Falconer Larkworthy (4 April 1833 – 14 May 1928) was a New Zealand banker and financier. He was born in Weymouth, Dorset, England, on 4 April 1833.
