= Frederick Earp =

New Zealand goldminer, farmer, and surveyor

- Born: 27 October 1841; Kidderminster, Worcestershire, England
- Died: 8 August 1928 (aged 86)

Frederick Earp (27 October 1841 – 8 August 1928) was a New Zealand goldminer, farmer, surveyor and market gardener. He was born in Kidderminster, Worcestershire, England on 27 October 1841.
