= Basil Church =

Basil Church may refer to:

- Basil Church (cricketer) (1849–1881), New Zealand cricketer
- Basil R. Church (1800–1858), Canadian political figure
