= Basil Church (cricketer) =

New Zealand cricketer

Personal information
- Born: October 1849; Kettering, Northamptonshire, England
- Died: 31 January 1881 (age 31); Melbourne, Victoria, Australia

Domestic team information
- Years: Team
- 1871/72: Otago
- Source: ESPNcricinfo, 7 May 2016

Basil Church (October 1849 – 31 January 1881) was an English-born cricketer. He played one first-class match for Otago in the 1871–72 New Zealand season.

Church was born at Kettering, Northamptonshire in England in 1849, the only son of a Church of England clergyman. He worked as a schoolteacher. His only first-class match was a December 1871 fixture against Canterbury which Otago lost heavily. He scored three runs, 1 in his first innings and 2 not out in the second. This was the only match played in New Zealand during the season which has been given retrospective first-class status.
