= 2012–13 Ford Trophy =

- Dates: 26 February 2013 – 30 March 2013
- Administrator: New Zealand Cricket
- Cricket format: List A cricket
- Tournament format(s): Round-robin and Knockout
- Champions: Auckland Aces (10th title)
- Participants: 6
- Matches: 28
- Most runs: Michael Papps (609)
- Most wickets: Matt Henry (23)
- Official website: www.blackcaps.co.nz

The 2012–13 Ford Trophy was the 42nd season of the official List A cricket tournament in New Zealand, and the second in a sponsorship deal between New Zealand Cricket and Ford Motor Company. The competition ran from 26 February 2013 to 30 March 2013, and was won by the Auckland Aces.

== Teams ==
- Auckland Aces
- Northern Districts Knights
- Central Districts Stags
- Wellington Firebirds
- Canterbury Wizards
- Otago Volts

== Grounds ==
Home Team	Ground Used
Auckland Aces	Eden Park No.2
Northern Knights	Seddon Park
Northern Knights	Bay Oval
Central Stags	Saxton Oval
Central Stags	Pukekura Park
Wellington Firebirds	Basin Reserve
Canterbury Wizards	Hagley Oval
Otago Volts	University Oval
Otago Volts	Queen's Park

== Rules and regulations ==
Every match, points are allocated by the following:

Result	Points Allocated
Win (W)	4
Tie (T), No Result (NR), Abandoned (A)	2
Loss	0

Upon completion of the round-robin stage, the top two teams play each other in the 1st semi-final, with the winner advancing to the final and the loser advancing to the Preliminary Final, where they play the winner of the 2nd semi-final. The winner of the Preliminary Final will then advance to the Final.

== Points table ==
Pos	Team	Pld	W	L	T	NR	BP	Pts	NRR
1	Auckland Aces	8	5	2	0	1	1	23	0.627
2	Canterbury Wizards	8	4	3	0	1	4	22	0.774
3	Wellington Firebirds	8	4	3	0	1	2	20	0.894
4	Northern Knights	8	4	3	0	1	2	20	−0.004
5	Otago Volts	8	2	5	0	1	0	10	−0.698
6	Central Stags	8	2	5	0	1	0	10	−1.435

== Fixtures ==
All times are in New Zealand Daylight Time (NZDT)

26 February 2013
11.00
Scorecard

Canterbury Wizards (H); 269/9 (50 overs)	v	Auckland Aces; 270/5 (48 overs)
74 Peter Fulton; 4/45 Michael Bates		121 Craig Cachopa; 2/52 Logan van der Beek

Auckland Aces won by 5 wickets
Hagley Oval, Christchurch
Umpires: Phil Agent and Tony Gilles

- Canterbury Wizards won the toss and chose to bat
- Donovan Grobbelaar and Matthew Quinn (Auckland) both made their List A debuts.

26 February 2013
11.00
Scorecard

Northern Knights; 322/7 (50 overs)	v	Central Stags (H); 238 (38.3 overs)
95 Daryl Mitchell; 3/64 Adam Milne		75 Ross Taylor; 4/38 Trent Boult

Northern Knights won by 84 runs
Saxton Oval, Nelson
Umpires: Barry Frost and Phil Jones

- Central Stags won the toss and chose to field
- Andrew Mathieson, Will Young (Central Districts) and Cam Fletcher (Northern Districts) all made their List A debuts.

26 February 2013
11.00
Scorecard

Otago Volts; 349/7 (50 overs)	v	Wellington Firebirds (H); 352/4 (48.4 overs)
114 Aaron Redmond; 2/50 Luke Woodcock		162* Michael Papps; 3/63 Jacob Duffy

Wellington Firebirds won by 6 wickets
Basin Reserve, Wellington
Umpires: Tim Parlane and Evan Watkin

- Wellington Firebirds won the toss and chose to field
- Jacob Duffy (Otago) and Tom Blundell (Wellington) both made their List A debuts.

28 February 2013
11.00
Scorecard

Central Stags; 302/7 (50 overs)	v	Wellington Firebirds (H); 292/9 (50 overs)
67 Kieran Noema-Barnett; 3/35 James Franklin		154 Michael Papps; 2/33 Tarun Nethula

Central Stags won by 10 runs
Basin Reserve, Wellington
Umpires: Barry Frost and Phil Jones

- Central Stags won the toss and chose to bat
- Ben Wheeler (Central Districts) made his List A debut.

28 February 2013
11.00
Scorecard

Auckland Aces; 290 (49.3 overs)	v	Northern Knights (H); 294/7 (48.2 overs)
104 Anaru Kitchen; 2/45 Anton Devcich		92 Kane Williamson; 2/38 Kyle Mills

Northern Knights won by 3 wickets
Seddon Park, Hamilton
Umpires: Phil Agent and Tim Parlane

- Northern Knights won the toss and chose to field

28 February 2013
11.00
Scorecard

Canterbury Wizards (H); 283/7 (50 overs)	v	Otago Volts; 177 (38.5 overs)
95 George Worker; 3/39 James McMillan		58 Derek de Boorder; 5/27 Matt Henry

Canterbury Wizards won by 106 runs
Hagley Oval, Christchurch
Umpires: Gary Baxter and Evan Watkin

- Otago Volts won the toss and chose to field

3 March 2013
11.00
Scorecard

Northern Knights; 249/7 (50 overs)	v	Otago Volts (H); 207 (46 overs)
52 Daryl Mitchell; 3/45 Ian Butler		81 Sam Wells; 3/32 Anurag Verma

Northern Knights won by 42 runs
Queen's Park, Invercargill
Umpires: Phil Agent and Barry Frost

- Northern Knights won the toss and chose to bat
- Jono Hickey (Northern Districts) made his List A debut.

3 March 2013
11.00
Scorecard

Canterbury Wizards; 280/4 (50 overs)	v	Central Stags (H); 213 (42 overs)
129* George Worker; 2/41 Ben Wheeler		57 Kieran Noema-Barnett; 5/38 Ryan McCone

Canterbury Wizards won by 67 runs
Saxton Oval, Nelson
Umpires: Ashley Mehrotra and Tim Parlane

- Canterbury Wizards won the toss and chose to bat

3 March 2013
11.00
Scorecard

Wellington Firebirds (H); 318/5 (50 overs)	v	Auckland Aces; 321/6 (50 overs)
98* Harry Boam; 4/43 Kyle Mills		117 Gareth Hopkins; 2/36 Mark Houghton

Auckland Aces won by 4 wickets
Basin Reserve, Wellington
Umpires: Gary Baxter and Evan Watkin

- Auckland Aces won the toss and chose to field
- Tipene Friday (Wellington) made his List A debut.

6 March 2013
11.00
Scorecard

Auckland Aces (H); 356 (49.4 overs)	v	Canterbury Wizards; 343 (49.4 overs)
151 Colin Munro; 6/45 Matt Henry		126 Brad Cachopa; 3/59 Chris Martin

Auckland Aces won by 13 runs
Eden Park No.2, Auckland
Umpires: Phil Agent and Barry Frost

- Canterbury Wizards won the toss and chose to field

6 March 2013
11.00
Scorecard

Central Stags; 417/6 (50 overs)	v	Northern Knights (H); 398 (48.5 overs)
222 Jamie How; 2/73 Anurag Verma		61 Jono Hickey; 3/74 Tarun Nethula

Central Stags won by 19 runs
Seddon Park, Hamilton
Umpires: Derek Walker and Phil Jones

- Central Stags won the toss and chose to bat

6 March 2013
11.00
Scorecard

Wellington Firebirds; 309/4 (39 overs)	v	Otago Volts (H); 287 (38 overs)
82 Michael Papps; 2/58 Jimmy Neesham		68 Derek de Boorder; 5/71 Mark Gillespie

Wellington Firebirds won by 22 runs
Queen's Park, Invercargill
Umpires: Gary Baxter and Tim Parlane

- Otago Volts won the toss and chose to field
- Rain reduced play to 39 overs for both innings

9 March 2013
11.00
Scorecard

Auckland Aces (H); 383/7 (50 overs)	v	Wellington Firebirds; 365 (49.3 overs)
142 Gareth Hopkins; 4/82 Jeetan Patel		129 Michael Papps; 2/43 Donovan Grobbelaar

Auckland Aces won by 18 runs
Eden Park No.2, Auckland
Umpires: Chris Brown and Ashley Mehrotra

- Wellington Firebirds won the toss and chose to field

10 March 2013
11.00
Scorecard

Canterbury Wizards; 362/6 (50 overs)	v	Northern Knights (H); 254 (39.4 overs)
171* Rob Nicol; 2/61 Jono Boult		58 Anurag Verma; 3/64 Ryan McCone

Canterbury Wizards won by 108 runs
Bay Oval, Mt Maunganui
Umpires: Tim Parlane and Derek Walker

- Canterbury Wizards won the toss and chose to bat

10 March 2013
11.00
Scorecard

Central Stags (H); 283 (49.4 overs)	v	Otago Volts; 287/6 (48.3 overs)
93 Carl Cachopa; 2/23 Nick Beard		76 Neil Broom; 2/57 Andrew Mathieson

Otago Volts won by 4 wickets
Pukekura Park, New Plymouth
Umpires: Barry Frost and Evan Watkin

- Central Stags won the toss and chose to field

13 March 2013
11.00
Scorecard

Auckland Aces (H); 285 (47.5 overs)	v	Central Stags; 74 (23.4 overs)
78 Colin Munro; 3/35 Carl Cachopa		19 Jamie How; 3/33 Chris Martin

Auckland Aces won by 211 runs
Eden Park No.2, Auckland
Umpires: Phil Agent and Tim Parlane

- Auckland Aces won the toss and chose to bat

13 March 2013
11.00
Scorecard

Canterbury Wizards (H); 143 (38.1 overs)	v	Wellington Firebirds; 147/3 (21.3 overs)
41 Shanan Stewart; 5/24 Scott Kuggeleijn		47 Michael Papps; 1/18 Andrew Ellis

Wellington Firebirds won by 7 wickets
Hagley Oval, Christchurch
Umpires: Phil Jones and Evan Watkin

- Wellington Firebirds won the toss and chose to field

13 March 2013
11.00
Scorecard

Northern Knights (H); 301/7 (50 overs)	v	Otago Volts; 209 (43.3 overs)
135 Daniel Flynn; 3/54 James McMillan		52 James Neesham; 2/14 Graeme Aldridge

Northern Knights won by 92 runs
Bay Oval, Mt Maunganui
Umpires: Barry Frost and Tony Gillies

- Northern Knights won the toss and chose to bat

17 March 2013
11.00
Scorecard

Auckland Aces (H)	v	Northern Knights

Match abandoned without a ball bowled
Eden Park No.2
Umpires: Phil Jones and Evan Watkin

- Match called off due to rain at 14:25

17 March 2013
11.00
Scorecard

Central Stags (H)	v	Wellington Firebirds

Match abandoned without a ball bowled
Pukekura Park, New Plymouth
Umpires: Phil Agent and Barry Frost

- Match called off due to rain at 14:30

17 March 2013
11.00
Scorecard

Canterbury Wizards (H); 159/4 (39.5 overs)	v	Otago Volts
73* George Worker; 2/57 Samuel Blakely

No result
University Oval, Dunedin
Umpires: Chris Gaffaney and Tim Parlane

- Otago Volts won the toss and chose to field
- Rain caused the abandonment of the match

20 March 2013
11.00
Scorecard

Canterbury Wizards (H); 291/5 (50 overs)	v	Central Stags; 135 (28 overs)
77 Tom Latham; 3/44 Adam Milne		83 Jamie How; 4/23 Logan van Beek

Canterbury Wizards won by 156 runs
Hagley Oval, Christchurch
Umpires: Phil Jones and Tim Parlane

- Central Stags won the toss and chose to field

20 March 2013
11.00
Scorecard

Auckland Aces; 221 (49.2 overs)	v	Otago Volts (H); 222/4 (45.3 overs)
51 Craig Cachopa; 4/34 Jimmy Neesham		66* Nathan McCullum; 2/49 Bhupinder Singh

Otago Volts won by 6 wickets
University Oval, Dunedin
Umpires: Chris Gaffaney and Evan Watkin

- Auckland Aces won the toss and chose to bat

20 March 2013
11.00
Scorecard

Wellington Firebirds (H); 280/7 (50 overs)	v	Northern Knights; 174 (39.3 overs)
114 James Franklin; 2/50 Brent Arnel		49 Corey Anderson; 6/38 Mark Gillespie

Wellington Firebirds won by 106 runs
Basin Reserve, Wellington
Umpires: Phil Agent and Derek Walker

- Northern Knights won the toss and chose to field

== Knockout stage ==
Upon completion of the round-robin stage, the top two teams play each other in the 1st semi-final, with the winner advancing to the final and the loser advancing to the Preliminary Final, where they play the winner of the 2nd semi-final. The winner of the Preliminary Final will then advance to the Final.

Semifinals
24 March 2013 – Seddon Park, Hamilton
Auckland Aces	314/9
Canterbury Wizards	186
24 March 2013 – Basin Reserve, Wellington
Wellington Firebirds	144/2
Northern Knights	140

Preliminary final
27 March 2013 – Hagley Oval, Christchurch
Canterbury Wizards	198
Wellington Firebirds	137

Grand final
31 March 2013 – Eden Park No.2, Auckland
Auckland Aces	143/7
Canterbury Wizards	139

=== Semi-finals ===
24 March 2013
10:30
Scorecard

Auckland Aces (H); 314/9 (50 overs)	v	Canterbury Wizards; 186 (43.4 overs)
118 Colin Munro; 3/48 Ryan McCone		71 Shanan Stewart; 5/21 Chris Martin

Auckland Aces won by 128 runs
Seddon Park, Hamilton
Umpires: Barry Frost and Chris Gaffaney

- Auckland Aces won the toss and chose to bat
- Auckland progress to Final, Canterbury progress to Preliminary Final

24 March 2013
10.30
Scorecard

Northern Knights; 140 (36.1 overs)	v	Wellington Firebirds (H); 144/2 (22.4 overs)
46 Anton Devcich; 4/21 Jeetan Patel		76 Luke Ronchi; 1/28 Daniel Vettori

Wellington Firebirds won by 8 wickets
Basin Reserve, Wellington
Umpires: Tim Parlane and Evan Watkin

- Wellington Firebirds won the toss and chose to field
- Wellington progress to Preliminary Final, Northern Districts are eliminated

=== Preliminary final ===
27 March 2013
10.30
Scorecard

Canterbury Wizards (H); 198 (45.5 overs)	v	Wellington Firebirds; 137 (42.3 overs)
44 Tom Latham; 3/22 Luke Woodcock		63 Grant Elliott; 4/14 Matt Henry

Canterbury Wizards won by 61 runs
Hagley Oval, Christchurch
Umpires: Phil Jones and Derek Walker

- Canterbury Wizards won the toss and chose to bat
- Canterbury progress to final, Wellington are eliminated

=== Final ===
31 March 2013
10.30
Scorecard

Canterbury Wizards; 139 (34.5 overs)	v	Auckland Aces (H); 143/7 (25.1 overs)
42 Tom Latham; 3/30 Michael Bates		37 Anaru Kitchen; 3/31 Ryan McCone

Auckland Aces won by 3 wickets
Eden Park No.2, Auckland
Umpires: Chris Gaffaney and Derek Walker

- Auckland Aces won the toss and chose to field

== See also ==
- Ford Trophy
- 2011-12 Ford Trophy
