= 2012–13 Plunket Shield season =

Cricket tournament in New Zealand

2012–13 Plunket Shield
- Administrator: New Zealand Cricket
- Cricket format: First-class
- Tournament format: Double round-robin
- Champions: Central Districts (9th title)
- Participants: 6
- Matches: 30
- Most runs: Aaron Redmond - 941
- Most wickets: Brent Arnel - 45; Mark Gillespie - 45

The 2012–13 Plunket Shield season was the 87th season of official first-class domestic cricket in New Zealand. The season started on 27 October 2012 and ran to 23 February 2013. Central Districts won the tournament.

== Teams ==
- Auckland
- Northern Districts
- Wellington
- Central Districts
- Canterbury
- Otago

== Grounds ==
Ground Used	Home Team
Eden Park No.2 Ground	Auckland
Cobham Oval	Northern Districts
Seddon Park	Northern Districts
Harry Barker Reserve	Northern Districts
Nelson Park	Central Districts
McLean Park	Central Districts
Saxton Oval	Central Districts
Basin Reserve	Wellington
Karori Park	Wellington
MainPower Oval	Canterbury
Hagley Oval	Canterbury
University Oval	Otago
Queenstown Events Centre	Otago

== Points Distribution ==
Result	Points
Won	12
Lost	0
Drawn	0
Tied	6
Abandoned	2

Batting Bonus Points are awarded in relation to the number of runs scored after 110 overs are bowled in the first innings.

Runs Scored	Points Awarded
250-299	1
300-349	2
350-399	3
400+	4

Bowling Bonus Points are awarded in relation to the number of wickets taken after 110 overs are bowled in the first innings.

Wickets Taken	Points Awarded
3-4	1
5-6	2
7-8	3
9-10	4

== Points Table ==
Team	Played	Won	Lost	Tied	Drawn	Bat.	Bowl.	Total points	NR/W
Central Districts	10	6	2	0	2	21	39	132	7.203
Otago	10	5	2	0	3	24	38	122	7.700
Northern Districts	10	4	3	0	3	13	39	100	3.581
Wellington	10	3	5	0	2	22	31	89	-8.648
Canterbury	10	3	5	0	2	13	39	88	-3.839
Auckland	10	2	6	0	2	13	32	69	-6.411

== Results ==
27–30 October 2012
Scorecard

Canterbury	v	Otago
297 (81.1 overs); Todd Astle 95 (106); Neil Wagner 4/67 (24 overs)		383 (110 overs); Aaron Redmond 133 (218); Tim Johnston 5/105 (41 overs)
352 (113.3 overs); Dean Brownlie 113 (231); Mark Craig 5/120 (45.3 overs)		267/2 (68.5 overs); Aaron Redmond 123 (186); Tim Johnston 1/91 (27 overs)

Otago won by 8 wickets
Mainpower Oval, Rangiora
Umpires: Derek Walker and Phil Agent
Player of the match: Aaron Redmond (Otago)

- Canterbury won the toss and chose to bat

28–31 October 2012
Scorecard

Central Districts	v	Wellington
383/8 dec. 143 Mathew Sinclair; 3/66 Andy McKay		340; 117* Jesse Ryder; 3/68 Ben Wheeler
298/7 dec. 85 Doug Bracewell; 2/18 Grant Elliott		343/5; 174 Jesse Ryder; 2/66 Doug Bracewell

Wellington won by 5 wickets
Nelson Park, Napier
Umpires: Chris Gaffaney and Evan Watkin

- Wellington won the toss and chose to bowl

4–7 November 2012
Scorecard

Central Districts	v	Auckland
430/9 dec. 179* Carl Cachopa; 3/107 Mitchell McClenaghan		210; 56* Bruce Martin; 4/65 Andrew Lamb
149/6; 48 Jeet Raval; 3/44 Bruce Martin		365; 103 Colin Munro; 4/67 Tarun Nethula

Central Districts won by 4 wickets
Nelson Park, Napier
Umpires: Phil Jones and Wayne Knights

- Auckland won the toss and decided to bowl
- Auckland followed on

4–7 November 2012
Scorecard

Northern Districts	v	Otago
204; 48 Ish Sodhi; 4/39 Ian Butler		298; 124 James Neesham; 5/74 Brent Arnel
533/6 dec. 182 Daniel Flynn; 2/89 Ian Butler		353/8; 146* Neil Broom; 3/74 Jimmy Baker

Match Drawn
Seddon Park, Hamilton
Umpires: Gary Baxter and Tim Parlane

- Otago won the toss and decided to bowl

10–13 November 2012
Scorecard

Auckland	v	Northern Districts
392; 114 Bruce Martin; 3/74 Graeme Aldridge		208; 106 Joseph Yovich; 4/43 Bruce Martin
14/0; 10* Lou Vincent		196; 42 Joseph Yovich; 3/63 Bruce Martin

Auckland won by 10 wickets
Eden Park No.2, Auckland
Umpires: Evan Watkin and Wayne Knights

- Auckland won the toss and chose to bowl

12–15 November 2012
Scorecard

Otago	v	Canterbury
272; 46 Hamish Rutherford; 3/88 Tim Johnston		254; 102 Peter Fulton; 3/28 Mark Craig
203/7; 61 Aaron Redmond; 3/35 Ben McCord		252/9 dec. 108 Peter Fulton; 2/38 Ian Butler

Match Drawn
University Oval, Dunedin
Umpires: Chris Gaffaney and Barry Frost

- Canterbury won the toss and chose to bat

17–20 November 2012
Scorecard

Northern Districts	v	Central Districts
183; 53 Adam Wheater; 3/15 Carl Cachopa		341; 73 Jeet Raval; 4/59 James Baker
252; 83 Daryl Mitchell; 4/38 Ben Wheeler		95/2; 57* Jeet Raval; 2/22 Brent Arnel

Central Districts won by 8 wickets
Harry Barker Reserve, Gisborne
Umpires: Gary Baxter and Derek Walker

- Central Districts won the toss and chose to field

19–22 November 2012
Scorecard

Canterbury	v	Wellington
301/8 dec. 133 Dean Brownlie; 4/74 Mark Gillespie		239; 77 Mark Gillespie; 6/58 Andrew Ellis
303/4; 104 Peter Fulton; 2/79 Scott Kuggeleijn		364/5 dec. 206* Michael Papps; 2/59 George Worker

Canterbury won by 6 wickets
Mainpower Oval, Rangiora
Umpires: Phil Jones and Tim Parlane

- Canterbury won the toss and decided to bowl

26–29 November 2012
Scorecard

Central Districts	v	Otago
476; 123 Carl Cachopa; 3/116 Blair Soper		257; 78 Sam Wells; 5/47 Adam Milne
21/0; 14* Jeet Raval		239 (f/o); 57 Aaron Redmond; 5/39 Andrew Mathieson

Central Districts won by 10 wickets
McLean Park, Napier
Umpires: Barry Frost and Evan Watkin

- Otago won the toss and chose to field

26–29 November 2012
Scorecard

Auckland	v	Wellington
658/9 dec. 269* Colin Munro; 4/166 Mark Gillespie		380; 127 Luke Ronchi; 4/90 Mitchell McClenaghan
		145/2; 60* Josh Brodie; 1/34 Kyle Mills

Match Drawn
Eden Park No.2, Auckland
Umpires: Phil Agent and Tim Parlane

- Auckland the toss and chose to field

2–5 December 2012
Scorecard

Auckland	v	Otago
196; 59 Colin Munro; 5/57 Ian Butler		253; 98 Aaron Redmond; 5/53 Dean Bartlett
274; 118 Colin Munro; 4/61 Ian Butler		223/7; 77 Nathan McCullum; 3/48 Mitchell McClenaghan

Otago won by 3 wickets
Eden Park No.2, Auckland
Umpires: Wayne Knights and Mick Martell

- Otago won the toss and decided to field

2–5 December 2012
Scorecard

Northern Districts	v	Canterbury
200; 47 James Marshall; 4/48 Ryan McCone		186; 89 Gareth Andrew; 5/45 Graeme Aldridge
410/5 dec. 128 Joseph Yovich; 2/43 Ryan McCone		112/2; 68* Peter Fulton; 1/22 Graeme Aldridge

Match drawn
Seddon Park, Hamilton
Umpires: Gary Baxter and Chris Gaffaney

- Canterbury won the toss and decided to field

10–13 December 2012
Scorecard

Wellington	v	Central Districts
403; 162 Jesse Ryder; 3/62 Ajaz Patel		260; 121 Will Young; 3/53 Scott Kuggeleijn
248/3; 142* Scott Kuggeleijn; 2/41 Andrew Lamb		389; 90 Carl Cachopa; 4/71 James Franklin

Wellington won by 7 wickets
Karori Park, Wellington
Umpires: Dillon Walker and Evan Watkin

- Wellington won the toss and chose to bowl

16–19 December 2012
Scorecard

Auckland	v	Canterbury
307; 122* Gareth Hopkins; 5/56 Ryan McCone		405/9 dec. 180* Gareth Andrew; 5/109 Kyle Mills
219/3; 77* Tim McIntosh; 1/27 Edward Nuttall		120; 39 Dean Brownlie; 5/38 Kyle Mills

Auckland won by 7 wickets
Eden Park No.2, Auckland
Umpires: Barry Frost and Tim Parlane

- Canterbury won the toss and decided to bat

17–20 December 2012
Scorecard

Otago	v	Central Districts
427; 118 Ryan ten Doeschate; 4/86 Ajaz Patel		449; 142 Mathew Sinclair; 4/103 Neil Wagner
227/4 dec. 65 Neil Wagner; 2/24 Jeet Raval

Match drawn
University Oval, Dunedin
Umpires: Chris Gaffaney and Gary Baxter

- Otago won the toss and decided to bat

17–20 December 2012
Scorecard

Wellington	v	Northern Districts
206; 113 Luke Ronchi; 5/69 Tim Southee		403/8 dec. 156 Tim Southee; 3/102 Jeetan Patel
390; 108 Luke Ronchi; 5/128 Ish Sodhi		196/4; 121 Kane Williamson; 1/14 Ili tugaga

Northern Districts won by 6 wickets
Karori Park, Wellington
Umpires: Dillon Walker and Wayne Knights

- Northern Districts won the toss and decided to bat

24–27 January 2013
Scorecard

Central Districts	v	Canterbury
303/8 dec. 86 Mathew Sinclair; 3/55 Ryan McCone		292; 88 Dean Brownlie; 4/40 Kyle Jarvis
320; 90 Kieran Noema-Barnett; 4/82 Ryan McCone		250; 59 Peter Fulton; 6/57 Ajaz Patel

Central Districts won by 81 runs
Mclean Park, Napier
Umpires: Evan Watkin and Tim Parlane

- Central Districts won the toss and chose to bat

24–27 January 2013
Scorecard

Northern Districts	v	Auckland
614/7 dec. 166 Daniel Flynn; 3/149 Chris Martin		240; 141* Dusan Hakaraia; 7/82 Anurag Verma
		284; 115 Craig Cachopa; 4/37 Jono Boult

Northern Districts won by an innings and 90 runs
Seddon Park, Hamilton
Umpires: Chris Gaffaney and Dillon Walker

- Northern Districts won the toss and decided to bowl

24–27 January 2013
Scorecard

Otago	v	Wellington
651/9 dec. 190 Michael Bracewell; 4/161 Mark Gillespie		254; 48 Stephen Murdoch; 5/76 Blair Soper
		157; 49 Luke Ronchi; 6/24 James Fuller

Otago won by an innings and 240 runs
University Oval, Dunedin
Umpires: Ravindra Wimalasiri and Wayne Knights

- Otago won the toss and chose to bowl

30 January - 2 February 2013
Scorecard

Auckland	v	Central Districts
348; 145 Craig Cachopa; 5/61 Bevan Small		233; 67 Kieran Noema-Barnett; 4/44 Michael Bates
151; 43 Gareth Hopkins; 6/55 Tarun Nethula		457/7 dec. 124 Jamie How; 3/71 Michael Bates

Central Districts won by 191 runs
Eden Park No.2, Auckland
Umpires: Paul Jones and Ravindra Wimalasiri

- Auckland won the toss and decided to bowl

31 January - 3 February 2013
Scorecard

Otago	v	Northern Districts
319; 162 Hamish Rutherford; 4/98 Brent Arnel		217; 60 Daryl Mitchell; 6/65 Ian Butler
126/2; 56* Aaron Redmond; 1/24 Jono Boult		227; 56 Brad Wilson; 4/46 Ian Butler

Otago won by 8 wickets
Queenstown Events Centre, Queenstown
Umpires: Gary Baxter and Karl Hurter

- Otago won the toss and decided to bowl

31 January - 3 February 2013
Scorecard

Wellington	v	Canterbury
356; 102 Stephen Murdoch; 2/51 Ryan McCone		329/9 dec. 94 Peter Fulton; 3/33 Harry Boam
363; 91 Grant Elliott; 3/26 Ryan McCone		410/7 dec. 107 George Worker; 4/67 Tipene Friday

Canterbury won by 20 runs
Basin Reserve
Umpires: Tim Parlane and Wayne Knights

- Canterbury won the toss and decided to bat

7–10 February 2013
Scorecard

Canterbury	v	Northern Districts
172; 52 Peter Fulton; 5/55 Brent Arnel		108; 36 James Marshall; 5/20 Matt McEwan
149; 42 Tom Latham; 3/35 Graeme Aldridge		217/4; 75* BJ Watling; 3/73 Ryan McCone

Northern Districts won by 6 wickets
Hagley Oval, Christchurch
Umpires: Chris Brown and Evan Watkin

- Canterbury won the toss and chose to bat

7–10 February 2013
Scorecard

Wellington	v	Auckland
426; 135 Luke Ronchi; 3/96 Kyle Mills		346; 99* Colin de Grandhomme; 5/66 Mark Gillespie
199/8; 86 Josh Brodie; 3/26 Chris Martin		345; 121 Gareth Hopkins; 6/83 Mark Gillespie

Match Drawn
Basin Reserve, Wellington
Umpires: Karl Hurter and Phil Jones

- Wellington won the toss and chose to field

14–17 February 2013
Scorecard

Canterbury	v	Central Districts
252; 81 Tom Latham; 7/35 Doug Bracewell		249; 61 Doug Bracewell; 3/43 Ben McCord
255; 135* Dean Brownlie; 5/49 Andrew Lamb		259/6; 81 Jamie How; 3/60 Matt McEwan

Central Districts won by 4 wickets
Mainpower Oval, Rangiora
Umpires: Barry Frost and Tony Gilles

- Central Districts won the toss and chose to field

14–17 February 2013
Scorecard

Northern Districts	v	Wellington
510; 136 Daryl Mitchell; 5/72 Scott Kuggeleijn		423; 102 Harry Boam; 4/97 Tim Southee
148/5; 51* Daryl Mitchell; 3/44 Mark Gillespie		234; 49 Josh Brodie; 5/52 Tim Southee

Northern Districts won by 5 wickets
Cobham Oval, Whangārei
Umpires: Peter Gasston and Wayne Knights

- Northern Districts won the toss and chose to field

14–17 February 2013
Scorecard

Otago	v	Auckland
569/8 dec. 188 Nick Beard; 3/168 Bhupinder Singh		221; 74 Anaru Kitchen; 5/54 Neil Wagner
4/0; 4* Aaron Redmond		351; 81 Craig Cachopa; 4/74 Sam Wells

Otago won by 10 wickets
University Oval, Dunedin
Umpires: Phil Jones and Ashley Mehrotra

- Auckland won the toss and chose to bat

20–23 February 2013
Scorecard

Canterbury	v	Auckland
302; 98 Peter Fulton; 3/53 Lachie Ferguson		173; 41 Anaru Kitchen; 5/42 Shanan Stewart
43/1; 19* Peter Fulton; 1/14 Matthew Quinn		170; 66* Gareth Hopkins; 3/33 Ryan McCone

Canterbury won by 9 wickets
Hagley Oval, Christchurch
Umpires: Derek Walker and Evan Watkin

- Canterbury won the toss and chose to field

20–23 February 2013
Scorecard

Central Districts	v	Northern Districts
418; 121 Jeet Raval; 3/83 Jono Boult		267; 72 Daryl Mitchell; 3/35 Ben Wheeler
116/2; 84* Jamie How; 1/17 Jono Boult		435/9 dec. 156* James Marshall; 5/91 Ben Wheeler

Match Drawn
Saxton Oval, Nelson
Umpires: Barry Frost and Tim Parlane

- Central Districts won the toss and chose to field

20–23 February 2013
Scorecard

Wellington	v	Otago
255; 63 Michael Papps; 3/39 Jimmy Neesham		378; 152 Aaron Redmond; 5/80 Jeetan Patel
322; 68 Scott Kuggeleijn; 4/92 Neil Wagner		145; 49 Jimmy Neesham; 4/50 Mark Gillespie

Wellington won by 54 runs
Basin Reserve, Wellington
Umpires: Phil Agent and Wayne Knights

- Otago won the toss and chose to field

== Statistics ==
=== Most Runs ===
Player	Team	Innings	Runs	Average	100s	50s	HS
(New Zealand) Aaron Redmond	Otago	19	941	55.35	3	6	152
(New Zealand) Peter Fulton	Canterbury	18	902	56.37	3	7	108
(New Zealand) Michael Papps	Wellington	20	810	45.00	2	5	206*
(New Zealand) Luke Ronchi	Wellington	15	807	62.07	4	1	135
(New Zealand) Carl Cachopa	Central Districts	18	807	47.47	3	3	179*
(New Zealand) Craig Cachopa	Auckland	16	795	49.68	3	3	166
(New Zealand) Jeet Raval	Central Districts	19	750	44.11	1	6	121
(New Zealand) Dean Brownlie	Canterbury	19	743	43.70	3	2	135*
(New Zealand) Jesse Ryder	Wellington	15	723	51.64	3	2	174
(New Zealand) Daryl Mitchell	Northern Districts	15	709	54.53	1	7	136

=== Most Wickets ===
Player	Team	Matches	Overs	Wickets	Average
(New Zealand) Brent Arnel	Northern Districts	10	347.5	45	24.84
(New Zealand) Mark Gillespie	Wellington	9	364	45	31.37
(New Zealand) Ian Butler	Otago	9	292	39	25.12
(New Zealand) Ryan McCone	Canterbury	7	231	37	19.43
(New Zealand) Bruce Martin	Auckland	10	408.1	32	40.40
(New Zealand) Neil Wagner	Otago	7	250.3	30	25.43
(New Zealand) Doug Bracewell	Central Districts	5	191.3	23	25.60
(New Zealand) Michael Bates	Auckland	8	199.3	22	30.20
(New Zealand) Tarun Nethula	Central Districts	8	230	22	36.95
(New Zealand) Scott Kuggeleijn	Wellington	8	196.2	22	43.81

=== High Scores ===
Player	Team	Runs
(New Zealand) Colin Munro	Auckland	269*
(New Zealand) Michael Papps	Wellington	206*
(New Zealand) Michael Bracewell	Otago	190
(New Zealand) Nick Beard	Otago	188
(New Zealand) Daniel Flynn	Canterbury	180*

=== Best Bowling ===
Player	Team	Bowling Figures
(New Zealand) Doug Bracewell	Central Districts	7/35
(New Zealand) Anurag Verma	Northern Districts	7/82
(New Zealand) James Fuller	Otago	6/24
(New Zealand) Tarun Nethula	Central Districts	6/55
(New Zealand) Ajaz Patel	Central Districts	6/57

== See also ==
- Plunket Shield
- 2012–13 Ford Trophy
- 2012–13 HRV Cup
