= 2012–13 HRV Cup =

- Administrator: New Zealand Cricket
- Cricket format: Twenty20
- Tournament format: Double round-robin
- Champions: Otago Volts (2nd title)
- Participants: 6
- Matches: 32
- Most runs: Jesse Ryder (584)
- Most wickets: Nick Beard, Jacob Duffy (15)

The 2012–13 HRV Cup (named after the competition's sponsor HRV) was the eighth season of the Men's Super Smash Twenty20 cricket tournament in New Zealand. The season was held between 2 November 2012 and 20 January 2013. 12 matches were telecasted on Friday nights during November and December.

== Rules and regulations ==
Points
Results	Points
Win	4 points
No result	2 points
Loss	0 points

If a match ends with the scores level, the tie is broken with a Super Over.

== Teams and standings ==
Pos	Team	Pld	W	L	T	NR	Pts	NRR
1	Otago Volts	10	9	1	0	0	36	1.019
2	Wellington Firebirds	10	6	4	0	0	24	0.410
3	Auckland Aces	10	5	5	0	0	20	0.127
4	Northern Knights	10	5	5	0	0	20	−0.130
5	Canterbury Wizards	10	3	7	0	0	12	−0.423
6	Central Districts Stags	10	2	8	0	0	8	−1.026

Source: Full table on ESPN Cricinfo

(C) = Eventual champion; (R) = Runner-up.
Winner will qualify for the qualifying stage of the 2013 Champions League Twenty20.

== League progression ==
	Group matches										Knockout	
Team	1	2	3	4	5	6	7	8	9	10	PF	F
Auckland Aces	4	8	8	8	8	8	12	12	16	20	L	
Canterbury Wizards	0	0	0	0	4	8	8	12	12	12		
Central Districts Stags	0	0	0	4	4	4	4	8	8	8		
Northern Knights	4	8	12	12	16	16	20	20	20	20		
Otago Volts	0	4	8	12	16	20	24	28	32	36		W
Wellington Firebirds	4	4	8	8	12	16	16	20	20	24	W	L

Win	Loss

Note: The total points at the end of each group match are listed.
Note: Click on the points (group matches) or W/L (knockout) to see the summary for the match.

== Results ==
Visitor team →	Auckland	Canterbury	Central Districts	Northern Districts	Otago	Wellington
Home team ↓	Auckland	Canterbury	Central Districts	Northern Districts	Otago	Wellington
Auckland Aces		Auckland; 8 runs	Auckland; 6 wickets (D/L)	Northern Districts; 23 runs (D/L)	Otago; 5 wickets	Wellington; 10 runs
Canterbury Wizards	Auckland; 4 wickets		Canterbury; 4 wickets	Canterbury; 8 runs	Otago; 1 run	Wellington; 57 runs
Central Districts Stags	Central Districts; 7 wickets	Canterbury; 5 runs		Central Districts; 43 runs	Otago; 3 wickets	Wellington; 55 runs
Northern Knights	Auckland; 28 runs	Northern Districts; 5 runs	Northern Districts; 6 wickets		Otago; 11 runs	Northern Districts; 9 wickets
Otago Volts	Otago; 13 runs	Otago; 3 wickets	Otago; 93 runs	Northern Districts; 24 runs		Otago; 82 runs
Wellington Firebirds	Auckland; 5 wickets	Wellington; 6 wickets	Wellington; 53 runs	Wellington; 9 runs	Otago; 12 runs	

Note: Click on the results to see match summary.

Home team won	Visitor team won	Match abandoned

== Fixtures ==
All times shown are in New Zealand Daylight Time (UTC+13).

=== Group stage ===
2 November
19:10 (D/N)
Scorecard

Northern Knights; 174/7 (20 overs)	v	(H) Otago Volts; 150/6 (20 overs)
Steven Croft 81 (49); Neil Wagner 3/39 (4 overs)		Hamish Rutherford 47 (44); Anton Devcich 2/13 (2 overs)

Northern Knights won by 24 runs
Seddon Park, Hamilton
Umpires: Phil Jones and Tim Parlane

- Northern Knights won the toss and elected to bat.

9 November
19:10 (D/N)
Scorecard

Canterbury Wizards; 147/6 (20 overs)	v	(H) Wellington Firebirds; 148/4 (17 overs)
Bradley Cachopa 67* (58); Grant Elliott 2/6 (2 overs)		Jesse Ryder 90* (57); Ben Laughlin 3/30 (4 overs)

Wellington Firebirds won by 6 wickets
Westpac Stadium, Wellington
Umpires: Gary Baxter and Barry Frost

- Canterbury Wizards won the toss and elected to bat.

16 November
19:10 (D/N)
Scorecard

(H) Wellington Firebirds; 116 (20 overs)	v	Auckland Aces; 117/5 (17.1 overs)
Cameron Borgas 50 (43); Brad Hodge 3/16 (3 overs)		Lou Vincent 45 (46); Luke Woodcock 2/28 (4 overs)

Auckland Aces won by 5 wickets
Westpac Stadium, Wellington
Umpires: Phil Agent and Barry Frost

- Auckland Aces won the toss and elected to field.

23 November
19:10 (D/N)
Scorecard

Central Districts Stags; 149/6 (20 overs)	v	(H) Northern Knights; 153/4 (19.1 overs)
Carl Cachopa 64* (33); Steven Croft 2/12 (2 overs)		Steven Croft 59* (48); Ben Wheeler 2/23 (3.1 overs)

Northern Knights won by 6 wickets
Seddon Park, Hamilton
Umpires: Phil Agent and Wayne Knights

- Central Districts Stags won the toss and elected to bat.

30 November
19:10 (D/N)
Scorecard

(H) Northern Knights; 186/5 (20 overs)	v	Canterbury Wizards; 181/7 (20 overs)
Anton Devcich 62 (43); Ronnie Hira 1/24 (4 overs)		Bradley Cachopa 58 (40); Corey Anderson 1/17 (2 overs)

Northern Knights won by 5 runs
Seddon Park, Hamilton
Umpires: Phil Jones and Evan Watkin

- Canterbury Wizards won the toss and elected to field.

7 December
19:10 (D/N)
Scorecard

Wellington Firebirds; 214/5 (20 overs)	v	(H) Central Districts Stags; 159 (19 overs)
Jesse Ryder 75 (26); Carl Cachopa 1/24 (3 overs)		Will Young 34 (27); Chris Woakes 3/27 (4 overs)

Wellington Firebirds won by 55 runs
McLean Park, Napier
Umpires: Chris Gaffaney and Mick Martell

- Central Districts Stags won the toss and elected to field.

14 December
19:10 (D/N)
Scorecard

Otago Volts; 173/7 (20 overs)	v	(H) Northern Knights; 162/8 (20 overs)
Ryan ten Doeschate 65 (45); Brent Arnel 2/40 (4 overs)		BJ Watling 35 (17); Nick Beard 3/26 (4 overs)

Otago Volts won by 11 runs
Seddon Park, Hamilton
Umpires: Wayne Knights and Tim Parlane

- Otago Volts won the toss and elected to bat.

21 December
19:00 (D/N)
Scorecard

(H) Auckland Aces; 197/7 (20 overs)	v	Canterbury Wizards; 189/6 (20 overs)
Gareth Hopkins 64 (37); Logan van Beek 2/25 (3 overs)		George Worker 68 (53); Andre Adams 4/20 (4 overs)

Auckland Aces won by 8 runs
Eden Park, Auckland
Umpires: Phil Jones and Wayne Knights

- Canterbury Wizards won the toss and elected to field.

23 December
14:00
Scorecard

(H) Otago Volts; 204/3 (20 overs)	v	Wellington Firebirds; 122 (17.4 overs)
Ryan ten Doeschate 60* (29); Jesse Ryder 1/18 (2.3 overs)		Jesse Ryder 37 (28); Nick Beard 4/16 (4 overs)

Otago Volts won by 82 runs
University Oval, Dunedin
Umpires: Phil Agent and Tim Parlane

- Wellington Firebirds won the toss and elected to field.

26 December
15:00
Scorecard

(H) Wellington Firebirds; 213/5 (18 overs)	v	Central Districts Stags; 160/5 (18 overs)
Chris Woakes 55* (28); Peter Trego 2/33 (3.5 overs)		Mathew Sinclair 71 (43); Luke Woodcock 2/24 (2 overs)

Wellington Firebirds won by 53 runs
Basin Reserve, Wellington
Umpires: Barry Frost and Evan Watkin

- Central Districts Stags won the toss and elected to field.
- Rain reduced the match to 18 overs per side.

26 December
16:00 (D/N)
Scorecard

Northern Knights; 142/4 (12 overs)	v	(H) Auckland Aces; 49/6 (6 overs)
Scott Styris 68* (26); Kyle Mills 2/17 (3 overs)		Gareth Hopkins 18* (10); Bradley Scott 2/4 (1 over)

Northern Knights won by 23 runs (D/L)
Eden Park, Auckland
Umpires: Phil Agent and Chris Gaffaney

- Auckland Aces won the toss and elected to field.
- Rain first reduced the game to 12 overs per side. Rain then reduced Auckland's innings to 6 overs. Their target was 73 runs from 6 overs according to the Duckworth–Lewis method.

27 December
14:00
Scorecard

Otago Volts; 196/7 (20 overs)	v	(H) Canterbury Wizards; 195/7 (20 overs)
Michael Bracewell 61 (32); Ryan McCone 2/42 (3 overs)		George Worker 47 (30); Ryan ten Doeschate 2/27 (3 overs)

Otago Volts won by 1 run
Aorangi Oval, Timaru
Umpires: Gary Baxter and Derek Walker

- Canterbury Wizards won the toss and elected to field.

28 December
19:00 (D/N)
Scorecard

Wellington Firebirds; 184/6 (20 overs)	v	(H) Auckland Aces; 174/5 (20 overs)
Jesse Ryder 60 (37); Andre Adams 4/25 (4 overs)		Phil Mustard 97* (66); Mark Houghton 1/17 (4 overs)

Wellington Firebirds won by 10 runs
Eden Park, Auckland
Umpires: Phil Jones and Tim Parlane

- Wellington Firebirds won the toss and elected to bat.

29 December
16:00
Scorecard

(H) Central Districts Stags; 186/4 (20 overs)	v	Northern Knights; 143 (18.5 overs)
Mathew Sinclair 71 (52); Steven Croft 1/19 (1 over)		Scott Styris 77 (47); Kyle Jarvis 3/39 (3.5 overs)

Central Districts Stags won by 43 runs
Pukekura Park, New Plymouth
Umpires: Wayne Knights and Evan Watkin

- Northern Knights won the toss and elected to field.

31 December
14:00
Scorecard

(H) Otago Volts; 157/7 (20 overs)	v	Auckland Aces; 144/9 (20 overs)
Ryan ten Doeschate 61 (37); Michael Bates 2/31 (4 overs)		Craig Cachopa 43 (33); Jacob Duffy 4/21 (4 overs)

Otago Volts won by 13 runs
Queenstown Events Centre
Umpires: Chris Gaffaney and Tim Parlane

- Otago Volts won the toss and elected to bat.

1 January
14:00
Scorecard

Central Districts Stags; 152/8 (20 overs)	v	(H) Canterbury Wizards; 153/6 (18.5 overs)
Mathew Sinclair 38 (35); Mitchell Claydon 3/25 (4 overs)		Gareth Andrew 53* (25); Tarun Nethula 2/26 (4 overs)

Canterbury Wizards won by 4 wickets
Saxton Oval, Nelson
Umpires: Phil Jones and Evan Watkin

- Central Districts Stags won the toss and elected to bat.

1 January
16:30
Scorecard

Wellington Firebirds; 197/4 (20 overs)	v	(H) Northern Knights; 200/1 (19 overs)
Tamim Iqbal 68 (49); Bradley Scott 2/46 (4 overs)		Anton Devcich 92* (57); Jesse Ryder 1/32 (4 overs)

Northern Knights won by 9 wickets
Bay Oval, Mount Maunganui
Umpires: Gary Baxter and Barry Frost

- Wellington Firebirds won the toss and elected to bat.

3 January
14:00
Scorecard

Canterbury Wizards; 185/5 (20 overs)	v	(H) Central Districts Stags; 180/3 (20 overs)
Andrew Ellis 55* (34); Marty Kain 2/26 (4 overs)		Will Young 40* (33); Brendon Diamanti 1/36 (4 overs)

Canterbury Wizards won by 5 runs
Saxton Oval, Nelson
Umpires: Wayne Knights and Derek Walker

- Canterbury Wizards won the toss and elected to bat.

4 January
19:00
Scorecard

(H) Auckland Aces; 190/7 (20 overs)	v	Otago Volts; 191/5 (19.4 overs)
Anaru Kitchen 66 (39); Jacob Duffy 3/42 (4 overs)		Neil Broom 60 (40); Kyle Mills 1/33 (4 overs)

Otago Volts won by 5 wickets
Eden Park, Auckland
Umpires: Phil Agent and Gary Baxter

- Auckland Aces won the toss and elected to bat.

6 January
14:00
Scorecard

Wellington Firebirds; 190/2 (20 overs)	v	(H) Canterbury Wizards; 133 (19 overs)
Tamim Iqbal 74 (47); Ronnie Hira 2/32 (4 overs)		Andrew Ellis 48 (39); Ili Tugaga 4/18 (4 overs)

Wellington Firebirds won by 57 runs
Rangiora Recreation Ground, Rangiora
Umpires: Phil Agent and Wayne Knights

- Canterbury Wizards won the toss and elected to field.

6 January
14:00
Scorecard

(H) Otago Volts; 194/4 (20 overs)	v	Central Districts Stags; 101 (17 overs)
Ryan ten Doeschate 59* (32); Marty Kain 2/28 (4 overs)		Jeet Raval 20 (15); Nick Beard 2/10 (3 overs)

Otago Volts won by 93 runs
University Oval, Dunedin
Umpires: Chris Gaffaney and Derek Walker

- Central Districts Stags won the toss and elected to field.

6 January
16:30
Scorecard

Auckland Aces; 180/5 (20 overs)	v	(H) Northern Knights; 152/6 (20 overs)
Colin de Grandhomme 66* (30); Brent Arnel 2/32 (4 overs)		Steven Croft 48 (43); Michael Bates 3/19 (4 overs)

Auckland Aces won by 28 runs
Bay Oval, Mount Maunganui
Umpires: Barry Frost and Phil Jones

- Northern Knights won the toss and elected to field.

9 January
16:00
Scorecard

Auckland Aces; 181/6 (20 overs)	v	(H) Central Districts Stags; 182/3 (19.3 overs)
Colin de Grandhomme 55 (24); Bevan Small 2/23 (2 overs)		Mathew Sinclair 71 (52); Michael Bates 1/28 (3.3 overs)

Central Districts Stags won by 7 wickets
Pukekura Park, New Plymouth
Umpires: Gary Baxter and Tim Parlane

- Auckland Aces won the toss and elected to bat.

11 January
16:30
Scorecard

Otago Volts; 170/6 (20 overs)	v	(H) Wellington Firebirds; 158/6 (20 overs)
Derek de Boorder 67 (44); Ili Tugaga 1/21 (3 overs)		Tamim Iqbal 41 (38); Jimmy Neesham 2/26 (4 overs)

Otago Volts won by 12 runs
Basin Reserve, Wellington
Umpires: Gary Baxter and Barry Frost

- Otago Volts won the toss and elected to bat.

11 January
19:10 (D/N)
Scorecard

(H) Canterbury Wizards; 184/8 (20 overs)	v	Northern Knights; 176/8 (20 overs)
Tom Latham 52 (29); Brent Arnel 4/22 (4 overs)		Brad Wilson 36 (29); Ronnie Hira 3/16 (4 overs)

Canterbury Wizards won by 8 runs
Seddon Park, Hamilton
Umpires: Chris Gaffaney and Evan Watkin

- Canterbury Wizards won the toss and elected to bat.

13 January
14:00
Scorecard

(H) Canterbury Wizards; 182/4 (20 overs)	v	Auckland Aces; 184/6 (19.3 overs)
George Worker 89* (60); Matthew Quinn 3/35 (4 overs)		Craig Cachopa 37 (26); Ryan McCone 2/22 (4 overs)

Auckland Aces won by 4 wickets
Rangiora Recreation Ground, Rangiora
Umpires: Chris Gaffaney and Derek Walker

- Canterbury Wizards won the toss and elected to bat.

13 January
15:00
Scorecard

(H) Wellington Firebirds; 181/1 (20 overs)	v	Northern Knights; 172/5 (20 overs)
Jesse Ryder 85* (65); Daryl Tuffey 1/29 (4 overs)		James Marshall 54* (27); Theo Doropoulos 3/24 (4 overs)

Wellington Firebirds won by 9 runs
Basin Reserve, Wellington
Umpires: Gary Baxter and Phil Jones

- Wellington Firebirds won the toss and elected to bat.

13 January
16:00
Scorecard

(H) Central Districts Stags; 163/7 (20 overs)	v	Otago Volts; 166/7 (19.2 overs)
Jeet Raval 49 (39); Ian Butler 3/28 (4 overs)		Hamish Rutherford 36 (19); Kieran Noema-Barnett 2/24 (3.2 overs)

Otago Volts won by 3 wickets
Pukekura Park, New Plymouth
Umpires: Wayne Knights and Evan Watkin

- Central Districts Stags won the toss and elected to bat.

15 January
14:00
Scorecard

Canterbury Wizards; 162/6 (20 overs)	v	(H) Otago Volts; 165/7 (20 overs)
George Worker 58 (44); Nick Beard 3/26 (4 overs)		Aaron Redmond 58 (26); Andrew Ellis 2/14 (4 overs)

Otago Volts won by 3 wickets
University Oval, Dunedin
Umpires: Barry Frost and Chris Gaffaney

- Canterbury Wizards won the toss and elected to bat.

15 January
16:00
Scorecard

Central Districts Stags; 132/7 (18 overs)	v	(H) Auckland Aces; 137/4 (17 overs)
Mathew Sinclair 44 (40); Andre Adams 2/31 (4 overs)		Lou Vincent 52* (39); Marty Kain 2/18 (4 overs)

Auckland won by 6 wickets (D/L)
Eden Park, Auckland
Umpires: Gary Baxter and Tim Parlane

- Central Districts Stags won the toss and elected to bat.
- Rain reduced the match to 18 overs per side and adjusted the Auckland Aces' target to 136 runs from 18 overs.

== Knockout stage ==
=== Preliminary final ===
18 January
Scorecard

(H) Wellington Firebirds; 182/4 (20 overs)	v	Auckland Aces; 159/8 (20 overs)
Michael Papps 70* (48); Matthew Quinn 2/48 (3 overs)		Aaron Finch 44 (30); Luke Woodcock 2/23 (4 overs)

Wellington Firebirds won by 23 runs
Basin Reserve, Wellington
Umpires: Phil Jones and Wayne Knights

- Wellington Firebirds won the toss and elected to bat.

=== Final ===
20 January
Scorecard

Wellington Firebirds; 143/9 (20 overs)	v	(H) Otago Volts; 145/6 (18.3 overs)
Luke Woodcock 40* (31); James Fuller 4/24 (4 overs)		Hamish Rutherford 105* (52); Mark Houghton 2/30 (4 overs)

Otago Volts won by 4 wickets
University Oval, Dunedin
Umpires: Gary Baxter and Chris Gaffaney

- Wellington Firebirds won the toss and elected to bat.
