= 2011–12 Ford Trophy =

2011-12 Ford Trophy
- Dates: 25 November 2011 – 12 February 2012
- Administrator: New Zealand Cricket
- Cricket format: List A cricket
- Tournament format(s): Round-robin and Knockout
- Champions: Central Districts Stags (4th title)
- Participants: 6
- Matches: 28
- Most runs: Brad Cachopa (373)
- Most wickets: Andy McKay (18)

The 2011–12 Ford Trophy was the 41st season of the official List A domestic cricket competition in New Zealand. This season was the first in a sponsorship deal between New Zealand Cricket and Ford Motor Company. The competition ran from 25 November 2011 to 12 February 2012, and was won by the Central Districts Stags.

== Teams ==
- Auckland Aces
- Northern Districts Knights
- Central Districts Stags
- Wellington Firebirds
- Canterbury Wizards
- Otago Volts

== Grounds ==
Ground Used	Home Team
Colin Maiden Park	Auckland Aces
Bay Oval	Northern Knights
Seddon Park	Northern Knights
Nelson Park	Central Stags
Saxton Oval	Central Stags
Pukekura Park	Central Stags
Basin Reserve	Wellington Firebirds
Bert Sutcliffe Oval	Wellington Firebirds
MainPower Oval	Canterbury Wizards
Aorangi Oval	Canterbury Wizards
University Oval	Otago Volts
Queen's Park	Otago Volts

== Points Table ==
Pos	Team	Pld	W	L	T	NR	BP	Pts	NRR
1	Central Stags	8	3	1	0	4	2	22	0.538
2	Auckland Aces	8	4	3	0	1	2	20	0.084
3	Otago Volts	8	3	2	0	3	1	19	0.396
4	Canterbury Wizards	8	3	3	0	2	1	17	0.067
5	Wellington Firebirds	8	3	4	0	1	1	15	0.101
6	Northern Knights	8	2	5	0	1	0	10	−0.933

== Fixtures ==
25 November 2011
Report

Wellington Firebirds; 177	v	Auckland Aces; 249
71 Michael Papps; 5/49 Andre Adams		48 Ronnie Hira; 3/38 James Franklin

Auckland won by 72 runs
Bert Sutcliffe Oval
Umpires: Barry Frost and Tim Parlane

25 November 2011
Report

Otago Volts; 295/6	v	Northern Districts; 184
123 Craig Cumming; 2/43 Anton Devcich		72 James Marshall; 5/33 Ian Butler

Otago won by 111 runs
University Oval
Umpires: Gary Baxter and John Ward

25 November 2011
Report

Canterbury Wizards; 268/7	v	Central Districts; 202
78 Tom Latham; 3/48 Michael Mason		60 Mathew Sinclair; 4/24 Matt Henry

Canterbury won by 66 runs
Mainpower Oval
Umpires: Derek Walker and Evan Watkin

4 December 2011
report

Auckland Aces	v	Central Districts

Match abandoned without a ball bowled
Colin Maiden Oval
Umpires: Barry Frost and Wayne Knights

4 December 2011
report

Northern Districts	v	Canterbury Wizards; 267/9
		66 Peter Fulton; 4/44 Brent Arnel

No result
Bay Oval
Umpires: Phil Jones and Derek Walker

4 December 2011
report

Wellington Firebirds; 213	v	Otago Volts; 219
55 Jimmy Neesham; 4/34 Andy McKay		58 James Franklin; 5/44 Jimmy Neesham

Otago won by 6 runs
Basin Reserve
Umpires: Tim Parlane and Evan Watkin

7 December 2011
Report

Canterbury Wizards	v	Otago Volts

Match abandoned without a ball bowled
Mainpower Oval
Umpires: Gary Baxter and Derek Walker

7 December 2011
Report

Central Districts	v	Wellington Firebirds; 205/8
		114 Michael Pollard; 2/42 Kieran Noema-Barnett

No result
Nelson Park
Umpires: Wayne Knights and Evan Watkin

7 December 2011
Report

Northern Districts; 241	v	Auckland Aces; 244/4
83 Hamish Marshall; 3/35 Andre Adams		91 Brad Cachopa; 2/51 Anton Devcich

Auckland won by 6 wickets
Bay Oval
Umpires: Barry Frost and Phil Jones

11 December 2011
Report

Canterbury Wizards; 274	v	Wellington Firebirds; 307/5
57 Tom Latham; 4/63 Andy McKay		103 Grant Elliott; 2/47Andrew Ellis

Wellington won by 33 runs
Aorangi Oval
Umpires: Tim Parlane and Derek Walker

11 December 2011
Report

Northern Districts; 169	v	Central Districts; 170/4
43 Brad Wilson; 3/23 Tarun Nethula		63* Mathew Sinclair; 2/31 Graeme Aldridge

Central Districts won by 6 wickets
Seddon Park
Umpires: Phil Jones and Evan Watkin

11 December 2011
Report

Otago Volts; 302/6	v	Auckland Aces; 303/8
78 Craig Cumming; 2/48 Bhupinder Singh		114 Brad Cachopa; 2/59 Ian Butler, Nick Beard

Auckland won by 2 wickets
University Oval
Umpires: Chris Gaffaney and Wayne Knights

14 December 2011
Report

Central Districts	v	Otago Volts

Match abandoned without a ball bowled
Saxton Oval
Umpires: Barry Frost and Tim Parlane

14 December 2011
Report

Auckland Aces; 239/9	v	Canterbury Wizards; 138/5
55* Gareth Hopkins; 2/20 Matt Henry		102* Brendon Diamanti; 4/79 Michael Bates

Canterbury won by 6 runs (D/L method)
Colin Maiden Oval
Umpires: Chris Gaffaney and Phil Jones

14 December 2011
Report

Wellington Firebirds; 221/6	v	Northern Districts; 327/5
52 Michael Papps; 2/43 Jimmy Baker		110* James Marshall; 3/32 Andy McKay

Northern Districts won by 30 runs (D/L method)
Basin Reserve
Umpires: Gary Baxter and Evan Watkin

26 January 2012
Report

Otago Volts; 34/3	v	Central Districts
17* Mathew Sinclair; 2/18 Neil Wagner

No result
Queen's Park
Umpires: Wayne Knights and Tim Parlane

26 January 2012
Report

Wellington Firebirds; 287	v	Canterbury Wizards; 306/8
122 Stephen Murdoch; 4/63 Ryan McCone		130 Tom Latham; 4/52 Mark Gillespie

Canterbury won by 19 runs
Basin Reserve
Umpires: Chris Gaffaney

26 January 2012
Report

Auckland Aces; 100/2	v	Northern Districts; 99
55* Anaru Kitchen; 2/33 Graeme Aldridge		38 Daryl Mitchell; 5/30 Mitchell McClenaghan

Auckland won by 8 wickets
Colin Maiden Oval
Umpires: Gary Baxter and Evan Watkin

29 January 2012
report

Auckland Aces; 174	v	Wellington Firebirds; 276
48 Jeet Raval; 3/37 Mark Gillespie		90 Michael Papps; 6/41 Mitchell McClenaghan

Wellington won by 102 runs
Colin Maiden Oval
Umpires: Tim Parlane and Wayne Knights

29 January 2012
Report

Northern Districts; 288/8	v	Otago Volts; 293/5
101*Anton Devcich; 3/50 Nick Beard		90 Nathan McCullum; 2/54 Graeme Aldridge

Otago won by 5 runs
Seddon Park
Umpires: Phil Jones and Evan Watkin

29 January 2012
Report

Canterbury Wizards; 291/5	v	Central Districts; 294/3
108 George Worker; 2/46 Adam Milne		130* Dean Robinson; 2/51 Andrew Ellis (cricketer)

Central Districts won by 7 wickets
Mainpower Oval
Umpires: Gary Baxter and Derek Walker

1 February 2012
Report

Canterbury Wizards; 234/9	v	Northern Districts; 238/6
78* Todd Astle; 3/28 Jono Boult		83 Hamish Marshall; 3/44 Matt Henry

Northern Districts won by 4 wickets
Mainpower Oval
Umpires: Tim Parlane and Evan Watkin

1 February 2012
Report

Central Districts; 124/2	v	Auckland Aces; 123
46 Jamie How; 1/10 Colin de Grandhomme		44 Colin Munro; 5/45 Bevan Small

Central Districts won by 8 wickets
Pukekura Park
Umpires: Barry Frost and Derek Walker

1 February 2012
Report

Otago Volts; 251	v	Wellington Firebirds; 276
69 Jimmy Neesham; 5/46 James Franklin		96 Jesse Ryder; 4/30 Neil Wagner

Wellington won by 25 runs
Queen's Park
Umpires: Gary Baxter and Phil Jones

== Preliminary Finals ==
5 February 2012
Report

Central Districts; 16/0	v	Auckland Aces; 230
7* Jamie How, Dean Robinson		66 Colin de Grandhomme; 4/46 Marty Kain

No result
Pukekura Park
Umpires: Tim Parlane and Evan Watkin, 3rd Umpire Phil Jones

5 February 2012
Report

Otago Volts; 172	v	Canterbury Wizards; 160
41 Sam Wells; 3/46 Matt Henry		53 Peter Fulton; 4/23 Jimmy Neesham

Otago won by 12 runs
University Ovals
Umpires: Gary Baxter and Chris Gaffaney

8 February 2012
Report

Auckland Aces; 337/3	v	Otago Volts; 264
117 Neal Parlane; 1/40 Nick Beard		62 Hamish Rutherford; 3/52 Anaru Kitchen

Auckland won by 73 runs
Colin Maiden Oval
Umpires: Barry Frost and Derek Walker

== Final ==
12 February 2012
Report

Central Districts; 285/8	v	Auckland Aces; 282/8
66 Kruger van Wyk; 3/80 Mitchell McClenaghan		106 Neal Parlane; 3/52 Michael Mason

Central Districts won by 2 wickets
Pukekura Park
Umpires: Derek Walker and Evan Watkin

== See also ==
- Ford Trophy
