= English cricket team in New Zealand in 2012–13 =

	New Zealand	England
- Dates: 4 February 2013 – 26 March 2013
Captains	Brendon McCullum	Stuart Broad (T20I); Alastair Cook (Test & ODI)

Test series
- Result: 3-match series drawn 0–0
Most runs	Peter Fulton (347)	Matt Prior (311)
Most wickets	Neil Wagner (12)	Stuart Broad (11)

One Day International series
- Results: England won the 3-match series 2–1
Most runs	Brendon McCullum (222)	Jonathan Trott (171)
Most wickets	Mitchell McClenaghan (4); Tim Southee (4)	James Anderson (7)

Twenty20 International series
- Results: England won the 3-match series 2–1
Most runs	Martin Guptill (150)	Alex Hales (106)
Most wickets	James Franklin (4)	Stuart Broad (7)

The English cricket team toured New Zealand from 4 February to 26 March 2013, their first tour of New Zealand since 2008. The tour consisted of three Twenty20 International matches, three One Day Internationals and three Test matches.

On the fifth day of the 3rd Test, Stuart Broad set a new record for the longest time spent at the crease without scoring a run, with 103 minutes out in the middle. The previous record was 101 minutes, set by New Zealander Geoff Allott against South Africa in 1999.

== Squads ==
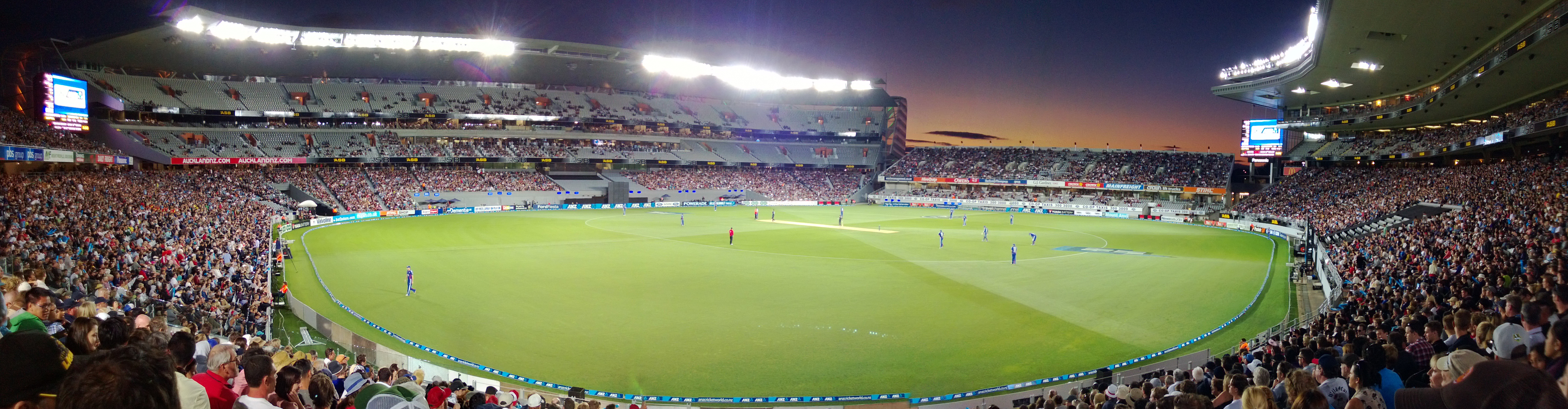
New Zealand v England ODI at Eden Park, Auckland, 9 February 2013

T20Is		ODIs		Tests	
New Zealand	England	New Zealand	England	New Zealand	England
Brendon McCullum (c & wk); Trent Boult; Ian Butler; Grant Elliott; Andrew Ellis; James Franklin; Martin Guptill; Roneel Hira; Mitchell McClenaghan; Nathan McCullum; Colin Munro; Hamish Rutherford; Ross Taylor	Stuart Broad (c); Jonny Bairstow (wk); Jos Buttler (wk); Jade Dernbach; Steven Finn; Alex Hales; Michael Lumb; Stuart Meaker; Eoin Morgan; Samit Patel; Joe Root; James Tredwell; Chris Woakes; Luke Wright	Brendon McCullum (c & wk); Trent Boult; Grant Elliott; Andrew Ellis; James Franklin; Martin Guptill; Mitchell McClenaghan; Nathan McCullum; Kyle Mills; Colin Munro; Ross Taylor; BJ Watling; Kane Williamson	Alastair Cook (c); James Anderson; Jonny Bairstow (wk); Ian Bell; Stuart Broad; Jos Buttler (wk); Steven Finn; James Harris; Eoin Morgan; Samit Patel; Joe Root; Graeme Swann; James Tredwell; Jonathan Trott; Chris Woakes	Brendon McCullum (c & wk); Trent Boult; Doug Bracewell; Dean Brownlie; Peter Fulton; Tom Latham; Bruce Martin; Hamish Rutherford; Tim Southee; Ross Taylor; BJ Watling (wk); Kane Williamson	Alastair Cook (c); James Anderson; Jonny Bairstow (wk); Ian Bell; Stuart Broad; Nick Compton; Steven Finn; Graham Onions; Monty Panesar; Kevin Pietersen; Matt Prior (wk); Joe Root; Graeme Swann; Jonathan Trott; Chris Woakes

== Tour matches ==
=== T20: New Zealand XI v England XI ===
4 February 2013
17:00
Scorecard

New Zealand XI; 70/1 (9.1 overs)	v	England XI
Tom Latham 23* (15); Chris Woakes 1/15 (2 overs)

No result
Cobham Oval, Whangārei
Umpires: Chris Gaffaney (NZ) and Derek Walker (NZ)

- England XI won the toss and elected to field.

=== T20: New Zealand XI v England XI ===
5 February 2013
14:00
Scorecard

England XI; 186/3 (20 overs)	v	New Zealand XI; 140 (19.5 overs)
Jos Buttler 57* (24); Matt Henry 1/28 (4 overs)		Colin Munro 55 (32); Stuart Broad 3/22 (4 overs)

England XI won by 46 runs
Cobham Oval, Whangārei
Umpires: Chris Gaffaney (NZ) and Derek Walker (NZ)

- New Zealand XI won the toss and elected to field.

=== T20: New Zealand XI v England XI ===
6 February 2013
14:00
Scorecard

England XI; 170/5 (20 overs)	v	New Zealand XI; 171/7 (20 overs)
Eoin Morgan 51* (28); Andrew Ellis 2/27 (4 overs)		Tom Latham 64 (38); Stuart Broad 3/24 (4 overs)

New Zealand XI won by 3 wickets
Cobham Oval, Whangārei
Umpires: Chris Gaffaney (NZ) and Derek Walker (NZ)

- New Zealand XI won the toss and elected to field.

=== First-class: New Zealand XI v England XI ===
27 February–2 March 2013
Scorecard

England XI	v	New Zealand XI
426 (103.2 overs); Ian Bell 158 (233); Jimmy Neesham 4/73 (20 overs)		349/7d (95 overs); Hamish Rutherford 90 (149); Graeme Swann 2/56 (19 overs)
256/9d (62 overs); Matt Prior 68 (76); Mark Gillespie 4/87 (16 overs)		334/7 (88.4 overs); BJ Watling 89* (122); Joe Root 2/42 (9 overs)

New Zealand XI won by 3 wickets
Queenstown Events Centre, Queenstown
Umpires: Chris Gaffaney (NZ) and Derek Walker (NZ)

- New Zealand XI won the toss and elected to field.

== T20I series ==
=== 1st T20I ===
9 February 2013
19:00 (D/N)
Scorecard

England; 214/7 (20 overs)	v	New Zealand; 174/9 (20 overs)
Eoin Morgan 46 (26); Andrew Ellis 2/40 (3 overs)		Martin Guptill 44 (32); Stuart Broad 4/24 (4 overs)

England won by 40 runs
Eden Park, Auckland
Umpires: Chris Gaffaney (NZ) and Derek Walker (NZ)

- New Zealand won the toss and elected to field.
- Trent Boult and Hamish Rutherford made their T20I debuts for NZ.

=== 2nd T20I ===
12 February 2013
19:00 (D/N)
Scorecard

New Zealand; 192/6 (20 overs)	v	England; 137 (19.3 overs)
Brendon McCullum 74 (38); Jade Dernbach 3/38 (4 overs)		Jos Buttler 54 (30); James Franklin 4/15 (3.3 overs)

New Zealand won by 55 runs
Seddon Park, Hamilton
Umpires: Gary Baxter (NZ) and Derek Walker (NZ)

- England won the toss and elected to field.

=== 3rd T20I ===
15 February 2013
19:00 (D/N)
Scorecard

New Zealand; 139/8 (20 overs)	v	England; 143/0 (12.4 overs)
Martin Guptill 59 (55); Stuart Broad 3/15 (4 overs)		Alex Hales 80* (42)

England won by 10 wickets
Westpac Stadium, Wellington
Umpires: Gary Baxter (NZ) and Chris Gaffaney (NZ)

- England won the toss and elected to field.

== ODI series ==
=== 1st ODI ===
17 February 2013
14:00 (D/N)
Scorecard

England; 258 (49.3 overs)	v	New Zealand; 259/7 (48.5 overs)
Jonathan Trott 68 (90); Mitchell McClenaghan 4/56 (9.4 overs)		Kane Williamson 74 (99); Chris Woakes 2/52 (10 overs)

New Zealand won by 3 wickets
Seddon Park, Hamilton
Umpires: Gary Baxter (NZ) and S. Ravi (Ind)

- New Zealand won the toss and elected to field.

=== 2nd ODI ===
20 February 2013
14:00 (D/N)
Scorecard

New Zealand; 269 (48.5 overs)	v	England; 270/2 (47.4 overs)
Ross Taylor 100 (117); James Anderson 5/34 (9.5 overs)		Joe Root 79* (56); Kane Williamson 1/39 (8 overs)

England won by 8 wickets
McLean Park, Napier
Umpires: Chris Gaffaney (NZ) and Rod Tucker (Aus)

- England won the toss and elected to field.
- Hamish Rutherford (NZ) made his ODI debut.

=== 3rd ODI ===
23 February 2013
14:00 (D/N)
Scorecard

New Zealand; 185 (43.5 overs)	v	England; 186/5 (37.3 overs)
Brendon McCullum 79 (68); Steven Finn 3/27 (9 overs)		Alastair Cook 46 (67); Tim Southee 3/48 (10 overs)

England won by 5 wickets
Eden Park, Auckland
Umpires: Chris Gaffaney (NZ) and S. Ravi (Ind)

- England won the toss and elected to field.

== Test series ==
=== 1st Test ===
6–10 March 2013
Scorecard

England	v	New Zealand
167 (55 overs); Jonathan Trott 45 (121); Neil Wagner 4/42 (11 overs)		460/9d (116.4 overs); Hamish Rutherford 171 (217); James Anderson 4/137 (33 overs)
421/6 (170 overs); Nick Compton 117 (310); Neil Wagner 3/141 (43 overs)

Match drawn
University Oval, Dunedin
Umpires: Asad Rauf (Pak) and Paul Reiffel (Aus)

- New Zealand won the toss and elected to field.
- No play was possible on Day 1 due to rain and bad light.
- Play on Day 3 was reduced to 66 overs due to rain and bad light.
- Bruce Martin and Hamish Rutherford (both NZ) made their Test debuts.

=== 2nd Test ===
14–18 March 2013
Scorecard

England	v	New Zealand
465 (146.5 overs); Jonathan Trott 121 (235); Bruce Martin 4/130 (48 overs)		254 (89.2 overs); Brendon McCullum 69 (94); Stuart Broad 6/51 (17.2 overs)
		162/2 (f/o) (68 overs); Kane Williamson 55* (174); James Anderson 1/27 (12 overs)

Match drawn
Basin Reserve, Wellington
Umpires: Asad Rauf (Pak) and Rod Tucker (Aus)

- New Zealand won the toss and elected to field.
- Rain on Day 4 reduced play to 35 overs.
- No play was possible on Day 5 due to rain.

=== 3rd Test ===
22–26 March 2013
Scorecard

New Zealand	v	England
443 (152.3 overs); Peter Fulton 136 (346); Steven Finn 6/125 (37.3 overs)		204 (89.2 overs); Matt Prior 73 (130); Trent Boult 6/68 (25 overs)
241/6d (57.2 overs); Peter Fulton 110 (165); Monty Panesar 2/53 (9.2 overs)		315/9 (143 overs); Matt Prior 110 (182); Kane Williamson 4/44 (20 overs)

Match drawn
Eden Park, Auckland
Umpires: Paul Reiffel (Aus) and Rod Tucker (Aus)

- England won the toss and elected to field.

== Statistics ==
=== ODI ===
England

- Joe Root became the first man ever to score 30 or more runs in each of his first six innings when he scored 79* in the 2nd ODI.
- Graeme Swann took his 100th ODI wicket when he caught and bowled James Franklin in the 3rd ODI.

New Zealand

- Ross Taylor scored his 7th ODI century when he scored 100 in the 2nd ODI.

=== Test ===
England

- Jonathan Trott reached 3,000 Test career runs when he scored 45 in the 1st innings of the 1st Test.
- Alastair Cook scored his 24th Test century when he scored 116 in the 2nd innings of the 1st Test.
- Nick Compton scored his first Test century when he scored 117 in the 2nd innings of the 1st Test.
- Nick Compton scored his second Test century when he scored 100 in the 1st innings of the 2nd Test.
- Jonathan Trott scored his ninth Test century when he scored 121 in the 1st innings of the 2nd Test.
- Steven Finn took his fourth five-wicket haul (6/125) in the 1st innings of the 3rd Test.
- Matt Prior scored his seventh Test century when he scored 110 in the 2nd innings of the 3rd Test.

New Zealand

- Bruce Martin took his first Test wicket when he got Matt Prior out in the 1st innings of the 1st Test.
- Hamish Rutherford scored his first Test century (on debut) when he scored 171 in the 1st innings of the 1st Test.
- Peter Fulton scored his first Test century when he scored 136 in the 1st innings of the 3rd Test.
- Trent Boult got his first five-wicket haul when he took six wickets in the 1st innings of the 3rd Test.
- Peter Fulton scored his second Test century when he scored 105 in the 2nd innings of the 3rd Test.
