= English cricket team in New Zealand in 2007–08 =

English cricket team in New Zealand in 2008
	England	New Zealand
- Dates: 2 February 2008 – 26 March 2008
Captains	Michael Vaughan	Daniel Vettori

Test series
- Result: England won the 3-match series 2–1
Most runs	Andrew Strauss 274	Ross Taylor 310
Most wickets	Ryan Sidebottom 24	Chris Martin 11

One Day International series
- Results: New Zealand won the 5-match series 3–1
Most runs	Alastair Cook 184	Brendon McCullum 261
Most wickets	Stuart Broad 8	Daniel Vettori 8

Twenty20 International series
- Results: England won the 2-match series 2–0
Most runs	Paul Collingwood 80	Kyle Mills 41
Most wickets	Ryan Sidebottom 5	Tim Southee 3

The England cricket team toured New Zealand for three Test matches, 5 One-day Internationals, and 2 Twenty20 Internationals between February and March 2008.

== Squads ==
Test squads		ODI squads	
New Zealand	England	New Zealand	England
Daniel Vettori (c)	Michael Vaughan (c)	Daniel Vettori (c)	Paul Collingwood (c)
Brendon McCullum (wk)	Tim Ambrose (wk)	Brendon McCullum (wk)	Phil Mustard (wk)
Matthew Bell	James Anderson	Jesse Ryder	Tim Ambrose
Grant Elliott	Ian Bell	Jamie How	James Anderson
Stephen Fleming	Stuart Broad	Ross Taylor	Ian Bell
Mark Gillespie	Paul Collingwood	Scott Styris	Ravi Bopara
Jamie How	Alastair Cook	Peter Fulton	Stuart Broad
Chris Martin	Steve Harmison	Jacob Oram	Alastair Cook
Kyle Mills	Matthew Hoggard	Kyle Mills	Dimitri Mascarenhas
Iain O'Brien	Phil Mustard	Paul Hitchcock	Kevin Pietersen
Jacob Oram	Monty Panesar	Chris Martin	Owais Shah
Jeetan Patel	Kevin Pietersen	Michael Mason	Ryan Sidebottom
Mathew Sinclair	Owais Shah	Jeetan Patel	Graeme Swann
Ross Taylor	Ryan Sidebottom		James Tredwell
Tim Southee	Andrew Strauss		Chris Tremlett
	Graeme Swann		Luke Wright

== Matches ==
=== Twenty20 Series ===
==== 1st Twenty20 ====
5 February
scorecard

England; 184/8 (20 overs)	v	New Zealand; 152 (19.2 overs)
Kevin Pietersen 43(23); Chris Martin 2/34 (4)		Jacob Oram 61(40); Ryan Sidebottom 3/16 (3.2)

England won by 32 runs
Eden Park, Auckland
Umpires: Gary Baxter (NZ) and Billy Bowden (NZ)
Player of the match: Dimitri Mascarenhas

==== 2nd Twenty20 ====
7 February
scorecard

England; 193/8 (20 overs)	v	New Zealand; 143/8 (20 overs)
Paul Collingwood 54(28); Tim Southee 2/22 (4)		Jamie How 31(25); Ryan Sidebottom 2/19 (4)

England won by 50 runs
Jade Stadium, Christchurch
Umpires: Gary Baxter (NZ) and Billy Bowden (NZ)
Player of the match: Paul Collingwood

=== ODI Series ===
==== 1st ODI ====
9 February
scorecard

England; 130 (49.4)	v	New Zealand; 131/4 (30)
Phil Mustard 31(60); Jeetan Patel 2/14 (6.4)		Brendon McCullum 42(42); Stuart Broad 3/26 (9)

New Zealand won by 6 wickets
Westpac Stadium, Wellington
Umpires: Asad Rauf (PAK) and Garry Baxter (NZ)
Player of the match: Scott Styris (NZ)

==== 2nd ODI ====
12 February
scorecard

England; 158 (35.1 overs)	v	New Zealand; 165/0 (18.1 overs)
Alastair Cook 53 (69); Daniel Vettori 2/16 (6.1 overs)		Brendon McCullum 80* (47)

New Zealand won by 10 wickets (D/L method)
Seddon Park, Hamilton, New Zealand
Umpires: Asad Rauf (Pak) and Gary Baxter (NZ)
Player of the match: Jesse Ryder (NZ)

- Rain reduced play to 36 overs after stoppage during first innings. D/L method set the target at 165.

==== 3rd ODI ====
15 February
scorecard

England; 229/4 (44 overs)	v	New Zealand; 234/9 (50 overs)
Ian Bell 73 (89); Daniel Vettori 2/23 (10 overs)		Jacob Oram 88 (91); Stuart Broad 3/32 (10 overs)

England won by 6 wickets (D/L Method)
Eden Park, Auckland
Umpires: Asad Rauf, Gary Baxter
Player of the match: Paul Collingwood

==== 4th ODI ====
20 February
scorecard

England; 340/6 (50 overs)	v	New Zealand; 340/7 (50 overs)
Phil Mustard 83 (74); Jesse Ryder 2/14 (3 overs)		Jamie How 139 (116); Stuart Broad 2/75 (10 overs)

Match tied
McLean Park
Umpires: Asad Rauf, Billy Bowden
Player of the match: Jamie How

==== 5th ODI ====
23 February
scorecard

England; 242/7 (50 overs)	v	New Zealand; 213/6 (37 overs)
Wright 47 (40); Mills 4/36 (10 overs)		McCullum 77 (43); Sidebottom 3/51 (10 overs)

New Zealand won by 34 runs (D/L Method)
Jade Stadium, Christchurch
Umpires: Rauf, Bowden
Player of the match: Brendon McCullum

=== Test Series ===
==== 1st Test ====
5–9 March
Scorecard

New Zealand	v	England
470 (138.3 overs); Ross Taylor 120 (235); Ryan Sidebottom 4/90 (34.3 overs)		348 (173.1 overs); Paul Collingwood 66 (182); Jeetan Patel 3/107 (43 overs)
177/9 (dec) (48 overs); Stephen Fleming 66 (88); Ryan Sidebottom 5/37 (14 overs)		110 (55 overs); Ian Bell 54* (151); Kyle Mills 4/16 (13 overs)

New Zealand won by 189 runs
Seddon Park, Hamilton
Umpires: Steve Davis & Daryl Harper (both AUS)
Player of the match: Kyle Mills

- Ryan Sidebottom takes a Test hat-trick.

==== 2nd Test ====
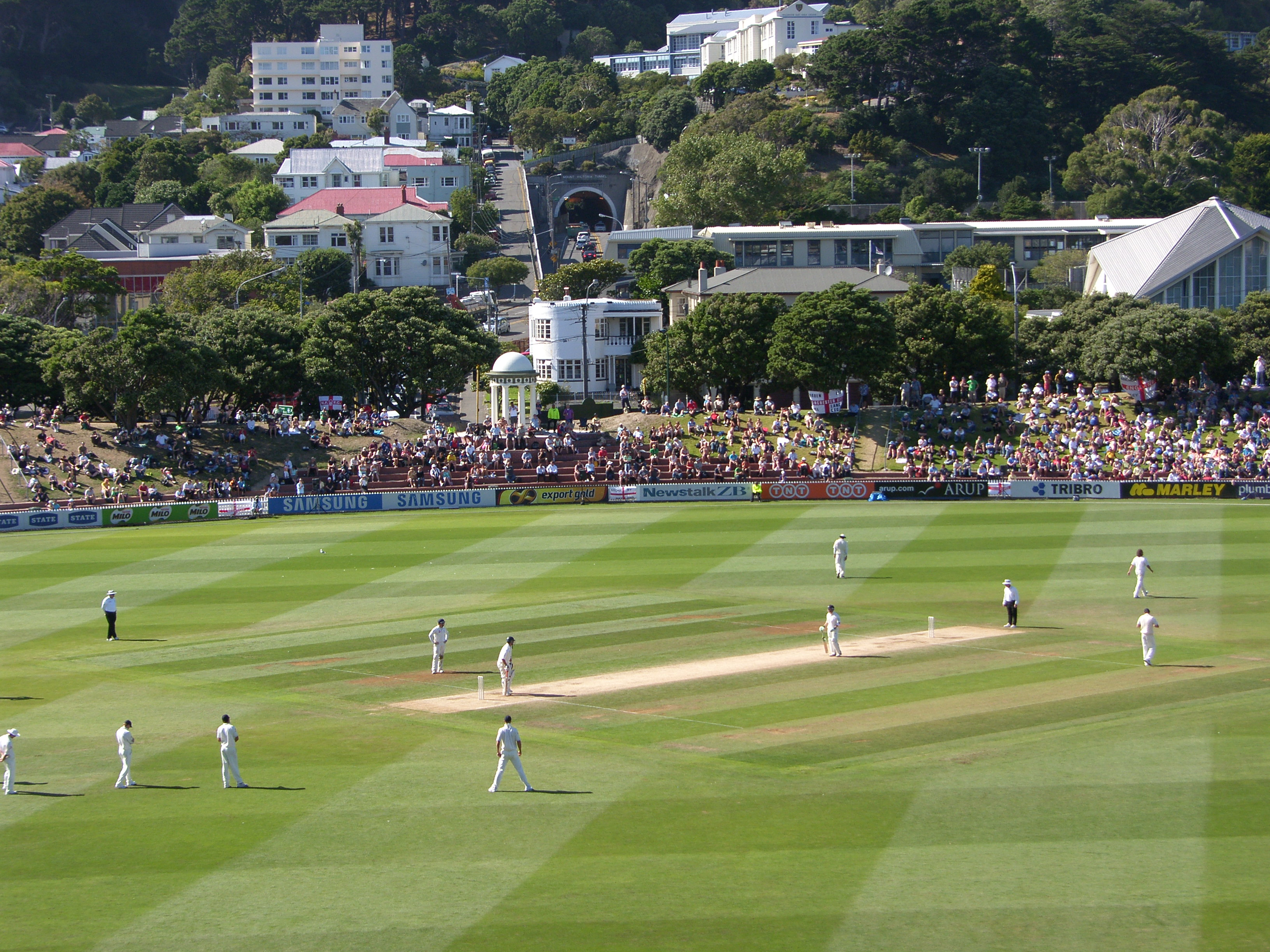
The England cricket team fielding in the second test

13–17 March
scorecard

England	v	New Zealand
342 (107 overs); Tim Ambrose 102 (149); Mark Gillespie 4/79 (20 overs)		198 (57.5 overs); Ross Taylor 53 (94); James Anderson 5/73 (20 overs)
293 (97.4 overs); Alastair Cook 60 (137); Jacob Oram 3/44 (20 overs)		311 (100.3 overs); Brendon McCullum 85 (116); Ryan Sidebottom 5/105 (31 overs)

England won by 126 runs
Basin Reserve, Wellington
Umpires: Steve Davis (AUS) & Rudi Koertzen (RSA)
Player of the match: Tim Ambrose

==== 3rd Test ====
22–26 March
(scorecard)

England	v	New Zealand
253 (96.1 overs); Kevin Pietersen 129 (208); Tim Southee 5/55 (23.1 overs)		168 (48.4 overs); Stephen Fleming 59 (72); Ryan Sidebottom 7/47 (21.4 overs)
467/7(dec) (131.5 overs); Andrew Strauss 177 (343); Daniel Vettori 4/158 (45 overs)		431 (118.5 overs); Tim Southee 77* (40); Monty Panesar 6/126 (46 overs)

England win by 121 runs
McLean Park, Napier
Umpires: Daryl Harper (AUS) & Rudi Koertzen (RSA)
Player of the match: Ryan Sidebottom

- Tim Southee and Grant Elliott (NZ) both made their Test debuts.

=== Tour Matches ===
==== Canterbury vs. England XI-2 February ====
2 February
scorecard

England; 295/6 (50 overs)	v	(New Zealand) Canterbury; 261/11 (50 overs)
Ian Bell 79 (89); Todd Astle 2/52 (9 overs)		Johann Myburgh 87 (98); James Anderson 5/47 (10 overs)

England XI win by 34 runs
Village Green, Christchurch, New Zealand
Umpires: Billy Bowden & Tony Hill

- 13 players per side (11 batting, 11 fielding)

==== Canterbury vs. England XI-3 February ====
3 February
(scorecard)

(New Zealand) Canterbury; 218/9 (50 overs)	v	England; 220/3 (42.5 overs)
Michael Papps 89 (128); Paul Collingwood 3/25 (5 overs)		Alastair Cook 138* (140); Todd Astle 1/30 (5 overs)

England XI win by 7 wickets
village green, Christchurch, New Zealand
Umpires: Gary Baxter & Tony Hill

- Players per side: Canterbury 13 (11 batting, 11 fielding); England XI 12 (11 batting, 11 fielding)

==== New Zealand Selection XI vs. England XI ====
25–26 February
(scorecard)

England	v	New Zealand Selection XI
369/9 (dec) (90 overs); Owais Shah 96 (150); William Somerville 3/73 (20 overs)		146/10 (50.4 overs); Jordan Sheed 47 (103); James Anderson 3/31 (8 overs)
		102/3 (32 overs) (f/o); Peter Fulton 33 (46); Monty Panesar 2/15 (8 overs)

Match Drawn
University Oval, Dunedin, New Zealand
Umpires: Dave Quested & Derek Walker (both NZL)

- Players per side: 14 (11 batting, 11 fielding)

==== New Zealand Selection XI vs. England XI ====
28 February – 1 March
(scorecard)

England	v	New Zealand Selection XI
131/10 (40.1 overs); Kevin Pietersen 50 (72); Iain O'Brien 4/34 (12 overs)		271/10 (76.2 overs); Jamie How 65 (89); Steve Harmison 5/100 (22 overs)
325/7 (89 overs); Andrew Strauss 104(retired out) (186); Ian Bell 104* (151); Mark Gillespie 2/74 (17 overs)

Match Drawn
University Oval, Dunedin, New Zealand
Umpires: Barry Frost & Phil Jones (both NZL)
