= Cachopa =

Cachopa is a surname. Notable people with the surname include:

- Bradley Cachopa (born 1988), New Zealand cricketer
- Carl Cachopa (born 1986), New Zealand cricketer
- Craig Cachopa (born 1992), New Zealand cricketer
