= Blair Soper =

New Zealand cricketer (born 1991)

Personal information
- Full name: Blaire Early Soper
- Born: 26 October 1991 (age 35); Dunedin, Otago, New Zealand
- Batting: Right-handed
- Bowling: Left-arm fast
- Role: Bowler

Domestic team information
- Years: Team
- 2012/13–2018/19: Otago
- Source: Cricinfo, 8 February 2016

Blair Earle Soper (born 26 October 1991) is a New Zealand cricketer who has played for Otago in top-level matches.

Soper was born at Dunedin in 1991 and grew up in Southland before moving to Dunedin as a child due to his father, Ewan's, work. He was educated at Otago Boys' High School. His uncle, Grant Soper, played Hawke Cup cricket for Southland and Soper played age-group cricket for Otago and in 2009 featured in a trial match for selection for the national under-19 side before being selected in the preliminary New Zealand squad for the 2010 Under-19 Cricket World Cup. As well as cricket, Soper represented Otago age-group sides in field hockey.

Soper made his first-class debut on 12 November 2012 in the 2015–16 Plunket Shield. After playing in four Plunket Shield matches during the season and taking 12 wickets, including a five-wicket haul against Wellington, the "promising up-and-comer" was awarded a contract with Otago in July for the following season. He established himself as a regular in Otago's Shield side, playing in the team's first six matches of the season, before a shoulder injury meant he was unable to play.

The injury required surgery and Soper lost his place in the side. He played in one Shield match towards the end of the 2015–16 season but only bowled 7.3 overs before suffering another injury. He returned to the side in November 2019 and played in two List A matches, making his debut on 21 November 2019 against Wellington in the 2019–20 Ford Trophy, replacing the injured Michael Rae. He took a wicket in the first over of the Wellington innings, his only List A wicket.

Soper has played club cricket for Green island Cricket Club. Whilst out of the Otago side he studied an automotive course at Otago Polytechnic and works as a mechanic.
