= James Fuller (cricketer, born 1990) =

New Zealand cricketer

Personal information
- Full name: James Kerr Fuller
- Born: 24 January 1990 (age 36); Cape Town, Cape Province, South Africa
- Batting: Right-handed
- Bowling: Right-arm fast
- Role: All-rounder

Domestic team information
- Years: Team
- 2009/10–2012/13: Otago
- 2011–2015: Gloucestershire (squad no. 26)
- 2013/14–2015/16: Auckland
- 2016–2018: Middlesex (squad no. 26)
- 2019–present: Hampshire (squad no. 26)
- 2022–2023: Southern Brave
- 2022: Jaffna Kings
- 2023: Sunrisers Eastern Cape
- 2023: Karachi Kings
- 2024–present: Fortune Barishal
- 2024: Birmingham Phoenix
- FC debut: 20 March 2010 Otago v Northern Districts
- LA debut: 24 April 2011 Gloucestershire v Glamorgan

Career statistics
| Competition | FC | LA | T20 |
|---|---|---|---|
| Matches | 113 | 76 | 230 |
| Runs scored | 3,124 | 1,079 | 2,143 |
| Batting average | 22.47 | 25.09 | 20.02 |
| 100s/50s | 0/12 | 0/4 | 0/3 |
| Top score | 93 | 58* | 57 |
| Balls bowled | 14,711 | 2,968 | 3,558 |
| Wickets | 275 | 91 | 201 |
| Bowling average | 32.91 | 32.52 | 26.11 |
| 5 wickets in innings | 9 | 1 | 1 |
| 10 wickets in match | 1 | 0 | 0 |
| Best bowling | 6/24 | 6/35 | 6/28 |
| Catches/stumpings | 40/– | 26/– | 90/– |
- Source: Cricinfo, 26 September 2026

James Kerr Fuller (born 24 January 1990) is a South African born New Zealand professional cricketer, who has also played for the England Lions cricket team. Having played for Otago and Auckland in New Zealand domestic cricket, Fuller played for Gloucestershire (2011–2015) and Middlesex (2016–2018). He signed a two-year contract with Hampshire on 4 October 2018.

== Cricket career ==
A right-arm fast bowler who played in the New Zealand U-19 cricket team, Fuller made his first-class cricket debut for Otago in March 2010. He moved to England in 2011, to play for Gloucestershire after signing a three-year contract in August 2010 as a British passport holder. Although he was offered another deal at Gloucestershire, he moved to Middlesex at the end of the 2015 season.

In the quarter final of the 2012 Friends Life t20 tournament against Sussex, Fuller conceded 38 runs from one over, to fellow New Zealander Scott Styris. On 20 January 2013, Fuller took 4/24 for Otago to win the 2012–13 HRV Cup 2012/13 against Wellington Firebirds. Less than a week later, he inflicted similar destruction upon Wellington, this time in the Plunket Shield, he took 4/55 in the first innings followed by 6/24 in the second as Otago won by an innings and 290 runs. In July 2013 he took a first-class hat-trick for Gloucestershire v Worcestershire at Cheltenham, removing 3 top order batsmen. He was overjoyed to do it in the presence of his family visiting from New Zealand. In August 2013, Fuller signed a new two-year contract after a very successful 2013.

In October 2013, Fuller signed for Auckland Aces in New Zealand, to play for the entire duration of the HRV Twenty20 Cup. In August 2020, in the third round of matches in the 2020 Bob Willis Trophy, Fuller took a hat-trick.
