= Matt Quinn =

English-New Zealand cricketer (born 1993)

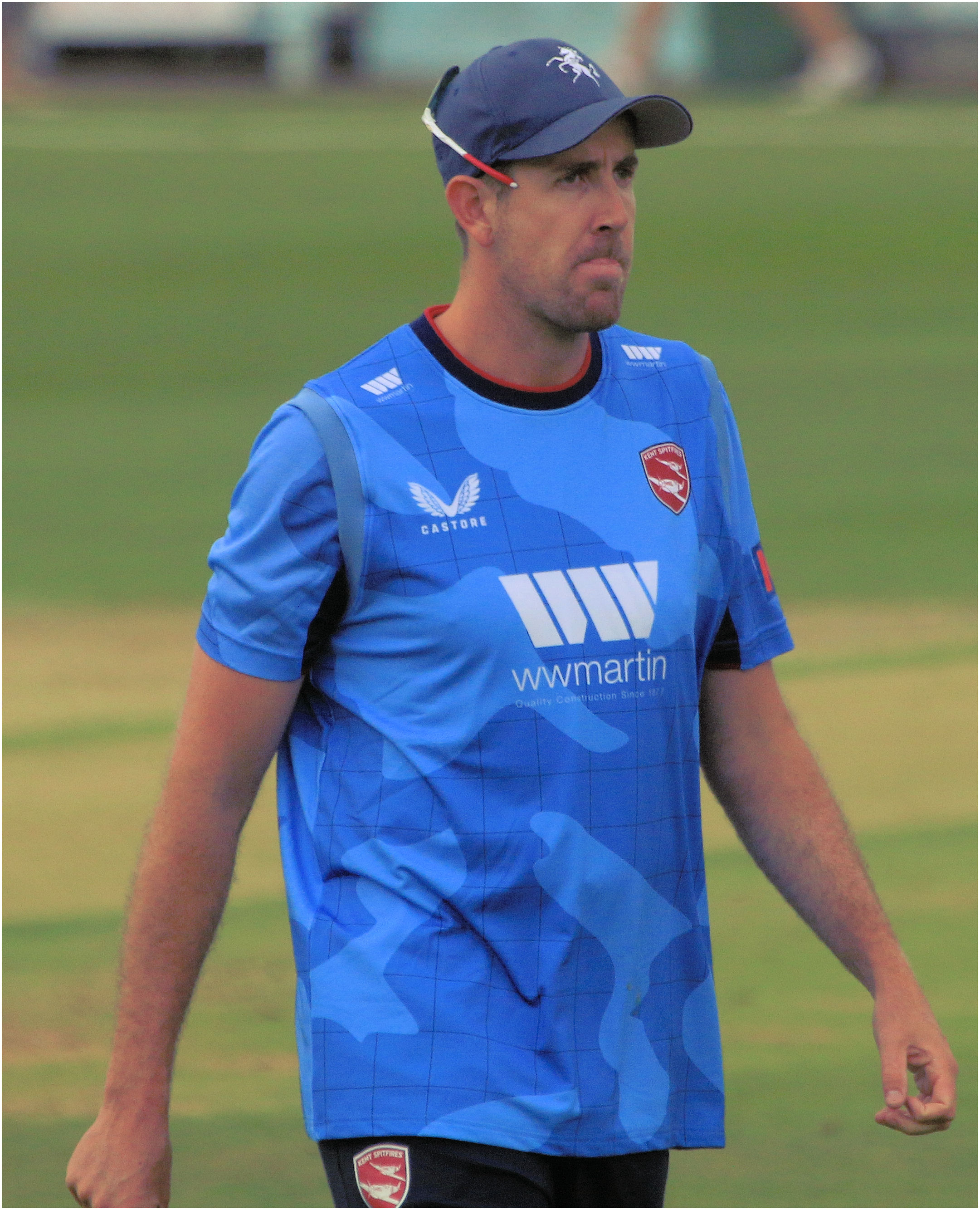
- Quinn in 2023

Personal information
- Full name: Matthew Richard Quinn
- Born: 28 February 1993 (age 33); Auckland, New Zealand
- Batting: Right-handed
- Bowling: Right-arm medium-fast
- Role: Bowler

Domestic team information
- Years: Team
- 2012/13–2018/19: Auckland
- 2016–2020: Essex (squad no. 94)
- 2021: → Kent (loan) (squad no. 64)
- 2022–: Kent
- FC debut: 30 January 2013 Auckland v Central Districts
- LA debut: 26 February 2013 Auckland v Canterbury

Career statistics
Competition	FC	LA	T20
Matches	68	50	74
Runs scored	691	166	29
Batting average	10.63	11.85	14.50
100s/50s	0/1	0/0	0/0
Top score	50	36	8*
Balls bowled	11,796	2,330	1,458
Wickets	210	62	75
Bowling average	29.33	39.24	28.66
5 wickets in innings	2	0	0
10 wickets in match	1	0	0
Best bowling	7/76	4/71	4/20
Catches/stumpings	14/–	9/–	14/–
- Source: Cricinfo, 27 September 2026

Matthew Richard Quinn (born 28 February 1993) is a New Zealand born cricketer who plays for Kent County Cricket Club.

Quinn was born in New Zealand and played for Auckland, making his List A cricket debut in February 2013 in the 2012–13 Ford Trophy. At the end of 2015, he signed a three-year contract with Essex County Cricket Club. Quinn has a British passport so is not regarded as an overseas player. On 5 May 2021, Quinn joined Kent County Cricket Club on loan for their next four matches in the 2021 County Championship. On 16 June 2021, Quinn signed a three-year contract with Kent to start from 2022 and also rejoined on loan for the remainder of the 2021 season. He signed a one-year contract extension with the club in October 2024. Quinn agreed a contract extension tying him into the club until at least the end of the 2027 season in December 2025.
