= Ben McCord =

New Zealand cricketer (born 1987)

Personal information
- Full name: Benjiman Eric William McCord
- Born: 17 August 1987 (age 39); Timaru, New Zealand
- Batting: Right-handed
- Bowling: Right-arm medium-fast
- Role: Bowler

Domestic team information
- Years: Team
- 2013–2015: Canterbury

Career statistics
Competition	FC	T20
Matches	5	1
Runs scored	103	–
Batting average	14.71	–
100s/50s	-/-	-/-
Top score	47	–
Balls bowled	785	24
Wickets	16	1
Bowling average	27.75	31.00
5 wickets in innings	0	0
10 wickets in match	0	n/a
Best bowling	3/35	1/31
Catches/stumpings	3/-	1/-
- Source: ESPNcricinfo, 30 October 2017

Benjiman Eric William McCord (born 17 August 1987) is a New Zealand cricketer. He has previously represented Canterbury, playing as a pace bowler.
