= James McMillan (cricketer) =

New Zealand cricketer (born 1978)

James Michael McMillan (born 14 June 1978) is a New Zealand former professional cricketer. He played for Otago between the 2000–01 and 2014–15 seasons.

McMillan was born at Christchurch in 1978 and is the cousin of former New Zealand international cricketer Craig McMillan. He played age-group cricket for Otago before making is senior representative debut for the team during the 2000–01 season. He was a member of the New Zealand Academy team and played for a variety of national representative teams without being selected for the senior international team.

A right-arm fast bowler, McMillan played in 150 top-level matches for Otago in a career that lasted until the end of the 2014–15 season. He took 239 wickets for the senior team, 130 in first-class matches, with best bowling figures of seven wickets taken against Canterbury during the 2006–07 season. He was considered one of the fastest bowlers in New Zealand cricket but suffered from a range of injuries throughout his career. Towards the end of his professional career McMillan began studying for an occupational therapy degree at Otago Polytechnic, going on to work in the industry in Dunedin.
