= Mark Houghton =

New Zealand cricketer (born 1984)

Mark Vincent Houghton (born 3 November 1984 in Upper Hutt, Wellington) is a New Zealand cricketer who plays for the Wellington Firebirds. He is also co-owner of Buzz Bats with Grant Elliott and Luke Woodcock.
