= Tipene Friday =

New Zealand cricketer

Personal information
- Born: 24 October 1990 (age 36) Wellington, New Zealand
- Listed height: 198 cm (6 ft 6 in)

Career information
- High school: St. Patrick's College (Wellington, New Zealand)
- Playing career: 2016–present
- Position: Forward

Career history
- 2016–2018: Super City Rangers

Sven Eru Tipene Friday (born 24 October 1990) is a New Zealand professional basketball player and former first-class cricketer.

== Early sporting career ==
Friday grew up playing rugby and cricket, as well as basketball in high school. He represented Wellington in cricket through the age-groups, and before he started playing basketball, he was named to the U17 national tournament team in 2007. Friday began playing basketball in early 2007, and by June 2009, he had been a part of three national championship teams, won back-to-back AA secondary schools titles with St. Patrick's College, and won another with Porirua at the BBNZ U21 Championships in 2008. He later played for the Junior Tall Blacks in July 2009 at the FIBA Under-19 World Championship and spent the 2009 New Zealand NBL season on the Wellington Saints training squad list. He also played for a Porirua squad that finished runners-up in the 2009 Open National Championships. He subsequently earned all-tournament team honours.

Friday took up cricket again in 2010 and went on to play first-class cricket for Wellington, Auckland and Otago.

== Professional basketball career ==
In March 2016, Friday joined the Super City Rangers for the 2016 New Zealand NBL season. After recovering from a back injury, Friday was meant to return to cricket in the English domestic league. To maintain his fitness, he began attending practice sessions with the Rangers and coach Jeff Green brought him on board. He appeared in 14 games for the Rangers in 2016. In October of that year, Friday joined Mexicali Fresh Summer Jam team "The Birdmen". Friday continued on with the Super City Rangers in 2017 and 2018.
