= Harry Boam =

New Zealand cricketer (born 1990)

Personal information
- Full name: Harry Kenneth Perrott Boam
- Born: 15 October 1990 (age 36); Birmingham, England
- Batting: Right-handed
- Bowling: Right-arm medium
- Role: All-rounder

Domestic team information
- Years: Team
- 2008/09–2012/13: Wellington

Career statistics
Competition	FC	LA	T20
Matches	27	30	27
Runs scored	1,170	732	123
Batting average	35.45	38.52	15.37
100s/50s	2/5	0/3	0/0
Top score	102	98*	47
Balls bowled	2,545	822	162
Wickets	33	16	7
Bowling average	36.69	49.62	33.57
5 wickets in innings	1	0	0
10 wickets in match	0	0	0
Best bowling	6/51	2/26	2/16
Catches/stumpings	20/–	28/–	11/–
- Source: CricketArchive, 5 October 2024

Harry Kenneth Perrott Boam (born 15 October 1990) is a New Zealand former cricketer. He was the first schoolboy to play representative top-level cricket for Wellington. He represented New Zealand at the Under 19 Cricket World Cup in Malaysia and on the team's tour of England in 2008. Captain of the Wellington College 1st XI team he was award of Wellington Sport's Sportsman of the Year award for 2008.
