= Carl Cachopa =

New Zealand cricketer (born 1986)

Personal information
- Full name: Carl Cachopa
- Born: 17 May 1986 (age 40); Bloemfontein, Orange Free State, South Africa
- Batting: Right-handed
- Bowling: Right-arm medium
- Role: Batting all-rounder
- Relatives: Brad Cachopa (brother); Craig Cachopa (brother)

Domestic team information
- Years: Team
- 2004/05–2009/10: Auckland
- 2010/11–2013/14: Central Districts
- 2014/15: Auckland

Career statistics
Competition	FC	LA	T20
Matches	54	32	26
Runs scored	2,688	464	405
Batting average	31.62	17.18	25.31
100s/50s	7/11	0/4	0/2
Top score	179*	93	69
Balls bowled	2,139	301	60
Wickets	37	7	3
Bowling average	32.43	43.14	30.00
5 wickets in innings	0	0	0
10 wickets in match	0	0	0
Best bowling	3/15	3/35	1/12
Catches/stumpings	22/–	9/–	5/–
- Source: CricketArchive, 10 May 2022

Carl Cachopa (born 17 May 1986) is a South African-born New Zealand cricketer who plays domestically for Auckland (and previously also for Central Districts). He was born in Bloemfontein, in what is now South Africa's Free State province, and represented the Free State cricket team at under-15 level. His family emigrated to New Zealand in 2002, and he and two younger brothers, Brad (born 1988) and Craig Cachopa (born 1992), have each since played first-class cricket in New Zealand. A right-handed batsman who also bowls occasional right-arm medium pace, Carl Cachopa debuted for the Auckland under-19s at the age of 16, during the 2002–03 National Under-19 Tournament, and made his senior debut late in the 2004–05 season of the State Championship, aged 18. The following season, when the West Indies toured, he was used as a substitute fielder during the first Test, and took a catch off the bowling of Shane Bond to dismiss Brian Lara.

After the 2006–07 season, Cachopa left New Zealand to play grade cricket in South Australia, which precipitated a single appearance for the state's second XI in the Cricket Australia Cup. He returned to New Zealand for the 2010–11 season, signing with Central Districts. Good form during the 2012–13 Plunket Shield season, including a career-high 179 not out against Auckland, led to Cachopa's selection for New Zealand A on a tour of India in August and September 2013, which included matches against India A and Sri Lanka A. Cachopa returned to Auckland for the 2014–15 season, and will play alongside his younger brother, Brad, a wicket-keeper who switched from Canterbury. He is of Portuguese descent.
