= Bradley Cachopa =

New Zealand cricketer (born 1988)

Brad Cachopa
Personal information
- Full name: Bradley Cachopa
- Born: 8 August 1988 (age 38); Bloemfontein, Orange Free State, South Africa
- Batting: Right-handed
- Role: Wicket-keeper/batsman
- Relatives: Carl Cachopa (brother); Craig Cachopa (brother)

Domestic team information
- Years: Team
- 2010/11–2011/12: Auckland
- 2012/13–2013/14: Canterbury
- 2014/15–2016/17: Auckland

Career statistics
Competition	FC	LA	T20
Matches	58	39	47
Runs scored	2,830	1,242	628
Batting average	32.52	33.56	21.65
100s/50s	3/13	3/4	0/2
Top score	135*	126	67*
Balls bowled	4	–	–
Wickets	2	–	–
Bowling average	1.00	–	–
5 wickets in innings	0	–	–
10 wickets in match	0	–	–
Best bowling	2/2	–	–
Catches/stumpings	137/7	39/1	18/5
- Source: CricketArchive, 10 May 2022

Bradley Cachopa (born 8 August 1988) is a South African-born New Zealand cricketer who plays domestically for Auckland (and previously also for Canterbury). He is of Portuguese descent.

== Biography ==
He was born in Bloemfontein, in what is now South Africa's Free State province, and represented the Free State cricket team at under-13 level. His family emigrated to New Zealand in 2002, and he and two brothers, Carl (born 1986) and Craig Cachopa (born 1992), have each since played first-class cricket in New Zealand. A right-handed batsman and occasional wicket-keeper, Brad Cachopa represented the New Zealand under-19s when the Indian under-19s toured during the 2006–07 season, playing three under-19 Tests and three under-19 ODIs. He made his first-class debut for Auckland during the 2010–11 season of the Plunket Shield, also featuring in that season's HRV Cup, New Zealand's domestic Twenty20 competition. Cachopa switched to Canterbury for the 2012–13 season, but returned to Auckland prior to the 2014–15 season, after two seasons at Canterbury. His older brother, Carl, also signed with Auckland, having previously played for Central Districts.
