= Colin Munro =

New Zealand cricketer (born 1987)

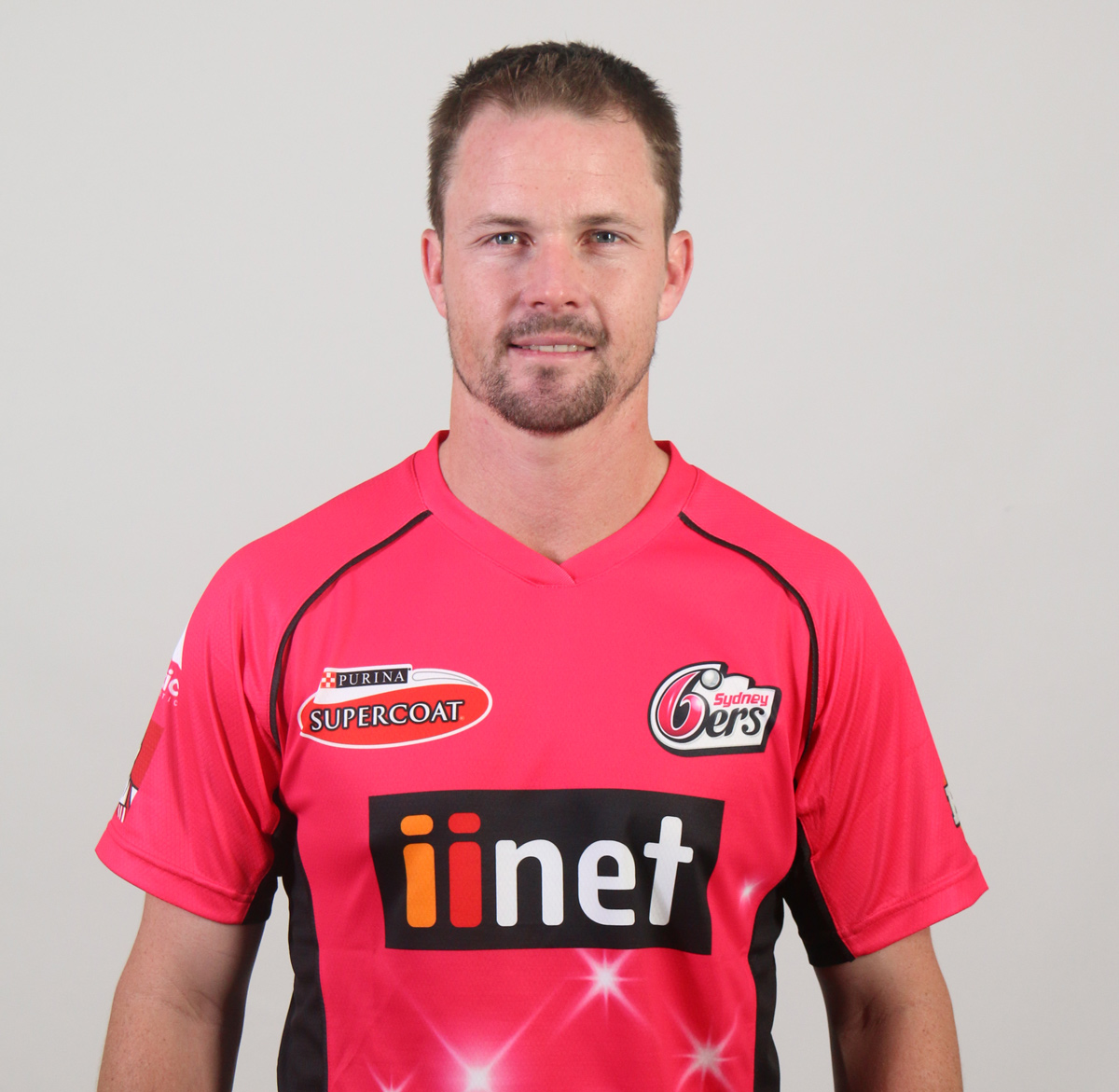
- Munro with the Sydney Sixers in 2017

Personal information
- Born: 11 March 1987 (age 39); Durban, Natal Province, South Africa
- Height: 1.80 m (5 ft 11 in)
- Batting: Left-handed
- Bowling: Right-arm medium fast
- Role: Opening batter

International information
- National side: New Zealand (2012–2020)
- Only Test (cap 258): 11 January 2013 v South Africa
- ODI debut (cap 179): 22 January 2013 v South Africa
- Last ODI: 26 June 2019 v Pakistan
- ODI shirt no.: 82
- T20I debut (cap 58): 21 December 2012 v South Africa
- Last T20I: 2 February 2020 v India
- T20I shirt no.: 82

Domestic team information
- Years: Team
- 2006/07–2020/21: Auckland
- 2014–2015, 2022: Worcestershire
- 2016: Kolkata Knight Riders
- 2016–present: Trinbago Knight Riders
- 2016/17: Sydney Sixers
- 2018–2019: Delhi Capitals
- 2018: Hampshire
- 2019: Karachi Kings
- 2020–2025: Islamabad United
- 2020/21–2021/22: Perth Scorchers
- 2021: Manchester Originals
- 2022–2023: Trent Rockets
- 2022/23–present: Brisbane Heat
- 2023: Nottinghamshire
- 2023: St Lucia Kings
- 2026–: Rotterdam Dockers

Career statistics
Competition	Test	ODI	T20I	FC
Matches	1	57	65	48
Runs scored	15	1,271	1,724	3,611
Batting average	7.5	24.92	31.34	51.58
100s/50s	0/0	0/8	3/11	13/15
Top score	15	87	109*	281
Balls bowled	108	552	118	3,518
Wickets	2	7	4	58
Bowling average	20.0	68.71	46.50	27.51
5 wickets in innings	0	0	0	0
10 wickets in match	0	0	0	0
Best bowling	2/40	2/10	1/12	4/36
Catches/stumpings	0/–	22/–	19/–	21/–
Medal record
Men's Cricket
Representing New Zealand
ICC Cricket World Cup
Runner-up	2019 England and Wales
- Source: ESPNcricinfo, 15 September 2026

Colin Munro (born 11 March 1987) is a South African born former New Zealand international cricketer, who played for New Zealand cricket team. He was a member of the New Zealand Under-19 team and is currently a member of the Auckland cricket team. He was a part of the New Zealand squad to finish as runners-up at the 2019 Cricket World Cup.

== Early life ==
Munro was born the youngest of 4 boys, in early spring, 1987, with three older brothers. He attended Maidstone Primary School in Tongaat and after moving to New Zealand, attended Pakuranga College and played in the school's 1st XI cricket team. Munro represented New Zealand in the Under-19 Cricket World Cup held in Sri Lanka in 2006.

== Domestic and T20 franchise career ==
In 2012-13, he and Craig Cachopa added 377 runs for the sixth wicket against the Wellington Firebirds in the Plunket Shield, falling two runs shy of the sixth wicket partnership record. He scored the second highest score for the Auckland Aces of 269 unbeaten with 27 fours and 14 sixes behind Bill Carson's record score of 290 set back in 1936/37.

In January 2017, Munro signed for the Sydney Sixers in the Big Bash League and made his debut in front of 39,756 at the SCG against the Thunder.

In March, 2018, as his international form in T20 not translating in ODIs, and with the 2019 Cricket World Cup looming, Munro decided to forego the rest of the 2017/18 and 2018/2019 Plunket Shield test seasons and focuses solely on white ball cricket. This also includes international Test cricket.

In September 2018, he was named in Balkh's squad in the first edition of the Afghanistan Premier League tournament. In June 2019, he was selected to play for the Brampton Wolves franchise team in the 2019 Global T20 Canada tournament. He was released by the Delhi Capitals ahead of the 2020 IPL auction. Ahead of the 2020 PSL Draft, he was released by Karachi Kings. In December 2019, he was drafted by Islamabad United as first pick of the Diamond Category round at the 2020 PSL draft.

In June 2020, he was offered a contract by Auckland ahead of the 2020–21 domestic cricket season. In July 2020, he was named in the Trinbago Knight Riders squad for the 2020 Caribbean Premier League. He was signed by Manchester Originals for The Hundred 2021 tournament.

In December 2021, he was signed by Islamabad United following the players' draft for the 2022 Pakistan Super League. He was part of Perth Scorchers for the 2021–22 Big Bash League season but on 9 January 2022, he was tested positive for COVID-19.

In April 2022, he was bought by the Trent Rockets for the 2022 season of The Hundred in England.

== International career ==
He was selected for the New Zealand Test Cricket team to play South Africa in the 2nd Test of the NZ team's tour after an injury to James Franklin. This made him New Zealand Test Cricketer number 258. In 2016, after becoming the top scorer in the domestic T20 competition, where he bats at no.3, there were hopes for him to cement that spot before the ICC World T20, given Brendon McCullum's international retirement before the tournament.

Munro was added to the series against Sri Lanka, after a great domestic season. He played the last ODI and 2 T20Is in the series. In the second T20I at Eden Park, Munro recorded the second fastest T20I fifty of all time in 14 balls, with seven sixes, only behind 12-ball fifty of Yuvraj Singh. This is also the fastest fifty by a New Zealander in this format, beating the previous record set by Martin Guptill (50 from 19 balls) just 20 minutes before. He was adjudged man of the match for this performance.

On 6 January 2017 against Bangladesh, Munro scored his first Twenty20 International century, and became the third player for New Zealand to score a T20I hundred after Brendon McCullum and Martin Guptill. With his century, New Zealand posted 195 runs in 20 overs and finally won the match by 47 runs.

Munro was lifted to opening batting position during the ODI series against India, and he had good fortunes in the opening slot in a few matches.

On 4 November 2017, in the second T20I of the Indian tour, Munro scored his second Twenty20 International century, becoming the second New Zealander (after McCullum) and fourth overall to score two T20I centuries. He was also the first batsman to score two T20I centuries in a year. New Zealand won the match by 40 runs and 3-match series was levelled 1–1 with his all-round contribution.

During the series against West Indies, Munro moved up to open in the limited overs formats. On 3 January 2018, during the series against the West Indies, he became the first player to score three centuries in T20I cricket. With this feat, he became the no.1 T20I batsman in the world, while Ish Sodhi claimed the no.1 T20I bowler ranking at the same time, making them the first Black Caps pair to top the respective lists since Brendon McCullum and Daniel Vettori in 2008 and 2009.

In May 2018, he was one of twenty players to be awarded a new contract for the 2018–19 season by New Zealand Cricket.

Munro experienced indifferent form opening in ODIs against the Indian cricket team in New Zealand in 2018-19 but had more success in the T20s and was Player Of The Match in the 3rd match with a rapid 72. His form reflected that of the NZ team.

In March 2019, he was named as the ANZ International Men's T20 Player of the Year at the annual New Zealand Cricket awards. The following month, he was named in New Zealand's squad for the 2019 Cricket World Cup.

On 10 May 2024, he announced his retirement from international cricket.
