= Kieran Noema-Barnett =

New Zealand cricketer

Personal information
- Full name: Kieran Noema-Barnett
- Born: 4 June 1987 (age 39); Dunedin, Otago, New Zealand
- Batting: Left-handed
- Bowling: Right-arm medium
- Role: All-rounder

Domestic team information
- Years: Team
- 2006/07: Otago
- 2008/09–2020/21: Central Districts (squad no. 17)
- 2015–2018: Gloucestershire (squad no. 11)
- FC debut: 29 March 2009 Central Districts v Auckland
- LA debut: 21 December 2008 Central Districts v Auckland

Career statistics
Competition	FC	LA	T20
Matches	82	75	111
Runs scored	2,893	1,171	1,384
Batting average	27.81	22.51	17.97
100s/50s	2/17	0/6	0/4
Top score	107	74	57*
Balls bowled	9,445	2,370	1,023
Wickets	128	47	38
Bowling average	33.88	42.91	40.65
5 wickets in innings	0	0	0
10 wickets in match	0	0	0
Best bowling	4/20	3/42	3/18
Catches/stumpings	47/–	34/–	22/–
- Source: CricketArchive, 23 August 2018

Kieran Noema-Barnett (born 4 June 1987) is a New Zealand cricketer. He played in the 2006 U-19 Cricket World Cup in Sri Lanka and for Otago in the Twenty20 competition in the 2006–07. He has played both first-class and List A cricket for Central Districts.

== Career ==
Born in Dunedin, Otago, New Zealand to an English father and New Zealand Maori mother, Noema-Barnett attended Kavanagh College. He excelled in many sports, mainly rugby, cricket and basketball. However cricket was his chosen sport and he excelled by making the New Zealand 2006 U-19 Cricket World Cup in Sri Lanka in a team that included Martin Guptill, Colin Munro and Tim Southee. Noema-Barnett then made his debut for the Otago Volts in the 20/20 campaign of 2006/07 season. After failing to secure a regular playing position with the Volts he moved to Napier in New Zealand's North Island and played for Hawkes Bay in an attempt to kick-start his career with the Central Districts Stags. His efforts were rewarded and he made his debut for the Stags in the 2008/09 season. Noema-Barnett has been a regular in the team since then and has since gone on to captain Central Districts in the 2012/13 and 2013/14 seasons capturing the Plunkett shield Four day championship in his maiden season at the helm.

On 12 December 2010, playing for the Central Stags, he scored the fastest half century in New Zealand 20/20 history, taking just 14 balls to reach 50, against Otago in Invercargill. On his way to 50 Noema-Barnett hit three fours and six sixes.

Noema-Barnett spent two seasons in Ireland with CSNICC. He was considered the best overseas player in the league and in his time smashed his way to 192 against Glendermott.

== Move to Gloucestershire ==
On 9 October 2014 it was announced that Noema-Barnett had signed with Gloucestershire County Cricket Club on a three-year deal. Noema-Barnett, a British passport holder's, father was born in England meaning he can play as a local player. Gloucestershire boss John Bracewell said "He is a fine all-rounder in all forms, He will strengthen and support our developing group with his leadership experience." Noema-Barnett added: "It's a very exciting time for myself and the club and I can't wait to get involved with the lads and contribute to the team."
