= Evan Watkin =

New Zealand cricket umpire

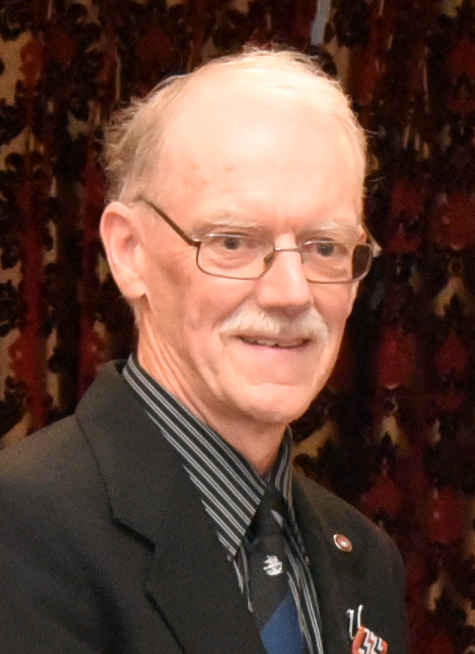
- Watkin in 2017

Personal information
- Full name: Evan Allan Watkin
- Born: 2 July 1951 (age 75); Te Aroha, Waikato, New Zealand
- Role: Umpire

Umpiring information
- Tests umpired: 3 (1998–2009)
- ODIs umpired: 23 (1995–2010)
- T20Is umpired: 3 (2006–2009)
- WTests umpired: 1 (1990)
- WODIs umpired: 13 (1992–2009)
- WT20Is umpired: 1 (2010)
- Source: Cricinfo, 18 March 2021

Evan Allan Watkin QSM (born 2 July 1951) is a New Zealand One-day International and Test cricket umpire. He was born in Te Aroha.

Watkin has umpired three Test matches, all played by New Zealand at the Basin Reserve in Wellington and McLean Park in Napier. His debut Test as an umpire was the 2nd Test between New Zealand and India in December 1998, and the other Tests in which he stood were the 2nd New Zealand-West Indies Test in December 1999, and the 2nd Test between New Zealand and India in March 2009.

Watkin has also umpired 23 One-day Internationals since 1995 — 21 of which were in the period from 1995 to 2002 — and 3 Twenty20 Internationals between 2006 and 2009. All of these matches have been played in New Zealand. Apart from his debut ODI, between India and South Africa in Hamilton on 18 February 1995, all have involved New Zealand. He has been the third umpire in another 35 ODIs and 6 T20Is, all in New Zealand.

In the 2017 Queen's Birthday Honours, Watkin was awarded the Queen's Service Medal, for services to cricket.

== See also ==
- List of Test cricket umpires
- List of One Day International cricket umpires
- List of Twenty20 International cricket umpires
