= Gareth Hopkins =

New Zealand cricketer

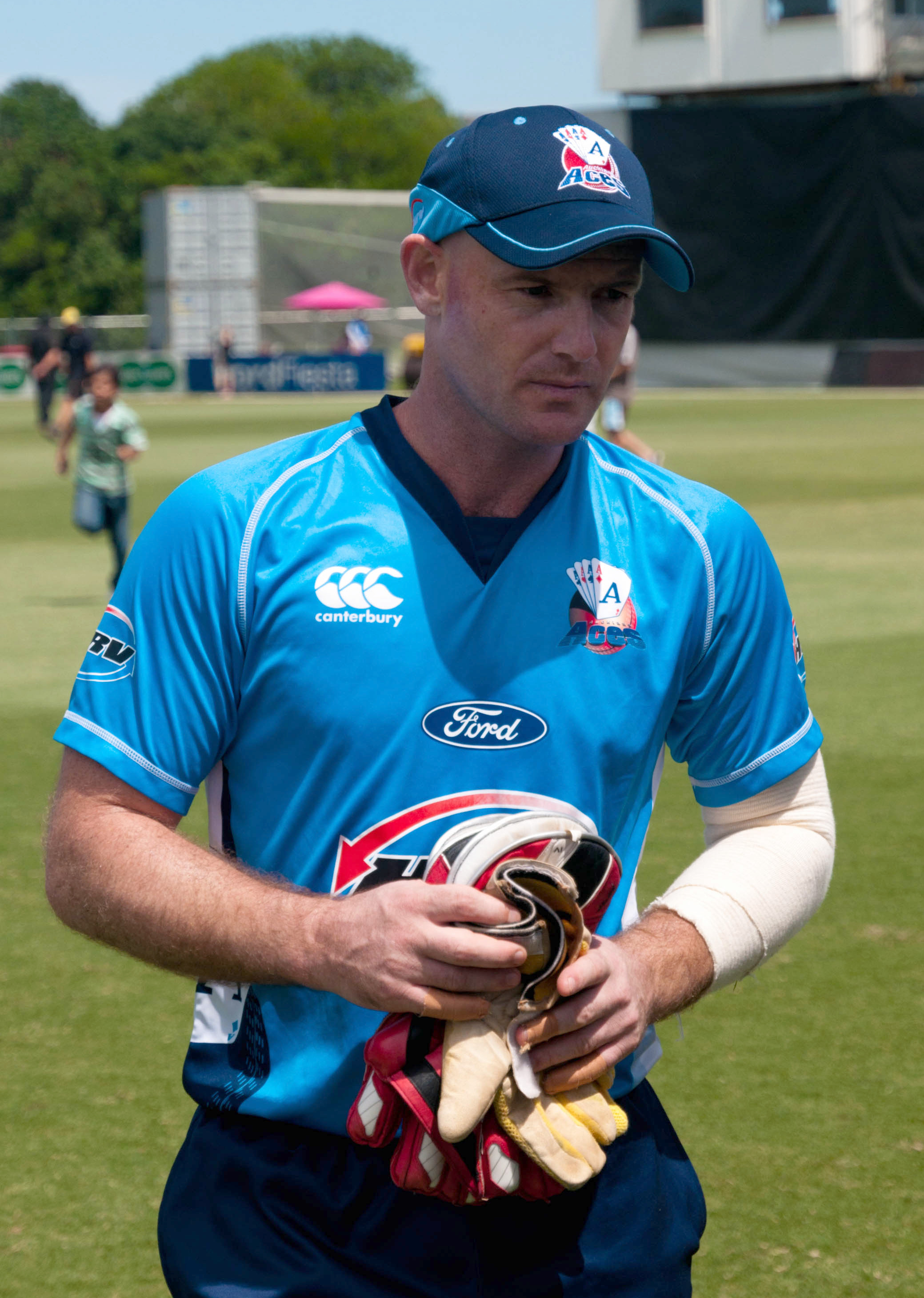

Personal information
- Full name: Gareth James Hopkins
- Born: 24 November 1976 (age 49); Lower Hutt, Wellington, New Zealand
- Batting: Right-handed
- Role: Wicket-keeper

International information
- National side: New Zealand (2004–2010)
- Test debut (cap 240): 5 June 2008 v England
- Last Test: 20 November 2010 v India
- ODI debut: 29 June 2004 v England
- Last ODI: 1 July 2008 v Ireland
- ODI shirt no.: 48
- T20I debut (cap 27): 23 November 2007 v South Africa
- Last T20I: 23 May 2010 v Sri Lanka

Domestic team information
- Years: Team
- 1995/96–1997/98: Northern Districts
- 1998/99–2002/03: Canterbury
- 2003/04–2006/07: Otago
- 2007/08–2013/14: Auckland

Career statistics
Competition	Test	ODI	FC	LA
Matches	4	25	158	203
Runs scored	71	236	7,550	4,013
Batting average	11.83	14.75	36.65	27.11
100s/50s	0/0	0/0	17/34	4/14
Top score	15	45	201	142
Catches/stumpings	9/0	27/1	435/26	217/30
- Source: CricInfo, 23 December 2023

Gareth James Hopkins (born 24 November 1976) is a New Zealand former international cricketer. A wicket-keeper, he played Test, One Day International (ODI) and Twenty20 International cricket for the New Zealand national cricket team between 2004 and 2010.

Hopkins was born at Lower Hutt in the Wellington Region in 1976 and was educated at Taupo College. He played age-group cricket for Northern Districts and played for the national under-19 team before making his senior representative debut for Northern Districts against Central Districts during the 1995–96 season.

== Cricket career ==
A wicket-keeper who was described as a "staunch" batsman and as "uncompromising" in his approach to batting, he moved to play for Canterbury for the 1998–99 season. After five seasons he moved to Otago for four seasons before finishing his domestic career playing for Auckland between the 2007–08 and 2013–14 seasons. The team won the domestic List A and Twenty20 competitions during the 2010–11 season and Hopkins finished his career with over 350 top-level domestic appearances.

Hopkins made his international debut in 2004, deputising for Brendon McCullum as New Zealand's wicket-keeper in five One Day Internationals during the tour of England. He spent much of his international career as McCullum's back-up, making his Test debut in 2008 following when McCullum was unable to play due to injury. Following a successful 2007–08 season he was awarded a central contract by New Zealand Cricket and played most of his four Test matches, 25 ODIs and 10 T20Is over the following three seasons. "Ordinary" form in 2010–11 saw him dropped from the central contracts list and he did not represent the national team after the end of 2010.

== Post-cricket career ==
Hopkins became a financial adviser with his wife since 2014. They have moved to reside in Tauranga.
