= Jamie How =

New Zealand cricketer

Personal information
- Full name: Jamie Michael How
- Born: 19 May 1981 (age 45); New Plymouth, Taranaki, New Zealand
- Batting: Right-handed
- Bowling: Right-arm medium
- Role: Opening batsman

International information
- National side: New Zealand (2005–2011)
- Test debut (cap 232): 9 March 2006 v West Indies
- Last Test: 26 March 2009 v India
- ODI debut (cap 143): 31 December 2005 v Sri Lanka
- Last ODI: 8 March 2011 v Pakistan
- T20I debut (cap 28): 23 November 2007 v South Africa
- Last T20I: 13 June 2008 v England

Domestic team information
- Years: Team
- 2000/01–2014/15: Central Districts

Career statistics
Competition	Test	ODI	FC	LA
Matches	19	41	131	165
Runs scored	772	1,046	7,647	4,852
Batting average	22.70	29.05	36.24	31.92
100s/50s	0/4	1/7	16/39	5/31
Top score	92	139	207*	222
Balls bowled	12	0	2,412	458
Wickets	0	–	25	8
Bowling average	–	–	51.88	52.87
5 wickets in innings	–	–	0	0
10 wickets in match	–	–	0	0
Best bowling	–	–	3/55	2/15
Catches/stumpings	18/–	19/–	153/–	84/–
- Source: ESPNcricinfo, 23 March 2017

Jamie Michael How (born 19 May 1981) is a former cricketer who has played Test match, One Day International and Twenty20 International cricket for New Zealand. He attended Palmerston North Boys' High School. In New Zealand domestic cricket, he played for and captained Central Districts. How is a steady scoring, right-handed opening batsman and occasional off-spin bowler. He made his first-class debut in 2000–2001 and his international debut in 2005–2006.

== Domestic career ==
In 2013, in a List A match against Northern Districts, How scored 222 from 138 deliveries, becoming the second-equal highest scorer ever in List A cricket history.

== International career ==
How forced his way into international contention through a series of good seasons for Central Districts. He made his international debut in a One Day International match against Sri Lanka in Queenstown on 31 December 2005.

How scored a brilliant 116-ball 139, his maiden ODI century, in chasing the massive total of 340 against England at Napier in 2008. How was eventually run out on the second-last ball of the New Zealand innings. The match was eventually tied.

He along with Peter Ingram set the record opening stand in T20 cricket in 2012 (201)

He was also selected to make his Test debut in the first Test against the West Indies on 9 March 2006 as an opening batsman. He struggled in his first few matches, failing to reach fifty in his first ten innings and was dropped from the team at the end of 2006. On his return to Tests in March 2007 – 2008, he posted his first half-century, a fluent 92 in the first Test against England at Hamilton. His second-innings 68 at Lord's a couple of months later laid the foundation for New Zealand to save the Test match.

== Personal life ==
He attended Palmerston North Boys High School.
