= Ryan McCone =

New Zealand cricketer

Personal information
- Full name: Ryan James McCone
- Born: 5 September 1987 (age 39); Christchurch, Canterbury, New Zealand
- Batting: Left-handed
- Bowling: Left-arm medium
- Role: All-rounder

Domestic team information
- Years: Team
- 2007/08–2017/18: Canterbury
- 2018/19: Central Districts
- FC debut: 2 February 2008 Canterbury v England
- Last FC: 17 March 2019 Central Districts v Northern Districts
- LA debut: 12 January 2011 Canterbury v Otago
- Last LA: 18 November 2018 Central Districts v Wellington

Career statistics
Competition	FC	LA	T20
Matches	53	40	30
Runs scored	953	138	28
Batting average	17.32	9.20	9.33
100s/50s	1/1	0/1	0/0
Top score	102	52	11
Balls bowled	8,879	1,629	495
Wickets	139	55	21
Bowling average	33.61	27.03	40.61
5 wickets in innings	5	2	0
10 wickets in match	0	0	0
Best bowling	5/46	6/19	2/22
Catches/stumpings	23/0	15/0	12/0
- Source: CricInfo, 5 January 2022

Ryan James McCone (born 5 September 1987) is a former New Zealand domestic cricketer, who played for Canterbury and Central Districts. He is a left-hand batsman and left-arm medium bowler. He made his début in the New Zealand State Championship in March 2009 and, with a century, became the first débutante number nine batsman to score a hundred.

== Career ==
=== Early life ===
Born in September 1987 in Christchurch, Canterbury, McCone grew up as a batsman, attended Cathedral Grammar School in Canterbury, where he scored 102* aged 12 or 13. When he reached the age of 16 he became a bowler, as he reached St. Andrew's School and their First XI cricket team. He also played for Lancaster Park-Woolston Cricket Club, batting at number three as well as at seven, eight or nine, and was also the club's leading wicket taker prior to his selection for Canterbury.

=== Selection ===
McCone was selected for Canterbury to play against England during the tour match of 2 February 2008, at Village Green, Christchurch. He bowled five wicket-less overs for 30, and scored two not out while batting at 11. He then played several matches for Canterbury's Second XI from 21 to 26 January 2009, including one performance of 2/36 against Otago's Second XI.

When McCone was 21 he was selected for their home State Championship match against Otago on 28 March 2009. Following a top order collapse, McCone, batting at number nine, score 102 runs from 214 in the first innings to help build – with the aid of a 105 knock from Kruger van Wyk – Canterbury's first innings total of 315. McCone scored his first 50 runs from 128 balls, and reached 100 from 168 balls just before the close of play. McCone then bowled ten wicketless overs for 33 as Otago were dismissed for 320. Canterbury reached 233/4 in reply before the match was drawn with no play on the final day due to rain. McCone's century was the first ever on debut for a New Zealand number nine in first-class cricket.

McCone returned for the 2009–10 season in a match against Central Districts on 3 December, and bowled 22 overs for his first wicket, returning 1/79. He scored 16 and 13 in Canterbury's two innings before Central Districts chased down 27 runs for a ten-wicket win. He played two more matches in the season, ending with 60 runs at 12.00, and five wickets at 67.20.

In June 2018, he was awarded a contract with Central Districts for the 2018–19 season.
