= Craig Cachopa =

New Zealand cricketer (born 1992)

Personal information
- Born: 17 January 1992 (age 34); Welkom, Orange Free State, South Africa
- Batting: Right-handed
- Role: Batsman
- Relatives: Brad Cachopa (brother); Carl Cachopa (brother)

International information
- National side: Portugal (2026–present)

Domestic team information
- Years: Team
- 2011/12: Wellington
- 2012/13–2014/15: Auckland
- 2014–2016: Sussex
- 2015/16: Wellington
- 2016/17–2019/20: Auckland

Career statistics
Competition	FC	LA	T20
Matches	47	88	103
Runs scored	2,752	2,211	1,977
Batting average	34.83	26.96	27.45
100s/50s	5/16	3/10	0/6
Top score	203	121	89*
Balls bowled	42	–	–
Wickets	0	–	–
Bowling average	–	–	–
5 wickets in innings	–	–	–
10 wickets in match	–	–	–
Best bowling	–	–	–
Catches/stumpings	28/–	48/0	53/1
- Source: CricketArchive, 6 October 2020

Craig Cachopa (born 17 January 1992) is a South African-born Portuguese cricketer who currently plays for the Portugal national cricket team and has previously represented New Zealand in age-group cricket. He played for Sussex in English county cricket and Auckland and Wellington at New Zealand domestic level. He now works as a Project Manager at a top New Zealand company.

== Early life and career ==
Cachopa was born in Welkom, in what is now South Africa's Free State province. His family emigrated to New Zealand in 2002, and he and two older brothers, Carl (born 1986) and Bradley Cachopa (born 1988), have all played first-class cricket in New Zealand. A right-handed batsman and occasional wicket-keeper, Craig Cachopa debuted for the New Zealand under-19s at the age of 16, and later captained the side at the 2010 Under-19 World Cup, hosted by New Zealand.

== Domestic career ==
He made his first-class debut for Wellington during the 2011–12 season of the Plunket Shield, but switched to Auckland the following season. Playing for Auckland against Wellington during the 2013–14 season, he scored 203 runs, his highest first-class score and only double century. Cachopa signed a two-year contract with Sussex, beginning with the 2014 English season, qualifying as a domestic player via a Portuguese passport. He had announced his intention to qualify for England, and will consequently be regarded as an overseas player if he wishes to return to Auckland.

In June 2018, he was awarded a contract with Auckland for the 2018–19 season. In September 2018, he was named as the captain of the Auckland Aces for the 2018 Abu Dhabi T20 Trophy. He was the leading run-scorer for Auckland in the 2018–19 Ford Trophy, with 412 runs in eleven matches.

== International career ==
Cachopa captained the New Zealand national under-19 cricket team at the 2010 Under-19 Cricket World Cup.

In 2014, he expressed his intention to represent England, but he was unable make it to the English team.

Cachopa is of Portuguese descent and holds a Portuguese passport through his father. In August 2026, he was named in Portugal's squad for the 2026 Men's T20 World Cup Europe Sub-regional Qualifier C, which formed part of the qualification pathway for the 2028 Men's T20 World Cup.
