= Mark Gillespie (New Zealand cricketer) =

New Zealand cricketer

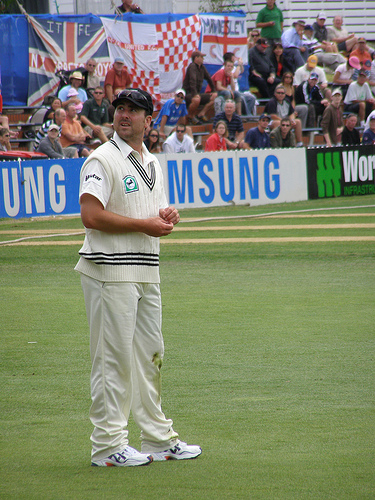

Personal information
- Full name: Mark Raymond Gillespie
- Born: 17 October 1979 (age 47); Wanganui, New Zealand
- Height: 6 ft 2 in (1.88 m)
- Batting: Right-handed
- Bowling: Right-arm fast-medium
- Role: Bowler

International information
- National side: New Zealand (2006–2012)
- Test debut (cap 235): 16 November 2007 v South Africa
- Last Test: 23 March 2012 v South Africa
- ODI debut (cap 145): 28 December 2006 v Sri Lanka
- Last ODI: 13 January 2009 v West Indies
- T20I debut (cap 20): 22 December 2006 v Sri Lanka
- Last T20I: 13 June 2008 v England

Domestic team information
- Years: Team
- 1999/00–2014/15: Wellington

Career statistics
Competition	Test	ODI	FC	LA
Matches	5	32	94	123
Runs scored	76	93	1,688	485
Batting average	10.85	15.50	17.05	10.77
100s/50s	0/0	0/0	0/6	0/0
Top score	28	28	81*	31
Balls bowled	868	1,521	19,051	6,109
Wickets	22	37	385	196
Bowling average	28.68	37.00	27.97	27.22
5 wickets in innings	3	0	19	3
10 wickets in match	0	0	2	0
Best bowling	6/113	4/58	6/38	6/38
Catches/stumpings	1/–	6/–	24/–	18/–
- Source: Cricinfo, 13 January 2019

Mark Raymond Gillespie (born 17 October 1979) is a former New Zealand cricketer. He came to the selectors attention in the 2005–06 season with 43 wickets at 23.16 for Wellington. He then played for New Zealand A in the Top-End series of 2006 before being included in New Zealand's squad of 14 for the Champions Trophy.

He had a successful domestic career for Wellington being crowned Wellington's cricketer of the year and Men's Outstanding Bowler in 2012.

== International career ==
Gillespie has taken Twenty20 Internationals with 4/7 during New Zealand's 9 wicket win over Kenya in the 2007 ICC World Twenty20.

On his Test Match debut, he took five wickets in the first innings against South Africa at Centurion in 2007.
