= Ian Butler (cricketer) =

New Zealand cricketer

Personal information
- Full name: Ian Gareth Butler
- Born: 24 November 1981 (age 44); Middlemore, New Zealand
- Nickname: Butts
- Height: 1.88 m (6 ft 2 in)
- Batting: Right-handed
- Bowling: Right-arm fast
- Role: Bowler

International information
- National side: New Zealand (2002–2013)
- Test debut (cap 218): 13 March 2002 v England
- Last Test: 22 October 2004 v Bangladesh
- ODI debut (cap 127): 13 February 2002 v England
- Last ODI: 11 February 2010 v Bangladesh
- ODI shirt no.: 2 (prev. 60)
- T20I debut (cap 35): 15 February 2009 v Australia
- Last T20I: 27 June 2013 v England

Domestic team information
- Years: Team
- 2001/02–2007/08: Northern Districts
- 2008/09–2013/14: Otago
- 2003: Gloucestershire
- 2004: Kent
- 2010: Gloucestershire
- 2013: Notts
- 2014: Northants

Career statistics
Competition	Test	ODI	FC	LA
Matches	8	26	72	111
Runs scored	76	84	1,261	838
Batting average	9.50	10.50	18.82	15.81
100s/50s	0/0	0/0	0/5	0/1
Top score	26	25	73*	53*
Balls bowled	1,368	1,109	11,041	4,936
Wickets	24	28	204	136
Bowling average	36.83	37.07	30.95	32.80
5 wickets in innings	1	0	4	2
10 wickets in match	0	0	1	0
Best bowling	6/46	4/44	6/46	5/33
Catches/stumpings	4/–	8/–	16/–	24/–
- Source: ESPNcricinfo, 31 December 2017

Ian Gareth Butler (born 24 November 1981) is a New Zealand cricketer who has dual UK citizenship. Butler was born in Middlemore in the Auckland urban area. He has represented New Zealand in all three formats of the game internationally. He is currently the bowling coach of Pakistan Super League franchise Islamabad United.

== Domestic career ==
At the age of 17, he had his first professional contract with Penrith in Lake District. The following year, he played for Purley in London.

He played for Northern Districts between 2001 and 2008 before moving to Otago, representing them in the 2009 Champions League Twenty20 in India.

He had stints in English county cricket with Gloucestershire in 2003 and Kent in 2004.

In 2007 Butler played for Harborne Cricket Club in Birmingham, and coached some boys from King Edward's School Birmingham, Edgbaston. In 2008 he again played for Harborne Cricket Club, as well as Lashings Cricket Club in London.

He then re-signed for Gloucestershire in the 2010 Friends Provident t20 tournament. In 2014 Butler signed for Northamptonshire.

== International career ==
His test best was 6 for 46 against Pakistan in Wellington in 2004. Following a series of back injuries, he has not appeared in first class cricket since December 2014 though he is still active in one day cricket for Northern Districts.

Butler was recalled to the New Zealand squad in early 2009, and played in a Twenty20 International against Australia in Sydney, going on to play in the 2009 and 2010 ICC World Twenty20 tournaments in England and the West Indies.

== Retirement ==
In 2014, Butler announced his retirement from cricket. In January 2022, Butler accepted the role of Director of Cricket at C.I.Y.M.S. Cricket Club in Belfast, Northern Ireland.

== Coaching career ==
In March 2025, he joined Pakistan Super League franchise Islamabad United as bowling coach replacing Azhar Mahmood.
