= Chris Gaffaney =

New Zealand former cricketer and umpire

Personal information
- Full name: Christopher Blair Gaffaney
- Born: 30 November 1975 (age 50); Dunedin, Otago, New Zealand
- Batting: Right-handed
- Role: Batsman

Domestic team information
- Years: Team
- 1995/96–2006/07: Otago
- FC debut: 17 January 1996 Otago v Auckland
- Last FC: 20 March 2005 Otago v Wellington
- LA debut: 26 November 1995 Otago v Wellington
- Last LA: 10 February 2007 Otago v Auckland

Umpiring information
- Tests umpired: 67 (2014–2026)
- ODIs umpired: 92 (2010–2025)
- T20Is umpired: 57 (2010–2026)
- WODIs umpired: 3 (2008)
- WT20Is umpired: 5 (2010–2016)

Career statistics
| Competition | First-class | List A |
|---|---|---|
| Matches | 83 | 113 |
| Runs scored | 4,711 | 2,411 |
| Batting average | 33.41 | 23.63 |
| 100s/50s | 8/24 | 1/11 |
| Top score | 194 | 101* |
| Balls bowled | 102 | 36 |
| Wickets | 2 | 1 |
| Bowling average | 23.50 | 36.00 |
| 5 wickets in innings | 0 | 0 |
| 10 wickets in match | 0 | 0 |
| Best bowling | 1/3 | 1/4 |
| Catches/stumpings | 73/– | 33/– |
- Source: Cricinfo, 23 November 2023

Christopher Blair Gaffaney (born 30 November 1975) is a New Zealand cricket umpire and former cricketer who played for Otago. He became an umpire after retiring as a player. A right-handed batsman, he played in 83 first-class and 113 List A matches. Gaffaney is currently a member of the ICC Elite umpire panel and officiates in Tests, One Day Internationals and Twenty20 Internationals.

== Umpiring career ==
Gaffaney made his ODI umpiring debut when Canada and Ireland played at Toronto in September 2010. He served as an umpire on the ICC International Panel of Umpires and later stood in his first Test match in a game between Zimbabwe and South Africa at Harare in August 2014.

Gaffaney was thereafter selected as one of the twenty umpires to stand in matches during the 2015 Cricket World Cup and stood in three matches as an on-field umpire during the tournament. A few months later he was elevated to the ICC Elite umpire panel for 2015–16.

In April 2019, he was named as one of the sixteen umpires to stand in matches during the 2019 Cricket World Cup.

In September 2020, he was named as one of the fifteen umpires to officiate in matches during the 2020 Indian Premier League and stood in the final as well.

In September 2023, he was named as one of the best sixteen match officials for 2023 Cricket World Cup.

== See also ==
- List of Test cricket umpires
- List of ODI cricket umpires
- List of T20I cricket umpires
