= Barry Frost =

New Zealand cricket umpire

Personal information
- Full name: Barry George Frost
- Born: 6 February 1958 (age 68); Auckland, New Zealand
- Role: Umpire

Umpiring information
- T20Is umpired: 3 (2010–2012)
- WODIs umpired: 10 (1997–2015)
- WT20Is umpired: 8 (2010–2015)
- FC umpired: 102 (1999–2016)
- LA umpired: 94 (1998–2016)
- Source: CricketArchive, 22 February 2023

Barry George Frost (born 6 February 1958) is a New Zealand former cricket umpire.

== Life and career ==
Frost grew up on a dairy farm near Leigh, north of Auckland. He attended Mahurangi College in Warkworth before going to Auckland to work. He played club cricket in Auckland, and took up umpiring in 1995–96, after retiring from senior ranks.

Frost made his List A cricket umpiring debut in 1998 and first-class cricket debut in the following year. He umpired three Twenty20 Internationals between 2010 and 2012, and 10 women's One-day internationals between 1997 and 2015. He was the founding President of the New Zealand Professional Cricket Umpires' Association in 2011.

In 2015–16 Frost became the eighth New Zealand umpire to officiate in 100 first-class matches. He retired after the 2015–16 season.

== See also ==
- List of Twenty20 International cricket umpires
