= Gary Baxter (umpire) =

New Zealand cricket umpire

Personal information
- Full name: Gary Arthur Vincent Baxter
- Born: 5 March 1952 (age 74); Christchurch, New Zealand
- Role: Umpire

Umpiring information
- ODIs umpired: 38 (2005–2014)
- T20Is umpired: 16 (2008–2014)
- WODIs umpired: 20 (1999–2014)
- WT20Is umpired: 4 (2010–2014)
- Source: CricketArchive, 3 November 2018

Gary Arthur Vincent Baxter (born 5 March 1952) is a New Zealand cricket umpire. Besides umpiring at the first-class level, he has stood in 38 ODI games and 16 Twenty20 Internationals between 2005 and 2014.

== Umpiring career ==
Baxter made his list A cricket debut in 1998, and first class cricket debut in the following year.

== See also ==
- List of One Day International cricket umpires
- List of Twenty20 International cricket umpires
