= 2009–10 Plunket Shield season =

Cricket tournament in New Zealand

2009–10 Plunket Shield
- Administrator(s): New Zealand Cricket
- Cricket format: First-class
- Tournament format(s): Double round-robin
- Champions: Northern Districts (7th title)
- Participants: 6
- Matches: 30

The 2009–10 Plunket Shield season is the 84th season of official first-class domestic cricket in New Zealand. The season began on 10 November 2009.

== Table ==
The Plunket Shield will be decided on points at the end of the 10 rounds.

Team	Pts	Pld	W	D	L	Quo
Northern Districts	52	10	6	2	2	7.860
Canterbury	36	10	4	3	3	7.124
Central Districts	32	10	4	3	3	−5.233
Otago	28	10	3	4	3	−3.099
Auckland	24	10	3	2	5	1.266
Wellington	20	10	2	2	6	−6.975

== Teams ==
Team	Home ground †
Auckland	Colin Maiden Park, Auckland
Canterbury	Mainpower Oval, Rangiora
Central Districts	McLean Park, Napier
Northern Districts	Seddon Park, Hamilton
Otago	University Oval, Dunedin
Wellington	Basin Reserve, Wellington

== Fixtures and results ==
=== Round 1 ===
10–13 Nov 2009

Otago	v	Northern Districts
88 (30 overs); Craig Cumming 42; Brent Arnel 6/18 (10)		410 (109.5 overs); Joseph Yovich 128; Nick Beard 3/59 (28.5)
334 (121 overs); Craig Cumming 126; Joseph Yovich 3/29 (11)		13–0 (4.2 overs); Michael Parlane 13*

Northern Districts won by 10 wickets
University Oval, Dunedin
Umpires: GAV Baxter & BG Frost

10–13 Nov 2009

Wellington	v	Canterbury
214 (87.3 overs); Joshua Brodie 66; Chris Martin 4/35 (16)		222 (85 overs); Andy Ellis 41; Iain O'Brien 5/75 (26)
262 (85.1 overs); Cameron Merchant 99; Leighton Burtt 5/57 (18.1)		191–6 (81.5 overs); Kruger van Wyk 85*; Jeetan Patel 2–19 (22)

Match Drawn
Basin Reserve, Wellington
Umpires: CB Gaffany and DJ Walker

10–13 Nov 2009

Auckland	v	Central Districts
403 (127 overs); Andrew de Boorder 125*; George Worker 2/41 (16)		418 (124 overs); Mathew Sinclair 165; Michael Bates 3/40 (22)
232–3 (85 overs); Richard Jones 98; Michael Mason 1–19 (13)

Match Drawn
Nelson Park, Napier
Umpires: DM Quested and T Parlane

=== Round 2 ===
17–20 Nov 2009

Canterbury	v	Otago
440 (125 overs); Peter Fulton 172; Sam Wells 5/75 (23)		235 (71 overs); Leighton Morgan 54; Shane Bond 4–63 (19)
265-5d (73 overs); Peter Fulton 77; Sam Wells 2–38 (13)		355 (89.3 overs); Warren McSkimming 70; Andy Ellis 3–37 (14)

Canterbury won by 115 runs
Mainpower Oval, Rangiora
Umpires: PD Jones & EA Watkins

17–20 Nov 2009

Central Districts	v	Northern Districts
94 (33.5 overs); Ross Taylor 29; Graeme Aldridge 6/49 (12.5)		279 (90.1 overs); Jonothon Boult 76; Michael Mason 5/94 (29.2)
310 (74 overs); Mathew Sinclair 93; Graeme Aldridge 5–96 (21)		129–1 (23 overs); Michael Parlane 66*; Ewen Thompson 1–15 (4)

Northern Districts won by 9 wickets
Cobham Oval, Whangārei
Umpires: BG Frost & EJ Gray

17–20 Nov 2009

Wellington	v	Auckland
356 (108.3 overs); Joshua Brodie 103; Michael Bates 3/92 (28.3)		274-9d (102.2 overs); Richard Jones 101; Jeetan Patel 4–73 (36)
255-5d (62 overs); Cameron Merchant 108; Lance Shaw 2–57 (15)		263 (91.4 overs); Jeet Raval 69; Jeetan Patel 3–87

Wellington won by 99 runs
Basin Reserve, Wellington
Umpires: DJ Walker and T Parlane

=== Round 3 ===
24–27 Nov 2009

Otago	v	Central Districts
534-8d (148.2 overs); Neil Broom 196; Ewen Thompson 5/122 (30.2)		190 (45.3 overs); Seth Rance 71; Sam Wells 5–26 (11)
133–8 (32 overs); Greg Todd 24; Michael Mason 4–63 (16)		517 (168 overs); Peter Ingram 135; Warren McSkimming 3–95 (31)

Match Drawn
Nelson Park, Napier
Umpires: BG Frost & EA Watkins

24–27 Nov 2009

Wellington	v	Northern Districts
263 (93 overs); Cameron Merchant 88; Tim Southee 8/27 (25)		281 (94.5 overs); Peter McGlashan 81; Jeetan Patel 4–48 (27.5)
304 (100.1 overs); Luke Woodcock 93; Brent Arnel 5–47 (21.1)		248 (87.1 overs); BJ Watling 90; Dewayne Bowden 4–48 (13.1)

Wellington won by 38 runs
Seddon Park, Hamilton
Umpires: PD Jones & TJ Parlane

24–27 Nov 2009

Canterbury	v	Auckland
540 (142.5 overs); Johann Myburgh 120; Michael Bates 3–73 (30)		392-7d (148 overs); Scott Styris 112; Andy Ellis 2–65 (26)
133-1d (39.5 overs); Rob Nicol 63*; Pieter Erasmus 1–16 (8)		160–4 (56 overs); Richard Jones 44; Chris Harris 2–23 (10.3)

Match Drawn
Queen Elizabeth II Park, Christchurch
Umpires: DM Quested & EJ Gray

=== Round 4 ===
3–6 Dec 2009

Wellington	v	Otago
391-6d (132 overs); Stewart Rhodes 142*; Neil Wagner 4/103 (29.4)		471-9d (132 overs); Neil Broom 136; Dewayne Bowden 4–125 (21)
203 (56 overs); Joshua Brodie 70; Anthony Bullick 3–53 (21)		124–1 (28.4 overs); Craig Cumming 53*; Dewayne Bowden 1–22 (6)

Otago won by 9 wickets
Queenstown Events Centre, Queenstown
Umpires: PD Jones & DJ Walker

3–6 Dec 2009

Central Districts	v	Canterbury
325 (102.2 overs); Jamie How 90; Leighton Burtt 5/108 (26.2)		171 (72.2 overs); Shanan Stewart 65; Mathew Sinclair 3–29 (15.4)
28–0 (3.5 overs); Peter Ingram 16*		180 (78.5 overs) f/o Kruger van Wyk 34; Michael Mason 5–42 (20.5)

Central Districts won by 10 wickets
Mainpower Oval, Rangiora
Umpires: CB Gaffany & TJ Parlane

3–6 Dec 2009

Northern Districts	v	Auckland
290-3d (61 overs); BJ Watling 136; Tarun Nethula 1–27 (3)		First Innings forfeit
Second Innings forfeit		235 (72 overs); Gareth Hopkins 76; Graeme Aldridge 4–67 (16)

Northern Districts won by 54 runs
Colin Maiden Park, Auckland
Umpires: BG Frost & EJ Gray

=== Round 5 ===
12–15 Dec 2009

Auckland	v	Otago
229 (53.4 overs); Andrew de Boorder 77*; Warren McSkimming 5/17 (11)		270 (87.4 overs); Greg Todd 78*; Michael Bates 5/83 (25.4)
354 (104.5 overs); Jeet Raval 134; Warren McSkimming 4/62 (24.5)		316–5 (79.1 overs); Neil Broom 152*; Bhupinder Singh 3/80 (28.1)

Otago won by 5 wickets
Colin Maiden Park, Auckland
Umpires: GAV Baxter & EA Watkins

12–15 Dec 2009

Wellington	v	Central Districts
440–9 Dec (150.2 overs); Luke Woodcock 220*; Michael Mason 3/46 (28)		205 (71.1 overs); Peter Ingram 59; Andy McKay 4/60 (20)
207–4 Dec (54 overs); Cameron Merchant 93; George Worker 2–78 (19)		445–1 (97.4 overs); Peter Ingram 245*; Ili Tugaga 1–54 (6.4)

Central Districts won by 9 wickets
Basin Reserve, Wellington
Umpires: CB Gaffany and BG Frost

12–15 Dec 2009

Northern Districts	v	Canterbury
205 (89 overs); Michael Parlane 65; Brandon Hiini 4/48 (21)		289–9 (102.2 overs); Johann Myburgh 107; Brent Arnel 4/53 (19.3)
111 (43.3 overs); Joseph Yovich 27*; Corey Anderson 5–22 (11.3)		31–0 (7.3 overs); Rob Nicol 22*

Canterbury won by 10 wickets
Seddon Park, Hamilton
Umpires: EJ Gray and T Parlane

=== Round 6 ===
25–28 February 2010

Wellington	v	Auckland
477/10 (117.3 overs); SJ Rhodes 124; GS Shaw 5/101 (26 overs)		480/3 (117.5 overs); TG McIntosh 171; RJ Schaw 2/96 (17 overs)
122/10 (48.3 overs); LJ Woodcock 30; TS Nethula 4/17 (9.3 overs)		121/0 (21.5 overs); JA Raval 61

Auckland won by 10 wickets
Colin Maiden Park, Auckland
Umpires: DM Quested & DG Paterson

25–28 February 2010

Canterbury	v	Northern Districts
558/4 (148.0 overs); SL Stewart 162*; BJ Arnel 2/85 (36 overs)		726/10 (189.2 overs); JAH Marshall 178*; JPT Donnelly 4/257 (69 overs)
85/1 (28 overs); RJ Nicol 45*; BJ Arnel 1/19 (7 overs)

Match Drawn
Mainpower Oval, Rangiora
Umpires: DJ Walker & WR Knights

25–28 February 2010

Central Districts	v	Otago
355/10 (95.4 overs); MS Sinclair 122; N Wagner 4/62 (23.4 overs)		330/10 (101.4 overs); AJ Redmond 136; EP Thompson 3/64 (25.4 overs)
95/5 (40 overs); BMK Patton 33; NB Beard 2/10 (8 overs)

Match Drawn
Queen's Park, Invercargill
Umpires: TJ Parlane & PJ Agent

=== Round 7 ===
4–7 March 2010

Central Districts	v	Canterbury
414/10 (126.3 overs); BJ Diamanti 94; RJ Nicol 3/65 (12.3 overs)		223/0 (58.3 overs); CFK van Wyk 59; EP Thompson 5/68 (21 overs)
361/9 (73.4 overs); MS Sinclair 76; JPT Donnelly 4/150 (28.4 overs)		551/5 (126 overs) f/o SL Stewart 227; EP Thompson 2/94 (35 overs)

Central Districts won by 1 wicket
Pukekura Park, New Plymouth
Umpires: EA Watkin & PL Gasston

4 July 2010

Otago	v	Auckland
387/10 (131.2 overs); CD Cumming 102; C de Grandhomme 2/34 (14.2 overs)		238/7 (63.0 overs); TG McIntosh 81; AD Bullick 3/51 (13 overs)
208/3 (35.0 overs); GR Todd 66*; LJ Shaw 1/56 (9.2 overs)		333/10 (94.5 overs); TG McIntosh 89; NB Beard 6/107 (36.5 overs)

Otago won by 24 runs
University Oval, Dunedin
Umpires: DG Paterson & EJ Gray

4–7 March 2010

Wellington	v	Northern Districts
193/10 (62.4 overs); CJ Nevin 53; GW Aldridge 6/57 (20.4 overs)		400/10 (100.5 overs); KS Williamson 170; SJ Rhodes 2/38 (13 overs)
258/10 (96.1 overs); SJ Murdoch 79; GW Aldridge 3/47 (20 overs)		44/1 (7.1 overs); BJ Watling 21; MJ Tugaga 1/6 (1 overs)

Northern Districts won by 9 wickets
Basin Reserve, Wellington
Umpires: DM Quested & DW Reid

=== Round 8 ===
12–15 March 2010

Wellington	v	Central Districts
250/10 (87.5 overs); LJ Woodcock 73*; DAJ Bracewell 5/47 (18 overs)		232/10 (66 overs); BJ Diamanti 40; MJ Tugaga 5/77 (22 overs)
207/10 (95.2 overs); NR Parlane 90; DAJ Bracewell 4/59 (23.2 overs)		228/3 (48.4 overs); PJ Ingram 59; LJ Woodcock 1/14 (7 overs)

Central Districts won by 7 wickets
McLean Park, Napier
Umpires: BG Frost & EJ Gray

12–15 March 2010

Auckland	v	Northern Districts
227/10 (79.4 overs); RA Young 50; KS Williamson 2/11 (5 overs)		410/10 (140.3 overs); KS Williamson 192; AK Kitchen 2/31 (7 overs)
188/10 (63.3 overs); MD Bates 57; GW Aldridge 4/19 (13 overs)		9/0 (1 overs)

Northern Districts won by 10 wickets
Cobham Oval, Whangārei
Umpires: PD Jones & TJ Parlane

12–15 March 2010

Canterbury	v	Otago
315/10 (114.3 overs); MHW Papps 83; AD Bullick 3/57 (21.3 overs)		221/0 (74 overs); DC de Boorder 55; CS Martin 3/52 (15 overs)
340/5 (89 overs); MHW Papps 122; WC McSkimming 4/71 (00.0 overs)		276/10 (92.2 overs); CD Cumming 82; TD Astle 5/55 (22 overs)

Canterbury won by 158 runs
Queenstown Events Centre, Queenstown
Umpires: DJ Walker & AT Holdstock

=== Round 9 ===
20–23 March 2010

Central Districts	v	Auckland
269/10 (96.5 overs); BBJ Griggs 65*; Bhupinder Singh 4/93 (32 overs)		635/6 (158.0 overs); GJ Hopkins 201; GH Worker 3/204 (42 overs)
273/10 (87.0 overs); MS Sinclair 129; MD Bates 5/71 (27 overs)

Auckland won by innings and 93 runs
Colin Maiden Park, Auckland
Umpires: EJ Gray & A Holdstock

20–23 March 2010

Wellington	v	Canterbury
176/10 (60.1 overs); LJ Woodcock 76; BC Hiini 4/34 (15.1 overs)		318/10 (88.3 overs); SL Stewart 101; MJ Tugaga 4/74 (17 overs)
447/10 (137.5 overs); JEC Franklin 162; TD Astle 5/118 (30 overs)		306/5 (99.4 overs); SL Stewart 92*; MJ Tugaga 2/77 (22 overs)

Canterbury won by 5 wickets
Mainpower Oval, Rangiora
Umpires: EA Watkin & BG Frost

20–23 March 2010

Northern Districts	v	Otago
465/9 (145.0 overs); BS Wilson 107; NB Beard 3/78 (32 overs)		576/8 (180.1 overs); CD Cumming 160; GW Aldridge 4/151 (40 overs)
212/7 (63 overs); JAH Marshall 39*; NB Beard 3/31 (16 overs)

Match Drawn
Cobham Oval, Whangārei
Umpires: DM Quested & MP George

=== Round 10 ===
29 March – 1 April 2010

Canterbury	v	Auckland
203/10 (49.3 overs); MHW Papps 104; MD Bates 6/55 (19 overs)		352/10 (98.2 overs); AP de Boorder 91; TD Astle 6/103 (35 overs)
485/10 (127.5 overs); MHW Papps 180; RR Sherlock 7/133 (28 overs)		337/3 (90.2 overs); RA Jones 170; MJ Vermuelen 2/67 (17 overs)

Auckland won by 7 wickets
Colin Maiden Park, Auckland
Umpires: DJ Walker & EA Watkin

29 March – 1 April 2010

Central Districts	v	Northern Districts
217/10 (61.0 overs); PJ Ingram 85; GW Aldridge 3/43 (17 overs)		343/10 (87.3 overs); PD McGlashan 115; MJ Mason 3/68 (21 overs)
531/7 (125.1 overs); PJ Ingram 178; KS Williamson 3/87 (00.0 overs)		411/4 (93.3 overs); HJH Marshall 108; MJ Mason 2/74 (22 overs)

Northern Districts won by 6 wickets
McLean Park, Napier
Umpires: BG Frost & TJ Parlane

29 March – 1 April 2010

Wellington	v	Otago
389/10 (125.1 overs); JD Ryder 103; SR Wells 3/49 (18.1 overs)		192/10 (72.1 overs); SR Wells 102*; JEC Franklin 3/27 (15.1 overs)
402/3 (74.3 overs); NR Parlane 193; GR Todd 2/73 (17 overs)		344/7 (110.0 overs); CD Cumming 103; MJ Tugaga 3/69 (24 overs)

Match Drawn
Basin Reserve, Wellington
Umpires: PD Jones & EJ Gray

== Statistics ==
=== Most Runs ===
Player	Team	Matches	Innings	Runs	Average	HS	100s	50s
Luke Woodcock	Wellington	10	20	988	65.86	220*	1	7
Richard Jones	Auckland	10	17	953	59.56	170	4	2
Michael Papps	Canterbury	10	20	927	48.74	180	4	4
Craig Cumming	Otago	9	16	924	61.60	160	4	4
Peter Ingram	Central Districts	7	13	855	77.71	245*	3	3
Last Updated on 3 April

=== Most Wickets ===
Player	Team	Matches	Overs	Wickets	Average	BBI	5WI	10WM
Graeme Aldridge	Northern Districts	9	291.3	42	23.04	6/49	3	1
Michael Bates	Auckland	10	356.5	37	27.45	6/55	3	-
Ewen Thompson	Central Districts	8	278.1	34	24.08	5/122	1	-
Michael Mason	Central Districts	10	264.1	30	25.26	5/42	2	-
Brent Arnel	Northern Districts	9	235.1	29	19.58	6/18	2	-
Last Updated on 3 April

== See also ==
- Plunket Shield
- New Zealand limited-overs cricket trophy
- State Twenty20
- 2009–10 New Zealand one-day cricket competition season
