= 2009–10 New Zealand one-day cricket competition season =

2009–10 New Zealand One-Day Cricket Competition
- Administrator: New Zealand Cricket
- Cricket format: Limited overs cricket
- Tournament format: Double round-robin
- Champions: Northern Districts Knights (7th title)
- Participants: 6
- Matches: 28
- Player of the series: KS Williamson

The 2009–10 New Zealand one-day competition is the 39th season of official List A domestic cricket in New Zealand. This year there is no sponsor for the one day competition. The season began on 8 December 2009 with Otago Volts playing Wellington Firebirds, Auckland Aces playing Northern Districts Knights and Central Districts Stags playing Canterbury Wizards.

== Points table ==
The winner of the 2009–10 New Zealand one-day competition was found in the final on 21 February 2010.

| Pos | Team | Pld | W | L | T | NR | BP | Pts | NRR |
|---|---|---|---|---|---|---|---|---|---|
| 1 | Auckland Aces | 8 | 5 | 2 | 1 | 0 | 2 | 24 | 0.596 |
| 2 | Northern Districts | 8 | 5 | 3 | 0 | 0 | 1 | 21 | 0.134 |
| 3 | Canterbury Wizards | 8 | 4 | 3 | 1 | 0 | 1 | 19 | −0.046 |
| 4 | Central Districts Stags | 8 | 4 | 4 | 0 | 0 | 1 | 17 | 0.568 |
| 5 | Otago Volts | 8 | 3 | 5 | 0 | 0 | 1 | 13 | −0.411 |
| 6 | Wellington Firebirds | 8 | 2 | 6 | 0 | 0 | 0 | 8 | −0.992 |

== Teams ==
| Club | Home Ground | Captain |
|---|---|---|
| Auckland Aces | Eden Park | Gareth Hopkins |
| Canterbury Wizards | AMI Stadium | Kruger van Wyk |
| Central Districts Stags | McLean Park | Jamie How |
| Northern Districts Knights | Seddon Park | James Marshall |
| Otago Volts | University Oval | Craig Cumming |
| Wellington Firebirds | Basin Reserve | Matthew Bell |

== Fixture ==
=== 8 December ===
8 December 2009
(scorecard)

| Wellington Firebirds; 153/7 (22 overs) | v | Otago Volts; 154/4 (21 overs) |
| Stewart Rhodes 33*; Anthony Bullick 2/28 (5 overs) | | Neil Broom 61*; Stewart Rhodes 1/14 (3 overs) |

Otago Volts won by 6 wickets
Queenstown Events Centre, Queenstown
Umpires: Phil Jones and Derek Walker

- Anthony Bullick (Otago), Stewart Rhodes and Ili Tugaga (Wellington) all made their List A debuts.

8 December 2009
(scorecard)

| Auckland Aces; 264/8 (50 overs) | v | Northern Districts Knights; 265/8 (49.2 overs) |
| Reece Young 65; Bradley Scott 2/33 (8 overs) | | Michael Parlane 47; Roneel Hira 3/54 (10 overs) |

Northern Districts Knights won by 2 wickets
Colin Maiden Park, Auckland
Umpires: Barry Frost and Evan Gray

- Bhupinder Singh (Auckland) made his List A debut.

8 December 2009
(scorecard)

| Central Districts Stags; 301/9 (50 overs) | v | Canterbury Wizards; 286 (49.2 overs) |
| George Worker 84; Carl Frauenstein 4/48 (10 overs) | | Michael Papps 150; Ewen Thompson 3/45 (10 overs) |

Central Districts Stags won by 15 runs
Mainpower Oval, Rangiora
Umpires: Chris Gaffaney and Tim Parlane

=== 17 December ===
17 December 2009
(scorecard)

| Auckland Aces; 283/9 (50 overs) | v | Otago Volts; 246 (47.3 overs) |
| Ravi Bopara 89; Anthony Bullick 3/49 (9 overs) | | Shaun Haig 81; Bhupinder Singh 2/36 (9 overs) |

Auckland Aces won by 37 runs
Colin Maiden Park, Auckland
Umpires: Gary Baxter and Evan Watkin

- Andrew de Boorder (Auckland) and Nick Beard (Otago) both made their List A debuts.

17 December 2009
(scorecard)

| Central Districts Stags; 217 (49.5 overs) | v | Wellington Firebirds; 219/4 (43.5 overs) |
| Brendon Diamanti 68; Andy McKay 4/47 (8.5 overs) | | James Franklin 84*; Kieran Noema-Barnett 1/6 (2 overs) |

Wellington Firebirds won by 6 wickets
Basin Reserve, Wellington
Umpires: Barry Frost and Chris Gaffaney

17 December 2009
(scorecard)

| Canterbury Wizards; 296/7 (50 overs) | v | Northern Districts Knights; 254/9 (50 overs) |
| Shanan Stewart 97; Bruce Martin 2/45 (9 overs) | | Michael Parlane 80; Corey Anderson 5/26 (7 overs) |

Canterbury Wizards won by 42 runs
Seddon Park, Hamilton
Umpires: Evan Gray and Tim Parlane

=== 20 December ===
20 December 2009
(scorecard)

| Canterbury Wizards; 279/7 (50 overs) | v | Wellington Firebirds; 139 (36.1 overs) |
| CJ Anderson 52*; IE O'Brien 2/45 (10 overs) | | LJ Woodcock 28; CS Martin 4/25 (10 overs) |

Canterbury Wizards won 140 runs
Basin Reserve, Wellington
Umpires: EA Watkin & EJ Gray

20 December 2009
(scorecard)

| Auckland Aces; 246/8 (50 overs) | v | Central Districts Stags; 266/9 (49.1 overs) |
| RS Bopara 102; MJ Mason 3/48 (10 overs) | | JM How 94; MD Bates 4/27 (9.1 overs) |

Auckland Aces won by 20 runs
Fitzherbert Park, Palmerston North
Umpires: PD Jones & GAV Baxter

20 December 2009
(scorecard)

| Northern Districts Knights; 224/6 (30 overs) | v | Otago Volts; 205 (29.1 overs) |
| BJ Watling 58; N Wagner 3/42 (6 overs) | | NT Broom 58; TA Boult 3/37 (6 overs) |

Northern Districts Knights won by 19 runs
Queens Park, Invercargill
Umpires: DJ Walker & CB Gaffaney

- rain reduced match, 30 overs per a side

=== 23 December ===
23 December 2009
(scorecard)

| Auckland Aces; 230 (49.5 overs) | v | Wellington Firebirds; 149 (42 overs) |
| AP de Boorder 57; JS Patel 3/38 (10 overs) | | SJ Rhodes 36; DR Tuffey 3/12 (8 overs) |

Auckland Aces won by 81 runs
Colin Maiden Park, Auckland
Umpires: CB Gaffaney & EA Watkin

23 December 2009
(scorecard)

| Northern Districts Knights; 300/5 (50 overs) | v | Central Districts Stags; 306/7 (47.3 overs) |
| KS Williamson 107*; EP Thompson 2/30 (10 overs) | | GR Napier 73*; KS Williamson 3/48 (10 overs) |

Central Districts Stags won by 3 wickets
Fitzherbert Park, Palmerston North
Umpires: GAV Baxter & TJ Parlane

=== 28 December ===
28 December 2009
scorecard

| Canterbury Wizards; 282 (50 overs) | v | Auckland Aces; 283/5 (44.4 overs) |
| JG Myburgh 112; MD Bates 2/55 (10 overs) | | MJ Guptill 156; CS Martin 2/49 (9.4 overs) |

Auckland Aces won by 5 wickets
Queen Elizabeth II Park, Christchurch
Umpires: GAV Baxter & EA Watkin

28 December 2009
scorecard

| Central Stags; 297 (49.3 overs) | v | Otago Volts; 238 (44.4 overs) |
| JDP Oram 78; IG Butler 4/45 (9.3 overs) | | IG Butler 43; JDP Oram 3/38 (9 overs) |

Central Stags won by 59 runs
University Oval, Dunedin
Umpires: BG Frost & CB Gaffaney

28 December 2009
scorecard

| Northern Knights; 223 (49.3 overs) | v | Wellington Firebirds; 156/4 (34.1 overs) |
| KS Williamson 70; DJ Bowden 2/41 (10 overs) | | MD Bell 40; BJ Arnel 2/23 (5 overs) |

Wellington Firebirds won by 22 runs (D/L Method)
Seddon Park, Hamilton
Umpires: EJ Gray & PD Jones

- Rain stopped play after 34.1 over into Wellington Firebirds innings

=== 31 December ===
31 December 2009
scorecard

| Canterbury Wizards; 410/5 (50 overs) | v | Otago Volts; 371/7 (50 overs) |
| RJ Nicol 132; N Wagner 2/74 (9 overs) | | NT Broom 164; RD Burson 2/63 (9 overs) |

Canterbury Wizards won by 39 runs
Aorangi Oval, Timaru
Umpires: EJ Gray & TJ Parlane

=== 3 February ===
3 February 2009
scorecard

| Canterbury Wizards; 77/10 (32.4 overs) | v | Central Stags; 79/2 (14.2 overs) |
| SL Stewart 21; EP Thompson 6/20 (9.4 overs) | | JM How 46*; C Frauenstein 1/13 (2.2 overs) |

Central Stags won by 8 wickets
Pukekura Park, New Plymouth
Umpires: EJ Gray & WR Knights

3 February 2009
scorecard

| Auckland Aces; 362/5 (50 overs) | v | Otago Volts; 278/10 (00 overs) |
| TG McIntosh 138; SR Wells 1/24 (3 overs) | | Yasir Arafat 110*; LJ Shaw 4/49 (8.5 overs) |

Auckland Aces won by 84 runs
Whitestone Contracting Stadium, Oamaru
Umpires: DW Reid & TJ Parlane

3 February 2009
scorecard

| Wellington Firebirds; 216/9 (50 overs) | v | Northern Knights; 217/3 (33 overs) |
| CJ Nevin 63; BE Scott 2/30 (8 overs) | | KS Williamson 108; MR Gillespie 2/61 (7 overs) |

Northern Knights won by 7 wickets
Basin Reserve, Wellington
Umpires: BG Frost & DG Paterson

=== 6 February ===
6 February 2009
scorecard

| Canterbury Wizards; 287/7 (50 overs) | v | Auckland Aces; 287/10 (00 overs) |
| MHW Papps 000; RS Bopara 3/44 (10 overs) | | SB Styris 71; SE Bond 3/54 (10 overs) |

Match tied
Colin Maiden Park, Auckland
Umpires: MP George & DJ Walker

6 February 2009
scorecard

| Central Stags; 240/10 (50 overs) | v | Northern Knights; 241/8 (49.3 overs) |
| MS Sinclair 62; GW Aldridge 3/40 (8 overs) | | KS Williamson 77; GR Napier 3/40 (10 overs) |

Northern Knights won by 2 wickets
Cobham Oval, Whangārei
Umpires: PD Jones & PL Gasston

=== 7 February ===
7 February 2009
scorecard

| Wellington Firebirds; 169/10 (43.4 overs) | v | Otago Volts; 171/2 (35.4 overs) |
| CJ Nevin 000; AD Bullick 3/35 (5.4 overs) | | SB Haig 93*; MR Gillespie 2/30 (4.4 overs) |

Otago Volts won by 8 wickets
Basin Reserve, Wellington
Umpires: BG Frost & DM Quested

=== 9 February ===
9 February 2009
scorecard

| Auckland Aces; 239/10 (50 overs) | v | Northern Knights; 240/7 (48.1 overs) |
| RS Bopara 89; BE Scott 3/43 (10 overs) | | KS Williamson 81; PB Erasmus 3/45 (8 overs) |

Northern Knights won by 3 wickets
Cobham Oval, Whangārei
Umpires: EJ Gray & GM Elliott

9 February 2009
scorecard

| Wellington Firebirds; 299/7 (50 overs) | v | Canterbury Wizards; 300/5 (48.4 overs) |
| NR Parlane 57; C Frauenstein 3/44 (8 overs) | | SL Stewart 101; MR Gillespie 2/51 (8 overs) |

Canterbury Wizards won by 5 wickets
Queen Elizabeth II Park, Christchurch
Umpires: PD Jones & WR Knights

9 February 2009
scorecard

| Central Stags; 253/9 (50 overs) | v | Otago Volts; 254/8 (00 overs) |
| BJ Diamanti 56; AD Bullick 4/60 (9 overs) | | DJ Broom 73; GH Worker 2/49 (10 overs) |

Otago Volts won by 2 wickets
Pukekura Park, New Plymouth
Umpires: DG Paterson & TJ Parlane

== Preliminary Finals ==
=== 13 February ===
13 February 2009
scorecard

| Northern Knights; 104/10 (32.5 overs) | v | Auckland Aces; 108/2 (21 overs) |
| JAH Marshall 25; MD Bates 3/8 (6 overs) | | RA Young 58; BJ Arnel 1/17 (3 overs) |

Auckland Aces won by 8 wickets
Colin Maiden Park, Auckland
Umpires: EA Watkin & GAV Baxter

13 February 2009
scorecard

| Canterbury Wizards; 258/8 (50 overs) | v | Central Stags; 260/4 (47.1 overs) |
| MHW Papps 93; SHA Rance 4/71 (10 overs) | | MS Sinclair 105*; JG Myburgh 2/22 (6 overs) |

Central Stags won by 6 wickets
Queen Elizabeth II Park, Christchurch
Umpires: BG Frost & CB Gaffaney

=== 17 February ===
2009
scorecard

| Northern Knights; 284/6 (50 overs) | v | Central Stags; 201/10 (43.5 overs) |
| KS Williamson 84; SHA Rance 3/63 (10 overs) | | MS Sinclair 54; BE Scott 3/40 (7 overs) |

Northern Knights won by 83 runs
Cobham Oval, Whangārei
Umpires: BG Frost & EA Watkin

== Final ==
=== 21 February ===
21 February 2009
scorecard

| Northern Knights; 304/3 (50 overs) | v | Auckland Aces; 283/9 (50 overs) |
| BJ Watling 145*; SB Styris 1/41 (10 overs) | | RS Bopara 62; KS Williamson 5/51 (8 overs) |

Northern Knights won by 21 runs
Colin Maiden Park, Auckland
Umpires: GAV Baxter & CB Gaffaney

== See also ==
- Plunket Shield
- New Zealand limited-overs cricket trophy
- 2009–10 Plunket Shield season
