= 2010–11 HRV Cup =

- Administrator: New Zealand Cricket
- Cricket format: Twenty20
- Tournament format: Double round-robin
- Champions: Auckland Aces (2nd title)
- Participants: 6
- Matches: 31
- Player of the series: Ryan ten Doeschate
- Most runs: Rob Nicol (285)
- Most wickets: Michael Mason (15)

The 2010–11 HRV Cup (named after the competition's sponsor HRV) was the sixth season of the Men's Super Smash Twenty20 cricket tournament in New Zealand. The season was held between 2 December 2010 and 2 January 2011.

== Rules and regulations ==
Points
Results	Points
Win	4 points
No result	2 points
Loss	0 points

If a match ended with the scores tied, the tie is broken with a one-over-per-side Super Over.

== Standings ==
Pos	Team	Pld	W	L	T	NR	Pts	NRR
1	Auckland Aces (C)	10	6	2	0	2	28	−0.191
2	Central Districts Stags (R)	10	6	3	0	1	26	0.708
3	Canterbury Wizards	10	5	4	0	1	22	0.181
4	Northern Districts Knights	10	4	5	0	1	18	0.046
5	Wellington Firebirds	10	4	5	0	1	18	−0.212
6	Otago Volts	10	0	6	0	4	8	−0.973

Source: Full table on cricinfo

(C) = Eventual Champion; (R) = Runner-up.
Winner qualified for the qualifying stage of the 2011 Champions League Twenty20.

== Teams ==
Club	Home ground	Captain
Auckland Aces	Eden Park	Gareth Hopkins
Canterbury Wizards	AMI Stadium	Kruger van Wyk
Central Districts Stags	Pukekura Park	Jamie How
Northern Districts Knights	Seddon Park	James Marshall
Otago Volts	University Oval	Craig Cumming
Wellington Firebirds	Basin Reserve	Matthew Bell

== League progression ==
	Group Matches										Knockout
Team	1	2	3	4	5	6	7	8	9	10	F
Auckland Aces	4	4	8	12	16	18	20	24	28	28	W
Central Districts Stags	4	8	12	14	18	22	22	22	22	26	L
Canterbury Wizards	4	8	8	12	12	12	12	16	18	22	
Northern Districts Knights	0	4	8	12	16	18	18	18	18	18	
Wellington Firebirds	4	4	8	8	8	10	14	14	14	18	
Otago Volts	0	0	0	0	0	2	4	6	8	8	
Note: The total points at the end of each group match are listed. Note: Click on the points (group matches) or W/L (Knockout) to see the summary for the match.				Win			Loss			No result	
Note: The total points at the end of each group match are listed. Note: Click on the points (group matches) or W/L (Knockout) to see the summary for the match.				Team was eliminated before the league reached this stage.							

== Results ==
	Auckland Aces	Canterbury Wizards	Central Districts Stags	Northern Districts Knights	Otago Volts	Wellington Firebirds
Auckland Aces		Auckland; 12 runs	Auckland; 50 runs	Northern Districts; 8 wickets	Abandoned; No result	Abandoned; No result
Canterbury Wizards	Auckland; 1 run		Central Districts; 3 runs	Canterbury; 60 runs	Canterbury; 6 wickets	Canterbury; 5 runs
Central Districts Stags	Central Districts; 8 wickets	Canterbury; 6 runs		Central Districts; 6 wickets	Abandoned; No result	Wellington; 8 wickets
Northern Districts Knights	Auckland; 8 wickets	Northern Districts; 8 wickets	Central Districts; 78 runs		Abandoned; No result	Wellington; 43 runs
Otago Volts	Auckland; 8 runs (D/L)	Abandoned; No result	Central District; 7 wickets	Northern Districts; 9 wickets		Wellington; 3 wickets
Wellington Firebirds	Auckland; 2 runs	Canterbury; 3 wickets	Central Districts; 29 runs	Northern Districts; 54 runs	Wellington; 3 wickets	

Note: Results listed are according to the home and visitor teams.
Note: Click on the results to see match summary.

Home team won	Visitor team won	Match abandoned

== Fixtures ==
All times shown are in New Zealand Daylight Time (UTC+13).

=== Group stage ===
2 December
18:00
Scorecard

Central Districts Stags; 177/5 (20 overs)	v	Northern Districts Knights (H); 99 (18.2 overs)
Ian Blackwell 45 (24); Trent Boult 2/35 (4 overs)		Brad Hodge 35 (39); Michael Mason 3/17 (4 overs)

Central Districts won by 78 runs
Seddon Park, Hamilton
Umpires: Barry Frost and Phil Jones

- Northern Districts won the toss and chose to field.

3 December
17:00
Scorecard

(H) Auckland Aces; 154/8 (20 overs)	v	Central Districts Stags; 104 (16.3 overs)
Dusan Hakaraia 43 (38); Ian Blackwell 3/40 (4 overs)		Kruger van Wyk 25 (25); Andre Adams 5/20 (4 overs)

Auckland won by 50 runs
Colin Maiden Park, Auckland
Umpires: Chris Gaffaney and Evan Gray

- Auckland won the toss and chose to bat.

4 December
14:00
Scorecard

Otago Volts; 153/6 (20 overs)	v	Wellington Firebirds (H); 156/7 (19.4 overs)
Aaron Redmond 82 (54); Damien Wright 2/10 (4 overs)		Stewart Rhodes 49 (53); Neil Wagner 3/29 (3.4 overs)

Wellington won by 3 wickets
Basin Reserve, Wellington
Umpires: Phil Jones and Tim Parlane

- Wellington won the toss and chose to field.

5 December
14:00
Scorecard

(H) Auckland Aces; 74 (18.5 overs)	v	Northern Districts Knights; 76/2 (9.3 overs)
Bradley Cachopa 26* (40); Bradley Scott 3/17 (3.5 overs)		Brad Hodge 37* (25); Andre Adams 1/16 (3 overs)

Northern Districts won by 8 wickets
Colin Maiden Park, Auckland
Umpires: Chris Gaffaney and Evan Watkin

- Auckland won the toss and chose to bat.

5 December
14:00
Scorecard

(H) Wellington Firebirds; 148/5 (20 overs)	v	Canterbury Wizards; 151/7 (19.4 overs)
Michael Pollard 54 (41); Ryan ten Doeschate 2/21 (3 overs)		Ryan ten Doeschate 41 (39); Luke Woodcock 2/15 (4 overs)

Canterbury won by 3 wickets
Basin Reserve, Wellington
Umpires: Phil Jones and Derek Walker

- Canterbury won the toss and chose to field.

8 December
17:00
Scorecard

(H) Otago Volts; 132 (20 overs)	v	Northern Districts Knights; 134/1 (13.2 overs)
Ian Butler 26 (16); Graeme Aldridge 3/24 (4 overs)		Brad Hodge 68* (41); James McMillan 1/22 (3.2 overs)

Northern Districts won by 9 wickets
Whitestone Contracting Stadium, Oamaru
Umpires: Chris Gaffaney and Tim Parlane

- Northern Districts won the toss and chose to field.

9 December
17:00
Scorecard

(H) Central Districts Stags; 128/8 (20 overs)	v	Wellington Firebirds; 132/2 (19.3 overs)
Peter Ingram 46 (35); Luke Woodcock 3/24 (4 overs)		Stewart Rhodes 75* (60); Doug Bracewell 1/18 (1.3 overs)

Wellington won by 8 wickets
Saxton Oval, Nelson
Umpires: Barry Frost and Phil Jones

- Central Districts won the toss and chose to bat.

10 December
17:00
Scorecard

(H) Central Districts Stags; 147/8 (20 overs)	v	Canterbury Wizards; 141/6 (20 overs)
Peter Fulton 40 (27); Adam Milne 2/19 (3 overs)		George Worker 59 (54); Richard Sherlock 2/26 (4 overs)

Canterbury won by 6 runs
Saxton Oval, Nelson
Umpires: Evan Gray and Evan Watkin

- Canterbury won the toss and chose to bat.

10 December
17:00
Scorecard

Auckland Aces; 175/8 (20 overs)	v	Otago Volts (H); 116/3 (14.5 overs)
Colin Munro 66* (48); Ian Butler 2/27 (4 overs)		Craig Cumming 44* (35); Colin de Grandhomme 1/8 (0.5 overs)

Auckland won by 8 runs (D/L)
Queen's Park, Invercargill
Umpires: Gary Baxter and Derek Walker

- Otago won the toss and chose to field.
- Rain reduced Otago's target to 125 runs from 14.5 overs according to the Duckworth–Lewis method.

12 December
14:00
Scorecard

Auckland Aces; 155/6 (20 overs)	v	Canterbury Wizards (H); 154/5 (20 overs)
James Adams 45 (37); Carl Frauenstein 2/23 (4 overs)		Ryan ten Doeschate 51* (41); Andre Adams 1/25 (4 overs)

Auckland won by 1 run
Village Green, Christchurch
Umpires: Evan Gray and Evan Watkin

- Canterbury won the toss and chose to field.

12 December
14:00
Scorecard

(H) Otago Volts; 175/6 (20 overs)	v	Central Districts Stags; 178/3 (17.3 overs)
Derek de Boorder 38* (21); Michael Yardy 2/34 (4 overs)		Kieran Noema-Barnett 57* (18); Chris Nash 2/24 (4 overs)

Central Districts won by 7 wickets
Queen's Park, Invercargill
Umpires: Phil Jones and Derek Walker

- Central Districts won the toss and chose to field.

12 December
14:00
Scorecard

Northern Districts Knights; 201/6 (20 overs)	v	Wellington Firebirds (H); 147 (19.5 overs)
Peter McGlashan 66 (31); Ronald Karaitiana 2/40 (4 overs)		Luke Woodcock 25* (22); Bradley Scott 3/32 (3.5 overs)

Northern Districts won by 54 runs
Basin Reserve, Wellington
Umpires: Gary Baxter and Chris Gaffaney

- Northern Districts won the toss and chose to bat.

14 December
17:00
Scorecard

Auckland Aces; 125/5 (12 overs)	v	Wellington Firebirds (H); 123/5 (12 overs)
James Adams 32 (24); Grant Elliott 1/3 (1 over)		Grant Elliott 42* (22); Andre Adams 2/24 (3 overs)

Auckland won by 2 runs
Basin Reserve, Wellington
Umpires: Phil Jones and Tim Parlane

- Auckland won the toss and chose to bat.
- Rain reduced the match to 12 overs per side.

15 December
17:00
Scorecard

Otago Volts; 168/7 (20 overs)	v	Canterbury Wizards (H); 171/4 (19.1 overs)
Aaron Redmond 55 (41); Ryan ten Doeschate 2/29 (4 overs)		Rob Nicol 75 (54); Nick Beard 2/29 (4 overs)

Canterbury won by 6 wickets
Village Green, Christchurch
Umpires: Barry Frost and Evan Watkin

- Canterbury won the toss and chose to field.

17 December
18:00
Scorecard

Canterbury Wizards; 138/8 (18 overs)	v	Northern Districts Knights (H); 142/2 (13.3 overs)
Ryan ten Doeschate 35 (29); Tim Southee 3/23 (4 overs)		David Warner 52* (35); Rob Nicol 1/20 (2 overs)

Northern Districts won by 8 wickets
Seddon Park, Hamilton
Umpires: Barry Frost and Evan Gray

- Northern Districts won the toss and chose to field.
- Rain reduced the match to 18 overs per side.

18 December
14:00
Scorecard

(H) Auckland Aces; 15/0 (2.1 overs)	v	Otago Volts
Colin de Grandhomme 7* (4)

No result
Colin Maiden Park, Auckland
Umpires: Gary Baxter and Evan Gray

- Otago won the toss and chose to field.

19 December
14:00
Scorecard

(H) Auckland Aces	v	Wellington Firebirds

No result
Colin Maiden Park, Auckland
Umpires: Barry Frost and Phil Jones

- Match abandoned without a ball bowled.

19 December
14:00
Scorecard

Central Districts Stags; 73/8 (10 overs)	v	Canterbury Wizards (H); 70/9 (10 overs)
Michael Yardy 24 (20); Johan van der Wath 3/5 (2 overs)		Peter Fulton 18 (14); Michael Mason 3/12 (2 overs)

Central Districts won by 3 runs
Village Green, Christchurch
Umpires: Chris Gaffaney and Derek Walker

- Canterbury won the toss and chose to field.
- Rain reduced the match to 10 overs per side.

19 December
14:00
Scorecard

(H) Northern Districts Knights	v	Otago Volts

No result
Bay Oval, Mount Maunganui
Umpires: Evan Gray and Tim Parlane

- Match abandoned without a ball bowled.

21 December
17:00
Scorecard

(H) Auckland Aces; 180/8 (20 overs)	v	Canterbury Wizards; 168/9 (20 overs)
Colin de Grandhomme 37 (18); Ryan ten Doeschate 2/20 (3 overs)		Corey Anderson 44 (27); Kyle Mills 3/30 (4 overs)

Auckland won by 12 runs
Colin Maiden Park, Auckland
Umpires: Chris Gaffaney and Evan Gray

- Canterbury won the toss and chose to field.

21 December
18:00
Scorecard

Wellington Firebirds; 202/6 (20 overs)	v	Northern Districts Knights (H); 159 (18.5 overs)
Jesse Ryder 86 (47); Brent Arnel 2/39 (4 overs)		Herschelle Gibbs 50 (38); Ronald Karaitiana 4/27 (3.5 overs)

Wellington won by 43 runs
Seddon Park, Hamilton
Umpires: Barry Frost and Phil Jones

- Northern Districts won the toss and chose to field.

22 December
17:00
Scorecard

(H) Central Districts Stags	v	Otago Volts

No result
Puekura Park, New Plymouth
Umpires: Barry Frost and Evan Watkin

- Match abandoned without a ball bowled.

23 December
17:00
Scorecard

(H) Canterbury Wizards; 207/6 (20 overs)	v	Wellington Firebirds; 202/4 (20 overs)
Rob Nicol 85 (48); Ronald Karaitiana 4/45 (4 overs)		Luke Wright 64 (29); Carl Frauenstein 2/27 (4 overs)

Canterbury won by 5 runs
Aorangi Oval, Timaru
Umpires: Gary Baxter and Derek Walker

- Wellington won the toss and chose to field.

23 December
17:00
Scorecard

Northern Districts Knights; 110 (18.5 overs)	v	Central Districts Stags (H); 113/4 (17.3 overs)
Brad Wilson 37 (23); George Worker 3/18 (4 overs)		Ross Taylor 35* (29); Graeme Aldridge 2/20 (4 overs)

Central Districts won by 6 wickets
Puekura Park, New Plymouth
Umpires: Phil Jones and Evan Watkin

- Central Districts won the toss and chose to field.

27 December
14:00
Scorecard

(H) Northern Districts Knights; 135/8 (20 overs)	v	Auckland Aces; 136/2 (18.3 overs)
Daniel Flynn 37 (25); Daryl Tuffey 2/21 (4 overs)		Lou Vincent 77 (61); Trent Boult 1/12 (2 overs)

Auckland won by 8 wickets
Bay Oval, Mount Maunganui
Umpires: Evan Gray and Phil Jones

- Northern Districts won the toss and chose to bat.

27 December
14:00
Scorecard

(H) Otago Volts	v	Canterbury Wizards

No result
Village Green, Christchurch
Umpires: Tim Parlane and Evan Watkin

- Match abandoned without a ball bowled.

27 December
14:00
Scorecard

Central Districts Stags; 192/8 (20 overs)	v	Wellington Firebirds (H); 163/6 (20 overs)
Jamie How 96 (42); Jeetan Patel 4/27 (4 overs)		Grant Elliott 30 (20); Ian Blackwell 3/19 (4 overs)

Central Districts won by 29 runs
Basin Reserve, Wellington
Umpires: Peter Gasston and Derek Walker

- Wellington won the toss and chose to field.

29 December
14:00
Scorecard

(H) Canterbury Wizards; 163/5 (20 overs)	v	Northern Districts Knights; 103 (18 overs)
Peter Fulton 64 (46); Bradley Scott 3/20 (4 overs)		BJ Watling 20 (19); Johan van der Wath 3/12 (4 overs)

Canterbury won by 60 runs
Village Green, Christchurch
Umpires: Wayne Knights and Derek Walker

- Northern Districts won the toss and chose to field.

29 December
14:00
Scorecard

Auckland Aces; 180/7 (20 overs)	v	Central Districts Stags (H); 183/2 (16.5 overs)
Rob Quiney 55 (29); Michael Yardy 2/18 (4 overs)		Ian Blackwell 68* (33); Roneel Hira 1/28 (3 overs)

Central Districts won by 8 wickets
Puekura Park, New Plymouth
Umpires: Evan Gray and Phil Jones

- Auckland won the toss and chose to bat.

29 December
14:00
Scorecard

(H) Otago Volts; 147/8 (20 overs)	v	Wellington Firebirds; 148/7 (19.5 overs)
Aaron Redmond 50 (37); Harry Boam 2/16 (3 overs)		Neal Parlane 34 (29); Aaron Redmond 2/15 (2 overs)

Wellington won by 3 wickets
Queenstown Events Centre
Umpires: Tim Parlane and Evan Watkin

- Wellington won the toss and chose to field.

== Final ==
2 January
14:00
Scorecard

(H) Auckland Aces; 158/8 (20 overs)	v	Central Districts Stags; 154/9 (20 overs)
James Adams 62 (43); Michael Mason 3/24 (4 overs)		Ross Taylor 44 (42); Michael Bates 4/18 (4 overs)

Auckland won by 4 runs
Colin Maiden Park, Auckland
Umpires: Gary Baxter and Tim Parlane

- Auckland won the toss and chose to bat.
