= Australian cricket team in New Zealand in 2009–10 =

Australian cricket team in New Zealand in 2010
	New Zealand	Australia
- Dates: 26 February – 31 March 2010
Captains	Daniel Vettori; Ross Taylor (First ODI)	Ricky Ponting; Michael Clarke (Twenty20)

Test series
- Result: Australia won the 2-match series 2–0
Most runs	Ross Taylor (206)	Simon Katich (291)
Most wickets	Daniel Vettori (7)	Doug Bollinger & Mitchell Johnson (12)

One Day International series
- Results: Australia won the 5-match series 3–2
Most runs	Scott Styris (199)	Michael Hussey (198)
Most wickets	Shane Bond (9)	Mitchell Johnson (12)

Twenty20 International series
- Results: 2-match series drawn 1–1
Most runs	Brendon McCullum (118)	Michael Clarke (85)
Most wickets	Shane Bond (3)	Shaun Tait (4)

The Australian cricket team toured New Zealand from 26 February to 31 March 2010. The tour consisted of two Twenty20s (T20), five One Day Internationals (ODIs) and two Tests. Due to sponsorship, the tour was referred to as The National Bank Series, with the New Zealand team's major sponsor the National Bank of New Zealand, and the Australian team's major sponsor Victoria Bitter.

The T20 series was tied, with each team winning one of the matches. The Chappell–Hadlee Trophy—awarded to the winner of the annual series of ODI matches between the two nations—was retained by Australia for the third series in a row by defeating New Zealand 3–2. The Trans-Tasman Trophy—awarded to the winner of each test series between Australia and New Zealand—was retained by Australia for the eighth series in a row, after they defeated New Zealand 2–0.

The next series for both teams was the 2010 World Twenty20 in April and May.

== Squads ==
Twenty20 squads		ODI squads		Test squads
New Zealand	Australia	New Zealand	Australia	New Zealand	Australia
Daniel Vettori (c)	Michael Clarke (c)	Daniel Vettori (c)	Ricky Ponting (c)	Daniel Vettori (c)	Ricky Ponting (c)
Shane Bond	Cameron White (vc)	Shane Bond	Michael Clarke (vc) (Note: Michael Clarke was originally selected for the Australian ODI squad, but withdrew himself from the tour for personal reasons before the third match. George Bailey was added to the squad as a replacement.)	Brent Arnel	Michael Clarke (vc)
James Franklin	Travis Birt	Neil Broom	George Bailey	James Franklin (Note: James Franklin was not in the New Zealand Test squad for the first match, but was added for the second.)	Doug Bollinger
Martin Guptill	Daniel Christian	James Franklin	Doug Bollinger	Martin Guptill	Brad Haddin(wk)
Gareth Hopkins (wk)	Brad Haddin (wk)	Martin Guptill	Brad Haddin (wk)	Peter Ingram	Ryan Harris
Peter Ingram	Ryan Harris	Gareth Hopkins (wk)	Ryan Harris	Brendon McCullum (wk)	Nathan Hauritz
Brendon McCullum (wk)	Nathan Hauritz	Peter Ingram	Nathan Hauritz	Tim McIntosh	Phillip Hughes
Nathan McCullum	David Hussey	Brendon McCullum (wk)	James Hopes	Chris Martin	Michael Hussey
Jacob Oram	Michael Hussey	Nathan McCullum	Michael Hussey	Jeetan Patel	Mitchell Johnson
Tim Southee	Mitchell Johnson	Michael Mason (Note: Michael Mason was not in the New Zealand ODI squad for the first two matches, but was added for the remaining three.)	Mitchell Johnson	Mathew Sinclair	Simon Katich
Ross Taylor	Shaun Marsh (Note: Shaun Marsh was originally selected for the Australian T20 & ODI squads, but was ruled out through injury and withdrawn.)	Jacob Oram (Note: Jacob Oram was selected for the New Zealand ODI squad for the first two matches, but was ruled out through injury for the remaining three.)	Clint McKay	Tim Southee	Clint McKay
Daryl Tuffey	Dirk Nannes	Tim Southee	Shaun Marsh	Ross Taylor	Marcus North
	Steve Smith	Shanan Stewart (Note: Shanan Stewart was not in the New Zealand ODI squad for the first two matches, but was added for the remaining three.)	Adam Voges	Daryl Tuffey (Note: Daryl Tuffey was selected for the New Zealand Test squad for the first match, but was ruled out through injury for the second.)	Steve Smith
	Shaun Tait	Scott Styris	Shane Watson	BJ Watling	Shane Watson
	David Warner	Ross Taylor	Cameron White	Kane Williamson (Note: Kane Williamson was not in the New Zealand Test squad for the first match, but was added for the second.)
	Shane Watson	Daryl Tuffey

== T20I series ==
=== 1st T20I ===
26 February 2010
19:00 (N)
Scorecard

New Zealand; 118 (20 overs)	v	Australia; 4/119 (16 overs)
James Franklin 43 (42); Mitchell Johnson 3/19 (4 overs)		David Hussey 46 (36); Shane Bond 2/32 (4 overs)

Australia won by 6 wickets
Wellington Regional Stadium, Wellington, New Zealand
Attendance: 21,364
Umpires: Gary Baxter (NZ) and Billy Bowden (NZ)
Player of the match: Mitchell Johnson (Aus)

- New Zealand won the toss and elected to bat.

=== 2nd T20I ===
28 February 2010
18:00 (N)
Scorecard

New Zealand; 6/214 (20 overs)	v	Australia; 4/214 (20 overs)
Brendon McCullum 116* (56); Shaun Tait 2/40 (4 overs)		Michael Clarke 67 (45); James Franklin 2/32 (3 overs)

Match tied; New Zealand won the Super Over
Lancaster Park, Christchurch, New Zealand
Attendance: 26,148
Umpires: Chris Gaffaney (NZ) and Tony Hill (NZ)
Player of the match: Brendon McCullum (NZ)

- New Zealand won the toss and elected to bat.
- This was the second cricket match with Super Over after match ended a tie.

Both of these T20I matches were preceded by WT20I matches between the New Zealand and Australian women's teams. These women's matches were played at the same venues as the men's matches.

== Chappell–Hadlee Trophy ==
=== 1st ODI ===
3 March 2010
14:00 (D/N)
Scorecard

Australia; 8/275 (50 overs)	v	New Zealand; 8/281 (49.2 overs)
Michael Hussey 59 (59); Daryl Tuffey 3/58 (10 overs)		Ross Taylor 70 (71); DE Bollinger 2/58 (9.2 overs)

New Zealand won by 2 wickets
McLean Park, Napier, New Zealand
Attendance: 8,527
Umpires: Tony Hill (NZ) and Rudi Koertzen (SA)
Player of the match: Ross Taylor (NZ)

- Australia won the toss and elected to bat.

=== 2nd ODI ===
6 March 2010
12:00
Scorecard

Australia; 7/273 (50 overs)	v	New Zealand; 253 (43.2 overs)
Michael Hussey 56 (63); Shane Bond 2/42 (10 overs)		Daniel Vettori 70 (49); Mitchell Johnson 4/51 (9 overs)

Australia won by 12 runs (D/L method)
Eden Park, Auckland, New Zealand
Attendance: 13,500
Umpires: Billy Bowden (NZ) and Rudi Koertzen (SA)
Player of the match: Daniel Vettori (NZ)

- Australia won the toss and elected to bat.
- A rain delay after 8.4 overs in the New Zealand innings reduced the target to 266 runs off 45 overs.

=== 3rd ODI ===
9 March 2010
14:00 (D/N)
Scorecard

New Zealand; 245 (46.2 overs)	v	Australia; 4/248 (47.2 overs)
Ross Taylor 62 (90); Mitchell Johnson 3/41 (9.2 overs)		Brad Haddin 110 (121); Daniel Vettori 1/36 (10 overs)

Australia won by 6 wickets
Seddon Park, Hamilton, New Zealand
Attendance: 10,550
Umpires: Asad Rauf (Pak) and Billy Bowden (NZ)
Player of the match: Brad Haddin (Aus)

- Australia won the toss and elected to field.

=== 4th ODI ===
11 March 2010
14:00 (D/N)
Scorecard

New Zealand; 238 (44.1 overs)	v	Australia; 4/202 (31.1 overs)
Brendon McCullum 61 (75); Nathan Hauritz 3/46 (8 overs)		Cameron White 50* (57); Daniel Vettori 2/29 (7 overs)

Australia won by 6 wickets (D/L method)
Eden Park, Auckland, New Zealand
Attendance: 11,265
Umpires: Asad Rauf (Pak) and Gary Baxter (NZ)
Player of the match: Cameron White (Aus)

- Australia won the toss and elected to field.
- A rain delay during the innings break reduced the Australian target to 200 runs off 34 overs.
- Shanan Stewart made his ODI debut.

=== 5th ODI ===
13 March 2010
14:00 (D/N)
Scorecard

New Zealand; 9/241 (50 overs)	v	Australia; 190 (46.1 overs)
Scott Styris 55 (66); Mitchell Johnson 2/42 (10 overs)		Shane Watson 53 (79); Shane Bond 4/26 (9.1 overs)

New Zealand won by 51 runs
Wellington Regional Stadium, Wellington, New Zealand
Attendance: 11,587
Umpires: Asad Rauf (Pak) and Gary Baxter (NZ)
Player of the match: Tim Southee (NZ)

- Australia won the toss and elected to field.

== Trans–Tasman Trophy ==
=== 1st Test ===
19–23 March 2010
Scorecard

Australia	v	New Zealand
459/5d (131 overs); Michael Clarke 168 (253); Brent Arnel 2/89 (26 overs)		157 (59.1 overs); Daniel Vettori 46 (71); Doug Bollinger 5/28 (13 overs)
106/0 (23 overs); Phillip Hughes 86* (75)		407 (f/o) (134.5 overs); Brendon McCullum 104 (187); Ryan Harris 4/77 (24 overs)

Australia won by 10 wickets
Basin Reserve, Wellington, New Zealand
Umpires: Asad Rauf (Pak) and Ian Gould (Eng)
Player of the match: Michael Clarke (Aus)

- Australia won the toss and elected to bat.
- Rain interrupted play on Day 4.
- Ryan Harris (Aus) and Brent Arnel (NZ) both made their Test debuts.

=== 2nd Test ===
27–31 March 2010
Scorecard

Australia	v	New Zealand
231 (74.3 overs); Simon Katich 88 (171); Daniel Vettori 4/36 (19.3 overs)		264 (63.3 overs); Ross Taylor 138 (104); Mitchell Johnson 4/59 (16 overs)
511/8d (153 overs); Simon Katich 106 (279); Brent Arnel 3/77 (26 overs)		302 (91.1 overs); Martin Guptill 58 (157); Mitchell Johnson 6/73 (20.1 overs)

Australia won by 176 runs
Seddon Park, Hamilton, New Zealand
Umpires: Aleem Dar (Pak) and Asad Rauf (Pak)
Player of the match: Mitchell Johnson (Aus)

- Australia won the toss and elected to bat.
- Bad light interrupted play on Day 2.
- Daniel Vettori (NZ) played in his 100th Test.

== Media coverage ==
=== Television ===
- Sky Sport (Live) – New Zealand
- FOX Sports (Live) – Australia
- SET Max (Live) – India (Except 5th ODI)
- SET Pix (Live) – India (Only 5th ODI)
- Sky Sports (Live) – United Kingdom and Ireland
- DirecTV (Live) – United States of America
- Supersport (Live) – South Africa, Kenya and Zimbabwe
- Arab Digital Distribution (Live) – United Arab Emirates
