= Sri Lankan cricket team in New Zealand in 2006–07 =

Sri Lankans in New Zealand in 2006–07
	Sri Lanka	New Zealand
- Dates: 30 November 2006 – 9 January 2007
Captains	Mahela Jayawardene	Stephen Fleming

Test series
- Result: 2-match series drawn 1–1
Most runs	Kumar Sangakkara (268); Chamara Silva (213)	Craig Cumming (119); Daniel Vettori (114)
Most wickets	Muttiah Muralitharan (17); Lasith Malinga (9)	Daniel Vettori (10); Shane Bond (10)

One Day International series
- Results: 5-match series drawn 2–2
Most runs	Kumar Sangakkara (219); Sanath Jayasuriya (182)	Ross Taylor (143); Nathan Astle (83)
Most wickets	Muttiah Muralitharan (7); Chaminda Vaas (7)	Michael Mason (6); Mark Gillespie (5)

The Sri Lankan cricket team toured New Zealand for cricket matches during the 2006–07 cricket season. It was the third successive season Sri Lanka visited New Zealand, after the 2005–06 tour was aborted and reschuled for the winter of 2005–06. Originally, the tour had been set to include three Tests and five One Day Internationals, but New Zealand Cricket chief executive Martin Snedden announced in June that one of the Tests would be replaced with two Twenty20 Internationals.

Sri Lanka lost their ODI series 1–4 and the Test series 0–2 the last time they visited New Zealand, but beat New Zealand at the 2006 Champions Trophy. However, that was their only victory in the group stage, as New Zealand progressed from the group. On the ICC Test Championship tables, Sri Lanka were ranked two places ahead of New Zealand, but New Zealand were ranked third on the ODI tables, three places ahead of Sri Lanka.

== Schedule ==
The schedule was announced on 22 June.

No.	Date	Venue
First class cricket
Tour v Otago	30 Nov, 1,2,3 Dec 2006	University Oval
1st Test	7, 8, 9, 10, 11 Dec 2006	Jade Stadium
2nd Test	15, 16, 17, 18, 19 Dec 2006	Basin Reserve
Twenty20 International Series
1st T20I	22 Dec 2006	Westpac Stadium
2nd T20I	26 Dec 2006	Eden Park
One-day International Series
1st ODI	28 Dec 2006	McLean Park
2nd ODI	31 Dec 2006	Queenstown Events Centre
3rd ODI	2 Jan 2007	Jade Stadium
4th ODI	6 Jan 2007	Eden Park
5th ODI	9 Jan 2007	Seddon Park

== Squads ==
Sri Lanka
Mahela Jayawardene c	RHB, RM	Sinhalese SC
Prasanna Jayawardene wk	RHB	Sebastianites C&AC
Kumar Sangakkara wk	LHB	Nondescripts CC
Marvan Atapattu	RHB, LB	Sinhalese SC
Malinga Bandara	RHB, LBG	Ragama CC
Tillakaratne Dilshan	RHB, OB	Bloomfield C&AC
Dilhara Fernando	RHB, RFM	Sinhalese SC
Akalanka Ganegama	RHB, RFM	Nondescripts CC
Sanath Jayasuriya	LHB, SLA	Bloomfield C&AC
Chamara Kapugedera	RHB, RM	Colombo CC
Farveez Maharoof	RHB, RFM	Bloomfield C&AC
Lasith Malinga	RHB, RM	Nondescripts CC
Muttiah Muralitharan	RHB, OB	Tamil Union C&AC
Ruchira Perera	LHB, LMF	Colts CC
Chamara Silva	RHB, LB	Sebastianites C&AC
Upul Tharanga	LHB	Nondescripts CC
Chaminda Vaas	LHB, LFM	Colts CC
Ganegama and Prasanna Jayawardene returned home after the Tests. Atapattu, Bandara and Perera were added to the squads for the one-day matches.

New Zealand
Stephen Fleming c	LHB	Wellington
Brendon McCullum wk	RHB	Canterbury
Nathan Astle	RHB, RM	Canterbury
Shane Bond	RHB, RF	Canterbury
Craig Cumming	RHB	Otago
James Franklin	LHB, LFM	Wellington
Jamie How	RHB, RM	Central Districts
Michael Mason	RHB, RFM	Central Districts
Chris Martin	RHB, RFM	Auckland
Iain O'Brien	RHB, RM	Wellington
Jacob Oram	LHB, RM	Central Districts
Mathew Sinclair	RHB, RM	Central Districts
Daniel Vettori	LHB, SLA	Northern Districts
Mason missed the first Test due to injury.

== Tour match ==
=== 4-day match: Sri Lankans v Otago ===
Match drawn

At Dunedin, Sri Lanka passed 400 twice, with Upul Tharanga making the highest score of the match with 108 in the third innings. For Otago, Jordan Sheed, Craig Cumming and Aaron Redmond all passed 50, and the remaining eight batsmen contributed 86 runs to the total in the first innings. Lasith Malinga took three wickets, with wicket-keeper Gareth Hopkins the highest-batting, and no-balled 11 times.

== Test series ==
=== 1st Test ===
7–9 December 2006

Sri Lanka	v	New Zealand
154 (52.4 overs); CK Kapugedera 37 (86); JEC Franklin 12-0-30-3		206 (85.4 overs); DL Vettori 63 (114); M Muralitharan 34-7-65-4
170 (53.1 overs); KC Sangakkara 100* (154); SE Bond 19.1-5-63-4		119/5 (33 overs); CD Cumming 43 (57); M Muralitharan 14-5-34-3

New Zealand won by 5 wickets
Jade Stadium, Christchurch, New Zealand
Umpires: BG Jerling (RSA) and SJA Taufel (AUS)
Player of the match: SE Bond (NZ)

Shane Bond took three wickets in his first six overs in his first Test match for a year, and Sri Lanka were bowled out for 154 with only Tharanga and Chamara Kapugedera passing 20. In reply, New Zealand trailed by 41 with six wickets in hand, but Daniel Vettori's half-century helped score 206 against a Muttiah Muralitharan-led bowling attack. Murali took four for 65 from 34 overs, while Chaminda Vaas took two wickets in an over and ended with three for 49. The second time around, Kumar Sangakkara made an unbeaten century from number three, out of a total of 170. After completing an easy single to complete Sangakkara's century Muralitharan walked down the pitch to celebrate while the ball was being returned to the wicketkeeper. McCullum then appealed for a runout and Muralitharan was dismissed, ending Sri Lanka's second innings. After the match Jayawardene expressed the Sri Lankan team's disappointment about the incident, saying it was contrary to the spirit of the game, but Fleming and McCullum were unrepentant. New Zealand managed to reach the modest target of 118 to win the game, despite a mini-collapse.

=== 2nd Test ===
15–19 December 2006

Sri Lanka	v	New Zealand
268 (65 overs); KC Sangakkara 156* (192); CS Martin 13-2-50-3		130 (39.1 overs); BB McCullum 43 (61); SL Malinga 18-4-68-5
365 (109.3 overs); LPC Silva 152* (219); DL Vettori 42.3-6-130-7		286 (85.1 overs); DL Vettori 51 (68); M Muralitharan 34.1-9-87-6

Sri Lanka won by 217 runs
Basin Reserve, Wellington, New Zealand
Umpires: BG Jerling (RSA) and SJA Taufel (AUS)
Player of the match: LPC Silva (SRL)

Kumar Sangakkara and Chamara Silva put on a stand of 121 runs to lift the Sri Lankans to a score of 268 in their first innings after Jayawardene chose to bat. Sangakkara hit 21 4s and one 6 on his way to 156 not out, while Silva scored 61 runs. The only other player for Sri Lanka to get into double figures was Prasanna Jayawardene, while 5 of their players didn't manage to trouble the scorers. At the end of the first day, New Zealand in reply were 64 for 4, still 204 runs behind with Malinga taking 3 scalps.

On the second day, Muralitharan and Malinga shared the remaining 6 wickets of the New Zealand innings, as they were bowled out for 130 before lunch. The second Sri Lankan innings started off shaky, with their first three wickets, including the in-form Sangakkara falling with just 62 runs on the board. Chamara Silva then came to the crease and helped the Sri Lankans to 255 for 5 at the end of the day, with Silva getting to 79 not out at stumps.

The third day belonged to Sri Lanka once more, with Silva reaching 152 not out by the end of the innings, and Chaminda Vaas chipping in with a well made 47. Needing an unlikely 504 runs to win the match, New Zealand lost their openers with just 60 runs scored. On the fourth and final day, the New Zealanders lost five quick wickets falling to 163 for 7, before Vettori and Franklin shared a partnership of 96. After Vettori got out, the New Zealand team lost their way and finished with 286. Sri Lanka won by 217 runs to level the test series 1-1. The player of the match was Chamara Silva after scoring 213 runs in the match.

== T20 international series ==
=== 1st T20I ===
22 December 2006 (D/N)
Scorecard

New Zealand; 162/8 (20 overs)	v	Sri Lanka; 62/1 (5.5 overs)
BB McCullum 39 (22); ST Jayasuriya 3/21 (4 overs)		ST Jayasuriya 51* (23); SE Bond 1/24 (3 overs)

Sri Lanka won by 18 runs (D/L method)
Westpac Stadium, Wellington
Umpires: AL Hill (NZ) and EA Watkin (NZ)
Player of the match: ST Jayasuriya (SL)

- New Zealand won the toss and elected to bat.
- When play was halted Sri Lanka needed to have scored 45 runs to win
- LRPL Taylor, PD McGlashan, MR Gillespie (all NZ), MS Atapattu, LPC Silva, WPUJC Vaas, M Muralitharan (all SL) made their T20I debuts.

=== 2nd T20I ===
26 December 2006
Scorecard

Sri Lanka; 115 (18.2 overs)	v	New Zealand; 116/5 (18.3 overs)
SL Malinga 27 (19); JEC Franklin 3/23 (4 overs)		NJ Astle 40* (37); CRD Fernando 3/19 (4 overs)

New Zealand won by 5 wickets
Eden Park, Auckland
Umpires: BF Bowden (NZ) and AL Hill (NZ)
Player of the match: JEC Franklin (NZ)

- New Zealand won the toss and elected to field.

== ODI series ==
=== 1st ODI ===
28 December 2006
Scorecard

New Zealand; 285/8 (50 overs)	v	Sri Lanka; 289/3 (40 overs)
LRPL Taylor 128* (133); WPUJC Vaas 3/50 (10 overs)		ST Jayasuriya 111 (82); JEC Franklin 2/69 (10 overs)

Sri Lanka won by 7 wickets
McLean Park, Napier
Umpires: SJ Davis (AUS) and AL Hill (NZ)
Player of the match: ST Jayasuriya (SL)

- New Zealand won the toss and elected to bat
- MR Gillespie (NZ) made his ODI debut

=== 2nd ODI ===
31 December 2006
Scorecard

Sri Lanka; 224/7 (50 overs)	v	New Zealand; 228/9 (50 overs)
KC Sangakkara 89 (122); MR Gillespie 2/46 (10 overs)		JAH Marshall 50 (80); M Muralitharan 3/31 (10 overs)

New Zealand won by 1 wicket
Queenstown Events Centre, Queenstown
Umpires: GAV Baxter (NZ) and SJ Davis (AUS)
Player of the match: JEC Franklin (NZ)

- New Zealand won the toss and elected to field

=== 3rd ODI ===
2 January 2007
Scorecard

Sri Lanka; 112 (35.2 overs)	v	New Zealand; 110/6 (24.3 overs)
MS Atapattu 28 (26); MJ Mason 4/24 (9 overs)		PG Fulton 43* (57); CRD Fernando 2/34 (6.3 overs)

New Zealand won by 4 wickets (D/L method)
Jade Stadium, Christchurch
Umpires: SJ Davis (AUS) and AL Hill (NZ)
Player of the match: MJ Mason (NZ)

- New Zealand won the toss and elected to field
- The match was reduced to 46 overs per side, New Zealand target was 110 runs

=== 4th ODI ===
6 January 2007 (D/N)
Scorecard

Sri Lanka; 262/6 (50 overs)	v	New Zealand; 73 (26.3 overs)
KC Sangakkara 79 (103); MR Gillespie 3/39 (10 overs)		CD McMillan 29* (64); WPUJC Vaas 3/10 (8 overs)

Sri Lanka won by 189 runs
Eden Park, Auckland
Umpires: GAV Baxter (NZ) and SJ Davis (AUS)
Player of the match: ST Jayasuriya (SL)

- Sri Lanka won the toss and elected to bat

=== 5th ODI ===
9 January 2007 (D/N)
Scorecard

Sri Lanka	v	New Zealand

Match abandoned
Seddon Park, Hamilton
Umpires: BF Bowden (NZ) and SJ Davis (AUS)

- New Zealand won the toss and elected to field
- Under ICC regulations, this counts as a match played since the toss was made
