= Zimbabwean cricket team in New Zealand in 2011–12 =

Zimbabwean cricket team in New Zealand in 2012
	Zimbabwe	New Zealand
- Dates: 26 January 2012 – 14 February 2012
Captains	Brendan Taylor	Ross Taylor

Test series
- Result: New Zealand won the 1-match series 1–0
Most runs	Regis Chakabva (66)	Ross Taylor (122)
Most wickets	Chris Martin (8)	Graeme Cremer (2)
- Player of the series: Chris Martin (NZL)

One Day International series
- Results: New Zealand won the 3-match series 3–0
Most runs	Brendan Taylor (127)	Martin Guptill (232)
Most wickets	Shingirai Masakadza (5)	Rob Nicol (5); Kyle Mills (5)

Twenty20 International series
- Results: New Zealand won the 2-match series 2–0
Most runs	Hamilton Masakadza (115)	Martin Guptill (91)
Most wickets	Kyle Jarvis (4)	Michael Bates (4)

The Zimbabwean cricket team toured New Zealand from 26 January to 14 February 2012. The tour consisted of one Test, three One Day Internationals (ODIs) and two Twenty20 (T20) matches.

New Zealand won the tour's sole Test in Napier by an innings and 301 runs, setting new records for New Zealand's largest Test victory and Zimbabwe's biggest Test defeat. New Zealand won the ODI series 3–0, and the T20I series 2–0.

The second ODI was the first international match played in Whangārei, held at Cobham Oval.

== Background ==
For Zimbabwe, captained by Brendan Taylor the one-off Test was their first overseas since returning from their five-year absence from Test cricket. New Zealand, led by Ross Taylor, entered the Test as the eighth-ranked Test team by the International Cricket Council. Their most recent Test series had been a 1–1 draw in Australia.

== Squads ==
Tests						ODIs	T20Is
New Zealand	Zimbabwe	New Zealand	Zimbabwe	New Zealand	Zimbabwe		
Ross Taylor (c); Trent Boult; Doug Bracewell; Dean Brownlie; Martin Guptill; Chris Martin; Brendon McCullum (wk); Tim Southee; Daniel Vettori; Kruger van Wyk (wk); BJ Watling (wk); Kane Williamson; Sam Wells	Brendan Taylor (c); Regis Chakabva; Elton Chigumbura; Graeme Cremer; Kyle Jarvis; Hamilton Masakadza; Shingirai Masakadza; Stuart Matsikenyeri; Tino Mawoyo; Keegan Meth; Forster Mutizwa; Ray Price; Tatenda Taibu (wk); Brian Vitori; Malcolm Waller	Brendon McCullum (c & wk); Michael Bates; Doug Bracewell; Dean Brownlie; Martin Guptill; Andrew Ellis; Nathan McCullum; Tim Southee; Kyle Mills; Rob Nicol; Jacob Oram; Kane Williamson; Tom Latham (wk); Tarun Nethula	Brendan Taylor (c); Regis Chakabva; Elton Chigumbura; Kyle Jarvis; Hamilton Masakadza; Shingirai Masakadza; Stuart Matsikenyeri; Tino Mawoyo; Keegan Meth; Forster Mutizwa; Ray Price; Tatenda Taibu (wk); Prosper Utseya; Brian Vitori; Malcolm Waller	Brendon McCullum (c & wk); Michael Bates; Doug Bracewell; Dean Brownlie; Martin Guptill; Colin de Grandhomme; Nathan McCullum; Tim Southee; Kyle Mills; Rob Nicol; Jacob Oram; Kane Williamson; Ronnie Hira; James Franklin	Brendan Taylor (c); Regis Chakabva; Elton Chigumbura; Kyle Jarvis; Hamilton Masakadza; Shingirai Masakadza; Stuart Matsikenyeri; Tino Mawoyo; Keegan Meth; Forster Mutizwa; Ray Price; Tatenda Taibu (wk); Prosper Utseya; Brian Vitori; Malcolm Waller		

== Tour Matches ==
=== Three-day: New Zealand XI v Zimbabweans ===
21–23 January
Scorecard

New Zealand XI	v	Zimbabweans
272/7d (73.5 overs); BJ Watling 84 (181); Shingirai Masakadza 2/36 (11 overs)		329 (107 overs); Regis Chakabva 87* (148); Neil Wagner 3/86 (19 overs)
274/5 (62 overs); Kruger van Wyk 61(74); Graeme Cremer 1/56 (12 overs)

Match drawn
Harry Barker Reserve, Gisborne
Umpires: Barry Frost (New Zealand) and Tim Parlane (New Zealand)

- New Zealand XI won the toss and chose to bat

== Test series ==
=== Only Test ===
26–28 January
Scorecard

New Zealand	v	Zimbabwe
495/7d (123.4 overs); Ross Taylor 122 (201); Graeme Cremer 2/112 (22 overs)		51 (28.5 overs); Malcolm Waller 23 (42); Chris Martin 2/5 (6 overs)
		143 (48.3 overs) (f/o); Regis Chakabva 63 (119); Chris Martin 6/26 (8.3 overs)

New Zealand won by an innings and 301 runs
McLean Park, Napier
Umpires: Enamul Haque (Ban) and Rod Tucker (Aus)
Player of the match: Chris Martin

- Zimbabwe won the toss and elected to field.
- Play on Day 2 ended early due to rain.
- Test debuts: Shingi Masakadza and Forster Mutizwa (both Zimbabwe)
- Zimbabwe's first innings total of 51 is their lowest total in Tests.
- Zimbabwe's first innings total of 51 is the lowest score made against New Zealand by any nation.

Day 1

Zimbabwe won the toss and put New Zealand into bat. Ross Taylor made an unbeaten sixth Test hundred just before stumps on day one. New Zealand collected 331 runs for the loss of five wickets, with half-centuries to Brendon McCullum (83) and Martin Guptill (51) helping set up a strong total. Playing their first away Test since the Centurion in March 2005, Zimbabwe's seamers failed to exploit favourable early conditions. Ross Taylor made a century and New Zealand was 5/331 at stumps.

Day 2

Only 15.2 overs were bowled on the second day of the Test at McLean Park before light, but persistent, rain set in to make further play impossible. Ross Taylor retired hurt on 122*, and BJ Watling made unbeaten fifty, his second in Test cricket, as New Zealand was 5/392 at stumps.

Day 3

New Zealand added another 103 runs in the first hour of play. After Watling (102*) made his first career century, New Zealand declared at drinks for 7dec/495.

The New Zealand bowlers decimated the Zimbabwean batting line-up in its first innings. Zimbabwe was reduced to 5/20 at lunch, and dismissed for 51 in the 29th over, with Malcolm Waller (23) the only Zimbabwean to reach double figures. The New Zealand bowlers shared the wickets, with all four fast bowlers (Martin, Southee, Bracewell and Boult) claiming two wickets each. Leading by 444 runs, New Zealand enforced the follow-on.

The second innings started no better, as Zimbabwe was reduced to 5/12 shortly after tea, with Chris Martin taking three early wickets. Zimbabwe finally managed to compile some partnerships in the lower order, with Regis Chakabva (63) and Graeme Cremer (26) adding 63 for the seventh wicket. New Zealand ultimately dismissed Zimbabwe again inside extended play at the end of the day, for a score of 143. Chris Martin (6/26) and Doug Bracewell (3/26) were the leading bowlers in the second innings, and Martin was named man of the match, with match figures of 8/31.

Records

Zimbabwe's first innings total of 51 set a new record for Zimbabwe's lowest completed innings total, breaking the previous mark of 54 set against South Africa in Cape Town in 2005, and was the lowest innings total ever conceded by New Zealand, breaking the previous mark of 59 which was also set against Zimbabwe in 2005 in Harare. The margin of an innings and 301 runs set a new record for the largest win in New Zealand's history, and the heaviest defeat in Zimbabwe's history,; in both cases, the previous record was an innings and 294 runs, set in that same 2005 match in Harare. It was only the third occasion of a team being twice bowled out inside a single day of a Test match, and the second time New Zealand had done it to Zimbabwe, the feat being previously achieved in the 2005 Harare Test.

== ODI series ==
=== 1st ODI ===
3 February
Scorecard

New Zealand; 248 (48.3 overs)	v	Zimbabwe; 158 (41.1 overs)
Martin Guptill 70 (66); Shingi Masakadza 4/46 (9.3 overs)		Brendan Taylor 58 (68); Rob Nicol 4/19 (4.1 overs)

New Zealand won by 90 runs
University Oval, Dunedin
Umpires: Enamul Haque (Ban) and Chris Gaffaney (NZ)
Player of the match: Martin Guptill (NZ)

- Zimbabwe won the toss and elected to field.
- ODI debuts: Dean Brownlie, Andrew Ellis and Tom Latham (New Zealand)

=== 2nd ODI ===
6 February
Scorecard

New Zealand; 372/6 (50 overs)	v	Zimbabwe; 231/8 (50 overs)
Rob Nicol 146 (134); Prosper Utseya 3/71 (10 overs)		Elton Chigumbura 63 (69); Jacob Oram 3/29 (10 overs)

New Zealand won by 141 runs
Cobham Oval, Whangārei
Umpires: Tony Hill (NZ) and Rod Tucker (Aus)
Player of the match: Rob Nicol (NZ)

- Zimbabwe won the toss and elected to field.
- ODI debut: Tarun Nethula (New Zealand)
- This is the first-ever One-Day International at the Cobham Oval in Whangārei, after it received approval from the ICC.

=== 3rd ODI ===
9 February
Scorecard

New Zealand; 373/8 (50 overs)	v	Zimbabwe; 171 (44 overs)
Brendon McCullum 119 (88); Kyle Jarvis 2/58 (9 overs)		Brendan Taylor 65 (62); Kane Williamson 2/13 (3 overs)

New Zealand won by 202 runs
McLean Park, Napier
Umpires: Gary Baxter (NZ) and Enamul Haque (Ban)
Player of the match: Brendon McCullum (NZ)

- New Zealand won the toss and elected to bat.
- ODI debut Michael Bates (New Zealand)
- Ray Price (Zimbabwe) played his last ODI match.

== Twenty20 series ==
=== 1st T20I ===
11 February
Scorecard

Zimbabwe; 159/8 (20)	v	New Zealand; 160/3 (16.5)
Hamilton Masakadza 53 (36); Michael Bates 3/31 (4 overs)		Martin Guptill 91* (54); Kyle Jarvis 2/32 (3 overs)

New Zealand won by 7 wickets
Eden Park, Auckland
Umpires: Gary Baxter and Barry Frost (both NZ)
Player of the match: Martin Guptill (NZ)

- Zimbabwe won the toss and elected to bat.

T20I debut Colin de Grandhomme (NZ)

=== 2nd T20I ===
14 February
Scorecard

Zimbabwe; 200/2 (20 overs)	v	New Zealand; 202/5 (19.4 overs)
Brendan Taylor 75* (43); Elton Chigumbura 2/23 (3 overs)		James Franklin 60 (37); Ronnie Hira 1/31 (3 overs)

New Zealand won by 5 wickets
Seddon Park, Hamilton
Umpires: Chris Gaffaney and Tony Hill (both NZ)
Player of the match: James Franklin (NZ)

- Zimbabwe won the toss and elected to bat.
- T20I debut Andrew Ellis (NZ)
