= Indian cricket team in New Zealand in 2008–09 =

International cricket tour

Indian cricket team in New Zealand in 2009
	New Zealand	India
- Dates: 25 February – 7 April
Captains	Daniel Vettori	Mahendra Singh Dhoni

Test series
- Result: India won the 3-match series 1–0
Most runs	Jesse Ryder (327)	Gautam Gambhir (445)
Most wickets	Chris Martin (14)	Harbhajan Singh (16)

One Day International series
- Results: India won the 5-match series 3–1
Most runs	Jesse Ryder (262)	Virender Sehwag (259)
Most wickets	Ian Butler (3)	Harbhajan Singh (5)
- Player of the series: Virender Sehwag (Ind)

Twenty20 International series
- Results: New Zealand won the 2-match series 2–0
Most runs	Brendon McCullum (125)	Suresh Raina (61)
Most wickets	Iain O'Brien (4)	Harbhajan Singh (2)
- Player of the series: Brendon McCullum (NZ)

The Indian cricket team toured New Zealand from 25 February to 7 April 2009, playing a Test match series with New Zealand for the first time in five years. The tour included three Tests, five ODIs and two T20Is. New Zealand won both the T20Is. India won both the ODI series 3–1 and Test series 1–0.

== Squads ==
The Indian Squads were announced on 13 February. Dhawal Kulkarni got his maiden call up to the national squad, having been selected for the test squad after a strong debut Ranji trophy season where he was the highest wicket taker. L Balaji made a return to the Test squad after a five-year hiatus having last played in a test in 2004. Balaji was dropped from the ODI squad after he played in a single match in the previous tour, he was replaced by the now fit Munaf Patel. In the test squad Balaji replaced Pragyan Ojha with the selectors opting for an extra seamer instead of an extra spinner for the tour. Ojha retained his place in the ODI and T20 squads. Subramaniam Badrinath was dropped from the test squad in favour of reserve Wicket-Keeper Dinesh Karthik after Karthik too had a strong Ranji trophy season. Karthik was selected for all three squads, replacing Jadeja in the ODI squad. Ravindra Jadeja's impressive ODI debut was rewarded with a call up to the Twenty20 squad but Jadeja will be replaced by Sachin Tendulkar for the subsequent ODI series. Munaf Patel made a return to all three squads after having to pull out midway through the previous tour of Sri Lanka due to injury. Harbhajan Singh also made a return to all three squads after having to pull out at the beginning of the previous tour to Sri Lanka due to injury.

The New Zealand squad for the T20's was announced on 21 February. Jacob Oram Jesse Ryder and Ross Taylor returned after their injury. Oram however will only play as a batsman. Kyle Mills was injured and was replaced by Ewen Thompson. Ryder replaced Peter Fulton

T20Is		ODIs		Tests	
New Zealand	India	New Zealand	India	New Zealand	India
Daniel Vettori (c); Brendon McCullum (vc & wk); Neil Broom; Ian Butler; Grant Elliott; Martin Guptill; Nathan McCullum; Iain O'Brien; Jacob Oram; Jesse Ryder; Tim Southee; Ross Taylor; Ewen Thompson	MS Dhoni (c & wk); Virender Sehwag (vc); Gautam Gambhir; Yuvraj Singh; Suresh Raina; Rohit Sharma; Yusuf Pathan; Dinesh Karthik (wk); Harbhajan Singh; Irfan Pathan; Ravindra Jadeja; Zaheer Khan; Ishant Sharma; Praveen Kumar; Munaf Patel; Pragyan Ojha	Daniel Vettori (c); Brendon McCullum (vc & wk); Neil Broom; Ian Butler; Grant Elliott; Peter McGlashan (wk); Martin Guptill; Kyle Mills; Iain O'Brien; Jacob Oram; Jeetan Patel; Jesse Ryder; Tim Southee; Ross Taylor; Ewen Thompson	MS Dhoni (c & wk); Virender Sehwag (vc); Sachin Tendulkar; Gautam Gambhir; Yuvraj Singh; Suresh Raina; Rohit Sharma; Yusuf Pathan; Dinesh Karthik (wk); Harbhajan Singh; Zaheer Khan; Ishant Sharma; Praveen Kumar; Irfan Pathan; Munaf Patel; Pragyan Ojha	Daniel Vettori (c); Brendon McCullum (vc & wk); Brent Arnel; Daniel Flynn; James Franklin; Martin Guptill; Tim McIntosh; Chris Martin; Kyle Mills; Iain O'Brien; Jeetan Patel; Jesse Ryder; Ross Taylor; Jamie How; Tim Southee	MS Dhoni (c & wk); Virender Sehwag (vc); Gautam Gambhir; Rahul Dravid; Sachin Tendulkar; VVS Laxman; Murali Vijay; Yuvraj Singh; Dinesh Karthik (wk); Harbhajan Singh; Zaheer Khan; Ishant Sharma; Munaf Patel; Amit Mishra; Lakshmipathy Balaji; Dhawal Kulkarni

== Grounds ==
- AMI Stadium, Christchurch - Cap 36,500
- Basin Reserve, Wellington - Cap 11,600
- Eden Park, Auckland - Cap 50,000
- McLean Park, Napier - Cap 16,500
- Seddon Park, Hamilton - Cap 10,000
- Westpac Stadium, Wellington - Cap 33,500

== T20I Series ==
=== 1st T20I ===
25 February 2009
19:00 (D/N)
Scorecard

India; 162/8 (20 overs)	v	New Zealand; 166/3 (18.5 overs)
Suresh Raina 61* (43); Ian Butler 2/29 (4 overs)		Brendon McCullum 56* (49); Harbhajan Singh 1/19 (4 overs)

New Zealand won by 7 wickets
Lancaster Park, Christchurch
Umpires: Gary Baxter (NZ) and Evan Watkin (NZ)
Player of the match: Brendon McCullum (NZ)

- New Zealand won the toss and elected to field.

=== 2nd T20I ===
27 February 2009
19:00 (D/N)
Scorecard

India; 149/6 (20 overs)	v	New Zealand; 150/5 (20 overs)
Yuvraj Singh 50 (34); Iain O'Brien 2/30 (4 overs)		Brendon McCullum 69* (55); Irfan Pathan 2/41 (4 overs)

New Zealand won by 5 wickets
Westpac Stadium, Wellington
Umpires: Gary Baxter (NZ) and Tony Hill (NZ)
Player of the match: Brendon McCullum (NZ)

- New Zealand won the toss and elected to field.

== ODI series ==
=== 1st ODI ===
3 March 2009
Scorecard

India; 273/4 (38 overs)	v	New Zealand; 162/9 (28 overs)
MS Dhoni 84* (89); Daniel Vettori 1/42 (8 overs)		Martin Guptill 64 (70); Harbhajan Singh 3/27 (4 overs)

India won by 53 runs (D/L)
McLean Park, Napier
Umpires: Rudi Koertzen (SA) and Tony Hill (NZ)
Player of the match: MS Dhoni (Ind)

- India won the toss and elected to bat.
- Rain during the Indian innings reduced the match to 38 overs per side and further rain during the New Zealand innings reduced it to 28 overs.

=== 2nd ODI ===
6 March 2009
Scorecard

India; 188/4 (28.4 overs)	v	New Zealand
Sachin Tendulkar 61 (69); Daniel Vettori 1/14 (3 overs)

No result
Westpac Stadium, Wellington
Umpires: Rudi Koertzen (SA) and Evan Watkin (NZ)

- India won the toss and elected to bat.
- Rain reduced the match to 34 overs per side and subsequent rain after 28.4 overs of the Indian innings allowed no further play.
- Peter McGlashan (NZ) made his ODI debut.

=== 3rd ODI ===
8 March 2009
Scorecard

India; 392/4 (50 overs)	v	New Zealand; 334 (45.1 overs)
Sachin Tendulkar 163 (133); Kyle Mills 2/58 (10 overs)		Jesse Ryder 105 (80); Harbhajan Singh 2/56 (10 Overs)

India won by 58 runs
Lancaster Park, Christchurch
Umpires: Gary Baxter (NZ) and Rudi Koertzen (SA)
Player of the match: Sachin Tendulkar (Ind)

- New Zealand won the toss and elected to field.

=== 4th ODI ===
11 March 2009
Scorecard

New Zealand; 270/5 (47 overs)	v	India; 201/0 (23.3 overs)
Brendon McCullum 77 (95); Ishant Sharma 2/57 (8 overs)		Virender Sehwag 125* (74)

India won by 84 runs (D/L)
Seddon Park, Hamilton
Umpires: Gary Baxter (NZ) and Rudi Koertzen (SA)
Player of the match: Virender Sehwag (Ind)

- New Zealand won the toss and elected to bat.
- Ewen Thompson (NZ) made his ODI debut.

=== 5th ODI ===
14 March 2009
Scorecard

India; 149 (36.3 overs)	v	New Zealand; 151/2 (23.2 overs)
Rohit Sharma 43* (74); Jesse Ryder 3/29 (9 overs)		Jesse Ryder 63 (49); Praveen Kumar 1/22 (4 overs)

New Zealand won by 8 wickets
Eden Park, Auckland
Umpires: Gary Baxter (NZ) and Rudi Koertzen (SA)
Player of the match: Jesse Ryder (NZ)

- India won the toss and elected to bat.

== Test series ==
=== First Test ===
18–22 March 2009
Scorecard

New Zealand	v	India
279 (78.2 overs); Daniel Vettori 118 (164); Ishant Sharma 4/73 (19.2 overs)		520 (152.4 overs); Sachin Tendulkar 160 (260); Chris Martin 3/98 (30 overs)
279 (102.3 overs); Brendon McCullum 84 (135); Harbhajan Singh 6/63 (28 overs)		39/0 (5.2 overs); Gautam Gambhir 30* (18)

India won by 10 wickets
Seddon Park, Hamilton
Umpires: Simon Taufel (Aus) and Ian Gould (Eng)
Player of the match: Sachin Tendulkar (Ind)

- India won the toss and elected to field.
- Martin Guptill (NZ) made his debut in Tests.
- Jesse Ryder (NZ) scored his maiden century in Tests.
- Brendon McCullum (NZ) passed 2,000 runs in Tests.
- Zaheer Khan (Ind) claimed his 200th wicket in Tests.
- This was India first Test win in New Zealand in 33 years.

=== Second Test ===
26–30 March 2009
Scorecard

New Zealand	v	India
619/9d (154.4 overs); Jesse Ryder 201 (328); Ishant Sharma 5/95 (27 overs)		305 (93.5 overs); Rahul Dravid 83 (226); Chris Martin 3/89 (24 overs)
		476/4 (180 overs); Gautam Gambhir 137 (436); Jeetan Patel 2/120 (45 overs)

Match drawn
McLean Park, Napier
Umpires: Billy Doctrove (WI), Ian Gould (Eng) and Evan Watkin (NZ)
Player of the match: Jesse Ryder (NZ)

- New Zealand won the toss and elected to bat.

=== Third Test ===
3–7 April 2009
Scorecard

India	v	New Zealand
379 (92.1 overs); Sachin Tendulkar 62 (85); Chris Martin 4/98 (25.1 overs)		197 (65 overs); Ross Taylor 42 (92); Zaheer Khan 5/65 (18 overs)
434/7d (116 overs); Gautam Gambhir 167 (257); Chris Martin 3/70 (22 overs)		281/8 (94.3 overs); Ross Taylor 107 (165); Harbhajan Singh 4/59 (33 overs)

Match drawn
Basin Reserve, Wellington
Umpires: Daryl Harper (Aus) and Simon Taufel (Aus)
Player of the match: Gautam Gambhir (Ind)

- New Zealand won the toss and elected to field.
