= Parlane =

Parlane is a surname of Scottish origin. Notable persons with the surname include:

- Brent Parlane, New Zealand-Australian singer
- Derek Parlane (born 1953), Scottish footballer
- Michael Parlane (born 1972), New Zealand cricketer, brother of Neal
- Neal Parlane (born 1978), New Zealand cricketer, brother of Michael
- Robert Parlane (1847–1918), Scottish footballer
- Rosy Parlane (real name Paul Douglas), New Zealand electronic musician
- Tim Parlane (born 1957), New Zealand cricket umpire
- William Parlane (1908–1988), Scottish footballer
