= Andre Adams =

New Zealand former cricketer

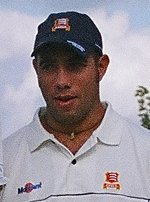

Personal information
- Full name: Andre Ryan Adams
- Born: 17 July 1975 (age 51); Auckland, New Zealand
- Batting: Right-handed
- Bowling: Right-arm fast-medium

International information
- National side: New Zealand (2001–2007)
- Only Test (cap 219): 30 March 2002 v England
- ODI debut (cap 122): 10 April 2001 v Sri Lanka
- Last ODI: 6 January 2007 v Sri Lanka
- ODI shirt no.: 41
- T20I debut (cap 1): 17 February 2005 v Australia
- Last T20I: 26 December 2006 v Sri Lanka

Domestic team information
- Years: Team
- 1997/98–2012/13: Auckland
- 2001: Herefordshire
- 2004–2006: Essex
- 2007–2014: Nottinghamshire
- 2008: Kolkata Tigers
- 2012: Khulna Royal Bengal
- 2015: Hampshire

Career statistics
Competition	Test	ODI	FC	LA
Matches	1	42	173	165
Runs scored	18	419	4,540	1,504
Batting average	9.00	17.45	21.31	16.71
100s/50s	0/0	0/0	3/18	0/1
Top score	11	45	124	90*
Balls bowled	190	1,885	33,380	7,561
Wickets	6	53	692	209
Bowling average	17.50	31.00	23.95	28.50
5 wickets in innings	0	1	27	4
10 wickets in match	0	0	5	0
Best bowling	3/44	5/22	7/32	5/7
Catches/stumpings	1/–	8/–	114/–	40/–
- Source: ESPNcricinfo, 19 August 2016

Andre Ryan Adams (born 17 July 1975) is a New Zealand cricket coach and former cricketer of Caribbean descent. He played international cricket for New Zealand and is noted for playing in New Zealand's first T20I against Australia in 2005 where he was awarded cap number 1.

== Early life and career ==
Andre Adams was born on 17 July 1975 in Auckland, New Zealand, to a Saint Vincent and the Grenadines father and a Guyanese mother with partial Corsican ancestry.

Adams debuted at the highest level for New Zealand in March 2002, but a bout of back injuries on the West Indies tour of 2002 allowed Jacob Oram to move ahead of him in the pecking order, limiting him to one Test. Following that, question marks were raised about his attitude. He played in the 2003 World Cup, but soon lost his place again and was resigned to a life in the wilderness until he received a very late call-up to New Zealand's one-day squad in England towards the end of the 2004 NatWest Series. He didn't end up playing, but later signed with Essex for the remainder of the summer, where he stayed for the 2005 and 2006 seasons.

He had a productive 2006-07 domestic season for Auckland, claiming 32 wickets at 18.78 in New Zealand's domestic first-class State Championship and scoring 318 runs at 39.75. However, this was overshadowed by his one-month suspension for grabbing and shaking the helmet of Central Districts batsman Bevan Griggs. Along the way, Adams was recalled for three ODIs against Sri Lanka in December but was overlooked for the World Cup and lost his national contract in May 2007. He was overlooked again the following season, despite impressive performances in the State Championship, and the frustration prompted him to sign a two-year contract with the now defunct Indian Cricket League.

== County cricket ==
In 2007, Adams signed with English county Nottinghamshire. He had a fine 2010 County Championship, topping the bowling charts for the country with 68 wickets including the wicket of Shivnarine Chanderpaul to seal the title at Old Trafford on the last day of the season. 2011 was also very productive with 550 Runs and 67 wickets from 16 matches (including 7 Five Wicket Hauls) at 22.61, placing him third on the season's overall bowling table. He was a part of the Auckland side that won the New Zealand's domestic one-day cup and Twenty20 tournament in 2010–11, and traveled with the team in September to India for the 2011 Champions League T20.

Adams had intended to end his professional career at Nottinghamshire where he had taken 334 first class wickets for an average of 24.18. He signed a three-month contract with Hampshire for the beginning of the 2015 season. Injuries limited him to only three first class appearances for Hampshire and he announced his retirement at age 39. He received high praise from his former club Nottinghamshire where he spent eight seasons for his role in inspiring younger bowlers at the club.

== Coaching ==
In 2015 Adams joined the Auckland Cricket Club as bowling coach for the 2015/16 season. The club had a successful season and for 2016/17 Adams was Auckland A Head Coach. In February 2024, he became the fast bowling coach of the Bangladesh national cricket team .
