= Oldham Cricket Club =

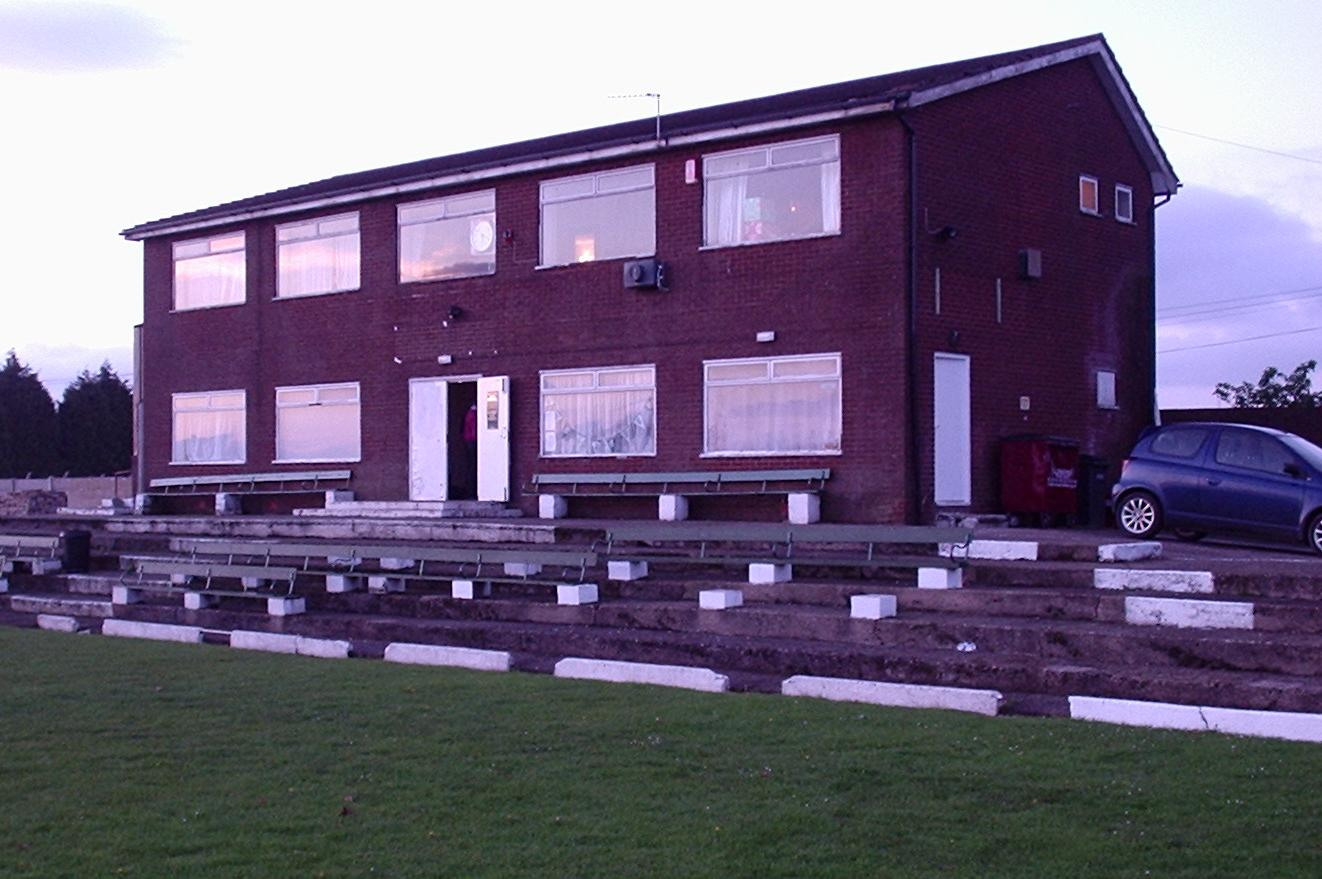
Oldham Cricket Club
League	Central Lancashire League
Ground	The Pollards, Watersheddings, Oldham, Greater Manchester
Professional	Chinta de Silva (Sri Lanka)
CLL History	1892–93; 1900–present
Honours	First Division: 5 times Wood Cup: 5 times Second Division: 6 times (shared once); Burton Cup: 1 time Moor Cup Cup: 1 time Aggregate Cup: 3 times

Oldham Cricket Club is a cricket team based at The Pollards in the Watersheddings area of Oldham, Greater Manchester, England.

In 1892 Oldham were one of the founding members of the Central Lancashire League and currently run teams in the First and Second divisions; with junior sides at Under 18 and Under 15 levels.

Their professional for 2007 was Greg Todd of New Zealand, who heralded the end of a long line of South African professionals at the club, including Mark Charlton (2006) and Martin Smith (2004–05).

== Honours ==
First Division: 1909, 1916, 1957, 1979, 1982
Wood Cup: 1943, 1979, 1983, 1985, 1988
Second Division: 1902, 1930, 1944 (shared), 1983, 1985, 1986, 2016
Burton Cup: 1976
Moor Cup: 2017
