= Brandon Hiini =

New Zealand cricketer (born 1981)

Personal information
- Full name: Brandon Christopher Hiini
- Born: 11 December 1981 (age 44); Invercargill, New Zealand
- Batting: Right-handed
- Bowling: Right-arm Medium fast
- Role: All-rounder

Domestic team information
- Years: Team
- 2005/06-2011/12: Canterbury

Career statistics
Competition	FC	LA	T20
Matches	38	26	8
Runs scored	1,070	243	2
Batting average	27.43	22.09	1.00
100s/50s	2/2	0/0	0/0
Top score	103*	47	1*
Balls bowled	6,371	1,078	210
Wickets	98	23	9
Bowling average	31.28	46.86	23.33
5 wickets in innings	2	0	0
10 wickets in match	0	0	0
Best bowling	7/148	3/38	3/17
Catches/stumpings	17/0	5/0	2/0
- Source: Cricinfo, 21 January 2025

Brandon Christopher Hiini (born 11 December 1981) is a New Zealand cricketer who played for Canterbury. He was born in Invercargill.

In 2007 Brandon took up a professional contract with the Enfield Cricket Club who play in the Lancashire Cricket league.

Hiini played for Canterbury, Northern Districts, NZ A and NZ emerging teams. On his First Class debut he took 5 wickets for Canterbury v Central Districts. He then followed up with his maiden First Class Hundred v Northern Districts at Seddon Park in just his 2nd game. He also was named bowler of the tournament for the 2009 Emerging Players Tournament held in Brisbane featuring NZ, Australia, India and South Africa.

These teams featured the likes of Virat Kohli and David Warner and the NZ Side consisting of Trent Boult, BJ Watling and James Franklin.
