= Richard Jones (New Zealand cricketer) =

New Zealand cricketer (born 1973)

Personal information
- Full name: Richard Andrew Jones
- Born: 22 October 1973 (age 53); Auckland, New Zealand
- Batting: Right-handed

International information
- National side: New Zealand
- Only Test (cap 223): 26 December 2003 v Pakistan
- ODI debut (cap 131): 29 November 2003 v Pakistan
- Last ODI: 7 December 2003 v Pakistan

Career statistics
Competition	Test	ODI	FC	LA
Matches	1	5	124	132
Runs scored	23	168	7,254	3,212
Batting average	11.50	33.60	35.73	25.90
100s/50s	0/0	0/1	19/33	1/16
Top score	16	63	201	108
Catches/stumpings	0/–	0/–	106/–	36/–
- Source: Cricinfo, 4 May 2017

Richard Jones (born 22 October 1973) is a cricketer. He started well, captaining the New Zealand Under-19s cricket team in 1993/4. He went on to represent the full senior side in one Test match and five One Day Internationals.

Representing Auckland in a match against Wellington, he scored a century – the day before his wedding. He was also the captain of the Auckland Aces, and played for the North Harbour cricket team in the Hawke Cup. In February 2001, he took a wicket with his one and only delivery in a first-class cricket match.

== See also ==
- One-Test wonder
