= Joshua Brodie =

New Zealand cricketer (born 1987)

Joshua Michael Brodie (born 8 June 1987 in Wellington) is a New Zealand cricketer who played for the Wellington Firebirds in the State Championship.

== Cricket ==
Brodie is a left-handed batsman.
