= Gareth Shaw =

New Zealand cricketer (born 1982)

Gareth Simon Shaw (born 14 February 1982) is a New Zealand former cricketer. He played for the New Zealand national under-19 cricket team in the 2000 Under-19 Cricket World Cup in 2000 and later played first-class and List A cricket for Auckland and Otago.

Shaw was born at Auckland in 1982 and educated at Saint Kentigern College in the city. Primarily playing as a right-arm medium-fast bowler, he played age-group cricket for Auckland teams before making his senior representative debut for the team in January 2002.

After four seasons playing for Auckland, Shaw moved to Otago for a single season in 2005–06, seeking more opportunities to play after having made only 15 appearances for Auckland. He later returned to the Auckland team, playing nine Plunket Shield matches in the 2009–10 and 2010–11 seasons. His brother, Lance Shaw, played 38 senior matches for Auckland between 2005–06 and 2009–10.
