= Warren McSkimming =

New Zealand cricketer

Personal information
- Full name: Warren Charles McSkimming
- Born: 21 June 1979 (age 47); Ranfurly, Central Otago, New Zealand
- Batting: Right-handed
- Bowling: Right-arm medium
- Role: Bowler

Domestic team information
- Years: Team
- 1999/00–2011/12: Otago

Career statistics
Competition	FC	LA	T20
Matches	69	96	25
Runs scored	1,705	670	106
Batting average	20.05	13.67	53.00
100s/50s	1/8	0/2	0/0
Top score	111	59*	23
Balls bowled	13,172	4,701	470
Wickets	240	117	19
Bowling average	24.35	32.01	34.52
5 wickets in innings	11	1	0
10 wickets in match	2	0	0
Best bowling	6/39	5/9	3/28
Catches/stumpings	28/–	26/–	11/–
- Source: CricInfo, 17 December 2018

Warren Charles McSkimming (born 21 June 1979) is a New Zealand former professional cricketer. He played for the Otago cricket team between the 1999–00 season and 2011–12, making more than 170 senior appearances for the team.

McSkimming was born at Ranfurly in Central Otago in 1979 and educated at Waitaki Boys' High School. His father, Bryan McSkimming, had played Hawke Cup cricket for Central Otago and had played in the Otago provincial team's Second XI.

A medium-paced bowler who focussed "more on accuracy, rather than bounce or pace, McSkimming played age-group cricket for Otago from the 1996–97 season and played three youth One Day Internationals for the New Zealand under-19 team against an England under-19 team in early 1999. He went on to make his senior representative debut for Otago in December of the same year, playing a List A against Canterbury, opening the bowling without taking a wicket and scoring two not out. He made his first-class debut later the same season, taking five wickets for Otago against the same team.

McSkimming went on to play regularly for Otago in a career which last until the end of the 2010–11 season. He took 240 first-class and 117 List A wickets and made a first-class century, a score of 111 runs made as part of an Otago record ninth wicket partnership of 208 runs with Bradley Scott against Auckland in 2004–05. He played for the New Zealand A team four times, touring Sri Lanka with the team in 2005 and playing against a touring England team in 2008–09. Although he was never capped by the national team, he was selected in the 30-man preliminary New Zealand squad for the Champions Trophy in 2006.
