= Shanan Stewart =

New Zealand cricketer (born 1982)

Personal information
- Full name: Shanan Luke Stewart
- Born: 21 June 1982 (age 44); Christchurch, Canterbury, New Zealand
- Batting: Right-handed
- Bowling: Right-arm medium

International information
- National side: New Zealand
- ODI debut (cap 160): 11 March 2010 v Australia
- Last ODI: 11 October 2010 v Bangladesh

Domestic team information
- Years: Team
- 2001/02–2013/14: Canterbury

Career statistics
| Competition | ODI | FC | LA | T20 |
|---|---|---|---|---|
| Matches | 4 | 96 | 116 | 41 |
| Runs scored | 26 | 5,693 | 3,521 | 679 |
| Batting average | 6.50 | 36.72 | 33.53 | 19.97 |
| 100s/50s | 0/0 | 7/35 | 4/19 | 0/5 |
| Top score | 14 | 227* | 120 | 88* |
| Balls bowled | – | 1,491 | 60 | – |
| Wickets | – | 28 | 3 | – |
| Bowling average | – | 29.50 | 27.33 | – |
| 5 wickets in innings | – | 1 | 0 | – |
| 10 wickets in match | – | 0 | 0 | – |
| Best bowling | – | 5/42 | 2/51 | – |
| Catches/stumpings | 0/– | 25/– | 22/– | 4/– |
- Source: Cricinfo, 13 May 2017

Shanan Luke Stewart (born 21 June 1982) is a former New Zealand cricketer who played four One Day Internationals and for Canterbury in domestic cricket. He is a right-handed batsman and represented New Zealand A during the Top End tour. He was born at Christchurch.

He was called up to the national team for the 2009–10 Australian Tour due to injuries to James Franklin and Ross Taylor.

In the 2009-10 season he and Kruger van Wyk added and unbeaten partnership of 379 for Canterbury to record the highest sixth wicket partnership in New Zealand first-class cricket.

Stewart retired from all cricket in 2014.
