= Robbie Schaw =

New Zealand cricketer

Personal information
- Full name: Robert James Schaw
- Born: 12 May 1984 (age 42); Waipukurau, Hawkes Bay, New Zealand
- Batting: Left-handed
- Bowling: Slow left-arm wrist-spin
- Role: Bowler

Domestic team information
- Years: Team
- 2006/07–2008/09: Central Districts
- 2009/10: Wellington
- FC debut: 29 November 2006 Central Districts v Northern Districts
- Last FC: 20 March 2010 Wellington v Canterbury
- LA debut: 15 January 2007 Central Districts v Canterbury
- Last LA: 23 December 2009 Wellington v Auckland

Career statistics
Competition	FC	LA	T20
Matches	18	21	17
Runs scored	357	71	71
Batting average	14.87	8.87	23.66
100s/50s	0/0	0/0	0/0
Top score	34	18*	19*
Balls bowled	2,657	1,084	284
Wickets	33	17	16
Bowling average	55.39	51.88	26.75
5 wickets in innings	1	0	0
10 wickets in match	0	0	0
Best bowling	5/130	2/36	3/21
Catches/stumpings	8/–	2/–	4/–
- Source: CricInfo, 13 August 2020

Robert James Schaw (born 12 May 1984) is a former New Zealand cricketer.

A slow left-arm wrist-spin bowler, Schaw was born in Waipukurau, Central Hawke's Bay District's largest town, and played for Central Districts cricket team since his debut in 2006, featuring in the first class, one day and Twenty20 line-ups. In July 2009 he was purchased by Wellington.

Anthony Stuart, Wellington's coach, observed that "Robbie gives us some variation and I think he will thrive on the concentrated training environment we have ... He's bowled well against us in the past, he's a young guy and being a wrist spinner his best years are ahead of him."
