= Greg Todd =

New Zealand cricketer

Personal information
- Full name: Gregory Rex Todd
- Born: 17 June 1982 (age 44); Masterton, Wairarapa, New Zealand
- Batting: Left-handed
- Bowling: Right-arm medium
- Role: Bastman

Domestic team information
- Years: Team
- 1999/00–2011/12: Wairarapa
- 2000/01–2002/03: Central Districts
- 2004/05–2009/10: Otago
- 2010/11: Auckland
- 2011/12: Central Districts
- FC debut: 29 November 2000 Central Districts v Otago
- Last FC: 20 November 2011 Central Districts v Canterbury
- LA debut: 10 December 2000 Central Districts v Northern Districts
- Last LA: 5 February 2012 Central Districts v Auckland

Career statistics
| Competition | FC | LA | T20 |
|---|---|---|---|
| Matches | 64 | 68 | 18 |
| Runs scored | 3,368 | 1,468 | 341 |
| Batting average | 34.02 | 27.69 | 28.41 |
| 100s/50s | 4/20 | 0/7 | 0/0 |
| Top score | 165 | 95 | 39 |
| Balls bowled | 2,223 | 465 | – |
| Wickets | 20 | 12 | – |
| Bowling average | 64.65 | 35.33 | – |
| 5 wickets in innings | 0 | 0 | – |
| 10 wickets in match | 0 | 0 | – |
| Best bowling | 2/26 | 2/23 | – |
| Catches/stumpings | 25/– | 22/– | 5/– |
- Source: CricketArchive, 29 January 2024

Gregory Rex Todd (born 17 June 1982) is a former New Zealand cricketer who played first-class, List A and Twenty20 cricket for Central Districts, Otago and Auckland between the 2000–01 season and 2011–12.

Todd was born at Masterton near Wellington and educated at Rathkeale College in the town. He played age-group cricket fo both Central Districts and Auckland before making his senior debut for Wairarapa in the Hawke Cup during the 1999–2000 season. He went on to make his senior representative debut for Central Districts the following season. Later in the 2000–01 season Todd played for New Zealand under-19s in three under-19 Test matches and three under-10 One Day Internationals against the touring South African under-19 side.

After three seasons with Central Districts, during which he played 10 first-class and six List A matches, Todd moved to Otago where there were more opportunities to break into the side as a batsman. He had not played at all in senior cricket during the 2003–04 season, but played eight first-class matches for Otago during 2004–05, scoring 552 runs including his first senior century, an innings of 123 not out scored against Canterbury. The following season he played some matches before breaking his leg and ankle whilst bowling in a one-day match in January 2006. He bowled infrequently in top-level cricket after the injury.

The leg injury ruled him out for the remainder of the season, but in 2006–07 Todd scored 522 runs, with another century, and in 2007–08 was Otago's leading first-class run scorer with 576 runs. The season saw him score two centuries in a match, making scores of 110 and 165, his highest first-class score, against Wellington at the Basin Reserve.

In July 2010, after six seasons at Otago, Todd moved to play for Auckland for the 2010–11 season. He had played over 100 times for Otago in all formats, scoring 2,774 first-class runs at a batting average of 40.20 runs per innings. After a single season with Auckland he played one season for Central Districts before moving to Melbourne in Australia to play as a professional cricketer. He later joined the police force in Victoria.

As well as playing in New Zealand and Australia, Todd played for Hermes DVS in the Dutch Hoofdklasse and Topklasse competitions for five seasons. In 2007 he was the professional for Oldham Cricket Club in the Lancashire League in England, and in 2008 was the professional for Guisborough Cricket Club in the North Yorkshire and South Durham Cricket League.
