= Sam Wells (cricketer) =

New Zealand cricketer (born 1984)

Personal information
- Full name: Samuel Raymond Wells
- Born: 13 July 1984 (age 42); Dunedin, Otago, New Zealand
- Batting: Left-handed
- Bowling: Right-arm medium
- Role: All-rounder

Domestic team information
- Years: Team
- 2007/08–2016/17: Otago

Career statistics
Competition	FC	LA	T20
Matches	63	43	37
Runs scored	2,707	817	202
Batting average	31.11	21.50	13.46
100s/50s	4/20	0/5	0/0
Top score	118	93	35
Balls bowled	7,711	1,580	266
Wickets	115	39	19
Bowling average	37.81	37.58	20.78
5 wickets in innings	3	1	0
10 wickets in match	0	0	0
Best bowling	5/26	5/41	4/24
Catches/stumpings	18/–	13/–	19/–
- Source: CricInfo, 16 February 2024

Samuel Raymond Wells (born 13 July 1984) is a New Zealand former cricketer who played for Otago between the 2007–08 and 2016–17 seasons. He played as an all-rounder.

== Cricket career ==
Wells was born at Dunedin in 1984 and was educated at Otago Boys' High School in the city before studying law and politics at Otago University, graduating in 2007. He first played for Otago age-group sides during the 2002–03 season and for the Otago 'A' team from 2004 to 2005, before making his debut for the senior provincial side in a November 2007 first-class match against Central Districts, making scores of 15 and five not out on debut.

An all-rounder, Wells played predominantly in first-class matches during his early career, making his List A debut in 2008–09 and his Twenty20 debut in 2010–11. Two five-wicket hauls in the first two matches of the 2009–10 Plunket Shield season brought him to wider attention, and later in the season he scored his first two centuries. He scored 478 first-class runs during the season, finishing with a batting average of 59.75 runs per innings, and took 21 wickets. The following season saw his batting average at 40.16 and he attended a New Zealand national team training camp ahead of the 2011–12 season.

After scoring a rapid 65 runs and taking one wicket for a New Zealand XI in a warm up match against the touring Zimbabweans in January 2012, Wells was a surprise call up to the New Zealand squad for the only Test match of the tour. He did not play in the match and was never called up to a full national squad again, although he did play two first-class matches for the New Zealand A team against India A during their tour of New Zealand in September and October 2012.

In a domestic career that lasted until the end of the 2016–17 season, Wells played 141 matches for Otago. In 63 first-class matches, 61 of which were for the provincial side, he scored four centuries and took 115 wickets. He also played in 43 List A and 37 Twenty20 matches for Otago.

== Professional and selection career ==
Wells was admitted to the bar in 2014 and has worked in litigation at the Dunedin law firm Gallaway Cook Allan. He was a selector for the Otago A side and in November 2022 was appointed the Convenor of Selectors for the Otago side. After a season in the role he was appointed as the selection manager for the New Zealand national side, working alongside coaches to inform the selection process.
