= Bevan Griggs =

New Zealand cricketer (born 1978)

Bevan Barry John Griggs
- Born: March 29, 1978 (age 46); Palmerston North, Manawatu, New Zealand

Bevan Barry John Griggs (born 29 March 1978) is a New Zealand cricketer who played for Central Districts. In his 83 first-class cricket matches he has taken 245 dismissals for Central Districts, a CD record. Bevan also plays for United cricket club in Palmerston North. He was born in Palmerston North. He scored 3155 runs from 130 innings of 83 matches.
