= Richard Sherlock =

New Zealand cricketer (born 1983)

Richard Roland Sherlock (born 15 September 1983) is a New Zealand former professional cricketer who played for the Canterbury cricket team. He played for the New Zealand "A" team in 2004 and 2005, but his career suffered a setback when he was injured in the build-up to the 2005–06 New Zealand cricket season. In 2010 Sherlock played with Horsham in the Sussex cricket competition. He was born in Palmerston North.
