= Lance Shaw =

New Zealand cricketer (born 1983)

Lance Joseph Shaw (born 24 August 1983) is a former New Zealand cricketer who played for the Auckland Aces in the State Championship.

He was educated at Saint Kentigern College and played representative cricket for Auckland at U17 & U19 level before making his Auckland Aces debut in 2005. He also represented NZ Emerging Players in 2009. He was born in Auckland. He is the younger brother of Gareth Shaw.

== See also ==
- List of Auckland representative cricketers
