= Bradley Scott (cricketer) =

New Zealand cricketer

Personal information
- Full name: Bradley Esmond Scott
- Born: 16 September 1979 (age 47); Ashburton, Canterbury, New Zealand
- Batting: Left-handed
- Bowling: Left-arm fast-medium
- Role: All-rounder

Domestic team information
- Years: Team
- 1999/00: Dunedin Metro
- 2000/01–2007/08: Otago
- 2008/09–2012/13: Northern Districts
- 2011/12: Hamilton
- 2013/14–2015/16: Otago

Career statistics
Competition	FC	LA	T20
Matches	66	103	61
Runs scored	1,361	691	273
Batting average	21.60	17.27	16.05
100s/50s	0/6	0/0	0/0
Top score	96	44	22*
Balls bowled	11,811	4,964	1,180
Wickets	182	117	65
Bowling average	28.11	35.39	24.33
5 wickets in innings	5	0	0
10 wickets in match	0	0	0
Best bowling	6/20	4/63	4/13
Catches/stumpings	20/–	27/–	16/–
- Source: CricketArchive, 15 February 2024

Bradley Esmond Scott (born 16 September 1979) is a New Zealand former first-class cricketer. He played over 200 top-level matches for Otago and Northern Districts between the 2000–01 and 2012–13 seasons.

Scott was born at Ashburton in Canterbury in 1979 and educated at King's High School in Dunedin. He played age-group and A team cricket for Otago and in the Hawke Cup for Dunedin Metropolitan before making his representative debut for Otago in the 2000–01 season. He made a total of 151 senior appearances for the side, playing in first-class, List A and Twenty20 competitions in two spells. He was part of a record Otago partnership for the ninth wicket in first-class matches. Scott and Warren McSkimming scored 208 runs against Auckland during the 2004–05 season, Scott scoring a career best 96 before being last out in Otago's first innings total of 348.

Primarily a left-arm fast-medium bowler, Scott was selected as part of the 30 man preliminary New Zealand squad for the Champions Trophy in 2006 alongside Otago team-mate Nathan McCullum. He was later selected in the squad for the World Twenty20 held in September 2007 but did not play a match for the national side. Ahead of the 2008–09 season he joined Northern Districts, making more than 70 appearances for the side before returning to play for Otago after the 2012–13 season. In a total of 66 first-class matches he took 182 wickets before retiring due to an injured back which required surgery in 2017.

Professionally Scott has worked as a maths and physical education teacher. He worked as King's High School in his first stint playing for Otago before moving to work in Hamilton whilst playing for Northern Districts. He returned to King's when he moved back to Otago in 2011.
