= Dewayne Bowden =

New Zealand cricketer (born 1982)

Personal information
- Born: 27 February 1982 (age 44); Nelson, New Zealand
- Source: Cricinfo, 23 October 2020

Dewayne Bowden (born 27 February 1982) is a New Zealand cricketer. He played in 33 first-class, 32 List A, and 29 Twenty20 matches for Wellington from 2006 to 2011.

== See also ==
- List of Wellington representative cricketers
