= Michael Parlane =

New Zealand cricketer (born 1972)

Michael Edward Parlane (born 22 July 1972) is a New Zealand cricketer. He played 64 first-class matches for Northern Districts before shifting to Wellington to extend his first-class career. He was born in Pukekohe. He is the older brother of Neal Parlane.

Michael Parlane also played for Northland in the Hawke Cup.
