= Nick Beard =

New Zealand cricketer

Nicholas Beard
Personal information
- Full name: Nicholas Brendan Beard
- Born: 16 September 1989 (age 37); Dunedin, Otago
- Batting: Left-handed
- Bowling: Slow left arm orthodox
- Role: Bowler

Domestic team information
- Years: Team
- 2008/09–2015/16: Otago
- FC debut: 13 March 2009 Otago v Auckland
- Last FC: 24 October 2015 Otago v Canterbury
- LA debut: 17 December 2009 Otago v Auckland
- Last LA: 23 March 2014 Otago v Auckland

Career statistics
Competition	FC	LA	T20
Matches	36	36	55
Runs scored	714	125	101
Batting average	24.62	12.50	14.42
100s/50s	1/1	0/0	0/0
Top score	188	24*	20
Balls bowled	6,220	1,705	1,065
Wickets	69	32	46
Bowling average	44.37	44.78	26.67
5 wickets in innings	1	0	0
10 wickets in match	0	0	0
Best bowling	6/107	3/34	4/16
Catches/stumpings	11/–	3/–	13/–
- Source: CricInfo, 4 January 2022

Nicholas Brendan Beard (born 16 September 1989) is a New Zealand former professional cricketer. He played as a left-handed batsman and left-arm slow bowler for Otago. He was born at Dunedin and educated at Kavanagh College.

Beard played for the New Zealand under-19 side at the 2008 Under-19 Cricket World Cup, playing in two warm-up matches and five Youth One Day International matches during the competition. He went on to make two Youth Test appearances and two further Youth One Day International appearances against the England under-19 side on the side's 2008 tour of England.

Having first played for Otago's Second XI in January 2009, Beard made his first-class cricket debut two months later for the side, against Auckland. He took his career best innings bowling figure of six wickets for 107 runs against Auckland in March 2010 and played for a New Zealand emerging players side later in the year before touring Zimbabwe with the New Zealand A side in October.

Beard took his best Twenty20 cricket bowling figures of 4/16 against Wellington in December 2012 and later in the same season scored his only first-class century. Batting as a nightwatchman he made 188 runs against Auckland in February 2013, and innings that included 31 fours and one six and was described as "remarkable" by CricInfo. His previous highest score of 62, and only other score in excess of 50 runs, had been made in 2010.

By the 2014–15 season however, Beard's bowling action was under scrutiny. He remodelled his action and was cleared to bowl again ahead of the 2015–16 season but experience more problems with his action during the season. Beard had already qualified to trade as a real estate agent and initially planned to take some time away from cricket whilst working in that industry. He played his last matches for Otago during the 2015–16 Plunket Shield and later chose to retire from cricket and become a full-time real estate agent.
