= Ewen Thompson =

New Zealand cricketer (born 1979)

Personal information
- Full name: Ewen Paul Thompson
- Born: 17 December 1979 (age 46); Warkworth, Auckland, New Zealand
- Batting: Left-handed
- Bowling: Left arm fast-medium

International information
- National side: New Zealand
- Only ODI (cap 155): 11 March 2009 v India
- Only T20I (cap 33): 28 December 2008 v West Indies

Domestic team information
- Years: Team
- 2000/01–2009/10: Central Districts

Career statistics
Competition	ODI	T20I	FC	LA
Matches	1	1	52	59
Runs scored	–	1	1,734	599
Batting average	–	–	26.27	18.15
100s/50s	–	0/0	3/8	0/3
Top score	–	1*	126	62*
Balls bowled	24	18	10,155	3,385
Wickets	0	1	177	104
Bowling average	–	18.00	30.00	25.46
5 wickets in innings	–	0	6	3
10 wickets in match	–	0	1	0
Best bowling	–	1/18	7/55	6/20
Catches/stumpings	0/–	0/–	18/–	17/–
- Source: Cricinfo, 25 April 2022

Ewen Paul Thompson (born 17 December 1979) is a former New Zealand international cricketer who played in the Under-19 Cricket World Cup in 1998. He was born in Warkworth.

Thompson was called up to the New Zealand squad at the age of 29 for the two Twenty20 Internationals against the West Indies in December 2008. He made his debut in the second match at Hamilton.

Thompson also played for Northland, Manawatu and Horowhenua-Kapiti in the Hawke Cup.
