= Neal Parlane =

New Zealand cricketer

Personal information
- Full name: Neal Ronald Parlane
- Born: 9 August 1978 (age 48); Whangārei, New Zealand
- Nickname: Flea
- Height: 172 cm (5 ft 8 in)
- Batting: Right-handed
- Relatives: Michael Parlane (brother)

Domestic team information
- Years: Team
- 1996/97–2000/01: Northern Districts
- 2002/03–2010/11: Wellington
- 2011/12: Auckland

Career statistics
Competition	FC	LA	T20
Matches	103	108	28
Runs scored	5,602	2,590	721
Batting average	35.91	27.26	30.04
100s/50s	12/32	3/15	0/4
Top score	193	117	85
Balls bowled	54	0	0
Wickets	0	–	–
Bowling average	–	–	–
5 wickets in innings	–	–	–
10 wickets in match	–	–	–
Best bowling	–	–	–
Catches/stumpings	115/–	52/–	7/–
- Source: CricInfo, 27 May 2022

Neal Ronald Parlane (born 9 August 1978) is a New Zealand cricketer and coach. He played first-class cricket for Northern Districts, Wellington and Auckland, making over 100 first-class appearances in a career which lasted from 1996/97 to 2001/12. He was born in Whangārei. He is the younger brother of Michael Parlane.

Parlane's highest first-class score was 193, off 195 balls, for Wellington against Otago in 2009–10. He scored centuries for Auckland in his last two List A matches, in February 2012, in the finals of the Ford Trophy: 117 against Otago, then 106 against Central Districts, when Auckland lost the final by two wickets.

Parlane also played Hawke Cup cricket for Northland between 1995 and 2018. He scored a century when Northland gained the title from Auckland-Waitakere in March 1998. In 2019 he was appointed coach of Northland. Later he became Northland Cricket's general manager.
