= Mathew Sinclair =

New Zealand cricketer

Personal information
- Full name: Mathew Stuart Sinclair
- Born: 9 November 1975 (age 51); Katherine, Northern Territory, Australia
- Batting: Right-handed
- Bowling: Right-arm medium
- Role: Occasional wicketkeeper

International information
- National side: New Zealand (1999–2009)
- Test debut (cap 208): 26 December 1999 v West Indies
- Last Test: 27 March 2010 v Australia
- ODI debut (cap 113): 26 February 2000 v Australia
- Last ODI: 10 January 2009 v West Indies
- T20I debut (cap 8): 17 February 2005 v Australia
- Last T20I: 11 December 2007 v Australia

Domestic team information
- Years: Team
- 1995/96–2012/13: Central Districts

Career statistics
Competition	Test	ODI	FC	LA
Matches	33	54	188	229
Runs scored	1,635	1,304	13,717	6,515
Batting average	32.05	28.34	48.64	34.83
100s/50s	3/4	2/8	36/68	7/48
Top score	214	118*	268	123
Balls bowled	24	–	2,659	172
Wickets	0	–	24	3
Bowling average	–	–	47.37	61.00
5 wickets in innings	–	–	0	0
10 wickets in match	–	–	0	0
Best bowling	–	–	3/29	1/15
Catches/stumpings	31/–	17/0	203/1	114/2
- Source: ESPNcricinfo, 1 May 2017

Mathew Stuart Sinclair (born 9 November 1975) is a former Australian-born New Zealand cricketer. He is a right-handed middle order batsman who has also opened the innings. He holds the equal world record for the highest Test score (214) by a number three batsman on debut when he opened his international career against West Indies in 1999.

== Personal life ==
Born in Katherine, Northern Territory, Australia, Sinclair moved to New Zealand with his mother after the death of his father in an accident when Mathew was only five years old.

== Domestic career ==
A right-handed middle-order batsman occasionally used as an opener, he played for Central Districts from the 1995–96 season, and in a period when the New Zealand cricket authorities were actively developing their infrastructure with the aim of raising the standards of the New Zealand team, he played for both Academy and A teams before making his Test debut.

When batting for Central Districts against Northern Districts in 1997, he was left not out on 99 when Grant Bradburn bowled a wide down the legside that beat the wicketkeeper and went for four runs ending the game. The Central Districts team felt that this was very unsporting of Grant Bradburn, who was subsequently fined $100 for the incident.

== International career ==
He scored 214 on his debut, against West Indies at Wellington in 1999, and followed that with 204 not out against Pakistan in the following summer. But despite this most promising of starts, Sinclair struggled to gain a permanent place in both the Test and one-day teams after disappointing scores. As a result, he was intermittently featured in the international squad, most recently being the One Day International against the West Indies at Eden Park in January 2009.

An injury to Michael Papps in 2004–05 saw him called into the tour of Bangladesh as a 'makeshift' opener. His preferred position in the top of the middle-order was not available at the time. He did enough on that tour to gain selection for the tour to Australia where he had mixed results in the Tests, but not enough to maintain his spot when the Australians crossed the Tasman later that summer.

His form in the ODIs in Australia was sufficient to retain his place for the return series, but he lost his place after averaging 15 in the first three matches.

== Retirement ==
In July 2013 he announced his retirement from all cricket. At 37, after 18 seasons in the Central Districts team he is the team's all-time highest run-scorer, with more than 20,000 runs across all formats and remained a solid performer to the last, averaging over 40 in 2012–13. Sinclair found the transition from a cricketer to working outside of cricket very difficult. He worked in a sports shop for eight months before being made redundant. He now works as a real estate agent. In 2020, he played club cricket in Napier.
