= Michael Bates (New Zealand cricketer) =

New Zealand cricketer (born 1983)

Personal information
- Full name: Michael David Bates
- Born: 11 October 1983 (age 43); Auckland, New Zealand
- Batting: Right-handed
- Bowling: Left-arm medium

International information
- National side: New Zealand
- ODI debut (cap 172): 9 February 2012 v Zimbabwe
- Last ODI: 3 March 2012 v South Africa
- T20I debut (cap 51): 11 February 2012 v Zimbabwe
- Last T20I: 22 February 2012 v South Africa

Career statistics
Competition	ODI	T20I	FC	LA
Matches	2	3	35	26
Runs scored	13	–	563	87
Batting average	13.00	–	20.85	14.50
100s/50s	0/0	–	0/3	7/26
Top score	13	–	69*	17
Balls bowled	84	66	5,882	1,236
Wickets	2	4	95	34
Bowling average	26.00	26.75	29.62	31.88
5 wickets in innings	0	0	4	1
10 wickets in match	0	0	0	0
Best bowling	1/24	3/31	6/55	5/36
Catches/stumpings	1/–	0/–	8/–	7/–
- Source: Cricinfo, 28 November 2012

Michael David Bates (born 11 October 1983) is a New Zealand cricketer. He is a left-arm, medium-pace bowler who bats right-handed. He was a member of the New Zealand Under 19 side in the 2002 Under 19 Cricket World Cup, and has played for the Auckland Aces since 2003. Bates has the record for most runs conceded in a game of domestic Twenty20 cricket with 64 runs scored off his 4 overs bowled, although getting 3 wickets in his last over.

== International career ==
Bates made his ODI and T20I debut for the New Zealand Blackcaps in February 2012 against Zimbabwe. He is the brother of former All Black Steven Bates.
