= Craig Cumming =

New Zealand cricketer

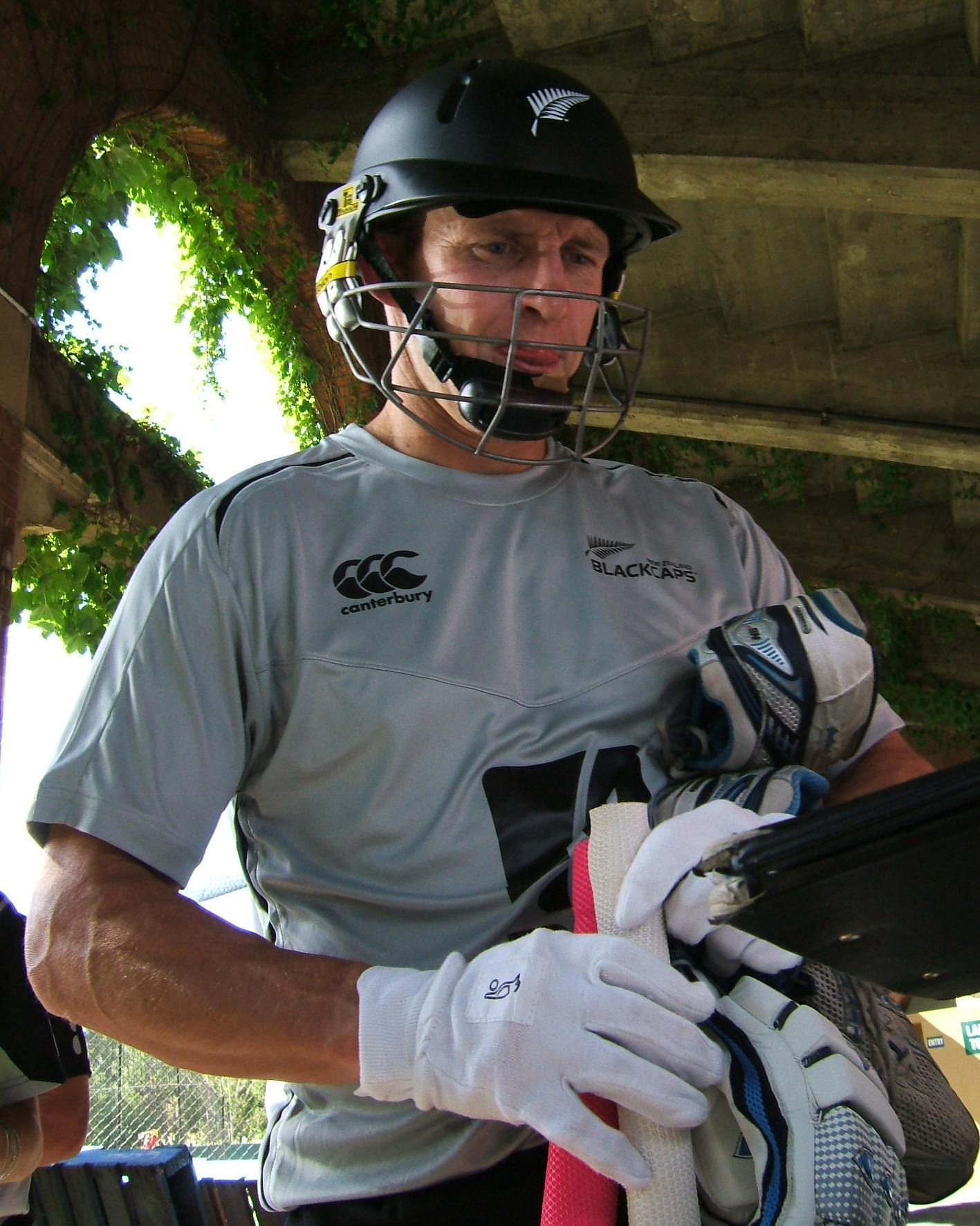

Personal information
- Full name: Craig Derek Cumming
- Born: 13 August 1975 (age 51); Timaru, Canterbury, New Zealand
- Batting: Right-handed
- Bowling: Right-arm medium
- Role: Opening batsman
- Relatives: Jacob Cumming (son)

International information
- National side: New Zealand (2003–2009)
- Test debut (cap 228): 10 March 2005 v Australia
- Last Test: 12 January 2008 v Bangladesh
- ODI debut (cap 130): 29 November 2003 v Pakistan
- Last ODI: 10 February 2009 v Australia
- ODI shirt no.: 13

Domestic team information
- Years: Team
- 1993/94–1999/00: Canterbury
- 2000/01–2011/12: Otago

Career statistics
Competition	Test	ODI	FC	LA
Matches	11	13	121	122
Runs scored	441	161	7,154	2,810
Batting average	25.94	13.31	36.13	25.77
100s/50s	0/1	0/0	16/33	3/15
Top score	74	45*	187	112
Balls bowled	–	18	3,629	2,494
Wickets	–	0	31	40
Bowling average	–	–	53.48	47.85
5 wickets in innings	–	–	0	0
10 wickets in match	–	–	0	0
Best bowling	–	–	3/31	2/18
Catches/stumpings	3/–	6/–	53/–	53/–
- Source: Cricinfo, 16 April 2017

Craig Derek Cumming (born 31 August 1975) is a New Zealand former international cricketer. He played 11 Test matches and 13 One Day Internationals for the New Zealand national team. He played domestic cricket with Canterbury and Otago.

== Domestic career ==
Cumming, who was born at Timaru, played as a right-handed opening batsman. He played for Canterbury early in his career. He played for South Canterbury in the Hawke Cup and later moved to play for Otago in senior cricket.

== International career ==
Cumming had a largely unsuccessful international test career, playing only 11 tests before being dropped due to lack of batting ability. He only made one half-century – a top score of 74 – and failed to reach three figures in any of his test innings. On 5 March 2005 against Australia, he was the recipient of what is considered the fastest ever ball bowled in New Zealand, bowled by Brett Lee, in which he clocked 160.8 km/h (99.9 mph) at Napier as the fastest delivery of the over.

== After cricket ==
Cumming worked as a broadcaster for Newstalk ZB in Dunedin hosting local sports shows and producing 'The Country'. He was also one of the domestic Sky Sport commentator for domestic cricket and international home matches.

Cumming spent four years as head coach at Otago Sparks, before being appointed to the same role at English women's club of The Blaze in December 2024.
