= Kruger van Wyk =

New Zealand cricketer

Personal information
- Full name: Cornelius Francois Kruger van Wyk
- Born: 7 February 1980 (age 46); Wolmaransstad, Transvaal Province, South Africa
- Batting: Right-handed
- Role: Wicket-keeper

International information
- National side: New Zealand
- Test debut (cap 255): 7 March 2012 v South Africa
- Last Test: 29 November 2012 v Sri Lanka

Domestic team information
- Years: Team
- 2000/01–2005/06: Northerns
- 2004/05–2005/06: Titans
- 2006/07–2009/10: Canterbury
- 2010/11–2015/16: Central Districts

Career statistics
| Competition | Test | FC | LA | T20 |
|---|---|---|---|---|
| Matches | 9 | 138 | 141 | 80 |
| Runs scored | 341 | 6,734 | 2,624 | 877 |
| Batting average | 21.31 | 37.59 | 38.73 | 21.39 |
| 100s/50s | 0/1 | 7/41 | 1/14 | 0/1 |
| Top score | 71 | 178* | 114* | 59* |
| Catches/stumpings | 23/1 | 415/20 | 158/20 | 43/15 |
- Source: Cricinfo, 20 March 2017

Cornelius Francoius Kruger van Wyk (born 7 February 1980) is a former New Zealand cricketer who plays for the Central Districts Stags. He is a wicket-keeper-batsman. He has played professionally in South Africa and New Zealand, and at club level in Scotland. He attended Afrikaanse Hoër Seunskool (Afrikaans High School for Boys, also known as Affies), a popular and renowned public school located in Pretoria.

== Domestic career ==
Born and raised in South Africa, van Wyk started his first class career with Northerns in 2000/01 season. However, any hope of breaking into the South African team was diminished by Mark Boucher's long-term hold on the position. He moved to New Zealand on the encouragement of his coach, and started playing for the Canterbury Wizards from the 2006/07 season.

Van Wyk captained the Canterbury Wizards in the 2008 season in which they won the first class State Championship title. He was awarded the Canterbury Wizards player of the year for the 2007/8 season. He captained the Wizards until 2010, when he signed for the Central Districts Stags. In the New Zealand winter he has played professionally in Scotland for West Lothian County Cricket Association who have since been renamed Linlithgow Cricket Club.

== International career ==
On 16 January 2012, van Wyk was named in the New Zealand cricket squad to play Zimbabwe in a one-off test match commencing 26 January 2012. Kruger van Wyk was named to make his test debut later that summer against his former country after BJ Watling was ruled out with a hip injury.

== Retirement ==
In December 2015, he announced his retirement from all forms of cricket, to take up the role of Director of Cricket at the University of Pretoria's TuksCricket Academy.
