= Michael Mason (cricketer) =

New Zealand cricketer

Personal information
- Full name: Michael James Mason
- Born: 27 August 1974 (age 52); Carterton, Wellington, New Zealand
- Batting: Right-handed
- Bowling: Right-arm fast-medium

International information
- National side: New Zealand (2003–2010)
- Only Test (cap 226): 26 March 2004 v South Africa
- ODI debut (cap 133): 29 November 2003 v Pakistan
- Last ODI: 9 March 2010 v Australia
- T20I debut (cap 23): 26 December 2006 v Sri Lanka
- Last T20I: 13 June 2008 v England

Domestic team information
- Years: Team
- 1997/98–2011/12: Central Districts

Career statistics
Competition	Test	ODI	FC	LA
Matches	1	26	91	134
Runs scored	3	24	1,341	349
Batting average	1.50	8.00	16.15	10.26
100s/50s	0/0	0/0	0/2	0/0
Top score	3	13*	65	41*
Balls bowled	132	1,179	17,074	6,331
Wickets	0	31	288	180
Bowling average	–	33.03	25.15	26.56
5 wickets in innings	–	0	13	1
10 wickets in match	–	0	1	0
Best bowling	–	4/24	6/20	6/25
Catches/stumpings	0/–	4/–	18/–	29/–
- Source: ESPNcricinfo, 13 January 2019

Michael James Mason (born 27 August 1974) is a former New Zealand cricketer, born in Carterton. He played Test matches and One Day Internationals for New Zealand.

== Domestic career ==
He played domestic cricket for Central Districts. After recovering from an operation on a hernia during late 2008, he was back playing domestic cricket. He was also signed by the Kings XI Punjab for the Pepsi IPL 2013 as a replacement for the injured Ryan Harris. Mason's last match for Central Districts was on 12 February 2012. About a month before his retirement from the Central Districts, Mason helped complete what The West Australian thought might be a candidate for the "greatest cricket catch ever" by collaborating with teammate Bevan Small.

Small, while fielding as the 12th man in January 2012 during the New Zealand domestic HRV Twenty20 competition (currently known as the Super Smash) as a 19-year-old, made a spectacular catch assist on the boundary line; Mason, who was 37 at the time, completed the catch. The Laws of Cricket indicate that a catch can be initiated outside of the boundary line so long as the player is airborne whenever they are touching the ball; this must remain so until the ball is back inside the boundary (either completed by the same player or, as was the case with Small and Mason, completed by a teammate). A commentator during the match called it "possibly the most brilliant piece of fielding I've ever seen". The video has received millions of views across various online uploads.

In 2009, Mason was part of the New Zealand A vs the England Lions at Pukekura Park, where New Zealand A won the match.

== International career ==
Michael Mason was part of the New Zealand squad for the tour of England in 2008. He took 3 wickets against Essex and was 12th man against England Lions. He was part of the New Zealand squad for the 2007 Cricket World Cup.

== After cricket ==
Following retirement in 2012, Mason began coaching the Manawatu senior team and Palmerston North junior rep teams.
