= Chris Martin (cricketer) =

New Zealand cricketer

Personal information
- Full name: Christopher Stewart Martin
- Born: 10 December 1974 (age 51); Christchurch, New Zealand
- Nickname: The Phantom, The Walking Wicket, Tommy
- Height: 1.86 m (6 ft 1 in)
- Batting: Right-handed
- Bowling: Right-arm fast-medium
- Role: Bowler

International information
- National side: New Zealand (2000–2013)
- Test debut (cap 211): 17 November 2000 v South Africa
- Last Test: 2 January 2013 v South Africa
- ODI debut (cap 119): 2 January 2001 v Zimbabwe
- Last ODI: 23 February 2008 v England
- T20I debut (cap 24): 12 September 2007 v Kenya
- Last T20I: 7 February 2008 v England

Domestic team information
- Years: Team
- 1997/98–2004/05: Canterbury
- 2005/06–2008/09: Auckland
- 2008: Warwickshire
- 2009/10: Canterbury
- 2010: Essex
- 2010/11–2012/13: Auckland

Career statistics
Competition	Test	ODI	FC	LA
Matches	71	20	192	142
Runs scored	123	8	479	86
Batting average	2.36	1.60	3.71	2.86
100s/50s	0/0	0/0	0/0	0/0
Top score	12*	3	25	13
Balls bowled	14,026	948	36,858	6,920
Wickets	233	18	599	193
Bowling average	33.81	44.66	31.83	29.16
5 wickets in innings	10	0	23	3
10 wickets in match	1	0	1	0
Best bowling	6/26	3/62	6/26	6/24
Catches/stumpings	14/–	7/–	34/–	28/–
- Source: ESPNcricinfo, 13 January 2019

Christopher Stewart Martin (born 10 December 1974) is a former New Zealand cricketer. A right-arm fast-medium bowler, Martin played provincial cricket for Auckland, having formerly played for the Canterbury Wizards.

He also signed for the English county cricket side, Warwickshire, for their 2008 domestic campaign and played one first-class match for Essex in 2010. In 1999 he played a season of club cricket in Scotland for Heriots FP Cricket Club.

He retired from all cricket in late 2013.

== International career ==
Martin is one of seven New Zealand Test cricketers to have taken 200 wickets. In 2011 he was recognised as New Zealand's premier cricketer, when he was awarded the inaugural Sir Richard Hadlee Medal, at the New Zealand cricket awards ceremony. Although predominantly a Test bowler, Martin moved back into contention for One Day Internationals after International Cricket Council rule changes permitted substitutions during games. Although the rule has since been revoked, Martin has remained on the fringes of the ODI squad and was called up to the New Zealand World Cup 2007 squad, as a replacement for the injured Daryl Tuffey.

=== Batting ability ===
Martin was well known for being an extremely poor batsman, even by the low standards generally expected of tail-end batsman, and his batting gained him more publicity than his bowling. Martin has the rather dubious distinction of belonging to a select group of cricketers whose number of wickets taken exceeds runs scored; Bhagwat Chandrasekhar is the only other cricketer to meet this distinction (assuming a qualification of 30 Tests played), and only Holcombe "Hopper" Read – who played when pitches were uncovered – has played Test cricket and finished with a lower first-class batting average than Martin. Martin failed to score a run in Test Cricket from December 2, 2000 to March 26, 2004, during which time he took 41 Test wickets. Martin holds the record for the most pairs recorded in Test match history (7). He is also the only cricketer to be dismissed for a diamond duck (run out on 0 without facing a ball) twice in Test cricket – against England in 2004 and South Africa in 2013.

On 9 January 2011, Martin notched up the milestone of 100 career Test match runs in the 1st Test against Pakistan at Seddon Park. He took his 500th wicket in first-class cricket, with the dismissal of Tanvir Ahmed on the third day of the first Test against Pakistan in January 2011.

== Retirement ==
Martin's final year of professional cricket was 2013; playing his last Test Match in January, his last First Class game in February (ending on 599 wickets), and his last List A (and professional) game on March 31, before announcing his retirement from all forms of cricket on July 3. Martin bowed out as the third highest Test wicket-taker in New Zealand's history with 233 scalps behind Richard Hadlee (431) and Daniel Vettori (362). As of October 2026, he sits at 6th, having been overtaken by the contemporary trio of Tim Southee (391), Trent Boult (317) and Neil Wagner (260).
