= Hannan (surname) =

Hannan and Hannon are Irish surnames.

== People ==
People with the surname Hannan or Hannon include:

- Albert James Hannan (1887–1965), South Australian Crown Solicitor
- Brian Hannon (1936–2022), Church of Ireland clergyman
- Chick Hannan (1901–1980), American actor and radio performer
- Chris Hannon (born 1984), American football player
- Daniel Hannan (born 1971), Member of the European Parliament (MEP), British Conservative Party politician
- Dave Hannan (born 1961), Canadian professional hockey player
- Dinny Hannon Denis J. Hannon (1888–1971), Irish Footballer
- Edward J. Hannan (1921–1994), Australian statistician
- Edward Joseph Hannan (1836–1891), Irish priest, founded Hibernian F.C.
- Ezra Hannon, pseudonym used by the author best known as Ed McBain
- Fiona Hannan aka Fiona Robinson (born 1969), Australian basketball and handball player
- Geoff Hannan (born 1972), British composer and musician
- George Hannan (1910–2009), Australian politician
- Jerome Daniel Hannan (1896–1965), American prelate of the Roman Catholic Church
- Jim Hannan (1940–2024), American baseball player
- Jim Hannan (rugby union) (1864–1905), Welsh international rugby player
- Jimmy Hannan (1934–2019), Australian singer and TV personality
- Joseph Hannan (1873–1943), Australian politician and trade unionist
- Kemp Hannon (born 1946), American politician, member of the New York State Senate
- Kevin Hannan (1954–2008), American ethnolinguist and Slavicist
- M. A. Hannan (1930–1974), Bangladeshi politician
- Mary Josephine Hannan (c. 1865–c. 1935), medical doctor, first Irishwoman to graduate LRCPI & SI and LM
- Melissa Hannan, Australian pageant winner and TV personality
- Michael Hannan (disambiguation), several people, including

- Michael Hannan (bishop) (1821–1882), Roman Catholic priest and archbishop.
- Michael Hannan (composer) (born 1949), Australian composer, keyboardist, and musicologist
- Michael T. Hannan (born 1943), American sociologist

- Mitch Hannan (born 1994), Australian rules footballer
- Neil Hannon (born 1970), Irish singer with pop group "The Divine Comedy", son of Brian Hannon
- Paddy Hannan, Patrick Hannan (c. 1840–1925), gold prospector of Kalgoorlie, Western Australia
- Pat Hannan (1884–1957), New Zealand rower
- Patrick Hannon (1874–1963), British politician
- Peter Hannan (disambiguation), several people, including

- Peter Hannan (composer) (born 1953), Canadian composer and recorder player
- Peter Hannan (footballer) (1908–1938), Australian rules footballer
- Peter Hannan (producer) (born 1954), television producer, writer, and singer-songwriter
- see also Peter Hanan (1915–2008), New Zealand swimmer

- Philip Hannan (1913–2011), American Roman Catholic archbishop
- Richard Hannon Sr. (born 1945), British horse trainer
- Richard Hannon Jr. (born 1975), British horse trainer
- Sara Hannan (born 1961), American politician
- Scott Hannan (born 1979), professional hockey player in the NHL
- Stephanie Hannon (born 1974), American political operative
- Thomas Hannan (activist) (1950–1991), opera singer and HIV/AIDS activist
- Thomas Hannan (Virginia settler) (1757–1835), American settler and Revolutionary War soldier
- Tommy Hannan (born 1980), American Olympic swimmer
- Tina Hannan, United Kingdom writer
- William Hannan (1906–1987), Labour Member of Parliament in the United Kingdom
- William Hannon (1879–1950), president of St. Ambrose University

Hannon may also refer to:

- Point Hannon, a sand spit in Hood Canal

== See also ==
- Hanon
- Hanlon
- Hanno
