= Hanlon =

Hanlon is a surname often associated with, but not necessarily tied to, the O'Hanlon Sept. The name may denote:

- Adrian Hanlon, Irish Gaelic footballer
- Alf Hanlon (1866–1944), New Zealand lawyer
- Alison Hanlon, Irish veterinary research scientist
- Alma Hanlon (1890–1977), American silent film actress
- Arthur Hanlon, American pianist, songwriter, and arranger
- Bill Hanlon (1876–1905), American baseball player
- Brian Hanlon, American sculptor
- C. Rollins Hanlon (1915–2011), American cardiac surgeon
- Charles Hanlon (1918–1990), American politician
- Colin Hanlon, American actor
- Dan Hanlon (1886–1951), American silent film actor
- Darren Hanlon, Australian folk musician
- Donie Hanlon (1937–2023), Irish Gaelic footballer
- Edward Hanlon (disambiguation) (or Ned), several people
- George Hanlon (1917–2010), Australian horse trainer
- Jerry Hanlon (1929–2026), American football player, coach, and radio broadcaster
- Glen Hanlon (born 1957), Canadian ice hockey player and coach
- Gordon B. Hanlon (died 1973), American stockbroker
- Gregory Hanlon (born 1953), Canadian historian
- Heidi Hanlon (born 1958), Canadian curler
- Henry Hanlon (1862–1937), English Roman Catholic bishop
- Jack Hanlon (1916–2012), American child actor
- James Hanlon (disambiguation), several people
- John Hanlon (disambiguation) (or Jack), several people
- Joseph Hanlon (born 1941), British journalist and social scientist
- Josh Hanlon (born 1997), Australian Paralympic alpine skier
- Kara Hanlon (born 1997), Scottish swimmer
- Keith Hanlon (born 1966), Irish archer
- Lizzie Hanlon (born 2001), English rugby union player
- Lorraine Hanlon (born 1946), American figure skater
- Mark Hanlon, American film director and screenwriter
- Marie Hanlon (born 1948), Irish artist
- Michael Hanlon (1964–2016), British science writer
- Michelle Hanlon (born 1965), American space lawyer
- Monique Hanlon (born 2004), Australian sprinter
- Pat Hanlon (1930–2014), Australian politician
- Paul Hanlon (born 1990), Scottish footballer
- Peter Hanlon (disambiguation), several people
- Philip J. Hanlon, American mathematician and President of Dartmouth College
- Richie Hanlon, fictional character from the TV series Oz
- Ritchie Hanlon (born 1978), English football player and manager
- Roger Hanlon (born 1947), American marine biologist
- Stephen Hanlon (born 1941), American Civil rights attorney and public defender reformer
- Stuart Hanlon, American attorney
- Tara Hanlon (born 1998), Irish rower
- Terri Hanlon (born 1953), American media artist
- Tomm Hanlon (disambiguation), several people
- Toma Hanlon (c. 1867–1929), American actress, singer, and songwriter
- Wally Hanlon (1919–1999), Scottish footballer

== See also ==
- Hannon
- O'Hanlon
- Hanlon's razor
- Hanlon Brothers
