= John Franklin Kinney =

American lawyer (1860–1934)

John Franklin Kinney (June 20, 1860 – May 8, 1934) of Rochester, New York was a New York State jurist and Democratic Party operative of the late 19th and early 20th centuries, described as one of "the strong men of the Democratic Party, potent in counsel, a trusted leader and a popular campaign orator."

== Early & Family Life ==
Known in Upstate New York as "The Judge", Kinney was born in Ogden Township, Monroe County, New York on June 20, 1860. His parents were William Deegan Kinney (1833–1888) and Julia Hough Kinney, of Adams Basin and later of Spencerport, New York. William D. Kinney was a Democratic activist, clerk of the town of Ogden, and weighmaster on the Erie Canal at Rochester from 1878 to 1879. The elder Kinney emigrated from Nappanee, Ontario in 1855, having settled at Erinville, Ontario during the Great Famine. The family was native to Coolkenno on the Wicklow–Carlow county border, Leinster Province, in the years when Ireland was still a colony of the United Kingdom.

Maternally, Judge Kinney's family were from Ballina, Co. Tipperary. They settled at Herkimer, New York during the same period. Both families anglicized their names from "Kenny" to "Kinney" and "Hough" to "Howe" in order to mitigate discrimination and assimilate within the American Protestant majority. Kinney's great uncle, John Howe of Boston, mustered and fought with the 28th Massachusetts Infantry Regiment during the American Civil War (1861–1865); his cousin James Howe of Herkimer mustered with the 22nd Regiment Massachusetts Volunteer Infantry. He was also a first cousin to the Rev. John J. Cavanaugh, president of Notre Dame University, and his brother, the Rev. Frank Cavanaugh. His granddaughter, Mrs. Captain Donald J. Meyer, USN, was sister-in-law to Mrs. George A. Meyer, niece to the Rev. Edward B. Bunn, S.J., president and chancellor of Georgetown University. John F. Kinney himself was educated at the public Union School of Spencerport, New York and took the collegiate course at Saint Joseph's College, Buffalo, New York (later Niagara University). He read the law with William H. Bowman and then matriculated at the Albany Law School, boarding with the Edward and Mary (Foohy) Hanlon family on Eagle Street, Albany, next to the Cathedral of the Immaculate Conception. His brother-in-law was the Reverend John J. Hanlon.

Graduating from law school in 1881, Judge Kinney returned to Rochester and was admitted to the bar. He practiced law. In 1883, he married Elizabeth "Libbie" J. Hanlon, daughter of his landlady during his studies at Albany Law School. The Hanlons were native to County Armagh. The Kinney family would eventually include eldest son, William Edward Kinney, an engineer and Rochester public works contractor; Helen Regina Kinney, a health care worker; John Joseph Kinney (spouse first to Marie Elizabeth Tobin and after her death, Kathryn J. Fitzsimmons), an engineer with the City of Rochester; and Dora Ellen Kinney, an instructor.

== Professional and political career ==
His early practice included serving as a Referee in Bankruptcy. Upon the resignation of Special County Judge William E. Werner, Governor David B. Hill appointed John F. Kinney to the Monroe County bench in 1890. In 1892, Judge Kinney served as one of the founders of the Bar Association, City of Rochester. The Democratic Party's caucus nominated him for the same position in the next election, a ballot season which ended in the defeat of all Democrats on the ticket but for Judge Kinney. Kinney was accordingly the first Democrat elected to county-wide office in eight years (1882–1890).

During the 1893 electoral season, Judge Kinney served as delegate for the New York State Democratic Party's Monroe County, Second Assembly District, representing county interests at the party convention held at Saratoga Springs. Two years later, the Democratic Party in Monroe County had dissolved into feuding factions, necessitating intervention by State officials. Judge Kinney led one of the four factions, called the Page County Committee. It advanced the candidacies of three local politicians (Tracy, Kelly and Houck). Other factions were represented by the Cleveland Legion, the Flower City Democracy movement, and the Smith County Committee. On the State committee mediating the party fight was Cord Meyer of Queens County, New York, whose grandson was Cord Meyer, Jr. In 1904, Kinney served as Chairman, Central Committee of the Democratic Party, Monroe County. One of his chief antagonists in Rochester politics and in the practice of law was Thomas Raines.

In private practice, Judge Kinney took on cases contentious in nature. Though a personal friend and business partner with Rochester's Mayor George Washington Aldridge, Kinney was also the attorney to which plaintiffs not well-connected would bring their cases. These often dealt with corruptly managed public contracts, such as the one Judge Kinney took to the United States Supreme Court via Moffett, Hodgkins & Clarke Co. v. City of Rochester. His later cases also reflect a free market preference and a disdain for Progressive-era regulation, including reasonable restrictions against business in the interest of public health. Kinney also represented milk and oleomargarine producers facing State prosecution over food quality-related transgressions. Judge Kinney stepped down from the bench after he was appointed Corporation Counsel for the City of Rochester in 1898. He served as head of the City's legal department through 1903. Many of his cases focused on Rochester's growth, and the need for infrastructure to support its industrializing population. As Corporation Counsel, he hired attorney and future Corporation Counsel Benjamin B. Cunningham. Cunningham would go on to be opposing counsel against the Judge in the renowned "Damaged Goods" case. In April 1901, the Judge joined with other Rochester businessmen – including Mayor George Washington Aldridge – in founding the Genesee & Orleans Railway Company headquartered at Albion, New York. The electric railway was designed to support the burgeoning tourist industry at Point Breeze, Lake Ontario with a twenty-seven (27) mile track from Batavia, New York northward to the lake.

== Member ==
Kinney was a founding member of the Knights of Columbus and a long-standing member of the Society of the Friendly Sons of Saint Patrick. He also served as treasurer on the Grand Council of New York State, Catholic Mutual Benefit Association. He was a communicant at St. John the Evangelist's Church at Spencerport, New York and old St. Patrick's Cathedral in downtown Rochester.
