= Albert Dewes =

New Zealand cricketer

Personal information
- Full name: Albert Evelyn Dewes
- Born: April 1860; Nuneaton, Warwickshire, England
- Died: 5 July 1892 (aged 32); Parnell, Auckland, New Zealand
- Role: Wicket-keeper

Domestic team information
- Years: Team
- 1882/83–1883/84: Auckland
- Source: Cricinfo, 5 June 2016

Albert Evelyn Dewes (April 1860 – 5 July 1892) was a New Zealand cricketer of the 1880s, born in England.

Dewes played two first-class matches for Auckland in 1882 and 1883. In his second match he took five catches in the second innings, setting a New Zealand first-class record for dismissals in an innings that was not equalled until the 1903–04 season (by George Schmoll) and not beaten until 1964–65 (by Robin Schofield).

Dewes had arrived in New Zealand from England in the early 1880s. He worked as a solicitor in Auckland. He died at his home in the Auckland suburb of Parnell of influenza and tuberculosis, aged 32, leaving a widow and four young daughters.
