= O'Hanlon =

O'Hanlon is an Irish surname associated with the Ó hAnluain sept. As with other similar names, the added prefix "O'" means "son of" (Hanlon).

Notable people with that surname include:

- Ardal O'Hanlon (born 1965), Irish comedian
- Cressida O'Hanlon (born 1972), Australian politician
- Evan O'Hanlon (born 1988), Australian Paralympian
- Fergal O'Hanlon (1936–1957), Irish Republican Army member
- Fran O'Hanlon (born 1948), American basketball coach
- George O'Hanlon (1912–1989), American actor
- John O'Hanlon (chess player) (1876–1960), Irish chess master
- John O'Hanlon (Lackaghmore) (1889–1920), Sinn Féin member shot during the Irish War of Independence
- John O'Hanlon (politician) (1872–1956), Irish politician and journalist
- John O'Hanlon (writer) (1821–1905), Irish priest and writer
- Killian O'Hanlon (born 1993), Gaelic footballer
- Michael E. O'Hanlon (born 1961), American policy consultant
- Michael F. O'Hanlon (1890–1967), Irish politician
- Paddy O'Hanlon (1944–2009), Irish politician
- Pat O'Hanlon, (born 1991), Australian rugby player
- Redmond O'Hanlon (born 1947), British writer
- Redmond O'Hanlon (outlaw) (c. 1640 – 1681), Irish rapparee
- Rory O'Hanlon (1934–2026), Irish politician
- Rory O'Hanlon (Irish judge) (1923–2002), Irish judge
- Siobhán O'Hanlon (1963–2006), Irish politician
- Virginia O'Hanlon (1889–1971), American educator and catalyst for "Yes, Virginia, there is a Santa Claus"

== See also ==
- Hanlon
