= John O'Hanlon =

John O'Hanlon may refer to:

- John O'Hanlon (chess player) (1876–1960), Irish chess master
- John O'Hanlon (politician) (1872–1956), Irish Farmers' Party/Independent/National Centre Party politician
- John O'Hanlon (Lackaghmore) (1889–1920), Sinn Féin party member who was shot dead by British forces
- John O'Hanlon (writer) (1821–1905), Irish priest and writer, known for his Lives of the Irish Saints
