= Peter Hannan =

Peter Hannan may refer to:

- Peter Hannan (cinematographer) (born 1941), Australian cinematographer
- Peter Hannan (composer) (born 1953), Canadian composer and recorder player
- Peter Hannan (footballer) (1908–1938), Australian footballer
- Peter Hannan (producer) (born 1954), television producer, writer, singer-songwriter

== See also ==
- Peter Hanan (1915–2008), New Zealand swimmer who competed at the 1938 and 1950 British Empire Games
