= Michael Hannan =

Michael Hannan may refer to:

- Michael Hannan (bishop) (1821–1882), Roman Catholic priest and archbishop
- Michael Hannan (composer) (born 1949), Australian composer, keyboardist, and musicologist
- Michael T. Hannan (born 1943), American sociologist

== See also ==
- Michael Hanna (disambiguation)
