= James Hanlon (disambiguation) =

James Hanlon is an American actor and director.

James Hanlon may also refer to:

- James Hanlon (medical doctor), Irish medical doctor
- James Patrick Hanlon, American Judge
- Jimmy Hanlon, British footballer
