= John J. Hanlon =

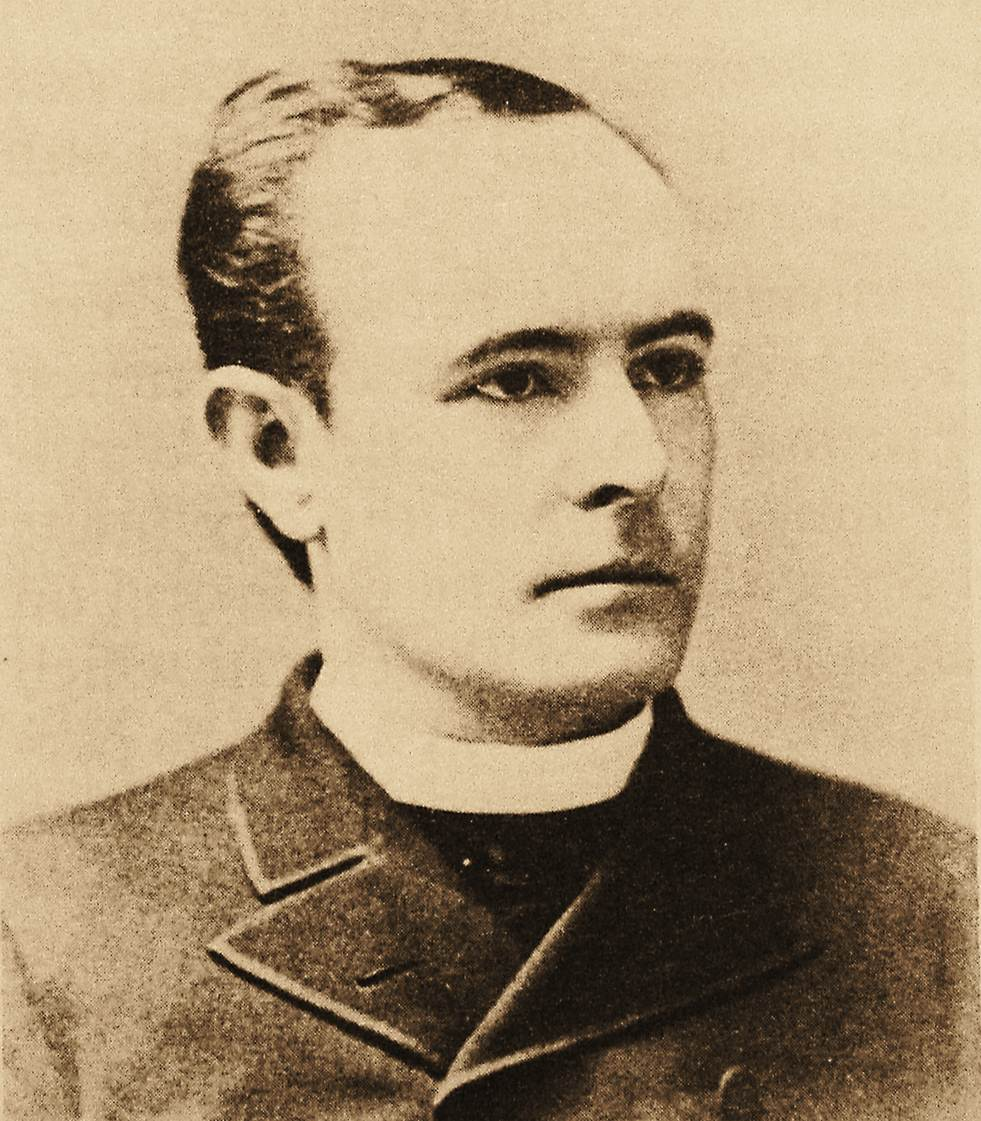
Father Hanlon, chancellor of the Archdiocese of Albany

John Joseph Hanlon (1854–1902) was an American Catholic priest who served as chancellor of the Diocese of Albany and pastor of St. Vincent De Paul Parish at Madison Avenue and Partridge Street in west Albany's Pine Hills neighborhood.

== Early & Family Life ==
Father Hanlon was born on February 10, 1854, and raised in south Albany, the son of a stonemason and contractor from Duburren, Killeavy Parish, Co. Armagh. Beginning in 1851, his father, Edward Hanlon, and grandfather, James Hanlon, conducted a stoneworks in Albany, carving monuments for Saint Agnes Cemetery and cutting, decorating and pointing stone for the Cathedral of the Immaculate Conception and other buildings, public and private. The marble and monumental works were located at the corner of Swan and State Street, Albany, and later were removed to 154 Madison Avenue, employing fifteen artisans and workers. Ellen Maguire Hanlon, his mother, was a native of Co. Fermanagh. The Hanlon home on Eagle Street later became the home of the Archbishop. His sister, Elizabeth J. Hanlon, married New York jurist and Democratic operative John Franklin Kinney.

== Education, Career & Death ==
Hanlon was educated at the Christian Brothers in Albany, and later entered Our Lady of Angels Seminary at Niagara, in 1868. Hanlon was a founder of the Basilian Literary Society (B.L.A.) and a sacristan of the Sodality of the Blessed Virgin Mary (S.B.V.M.). He graduated from the classical course in 1872 with a Bachelor of Arts. He then took a Master of Arts from the same institution. On leaving Niagara University, he matriculated at Saint Joseph's Seminary, Troy. Bishop McNeirny ordained John J. Hanlon into the priesthood of the Roman Catholic Church at the Cathedral of the Immaculate Conception on July 24, 1878. Father Hanlon was then assigned assistant pastor at St. John's Church, Syracuse. In 1879, he returned to Albany to serve as assistant at the Cathedral. He was then appointed secretary and chancellor of the diocese by Bishop McNeirney, and held that position until he was made pastor at St. Vincent de Paul in 1889, by the same bishop. Saint Vincent's was a mission church on the edge of what was then the pine hill forests west of downtown. The church's first wood-framed sanctuary had been erected originally for a Baptist congregation. Father Hanlon built a rectory alongside the existing wooden church. Shortly, Father Hanlon was one of the most popular priests in the diocese of Albany. Hanlon died on April 25, 1902, in the St. Vincent's Rectory, after a protracted illness. Dying at age 43, Father Hanlon's death stirred the Diocese leadership. His funeral was at the Cathedral of the Immaculate Conception. Following the chanting of the office of the dead by priests from throughout the diocese, Bishop Burke celebrated a pontifical high mass. He was interred at Saint Agnes Cemetery, Menands.
