= George Schmoll =

New Zealand cricketer (1870–1942)

- The Auckland team in January 1904, Schmoll standing at left

Personal information
- Full name: Gustav Ernest Schmoll
- Born: 25 November 1870; Oamaru, New Zealand
- Died: 20 October 1942 (aged 71); Wellington, New Zealand
- Batting: Right-handed
- Role: Wicketkeeper

Domestic team information
- Years: Team
- 1903/04–1905/06: Auckland
- 1910/11–1912/13: Wellington

Career statistics
Competition	First-class
Matches	7
Runs scored	84
Batting average	8.40
100s/50s	0/0
Top score	28
Catches/stumpings	10/4
- Source: Cricinfo, 23 August 2025

Gustav Ernest "George" Schmoll (25 November 1870 – 20 October 1942) was a New Zealand cricketer. He played first-class cricket for Auckland and Wellington between 1903 and 1913.

Schmoll played as a wicket-keeper. In January 1904, playing for Auckland in his second first-class match, he took four catches and a stumping in the first innings, equalling the New Zealand first-class record for dismissals in an innings that was not beaten until 1964–65 (by Robin Schofield). He moved from Auckland to Wellington in 1906. He had a high reputation as a wicket-keeper, and would probably have played more first-class cricket but for his unreliable batting.

Schmoll worked as an upholsterer.
