= Aghowle Church =

- Eaglais Achadh Abhall
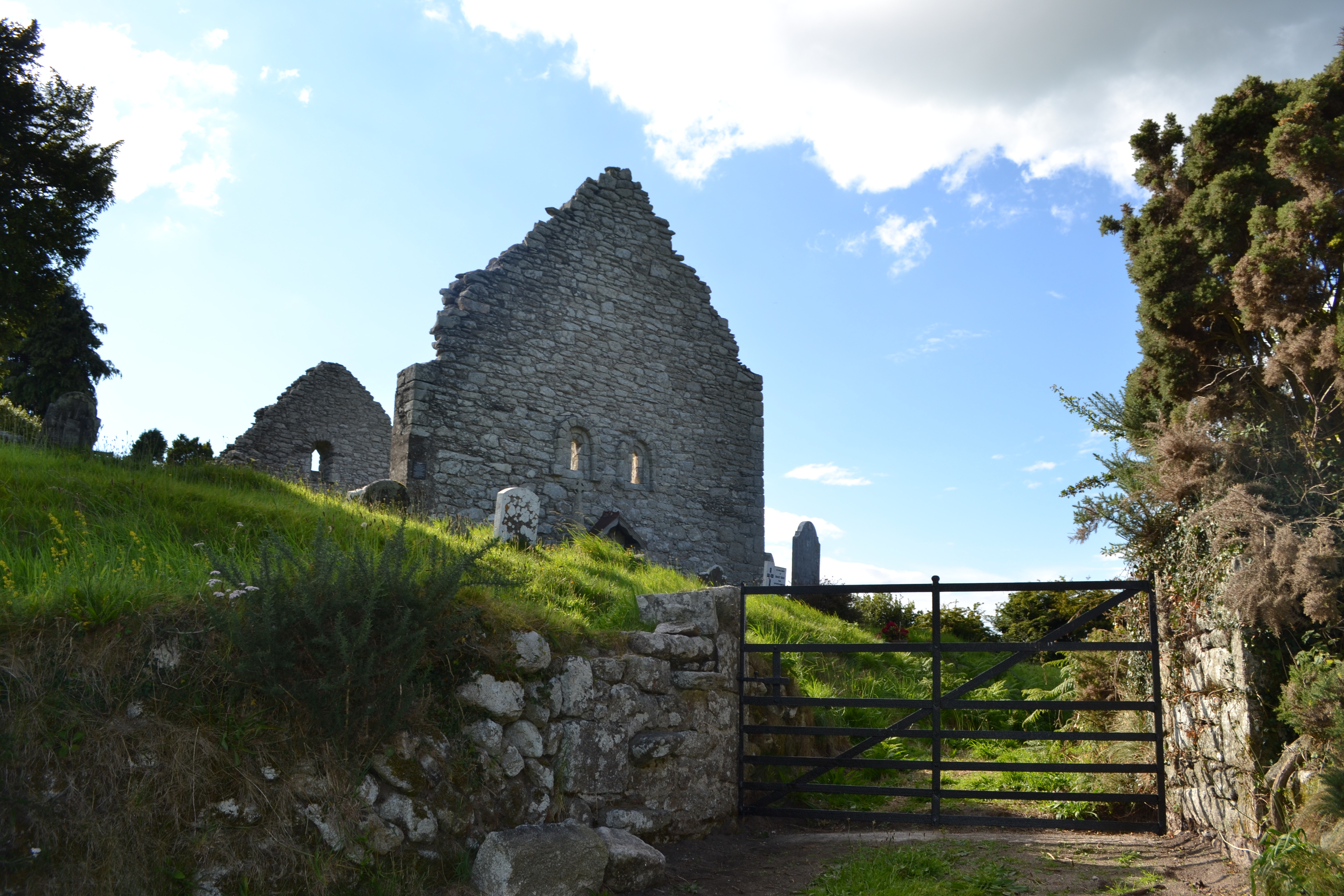

- Location within Ireland
- 52.767857°N 6.620430°W
- Location: Aghowle Lower, Coolkenno, County Wicklow
- Country: Ireland
- Denomination: Pre-Reformation Catholic; Church of Ireland

Architecture
- Style: Romanesque
- Years built: 12th century

Specifications
- Length: 18 m (59 ft)
- Width: 7.3 m (24 ft)
- Materials: stone

Administration
- Diocese: Leighlin

National monument of Ireland
- Official name: Aghowle
- Reference no.: 137

Aghowle Church is a medieval church and national monument in County Wicklow, Ireland. It was one of the largest rural parish churches of its era. Aghowle is also a civil parish in the ancient barony of Shillelagh.

== Location ==
Aghowle Church is located 1.7 km (1.1 mi) southwest of Coolkenno, near some tributaries of the River Derreen.

== History ==
It is claimed that a monastery was founded on the site by Finnian of Clonard in the 6th century. They lived in Clocháin (beehive huts) around a wooden church The placename derives from the Irish for "field of apple trees." The present church dates to c. 1100 and was in use by the Church of Ireland until 1716–17. It is the principal ecclesiastical site of the northern Ui Felmeda. The large size of the structure indicates importance but the historical record is unclear why this parish was so important.

Local legend tells of a "fugitive bell": apparently St Finnian (470–549) erected a belfry at Aghowle, but later moved the bell to his other monastery at Clonard. One day it vanished and reappeared at Aghowle, and, despite several attempts at removing it, the bell kept on returning to Aghowle.

== Church ==
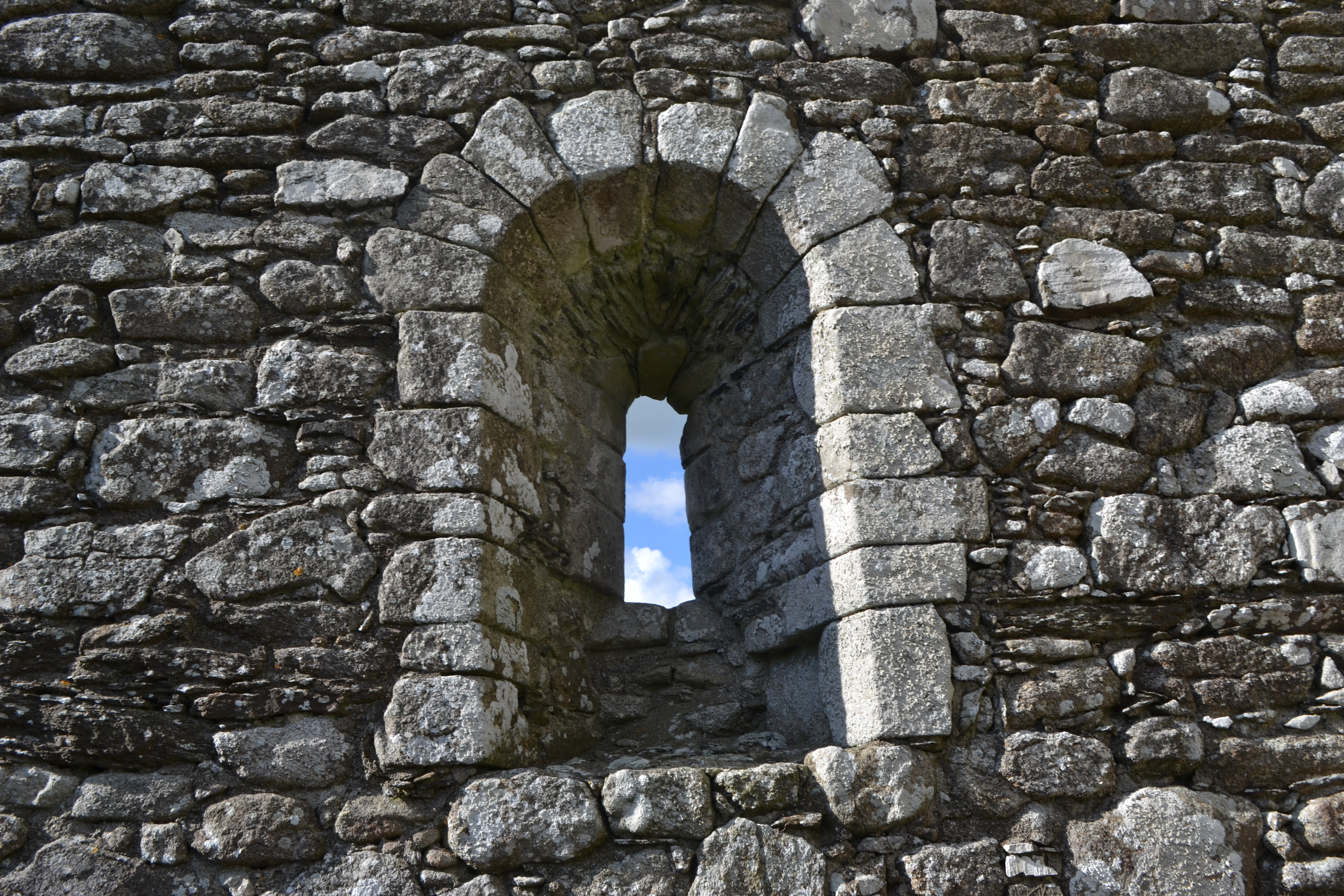
Window detail

The church is a long rectangular building with high gables of which the original north, east and west walls survive. The granite west doorway is lintelled on the outside and arched inside. It has Romanesque moulding on the outside and a draw-bar socket as well as pre-Romanesque influences. Two round-headed windows in the east wall have hood mouldings on the outside supported by pillars.

=== St Finden's Cross ===
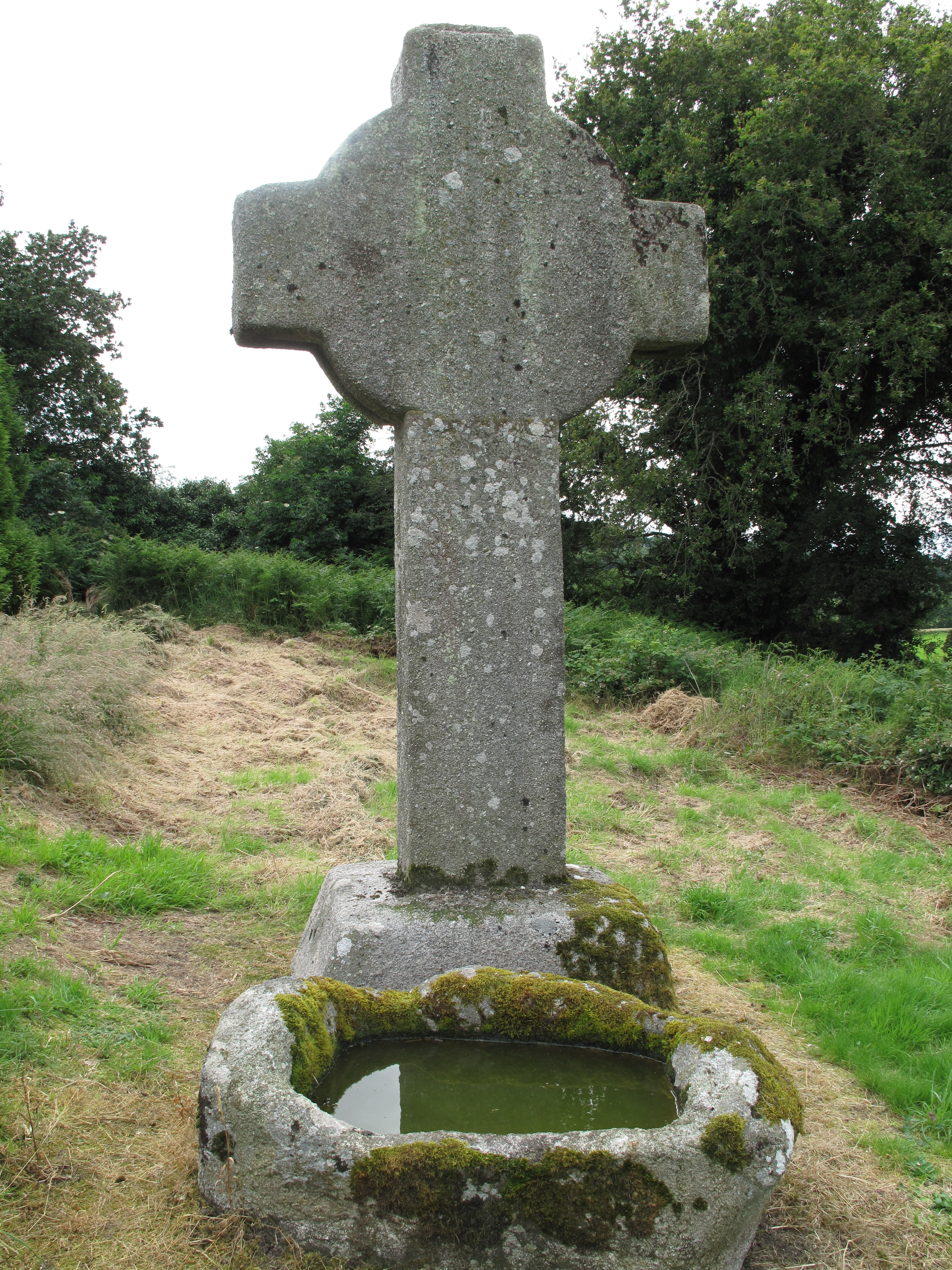
St Finden's Cross

To the northeast of the church is a 2.8 m (9 ft 2 in) high imperforate ringed granite high cross, possibly unfinished, standing on a pyramidal base known as St Finden's Cross. There are sunken panels in the shaft and underneath the arms. It dates to approximately the 10th century.

=== Font ===
Located on the eastern side of the cross is a large granite baptismal font (130 × 73 cm; 4′3″ × 2′5″) which is believed to be pre-Norman. Local tradition claimed that water from the font could cure headaches.

It is generally accepted that the use of fonts within churches became firmly established during the 12th century in Ireland, reflecting the move to a parochial and diocesan organisation of the church and the changes in liturgical conventions that this brought. It was required that the sacraments take place in a fixed baptistery inside a church. In the field to the southeast is a large bullaun stone.
