= Toma Hanlon =

American actress

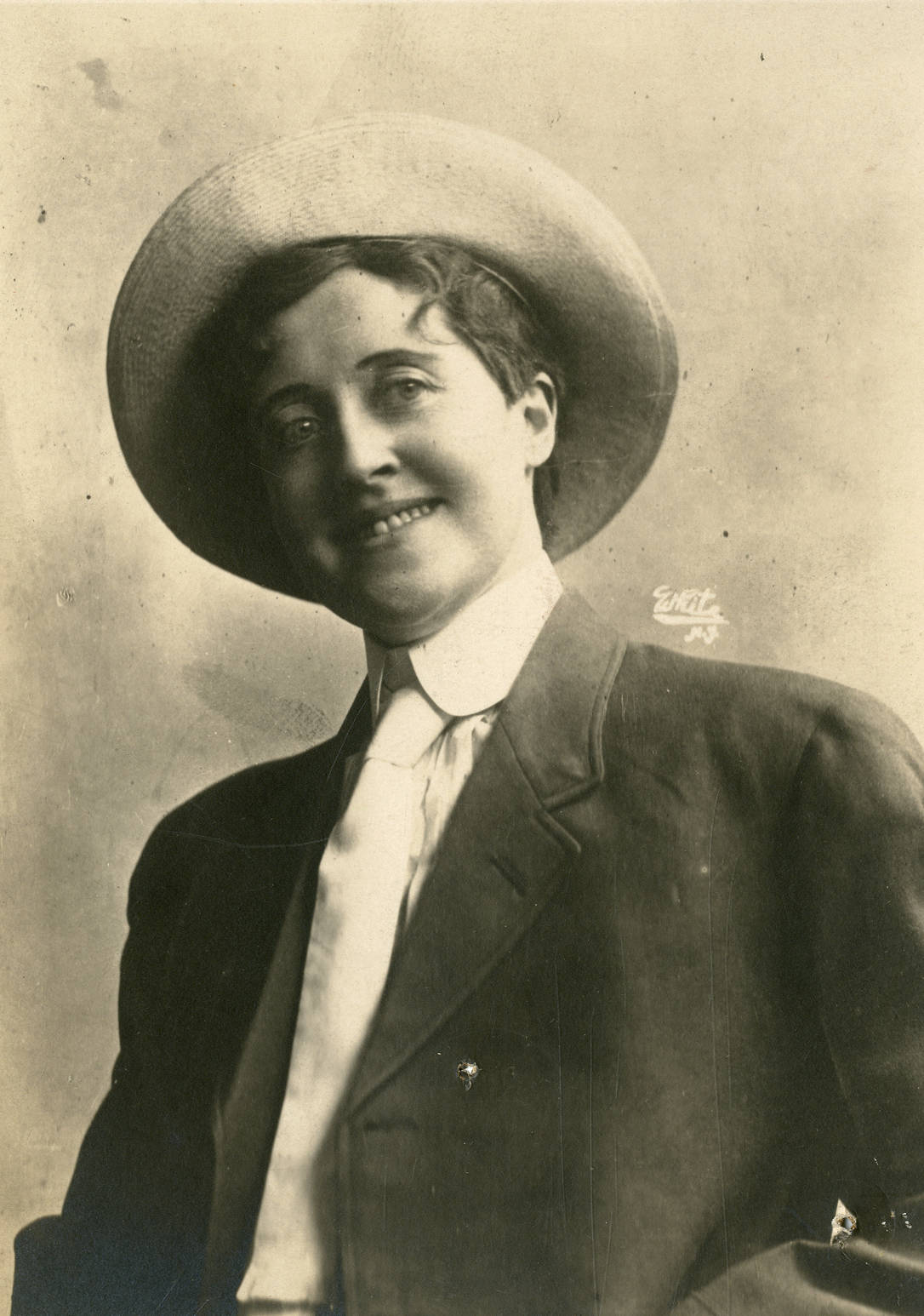
- Toma Hanlon, from a 1909 publicity photo
- Born: about 1867
- Died: November 11, 1929 (age 62); New York, New York, U.S.
- Other name: Toma Hanlon Kershaw
- Occupations: Actress, singer, comedian, male impersonator

Toma Hanlon Kershaw (about 1867 – November 11, 1929) was an American actress, singer, songwriter, and male impersonator who performed on vaudeville programs and in Broadway shows, mostly in the 1890s and 1900s.

== Early life and education ==
Hanlon was the daughter and namesake of Thomas Hanlon. Her father was born in England, and a member of the Hanlon Brothers, an acrobatic and comedy troupe. She was on stage from childhood, playing children's roles at Booth's Theatre in New York.

== Career ==
Hanlon appeared in the original production of Hendrik Hudson in 1890, with Fay Templeton in the title role. She sang in musical revues including He, She, Him, and Her (1888–1889), Her Fidelity (1893), Nadjy (1894), At Gay Coney Island (1898), Paris By Night (1904), The Maid and the Millionaire (1907), and The Belle of Avenue A (1908). "She has considerable dramatic talent, unusual to one accustomed to playing musical comedy, is pretty and vivacious and a great favorite wherever she appears," reported The Tammany Times in 1908. In 1909 the Houston Post said that "Miss Hanlon makes a very handsome man" in her act, singing "chappie" songs. In 1909 and 1910 she toured nationally in vaudeville with her impersonation act, and performed while recovering from a bout of ptomaine poisoning. She also wrote songs.

In 1904, she was called to testify at an inquest when a saloon keeper named Frank McNally died by gunshot in his apartment in Brooklyn. She admitted that they were involved, but denied having a key to his apartment or being in his company when he died.

== Publications ==
- "The Bird's Reply" (1889, words by Hanlon, music by J. Clarence West)

== Personal life ==
Hanlon was rumored to be engaged to an English actor, Gerard Warriner, in 1891. She was also rumored to be involved with her costar, George H. Adams, in 1893. She married an actor named Charles H. Clarke before her involvement with Frank McNally. She was later married to Arthur Kershaw. She was a widow when she died at Bellevue Hospital in 1929, at the age of 62, from the effects of alcoholism.
