= Michael Hanna =

Michael Hanna may refer to:

- Mike Hanna (born 1953), United States congressman
- Michael Hanna (sportsman) (1926–2024), cricketer and rugby union player
- Michael G. Hanna (born 1963), professor of neurology
- Michael Hanna (judge), Irish judge

== See also ==
- Michael Hannan (disambiguation)
