= Shane Byrne (rugby union) =

Irish rugby union player

- Born: James Shane Byrne; 18 July 1971 (age 55) Aughrim, County Wicklow
- Height: 1.78 m (5 ft 10 in)
- Weight: 101 kg (15 st 13 lb)
- School: Blackrock College

Rugby union career
- Position: Hooker
Amateur team(s)
Years	Team	Apps	(Points)
- Blackrock College RFC
Senior career
Years	Team	Apps	(Points)
1995–2005	Leinster	115	(15)
2005–2007	Saracens F.C.	49	(15)
- Correct as of 14 January 2021
International career
Years	Team	Apps	(Points)
2001–2005	Ireland	41	(15)
2005	British & Irish Lions	4	(0)
- Correct as of 6 October 2014

James Shane Byrne (born 18 July 1971) is a former Irish rugby union hooker. He is nicknamed 'Munch' or 'Mullet' (a reference to his hair style).

A native of Aughrim, County Wicklow, Byrne played Gaelic football up to under-16 level with the local Aughrim club. He attended Blackrock College in Dublin.

== Career ==
He plied his trade for many years at Leinster. His international career started comparatively late and did not blossom until the retirement of Keith Wood. When he eventually got his chance in a World Cup qualifier in Romania in 2001 he took it and thereafter became a fixture in the national side where he won 41 caps between 2001 and 2005, scoring three tries.

In February 2003 Byrne played his 100th game for Leinster.

In 2005 he was selected for the British & Irish Lions tour to New Zealand and played in the first and third tests. Byrne has scored a total of three tries for his country, scoring two of those in one match against Wales during the 2004 Six Nations series.

Following the Lions tour his contract talks with Leinster were inconclusive and he joined Saracens in the summer of 2005 for two years, before returning to Ireland.

== Personal life ==
Byrne participated in a Charity You're A Star edition on RTÉ in the Helix, DCU. His chosen charity was GOAL, an Irish founded charity group.

In June 2008, Byrne revived his GAA career with the local Aughrim club after a 17-year lapse, lining out at centre-back in a Wicklow junior 'C' league game against Coolkenno. His switch to the full-forward position did not stop Aughrim from crashing to a heavy defeat.

In June 2010, Byrne announced his involvement in RuckingBall.com, an online community for the development of school-boy rugby, coaches and parents. In April 2012, Byrne participated in an episode of Celebrity Come Dine With Me Ireland. In June 2014, Shane made his acting debut with the release of Mrs. Brown's Boys D'Movie.

Byrne is a director with Arklow Waste Disposal, his family business. He is also head of operations for Focus International Property.

Byrne has been a captain on the sports quiz show Know The Score since November 2016.

He is married to Caroline (a native of County Monaghan) and has twin girls Alex and Kerry. Byrne is the grandson of deafblind doctor James Hanlon. His daughter Kerry represented Wicklow at the 2024 Rose of Tralee International Festival.
