= Peter McGlashan =

New Zealand cricketer

Personal information
- Full name: Peter Donald McGlashan
- Born: 22 June 1979 (age 47); Napier, Hawke's Bay, New Zealand
- Batting: Right-handed
- Role: Wicket-keeper
- Relatives: Sara McGlashan (sister); Robin Schofield (grandfather)

International information
- National side: New Zealand (2006–2010)
- ODI debut (cap 154): 6 March 2009 v India
- Last ODI: 14 March 2009 v India
- ODI shirt no.: 21
- T20I debut (cap 21): 22 December 2006 v Sri Lanka
- Last T20I: 30 December 2010 v Pakistan
- T20I shirt no.: 21

Domestic team information
- Years: Team
- 1999/00–2001/02: Central Districts
- 2002/03: Otago
- 2004/05–2011/12: Northern Districts

Career statistics
Competition	ODI	T20I	FC	LA
Matches	4	11	71	99
Runs scored	63	61	2,780	2,115
Batting average	63.00	7.62	29.57	30.21
100s/50s	0/1	0/0	2/16	1/12
Top score	56*	26	115	112
Catches/stumpings	7/0	9/0	195/13	92/14
- Source: cricinfo, 22 July 2012

Peter Donald McGlashan (born 22 June 1979) is a former cricketer who represented New Zealand in 11 Twenty20 Internationals and four One Day Internationals. A right-handed wicket-keeper-batsman, he played for Central Districts, Otago and Northern Districts in domestic cricket. He is the brother of cricketer Sara McGlashan and grandson of Robin Schofield.

McGlasham was born at Napier in 1979. He was educated at Napier Boys' High School. He played over 200 top-level matches in his career.

== Retirement ==
In 2012 he retired from cricket and took a full-time job as the director of sport and wellbeing for the Glenn Family Foundation. In the 2019 New Zealand local elections, he stood for the Labour Party in the Maungakiekie-Tāmaki Local Board and was elected. McGlashan was re-elected to the Local Board in 2022, and decided not to stand again in 2025. McGlashan has also worked as a cricket commentator and in 2023 was involved in the first ever international cricket commentary broadcast in Te Reo Māori involving a match between New Zealand and Sri Lanka.
