= John Hanlon =

John Hanlon may refer to:

- John Hanlon (record producer), American record producer and recording engineer
- John Hanlon (footballer) (1892–1876), Scottish footballer with Hamilton Academical and Heart of Midlothian
- John Hanlon (singer) (born 1949), New Zealand singer and songwriter
- John Hanlon (athlete) (1905–1983), English athlete
- John J. Hanlon (1854–1902), chancellor of the Diocese of Albany
- John Stanislaus Hanlon (1883–1949), journalist and member of the Queensland Legislative Council
- John Paul "Jack" Hanlon (1913–1968), Irish priest and painter
- John Hanlon (jockey) Rode in 4 Grand Nationals between 1850 and 1867
- Johnny Hanlon (1917-2002), English footballer for Manchester United and Bury, also known as Jimmy Hanlon
