= Peter Hanlon =

Peter Hanlon may refer to:

- Peter Hanlon (boxer) (born 1959), retired British boxer
- Peter Hanlon (producer), Australian filmmaker, chair of Mercury CX in Adelaide
- Peter Hanlon (sportswriter), Australian sports journalist
