= Alison Hanlon =

Veterinary research scientist and animal welfare advocate

Alison Jane Hanlon is an Irish veterinary research scientist who advocates for animal welfare, including that of companion animals, horses and farm animals. She is a professor at University College Dublin and has worked on a number of government advisory groups.

== Career and impact ==
Hanlon is a research scientist and professor at the School of Veterinary Medicine at University College Dublin. She was part of the team that published the government report Challenges and Solutions To Supporting Farm Animal Welfare in Ireland: Responding to the Human Element.

Hanlon's early research explored different aspects of the welfare of deer as wild and farmed animals. She also investigated teaching animal welfare in vet schools, a collaboration with other notable scientists including Donald Broom. In 2008 she chaired the UFAW conference in Dublin with Temple Grandin as the keynote speaker.

Her later research includes collaborative projects exploring stakeholder perception of animal welfare and veterinary ethics. Hanlon has been appointed by the Minister for Health as a member of the National Committee for the Protection of Animals Used for Scientific Purposes and is a member of other government and specialist bodies, including:

- Associate Member of the European College of Animal Welfare and Behavioural Medicine
- Member of the Irish Government's Scientific Advisory Committee on Animal Health and Welfare
- Member of Ireland's Farm Animal Welfare Advisory Council
- Nominated as an Academic Advisor in the RCVS's Certificate in Animal Welfare, Ethics and Law
- Adviser to the Advertising Standards Association concerning animal welfare
- Past member of Dublin Zoo's Ethics Committee (2012–2017)

She is a member of the Irish Government's Scientific Advisory Council on Animal Health and Welfare, a regular contributor to the Irish Vet Journal, and is on the editorial board of the scientific journal Animals (ISSN 2076-2615). An advocate of One Welfare, she has been awarded numerous research grants and has published extensively.

In May 2021 the EU nominated a third Reference Centre for animal welfare, focusing on the welfare of ruminants and equines coordinated by Professor Harry Blokhuis at the Swedish University of Agricultural Sciences and the Swedish Centre for Animal Welfare, and also composed of university partners in Ireland (led by Hanlon), Austria, Greece, France and Italy.

=== Media ===
Hanlon's work has been quoted in the Irish Times and horse forums.

== Honours and awards ==
She gained an academic award for her work (President's Teaching Award) which was used to develop an interactive online teaching tool, animal ethics dilemma, which is used by veterinary and animal science students worldwide. Nominated for an EMBO award (Excellence in the Life Sciences), the website was subsequently translated into five languages. Her work has gained several external grants from Teagasc – Ireland's Agriculture and Food Development Authority, the Irish Research Council and the Department of Agriculture, Food and the Marine.

== Selected publications ==
- Management of acutely injured cattle by on farm emergency slaughter: Survey of veterinarian views, 10 November 2022, Frontiers in Veterinary Science. McDermott Paul, McKevitt Aideen, Santos Flávia H., Hanlon Alison.
- Exploring the understanding of best practice approaches to common dog behaviour problems by veterinary professionals in Ireland, 21 Mar 2019, Irish Veterinary Journal
- Multi-stakeholder focus groups on potential for meat inspection data to inform management of pig health and welfare on farm, 1 Feb 2019, Agriculture (Switzerland)
- What can carcass-based assessments tell us about the lifetime welfare status of pigs?, 1 Aug 2018, Livestock Science
- Challenges and Solutions to Supporting Farm Animal Welfare in Ireland: Responding to the Human Element, 21 Jun 2018, Devitt C, Hanlon A, More S, Kelly P, Blake M
- Towards the development of day one competences in veterinary behaviour medicine: Survey of veterinary professionals experience in companion animal practice in Ireland, 12 May 2018, Irish Veterinary Journal, Golden O, Hanlon AJ
- Prevalence of welfare outcomes in the weaner and finisher stages of the production cycle on 31 Irish pig farms, 27 Mar 2018, Irish Veterinary Journal, Van Staaveren N, Calderón Díaz JA, Garcia Manzanilla E, Hanlon A, Boyle LA.
- Identifying physiological measures of lifetime welfare status in pigs: Exploring the usefulness of haptoglobin, C- reactive protein and hair cortisol sampled at the time of slaughter, 2 Mar 2018, Irish Veterinary Journal, Carroll GA, Boyle LA, Hanlon A, Palmer MA, Collins L, Griffin K, Armstrong D, O'Connell NE
