= Hanlon Brothers =

Acrobatics act

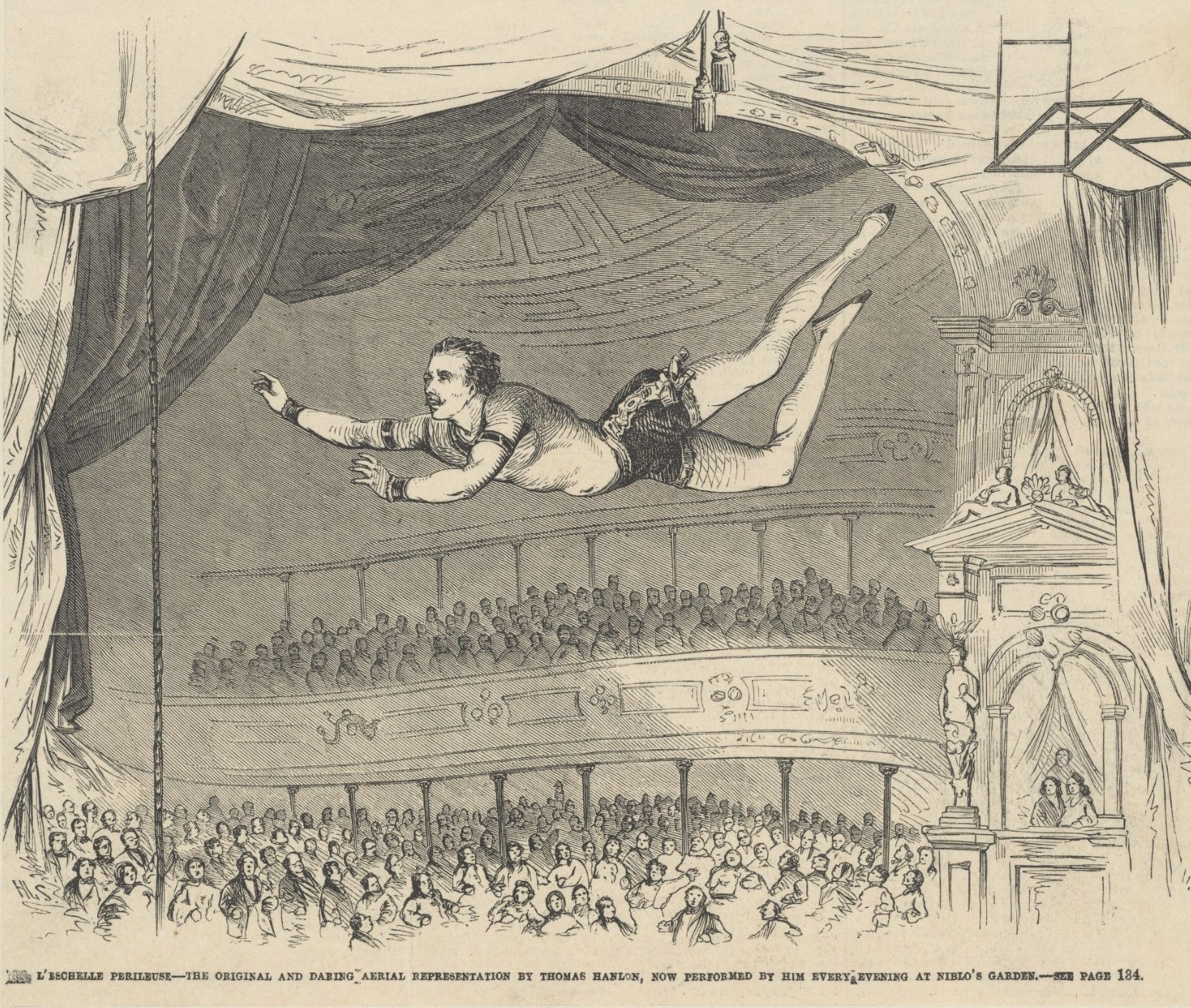
Thomas Hanlon performing, 1860

The Hanlon Brothers (also known as Hanlon-Lees) were a group of pre-Vaudevillian acrobats founded in the early 1840s. World-renowned practitioners of "entortillation" (an invented word based upon the French term entortillage, which translates to "twisting" or "coiling") – that is, tumbling, juggling, and an early form of "knockabout" comedy (later popularized by such groups as the Marx Brothers and the Three Stooges), the troupe consisted of the six Hanlon brothers and their mentor, established acrobat Professor John Lees.

Originally billed as "The Hanlons," the group debuted in 1846 at London's Theatre Royal, Adelphi. At this time, the company consisted of George, William, and Alfred Hanlon, who were essentially wards of John Lees until his death in 1855. After his demise, the Hanlons returned to England and enlisted their younger brothers – Thomas, Edward, and Frederick – and rechristened themselves "The Hanlon-Lees" in honor of their fallen friend and instructor.

The newly expanded troupe made its American debut in 1858 at Niblo's Garden in New York City, and spent the next four decades touring the United States and Europe. As their skills improved, their performances became more elaborate. When Jules Léotard introduced the trapeze in 1859, for instance, the Hanlon-Lees quickly adapted to the new device; their next production, Le Voyage en Suisse (A Trip to Switzerland) contained an aerial juggling sequence that stunned Émile Zola, who expressed utter astonishment at the vast number of airborne objects. There is a spectacular poster by Jules Chéret, the great pioneer of the classic era of French poster design, advertising their appearance at the Folies Bergère in 1878. In addition, the company is referred to in J.K. Huysmans chapter: "The Folies-Bergere in 1879" in his book Parisian Sketches, first published in France in 1880: "these side-splitting, yet funereal, clowns, the Hanlon-Lees.".

The Hanlon-Lees also patented several inventions, including the aerial safety net, a wooden brace used in the construction of scenery (which is to this day referred to as a "hanlon") and improvements to the Lallement velocipede in 1868 and 1869 patents.

Despite the death of Thomas in 1868, the group continued to perform regularly until the early 1900s, at which point George Hanlon's sons Will and Fred assumed control of the company's repertoire. They would carry the company successfully into the 20th Century, going so far as to appear on film for Thomas Edison in a production entitled Fantasma. The Hanlons would endure for another four decades, adapting their acts for vaudeville and finally appearing in the 1945 season of the Ringling Brothers and Barnum & Bailey Circus.

In 1979, six American performers sought out the final living descendant of the original Hanlon brothers and asked for her blessing upon their new company, dubbed the Hanlon-Lees Action Theater. This modern incarnation of the original troupe is best known for pioneering and refining a theatrical form of medieval jousting, an event which the company continues to perform at Renaissance festivals in the United States. The modern day Hanlon-Lees also perform Western-themed shows such as fantasy rodeos and cowboy exhibitions.
