= Peter Hanan =

New Zealand swimmer

Peter Hanan MNZM
Personal information
- Full name: Peter Sedgley Hanan
- Born: 30 November 1915 Morrinsville, New Zealand
- Died: 15 September 2008 (aged 92)
- Spouses: Esma Elaine St George (m. 1946; died 1970) Muriel Peggy Paterson (m. 1971)
- Relative(s): Patrick Hanan (brother); Albert Dewes (grandfather)

Sport
- Country: New Zealand
- Sport: Swimming

Achievements and titles
- National finals: 100 yards freestyle champion (1938, 1940); 220 yards freestyle champion (1938, 1939, 1940)

Peter Sedgley Hanan MNZM (30 November 1915 – 15 September 2008) was a New Zealand swimmer who represented his country at the 1938 and 1950 British Empire Games.

== Early life and family ==
Born in Morrinsville on 30 November 1915, Hanan was the son of Frederick Arthur Hanan, a dentist and later a dairy farmer, and Ida Helen Hanan (née Dewes). His younger brother was Patrick Hanan, and his maternal grandfather was Albert Dewes.

Hanan was educated at Mount Albert Grammar School in Auckland, and trained as an accountant. He married Esma Elaine St George in 1946, and the couple went on to have two children.

== Swimming ==
Hanan began swimming at the public swimming baths in Morrinsville, which opened in 1924, as a child, and later receiving coaching from Malcolm Champion at the Tepid Baths in Auckland. He went on to win five New Zealand national swimming titles: the 100 yards freestyle in 1938 and 1940; and the 220 yards freestyle in three consecutive years from 1938.

Hanan represented New Zealand in the men's 110 yards freestyle at both the 1938 British Empire Games in Sydney and the 1950 British Empire Games in Auckland. On both occasions he did not progress beyond the heats.

== Military service ==
Enlisting in the Royal New Zealand Air Force in 1939, Hanan became a Spitfire and Hurricane pilot during World War II. He was commissioned as a pilot officer in July 1941, promoted to flying officer in July 1942, and flight lieutenant in July 1943. He saw active service with Fighter Command in Britain and in the Far East, including with No. 67 Squadron RAF in Burma, and was transferred from the active list to the Reserve of Air Force Officers at the end of January 1945.

== Later life and death ==
Following World War II, Hanan purchased his family's dairy farm, and also finished his accountancy studies. His first wife died in 1970, and after marrying nurse Peg Paterson, Hanan returned to live and practise accountancy in Morrinsville. His daughter from his first marriage had Down syndrome, and in 1963 Hanan was the founding president of the Thames sub-branch of the IHC. He was elected as a Morrinsville borough councillor, serving in that role for six years, and was the treasurer of the Morrinsville RSA from 1964. In 2005 he published a history of the organisation titled Lest we forget: the history of Morrinsville's RSA from 1916 to 2004.

In the 2002 Queen's Birthday and Golden Jubilee Honours, Hanan was appointed a Member of the New Zealand Order of Merit, for services to the community. When celebrations were held in 2008 to mark the centenary of the first meeting of the Morrinsville Town Board, Hanan, then aged 92, was recognised as the oldest person born in the town still resident there.

Hanan died on 15 September 2008, and he was buried at the Piako Lawn Cemetery, Morrinsville.
