= Coolkenno =

Village in County Wicklow, Ireland

Coolkenno Cuil Ui Caoinaith
- Village
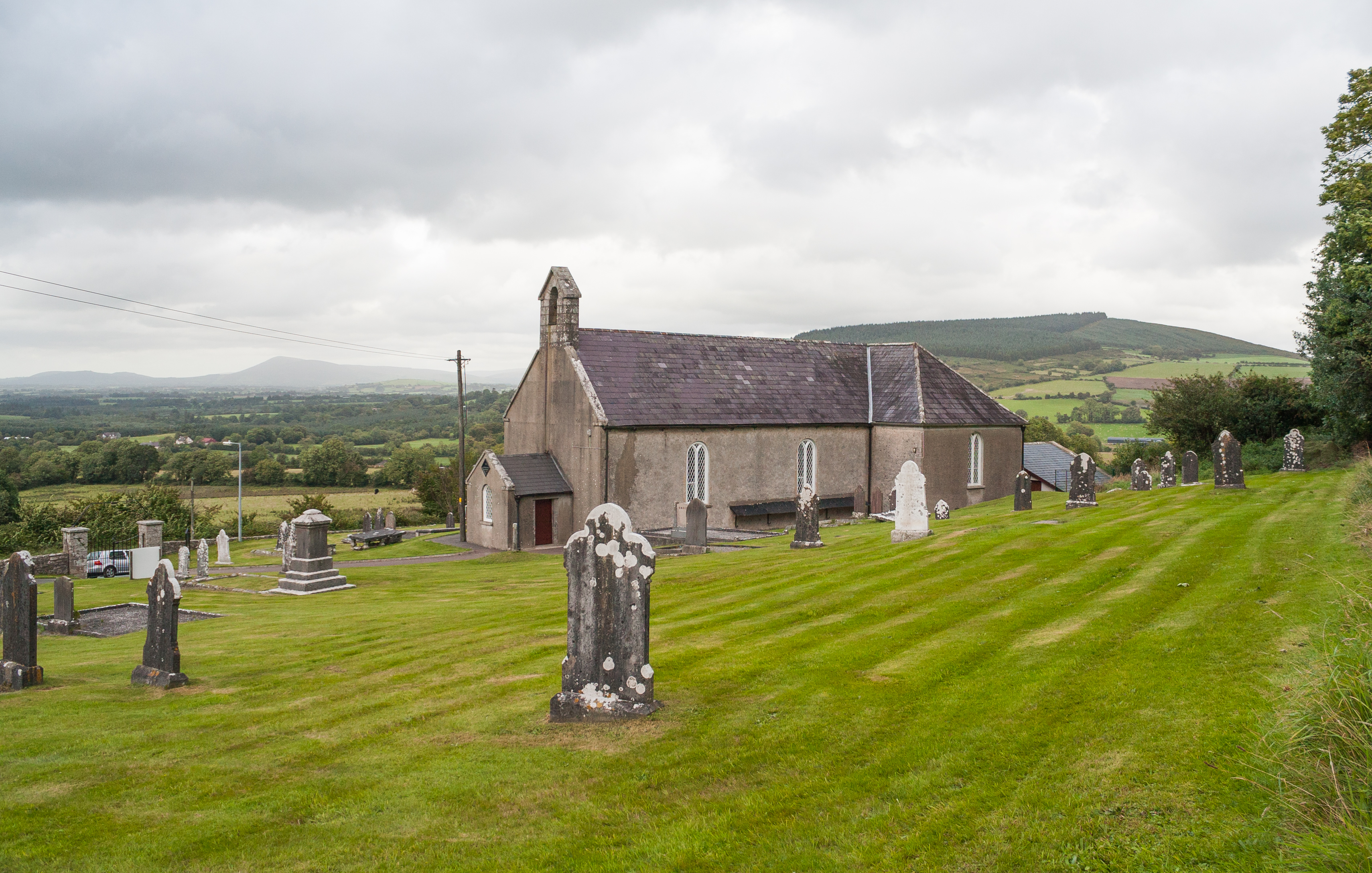
- St. Michael's Church

- Location in Ireland
- Coordinates: 52°46′55″N 6°35′46″W
- Country: Ireland
- Province: Leinster
- County: County Wicklow; County Carlow
- Elevation: 157 m (515 ft)

Population (2006)
  - Total: 562
- population of Shillelagh rural area region
- Irish Grid Reference: S946712

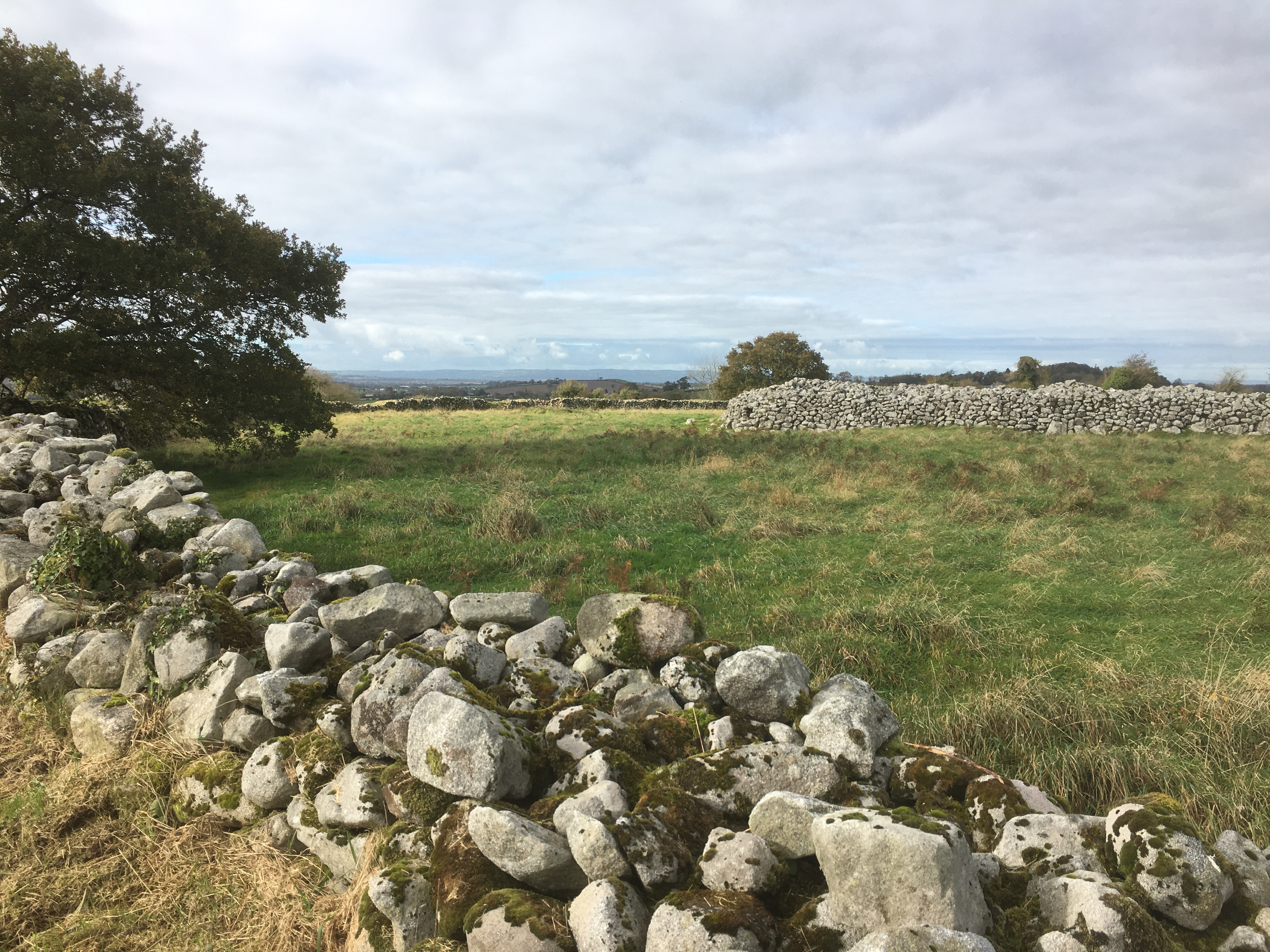
Outer walls of Rathgall hillfort, Coolkenno, County Wicklow

Coolkenno (Irish: Cúil Uí Chionaoith meaning The nook of the Uí Chionaoith tribe) is a village in County Wicklow in Ireland. It is located about halfway between Tullow in County Carlow and Shillelagh in County Wicklow. It is also a townland in the civil parish of Aghowle.

The village is served by Ballyconnell National School (2.5 km) and Tullow Community School (8 km). Local monuments include the ruined Clonmore Castle, Rath Gall hilltop ring fort, Labbanasighe megalithic tomb in Moylisha and Saint Finian's monastery at Aghowle. Mount Wolsley Hilton golf course is 8 km away at Tullow and Rathwood Home and Garden Centre is 3 km away.

== Sport ==
=== Coolkenno GAA ===
The hurling club "Killinure Emmets" were the earliest starters of hurling around the Shillelagh district. Coolkenno are believed to have represented the area as well as Ballyraheen and Derry Rovers. From the beginning of the century "Shillelagh" dominated as the name of the district team.

In 1890 Crecrin Harps played Graiguecullen in the County Carlow final. In 1897, Killinure arrived and beat Shillelagh in their first match. The team was also present in 1913 as well but the club disappeared again in late 1914. After the 1921 War of Independence treaty, the team restarted and in 1924 it was beaten by Rathdangan in the County Junior Football Final. The club eventually fizzled out due to a decrease of young players and emigration from Killinure and Coolkenno.

The present club in Coolkenno was founded in November 1980, after a meeting in the Crablane pub by local Gaelic football enthusiasts. It took a seventeen years for major success when the club won its first county title, the Junior B Football Championship, in Baltinglass in December 1997. Coolkenno later won the county intermediate title in 2002, beating St. Pats of Wicklow Town in the county final at Aughrim.

A new football pitch was completed in 2003–2004 and holds a clubhouse and gym. In 2010, Coolkenno joined ranks with Shillelagh G.F.C to re-create the 1946 St. Mary's team. The team won the Wicklow Senior Championship in its first season in late 2011. Coolkenno also has produced players for the Wicklow Senior Team under Mick O'Dwyer such as Don Jackman of Knockeen, Paddy Dalton of Rath, Eamon Rossiter of Coolkenno and Steven Cushe of Rath East.

Bernard Jackman of Coolkenno, the former Ireland rugby and Leinster Heineken Cup winner, had also played for Coolkenno G.F.C in his youth.

== Notable people ==
- Christabel Bielenberg, author, lived in Coolkenno with husband Peter, from 1948 until their deaths in the early 2000s. Christabel was the author of two volumes of memoir, The Past Is Myself and The Road Ahead about their journey of fleeing Nazi Germany and subsequently settling on their farm at Munny House, Coolkenno. Peter Bielenberg was a friend of Adam von Trott zu Solz, who was involved in the Stauffenberg bomb plot against Hitler in 1944. Today Munny House is home to the Munny Trail, a walking and equestrian trail in Coolkenno.
- Rev. Fr. John .J. Cavanaugh, president of Notre Dame University in the 1950s. Though born in Michigan, U.S., all of Cavanaugh's grandparents had come from Killinure, Coolkenno and Kilquiggan and had left the vicinity during The Great Famine.
- Abraham Groves, the first surgeon to perform the removal of the appendix in 1883 on the American Continent, had been the son of Aghowle and Coolkenno people who emigrated in the 1820s to Ontario, Canada.
