= James Hanlon (medical doctor) =

Deafblind Irish physician

- Born: 1908
- Died: June 1961 (aged 52–53); Lourdes
- Occupation: Surgeon, physiotherapist

James Hanlon (1908 – June 1961) was an Irish medical doctor. After an infection left him blind and deaf at age 42, forcing his retirement from surgery, he retrained to become a physiotherapist. Hanlon was likely the first deafblind person to study and practice physiotherapy. He later worked at the Dublin Central Remedial Clinic, treating patients and raising money for funding a new clinic for polio patients.

== Education and early career ==
James Hanlon was born in 1908. He attended Clongowes Wood College County Kildare and Blackrock College in Dublin. He excelled at sport, particularly rugby and diving, as well as golf. Hanlon won the John Lumsden Memorial Cup at the Royal Dublin Golf Club in 1939. He studied medicine at the Royal College of Surgeons in London. He continued his studies in a number of postgraduate positions, including in Vienna, where he learned the latest tonsillectomy techniques which he would pioneer in Ireland.

Hanlon worked as an ear, nose, and throat (ENT) consultant surgeon and assistant to Dr. Stafford Johnson in Dublin in the 1940s. He practiced medicine at the Royal Victoria Eye and Ear Hospital and at St Laurence's Hospital, as well as a private hospital he established with two colleagues on Leeson Street.

== Life and work as a deafblind doctor ==
When Hanlon was 42, he developed an ocular infection when a patient coughed sputum into his left eye during an examination. An operation to remove the infection was unsuccessful, and through sympathetic ophthalmia spread to both eyes; he was blind within months. Doctors attempted to treat the infection with the new antibiotic streptomycin, but the high dosage they used resulted in deafness.

After becoming deafblind, he became depressed. At the time of the accident, he and his wife Betty had four children, the youngest was eight months old. Betty took on the family's finances and running the household. A trip to the shrine in Lourdes helped Hanlon find a new sense of optimism and he reset his goals, deciding to work towards becoming a physical therapist. Hanlon applied to Trinity College, but was rejected because they felt he could not do the coursework. He wrote to the newly crowned Queen Elizabeth for permission to study in London. A secretary attended lectures with Hanlon, translating through tactile sign language and taking notes to be converted to braille. Because of his medical expertise, after six months of study he was awarded an honorary degree. Hanlon may have been the first deafblind person to train and practice as a physiotherapist.

Upon returning to Dublin he began to work with physiotherapist Kathleen O'Rourke, who ran a remedial clinic for polio victims in her apartment. She would eventually establish Central Remedial Clinic in Dublin. Hanlon was able to diagnose the condition through careful attention to early signs of the disease, such as the vibration of a slightly dragging foot. In 1954 he toured the United States, leading a campaign to fundraise for the clinic. During this trip he appeared on The Ed Sullivan Show and met Helen Keller.

Hanlon eventually returned to work for St Laurence's Hospital as a consultant physiotherapist. He also provided private consultation out of office rooms on Fitzwilliam Square. Either his wife or his secretary Josephine Kearney would translate patients' reports through tactile signing; he became so adept that he could answer questions in real time.

Hanlon became a minor celebrity in Dublin after his story was featured on a BBC program called Silver Lining. He also learned to enjoy sports again, hitting golf balls and astounding onlookers by diving in tandem with Olympic diver Eddie Heron, who would tap Hanlon just before they would hit the water.

== Death and legacy ==
Hanlon had several heart attacks in early 1961. He had started to visit Lourdes every summer since losing his sight; in June 1961, he died in the Asile hospital on the grounds of the shrine. He received tributes from around the world at his death; Pope John XXIII ordered that news of his death be announced on Vatican radio, and a French television report described him as a man of great courage and as a "hero for all." His Irish Times obituary said Hanlon "overcame blindness and impaired hearing to lead a brilliant medical career."

Shane Byrne, a rugby union player, is Hanlon's grandson. James Hanlon son was inspired by his father and followed in his footsteps and became a doctor as did several of James Hanlon's grandchildren. The Little Museum of Dublin owns several possessions of Hanlon, including a tape measurer which his secretary adapted to provide raised bumps denoting measurement markings.
