= Point Hannon =

Coordinates: 47°53′13″N 122°36′37″W

Point Hannon, also known as Whiskey Spit, is a 7.7-acre (31,000 m^{2}) sand spit with 1,775 feet (541 m) of no-bank shoreline, jutting out from the eastern edge of Hood Head, in the Hood Canal of the state of Washington. For surface navigation, Point Hannon is marked by a light. The low sandy spit with shoal water extends about 600 feet (180 m) east of the light. The open waters to the North of the spit, are among the deepest in Puget Sound. Local magnetic disturbances of more than 2° from normal variation have been observed in Hood Canal at Point Hannon.

Whiskey Spit has been a meeting point for native peoples, mariners, fishers, and loggers for hundreds of years. Port Gamble S'Klallam, Jamestown S'Klallam and Lower Elwha Klallam members tell of Tribal Gatherings, ceremonies, and ancestral canoe burials, as well as regular trapping, hunting, and fishing endeavors going back far beyond the first documented visits made by European explorers to Point Hannon in the 1790s, and continuing to the present day. Shanghaied crew aboard inbound clippers, loggers, and other freighters were waylaid at Whiskey Spit so that they would not escape, and they were replaced by Native crews for the remainder of the sail into Puget Sound and back. At peaks in logging and wartime military activity, Whiskey Spit has functioned as billet, brothel, speakeasy, and casino. Artifacts and relics should not be removed from the site.

Whiskey Spit offers panoramic views of the Cascade Mountains, stretching from Mount Baker to Mount Rainier. With its sand dollar colony, moon snails, food sources for threatened salmon, and sea lion, harbor seal, gray whale, orca whale, harbor porpoise, bottlenose dolphin, muskrat, and river otter visitors, the spit is one of Washington's most special protected shorelines. The delicate freshwater marsh on the point provides the unique habitat requirements for the unusually wide range of nesting shore birds, migrating waterfowl, reptiles and amphibians, prey for the osprey, eagle, heron, and raven populations, and the essential foods for the plentiful sand lance and surf smelt.

In May 2002, The Trust for Public Land conveyed the property to the Washington State Park System for permanent protection. A water access primitive campground was planned for state park land on Point Hannon, but the Friends of Point Hannon, North Olympic Salmon Coalition, Coastal Observation and Seabird Survey Team, Admiralty Audubon, Washington State Audubon Society, supporters of the Olympic Coast National Marine Sanctuary, and Northwest Water Resources oppose the conditional use permit and oppose exemption under the Jefferson County Shoreline Master Program.

== See also ==
- Hood Canal
