= Mary Josephine Hannan =

Irish physician

Mary Hannan
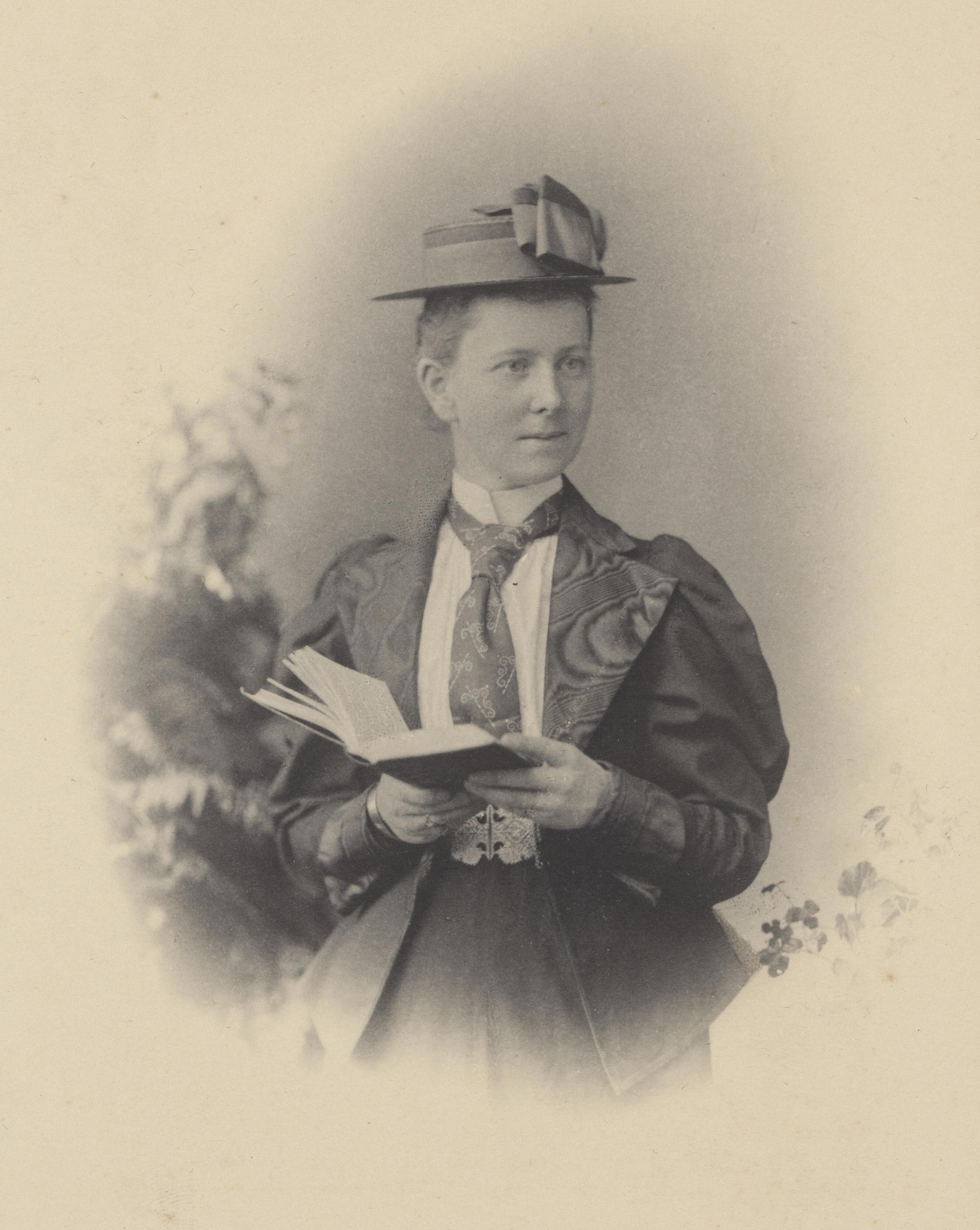
- Born: Mary Josephine Hannan c 1865; Dublin, Ireland
- Died: c 1935

Mary Josephine Hannan LRCPI & SI &LM (c1865–c1935) was the first Irishwoman to graduate LRCPI & SI and LM.

== Career ==
Almost nothing is known about Hannan's early life or who her parents were. Hannan was one of the first women to study in the Royal College of Surgeons in Ireland. She graduated in 1890 while living in Riverstown, Killucan, County Westmeath. By 1892 she had moved to India and was working in the Victoria Hospital, Kotah State and then the Dufferin Hospital, Ulwar State. In 1894 she became Chief medical officer in the Lady Dufferin Hospital in Shikarpar, Upper Sind. At this time she was appointed the honorary medical adviser to The Salvation Army.

Hannan returned to the United Kingdom, first living in Cardiff, Wales, from about 1896 to 1899. She was once more in Dublin in 1900 and lived and worked in Lower Mount St. for about 5 years. On the census for 1901 she has a young patient staying with her and a governess and nurse from India as well as the domestic servants. In 1905 she moved again to South Africa. Initially she lived in Pietermaritzburg, before in 1910, settling for a few years in Pretoria. Hannan lectured in midwifery and served as medical officer at the Victoria Maternity Hospital from 1914 to 1921. She tended to native women including working with them on venereal diseases. She was also part of the medical section of the Union Defence Force from 1918.

Hannan published papers on public health through the 1920s before retiring in 1931. She lived for a period of the twenties, 1924–1927, in Johannesburg but the rest of the time was in Pretoria. Before she died she spent time in Hartbeespoort, Transvaal. Her exact date of death is unknown. She still appeared on the medical register until 1937 but is believed to have died in 1935.
