= Peter Hannan (footballer) =

Australian rules footballer

Personal information
- Full name: Peter Alphonsus Hannan
- Born: 18 October 1908; Seymour, Victoria
- Died: 4 May 1938 (aged 29); Kew, Victoria
- Original team: Yarraville

Playing career^{1}
Years	Club	Games (Goals)
1927	Melbourne	2 (0)
1929–32	Yarraville (VFA)	53 (1)
1933	Footscray	6 (0)
1933–34	Prahran (VFA)	3 (1)
- ^{1} Playing statistics correct to the end of 1933.

Peter Alphonsus Hannan (18 October 1908 – 4 May 1938) was an Australian rules footballer who played with Melbourne and Footscray in the Victorian Football League (VFL).

== Family ==
The son of William Michael Hannan, and Mary Hannan (-1944), née Breene, Peter Alphonsus Hannan was born at Seymour, Victoria on 18 October 1908.

== Death ==
He died at his parents' house in Kew at the age of 29 in May 1938.
