= Ó hAnluain =

Family name

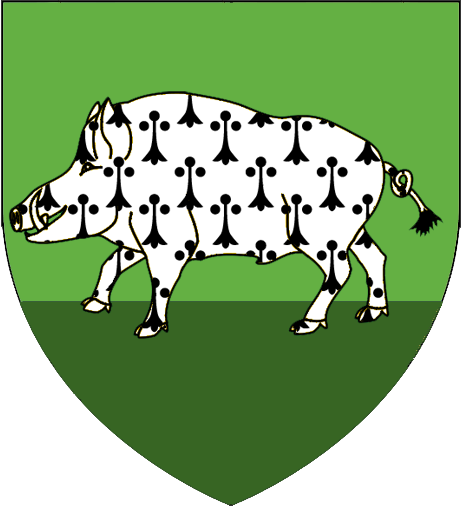
- The Ó Hanlon, Lord of Orior
- Parent house: Uí Nialláin (Síl Cernaich)
- Founded: 4th century
- Founder: Anluan
- Titles: kings of Uí Nialláin; roidama of Ireland (w/ others); lords of Airghialla; The O’Hanlon, lord of Orior; Rex et Duxes, Airthir; Lord of Nialláin; Baron of Orior (extinct); Chief, Uí Meith Tiri (to Kildare); Comtes de Killeavy; Ardmara, Loch nEathach et Snám Aignech; Royal Standard Bearer, north of the Boyne

The Ó hAnluain (anglicised as O'Hanlon) family was an agnatic extended family comprising one of a string of dynasts along the Ulster-Leinster border. Depending on the advantage to the clan, the Chief of the Name—The O'Hanlon—supported either the Earl of Tyrone or authorities within the English Pale. During the 15th century, ties were close with the famed Earls of Kildare. Frequently, members of the clan would fight on both sides during a rebellion. Some would be outlawed; others pardoned; some ending up on the winning side.

The heart of "O'Hanlon's Countrie" was centered on south central Ulster, much of it being in what is now the Republic of Ireland. The first O'Hanlon on record is Flaithbheartach Ua hAnluain, lord of Uí Nialláin, whose murder in the year 983 AD is recorded in the Annals of the Four Masters.

The anglicised version of the name is usually given as Hanlon or O'Hanlon, but there are many variants: Handlon, Handlan, Hanlan, Hanlen, Hanlin, Hallinan, Hanlyn etc. Occasionally some variants of the names Hanly, Hanley and Handly are also derived from Ó hAnluain, although Hanly is usually the anglicised form of Ó hAinle, an ancient Roscommon sept (the oldest on record is Donal O'Hanly, Bishop of Dublin from 1085 to 1096).

Capitalised as: Ó hANLUAIN or Ó ʜANLUAIN, the first 'h' should always be either lowercase, or a smaller 'H' font size.

== O'Hanlon's Country ==
The ancestors of the Ó hAnluain sept originated in the kingdom of Airgialla. By the 5th century A.D. the sept held territory in and around the modern barony of Oneilland, County Armagh, Northern Ireland, on the southwest shore of Lough Neagh. As the O'Neills rose in prominence from Dungannon to the west, the O'Hanlons moved to territory west of Armagh City. For half a millennium, they served as kings of Orior. The chieftain's name was synonymous with the territory which was better known as "O'Hanlon's Country". It comprised about one-third of modern County Armagh, predominantly the eastern third, and also included a large tract of County Louth, from Faughart to Ravensdale, and then over the Cooley mountains to Omeath near Carlingford. The peak of land acquisition was in 1504; in 1505 the territory beyond the Gap of the North was granted to the Earl of Kildare. Two of the earliest maps of Ulster, Jobson's Ulster maps (c. 1590) and Norden's map of Ireland (1610), both show O'Hanlon's Country. In 1586, when Sir John Perrot created the County of Armagh, O'Hanlon's country accounted for one of the five baronies: Armaghe, Toaghriny, Orier, Fuighes (Fews) and Onylane (O'Neilland). In later times "Orier" became the Baronies of Orior Upper and Orior Lower, the southernmost two of Armagh's eight Baronies. It is often overlooked that the Gaelic territory of Orior predates and extended beyond the Barony of that name in County Armagh. O'Hanlon's Country extended southwards into northern County Louth and to the East it encroached slightly into County Down. Before the county lines were finalised, some old maps show the old O'Hanlon seat of Loughgilly in County Down.

According to historian C. Thomas Cairney, the O'Hanlons were a chiefly family of the Oirghialla or Airgíalla tribe who were in turn from the Laigin tribe who were the third wave of Celts to settle in Ireland during the first century BC.

== O'Hanlon strongholds ==
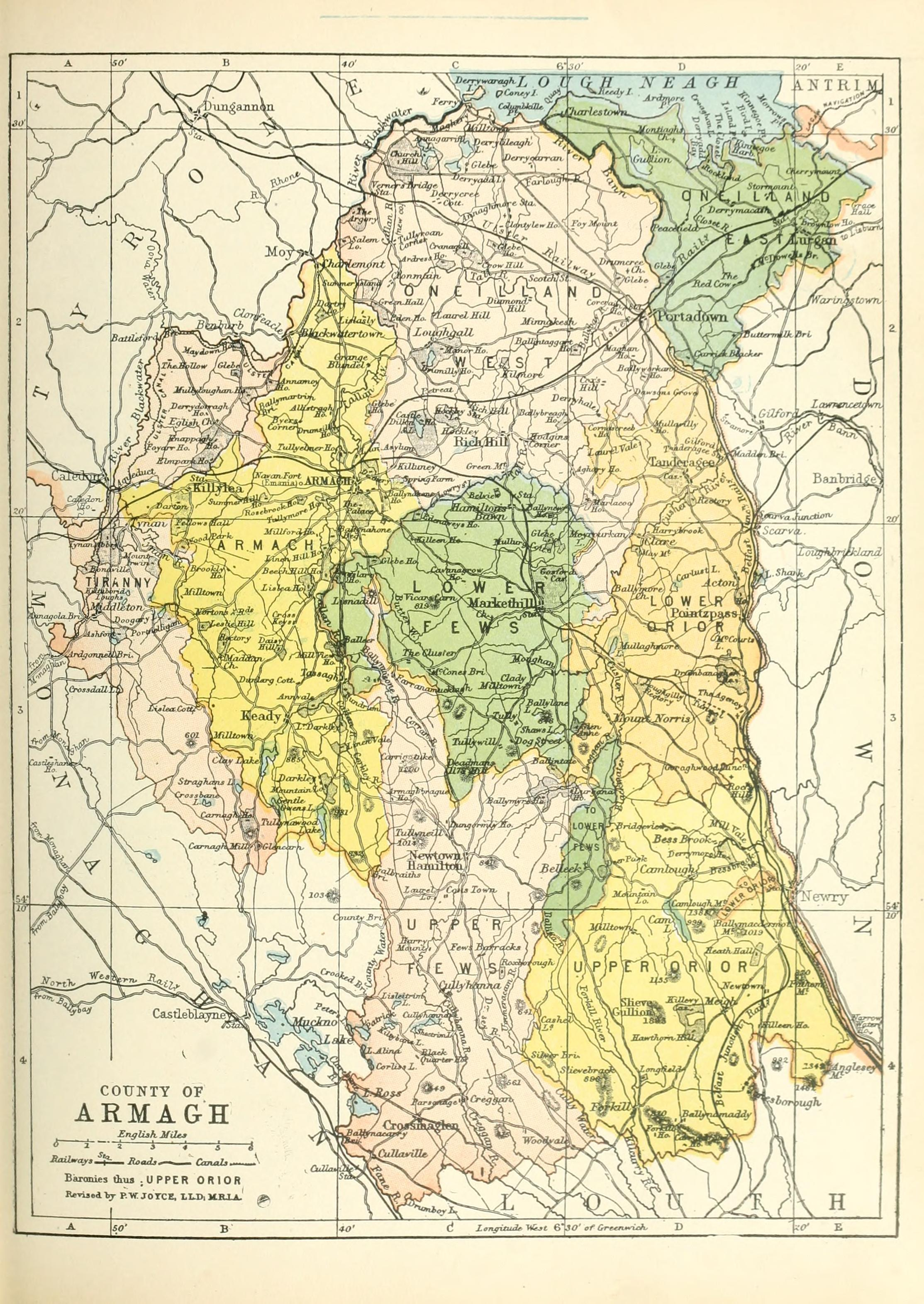
Orior, Upper and Lower, at left.

Anciently, the O'Hanlons – when sitting as kings of Aithir – kept their residence, and the sept's assembly, at Loughgall (Loch gCál), north of Armagh city. Even after the sept moved east toward Loughgilly, Loughgall was retained as a summer residence. When Edmond Mortimer arrived in Ireland in 1380 as Lord Justice, the chief O'Hanlon was recorded as amongst the righdamhna (those eligible to become a tanist, or heir-apparent, of an Irish kingdom) that were required to pay their court to him. The rock of Tanderagee rose to support the family's castle. Having secured the northern lowlands of County Armagh and the highlands approaching and surrounding the Ring of Gullion, the O'Hanlons located the chieftain's gateway strongholds on the approaches from Armagh and eastern Ulster in the north, and Dublin and the English Pale in the south." The northern roads converged on the modern-day village of Tandragee; the approaches from Dublin and the English Pale had to force the Gap of the North, and the chieftain's stronghold adjacent to Forkill at Mullagh. The third stronghold, Mullaghglass, guarded the road north from the English frontier town of Newry. Closer to the center of the O'Hanlon lands than Tanderagee and Forkill, Mullaghglass is also the easternmost edge of a tract of land stretching from the Newry vale to the Fews, passing Camlough lake and the northern slope of Sliab Gullion, to which the sept retreated after the fall of the Gaelic order.

Despite surrender and regrant under her father, Queen Elizabeth I confiscated O’Hanlon territory in 1571, granting all of Orior to a Captain Thomas Chatterton. He was unable to found a settlement as required, and had his grant revoked, with Sir Eochaidh "Oghy" O’Hanlon of Tanderagee able to reassert control over south Armagh.

After the Plantation of Ulster, Oliver St John (the Lord Deputy of Ireland) took over and rebuilt O'Hanlon Castle. During the Ulster Rebellion of 1641 the clan attempted to take back their former lands, however failed with the castle burnt down. Having passed out of the family it became known as Tandragee Castle and remained a ruin for 200 years, until it was completely rebuilt by the Comtes de Salis, and later the Dukes of Manchester.

== Various branches of the O'Hanlon sept ==
After the Battle of the Boyne, those holding the O'Hanlon and Hanlon names diverged socially, some assimilating into colonial Irish society and others staying rooted to their Gaelic past. The years 1590 to 1690 mark a century dividing past and present. Prior to those years, there was only one "Gaelic" sept. After those years, each branch of the family chose—or was forced to choose—to remain tied to their aboriginal identity or to be identified with the Irish colonial elite. The O'Hanlons had always been marchland brokers between the English Pale and the Gaelic north. Now they were forced to divide themselves along those lines. Two members of the sept best personify these widening challenges: Sir Eochaidh "Oghy" O'Hanlon and the Tory outlaw, Count Aodh Ruadh ("Redmond") O'Hanlon.

=== Sir Eochaidh "Oghy" Ó Hanlon ===
Sir Eochaidh was the last Royal Standard Bearer "north of the Boyne". A Colonel Felix O’Hanlon of London petitioned to perform the same at the coronation of George IV in 1821.

The origins of the colonial O’Hanlons lay in two sons of Sean, The O’Hanlon (c. 1510–1575). In addition to Sir Eochaidh O’Hanlon, last of the Name, there was also his brother, Feidliminh, and his four sons. All supported the Tudor monarchy, more or less, during the Nine Years' War and were granted lands in south Armagh for their loyalty to the Crown.

Eochaidh "Oghy" O'Hanlon, son of Shane Oge O'Hanlon, maintained his seat at Tandragee, near modern Poyntzpass, County Armagh. Oghy was lord of the baronies of Orior Lower and Orior Upper, and by Irish tradition (Brehon law) Chief of his name. In 1595, he married the sister of the Earl of Tyrone. This made his son and heir, Eochaidh Óg O'Hanlon, great-grandson to the Earl of Kildare. Young Oghy was also a great-grandson of Conn O'Neill, Prince of Ulster, and all the ties to the Gaelic aristocracy that entailed. When he was exiled to service under the King of Sweden, he took the blood of Irish and English kings with him.

Queen Elizabeth operated a policy of surrender and regrant to Irish nobles, where the Gaelic chiefs surrendered their lands, but were re-granted them with an English title after swearing allegiance to the Crown and promising to abide by English laws and customs. Amongst those who did was Hugh O'Neill in 1587 who was given the English title Earl of Tyrone. Eochaidh followed his example and had his lands re-granted by letters of the patent in the same year. He became a Knight under English law, "Sir" Eochaidh Oghy O'Hanlon, hereditary royal standard-bearer north of the River Boyne. Though an English peer, Eochaidh never made the cultural transition. He kept his Gaelic ways. As John O'Donovan edited into O'Daly's Tribes of Ireland,

The head of this family in our author's time was Sir Eochy O'Hanlon of Tandragee, who, though knighted, was considered so Irish, that the poet Spenser, in speaking of some great houses of the English in Ireland, who had so degenerated from their ancient dignities, "and are now growne as Irish, as O'Hanlon's breech, as the proverb there is."".

Spenser was referring to the Gaelic proverb, applied when someone was heavily native in their appearance and actions. Such people were "as Irish as O'Hanlon's breech." Spenser was not denigrating The O'Hanlon, as much as he was noting that erstwhile English families such as the Fitzsimons of counties Cavan and Down, had 'gone native' over the years.

=== Redmond O'Hanlon ===
Born around 1640 in Poyntzpass, O'Hanlon's Country, Count Redmond O'Hanlon was the son of Loughlin O'Hanlon. As a young man he worked as a footboy to Sir George Acheson of Markethill, but became fiercely anti-English. He spent several years in exile with the French army and tried to organise a French invasion of Ireland to depose the British. He was popular in France where he was reportedly awarded the courtesy title of Count O'Hanlon (the English title was extinguished in the family with the death of Sir Eochaidh O'Hanlon; the family lost Tandragee castle during the Plantation of Ulster in 1609). When the French negotiations failed, Redmond returned to Armagh in 1671 and became a notorious highwayman or rapparee. A real-life Robin Hood, Redmond robbed the English settlers, extorted protection money from the Scots, and was adored by the largely Catholic peasantry. A letter from the era states that his criminal activities were bringing in more money than the King's revenue collectors, and therefore the outlaw Count was easily able to bribe military officers and public officials. In 1674 the government of King Charles II put a price on his head with posters advertising for his capture, dead or alive. He was eventually murdered in his sleep by his foster brother and close associate Art MacCall O'Hanlon at Eight Mile Bridge near Hilltown on 25 April 1681. Art received a full pardon and two hundred pounds for murdering his leader. As had become the custom in English-ruled Ireland, there were gruesome displays of his body parts including his head which was placed on a spike over Downpatrick jail. His remains are said to lie in a family plot in the Church of Ireland cemetery in Letterkenny, County Donegal.

=== Aboriginal ===
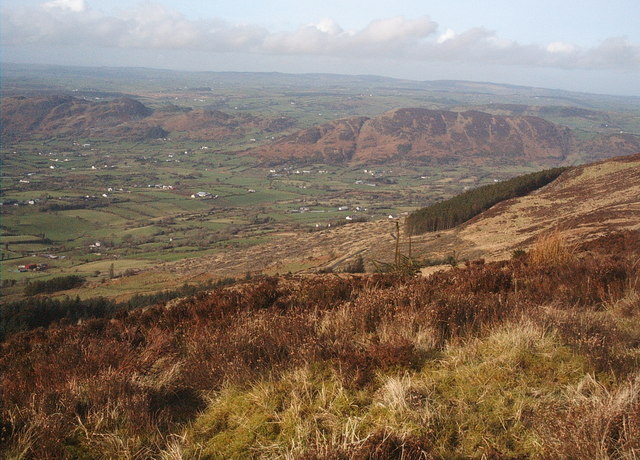
Sliab Gullion's western slope, looking out into the Fews with Duburren below.

Following the Plantation of Ulster, Ó Hanlon control over land in County Armagh dwindled. At the outbreak of the English Civil War in 1641, two members of the sept still held land under English law. Aodh Buide O'Hanlon held the largest tract, 2,045 acres stretching from the northern slope of Sliab Gullion northwest toward Belleeks at the edge of the Fews. And Padraig MacRory Ó Hanlon held another 133 acres. The acreage held by Aodh Buide and Padraig Ó hAnluain lay at the center of those lands associated with the family over the next two centuries.

=== Passing as ascendancy ===
Following the Act for the Settlement of Ireland (1652) and the Penal Laws following the defeat of James II, the descendants of Sir Eochaidh and his people of the Ó Hanlon nation could only hold land, or even leases, if they conformed to the rites of the Church of Ireland. Adherents to the Roman rite could not practice law, could not bear arms, and could not serve in public office. Following the Battle of the Boyne, Tandragee became the heart of the Order of the Orange. The Ó Hanlons remaining in County Armagh retreated to Armagh City or their former heartland in the south, in and around the parish of Killevy.

The O'Hanlons of Newry. Among those who conformed to the Church of Ireland's rites were the Ó Hanlons of Newry, direct descendants of Padraig Mór Ó hAnluain, a son of Eochaidh Óg Ó hAnluain, the last lord of Orior and heir to Sir Eochaidh. Padraig's son, Edmond, served under James II. His son, Felix, remained in Killevy parish as the Jacobite officers followed the King into exile, as did Felix's son, Edmond. By the second half of the 18th century, this branch relocated to the town of Newry. Hugh of Newry's (1721–1807) sons conformed, and one, Padraig, was admitted to the Irish bar. He served first as a Magistrate for Cos. Tyrone and Armagh. In 1808, Orangemen circulated information in Dublin Castle against his loyalty. He was cleared on inquest by the Duke of Richmond.

Following his move to Mill Street in the 18th century, Hugh O’Hanlon headed the most notable Roman Catholic family in Newry. Hugh was a direct descendant of Sir Eochaidh, and through him the lords of Orior. The family moved down east from south Armagh's hill communities to the west. Hugh's father was Hugh Ruadh O’Hanlon of Killeavy and his uncle was the "Bard of Armagh", Patrick Donnelly, Bishop of Dromore (1679–1716). This branch of the family took part in the Volunteer Movement. Hugh of Newry served on Dublin's Catholic Committee. He is also thought to have founded, in part, the Bank of Newry, dying in 1808. The O’Hanlon vault in Newry's Saint Mary's Cemetery bears the O’Hanlon coat-of-arms.

Hugh Padraig O’Hanlon, Jr., eldest son of Hugh of Newry, was admitted to the bar after the ban against Roman Catholics was lifted, and was known locally as "Counselor O’Hanlon". The Counselor was a member of the Volunteer Movement, but was radicalized and moved briefly out of the colonial circle of his father, becoming an Irish nationalist of United Ireland. Moving the Newry branch into the nationalist, republican camp, Hugh, Jr. was friend and acquaintance to Theobald Wolfe Tone, mentioned in the Tone's diaries. O’Hanlon became publican of the Crown Inn at 106–108 Hill Street, Newry, where the local chapter of the United Irishmen was formed and met. Though many United men were reprised against following the defeats at the Battle of Ballynahinch and the Battle of Vinegar Hill, Hugh and his brother escaped censure. In 1812, Hugh, Jr. supported the failed campaign of John Philpot Curran, Master of the Rolls, as Member of Parliament (Westminster) for Newry. At a dinner in Curran's honour, held at the Whitecross Hotel in Margaret Street, Hugh was lauded for efforts made on behalf of the Patriot-lawyer's election.

During Daniel O’Connell's agitation for Catholic Emancipation through repeal of the remaining laws, Hugh, Jr. campaign furiously for religious tolerance and equal protection of the laws. In 1826, however, he departed for colonial India. He became a leading barrister. In 1846, he raised funds in Calcutta for Famine relief. Hugh O’Hanlon III, Counselor O’Hanlon's eldest son, returned from colonial service in India to become a London barrister in the Irish Colonial Office at Westminster. There, Hugh III founded Ireland's system of local government through a pilot program for Newry in the form of a Westminster bill, for "Better Lighting, Watching, Cleansing and Paving". The legislative system proved so successful that it was applied nationally. Hugh III was then applied Law Advisor to Dublin Castle, a peak appointment in the colonial order. Other sons of Hugh, Jr. included Pringle, who served in the First Bengal Cavalry; another, Edward, died in colonial service at Rangoon, in the British East Indies.

The O'Hanlons of Dublin. Included among those who also passed into Irish colonial society was the Colonel Ó Hanlon of 1821, who petitioned to resume Sir Eochaidh O'Hanlon's honorary position as Royal Standard Bearor to the King (or Queen) "north of the river Boyne". During the visit of King George IV to Ireland in 1821, the Colonel was permitted to resume the position. George IV was the first English monarch to visit since Richard II.

The O'Hanlons of Louth. Eoghan H. Hanlon of Roodstown, County Louth Ireland emigrated to Boston, Massachusetts. He became a saddle maker and a principal of Hanlon & Bradstreet, saddler and harnessmakers. Eoghan was a member of the Ancient and Honorable Artillery Company of Massachusetts, as served in the company with H.R.H. Albert Edward, Prince of Wales.

== The O'Hanlon title ==
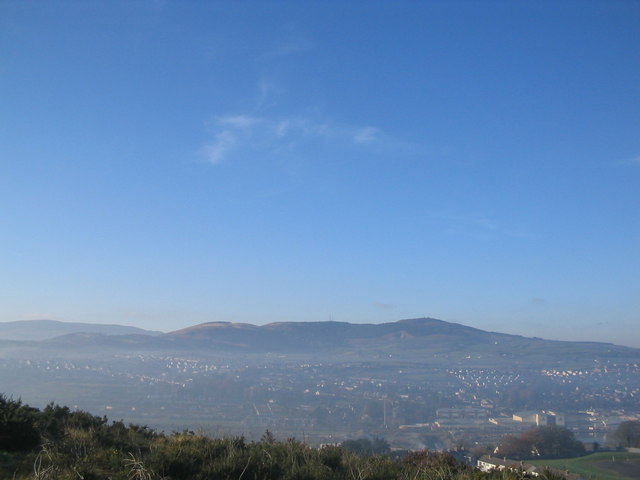
Camlough mountain, center of the Ó Hanlon sept's historical holdings in south Armagh.

The lands between the strongholds enclosed the "creaght" of the sept, the unit of land under Gaelic law used for the pasturing and seasonal droving of the nation's herds. Governing the creaghts and strongholds for the sept was the Chief of the Name, "The Ó Hanlon." Under Gaelic law, all male relations sharing the same great grandmother with the dying Chieftain were eligible for "acclaimation" as the next Chief of the Name at the sept's coronation stone, Cairn Magha at Clontygora, or "the Slaughter Stone".

The O'Hanlon ruled the eastern portion of the medieval kingdom of Oirghialla, capitaled at Clones in modern County Monaghan. To him fell the duty of protecting Oirghialla's eastern march against Ulstermen pushed to the seaboard in the 5th century, Common Era. The region stretched from Lough Neagh's shore adjacent to the Tyrone/Armagh border all the way to Carlingford Lough. It was called Croich na n'Airthear, i.e. regio Orientalium, later preserved in the names attached to the baronies of Orior.

The title "The O'Hanlon" was extinguished at English law, and the last Chief of the Name took the English title, "Baron of Orior". The Ó Hanlon title (Barony) is believed to have died with that first holder, Sir Oghy (Eocha) Ó Hanlon in 1600. At the time Sir Eochaidh's death, his heir, Eochaidh "Ochy" Og, was leading the Ó Hanlons fighting with the Earl of Tyrone the Nine Years' War (1596–1603) against the English Crown and its colonial elite in the Pale. As such, the title could not pass to the Baron's heir. Oghie Oge's omission from the plantation would appear to confirm this. As would the inclusion of Oghie Oge's two sons Felim and Brian as a single entry; if either of them had inherited a title, they would surely have been listed separately. Oghie Oge was still alive at the time of the Plantation. Ee only died in 1611, fighting for the King of Sweden against the Poles.

The Public Record Office of Northern Ireland has an early patent of 1609 (Document ref. D/1854) in which King James I grants to Patrick O'Hanlon in perpetuity various towns and lands near Mountnorris, County Armagh. It is unknown if this is one of the two Patrick Hanlons named above in the plantation, and/or if this might refer to the seven townlands granted to the descendants of Sir Oghy Ó Hanlon. Whatever their history, the lands did not remain in Ó Hanlon hands for long: the Mountnorris estate shortly afterwards became the property of Francis Annesley, 1st Viscount Valentia (an Englishman).

As for the title "The O'Hanlon", it existed at Gaelic law, not English, or even the Irish law developed after the declaration of the Republic. Presumably, a gathering of the O'Hanlons could still declare one of their own "The O'Hanlon", Gaelic An t-Anluain, in the same manner of other septs and clans.

== Heraldry ==
Though regarded as Irish sept arms now, the arms historically associated with the Gaelic O'Hanlon sept are thought to have been adopted by Sir Eochaidh O'Hanlon at the time of Surrender and Regrant under Henry Tudor. The arms may incorporate older sept icons, such as the boar, the lizard, and the earthen mound.

1: The O'Hanlon Blazon and Coat of Arms

According to Burke's General Armory of England, Scotland, Ireland and Wales, the O'Hanlon/Hanlon name has four blazons registered (pages 453 & 752). The four blazons are:

1. Argent on a mount vert, a boar passant proper, armed or.
2. Vert on a mount in base proper a boar passant ermine.
3. Gules, three crescents argent.
4. Gules, three plates argent.

The first two are for the descendants of the O'Hanlons of Armagh. These are those most often seen and are shown below. The third is used by the Hanlons of Kent, England, and the fourth by another Hanlon branch in England; these last two are very rarely seen.

Ó Hanlon Coat of Arms (1) The Boar is the symbol of Bravery and ermine signifies nobility or royalty. Ó Hanlon Coat of Arms (2) The boar was an ancient Celtic motif used well before medieval heraldry came into being to symbolise courage, aggression and savagery. This choice for the Ó Hanlons of Armagh would have been a none-too-subtle message implying Gaelic defiance and hinting at the Ó Hanlons' military strength and courage.

2: The Ó Hanlon crest

- "A lizard displayed vert" is the crest described in Burke's General Armory of England, Scotland, Ireland and Wales. This crest appears on the Hanlon tomb of 1708 in Letterkenny, County Donegal.
- A hand grasping a dagger appears on the Ó Hanlon tomb of 1759 in Newtown Cemetery, Lordship, County Louth.

3: The Ó Hanlon motto This varies from family to family, but the following are known to have been used:

- Sine Macula: translates to "without stain" or "untainted".
- Le dsais: translates to "By all means". (Source: website quoting Irish Family Mottoes by Tomas O'Baoill).
- Re Et Merito: translates to "By Reality and Merit". (Source: 1759 Ó Hanlon tomb in County Louth.)

4: The Ó Hanlon war cry

- "Ard Cullaigne Abaugh!” or "Defend the Wooded Heights," thought to refer to the Gap of the North. The Gap was a gateway to Ulster from the English Pale, and the duty to hold it for the Gaels was historically assigned to the men of Orior.

== History ==
=== Origins of the Ua h-Anluain Sept ===
==== Niall of the Nine Hostages, the Three Collas & The Milesian Genealogies ====
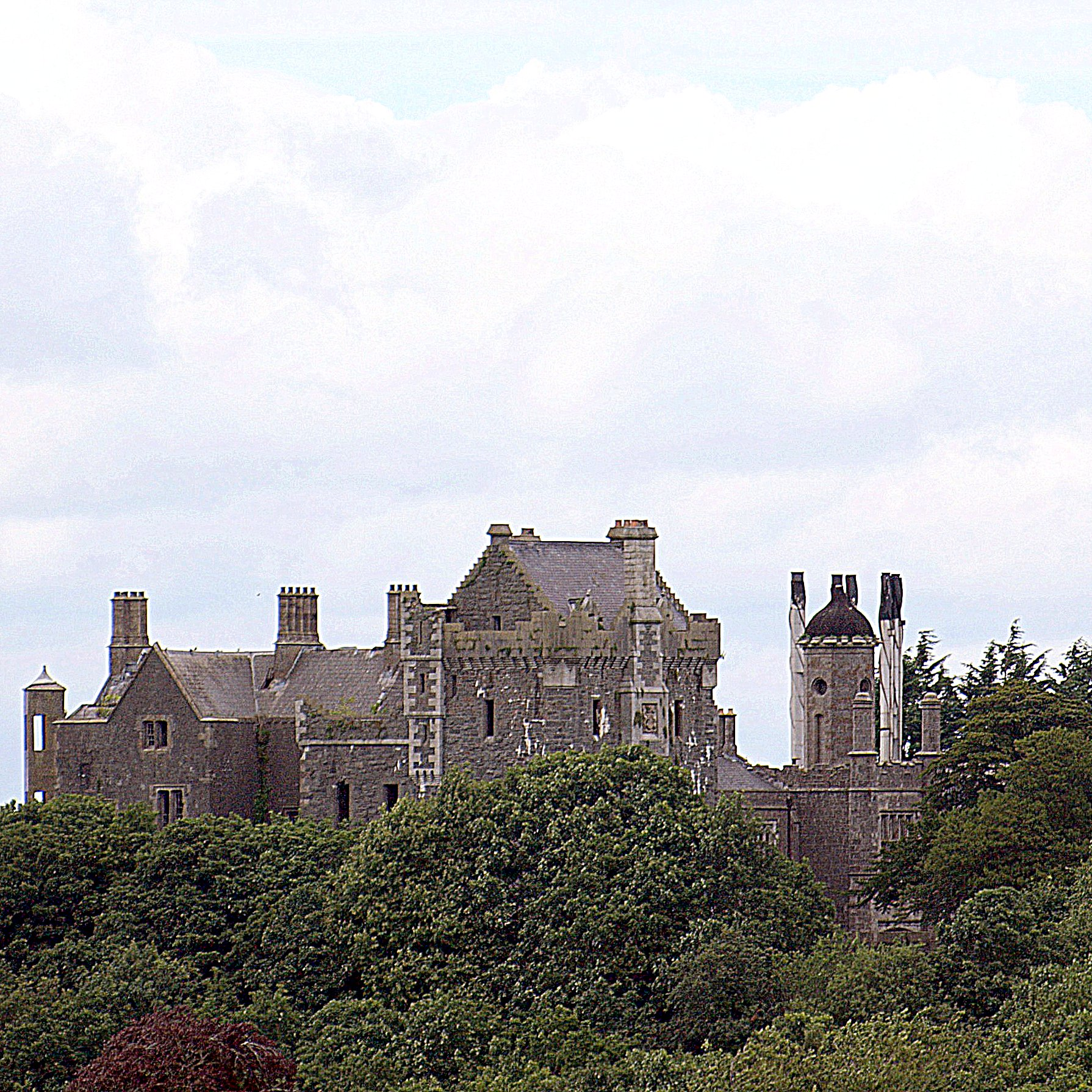
Tandragee Castle, built by the Comte de Salis and the Dukes of Manchester over the foundations of The Ó Hanlon's ancient stronghold overlooking the Cusher river through the Clare Glen.

The Ua hAnluain sept according to Irish tradition and legend descend from Eochaidh Dubhlen, who had three sons in the 4th century AD known as The Three Collas:

- Muireadach, or Colla da Chrioch (Colla Fo Críth) : "Colla of the two territories".
- Carioll, or Colla Uais : "Colla the Noble", 121st Monarch of Ireland.
- Meann, or, Colla Meann : "Colla the Famous".

Colla da Crioch appears in the Milesian genealogies as the 91st in his line and died in 357 AD. His descendant Anluain appears nine generations later as the 100th, probably born around the end of the 7th century AD The name Anluain comes from the Gaelic words 'an' = the (emphatic) and 'luain' = of the Moon, the brilliance of, the glittering of a flashing sword, thus 'great champion.' It appears that the 104th in this line, Anluain's great great grandson Flaitheartach Ua'h-Anluain (Laverty O'Hanlon), was the first to use the Ua'h-Anluain surname. (See Milesian genealogy below.) Clann Ua'h-Anluain (in English: Clan O'Hanlon) are therefore the descendants of Anluain.

332 C.E. The Ultonians of Ulster are defeated on the fields of Farney, by the three Collas, brothers who subsequently divided their conquered swordlands between them, which would become the over-kingdom of Airgialla.

470 C.E. Colla dna Crioch, had a descendant, Daire. son of Finnchad. Daire lived on a hill amidst the drumlins of north County Armagh, south of Lough Neagh on the approaches to the Blackwater river. Saint Patrick asked for the hill, a place to site his cathedral.

500 C.E. According to some accounts the O’Hanlons held the territory around Saint Patrick's future settlement at Armagh and was descended through Niallan. Daire, common ancestor to the septs O’Hanlon, MacMahon, Maguire and McCann offered Saint Patrick a church site lower down on the hill on which the chieftain's rath was located. This was the site of Patrick's first Church. Once Daire was converted, the Saint was given the hill-top site, including the rath. Daire, ancestor to the O’Hanlons, endowed the bishop with lands surrounding the town to support its inhabitants. A group of twenty townlands were given to the church at a very early date, including the historic capital of Ulster, Navan Fort.

This line was committed to memory by bards and was eventually transcribed when the first missionaries brought writing to Ireland in the 5th century AD. The ancient writings from the 5th century onwards were compiled in 1632–1636 by a Franciscan friar, Michael O'Clery, into a volume which became known as the Milesian genealogies and survived to modern times.

== Ua'h-Ainlighe sept ==
The Ua'h-Ainlighe sept has its roots in the ancient recesses of the Roscommon Area and is associated with the tribe of Cinel Dobtha, or O'Hanley of Doohey Hanley, to which also belong the MacCoilidh family

The MacCoilidh family, whose name was anglicized to Cox in the early years of the seventeenth century, were hereditary custodians of Saint Berach crosier, and were considered as 'lay abbots' of Kilbarry. The crosier is now in the Dublin Museum.

=== The Ó Hanlons in the Milesian genealogies ===
Generation numbers as given in the Milesian genealogies.

- 89. Niallan – had two brothers: Fiachra Ceannfinan and Oronn
- 90. Eochaidh Dubhlen – had a brother Fiacha Sraibhtine
- 91. Muireadach, or Colla da Chrioch (Colla Fo Críth) – had two brothers, Carioll (Colla Uais) and Meann (Colla Meann)
- 92. Baodan, or Fiachra Cassán
- 93. Ronan
- 94. Suibhneach – had a brother Crunmoal
- 95. Colgan
- 96. Eagnach
- 97. Suibneach
- 98. Cosgrach – had a brother Cearnach
- 99. Dermod
- 100. Anluan (from an-luan, Gaelic for 'great champion')
- 101. Flann
- 102. Aodh (Hugh)
- 103. Dermod
- 104. Flaitheartach Ua'h-Anluain
- 105. Cumascach
- 106. Maccraith
- 107. Flann
- 108. Moroch – had a brother Giollapadraic
- 109. Ardgal
- 110. Moroch
- 111. Edmond
- 112. Eocha
- 113. John Ó Hanlon – had a brother Patrick Ó Hanlon
- 114. Eocha, son of John
- 115. Shane
- 116. Eocha
- 117. Shane
- 118. Giollapadraic Mór
- 119. Eocha (c. 1470–1530), fl. when Malachi was captain of the nation;
- 120. Shane (c.1490–1540)
- 121. Shane Oge (c. 1520–1570)
- 122. Eocha (Sir Oghy) Ó Hanlon (c. 1550–1607), had four brothers: Patrick, Melaghlin, Shane Oge, Felim
- 123. Owen Oghy Oge – had an older brother Tirlogh and a younger brother Edward.
- 124. Edmond Laidir
- 125. Padraig Ban
- 126. Glaisne
- 127. Brian "the Colonel", who saw service under James II.".

=== The Surname O'Hanlon ===
The O'Hanlons are cited throughout Ireland's ancient texts under the clan's ancient name of Ua'h-Anluain. The name means descendants of Anluain. Anluain was the head of one of the septs of Ui'Niallan, the descendants of Niallan. He was probably born around the end of the 7th century. The first mention of the name O’Hanlon (Ui Anluain) was in the first millennium, in the year 938 in the Annals of the Four Masters, which states: M983.6 Flaithbheartach Ua hAnluain, lord of Ui-Niallain, was treacherously slain by the Ui-Breasail.

=== The Kingdom of Airgialla ===
By 1004 The O’Hanlons are the de jure rulers of territory beginning at the townlands supporting the bishop at Armagh and stretching in an arc south and east to the mountains overlooking Viking settlements on Carlingford Lough. The last High King of Ireland, Brian Boru, makes a royal visit to Orior and Armagh in 1004, assessing the Viking presence. A decade later, Brian Boru defeated the combined forces of the Norsemen at Clontarf, assisted by The O’Hanlon. The king died at Clontarf. His body was carried through Orior on its way to interment at Armagh.

In 1150, the O’Hanlon chief had established himself as Lord of Oneillland (north County Armagh). Oneilland was the kingdom of Airgialla's northeastern outpost, adjacent to the kingdom of Tyrone and the Earldom of Ulster.

=== The Kingdom of Airthir ===
In the south east of Airghialla lay the Kingdom of Airthir, meaning Eastern (i.e. Eastern Airghialla). This was the stronghold of the Ua'h-Anluain. Airthir covered a large tract of what is now southern County Armagh, spilling over slightly into Counties Down, Louth and Monaghan. The Kingdom of Airthir was also known as Ind-tÁirthir, Oirthir and later Orior. The following were chiefs;

- Donnchad Ó hAnluain
- Ardghal Ó hAnluain
- Gilla Patraig Ó hAnluain (also Kings of Airgíalla)
- Murchadh Ó hAnluain
- Cu Uladh Ó hAnluain
- Eachmarcach Ó hAnluain
- Cu Ulad Ó hAnluain
- Niall Ó hAnluain
- Magnus Ó hAnluain
- Niall Ó hAnluain

=== The Middle Ages ===
By the Middle Ages Clann Ua'h-Anluain was one of Ireland's dynastic families and the clann's deeds are thoroughly documented in The Annals of The Four Masters, The Annals of Ulster, The Annals of Connacht and Mac Carthaigh's Book. They are cited as medieval chiefs of Ui Meith Tiri, Lords of Airthir, and occasionally Kings of Uí Nialláin, and Lords of Airghialla. (See Hanlons in ancient Irish texts for citations).

==== End of The Kingdom of Airghialla ====
The over-kingdom of Airgialla, which had gradually come under the domination of the Cenel Eoghain and pushed southwards, shrunk further in the advance of the Normans in the late 12th and early 13th century. Almost all of the Airgiallan sub-kingdom of Airthir was retained by the Ó Hanlons who lost only the southern tip of their territory to the Normans. The O'Hanlons continued to rule Orior without interruption for the next four centuries and were known henceforth as the lords of Orior.

The O'Hanlons lost the town of Dundalk in the south of Airthir (modern day County Louth), but were allowed to stay as paying tenants. The town's coat of arms still has an ermine boar representing the O'Hanlons supporting a shield with the De Verdon coat of arms.

1246. The O’Hanlons move south from Oneilland. Murrough O’Hanlon is described as "Lord of Orier". Orier included most of modern-day eastern County Armagh, stretching well into Louth, and over the Cooley mountains to the shore of Carlingford Lough.

1254. Following the Norman invasion of Ireland, "The O’Hanlon" is listed among the Ulster chieftains to whom the English King Henry III appealed for aid in his war against the Scots.

1273. Eochaidh "Eochy" O’Hanlon is listed as 'king of Orghialla'. It is the first known use of the name "Eochaidh" by the O'Hanlons, which means "horseman" or "jockey" in Gaelic. The name persists in the sept through the 17th century.

1285. Edward I sends The O’Hanlon a robe as a gift.

1312. Edward II styles The O’Hanlon, Nigellus, as "Duke of Orior".

1310. The O’Hanlon imposed 'black rents' upon English colonists living in and around Dundalk. Black Rent was insurance against incursions and other plundering; a colonist paid the rent, The O’Hanlon did not raid them in response to their trespass. It is thought that he levied the rent over areas south of Dundalk, too.

1314–1315. The O’Hanlon sept changes allegiances when Edward Bruce, in support of his brother Robert Bruce, in his war against the English, invaded Ireland and swept southwards. Bruce had seized O’Hanlon's son and heir, sent him to Scotland and demanded The O’Hanlon's good faith.

1321. Manus O’Hanlon, lord of Orior, is blinded by sept members under the leadership of his kinsman, Niall, son of Cu-Uladh O’Hanlon, on Spy Wednesday. Niall becomes lord of Orior, submitting to Edward III. The men of Dundalk march north and kill Niall.

1341. The men of Dundalk entered into a treaty with The O’Hanlon, formalizing the payment of Black Rent, and the document is approved by Edward III.

23 April 1346. Edward III grants protection to the O’Hanlon sept, security in their territorial lands, and in their possessions. But they must 'behave'.

c. 1350. Recorded in the Register of Archbishop Sweteman, "Malachy O’Hanloyn, King of Erthyr" was admonished to restore certain goods and clothing taken by a member of the O’Hanlon sept from the Archbishop's retinue.

1366. The Archbishop of Armagh several times excommunicated Malachy O’Hanlon, with all the members of the sept, as thieves of Church goods. A 7 December 1366 entry in the Archbishop's ledger notes that the O’Hanlons promised amendment and restitution, upon absolution, and they behaved worse and were again sentenced.

18 September 1367. Recorded in the Register of Archbishop Sweteman, "O’Handeloyn had prevented the clergy of the Cathedral from performing divine service in the church and had hindered and despoiled them". O’Hanlon deceived the Archbishop, even after receiving absolution for past crimes.

1380. The O’Hanlon, lord of Orior, was slain along with many English allies in a battle against the Magennis of Iveagh.

1391. The O’Hanlon, lord of Orior, is killed in an inter-sept civil war.

=== 15th century: Henry VII & VIII ===
1407. Archbishop Fleming's Register records on 1 May that the Archbishop excommunicated "Argallus O’Hanlan, Captain of his Nation, Malachy O’Hanlan and Odo McLoy, together with their familiar aiders and abettors, for various injuries inflicted upon himself and his tenants, especially for the slaying of Maurice Ddowgenan, his tenant and falconer". Fleming instructed the clergy to post "the excommunication and interdict on Sunday and festivals in all their churches and market places, while clad in albs and stoles, with cross erect, bells and candles, until further order". At the same time he warned "all, English and Irish, within his diocese to refrain from conversation, eating or drinking with the above-named persons, and desired that they should not be sold bread, beer, salt or any of the necessities of life".

1422. The O’Hanlon and the sept joined a predominantly Ulster-manned force, accompanying the Lord Deputy and English colonial allies on an expedition into Connachta.

1423. The O’Hanlon, with the Ulster Gaels attacked the English colonists of Louth and Meath, exacting black rents and taking plunder.

1424. The Lord Deputy and an army from Dublin ride against The O’Hanlon and other Ulster chieftains, forcing their renewed submission. This bonanza ended when the English sent a determined Viceroy to Ireland in 1424.

In the early 1490s, Henry VII appointed his son Henry, Duke of York, as Lord Lieutenant of Ireland. The future Henry the VIIIth did not actually go to Ireland. The Duke of York sent Sir Edward Poynings to Ireland as to serve as Lord Deputy. Poynings arrived on 13 October 1495, with a large army. He arrived on an island deeply divided in its collective identity. The emerging division was between the new Tudor royal administration (and its followers) and some of the Old English colonial elite, and their new allies among a resurgent Gaelic aristocracy. This was the result of English policy, administered between 1478 and 1492, when Gerald Fitzgerald, 8th Earl of Kildare, served as Lord Deputy. During these years, inter-marriage between the O'Neills of Tyrone and the Fitzgeralds brought the lead Gaelic sept into alliance with the leading Old English family.

The closer working relationship between Kildare and O'Neill gave Kildare access to the services of O'Neill's circle of leaders among the Roydama. Kildare worked closely with Malachi Ó Hanlon and The Magennis. Lord Deputy Poynings pursued a strategy of driving wedges between O'Neill and his allieds (including The Ó Hanlon and his neighbor, The Magennis), especially when those wedges would also prevent further bonding between the Gaelic lords and the Geraldine power base at Kildare. He demanded hostages (the sons, and heirs, of Ó Hanlon and Magennis) in order to secure their good behavior. When Ulster's march, or border, lords would not give up their sons, the Lord Deputy took the largest army assembled by the English colonists north to burn out both Orior and Iveagh, homelands to the Ó Hanlons and the Magennis. Being first through the Gap of the North, the Ó Hanlons were especially hard hit. Kildare advise Malachi Ó Hanlon to provide his son to Dublin Castle, to end the violence. So the Ó Hanlons suffered several defeats at the hands of Poynings. But they were supported quietly by their ally in the deposed Lord Deputy, Earl Kildare, who was widely rumoured to have supported the Ó Hanlons in their ongoing rebellion against the Tudor Crown. Following the Lord Deputy's raid, the Earl was charged with treason and the Act of Attainder (Nov. 1495) charged him with "encouraging Ó Hanlon," among other acts against the King. Ó Hanlon and Magennis testified on behalf of Kildare, in a deposition taken by the Archbishop of Armagh, Octavian de Palatio.

=== 16th century: Submission & Nine Years War ===
1537. Dublin Castle implements the Reformation in Ireland, dissolving monasteries and other religious institutions. This includes the ancient convent of St. Moninna at Killeavy, refuge for the women of the O’Hanlon sept. A smaller chapel and sanctuary survives until 1612, when the last Abbess, Alicia O’Hanlon, is removed from the precincts.

1564. Shane O’Neill, Earl of Tyrone, rebels against Elizabeth I. The O’Hanlon chooses to ride with the O’Neill. The Crown responds by seizing, in 1569, most of Orior. It is granted to Thomas Chatterton. He was required to 'subdue the natives' in County Armagh. He failed.

1569. By the Act of Confiscation, Elizabeth I transfers the O'Hanlon territory to the adventurer, Thomas Chatterton.

1573. Elizabeth I gives authority to Chatterton for "seven years to invade, subdue or expel, or bring to mercy the people of Ohrere".

1585 O'Daly writes "The Tribes of Ireland".

1587. The O’Hanlon resubmits to the Tudors, and is knighted Sir Eochaidh O’Hanlon, Baron of Orior. He is re-granted his lands on the condition of 'loyalty'. Oghy O’Hanlon, 'chief and captain of his nation' surrendered his territories in "Upper and Nether Orrye" on 20 September 1587. A new patent was issued on 1 December 1587, whereby O’Hanlon was confirmed in his lands for life, then to his heirs male, failing those, to his brothers. At the same time, Sir Oghie agreed to maintain twelve footmen called kerne and eight horsemen, all well armed, to attend upon the Lord Deputy, or other Governor of Ulster, in all hostings and risings and to maintain them in food and all necessities. Significantly the document also provided for the extinction of the title, The O’Hanlon of Orior. Sir Oghie agreed to pay the Queen £60 per year.

1593–1603, C.E. During the Nine Years' War, Sir Eochaidh moves his allegiance to accommodate the moving siege lines between Ulster and the English Pale. At times he was allied with Hugh O’Neill, Earl of Tyrone; at times he was allied with Henry Bagenal of Newry, the Queen's Marshal. A Turlough O’Hanlon fought for the Gaelic army under O’Neill at the Battle of the Yellow Ford (1598), in which Bagenal was killed.

The Nine Year War (1594–1603). After ascending to the throne in 1558, Queen Elizabeth I proclaimed herself head of the Irish Church (the Act of Supremacy), and went about replacing the "Old English" clergy and administrators with newly appointed Englishmen. The deposed "Old English" had fallen out of favour for their acquired local habits of dress, speaking Gaelic, and moderate sympathies with the native Irish. (After all, by the late 16th century it had been four hundred years since their arrival in Ireland with the Anglo-Norman advance.) The new administration was vehemently anti-Gael, but also anti-Catholic. To their horror, this meant the Galls (Gallic descendants of the Normans) suddenly found themselves out of favour too. Discontent led to an uprising of the Northern clans in 1594. It was led by the O'Neills – including some of the Ó Hanlons under Oghy Og, Sir Eocha's son – and the O'Donnells, supported by their new allies the Galls. The rebellion started in Ulster and spread all over Ireland to become the Nine Years' War. The Galls and the Gaels hoped for help from Catholic Spain but it was slow in coming. In September 1601, after seven years war in Ireland, the Spanish Armada sent 4,000 men to help Hugh O'Neill and Hugh O'Donnell. But the Armada landed at Kinsale in the South, while O'Neill and O'Donnell's strongholds were way up in the North. Against the odds, the Gaels marched South through enemy territory to meet the Spanish, and arrived in a matter of weeks with 12,000 men to lay siege to the English at Kinsale. By December 1601, the combined Spanish and Gael forces had the upper hand, but had been reduced to 10,000 men. Impatient to leave, the Spanish demanded an attack which took place on Christmas Eve 1601. It was disastrous and losing the Battle of Kinsale effectively marked the end of the Nine Years' War. Although the war ended formally only in March 1603 when O'Neill, Earl of Tyrone submitted to the English.

1599 Dymmock's 'Treatise on Ireland' notes that Sir Oghie O'Hanlon, on 28 April 1599, could muster two hundred foot and forty horse for the Earl of Tyrone. His territory reached from Newry to Armagh and was mostly 'without woods'.

=== 17th century: End of the Gaelic Lords ===
1600, 17 November Sir Eochaidh is, by some accounts, slain at the pass of Carlingford, fighting on the English side, bearing the Royal Standard for the Lord Deputy, Lord Mountjoy. For his loyalty and his services in this war against the Earl of Tyrone, King James I bestowed upon his family seven townlands.

1602, First Census of the Fews. This census was taken in 1602 to record the clanspeople of Turlagh MacHenry O'Neill, chief of the Fews (a Barony in southern Armagh neighbouring Orior). It survives today as the first census taken in Ireland and records five Ó Hanlon clansmen living as tenants: Many O Hanlon, Shane O Hanlon, Brain O Hanlon, Hugh O Hanlon, Glessny O Hanlon Turlagh MacHenry O'Neill was a half brother to the mighty Hugh O'Neill, Earl of Tyrone, and had initially cooperated with the English before joining his brother's forces in the Nine Years' War. After his brother's defeat at Kinsale, Turlagh received a pardon in 1602 for himself and all his clanspeople. Since the pardon did not extend to his brother's people, The Census of The Fews was compiled to list who the pardon applied to. Murder Committed before their rebellion, intrusion on Crown lands, and debts to the Crown excepted from their pardon. [Date destroyed] Lord Deputy's warrant dated 24 June 1602.

1604. Wasted during the Nine Years' War, Orior falls into successive crop failures and famines. Burden with relief of his people, Sir Eochaidh sells seven townlands adjacent to Newry.

1605. For his participation in the Nine Years' War on the side of O'Neill and the Gaelic lords young Oghie Og Ó Hanlon, son of the late Sir Oghy, could reasonably have expected to be charged with treason and hung – or worse. But he surrendered and in return Oghie Og was attainted, then pardoned on 12 February 1605. His family (i.e. his brothers, wife and sons) were able to stay on the family estates. But the pardon included a provision that Oghie Og himself must leave Ireland for exile in Europe. He is said to have done so and to have joined the Catholic armies of France and Spain in their wars against The Netherlands.

1607, Flight of the Earls. On 14 September 1607, the Earls of Tyrone and Donegal (The O'Neill and O'Donnell) fled Ireland with some 90 family and friends. The Flight of The Earls was construed by the English as an admission of guilt, and all those who left were charged with treason in their absence and their lands and livestock "reverted to the Crown". The Ó Hanlons could count themselves lucky, for in the absence of Oghie Og they knew the British did not consider them a threat, so felt safe enough to stay. They lost Hanlon castle but otherwise kept their lands while all around them their allies lost everything.

1608. Four years later his son and heir, Eochaidh Og, sided with Sir Cahir O’Dochertaigh in the ill-fated 1608 Rebellion. Eochaidh Og was denied succession and exiled to service for the King of Sweden, then fighting the Catholic army of the King of Poland.

1609, Plantation of Ulster. In the Plantation of Ulster most of the remaining Gaelic chieftains had their lands escheated (confiscated) and reassigned to Scottish or English foreigners. Only a few lucky "natives" were awarded land grants. In the "Precinct of Orier" the Ó Hanlons figured prominently: they accounted for 10 of the 39 grants made to "natives".

PLANTATION OF ULSTER – PRECINCT OF ORIER

LAND GRANTS TO NATIVES

Grant No.	Name	Acres
3	Tirlogh Groome Ó Hanlon, gent.	140
4	Shane McShane Ó Hanlon, gent.	100
5	Shane McShane Ó Hanlon, gent.	100
6	Oghie Oge Ó Hanlon's two sons, Felim and Brian, gents	200
7	Rorie McFerdoragh Ó Hanlon, gent.	120
8	Shane Oge McShane Roe Ó Hanlon, gent.	120
11	Patrick McManus Ó Hanlon and Ardell Moore O'Mulchrewe	120
12	Redmond McFerdoragh Ó Hanlon	60
30	Patrick Moder (Ó Hanlon ?), gent.	120
39	Ardill McFelim Ó Hanlon, gent.	80

1611. The O’Hanlons are ousted from control of Orior, and from their castle at Tanderagee, which is taken over by Oliver St. John.

1641. The O’Hanlons join the 1641 rebellion, under the leadership of Sir Phelim O’Neill. Ardall O’Hanlon was injured fighting with Eoghan Ruadh O’Neill at the Battle of Clones. In County Armagh, the sept regains Tandragee Castle for a few years, until the Lord Protector, Oliver Cromwell, arrives to put all Ireland down. The remaining O’Hanlon landowners were dispossessed through the Act of Settlement in Ireland (1652).

1662. Hugh O’Hanlon petitions Charles II for a restoration of the O’Hanlon lands in County Armagh, but is denied as much in the Act of Settlement passed in 1662.

1669. Dispossessed but remaining in the southern highlands of their former homeland, the O’Hanlons take to a life of crime against the English colonial administration, its colonists, and their collaborators among the former Gaels, now Irish. These "Tories" or "Raparees" become skilled highwaymen. Loughlin O’Hanlon of Killeavy is sentenced to death for horse theft; sentence later commuted.

1674. Aodh Ruadh "Redmond" O’Hanlon is first recorded as active on the highways of County Armagh. He was proclaimed as an outlaw and a reward of £200 was offered for his capture.

== Depiction of Clan Ó Hanlon sept, or Clan members, in popular media ==
Depiction of the Clan O’Hanlon and its members in popular culture dates to the emergence of early mass media in Great Britain after the Restoration. The Irish people's preservation – and perhaps well-intended enhancement—of Comte Redmond O’Hanlon's life and exploits established an image which mass media vehicles would exploit in future years. This was a trend even as the descendants and relatives of the Comte remained the victims of circumstances established by the system created through the Penal Laws after 1690. In 1862, William Carleton's Redmond, Count O’Hanlon, The Irish Raparee, An Historical Tale was published in Dublin and London. The non-fiction work was one a series of novels published by Carleton in the wake of the Celtic revival of the 18th century and its echoes through the 19th century. Not unlike Blaxploitation of the 1970s, it is heavily laden with stereotypes appealing to the mass culture of its day, an industrialized proletarian and emerging bourgeoisie suffering from cultural dislocation and the identity crisis it produced. Works like Carleton's sold because they allegedly offered 'authenticity' in a world remaking itself and increasing cut off from the Irish clan system. In Redmond, Count O’Hanlon, Carleton presents little or no information regarding the Count or his family, except that they were early Jacobites dispossessed for their loyalty to the House of Stuart. Redmond himself is depicted as crafty, yet well-mannered. An Irish Robin Hood or Rob Roy MacGregor coming to the rescue of a fair maiden and her distressed fiancée, as her chastity (and his property) were threatened by a debauched son of the Anglo-Irish colonial elite ruling south Armagh.

== Lists of prominent Hanlons and Ó Hanlons, those with an Irish derivation ==
These may be found at Hanlon and O'Hanlon

== See also ==
- Irish clans
