= Michael Hannan (composer) =

Australian pianist (born 1949)

Michael Francis Hannan (born 1949) is an Australian composer, keyboardist, and musicologist. Described in Baker's Biographical Dictionary of Musicians as a composer "exceptionally gifted for the exploration of tonal, polytonal, and atonal techniques", Hannan is also the author of a critical biography of the Australian composer Peter Sculthorpe. He has been a music professor at Southern Cross University since 1986.

== Life and career ==
Hannan was born in Newcastle, New South Wales. He studied musicology at the University of Sydney where he received his BA in 1972 and his PhD in 1979, followed by a diploma in music composition in 1982. He then spent a year in Los Angeles on a Fulbright scholarship carrying out postdoctoral research on ethnomusicology at UCLA as well as studying composition with Elaine Barkin. During the 1970s and early 1980s he also worked as commercial composer and arranger, rock performer, piano accompanist, music journalist and music editor. In 1986 Hannan was appointed to the Northern Rivers College of Advanced Education (now Southern Cross University) to develop a BA program in contemporary popular music (the first in Australia) and in 1987 became head of the college's Performing Arts and Music Divisions. As of 2015 he remains an adjunct professor of music in the Southern Cross University School of Arts and Social Sciences.

Hannan's early academic career was particularly associated with the work of Australian composer Peter Sculthorpe. He first became interested in Sculthorpe's piano compositions while still a high school student in New South Wales and decided to write his final year music essay on the composer, which according to musicologist Graeme Skinner proved to be "the most thorough and perceptive analysis of Scunthorpe's output to date [1967]". One of Hannan's instructors at the University of New England summer school had arranged a meeting with the composer which in turn led to Hannan working as Sculthorpe's assistant from 1969 to 1971 and for other shorter periods throughout the 1970s. Sculthorpe dedicated his three pieces composed for solo piano in 1971, Snow, Moon, and Flowers, to Hannan who went on to write his undergraduate honours dissertation on Sculthorpe's piano music. In 1980–1981 Hannan studied composition under Sculthorpe and in 1982 published Peter Sculthorpe: His music and ideas, 1929–1979. The book was the first published biography of Sculthorpe and primarily focused on a critical analysis of Sculthorpe's compositional techniques and their origins.

Hannan's own compositions explore tonal as well as polytonal, and atonal techniques and are often leavened with humour, e.g., the radiophonic works Alphabeat and Slonimsky Variations and Beespeak and Cat's Night Out for trumpet and digital manipulation. His piano compositions frequently involve pieces for pianos whose interiors have been altered in some way, including burning pianos. His 2003 Burning Questions, a radiophonic work commissioned by ABC Radio National included the sounds of a burning baby grand piano, the observers' reactions, and Hannan playing Beethoven's Moonlight Sonata on the piano prior to setting it alight. The sounds of nature, especially bird calls, have also figured prominently in his later work.

== Recordings ==
- Voices (1995). Australian works for solo piano (includes Hannan's Resonances I). Roger Smalley (pianist). Label: Tall Poppies Records
- Cello Dreaming (1998). Australian works for solo cello (includes Hannan's Raja). David Pereira (cellist). Label: Tall Poppies Records
- Terrains (2001). Piano music by Peter Sculthorpe and Michael Hannan (includes Hannan's Piano Collage I and II, Desert Dance, Cicadas, Cageian Loops, Circle Journey, Valley of the Winds, and Piano Chant). Michael Hannan (pianist). Label: Tall Poppies Records

== Books ==
- Hannan, Michael (1982). Peter Sculthorpe: His Music and Ideas, 1929–1979. University of Queensland Press. ISBN 0702215899
- Hannan, Michael (2003). The Australian Guide to Careers in Music. University of New South Wales Press. ISBN 0868405108
- Hannan, Michael (2014). The Music of Richard Meale (Australian Composers series). Wildbird Music. ISBN 0987514512
