= John O'Hanlon (Lackaghmore) =

John O'Hanlon (Galway) (1889 – 2 October 1920) was shot by British forces during the Irish War of Independence.

O'Hanlon was a native of Lackaghmore, County Galway. A detachment of the Black and Tans arrived at his house and he ran out the back door. He made it as far as the stile but the area was surrounded and he was shot dead. The unit said that they had called on him three times to stop. His wife was absent from the house and it was not till the following morning, on Sunday, that she returned home and found his body.

His funeral was held at Lackagh but on word from a local policeman it was shifted back an hour from three o'clock. At three o'clock two lorries of Royal Irish Constabulary arrived and became angry to find the funeral over (a local paper later related that had come from Tuam direction and were firing the whole way out and several people travelling on the road had narrow escapes). They fired shots into the graveyard, in the village of Turloughmore and severely assault many people on the fair green. They then followed Mrs. O'Hanlon's family, shooting at and assaulting the family.

He was survived by his wife, Mary Curley and two children, including a nine-month-old son. This son, Billy, in later life gave an interview concerning the events of that day as related by his family and neighbours. Billy had twelve children with his wife Lizzie, and died in 2016.

O'Hanlon was secretary to the local branch of Sinn Féin and one of several civilians and nationalists to die in County Galway during 1920.
