= Robin Schofield =

New Zealand cricketer

Personal information
- Full name: Robin Matthew Schofield
- Born: 6 November 1939; Hokitika, New Zealand
- Died: 6 January 1990 (aged 50); Puketapu, Taradale, New Zealand
- Batting: Right-handed
- Bowling: Slow left-arm wrist-spin
- Role: Wicket-keeper
- Relatives: Sara McGlashan (granddaughter); Peter McGlashan (grandson)

Domestic team information
- Years: Team
- 1959/60–1974/75: Central Districts

Career statistics
Competition	First-class	List A
Matches	53	2
Runs scored	1,082	2
Batting average	17.73	2.00
100s/50s	0/2	0/0
Top score	55*	2
Balls bowled	262	0
Wickets	5	–
Bowling average	32.40	–
5 wickets in innings	0	–
10 wickets in match	0	–
Best bowling	2/42	–
Catches/stumpings	110/15	3/1
- Source: Cricinfo, 14 March 2018

Robin Matthew Schofield (6 November 1939 – 6 January 1990) was a New Zealand first-class cricketer who played for Central Districts from 1960 to 1975.

Robin Schofield began his first-class career in 1959–60 as a bowler of left-arm wrist-spin, when he played three matches and took five wickets. He then disappeared from first-class cricket until he re-emerged in 1964–65 as a wicket-keeper. Against Wellington in the first match of the Plunket Shield season he took seven catches in the first innings and nine in the match, setting new records for New Zealand first-class cricket.

He kept wicket for Central Districts for most of the next ten years, and made useful runs in the lower order. He also played Hawke Cup cricket for Hawke's Bay from 1960 to 1974, scoring a century when they took the title from Marlborough in 1968.

Schofield was a schoolteacher in Taradale, near Napier. He died in an accident while cutting firewood at his home in Puketapu.

The cricketers Sara McGlashan and Peter McGlashan are his grandchildren.
