= Gillespie (surname) =

Gillespie (/ɡɪˈlɛspi/ ghih-LES-pee) is both a masculine given name and a surname in the English language. Variants include Gillaspie and Gillispie.

== Origins ==
The given name is an Anglicised form of the Gaelic Gille Easbaig (also rendered Gilleasbaig), meaning "bishop's servant". The surname Gillespie is an Anglicised form of the Scottish Gaelic Mac Gille Easbuig, and the Irish Mac Giolla Easpaig, both of which mean "bishop's servant's son". The given name itself is ultimately derived from a word of Greek origin, the Old Irish epscop being derived via the Latin episcopus from Greek επίσκοπος, epískopos, 'overseer'.

An early example of the name in Scotland occurs in a charter dated 1175–1199, recording a certain "Ewano filio Gillaspeck". In Ireland, a family bearing the surname occupied the office of toísech of Clann Aílebra in the late twelfth century. In 1172, for example, the toísech was slain by Donn Slébe Ua hEochada, King of Ulster. This slain Mac Gilla Espuic may be identical to a certain Gilla Óengusa mac Gilla Espuic, rechtaire of the Monaig of Ulster, who is earlier recorded in the king's service. Whatever the case, a later family bearing the surname appears on record as erenaghs of Kilraine in County Donegal. During the 16th and 17th centuries in Ireland, the surname was most common in Ulster. During the nineteenth century in Ireland, the surname was most numerous in the counties of Antrim, Donegal, Armagh, and Tyrone. Scottish Gaelic forms of the surname include GillEasbuig and GillEasbaig.

== Gillespie ==
- A. Arnold Gillespie (1899–1978), American cinema special effects artist
- Aaron Gillespie (born 1983), American rock singer & drummer
- Alastair Gillespie (1922–2018), Canadian politician
- Albert Gillespie (1912–1938), Australian cricketer and Royal Air Force officer
- Alexander Gillespie (1776–1859), Scottish surgeon
- Alexandra Gillespie, historian and professor at the University of Toronto
- Andra Gillespie, American political scientist
- Archibald H. Gillespie (1810–1873), officer in the United States Marine Corps
- Bill Gillespie (journalist) (born 1946), Canadian journalist and author
- Bill Gillespie (politician) (1928–2008), American politician
- Bill Gillespie (footballer) (1887–1927), Australian footballer
- Billy Gillespie (1891–1981), Irish football (soccer) player
- Bobby Gillespie (born 1962), Scottish rock and roll musician
- Brock Gillespie (born 1982), American expatriate basketball player
- Charles Gillespie (1883–1964), New Zealand rugby union player and soldier
- Charles A. Gillespie Jr. (1935–2008), American diplomat
- Charlie Gillespie (born 1998), Canadian actor and singer
- Collin Gillespie (born 1999), American basketball player
- Craig Gillespie (born 1967), Australian film director
- Dan Gillespie Sells (born 1979), English singer
- Dana Gillespie (born 1949), British actress and singer
- Daniel Gillespie (1938–2017), American physicist
- Darlene Gillespie (born 1941), Mousketeer born in Canada
- David Gillespie (disambiguation), several people
- Dean M. Gillespie (1884–1949), American politician
- Dizzy Gillespie (1917–1993), American jazz musician
- Earl Gillespie (1922–2003), American sportscaster
- Ed Gillespie (born 1961), American politician
- Floris Gillespie (1882–1967), Scottish painter
- Gary Gillespie (born 1960), Scottish footballer
- George Gillespie (1613–1648), Scottish theologian
- George Lewis Gillespie Jr. (1841–1913), US Army officer
- Gina Gillespie (born 1951), American former child actress, now an attorney
- Gregor Gillespie (born 1987), 4x NCAA Division 1 All-American Wrestler
- Iain Gillespie (born 1997), bassist and vocalist for the band Bears in Trees
- Haven Gillespie (1888–1975), American composer and lyricist
- Jacqueline Pascarl-Gillespie (born 1963), Australian author
- Ja'Kobi Gillespie (born 2004), American basketball player
- James Gillespie (disambiguation), several people
- Janetta Gillespie (1876–1956), Scottish artist
- Jason Gillespie (born 1975), Australian cricketer
- John Gillespie (disambiguation), several people
- Joseph Gillespie (1809–1885), American politician
- Keith Gillespie (born 1975), Northern Irish footballer
- Kevin Gillespie (disambiguation), several people
- Lara Gillespie (born 2001), Irish professional racing cyclist
- Margaret V. Gillespie (born 1969), American politician
- Mark Gillespie (disambiguation), several people
- Michael Allen Gillespie (born 1951), American philosopher and social scientist
- Mike Gillespie (disambiguation), several people
- Mitch Gillespie (born 1959), American politician
- Norm Gillespie, association football coach in Australia in the 1940s
- Nick Gillespie (born 1963), American editor and political writer
- Paul Gillespie (1920–1970), Major League Baseball catcher
- Phillip Gillespie (born 1975), Australian cricket umpire
- Robert Gillespie (disambiguation), several people
- Ronald Gillespie (1924–2021), Canadian chemist
- Rosemary Gillespie (1941–2010), Australian lawyer and activist
- Rosemary Gillespie (biologist), Scottish-born American biologist
- Ross Gillespie (1935–2023), New Zealand hockey player
- Steven Gillespie (born 1985), English footballer
- Stuart Gillespie (born 1957), New Zealand cricketer
- Thomas Gillespie (disambiguation), several people
- Tyree Gillespie (born 1998), American football player
- William Gillespie (disambiguation), several people

=== Fictional characters ===
- Alessa Gillespie and Dahlia Gillespie, in the Silent Hill video game series
- Chief Bill Gillespie, in the novel In the Heat of the Night and its film and television adaptations
- Dr. Leonard Gillespie, in the Dr. Kildare and Dr. Gillespie film series
- Rudy Gillespie, on the television series Kickin' It
- Martin Gillespie, in the television series Byker Grove

== Gillaspie ==
- Conor Gillaspie (born 1987), American baseball player
- Kayne Gillaspie (born 1979), American fashion designer
- Logan Gillaspie (born 1997), American baseball player

== Gillispie ==
- Billy Gillispie (born 1959), American basketball coach
- Charles Coulston Gillispie (1918–2015), American historian of science
- Connor Gillispie (born 1997), American baseball player

== See also ==
- Tara Gilesbie, author of My Immortal
- Gillespie (disambiguation)
