= William Gillespie =

William or Bill Gillespie may refer to:

- William Gillespie (actor) (1894–1938), Scottish actor
- William Gillespie (New Zealand politician) (1893–1961), New Zealand politician of the National Party
- William Ernest Gillespie (1912–1967), American educator
- William John Gillespie (1897–1967), Canadian World War I flying ace
- Willie Earl Gillespie (born 1961), American football wide receiver
- Bill Gillespie (journalist) (born 1946), Canadian journalist and author
- Bill Gillespie (politician) (1928–2008), American politician
- Bill Gillespie (footballer) (1887–1927), Australian rules footballer
- Bill Gillespie (rugby league) (1894–1945), Australian rugby league player
- Billie Gillespie (1873–1942), English footballer
- Billy Gillespie (1891–1981), Irish footballer
- William David Gillespie (1934–2025), New Zealand rugby union player
