= Glaspie =

Glaspie is a surname. Notable people with the surname include:

- Andrew Bird Glaspie (1876–1943), American politician and college football coach
- April Glaspie (born 1942), American diplomat
- Nikki Glaspie (born 1983), American drummer

== See also ==
- Gillespie (disambiguation)
- Gillespie (surname)
