= Glasby =

Glasby is an English language surname of Scottish origin, a contracted form of Gillespie. The suffix "by" was in Norse, town, there are many towns in North England with this naming tradition. Notable people with the surname include:

- John Glasby (1928–2011), English author
- Tarryn Glasby (born 1995), South African field hockey player
- Tim Glasby (born 1989), Australian rugby league footballer
