= New Zealand at the Men's T20 World Cup =

New Zealand national team performance at T20 World Cup

The New Zealand national cricket team is one of the full members of the International Cricket Council (ICC), the governing body of cricket. There have been nine editions of the T20 World Cup and New Zealand has participated in every edition. They have finished as the runners-up of the tournament twice in 2021 and 2026, and have also been semi-finalists in three editions (2007, 2016 and 2022). In the most recent edition in 2026, New Zealand reached the final with six wins and two losses, where they lost to India by 96 runs. They have an overall win–loss record of 30–22 from 56 matches.

New Zealand is scheduled to host their first ever T20 World Cup in 2028, as co-hosts alongside Australia.

== T20 World Cup record ==
Legend

- Champions
- Runners-up
- Third place/Semi-finals
- Hosts

Year	Round	Position	GP	W	L	T+W	T+L	NR	Ab (Note: Abandoned matches are not counted in the official records.)	Captain
(South Africa) 2007	Semi-final	4/12	6	3	3	0	0	0	0	Daniel Vettori
(England) 2009	Super 8	5/12	5	2	3	0	0	0	0	Daniel Vettori
(Cricket West Indies) 2010	Super 8	5/12	5	3	2	0	0	0	0	Daniel Vettori
(Sri Lanka) 2012	Super 8	7/12	5	1	2	0	2	0	0	Ross Taylor
(Bangladesh) 2014	Super 10	6/16	4	2	2	0	0	0	0	Brendon McCullum
(India) 2016	Semi-final	3/16	5	4	1	0	0	0	0	Kane Williamson
(United Arab Emirates) (Oman) 2021	Runners-up	2/16	7	5	2	0	0	0	0	Kane Williamson
(Australia) 2022	Semi-final	4/16	5	3	2	0	0	0	1	Kane Williamson
(Cricket West Indies) (United States) 2024	Group stage	10/20	4	2	2	0	0	0	0	Kane Williamson
(India) (Sri Lanka) 2026	Runners-up	2/20	9	5	3	0	0	1	0	Mitchell Santner
(Australia) (New Zealand) 2028	Qualified as hosts									
Total	0 titles	10/10	56	30	22	0	2	1	1	—N/a

=== Record by opponents ===
Positive Record Neutral Record Negative Record

Opponent	M	W	L	T+W	T+L	NR	Ab	Win %	First played
Afghanistan	4	2	1	0	0	0	1	66.67	2021
Australia	3	2	1	0	0	0	0	66.67	2016
Bangladesh	2	2	0	0	0	0	0	100	2012
Canada	1	1	0	0	0	0	0	100	2026
England	8	3	5	0	0	0	0	37.50	2007
India	4	3	1	0	0	0	0	75.00	2007
Ireland	2	2	0	0	0	0	0	100	2009
Kenya	1	1	0	0	0	0	0	100	2007
Namibia	1	1	0	0	0	0	0	100	2021
Netherlands	1	1	0	0	0	0	0	100	2014
Pakistan	8	2	5	0	0	1	0	25.00	2007
Papua New Guinea	1	1	0	0	0	0	0	100	2024
Scotland	2	2	0	0	0	0	0	100	2009
South Africa	6	1	5	0	0	0	0	16.67	2007
Sri Lanka	7	3	3	0	1	0	0	42.86	2007
Uganda	1	1	0	0	0	0	0	100	2024
United Arab Emirates	1	1	0	0	0	0	0	100	2026
West Indies	2	0	1	0	1	0	0	25.00	2012
Zimbabwe	1	1	0	0	0	0	0	100	2010
Total	56	30	22	0	2	1	1	54.54	—
Source: Last Updated: 8 March 2026

== Tournament results ==
=== 2007 World Cup ===
Squad and kit

- Daniel Vettori (c)
- Brendon McCullum (wk)
- Shane Bond
- Mark Gillespie
- Chris Martin
- Nathan McCullum
- Jeetan Patel
- Jacob Oram
- Scott Styris
- Bradley Scott
- Peter Fulton
- Gareth Hopkins (wk)
- Craig McMillan
- Ross Taylor
- Lou Vincent

2007 kit

Results

Group stage (Group C)			Super 8s (Group E)				Semifinal	Final	Overall Result
Opposition Result	Opposition Result	Rank	Opposition Result	Opposition Result	Opposition Result	Rank	Opposition Result	Opposition Result	Overall Result
Kenya; Won by 9 wickets	Sri Lanka; Won by 7 wickets	2	India; Won by 10 runs	England; Won by 5 runs	South Africa; Lost by 6 wickets	2	Pakistan; Lost by 6 wickets	Did not advance	Semifinals
Source: Cricinfo

Scorecards

Group stage (Group C)

12 September
10:00
(scorecard)

Kenya; 73 (16.5 overs)	v	New Zealand; 74/1 (7.4 overs)
Collins Obuya 18 (25); Mark Gillespie 4/7 (2.5 overs)		Lou Vincent 27 (20); Thomas Odoyo 1/22 (3 overs)

New Zealand won by 9 wickets
Kingsmead, Durban
Umpires: Billy Doctrove (WI) and Simon Taufel (Aus)
Player of the match: Mark Gillespie (NZ)

- New Zealand won the toss and elected to field.

15 September
14:00
(scorecard)

New Zealand; 164/7 (20 overs)	v	Sri Lanka; 168/3 (18.5 overs)
Ross Taylor 62 (42); Dilhara Fernando 2/31 (4 overs)		Sanath Jayasuriya 61 (44); Daniel Vettori 2/23 (4 overs)

Sri Lanka won by 7 wickets
Wanderers Stadium, Johannesburg
Umpires: Mark Benson (Eng) Daryl Harper (Aus)
Player of the match: Sanath Jayasuriya (SL)

- New Zealand won the toss and elected to bat.

Super 8 (Group E)

16 September
10:00
(scorecard)

New Zealand; 190 (20 overs)	v	India; 180/9 (20 overs)
Brendon McCullum 45 (31); Harbhajan Singh 2/24 (4 overs)		Gautam Gambhir 51 (33); Daniel Vettori 4/20 (4 overs)

New Zealand won by 10 runs
Wanderers Stadium, Johannesburg
Umpires: Mark Benson (Eng) and Nigel Llong (Eng)
Player of the match: Daniel Vettori (NZ)

- India won the toss and elected to field.

18 September
10:00
(scorecard)

New Zealand; 164/9 (20 overs)	v	England; 159/8 (20 overs)
Craig McMillan 57 (31); James Anderson 2/24 (4 overs)		Darren Maddy 50 (31); Shane Bond 2/20 (4 overs)

New Zealand won by 5 runs
Kingsmead, Durban
Umpires: Billy Doctrove (WI) and Simon Taufel (Aus)
Player of the match: Craig McMillan (NZ)

- England won the toss and elected to field.

19 September
14:00
(scorecard)

New Zealand; 153/8 (20 overs)	v	South Africa; 158/4 (19.1 overs)
Craig McMillan 48 (25); Morné Morkel 4/16 (4 overs)		Justin Kemp 89* (56); Mark Gillespie 2/11 (3.1 overs)

South Africa won by 6 wickets
Kingsmead, Durban
Umpires: Billy Doctrove (WI) and Simon Taufel (Aus)
Player of the match: Justin Kemp (SA)

- South Africa won the toss and elected to field.

Knockout stage

Semi-final 1
22 September
13:00
Scorecard

New Zealand; 143/8 (20 overs)	v	Pakistan; 147/4 (18.5 overs)
Ross Taylor 37* (23); Umar Gul 3/15 (4 overs)		Imran Nazir 59 (41); Scott Styris 1/14 (3 overs)

Pakistan won by 6 wickets
Newlands Cricket Ground, Cape Town
Attendance: 18,734
Umpires: Daryl Harper (Aus) and Simon Taufel (Aus)
Player of the match: Umar Gul (Pak)

- New Zealand won the toss and elected to bat.

=== 2009 World Cup ===
Squad and kit

- Daniel Vettori (c)
- Neil Broom
- Ian Butler
- Brendon Diamanti
- James Franklin
- Martin Guptill
- Brendon McCullum (wk)
- Nathan McCullum
- Peter McGlashan
- Kyle Mills
- Iain O'Brien
- Jacob Oram
- Aaron Redmond
- Scott Styris
- Ross Taylor

2009 kit

Results

Group stage (Group D)			Super 8s (Group F)				Semifinal	Final	Overall Result
Opposition Result	Opposition Result	Rank	Opposition Result	Opposition Result	Opposition Result	Rank	Opposition Result	Opposition Result	Overall Result
Scotland; Won by 7 wickets	South Africa; Lost by 1 run	2	Ireland; Won by 83 runs	Pakistan; Lost by 6 wickets	Sri Lanka; Lost by 48 runs	3	Did not advance		Super 8s
Source: Cricinfo

Scorecards

Group stage (Group D)

6 June 2009
10:00
Scorecard

Scotland; 89/4 (7 overs)	v	New Zealand; 90/3 (6 overs)
Kyle Coetzer 33 (15); Ian Butler 3/19 (2 overs)		Jesse Ryder 31 (12); Ryan Watson 1/4 (1 overs)

New Zealand won by 7 wickets
The Oval, London
Umpires: Billy Doctrove (WI) and Daryl Harper (Aus)
Player of the match: Ian Butler (NZ)

- New Zealand won the toss and elected to field.
- Match reduced to 7 overs per side.

9 June 2009
17:30 (D/N)
Scorecard

South Africa; 128/7 (20 overs)	v	New Zealand; 127/5 (20 overs)
Graeme Smith 33 (35); Ian Butler 2/13 (4 overs)		Brendon McCullum 57 (54); Roelof van der Merwe 2/14 (4 overs)

South Africa won by 1 run
Lord's, London
Umpires: Asad Rauf (Pak) and Daryl Harper (Aus)
Player of the match: Roelof van der Merwe (SA)

- New Zealand won the toss and elected to field.

Super 8 (Group F)

11 June 2009
13:30
Scorecard

New Zealand; 198/5 (20 overs)	v	Ireland; 115 (16.4 overs)
Aaron Redmond 63 (30); Kyle McCallan 2/33 (4 overs)		Andre Botha 28 (17); Nathan McCullum 3/15 (3 overs)

New Zealand won by 83 runs
Trent Bridge, Nottingham
Umpires: Asoka de Silva (SL) and Marais Erasmus (SA)
Player of the match: Aaron Redmond (NZ)

- Ireland won the toss and elected to field.

13 June 2009
17:30 (D/N)
Scorecard

New Zealand; 99 (18.3 overs)	v	Pakistan; 100/4 (13.1 overs)
Scott Styris 22 (29); Umar Gul 5/6 (3 overs)		Shahzaib Hasan 35 (28); Daniel Vettori 2/20 (4 overs)

Pakistan won by 6 wickets
The Oval, London
Umpires: Mark Benson (Eng) and Rod Tucker (Aus)
Player of the match: Umar Gul (Pak)

- New Zealand won the toss and elected to bat.

16 June 2009
13:30
Scorecard

Sri Lanka; 158/5 (20 overs)	v	New Zealand; 110 (17 overs)
Tillakaratne Dilshan 48 (37); DL Vettori 2/32 (4 overs)		Martin Guptill 43 (34); Ajantha Mendis 3/9 (3 overs)

Sri Lanka won by 48 runs
Trent Bridge, Nottingham
Umpires: Steve Davis (Aus) and Simon Taufel (Aus)
Player of the match: Ajantha Mendis (SL)

- Sri Lanka won the toss and elected to bat.
- New Zealand were eliminated as a result of this match.

=== 2010 World Cup ===
Squad and kit

- Daniel Vettori (c)
- Shane Bond
- Ian Butler
- Martin Guptill
- Gareth Hopkins (wk)
- Brendon McCullum (wk)
- Nathan McCullum
- Kyle Mills
- Rob Nicol
- Jacob Oram
- Aaron Redmond
- Jesse Ryder
- Tim Southee
- Scott Styris
- Ross Taylor

2010 kit

Results

Group stage (Group B)			Super 8s (Group E)				Semifinal	Final	Overall Result
Opposition Result	Opposition Result	Rank	Opposition Result	Opposition Result	Opposition Result	Rank	Opposition Result	Opposition Result	Overall Result
Sri Lanka; Won by 2 wickets	Zimbabwe; Won by 7 runs (DLS)	1	South Africa; Lost by 13 runs	Pakistan; Won by 1 run	England; Lost by 3 wickets	3	Did not advance		Super 8s
Source: Cricinfo

Scorecards

Group stage (Group B)

30 April
13:00
Scorecard

Sri Lanka; 135/6 (20 overs)	v	New Zealand; 139/8 (19.5 overs)
Mahela Jayawardene 81 (51); Shane Bond 2/35 (4 overs)		Jesse Ryder 42 (27); Muttiah Muralitharan 2/25 (4 overs)

New Zealand won by 2 wickets
Providence Stadium, Guyana
Umpires: Steve Davis (Aus) and Rudi Koertzen (SA)
Player of the match: Nathan McCullum (NZ)

- Sri Lanka won the toss and elected to bat.

4 May
09:30
Scorecard

Zimbabwe; 84 (15.1 overs)	v	New Zealand; 36/1 (8.1 overs)
Tatenda Taibu 21 (14); Scott Styris 3/5 (2 overs)		Brendon McCullum 22* (26); Prosper Utseya 1/21 (4 overs)

New Zealand won by 7 runs (D/L)
Providence Stadium, Guyana
Umpires: Asad Rauf (Pak) and Steve Davis (Aus)
Player of the match: Nathan McCullum (NZ)

- New Zealand won the toss and elected to field.
- Rain reduced New Zealand's innings to 8.1 overs. According to the Duckworth–Lewis method, their target was 30 runs.
- New Zealand qualified for the Super 8s as a result of this match.

Super 8 (Group E)

6 May
13:30
Scorecard

South Africa; 170/4 (20 overs)	v	New Zealand; 157/7 (20 overs)
AB de Villiers 47* (39); Jacob Oram 1/22 (3 overs)		Jesse Ryder 33 (28); Johan Botha 2/23 (3 overs)

South Africa won by 13 runs
Kensington Oval, Bridgetown
Umpires: Aleem Dar (Pak) and Steve Davis (Aus)
Player of the match: Albie Morkel (SA)

- South Africa won the toss and elected to bat.

8 May
09:30
Scorecard

New Zealand; 133/7 (20 overs)	v	Pakistan; 132/7 (20 overs)
Daniel Vettori 38 (34); Abdur Rehman 2/19 (3 overs)		Salman Butt 67* (54); Ian Butler 3/19 (4 overs)

New Zealand won by 1 run
Kensington Oval, Bridgetown
Umpires: Billy Doctrove (WI) and Ian Gould (Eng)
Player of the match: Ian Butler (NZ)

- Pakistan won the toss and elected to field.

10 May
13:30
Scorecard

New Zealand; 149/6 (20 overs)	v	England; 153/7 (19.1 overs)
Ross Taylor 44 (33); Graeme Swann 2/31 (4 overs)		Eoin Morgan 40 (34); Scott Styris 2/16 (3 overs)

England won by 3 wickets
Beausejour Stadium, Gros Islet
Umpires: Steve Davis (Aus) and Simon Taufel (Aus)
Player of the match: Tim Bresnan (Eng)

- New Zealand won the toss and elected to bat.

=== 2012 World Cup ===
Squad and kit

- Ross Taylor (c)
- Brendon McCullum (vc, wk)
- Doug Bracewell
- James Franklin
- Martin Guptill
- Ronnie Hira
- Nathan McCullum
- Kyle Mills
- Adam Milne
- Rob Nicol
- Jacob Oram
- Tim Southee
- Daniel Vettori
- BJ Watling (wk)
- Kane Williamson

2012 kit

Results

Group stage (Group D)			Super 8s (Group E)				Semifinal	Final	Overall Result
Opposition Result	Opposition Result	Rank	Opposition Result	Opposition Result	Opposition Result	Rank	Opposition Result	Opposition Result	Overall Result
Bangladesh; Won by 59 runs	Pakistan; Lost by 13 runs	2	Sri Lanka; Tied (Lost the S/O)	England; Lost by 6 wickets	West Indies; Tied (Lost the S/O)	4	Did not advance		Super 8s
Source: Cricinfo

Scorecards

Group stage (Group D)

21 September 2012
15:30 (D/N)
Scorecard

New Zealand; 191/3 (20 overs)	v	Bangladesh; 132/8 (20 overs)
Brendon McCullum 123 (58); Abdur Razzaq 2/28 (4 overs)		Nasir Hossain 50 (39); Tim Southee 3/16 (4 overs)

New Zealand won by 59 runs
Pallekele International Cricket Stadium, Pallekele
Umpires: Marais Erasmus (SA) and Nigel Llong (Eng)
Player of the match: Brendon McCullum (New Zealand)

- Bangladesh won the toss and elected to field

23 September 2012
15:30 (D/N)
Scorecard

Pakistan; 177/6 (20 overs)	v	New Zealand; 164/9 (20 overs)
Nasir Jamshed 56 (35); Tim Southee 2/31 (4 overs)		Rob Nicol 33 (28); Saeed Ajmal 4/30 (4 overs)

Pakistan won by 13 runs
Pallekele International Cricket Stadium, Pallekele
Umpires: Marais Erasmus (SA) and Bruce Oxenford (Aus)
Player of the match: Nasir Jamshed (Pakistan)

- Pakistan won the toss and elected to bat

Super 8 (Group E)

27 September 2012
15:30 (D/N)
Scorecard

New Zealand; 174/7 (20 overs)	v	Sri Lanka; 174/6 (20 overs)
Rob Nicol 58 (30); Akila Dananjaya 2/32 (4 overs)		Tillakaratne Dilshan 76 (53); James Franklin 2/34 (4 overs)

Match tied; Sri Lanka won the Super Over
Pallekele International Cricket Stadium, Pallekele
Umpires: Aleem Dar (Pak) and Simon Taufel (Aus)
Player of the match: Tillakaratne Dilshan (SL)

- New Zealand won the toss and elected to bat
- Super Over: Sri Lanka 13/1, New Zealand 7/1

29 September 2012
15:30 (D/N)
Scorecard

New Zealand; 148/6 (20 overs)	v	England; 149/4 (18.5 overs)
James Franklin 50 (33); Steven Finn 3/16 (4 overs)		Luke Wright 76 (43); Daniel Vettori 1/20 (4 overs)

England won by 6 wickets
Pallekele International Cricket Stadium, Pallekele
Umpires: Asad Rauf (Pak) and Simon Taufel (Aus)
Player of the match: Luke Wright (Eng)

- New Zealand won the toss and elected to bat

1 October 2012
15:30 (D/N)
Scorecard

West Indies; 139 (19.3 overs)	v	New Zealand; 139/7 (20 overs)
Chris Gayle 30 (14); Tim Southee 3/21 (4 overs)		Ross Taylor 62* (40); Sunil Narine 3/20 (4 overs)

Match tied; West Indies won the Super Over
Pallekele International Cricket Stadium, Pallekele
Umpires: Aleem Dar (Pak) and Asad Rauf (Pak)
Player of the match: Sunil Narine (WI)

- New Zealand won the toss and elected to field
- New Zealand were eliminated as a result of this match

=== 2014 World Cup ===
Squad and kit

- Brendon McCullum (c)
- Corey Anderson
- Trent Boult
- Anton Devcich
- Martin Guptill
- Ronnie Hira
- Mitchell McClenaghan
- Nathan McCullum
- Kyle Mills
- Colin Munro
- Jimmy Neesham
- Luke Ronchi (wk)
- Tim Southee
- Ross Taylor
- Kane Williamson

2014 kit

Results

Super 10 (Group 1)					Semifinal	Final	Overall Result
Opposition Result	Opposition Result	Opposition Result	Opposition Result	Rank	Opposition Result	Opposition Result	Overall Result
England; Won by 9 runs (DLS)	South Africa; Lost by 2 runs	Netherlands; Won by 6 wickets	Sri Lanka; Lost by 59 runs	3	Did not advance		Super 10
Source: Cricinfo

Scorecards

Super 10 (Group 1)

22 March 2014
19:30 (D/N)
Scorecard

England; 172/6 (20 overs)	v	New Zealand; 52/1 (5.2 overs)
Moeen Ali 36 (23); Corey Anderson 2/32 (4 overs)		Kane Williamson 24* (17); Jade Dernbach 1/13 (2 overs)

New Zealand won by 9 runs (D/L method)
Zohur Ahmed Chowdhury Stadium, Chittagong
Umpires: Aleem Dar (Pak) and Paul Reiffel (Aus)
Player of the match: Corey Anderson (NZ)

- New Zealand won the toss and elected to field
- Rain stopped play after 5.2 overs during New Zealand's innings. Their par score was 43 runs according to the Duckworth-Lewis method.
- England captain Stuart Broad was fined 15% of his match fee for criticism of the umpire's decision to play during a thunderstorm.

24 March 2014
15:30
Scorecard

South Africa; 170/6 (20 overs)	v	New Zealand; 168/8 (20 overs)
JP Duminy 86* (43); Corey Anderson 2/28 (3 overs)		Ross Taylor 62 (37); Dale Steyn 4/17 (4 overs)

South Africa won by 2 runs
Zohur Ahmed Chowdhury Stadium, Chittagong
Umpires: Aleem Dar (Pak) and S. Ravi (Ind)
Player of the match: JP Duminy (SA)

- New Zealand won the toss and elected to field

29 March 2014
15:30
Scorecard

Netherlands; 151/4 (20 overs)	v	New Zealand; 152/4 (19 overs)
Peter Borren 49 (35); Nathan McCullum 1/20 (4 overs)		Brendon McCullum 65 (45); Timm van der Gugten 3/30 (4 overs)

New Zealand won by 6 wickets.
Zohur Ahmed Chowdhury Stadium, Chittagong
Umpires: Aleem Dar (Pak) and Bruce Oxenford (Aus)
Player of the match: Brendon McCullum (NZ)

- New Zealand won the toss and elected to field
- Brendon McCullum became the first batsman to reach 2000 runs in Twenty20 Internationals.

31 March 2014
19:30 (D/N)
Scorecard

Sri Lanka; 119 (19.2 overs)	v	New Zealand; 60 (15.3 overs)
Mahela Jayawardene 25 (32); Trent Boult 3/20 (4 overs)		Kane Williamson 42 (43); Rangana Herath 5/3 (3.3 overs)

Sri Lanka won by 59 runs
Zohur Ahmed Chowdhury Stadium, Chittagong
Umpires: Aleem Dar (Pak) and Rod Tucker (Aus)
Player of the match: Rangana Herath (SL)

- New Zealand won the toss and elected to field
- With this result New Zealand were eliminated.
- New Zealand 60 all out is the lowest score by a test playing nation in Twenty20 Internationals

=== 2016 World Cup ===
Squad and kit

- Kane Williamson (c)
- Tim Southee (vc)
- Corey Anderson
- Trent Boult
- Grant Elliott
- Martin Guptill
- Mitchell McClenaghan
- Nathan McCullum
- Adam Milne
- Colin Munro
- Henry Nicholls
- Luke Ronchi (wk)
- Mitchell Santner
- Ish Sodhi
- Ross Taylor

2016 kit

Results

Super 10 (Group 2)					Semifinal	Final	Overall Result
Opposition Result	Opposition Result	Opposition Result	Opposition Result	Rank	Opposition Result	Opposition Result	Overall Result
India; Won by 47 runs	Australia; Won by 8 runs	Pakistan; Won by 22 runs	Bangladesh; Won by 75 runs	1	England; Lost by 7 wickets	Did not advance	Semifinals
Source: Cricinfo

Scorecards

Super 10 (Group 2)

15 March 2016
19:30 (D/N)
Scorecard

New Zealand; 126/7 (20 overs)	v	India; 79 (18.1 overs)
Corey Anderson 34 (42); Jasprit Bumrah 1/15 (4 overs)		MS Dhoni 30 (30); Mitchell Santner 4/11 (4 overs)

New Zealand won by 47 runs
Vidarbha Cricket Association Stadium, Nagpur
Umpires: Kumar Dharmasena (SL) and Richard Illingworth (Eng)
Player of the match: Mitchell Santner (NZ)

- New Zealand won the toss and elected to bat.
- Mitchell Santner recorded the best figures for a New Zealand spin bowler in T20Is.

18 March 2016
15:00 (D/N)
Scorecard

New Zealand; 142/8 (20 overs)	v	Australia; 134/9 (20 overs)
Martin Guptill 39 (27); James Faulkner 2/18 (3 overs); Glenn Maxwell 2/18 (3 overs)		Usman Khawaja 38 (27); Mitchell McClenaghan 3/17 (3 overs)

New Zealand won by 8 runs
Himachal Pradesh Cricket Association Stadium, Dharamshala
Umpires: Marais Erasmus (SA) and Nigel Llong (Eng)
Player of the match: Mitchell McClenaghan (NZ)

- New Zealand won the toss and elected to bat.

22 March 2016
19:30 (D/N)
Scorecard

New Zealand; 180/5 (20 overs)	v	Pakistan; 158/5 (20 overs)
Martin Guptill 80 (48); Mohammad Sami 2/23 (4 overs)		Sharjeel Khan 47 (25); Adam Milne 2/25 (4 overs)

New Zealand won by 22 runs
Punjab Cricket Association IS Bindra Stadium, Mohali
Umpires: Richard Illingworth (Eng) and Nigel Llong (Eng)
Player of the match: Martin Guptill (NZ)

- New Zealand won the toss and elected to bat.
- New Zealand qualified for the semi-finals as a result of this match.

26 March 2016
15:00 (D/N)
Scorecard

New Zealand; 145/8 (20 overs)	v	Bangladesh; 70 (15.4 overs)
Kane Williamson 42 (32); Mustafizur Rahman 5/22 (4 overs)		Shuvagata Hom 16* (17); Grant Elliott 3/12 (4 overs)

New Zealand won by 75 runs
Eden Gardens, Kolkata
Umpires: Johan Cloete (SA) and Michael Gough (Eng)
Player of the match: Kane Williamson (NZ)

- New Zealand won the toss and elected to bat.
- Henry Nicholls (NZ) made his T20I debut.

Knockout stage

Semi-final 1
30 March 2016
19:00 (D/N)
Scorecard

New Zealand; 153/8 (20 overs)	v	England; 159/3 (17.1 overs)
Colin Munro 46 (32); Ben Stokes 3/26 (4 overs)		Jason Roy 78 (44); Ish Sodhi 2/42 (4 overs)

England won by 7 wickets
Feroz Shah Kotla, Delhi
Umpires: Kumar Dharmasena (SL) and Rod Tucker (Aus)
Player of the match: Jason Roy (Eng)

- England won the toss and elected to field.
- Martin Guptill and Kane Williamson (NZ) became the second pair to add 1,000 runs in a partnership in T20Is.

=== 2021 World Cup ===
Squad and kit

- Kane Williamson (c)
- Tim Southee (vc)
- Todd Astle
- Trent Boult
- Mark Chapman
- Lockie Ferguson
- Martin Guptill
- Kyle Jamieson
- Adam Milne
- Daryl Mitchell
- Jimmy Neesham
- Glenn Phillips
- Mitchell Santner
- Tim Seifert (wk)
- Ish Sodhi

2021 Home kit

2021 Away kit

Results

Super 12 (Group 2)						Semifinal	Final	Overall Result
Opposition Result	Opposition Result	Opposition Result	Opposition Result	Opposition Result	Rank	Opposition Result	Opposition Result	Overall Result
Pakistan; Lost by 5 wickets	India; Won by 8 wickets	Scotland; Won by 16 runs	Namibia; Won by 52 runs	Afghanistan; Won by 8 wickets	2	England; Won by 5 wickets	Australia; Lost by 8 wickets	Runners-up
Source: Cricinfo

Scorecards

Super 12 (Group 2)

26 October 2021
18:00 (N)
Scorecard

New Zealand; 134/8 (20 overs)	v	Pakistan; 135/5 (18.4 overs)
Daryl Mitchell 27 (20); Haris Rauf 4/22 (4 overs)		Mohammad Rizwan 33 (34); Ish Sodhi 2/28 (4 overs)

Pakistan won by 5 wickets
Sharjah Cricket Stadium, Sharjah
Umpires: Michael Gough and Richard Kettleborough (Eng)
Player of the match: Haris Rauf (Pak)

- Pakistan won the toss and elected to field.
- Tim Southee (NZ) took his 100th wicket in T20Is.

31 October 2021
18:00 (N)
Scorecard

India; 110/7 (20 overs)	v	New Zealand; 111/2 (14.3 overs)
Ravindra Jadeja 26* (19); Trent Boult 3/20 (4 overs)		Daryl Mitchell 49 (35); Jasprit Bumrah 2/19 (4 overs)

New Zealand won by 8 wickets
Dubai International Cricket Stadium, Dubai
Umpires: Marais Erasmus (SA) and Richard Kettleborough (Eng)
Player of the match: Ish Sodhi (NZ)

- New Zealand won the toss and elected to field.

3 November 2021
14:00
Scorecard

New Zealand; 172/5 (20 overs)	v	Scotland; 156/5 (20 overs)
Martin Guptill 93 (56); Safyaan Sharif 2/28 (4 overs)		Michael Leask 42* (20); Trent Boult 2/29 (4 overs)

New Zealand won by 16 runs
Dubai International Cricket Stadium, Dubai
Umpires: Marais Erasmus (SA) and Ahsan Raza (Pak)
Player of the match: Martin Guptill (NZ)

- Scotland won the toss and elected to field.
- Martin Guptill (NZ) became the second batter to score 3,000 runs in T20Is.

5 November 2021
14:00
Scorecard

New Zealand; 163/4 (20 overs)	v	Namibia; 111/7 (20 overs)
Glenn Phillips 39* (21); Bernard Scholtz 1/15 (3 overs)		Michael van Lingen 25 (25); Tim Southee 2/15 (4 overs)

New Zealand won by 52 runs
Sharjah Cricket Stadium, Sharjah
Umpires: Paul Reiffel (Aus) and Paul Wilson (Aus)
Player of the match: James Neesham (NZ)

- Namibia won the toss and elected to field.

7 November 2021
Scorecard

Afghanistan; 124/8 (20 overs)	v	New Zealand; 125/2 (18.1 overs)
Najibullah Zadran 73 (48); Trent Boult 3/17 (4 overs)		Kane Williamson 40* (42); Rashid Khan 1/27 (4 overs)

New Zealand won by 8 wickets
Sheikh Zayed Cricket Stadium, Abu Dhabi
Umpires: Kumar Dharmasena (SL) and Langton Rusere (Zim)
Player of the match: Trent Boult (NZ)

- Afghanistan won the toss and elected to bat.
- New Zealand qualified for the semi-finals as a result of this match, while India and Afghanistan are both eliminated.

Knockout stage

Semi-final 1
10 November 2021
18:00 (N)
Scorecard

England; 166/4 (20 overs)	v	New Zealand; 167/5 (19 overs)
Moeen Ali 51* (37); James Neesham 1/18 (2 overs)		Daryl Mitchell 72* (47); Liam Livingstone 2/22 (4 overs)

New Zealand won by 5 wickets
Sheikh Zayed Cricket Stadium, Abu Dhabi
Umpires: Kumar Dharmasena (SL) and Marais Erasmus (SA)
Player of the match: Daryl Mitchell (NZ)

- New Zealand won the toss and elected to field.

Final
14 November 2021
18:00 (N)
Scorecard

New Zealand; 172/4 (20 overs)	v	Australia; 173/2 (18.5 overs)
Kane Williamson 85 (48); Josh Hazlewood 3/16 (4 overs)		Mitchell Marsh 77* (50); Trent Boult 2/18 (4 overs)

Australia won by 8 wickets
Dubai International Cricket Stadium, Dubai
Umpires: Marais Erasmus (SA) and Richard Kettleborough (Eng)
Player of the match: Mitchell Marsh (Aus)

- Australia won the toss and elected to field.

=== 2022 World Cup ===
Squad and kit

- Kane Williamson (c)
- Finn Allen (wk)
- Trent Boult
- Michael Bracewell
- Mark Chapman
- Devon Conway (wk)
- Lockie Ferguson
- Martin Guptill
- Daryl Mitchell
- Jimmy Neesham
- Glenn Phillips (wk)
- Mitchell Santner
- Ish Sodhi
- Tim Southee
- Adam Milne

2022 kit

Results

Super 12 (Group 1)						Semifinal	Final	Overall Result
Opposition Result	Opposition Result	Opposition Result	Opposition Result	Opposition Result	Rank	Opposition Result	Opposition Result	Overall Result
Australia; Won by 89 runs	Afghanistan; Match abandoned	Sri Lanka; Won by 65 runs	England; Lost by 20 runs	Ireland; Won by 35 runs	1	Pakistan; Lost by 7 wickets	Did not advance	Semi-Finals
Source: Cricinfo

Scorecards

Super 12 (Group 1)

22 October 2022
18:00 (N)
Scorecard

New Zealand; 200/3 (20 overs)	v	Australia; 111 (17.1 overs)
Devon Conway 92* (58); Josh Hazlewood 2/41 (4 overs)		Glenn Maxwell 28 (20); Tim Southee 3/6 (2.1 overs)

New Zealand won by 89 runs
Sydney Cricket Ground, Sydney
Umpires: Kumar Dharmasena (SL) and Adrian Holdstock (SA)
Player of the match: Devon Conway (NZ)

- Australia won the toss and elected to field.

26 October 2022
19:00 (N)
Scorecard

Afghanistan	v	New Zealand

Match abandoned
Melbourne Cricket Ground, Melbourne
Umpires: Kumar Dharmasena (SL) and Paul Wilson (Aus)

- No toss.
- No play was possible due to rain.

29 October 2022
19:00 (N)
Scorecard

New Zealand; 167/7 (20 overs)	v	Sri Lanka; 102 (19.2 overs)
Glenn Phillips 104 (64); Kasun Rajitha 2/23 (4 overs)		Dasun Shanaka 35 (32); Trent Boult 4/13 (4 overs)

New Zealand won by 65 runs
Sydney Cricket Ground, Sydney
Umpires: Michael Gough (Eng) and Paul Wilson (Aus)
Player of the match: Glenn Phillips (NZ)

- New Zealand won the toss and elected to bat.

1 November 2022
18:00 (N)
Scorecard

England; 179/6 (20 overs)	v	New Zealand; 159/6 (20 overs)
Jos Buttler 73 (47); Lockie Ferguson 2/45 (4 overs)		Glenn Phillips 62 (36); Sam Curran 2/26 (4 overs)

England won by 20 runs
The Gabba, Brisbane
Umpires: Nitin Menon (Ind) and Langton Rusere (Zim)
Player of the match: Jos Buttler (Eng)

- England won the toss and elected to bat.

4 November 2022
14:30
Scorecard

New Zealand; 185/6 (20 overs)	v	Ireland; 150/9 (20 overs)
Kane Williamson 61 (35); Josh Little 3/22 (4 overs)		Paul Stirling 37 (27); Lockie Ferguson 3/22 (4 overs)

New Zealand won by 35 runs
Adelaide Oval, Adelaide
Umpires: Kumar Dharmasena (SL) and Richard Illingworth (Eng)
Player of the match: Kane Williamson (NZ)

- Ireland won the toss and elected to field.

=== 2024 World Cup ===
Squad and kit

- Kane Williamson (c)
- Finn Allen (wk)
- Trent Boult
- Michael Bracewell
- Mark Chapman
- Devon Conway (wk)
- Lockie Ferguson
- Matt Henry
- Daryl Mitchell
- James Neesham
- Glenn Phillips (wk)
- Rachin Ravindra
- Mitchell Santner
- Ish Sodhi
- Tim Southee

2024 kit

Results

Group stage (Group C)					Super 8		Semifinal	Final	Overall Result
Opposition Result	Opposition Result	Opposition Result	Opposition Result	Rank	Opposition Result	Rank	Opposition Result	Opposition Result	Overall Result
Afghanistan; Lost by 84 runs	West Indies; Lost by 13 runs	Uganda; Won by 9 wickets	Papua New Guinea; Won by 7 wickets	3	Did not advance				Group stage
Source: Cricinfo

Scorecards

Group stage (Group C)

7 June 2024
19:30 UTC−4 (N)
Scorecard

Afghanistan; 159/6 (20 overs)	v	New Zealand; 75 (15.2 overs)
Rahmanullah Gurbaz 80 (56); Trent Boult 2/22 (4 overs)		Glenn Phillips 18 (18); Fazalhaq Farooqi 4/17 (3.2 overs)

Afghanistan won by 84 runs
Providence Stadium, Guyana
Umpires: Kumar Dharmasena (SL) and Ahsan Raza (Pak)
Player of the match: Rahmanullah Gurbaz (Afg)

- New Zealand won the toss and elected to field.

12 June 2024
20:30 UTC−4 (N)
Scorecard

West Indies; 149/9 (20 overs)	v	New Zealand; 136/9 (20 overs)
Sherfane Rutherford 68* (39); Trent Boult 3/16 (4 overs)		Glenn Phillips 40 (33); Alzarri Joseph 4/19 (4 overs)

West Indies won by 13 runs
Brian Lara Cricket Academy, San Fernando
Umpires: Ahsan Raza (Pak) and Alex Wharf (Eng)
Player of the match: Sherfane Rutherford (WI)

- New Zealand won the toss and elected to field.

14 June 2024
20:30 UTC−4 (N)
Scorecard

Uganda; 40 (18.4 overs)	v	New Zealand; 41/1 (5.2 overs)
Kenneth Waiswa 11 (18); Tim Southee 3/4 (4 overs)		Devon Conway 22* (15); Riazat Ali Shah 1/10 (1 over)

New Zealand won by 9 wickets
Brian Lara Cricket Academy, San Fernando
Umpires: Richard Illingworth (Eng) and Paul Reiffel (Aus)
Player of the match: Tim Southee (NZ)

- New Zealand won the toss and elected to field.

17 June 2024
10:30 UTC−4
Scorecard

Papua New Guinea; 78 (19.4 overs)	v	New Zealand; 79/3 (12.2 overs)
Charles Amini 17 (25); Lockie Ferguson 3/0 (4 overs)		Devon Conway 35 (32); Kabua Morea 2/4 (2.2 overs)

New Zealand won by 7 wickets
Brian Lara Cricket Academy, San Fernando
Umpires: Paul Reiffel (Aus) and Langton Rusere (Zim)
Player of the match: Lockie Ferguson (NZ)

- New Zealand won the toss and elected to field.
- Trent Boult (NZ) played in his last T20I.
- Lockie Ferguson (NZ) became the second bowler to bowl four consecutive maiden overs in a T20I match.

=== 2026 World Cup ===
Squad and kit

- Mitchell Santner (c)
- Michael Bracewell
- Rachin Ravindra
- Kyle Jamieson
- Finn Allen (wk)
- Matt Henry
- Glenn Phillips
- Jacob Duffy
- Tim Seifert (wk)
- James Neesham
- Ish Sodhi
- Lockie Ferguson
- Daryl Mitchell
- Mark Chapman
- Devon Conway (wk)

Reserve Players:

- Ben Sears
- Note: Kyle Jamieson replaced Adam Milne.

2026 kit

Results

Group stage (Group D)					Super 8 (Group 2)				Semifinal	Final	Overall Result
Opposition Result	Opposition Result	Opposition Result	Opposition Result	Rank	Opposition Result	Opposition Result	Opposition Result	Rank	Opposition Result	Opposition Result	Overall Result
Afghanistan; Won by 5 wickets	United Arab Emirates; Won by 10 wickets	South Africa; Lost by 7 wickets	Canada; Won by 8 wickets	2	Pakistan; No result	Sri Lanka; Won by 61 runs	England; Lost by 4 wickets	2	South Africa; Won by 9 wickets	India; Lost by 96 runs	Runners-up
Source: Cricinfo

Scorecards

Group stage (Group D)

Match 4
8 February 2026
11:00 UTC+5:30
Scorecard

Afghanistan; 182/6 (20 overs)	v	New Zealand; 183/5 (17.5 overs)
Gulbadin Naib 63 (35); Lockie Ferguson 2/40 (4 overs)		Tim Seifert 65 (42); Mujeeb Ur Rahman 2/31 (4 overs)

New Zealand won by 5 wickets
M. A. Chidambaram Stadium, Chennai
Attendance: 24,991
Umpires: Langton Rusere (Zim) and Alex Wharf (Eng)
Player of the match: Tim Seifert (NZ)

- Afghanistan won the toss and elected to bat.
- Gulbadin Naib (Afg) scored his 1,000th run in T20Is.
- Tim Seifert (NZ) scored his 2,000th run in T20Is.
- This was New Zealand's highest run chase in the T20 World Cup.

Match 11
10 February 2026
15:00 UTC+5:30 (D/N)
Scorecard

United Arab Emirates; 173/6 (20 overs)	v	New Zealand; 175/0 (15.2 overs)
Muhammad Waseem 66* (45); Matt Henry 2/37 (4 overs)		Tim Seifert 89* (42)

New Zealand won by 10 wickets
M. A. Chidambaram Stadium, Chennai
Attendance: 19,623
Umpires: Paul Reiffel (Aus) and Roland Black (Ire)
Player of the match: Tim Seifert (NZ)

- United Arab Emirates won the toss and elected to bat.
- Muhammad Waseem and Alishan Sharafu's 107-run partnership is the highest for any wicket by the UAE in the T20 World Cup.
- This was the UAE's highest innings total in the T20 World Cup (173).
- Tim Seifert and Finn Allen (NZ) both hit their 100th six in T20Is.
- Tim Seifert and Finn Allen's 175-run partnership was the highest partnership ever in the T20 World Cup.
- This was New Zealand's fourth 10-wicket win in T20Is and the seventh overall in T20 World Cups.

Match 24
14 February 2026
19:00 UTC+5:30 (N)
Scorecard

New Zealand; 175/7 (20 overs)	v	South Africa; 178/3 (17.1 overs)
Mark Chapman 48 (26); Marco Jansen 4/40 (4 overs)		Aiden Markram 86* (44); Rachin Ravindra 1/9 (1 over)

South Africa won by 7 wickets
Narendra Modi Stadium, Ahmedabad
Attendance: 54,923
Umpires: Roland Black (Ire) and Paul Reiffel (Aus)
Player of the match: Marco Jansen (SA)

- South Africa won the toss and elected to field.
- Quinton de Kock (SA) became the first South African to score 3,000 runs in T20Is.
- Aiden Markram scored the fastest half-century (19 balls) for South Africa in the T20 World Cup and equalled with Rohit Sharma and Dasun Shanaka for the fastest half-century by a captain in the T20 World Cup.

Match 31
17 February 2026
11:00 UTC+5:30
Scorecard

Canada; 173/4 (20 overs)	v	New Zealand; 176/2 (15.1 overs)
Yuvraj Samra 110 (65); Jacob Duffy 1/25 (4 overs)		Glenn Phillips 76* (36); Saad Bin Zafar 1/29 (3 overs)

New Zealand won by 8 wickets
M. A. Chidambaram Stadium, Chennai
Umpires: Jayaraman Madanagopal (Ind) and Sharfuddoula (Ban)
Player of the match: Glenn Phillips (NZ)

- Canada won the toss and elected to bat.
- This was the first time Canada and New Zealand faced each other in T20Is.
- Yuvraj Samra and Dilpreet Bajwa's 116-run partnership is the highest for any wicket by Canada in the T20 World Cup.
- Yuvraj Samra became the first Canadian player, the first player from an Associate nation and the youngest player from any nation to score a century in a T20 World Cup. This was the second century in the 2026 tournament and 13th overall in the T20 World Cup history.
- New Zealand qualified for the Super 8 while Afghanistan, United Arab Emirates and Canada were eliminated as a result of this match.

Super 8 (Group 2)

Match 41
21 February 2026
19:00 UTC+5:30 (N)
Scorecard

Pakistan	v	New Zealand

No result
R. Premadasa Stadium, Colombo
Umpires: Paul Reiffel (Aus) and Rod Tucker (Aus)

- Pakistan won the toss and elected to bat.
- No play was possible due to rain.
- This was the 50th T20I game between New Zealand and Pakistan.
- Daryl Mitchell (NZ) played in his 100th T20I match.

Match 46
25 February 2026
19:00 UTC+5:30 (N)
Scorecard

New Zealand; 168/7 (20 overs)	v	Sri Lanka; 107/8 (20 overs)
Mitchell Santner 47 (26); Maheesh Theekshana 3/30 (4 overs)		Kamindu Mendis 31 (23); Rachin Ravindra 4/27 (4 overs)

New Zealand won by 61 runs
R. Premadasa Stadium, Colombo
Umpires: Allahudien Paleker (SA) and Asif Yaqoob (Pak)
Player of the match: Rachin Ravindra (NZ)

- Sri Lanka won the toss and elected to field.
- Mitchell Santner (NZ) scored his 1,000th run in T20Is. He also became the first cricketer from New Zealand to score 1000 runs and take 100 wickets in T20Is.
- Sri Lanka were eliminated as a result of this match.

Match 49
27 February 2026
19:00 UTC+5:30 (N)
Scorecard

New Zealand; 159/7 (20 overs)	v	England; 161/6 (19.3 overs)
Glenn Phillips 39 (28); Will Jacks 2/23 (4 overs)		Tom Banton 33 (24); Rachin Ravindra 3/19 (4 overs)

England won by 4 wickets
R. Premadasa Stadium, Colombo
Umpires: Adrian Holdstock (SA) and Ahsan Raza (Pak)
Player of the match: Will Jacks (Eng)

- New Zealand won the toss and elected to bat.
- Matt Henry (NZ) took his 50th wicket in T20Is.
- Will Jacks (Eng) equalled Shane Watson's 2012 record for the most player of the match awards by a player in a single edition of the T20 World Cup (4).

Knockout stage

Semi-final 1
4 March 2026
19:00 UTC+5:30 (N)
Scorecard

South Africa; 169/8 (20 overs)	v	New Zealand; 173/1 (12.5 overs)
Marco Jansen 55* (30); Cole McConchie 2/9 (1 over)		Finn Allen 100* (33); Kagiso Rabada 1/28 (3 overs)

New Zealand won by 9 wickets
Eden Gardens, Kolkata
Attendance: 33,533
Umpires: Richard Illingworth (Eng) and Alex Wharf (Eng)
Player of the match: Finn Allen (NZ)

- New Zealand won the toss and elected to field.
- Finn Allen broke Glenn Phillips's record for the fastest half-century by a New Zealand batter in the T20 World Cup.
- Finn Allen (NZ) scored the fastest century in the T20 World Cup and became the first player to score a century in T20 World Cup knockouts. This was the sixth century in the 2026 tournament and 17th overall in the T20 World Cup.
- New Zealand qualified for their second T20 World Cup final.

Final

8 March 2026
19:00 UTC+5:30 (N)
Scorecard

India; 255/5 (20 overs)	v	New Zealand; 159 (19 overs)
Sanju Samson 89 (46); James Neesham 3/46 (4 overs)		Tim Seifert 52 (26); Jasprit Bumrah 4/15 (4 overs)

India won by 96 runs
Narendra Modi Stadium, Ahmedabad
Attendance: 86,824
Umpires: Richard Illingworth (Eng) and Alex Wharf (Eng)
Player of the match: Jasprit Bumrah (Ind)

- New Zealand won the toss and elected to field.
- This was India's fourth T20 World Cup final; most for any nation.
- This was India's 15th appearance at the finals of ICC limited-overs tournaments; the most by any nation.
- India scored the highest-ever total (255) in the T20 World Cup finals, surpassing their own score of 176 in 2024.
- Sanju Samson (Ind) made the highest individual score in the Men's T20 World Cup finals.
- India became the first team to win three T20 World Cup titles. They also became the first team to win two consecutive titles, and the first host country to win the tournament.

== Records and statistics ==
=== Team records ===
Highest innings totals
Score	Opponent	Venue	Season
200/3 (20 overs)	Australia	Sydney	2022
198/5 (20 overs)	Ireland	Nottingham	2009
191/3 (20 overs)	Bangladesh	Pallekele	2012
190 (20 overs)	India	Johannesburg	2007
185/6 (20 overs)	Ireland	Adelaide	2022
Last updated: 8 March 2026

=== Most appearances ===
This list consists players with most number of matches at the T20 World Cup. Kane Williamson and Mitchell Santner jointly hold the record for most caps having played a total of 29 matches each. Williamson captained New Zealand in 21 World Cup matches, the most by any player for the team at the tournament.

Most matches
Matches	Player	Period
29	Mitchell Santner	2016–2026
29	Kane Williamson	2012–2024
28	Martin Guptill	2009–2021
28	Ross Taylor	2007–2016
25	Brendon McCullum	2007–2014
25	Glenn Phillips	2021–2026
25	Tim Southee	2010–2024
Last updated: 8 March 2026

=== Batting records ===
Most runs
Runs	Player	Mat	Inn	Avg	100s	50s	Period
727	Kane Williamson	29	27	31.60	—N/a	3	2012–2024
637	Brendon McCullum	25	25	28.95	1	2	2007–2014
617	Martin Guptill	28	27	24.68	—N/a	2	2009–2021
562	Ross Taylor	28	25	28.10	—N/a	3	2007–2016
545	Glenn Phillips	25	18	34.06	1	2	2021–2026
Last updated: 8 March 2026

Highest individual innings
Score	Player	Opponent	Venue	Year
123	Brendon McCullum	Bangladesh	Pallekele	2012
104	Glenn Phillips	Sri Lanka	Sydney	2022
100*	Finn Allen	South Africa	Kolkata	2026
93	Martin Guptill	Scotland	Dubai	2021
92*	Devon Conway	Australia	Sydney	2022
Last updated: 8 March 2026

Most 50+ scores
Fifties	Player	Period
4	Tim Seifert	2021–2026
3	Glenn Phillips	2021–2026
3	Brendon McCullum	2007–2014
3	Ross Taylor	2007–2016
3	Kane Williamson	2012–2024
2	Finn Allen	2022–2026
2	Daryl Mitchell	2021–2026
2	Martin Guptill	2009–2021
Last updated: 8 March 2026

List of hundreds
Score	Player	Opponent	Venue	Year
123	Brendon McCullum	Bangladesh	Pallekele	2012
104	Glenn Phillips	Sri Lanka	Sydney	2022
100*	Finn Allen	South Africa	Eden Gardens	2026
Last updated: 8 March 2026

=== Bowling records ===
Most wickets
Wickets	Player	Matches	Avg.	Econ.	4W	5W	Period
36	Tim Southee	25	17.91	6.99	0	0	2010–2024
34	Trent Boult	18	12.50	5.93	1	0	2014–2024
27	Mitchell Santner	29	24.18	6.41	1	0	2016–2026
27	Ish Sodhi	21	18.77	7.17	0	0	2016–2026
23	Nathan McCullum	22	17.34	5.94	0	0	2007–2016
Last updated: 8 March 2026

Best innings figures
Player	Bowling figures	Opponent	Venue	Year
Mark Gillespie	4/7 (2.5 overs)	Kenya	Durban	2007
Mitchell Santner	4/11 (4 overs)	India	Nagpur	2016
Trent Boult	4/13 (4 overs)	Sri Lanka	Sydney	2022
Daniel Vettori	4/20 (4 overs)	India	Johannesburg	2007
Rachin Ravindra	4/27 (4 overs)	Sri Lanka	Colombo (RPS)	2026
Last updated: 8 March 2026

=== Partnership records ===
Highest partnerships by runs
Runs	Players	Opposition	Venue	Season
175* (1st wicket)	Tim Seifert & Finn Allen	v United Arab Emirates	Chennai	2026
146* (3rd wicket)	Rachin Ravindra & Glenn Phillips	v Canada	Chennai	2026
117 (1st wicket)	Tim Seifert & Finn Allen	v South Africa	Eden Gardens	2026
105 (4th wicket)	Glenn Phillips & Martin Guptill	v Scotland	Dubai	2021
94 (2nd wicket)	Brendon McCullum & James Franklin	v Bangladesh	Pallekele	2012
Last updated: 8 March 2026

=== Wicket-keeping records ===
Most dismissals
Dismissals	Player	Matches	Cat.	St.	Period
16	Devon Conway	15	13	3	2021–2024
12	Luke Ronchi	9	7	5	2014–2016
7	Tim Seifert	11	5	2	2021–2026
7	Brendon McCullum	25	6	1	2007–2014
3	Gareth Hopkins	5	2	1	2010–2010
Last updated: 8 March 2026

=== Fielding records ===
Most catches
Catches	Player	Matches	Period
19	Martin Guptill	28	2009–2021
18	Glenn Phillips	25	2021–2026
17	Daryl Mitchell	24	2021–2026
16	Kane Williamson	29	2012–2024
14	Ross Taylor	28	2007–2016
Last updated: 8 March 2026
