= Gilleasbaig =

Male given name

- Gender: Masculine
- Language: Scottish Gaelic

Origin
- Meaning: "servant of the bishop"

Other names
- Anglicisations: Gillespie, Archibald
- See also: Gille Easbaig, Gilleasbuig

Gilleasbaig is a masculine given name in the Scottish Gaelic language. The traditional form of the name is Gilleasbuig. Another form of the name is Gille Easbaig. The names mean "servant of the bishop", with the second word (Easbaig) deriving from the Latin episcopus (the final syllable and the second vowel suffering elision, the consonants becoming voiced, and the s being metathesised), which also gave rise to English bishop (the initial e and final us suffering elision, initial p becoming voiced, and c being palatalized in Old English).

An early bearer of the name was the founder of Clan Campbell. An Anglicised form of the name is Gillespie; the name is also Anglicised as Archibald, which is etymologically unrelated, but was carried by the early Campbell Earls of Argyll, often in the form Archibald Gillespie Campbell.

== People with the name ==
Gilleasbaig

- Gilleasbaig of Menstrie, (fl.1260), the earliest member of Clan Campbell on record

Gilleasbuig

- Gilleasbuig Macmillan, a Scottish Church of Scotland minister.
