= James Gillespie =

James Gillespie may refer to:

- James Gillespie (North Carolina politician) (c. 1747–1805), American politician from North Carolina
- James Gillespie (minister) (1720–1791), Scottish minister and theologian
- James Gillespie (footballer) (1868–1932), Scottish footballer
- James Gillespie (philanthropist) (1726–1797), Scottish snuff and tobacco merchant
- James Gillespie (mariner), HM Excise officer and commander of the cutter Henry Dundas
- James J. Gillespie (1892–1959), American politician from Iowa
- James U. Gillespie (died 1981), American politician from Florida

== See also ==
- Jim Gillespie (disambiguation)
- James G. Birney (James Gillespie Birney), American abolitionist, politician, and Liberty Party nominee for President
- James G. Blaine (James Gillespie Blaine), American politician and United States Secretary of State
