= John Gillespie =

John Gillespie may refer to:

- John H. Gillespie, evolutionary biologist
- John Gillespie (auditor) (1832–1897), state auditor and commissioner in Nebraska
- Dizzy Gillespie (John Birks Gillespie, 1917–1993), jazz trumpeter
- Jimmy Gillespie (John Imrie Gillespie, 1879–1943), Scottish rugby union player
- John Ross Gillespie (born 1935), field hockey player and coach from New Zealand
- John Gillespie (baseball) (1900–1954), Major League Baseball pitcher
- John Gillespie (footballer, born 1870) (1870–1933), Scottish footballer for Queen's Park FC and Scotland
- John Gillespie (footballer, born 1873) (1873–?), Scottish footballer for Sunderland
- John Gillespie (moderator) (1834–1912), moderator of the General Assembly of the Church of Scotland in 1903/04
- John Hamilton Gillespie (1852–1923), Scottish-American soldier, land developer, businessman and politician
- John Gillespie (Wisconsin politician), member of the Wisconsin State Assembly
- John Gillespie (producer) of Hollywood North
- John Gillespie (Tennessee politician), member of the Tennessee House of Representatives
- John Wynn Gillespie (1901–1932), American botanist whose standard author abbreviation is Gillespie

== See also ==
- John Gillespie Magee Jr. (1922–1941), Anglo-American aviator and poet
