= Shankaracharya Temple =

Hindu temple in Srinagar, India

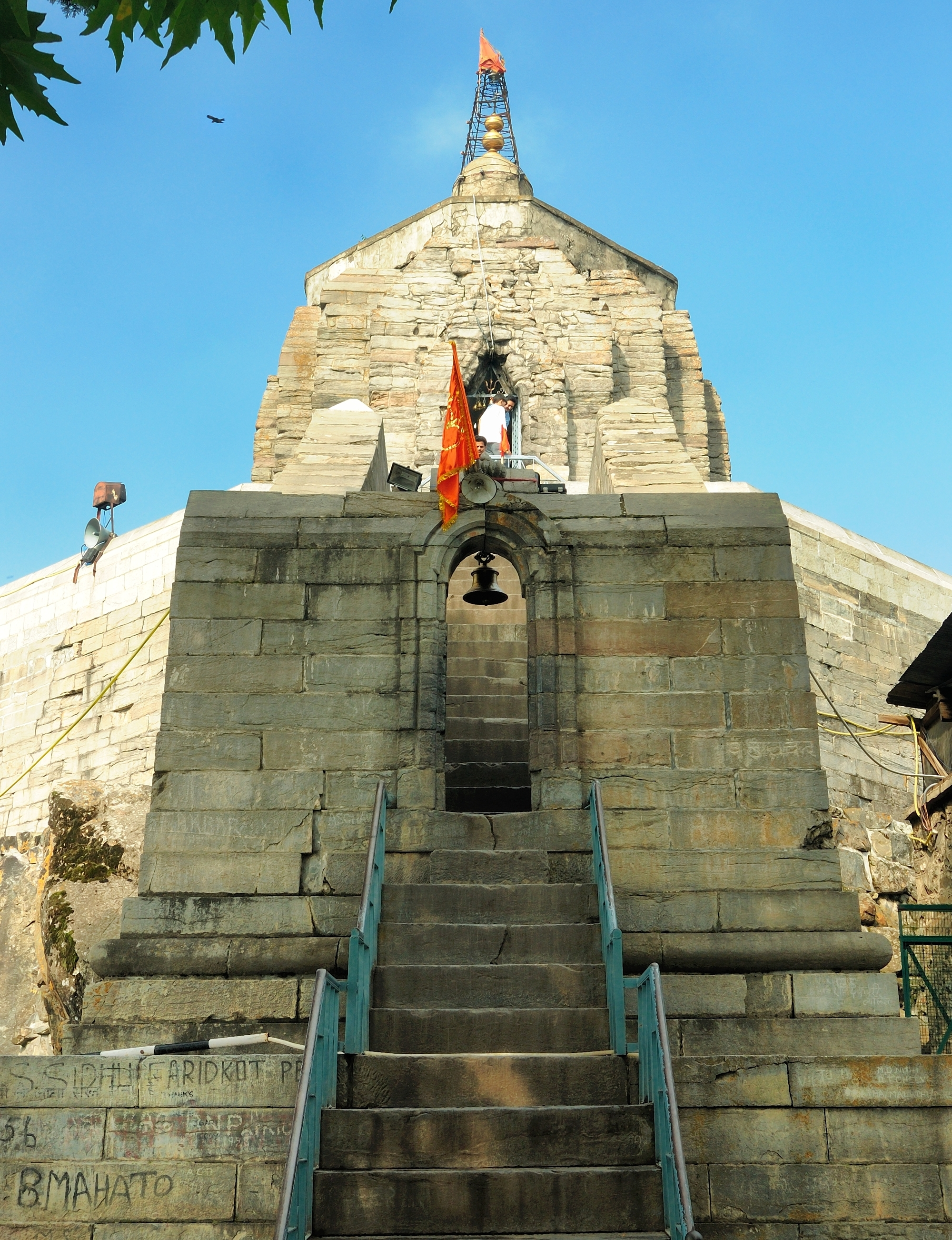
- The Shankaracharya temple in 2013

- Location in Jammu & Kashmir, India Shankaracharya Temple (India)

Religion
- Affiliation: Hinduism
- District: Srinagar
- Deity: Shiva

Location
- Location: Kothi Bagh, Durganag, Srinagar, Jammu & Kashmir, India
- Country: India
- Coordinates: 34°4′44″N 74°50′37″E

Architecture
- Elevation: 1,852.16 m (6,077 ft)

Shankaracharya Temple or Jyeshteshwara Temple is a Hindu temple situated on top of the Zabarwan Range in Srinagar in the Kashmir Valley of the union territory of Jammu and Kashmir, India. It is dedicated to Shiva. The temple is at a height of 1,000 feet (300 m) above the valley floor and overlooks the city of Srinagar. The temple is accessible via a road that emerges off Boulevard road near Gagribal.

On festivals such as Herath, as Maha Shivaratri is known as in the region, the temple is visited by Kashmiri Hindus.

The temple and adjacent land is a Monument of National Importance, centrally protected under the Archaeological Survey of India. Dharmarth Trust has managed the temple since the 19th century, along with others in the region. Karan Singh is the sole chairperson trustee.

== History ==
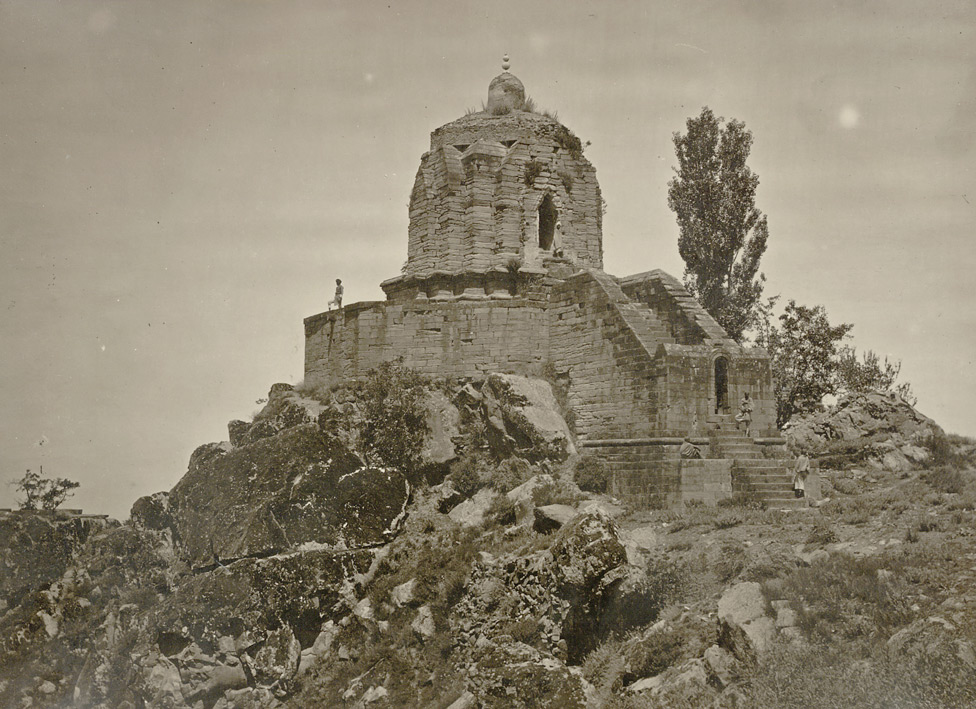
Figures present for scale

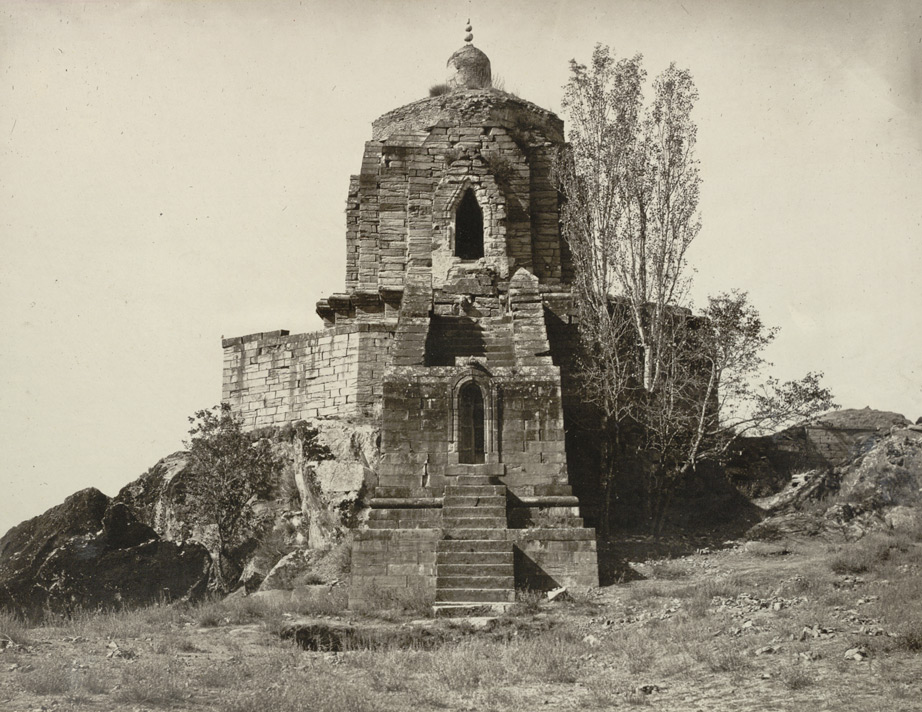
Photographed by John Burke 1868

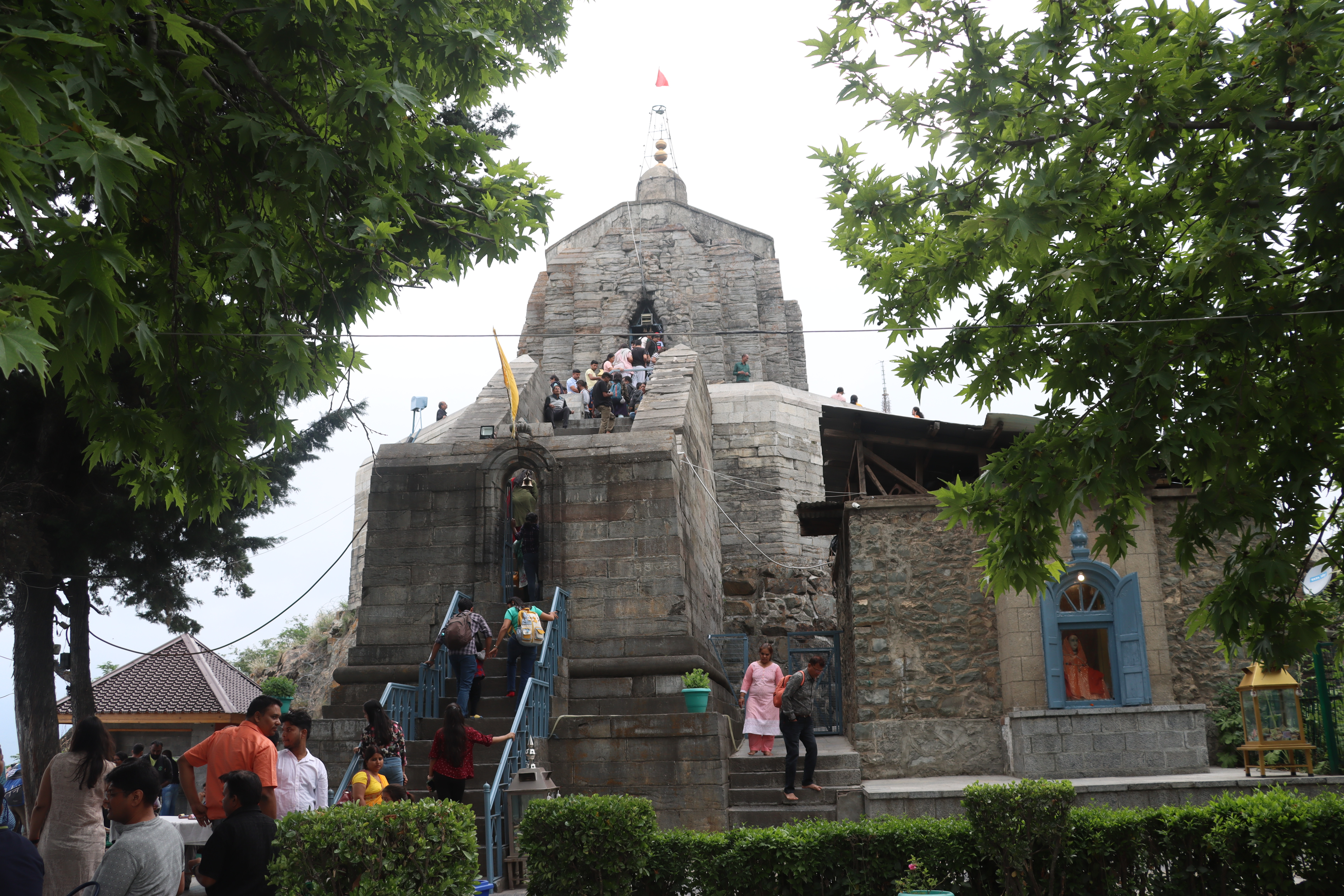
Present day during summer

The structure is considered as the oldest temple in Kashmir, historically and traditionally. It is situated on a hill that is a well preserved Panjal trap formed by volcanic activity during the Permian period. There is no consensus with regard to an exact date of construction.

The earliest historical reference to the hill comes from Kalhana. He called the mountain 'Gopadri' or 'Gopa Hill'. Kalhana says that King Gopaditya granted the land at the foot of the hill to the Brahmins that had come from the "Aryadesa". The land grant, an agraharam, was called 'Gopa Agraharas'. This area at the base is now called Gupkar. Kalhana mentions another village in the vicinity of the hill where King Gopaditya housed some of the Brahmins to a village (Note: Kalhana names this village as Bhuksiravatika (later Buch'vore, Buchwara)) next door in present-day Dalgate. Kalhana also mentions that King Gopaditya built the temple on the top of the hill as a shrine to Jyesthesvara (Shiva Jyestharuda) around 371 BCE.

The Alchon Hun king, Mihirakula is said to have been the founder of the temple, dedicated to Shiva, a shrine named Mihiresvara in Halada, and a large city called Mihirapura.

In 1899 James Fergusson placed the temple construction to the 17th to 18th century. Fergusson disputes claims that structures on the basis of which he makes this claim are from repairs. Aurel Stein while agreeing that the superstructures are from a more recent date, places the base and the stairs as much older. Historical figures associated with the monument include Jaloka, one of the sons of Ashoka (Gonandiya), according to the Rajatarangini.

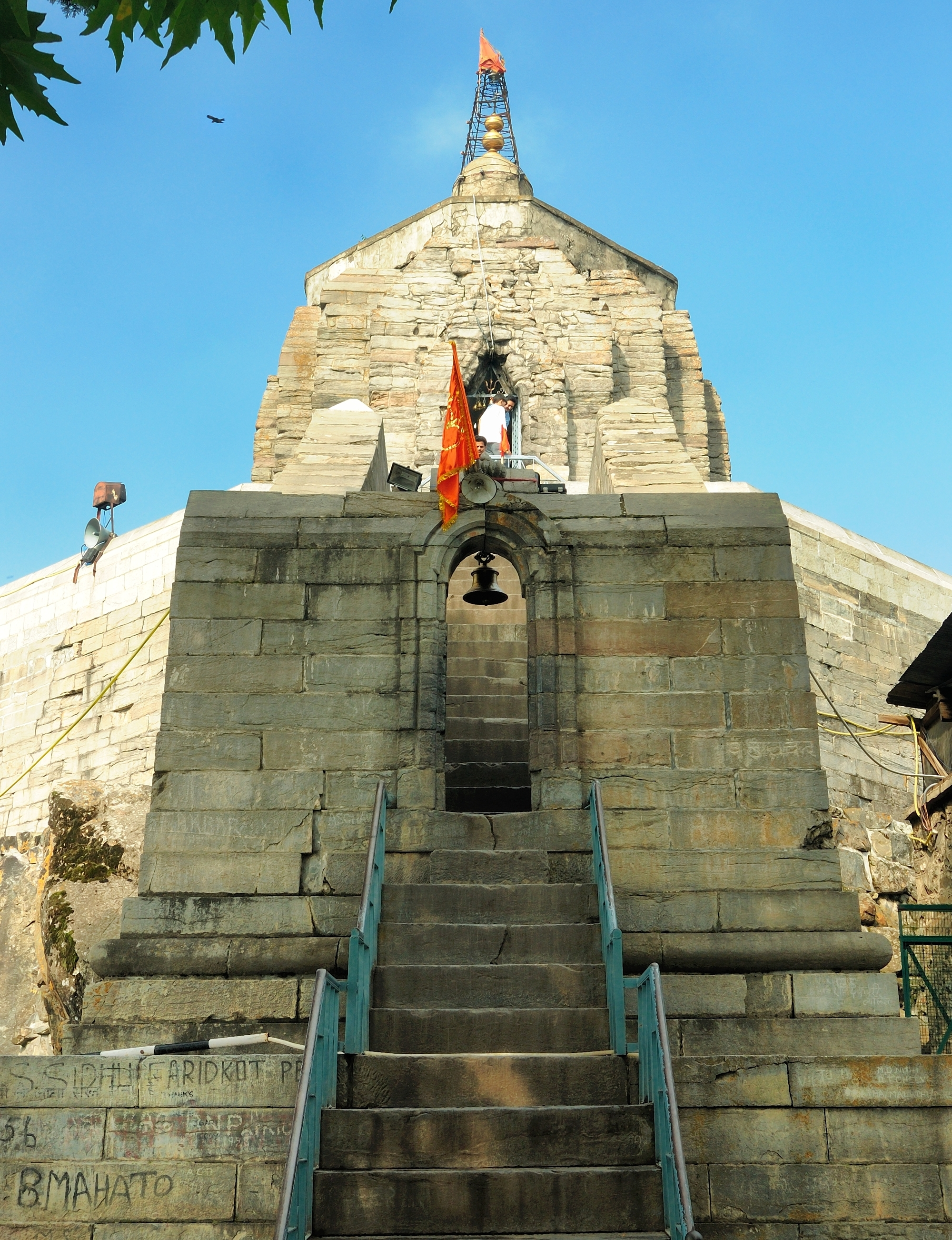
Front profile. (Graffiti on monuments is commonplace throughout India)

Kashmiri Hindus strongly believe the temple was visited by Adi Shankara and has ever since been associated with him; this is how the temple and hill got the name Shankaracharya. It is here that the literary work Saundarya Lahari was composed. It was composed by Adi Shankara after accepting the major faith in the region at the time, that of Shakti, and that the union of Shiva and Shakti, as in Shaktism, transpired into the symbolism of the Sri Yantra.

Hill
- Shankaracharya Hill, Sandhimana-parvata, Koh-e-Suleman, Takht-i-Sulaiman (Takht Hill), Gopadri (Gopa Hill)

Highest point
- Elevation: 1,880 m (6,170 ft)
- Prominence: 295 m (968 ft)
- Coordinates: 34.080°N 74.843°E

Dimensions
- Area: 1.4 km^{2} (0.54 mi^{2})

Geography
- Location: UT of Jammu and Kashmir
- Country: India
- Parent range: Zabarwan Range

Geology
- Rock age: Permian
- Rock type: Igneous

Names associated with the hill include Sandhimana-parvata, Koh-e-Suleman, Takht-i-Sulaiman or simply Takht Hill, Gopadri or Gopa Hill. The Dogra King Gulab Singh (1792–1857 CE) constructed the steps to the hill from Durga Naag temple (Note: Durga Nag temple, maintained by the J&K Shri Durga Nag Trust (JKSDNT), or simply the Durga Nag Trust.) side. Steps existed before as well, leading further, to the Jhelum. Nur Jahan used the stones of the steps in the construction of Pathar Mosque.

The Maharaja of Mysore came to Kashmir in 1925 and made the electrical search light installations at the temple, five around it and one on the top. The Maharaja left an endowment to fund the cost of electricity. In 1961 Shankaracharaya of Dwarkapeetham put the statue of Adi Shankaracharaya in the temple. Sri Aurobindo visited the temple area in 1903. Vinoba Bhave visited it in August 1959.

A 3.5 miles (5.6 km) road to the temple was constructed by Border Roads Organisation in 1969. While this was road construction was primarily to aid the setting up of a communications tower, and part of the road would be closed to the public, the road would also be used for those going to the temple. There are around 240 steps to reach the presiding deity. The Dharmarth Trust has built two small shelters here for sadhus. The hill has a large range of flora. There is very limited human activity on the hill other than religious tourism. From the top of the hill, Justine Hardy, a British writer, counted over 1350 boats on the Dal Lake. Jhelum is visible. The wide panorama covers major landmarks such as Dal Lake, Jhelum, and Hari Parbat.

View from/with Shankaracharya Hill

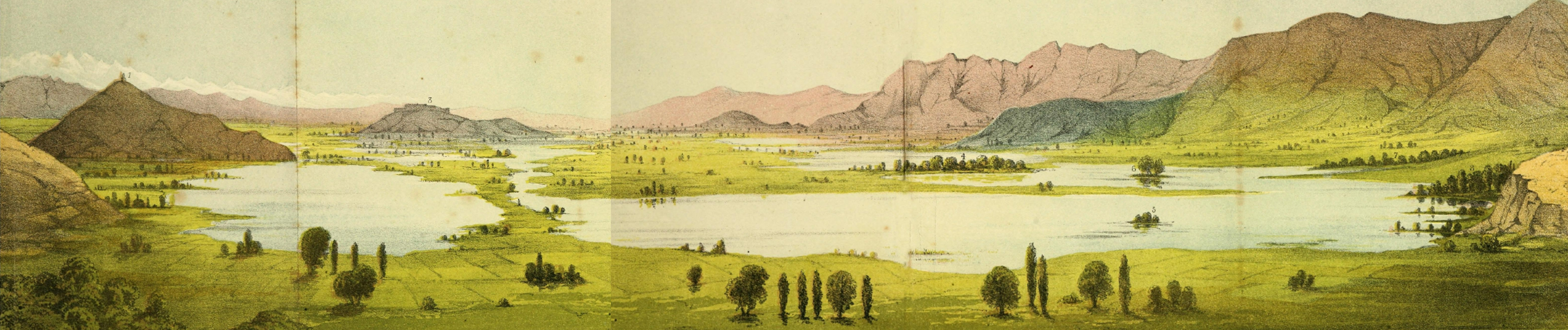
1862

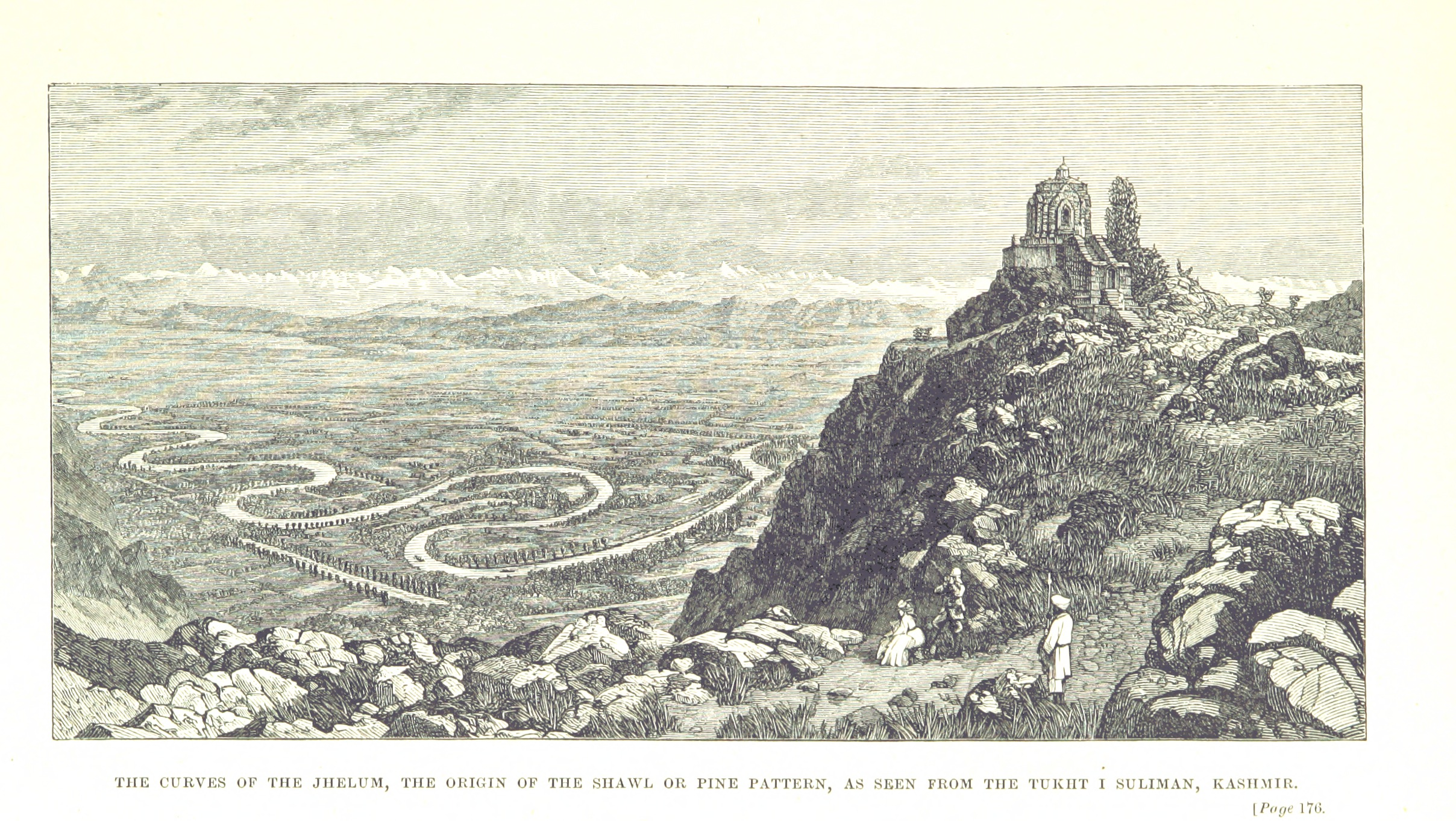
1874

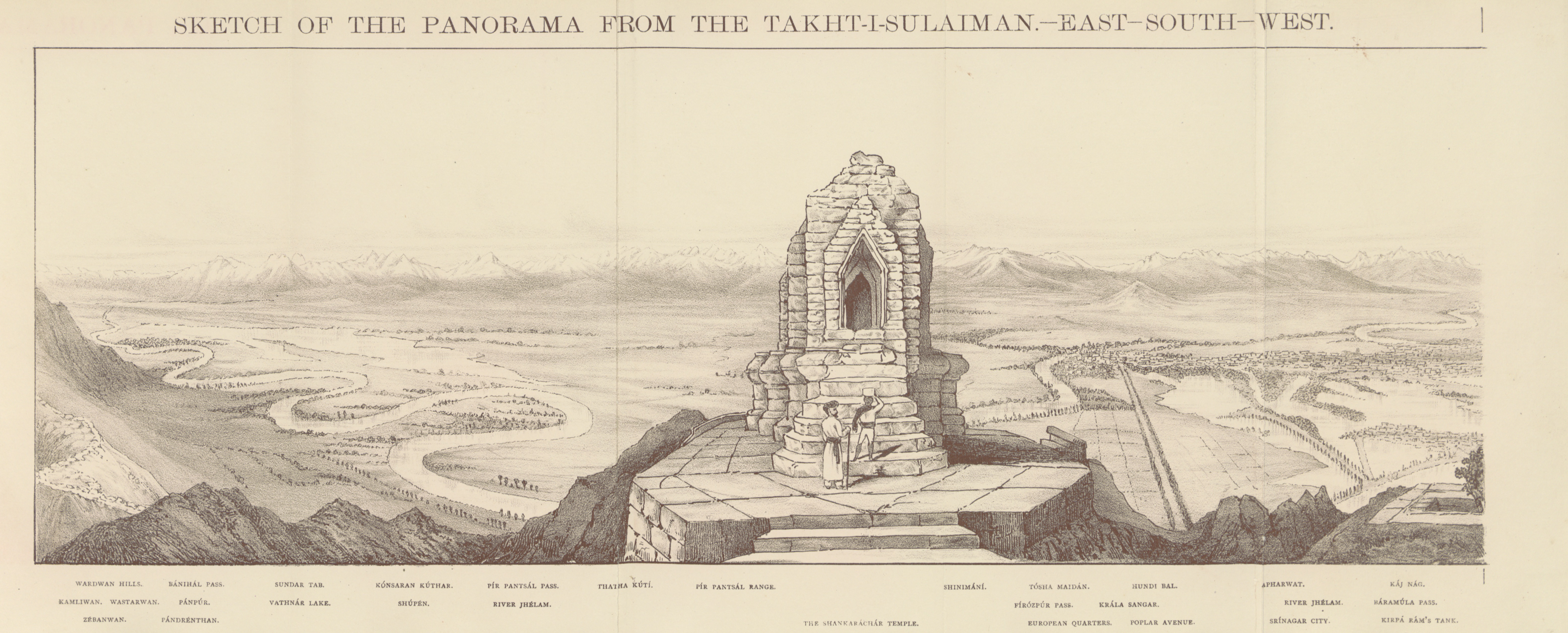
1887

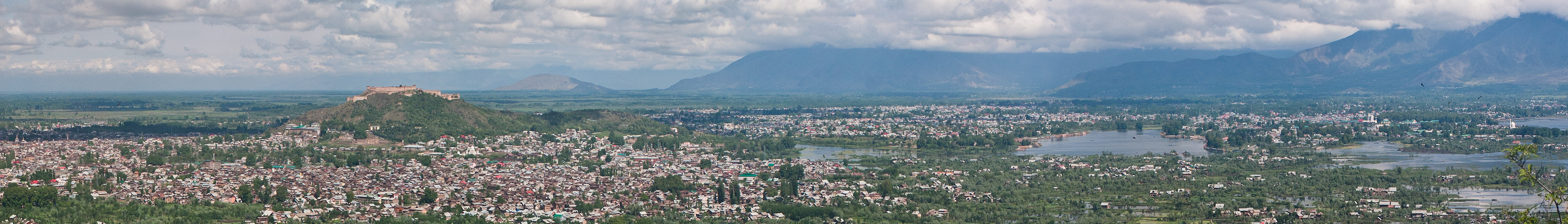
2010

== Architecture and design ==
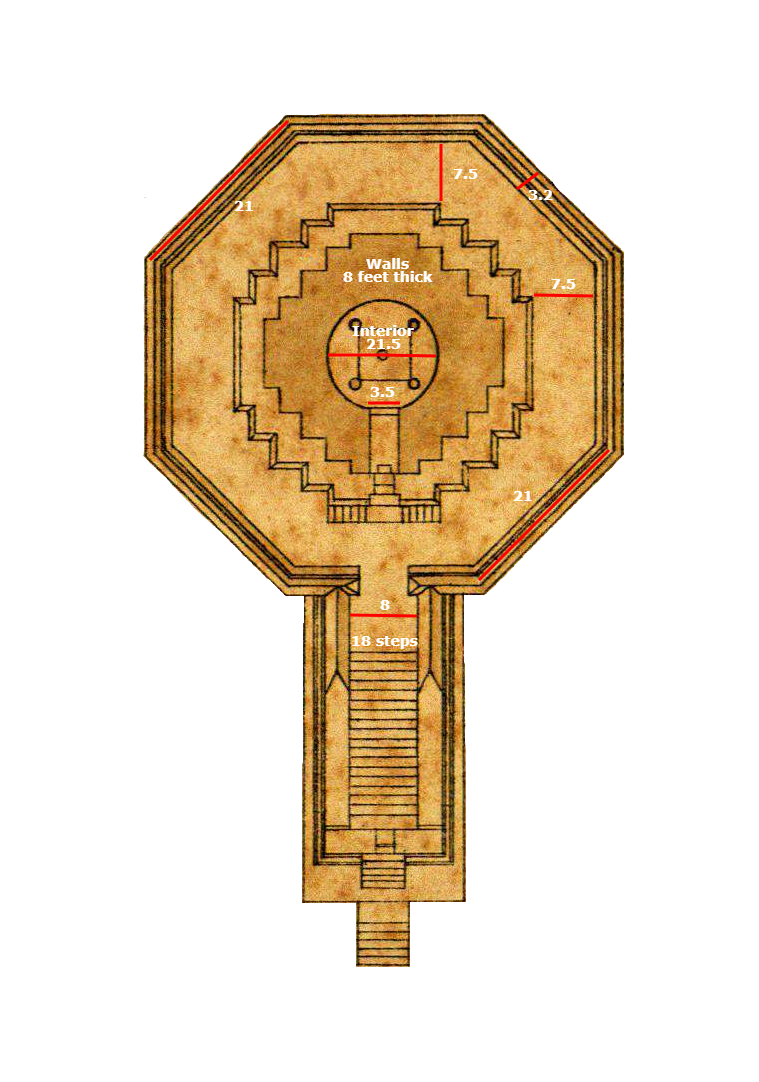
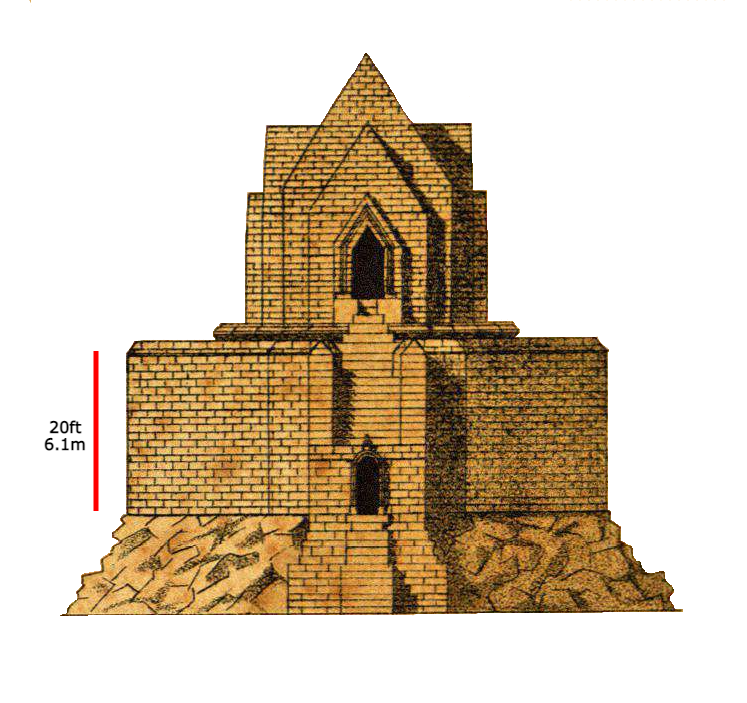
H. H. Cole's sketches of the temple (1869) annotated with Cunningham's dimensions (1848). The temple's width with enclosing wall is 60ft.

The temple rests on a solid rock. A 20 ft (6.1 m) tall octagonal base supports a square building on top. Each side of the octagon is 15 ft (4.6 m) feet. The front, back and flanks are plain while the other four sides have minimal design but noticeable angles. The center is made up of a circle 21.5 ft (6.6 m) in diameter with an entrance 3.5 ft (1.1 m) wide. The walls are 8 ft (2.4 m).

The terrace around the square temple is reached by a stone staircase enclosed between two walls. A doorway on the opposite side of the staircase leads to the interior, which is a small and dark chamber, circular in plan. The ceiling is supported by four octagonal columns, which surround a Basin containing a Lingam encircled by a snake.

== Current status ==
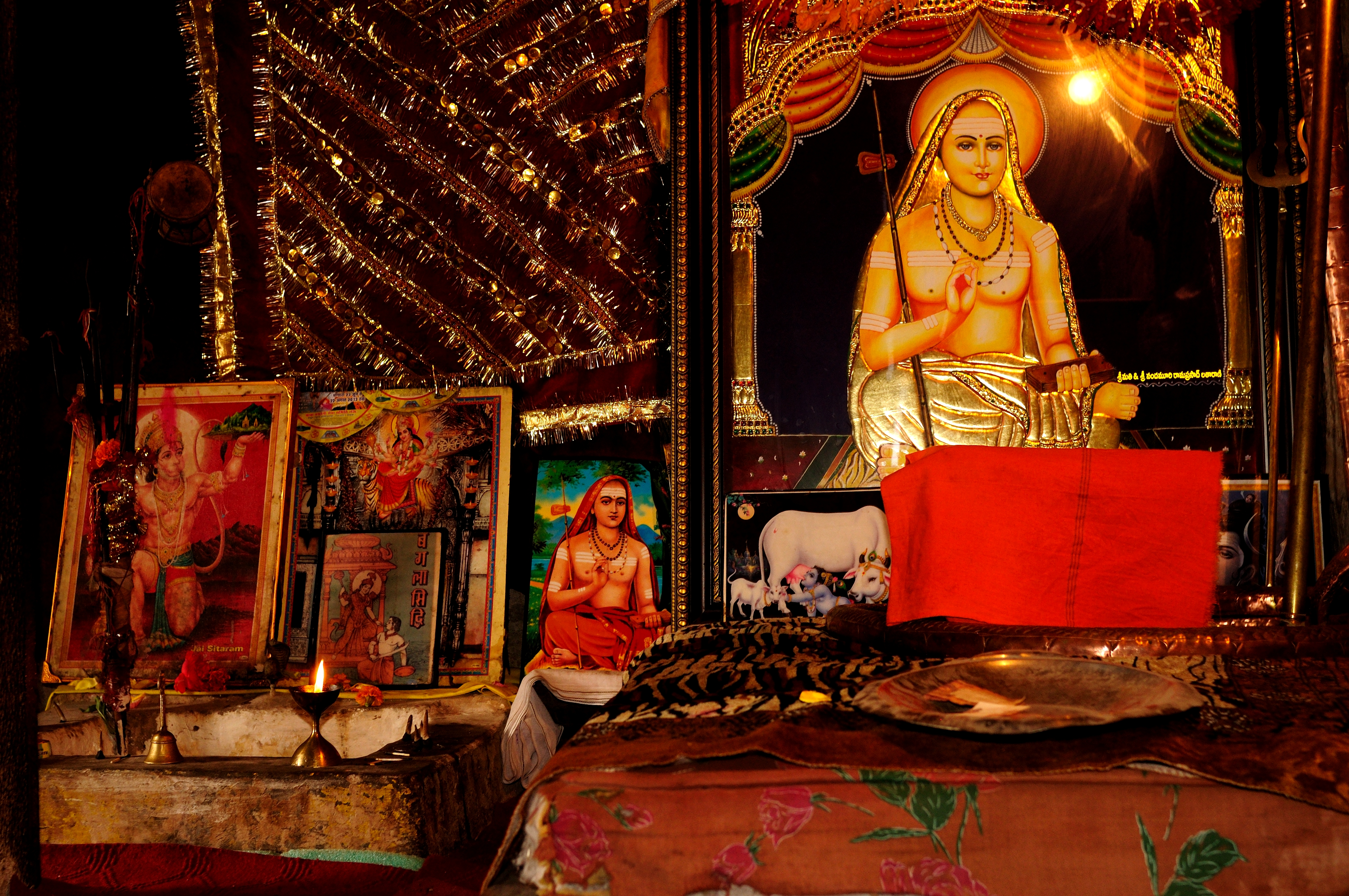
The memorial to the Adi Shankara inside the temple

The temple is used for regular worship and pilgrims visit the temple during the Amarnath Yatra. During the yatra, on the lunar phase of the new moon, the associated tradition of bringing Shiva's holy mace to the temple is carried out. The temple is part of the governments' tourist circuits. On occasions such as Maha Shivaratri, Herath, the temple is lit up. To ensure adequate preparations during festivals, as is the procedure with other religious and cultural centers in the city such as Hazratbal Shrine, the district administration reviews arrangements. The temple was one of hundred Archaeological Survey of India monuments lit up in 2021 to mark the administration of one billion COVID-19 vaccine doses in India.

== In popular culture ==
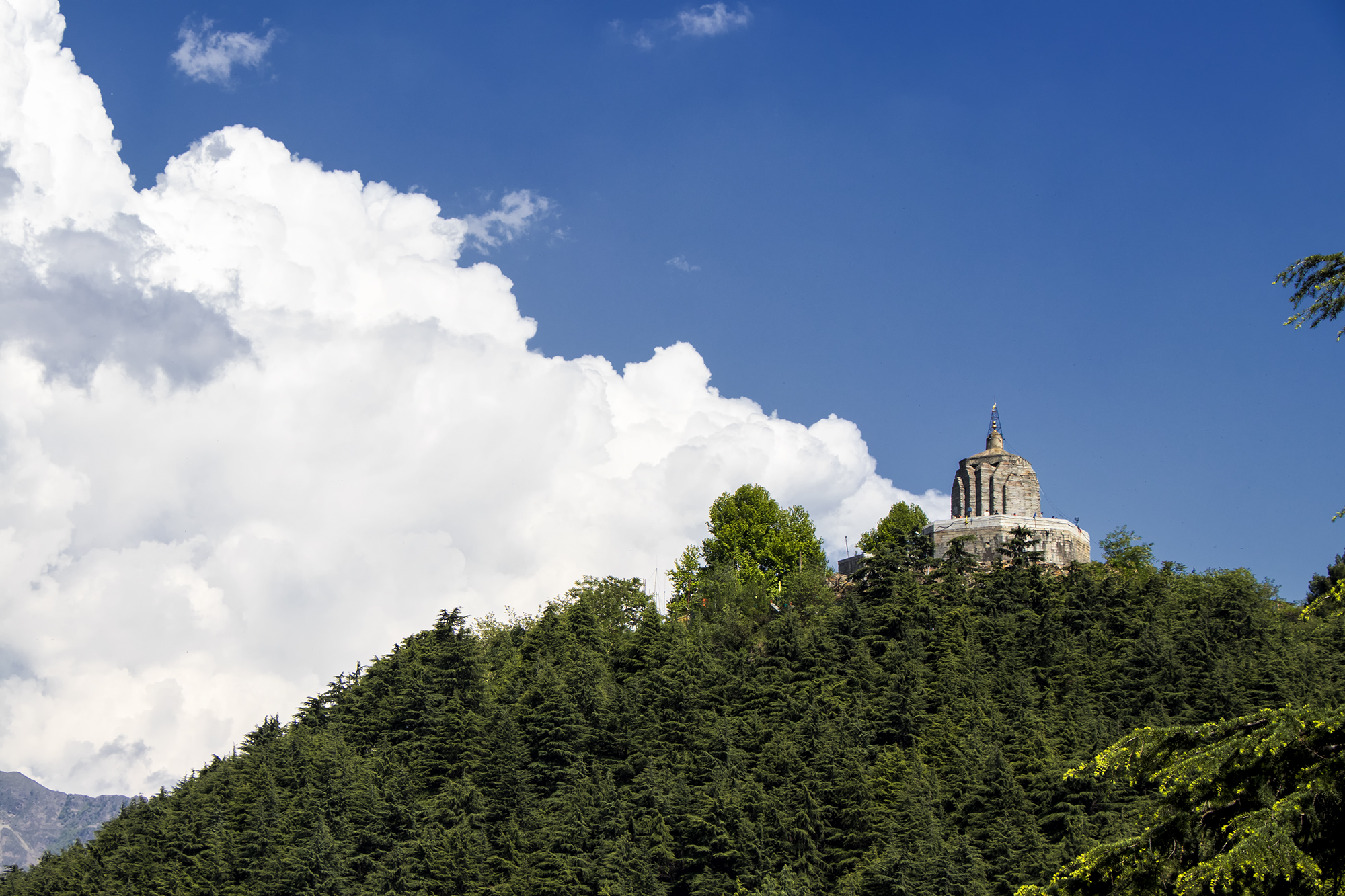
View of the temple

In 1948 Sheikh Abdullah wrote a letter to the Madras weekly Swatantra. Abdullah directed his message to south India at a time when India had sent someone from the south to defend its case in the United Nations, He wrote that Shankaracharya, someone from the south, came to Kashmir where his dialogue with a Kashmiri Hindu lady, in which he was outwitted, led to the development of Shaivism. Abdullah wrote that "a memorial to the great Shankaracharya in Kashmir stands prominent on the top of the Shankaracharya Hill in Srinagar" and that the temple contained an idol of Shiva.

The 2000 Bollywood films Mission Kashmir (Note: In Mission Kashmir, starring Hrithik Roshan, a plan is hatched to attack the temple along with another sacred site.) and Pukar (Note: In Pukar, which stars Anil Kapoor, opens with a militarised Shankracharya hill and a looming threat of an attack on the temple.) feature the temple. The temple also briefly features in the 1974 song Jai Jai Shiv Shankar. of Aap Ki Kasam (Note: The 1974 song Jai Jai Shiv Shankar features actors Rajesh Khanna and Mumtaz along with others including Sanjeev Kumar. The song is from the film Aap Ki Kasam and is sung by Lata Mangeshkar and Kishore Kumar. The actors are visiting the temple on Maha Shivaratri and are dancing supposedly under the influence of bhang which is traditionally associated with the festival. The Shiv Temple, Gulmarg is also featured in the song. The song has had an enduring legacy.)
