= Gillespie =

Gillespie may refer to:

- Gillespie (surname), including a list of people who share the name

== Places ==
=== United Kingdom ===
- Gillespie Road, a road in Highbury, London, England
- Gillespie Road, the former name of Arsenal tube station, Highbury, London, England
- Gillespie Park, London Borough of Islington
- James Gillespie's High School, Edinburgh, Scotland

=== United States ===
- Gillespie, Arizona
- Gillespie, Illinois
- Gillespie Township, Macoupin County, Illinois
- Gillespie, New Jersey
- Gillespie County, Texas
- Gillespie Field, a county-owned public-use airport near San Diego, California

=== Other places ===
- Gillespie Lake, a dried lake on planet Mars near Yellowknife Bay

== Other uses ==
- Gillespie algorithm, for solving stochastic equations
- Gillespie, Kidd & Coia, a Scottish architectural firm
- Gillespie syndrome, a rare genetic disorder
- Gillespie, a novel by the Scottish writer John MacDougall Hay
