= History of theology =

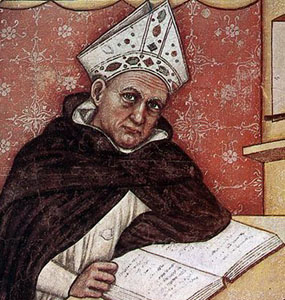
Albertus Magnus: German Dominican friar and saint (c. 1200 – 1280)

The history of theology has manifestations in many different cultures and religious traditions.

== Terminology and connotations ==
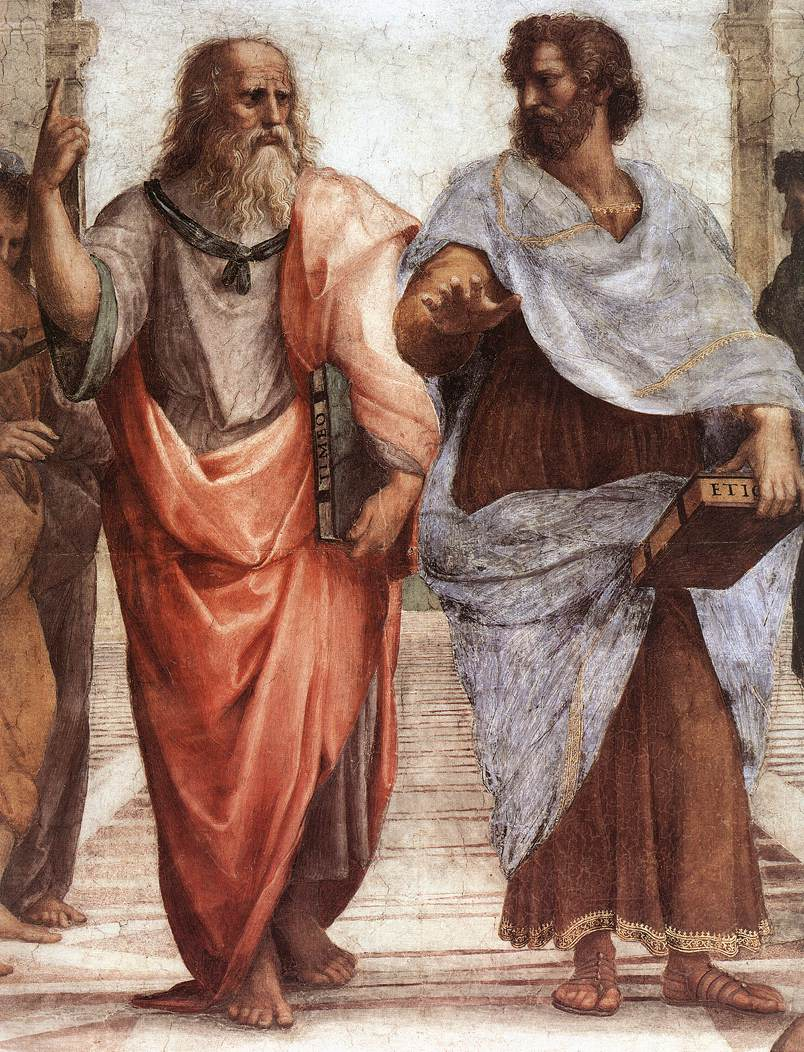
Plato (left) and Aristotle in Raphael's 1509 fresco The School of Athens

Plato used the Greek word theologia (θεολογία) with the meaning "discourse on god" around 380 BCE in Republic, Book ii, Ch. 18 (379a).

The Latin author Boethius, writing in the early 6th century, used theologia to denote a subdivision of philosophy as a subject of academic study, dealing with the motionless, incorporeal reality (as opposed to physica, which deals with corporeal, moving realities). Boethius's definition influenced medieval Latin usage.

It is in this last sense - theology as an academic discipline involving the basis of rational study of Christian teaching - that the term passed into English in the fourteenth century.

From the 17th century onwards, it also became possible to use the term "theology" to refer to study of religious ideas and teachings that are not specifically Christian (e.g., in the term natural theology which denoted theology based on reasoning from natural facts independent of specifically Christian revelation).

"Theology" can also now be used in a derived sense to mean "a system of theoretical principles; an (impractical or rigid) ideology".

== Theological development ==
=== Indian theology ===
The earliest theological reflections in Hinduism are found in the Rg Veda, the oldest sacred text. Here, an abstract Supreme Being is acknowledged as self-originating and the source of all phenomena. Vedic gods, including Indra, Varuna, and Vishnu, share common characteristics. They are said to have created the universe, set the sun in the sky, and propped apart heaven and earth. These gods are susceptible to human praise, and their personifications vary.

Hindu theology embraces panentheism, believing that the Supreme Soul (Parmatma) both transcends and pervades the universe. This underlying principle unifies the diverse pantheon of gods and goddesses. While Hinduism appears polytheistic due to its many deities, it is essentially monotheistic, recognising the unity of the divine.

The Bhakti movement (medieval period) emphasized intense devotion to a personal deity. Bhakti theologians like Ramanuja, Madhva, and Chaitanya advocated for loving surrender to God. Devotional texts, such as the Bhagavad Gita and the Ramayana, shaped theological thought by emphasizing devotion, ethics, and the pursuit of moksha (liberation).

Shankara, the founder of Advaita Vedanta, expounded non-dualism (advaita) by asserting that the individual soul (jivatman) is identical to the Supreme Soul (Brahman). This philosophical theology influenced Hindu thought, emphasizing self-realization and the illusory nature of the material world.

In contemporary Hinduism, theologians engage with issues like social justice, environmental ethics, and interfaith dialogue. Theological reflection continues to evolve, drawing from ancient texts, philosophical traditions, and the lived experiences of practitioners.

=== Christian theology ===
Christian theology, in scholastics of the Middle Age regarded as "the queen of sciences".

The 16th-century Protestant Reformation, in the spirit of Renaissance humanism, paid great attention to the study of biblical text, accompanied by outbursts of popular theology in personal religious fervor.

Recent Christian theological movements include Liberation theology, liberal theology, and fundamentalism.

=== Islamic theology ===
From the late 19th century onward, Islamic theology adapted to changing contexts. Scholars in Arab countries, Turkey, Iran, India, Central Asia, and Indonesia, explored diverse theological perspectives. Modern theologians grappled with issues like secularism, pluralism, and the compatibility of Islamic teachings with contemporary life.

== See also ==
- History of Catholic theology
- Outline of theology
