= Jim Gillespie =

Jim Gillespie may refer to:

- Jim Gillespie (baseball) (1894–1976), American baseball player
- Jim Gillespie (director), Scottish film director
- Jim Gillespie (footballer, born 1947) (1947–2016), Scottish footballer
- Jim Gillespie (footballer, born 1957) (born 1957), Scottish footballer

== See also ==
- James Gillespie (disambiguation)
