= Dharmarth Trust =

Religious trust in Jammu and Kashmir, India

Dharmarth Trust J&K
- Formation: 1846
- Founder: Maharaja Gulab Singh
- Founded at: Jammu
- Type: Private trust
- Origins: Dogra dynasty
- Chairperson trustee: Karan Singh
- Remarks: Active

Dharmarth Trust (also spelt Dharmartha) in Jammu and Kashmir was founded by Maharaja Gulab Singh in 1846 as an endowment for religious charity, and to manage and support Hinduism. In 1884, and under Maharaja Ranbir Singh, the Ain-i-Dharmath (in Persian) or 'The Regulations for the Dharmarth Trust' were formulated and a government department for religious affairs was created. The trust helped the Dogra dynasty to consolidate and validate its control over its territory and over the functioning of Hinduism in the region.

Karan Singh has been the sole chairperson trustee since 1959. In 2009 the trust had about 100 temples under its ambit, mainly in Jammu and Kashmir, but also in Himachal Pradesh, Uttarakhand and Uttar Pradesh. The Trust continues to be the guardians of major temples such as Shankaracharya Temple in Srinagar, Kheer Bhawani in Ganderbal and the Raghunath temple and Bawe Wali Mata shrine in Jammu.

== History ==
In 1826 Gulab Singh, a Dogra Hindu Rajput who had become the Raja of Jammu four years before, put aside funds which would be utilised towards religious charity. The practice of utilizing that money remained a private practice for two decades. In 1846 Gulab Singh donated five lakh rupee to Raghunath Temple.

Gulab Singh's son, Ranbir Singh, adapted the practice inherited from his father and placed it under a larger arrangement including the state machinery. Precedents for such a dharmarth department, a religious affairs department, included the darmarth under the Delhi sultans, Mughal emperors and the Maharajas of the Sikh Empire. The council of the trust was asked to oversee its functioning, including the running of institutions, prayer and meditation ceremonies, schools, and land and business associated with the trust. Any foreign religious person coming to the state was to be brought before the Maharaja, welcomed accordingly, and given parting gifts according to their status. Separate rules were prepared for all the different Gods and circulated accordingly. The trust would go on to include temples in Kashmir. Priests, including those on the furthest reaches of the Maharaja's territory, were to report occurrences to the state. The Ain-i-Dharmath (in Persian) was signed in 1884 by the issues of Ranbir Singh. As the trust passed into the hands of Maharaja Hari Singh, he opened the doors of all temples and shrines to a untouchables in 1932. Hari Singh passed on the trust to Karan Singh in January 1959.

Until 1987, Vaishno Devi Temple was under the care of the Dharmarth Trust. In 1987, during the governorship of Jagmohan, the temple was taken over by the state. The Trust continues to be guardians of major temples in the region– Shankaracharya Temple, Kheer Bhawani, Raghunath temple, Bawe Wali Mata shrine in Jammu. As part of the Smart Cities Mission in Jammu and Kashmir temples under the trust are being upgraded for devotees, pilgrims, and tourists.

== Bibliography ==
- Rai, Mridu (2004). Hindu Rulers, Muslim Subjects: Islam, Rights, and the History of Kashmir. London. Delhi.: Hurst. Permanent Black. ISBN 978-1-85065-701-9.
- Singh, Bawa Satinder (1974) [1966]. The Jammu Fox: A Biography of Maharaja Gulab Singh of Kashmir, 1792–1857. Carbondale and Edwardsville: Southern Illinois University Press. ISBN 0809306522.
