= Mike Gillespie =

Mike Gillespie may refer to:

- Mike Gillespie (baseball) (1940–2020), American baseball coach
- Mike Gillespie (basketball) (born 1951), American basketball coach

== See also ==
- Michael Allen Gillespie, American political science and philosophy professor
