= Kevin Gillespie =

Kevin Gillespie may refer to:

- Kevin Gillespie (academic), president of Saint Joseph's University and Jesuit priest
- Kevin Gillespie (chef) (born 1982), American chef
- Kevin Gillespie (monsignor) (born 1972/73), Irish priest
