= Buchwara =

Area in Dalgate locality of Srinagar in Jammu and Kashmir, India

Buchwara nestled in Srinagar's Dalgate locality, has transformed from a cultivation land to a bustling tourist hotspot, alluring visitors with its unique charm. At the heart of the summer capital, this area spans 2-3 km and has witnessed significant growth, now accommodating over 5,000 residents—a stark change from its sparse population fifty years ago. The presence of the world's only floating post office adds to Buchwara's allure. Positioned at the entrance of Boulevard/Dal Lake, it has evolved into one of the busiest streets in Srinagar, maintaining its reputation as one of the most beautiful areas while enchanting tourists with distinctive features and historical significance.

== History ==
Almost a century ago, Buchwara, once a dense jungle, underwent a remarkable transformation initiated by a visionary businessman from the Sarafkadal area, belonging to the Suhaff family. Maharaja Pratap Singh was the ruler at the time, and it was under his reign that the Suhaff family acquired the land, steering it away from its wild origins.

The pivotal development of the land was orchestrated by three brothers: Abdul Ahad Suhaff, Mohammad Sultan Suhaff, and Abdul Salam Suhaff. Among them, the eldest, Abdul Ahad Suhaff, played a crucial role in managing and inheriting the expansive property, following the family tradition where the eldest son takes on this responsibility.

Under Abdul Ahad Suhaff's guidance, the once-thick jungle transformed into flourishing orchids, featuring nuts, walnuts, apples, and various vegetation. This metamorphosis turned Buchwara into a habitable area, and people gradually settled in the upper regions as the expansive waters of Dal Lake reached the Buchwara Masjid.

Abdul Ahad Suhaff's commitment to the family legacy continued in his marriage to Sara Suhaff. However, in a departure from tradition, Abdul Ahad Suhaff chose not to follow the customary practice of bequeathing all ancestral property to the eldest son. Instead, respecting the wishes of his wife, he divided the property among all his children, including Gul Mohammad Suhaff, Gulam Mohammad Suhaff, Taut Bawan, Sara Gangoo, Nisar Mother Naqash Haja Suhaff, as well as two private individuals, whose names remain undisclosed.

Furthermore, Abdul Ahad Suhaff displayed generosity by selling or gifting a substantial portion, approximately 40-60%, of his property to a close friend. Over time, the once-prominent Suhaff family experienced a decline, with all its members passing away, except for the descendants of Gul Mohammad Suhaff. The legacy of Buchwara and the Suhaff family lives on through the generations descended from Gul Mohammad Suhaff. Among them, Ibtism Suhaff, a notable heir, continues to reside in Buchwara, preserving the rich history and transformations of the land initiated by her ancestors during the reign of Maharaja Pratap Singh.
