= Thomas Gillespie =

Thomas Gillespie may refer to:

- Thomas Gillespie (minister) (1708–1774), Scottish church leader
- Thomas Gillespie (North Carolina plantation owner) (1719–1797), plantation owner and Revolutionary War veteran
- Thomas Gillespie (Wisconsin politician) (1831–1914), member of the Wisconsin State Assembly
- Thomas Gillespie (rower) (1892–1914), Scottish rower
- Thomas Andrew Gillespie (1852–1926), American businessman known for T. A. Gillespie Company Shell Loading Plant explosion
- Thomas F. Gillespie (1838–1893), Irish-born merchant and political figure in Canada
- Thomas Haining Gillespie (1876–1967), Scottish zoologist and broadcaster
- Thomas Gillespie (geographer), American geographer and professor
- Thomas Gillespie (epidemiologist), American disease ecologist and conservation biologist
