= Michael Allen Gillespie =

American philosopher (born 1951)

- Born: Michael Allen Gillespie; January 24, 1951 (age 75)
- Education: University of Chicago (M.A., Ph.D.); Harvard University (A.B.)
- Scientific career
- Fields: Political science Philosophy
- Workplaces: Duke University; University of Chicago
- Thesis: Hegel, Heidegger and the Ontological Ground of History (1981)
- Doctoral advisor: Joseph Cropsey

Michael Allen Gillespie (born January 24, 1951) is an American philosopher and Professor of Political Science and Philosophy at Duke University. He completed his undergraduate work at Harvard University with an interdisciplinary major in philosophy and government. His graduate work was completed in Political Science at the University of Chicago. His areas of interest are political philosophy, continental philosophy, history of philosophy, and the origins of modernity. He has published on the relationship between theology and philosophy, medieval theology, liberalism, and a number of philosophers such as Nietzsche, Hegel, Heidegger, and Kant.

In his later works, Gillespie has specialized on the relationship between religion and politics. His books "Nihilism Before Nietzsche," "The Theological Origins of Modernity" and his article "The Antitrinitarian Origins of Liberalism" revealed the extent to which modern thought is indebted to Christianity, contributing to the breaking of the cliché that modernity is a decisive break from the Middle Ages. His former student is Darren Beattie.

== Works ==
- Nietzsche's Final Teaching, University of Chicago Press, 2017
- The Theological Origins of Modernity, University of Chicago Press, 2008.
- Nihilism before Nietzsche, University of Chicago Press, 1995
- Hegel, Heidegger and the Ground of History, University of Chicago Press, 1984
- Nietzsche's New Seas: Explorations in Philosophy, Aesthetics, and Politics (ed), University of Chicago Press, 1988
- Ratifying the Constitution (ed.), University Press of Kansas, 1989
- Homo Politics, Homo Economicus (ed.), Public Choice, special issue (2008)
- "Martin Heidegger's Aristotelian National Socialism," Political Theory 28, no. 2 (April 2000):140-66.
- "Where Did All the Evils Go," Moral Judgment and the Problem of Evil, ed. Ruth Grant (Chicago: University of Chicago Press, 2006), 15–34.
- "Players and Spectators: Sports and Ethical Training in the American University," in Debating Moral Education, ed. Elizabeth Kiss and Peter Euben (Durham, NC: Duke University Press, 2010), 296–316.
- "Sherlock Holmes, Crime and the Anxieties of Globalization," (with John Harpham), Critical Review 23, 4 (2011):449-74.
- "March Madness," The Point (February 2011), 124–31.
- "On Debt," 21st Century Studies (Bloomington: Indiana University Press, 2013), 56–71.
- "Nihilism After Nietzsche," Bollettino Filosofico 30 (2015):80-100.
- "Machiavelli's Modernity and the Christian Tradition," in The Modern Turn (Washington, DC: Catholic University Press, 2017), 106–28.

== Sources ==
- On Michael Allen Gillespie
- Michael Gillespie at Duke University Website
- Review of an article by Gillespie
