= James U. Gillespie =

American politician

- Gillespie in 1939

Member of the Florida House of Representatives from Volusia County
- In office 1939–1941

Personal details
- Died: June 20, 1981 (aged 89) New Smyrna Beach, Florida, U.S.
- Party: Democratic
- Children: Bill Gillespie

James U. Gillespie (died June 20, 1981), also known as J. U. Gillespie and John U. Gillespie, was an American politician. He served as a Democratic member of the Florida House of Representatives.

== Life and career ==
Gillespie was a civic leader.

Gillespie served in the Florida House of Representatives from 1939 to 1941.

Gillespie died on June 20, 1981, in New Smyrna Beach, Florida, at the age of 89.
