= Charles Gillespie =

New Zealand rugby union player and soldier

Charles Gillespie MC
- Born: Charles Theodore Gillespie; 24 June 1883 Masterton, New Zealand
- Died: 22 January 1964 (aged 80) Wellington, New Zealand
- Height: 1.85 m (6 ft 3/4 in)
- Weight: 89 kg (196 lb)

Rugby union career
- Position: Lock
Provincial / State sides
Years	Team	Apps	(Points)
1905, 1911–13	Wellington	24	
International career
Years	Team	Apps	(Points)
1913	New Zealand	1	(0)

Charles Theodore Gillespie MC (24 June 1883 – 22 January 1964) was a New Zealand rugby union player and soldier.

== Early life and family ==
Born in Masterton on 24 June 1883, Gillespie was the youngest son of English-born William Gillespie and his Scottish-born wife, Mary. On 28 February 1921, Gillespie married Edith May Meyers at St Peter's Church in Wellington.

== Rugby union ==
A lock, Gillespie represented Wellington at a provincial level. He played for his province in 1905, but did not make any further appearance for Wellington until 1911. He played just one match for the New Zealand national side, the All Blacks, a Test against the touring Australian side in 1913 at Carisbrook in Dunedin.

== Military service ==
Gillespie enlisted in the Royal New Zealand Artillery in April 1903. By November 1910 he had attained the rank of bombardier farrier and in November 1914 he was promoted to corporal farrier. Following the outbreak of World War I he became a part of the New Zealand Expeditionary Force, going overseas in October 1914. He saw active service at Gallipoli and, from April 1916, in France. In January 1916 he received a commission as a second lieutenant, and he was promoted to lieutenant in July 1917.

In July 1917, Gillespie was awarded the Military Cross. His citation read:

For conspicuous gallantry and devotion to duty in extinguishing burning boxes of ammunition under heavy hostile shell fire. Assisted by two of his men, he worked amidst the exploding shells with total disregard of danger, thereby saving a large amount of ammunition and averting a heavy explosion.

Gillespie was slightly wounded on 24 October 1917 at Passchendaele, but remained with his unit. From November 1917 to March 1918 he held the rank of temporary captain. From April to October 1918 his service was curtailed by illness, first bronchitis and then appendicitis. He returned to New Zealand in early 1919. Following the end of the war, Gillespie remained in the permanent military forces, and was confirmed with the rank of captain in January 1921. He served as adjutant of the 1st Field Brigade, Royal New Zealand Artillery for 12 years, and then as commanding officer of the Royal New Zealand Artillery, Northern Command. He retired with the rank of major after 35 years service in 1938. He was one of the oldest regular soldiers in New Zealand at the time, and one of the last two remaining foundation members of the Royal New Zealand Artillery.

== Death ==
Gillespie died in Wellington on 22 January 1964, and he was cremated at the Karori Crematorium. His war service was listed as a contributing factor in his death.
