= Norm Gillespie =

Australian soccer coach

Personal information
- Full name: Norm Gillespie

Managerial career
- Years: Team
- 1947: Australia

Norm Gillespie (fl. 1947) was an association football manager of the 1940s.

In 1947, he was coach of the Australian national team for three games, all against South Africa. The matches, which were part of a series of five, ended in two losses and a draw.

== Managerial statistics ==
Team	From	To	Record				
Team	From	To	G	W	D	L	Win %
Australia	1947	1947	3	0	1	2	0.00
