= Gillespie Park =

Nature reserve in Highbury, London, England

Coordinates: 51.559°N 0.106°W

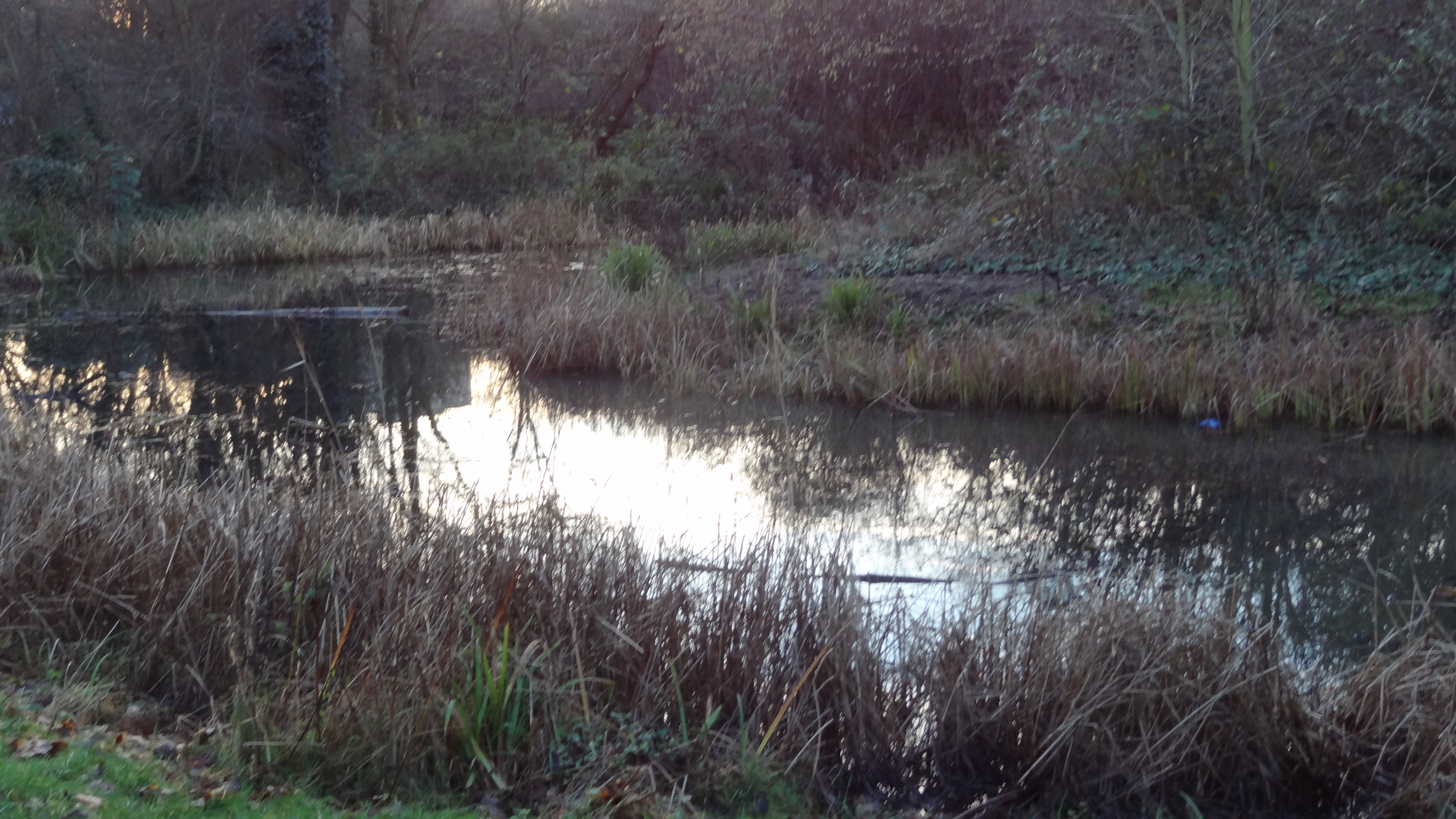
Main Pond

Gillespie Park is a 3.4 hectare Local Nature Reserve and Site of Metropolitan Importance for Nature Conservation in Highbury in the London Borough of Islington. It also hosts the Islington Ecology Centre, which provides environmental education for schools and organises walks and talks for adults. It is owned and managed by Islington Council. The site is protected by Fields in Trust through a legal "Deed of Dedication" safeguarding the future of the space as public recreation land for future generations to enjoy.

The site has meadow and woodland areas with several ponds including the main pond and reed bed, and also there are 244 species of plants, 94 of birds and 24 of butterflies. It has a number of plants which are rare in Central London, including the narrow-leaved bird's-foot-trefoil, grass vetchling and pyramidal orchid. In 1990 it was the site of the first recorded breeding of the long-tailed blue butterfly.

There is access from Drayton Park and Quill Street.
