= Robert Gillespie (disambiguation) =

Robert Gillespie (born 1933) is a French-born British actor.

Robert, Bob or Bobby Gillespie may also refer to:

- Robert Gillespie (preacher), 17th-century Scottish Presbyterian preacher
- Robert Rollo Gillespie (1766–1814), officer of the Irish Dragoons
- Robert Addison Gillespie (1815–1846), Texas Ranger; Gillespie County, Texas named for him
- Robert Gillespie (Scottish footballer) (1901–1960), Queen's Park FC and Scotland player
- Robert Pollock Gillespie (1903–1977), Scottish mathematician
- Robert G. Gillespie (1903–1983), Mississippi Supreme Court Justice
- Robert Gillespie (footballer, born 1904) (1904–1971), English soccer player
- Bob Gillespie (1919–2001), American baseball player
- Bobby Gillespie (born 1961), Scottish musician
- Robert Gillespie (American football) (born 1979), American NFL player
