= Bill Gillespie (politician) =

American politician and attorney

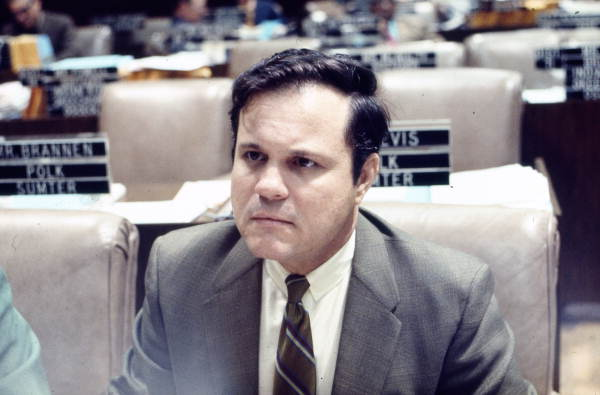

Member of the Florida House of Representatives
- In office 1966–1972

Member of the Florida Senate from the 10th district
- In office 1973–1974

Personal details
- Born: April 19, 1928 Daytona Beach, Florida
- Died: July 5, 2008 (aged 80) New Smyrna Beach, Florida
- Parent: James U. Gillespie (father)
- Occupation: attorney

William M. Gillespie (April 19, 1928 – July 5, 2008) was an American politician and attorney in the state of Florida.

Gillespie was born in Daytona Beach, Florida. He attended the University of Florida, Florida State University, and law school at Stetson University. He served in the Florida House of Representatives from 1966 to 1972 for district 10. He is a member of the Democratic Party. His father James U. Gillespie also served in the Florida House of Representatives from 1939 to 1941.
