= Bill Gillespie (footballer) =

Australian rules footballer

Personal information
- Full name: William Gillespie
- Born: 14 May 1887; Melbourne, Victoria
- Died: 11 September 1927 (aged 40); Heidelberg, Victoria
- Original team: Footscray (VFA)

Playing career^{1}
Years	Club	Games (Goals)
1908	Melbourne	1 (0)
- ^{1} Playing statistics correct to the end of 1908.

William Gillespie (14 May 1887 – 11 September 1927) was an Australian rules footballer who played with Melbourne in the Victorian Football League (VFL).
