= Mark Gillespie =

Mark Gillespie may refer to:

- Mark Gillespie (Scottish singer), Scottish singer and part of the British boyband Big Fun
- Mark Gillespie (Irish cricketer) (born 1969)
- Mark Gillespie (musician born 1970), English singer-songwriter
- Mark Gillespie (New Zealand cricketer) (born 1979), New Zealand cricketer
- Mark Gillespie (footballer) (born 1992), English footballer
- Mark Gillespie (Australian musician) (died 2021), Australian singer-songwriter
- Mark Gillespie (talent manager), British record producer
