= Ross Gillespie =

New Zealand field hockey player (1935–2023)

Ross Gillespie MBE
- Born: John Ross Gillespie; 2 June 1935; Timaru, New Zealand
- Died: 29 January 2023 (aged 87); Christchurch, New Zealand
- F Field hockey career
- Height: 1.75 m (5 ft 9 in)
- Weight: 68 kg (150 lb)
- Sport: Field hockey
National team
Years	Team	Caps	Goals
1956–1972	New Zealand		-
Coaching career
- Years: Team
- 1971–1976: New Zealand

John Ross Gillespie MBE (2 June 1935 – 29 January 2023) was a New Zealand field hockey player and coach. Gillespie represented New Zealand at the Summer Olympics twice as a player, in 1960 and 1964. He was head coach of the New Zealand field hockey team at 1972 Summer Olympics and of the gold medal-winning team four years later in 1976.

== Early life and family ==
Born in Timaru on 2 June 1935, Gillespie was the son of John Arthur Gillespie and Marjory Hannah Gillespie (née Kennard). He grew up in Christchurch, and was educated at Christchurch Boys' High School.

In 1957, Gillespie became engaged to Barbara Ellen Sutherland, and they later married and went on to have three children.

== Hockey career ==
=== Playing ===
A member of the Woolston club, Gillespie made his representative debut for Canterbury in 1955. He was first selected for the New Zealand national team in 1958, making his debut in the first test against Pakistan at Lancaster Park, Christchurch, on 12 April that year.

Gillespie went on to play for New Zealand at two Olympics: in 1960 when New Zealand placed fifth; and in 1964 when New Zealand finished in 13th place.

=== Coaching ===
As a teenager, Gillespie began coaching junior teams at the Woolston club, and eventually became coach of the club's senior side. In 1971, he co-coached, with Ray Mackinlay, the New Zealand men's team that finished second at the Southeast Asian regional tournament in Singapore. The following year, he was the sole head coach of the New Zealand side that placed ninth at the 1972 Summer Olympics (where he was listed as 17th man on the team sheet, but did not make an appearance on the field).

Gillespie was able to keep the core of the 1972 team together for the 1976 Summer Olympics, and the New Zealand team emerged victorious, defeating Australia in the final by one goal to nil to win the gold medal.

According to Barry Maister, Gillespie was not a loud, demonstrative coach. Of Gillespie, Arthur Parkin said: "At first meeting you think, he's a grumpy bastard, when actually he's very personable and very witty".

== Honours and awards ==
In the 1977 New Year Honours, Gillespie was appointed a Member of the Order of the British Empire, for services to hockey. In 1990, the 1976 gold-medal hockey team was inducted into the New Zealand Sports Hall of Fame. In 1998, Gillespie was elected a life member of Hockey New Zealand.

== Later life and death ==
Gillespie retired from international coaching after the 1976 Olympics, to concentrate on his sawmill business and his family, although he remained a national selector for a period. He died in Christchurch on 29 January 2023, at the age of 87, having been predeceased by his wife, Barbara, in 2017.
