= Bill Gillespie (journalist) =

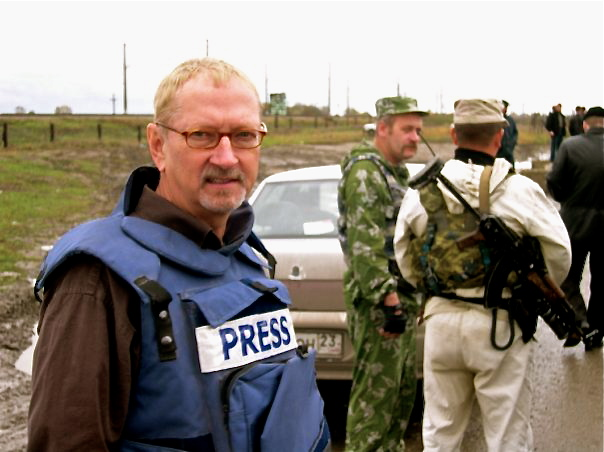
- Gillespie in Chechnya in 2004
- Born: William Earle Gillespie; March 10, 1946 (age 80); Melfort, Saskatchewan, Canada
- Occupation: Journalist
- Years active: 1970–present
- Employer: Various

Bill Gillespie (born March 10, 1946) is a Canadian journalist and author. He was security correspondent for CBC News and a former bureau chief of CBC Radio's Moscow bureau. As a foreign correspondent, Gillespie reported extensively from Afghanistan, Iraq, Chechnya and the Russian Caucuses, relaying information on the fall of the Taliban, the dismantling of Saddam Hussein's statue in Baghdad's central square, and the deadly siege of Beslan School Number One.

== Early life ==
Born in Melfort, Saskatchewan, Gillespie attained a master's degree in labour history from Memorial University of Newfoundland. While at Memorial, he was the editor of the student newspaper The Muse.

== Career ==
=== CBC ===
Gillespie spent the first 12 years of his CBC career in St. John's, Newfoundland, reporting for both radio and television. In 1989, he joined CBC's Parliamentary Bureau as a reporter, producer and occasional host of the national CBC Radio News weekly political affairs show, The House. Gillespie then spent the next five years in Toronto as a national radio reporter for CBC Radio, where he covered the rise of the Harris government, environmental issues and the Krever Inquiry into tainted blood. During this period, Gillespie won several awards for his coverage of the environment and homelessness.

Between 2005 and his retirement from the CBC in 2011, Gillespie was the CBC's Security Correspondent. He reported extensively on Canada's intelligence agencies, the Air India Inquiry, the Toronto 18 and Canadian Omar Khadr, and Guantanamo Bay. During this time, Gillespie also contributed various stories to the NPR radio syndicator and the C-SPAN television network.

In 2011, he was accused of defaming Canadian Jewish group the Jewish Defence League of Canada (JDL) after describing them as terrorists on-air. Later, he and CBC editor Esther Enkin apologised and clarified that Gillespie was quoting the Canadian government.

Recently, Gillespie spoke on behalf of the Canadian Media Guild in Ottawa, in an effort to highlight the importance of journalistic freedom from government interference, opposing plans to allow government involvement in negotiating contracts between the CBC and its employees.

=== Foreign correspondent ===
Gillespie's career as a foreign correspondent was launched with a posting to Moscow in 2001. Since September 11, 2001, he reported extensively from Afghanistan. He was in Afghanistan when the first American bombs began to fall, and he followed the Northern Alliance army as it removed the Taliban from power. Gillespie also conducted the first interviews with Canadian soldiers returning from combat.

In Moscow, Gillespie reported on Russia's struggle to shed its Soviet past and become a European-style democracy. Central to these stories was Vladimir Putin and the Putin-inspired transformation of Russian - U.S. relations. Other stories chronicled Putin's less successful attempts to change the Russian bureaucracy's Soviet mind-set.

=== Labour Activist and Film Maker ===
Since leaving the CBC Gillespie has begun a new career as a labour activist. He is currently coordinating a campaign by a coalition of labour and public interest groups known as the Trade Justice Network, aimed at generating more media coverage of the possible negative consequences of Trans Pacific Partnership free trade pact now under negotiation.

In 2013, Gillespie wrote, produced and narrated the influential short documentary "Made in the USA", which investigated the potential impact of Ontario PC leader Tim Hudak's policy proposal to introduce American style, anti-union right-to-work laws to Canada. Labour leaders in Ontario have credited the film for playing a significant role in convincing Mr. Hudak to suddenly reverse himself and drop the policy. As a result of the film Mr. Gillespie was awarded the 2013 Min Sook Lee Award for Labour Activists by the Mayworks Festival. In May 2014, "Made in the USA" was screened at the Workers Unite! film festival in New York. Gillespie followed "Made in the USA" with a sequel released in May 2014, called "Hudak's Plan B", an exploration of how Wisconsin governor Scott Walker neutered the state's public sector unions without a right-to-work law. In June, 2014 Gillespie followed with Epic Fail: A Short History of Privatization in Ontario documenting 20 years of failed government privatizations from the deadly Walkerton Water catastrophe to the contracting out of snow clearing and hospital construction to private companies.

Gillespie was also a consulting producer and writer on the documentary Change Your Name Ousama!, which explored how 9/11 impacted Canadian Muslims.

=== Author ===
Gillespie is the author of a book entitled, A Class Act: An Illustrated History of the Labour Movement in Newfoundland and Labrador. Gillespie is currently working on new edition of "A Class Act". The new release will coincide with the Newfoundland and Labrador Federation of Labour's 80th anniversary in 2016.

== Awards ==
Gillespie has won several awards over the course of his career. Among them, the New York Festivals Award, an Amnesty International Award and a National Science Award. In 2011, Gillespie and colleagues were nominated for the Canadian Association of Journalists 2010 award, for the story "Pakistan International Airline Threat", which aired on CBC News' The National.

== Family ==
Gillespie's son Alex Gillespie was killed by a Toronto Transit Commission bus in 2010. Gillespie and Kathryn Wright and Alex's siblings filed a $2m lawsuit against the TTC and Toronto Police Service.
