= List of Canterbury representative cricketers =

List of cricketers

This is a list of all cricketers who have played first-class, list A or Twenty20 cricket for Canterbury men's cricket team. Seasons given are the first and last seasons the player played for the team. Players did not necessarily play for Canterbury in all of the intervening seasons.

As of 31 October 2025

== A ==
- Denis Aberhart, 1983/84
- Joel Abraham, 2011/12
- Alfred Ackroyd, 1907/08
- Alwin Addison, 1909/10
- Aftab Habib, 1997/98
- Gren Alabaster, 1957/58–1959/60
- John Alderson, 1949/50–1950/51
- Charles Aldridge, 1973/74
- Robert Alexander, 1933/34
- Herbert Alington, 1868/69–1869/70
- Charles Allard, 1920/21
- Ivan Allardyce, 1917/18
- Percy Allen, 1928/29–1934/35
- Geoff Allott, 1994/95–2000/01
- Samuel Alpe, 1875/76–1879/80
- Carl Anderson, 1997/98–2005/06
- Corey Anderson, 2006/07–2010/11
- Fred Anderson, 2014/15
- Gordon Anderson, 1949/50–1950/51
- Ian Anderson, 1964/65
- Mac Anderson, 1938/39–1949/50
- Robert Anderson, 1967/68
- Gareth Andrew, 2012/13
- Bryan Andrews, 1963/64–1966/67
- Stan Andrews, 1933/34–1935/36
- Arnold Anthony, 1905/06–1908/09
- Peter Arnold, 1953/54
- David Ashby, 1875/76–1889/90
- Nathan Astle, 1991/92–2006/07
- Todd Astle, 2005/06–2022/23

== B ==
- Kenneth Bain, 1906/07
- Charles Baker, 1971/72
- Thomas Baker, 1874/75–1879/80
- Charles Barker, 1873/74
- Edward Barnes, 1882/83–1893/94
- Andrew Barron, 1904/05
- Robert DW Barry, 1891/92–1904/05
- Robert W Barry, 1901/02
- Gary Bartlett, 1963/64–1965/66
- Hamish Barton, 1998/99–2000/01
- Glenn Bateman, 1979/80–1984/85
- Stephen Bateman, 1976/77–1984/85
- Albert Bates, 1891/92–1897/98
- Bryan Bayley, 1957/58
- Carl Beal, 1913/14–1914/15
- William Beard, 1878/79
- Bill Bell, 1949/50–1958/59
- Francis Bellamy, 1931/32–1938/39
- Hamish Bennett, 2005/06–2015/16
- Joseph Bennett, 1863/64
- Joseph Henry Bennett, 1898/99–1919/20
- Neville Bennett, 1950/51–1951/52
- W Bent, 1867/68 (Note: Bent played in a single match for Canterbury against Otago in February 1868. He is not known to have played any other cricket. Other than a surname and initial no biographical details are known.)
- Jeremy Benton, 2016/17–2018/19
- Larry Bishop, 1905/06–1914/15
- Tony Blain, 1983/84
- Aiden Blizzard, 2014/15–2015/16
- Andrew Bloxam, 1864/65
- Roger Blunt, 1917/18–1924/25
- Bruce Bolton, 1955/56–1964/65
- Shane Bond, 1996/97–2009/10
- Stephen Boock, 1975/76–1977/78
- Jack Booker, 1947/48
- Mick Boon, 1922/23–1926/27
- Rex Booth, 1917/18
- Chad Bowes, 2015/16–2025/26
- Charles Boxshall, 1897/98–1914/15
- David Boyle, 1980/81–1994/95
- Jack Boyle, 2016/17–2021/22
- Justin Boyle, 1986/87–1990/91
- Matt Boyle, 2022/23–2025/26
- Douglas Bracewell, 1973/74–1975/76
- Max Bremner, 1987/88
- Wally Bridgman, 1954/55
- Alan Britton, 1945/46–1952/53
- Charles Broad, 1966/67
- Darren Broom, 2007/08–2008/09
- Neil Broom, 2002/03–2014/15
- Thomas Brosnahan, 1919/20–1928/29
- Vaughan Brown, 1978/79–1986/87
- Dean Brownlie, 2009/10–2013/14
- John Bruges, 1908/09
- Louis Brunton, 1913/14–1925/26
- William Bryars, 1887/88
- James Buchanan, 1883/84–1884/85
- Cran Bull, 1965/66–1983/84
- Alan Burgess, 1940/41–1951/52
- Bob Burns, 1928/29–1933/34
- Jim Burrows, 1926/27–1932/33
- Ryan Burson, 1997/98–2009/10
- Leighton Burtt, 2005/06–2009/10
- Noel Burtt, 1937/38–1947/48
- Tom Burtt, 1943/44–1954/55
- Wayne Burtt, 1965/66–1972/73
- John Bush, 1887/88
- Frank Butler, 1914/15
- Len Butterfield, 1934/35–1945/46

== C ==
- Brad Cachopa, 2012/13–2013/14
- Chris Cairns, 1990/91–2005/06
- John Calder, 1976/77
- Sydney Callaway, 1900/01–1906/07
- William Calvert, 1865/66–1867/68
- Stewart Cameron, 1940/41–1955/56
- Arthur Cant, 1890/91–1900/01
- Tom Carlton, 1909/10–1914/15
- William Carlton, 1909/10–1911/12
- Cecil Carston, 1946/47
- Leo Carter, 2014/15–2023/24
- Robert Carter, 1981/82–1984/85
- Jeff Case, 2017/18–2018/19
- Ernest Caygill, 1910/11–1913/14
- Harry Chamberlain, 2016/17–2024/25
- Mark Chamberlain, 1988/89
- Kit Chambers, 1973/74
- Sunnie Chan, 2005/06–2006/07
- Arthur Chapman, 1881/82–1891/92
- Murray Chapple, 1949/50–1960/61
- Charles Clark, 1895/96–1897/1898
- Mitchell Claydon, 2010/11–2012/13
- Frank Clayton, 1893/94
- Thomas Cobcroft, 1897/98–1899/00
- Alfred Cobden, 1935/36
- Blake Coburn, 2017/18–2022/23
- Louis Cohen, 1890/91
- Anthony Collins, 1976/77–1977/78
- John Collins, 1892/93–1895/96
- Kevin Collins, 1976/77–1978/79
- Peter Coman, 1968/69–1978/79
- Bevan Congdon, 1974/75–1977/78
- Reginald Cook, 1947/48–1948/49
- William Cooke, 1891/92
- Charles Corfe, 1871/72–1883/84
- Cleighten Cornelius, 2000/01–2004/05
- Wade Cornelius, 2000/01–2004/05
- Arthur Cotterill, 1865/66–1873/74
- Edward Cotterill, 1880/81–1889/90
- Henry Cotterill, 1873/74–1884/85
- William Cotterill, 1881/82–1893/94
- Graeme Coull, 1954/55–1961/62
- William Cowlishaw, 1864/65
- Arthur Cox, 1924/25–1926/27
- Cyril Crawford, 1920/21–1931/32
- Ernest Crawshaw, 1907/08–1910/11
- William Crawshaw, 1885/86–1886/87
- Ian Cromb, 1929/30–1946/47
- Dave Crowe, 1957/58
- Charles Cuff, 1907/08
- Len Cuff, 1886/87–1895/96
- Craig Cumming, 1993/94–1999/00
- Gerald Cummins, 1978/79
- Stephen Cunis, 1998/99–2005/06
- Bill Cunningham, 1922/23–1930/31
- Don Currie, 1960/61

== D ==
- Albert Dakin, 1905/06
- Jack D'Arcy, 1955/56–1958/59
- Phil D'Auvergne, 1969/70–1978/79
- Sean Davey, 2019/20–2025/26
- Michael PH Davidson, 2006/07–2008/09
- Michael SJ Davidson, 2015/16–2018/19
- Harry Davis, 1938/39–1939/40 (Note: Davis played in six matches for Canterbury at the start of World War II. No biographical details are known.)
- James Dawe, 1873/74
- William Dawe, 1865/66
- Frederick Dawson, 1950/51
- Greg Dawson, 2014/15
- Jim Dawson, 1957/58–1962/63
- Noel Dellow, 1954/55–1955/56
- Herbert de Maus, 1889/90–1896/97
- David Dempsey, 1979/80–1987/88
- Hono Denham, 1945/46
- James Denham, 1884/85 (Note: Denham played in a single match for Canterbury in the 1884–85 season. No biographical details are known.)
- Alan Devlin, 1983/84
- Brendon Diamanti, 2011/12–2014/15
- Carl Dickel, 1973/74–1974/75
- George Dickinson, 1863/64–1873/74
- Barry Dineen, 1956/57
- Brendon Donkers, 2002/03–2003/04
- Jason Donnelly, 2009/10
- Martin Donnelly, 1938/39–1939/40
- Brad Doody, 1995/96–2001/02
- Neil Dorreen, 1927/28–1930/31
- Ray Dowker, 1949/50–1956/57
- Graham Dowling, 1958/59–1971/72
- Rahul Dravid, 2008/09
- Alby Duckmanton, 1951/52–1961/62
- William Dudney, 1883/84
- David Dunlop, 1883/84–1887/88
- Des Dunnet, 1943/44–1944/45
- Ray Dunster, 1932/33

== E ==
- Warren Eddington, 1977/78–1984/85
- Henry Edser, 1883/84
- Andrew Ellis, 2002/03–2019/20
- Harry Ellis, 1904/05–1908/09
- Ray Emery, 1947/48–1953/54
- John England, 1958/59–1961/62
- Jarrod Englefield, 1999/00–2002/03
- Cyril Edward Evans, 1919/20–1928/29

== F ==
- Tony Farrant, 1980/81–1982/83
- David Farrant, 1980/81–1986/87
- Charles Fearon, 1865/66
- Herbert Fenwick, 1891/92
- Ken Ferries, 1966/67–1974/75
- Brent Findlay, 2005/06–2012/13
- Jim Findlay, 1925/26
- Ronald Fisher, 1904/05–1905/06
- Chris Flanagan, 1986/87–1994/95
- Stephen Fleming, 1991/92–1999/00
- Cam Fletcher, 2014/15–2022/23
- Brian Ford, 1994/95
- Roger Ford, 1988/89–1993/94
- Lindsay Forde, 1973/74–1976/77
- Herbert Forsyth, 1917/18
- Stanley Foster, 1918/19
- Zak Foulkes, 2021/22–2024/25
- John Fowke, 1880/81–1906/07
- Edwin Fowler, 1868/69–1881/82
- John Fowler, 1873/74–1881/82
- Ernest Frankish, 1903/04–1905/06
- Stanley Frankish, 1894/95–1903/04
- Paul Franks, 2002/03
- Carl Frauenstein, 2006/07–2010/11
- Jesse Frew, 2024/25
- Robbie Frew, 1995/96–2002/03
- Charlie Frith, 1877/77–1880/81
- Billy Frith, 1877/78–1888/89
- Arthur Fuller, 1917/18–1923/24
- Edwin Fuller, 1872/73–1882/83
- David Fulton, 2012/13
- Peter Fulton, 2000/01–2016/17
- Roddy Fulton, 1972/73–1984/85

== G ==
- David Gallop, 1956/57–1965/66
- Charles Garrard, 1886/87–1904/05
- Trevor Garrett, 2017/18
- John Garty, 1886/87
- Ernest Gasson, 1924/25–1925/26
- Ernest Gasson, 1937/38
- David Gatenby, 1972/73
- George Gearry, 1953/54–1956/57
- Roy Gearry, 1964/65–1973/74
- Struan George, 2010/11–2011/12
- Lee Germon, 1987/88–1997/98
- Clifford Gibbs, 1929/30
- Michael Godby, 1877/78–1880/81
- Edmund Godwin Austen, 1877/78
- Leslie Gordon, 1917/18
- Maurice Graham, 1934/35–1936/37
- Alec Grant, 1920/21–1921/22
- James Gray, 1917/18–1919/20
- Reg Gregory, 1922/23–1928/29
- Sammy Guillen, 1952/53–1960/61
- Charles Guiney, 1918/19
- John Gully, 1982/83
- Henry Gunthorp, 1895/96
- John Guy, 1957/58–1958/59

== H ==
- Barry Hadlee, 1961/62–1980/81
- Dayle Hadlee, 1969/70–1983/84
- Richard Hadlee, 1971/72–1988/89
- Walter Hadlee, 1933/34–1951/52
- Russell Halley, 1886/87–1890/91
- Ian Hamilton, 1926/27–1932/33
- Brett Hampton, 2017/18
- Brian Harbridge, 1939/40–1940/41
- James Hargreaves, 1886/87
- Edward Harley, 1864/65–1868/69
- Jack Harliwich, 1951/52
- Annesley Harman, 1889/90–1893/94
- Richard Harman, 1883/84–1896/97
- Thomas Harman, 1882/83–1901/02
- Ben Harris, 1988/89–1994/95
- Chris Harris, 1989/90–2009/10
- Clifford Harris, 1928/29–1929/30
- Zin Harris, 1949/50–1963/64
- Ashley Hart, 1981/82–1985/86
- Blair Hartland, 1986/87–1996/97
- Ian Hartland, 1960/61–1965/66
- John Hartland, 1877/78–1890/91
- David Hartshorn, 1984/85–1987/88
- Alfred Hasell, 1894/95–1895/96
- Brian Hastings, 1961/62–1976/77
- Mark Hastings, 1992/93–2000/01
- Brian Haworth, 1953/54–1958/59
- James Hay, 1917/18
- Matthew Hay, 2020/21–2023/24
- Mitchell Hay, 2020/21–2025/26
- John Hayes, 1950/51–1954/55
- William Hayes, 1909/10–1927/28
- Andrew Hazeldine, 2017/18–2021/22
- George Helmore, 1883/84–1891/92
- Graham Henry, 1965/66
- Matt Henry, 2010/11–2024/25
- Rupert Hickmott, 1911/12–1914/15
- Brandon Hiini, 2005/06–2010/11
- Ben Hilfenhaus, 2016/17
- Donald Hill, 1961/62
- Henry Hill, 1873/74
- Andrew Hintz, 1985/86–1987/88
- Ronnie Hira, 2012/13–2015/16
- Ray Hitchcock, 1947/48
- Michael Holding, 1987/88
- Raymond Hope, 1933/34
- Gareth Hopkins, 1998/99–2002/03
- Russell Hortin, 1963/64
- Alan Hounsell, 1969/70–1976/77
- Glynn Howell, 1998/99
- Llorne Howell, 1990/91–1998/99
- William Howell, 1902/03–1918/19
- Punter Humphreys, 1908/09
- Raymond Hunt, 1959/60
- Dylan Hunter, 2023/24
- Michael Hussey, 2015/16
- Neville Huxford, 1967/68–1969/70

== I ==
- Bruce Irving, 1962/63–1972/73
- Brian Isherwood, 1966/67–1972/73

== J ==
- Murray Jack, 1955/56–1957/58
- Charlie Jackman, 1934/35–1936/37
- Bevon Jacobs, 2023/24
- Jack Jacobs, 1927/28–1937/38
- Harley James, 1997/98–2000/01
- Vincent James, 1939/40–1944/45
- Kyle Jamieson, 2013/14–2024/25
- Scott Janett, 2024/25
- Terry Jarvis, 1969/70–1970/71
- Trevor Jesty, 1979/80
- Tim Johnston, 2011/12–2017/18
- Noel Jones, 1918/19–1920/21
- Raymond Jones, 1980/81–1984/85

== K ==
- Marty Kain, 2008/09–2010/11
- Raunaq Kapur, 2025/26
- Simon Keen, 2013/14
- Hamish Kember, 1991/92–1994/95
- Graeme Kench, 1982/83
- Peter Kennedy, 1985/86–1991/92
- Jack Kerr, 1929/30–1939/40
- Jack Kiddey, 1956/57–1964/65
- Harvey King, 1977/78
- Alfred Kinvig, 1901/02–1903/04
- Christopher Kirk, 1969/70–1978/79
- Ernest Kitto, 1894/95
- Nick Kwant, 2017/18

== L ==
- Andrew Labatt, 1887/88–1895/96
- Frederick Labatt, 1891/92
- Henry Lance, 1863/64–1864/65
- Mark Lane, 1995/96–1996/97
- Rod Latham, 1980/81–1994/95
- Tom Latham, 2010/11–2025/26
- Ben Laughlin, 2012/13
- Bill Lawrence, 1986/87–1987/88
- James Lawrence, 1891/92–1906/07
- William Leach, 1876/77
- George Lee, 1870/71–1875/76
- Roland Lefebvre, 1990/91
- Gordon Leggat, 1944/45–1955/56
- Richard Leggat, 1980/81–1983/84
- Stephen Lester, 1929/30–1935/36
- Malcolm Lohrey, 1943/44
- Arthur Longden, 1883/84–1885/86
- Willie Lonsdale, 2006/07–2012/13
- Tyler Lortan, 2018/19–2020/21
- Henry Loughnan, 1870/71–1886/87
- Harold Lusk, 1906/07–1918/19

== M ==
- Dan McBeath, 1918/19–1926/27
- Ken McClure, 2015/16–2024/25
- Cole McConchie, 2011/12–2025/26
- Ryan McCone, 2007/08–2015/16
- Ben McCord, 2012/13–2014/15
- Brendon McCullum, 2003/04–2006/07
- Farquhar MacDonald, 1889/90–1896/97
- Garry MacDonald, 1984/85–1990/91
- Randell McDonnell, 1864/65
- William McDowell, 1883/84
- Matt McEwan, 2011/12–2013/14
- Paul McEwan, 1976/77–1990/91
- James McEwin, 1917/18–1927/28
- James MacFarlane, 1893/94–1895/96
- Tony MacGibbon, 1947/48–1961/62
- Tim McIntosh, 2004/05
- John McIntyre, 1965/66–1968/69
- Angus McKenzie, 2022/23–2025/26
- Marcel McKenzie, 1998/99–2001/02
- John Mackle, 1980/81–1981/82
- Duncan McLachlan, 1914/15–1921/22
- Nixon McLean, 2005/06
- Donald MacLeod, 1967/68
- Craig McMillan, 1994/95–2009/10
- Samuel McMurray, 1884/85–1896/97
- Steve McNally, 1978/79–1985/86
- Ken McNicholl, 1952/53–1956/57
- Don McRae, 1937/38–1945/46
- Tom MacRury, 2018/19
- Laurie Mahoney, 1948/49
- Randolph Mainwaring, 1866/67–1870/71
- Francis Malet, 1883/84
- Thomas Malone, 1895/96–1908/09
- Edward Maples, 1868/69–1873/74
- Walter Mapplebeck, 1936/37–1940/41
- Rhys Mariu, 2022/23–2025/26
- George Marshall, 1888/89–1890/91
- Chris Martin, 1997/98–2009/10
- Bob Masefield, 1984/85
- Harold Mathias, 1883/84–1886/87
- Rodolph Mathias, 1888/89–1893/94
- Neil Maxwell, 1997/98
- John Medlow, 1894/95 (Note: Medlow played in a single match for Canterbury in the 1894/95 season. Apart from a birth year of 1852, no biographical details are known.)
- Wally Mendelson, 1893/94
- Robert Menzies, 1936/37–1940/41
- Russell Merrin, 1967/68–1974/75
- Bill Merritt, 1926/27–1935/36
- Robbie Miller, 2002/03
- William Millton, 1877/78–1886/87
- Daryl Mitchell, 2020/21–2024/25
- Sonny Moloney, 1940/41
- Harold Monaghan, 1913/14
- John Monck, 1873/74
- Henry Moore, 1876/77–1878/79
- Thomas Moore, 1866/67–1874/75
- Malcolm Moorhouse, 1883/84–1907/08
- Wilson Morrison, 1877/78
- Albert Moss, 1889/90
- Dick Motz, 1957/58–1968/69
- Thomas Moynihan, 1940/41–1952/53
- Glenn Muir, 1994/95–1997/98
- Ted Mulcock, 1936/37–1938/39
- Stephen Murdoch, 2018/19–2019/20
- Darrin Murray, 1990/91–1997/98
- Johannes Myburgh, 2007/08–2009/10
- Henry Mytton, 1863/64–1866/67

== N ==
- Dirk Nannes, 2010/11–2012/13
- Anup Nathu, 1983/84–1991/92
- William Neilson, 1874/75–1878/79
- Jack Newman, 1922/23
- Jack Newman, 1927/28–1928/29
- Frank Newton, 1938/39
- Robbie Newton, 1973/74
- Henry Nicholls, 2011/12–2025/26
- Ross Nicholson, 1959/60
- Rob Nicol, 2009/10–2013/14
- Douglas Nixon, 1926/27–1927/28
- Wayne Noon, 1994/95
- Alfred Norman, 1907/08–1912/13
- Henry North, 1917/18
- Thomas North, 1893/94–1896/97
- Andrew Nuttall, 1982/83–1989/90
- Ed Nuttall, 2011/12–2023/24

== O ==
- Francis O'Brien, 1932/33–1945/46
- Charles Odell, 1869/70–1870/71
- Henry Ogier, 1889/90–1891/92
- Charlie Oliver, 1923/24–1936/37
- Arthur Ollivier, 1866/67–1882/83
- Frank Ollivier, 1867/68
- Keith Ollivier, 1900/01–1911/12
- Peter O'Malley, 1947/48–1954/55
- Sydney Orchard, 1894/95–1912/13
- Will O'Rourke, 2021/22–2024/25
- Michael Owens, 1991/92–1997/98

== P ==
- Augustus Page, 1884/85
- Curly Page, 1920/21–1936/37
- Edwin Palmer, 1892/93–1893/94
- Michael Papps, 1998/99–2010/11
- Tim Papps, 2003/04–2004/05
- Murray Parker, 1973/74–1978/79
- Jim Parks, 1946/47
- Jonathan Parson, 1960/61
- James Paterson, 1912/13–1913/14
- Bill Patrick, 1905/06–1926/27
- Cameron Paul, 2023/24–2024/25
- Scott Pawson, 1995/96–1998/99
- Walter Pearce, 1893/94–1902/03
- Everard Perrin, 1917/18–1918/19
- Arthur Perry, 1877/78
- Cecil Perry, 1870/71
- Richard Petrie, 1988/89–1992/93
- Jim Phillips, 1898/99
- John Phillips, 1977/78
- Philip Philpott, 1881/82
- W Pierce, 1869/70–1872/73 (Note: Pierce, a left-arm bowler, played in four matches for Canterbury. Other than a surname and initial no biographical details are known.)
- William Pocock, 1882/83–1883/84
- Michael Pollard, 2017/18
- Vic Pollard, 1969/70–1974/75
- William Pollitt, 1946/47–1947/48
- Matt Poore, 1950/51–1961/62
- Bob Powell, 1922/23
- John Powell, 1928/29–1932/33
- Arthur Powys, 1863/64–1867/68
- Richard Powys, 1865/66–1866/67
- Mark Priest, 1984/85–1998/99

== Q ==
- John Quinn, 1994/95

== R ==
- Ben Rae, 2006/07–2007/08
- Michael Rae, 2023/24–2025/26
- Frank Rapley, 1957/58–1959/60
- David Rathie, 1979/80
- Peter Rattray, 1980/81–1984/85
- George Rayner, 1884/85–1889/90
- Reg Read, 1904/05–1937/38
- Lawrence Reade, 1869/70
- Arthur Redmayne, 1880/81
- Aaron Redmond, 1999/00–2003/04
- Jack Reece, 1947/48
- Francis Reeder, 1873/74
- Darron Reekers, 1994/95–2001/02
- Dan Reese, 1895/96–1920/21
- Daniel Reese, 1917/18–1920/21
- John Reese, 1900/01
- Tom Reese, 1887/88–1917/18
- William Reeves, 1879/80–1887/88
- Doug Reid, 1953/54–1956/57
- Henry Richards, 1987/88
- Archibald Ridley, 1889/90–1909/10
- Harry Ridley, 1891/92–1904/05
- Reginald Ridley, 1905/06–1906/07
- Jim Riley, 1968/69
- Les Riley, 1933/34
- Michael Rippon, 2023/24–2025/26
- Bryan Ritchie, 1979/80–1981/82
- Charles Rix, 1922/23
- Alby Roberts, 1927/28–1940/41
- Stu Roberts, 1985/86–1995/96
- Iain Robertson, 2004/05–2008/09
- William Robertson, 1893/94–1900/01
- Mark Robinson, 1988/89
- Arthur Rolleston, 1889/90–1890/91
- Craig Ross, 2005/06
- Edward Ross, 1883/84
- James Rothwell, 1883/84
- Matt Rowe, 2024/25
- Gavin Royfee, 1952/53
- Paul Rugg, 2003/04
- John Ruston, 1962/63
- Paul Rutledge, 1982/83
- Maurice Ryan, 1965/66–1978/79

== S ==
- George Sale, 1863/64–1864/65
- Brian Sampson, 1969/70
- Henry Sampson, 1976/77
- Daniel Sams, 2017/18
- Don Sandman, 1909/10–1926/27
- George Savile, 1871/72
- Ken Saxon, 1923/24
- Roy Scott, 1940/41–1954/55
- Henry Secretan, 1876/77–1886/87
- Richard Shand, 1937/38–1946/47
- Peter Sharp, 1964/65–1965/66
- Murray Sharp, 1936/37–1945/46
- Michael Sharpe, 1990/91–1996/97
- Hayden Shaw, 1999/00–2004/05
- Fraser Sheat, 2017/18–2025/26
- Alfred Sheath, 1879/80
- Richard Sherlock, 2005/06–2010/11
- Henry Shipley, 2015/16–2024/25
- Geoffrey Simmonds, 1929/30
- Arthur Sims, 1896/97–1912/13
- Ian Sinclair, 1953/54–1956/57
- Amandeep Singh, 2006/07–2007/08
- Chris Small, 2006/07
- Peter Small, 1945/46–1958/59
- Brun Smith, 1946/47–1952/53
- Dennis Smith, 1933/34
- Frank Smith, 1922/23
- Geoff Smith, 1977/78–1979/80
- John Smith, 1943/44–1945/46
- Clifford Snook, 1947/48–1949/50
- Ish Sodhi, 2022/23–2025/26
- John Souter, 1871/72–1873/74
- Roger Sowden, 1972/73
- Donald Stark, 1953/54
- David Stead, 1969/70–1985/86
- Gary Stead, 1993/94–2005/06
- Wayne Stead, 1997/98
- Frederick Stephenson, 1895/96–1896/97
- Colin Stevens, 1966/67
- Edward Stevens, 1863/64–1883/84
- John Stevens, 1863/64–1865/66
- Shanan Stewart, 2001/02–2013/14
- Ben Stokes, 2017/18
- Norm Stokes, 1937/38–1938/39
- C Strange, 1884/85 (Note: Strange played twice for the team in first-class matches and in one other match for Canterbury. Other than a surname and initial no biographical details are known.)
- Raymond Strange, 1901/02–1903/04
- Gilbert Stringer, 1933/34
- Edgar Studholme, 1891/92
- William Studholme, 1887/88–1888/89
- Thomas Sweet, 1874/75–1876/77

== T ==
- George Talbot, 1929/30
- Ron Talbot, 1922/23–1932/33
- Bruce Taylor, 1964/65–1969/70
- Harry Taylor, 1919/20–1920/21
- Ken Taylor, 1983/84–1984/85
- Robert Taylor, 1863/64–1868/69
- Ryan ten Doeschate, 2010/11
- Augustus Tennant, 1863/64–1865/66
- Craig Thiele, 1980/81–1985/86
- Arthur Thomas, 1911/12–1922/23
- Barry Thomas, 1980/81
- Keith Thomson, 1959/60–1974/75
- Bill Thomson, 1973/74
- Lindsay Thorn, 1978/79–1979/80
- Sean Tracy, 1985/86
- Charles Treweek, 1889/90–1894/95
- David Trist, 1969/70–1981/82
- Peter Truscott, 1961/62
- George Turner, 1878/79–1879/80

== U ==
- Paul Unwin, 1993/94
- Hopere Uru, 1893/94–1894/95
- Ken Uttley, 1940/41–1945/46

== V ==
- Logan van Beek, 2009/10–2016/17
- Johan van der Wath, 2010/11
- Theo van Woerkom, 2015/16–2022/23
- Kruger van Wyk, 2006/07–2009/10
- John Veitch, 1964/65
- Michael Vermuelen, 2009/10
- Luke Vivian, 2006/07

== W ==
- Ken Wadsworth, 1972/73–1975/76
- Henry Waine, 1944/45
- Alexander Walker, 1866/67–1869/70
- Gary Walklin, 1973/74
- Peter Wallace, 1973/74
- William Walmsley, 1889/90
- Cyril Walter, 1945/46
- Tim Walton, 1998/99
- Barry Ward, 1986/87
- James Ward, 2000/01–2004/05
- John Ward, 1959/60–1970/71
- Arthur Washer, 1884/85
- George Watson, 1880/81–1883/84
- H Watson, 1909/10–1920/21 (Note: Watson played 10 first-class matches for the team before and after the First World War. Other than a surname and initial no biographical details are known.)
- Harold Watson, 1917/18
- Leslie Watson, 1978/79
- Shane Watson, 2015/16
- Murray Webb, 1972/73
- Bob Webb, 1937/38–1949/50
- George Weston, 1903/04–1904/05
- Reginald Westwood, 1940/41
- John Wheatley, 1882/83–1903/04
- Onslow Whitford, 1947/48
- Harry Whitta, 1903/04–1919/20
- Peter Wight, 1963/64
- William Wigley, 1893/94–1903/04
- Anthony Wilding, 1900/01–1901/02
- Frederick Wilding, 1881/82–1899/00
- John Williams, 1952/53
- Kenneth Williams, 1906/07–1907/08
- Will Williams, 2012/13–2021/22
- Alexander Cracroft Wilson, 1877/78
- George Wilson, 1913/14
- Ian Wilson, 1977/78–1979/80
- Simon Wilson, 1994/95
- Walter Wilson, 1863/64–1864/65
- Paul Wiseman, 2001/02–2005/06
- Warren Wisneski, 1996/97–2003/04
- Gerald Wontner, 1872/73
- Bernard Wood, 1907/08–1918/19
- John Wood, 1868/69–1877/78
- Frank Woods, 1913/14–1926/27
- George Worker, 2011/12–2013/14
- Rupert Worker, 1919/20–1922/23
- Ernest Wright, 1899/00
- Geoff Wright, 1955/56
- John Wright, 1984/85–1988/89

== Y ==
- Yasir Arafat, 2011/12
- Ben Yock, 1996/97–1997/98
- George Young, 1866/67–1867/68
- Jack Young, 1921/22–1923/24
- Reece Young, 2010/11–2011/12

== D Reese's XI ==
As well as top-level matches played by Canterbury, a single first-class match was played by a team organised by Dan Reese in April 1914. The team, which is known as D Reese's Canterbury XI, played against Wellington at the Basin Reserve, losing heavily. All but one of the cricketers who played for Reese's XI also appeared for Canterbury. The exception is listed below:

- John Barrett, 1913/14 (Note: Barrett was born at Hokitika in 1875 and educated at Christ's College in Christchurch. In the 1914 match he made scores of four not out and one, and is known to have also played matches for the St Albans club in Christchurch. Professionally he worked as a solicitor, was a racehorse owner, and served as the secretary of the New Zealand Cricket Council, also acting as chairman for a period. He died at Christchurch in 1931; an obituary was published in the 1932 edition of Wisden Cricketers' Almanack.)
