= Ernest Gasson =

Ernest Gasson can refer to:

- Ernest Gasson (cricketer, born 1887) (1887–1962), New Zealand cricketer
- Ernest Gasson (cricketer, born 1907) (1907–1942), New Zealand cricketer
