= Gasson =

Gasson is a surname. Notable people with the surname include:

- Ernest Gasson (cricketer, born 1887) (1887–1962), New Zealand cricketer
- Ernest Gasson (cricketer, born 1907) (1907–1942), New Zealand cricketer
- George Gasson (born 1997), Welsh rugby union player
- Helena Gasson (born 1994), New Zealand Olympic swimmer
- Jacqui Gasson (1938–2020), British politician
- Mark Gasson, British scientist at the University of Reading, UK
- Richard Gasson (1842–1864), American soldier who fought in the American Civil War
- Thomas I. Gasson (1859–1930), American Catholic priest and Jesuit

== See also ==
- Gasson Hall, building on the campus of Boston College in Chestnut Hill, Massachusetts
- Gaston (disambiguation)
