= Edward Harley =

Edward Harley may refer to:

- Edward Harley (Parliamentarian) (1624–1700) of Brampton Bryan, Herefordshire
- Edward Harley (1664–1735), MP for Droitwich 1695–1698 and later for Leominster
- Edward Harley, 2nd Earl of Oxford and Earl Mortimer (1689–1741), son of Robert Harley, 1st Earl of Oxford and Earl Mortimer
- Edward Harley, 3rd Earl of Oxford and Earl Mortimer (1699–1755)
- Edward Harley, 4th Earl of Oxford and Earl Mortimer (1726–1790)
- Edward Harley, 5th Earl of Oxford and Earl Mortimer (1773–1849)
- Edward Harley (cricketer) (1839–1901), English cricketer
