= Kench =

Kench is a surname. Notable people with the surname include:

- Graeme Kench (born 1959), New Zealand cricketer
- Jeremy Kench (born 1984), New Zealand basketball player
- Thelma Kench (1914–1985), New Zealand sprinter
