= John Souter =

John Souter may refer to:

- John Bulloch Souter, Scottish painter, sculptor, and illustrator
- John Souter (cricketer), New Zealand cricketer
