= Alan Devlin =

Alan Devlin can refer to:

- Alan Devlin (actor) (1948–2011), Irish actor
- Alan Devlin (cricketer) (born 1959), New Zealand cricketer
- Alan Devlin (footballer) (born 1953), Scottish footballer
