= Leslie Watson =

Leslie Watson may refer to:

- Leslie Watson (cricketer) (1956–2024), New Zealand cricketer
- Leslie Watson (runner) (1945–2024), British runner, physiotherapist and powerlifter
- Les Watson (1909–1991), English lawn bowler
