= William Calvert =

William Calvert may refer to:

- William Calvert (Australian politician) (1871–1942), member of the Tasmanian Legislative Council for Huon 1924–42
- William Calvert (cricketer) (1839–1894), New Zealand cricketer
- William Calvert (MP) (c. 1703–1761), Lord Mayor of London 1748–49, MP for Old Sarum 1755–61 and for the City of London 1742–47
- William Samuel Calvert (1859–1930), Canadian politician

== See also ==
- Calvert (name)
