= Wontner =

Wontner is a surname. Notable people with the surname include:

- Arthur Wontner (1875–1960), English actor
- Gerald Wontner (1848-1885), British cricketer
- Hilary Wontner (1912-1984), British actor
- Hugh Wontner (1908–1992), English hotelier and politician
- Tom Wontner (born 1971), English actor
- William Clarke Wontner (1857–1930), English painter
