= Stephen McNally (disambiguation) =

Stephen McNally (1911–1994) was an American actor.

Stephen McNally may also refer to:

- Stephen McNally (footballer) (born 1984), Scottish football (soccer) player
- Stephen McNally (musician) (born 1978), English singer / songwriter
- Steve McNally (doctor), British sports doctor for Manchester United
- Steve McNally (cricketer) (born 1958), who played for Canterbury, New Zealand
