= John Kaldor (disambiguation) =

John Kaldor (born 1936) is an Australian art collector and philanthropist.

John Kaldor or Calder may also refer to:

- John Kaldor, a character in the 1996 novel Awake and Dreaming by Kit Pearson
- John Calder (1927–2018), Canadian and Scottish publisher
- John Calder (cricketer) (1951–2010), New Zealand cricketer
- John Calder (minister) (1733–1815), Scottish dissenting minister and author

== See also ==
- Jon Caldara, American libertarian activist
- John Calder Mackay (1920–2014), American post-war real estate developer
