= John Ruston =

John Ruston may refer to:

- John Ruston (bishop)
- John Ruston (cricketer)
- John E. Ruston, American lawyer from New York
