= James Hargreaves (disambiguation) =

James Hargreaves (1720–1778) was a British weaver, carpenter and inventor, credited with inventing the spinning Jenny.

James Hargreaves may also refer to:

- James Hargreaves (English cricketer) (1859–1922), American-born British cricketer
- James Hargreaves (New Zealand cricketer) (1868-1924), New Zealand cricketer
- James Hargreaves (chemist) (1834–1915), British chemist and inventor
- James McKinley Hargreaves (1883–1883), British World War I flying ace
- George Hargreaves (politician) (James George Hargreaves, born 1958), British religious minister and political campaigner
