= Kenneth Bain =

Kenneth Bain may refer to:

- Kenneth Bain (cricketer), New Zealand cricketer
- Ken Bain, American professor and author
- Kenny Bain, Scottish field hockey player
- Richard Findlater, born Kenneth Bruce Findlater Bain, British theatre critic and biographer
