= Barry Thomas =

Barry Thomas may refer to:

- Barry Thomas (cricketer) (born 1956), New Zealand cricketer
- Barry Thomas (decathlete) (born 1972), British athlete
- Barry Thomas (rugby union) (1937–2018), New Zealand rugby player
- Barry Thomas (sound engineer) (1932–2017), American film sound engineer
- Barry Thomas (speedway rider) (born 1951), British speedway rider
- Barry Thomas (artist), New Zealand artist and film maker
