= Jack Williams (cricketer) =

New Zealand cricketer (1931–2025)

Personal information
- Full name: John Lloyd Williams
- Born: 23 April 1931; Ashburton, New Zealand
- Died: 16 September 2025 (aged 94); Christchurch, New Zealand
- Source: Cricket Archive, 14 October 2025

John Lloyd Williams (23 April 1931 – 16 September 2025) was a New Zealand cricketer. He played three first-class matches for Canterbury in 1952/53.

Williams died in Christchurch on 16 September 2025, at the age of 94.

== See also ==
- List of Canterbury representative cricketers
