= Ben Rae =

New Zealand cricketer (born 1986)

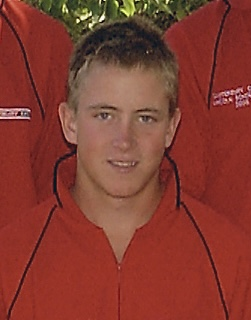
- Rae in 2005

Personal information
- Full name: Benjamin Joseph Rae
- Born: 22 October 1986 (age 40); Christchurch, New Zealand
- Source: Cricinfo, 20 October 2020

Benjamin Joseph Rae (born 22 October 1986) is a New Zealand cricketer. He played in five first-class matches for Canterbury in 2007.

== See also ==
- List of Canterbury representative cricketers
