= Ronald Fisher (cricketer) =

New Zealand cricketer

Personal information
- Born: 28 February 1880; Christchurch, New Zealand
- Died: 26 March 1959 (aged 79); Sydney, Australia
- Source: Cricinfo, 15 October 2020

Ronald Fisher (28 February 1880 – 26 March 1959) was a New Zealand cricketer. He played in three first-class matches for Canterbury from 1904 to 1906.

== See also ==
- List of Canterbury representative cricketers
