= Fred Anderson (cricketer) =

New Zealand cricketer (born 1994)

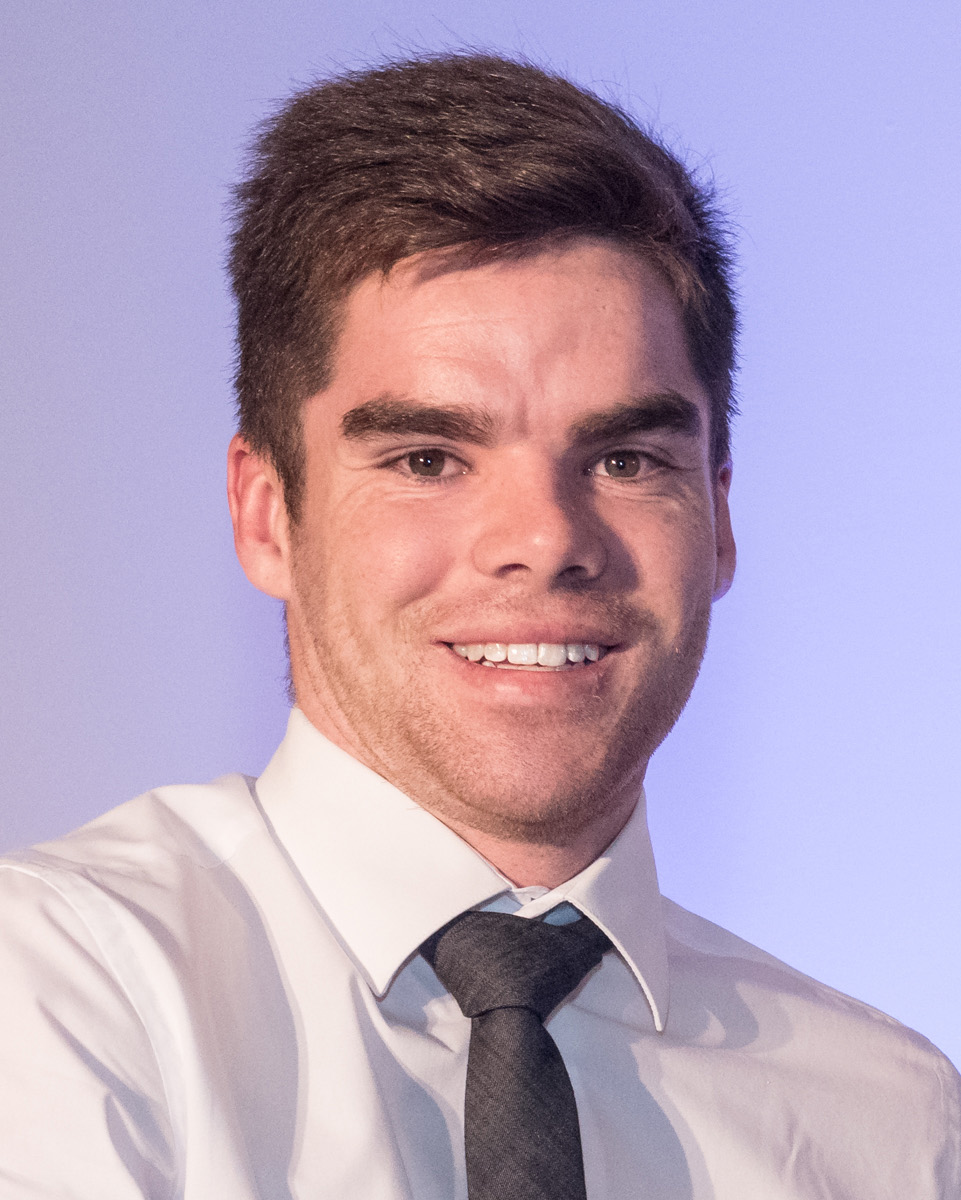
- Anderson in 2015

Personal information
- Full name: Frederick George Anderson
- Born: 1 April 1994 (age 32); Christchurch, New Zealand
- Source: Cricinfo, 13 October 2020

Frederick George Anderson (born 1 April 1994) is a New Zealand cricketer. He played in four first-class and four List A matches for Canterbury in 2014/15.

== See also ==
- List of Canterbury representative cricketers
