= Lindsay Forde =

New Zealand cricketer (born 1954)

Personal information
- Born: 27 July 1954 (age 72); Dunedin, New Zealand
- Source: Cricinfo, 15 October 2020

Lindsay Forde (born 27 July 1954) is a New Zealand cricketer. He played in four first-class and three List A matches for Canterbury from 1975 to 1977.

== See also ==
- List of Canterbury representative cricketers
