= John Phillips (New Zealand cricketer) =

New Zealand cricketer

Personal information
- Born: 18 September 1949; Christchurch, New Zealand
- Died: 19 October 2017 (aged 68); Christchurch, New Zealand
- Source: Cricinfo, 20 October 2020

John Phillips (18 September 1949 – 19 October 2017) was a New Zealand cricketer. He played in one first-class match for Canterbury in 1977/78.

== See also ==
- List of Canterbury representative cricketers
