= Reginald Westwood =

New Zealand cricketer

Personal information
- Born: 19 October 1907; Foxton, New Zealand
- Died: 4 May 1980 (aged 72); Palmerston North, New Zealand
- Source: Cricinfo, 22 October 2020

Reginald Westwood (19 October 1907 – 4 May 1980) was a New Zealand cricketer. He played in three first-class matches for Canterbury in 1940/41.

== See also ==
- List of Canterbury representative cricketers
