= Herbert Alington =

English cricketer (1842–1938)

Personal information
- Full name: William Herbert Alington
- Born: 13 December 1842; Spilsby, England
- Died: 13 January 1938 (aged 95); Wandsworth, England
- Source: Cricinfo, 13 October 2020

Herbert Alington (13 December 1842 – 13 January 1938) was an English cricketer. He played in two first-class matches in New Zealand for Canterbury from 1868 to 1870.

== See also ==
- List of Canterbury representative cricketers
