= Carl Anderson (cricketer) =

New Zealand cricketer (born 1977)

Personal information
- Born: 4 October 1977 (age 49); Christchurch, New Zealand
- Source: Cricinfo, 13 October 2020

Carl Anderson (born 4 October 1977) is a New Zealand cricketer. He played in 17 first-class and 54 List A matches for Canterbury between 1997 and 2006.

== See also ==
- List of Canterbury representative cricketers
