= Frank Ollivier =

New Zealand cricketer

Personal information
- Born: 1845; Hammersmith, England
- Died: 19 May 1918 (aged 72–73); Sydney, Australia
- Source: Cricinfo, 20 October 2020

Frank Ollivier (1845 – 19 May 1918) was a New Zealand cricketer. He played in one first-class match for Canterbury in 1867/68.

== See also ==
- List of Canterbury representative cricketers
