= Garry MacDonald (cricketer) =

New Zealand cricketer (born 1956)

Personal information
- Full name: Garry Kevin MacDonald
- Born: 12 August 1956 (age 70); Blenheim, New Zealand
- Source: Cricinfo, 17 October 2020

Garry Kevin MacDonald (born 12 August 1956) is a New Zealand cricketer. He played in eighteen first-class matches for Canterbury from 1984 to 1991.

== See also ==
- List of Canterbury representative cricketers
