= Henry North (cricketer) =

New Zealand cricketer

Personal information
- Born: 21 September 1883; Dunedin, New Zealand
- Died: 8 June 1952 (aged 68); Christchurch, New Zealand
- Source: Cricinfo, 17 October 2020

Henry North (21 September 1883 – 8 June 1952) was a New Zealand cricketer. He played in three first-class matches for Canterbury in 1917/18.

== See also ==
- List of Canterbury representative cricketers
