= Alfred Cobden =

New Zealand cricketer

Personal information
- Full name: Alfred Palmerston Cobden
- Born: 9 May 1913; Christchurch, New Zealand
- Died: 24 October 1942 (aged 29); El Alamein, Egypt
- Source: Cricinfo, 15 October 2020

Alfred Palmerston Cobden (9 May 1913 – 24 October 1942) was a New Zealand cricketer. He played in two first-class matches for Canterbury in 1935/36. He was killed in action during World War II.

== See also ==
- List of Canterbury representative cricketers
