= James Rothwell (cricketer) =

New Zealand cricketer

Personal information
- Born: c. 1844; Chester, England
- Died: 29 December 1927 (aged 82–83); Timaru, New Zealand
- Source: Cricinfo, 20 October 2020

James Rothwell (c. 1844 – 29 December 1927) was a New Zealand cricketer. He played in one first-class match for Canterbury in 1883/84.

== See also ==
- List of Canterbury representative cricketers
