= Edward Maples =

New Zealand cricketer

Personal information
- Born: 1840; Liverpool, England
- Died: 8 June 1878 (aged 37–38); Christchurch, New Zealand
- Source: Cricinfo, 17 October 2020

Edward Maples (1840 – 8 June 1878) was a New Zealand cricketer. He played in six first-class matches for Canterbury from 1868 to 1874.

== See also ==
- List of Canterbury representative cricketers
