= Laurie Mahoney =

New Zealand cricketer

Personal information
- Born: 14 January 1914; Christchurch, New Zealand
- Died: 31 January 2008 (aged 94); Christchurch, New Zealand
- Source: Cricinfo, 17 October 2020

Laurie Mahoney (14 January 1914 – 31 January 2008) was a New Zealand cricketer. He played in two first-class matches for Canterbury in 1948/49.

== See also ==
- List of Canterbury representative cricketers
