= Peter Small (cricketer) =

New Zealand cricketer (1925–2003)

Personal information
- Born: 20 January 1925; Christchurch, New Zealand
- Died: 21 April 2003 (aged 78); Christchurch, New Zealand
- Source: Cricinfo, 20 October 2020

Peter Small (20 January 1925 – 21 April 2003) was a New Zealand cricketer. He played in thirteen first-class matches for Canterbury from 1946 to 1959.

== See also ==
- List of Canterbury representative cricketers
