= John Quinn (Canterbury cricketer) =

New Zealand cricketer (born 1970)

Personal information
- Born: 15 September 1970 (age 56); Chertsey, England
- Source: Cricinfo, 20 October 2020

John Quinn (born 15 September 1970) is a New Zealand cricketer. He played in one List A match for Canterbury in 1994/95.

== See also ==
- List of Canterbury representative cricketers
