= William Pollitt (cricketer) =

New Zealand cricketer

Personal information
- Born: 22 June 1918
- Died: 19 August 1978 (aged 60); Palmerston North, New Zealand
- Source: Cricinfo, 20 October 2020

William Pollitt (22 June 1918 – 19 August 1978) was a New Zealand cricketer. He played in four first-class matches for Canterbury from 1946 to 1948.

== See also ==
- List of Canterbury representative cricketers
