= Charles Allard (cricketer) =

New Zealand cricketer

Charles Wright Allard
Personal information
- Born: 29 December 1885; Christchurch, New Zealand
- Died: 2 April 1965 (aged 79); Kaiapoi, New Zealand
- Source: Cricinfo, 13 October 2020

Charles Wright Allard (29 December 1885 – 2 April 1965) was a New Zealand cricketer. He played in one first-class match for Canterbury in 1920/21.

== See also ==
- List of Canterbury representative cricketers
