= James Buchanan (New Zealand cricketer) =

New Zealand cricketer (1860–1921)

Personal information
- Full name: James Telfer Buchanan
- Born: 13 September 1860; Stonehouse, Plymouth, Devon, England
- Died: 30 December 1921 (aged 61); Mosman, Sydney, Australia
- Role: Opening batsman

Domestic team information
- Years: Team
- 1883–84 to 1884–85: Canterbury

Career statistics
Competition	First-class
Matches	5
Runs scored	175
Batting average	19.44
100s/50s	0/1
Top score	64
Catches/stumpings	8/–
- Source: Cricinfo, 4 September 2021

James Telfer Buchanan (13 September 1860 – 30 December 1921) was a New Zealand cricketer, born in England. He played in five first-class matches for Canterbury from 1883 to 1885.

Buchanan's highest first-class score was 64, Canterbury's top score, when he opened the innings against Wellington in April 1884. The Christchurch paper the Lyttelton Times reported: "His style was good, defence combined with hard, clean, all-round hitting, particularly on the off, and everything along the carpet – one of the prettiest innings played at Lancaster Park for some time."

He moved to Australia, taking a partnership as a wine and spirit merchant in Melbourne between 1894 and 1908. He and his wife Minnie then moved to Sydney, where he retired. He died at their residence in Mosman in December 1921, aged 61.

== See also ==
- List of Canterbury representative cricketers
