= Reg Cook =

New Zealand cricketer

Personal information
- Full name: Reginald Frederick Cook
- Born: 11 August 1913; Christchurch, New Zealand
- Died: 29 July 1954 (aged 40); Ashburton, New Zealand
- Source: Cricinfo, 15 October 2020

Reginald Frederick Cook (11 August 1913 – 29 July 1954) was a New Zealand cricketer. He played in four first-class matches for Canterbury from 1942 to 1949.

Cook was a leg-spin bowler. His best first-class figures for Canterbury were 4 for 41 against the touring Fijian team in March 1948. He had a long career with the Old Boys club in senior Christchurch cricket, holding the club's wicket-taking record with 552 wickets. In one afternoon's play in November 1946 he took 14 wickets for 88 from 44 overs.

Cook worked on the grain and seed staff of Dalgety in Christchurch and Ashburton. He then took up farming at Rakaia, near Ashburton, where he died suddenly in July 1954, aged 40, leaving his wife Peggy and their two young sons.

== See also ==
- List of Canterbury representative cricketers
