= Chris Small (cricketer) =

New Zealand cricketer (born 1986)

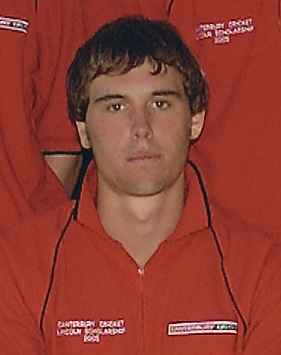
- Small in 2005

Personal information
- Full name: Christopher Arran Small
- Born: 30 November 1986 (age 39); Christchurch, New Zealand
- Source: Cricinfo, 20 October 2020

Christopher Arran Small (born 30 November 1986) is a New Zealand cricketer. He played in three first-class matches for Canterbury in 2006.

== See also ==
- List of Canterbury representative cricketers
