= Clifford Snook =

New Zealand cricketer

Personal information
- Born: 24 September 1924; Christchurch, New Zealand
- Died: 9 October 2013 (aged 89); Christchurch, New Zealand
- Source: Cricinfo, 20 October 2020

Clifford Snook (24 September 1924 – 9 October 2013) was a New Zealand cricketer. He played in five first-class matches for Canterbury from 1947 to 1950.

== See also ==
- List of Canterbury representative cricketers
