= Wilson Morrison =

New Zealand cricketer

Personal information
- Born: c. 1851; Dublin, Ireland
- Died: 28 October 1882 (aged 30–31); Auckland, New Zealand
- Source: Cricinfo, 17 October 2020

Wilson Morrison (c. 1851 – 28 October 1882) was a New Zealand cricketer. He played in one first-class match for Canterbury in 1877/78.

== See also ==
- List of Canterbury representative cricketers
