= Ian Anderson (New Zealand cricketer) =

New Zealand cricketer

Personal information
- Born: 23 June 1925; Christchurch, New Zealand
- Died: 13 August 1977 (aged 52); Christchurch, New Zealand
- Source: Cricinfo, 13 October 2020

Ian Anderson (23 June 1925 – 13 August 1977) was a New Zealand cricketer. He played in one first-class match for Canterbury in 1964/65.

== See also ==
- List of Canterbury representative cricketers
