= James Ward (cricketer) =

New Zealand cricketer (born 1974)

Personal information
- Born: 7 June 1974 (age 52); Christchurch, New Zealand
- Source: Cricinfo, 22 October 2020

James Ward (born 7 June 1974) is a New Zealand cricketer. He played in two first-class matches for Canterbury from 2000 to 2005.

== See also ==
- List of Canterbury representative cricketers
