= Thomas Brosnahan =

New Zealand cricketer

Personal information
- Full name: Thomas Edward Brosnahan
- Born: 17 May 1892; Temuka, New Zealand
- Died: 22 July 1977 (aged 85); Christchurch, New Zealand
- Source: Cricinfo, 14 October 2020

Thomas Brosnahan (17 May 1892 – 22 July 1977) was a New Zealand cricketer. He played in eight first-class matches for Canterbury from 1919 to 1929.

== See also ==
- List of Canterbury representative cricketers
