= William Dawe (cricketer) =

New Zealand cricketer

Personal information
- Born: 8 April 1825; Sherborne, England
- Died: 12 August 1912 (aged 87); Christchurch, New Zealand
- Source: Cricinfo, 15 October 2020

William Dawe (8 April 1825 – 12 August 1912) was a New Zealand cricketer. He played in one first-class match for Canterbury in 1865/66.

== See also ==
- List of Canterbury representative cricketers
