= Joseph Bennett (cricketer, born 1835) =

New Zealand cricketer

Personal information
- Born: 1835
- Died: 28 January 1879 (aged 43–44); Christchurch, New Zealand
- Source: Cricinfo, 14 October 2020

Joseph Bennett (1835 – 28 January 1879) was a New Zealand cricketer. He played in one first-class match for Canterbury in 1863/64.

== See also ==
- List of Canterbury representative cricketers
