= Frank Clayton (Canterbury cricketer) =

New Zealand cricketer

Personal information
- Born: 27 July 1866; Christchurch, New Zealand
- Died: 4 August 1941 (aged 75); Christchurch, New Zealand
- Source: Cricinfo, 15 October 2020

Frank Clayton (27 July 1866 – 4 August 1941) was a New Zealand cricketer. He played in two first-class matches for Canterbury in 1893/94.

== See also ==
- List of Canterbury representative cricketers
