= Gerald Cummins =

New Zealand cricketer (born 1958)

Personal information
- Born: 11 November 1958 (age 68); Rangiora, New Zealand
- Source: Cricinfo, 15 October 2020

Gerald Cummins (born 11 November 1958) is a New Zealand cricketer. He played in three first-class and four List A matches for Canterbury in 1978/79.

== See also ==
- List of Canterbury representative cricketers
