= Thomas Moynihan =

New Zealand cricketer

Personal information
- Born: 27 February 1921; Kaikōura, New Zealand
- Died: 12 December 1988 (aged 67); Christchurch, New Zealand
- Source: Cricinfo, 17 October 2020

Thomas Moynihan (27 February 1921 – 12 December 1988) was a New Zealand cricketer. He played in five first-class matches for Canterbury from 1940 to 1953.

== See also ==
- List of Canterbury representative cricketers
