= Everard Perrin =

New Zealand cricketer

Personal information
- Born: 8 September 1890; Bulls, New Zealand
- Died: 25 December 1945 (aged 55); Christchurch, New Zealand
- Source: Cricinfo, 20 October 2020

Everard Perrin (8 September 1890 – 25 December 1945) was a New Zealand cricketer. He played in four first-class matches for Canterbury from 1917 to 1919.

== See also ==
- List of Canterbury representative cricketers
