= Max Bremner =

New Zealand cricketer (born 1963)

Personal information
- Born: 20 April 1963 (age 63); Dunedin, New Zealand
- Source: Cricinfo, 14 October 2020

Max Bremner (born 20 April 1963) is a New Zealand cricketer. He played in four first-class and six List A matches for Canterbury in 1987/88.

== See also ==
- List of Canterbury representative cricketers
