= Ian Wilson (New Zealand cricketer) =

New Zealand cricketer (born 1952)

Personal information
- Born: 8 August 1952 (age 74); Christchurch, New Zealand
- Source: Cricinfo, 22 October 2020

Ian Wilson (born 8 August 1952) is a New Zealand cricketer. He played in eight first-class matches for Canterbury from 1977 to 1980.

== See also ==
- List of Canterbury representative cricketers
