= Arthur Cant =

New Zealand cricketer

Personal information
- Born: 28 March 1864; Christchurch, New Zealand
- Died: 16 July 1949 (aged 85); Christchurch, New Zealand
- Source: Cricinfo, 15 October 2020

Arthur Cant (28 March 1864 – 16 July 1949) was a New Zealand cricketer. He played in two first-class matches for Canterbury from 1890 to 1901. He was well known. He was the father of Arthur Rolleston Cant.

== See also ==
- List of Canterbury representative cricketers
