= Arthur Fuller (cricketer) =

New Zealand cricketer

Personal information
- Born: 9 August 1880; Christchurch, New Zealand
- Died: 27 September 1947 (aged 67); Christchurch, New Zealand
- Source: Cricinfo, 15 October 2020

Arthur Fuller (9 August 1880 – 27 September 1947) was a New Zealand cricketer. He played in nine first-class matches for Canterbury from 1917 to 1924.

== See also ==
- List of Canterbury representative cricketers
