= Mark Chamberlain (cricketer) =

New Zealand cricketer (born 1961)

Personal information
- Born: 12 May 1961 (age 65); Leeston, New Zealand
- Source: Cricinfo, 15 October 2020

Mark Chamberlain (born 12 May 1961) is a New Zealand former cricketer. He played in one first-class match for Canterbury in 1988/89.

== See also ==
- List of Canterbury representative cricketers
