= William Bryars =

New Zealand cricketer

Personal information
- Born: 1858; Belfast, Ireland
- Died: 3 November 1892 (aged 33–34); New York, United States
- Source: Cricinfo, 14 October 2020

William Bryars (1858 – 3 November 1892) was a New Zealand cricketer. He played in one first-class match for Canterbury in 1887/88.

== See also ==
- List of Canterbury representative cricketers
