= John Hartland =

New Zealand cricketer

Personal information
- Born: 2 January 1862; Christchurch, New Zealand
- Died: 8 February 1918 (aged 56); Remuera, New Zealand
- Source: Cricinfo, 17 October 2020

John Hartland (2 January 1862 – 8 February 1918) was a New Zealand cricketer. He played in five first-class matches for Canterbury from 1877 to 1891.

== See also ==
- List of Canterbury representative cricketers
