= Neville Bennett =

New Zealand cricketer

Personal information
- Born: 1 June 1928; Christchurch, New Zealand
- Died: 1 May 2015 (aged 86); Christchurch, New Zealand
- Source: Cricinfo, 14 October 2020

Neville Bennett (1 June 1928 – 1 May 2015) was a New Zealand cricketer. He played in six first-class matches for Canterbury from 1950 to 1952.

== See also ==
- List of Canterbury representative cricketers
