= Farquhar MacDonald =

New Zealand cricketer

Personal information
- Born: 30 September 1866; Geraldine, New Zealand
- Died: 7 April 1919 (aged 52); Auckland, New Zealand
- Source: Cricinfo, 17 October 2020

Farquhar MacDonald (30 September 1866 – 7 April 1919) was a New Zealand cricketer. He played in four first-class matches for Canterbury from 1889 to 1897.

== See also ==
- List of Canterbury representative cricketers
