= James Gray (New Zealand cricketer) =

New Zealand cricketer

Personal information
- Born: 15 March 1885; Oamaru, New Zealand
- Died: 17 November 1975 (aged 90); Christchurch, New Zealand

Domestic team information
- Years: Team
- 1901/02–1903/04: Canterbury

Career statistics
Competition	First-class
Matches	10
Runs scored	404
Batting average	23.76
100s/50s	1/1
Top score	100
Balls bowled	400
Wickets	9
Bowling average	15.55
5 wickets in innings	1
10 wickets in match	0
Best bowling	7/44
Catches/stumpings	4/0
- Source: Cricinfo, 31 July 2022

James Gray (15 March 1885 – 17 November 1975) was a New Zealand cricketer. He played in ten first-class matches for Canterbury from 1917 to 1920.

In December 1917, Gray, captaining Sydenham in the senior Christchurch competition against Christ's College, scored 343 not out in 225 minutes before declaring the innings closed at 599 for 4. Sydenham won by an innings and 326 runs. Both Gray's score and Sydenham's are still record scores for the Christchurch competition.

Gray made his first-class debut later that month, captaining Canterbury to victory over Otago, scoring 20 and 32 in a low-scoring match. A year later, in the first Plunket Shield match after World War I, he made 100 in 132 minutes, the only century in the match, when Canterbury lost by two wickets to Wellington.

== See also ==
- List of Canterbury representative cricketers
