= Warren Eddington =

New Zealand cricketer (born 1955)

Personal information
- Born: 14 October 1955 (age 71); Methven, New Zealand
- Source: Cricinfo, 15 October 2020

Warren Eddington (born 14 October 1955) is a New Zealand former cricketer. He played in seven first-class matches for Canterbury from 1977 to 1985.

== See also ==
- List of Canterbury representative cricketers
