= Charles Baker (New Zealand cricketer) =

New Zealand cricketer (born 1947)

Personal information
- Born: 7 May 1947 (age 79); Christchurch, New Zealand
- Source: Cricinfo, 14 October 2020

Charles Baker (born 7 May 1947) is a New Zealand cricketer. He played in one first-class and two List A matches for Canterbury in 1971/72.

== See also ==
- List of Canterbury representative cricketers
