= George Young (cricketer) =

New Zealand cricketer

Personal information
- Born: 1847; Ghazipur, India
- Died: 20 April 1935 (aged 87–88); Melbourne, Australia
- Source: Cricinfo, 22 October 2020

George Young (1847 – 20 April 1935) was a New Zealand cricketer. He played in two first-class matches for Canterbury from 1866 to 1868.

== See also ==
- List of Canterbury representative cricketers
