= Geoffrey Simmonds =

New Zealand cricketer

Personal information
- Born: 25 April 1909; Auckland, New Zealand
- Died: 27 November 1976 (aged 67); Whangarei, New Zealand
- Source: Cricinfo, 20 October 2020

Geoffrey Simmonds (25 April 1909 – 27 November 1976) was a New Zealand cricketer. He played in three first-class matches for Canterbury in 1929/30.

== See also ==
- List of Canterbury representative cricketers
