= Robbie Miller (cricketer) =

New Zealand cricketer (born 1979)

Personal information
- Born: 30 December 1979 (age 46); Christchurch, New Zealand
- Source: Cricinfo, 17 October 2020

Robbie Miller (born 30 December 1979) is a New Zealand cricketer. He played in one first-class match for Canterbury in 2002/03.

== See also ==
- List of Canterbury representative cricketers
