= Edgar Studholme =

New Zealand cricketer

Personal information
- Born: 29 July 1866; Te Waimate, New Zealand
- Died: 1 June 1949 (aged 82); Waimate, New Zealand
- Source: Cricinfo, 20 October 2020

Edgar Studholme (29 July 1866 – 1 June 1949) was a New Zealand cricketer. He played in one first-class match for Canterbury in 1891/92.

== See also ==
- List of Canterbury representative cricketers
