= Rex Booth =

New Zealand cricketer

Personal information
- Born: 9 July 1893; Christchurch, New Zealand
- Died: 25 April 1967 (aged 73); Christchurch, New Zealand
- Source: Cricinfo, 14 October 2020

Rex Booth (9 July 1893 – 25 April 1967) was a New Zealand cricketer. He played in four first-class matches for Canterbury in 1917/18.

== See also ==
- List of Canterbury representative cricketers
