= Paul Rugg (cricketer) =

New Zealand cricketer (born 1978)

Personal information
- Born: 20 June 1978 (age 48); Christchurch, New Zealand
- Source: Cricinfo, 20 October 2020

Paul Rugg (born 20 June 1978) is a New Zealand cricketer. He played in two first-class matches for Canterbury in 2004.

== See also ==
- List of Canterbury representative cricketers
