= Norm Stokes =

New Zealand cricketer

Personal information
- Full name: David Norman Stokes
- Born: 16 November 1909; Christchurch, New Zealand
- Died: 31 December 2004 (aged 95); Christchurch, New Zealand
- Source: Cricinfo, 20 October 2020

Norm Stokes (16 November 1909 – 31 December 2004) was a New Zealand cricketer. He played in four first-class matches for Canterbury from 1937 to 1939.

== See also ==
- List of Canterbury representative cricketers
