= Stewart Cameron (cricketer) =

New Zealand cricketer

Personal information
- Born: 11 February 1920; Blenheim, New Zealand
- Died: 31 January 2001 (aged 80); Christchurch, New Zealand
- Source: Cricinfo, 15 October 2020

Stewart Cameron (11 February 1920 – 31 January 2001) was a New Zealand cricketer. He played in five first-class matches for Canterbury from 1940 to 1956.

== See also ==
- List of Canterbury representative cricketers
