= Philip Philpott =

New Zealand cricketer

Personal information
- Born: 5 September 1859; Christchurch, New Zealand
- Died: 27 July 1934 (aged 74); Morrinsville, New Zealand
- Source: Cricinfo, 20 October 2020

Philip Philpott (5 September 1859 – 27 July 1934) was a New Zealand cricketer. He played in one first-class match for Canterbury in 1881/82.

== See also ==
- List of Canterbury representative cricketers
