= Herbert Forsyth =

New Zealand cricketer

Personal information
- Born: 8 July 1896; Christchurch, New Zealand
- Died: 3 May 1969 (aged 72); Christchurch, New Zealand
- Source: Cricinfo, 15 October 2020

Herbert Forsyth (8 July 1896 – 3 May 1969) was a New Zealand cricketer. He played in two first-class matches for Canterbury in 1917/18.

== See also ==
- List of Canterbury representative cricketers
