= William McDowell (cricketer) =

Scottish cricketer

Personal information
- Born: c. 1837; Scotland
- Died: 12 June 1918 (aged 80–81); Christchurch, New Zealand
- Source: Cricinfo, 17 October 2020

William McDowell (c. 1837 – 12 June 1918) was a Scottish cricketer. He played in two first-class matches in New Zealand for Canterbury in 1883/84.

== See also ==
- List of Canterbury representative cricketers
