= Douglas Nixon =

New Zealand cricketer

Personal information
- Born: 10 September 1898; Fairlie, New Zealand
- Died: 3 October 1980 (aged 82); Christchurch, New Zealand
- Source: Cricinfo, 17 October 2020

Douglas Nixon (10 September 1898 – 3 October 1980) was a New Zealand cricketer. He played in six first-class matches for Canterbury from 1926 to 1928.

== See also ==
- List of Canterbury representative cricketers
