= Walter Mapplebeck =

New Zealand cricketer

Personal information
- Full name: Walter Oliver Mapplebeck
- Born: 19 July 1914; Christchurch, New Zealand
- Died: 27 April 1992 (aged 77); Lower Hutt, New Zealand
- Batting: Right-handed
- Bowling: Right-arm fast-medium

Domestic team information
- Years: Team
- 1936-37 to 1940-41: Canterbury

Career statistics
Competition	First-class
Matches	4
Runs scored	53
Batting average	13.25
100s/50s	0/0
Top score	18*
Balls bowled	752
Wickets	21
Bowling average	21.76
5 wickets in innings	2
10 wickets in match	0
Best bowling	6/43
Catches/stumpings	2/0
- Source: Cricinfo, 27 November 2020

Walter Mapplebeck (19 July 1914 – 27 April 1992) was a New Zealand cricketer. He played in four first-class matches for Canterbury from 1936 to 1941.

Mapplebeck was a fast-medium bowler who took 6 for 43 in the first innings in his debut match against Otago in the 1936-37 Plunket Shield. However, he did not play again until the 1940–41 season, when he played his other three matches. In his last match, against Wellington, he took 5 for 59 in the first innings.

Mapplebeck served overseas as an officer in the Royal New Zealand Naval Volunteer Reserve in the Second World War. After the war he worked as a school teacher.

== See also ==
- List of Canterbury representative cricketers
