= Onslow Whitford =

New Zealand cricketer

Personal information
- Born: 26 August 1923; Christchurch, New Zealand
- Died: 11 March 1986 (aged 62); Christchurch, New Zealand
- Source: Cricinfo, 22 October 2020

Onslow Whitford (26 August 1923 – 11 March 1986) was a New Zealand cricketer. He played in one first-class match for Canterbury in 1947/48.

== See also ==
- List of Canterbury representative cricketers
