= Edward Ross (cricketer) =

New Zealand cricketer

Personal information
- Born: 29 January 1860; Christchurch, New Zealand
- Died: 14 April 1937 (aged 77); Christchurch, New Zealand
- Source: Cricinfo, 20 October 2020

Edward Ross (29 January 1860 – 14 April 1937) was a New Zealand cricketer. He played in two first-class matches for Canterbury in 1883/84.

== See also ==
- List of Canterbury representative cricketers
