= James Hay (cricketer) =

New Zealand cricketer

Personal information
- Full name: James Campbell Hay
- Born: 28 December 1885; Akaroa, New Zealand
- Died: 18 October 1936 (aged 50); Pigeon Bay, New Zealand
- Source: Cricinfo, 17 October 2020

James Campbell Hay (28 December 1885 – 18 October 1936) was a New Zealand cricketer. He played in five first-class matches for Canterbury from 1917 to 1919.

== See also ==
- List of Canterbury representative cricketers
