= Thomas Moore (New Zealand cricketer) =

New Zealand cricketer

Personal information
- Born: c. 1844; England
- Died: 23 July 1935 (aged 90–91); Palmerston North, New Zealand
- Source: Cricinfo, 17 October 2020

Thomas Moore (c. 1844 – 23 July 1935) was a New Zealand cricketer. He played in six first-class matches for Canterbury from 1866 to 1875.

== See also ==
- List of Canterbury representative cricketers
