= Wayne Stead =

New Zealand cricketer (born 1973)

Personal information
- Born: 13 April 1973 (age 53); Christchurch, New Zealand
- Source: Cricinfo, 20 October 2020

Wayne Stead (born 13 April 1973) is a New Zealand cricketer. He played in one List A match for Canterbury in 1997/98.

== See also ==
- List of Canterbury representative cricketers
