= Struan George =

New Zealand cricketer (born 1978)

Personal information
- Born: 2 May 1978 (age 48); Timaru, New Zealand
- Source: Cricinfo, 17 October 2020

Struan George (born 2 May 1978) is a New Zealand cricketer. He played in six first-class matches for Canterbury in 2011 and 2012.

== See also ==
- List of Canterbury representative cricketers
