= George Turner (cricketer) =

New Zealand cricketer (1858–1927)

Personal information
- Born: 22 February 1858; Christchurch, New Zealand
- Died: 2 July 1927 (aged 69); Dunedin, New Zealand
- Source: Cricinfo, 20 October 2020

George Turner (22 February 1858 – 2 July 1927) was a New Zealand cricketer. He played in two first-class matches for Canterbury from 1878 to 1880.

== See also ==
- List of Canterbury representative cricketers
