= Louis Cohen (cricketer) =

New Zealand cricketer

Personal information
- Born: 1863; Cooma, Australia
- Died: 16 March 1933 (aged 69–70); Durie Hill, New Zealand
- Source: Cricinfo, 15 October 2020

Louis Cohen (1863 – 16 March 1933) was a New Zealand cricketer. He played in one first-class match for Canterbury in 1890/91.

== See also ==
- List of Canterbury representative cricketers
