= Graeme Coull =

New Zealand cricketer

Personal information
- Full name: Gordon Graeme Coull
- Born: 15 March 1928; Christchurch, New Zealand
- Died: 1 October 2004 (aged 76); Christchurch, New Zealand
- Source: Cricinfo, 15 October 2020

Graeme Coull (15 March 1928 – 1 October 2004) was a New Zealand cricketer. He played in eight first-class matches for Canterbury from 1954 to 1962.

== See also ==
- List of Canterbury representative cricketers
