= Anthony Collins (cricketer) =

New Zealand cricketer (born 1949)

Personal information
- Born: 9 June 1949 (age 77); Christchurch, New Zealand
- Source: Cricinfo, 15 October 2020

Anthony Collins (born 9 June 1949) is a New Zealand cricketer. He played in one first-class and four List A matches for Canterbury from 1976 to 1978.

== See also ==
- List of Canterbury representative cricketers
