= William Walmsley (cricketer) =

New Zealand cricketer

Personal information
- Born: 1859; Blackburn, England
- Died: 16 July 1938 (aged 78–79); Cheviot, New Zealand
- Source: Cricinfo, 22 October 2020

William Walmsley (1859 – 16 July 1938) was a New Zealand cricketer. He played in one first-class match for Canterbury in 1889/90.

== See also ==
- List of Canterbury representative cricketers
