= Ian Hartland =

New Zealand cricketer

Personal information
- Born: 12 August 1939; Christchurch, New Zealand
- Died: 6 March 1992 (aged 52); Christchurch, New Zealand
- Source: Cricinfo, 17 October 2020

Ian Hartland (12 August 1939 – 6 March 1992) was a New Zealand cricketer. He played in sixteen first-class matches for Canterbury from 1960 to 1966.

== See also ==
- List of Canterbury representative cricketers
