= Roger Sowden =

New Zealand cricketer (born 1949)

Personal information
- Born: 27 October 1949 (age 77); Ashburton, New Zealand
- Source: Cricinfo, 20 October 2020

Roger Sowden (born 27 October 1949) is a New Zealand cricketer. He played in one first-class match for Canterbury in 1972/73.

== See also ==
- List of Canterbury representative cricketers
