= Wally Bridgman =

New Zealand cricketer (1931–1996)

Personal information
- Born: 2 April 1931; Invercargill, New Zealand
- Died: 17 November 1996 (aged 65); Hautapu, New Zealand
- Source: Cricinfo, 14 October 2020

Wally Bridgman (2 April 1931 – 17 November 1996) was a New Zealand cricketer. He played in two first-class matches for Canterbury in 1954/55.

== See also ==
- List of Canterbury representative cricketers
