= Kenneth Williams (New Zealand cricketer) =

New Zealand cricketer

Personal information
- Born: 4 January 1882; Christchurch, New Zealand
- Died: 25 March 1920 (aged 38); Christchurch, New Zealand
- Source: Cricinfo, 22 October 2020

Kenneth Williams (4 January 1882 – 25 March 1920) was a New Zealand cricketer. He played in three first-class matches for Canterbury from 1906 to 1914.

== See also ==
- List of Canterbury representative cricketers
