= Henry Richards (cricketer) =

New Zealand cricketer (born 1967)

Personal information
- Born: 14 September 1967 (age 59); Darfield, New Zealand
- Source: Cricinfo, 20 October 2020

Henry Richards (born 14 September 1967) is a New Zealand former cricketer. He played in one first-class match for Canterbury in 1987/88.

== See also ==
- List of Canterbury representative cricketers
