= Scott Pawson =

New Zealand cricketer (born 1974)

Personal information
- Full name: Scott James Pawson
- Born: 21 December 1974 (age 51); Christchurch, New Zealand
- Batting: Left-handed
- Bowling: Right-arm Medium
- Role: All-rounder

Domestic team information
- Years: Team
- 1995/96–1998/99: Canterbury

Career statistics
Competition	FC	LA
Matches	11	3
Runs scored	212	14
Batting average	13.25	14.00
100s/50s	0/1	0/0
Top score	54*	13
Balls bowled	516	-
Wickets	7	-
Bowling average	43.57	-
5 wickets in innings	0	-
10 wickets in match	0	-
Best bowling	2/40	-
Catches/stumpings	8/–	2/–
- Source: Cricinfo, 9 January 2025

Scott Pawson (born 21 December 1974) is a New Zealand cricketer. He played in eleven first-class and three List A matches for Canterbury from 1995 to 1999.

== See also ==
- List of Canterbury representative cricketers
