= Louis Brunton =

New Zealand cricketer

Personal information
- Full name: Louis Richard Brunton
- Born: 29 December 1891; Christchurch, New Zealand
- Died: 23 March 1934 (aged 42); St Albans, Christchurch, New Zealand
- Batting: Right-handed
- Role: Wicket-keeper

Domestic team information
- Years: Team
- 1913–14 to 1925–26: Canterbury

Career statistics
Competition	First-class
Matches	15
Runs scored	343
Batting average	14.29
100s/50s	0/0
Top score	49
Catches/stumpings	25/15
- Source: Cricinfo, 13 January 2023

Louis Richard Brunton (29 December 1891 – 23 March 1934) was a New Zealand cricketer. A wicket-keeper and useful lower-order batsman, he played in fifteen first-class matches for Canterbury from 1913 to 1926.

Brunton served overseas as a medical orderly with the New Zealand Expeditionary Force in World War I. He worked for the Para Rubber Company in Christchurch. He died at home in the Christchurch suburb of St Albans in March 1934 after being ill for some weeks. He was survived by his wife, Jessie.

== See also ==
- List of Canterbury representative cricketers
