= Glenn Muir =

New Zealand cricketer (born 1971)

Personal information
- Born: 17 November 1971 (age 54); Dunedin, New Zealand
- Source: Cricinfo, 17 October 2020

Glenn Muir (born 17 November 1971) is a New Zealand cricketer. He played in six first-class and eleven List A matches for Canterbury from 1994 to 1998.

== See also ==
- List of Canterbury representative cricketers
