= Reginald Ridley =

New Zealand cricketer

Personal information
- Born: 23 March 1883; Christchurch, New Zealand
- Died: 27 October 1971 (aged 88); Hastings, New Zealand
- Source: Cricinfo, 20 October 2020

Reginald Ridley (23 March 1883 – 27 October 1971) was a New Zealand cricketer. He played in two first-class matches for Canterbury from 1905 to 1907.

== See also ==
- List of Canterbury representative cricketers
