= Alexander Walker (cricketer) =

Scottish cricketer

Personal information
- Born: 10 July 1842; Bowland, Scotland
- Died: 15 June 1903 (aged 60); West Kensington, England
- Source: Cricinfo, 22 October 2020

Alexander Walker (10 July 1842 – 15 June 1903) was a Scottish cricketer. He played in two first-class matches in New Zealand for Canterbury from 1866 to 1870.

== See also ==
- List of Canterbury representative cricketers
