= Reg Gregory =

New Zealand cricketer

Personal information
- Full name: George Richard Gregory
- Born: 1 February 1892; Madeley, Shropshire, England
- Died: 17 August 1970 (aged 78); Christchurch, New Zealand

Domestic team information
- Years: Team
- 1922–23 to 1928–29: Canterbury

Career statistics
Competition	First-class
Matches	16
Runs scored	631
Batting average	22.53
100s/50s	0/5
Top score	67
Balls bowled	57
Wickets	1
Bowling average	52.00
5 wickets in innings	0
10 wickets in match	0
Best bowling	1/0
Catches/stumpings	5/–
- Source: Cricinfo, 28 December 2021

George Richard "Reg" Gregory (1 February 1892 – 17 August 1970) was a New Zealand cricketer. He played in sixteen first-class matches for Canterbury from 1922 to 1929.

Gregory was a solid opening batsman. He had his best Plunket Shield season in 1927–28, when he was Canterbury's leading scorer, with 247 runs at an average of 41.16, including his highest first-class score of 67 against Auckland, when Canterbury won by 11 runs. He was the highest scorer in Christchurch senior club cricket in 1926–27, with 806 runs at an average of 62.00.

For many years he managed Quill Morris liquor merchants in Christchurch.

== See also ==
- List of Canterbury representative cricketers
