= Ray Dunster =

New Zealand cricketer

Personal information
- Full name: Lawrence Raymond Dunster
- Born: 11 October 1908; Christchurch, New Zealand
- Died: 18 March 1968 (aged 59); Christchurch, New Zealand
- Source: Cricinfo, 15 October 2020

Ray Dunster (11 October 1908 – 18 March 1968) was a New Zealand cricketer. He played in two first-class matches for Canterbury in 1932/33.

== See also ==
- List of Canterbury representative cricketers
