= Don Stark (cricketer) =

New Zealand cricketer (1930–2019)

Personal information
- Full name: Donald William Stark
- Born: 2 May 1930; Christchurch, New Zealand
- Died: 23 January 2019 (aged 88); Christchurch, New Zealand
- Source: Cricinfo, 20 October 2020

Donald William Stark (2 May 1930 – 23 January 2019) was a New Zealand cricketer. He played in two first-class matches for Canterbury in 1953/54.

Stark died in Christchurch on 23 January 2019, at the age of 88.

== See also ==
- List of Canterbury representative cricketers
