= David Fulton (New Zealand cricketer) =

New Zealand cricketer (born 1983)

Personal information
- Born: 8 May 1983 (age 43); Christchurch, New Zealand
- Source: Cricinfo, 15 October 2020

David Fulton (born 8 May 1983) is a New Zealand cricketer. He played in two first-class matches for Canterbury in 2013.

== See also ==
- List of Canterbury representative cricketers
