= Thomas North (cricketer) =

New Zealand cricketer

Personal information
- Born: 1858; Crickhowell, Wales
- Died: 11 September 1942 (aged 83–84); Christchurch, New Zealand
- Source: Cricinfo, 17 October 2020

Thomas North (1858 – 11 September 1942) was a New Zealand cricketer. He played in eight first-class matches for Canterbury from 1893 to 1897.

== See also ==
- List of Canterbury representative cricketers
