= Brad Doody =

New Zealand cricketer (born 1973)

Personal information
- Born: 17 August 1973 (age 53); Rangiora, New Zealand
- Source: Cricinfo, 15 October 2020

Brad Doody (born 17 August 1973) is a New Zealand former cricketer. He played in 25 first-class and 53 List A matches for Canterbury from 1995 to 2002.

== See also ==
- List of Canterbury representative cricketers
