= Jack Reece =

New Zealand field hockey player and cricketer

Personal information
- Full name: Albert Jack Reece
- Born: 1927; Christchurch, New Zealand
- Died: 10 September 1966 (aged 38–39); Christchurch, New Zealand
- Source: Cricinfo, 20 October 2020

Albert Jack Reece (1927 – 10 September 1966) was a New Zealand hockey player and cricketer, and umpire at both sports.

Reece played hockey for Canterbury from 1946 to 1956, and represented New Zealand in 1948. He later became a hockey umpire, officiating in a Test between New Zealand and Pakistan in 1958.

Reece played in one first-class match for Canterbury in 1947/48. He umpired eight first-class matches, all of them at Lancaster Park, Christchurch, between 1959 and 1962.

Illness deprived him of his sight in the early 1960s, and he died in September 1966, aged 39.

== See also ==
- List of Canterbury representative cricketers
