= Stephen Bateman =

New Zealand cricketer (born 1958)

Stephen Noel Bateman (born 6 January 1958 in Christchurch) is a former New Zealand cricketer who played for the Canterbury Wizards. He is the cousin of Glenn Bateman.
