= Henry Ogier =

New Zealand cricketer

Personal information
- Born: 4 December 1864; Christchurch, New Zealand
- Died: 29 November 1954 (aged 89); Wanganui, New Zealand
- Source: Cricinfo, 20 October 2020

Henry Ogier (4 December 1864 – 29 November 1954) was a New Zealand cricketer. He played in five first-class matches for Canterbury from 1889 to 1892.

== See also ==
- List of Canterbury representative cricketers
