= John Mackle =

New Zealand cricketer

Personal information
- Born: 15 August 1953; Temuka, New Zealand
- Died: 27 June 2010 (aged 56); Christchurch, New Zealand
- Source: Cricinfo, 17 October 2020

John Mackle (15 August 1953 – 27 June 2010) was a New Zealand cricketer. He played in ten first-class and two List A matches for Canterbury from 1980 to 1982.

== See also ==
- List of Canterbury representative cricketers
