= Lindsay Thorn (cricketer) =

New Zealand cricketer (born 1952)

Personal information
- Born: 1 March 1952 (age 74); Motueka, New Zealand
- Source: Cricinfo, 20 October 2020

Lindsay Thorn (born 1 March 1952) is a New Zealand cricketer. He played in seven first-class matches for Canterbury from 1978 and 1980.

== See also ==
- List of Canterbury representative cricketers
