= Francis Malet =

New Zealand cricketer

Personal information
- Born: 26 March 1855; Bengal, India
- Source: Cricinfo, 17 October 2020

Francis Malet (born 26 March 1855, date of death unknown) was a New Zealand cricketer. He played in six first-class matches for Canterbury in 1883/84.

== See also ==
- List of Canterbury representative cricketers
