= Colin Stevens (cricketer) =

New Zealand cricketer (1943–2019)

Personal information
- Full name: Colin James Stevens
- Born: 17 October 1943; Christchurch, New Zealand
- Died: 5 August 2019 (aged 75); Hamilton, Waikato, New Zealand
- Batting: Right-handed

Domestic team information
- Years: Team
- 1966/67–1967/68: Canterbury
- Source: Cricinfo, 20 October 2020

Colin James Stevens (17 October 1943 – 5 August 2019) was a New Zealand cricketer. He played in three first-class matches for Canterbury from 1966 to 1967.

Stevens died on 5 August 2019, at the age of 75.

== See also ==
- List of Canterbury representative cricketers
