= Gary Walklin =

New Zealand cricketer (born 1944)

Personal information
- Born: 2 February 1944 (age 82); Christchurch, New Zealand
- Source: Cricinfo, 22 October 2020

Gary Walklin (born 2 February 1944) is a New Zealand cricketer. He played in one List A match for Canterbury in 1973/74.

== See also ==
- List of Canterbury representative cricketers
