= Ken McNicholl =

New Zealand cricketer

Personal information
- Born: 27 November 1930; Prebbleton, New Zealand
- Died: 23 November 1997 (aged 66); Christchurch, New Zealand
- Source: Cricinfo, 17 October 2020

Ken McNicholl (27 November 1930 – 23 November 1997) was a New Zealand cricketer. He played in six first-class matches for Canterbury from 1952 to 1957.

== See also ==
- List of Canterbury representative cricketers
