= Michael Sharpe (cricketer) =

New Zealand cricketer (born 1966)

Personal information
- Born: 8 October 1966 (age 60); Dannevirke, New Zealand
- Source: Cricinfo, 20 October 2020

Michael Sharpe (born 8 October 1966) is a New Zealand cricketer. He played in 21 first-class and 34 List A matches for Canterbury from 1990 to 1997.

== See also ==
- List of Canterbury representative cricketers
