= William Cooke (cricketer) =

New Zealand cricketer

Personal information
- Born: 18 March 1868; Christchurch, New Zealand
- Died: 21 November 1954 (aged 86); Auckland, New Zealand
- Source: Cricinfo, 15 October 2020

William Cooke (18 March 1868 – 21 November 1954) was a New Zealand cricketer. He played in two first-class matches for Canterbury in 1891/92.

== See also ==
- List of Canterbury representative cricketers
