= Rodolph Mathias =

New Zealand cricketer

Personal information
- Born: 5 June 1861; Christchurch, New Zealand
- Died: 22 October 1907 (aged 46); Napier, New Zealand
- Source: Cricinfo, 17 October 2020

Rodolph Mathias (5 June 1861 – 22 October 1907) was a New Zealand cricketer. He played in six first-class matches for Canterbury from 1888 to 1894.

== See also ==
- List of Canterbury representative cricketers
