= Ernest Caygill =

New Zealand cricketer

Personal information
- Full name: Ernest Robson Caygill
- Born: 13 December 1886; Christchurch, New Zealand
- Died: 21 March 1971 (aged 84); Christchurch, New Zealand
- Source: Cricinfo, 15 October 2020

Ernest Robson Caygill (13 December 1886 – 21 March 1971) was a New Zealand cricketer. He played in eleven first-class matches for Canterbury from 1910 to 1914.

In 1953, Caygill was awarded the Queen Elizabeth II Coronation Medal.

== See also ==
- List of Canterbury representative cricketers
