= Jim Dawson (cricketer) =

New Zealand cricketer

Personal information
- Full name: James Hurren Martin Dawson
- Born: 28 October 1937 (age 89); Christchurch, New Zealand
- Source: Cricinfo, 15 October 2020

James Hurren Martin Dawson (born 28 October 1937) is a New Zealand cricketer. He played in eleven first-class matches for Canterbury from 1957 and 1963.

== See also ==
- List of Canterbury representative cricketers
