= Charles Broad (Canterbury cricketer) =

New Zealand cricketer and veterinarian (1945–2019)

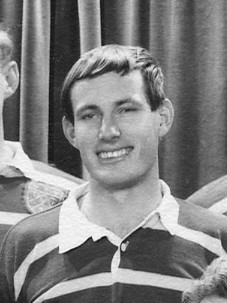
- Broad in 1966

Personal information
- Full name: Charles Lionel Broad
- Born: 1 December 1945; Epsom, England
- Died: 4 September 2019 (aged 73); Burwood, Christchurch, New Zealand
- Batting: Right-handed
- Bowling: Right-arm off-spin

Domestic team information
- Years: Team
- 1966–67: Canterbury

Career statistics
Competition	FC
Matches	3
Runs scored	102
Batting average	20.40
100s/50s	0/0
Top score	43
Balls bowled	362
Wickets	8
Bowling average	18.37
5 wickets in innings	1
10 wickets in match	0
Best bowling	5/61
Catches/stumpings	0/–
- Source: Cricinfo, 6 September 2022

Charles Lionel Broad (1 December 1945 – 4 September 2019) was a New Zealand cricketer and veterinarian.

Broad was born in England in 1945, and moved to New Zealand with his family in 1947. A middle-order batsman and off-spin bowler, he played for the Buller cricket team when he was 16 and living in Westport, and later represented New Zealand Universities while studying at Lincoln College and Massey University. He played in three first-class matches for Canterbury in 1966/67. In his second Plunket Shield match he scored 27 and 43 and took 2 for 34 and 5 for 61 against Auckland.

Broad decided to concentrate on his veterinary career, and played no first-class cricket after the age of 21. He established the Animal & Bird Hospital in Christchurch in 1977.

== See also ==
- List of Canterbury representative cricketers
