= Brian Sampson (cricketer) =

New Zealand cricketer (born 1945)

- Full name: Brian Victor Sampson
- Born: 30 July 1945 Ashburton, New Zealand
- Died: 29 April 2026 (aged 80)

Rugby union career
- Position: Wing
Provincial / State sides
Years	Team	Apps	(Points)
1964–1970	Mid Canterbury	57	(123)
1965–1968	Hanan Shield Unions	3	(0)
1969	South Island	1	(0)
Coaching career
- Years: Team
- 1977–1983: Mid Canterbury
- Cricket career

Cricket information
- Batting: Right-handed
- Bowling: Right-arm off-break and medium pace

Domestic team information
- Years: Team
- 1969/70: Canterbury

Career statistics
Competition	First-class
Matches	2
Runs scored	40
Batting average	20.00
100s/50s	0/0
Top score	24*
Balls bowled	32
Wickets	0
Bowling average	–
5 wickets in innings	0
10 wickets in match	0
Best bowling	0/15
Catches/stumpings	1/–
- Source: Cricinfo, 20 October 2020

Brian Victor Sampson (30 July 1945 – 29 April 2026) was a New Zealand cricketer, and rugby union player and coach.

== Early life and family ==
Sampson was born in Ashburton on 30 July 1945, the third son of Andrew David and Mary Luwena Sampson. In August 1964, he became engaged to Janice Margaret Kerr, and the couple subsequently married.

== Cricket career ==
Sampson played in two first-class cricket matches for Canterbury in 1969/70. He was a right-handed batsman, and scored a total of 40 runs in those two games, averaging 20.00 with a high score of 24 not out. He was also a right-arm off-break and medium pace bowler, and recorded first-class bowling figures of 0–15 from 32 deliveries.

Sampson also played for Ashburton County from 1960/61 to 1979/80, including in Hawke Cup fixtures between 1964/65 and 1979/80.

== Rugby union career ==
A winger, Sampson was a member of the Allenton Rugby Football Club in Ashburton. He played 57 matches for Mid Canterbury between 1964 and 1970, scoring 41 tries. He also made three appearances for a combined Hanan Shield unions (Mid Canterbury / South Canterbury / North Otago) team, in 1965 and 1968, and played one match for the South Island in 1969.

Sampson later coached the Mid Canterbury team from 1977 to 1983. During Sampson's tenure as coach, Mid Canterbury twice won the National Provincial Championship second division South Island title, in 1980 and 1983.

== Death ==
Sampson died on 29 April 2026, at the age of 80.

== See also ==
- List of Canterbury representative cricketers
