= Bryan Ritchie =

New Zealand cricketer (born 1954)

Personal information
- Born: 6 December 1954 (age 71); Christchurch, New Zealand
- Source: Cricinfo, 20 October 2020

Bryan Ritchie (born 6 December 1954) is a New Zealand cricketer. He played in seventeen first-class and seven List A matches for Canterbury from 1979 to 1982.

== See also ==
- List of Canterbury representative cricketers
