= Henry Waine =

New Zealand cricketer

Personal information
- Full name: Henry Colin Waine
- Born: 19 January 1913; Christchurch, New Zealand
- Died: 3 September 1995 (aged 82); New Zealand
- Source: Cricinfo, 22 October 2020

Henry Colin Waine (19 January 1913 – 3 September 1995) was a New Zealand cricketer. He played in three first-class matches for Canterbury in 1944/45.

== See also ==
- List of Canterbury representative cricketers
