= Bob Powell (cricketer) =

New Zealand cricketer

Personal information
- Full name: Robert Frederick James Powell
- Born: 27 April 1902; Sydney, Australia
- Died: 25 February 1976 (aged 73); Christchurch, New Zealand
- Source: Cricinfo, 20 October 2020

Bob Powell (27 April 1902 – 25 February 1976) was a New Zealand cricketer. He played in two first-class match for Canterbury in 1922/23.

== See also ==
- List of Canterbury representative cricketers
