= Alfred Sheath =

English cricketer

Personal information
- Born: 15 June 1859; Aston, England
- Died: 1939 (aged 79–80); Hackney, England
- Source: Cricinfo, 20 October 2020

Alfred Sheath (15 June 1859 – 1939) was an English cricketer. He played in one first-class match in New Zealand for Canterbury in 1879/80.

== See also ==
- List of Canterbury representative cricketers
