= Russell Hortin =

New Zealand cricketer (born 1940)

Personal information
- Born: 10 October 1940 (age 86); Ashburton, New Zealand
- Source: Cricinfo, 17 October 2020

Russell Hortin (born 10 October 1940) is a New Zealand cricketer. He played in two first-class matches for Canterbury in 1963–64.

== See also ==
- List of Canterbury representative cricketers
