= Arthur Chapman (New Zealand cricketer) =

New Zealand cricketer

Personal information
- Born: 2 June 1861; Christchurch, New Zealand
- Died: 13 April 1950 (aged 88); Christchurch, New Zealand
- Source: Cricinfo, 15 October 2020

Arthur Chapman (2 June 1861 – 13 April 1950) was a New Zealand cricketer. He played in six first-class matches for Canterbury from 1881 to 1892.

== See also ==
- List of Canterbury representative cricketers
