= Paul Rutledge =

New Zealand cricketer (born 1962)

Personal information
- Born: 30 July 1962 (age 64); Christchurch, New Zealand
- Source: Cricinfo, 20 October 2020

Paul Rutledge (born 30 July 1962) is a New Zealand cricketer. He played in five first-class and two List A matches for Canterbury in 1982/83.

== See also ==
- List of Canterbury representative cricketers
