= Harold Mathias =

New Zealand cricketer

Personal information
- Born: 1864; Christchurch, New Zealand
- Died: 8 April 1954 (aged 89–90); Lawrence, New Zealand
- Source: Cricinfo, 17 October 2020

Harold Mathias (1864 – 8 April 1954) was a New Zealand cricketer. He played in two first-class matches for Canterbury from 1883 to 1887.

== See also ==
- List of Canterbury representative cricketers
