= Ken Taylor (New Zealand cricketer) =

New Zealand cricketer (born 1953)

Personal information
- Born: 10 November 1953 (age 73); Lincoln, New Zealand
- Source: Cricinfo, 20 October 2020

Ken Taylor (born 10 November 1953) is a New Zealand former cricketer. He played in one first-class and two List A matches for Canterbury from 1983 to 1985.

== See also ==
- List of Canterbury representative cricketers
