= Frank Newton (cricketer) =

New Zealand cricketer

Personal information
- Born: 2 January 1909
- Died: 17 September 1973 (aged 64); Auckland, New Zealand
- Source: Cricinfo, 17 October 2020

Frank Newton (2 January 1909 – 17 September 1973) was a New Zealand cricketer. He played in one first-class match for Canterbury in 1938/39.

== See also ==
- List of Canterbury representative cricketers
