= Bob Webb (cricketer) =

New Zealand cricketer

Personal information
- Born: 13 September 1917; Christchurch, New Zealand
- Died: 8 May 1989 (aged 71); Christchurch, New Zealand
- Source: Cricinfo, 22 October 2020

Bob Webb (13 September 1917 – 8 May 1989) was a New Zealand cricketer. He played in twelve first-class matches for Canterbury from 1937 to 1950.

== See also ==
- List of Canterbury representative cricketers
