= Cecil Carston =

New Zealand cricketer

Personal information
- Born: 19 April 1927; Christchurch, New Zealand
- Died: 19 October 2014 (aged 87); Christchurch, New Zealand
- Source: Cricinfo, 15 October 2020

Cecil Carston (19 April 1927 – 19 October 2014) was a New Zealand cricketer. He played in two first-class matches for Canterbury in 1946/47.

== See also ==
- List of Canterbury representative cricketers
