= Peter Wallace (cricketer) =

New Zealand cricketer (born 1946)

Personal information
- Born: 23 October 1946 (age 80); Christchurch, New Zealand
- Source: Cricinfo, 22 October 2020

Peter Wallace (born 23 October 1946) is a New Zealand cricketer. He played in five first-class matches for Canterbury in 1973/74.

== See also ==
- List of Canterbury representative cricketers
