= Kit Chambers =

New Zealand cricketer (born 1949)

Personal information
- Born: 22 April 1949 (age 77); Christchurch, New Zealand
- Source: Cricinfo, 15 October 2020

Kit Chambers (born 22 April 1949) is a New Zealand cricketer. He played in one first-class match for Canterbury in 1973–74.

== See also ==
- List of Canterbury representative cricketers
