= Brendon Donkers =

New Zealand cricketer (born 1976)

Personal information
- Born: 25 July 1976 (age 50); Hokitika, New Zealand
- Source: Cricinfo, 15 October 2020

Brendon Donkers (born 25 July 1976) is a New Zealand cricketer. He played in eight first-class matches for Canterbury from 2002 to 2004.

== See also ==
- List of Canterbury representative cricketers
