= Murray Sharp =

New Zealand cricketer

Personal information
- Full name: Thomas Murray Sharp
- Born: 23 January 1916; Gisborne, New Zealand
- Died: 11 May 1999 (aged 83); Gisborne, New Zealand
- Source: Cricinfo, 20 October 2020

Murray Sharp (23 January 1916 – 11 May 1999) was a New Zealand cricketer. He played in four first-class matches for Canterbury from 1934 to 1946.

== See also ==
- List of Canterbury representative cricketers
