= Ernest Frankish =

New Zealand cricketer

Personal information
- Born: 4 July 1876; Christchurch, New Zealand
- Died: 22 January 1962 (aged 85); Raumati Beach, New Zealand
- Source: Cricinfo, 15 October 2020

Ernest Frankish (4 July 1876 – 22 January 1962) was a New Zealand cricketer. He played in five first-class matches for Canterbury from 1903 to 1906.

== See also ==
- List of Canterbury representative cricketers
