= Kevin Collins (cricketer) =

New Zealand cricketer (born 1954)

Personal information
- Born: 6 July 1954 (age 72); Christchurch, New Zealand
- Source: Cricinfo, 15 October 2020

Kevin Collins (born 6 July 1954) is a New Zealand cricketer. He played in one first-class and two List A matches for Canterbury from 1976 to 1979.

== See also ==
- List of Canterbury representative cricketers
