= Ernest Gasson (cricketer, born 1907) =

New Zealand cricketer

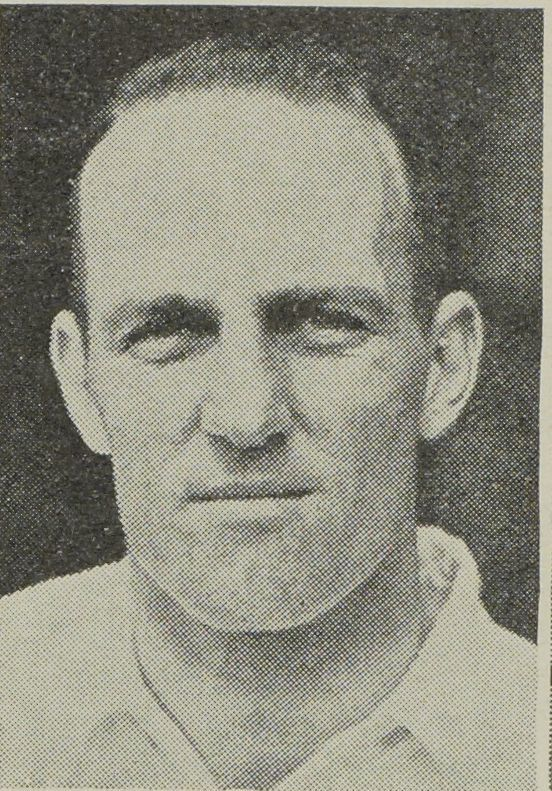

Personal information
- Born: 11 November 1907; Christchurch, New Zealand
- Died: 7 September 1942 (aged 34); El Alamein, Egypt
- Source: Cricinfo, 17 October 2020

Ernest Gasson (11 November 1907 – 7 September 1942) was a New Zealand cricketer. He played in three first-class matches for Canterbury in 1937/38. He was killed in action during World War II.

== See also ==
- List of Canterbury representative cricketers
- Ernest Gasson (1887) (father)
