= Arthur Longden =

New Zealand cricketer

Personal information
- Born: 10 November 1856; Christchurch, New Zealand
- Died: 1 July 1924 (aged 67); Christchurch, New Zealand

Domestic team information
- Years: Team
- 1883/84–1885/86: Canterbury
- Source: Cricinfo, 17 October 2020

Arthur Longden (11 November 1856 – 1 July 1924) was a New Zealand cricketer. He played in six first-class matches for Canterbury between the 1883–84 season and 1885–86.

Longden was born at Christchurch in 1856 but grew up in England where he was educated at Clifton College. He returned to New Zealand where his family owned a sheep station at Mount Torlesse in Canterbury. A "prominent" cricketer in Christchurch, where he played for the United Canterbury club, and South Canterbury and Otago, Longden played six first-class matches for the representative team in the 1880s. He scored a total of 120 runs, including scores of 42 on debut against Wellington and 51 against a touring Tasmania team, both in 1883–84.

Soon after returning to New Zealand, Longden left the family farm and joined the Union Bank of Australia. He served as the bank's sub-manager at Christchurch and its manager at Wellington, before moving to work in Australia. He was sub-manager at Sydney from 1899 to 1908 before becoming manager at Ballarat in Victoria and later at Launceston in Tasmania where he worked until his retirement in 1919.

Longden was married and had two daughters. He spent his retirement at Christchurch where he died following a short illness in 1924 at the age of 67. An obituary was published in the 1925 edition of Wisden Cricketers' Almanack.
