= Vincent James =

New Zealand cricketer

Personal information
- Born: 24 August 1915; Napoleons, Victoria, Australia
- Source: Cricinfo, 17 October 2020

Vincent James (born 24 August 1915, date of death unknown) was a New Zealand cricketer. He played in six first-class matches for Canterbury from 1939 to 1945.
