= Henry Gunthorp =

New Zealand cricketer

Personal information
- Born: 29 April 1871; Marylebone, London, England
- Died: 7 October 1962 (aged 91); Balclutha, New Zealand

Domestic team information
- Years: Team
- 1895/96: Canterbury
- 1902/03: Otago
- Source: CricInfo, 13 May 2016

Henry Gunthorp (29 April 1871 – 7 October 1962) was a New Zealand cricketer. He played first-class cricket for Canterbury during the 1895–96 season and Otago in 1902–03.

Gunthorp was born in London in 1871. Professionally he was a dentist.
