= Craig Thiele =

New Zealand cricketer (born 1953)

Personal information
- Full name: Craig Harvey Thiele
- Born: 14 November 1953 (age 72); Nelson, New Zealand
- Batting: Right-handed
- Bowling: Right-arm medium-fast

Domestic team information
- Years: Team
- 1980/81–1985/86: Canterbury

Career statistics
Competition	First-class	List A
Matches	34	25
Runs scored	260	34
Batting average	10.40	3.09
100s/50s	0/0	0/0
Top score	49	7*
Balls bowled	5,641	1197
Wickets	107	39
Bowling average	26.93	18.51
5 wickets in innings	3	0
10 wickets in match	0	0
Best bowling	6/45	4/37
Catches/stumpings	11/–	5/–
- Source: Cricinfo, 26 December 2017

Craig Harvey Thiele (born 14 November 1953) is a former New Zealand cricketer. He has played 34 first-class cricket matches and 25 List A matches for Canterbury cricket team between 1980 and 1987.
