= Phil D'Auvergne =

New Zealand cricketer (born 1950)

Personal information
- Full name: Philip Godfrey D'Auvergne
- Born: 23 June 1950 (age 76); Invercargill, New Zealand

Domestic team information
- Years: Team
- 1969/70–1978/79: Canterbury
- Source: Cricinfo, 15 October 2020

Philip Godfrey D'Auvergne (born 23 June 1950) is a former New Zealand cricketer. He played in five first-class matches for Canterbury from 1969 to 1979.

A middle-order batsman and left-arm spin bowler, D'Auvergne's made his highest first-class score in Canterbury's match against Central Districts in the last match of the 1973–74 Plunket Shield. His 87 in the first innings was the highest score on either side in the match.

D'Auvergne, who worked as a schoolteacher, had a long career for South Canterbury, captaining the team several times and playing 93 matches and scoring 2,702 runs and taking 249 wickets. He played Hawke Cup cricket for South Canterbury from 1967–68 to 1993–94.
