= Edwin Palmer (cricketer) =

New Zealand cricketer

Personal information
- Full name: Edwin Vidal Palmer
- Born: 23 May 1869; Christchurch, New Zealand
- Died: 28 April 1917 (aged 47); Dunedin, New Zealand
- Bowling: Left-arm fast-medium

Domestic team information
- Years: Team
- 1892–93 to 1893–94: Canterbury

Career statistics
Competition	First-class
Matches	4
Runs scored	38
Batting average	9.50
100s/50s	0/0
Top score	19
Balls bowled	391
Wickets	13
Bowling average	12.00
5 wickets in innings	1
10 wickets in match	0
Best bowling	5/32
Catches/stumpings	7/0
- Source: Cricinfo, 22 May 2017

Edwin Vidal Palmer (23 May 1869 – 28 April 1917) was a New Zealand cricketer, sheep farmer, and local politician.

== Life and career ==
Palmer was born in Christchurch and educated at Christ's College, Christchurch, and Jesus College, Cambridge, where he completed a BA degree.

A left-arm pace bowler, Palmer played cricket for Canterbury in the 1892–93 and 1893–94 seasons. On his first-class debut he took 3 for 22 and 5 for 32 to help Canterbury to a two-wicket victory over Otago. The next season, when a selected player had to withdraw, he played in New Zealand's first representative first-class match, against New South Wales in Christchurch.

On 3 June 1902 he married Edith Tabart at St Mark's Church, Opawa, Christchurch. They bought a sheep farm at Whatatutu, north of Gisborne, and moved there. He served as a member of Waikohu County Council for several years.

Palmer had been in poor health for some time before his death, and travelled to Dunedin for an operation, but it was unsuccessful, and he died at the age of 47. He and Edith had a daughter, Peggy.
