= John Calder (cricketer) =

New Zealand cricketer

Personal information
- Born: 5 June 1951; Waimate, New Zealand
- Died: 29 September 2010 (aged 59)
- Source: Cricinfo, 15 October 2020

John Calder (5 June 1951 – 29 September 2010) was a New Zealand cricketer. He played in one first-class and two List A matches for Canterbury from 1971 to 1978.

== See also ==
- List of Canterbury representative cricketers
