= Jack Young (New Zealand cricketer) =

New Zealand cricketer

Personal information
- Full name: John Gordon Young
- Born: 19 February 1901; Christchurch, New Zealand
- Died: 20 March 1949 (aged 48); Dunedin, New Zealand
- Batting: Right-handed

Domestic team information
- Years: Team
- 1921-22 to 1923-24: Canterbury

Career statistics
Competition	First-class
Matches	6
Runs scored	154
Batting average	17.11
100s/50s	0/0
Top score	35
Balls bowled	0
Wickets	–
Bowling average	–
5 wickets in innings	–
10 wickets in match	–
Best bowling	–
Catches/stumpings	1/0
- Source: CricketArchive, 11 July 2020

John Gordon Young (19 February 1901 – 20 March 1949) was a New Zealand cricketer who played first-class cricket for Canterbury from 1922 to 1924.

== Career ==
A batsman, Young made his highest first-class score in his first match, when he scored 35 opening in the second innings against Auckland in 1921–22. In a non-first-class match for Canterbury B against Hawke's Bay in January 1920 he scored 238 not out in about 280 minutes. He was later an umpire, standing in three first-class matches in the 1930s and 1940s.

He and his wife Violet had one son. Jack died in March 1949.
