= John Bruges =

New Zealand cricketer

Personal information
- Full name: John Stanley Beetham Bruges
- Born: 18 May 1889; Christchurch, New Zealand
- Died: 29 December 1948 (aged 59); Christchurch, New Zealand
- Batting: Right-handed
- Role: Batsman

Domestic team information
- Years: Team
- 1908/09: Canterbury
- 1913/14–1914/15: Otago
- Source: CricInfo, 6 May 2016

John Stanley Beetham Bruges (18 May 1889 – 29 December 1948) was a New Zealand cricketer. He played first-class cricket for Canterbury and Otago between the 1908–09 and 1914–15 seasons.

Bruges was bird at Christchurch and educated at Christ's College in the city from 1898 to 1907. He served overseas with the New Zealand forces in World War I. He died at Christchurch on 29 December 1948, and was buried at Sydenham Cemetery.
