= Edwin Fowler =

Australian cricketer

Personal information
- Born: 1841; Islington, London, England
- Died: 31 May 1909 (aged 67–68); Melbourne, Australia

Domestic team information
- Years: Team
- 1865: Victoria
- 1868-69 to 1881-82: Canterbury
- Source: Cricinfo, 1 April 2019

Edwin Fowler (1841 – 31 May 1909) was an Australian cricketer. He played one first-class cricket match for Victoria in 1865 and 16 for Canterbury in New Zealand between 1869 and 1882.

== See also ==
- List of Victoria first-class cricketers
