= Leslie Watson (cricketer) =

New Zealand cricketer

Personal information
- Full name: Leslie Thomas Watson
- Born: 17 August 1956; Christchurch, New Zealand
- Died: 29 May 2024 (aged 67)
- Batting: Right-handed
- Bowling: Right-arm medium

Domestic team information
- Years: Team
- 1978–79: Canterbury
- Source: Cricinfo, 22 October 2020

Leslie Thomas Watson (17 August 1956 – 29 May 2024) was a New Zealand cricketer. He played in one first-class and three List A matches for Canterbury in 1978/79.

Watson died on 29 May 2024, at the age of 67, following a long battle with Alzheimer's disease.

== See also ==
- List of Canterbury representative cricketers
