= William Howell (cricketer, born 1883) =

New Zealand cricketer

Personal information
- Full name: William Boyne Howell
- Born: 13 July 1883; Christchurch, New Zealand
- Died: 18 February 1960 (aged 76); Christchurch, New Zealand
- Batting: Right-handed
- Bowling: Left-arm medium-pace

Domestic team information
- Years: Team
- 1902-03 to 1918-19: Canterbury

Career statistics
Competition	First-class
Matches	11
Runs scored	130
Batting average	9.28
100s/50s	0/0
Top score	20 not out
Balls bowled	1630
Wickets	47
Bowling average	15.51
5 wickets in innings	2
10 wickets in match	1
Best bowling	7/32
Catches/stumpings	6/0
- Source: Cricinfo, 12 December 2017

William Boyne Howell (13 July 1883 – 18 February 1960) was a New Zealand cricketer who played first-class cricket for Canterbury from 1902 to 1919.

Howell was a left-arm medium pace bowler and right-handed tail-end batsman. His best bowling figures were 6 for 50 and 7 for 32 in Canterbury's victory over Wellington in 1902–03. He also represented South Island in two matches.

Howell's first wife died in April 1912. He died in Christchurch in February 1960, aged 76, leaving a widow, two daughters and a son.
