= Raymond Jones (cricketer) =

New Zealand cricketer (born 1958)

Personal information
- Full name: Raymond Peter Jones
- Born: 12 October 1958 (age 67); Christchurch, Canterbury, New Zealand
- Batting: Left-handed
- Bowling: Right-arm off break

Domestic team information
- Years: Team
- 1980/81: Canterbury
- 1982/83: Otago
- 1983/84–1984/85: Canterbury
- Source: ESPNcricinfo, 15 May 2016

Raymond Peter Jones (born 12 October 1958) is a New Zealand former cricketer. He played first-class and List A cricket for Canterbury and Otago between the 1980–81 season and 1984–85.

Jones was born at Christchurch in 1958 and was educated at Shirley Boys' High School in the city. After playing age group and B team cricket for Canterbury from the 1978–79 season onwards, he made his senior provincial debut for the side in a December 1980 fixture against the new Zealand under-23 side at Lancaster Park.

Initially Jones did not get another opportunity in the representative side and moved to Otago where he played one first-class and two List A matches during the 1982–83 season. He moved back to Canterbury the following season, playing another four first-class and two List A matches over the following two seasons. Often playing as an opening batsman, Jones made a total of 199 first-class runs, with a highest score of 56, his only representative half-century.
