= Charles Treweek =

New Zealand cricketer

Personal information
- Born: 12 March 1859; Kai Iwi, Whanganui, New Zealand
- Died: 17 February 1942 (aged 82); New Plymouth, New Zealand

Domestic team information
- Years: Team
- 1889/90–1894/95: Canterbury
- Source: Cricinfo, 20 October 2020

Charles Treweek (12 March 1859 – 17 February 1942) was a New Zealand civil servant and cricketer. He played in two first-class matches for Canterbury, one in 1889–90 and the other in 1894–95.

Treweek was born at Kai Iwi near Whanganui in 1859. His parents had been some of the earliest settlers of the Taranaki Region, arriving in New Zealand on the Timandra in 1842, and Treweek was the youngest of 12 children. Educated at Whanganui, he worked in a legal office after leaving school before joining the Telegraph Department in 1875.

Working initially at Wellington, Treweek became a skilled telegraph operator. He later worked at Blenheim and Christchurch before being ported to chief telegraph clerk at Nelson. He moved to be senior check clerk and later assistant-superintendent at Wellington, before being promoted to superintendent of telegraphs at Auckland in 1920 where he worked until he retired in 1921. Considered "one of the most brilliant telegraphists of his day", he sent 24,500 words in 19 hours following the grounding of the Taiaroa in 1886, one of the "most notable feats in New Zealand telegraphy".

Treweek was a noted cricketer in Christchurch, playing in telegraph office matches as well as making two first-class appearances for the Canterbury representative side. He made his representative debut against Otago in March 1890, taking three wickets but recording a pair. His other first-class match was against the touring Fijian side in 1894–95; Treweek did not take a wicket and was out for a duck in his only innings of the match. As well as cricket, Treweek was a "champion rifle shot" and played tennis and golf. He was a member of the committee of a number of gold clubs throughout his life.

In retirement Treweek lived at Epsom in Auckland until the death of his wife in 1935. He later moved to New Plymouth where he died in 1942 aged 82. He was survived by his two sons.
