= Frederick Labatt =

New Zealand cricketer

Personal information
- Born: 1861; Moneymore, Ireland
- Died: 1 August 1947 (aged 85–86); Christchurch, New Zealand
- Source: Cricinfo, 17 October 2020

Frederick Labatt (1861 – 1 August 1947) was a New Zealand cricketer. He played in one first-class match for Canterbury in 1891/92.
