= Simon Wilson (cricketer) =

New Zealand cricketer (born 1970)

Personal information
- Born: 3 September 1970 (age 56); Blenheim, New Zealand
- Source: Cricinfo, 22 October 2020

Simon Wilson (born 3 September 1970) is a New Zealand cricketer. He played in 33 first-class and 29 List A matches for Canterbury and Central Districts from 1990 to 1995.
