= Charles Fearon =

New Zealand cricketer

Personal information
- Full name: Charles Devey Fearon
- Born: 26 April 1846; Hunstanton, Norfolk, England
- Died: 21 October 1876 (aged 30); Nelson, New Zealand

Domestic team information
- Years: Team
- 1965/66: Canterbury
- Source: Cricinfo, 15 October 2020

Charles Devey Fearon (26 April 1846 – 21 October 1876) was a New Zealand cricketer. He played in one first-class match for Canterbury during the 1865–66 season.

Fearon was born at Hunstanton in Norfolk in 1846, the eldest son of the Reverend William Fearon, the vicar of Hunstanton and rector of Ringstead. He was educated at Marlborough College in England before the family moved to New Zealand where he attended Christ's College in Christchurch.

A club cricketer who played for the United Canterbury club in Christchurch―at the time the only organised cricket club in Canterbury―Fearon played his only first-class match during the 1865–66 season. The fixture against Otago at South Dunedin Recreation Ground is the third match played in New Zealand to be awarded first-class status. Fearon scored six runs, making five not out in Canterbury's first innings batting at the end of the order, before opening the batting in the second innings and scoring a single. Described as "a very useful man in batting, bowling or fielding", by the end of the following season Fearon had left Canterbury and played no more first-class cricket.

Fearon worked as a telegraph operator and post master, including at Roxburgh and Westport. He died at Nelson in 1876 at the age of 30, his wife inheriting his estate.
