= Brian Haworth =

New Zealand cricketer

Personal information
- Full name: Brian Ashley Haworth
- Born: 3 February 1932; Christchurch, New Zealand
- Died: 16 August 2024 (aged 92); Adelaide, South Australia, Australia
- Batting: Right-handed

Domestic team information
- Years: Team
- 1953/54–1958/59: Canterbury

Career statistics
Competition	First-class
Matches	18
Runs scored	587
Batting average	20.24
100s/50s	1/2
Top score	123
Balls bowled	18
Wickets	1
Bowling average	14.00
5 wickets in innings	0
10 wickets in match	0
Best bowling	1/3
Catches/stumpings	6/–
- Source: Cricinfo, 18 November 2025

Brian Ashley Haworth (3 February 1932 – 16 August 2024) was a New Zealand cricketer. He played in 18 first-class matches for Canterbury between 1953 and 1959.

Haworth was born in Christchurch and educated at West Christchurch High School. Although he was short, he was a successful middle-order batsman and one of the best cover fieldsmen in New Zealand. His only first-class century came in Canterbury's victory over Wellington in the 1955–56 Plunket Shield, when he scored 123. He and Sammy Guillen added 180 in 135 minutes for the sixth wicket, of which Guillen made 118. The partnership was a sixth-wicket record for Canterbury until 1988–89. Later that season he scored 59 against the touring West Indies team, earning praise from the West Indian captain Denis Atkinson, who said, "I liked that short fellow, who was No. 3 for Canterbury and twelfth man in the Second Test. There was a man with courage and determination." In a senior club match for East Christchurch in 1955–56, he bowled an over in which five wickets fell but he did not take a hat trick: a run out, a dot ball, a leg before wicket, a caught, another run out, and another caught.

Haworth married Jennifer Johnston, who also played cricket for Canterbury in the 1950s.
