= Francis Reeder =

New Zealand cricketer (1851–1908)

Francis James Reeder (18 April 1851 – 28 July 1908) was an English-born New Zealand cricketer who played for Canterbury.

Reeder made a single first-class appearance for the team, during the 1873–74 season, against Otago. The match was played on 12 and 13 January 1874 at the South Dunedin Recreation Ground in Dunedin, New Zealand. From the tailend, he scored two runs in the first innings in which he batted, and zero not out in the second.

Reeder took figures of 0-9 during the match, which Otago lost by an innings margin.
