= John Ruston (cricketer) =

New Zealand cricketer

Personal information
- Born: 4 March 1941; Wellington, New Zealand
- Died: 30 April 2006 (aged 65); Brisbane, Australia
- Source: Cricinfo, 20 October 2020

John Ruston (4 March 1941 – 30 April 2006) was a New Zealand cricketer. He played in two first-class matches for Canterbury in 1962/63.

== See also ==
- List of Canterbury representative cricketers
