= Robbie Newton =

New Zealand cricketer (born 1952)

Personal information
- Born: 30 May 1952 (age 74); Lincoln, New Zealand
- Source: Cricinfo, 17 October 2020

Robbie Newton (born 30 May 1952) is a New Zealand former cricketer. He played in eleven first-class and five List A matches for Canterbury and Wellington from 1973 to 1975.
