= Stephen Lester =

New Zealand cricketer

Personal information
- Full name: Stephen Garland Lester
- Born: 18 March 1906; Amberley, North Canterbury, New Zealand
- Died: 24 October 1971 (aged 65); Christchurch, New Zealand
- Batting: Right-handed
- Bowling: Right-arm medium

Domestic team information
- Years: Team
- 1929/30–1935/36: Canterbury

Career statistics
Competition	First-class
Matches	16
Runs scored	595
Batting average	22.88
100s/50s	0/2
Top score	64
Balls bowled	1,893
Wickets	26
Bowling average	34.61
5 wickets in innings	0
10 wickets in match	0
Best bowling	4/21
Catches/stumpings	8/–
- Source: Cricinfo, 12 July 2019

Stephen Garland Lester (18 March 1906 – 24 October 1971) was a New Zealand cricketer who played first-class cricket for Canterbury from 1929 to 1936.

== Career ==
A right-handed middle-order batsman and medium-pace bowler, Lester was a regular member of the Canterbury team in the early 1930s. His highest score came in his second match, when he scored 12 and 64 and took 2 for 45 and 3 for 56 against Wellington in the Plunket Shield. His best bowling figures came a year later against Auckland, when in Canterbury's four-wicket victory he took 4 for 21 and 2 for 73 and made 35. When there was speculation about the possible addition of a 15th player to the New Zealand team to tour England in 1931, Lester was one of the players in contention; however, only 14 toured. A year later he was twelfth man for New Zealand in the First Test against South Africa in 1931-32, played in Christchurch.

During the Second World War Lester served in New Zealand in the Royal New Zealand Air Force, first as a flying officer, then as a squadron leader and commanding officer of the Christchurch Wing. He was a member of the New Zealand Cricket Council.

The Stephen Lester Memorial Trophy is awarded annually to the bowler taking the most wickets in the Christchurch men's premiership competition.

== Personal life ==
Lester worked as a stock and station agent. In March 1932 he married Eleanor West-Watson, whose father was the Anglican Bishop of Christchurch. They had two sons and a daughter.
