= Randolph Mainwaring =

English cricketer (1839–1902)

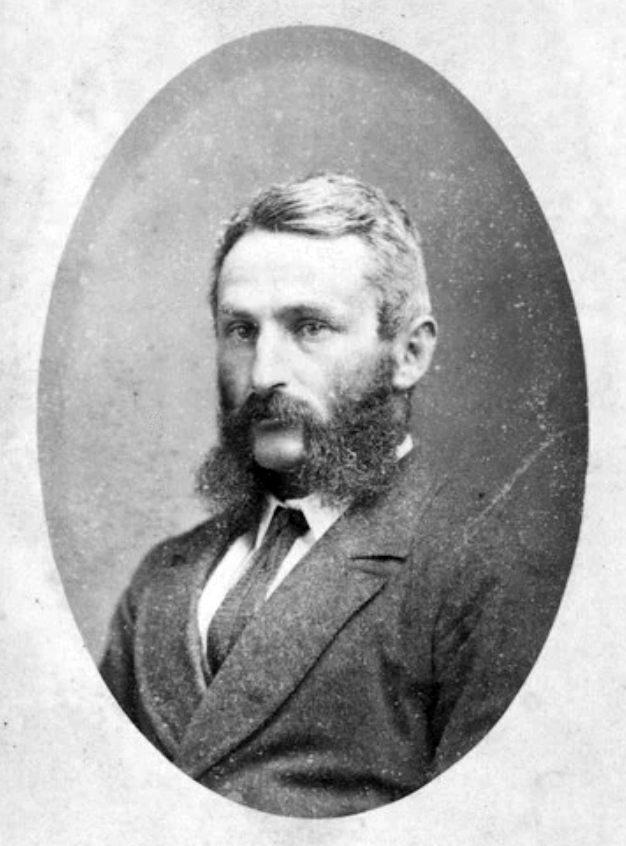
- Mainwaring in the 1870s

Personal information
- Born: 26 July 1839; Whitmore, Staffordshire, England
- Died: 27 December 1902 (aged 63); Edmonton, London, England

Domestic team information
- Years: Team
- 1866/67–1870/71: Canterbury
- Source: Cricinfo, 17 October 2020

Randolph Mainwaring (26 July 1839 – 27 December 1902) was an English cricketer. He played in four first-class matches in New Zealand for Canterbury from 1866 to 1871.

Mainwaring worked for some years in the Education Department of Canterbury Province until the abolition of the provinces in 1876. He then worked as a journalist, writer and artist before returning to England in the 1880s. He married Edith Foley in Mitcham, Surrey, in August 1883.
