= George Rayner =

New Zealand cricketer

Personal information
- Full name: George Lucas Rayner
- Born: 15 October 1863; Northampton, England
- Died: 20 February 1915 (aged 51); Christchurch, New Zealand

Domestic team information
- Years: Team
- 1884/85–1889/90: Canterbury
- 1887/88: Otago

Career statistics
| Competition | First-class |
|---|---|
| Matches | 7 |
| Runs scored | 167 |
| Batting average | 18.55 |
| 100s/50s | 0/0 |
| Top score | 49* |
| Balls bowled | 357 |
| Wickets | 2 |
| Bowling average | 46.50 |
| 5 wickets in innings | 0 |
| 10 wickets in match | 0 |
| Best bowling | 2/36 |
| Catches/stumpings | 1/– |
- Source: ESPNcricinfo, 18 October 2021

George Lucas Rayner (15 October 1863 – 20 February 1915) was a New Zealand cricketer. He played in seven first-class cricket matches for Canterbury and Otago between the 1884–85 and 1889–90 seasons.

Rayner was born at Northampton in England in 1863. He made his representative debut for Canterbury during the 1884–85 season. His highest first-class score was 49 not out, the highest score of the match, batting ninth in the order for Canterbury when they defeated Otago by 10 wickets in February 1887. A year later, playing for Otago, he made 11 and 33, the second-highest score of the match, when Otago beat Canterbury by 103 runs.

Rayner married Lizzie Lane in Ashburton in December 1892. They lived in Christchurch, where he worked as a bootmaker. In 1908 he became the publican of the Shades Hotel in Hereford Street, Christchurch. He died in Christchurch in February 1915, aged 51 after suffering from pulmonary tuberculosis. His wife died in November 1941, survived by their daughter.
