= Bill Lawrence (cricketer) =

New Zealand cricketer (born 1963)

Personal information
- Born: 19 September 1963 (age 63); Christchurch, New Zealand
- Source: Cricinfo, 17 October 2020

Bill Lawrence (born 19 September 1963) is a New Zealand former cricketer. He played in eight first-class and six List A matches for Canterbury from 1986 to 1988. After his cricket career, he became a bank manager.
