= Ivan Allardyce =

New Zealand cricketer

Personal information
- Born: 15 April 1895; Christchurch, New Zealand
- Died: 14 November 1967 (aged 72); Palmerston North, New Zealand
- Source: Cricinfo, 13 October 2020

Ivan Allardyce (15 April 1895 – 14 November 1967) was a New Zealand cricketer. He played in four first-class matches for Canterbury and Wellington between 1917 and 1919.
