= Henry Lance =

English cricketer

Personal information
- Full name: Henry Porcher Lance
- Born: 1832; Buckland St Mary, Somerset, England
- Died: 19 May 1886 (aged 53–54); Christchurch, New Zealand
- Source: Cricinfo, 17 October 2020

Henry Porcher Lance (1832 – 19 May 1886) was a New Zealand cricketer. He captained Canterbury in the first two first-class matches held in New Zealand.

== Life and career ==
Lance was born in Somerset in 1832, and was educated at Winchester College and Brasenose College, Oxford. He went to New Zealand in the 1850s with his brother, James Dupré Lance, who became an MHR. Together they took up a run near Hawarden in Canterbury.

In his first first-class match, which was also New Zealand's inaugural first-class match, Lance captained Canterbury against Otago. Canterbury lost. He also captained Canterbury in the corresponding match in the next season, taking five wickets and scoring useful runs in Canterbury's victory. He was prominent in horse-racing circles in the Canterbury region as a rider, owner, breeder and official.

Lance married Mary Bradshaw in Christchurch in November 1860. Mary died in August 1875. He married Eleanor Robinson in Christchurch in January 1883. He died of heart disease in May 1886.
