= Percy Allen (cricketer) =

New Zealand cricketer

Personal information
- Full name: Percy Frederick Allen
- Born: 7 January 1908; Mitcham, Surrey, England
- Died: 10 December 1995 (aged 87); Christchurch, New Zealand
- Batting: Right-handed
- Role: Wicketkeeper-batsman

Domestic team information
- Years: Team
- 1928-29 to 1934-35: Canterbury

Career statistics
Competition	First-class
Matches	7
Runs scored	278
Batting average	34.75
100s/50s	1/1
Top score	103
Catches/stumpings	2/3
- Source: Cricinfo, 9 June 2019

Percy Frederick Allen (7 January 1908 – 10 December 1995) was a New Zealand cricketer who played first-class cricket for Canterbury between 1929 and 1934.

Percy Allen was a batsman who sometimes kept wicket. After his first-class career ended, he often bowled in local cricket. He made one first-class century, 103 for Canterbury against Wellington in the 1933–34 season. It was the highest score in a match that Canterbury won by eight wickets. While many of his strokes were unorthodox, they had considerable power. In the mid-1930s he moved to Greymouth, then to Ashburton, representing the district team in each town.

Allen worked as an insurance agent. He served in the New Zealand Army in World War II as a private.
