= Jack Harliwich =

New Zealand cricketer (1930–2026)

Personal information
- Full name: Jack Austin Harliwich
- Born: 14 July 1930; Christchurch, New Zealand
- Died: 1 April 2026 (aged 95); Christchurch, New Zealand
- Batting: Right-handed
- Bowling: Right-arm medium-pace
- Source: Cricinfo, 17 October 2020

Jack Austin Harliwich (14 July 1930 – 1 April 2026) was a New Zealand cricketer. A right-arm medium pacer, he played one first-class match for Canterbury, as part of the Plunket Shield competition, at Lancaster Park against Wellington in January 1952. He also played for several Canterbury representative sides in non-first-class matches.

In Harliwich's first-class match, he was the fifth bowler used by Canterbury in each innings, taking 1–30 (from 11 overs) in the first innings and 0–29 (14 overs) in the second. The four bowlers used ahead of him by Canterbury were all Test cricketers for New Zealand: John Hayes, Tony MacGibbon, Tom Burtt, and Zin Harris. Harliwich bowled the Test player John Reid for a duck. He batted once, scoring seven runs from number 10 in the batting order, before being bowled by Bob Blair. Canterbury won the match, their final in the 1951–52 season, by seven wickets.

In 1983, Harliwich was appointed Canterbury's coach.

Harliwich died in Christchurch on 1 April 2026, at the age of 95.
