= Peter Kennedy (cricketer) =

New Zealand cricketer (born 1965)

Personal information
- Born: 20 April 1965 (age 61); Christchurch, New Zealand
- Source: Cricinfo, 17 October 2020

Peter Kennedy (born 20 April 1965) is a New Zealand cricketer. He played in 47 first-class and 25 List A matches for Canterbury from 1985 to 1992.
