= Alfred Ackroyd (New Zealand cricketer) =

New Zealand cricketer

Personal information
- Full name: Alfred Edward Ackroyd
- Born: 14 January 1885; Dunedin, New Zealand
- Died: 21 May 1952 (aged 67); Christchurch, New Zealand
- Batting: Right-handed

Domestic team information
- Years: Team
- 1906/07: Otago
- 1907/08: Canterbury

Career statistics
Competition	First-class
Matches	4
Runs scored	113
Batting average	14.12
100s/50s	0/0
Top score	42
Catches/stumpings	6/–
- Source: CricketArchive, 25 January 2021

Alfred Edward Ackroyd (14 January 1885 – 21 May 1952) was a New Zealand cricketer. He played first-class cricket for Otago and Canterbury in the 1906–07 and 1907–08 seasons.

Ackroyd was born at Dunedin in 1885. Outside of cricket he worked as a warehouseman. He played three times for Otago during the 1906–07 season, making his debut against Canterbury in December 1906 before playing in both of Otago's matches against the touring Marylebone Cricket Club team in January 1907. The following season he played once for Canterbury against Otago, recording two ducks.

Ackroyd died at Christchurch in 1952 aged 67.
