= John Souter (cricketer) =

New Zealand cricketer

Personal information
- Born: c. 1844; New Zealand
- Died: 13 July 1905 (aged 60–61); Christchurch, New Zealand
- Source: Cricinfo, 20 October 2020

John Souter (c. 1844 – 13 July 1905) was a New Zealand cricketer. He played in three first-class matches for Canterbury from 1871 to 1874.

== See also ==
- List of Canterbury representative cricketers
