= Edward Harley (cricketer) =

English cricketer

Personal information
- Born: 1839; Leicester, England
- Died: 9 June 1901 (aged 61–62); Rakahu, New Zealand
- Source: Cricinfo, 17 October 2020

Edward Harley (1839 – 9 June 1901) was an English-born New Zealand cricketer. He played in three first-class matches in New Zealand for Canterbury from 1864 to 1869.

== See also ==
- List of Canterbury representative cricketers
