= Mark Lane (New Zealand cricketer) =

New Zealand cricketer (born 1969)

Personal information
- Full name: Mark Edward Landon-Lane
- Born: 6 February 1969; Blenheim, New Zealand
- Source: CricketArchive, 8 November 2024

Mark Edward Landon-Lane (born 6 February 1969) is a New Zealand former cricketer. He was raised in Blenheim by his parents Stan and Helen Landon-Lane. His father and uncles played local cricket.

A wicket-keeper, Lane made seven appearances in youth internationals for New Zealand, scoring 214 runs and claiming 10 dismissals. He went on to make 22 first-class and six List A appearances, playing for Wellington in 1990–91 and 1991–92, Central Districts in 1993–94 and Canterbury in 1995–96 and 1996–97.
