= Glynn Howell =

New Zealand cricketer (born 1976)

Personal information
- Born: 11 October 1976 (age 50); Napier, New Zealand
- Source: Cricinfo, 17 October 2020

Glynn Howell (born 11 October 1976) is a New Zealand cricketer. He played in four first-class matches for Canterbury and Wellington from 1998 to 2002.
