= Bruce Irving =

New Zealand cricketer

Personal information
- Full name: Bruce Carlyle Irving
- Born: 19 August 1932 (age 94); Christchurch, New Zealand
- Batting: Right-handed
- Bowling: Right-arm off-spin
- Role: Bowler

Domestic team information
- Years: Team
- 1962/63–1972/73: Canterbury

Career statistics
Competition	First-class
Matches	19
Runs scored	137
Batting average	9.78
100s/50s	0/0
Top score	23
Balls bowled	3,413
Wickets	44
Bowling average	28.72
5 wickets in innings	0
10 wickets in match	0
Best bowling	4/32
Catches/stumpings	6/–
- Source: Cricinfo, 17 May 2024

Bruce Carlyle Irving (born 19 August 1932) is a former New Zealand cricketer. He played in nineteen first-class matches, mostly for Canterbury, between 1962 and 1973.

Born in Christchurch, Irving was educated at Christchurch West High School. He was an off-spin bowler who had the ability to turn the ball at a brisk pace. He made his first-class debut on Christmas Day 1962 at the age of 30, taking seven wickets (match figures of 32.3–12–78–7) as Canterbury defeated Otago by 113 runs at Carisbrook, Dunedin. He was selected to play for a New Zealand Cricket Council President's XI against the touring Pakistanis in 1964–65, as the selectors were hoping to find spin bowlers who might succeed on the approaching tour of India, Pakistan and England. He took two wickets and, batting at number 11, made his highest first-class score of 23, but was not selected in the touring side.

Irving had a career of more than 30 seasons for the Lancaster Park club in senior cricket in the Canterbury Cricket Association competition. During the 1977–78 season he became the second-highest wicket-taker in the competition's history when he took his 860th wicket. During the 1981–82 season he became the second player, after Reg Read, to take 1,000 wickets. A few weeks later he set a competition record when he took his 149th catch. He retired aged 54 during the 1986–87 season after 327 matches (the competition record), 175 catches (also a record), and 1,160 wickets (second after Read).
