= Barry Thomas (cricketer) =

New Zealand cricketer (born 1956)

Personal information
- Born: 20 November 1956 (age 69); Wellington, New Zealand
- Source: Cricinfo, 20 October 2020

Barry Thomas (born 20 November 1956) is a New Zealand cricketer. He played in one first-class match for Canterbury in 1980/81.

== See also ==
- List of Canterbury representative cricketers
