= Ben Yock =

New Zealand cricketer (born 1975)

Personal information
- Full name: Benjamin Arthur Yock
- Born: 8 February 1975 (age 51); Christchurch, New Zealand
- Batting: Right-handed

Domestic team information
- Years: Team
- 1996/97–1997/98: Canterbury

Career statistics
Competition	First-class	List A
Matches	2	2
Runs scored	20	1
Batting average	6.66	1.00
100s/50s	0/0	0/0
Top score	11	1
Catches/stumpings	4/–	0/–
- Source: Cricinfo, 16 February 2010

Benjamin Arthur Yock (born 8 February 1975) is a former New Zealand cricketer who played two first-class matches for the Canterbury Wizards in 1997. He played as a wicket-keeper.

In 2002, during a strike by members of the New Zealand Cricket Players' Association, Yock made headlines by breaking ranks and agreeing to play for Canterbury. He was born at Christchurch in 1975.
