= James Hargreaves (New Zealand cricketer) =

New Zealand cricketer

Personal information
- Born: 13 August 1868; Christchurch, New Zealand
- Died: 11 October 1924 (aged 56); Christchurch, New Zealand
- Source: Cricinfo, 17 October 2020

James Hargreaves (13 August 1868 – 11 October 1924) was a New Zealand cricketer. He played in one first-class match for Canterbury in 1886/87.

== See also ==
- List of Canterbury representative cricketers
