= Robert Taylor (New Zealand cricketer) =

New Zealand cricketer

Personal information
- Born: 1835
- Died: 30 October 1901 (aged 65–66); Sefton, Canterbury, New Zealand
- Role: Bowler

Domestic team information
- Years: Team
- 1863-64 to 1868-69: Canterbury

Career statistics
Competition	First-class
Matches	2
Runs scored	5
Batting average	2.50
100s/50s	0/0
Top score	4
Balls bowled	246
Wickets	9
Bowling average	7.88
5 wickets in innings	1
10 wickets in match	0
Best bowling	6/21
Catches/stumpings	0/–
- Source: CricketArchive, 20 October 2020

Robert Taylor (1835 – 30 October 1901) was a New Zealand cricketer who played two matches of first-class cricket for Canterbury in 1864 and 1869. He bowled the first delivery in New Zealand first-class cricket.

Taylor opened the bowling for Canterbury in the match against Otago in January 1864 that is now recognised as the first first-class match in New Zealand. He took 6 for 21 in the first innings and 2 for 23 in the second, but Canterbury nevertheless lost by 78 runs.

He died at his home in the small town of Sefton, north of Christchurch, on 30 October 1901, survived by his wife Jeanie.
