= Alan Devlin (cricketer) =

New Zealand cricketer (born 1959)

Personal information
- Born: 2 October 1959 (age 67); Rangiora, New Zealand
- Source: Cricinfo, 15 October 2020

Alan Devlin (born 2 October 1959) is a New Zealand cricketer. He played in three first-class and two List A matches for Canterbury in 1983/84. He also played for North Canterbury.

== See also ==
- List of Canterbury representative cricketers
