= Henry Edser =

New Zealand cricketer

Personal information
- Born: 1862; Islington, Middlesex, England
- Died: 9 December 1938 (aged 76); Christchurch, New Zealand

Domestic team information
- Years: Team
- 1883–84: Canterbury

Career statistics
Competition	First-class
Matches	2
Runs scored	28
Batting average	14.00
100s/50s	0/0
Top score	13
Balls bowled	297
Wickets	14
Bowling average	12.00
5 wickets in innings	2
10 wickets in match	1
Best bowling	8/75
Catches/stumpings	0/–
- Source: CricketArchive, 16 January 2020

Henry Edser (1862 – 9 December 1938) was a New Zealand cricketer who played two matches of first-class cricket for Canterbury in the 1883–84 season.

Born in England, Edser was a bowler and useful lower-order batsman who went on Canterbury's northern tour in December-January 1883–84. He did little in the first match against Auckland, but in the second match, against Wellington, he took 5 for 65 and 8 for 75, as well as scoring some useful runs in a low-scoring match, to help take Canterbury to a 15-run victory. It was the first time a Canterbury bowler had taken as many as 13 wickets in a first-class match. However, he played no further matches for Canterbury.

Edser was a civil servant. He and his wife Annie had two children before she died in April 1894, aged 26. He died in December 1938, aged 76.
