= Arthur Washer =

New Zealand cricketer

Personal information
- Full name: Arthur Theobold Washer
- Born: 1855; Brighton, England
- Died: 10 November 1910 (aged 54–55); Christchurch, New Zealand
- Batting: Left-handed
- Bowling: Slow left-arm orthodox

Domestic team information
- Years: Team
- 1884/85: Canterbury
- Source: Cricinfo, 22 October 2020

Arthur Theobold Washer (1855 – 10 November 1910) was a New Zealand cricketer. He played in one first-class match for Canterbury during the 1884–85 season.

Born at Brighton in 1855, Washer was educated at Christ's College in Christchurch after having migrated to New Zealand with his family. He worked as an accountant, including for 25 years on the staff of the Lyttelton Times newspaper.

A member of the Midland Cricket Club, Washer took an interest in a variety of sports, including athletics, boxing, cycling, and rugby football. A left-handed batsman who hit well to the leg-side, he was considered an "excellent field" at point. He played only one first-class match for Canterbury, scoring seven and 31 in his two innings against Otago in February 1885. He also played for the provincial side in March 1888, one of 18 players against Arthur Shrewsbury's English touring side.

Married with adult children, Washer died suddenly from a blood clot in November 1910 aged 53. He had umpired a cricket match on the afternoon of his death. An obituary was published in the 1912 edition of Wisden Cricketer's Almanack.
