= Arthur Redmayne =

New Zealand cricketer

Arthur Tunstal Redmayne (25 April 1857 – 27 December 1933) was an English-born New Zealand cricketer who played for Canterbury. He was born in Hendon, Middlesex and died in Ambleside, Westmorland.

Redmayne made a single first-class appearance for the team, during the 1880–81 season, against Otago. In the only innings in which he batted, he scored 61 runs.
