= Gilbert Stringer =

New Zealand cricketer

Personal information
- Born: 18 March 1910; Christchurch, New Zealand
- Died: 20 May 1991 (aged 81); Wellington, New Zealand
- Source: Cricinfo, 20 October 2020

Gilbert Stringer (18 March 1910 – 20 May 1991) was a New Zealand cricketer. He played in four first-class matches for Canterbury and Wellington from 1933 to 1944.
