= Kenneth Bain (cricketer) =

New Zealand cricketer

Personal information
- Born: 22 June 1882; Dunedin, New Zealand
- Died: 26 October 1942 (aged 60); Christchurch, New Zealand
- Source: Cricinfo, 14 October 2020

Kenneth Bain (22 June 1882 – 26 October 1942) was a New Zealand cricketer. He played in three first-class matches for Canterbury in 1906/07.

== See also ==
- List of Canterbury representative cricketers
