= William Calvert (cricketer) =

New Zealand cricketer

Personal information
- Born: 1839; Sunderland, England
- Died: 10 February 1894 (aged 54–55); Christchurch, New Zealand
- Source: Cricinfo, 15 October 2020

William Calvert (1839 – 10 February 1894) was a New Zealand cricketer. He played in two first-class matches for Canterbury from 1865 to 1868.

== See also ==
- List of Canterbury representative cricketers
