= Noel Jones (cricketer) =

New Zealand cricketer

Personal information
- Born: 11 December 1891; Christchurch, New Zealand
- Died: 11 May 1948 (aged 56); Christchurch, New Zealand
- Source: Cricinfo, 17 October 2020

Noel Jones (11 December 1891 – 11 May 1948) was a New Zealand cricketer. He played in five first-class matches for Canterbury from 1918 to 1921.
