= Glenn Bateman =

New Zealand cricketer (born 1955)

Personal information
- Born: 30 November 1955 (age 70); Christchurch, New Zealand
- Source: Cricinfo, 14 October 2020

Glenn Bateman (born 30 November 1955) is a New Zealand cricketer. He played in 23 first-class and 16 List A matches for Canterbury between 1979 and 1985.

== See also ==
- List of Canterbury representative cricketers
