= Samuel McMurray =

New Zealand cricketer and businessman

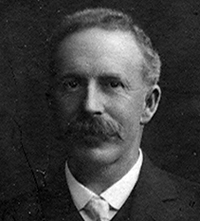

Personal information
- Born: 1863; Bangor, County Down, Ireland
- Died: 24 August 1937 (aged 74); Christchurch, New Zealand

Domestic team information
- Years: Team
- 1884/85–1896/97: Canterbury
- Source: Cricinfo, 17 October 2020

Samuel McMurray (1863 – 24 August 1937) was a New Zealand cricketer and businessman.

McMurray was born in Bangor, County Down, Ireland, in 1863, and his family migrated to New Zealand shortly afterwards, settling in Christchurch. McMurray was employed as a clerk by William Montgomery and Company, timber merchants, in Christchurch in 1878, and he eventually became the managing director and chairman of directors of the succeeding company, Williams Stephens and Company. He and his wife, who predeceased him, had three daughters. He died at his home in Christchurch in August 1937, aged 74.

McMurray played in four first-class matches for Canterbury between 1884 and 1897.
