= Harvey King =

New Zealand cricketer (born 1956)

Personal information
- Full name: Robert Harvey King
- Born: 19 October 1956 (age 70); Gore, New Zealand
- Source: Cricinfo, 17 October 2020

Harvey King (born 19 October 1956) is a New Zealand cricketer and cricket administrator. He played in five first-class and two List A matches for Canterbury in 1977/78.

King was educated at Timaru Boys' High School. A right-arm opening bowler, he took seven wickets bowling in tandem with Dayle Hadlee to take Canterbury to victory over Otago in the first match of the 1977-78 Shell Cup.

He sustained severe injuries in a car crash in his early twenties, ending his first-class career. However, he continued to play Hawke Cup cricket for South Canterbury, and was a leading administrator for Canterbury and South Canterbury. In 2021 he was named patron of South Canterbury Cricket.
