= Thomas Malone (cricketer) =

New Zealand cricketer

Personal information
- Full name: Thomas Joseph Malone
- Born: 17 May 1876; Christchurch, New Zealand
- Died: 5 June 1933 (aged 57); Christchurch, New Zealand
- Batting: Right-handed
- Bowling: Right-arm spin

Domestic team information
- Years: Team
- 1895-96 to 1908-09: Canterbury

Career statistics
Competition	First-class
Matches	11
Runs scored	24
Batting average	2.66
100s/50s	0/0
Top score	7
Balls bowled	2080
Wickets	39
Bowling average	22.76
5 wickets in innings	1
10 wickets in match	–
Best bowling	7/30
Catches/stumpings	0/0
- Source: Cricinfo, 11 November 2017

Thomas Joseph Malone (17 May 1876 – 5 June 1933) was a New Zealand cricketer who played first-class cricket for Canterbury from 1896 to 1909.

Malone was a right-arm spin bowler, able to move the ball either way off the pitch, who often opened the bowling. He bowled unchanged throughout the innings when he took his best first-class figures, 7 for 30 against Otago in 1896–97. Canterbury dismissed Otago in the first innings for 68, but Otago recovered to win by 146 runs. He represented New Zealand once, in a four-day match against the touring Melbourne Cricket Club in 1905–06, a tour that, despite the strength of the Melbourne team, does not have first-class status. He took 7 for 54, New Zealand's only notable performance in match that the inclement weather helped them to draw.

Malone worked for more than 30 years for P. & D. Duncan Ltd. engineering works in Christchurch. He died at the age of 57, leaving a widow and their three daughters and a son.
