= Gerald Wontner =

English cricketer

Personal information
- Born: 17 December 1848; Shoreditch, Middlesex, England
- Died: 6 October 1885 (aged 36); Upton Manor, England
- Source: Cricinfo, 22 October 2020

Gerald Wontner (17 December 1848 – 6 October 1885) was an English cricketer. He played in one first-class match in New Zealand for Canterbury in 1872/73.

== See also ==
- List of Canterbury representative cricketers
