= Charles Guiney =

New Zealand cricketer

Personal information
- Full name: Charles Edward Guiney
- Born: 29 April 1895; Christchurch, New Zealand
- Died: 15 December 1972 (aged 77); Glendownie, Auckland, New Zealand

Domestic team information
- Years: Team
- 1918/19: Canterbury
- Source: Cricinfo, 17 October 2020

Charles Edward Guiney (29 April 1895 – 15 December 1972) was a New Zealand journalist and sportsman. He was a sports editor at the New Zealand Herald and played representative cricket and rugby union for Canterbury. He played in two first-class matches for the Canterbury cricket team during the 1918–19 season.

Born at Christchurch, the youngest son of a family described as "athletic", Guiney was educated at Christchurch Boys' High School where he captained the school's rugby and cricket teams.

After leaving school Guiney worked as a journalist. At the time that he registered for military service during the First World War in 1915 he was working in the Christchurch office of The Lyttelton Times; two of his brothers, all of whom served during the war, worked at The Press in the city. It was not until July 1918 that Guiney was called up for training, and by the end of August he had been discharged.

At the end of 1918 Guiney made his Plunket Shield cricket debut for Canterbury. Playing against Wellington at the Hagley Oval in Christchurch, he made two runs in his first innings and was dismissed for a duck in his second as Wellington won a close match which started on Christmas Day. The following month he played in the return match, scoring 11 runs in his only innings as Canterbury won at the Basin Reserve.

Guiney coached the High School Old Boys' rugby team before, in 1927, he took up a position as a sports editor at the New Zealand Herald in Auckland. He remained with the paper until his retirement due to ill health towards the end of the 1950s, serving as a deputy-editor of the sports section covering cricket and rugby. He frequently travelled overseas with New Zealand teams and was "highly regarded" as a journalist. He died at Auckland in 1972 aged 77.
