= Steve McNally (cricketer) =

New Zealand cricketer (born 1958)

Personal information
- Full name: Stephen Ray McNally
- Born: 28 September 1958 (age 68); Christchurch, New Zealand
- Source: Cricinfo, 17 October 2020

Steve McNally (born 28 September 1958) is a New Zealand cricketer. He played in 33 first-class and 19 List A matches for Canterbury from 1978 to 1986.

== See also ==
- List of Canterbury representative cricketers
