= Graeme Kench =

New Zealand cricketer (born 1959)

Personal information
- Born: 23 February 1959 (age 67); Christchurch, New Zealand
- Source: Cricinfo, 17 October 2020

Graeme Kench (born 23 February 1959) is a New Zealand cricketer. He played in one List A match for Canterbury in 1982/83.
