= Ernest Gasson (cricketer, born 1887) =

New Zealand cricketer

Personal information
- Born: 14 August 1887; Christchurch, New Zealand
- Died: 3 March 1962 (aged 74); Christchurch, New Zealand
- Source: Cricinfo, 17 October 2020

Ernest Gasson (14 August 1887 – 3 March 1962) was a New Zealand cricketer. He played in six first-class matches for Canterbury from 1924 to 1926.

== See also ==
- List of Canterbury representative cricketers
