= George Lee =

George Lee may refer to:

== Politicians ==
- Sir George Lee (English politician) (c. 1700–1758), English politician
- George Leslie Lee (1814–1897), member of the New Zealand Legislative Council
- George Lee, 3rd Earl of Lichfield (1718–1772), British politician and peer
- George Lee, Chinese British, Conservative Parliamentary candidate for Holborn & St Pancras
- George Lee (Australian politician) (1834–1912), New South Wales pastoralist and politician
- George Lee (journalist) (born 1962), Irish economist, journalist and former Fine Gael politician
- George W. Lee (New Jersey politician) (1931–2007), American Democratic Party politician

== Sports ==
- George Lee (basketball) (born 1936), American former basketball player and coach
- George Lee (cricketer, born 1854) (1854–1919), Yorkshire cricketer
- George Lee (cricketer, born 1810) (1810–1894), English cricketer
- George Lee (New Zealand cricketer) (1851-1931), New Zealand cricketer
- George B. Lee (1817–1903), cricketer
- George Lee (footballer) (1919–1991), English footballer
- George Lee (pilot) (born 1946), winner of three World Gliding Championships
- George Lee (athlete) (1886–?), British track and field athlete
- George Lee (American football) (1873–1927), American college football player and medical doctor

== Musicians ==
- George E. Lee (1896–1958), American jazz musician
- George Alexander Lee (1802–1851), English musician

== Others ==
- Sir George Lee, 6th Baronet (1767–1827) of the Lee baronets
- George Lee (actor), British actor, in Spearhead from Space
- George Hay Lee (1808–1873), judge of the Virginia Court of Appeals
- George P. Lee (1943–2010), Native American General Authority of the Church of Jesus Christ of Latter-day Saints
- George W. Lee (1903–1955), civil rights activist
- George Washington Custis Lee (1832–1913), Confederate major general in the American Civil War
- George Lee, 2nd Earl of Lichfield (1690–1742)
- George Ludlow Lee Sr. (1901–1966), chairman of the board of Red Devil, Inc.
- George Washington Lee (1894–1976), African-American soldier, author, political leader and corporate executive
- George Augustus Lee (1761–1826), British industrialist
- George Henry Lee, a department store located in Liverpool, England
- George Lee (postmaster), postmaster general of Ceylon
- George Cabot Lee Jr. (1871–1950), American banker
- George Lee (dancer) (1935–2025), New York City Ballet's first Asian dancer
- Frederick George Lee (1832–1902), priest of the Church of England and a religious author

== See also ==
- George Leigh (disambiguation)
