= Fenwick (surname) =

Fenwick is a surname. Notable people with the surname include:

- Alf Fenwick (1891–1975), English footballer
- Alistair Fenwick (born 1951), retired British auto racing driver
- Benedict Joseph Fenwick (1782–1846), the second Roman Catholic Bishop of Boston
- Bobby Fenwick (born 1946), retired Major League Baseball player
- Charles Fenwick (1850–1918), British trade unionist and politician
- Deshaun Fenwick (born 1999), American football player
- Edward Fenwick (1768–1832), Bishop of Cincinnati, Ohio
- Eliza Fenwick (1766–1840), English author
- Ethel Gordon Fenwick (1857–1947), British nurse
- Fairfax Fenwick (1852–1920), New Zealand cricketer
- George Fenwick (editor) (1847–1929), New Zealand newspaper proprietor and editor
- Herbert Fenwick (1861–1934), New Zealand cricketer
- Irene Fenwick (1887–1936), American stage and silent film actress
- Isabella Fenwick (1783 – 1856), British amanuensis and writer of Fenwick Notes
- Jean Fenwick (1907-1998), American actress born in Trinidad
- Jim Fenwick (1934-2021), Australian photojournalist
- Sir John Fenwick, 1st Baronet (c. 1570 – c. 1658), English landowner
- Sir John Fenwick, 3rd Baronet (1645–1697), English conspirator
- John Fenwick (Quaker) (1618–1683), founder of Salem, New Jersey
- Sir Leonard Fenwick, chief executive in the National Health Service
- Lila Fenwick (1932–2020), American lawyer, human rights advocate, and United Nations official
- Mark Fenwick (born 1948), British businessman, chairman of Fenwick (department store) chain
- Millicent Fenwick (1910–1992), American politician and diplomat
- Minden Fenwick (1864–1938), tennis player in England and New Zealand
- Paul Fenwick (born 1969), retired Canadian international association football player
- Perry Fenwick (born 1962), British actor
- Peter Fenwick (politician) (born 1944), Canadian politician
- Peter Fenwick (neuropsychologist), neuropsychiatrist and neurophysiologist
- Ralph Fenwick, shipping insurer and director of the New Zealand Company in 1825
- Ray Fenwick, guitarist and session musician
- Scott Fenwick (born 1990), English professional footballer
- Steve Fenwick (born 1951), former Wales international rugby union and league player
- Terry Fenwick (born 1959), former England international footballer
- Tyler Fenwick (born c. 1976), American football coach

Fictional characters:

- Chris Fenwick, fictional character on the British television soap opera Hollyoaks
- Doreen Fenwick, fictional character on the British soap opera Coronation Street
- Sir George and Maude Fenwick, characters in The Woman in Green
- Martin Fenwick, villain in the cartoon Sherlock Holmes in the 22nd Century
- Inspector Fenwick of the Royal Canadian Mounted Police and his daughter Nell Fenwick, associates of the cartoon character Dudley Do-Right
- Vernon Fenwick, Teenage Mutant Ninja Turtles
