= Danish New Zealanders =

Total population
- 1,491 (Danish born); 3,507 (Danish ancestry)

Languages
- New Zealand English; Danish

Religion
- Protestant; Roman Catholic

Related ethnic groups
- Danes, Scandinavian New Zealanders, Norwegian New Zealanders, Swedish New Zealanders

Danish New Zealanders are New Zealanders with full or partial Danish ancestry. The majority of these people are part of the Danish diaspora.

== History ==
There is a small Danish community in New Zealand, descended from a group of early settlers who came to clear thick North Island bush in the middle years of the 19th century and stayed to found settlements including Dannevirke and Norsewood. High-ranking Danish churchman, Bishop Ditlev Gothard Monrad, who had been Danish Prime Minister during the Second Schleswig War, left Denmark as a result of the war and settled with his family in Karere near Palmerston North in 1866, where he set up the first dairy plant in the region. Monrad returned to Denmark in 1869, but other members of his family stayed in New Zealand. He left behind his collection of art now housed at the Museum of New Zealand Te Papa Tongarewa. Those who stayed cleared the bush in the area, and their efforts helped convince Julius Vogel that they were suitable in character to become part of his planned 'Great Public Works' scheme of the 1870s. Isaac Featherston went to Scandinavia in 1870 to attract settlers in Norway, Sweden and Denmark. The first settlers from this initiative arrived in 1871 and settled in the bush between Palmerston North and Foxton. Other Danes came to the Seventy Mile Bush area in 1872 and founded the town which retains the Danish name of Dannevirke, commemorating the Danevirke in Slesvig. The other town created by the Danes was Norsewood. Both those towns were named by the government.

New Zealand has encouraged immigration of temporary workers from Denmark.

== Culture ==
When the Danes immigrated to New Zealand, they brought with them their language, festivals, food and culture and assimilated to New Zealand society, such as by learning English. There is the Danish Society Inc. in Auckland which promotes Danish history, culture and language within New Zealand. There is also the Danish Societies in the upper North Island, which includes the Danish Society, Hamilton and the Danish Society, Auckland which hosts festivals and run a newsletter.

== Notable Danish New Zealanders ==
Oscar Alpers	1866-1927	Teacher, English lecturer, historian, Supreme Court Judge	Danish born
Colin Beyer	1938–2015	Lawyer, businessman	Of Danish descent
Arnold Christensen	1922–1944	Royal New Zealand Air Force pilot during World War II	Of Danish descent
Joy Cowley	1936–	Author	Of Danish descent
Marton Csokas	1966–	Actor	Of Danish descent
Yvonne du Fresne	1929–2011	Author	Of Danish descent
Fairfax Fenwick	1852–1920	Cricketer	Danish-born
Herbert Fenwick	1861–1934	Cricketer	Danish-born
Kristian Fredrikson	1940–2005	Stage and costume designer	Of Danish descent
Ditlev Gothard Monrad	1811–1887	Politician, Council President of Denmark	Danish-born
Craig Parker	1970–	Actor, acted in The Lord of the Rings trilogy	Of Danish descent
Bill Schramm	1886–1962	Politician, lawyer	Of Danish descent
Linda Villumsen	1985–	Olympic cyclist	Danish-born

== See also ==
- Denmark–New Zealand relations
- European New Zealanders
- Europeans in Oceania
- Immigration to New Zealand
- Pākehā
- Scandinavian New Zealanders
