= Casa Nova (house) =

Building in Oamaru, New Zealand

- Etymology: Italian for new house

General information
- Type: Mansion
- Architectural style: Neo-Georgian
- Location: Oamaru North, 1 Alt Street, Oamaru
- Coordinates: 45°04′28″S 170°58′47″E
- Year built: 1861

Design and construction
- Architects: Thomas Glass and Michael Grenfell

Heritage New Zealand – Category 1
- Designated: 4 April 2020
- Reference no.: 9261

Casa Nova is a 19th-century neo-Georgian mansion located in Oamaru, New Zealand.

Casa Nova was the first residence in Oamaru to be constructed from Oamaru limestone. It is registered as a category 1 building by Heritage New Zealand.

== Description ==
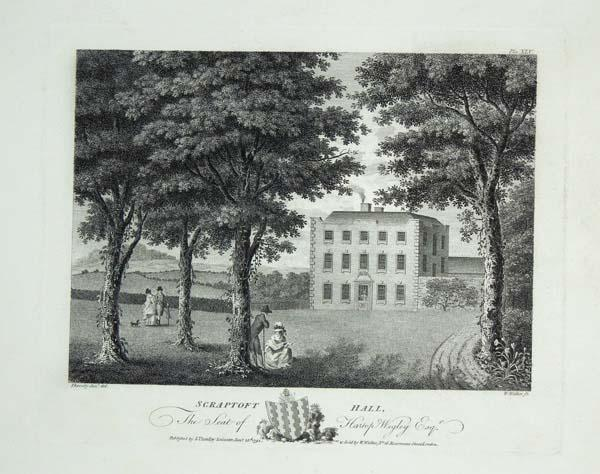
Danet Hall illustrated by John Throsby

Casa Nova is a neo-Georgian two-storey five bedroom mansion. The building is constructed from hand-cut Oamaru limestone with Baltic pine and kauri timbering. The centre of the home is a recessed entryway flanked by two gables with finials. The building has large angled bay windows. The entrance door has a voussoir above. A balcony is located above it on the second storey. The home is surrounded by decorative hedges and specimen trees.

The house originally contained a drawing-room, dining-room, hall, kitchen, larder, and bedroom on the ground floor and on the first floor five bedrooms, a bathroom, and a dressing room alongside a detached washhouse.

The property was originally 1,000 acres (400 ha). 10 acres was for pasture, 15 for crop, and 60 for stock. When the property was sold in 1875, 40 acres (16 ha) was subdivided from the lot.

Newspaper reports describe stables and a men's quarter on the property. Noble was a breeder of Clydesdale horses and had an interesting in horse racing, winning the local horse racing competition.

== Name ==
Casa Nova is Italian for new house. Noble's decision to choose the name is not known but it may be simply descriptive or it may relate to his wife, who died in Bagni di Lucca in 1854 at the age of 20.

== History ==
=== Mark Noble ===
Mark Noble was from Leicestershire, he grew up prosperous as son of Joseph William Noble, a doctor and British member of Parliament. He became a run holder after immigrating to New Zealand.

=== Cava Nova ===
Casa Nova was constructed in 1861 by Mike Burns for Mark Noble. The limestone was likely sourced from quarries around Totara Estate and Kakanui. The architects were Thomas Glass and Michael Grenfell. Both Glass and Grenfell designed other buildings with Oamaru limestone.

The design was possibly inspired by Danet Hall, a grand residence in Leicestershire which was the Noble family home. At the time of its construction Georgian architecture had been out of fashion for a while.

Noble left Oamaru around 1863 and the property was tenanted. He later tried to sell it after leaving New Zealand in 1865 but it did not sell until 7 years after his death in Malta. From c. 1868–1870 Charles Fenwick was tenant. Fenwick was from a noble family and was the brother of Fairfax and William.

John Borton, a runholder from Maerewhenua, bought the property from Noble's estate in 1875. During Borton's tenure an extension made from timber and stone was added. In 1911 he sold the property to David Dunn, the former mayor of Oamaru. Under his ownership the property was further subdivided. Borton sold the property in 1926 to a Mr Parker who sold it in the 1930s to James McMullan, a goldminer who lived there until 1961.

In 1966 the property was bought by Dave and Christine Graham. The Grahams undertook a renovation which involved the demolition of an interior wall to create a larger reception. In 1968 they opened the building as a reception venue. They ran the Casa Nova as a wedding venue. At the time of their management the Casa Nova had only an acre left. In the 1980s Brent and Lynn Twaddle took over the Casa Nova. In 2000 chef David Taylor purchased the property. It was converted into a restaurant in 2000. For this a rear porch, toilets, and car park were constructed, and a commercial kitchen was installed. Taylor continued to run a high-end restaurant there until 2007 when it sold again.

In 2019 it was purchased by a couple who have since converted into a boutique bed and breakfast establishment and tapas restaurant after restoring the building. The restoration was described as 'praiseworthy' for the level of detail and attention to care by The Heritage New Zealand manager for Otago. The Casa Nova received a five-star rating from Qualmark after the restoration.

== Significance ==
Casa Nova is the first grand residence in Oamaru to be constructed from the local Oamaru limestone and the second oldest extant building constructed from the material. It possibly inspired other buildings to use the material which became popular throughout New Zealand and ubiquitous in Oamaru. Casa Nova is the only building of the type still extant.

Oamaru's former Casa Nova School (closed in 1999) and the still extant Casa Nova Kindergarten were both named for the house.
