= W. A. White =

W. A. White may refer to:

- Wayne Andrew White (b. 1985), British cricketer
- William Alanson White (1870–1937), American neurologist and psychiatrist
- William Allen White (1868–1944), American writer and politician
- William Allison White (1894–1974), British Army officer
- William Andrew White II (1874–1936), Canadian Army chaplain
- William Arthur White (1824–1891), British diplomat

== See also ==
- William Anthony Parker White (1911–1968), American author and critic who wrote under the nom de plume Anthony Boucher
