= Hildenborough =

Village in Kent, England

Coordinates: 51.214°N 0.242°E

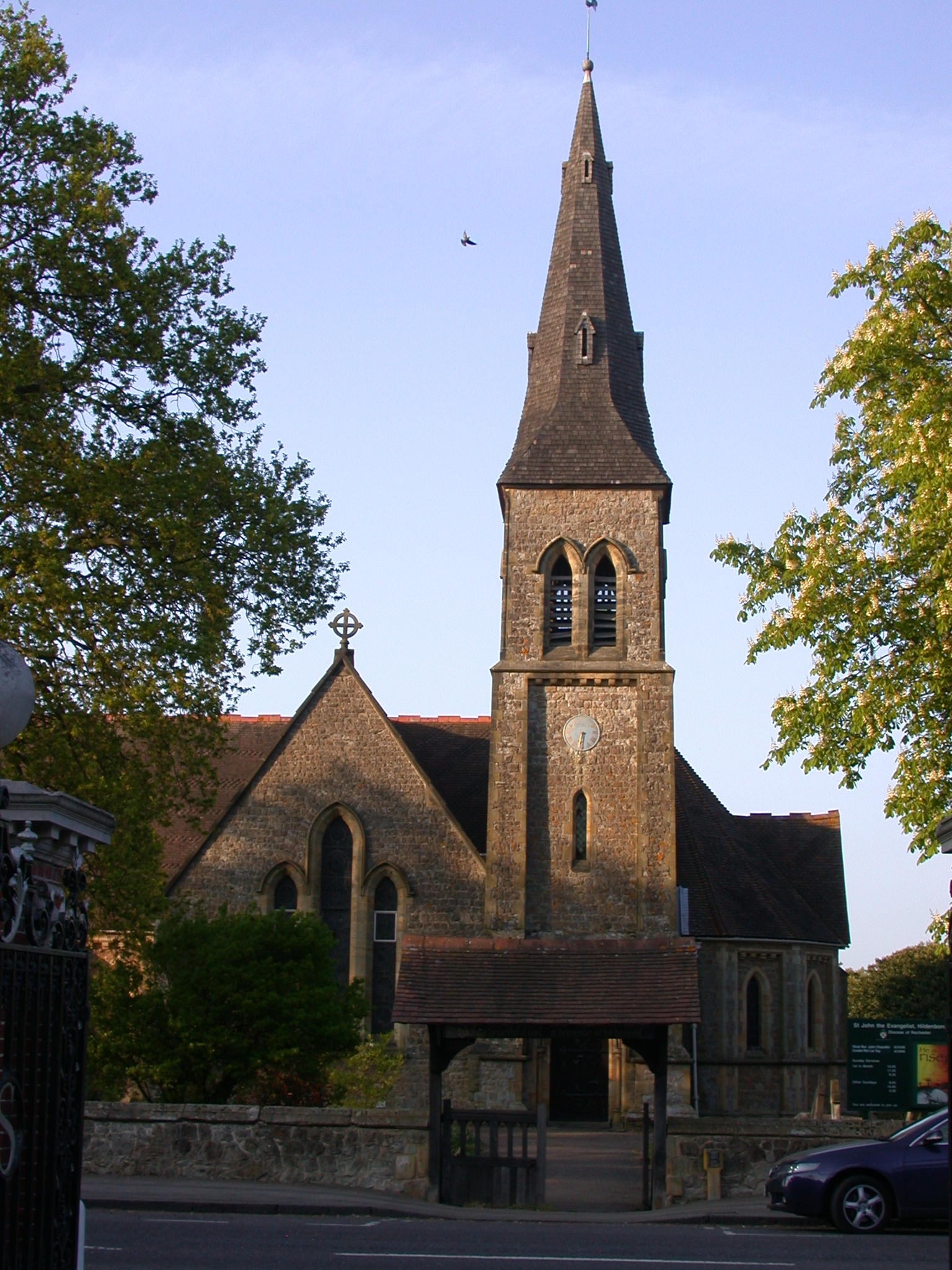
- St John the Evangelist Church

- Location within Kent
- Population: 4,977 (2021 census)
- OS grid reference: TQ565485
- District: Tonbridge and Malling
- Shire county: Kent
- Region: South East
- Country: England
- Sovereign state: United Kingdom
- Post town: TONBRIDGE
- Postcode district: TN11
- Dialling code: 01732
- Police: Kent
- Fire: Kent
- Ambulance: South East Coast
- UK Parliament: Tonbridge

Hildenborough is a village and rural parish in the borough of Tonbridge and Malling in Kent, England. It is located 2 miles (3.2 km) north-west of Tonbridge and 5 miles (8 km) south-east of Sevenoaks. The village lies in the River Medway valley, near the North Downs, in an area known as The Weald.

== Origin of name ==
Hildenborough was originally just Hilden – or, in its 13th-century form, Hyldenn. The elements here are Old English hyll 'hill' and denn 'woodland pasture', so the sense is of a 'pasture on or by a hill'. By 1349 the name had become Hildenborough, since Hilden was one of the boroughs of the Lowy of Tunbridge.

== History ==
=== Early history ===
Arms of Children of Childrens

A notable family of Hildenborough were the Childrens, who lived at a house named for them Childrens, situated at Nether Street (now Lower Street) The first of this family to live in Hildenborough was Simon Children who set up as a farmer at Lower Street Farm (which he then called ‘Childrens’) in about 1379. Of this family were George Children who served as High Sheriff of Kent in 1698 and John George Children the chemist, mineralogist and zoologist who was the founding president of the Royal Entomological Society.

=== World War II ===
At the outbreak of World War II in September 1939 Hildenborough was considered a quiet safe location, and children from London schools were evacuated to the Village School. In October 1939 there were 250 evacuees on the school roll. In the absence of air raids on London during this period of the "phoney war" many of these children returned home. The quiet was not to last.

In July 1940, the Battle of Britain got underway in the skies above Kent and the village became anything but quiet. Hildenborough is only ten miles from RAF Biggin Hill, an important airfield and a Sector headquarters co-ordinating airfields in Kent. Other airfields under Biggin Hill were at Gravesend some fifteen miles away and night fighters were at West Malling ten miles away. There were emergency landing strips in Stocks Green Road, Hildenborough less than a mile from the village centre and at Penshurst Airfield, Charcotte only three miles away. Most of the evacuees had left the village before the bombs started to fall.

On 6 September a Hurricane piloted by Flying Officer Bowring attacked a Junkers Ju 88 bomber and the pilot of the crippled plane ordered his radio operator to bail out. This was Corporal Heinrich Agel and he landed on the roof of the "Boiling Kettle" tea rooms. He was taken in by the owners and given tea and cakes while they waited for the police to arrive. The plane went on to crash-land at Tanyard Farm in Hadlow Road, Tonbridge. The crew of five was reunited at Tonbridge police station before being taken to a POW camp for the duration of the war.

On 11 September a twin-engine Heinkel He 111 bomber was shot down by two Hurricanes and crash-landed on the airstrip behind the Old Barn in Stocks Green Road. The Hurricanes circled to watch as the crew of five walked away from the wreckage and were captured by a group of soldiers.

27 October, a Sunday, started with a Spitfire Mk 11 (P7539) diving to earth behind the Half Moon pub killing the pilot John R. Mather. (Investigations of the crash site in the 1972 did not reveal any battle damage. The cause of the crash was probably mechanical failure). Later that day a Messerschmitt Bf 109 was shot and forced to land on Penshurst airfield, a temporary air-strip near Penshurst. The pilot of the Spitfire was Flying Officer Peter Chesters.

After this busy spell the village did not suffer from the war until one day in 1942 bombs fell on the "Grenadier Pub" in Riding Lane. There were no injuries; the landlord was safe in his cellar tapping a new barrel.

The village and surrounding area played host to American troops who all left the area in the follow-up from D-Day. The war returned in June 1944 with the first of the flying bombs. On 29 June a flying bomb damaged School House and there are numerous records of the disturbance caused by the flying bombs. The window in the north transept of St John's Church was blown out at this time. It became so dangerous in the village that in July children were evacuated in what was now called "Buzz Bomb Alley". There were other V-1 and V-2 events in the village but these are not well documented as many of these fell in fields. Ref.1 Hildenborough School Log book. Ref.2 Blazing Bomber to Boiling Kettle by Gordon Church. Bygone Kent Vol. II No. 5. Ref.3 Courier Newspaper 1972 Ref.4 "The Airmen's Stories – P/O P Chesters". Battle of Britain Museum. Retrieved 14 January 2010. Ref. 5 Courier Newspaper.

== Transport ==
Hildenborough stood on the first road in Kent to be turnpiked in 1710: the highway from Sevenoaks through Tonbridge to Tunbridge Wells; carrying much traffic en route to "the Wells". A number of inns sprang up to service this traffic, including the Hilden Manor and the Half Moon.

Today the village, along with Tonbridge and Sevenoaks, is by-passed by the modern A21 road.

The railway was late coming to Hildenborough: the South Eastern Railway did not open its direct line from London until 1 May 1868. The six-mile (ten-kilometre) gradient up to Sevenoaks takes its name from the village. The railway station was situated close to the existing houses at the time, which is now about one mile (one and a half kilometres) from the village centre. There are regular direct routes to London Bridge, London Waterloo East and London Charing Cross, taking approximately 30–45 minutes. In the opposite direction, direct trains go to Tonbridge, Tunbridge Wells and Hastings.

== Religion ==
By the 1840s, the Parish of Tonbridge was approximately 10 miles (16 km) long and 2 1/2 miles (4.0 km) wide. A circular letter dated 26 September 1842 explained that, "as the Parish was so large, a great many people were unable to attend the church [in nearby Tonbridge]." It was proposed that, "a new church should be built for the people living in the Hildenborough district." Dedicated to St. John the Evangelist, the church was consecrated on 9 July 1844.

In 1992 a "church plant" was established by St John's at Stocks Green School, to serve the southern part of the village, initially meeting monthly until 1994 when weekly services started. The congregation moved back to the Church Centre (hall) at St John's in 2008.

Hildenborough Gospel Hall, located in Mount Pleasant, was established some time around 1850.

The Soka Gakkai International and SGI-UK – a Buddhist group, meet in the Village Hall.

== Modern Hildenborough ==
Sackville School, a private educational establishment, now occupies Foxbush House, built in 1866 for Charles Fitch Kemp, a London chartered accountant, who had an "ambition to be a country landowner". The house was subsequently sold twice before the Second World War, when it was occupied by the military. It was used by various educational establishments from 1949; Sackville School was established in 1987 and its grounds are a Registered Historic Park.

Another private school, Fosse Bank, occupies a Grade II listed Victorian building known as Mountains Country House. The building and estate are also used as a wedding and event venue.

Commerce in the village is primarily based on small businesses. Fidelity Investments has been a major local employer, with its UK headquarters based in Hildenborough; however in 2017 the company announced that the site would be closing in 2020. GlaxoSmithKline was formerly a significant local employer, with a research factory at the Old Powder Mills, until the site was closed in 2010. Hildenborough is very much a commuter village with its good transport links with London.

One of the village's oldest buildings, the Hilden Manor restaurant owned by Whitbread, was burnt down by a fire caused by an electrical fault, and has now been restored and rebuilt by Oaklands. It was officially re-opened in 2006 with a Premier Inn hotel newly built next to it.

The village's GP practice can be traced back to 1879. The Hildenborough and Tonbridge Medical Group now has a large, purpose-built medical centre in Westwood which also houses a dispensary. The practice has over 16,000 patients, with branch surgeries in the villages of Leigh and Weald, as well as the Trenchwood Medical Centre in north Tonbridge.

The Raphael Medical Centre in Coldharbour Lane offers speech therapy and art and music therapy to help patients regain mental and physical abilities lost through serious illness or accidents.

In 2014 Dame Kelly Holmes opened Cafe 1809 on the main road through Hildenborough. In 2018 she closed the cafe and reopened it as The 1809 Hub space for community events.

Hildenborough has a weekly farmers' market which is held every Tuesday morning from 8:30 am to 11 am at the Hildenborough Village Hall in Riding Lane. The farmers' market opened in 2008 and as of 2024 hosted around 20 stalls each week.

== Education ==
There is one private primary school, Fosse Bank, one private secondary, Sackville, and two state primaries, Stocks Green school and Hildenborough CEP school. Hildenborough primary was the first school in the village, and is over 150 years old.

== Road safety ==
In 2015, after various anti speeding campaigns and to reduce fatalities and casualties in the village, the speed limit of the B245 Tonbridge Road and from Foxbush to the Hilden Manor was reduced from 40 to 30 mph. The speed limit had not been changed for 85 years. The speed limit on parts of Stocks Green Road was reduced from 60 mph to 40. There were also traffic calming alterations along Leigh Road by Stocks Green School.

Hildenborough Community Speedwatch, part of Kent Community Speedwatch, started by road safety activists in 2016 after concern for speeding in the village. Volunteers run regular speed checks in the village and in particular speeding hotspots. Their purpose is to educate motorists not to enforce.

Kent Police operate various road safety checks every so often in the village. In 2021, 21 motorists received speeding tickets. A wanted male was caught by Foxbush.

== Activities ==
There are several activities for children and teenagers, including those run by Hildenborough Church, and a Scout troop (8th Tonbridge). There are two football teams associated with Hildenborough Athletic FC, the reserves play in the local Sevenoaks & District League and the first team playing football in the Kent County Division One league as of 2011–2012 season.

Riding Farm Equestrian Centre on Riding Lane offers horse riding lessons, livery facilities and school holiday activities.

Action Medical Research have a regular charity cycling event, the 'Castle 100' every year that runs through Riding Lane and Shipbourne http://www.kent.gov.uk/leisure-and-culture/explore-kent/cycling/Tonbridge-Castle-charity-ride.htm On the first bank holiday Monday in May the Hildenborough Sports Association organises the Hildenborough Road Races Hildenborough Road Races. 2015 marks the 30th time the races have taken place.

Campaigners called for Hildenborough to have an outdoor gym in the Recreation Ground to encourage inexpensive exercise for adults including older and disabled people. It was opened by Dame Kelly Holmes on 31 October 2016. It was supported by local residents in a survey and funded by a Tesco grant and some local businesses and the Kent Police Property Fund. Extra equipment for the children's playground was also funded including the zip wire that local children from the Cubs asked for.

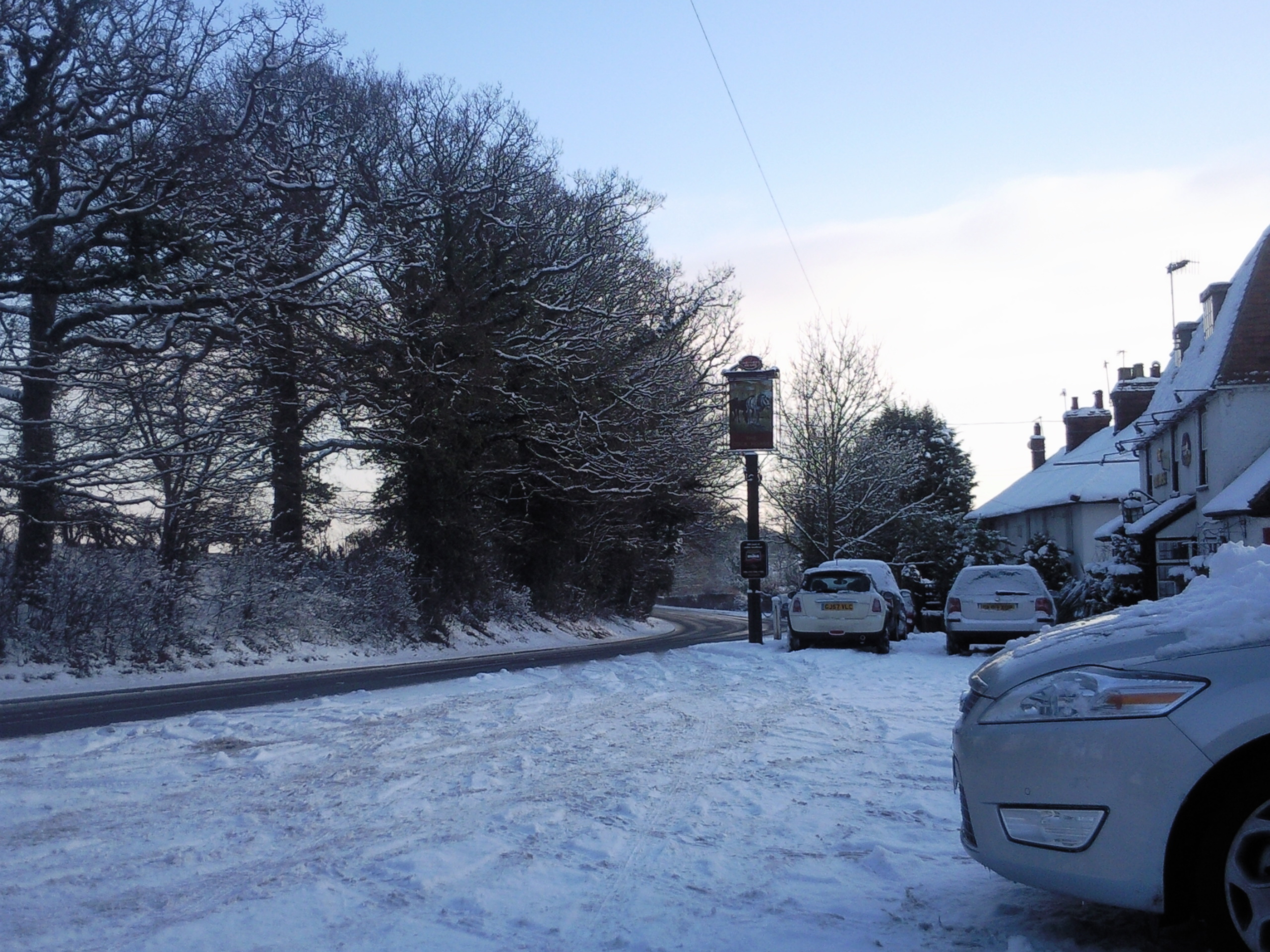
The Cock Horse Pub

== Notable residents ==
Hildenborough is the family home of Olympic double-gold medallist Dame Kelly Holmes. Other famous residents included the late Sir Henry Cooper.

Henry (real name Hyla) Stallard MBE (1901–73) lived in Mill Lane, he was an athlete in the 1924 Paris Olympics and represented Great Britain in the 800 and 1500m. He hurt his foot in one of the races but he picked himself up and carried on running. An actor played him in film Chariots of Fire. He became a pioneering eye surgeon at St Barts Hospital and Moorfields. He later moved with his wife Gywnneth to Forest Row in Sussex but used to spend Christmas in Hildenborough with his relatives.

World War I Victoria Cross recipient, William Allison White (1894–1974) has a memorial headstone in Hildenborough churchyard.

Andy Titterrell, England and British Lions rugby player lived in Hildenborough.

== Demography ==
Hildenborough compared
2001 UK Census	Hildenborough ward	Tonbridge and Malling borough	England
Population	4,588	107,561	49,138,831
Foreign born	5.7%	4.6%	9.2%
White	98.7%	98.3%	90.9%
Asian	0.4%	0.7%	4.6%
Black	0.1%	0.1%	2.3%
Christian	78.8%	76.1%	71.7%
Muslim	0.2%	0.3%	3.1%
Hindu	0.2%	0.2%	1.1%
No religion	12.6%	15%	14.6%
Unemployed	1.5%	1.9%	3.3%
Retired	17.1%	14.2%	13.5%

At the 2001 UK census, the Hildenborough electoral ward had a population of 4,588. The ethnicity was 98.7% white, 0.6% mixed race, 0.4% Asian, 0.1% black and 0.2% other. The place of birth of residents was 94.3% United Kingdom, 0.6% Republic of Ireland, 1.7% other Western European countries, and 3.4% elsewhere. Religion was recorded as 78.8% Christian, 0.1% Buddhist, 0.2% Hindu, 0% Sikh, 0.1% Jewish, and 0.2% Muslim. 12.6% were recorded as having no religion, 0.4% had an alternative religion and 7.6% did not state their religion.

The economic activity of residents aged 16–74 was 39.1% in full-time employment, 13.5% in part-time employment, 10.9% self-employed, 1.5% unemployed, 2.4% students with jobs, 3.2% students without jobs, 17.1% retired, 7.8% looking after home or family, 2.8% permanently sick or disabled and 1.7% economically inactive for other reasons. The industry of employment of residents was 13.4% retail, 9.3% manufacturing, 7.2% construction, 17.6% real estate, 9.2% health and social work, 10.2% education, 5.5% transport and communications, 3.9% public administration, 3.2% hotels and restaurants, 12.5% finance, 1.5% agriculture and 6.5% other. Compared with national figures, the ward had a relatively high proportion of workers in education, finance and real estate. There were a relatively low proportion in manufacturing, public administration, hotels and restaurants. Of the ward's residents aged 16–74, 25.9% had a higher education qualification or the equivalent, compared with 19.9% nationwide.

== See also ==
- Listed buildings in Hildenborough
