= George Cabot Lee Jr. =

American banker (1871–1950)

- Born: February 2, 1871; Boston, Massachusetts
- Died: October 28, 1950 (aged 79); Boston, Massachusetts
- Education: Harvard University
- Employer: Lee, Higginson & Co.
- Spouses: Madeline Jackson (m. 1898; died 1920) Gertrude Cramer Bartlett (m. 1926)
- Children: 3
- Parent(s): George Cabot Lee; Caroline Watts Haskell
- Relatives: Alice Hathaway Lee Roosevelt (sister); Alice Roosevelt Longworth (niece)
- Awards: Order of St. Sava

George Cabot Lee Jr. (February 2, 1871 – October 28, 1950) was an American banker from Boston. He was the brother of Alice Hathaway Lee, the first wife of President Theodore Roosevelt.

== Early life ==
Lee was born on February 2, 1871, in Boston, Massachusetts. He was a son of the Boston banker George Cabot Lee (1830–1910) and Caroline Watts (née Haskell) Lee (1835–1914). Among his sisters were Rose Lee (wife of Reginald Gray), Alice Hathaway Lee (first wife of Theodore Roosevelt), and Harriet Paine Lee (wife of Charles Mifflin Hammond, who managed William Howard Taft's campaign in California).

His paternal grandparents were John Clarke Lee, a member of the Cabot family, and Harriet Paine (née Rose) Lee. Through his sister Alice, he was uncle to Alice Roosevelt Longworth. His maternal grandparents were Elisha Haskell and Alice Russell (née Hathaway) Haskell.

Lee graduated from Harvard University in 1894 and served as treasurer of his class for thirty-one years.

== Career ==
On September 1, 1900, Lee joined the firm of Lee, Higginson & Co., which had been founded by his grandfather in 1848, and was admitted as a junior partner. He later served as president of the Lee, Higginson Safe Deposit Company. When the company decided to go out of business, he settled the firm's affairs.

Lee served as a director of the Revere Sugar Refinery, the Massachusetts Fire and Marine Insurance Company, the United Fruit Company, the U.S. Smelting and Refining Company, and the Ponce and Guayama Railroad in addition to serving as a trustee of the Central Aguirre Sugar Company, which operated the Central Aguirre refinery Guayama.

=== Philanthropic works ===
During World War I, Lee raised funds for the Allies and for the Red Cross, the YMCA, the Knights of Columbus among other philanthropic endeavors. Serbia awarded him the Order of St. Sava.

He also served as treasurer of the Boston Floating Hospital, was a trustee of the YMCA Boston, was a director of the Free Hospital for Women and was a fundraiser for the YWCA.

== Personal life ==
On November 17, 1898, Lee was married to Madeline Jackson (1878–1920), a daughter of James Jackson and Rebecca Nelson (née Borland) Jackson. Together, they were the parents of three sons:

- George Cabot Lee III (1899–1970), who married Kathleen Bowring Stoddart, a daughter of Lawrence Bowring Stoddart of Ewell Court, Surrey, in 1928.
- James Jackson Lee (1900–1972), who married Emily Schniewind, daughter of Henry Schniewind Jr., in 1926.
- Nelson Borland Lee (1906–1967), who married Mary Flagg.

After the death of his first wife, Lee remarried to Gertrude Wylde (née Cramer) Bartlett (1878–1971), the former wife of Edwin Bartlett, in Paris in July 1926.

Lee died on October 28, 1950, at his home in Westwood, Massachusetts. He was buried in Mount Auburn Cemetery in Cambridge.
