= George Leigh (disambiguation) =

George Leigh was an English politician.

George Leigh may also refer to:

- George Leigh (motorcyclist), in 1953 Grand Prix motorcycle racing season
- George Leigh, partner in predecessor of Sotheby's, as Baker & Leigh, 1767

== See also ==
- George Lee (disambiguation)
- George Legh, British MP
