= John Davison (English cricketer) =

English cricketer (1828–1871)

Personal information
- Full name: John Jennings Davison
- Born: 20 July 1828; Alkham, Kent
- Died: 10 May 1871 (aged 42); Leigh, Kent
- Batting: Right-handed
- Role: Wicket-keeper

Domestic team information
- Years: Team
- 1851–1860: Gentlemen of Kent
- 1860–1863: Kent
- FC debut: 30 June 1851 Gents of Kent v Gents of England
- Last FC: 22 June 1863 Kent v Surrey

Career statistics
Competition	First-class
Matches	7
Runs scored	98
Batting average	9.80
100s/50s	0/0
Top score	25*
Catches/stumpings	4/2
- Source: Cricinfo, 9 March 2017

John Jennings Davison (20 July 1828 – 10 May 1871) was an English cricketer. He played seven first-class matches between 1851 and 1863.

Davison was born at Alkham in Kent in 1828, the son of John and Elizabeth Davison (née Jennings). His father farmed and Davison farmed all of his life, first at the family farm at Alkham and later at Leigh.

A batsman and wicket-keeper, Davison is first known to have played cricket in 1851, playing club cricket in at least three matches for Canterbury Cricket Club. Later in the year he played for the Gentlemen of Kent against the Gentlemen of Sussex at the St Lawrence Ground in Canterbury and then at Lord's against the Gentlemen of England, a match given retrospective first-class status. He was known as a good batsman and generally batted close to the top of the order.

Davison did not appear in first-class cricket again until 1860, and six of his seven first-class matches took place in the period between then and 1863. Five of these were for Kent County Cricket Club, with the other match being a fixture between the Gentlemen of Kent and the Gentlemen of the Marylebone Cricket Club (MCC) during the 1860 Canterbury Cricket Week. He scored a total of 98 first-class runs, with his highest score of 25 not out coming in his final first-class match, an 1863 fixture against Surrey at Higher Common Ground in Tunbridge Wells.

Davison was a twin and his brother, William, also played cricket, although not at first-class level. He married Sarah Cross at Elham in 1861; the couple had two children. Davison died at Leigh in 1871 aged 42.

== Bibliography ==
- Carlaw, Derek (2020). Kent County Cricketers, A to Z: Part One (1806–1914) (PDF). Cardiff: ACS.
