= Alice Hathaway Roosevelt =

American socialite and the first wife of Theodore Roosevelt (1861–1884)

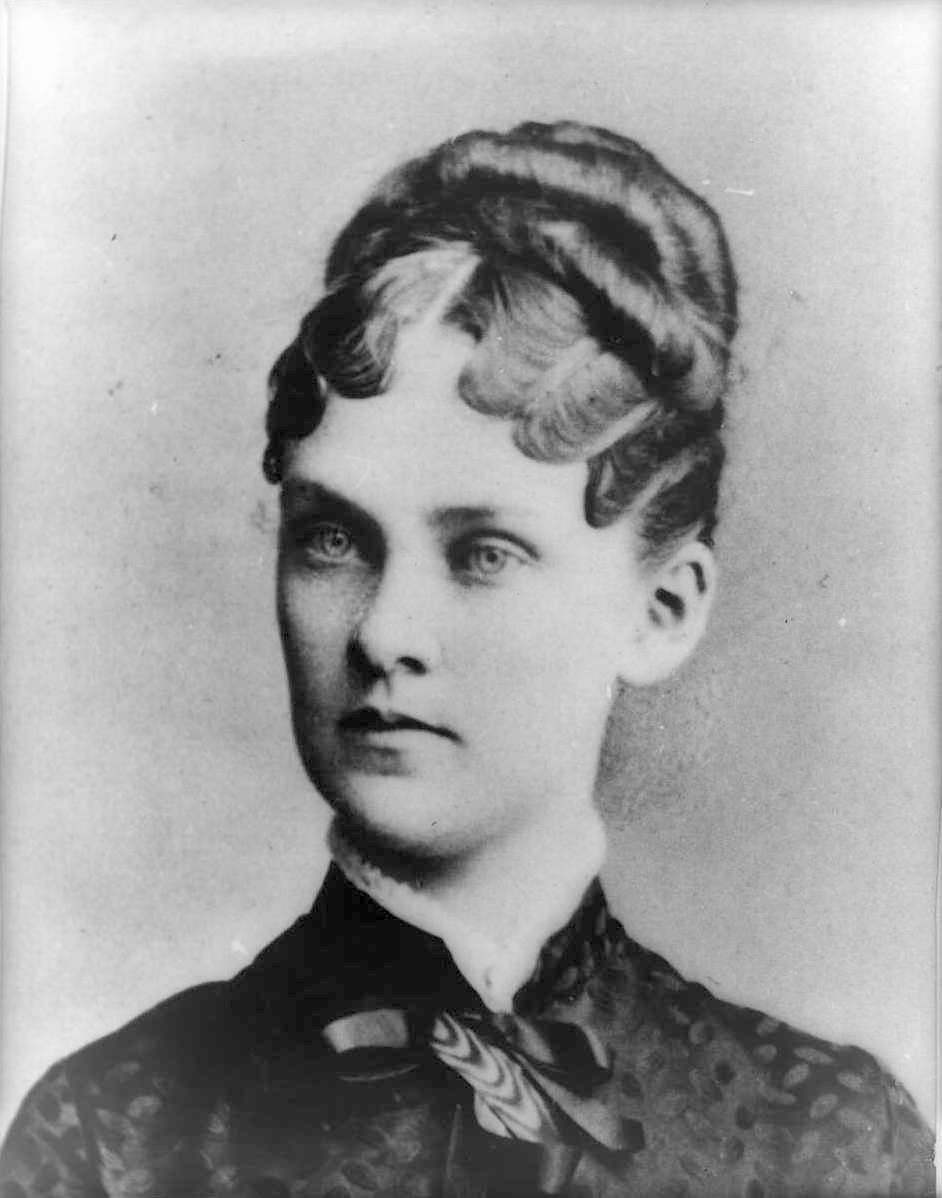
- Alice Hathaway Roosevelt, c. 1880–1884
- Born: Alice Hathaway Lee; July 29, 1861; Chestnut Hill, Massachusetts, U.S.
- Died: February 14, 1884 (aged 22); New York City, U.S.
- Resting place: Green-Wood Cemetery, New York City, U.S.
- Spouse: Theodore Roosevelt (m. 1880)
- Children: Alice Roosevelt Longworth
- Relatives: George Cabot Lee Jr. (brother)

Alice Hathaway Roosevelt (née Lee; July 29, 1861 – February 14, 1884) was an American socialite and the first wife of President Theodore Roosevelt. Two days after giving birth to their only child, she died from undiagnosed Bright's disease.

== Early life ==
Alice Hathaway Lee was born on July 29, 1861, in Chestnut Hill, Massachusetts, to banker George Cabot Lee and Caroline Watts Haskell. Her younger brother was banker George Cabot Lee Jr. and her grandfather was John Clarke Lee, founder of Lee, Higginson & Co. Standing 5'6", she had "blue-gray eyes and long, wavy golden hair" and was described as strikingly beautiful as well as charming. Her family and friends called her "Sunshine" because of her cheerful disposition.

== Courtship and marriage ==
Lee met Theodore Roosevelt on October 18, 1878, at the home of her relatives and next-door neighbors, the Saltonstalls. At Harvard University, Roosevelt was a classmate of her cousin, Richard Middlecott "Dick" Saltonstall. Later writing of their first encounter, Roosevelt said, "As long as I live, I shall never forget how sweetly she looked, and how prettily she greeted me."

Lee received a proposal of marriage from Roosevelt in June 1879 but waited eight months before accepting. Their engagement was announced on February 14, 1880.

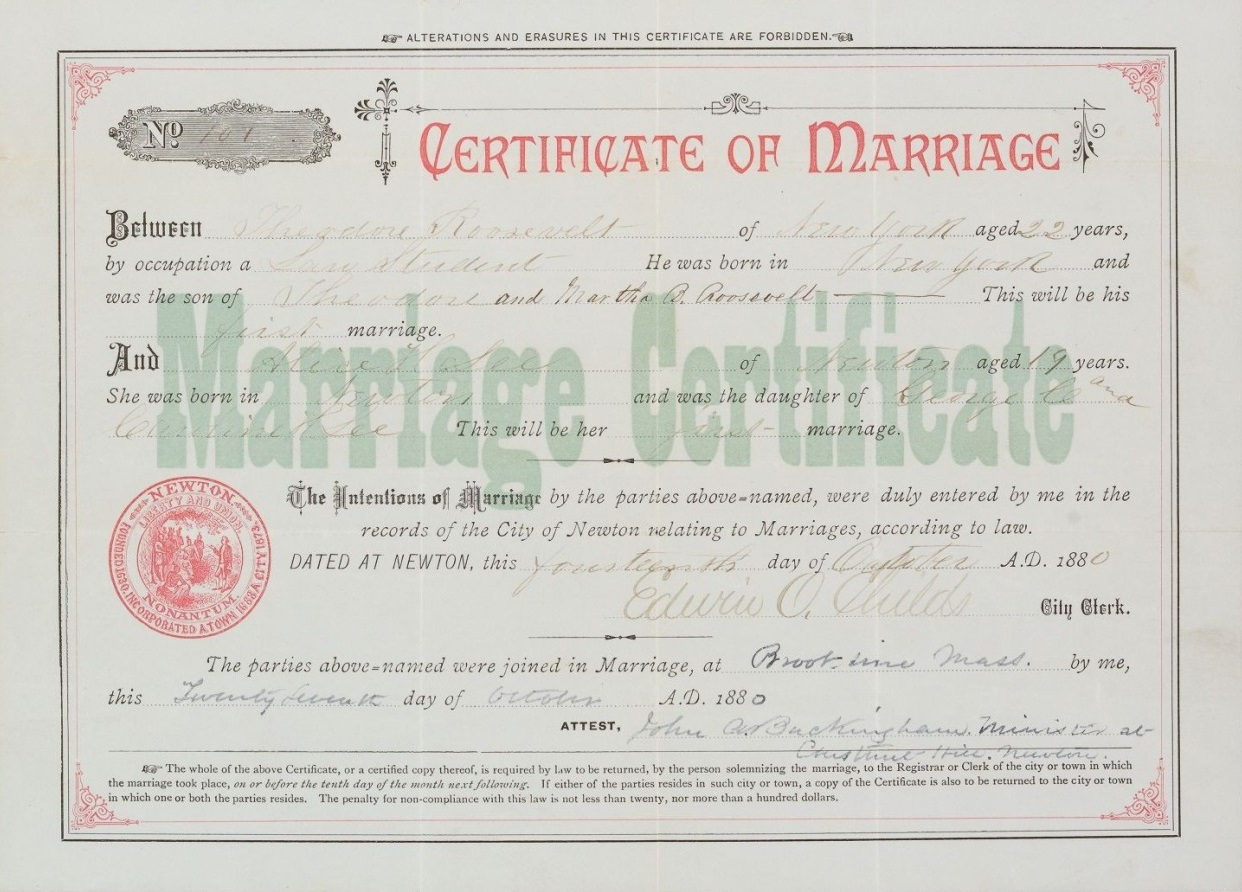
Marriage certificate of the Roosevelts, 1880

At age 19, Lee married Roosevelt on October 27, 1880 (T.R.'s 22nd birthday), at the Unitarian Church in Brookline, Massachusetts. The couple's "proper" honeymoon was delayed until the following summer due to her new husband's acceptance into Columbia Law School. After spending the first two weeks of their marriage at the Roosevelt family summer rental in Oyster Bay known as "Tranquility," the couple went to live with Theodore's widowed mother, Martha Stewart "Mittie" Bulloch.

Along with her new husband, Roosevelt participated in the social world of elite New York and toured Europe for five months in 1881. In October 1882 Roosevelt moved to her husband's Albany boardinghouse and learned about New York state politics. When she became pregnant in the summer of 1883, the Roosevelts planned for a large family and bought land near Tranquility for a large home. She returned to live with her mother-in-law in New York City later that fall.

== Death after childbirth ==
Roosevelt gave birth to the couple's daughter at 8:30 pm on February 12, 1884; the child was named Alice Lee Roosevelt. Her husband, then a member of the New York State Assembly, was in Albany attending to business on the Assembly floor. He had been convinced their child would be born on Valentine's Day, the fourth anniversary of their engagement. After Assemblyman Roosevelt received a telegram the morning of the 13th notifying him of the birth, he made arrangements to leave that afternoon and be with his wife. Another telegram was sent and received regarding her ill health; she was in a semi-comatose state by the time he arrived home, around midnight.

Roosevelt languished for several hours while her husband held her, ultimately dying on February 14, 1884, Valentine's Day afternoon, from undiagnosed kidney failure. It was determined that her pregnancy had masked the illness. Alice Roosevelt was 22 years old at the time of her death. Her mother-in-law, Martha Bulloch Roosevelt, died of typhoid on the same day in the same building.

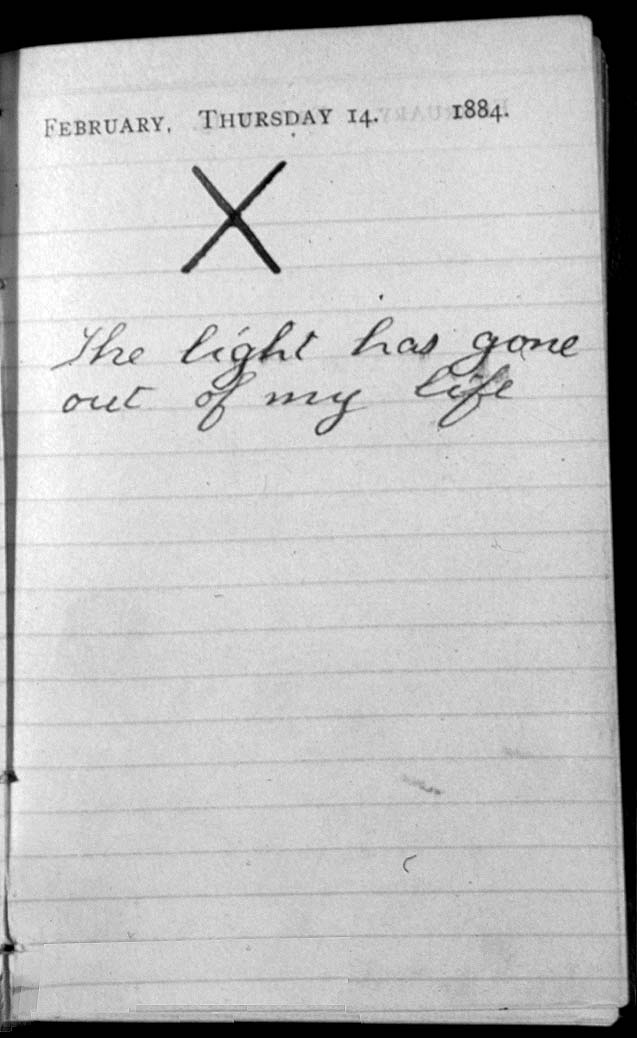
Roosevelt's diary entry "The light has gone out of my life"

Distraught following Alice Roosevelt's death, her husband hardly spoke of her again. Much to the frustration of their daughter, all Theodore Roosevelt revealed following his wife's death was a diary entry and a short, privately published tribute:

She was beautiful in face and form, and lovelier still in spirit; As a flower she grew, and as a fair beautiful young flower she died. Her life had been always in the sunshine; there had never come to her a single sorrow; and none ever knew her who did not love and revere her for the bright, sunny temper and her saintly unselfishness. Fair, pure, and joyous as a maiden; loving, tender, and happy. As a young wife; when she had just become a mother, when her life seemed to be just begun, and when the years seemed so bright before her—then, by a strange and terrible fate, death came to her. And when my heart's dearest died, the light went from my life forever.

In the immediate aftermath of his wife's death, Theodore Roosevelt turned the care of their newborn daughter, Alice Lee, over to his sister Bamie. Alice Lee learned of her mother primarily from Bamie Roosevelt and her maternal grandparents. Roosevelt never spoke to his daughter about her mother. He tore pages about his wife from his diary, and burned almost all the letters they had written to each other. Theodore Roosevelt and his second wife, Edith Kermit Carow, took custody of his daughter when she was three years old.

=== Burial ===
Roosevelt was buried in Green-Wood Cemetery in Brooklyn, New York, next to her mother-in-law Mittie, Theodore Roosevelt’s mother, who had died eleven hours earlier of typhoid fever. Both families held a joint funeral for the women at New York's Fifth Avenue Presbyterian Church.
