= Fairfax Fenwick =

New Zealand cricketer (1852–1920)

Personal information
- Full name: Fairfax Frederik Fenwick (Note: Fenwick's middle name is spelt Frederick in some sources.)
- Born: 8 September 1852; Elsinore, Denmark
- Died: 31 August 1920 (aged 67); Cobham, Kent, England
- Role: Wicket-keeper
- Relatives: Herbert Fenwick (brother)

Domestic team information
- Years: Team
- 1875/76: Otago

Career statistics
Competition	First-class
Matches	1
Runs scored	1
Batting average	0.50
100s/50s	0/0
Top score	1
Catches/stumpings	1/0
- Source: CricketArchive, 24 February 2015

Fairfax Frederik Fenwick (8 September 1852 – 31 August 1920) was a New Zealand cricketer who captained Otago in his only first-class match, during the 1875–76 season. He was born in Denmark, played his cricket in New Zealand, and died in England.

Fenwick was born in Elsinore, Denmark, in 1852 and educated at Christ's College, Christchurch and Otago Boys' High School at Dunedin, both in New Zealand. His sole match for Otago came against Canterbury in January 1876, at a time when interprovincial matches were relatively rare (the Plunket Shield not yet having been established). Replacing William Downes as captain from Otago's previous match (played almost a year beforehand), Fenwick came in sixth in the first innings, and was dismissed for a duck by Thomas Sweet, one of New Zealand's leading fast bowlers at the time. He demoted himself to ninth in the order for the team's second innings, but was again dismissed cheaply (by George Lee), scoring only one run as Otago lost the match by 145 runs.

Fenwick's younger brother, Herbert Shakespeare Fenwick, was also born in Denmark, and played first-class cricket for Canterbury. Before settling the family in Christchurch, their father, Charles Fenwick, was the consul of the Kingdom of Hanover in Denmark. Fairfax Fenwick had been named for his uncle, who held pastoral leases in Otago and, earlier, in the Colony of Victoria. The Fenwicks, originally from Kingston upon Hull, had been in Scandinavia since the early 18th century, and Charles Fenwick had Danish and German ancestry through his mother.

Fairfax Fenwick worked as a bank manager. He died at Cobham, Kent in England in 1920, aged 67.
