= Nordic New Zealanders =

New Zealanders with Nordic heritage

Total population
- c. 5,000

Languages
- English; Danish; Finnish; Icelandic; Norwegian; Swedish

Religion
- Lutheranism; Protestantism; Roman Catholicism; non-religion

Related ethnic groups
- Scandinavian Australians, other European New Zealanders

Nordic New Zealanders are New Zealand-born citizens whose origins are found in any of the Nordic countries (Denmark, Iceland, Norway, Sweden and Finland), or people from any of these countries who live in New Zealand.

== Countries of origin ==
This is a list of the countries of origin. The numbers indicate the people born in their home countries and people of Nordic descend born in New Zealand.

- (Denmark) Danish New Zealanders estimate: 1,986
- (Iceland) Icelandic New Zealanders estimate: 120
- (Norway) Norwegian New Zealanders estimate: 810
- (Sweden) Swedish New Zealanders estimate: 1,404
- (Finland) Finnish New Zealanders estimate: 783

== See also ==
- Europeans in Oceania
- Immigration to New Zealand
- Pākehā
