= George Lee (cricketer, born 1810) =

English cricketer

Personal information
- Born: 9 March 1810; Marylebone, London, England
- Died: 29 October 1894 (aged 84); St John's Wood, London, England
- Bowling: Slow
- Relatives: Henry Lee (brother)

Career statistics
Competition	First-class
Matches	3
Runs scored	4
Batting average	1.00
100s/50s	0/0
Top score	4
Balls bowled	172
Wickets	1
Bowling average	50.00
5 wickets in innings	0
10 wickets in match	0
Best bowling	1/32
Catches/stumpings	2/–
- Source: Cricinfo, 28 September 2018

George Lee (9 March 1810 – 29 October 1894) was an English first-class cricketer.

Born at Marylebone in October 1894, Lee made his debut in first-class cricket for the Slow Bowlers in the Slow Bowlers v Fast Bowlers fixture of 1842 at Lord's. He played two further first-class fixtures over the following 18 years, for the Surrey Club against the Marylebone Cricket Club in 1852 at Lord's, and for the Gentlemen of Marylebone Cricket Club against the Gentlemen of Kent in 1860 at Canterbury. He took just one wicket across his three first-class matches, that of John Davison in the Gentlemen of Marylebone Cricket Club v Gentlemen of Kent fixture. He had a more substantial impact as a first-class cricket umpire, standing in 44 matches between 1857–1876. He died at St John's Wood in October 1894.
