= Listed buildings in Leigh, Kent =

Civil Parish in Kent, England

Leigh is a village and civil parish in the Sevenoaks District of Kent, England. It contains three grade II* and 74 grade II listed buildings that are recorded in the National Heritage List for England.

This list is based on the information retrieved online from Historic England.

== Key ==
Grade	Criteria
I	Buildings that are of exceptional interest
II*	Particularly important buildings of more than special interest
II	Buildings that are of special interest

== Listing ==
Name	Grade	Location	Type	Completed (Note: The date given is the date used by Historic England as significant for the initial building or that of an important part in the structure's description.)	Date designated	Grid ref. (Note: The grid reference is based on the British national grid reference system, sometimes known as OSGB36, used by the Ordnance Survey.) Geo-coordinates	Notes	Entry number (Note: The "List Entry Number" is a unique number assigned to each listed building and scheduled monument by Historic England.)	Image	Wikidata
Charcotts Farmhouse	II	Charcott			16 January 1975	TQ5205147328; 51°12′18″N 0°10′31″E		1252468	Upload Photo	Q26544333
Forge Cottage Forge House	II	Charcott			16 January 1975	TQ5221347101; 51°12′10″N 0°10′39″E		1258583	Upload Photo	Q26549800
Jessups	II	Charcott			16 January 1975	TQ5238647158; 51°12′12″N 0°10′48″E		1273388	Upload Photo	Q26563138
Margavon Cottage the Cottage	II	Charcott			16 January 1975	TQ5215947138; 51°12′12″N 0°10′36″E		1258779	Upload Photo	Q26549982
Applebys	II	Chiddingstone Causeway			16 January 1975	TQ5261646606; 51°11′54″N 0°10′59″E		1258585	Upload Photo	Q26549802
Barn to North of Whitepost Farmhouse	II	Chiddingstone Causeway			16 January 1975	TQ5221546509; 51°11′51″N 0°10′38″E		1258584	Upload Photo	Q26549801
Whitepost Farmhouse	II	Chiddingstone Causeway			16 January 1975	TQ5222746475; 51°11′50″N 0°10′38″E		1273260	Upload Photo	Q26563020
Church Hill House	II	Church Hill			16 January 1975	TQ5484446534; 51°11′49″N 0°12′53″E		1273265	Upload Photo	Q26563025
The White House	II	Church Hill			16 January 1975	TQ5483946518; 51°11′49″N 0°12′53″E		1273389	The White House More images	Q26563139
Little Moorden	II	Cinder Hill Lane, Little Moorden			12 December 1980	TQ5284646129; 51°11′38″N 0°11′10″E		1244183	Upload Photo	Q26536815
Leigh Park Farmhouse	II	Coppings Road, Leigh Park Farm			16 January 1975	TQ5355947625; 51°12′26″N 0°11′49″E		1258581	Upload Photo	Q26549798
Wickhurst Farmhouse Old Wing Only	II	Coppings Road, Wickhurst Farm			16 January 1975	TQ5269947877; 51°12′35″N 0°11′05″E		1258763	Upload Photo	Q26549967
Pond Cottage	II	Eggpie Lane			16 January 1975	TQ5398949562; 51°13′28″N 0°12′14″E		1273387	Upload Photo	Q26563137
Yew Tree Cottage	II	Eggpie Lane			16 January 1975	TQ5403649565; 51°13′28″N 0°12′16″E		1258582	Upload Photo	Q26549799
Barn to South West of Paul's Farm House	II	Ensfield Road, Paul's Farm			3 May 1988	TQ5442846090; 51°11′35″N 0°12′31″E		1244218	Upload Photo	Q26536850
Killick's Bank	II	Ensfield Road, Killick's Bank			16 January 1975	TQ5419344969; 51°10′59″N 0°12′17″E		1258827	Upload Photo	Q26550025
Paul's Farmhouse	II*	Ensfield Road, Paul's Farm			10 September 1954	TQ5445246130; 51°11′37″N 0°12′32″E		1258824	Upload Photo	Q17545748
1 to 7, Forge Square	II	1 To 7, Forge Square, The Green, TN11 8QR			16 January 1975	TQ5490246573; 51°11′51″N 0°12′56″E		1258857	Upload Photo	Q26550050
British Legion Hall	II	High Street			16 January 1975	TQ5469046349; 51°11′44″N 0°12′45″E		1273358	British Legion Hall More images	Q26563110
Chilling House	II	High Street			16 January 1975	TQ5482646458; 51°11′47″N 0°12′52″E		1273357	Chilling House More images	Q26563109
Estate Office and Workshop to South of Hall Place with Peacock House	II	High Street, Hall Place			8 February 1974	TQ5444946664; 51°11′54″N 0°12′33″E		1273238	Upload Photo	Q26563002
Fleur De Lis Cottages Fleur De Lis Public House	II	1 and 2, High Street			16 January 1975	TQ5464846381; 51°11′45″N 0°12′43″E		1258595	Upload Photo	Q26549812
Forecourt Walls in Front of British Legion Hall and Village Hall	II	High Street			16 January 1975	TQ5466846400; 51°11′45″N 0°12′44″E		1273359	Upload Photo	Q26563111
Garden Walls to South of Hall Place	II	High Street, Hall Place			8 February 1974	TQ5441646620; 51°11′53″N 0°12′31″E		1258898	Upload Photo	Q26550082
Hall Place	II	High Street, Hall Place			8 February 1974	TQ5448246711; 51°11′55″N 0°12′35″E		1258589	Upload Photo	Q26549806
Leigh Club	II	High Street			16 January 1975	TQ5468446352; 51°11′44″N 0°12′45″E		1258593	Upload Photo	Q26549810
Lower Mead Cottage and the Firs	II	High Street			16 January 1975	TQ5449646401; 51°11′45″N 0°12′35″E		1258596	Upload Photo	Q26549813
Oak Cottages	II	1-3, High Street			16 January 1975	TQ5445946413; 51°11′46″N 0°12′33″E		1258597	Upload Photo	Q26549814
Old Brickmakers	II	High Street			16 January 1975	TQ5461346391; 51°11′45″N 0°12′41″E		1273360	Upload Photo	Q26563112
Orchard House	II	High Street			16 January 1975	TQ5485046473; 51°11′47″N 0°12′53″E		1258591	Orchard House More images	Q26549808
Park View Cottage and West Cottage	II	High Street, TN11 8RL			16 January 1975	TQ5470946396; 51°11′45″N 0°12′46″E		1258592	Upload Photo	Q26549809
South Wall to Hall Place Park	II	High Street, Hall Place			16 January 1975	TQ5459846408; 51°11′46″N 0°12′40″E		1258588	Upload Photo	Q26549805
Southdown House the Square	II	High Street			16 January 1975	TQ5478046422; 51°11′46″N 0°12′50″E		1258914	Upload Photo	Q26550095
Stable Block to South West of Hall Place	II	High Street, Hall Place			8 February 1974	TQ5439746642; 51°11′53″N 0°12′30″E		1258590	Upload Photo	Q26549807
Terrace Walls and Gates to North West of Hall Place	II	High Street, Hall Place			8 February 1974	TQ5447446777; 51°11′58″N 0°12′35″E		1273234	Upload Photo	Q26562999
The Old Lodge	II	High Street			16 January 1975	TQ5441046471; 51°11′48″N 0°12′31″E		1273355	The Old Lodge More images	Q26563107
Village Hall	II	High Street			16 January 1975	TQ5468246378; 51°11′44″N 0°12′45″E		1258594	Upload Photo	Q26549811
Walls and Steps to Terrace Around North and East Sides of Hall Place	II	High Street, Hall Place			8 February 1974	TQ5453146732; 51°11′56″N 0°12′37″E		1273356	Upload Photo	Q26563108
Walls in Front of the Old Lodge	II	High Street			16 January 1975	TQ5440846466; 51°11′48″N 0°12′31″E		1258871	Upload Photo	Q26550063
Waterworks	II	High Street			30 October 1985	TQ5467746312; 51°11′42″N 0°12′44″E		1272507	Upload Photo	Q26562340
Well House	II	High Street, TN11 8RL			16 January 1975	TQ5470146404; 51°11′45″N 0°12′46″E		1258916	Upload Photo	Q26550096
Church of St Mary	II*	Hildenborough Road			10 September 1954	TQ5487646618; 51°11′52″N 0°12′55″E		1258950	Church of St Mary More images	Q17545755
Dairy Building to North of Home Farmhouse	II	Hildenborough Road, Home Farm			16 January 1975	TQ5515747235; 51°12′12″N 0°13′10″E		1258601	Upload Photo	Q26549818
Home Farm Cottage	II	Hildenborough Road, Home Farm			16 January 1975	TQ5515147163; 51°12′09″N 0°13′10″E		1273193	Upload Photo	Q26562963
Home Farmhouse	II	Hildenborough Road, Home Farm			16 January 1975	TQ5516447218; 51°12′11″N 0°13′11″E		1258600	Upload Photo	Q26549817
Large Barn to West of Home Farmhouse	II	Hildenborough Road, Home Farm			16 January 1975	TQ5511947197; 51°12′11″N 0°13′08″E		1258602	Upload Photo	Q26549819
Laundry Cottage	II	Hildenborough Road			6 October 1981	TQ5538347448; 51°12′18″N 0°13′22″E		1271895	Upload Photo	Q26561791
Lodge and Gateway to Hall Place	II	Hildenborough Road, Hall Place			16 January 1975	TQ5491146658; 51°11′53″N 0°12′57″E		1258948	Upload Photo	Q26550126
Old Kennards	II	Hildenborough Road			16 January 1975	TQ5510346649; 51°11′53″N 0°13′07″E		1258599	Upload Photo	Q26549816
Porcupine House	II	Hildenborough Road			16 January 1975	TQ5492446688; 51°11′54″N 0°12′58″E		1258603	Porcupine House More images	Q26549820
The Woods	II	Hildenborough Road			10 September 1954	TQ5520447189; 51°12′10″N 0°13′13″E		1258598	Upload Photo	Q26549815
Wall and Lych Gate to Church of St Mary	II	Hildenborough Road			16 January 1975	TQ5491946651; 51°11′53″N 0°12′57″E		1258604	Upload Photo	Q26549821
Granary to South of Moorden Farmhouse	II	Moorden			16 January 1975	TQ5233146013; 51°11′35″N 0°10′43″E		1259001	Upload Photo	Q26550170
Large Barn to South West of Moorden Farmhouse	II	Moorden			16 January 1975	TQ5227846011; 51°11′35″N 0°10′40″E		1259002	Upload Photo	Q26550171
Moorden Farmhouse	II	Moorden			16 January 1975	TQ5230146039; 51°11′36″N 0°10′42″E		1273167	Upload Photo	Q26562942
Former Cricket Ball Factory in the Grounds of the Paddocks	II	Penshurst Road			23 October 1990	TQ5254645362; 51°11′14″N 0°10′53″E		1244265	Upload Photo	Q26536894
Park Walls Flanking Penshurst Lodge and Entrance to Hall Place	II	Penshurst Road, Hall Place			16 January 1975	TQ5385946378; 51°11′45″N 0°12′02″E		1258958	Upload Photo	Q26550135
Penshurst Lodge and Gateway to Hall Place	II	Penshurst Road, Hall Place			16 January 1975	TQ5387146388; 51°11′46″N 0°12′03″E		1273361	Upload Photo	Q26563113
The Paddocks	II	Penshurst Road			16 January 1975	TQ5255945355; 51°11′13″N 0°10′54″E		1258605	Upload Photo	Q26549822
Greenacres	II	Philpots Road			16 January 1975	TQ5399148479; 51°12′53″N 0°12′12″E		1273285	Upload Photo	Q26563043
Barn at Little Barnetts Farm	II	Powder Mill Lane, Little Barnetts			10 July 1991	TQ5589146484; 51°11′47″N 0°13′47″E		1244277	Upload Photo	Q26536906
Coach House to East of Ramhurst Manor House	II	Powder Mill Lane, Ramhurst Manor			10 September 1954	TQ5642146704; 51°11′53″N 0°14′15″E		1273363	Upload Photo	Q26563115
Double Barn to East of Great Barnetts	II	Powder Mill Lane			7 July 1976	TQ5554246501; 51°11′48″N 0°13′29″E		1244182	Upload Photo	Q26536814
Gales Green Ways Cottage	II	Powder Mill Lane			16 January 1975	TQ5512846542; 51°11′49″N 0°13′08″E		1258606	Upload Photo	Q26549823
Granary to North West of Great Barnetts Farmhouse	II	Powder Mill Lane			16 January 1975	TQ5548246538; 51°11′49″N 0°13′26″E		1273362	Upload Photo	Q26563114
Great Barnetts Farmhouse	II	Powder Mill Lane			10 September 1954	TQ5549546510; 51°11′48″N 0°13′27″E		1258981	Upload Photo	Q26550155
Little Barnetts Farmhouse	II	Powder Mill Lane			16 January 1975	TQ5586346473; 51°11′46″N 0°13′46″E		1258607	Upload Photo	Q26549824
Mounting Block at Entrance to Great Barnetts Farmhouse	II	Powder Mill Lane			16 January 1975	TQ5548846485; 51°11′47″N 0°13′26″E		1273187	Upload Photo	Q26562960
Ramhurst Manor House	II*	Powder Mill Lane, Ramhurst Manor			10 September 1954	TQ5638746705; 51°11′53″N 0°14′13″E		1258987	Upload Photo	Q17545758
Wall to East and South of Garden to Ramhurst Manor House	II	Powder Mill Lane, Ramhurst Manor			16 January 1975	TQ5640746690; 51°11′53″N 0°14′14″E		1273364	Upload Photo	Q26563116
Elizabeth's Cottage	II	The Green			16 January 1975	TQ5498946420; 51°11′46″N 0°13′01″E		1258856	Upload Photo	Q26550049
Forge House	II	The Green, TN11 8QR			16 January 1975	TQ5489646534; 51°11′49″N 0°12′56″E		1273231	Forge House More images	Q26562996
Old Chimneys	II	The Green, TN11 8QL			10 September 1954	TQ5513546492; 51°11′48″N 0°13′08″E		1258586	Upload Photo	Q26549803
Old Wood Cottage	II	The Green			16 January 1975	TQ5511846514; 51°11′48″N 0°13′07″E		1273390	Upload Photo	Q26563140
South View	II	The Green, TN11 8QR			16 January 1975	TQ5492346582; 51°11′51″N 0°12′57″E		1258587	Upload Photo	Q26549804
The Forge	II	The Green, TN11 8QR			16 January 1975	TQ5490546547; 51°11′50″N 0°12′56″E		1273391	The Forge More images	Q26563141

== See also ==
- Grade I listed buildings in Kent
- Grade II* listed buildings in Kent

== Sources ==
- Newman, John (2012) [1969], Kent: West and the Weald, The Buildings of England, New Haven and London: Yale University Press, ISBN 978-0-300-18509-6
