= Listed buildings in Hildenborough =

Civil Parish in Kent, England

Hildenborough is a village and civil parish in the Tonbridge and Malling district of Kent, England. It contains 106 listed buildings that are recorded in the National Heritage List for England. Of these three are grade II* and 103 are grade II.

This list is based on the information retrieved online from Historic England.

== Key ==
Grade	Criteria
I	Buildings that are of exceptional interest
II*	Particularly important buildings of more than special interest
II	Buildings that are of special interest

== Listing ==
Name	Grade	Location	Type	Completed (Note: The date given is the date used by Historic England as significant for the initial building or that of an important part in the structure's description.)	Date designated	Grid ref. (Note: The grid reference is based on the British national grid reference system, sometimes known as OSGB36, used by the Ordnance Survey.) Geo-coordinates	Notes	Entry number (Note: The "List Entry Number" is a unique number assigned to each listed building and scheduled monument by Historic England.)	Image	Wikidata
Cattle Shed and Pig Sties Immediately South East of the Threshing Barn at Rumshed Farm	II				19 February 1990	TQ5512951792; 51°14′39″N 0°13′16″E		1277846	Upload Photo	Q26567229
Longholt and the Wing	II				19 February 1990	TQ5649950217; 51°13′47″N 0°14′24″E		1248586	Upload Photo	Q26540789
Pool South East of Nizels House, Between the Buddha and Sunken Gardens	II	Nizels Lane			19 February 1990	TQ5444250269; 51°13′51″N 0°12′38″E		1248252	Upload Photo	Q26540478
1-4 Club Cottages	II	1-4, Club Cottages, Riding Lane, TN11 9LJ			19 February 1990	TQ5675249528; 51°13′24″N 0°14′36″E		1070415	Upload Photo	Q26324277
5-8 Club Cottages	II	5-8, Club Cottages, Riding Lane, TN11 9LJ			19 February 1990	TQ5675849558; 51°13′25″N 0°14′37″E		1070377	Upload Photo	Q26324202
St Raphael Medical Centre	II	Coldharbour Lane			19 February 1990	TQ5714349214; 51°13′14″N 0°14′56″E		1070423	Upload Photo	Q26324291
The Trench	II	Coldharbour Lane			19 February 1990	TQ5769749546; 51°13′24″N 0°15′25″E		1247988	Upload Photo	Q26540238
The White House	II	2, Coldharbour Lane			19 February 1990	TQ5703948680; 51°12′57″N 0°14′50″E		1247990	Upload Photo	Q26540240
Trench Farmhouse	II	Coldharbour Lane			19 February 1990	TQ5775549668; 51°13′28″N 0°15′28″E		1363163	Upload Photo	Q26645002
Durhams Farmhouse	II	Eggpie Lane			19 February 1990	TQ5425049072; 51°13′12″N 0°12′27″E		1070424	Upload Photo	Q26324293
Muddle Cottage	II	Eggpie Lane			19 February 1990	TQ5412749117; 51°13′14″N 0°12′20″E		1247999	Upload Photo	Q26540249
Gate Piers, Gate and Flanking Walls to the Drive to Nizels House	II	Nizels Lane			19 February 1990	TQ5465350379; 51°13′54″N 0°12′49″E		1070403	Upload Photo	Q26324253
Gatepiers, Gates, Garden Walls and Pool North West and West of Nizels House	II	Nizels Lane			19 February 1990	TQ5441750310; 51°13′52″N 0°12′37″E		1248248	Upload Photo	Q26540474
Barn Immediately West of Latters Farmhouse	II	Hilden Avenue			19 February 1990	TQ5804448129; 51°12′38″N 0°15′40″E		1070425	Upload Photo	Q26324295
34 and 36, Leigh Road	II	34 and 36, Leigh Road			19 February 1990	TQ5710548205; 51°12′41″N 0°14′52″E		1263841	Upload Photo	Q26554601
Avalon	II	Leigh Road			19 February 1990	TQ5634347438; 51°12′17″N 0°14′12″E		1070411	Upload Photo	Q26324269
Outbuilding Immediately North East of Avalon	II	Leigh Road			19 February 1990	TQ5635147463; 51°12′18″N 0°14′12″E		1248424	Upload Photo	Q26540640
Spring House	II*	Leigh Road, Tonbridge, TN11 9AH			20 October 1954	TQ5665747240; 51°12′10″N 0°14′28″E		1277921	Upload Photo	Q26567300
Springwater Cottage	II	Leigh Road			19 February 1990	TQ5712348246; 51°12′43″N 0°14′53″E		1363164	Upload Photo	Q26645003
Stable Block North East of Avalon	II	Leigh Road			19 February 1990	TQ5637247482; 51°12′19″N 0°14′13″E		1070412	Upload Photo	Q26324271
122, London Road	II	122, London Road			19 February 1990	TQ5720248420; 51°12′48″N 0°14′58″E		1070431	Upload Photo	Q26324308
192 and 190, London Road	II	192 and 190, London Road			19 February 1990	TQ5653548802; 51°13′01″N 0°14′24″E		1070429	Upload Photo	Q26324304
Coach House Immediately North East of Oakhill Lawn	II	London Road			19 February 1990	TQ5718448452; 51°12′49″N 0°14′57″E		1070430	Upload Photo	Q26324306
Francis Cottages	II	London Road, Watts Cross			19 February 1990	TQ5560749557; 51°13′26″N 0°13′37″E		1363180	Upload Photo	Q26645019
Hilden Cottages	II	83 and 85, London Road			19 February 1990	TQ5761048116; 51°12′38″N 0°15′18″E		1248073	Upload Photo	Q26540316
Lodge at the Entrance to Sackville School	II	London Road			19 February 1990	TQ5647548785; 51°13′01″N 0°14′21″E		1248171	Upload Photo	Q26540407
Milestone at 552 502	II	London Road			19 February 1990	TQ5518950109; 51°13′45″N 0°13′17″E		1070426	Upload Photo	Q26324297
Milestone at 563 489	II	London Road			19 February 1990	TQ5625948950; 51°13′06″N 0°14′10″E		1248013	Upload Photo	Q26540261
Milestone at 576 482	II	London Road			19 February 1990	TQ5764148120; 51°12′38″N 0°15′20″E		1070432	Upload Photo	Q26324310
Oakhill Lawn	II	London Road			19 February 1990	TQ5717548446; 51°12′49″N 0°14′56″E		1248036	Upload Photo	Q26540282
Pembroke Lodge	II	London Road			19 February 1990	TQ5667848740; 51°12′59″N 0°14′31″E		1363165	Upload Photo	Q26645004
Quince Cottage	II	London Road			19 February 1990	TQ5718448437; 51°12′49″N 0°14′57″E		1248039	Upload Photo	Q26540285
Sackville School	II	London Road			19 February 1990	TQ5635848695; 51°12′58″N 0°14′15″E		1248630	Upload Photo	Q99937488
The Flying Dutchman Public House	II	London Road			19 February 1990	TQ5722748420; 51°12′48″N 0°14′59″E		1248051	Upload Photo	Q26540295
Cartshed About 75 Metres North West of Lower Street Farmhouse	II	Lower Street			19 February 1990	TQ5455148216; 51°12′44″N 0°12′41″E		1248635	Upload Photo	Q26540831
Cartshed Immediately North East of Little Lucy's Cottage	II	Lower Street			19 February 1990	TQ5544348205; 51°12′43″N 0°13′27″E		1070396	Upload Photo	Q26324239
Childrens Oast	II	Lower Street, Tonbridge, TN11 8PT			19 February 1990	TQ5457748153; 51°12′42″N 0°12′42″E		1277834	Upload Photo	Q26567219
Ivy Cottage	II	Lower Street			19 February 1990	TQ5468548154; 51°12′42″N 0°12′48″E		1248190	Upload Photo	Q26540424
Little Lucys Cottage	II	Lower Street			19 February 1990	TQ5542448190; 51°12′42″N 0°13′26″E		1363168	Upload Photo	Q26645007
Lucy's Farmhouse	II	Lower Street			19 February 1990	TQ5540648202; 51°12′43″N 0°13′25″E		1363186	Upload Photo	Q26645024
Reams Farmhouse	II	Lower Street			19 February 1990	TQ5494948162; 51°12′42″N 0°13′01″E		1070397	Upload Photo	Q26324241
Summerthorn Farmhouse	II	Lower Street, Tonbridge Kent, TN11 8PT			19 February 1990	TQ5457148176; 51°12′43″N 0°12′42″E		1248178	Upload Photo	Q26540413
The Bungalow	II	Lower Street			19 February 1990	TQ5433948339; 51°12′48″N 0°12′30″E		1070435	Upload Photo	Q26324316
The Old Barn	II	Lower Street, Tonbridge, TN11 8PT			19 February 1990	TQ5460948168; 51°12′42″N 0°12′44″E		1070436	Upload Photo	Q26324318
Barn About 20 Metres West of Lime Farmhouse	II	Mill Lane			19 February 1990	TQ5586449645; 51°13′29″N 0°13′51″E		1363188	Upload Photo	Q26645026
Bassetts Cottage and Asturias Cottage	II	Mill Lane			19 February 1990	TQ5596649658; 51°13′29″N 0°13′56″E		1363189	Upload Photo	Q26645027
Great Hollanden House	II	Mill Lane			19 February 1990	TQ5640350843; 51°14′07″N 0°14′20″E		1277837	Upload Photo	Q26567221
Hay Barn About 20 Metres North of Limes Farmhouse	II	Mill Lane			19 February 1990	TQ5587949648; 51°13′29″N 0°13′51″E		1070400	Upload Photo	Q26324247
Limes Farmhouse	II	Mill Lane			19 February 1990	TQ5588949619; 51°13′28″N 0°13′52″E		1070398	Upload Photo	Q26324243
Oasthouse About 50 Metres South West of Limes Farmhouse	II	Mill Lane			19 February 1990	TQ5584549612; 51°13′28″N 0°13′50″E		1363187	Upload Photo	Q26645025
Remains of Windmill in the Garden of the Old Mill House	II	Mill Lane			20 October 1954	TQ5589749358; 51°13′20″N 0°13′52″E		1070401	Upload Photo	Q26324249
Stables About 45 Metres West of Limes Farmhouse	II	Mill Lane			19 February 1990	TQ5582749632; 51°13′29″N 0°13′49″E		1070399	Upload Photo	Q26324245
The Lodge, Nizels	II	Nizels, Nizels Lane			19 February 1990	TQ5459950398; 51°13′55″N 0°12′47″E		1070402	Upload Photo	Q26324251
Iron's Lane Cottage	II	Nizels Lane			19 February 1990	TQ5424749928; 51°13′40″N 0°12′28″E		1070404	Upload Photo	Q26324255
Keepers Cottage	II	Nizels Lane			19 February 1990	TQ5451650052; 51°13′43″N 0°12′42″E		1248262	Upload Photo	Q26540488
Mansers	II	Nizels Lane			26 June 1980	TQ5473049525; 51°13′26″N 0°12′52″E		1248266	Upload Photo	Q26540492
Mansers Farmhouse	II	Nizels Lane			19 February 1990	TQ5467849570; 51°13′28″N 0°12′49″E		1363153	Upload Photo	Q26644994
Nizels Cottage	II*	Nizels Lane			20 October 1954	TQ5461950451; 51°13′56″N 0°12′48″E		1248222	Upload Photo	Q17547009
Nizels Farm Cottage	II	Nizels Lane			19 February 1990	TQ5452650091; 51°13′45″N 0°12′42″E		1070405	Upload Photo	Q26324257
Nizels Hoath	II	Nizels Lane			19 February 1990	TQ5473750402; 51°13′55″N 0°12′54″E		1248290	Upload Photo	Q26540512
Nizels House	II	Nizels Lane			19 February 1990	TQ5445150289; 51°13′51″N 0°12′39″E		1363190	Upload Photo	Q26645028
The Cottage	II	Nizels Lane			19 February 1990	TQ5457350325; 51°13′52″N 0°12′45″E		1248260	Upload Photo	Q26540486
Walls and Steps to the Buddha Garden Immediately East of Nizel's House	II	Nizels Lane			19 February 1990	TQ5447250269; 51°13′51″N 0°12′40″E		1277993	Upload Photo	Q26567366
Gate Piers and Pair of Gates at the Entrance to Mountains	II	Noble Tree Road			19 February 1990	TQ5619448875; 51°13′04″N 0°14′06″E		1248299	Upload Photo	Q26540521
Little Foxbush	II	Noble Tree Road			19 February 1990	TQ5626348882; 51°13′04″N 0°14′10″E		1277954	Upload Photo	Q26567329
Mountains	II	Noble Tree Road			19 February 1990	TQ5608948701; 51°12′58″N 0°14′01″E		1363154	Upload Photo	Q26644995
Mountains Lodge	II	Noble Tree Road			19 February 1990	TQ5618448872; 51°13′04″N 0°14′06″E		1070406	Upload Photo	Q26324259
Stable Block and Carriage House Including Walls to the South East, North of Mountains Lodge	II	North Of Mountains Lodge, Noble Tree Road			19 February 1990	TQ5616548874; 51°13′04″N 0°14′05″E		1070407	Upload Photo	Q26324261
Outbuilding Immediately North East of Oldhouse Farmhouse	II	Oldhouse Farmhouse, Philpots Lane, TN11 8PB			19 February 1990	TQ5457448836; 51°13′04″N 0°12′43″E		1070408	Upload Photo	Q26324263
Barn Immediately West of Old House	II	Philpots Lane			19 February 1990	TQ5524848814; 51°13′03″N 0°13′18″E		1248406	Upload Photo	Q26540622
Oldhouse Farmhouse	II	Philpots Lane, TN11 8PB			19 February 1990	TQ5455348816; 51°13′03″N 0°12′42″E		1248329	Upload Photo	Q26540550
Philpots	II	Philpots Lane			19 February 1990	TQ5487948910; 51°13′06″N 0°12′59″E		1363155	Upload Photo	Q26644996
The Old House	II*	Philpots Lane, TN11 8PA			20 October 1954	TQ5527248813; 51°13′03″N 0°13′19″E		1363156	Upload Photo	Q17547126
Tips Cross Cottage	II	Philpots Lane			19 February 1990	TQ5427548613; 51°12′57″N 0°12′27″E		1248361	Upload Photo	Q26540581
Barn Immediately South of the Plough Inn	II	Powder Mill Lane			24 June 1974	TQ5677646871; 51°11′58″N 0°14′33″E		1070410	Upload Photo	Q26324267
Barn, Oast Kiln and Attached Farmbuilding About 40 Metres North West of Selbys	II	Oast Kiln And Attached Farmbuilding About 40 Metres North West Of Selbys, Powder Mill Lane			19 February 1990	TQ5681347535; 51°12′20″N 0°14′36″E		1070413	Upload Photo	Q26324273
Grove Cottage	II	Powder Mill Lane			19 February 1990	TQ5725647451; 51°12′17″N 0°14′59″E		1248428	Upload Photo	Q26540643
Selbys Farmhouse	II	Powder Mill Lane			20 October 1954	TQ5677947512; 51°12′19″N 0°14′34″E		1248431	Upload Photo	Q26540646
The Plough Inn	II	Powder Mill Lane			24 June 1974	TQ5676146897; 51°11′59″N 0°14′32″E		1070409	Upload Photo	Q26324265
Glen House, Princess Christian's Hospital	II	Princess Christian's Hospital, Riding Lane			19 February 1990	TQ5734550513; 51°13′56″N 0°15′08″E		1248445	Upload Photo	Q26540658
Barn About 25 Metres North West of Great Forge Farmhouse	II	Riding Lane			29 January 1990	TQ5660349482; 51°13′23″N 0°14′28″E		1248440	Upload Photo	Q26540654
Farm Cottage	II	Riding Lane			19 February 1990	TQ5682049914; 51°13′37″N 0°14′40″E		1363177	Upload Photo	Q26645016
Great Forge Farmhouse	II	Riding Lane			29 January 1990	TQ5663849473; 51°13′23″N 0°14′30″E		1070414	Upload Photo	Q26324275
Hollanden Park Farmhouse	II	Riding Lane			9 July 1973	TQ5677749410; 51°13′20″N 0°14′37″E		1248507	Upload Photo	Q26540716
Stable Block About 35 Metres North West of Great Forge Farmhouse	II	Riding Lane			29 January 1990	TQ5660049510; 51°13′24″N 0°14′28″E		1363157	Upload Photo	Q26644997
Walls, Steps and Statue to the Sunken Garden South East of Nizels House	II	Steps And Statue To The Sunken Garden South East Of Nizels House, Nizels Lane			19 February 1990	TQ5443650245; 51°13′50″N 0°12′38″E		1363152	Upload Photo	Q26644993
Oasthouse West of Old Barn Farmhouse	II	Stocks Green Road			19 February 1990	TQ5586248066; 51°12′38″N 0°13′48″E		1363178	Upload Photo	Q26645017
Old Barn Farmhouse	II	Stocks Green Road			19 February 1990	TQ5588848055; 51°12′38″N 0°13′49″E		1248525	Upload Photo	Q26540734
Railway Bridge at Stocks Green	II	Stocks Green Road			19 February 1990	TQ5637848206; 51°12′42″N 0°14′15″E		1070379	Upload Photo	Q26324206
Stable About 25 Metres West of Old Barn Farmhouse	II	Stocks Green Road			19 February 1990	TQ5584948047; 51°12′37″N 0°13′47″E		1070378	Upload Photo	Q26324204
Drinking Fountain Opposite No 7, Mount Pleasant	II	Tonbridge, TN11 9JQ			19 February 1990	TQ5677848774; 51°13′00″N 0°14′36″E		1070434	Upload Photo	Q26324314
Hildenborough War Memorial	II	Junction Of Noble Tree Road And London Road (b245), Tonbridge, TN11 9HS	war memorial		6 December 2016	TQ5632848867; 51°13′03″N 0°14′13″E		1439848	Hildenborough War Memorial More images	Q66478161
180, Tonbridge Road	II	180, Tonbridge Road, TN11 9HR			19 February 1990	TQ5656448786; 51°13′01″N 0°14′25″E		1363167	Upload Photo	Q26645006
182, Tonbridge Road	II	182, Tonbridge Road, TN11 9HR			19 February 1990	TQ5655948788; 51°13′01″N 0°14′25″E		1248034	Upload Photo	Q26540280
Angier Chest Tomb About 16 Metres North East of the Chancel of the Parish Church of St John	II	Tonbridge Road, TN11 9HR			19 February 1990	TQ5650848855; 51°13′03″N 0°14′23″E		1070428	Upload Photo	Q26324301
Cosling Memorial About 26 Metres North of the West Wall of the Chancel of the Parish Church of St John	II	Tonbridge Road, TN11 9HR			19 February 1990	TQ5648148882; 51°13′04″N 0°14′21″E		1363166	Upload Photo	Q26645005
Dumnelow Memorial About 15 Metres East of the Tower of the Parish Church of St John	II	Tonbridge Road, TN11 9HR			19 February 1990	TQ5650148831; 51°13′02″N 0°14′22″E		1263825	Upload Photo	Q26554586
Herring Memorial About 12 Metres North East of the Vestry of the Parish Church of St John	II	Tonbridge Road, West Malling, TN11 9HR			19 February 1990	TQ5650948859; 51°13′03″N 0°14′23″E		1248026	Upload Photo	Q26540274
Memorial Cross About 11 Metres South East of the Tower of the Parish Church of St John	II	Tonbridge Road, TN11 9HR			19 February 1990	TQ5649748825; 51°13′02″N 0°14′22″E		1070427	Upload Photo	Q26324299
Oakhill House	II	130, Tonbridge Road, Tonbridge, TN11 9EN			20 October 1954	TQ5711748627; 51°12′55″N 0°14′54″E		1277842	Upload Photo	Q26567225
Parish Church of St John	II	Tonbridge Road, TN11 9HR	church building		19 February 1990	TQ5648348848; 51°13′03″N 0°14′21″E		1248015	Parish Church of St John More images	Q26540263
Woodside Cottage	II	99, Tonbridge Road			2 December 1976	TQ5681848606; 51°12′54″N 0°14′38″E		1070433	Upload Photo	Q26324312
Carthorse Stable at Rumshed Farm	II	Underriver			19 February 1990	TQ5511851780; 51°14′39″N 0°13′15″E		1070381	Upload Photo	Q26324210
The Vines	II	Vines Lane			8 March 2006	TQ5630450110; 51°13′44″N 0°14′14″E		1391520	Upload Photo	Q26670879

== See also ==
- Grade I listed buildings in Kent
- Grade II* listed buildings in Kent

== Sources ==
- Newman, John (2012) [1969], Kent: West and the Weald, The Buildings of England, New Haven and London: Yale University Press, ISBN 978-0-300-18509-6
