= William Allison White =

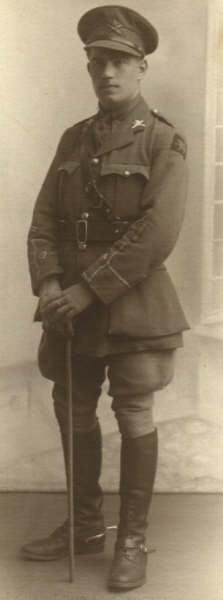
- Born: 19 October 1894; Mitcham, Surrey
- Died: 13 September 1974 (aged 79); Wellington, Shropshire
- Military career
- Allegiance: United Kingdom
- Branch: British Army
- Rank: Captain
- Units: King's Own Royal Regiment; Machine Gun Corps; Royal Artillery
- Conflicts: First World War; Second World War
- Awards: Victoria Cross; Territorial Decoration

William Allison White VC TD (19 October 1894 – 13 September 1974) was an English recipient of the Victoria Cross, the highest and most prestigious award for gallantry in the face of the enemy that can be awarded to British and Commonwealth forces.

He was 23 years old, and a temporary second lieutenant in the 38th Battalion, Machine Gun Corps (part of the 38th (Welsh) Division), British Army during the First World War when the following deed took place for which he was awarded the VC.

On 18 September 1918 at Gouzeaucourt, France, when the advance was held up by enemy machine-guns, Second Lieutenant White rushed a gun position single-handed, shot the three gunners and captured the gun. Later he attacked a gun position accompanied by two men, both of whom were immediately shot down. He went on alone to the gun, killing the team and capturing the gun. On a third occasion when the advance was again held up this officer collected a small party and rushed the position, inflicting heavy losses on the garrison. Subsequently, he consolidated the position by the skilful use of captured enemy and his own machine-guns. The full citation was published in a supplement to the London Gazette of 12 November 1918 (dated 15 November 1918):

War Office, 15th November, 1918.

His Majesty the KING has been graciously pleased to approve of the award of the Victoria Cross to the undermentioned Officers, Noncommissioned Officers and Men: —

[...]

T. /2nd Lt. William Allison White, M.G. Corps.

For most conspicuous bravery and initiative in attack.

When the advance of the infantry was being delayed by an enemy machine gun, he rushed the gun position single-handed, shot the three gunners, and captured the gun. Later, in similar circumstances, he attacked a gun accompanied by two men, but both of the latter were immediately shot down. He went on alone to the gun position and bayoneted or shot the team of five men and captured the gun. On a third occasion, when the advance was held up by hostile fire from an enemy position, he collected a small party and rushed the position, inflicting heavy losses on the garrison.

Subsequently, in consolidating the position by the skilful use of captured enemy and his own machine guns, he inflicted severe casualties on the enemy. His example of fearless and unhesitating devotion to duty under circumstances of great personal danger greatly inspired the neighbouring troops, and his action had a marked effect on the operations.

In 1939, White was commissioned as a captain in the Royal Artillery, Territorial Army.

White married Violet Victoria Price, who died in 1956 after 35 years marriage. He died in 1974, aged 79 at Wellington, Shropshire, and was cremated at Emstrey Crematorium, Shrewsbury. He is mentioned on his wife's headstone in St John's Churchyard, Hildenborough, Kent.

== Bibliography ==
- Gliddon, Gerald (2014) [2002]. Road to Victory 1918. VCs of the First World War. The History Press. ISBN 978-0750953610.
