= Old Powder Mills =

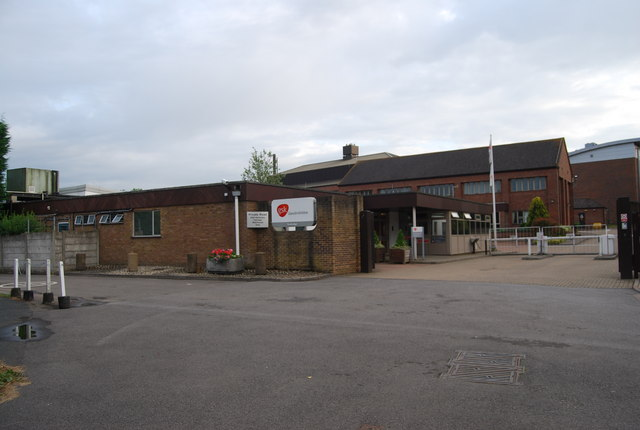
- Entrance in July 2009

- Location within Kent

General information
- Type: Pharmaceutical Research Centre
- Location: Kent, TN11 9AN
- Coordinates: 51.197°N 0.2439°E
- Elevation: 45 m (148 ft)
- Completed: 1949
- Owner: Smith Kline & French, GSK

The Old Powder Mills was a former research centre of GSK in Leigh, Kent.

== History ==
The Mills were established on a loop of the River Medway in 1811 to make gunpowder.

In 1949 the site became a pharmaceutical manufacturing factory, when Menley & James bought the site, who were owned by Smith, Kline & French. In 1952 the site became wholly owned by Smith, Kline & French (SK&F), running under the name Bridge Chemicals. SK&F was based in Welwyn Garden City, and the site ran under Smith Kline & French Research, or SK&F Research. In 1989, the site became part of SmithKline Beecham.

By around 2000, when GSK was formed, around 300 people worked on the site.

=== Closure ===
GSK left the site in 2010, after announcing the closure of the site in February 2010. It was redeveloped for housing by Bellway Homes.

== Structure ==
It was situated between the main village of Leigh and the A21. There was around 155,000 sq ft of laboratories and office buildings. The north part of the site contained office buildings, and the South part of the site only contained laboratories.
