= Herbert Fenwick =

New Zealand cricketer (1861–1934)

Personal information
- Full name: Herbert Shakespeare Fenwick
- Born: 1861; Copenhagen, Denmark
- Died: 18 July 1934 (aged 72/73); Dunedin, Otago, New Zealand
- Role: Wicket-keeper
- Relatives: Fairfax Fenwick (brother)

Domestic team information
- Years: Team
- 1891/92: Canterbury

Career statistics
Competition	First-class
Matches	1
Runs scored	47
Batting average	47.00
100s/50s	0/0
Top score	30*
Catches/stumpings	2/–
- Source: CricketArchive, 24 February 2015

Herbert Shakespeare Fenwick (1861 – 18 July 1934) was a Danish-born cricketer who played a single first-class match in New Zealand for Canterbury during the 1891–92 season.

Fenwick was born in Copenhagen, Denmark, in 1861. His sole match for Canterbury came against Auckland in late March 1892, at a time when interprovincial matches were relatively rare (the Plunket Shield not yet having been established). Serving as the team's wicket-keeper, Fenwick came in ninth in Canterbury's first innings, and topscored with 30 not out, featuring in a 44-run ninth-wicket partnership with Robert Barry. In the second innings, he was promoted to open the batting with Annesley Harman, scoring another 17 runs. Earlier, he had caught two batsmen off the bowling of Herbert de Maus, including Auckland's captain, John Fowke. Auckland went on to win the match by four wickets.

Fenwick's older brother, Fairfax Frederick Fenwick, was also born in Denmark, and played cricket for Otago. Before settling the family in Christchurch, their father, Charles Fenwick, was the consul of the Kingdom of Hanover in Denmark. The Fenwicks, originally from Kingston upon Hull, had been in Scandinavia since the early 18th century, and Charles Fenwick had Danish and German ancestry through his mother. Unlike his brother, who died in England in 1920, Herbert Fenwick remained in New Zealand, dying in Dunedin in 1934.
