= William Downes (cricketer) =

New Zealand cricketer

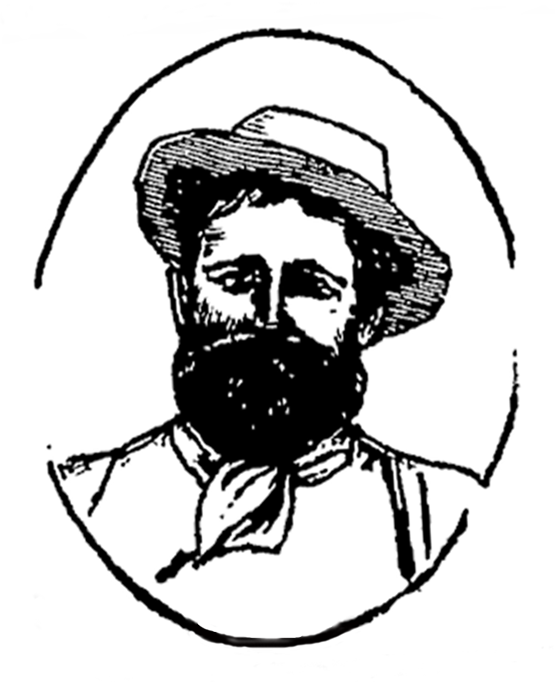
- Newspaper drawing of Downes in 1889

Personal information
- Full name: William Fowles Downes
- Born: 1843; Nantwich, Cheshire, England
- Died: 1 January 1896 (aged 52–53); Wanganui, New Zealand

Domestic team information
- Years: Team
- 1865/66–1875/76: Otago

Career statistics
Competition	First-class
Matches	9
Runs scored	102
Batting average	7.28
100s/50s	0/0
Top score	22
Balls bowled	1,473
Wickets	60
Bowling average	7.00
5 wickets in innings	5
10 wickets in match	2
Best bowling	7/38
Catches/stumpings	8/–
- Source: ESPNcricinfo, 14 April 2019

William Fowles Downes (1843 – 1 January 1896) was a New Zealand cricketer. He played nine first-class matches for Otago between 1865 and 1876.

== Life and career ==
Downes was born in Nantwich, Cheshire, and went to Australia with his family. He later moved on to New Zealand, attracted by the Otago gold rush of the 1860s. Described as a man of "commanding presence, fine physique and genial nature", he began playing for Otago soon after his arrival.

The New Zealand cricket historian Tom Reese described Downes as "the best bowler in New Zealand before 1876 ... a medium-fast bowler with a splendid length and a considerable leg-twist". In 1866–67 he took 6 for 8 and 4 for 14 to dismiss Canterbury for 25 and 32 and give Otago an innings victory. In his last first-class match, in 1875–76, he took 7 for 38 and 3 for 53, but this time Canterbury won.

Downes was the manager of the Bank of New South Wales in Wanganui, where he died after a long illness on 1 January 1896. He had worked for the bank for 30 years, and as manager of the Wanganui branch for six. His longest stay at one branch of the bank was 16 years in Lawrence, Otago, before transferring to New Plymouth in 1884. In its brief notice of his death, The Feilding Star called him "one of the most sterling men in the colony". Twice married, he left a widow, three sons and three daughters.
