= Alice Roosevelt Longworth =

American writer and socialite (1884–1980)

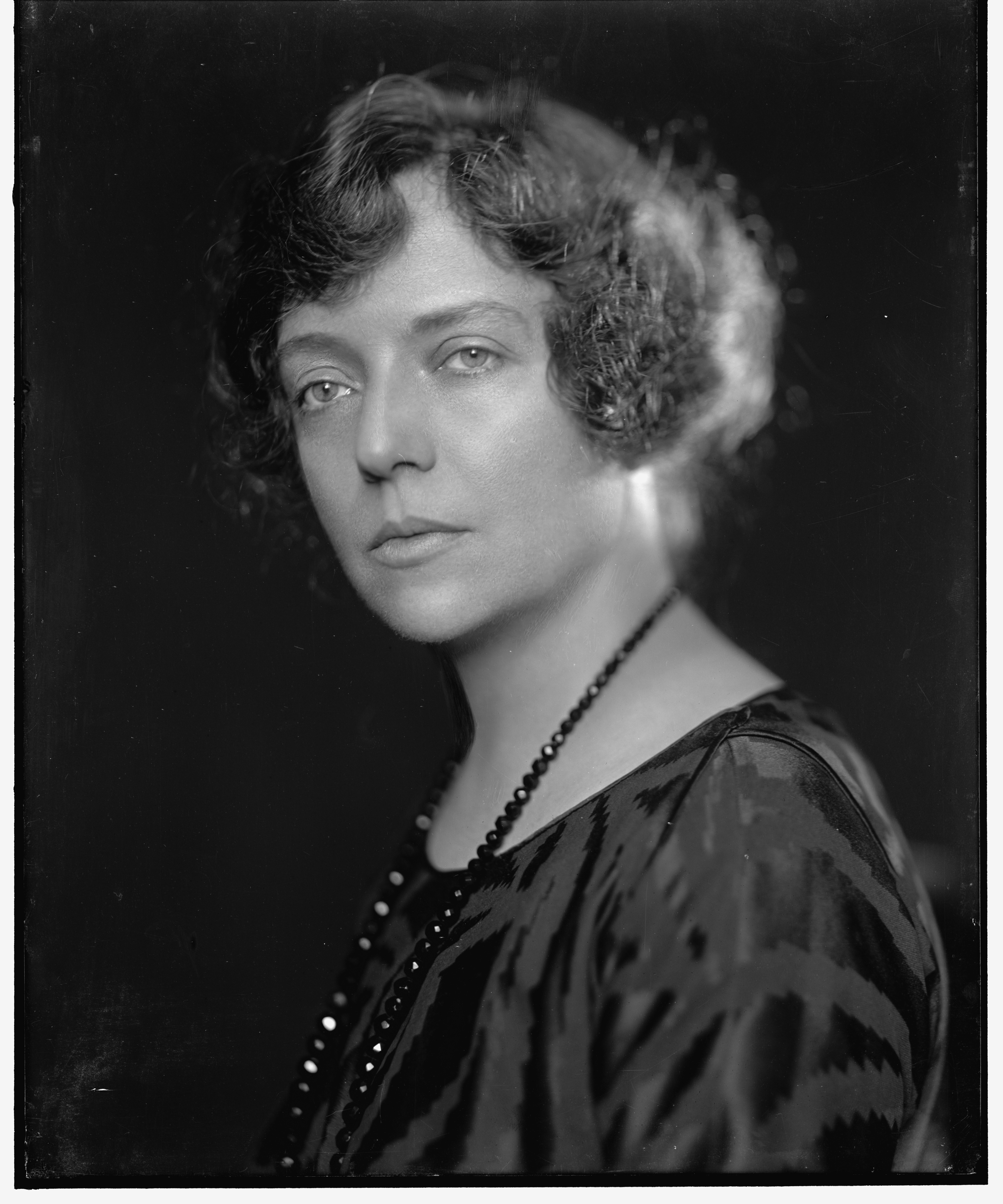
- Roosevelt Longworth in the 1920s
- Born: Alice Lee Roosevelt; February 12, 1884; New York City, U.S.
- Died: February 20, 1980 (aged 96); Washington, D.C., U.S.
- Burial place: Rock Creek Cemetery, Washington, D.C.
- Spouse: Nicholas Longworth III (m. 1906; died 1931)
- Children: Paulina Longworth Sturm (with William Borah)
- Parents: Theodore Roosevelt; Alice Hathaway Lee Roosevelt
- Family: Roosevelt family

Alice Lee Roosevelt Longworth (February 12, 1884 – February 20, 1980) was an American writer, political activist, and socialite. She was the eldest child of United States president Theodore Roosevelt and his only child with his first wife, Alice. She played a prominent role in his presidency from 1901 to 1909 and was a prominent critic of her third cousin, Franklin Delano Roosevelt, during his presidency from 1933 to 1945. As a leading Washington, D.C. socialite for most of her life, she met with sixteen sitting presidents of the United States (Note: Grover Cleveland, Benjamin Harrison, William McKinley, her father Theodore Roosevelt, William Howard Taft, Woodrow Wilson, Warren G. Harding, Calvin Coolidge, Herbert Hoover, her cousin Franklin D. Roosevelt, Harry S. Truman, Dwight D. Eisenhower, John F. Kennedy, Lyndon B. Johnson, Richard Nixon, and Gerald Ford. Some sources erroneously count seventeen, either because they list Grover Cleveland twice for his two nonconsecutive presidencies from 1885 to 1889 and 1893 to 1897 or because she met Ronald Reagan early in his political career, prior to his presidency.) and is widely thought to be the person who met the most sitting presidents in history.

Longworth led an unconventional and controversial life during and after her time in the White House. Her marriage to House speaker Nicholas Longworth was tense, and her only child, Paulina, was born from an affair with Idaho senator William Borah. Remaining active in Washington society until shortly before her death at the age of 96, she was the last surviving child of Theodore Roosevelt and the longest-lived child of any United States president.

== Early life ==
Alice Lee Roosevelt was born on February 12, 1884 in the Roosevelt family home at 6 West 57th St. in Manhattan. Her father Theodore Roosevelt, through whom she was descended from Schuyler family, was a member of the New York State Assembly. Her mother, Alice Hathaway Roosevelt (née Lee) was an heiress of the family which had founded the Boston investment banking firm Lee, Higginson & Co.

On February 14, two days after her birth, her father's mother, Martha, died of typhoid fever. Alice's own mother died of undiagnosed Bright's disease eleven hours later. Their deaths rendered her father distraught; he rarely mentioned Alice for the rest of his life and would not allow her to be mentioned in his presence. Although the newborn Alice was named for her mother, the family therefore called her "Baby Lee." She continued this practice as an adult, often preferring to be called "Mrs. L" rather than "Alice".

Seeking solace, Theodore left Alice in the care of his elder sister Anna, known as Bamie, retreated from his life in New York, and headed west, where he spent two years traveling and living on his ranch in North Dakota. Despite his grief and distance, letters from Theodore to Bamie reveal his concern for his daughter. In one 1884 letter, he wrote, "I hope Mousiekins will be very cunning. I shall dearly love her." Bamie took her under her watchful care, moving Alice into her book-filled Manhattan home until Theodore remarried, and she had a significant influence on young Alice, who would later remark, "If auntie Bye had been a man, she would have been president."

=== Relationship with stepmother and rebellion ===
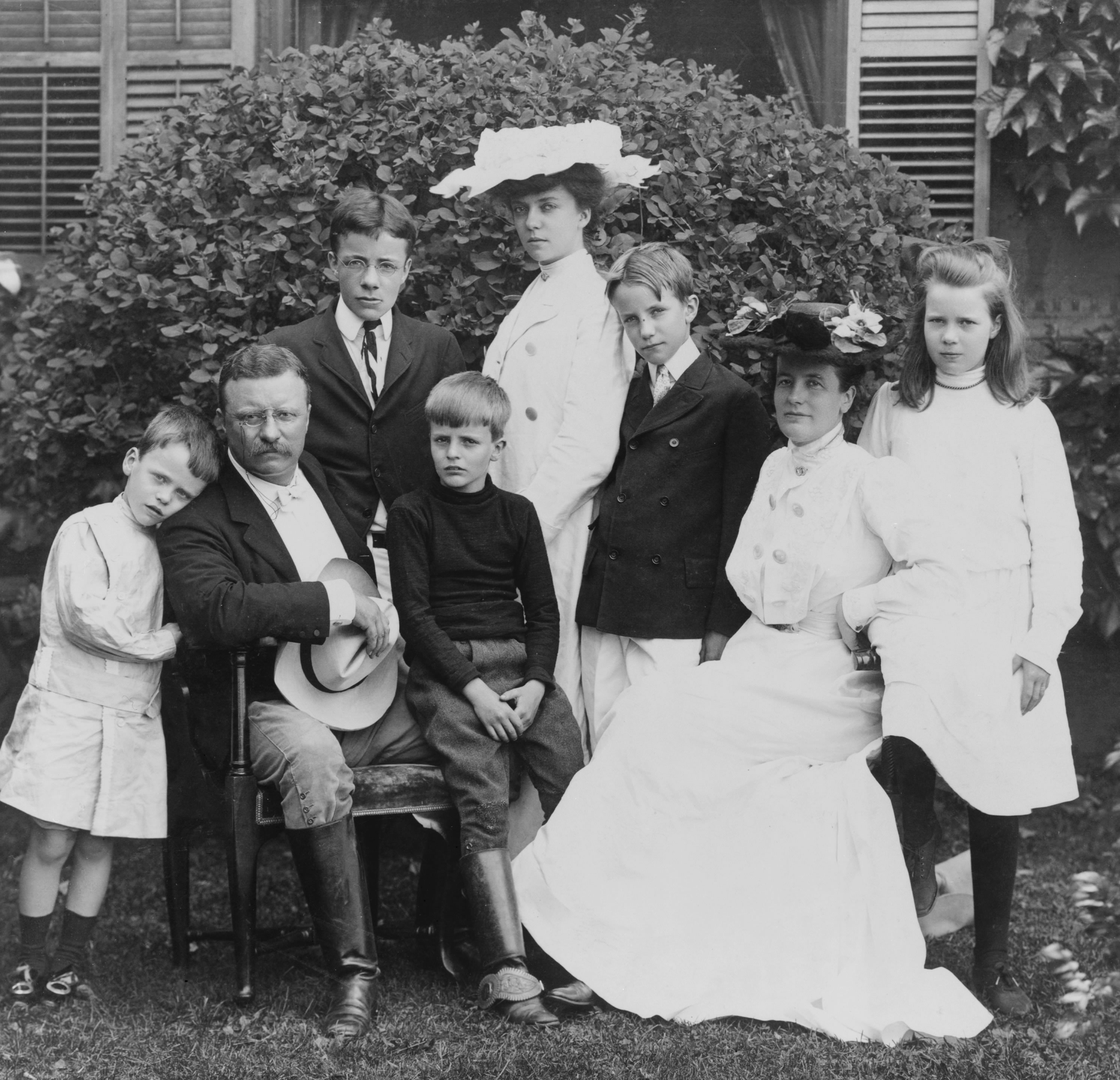
The Roosevelt family in 1903 with Quentin on the left, Theodore Roosevelt, Ted, Archie, Alice, Kermit, Edith, and Ethel.

On December 2, 1886, Theodore married his childhood friend Edith Kermit Carow, and two-year old Alice returned to her father's home, where she was raised by her father and stepmother, along with five half-siblings born to Edith: Ted (b. 1887), Kermit (b. 1889), Ethel (b. 1891), Archie (b. 1894), and Quentin (b. 1897). After Alice was returned to her father, her aunt Bamie married and moved to London for a time, becoming a more remote figure in her life.

Young Alice struggled to get along with her stepmother, who had known her mother before her death. Edith made it clear that she regarded the late Alice as a beautiful fool, insipid and childlike and once angrily told Alice that if her mother had lived, she would have bored Theodore to death. During this period of her childhood, continuing tension with her stepmother and her father's physical and emotional distance led Alice to become impulsive, desperate for attention, and confrontational.

In 1898, her father was elected governor of New York. During his term in office, he and Edith proposed that Alice attend the Spence School, a conservative girls' school in New York City. In response, Alice wrote him, "If you send me, I will humiliate you. I will do something that will shame you. I tell you I will." During this time, Bamie, who had returned to New York City, provided Alice with needed structure and stability. Later in life, Alice said of her aunt, "There is always someone in every family who keeps it together. In ours, it was Auntie Bye."

In later years, Alice expressed admiration for her stepmother's sense of humor and literary taste. In her memoirs, Alice wrote of Edith, "That I was the child of another marriage was a simple fact and made a situation that had to be coped with, and Mother coped with it with a fairness and charm and intelligence, which she has to a greater degree than almost any one else I know."

== Life in the White House (1901–09) ==
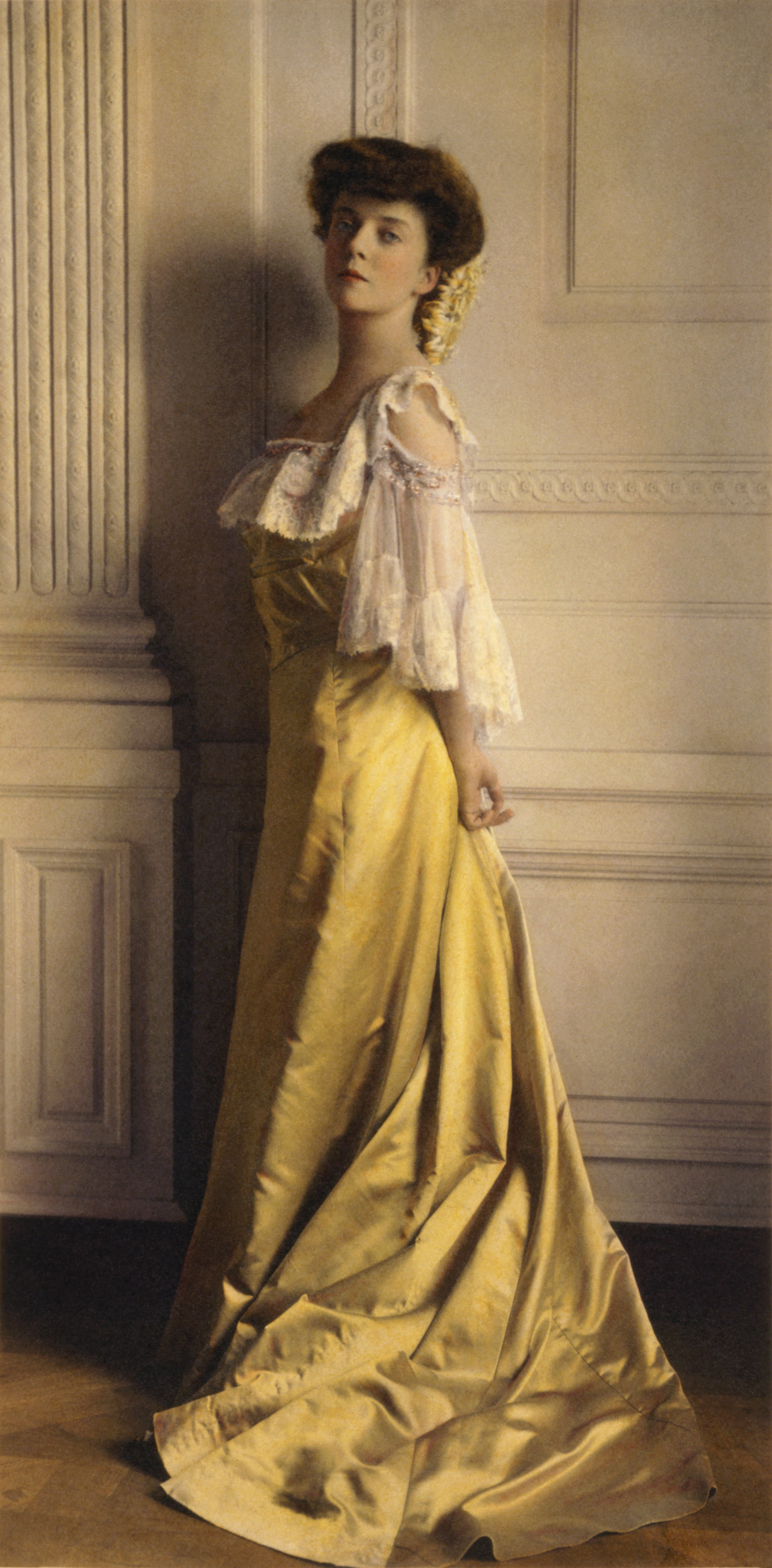
Hand-tinted photograph of Alice Roosevelt circa 1903 by Frances Benjamin Johnston.

In the 1900 elections, Alice's father was elected vice president of the United States, and following the September 1901 assassination of William McKinley, he became president, an event that Alice greeted with "sheer rapture".

Alice was the center of society attention during her father's presidency, and she thrived on it. In this, she emulated her father, of whom she later remarked, "He wants to be the bride at every wedding, the corpse at every funeral, and the baby at every christening." The American people and press took to her instantly, earning her the nickname "Princess Alice." At the age of 17, Alice became an instant celebrity and fashion icon. Her society debut was in 1902, and the gown she wore became famous, with its color popularly known as "Alice blue," sparking a trend in women's clothing and inspiring a popular 1919 song, "Alice Blue Gown".

As the first daughter, Alice was known for breaking many social norms for young women of her era. She smoked cigarettes in public and on the White House roof, rode in cars with men, stayed out late partying, kept a pet snake, and was seen placing bets with a bookie. Public scrutiny also came with unwanted speculation; one newspaper falsely claimed that she had stripped down to lingerie at a drunken orgy held at a Newport, Rhode Island mansion and danced atop a table. Alice also played practical jokes. On May 11, 1908, The New York Times reported that she had amused herself in the House of Representatives gallery by placing a tack on the chair of an unknown gentleman.

Over time, her father began to rely on her as a personal and state representative, including on her 1905 state tour of Asia. However, her rebelliousness continued to exasperate her father. Once, after interrupting a conversation between the president and Owen Wister for a third time, he threatened to throw her "out the window," and remarked to Wister, "I can either run the country or I can attend to Alice, but I cannot possibly do both." When it came time for the Roosevelt family to move out of the White House in 1909, Alice buried a voodoo doll of the new first lady, Nellie Taft, in the front yard. After Taft took office and Nellie had a paralyzing stroke, the doll was discovered, and Alice was barred from the White House grounds.

=== Tour of Asia ===
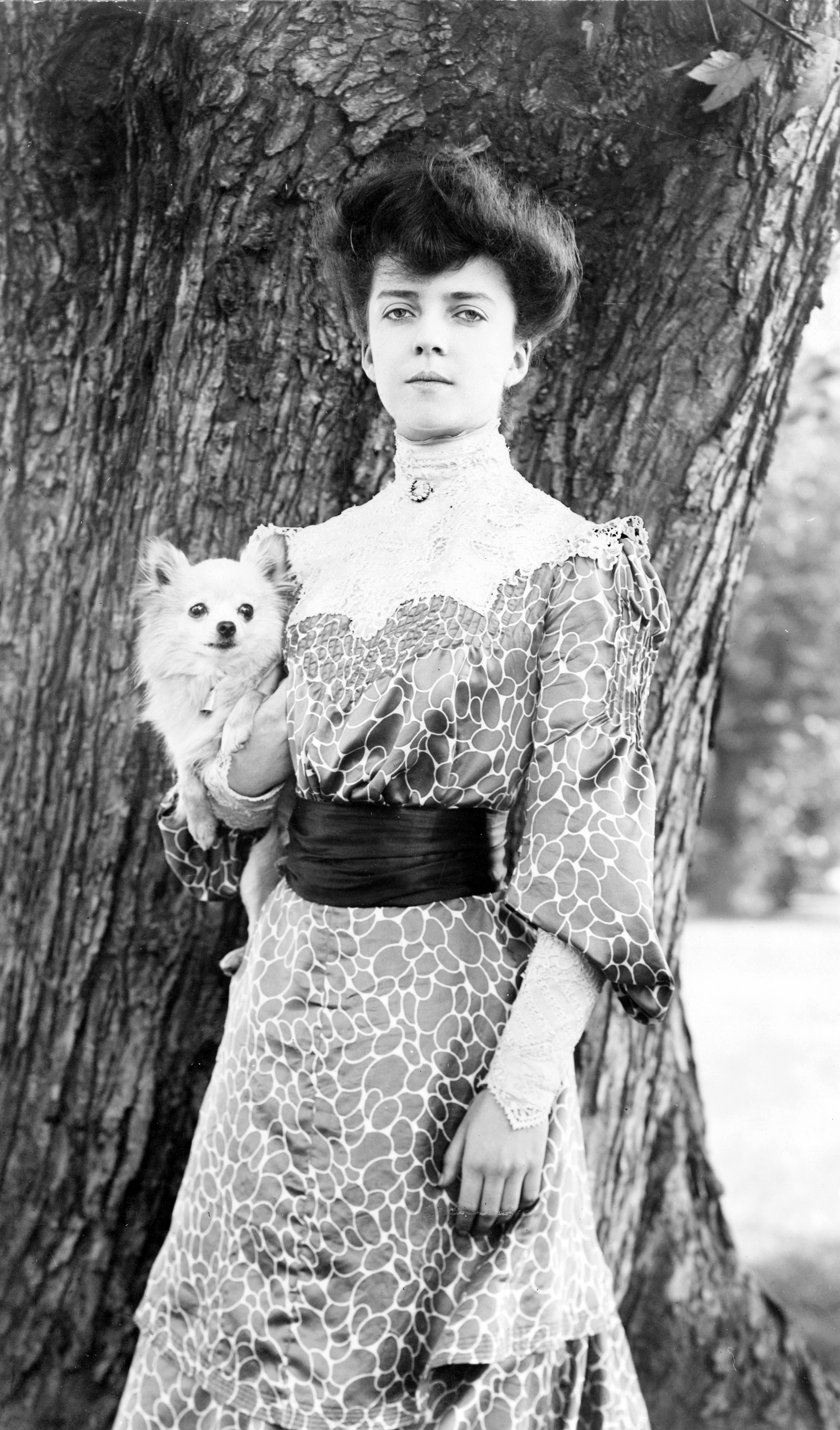
Alice Roosevelt in 1902 with her dog, Leo, a long-haired Chihuahua. She was also gifted a Pekingese named Manchu by the Empress Dowager Cixi in 1905.

In 1905, Alice and Secretary of War William Howard Taft led an American delegation on visits to Japan, Hawaii, China, the Philippines, and Korea. It was the largest diplomatic mission to Asia in American history at that point, including 23 representatives (including her fiancé, Ohio representative Nicholas Longworth), seven senators, diplomats, officials, and businessmen.

On September 12, Alice made news again when papers reported that she had jumped into the ship's swimming pool fully clothed and coaxed New York representative William Bourke Cockran to join her in the water. Newspapers put a romantic spin on the story and reported it was Longworth, to whom Alice was soon engaged. Years later, Robert F. Kennedy chided her about the incident, saying it was outrageous for the time, to which Alice replied that it would only have been outrageous had she removed her clothes. In her memoirs, Alice noted that there was little difference between the linen skirt and blouse she had been wearing and a lady's swimsuit of the period.

=== Wedding to Nicholas Longworth ===
Upon her return from Asia in December, the Roosevelts announced Alice's engagement to Nicholas Longworth, the scion of a prominent Ohio family who was fourteen years her senior and had a playboy reputation within the capital city. Their wedding was held on February 17, 1906 in the East Room of the White House and was considered the social event of the season, with over one thousand guests and many thousands more gathered outside the White House. She wore a cream white satin wedding dress and dramatically cut the wedding cake with a military sword, borrowed from an aide in attendance. Immediately after the wedding, the couple honeymooned in Cuba and visited the Longworth family in Cincinnati, followed by travels to England and Europe, where they dined with Edward VII, Wilhelm II, Georges Clemenceau, Whitelaw Reid, George Curzon, and William Jennings Bryan.

== Post-White House ==
=== Marriage ===
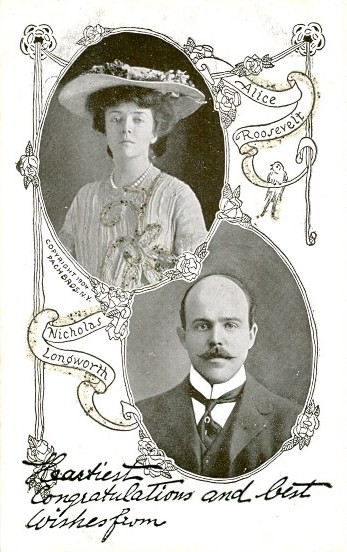
Postcard celebrating the 1906 marriage of Alice Roosevelt and Nicholas Longworth

After she married Longworth in 1905, the couple bought a house at 2009 Massachusetts Avenue NW, the present home of the Washington Legal Foundation.

By 1912, their marriage became tense, as the couple took opposing sides in that year's presidential election; Alice supported her father, while Nicholas supported his mentor, Taft. During the campaign, Alice appeared onstage at a campaign rally for her father's ticket alongside vice presidential candidate Hiram Johnson, in her husband's own Ohio district. Longworth ultimately lost his seat to Democratic challenger Stanley E. Bowdle by 101 votes, with many progressive supporters of the Roosevelts voting for third-party candidate Millard F. Andrew. Longworth joked that Alice had been worth at least one hundred votes. Although Longworth was re-elected to the House in 1914 and served for the remainder of his life, the 1912 campaign contributed to a permanent and public chill in their marriage.

The marriage ended when Longworth died on April 9, 1931.

==== Affairs, daughter, and granddaughter ====
Both spouses were repeatedly unfaithful during the marriage, and it was general knowledge that Alice carried on a long affair with Idaho senator William Borah. In 1925, she gave birth to their only child, Paulina, and privately joked that she should name her "Deborah," as in "of Borah." According to one family friend, Paulina was referred to as "Aurora Borah Alice." When Alice's diaries were opened to historical research, they corroborated the assumption that Borah was her father. Longworth's biographers and historians have generally concluded that he was aware of Paulina's paternity, but he was a doting father nevertheless.

Paulina married Alexander McCormick Sturm, and they had one daughter, Joanna (b. 1946). Alexander died in 1951, and Paulina died in 1957 from an overdose of sleeping pills. Alice successfully fought for custody of Joanna, and they had a very close relationship. In 1969, American Heritage magazine called Joanna "a notable contributor to Mrs. Longworth's youthfulness."

=== Political involvement and commentary ===
After leaving the White House, Alice remained an active figure in Washington, D.C. society and a frequent political activist and wit.

She took on increasing responsibilities as her father's advisor and representative, particularly after illness incapacitated her aunt Bamie. Although she warned her father against challenging William Howard Taft for the Republican nomination in 1912, she supported her father's unsuccessful bid to reclaim the presidency as an independent progressive in the general election. In 1916, during the presidency of Woodrow Wilson, she was barred from the White House a second time for a bawdy joke at Wilson's expense. She and her father campaigned heavily against the entry of the United States into the League of Nations under the terms of the Treaty of Versailles, and she carried on the successful cause after he died in 1919.

==== Conflict with Hyde Park Roosevelts ====
After her father's return to the Republican Party and death, Alice became a partisan Republican for many years. In 1924, she supported her half-brother Ted for governor of New York; he narrowly lost to Al Smith. The 1924 campaign pitted the Oyster Bay branch of the family against the Hyde Park branch, led by Franklin and Eleanor, his wife and Alice's first cousin. When Franklin D. Roosevelt ran for president in 1932, Alice publicly opposed his candidacy in the Ladies' Home Journal, writing in October, "Politically, his branch of the family and ours have always been in different camps, and the same surname is about all we have in common. I am going to vote for Hoover. ... If I were not a Republican, I would still vote for Mr. Hoover this time." During the 1940 presidential campaign, she publicly proclaimed that she'd "rather vote for Hitler than vote for Franklin for a third term". However, when columnist and Roosevelt cousin Joseph Alsop claimed there was grassroots support for Wendell Willkie as the party's 1940 nominee, she retorted, "the grassroots of 10,000 country clubs."

One of her most famous supposed witticisms was directed at the party's nominee in 1944 and 1948, Thomas E. Dewey, whom she allegedly referred to as "the little man on the wedding cake." The image of Dewey as a pencil-mustached figurine stuck, and he lost two consecutive presidential elections. However, the quote was an intentional misattribution. In 1968, writer Isabel Kinnear Griffin confessed to Roosevelt that Griffin and journalist Helen Essary had attended an embassy party and asked the attendees if it was true that Alice Longworth had made the remark, which resulted in Washington society spreading the word that Alice had indeed said it.

==== Kennedy and Nixon era (1960–1974) and beyond ====
In the 1950s, she developed a genuine friendship with vice president Richard Nixon, who served as pallbearer at her daughter's funeral. After Nixon lost the 1960 presidential election and returned home to California, she encouraged him to remain in politics, and he was a regular guest at her society dinners. Nixon called her "the most interesting [conversationalist of the age]" and said, "No one, no matter how famous, could ever outshine her."

After the election, she became close with Nixon's victorious opponent, John F. Kennedy, and his family. In particular, she developed an affectionate friendship with Bobby Kennedy, the president's brother. Though she remained a lifelong Republican, she admitted to voting for Lyndon B. Johnson over Barry Goldwater in 1964 and was known to support Bobby in the 1968 Democratic Party primaries. After Bobby, like his brother, was assassinated, she again supported Nixon in the 1968 and 1972 elections, and Nixon invited her to his first White House dinner and his daughter Tricia's 1971 wedding. During the 1972 campaign, she was recorded in a telephone conversation with Nixon sharply criticizing the Democratic nominee George McGovern.

She remained cordial with Nixon's successor, Gerald Ford, but she declined to meet Jimmy Carter, the last sitting president in her lifetime, over a perceived lack of social grace on his part. In the official statement marking her death, Carter wrote "She had style, she had grace, and she had a sense of humor that kept generations of political newcomers to Washington wondering which was worse—to be skewered by her wit or to be ignored by her."

=== Wit ===
Alice's biting wit extended beyond political commentary, though it was generally reserved for Washington politicians. One of her most famous comments was embroidered on a throw pillow in her Washington home: "If you can't say something good about someone, sit right here by me."

When Joseph McCarthy jokingly remarked at a party, "Here's my blind date. I am going to call you Alice," she sarcastically responded, "Senator McCarthy, you are not going to call me Alice. The truckman, the trashman and the policeman on my block may call me Alice, but you may not." She once informed Lyndon B. Johnson that she wore wide-brimmed hats so that he couldn't kiss her. When a well-known Washington senator was discovered to have been having an affair with a young woman less than half his age, she quipped, "You can't make a soufflé rise twice." In a 60 Minutes interview with Eric Sevareid televised in 1974, she claimed to be a hedonist.

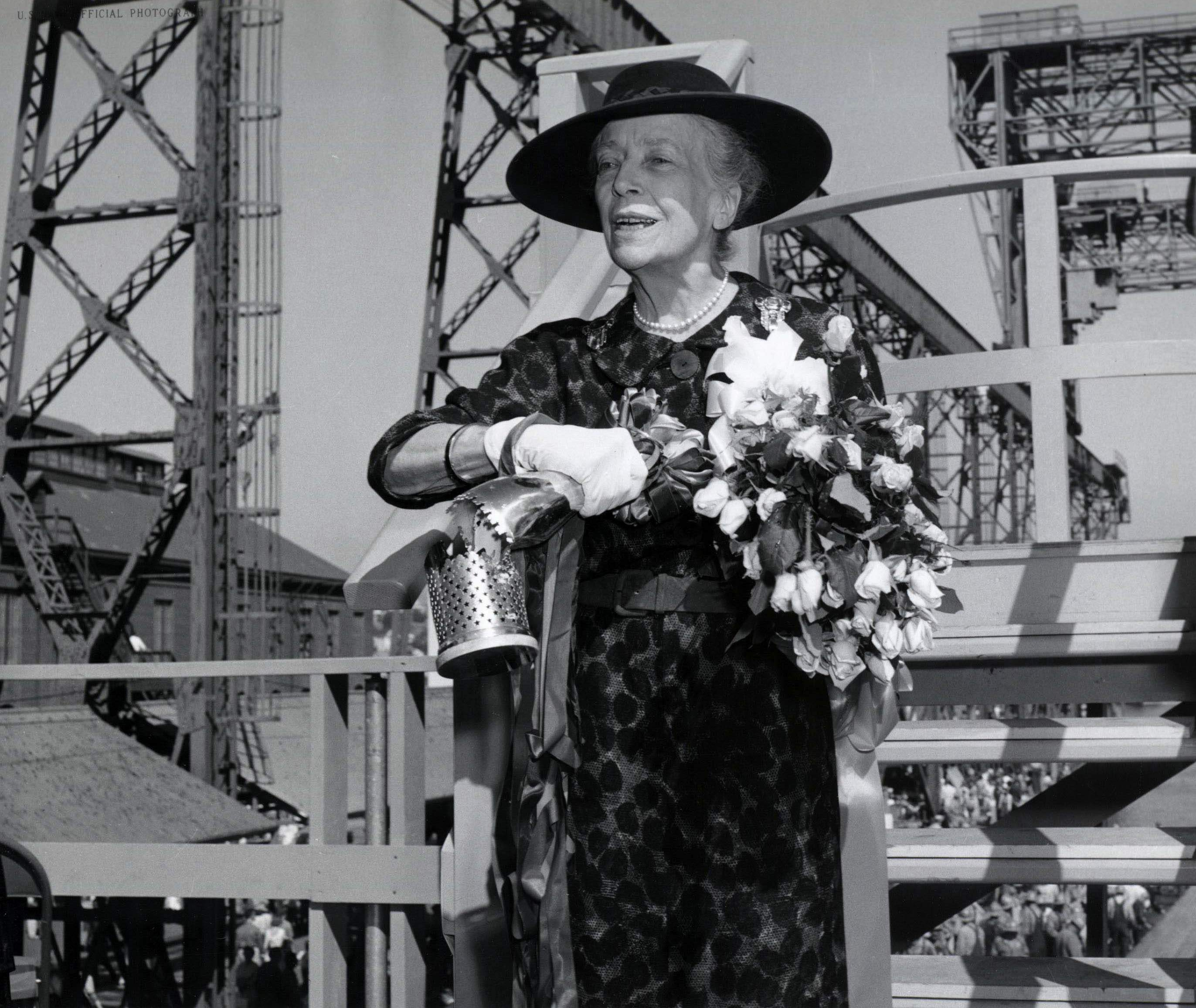
Alice Roosevelt Longworth christening the USS Theodore Roosevelt in 1959.

== Later life and death ==
In 1955, Alice slipped and suffered a hip fracture. In 1956, she was diagnosed with breast cancer and underwent a mastectomy. Cancer was found in her other breast in 1970, requiring a second mastectomy.

After many years of ill health, Alice died of emphysema and pneumonia, with contributory effects of a number of other chronic illnesses, in her Embassy Row house on February 20, 1980, eight days after her 96th birthday. She is buried in Rock Creek Cemetery.

== General and cited references ==
=== Books ===
- Brough, James. Princess Alice: A Biography of Alice Roosevelt Longworth. Boston: Little, Brown. 1975.
- Caroli, Betty Boyd. The Roosevelt Women. New York: Basic Books, 1998.
- Cordery, Stacy A. Alice: Alice Roosevelt Longworth, from White House Princess to Washington Power Broker. New York: Viking, 2007.
- Felsenthal, Carol. Princess Alice: The Life and Times of Alice Roosevelt Longworth. New York: St. Martin's Press. 1988.
- Longworth, Alice Roosevelt. Crowded Hours (Autobiography). New York: Scribners. 1933.
- Miller, Nathan. Theodore Roosevelt: A Life. William Morrow, 1992,
- Morris, Edmund (2001). The Rise of Theodore Roosevelt. New York: Random House Trade Paperback Edition. ISBN 0-375-75678-7.
- Nixon, Richard (1990). In the Arena: A Memoir of Victory, Defeat and Renewal. New York: Simon & Schuster. pp. 163–164. ISBN 0-671-72934-9.
- Peyser, Mark; Dwyer, Timothy (2015). Hissing Cousins: The Untold Story of Eleanor Roosevelt and Alice Roosevelt Longworth. Doubleday. ISBN 9780385536028.
- Teichmann, Howard. Alice: The Life and Times of Alice Roosevelt Longworth. Englewood Cliffs, NJ. 1979.
- Wead, Doug. All the Presidents' Children: Triumph and Tragedy in the Lives of America's First Families. New York: Atria Books, 2004.

=== Articles ===
- Marquis James (pseud. Quid), "Princess Alice" (subscription required), The New Yorker 1/2 (February 28, 1925): 9–10. (Profile.)
