= John Fowke (cricketer) =

New Zealand cricketer

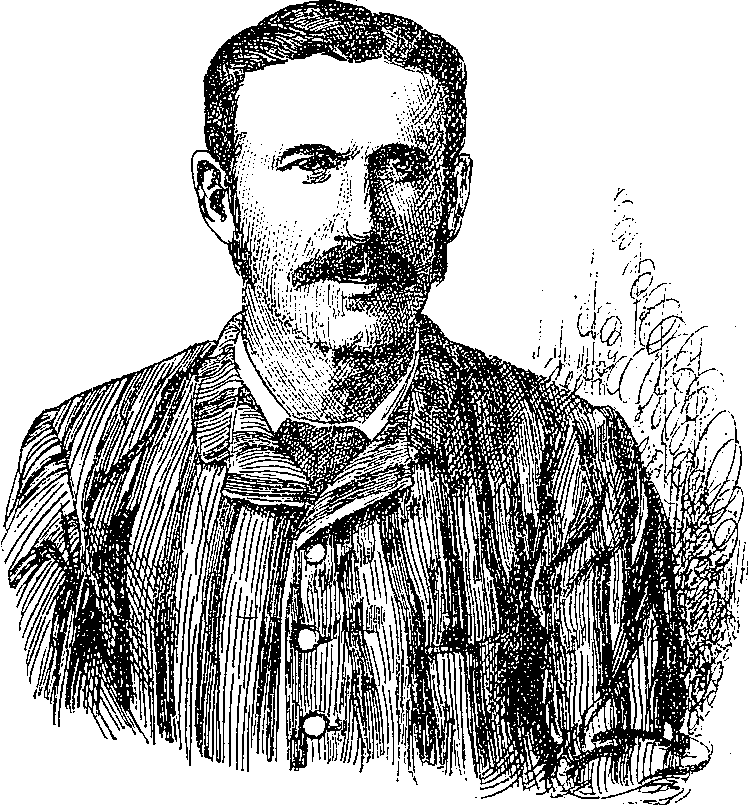

Personal information
- Full name: John Nicholls Fowke
- Born: 23 October 1858; Tenby, Wales
- Died: 25 April 1938 (aged 79); Christchurch, New Zealand
- Batting: Right-handed
- Role: Wicket-keeper

Domestic team information
- Years: Team
- 1880/81–1888/89: Canterbury
- 1889/90–1893/94: Auckland
- 1894/95–1906/07: Canterbury

Career statistics
Competition	First-class
Matches	40
Runs scored	561
Batting average	10.20
100s/50s	0/0
Top score	36
Catches/stumpings	45/28
- Source: Cricinfo, 9 March 2018

John Nicholls Fowke (23 October 1859 – 25 April 1938) was a New Zealand cricketer, born in Wales. He played first-class cricket for Auckland and Canterbury between 1881 and 1907.

A wicket-keeper, in 1893-94 Fowke played for New Zealand against New South Wales in New Zealand's first international first-class match. He was notable among wicket-keepers for always standing up to the stumps. He was also a useful lower-order batsman, noted for his strong defence in adversity. He was 47 years old when he played his last first-class match, in which Canterbury defeated the touring Marylebone Cricket Club on New Year's Day 1907. He played club cricket in Christchurch into his fifties.

Fowke continued to work for cricket in Canterbury after his playing days were over. In 1910–11, when Canterbury were struggling to find funds to send their team to Auckland to contest the Plunket Shield, he began a public appeal, which raised the required money. Canterbury won the match, taking the Shield from Auckland for the first time since 1907.

A bootmaker by trade, Fowke also worked as a tally clerk at the Lyttelton wharf. He married Emma Elizabeth Wagstaff in Christchurch in December 1883.

In January and February 1920, Fowke contributed an 11-part series of cricketing reminiscences to the Christchurch Star, under the title "Reminiscences of the Sporting World: 'Johnny' Fowke Talks of Cricket".
