= Leigh, Kent =

Village in Kent, England

Coordinates: 51.196°N 0.220°E

Leigh
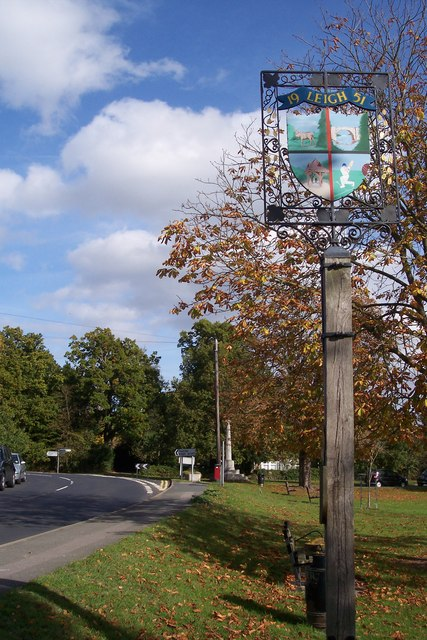

- Location within Kent
- Area: 16.18 km^{2} (6.25 sq mi)
- Population: 1,793 (2011)
  - Density: 111/km^{2} (290/sq mi)
- OS grid reference: TQ555465
- District: Sevenoaks
- Shire county: Kent
- Region: South East
- Country: England
- Sovereign state: United Kingdom
- Post town: Tonbridge
- Postcode district: TN11
- Dialling code: 01732
- Police: Kent
- Fire: Kent
- Ambulance: South East Coast
- UK Parliament: Tonbridge

Leigh (/ˈlaɪ/), historically spelled Lyghe, is a village and a civil parish located in the Sevenoaks district of Kent, England. It is located six miles (10 km) south of Sevenoaks town and three miles (5 km) west of Tonbridge.

There is a large village green; nearby is the private Hall Place estate (built 1870–72), which is not open to the public. The parish church (13th century) is dedicated to St Mary.

== History ==
The name of the village derives from the Old English leah, meaning a forest glade or clearing.

Leigh is thought to have grown from a hamlet, evidence of which dates back to the late 11th century. Much of the land around the village was acquired in the 14th century by Sir John de Pulteney, owner of nearby Penshurst Place. In 1533, the estate passed to the Sidney family who retained ownership of most of this land until the early 20th century.

The village grew substantially in the 19th century when the Baily and Morley families built many of the distinctive buildings present today, including Hall Place, East and Old Lodges, The Square, Forge Square and School Master's House. The Tonbridge to Redhill railway was built in 1842 to the south of the village, bringing further growth in population.

== Government ==
Leigh is administered by Sevenoaks District Council and Kent County Council. It falls within the UK parliamentary constituency of Tonbridge.

The parish of Leigh also includes the hamlet of Charcott as well as the Old Powder Mills and Moorden.

== Community facilities ==
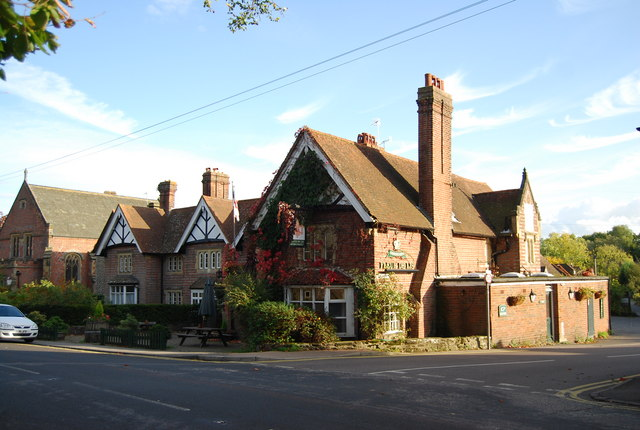
The Fleur De Lis pub

The Fleur De Lis is the only public house in the village itself, although the Plough Inn is located to the east of the village on Powder Mill Lane. The Fleur De Lis was originally built as cottages by Thomas Baily in 1855, but was bought by a local brewery, Bartrum and Company, in 1870.

== Transport ==
Leigh railway station is on the Redhill to Tonbridge line and is located to the south of the village centre. It opened as "Leigh Halt" in 1911 but has been named "Leigh" since 1969.

The former Penshurst Airfield was located within the parish, to the south of Charcott. It operated mainly as a military airfield in 1916–1936 and 1940–1946. The remaining buildings were removed in 1991.

== Local places of interest ==
- St Mary's Church, Leigh

== Notable people ==
- Henry Thomas Buckle (1821 1862), author of History of civilization in England.
- Amy Catherine Walton (1849–1939), writer of Christian literature for children, moved to Leigh with her priest husband, Octavius Frank Walton, in 1906. He retired in 1918, but they soon moved back.

== See also ==
- October 1926 Air Union Blériot 155 crash, which was within Leigh parish
- Listed buildings in Leigh, Kent
