= Thomas Sweet =

New Zealand cricketer (1851–1905)

Personal information
- Full name: Thomas Shardalow Sweet
- Born: 1 August 1851; Hackney, England
- Died: 17 March 1905 (aged 53); Melbourne, Australia
- Bowling: Fast

Domestic team information
- Years: Team
- 1873/74: Auckland
- 1874/75–1876/77: Canterbury

Career statistics
Competition	FC
Matches	6
Runs scored	85
Batting average	8.50
100s/50s	0/0
Top score	20
Balls bowled	1,241
Wickets	48
Bowling average	6.75
5 wickets in innings	5
10 wickets in match	2
Best bowling	7/34
Catches/stumpings	6/–
- Source: ESPNcricinfo, 3 April 2026

Thomas Shardalow Sweet (1 August 1851 – 17 March 1905) was a New Zealand cricketer. He played first-class cricket for Auckland and Canterbury between 1873 and 1877. He later moved to Australia, where he was known as Alfred Shardalow Simpson.
