= Alf Fenwick =

English footballer

Personal information
- Full name: Alfred Randolph Fenwick
- Date of birth: 26 March 1891
- Place of birth: Medomsley, near Hamsterley, Consett, England
- Date of death: 1975 (aged 83–84)
- Height: 5 ft 10 in (1.78 m)
- Position: Wing half

Senior career*
Years	Team	Apps	(Gls)
1909–1911	Craghead United		
1911–1914	Hull City	17	(7)
1919	West Ham United	2	(0)
1919–1921	Coventry City	50	(1)
1921–1922	Craghead United		
1922–1924	Blyth Spartans		
1924	Ashington	12	(0)
1924–1925	Blyth Spartans		
1925–1926	Halifax Town	0	(0)
1927	Bedlington United		
Total		81	(8)
- * Club domestic league appearances and goals

Alfred Randolph Fenwick (26 March 1891 – 1979) was an English footballer who played in the Football League for Ashington, Coventry City, Hull City and West Ham United.
