= George Lee (New Zealand cricketer) =

New Zealand cricketer

Personal information
- Born: 13 April 1851; Chelsea, England
- Died: 22 May 1931 (aged 80); Christchurch, New Zealand
- Source: Cricinfo, 17 October 2020

George Lee (13 April 1851 – 22 May 1931) was a New Zealand cricketer. He played in four first-class matches for Canterbury from 1870 to 1876.
