= 2015–16 Super Smash =

- Dates: 5 November 2015 – 13 December 2015
- Administrator: New Zealand Cricket
- Cricket format: Twenty20
- Tournament format(s): Double round-robin and final
- Champions: Auckland Aces (4th Title)
- Participants: 6

The 2015–16 Georgie Pie Super Smash (named after the competition's sponsor McDonald's New Zealand brand Georgie Pie) was the eleventh season of the Men's Super Smash Twenty20 cricket tournament in New Zealand. The tournament consisted of a double round-robin, with the top three teams qualifying for the play-offs.

The Auckland Aces won the tournament.

== Teams ==
| Team | City | ground | Coach | Captain | Overseas players |
|---|---|---|---|---|---|
| Auckland Aces | Auckland | Eden Park | Mark O'Donnell | Rob Nicol | James Fuller |
| Northern Knights | Hamilton | Seddon Park | James Pamment | Daniel Flynn | Kevin O'Brien; Timm van der Gugten |
| Central Stags | New Plymouth | Yarrow Stadium | Heinrich Malan | George Worker | Mahela Jayawardene; Mitchell Claydon |
| Wellington Firebirds | Wellington | Basin Reserve | Jamie Siddons | Michael Papps | Dane Hutchinson |
| Canterbury Kings | Christchurch | Hagley Oval | Bob Carter | Roneel Hira | Aiden Blizzard; Michael Hussey; Shane Watson |
| Otago Volts | Dunedin | University Oval | Dimitri Mascarenhas | Nathan McCullum | Christi Viljoen |

== Table ==
| Pos | Team | Pld | Pts |
|---|---|---|---|
| 1 | Otago Volts | 10 | 26 |
| 2 | Auckland Aces | 10 | 24 |
| 3 | Canterbury Kings | 10 | 22 |
| 4 | Central Districts Stags | 10 | 18 |
| 5 | Northern Knights | 10 | 18 |
| 6 | Wellington Firebirds | 10 | 12 |

Win = 4 points / No Result = 2 points / Q = Qualified

== Fixtures ==
5 November 2015
Scorecard

| Central Stags; 139/8 (20 overs) | v | Otago Volts; 140/5 (17.1 overs) |
| Tom Bruce 82* (51); Warren Barnes 3/33 (4 overs) | | Anaru Kitchen 47 (33); Andrew Mathieson 4/18 (4 overs) |

Otago Volts won by 6 wickets
Pukekura Park, New Plymouth
Umpires: Ashley Mehrotra (Nzl) and Tony Gillies (Nzl)

- Central Stags won the toss and elected to bat.
- Tom Bruce, Josh Clarkson (Central Districts) and Warren Barnes (Otago) all made their T20 debuts.
- Andrew Mathieson best bowling figures in T20 career. (3/18)

6 November 2015
7:10 pm
Scorecard

| Northern Knights; 153/10 (19.2 overs) | v | Canterbury Kings; 154/3 (18.3) |
| Anton Devcich 43 (18); Andrew Ellis 5/9 (2.2 overs) | | Henry Nicholls 58* (52); Scott Kuggeleijn 1/19 (2.3 overs) |

Canterbury Kings won by 7 wickets
Seddon Park, Hamilton
Umpires: Billy Bowden (Nzl) and Ashley Mehrotra (Nzl)

- Northern Knights won the toss and elected to bat.
- Leo Carter (Canterbury) made his T20 debut.
- Andrew Ellis best bowling figures in T20 career. (5/9)

7 November 2015
7:10 pm
Scorecard

| Otago Volts; 141/8 (20 overs) | v | Central Stags; 146/6 (18.3 overs) |
| Neil Broom 70* (49); George Worker 5/10 (4 overs) | | George Worker 42 (25); Nathan McCullum 2/19 (4 overs) |

Central Stags won by 4 wickets
Yarrow Stadium, New Plymouth
Umpires: Barry Frost (Nzl) and Phil Jones (Nzl)

- Central Stags won the toss and elected to bowl.
- George Worker best bowling figures in T20 career. (5/10)

8 November 2015
2:20 pm
Scorecard

| Canterbury Kings; 134/5 (15 overs) | v | Wellington Firebirds; 135/3 (14.4 overs) |
| Ronnie Hira 44 (36); Luke Woodcock 2/21 (3 overs) | | Stephen Murdoch 40* (23); Logan Van Beek 1/22 (3 overs) |

Wellington Firebirds won by 7 wickets
Hagley Oval, Christchurch
Umpires: Tim Parlane (Nzl) and Tony Gillies (Nzl)

- Wellington Firebirds won the toss and elected to bowl.
- 70 minute delay with rain

11 November 2015
7:10 pm
Scorecard

| Auckland Aces; 134/5 (20 overs) | v | Central Stags; 135/7 (19 overs) |
| Robert O'Donnell 51 (46); Andrew Mathieson 3/18 (4 overs) | | Josh Clarkson 64* (48); Michael Bates 4/28 (4 overs) |

Central Stags won by 3 wickets
Pukekura Park, New Plymouth
Umpires: Billy Bowden (Nzl) and Wayne Knights (Nzl)

- Central Stags won the toss and elected to bowl.
- Robert O'Donnell (Auckland) made his T20 debut.
- Robert O'Donnell highest T20 score. (51)
- Josh Clarkson highest T20 score. (64*)

12 November 2015
4:10 pm
Scorecard

| Canterbury Kings; 134/10 (20 overs) | v | Otago Volts; 137/1 (15.1 overs) |
| Henry Nicholls 51 (41); Jacob Duffy 5/18 (4 overs) | | Michael Bracewell 80* (49); Ed Nuttall 1/22 (3 overs) |

Otago Volts won by 9 wickets
Hagley Oval, Christchurch
Umpires: Barry Frost (Nzl) and Chris Brown (Nzl)

- Canterbury Kings won the toss and elected to bat.
- Ed Nuttall (Canterbury) made his T20 debut.
- Jacob Duffy best bowling figures in T20 career. (5/18)
- Michael Bracewell highest T20 score. (80*)

12 November 2015
7:10 pm
Scorecard

| Northern Knights; 184/4 (20 overs) | v | Wellington Firebirds; 72/10 (13.1 overs) |
| Anton Devcich 66 (57); Dane Hutchinson 3/44 (4 overs) | | Matt Taylor 28 (21); Ish Sodhi 3/12 (3 overs) |

Northern Knights won by 112 runs
Seddon Park, Hamilton
Umpires: Ashley Mehrotra (Nzl) and Tim Parlane (Nzl)

- Wellington Firebirds won the toss and elected to bowl.
- Alecz Day (Wellington) made his T20 debut.
- Ish Sodhi best bowling figures in T20 career. (3/12)

15 November 2015
1:00 pm

| Wellington Firebirds; 139/6 (20 overs) | v | Otago Volts; 140/3 (19 overs) |
| Alecz Day 38 (49); Bradley Scott 3/25 (4 overs) | | Neil Broom 70 (53); Aruan Verma 1/18 (2 overs) |

Otago Volts won by 7 wickets
University Oval, Dunedin
Umpires: D. Walker (Nzl) and J. Bromley (Nzl)

- Otago Volts won the toss and elected to bowl.

15 November 2015
2:10 pm

| Auckland Aces; 217/4 (20 overs) | v | Central Stags; 207/7 (20 overs) |
| Colin Munro 89 (40); Josh Clarkson 2/21 (3 overs) | | Will Young 96 (50); Matt Quinn 3/46 (4 overs) |

Auckland Aces won by 10 runs
Eden Park, Auckland
Umpires: Billy Bowden (Nzl) and C.Brown (Nzl)

- Central Stags won the toss and elected to bowl.

15 November 2015
2:00 pm

| Northern Knights; 172/8 (20 overs) | v | Canterbury Kings; 160/6 (20 overs) |
| Corey Anderson 42 (18); Ewan Nuttall 3/30 (4 overs) | | Adien Blizzard 69 (53); Jono Boult 2/29 (4 overs) |

Northern Knights won by 12 runs
Cobham Oval, Whangārei
Umpires: A. Gillies (Nzl) and P. Jones (Nzl)

- Canterbury Kings won the toss and elected to bowl.
- Ewan Nuttall best bowling figures in T20 career. (3/30)

17 November 2015
4:00 pm

| Northern Knights; 77/10 (19.2 overs) | v | Otago Volts; 78/2 (11.3 overs) |
| Anton Devcich 33 (32); Joel Finnie 4/11 (4 overs) | | Brad Wilson 31* (17); Ish Sodhi 1/16 (4 overs) |

Otago Volts won by 8 wickets
University Oval, Dunedin
Umpires: D. Walker (Nzl) and W. Knights (Nzl)

- Otago Volts won the toss and elected to bowl.

18 November 2015
4:00 pm

| Auckland Aces; 170/4 (20 overs) | v | Canterbury Kings; 170/9 (20 overs) |
| Rob Nicol 50* (48); Hamish Bennett 2/30 (4 overs) | | Aiden Blizzard 57 (38); Mitchell McClenaghan 3/42 (4 overs) |

Auckland Aces won in an elimination over.
Eden Park, Auckland
Umpires: A. Gillies (Nzl) and Barry Frost (Nzl)

- Auckland Aces won the toss and elected to bowl.

18 November 2015
4:00 pm

| Canterbury Kings; 5/2 (6 balls) | v | Auckland Aces; 6/0 (1 ball) |
| Peter Fulton 3* (2); Michael Bates 2/5 (6 balls) | | Colin Munro 6* (1); Hamish Bennett 0/6 (1 ball) |

Auckland Aces won the elimination over.
Eden Park, Auckland

19 November 2015
4:00 pm

| Wellington Firebirds; 175/9 (20 overs) | v | Central Stags; 149/9 (20 overs) |
| Stephen Murdoch 70 (45); Seth Rance 3/32 (4 overs) | | Kruger Van Wyk 38 (35); Jade Dernbach 3/25 (4 overs) |

Wellington Firebirds won by 26 runs.
Saxton Oval, Nelson
Umpires: K. Cross (Nzl) and P. Jones (Nzl)

- Wellington Firebirds won the toss and elected to bat.
- Stephen Murdoch highest T20 score. (70)

20 November 2015
7:10 pm

| Northern Knights | v | Auckland Aces |

Match Abandoned without a ball bowled.
Seddon Park, Hamilton
Umpires: Billy Bowden (Nzl) and A. Mehrotra (Nzl)

- No toss
- Rain Abandoned game.

21 November 2015
7:10 pm

| Central Stags | v | Canterbury Kings |

Match Abandoned without a ball bowled.
Yarrow Stadium, New Plymouth
Umpires: Tim Parlane (Nzl) and Barry Frost (Nzl)

- No toss
- Rain Abandoned game.

22 November 2015
1:10 pm

| Auckland Aces; 156/9 (20 overs) | v | Otago Volts; 155/6 (20 overs) |
| Colin Munro 45 (17); Nathan McCullum 3/19 (4 overs) | | Anaru Kitchen 45 (22); Matt Quinn 2/31 (4 overs) |

Auckland Aces won by 1 run.
Eden Park, Auckland
Umpires: D. Walker (Nzl) and R. Hooper (Nzl)

- Otago Volts won the toss and elected to bowl.

22 November 2015
2:00 pm

| Wellington Firebirds; 152/5 (20 overs) | v | Northern Knights; 154/3 (18 overs) |
| Stephen Murdoch 92* (59); Jono Boult 1/17 (3 overs) | | Anton Devcich 67 (53); Alecz Day 2/32 (3 overs) |

Northern Knights won by 7 wickets.
Basin Reserve, Wellington
Umpires: P. Jones (Nzl) and S. Haig (Nzl)

- Northern Knights won the toss and elected to bat.
- Stephen Murdoch highest T20 score. (92*)

25 November 2015
4:00 pm

| Otago Volts; 181/8 (20 overs) | v | Wellington Firebirds; 162/10 (20 overs) |
| Brad Wilson 67 (46); Jade Dernbach 4/33 (4 overs) | | Matthew Taylor 65 (41); Sam Wells 4/24 (3 overs) |

Northern Knights won by 7 wickets.
Basin Reserve, Wellington
Umpires: W. Knights (Nzl) and Billy Bowden (Nzl)

- Wellington Firebirds won the toss and elected to bowl.
- Matthew Taylor highest T20 score. (65)
- Sam Wells best career bowling figures. (4/24)

26 November 2015
4:00 pm

| Auckland Aces; 133/9 (20 overs) | v | Canterbury Kings; 134/4 (16.3 overs) |
| Brad Cachopa 49 (41); Andrew Ellis 4/17 (4 overs) | | Peter Fulton 76* (43); Mitchell McClenaghan 3/23 (4 overs) |

Canterbury Kings won by 6 wickets.
Hagley Oval, Christchurch
Umpires: D. Walker (Nzl) and C. Brown (Nzl)

- Auckland Aces won the toss and elected to bat.
- Cameron Fletcher highest T20 score. (38)

26 November 2015
7:10 pm

| Central Stags; 170/6 (20 overs) | v | Northern Knights; 173/8 (19.2 overs) |
| Mahela Jayawardene 76 (52); Scott Kuggeleijn 3/24 (4 overs) | | Anton Devcich 70 (47); Mitch Claydon 3/28 (4 overs) |

Northern Knights won by 2 wickets.
Seddon Park, Hamilton
Umpires: B. Frost (Nzl) and A. Gillies (Nzl)

- Northern Knights won the toss and elected to bowl.
- Scott Kuggeleijn best career bowling figures. (3/24)

29 November 2015
1:00 pm

| Canterbury Kings; 152/8 (20 overs) | v | Otago Volts; 129/9 (20 overs) |
| Cameron Fletcher 61 (56); Warren Barnes 3/30 (4 overs) | | Neil Broom 39 (35); Ronnie Hira 4/18 (4 overs) |

Canterbury Kings won by 23 runs
University Oval, Dunedin
Umpires: Barry Frost (Nzl) and A. Gillies (Nzl)

- Otago Volts won the toss and elected to bowl.
- Cameron Fletcher highest T20 score. (61)

29 November 2015
1:10 pm

| Wellington Firebirds; 136/9 (20 overs) | v | Auckland Aces; 140/3 (18.3 overs) |
| Michael Pollard 33 (30); Tarun Nethula 2/18 (4 overs) | | Colin de Grandhomme 38* (26); Jeetan Patel 3/26 (4 overs) |

Auckland Aces won by 7 wickets
Basin Reserve, Wellington
Umpires: P. Jones (Nzl) and A. Mehrotra (Nzl)

- Wellington Firebirds won the toss and elected to bat.

2 December 2015
4:00 pm

| Canterbury Kings; 145/10 (20 overs) | v | Wellington Firebirds; 127/9 (20 overs) |
| Ronnie Hira 57 (40); Aruna Verma 3/34 (4 overs) | | Tom Blundell 60 (48); Ronnie Hira 2/20 (4 overs) |

Canterbury Kings won by 18 runs
Basin Reserve, Wellington
Umpires: Billy Bowden (Nzl) and A. Gilles (Nzl)

- Wellington Firebirds won the toss and elected to bowl.
- Tom Blundell highest T20 career score. (60)

3 December 2015
4:00 pm

| Otago Volts | v | Auckland Aces |

Match Abandoned
University Oval, Dunedin
Umpires: Barry Frost (Nzl) and Tim Parlane (Nzl)

- No Toss

4 December 2015
7:10 pm

| Central Stags; 165/9 (20 overs) | v | Wellington Firebirds; 132/10 (19 overs) |
| Tom Bruce 54 (31); Aruan Verma 4/27 (4 overs) | | Michael Pollard 44 (34); Adam Milne 2/18 (4 overs) |

Central Stags won by 33 runs
McLean Park, Napier
Umpires: C. Brown (Nzl) and W. Knights (Nzl)

- Central Stags won the toss and elected to bat.
- Aruan Verma career best bowling figures. (4/27)
- Play delayed for 20 minutes due to too much light.

5 December 2015
7:10 pm

| Auckland Aces; 191/4 (20 overs) | v | Northern Knights; 154/10 (18.3 overs) |
| Colin Munro 82 (39); Timm van der Gugten 2/47 (4 overs) | | Corey Anderson 39 (22); Rob Nicol 3/37 (4 overs) |

Auckland Aces won by 37 runs
Seddon Park, Hamilton
Umpires: Billy Bowden (Nzl) and Barry Frost (Nzl)

- Auckland Aces won the toss and elected to bat.

6 December 2015
3:00 pm

| Otago Volts; 178/4 (20 overs) | v | Northern Knights; 122/10 (16.2 overs) |
| Michael Bracewell 54 (39); Ish Sodhi 1/15 (4 overs) | | Nick Kelly 42 (32); Anaru Kitchen 3/31 (4 overs) |

Otago Volts won by 56 runs
Bay Oval, Mt Maunganui
Umpires: Billy Bowden (Nzl) and W. Knights (Nzl)

- Northern Knights won the toss and elected to bowl.

6 December 2015
3:00 pm

| Canterbury Kings; 166/6 (20 overs) | v | Central Stags; 149/9 (20 overs) |
| Peter Fulton 48 (33); Seth Rance 3/17 (4 overs) | | Mahela Jayawardene 53 (44); Logan van Beek 3/21 (3 overs) |

Canterbury Kings won by 17 runs
Hagley Oval, Christchurch
Umpires: A. Gilles (Nzl) and C. Brown (Nzl)

- Canterbury Kings won the toss and elected to bat.

6 December 2015
3:10 pm

| Auckland Aces; 109/10 (18.2 overs) | v | Wellington Firebirds; 110/3 (15.1 overs) |
| Colin Munro 28 (22); Dane Hutchinson 3/17 (3.2 overs) | | Tom Blundell 45* (41); Tarun Nethula 1/14 (3 overs) |

Wellington Firebirds won by 7 wickets
Eden Park, Auckland
Umpires: A. Mehrotra (Nzl) and T. Parlane (Nzl)

- Auckland Aces won the toss and elected to bat.

11 December 2015
7:10 pm

| Otago Volts; 165/5 (20 overs) | v | Auckland Aces |
| Hamish Rutherford 91* (66); Rob Nicol 2/20 (4 overs) |

Match Abandoned by rain.
Yarrow Stadium, New Plymouth
Umpires: Billy Bowden and Phil Jones

- Auckland Aces won the toss and elected to bowl.
- Otago go through to the Final because of finishing top of the table
- Hamish Rutherford highest career T20 score. (91*)

12 December 2015
7:10 pm

| Canterbury Kings; 113/10 (19.2 overs) | v | Auckland Aces; 50/2 (9.3 overs) |
| Cameron Fletcher 33 (36); Donovan Grobbelar 3/23 (3.3 overs) | | Rob Nicol 27* (32); Todd Astle 2/9 (2 overs) |

Auckland Aces won by 2 runs (D/L)
Yarrow Stadium, New Plymouth
Umpires: Billy Bowden and W. Knights

- Auckland Aces won the toss and elected to field.
- When rain stopped play Auckland needed 48 to win with Duckworth - Lewis.

13 December 2015
7:10 pm

| Auckland Aces; 166/6 (20 overs) | v | Otago Volts; 146/9 (20 overs) |
| Rob Nicol 77 (54); Warren Barnes 3/33 (4 overs) | | Nathan McCullum 35 (21); Mitchell McClenaghan 3/23 (4 overs) |

Auckland Aces won by 20 runs
Yarrow Stadium, New Plymouth
Umpires: Billy Bowden and Phil Jones

- Auckland Aces won the toss and elected to bat.
- Auckland Aces win the Georgie Pie Super Smash 2015.

== See also ==
- Plunket Shield
- Ford Trophy
- HRV Cup
