= 2009–10 HRV Cup =

- Administrator: New Zealand Cricket
- Cricket format: Twenty20
- Tournament format: Double round-robin
- Champions: Central Districts Stags (2nd title)
- Runners-up: Auckland Aces
- Participants: 6
- Matches: 31
- Player of the series: Scott Styris
- Most runs: Ross Taylor
- Most wickets: Graham Napier

The 2009–10 HRV Cup (named after the competition's sponsor HRV) was the fifth season of the Men's Super Smash Twenty20 cricket tournament in New Zealand. This season is the first to be sponsored by Heat recovery ventilation vendor, HRV, and was held between 2 January and 31 January 2010.

== Rules and regulations ==
Points
Results	Points
Win	4 points
No result	2 points
Loss	0 points

If a match ends with the scores tied, the tie is broken with a one-over-per-side Super Over.

== Standings ==
Pos	Team	Pld	W	L	T	NR	Pts	NRR
1	Central Districts Stags (C)	10	7	3	0	0	28	0.309
2	Auckland Aces	10	6	4	0	0	24	0.496
3	Otago Volts	10	5	3	0	2	24	0.270
4	Northern Districts Knights	10	5	5	0	0	20	0.538
5	Wellington Firebirds	10	3	5	0	2	16	−0.876
6	Canterbury Wizards	10	2	8	0	0	8	−0.853

Source: Full table on cricinfo
(C) Champions

Winner qualified for the 2010 Champions League Twenty20.

== Teams ==
Club	Home ground	Captain
Auckland Aces	Eden Park	Gareth Hopkins
Canterbury Wizards	AMI Stadium	Kruger van Wyk
Central Districts Stags	Pukekura Park	Jamie How
Northern Districts Knights	Seddon Park	James Marshall
Otago Volts	University Oval	Craig Cumming
Wellington Firebirds	Basin Reserve	Matthew Bell

== League progression ==
	Group matches										Knockout
Team	1	2	3	4	5	6	7	8	9	10	F
Central Districts Stags	4	8	12	12	16	20	20	20	24	28	W
Auckland Aces	0	0	4	8	12	12	16	20	24	24	L
Otago Volts	4	4	8	10	14	18	20	20	20	24	
Northern Districts Knights	4	4	4	8	8	12	16	16	20	20	
Wellington Firebirds	0	4	4	6	6	6	8	12	12	16	
Canterbury Wizards	4	4	4	4	4	4	4	8	8	8	
Note: The total points at the end of each group match are listed. Note: Click on the points (group matches) or W/L (knockout) to see the summary for the match.				Win			Loss			No result	
Note: The total points at the end of each group match are listed. Note: Click on the points (group matches) or W/L (knockout) to see the summary for the match.				Team was eliminated before the league reached this stage.							

== Results ==
	Auckland Aces	Canterbury Wizards	Central Districts Stags	Northern Districts Knights	Otago Volts	Wellington Firebirds
Auckland Aces		Canterbury; 1 wicket	Auckland; 7 wickets	Auckland; 18 runs	Otago; Super Over	Auckland; 68 runs
Canterbury Wizards	Auckland; 6 wickets		Central Districts; 6 wickets	Northern Districts; 1 wicket	Otago; 43 runs	Wellington; 7 runs
Central Districts Stags	Auckland; 1 run	Central Districts; 8 wickets		Central Districts; 19 runs	Central Districts; 1 run	Central Districts; 19 runs
Northern Districts Knights	Northern Districts; 5 runs	Northern Districts; 71 runs	Central Districts; 4 wickets (D/L)		Otago; 6 wickets	Northern Districts; 6 wickets
Otago Volts	Otago; 5 wickets	Canterbury; 6 wickets	Central District; 4 wickets	Otago; 10 runs		Abandoned; No result
Wellington Firebirds	Auckland; 2 runs	Wellington; 7 wickets	Wellington; 19 runs (D/L)	Northern District; 60 runs	Abandoned; No result	

Note: Results listed are according to the home and visitor teams.
Note: Click on the results to see match summary.

Home team won	Visitor team won	Match abandoned

== Group stage ==
2 January
16:30
Scorecard

(H) Northern Districts Knights; 164/7 (20 overs)	v	Auckland Aces; 159/7 (20 overs)
BJ Watling 73 (59); Daryl Tuffey 2/22 (4 overs)		Gareth Hopkins 50 (33); Bruce Martin 2/22 (4 overs)

Northern Districts Knights won by 5 runs
Blake Park, Mount Manganui
Umpires: Evan Gray, Phil Jones

- Auckland won the toss and chose to field.

3 January
12:00
Scorecard

(H) Central Districts Stags; 208/5 (20 overs)	v	Wellington Firebirds; 189/9 (20 overs)
Peter Ingram 70 (59); Luke Woodcock 3/36 (4 overs)		Neal Parlane 69 (39); Graham Napier 3/22 (4 overs)

Central Districts Stags won by 19 runs
Puekura Park, New Plymouth
Umpires: Barry Frost, Evan Watkin

- Wellington won the toss and chose to field.

3 January
16:30
Scorecard

(H) Northern Districts Knights; 137/7 (20 overs)	v	Otago Volts; 140/4 (18.5 overs)
Anton Devcich 37 (34); Neil Beard 2/27 (4 overs)		Brendon McCullum 47 (36); Tim Southee 3/15 (4 overs)

Otago Volts won by 6 wickets
Blake Park, Mount Manganui
Umpires: Phil Jones, Dave Paterson

- Northern Districts won the toss and chose to bat.

4 January
12:00
Scorecard

(H) Auckland Aces; 144/6 (20 overs)	v	Canterbury Wizards; 145/9 (19.5 overs)
Ravi Bopara 55* (44); Rob Nicol 2/19 (4 overs)		Rob Nicol 52 (35); Michael Bates 2/37 (4 overs)

Canterbury Wizards won by 1 wicket
Colin Maiden Park, Auckland
Umpires: Chris Gaffaney, Tim Parlane

- Canterbury won the toss and chose to field.

6 January
17:00
Scorecard

(H) Central Districts Stags; 116 (18 overs)	v	Otago Volts; 115/9 (20 overs)
Ross Taylor 40 (19); Yasir Arafat 3/16 (4 overs)		Ian Butler 28* (31); Jacob Oram 5/14 (4 overs)

Central Districts Stags won by 1 run
Puekura Park, New Plymouth
Umpires: Barry Frost, Wayne Knights

- Central Districts won the toss and chose to bat.

6 January
17:00
Scorecard

Canterbury Wizards; 163/9 (20 overs)	v	Wellington Firebirds (H); 166/3 (17.4 overs)
Shanan Stewart 57 (33); Andrew McKay 4/38 (4 overs)		Owais Shah 65* (29); Carl Frauenstein 1/13 (2 overs)

Wellington Firebirds won by 7 wickets
Basin Reserve, Wellington
Umpires: Gary Baxter, Chris Gaffaney

- Wellington won the toss and chose to field.

8 January
17:00
Scorecard

Otago Volts; 159/7 (20 overs)	v	Canterbury Wizards (H); 116 (18 overs)
Neil Broom 58 (37); Ryan Burson 4/16 (4 overs)		Dean Brownlie 33 (26); Neil Wagner 3/21 (3 overs)

Otago Volts won by 43 runs
Queen Elizabeth II Park, Christchurch
Umpires: Gary Baxter, Tim Parlane

- Otago won the toss and chose to bat.

8 January
17:00
Scorecard

(H) Central Districts Stags; 184 (20 overs)	v	Northern Districts Knights; 165/8 (20 overs)
Ross Taylor 53 (32); Tim Southee 3/40 (4 overs)		James Marshall 53 (36); George Worker 2/9 (1 over)

Central Districts Stags won by 19 runs
Pukekura Park, New Plymouth
Umpires: Barry Frost, Wayne Knights

- Northern Districts won the toss and chose to field.

8 January
17:00
Scorecard

Auckland Aces; 169/5 (20 overs)	v	Wellington Firebirds (H); 167/9 (20 overs)
Anaru Kitchen 61* (41); Jeetan Patel 2/30 (4 overs)		James Franklin 72 (48); Daryl Tuffey 3/19 (4 overs)

Auckland Aces won by 2 runs
Basin Reserve, Wellington
Umpires: Evan Gray, Derek Walker

- Wellington won the toss and chose to field.

10 January
14:00
Scorecard

Central Districts Stags; 155/9 (20 overs)	v	Auckland Aces (H); 156/3 (18.2 overs)
Mathew Sinclair 69 (54); Colin de Grandhomme 3/22 (3 overs)		Gareth Hopkins 71* (44); Michael Mason 2/21 (4 overs)

Auckland Aces won by 7 wickets
Colin Maiden Park, Auckland
Umpires: Phil Agent, Phil Jones

- Auckland won the toss and chose to field.

10 January
14:00
Scorecard

(H) Canterbury Wizards; 127/9 (20 overs)	v	Northern Districts Knights; 130/9 (20 overs)
Michael Papps 28 (27); Joseph Yovich 3/26 (4 overs)		Tim Southee 32 (16); Rob Nicol 5/22 (4 overs)

Northern Districts Knights won by 1 wicket
Village Green, Christchurch
Umpires: Peter Gasston, Evan Watkin

- Northern Districts won the toss and chose to field.

10 January
14:00
Scorecard

(H) Otago Volts {{{score1}}}	v	Wellington Firebirds {{{score2}}}

No result
University Oval, Dunedin
Umpires: Chris Gaffaney, Mike George

- Wellington won the toss and chose to field.

12 January
17:00
Scorecard

(H) Otago Volts; 160/3 (20 overs)	v	Northern Districts Knights; 150/8 (20 overs)
Craig Cumming 56* (32); Daniel Vettori 1/19 (4 overs)		Tim Southee 35* (14); Nathan McCullum 2/19 (4 overs)

Otago Volts won by 10 runs
Queen's Park, Invercargill
Umpires: Tim Parlane, Evan Watkin

- Otago won the toss and chose to bat.

13 January
17:00
Scorecard

(H) Auckland Aces; 229/3 (20 overs)	v	Wellington Firebirds; 161/8 (20 overs)
Lou Vincent 105* (60); Andy McKay 2/44 (4 overs)		Neal Parlane 85 (50); Daryl Tuffey 2/26 (4 overs)

Auckland Aces won by 68 runs
Colin Maiden Park, Auckland
Umpires: Phil Jones, Derek Walker

- Wellington won the toss and chose to field.

13 January
17:00
Scorecard

(H) Canterbury Wizards; 162/5 (20 overs)	v	Central Districts Stags; 166/4 (18.4 overs)
Peter Fulton 43 (27); Graham Napier 2/34 (4 overs)		Mathew Sinclair 54* (41); 2/26 (4 overs)

Central Districts Stags won by 6 wickets
Aorangi Oval, Timaru
Umpires: Phil Agent, Evan Gray

- Central Districts won the toss and chose to field.

15 January
17:00
Scorecard

Canterbury Wizards; 135/8 (20 overs)	v	Central Districts Stags (H); 141/2 (19.1 overs)
Peter Fulton 41* (35); Seth Rance 4/13 (4 overs)		Peter Ingram 77* (69); Johann Myburgh 1/25 (3.1 overs)

Central Districts Stags won by 8 wickets
Saxton Oval, Nelson
Umpires: Derek Walker, Evan Watkin

- Central Districts won the toss and chose to field.

15 January
17:00
Scorecard

Auckland Aces; 168/8 (20 overs)	v	Otago Volts (H); 171/5 (19.3 overs)
Scott Styris 54 (44); Ian Butler 6/28 (4 overs)		Brendon McCullum 108* (67); Scott Styris 3/23 (4 overs)

Otago Volts won by 5 wickets
University Oval, Dunedin
Umpires: Jeremy Busby, Phil Jones

- Auckland won the toss and chose to bat.

15 January
17:00
Scorecard

Wellington Firebirds; 119/9 (20 overs)	v	Northern Districts Knights (H); 120/4 (16.3 overs)
Owais Shah 29 (26); Tim Southee 2/17 (4 overs)		Peter McGlashan 43 (38); James Franklin 1/18 (2 overs)

Northern Districts Knights won by 6 wickets
Blake Park, Mount Manganui
Umpires: Chris Gaffaney, Evan Gray

- Wellington won the toss and chose to bat.

17 January
13:00
Scorecard

Auckland Aces; 162/7 (20 overs)	v	Central Districts Stags (H); 161/7 (20 overs)
Lou Vincent 57 (49); Jacob Oram 3/36 (4 overs)		Mathew Sinclair 50 (38); Daryl Tuffey 2/25 (4 overs)

Auckland Aces won by 1 run
Saxton Oval, Nelson
Umpires: Dave Paterson, Evan Watkin

- Central Districts won the toss and chose to field.

17 January
14:00
Scorecard

(H) Wellington Firebirds	v	Otago Volts

Match abandoned
Basin Reserve, Wellington
Umpires: Mike George, Phil Jones

17 January
16:00
Scorecard

(H) Northern Districts Knights; 184/7 (20 overs)	v	Canterbury Wizards; 113 (15.4 overs)
Daniel Vettori 49 (41); Andrew Ellis 3/32 (4 overs)		Rob Nicol 31 (21); Bradley Scott 3/11 (3 overs)

Northern Districts Knights won by 71 runs
Seddon Park, Hamilton
Umpires: Barry Frost, Peter Gasston

- Canterbury won the toss and chose to field.

22 January
17:00
Scorecard

(H) Auckland Aces; 154 (19.2 overs)	v	Northern Districts Knights; 136/9 (20 overs)
Scott Styris 59 (38); Bradley Scott 3/44 (4 overs)		Tillakaratne Dilshan 26 (19); Roneel Hira 4/13 (4 overs)

Auckland Aces won by 18 runs
Colin Maiden Park, Auckland
Umpires: Evan Gray, Evan Watkin

- Northern Districts won the toss and chose to field.

22 January
17:00
Scorecard

(H) Otago Volts; 185/4 (20 overs)	v	Canterbury Wizards; 188/4 (19 overs)
Brendon McCullum 64 (44); Carl Frauenstein 1/28 (4 overs)		Shanan Stewart 56 (33); Neil Wagner 3/34 (4 overs)

Canterbury Wizards won by 6 wickets
University Oval, Dunedin
Umpires: Peter Gasston, Wayne Knights

- Otago Volts won the toss and chose to bat.

22 January
17:00
Scorecard

(H) Wellington Firebirds; 205/3 (20 overs)	v	Central Districts Stags; 119/6 (12.3 overs)
Neal Parlane 67 (32); Kieran Noema-Barnett 2/13 (2 overs)		Peter Ingram 55 (30); Paul Hitchcock 3/17 (2.3 overs)

Wellington Firebirds won by 19 runs (D/L)
Basin Reserve, Wellington
Umpires: Phil Jones, Tim Parlane

- Central Districts won the toss and chose to field.
- Bad light stopped Central Districts' innings at 12.3 overs.

24 January
14:00
Scorecard

(H) Canterbury Wizards; 160/8 (20 overs)	v	Auckland Aces; 161/4 (19 overs)
Rob Nicol 58 (33); Ravi Bopara 3/21 (4 overs)		Martin Guptill 97* (60); Chris Martin 2/22 (3 overs)

Auckland Aces won by 6 wickets
Village Green, Christchurch
Umpires: Chris Gaffaney, Derek Walker

- Auckland won the toss and chose to field.

24 January
14:00
Scorecard

(H) Otago Volts; 121/9 (20 overs)	v	Central Districts Stags; 127/6 (18.3 overs)
Neil Broom 38 (33); Seth Rance 2/14 (4 overs)		Jamie How 50 (36); Nick Beard 2/16 (2.3 overs)

Central Districts Stags won by 4 wickets
University Oval, Dunedin
Umpires: Peter Gasston, Wayne Knights

- Central Districts won the toss and chose to field.

24 January
14:00
Scorecard

Northern Districts Knights; 191/8 (20 overs)	v	Wellington Firebirds (H); 131 (18.3 overs)
Tillakaratne Dilshan 59 (42); Andy McKay 3/41 (4 overs)		Dewayne Bowden 34 (23); Bradley Scott 4/13 (4 overs)

Northern Districts Knights won by 60 runs
Basin Reserve, Wellington
Umpires: Barry Frost, Tim Parlane

- Northern Districts won the toss and chose to bat.

26 January
17:00
Scorecard

(H) Auckland Aces; 171/9 (20 overs)	v	Otago Volts; 171/9 (20 overs)
Anaru Kitchen 54 (39); Neil Wagner 3/35 (4 overs)		Nathan McCullum 61 (35); Michael Bates 3/24 (4 overs)

Otago Volts won by Super Over
Colin Maiden Park, Auckland
Umpires: Tim Parlane, Evan Watkin

- Otago won the toss and chose to field.

26 January
17:00
Scorecard

Wellington Firebirds; 162/5 (20 overs)	v	Canterbury Wizards (H); 155/7 (20 overs)
Cameron Merchant 57 (44); Craig McMillan 2/27 (4 overs)		Dean Brownlie 45* (33); Dewayne Bowden 2/23 (2 overs)

Wellington Firebirds won by 7 runs
Mainpower Oval, Rangiora
Umpires: Dave Paterson, Derek Walker

- Canterbury won the toss and chose to field.

26 January
17:00
Scorecard

(H) Northern Districts Knights; 148/9 (20 overs)	v	Central Districts Stags; 96/6 (11.3 overs)
James Marshall 59* (42); Graham Napier 3/33 (4 overs)		Ross Taylor 28* (12); Daniel Vettori 2/10 (2 overs)

Central Districts Stags won by 4 wickets (D/L)
Seddon Park, Hamilton
Umpires: Phil Jones, Dave Quested

- Northern Districts won the toss and chose to bat.
- Rain reduced Central Districts' target to 95 runs off 12 overs.

== Final ==
31 January
14:00
Scorecard

(H) Central Districts Stags; 206/6 (20 overs)	v	Auckland Aces; 128 (16.1 overs)
Ross Taylor 80 (30); Michael Bates 3/61 (4 overs)		Jimmy Neesham 39 (20); Michael Mason 2/17 (3 overs)

Central Districts Stags won by 78 runs
Pukekura Park, New Plymouth
Umpires: Gary Baxter, Barry Frost

- Auckland won the toss and chose to field.

== See also ==
- Plunket Shield
- New Zealand limited-overs cricket trophy
- 2009–10 Plunket Shield season
- 2009–10 New Zealand one-day cricket competition season
