= 2019–20 Super Smash (men's cricket) =

Cricket tournament

2019–20 Men's Super Smash
- Dates: 13 December 2019 – 19 January 2020
- Administrator: New Zealand Cricket
- Cricket format: Twenty20 cricket
- Tournament format(s): Round-robin and knockout
- Champions: Wellington Firebirds (3rd title)
- Participants: 6
- Matches: 32
- Most runs: Devon Conway (543)
- Most wickets: Hamish Bennett (17)
- Official website: Super Smash

The 2019–20 Dream11 Super Smash (named after the competition's sponsor Dream11) was the fifteenth season of the Men's Super Smash Twenty20 cricket tournament in New Zealand. It took place between December 2019 and January 2020. The Central Stags were the defending champions.

On 5 January 2020, in the match between the Canterbury Kings and the Northern Knights, Leo Carter hit six sixes in one over off the bowling of Anton Devcich. He was the fourth batsman to do this in a Twenty20 match, and the first by a New Zealand cricketer.

On 11 January 2020, the Otago Volts became the first team to qualify for the knockout section of the tournament, after they beat the Central Stags by nine wickets. The following day, the Auckland Aces and the Wellington Firebirds also confirmed their spots in the knockout stage of the competition. Wellington finished top of the table after the final group stage match, advancing directly to the final. Otago and Auckland advanced to the preliminary final, after finishing second and third respectively.

In the preliminary final, the Auckland Aces beat the Otago Volts by three wickets to join the Wellington Firebirds in the final. Wellington won the tournament, after they beat Auckland by 22 runs in the final.

== Points table ==
2019–20 Super Smash champions, the Wellington Firebirds celebrating their round-robin win against the Otago Volts at the Basin Reserve.

Pos	Team	Pld	W	L	T	NR	Pts	NRR
1	Wellington Firebirds	10	6	4	0	0	24	0.508
2	Otago Volts	10	5	4	0	1	22	0.465
3	Auckland Aces	10	4	4	0	2	20	−0.232
4	Central Stags	10	4	5	0	1	18	0.377
5	Canterbury Kings	10	4	5	0	1	18	−0.189
6	Northern Knights	10	4	5	0	1	18	−1.008

Advanced to the Final Advanced to the Preliminary Final

== Fixtures ==
=== Round-robin ===
13 December 2019
Scorecard

Central Stags; 221/5 (20 overs)	v	Northern Knights; 101 (13.5 overs)
Kieran Noema-Barnett 47 (25); Ish Sodhi 2/27 (4 overs)		Anton Devcich 35 (23); Kieran Noema-Barnett 3/10 (2 overs)

Central Stags won by 120 runs
McLean Park, Napier
Umpires: Chris Brown and Wayne Knights

- Central Stags won the toss and elected to bat.
- Ryan Watson (Central Stags) and Matthew Fisher (Northern Knights) both made their T20 debuts.

14 December 2019
Scorecard

Otago Volts; 210/6 (20 overs)	v	Auckland Aces; 197/5 (20 overs)
Neil Broom 93 (57); Mitchell McClenaghan 2/38 (4 overs)		Glenn Phillips 106* (61); Michael Rippon 2/20 (4 overs)

Otago Volts won by 13 runs
Eden Park Outer Oval, Auckland
Umpires: John Dempsey and Wayne Knights

- Otago Volts won the toss and elected to bat.
- Max Chu (Otago Volts) made his T20 debut.

15 December 2019
Scorecard

Canterbury Kings; 129 (19.4 overs)	v	Wellington Firebirds; 130/4 (18.4 overs)
Jack Boyle 35 (27); Jeetan Patel 3/16 (4 overs)		Rachin Ravindra 38 (27); Cole McConchie 3/18 (4 overs)

Wellington Firebirds won by 6 wickets
Hagley Oval, Christchurch
Umpires: Shaun Haig and Derek Walker

- Canterbury Kings won the toss and elected to bat.
- Jack Boyle (Canterbury Kings) and Jamie Gibson (Wellington Firebirds) both made their T20 debuts.

16 December 2019
Scorecard

Otago Volts; 198/9 (20 overs)	v	Northern Knights; 155 (19.4 overs)
Josh Finnie 47 (18); Daryl Mitchell 4/32 (4 overs)		Joe Carter 55 (32); Nathan Smith 5/14 (3.4 overs)

Otago Volts won by 43 runs
Seddon Park, Hamilton
Umpires: Chris Brown and Ashley Mehrotra

- Northern Knights won the toss and elected to field.

17 December 2019
Scorecard

Canterbury Kings; 72/1 (8 overs)	v	Auckland Aces
Jack Boyle 34 (25); Ronnie Hira 1/14 (2 overs)

No result
Hagley Oval, Christchurch
Umpires: Shaun Haig and John Bromley

- Auckland Aces won the toss and elected to field.
- Rain during the Canterbury Kings' innings prevented any further play.

18 December 2019
Scorecard

Central Stags; 183/6 (20 overs)	v	Wellington Firebirds; 159/9 (20 overs)
Tom Bruce 56 (34); Jeetan Patel 2/30 (4 overs)		James Neesham 37 (20); Ajaz Patel 3/20 (4 overs)

Central Stags won by 24 runs
Basin Reserve, Wellington
Umpires: John Dempsey and Garth Stirrat

- Central Stags won the toss and elected to bat.

19 December 2019
Scorecard

Otago Volts; 55/2 (7.4 overs)	v	Auckland Aces
Dean Foxcroft 20* (21); Mitchell McClenaghan 1/16 (2 overs)

No result
University Oval, Dunedin
Umpires: Shaun Haig and Derek Walker

- Auckland Aces won the toss and elected to field.
- Rain during the Auckland Aces' innings prevented any further play.

20 December 2019
Scorecard

Central Stags; 149/9 (20 overs)	v	Northern Knights
Tom Bruce 35 (27); Brett Randell 3/29 (4 overs)

No result
Seddon Park, Hamilton
Umpires: Chris Brown and Wayne Knights

- Central Stags won the toss and elected to bat.
- Rain during the innings break prevented any further play.

21 December 2019
Scorecard

Wellington Firebirds; 182/1 (20 overs)	v	Otago Volts; 181/4 (20 overs)
Michael Pollard 70 (40); Dean Foxcroft 1/32 (4 overs)		Nick Kelly 85 (53); James Neesham 2/24 (3 overs)

Wellington Firebirds won by 1 run
Basin Reserve, Wellington
Umpires: Chris Brown and John Bromley

- Wellington Firebirds won the toss and elected to bat.
- Fraser Colson (Wellington Firebirds) made his T20 debut.

22 December 2019
Scorecard

Northern Knights; 195/5 (20 overs)	v	Auckland Aces; 167/8 (20 overs)
Tim Seifert 75 (49); Ross ter Braak 2/23 (4 overs)		Sean Solia 44 (29); Scott Kuggeleijn 3/30 (4 overs)

Northern Knights won by 28 runs
Seddon Park, Hamilton
Umpires: Ashley Mehrotra and Tim Parlane

- Northern Knights won the toss and elected to bat.
- Ross ter Braak (Auckland Aces) made his T20 debut.

23 December 2019
Scorecard

Canterbury Kings; 164/8 (20 overs)	v	Central Stags; 134/9 (20 overs)
Andrew Ellis 35* (29); Kieran Noema-Barnett 3/19 (4 overs)		Dane Cleaver 22 (13); Blake Coburn 4/17 (4 overs)

Canterbury Kings won by 30 runs
McLean Park, Napier
Umpires: Billy Bowden and Garth Stirrat

- Canterbury Kings won the toss and elected to field.

27 December 2019
Scorecard

Wellington Firebirds; 196/8 (20 overs)	v	Central Stags; 154 (18.1 overs)
Devon Conway 89 (50); Willem Ludick 2/15 (2 overs)		Kieran Noema-Barnett 58 (38); Ollie Newton 5/45 (4 overs)

Wellington Firebirds won by 42 runs
Pukekura Park, New Plymouth
Umpires: Chris Brown and Wayne Knights

- Central Stags won the toss and elected to field.

28 December 2019
Scorecard

Auckland Aces; 210/4 (20 overs)	v	Central Stags; 208/7 (20 overs)
Mark Chapman 63* (29); Ryan Watson 2/42 (4 overs)		Tom Bruce 67 (41); Ben Lister 2/30 (4 overs)

Auckland Aces won by 2 runs
Pukekura Park, New Plymouth
Umpires: Chris Brown and Wayne Knights

- Auckland Aces won the toss and elected to bat.

29 December 2019
Scorecard

Northern Knights; 179/8 (20 overs)	v	Otago Volts; 185/4 (20 overs)
Tim Seifert 54 (31); Michael Rae 2/26 (3.1 overs)		Nick Kelly 54 (42); Daryl Mitchell 2/31 (3 overs)

Otago Volts won by 6 wickets
Molyneux Park, Alexandra
Umpires: Shaun Haig and John Dempsey

- Northern Knights won the toss and elected to bat.

30 December 2019
Scorecard

Auckland Aces; 133/9 (20 overs)	v	Wellington Firebirds; 137/3 (18.3 overs)
Martin Guptill 42 (34); Michael Bracewell 2/5 (2 overs)		Devon Conway 78* (54); Mark Chapman 1/17 (3 overs)

Wellington Firebirds won by 7 wickets
Eden Park Outer Oval, Auckland
Umpires: Wayne Knights and Ashley Mehrotra

- Auckland Aces won the toss and elected to bat.

30 December 2019
Scorecard

Otago Volts; 190/5 (20 overs)	v	Canterbury Kings; 139 (18.5 overs)
Josh Finnie 71* (36); Cole McConchie 2/32 (3 overs)		Cam Fletcher 37 (37); Michael Rae 3/25 (3.5 overs)

Otago Volts won by 51 runs
Molyneux Park, Alexandra
Umpires: Shaun Haig and Derek Walker

- Otago Volts won the toss and elected to field.
- Dale Phillips (Otago Volts) made his T20 debut.

1 January 2020
Scorecard

Canterbury Kings; 194/3 (20 overs)	v	Auckland Aces; 195/3 (19.3 overs)
Chad Bowes 90 (42); Ronnie Hira 1/31 (4 overs)		Martin Guptill 83* (52); Cole McConchie 1/23 (4 overs)

Auckland Aces won by 7 wickets
Eden Park Outer Oval, Auckland
Umpires: Chris Brown and Tim Parlane

- Auckland Aces won the toss and elected to field.

1 January 2020
Scorecard

Wellington Firebirds; 161/8 (20 overs)	v	Northern Knights; 162/5 (19 overs)
Devon Conway 32 (23); Ish Sodhi 3/12 (4 overs)		Daryl Mitchell 58 (35); Ollie Newton 2/32 (4 overs)

Northern Knights won by 5 wickets
Bay Oval, Mount Maunganui
Umpires: Billy Bowden and John Bromley

- Wellington Firebirds won the toss and elected to bat.

2 January 2020
Scorecard

Otago Volts; 184/7 (20 overs)	v	Central Stags; 186/5 (19 overs)
Nick Kelly 45 (24); Ajaz Patel 2/27 (4 overs)		Kieran Noema-Barnett 55 (30); Jacob Duffy 1/25 (3 overs)

Central Stags won by 5 wickets
McLean Park, Napier
Umpires: Wayne Knights and Tim Parlane

- Otago Volts won the toss and elected to bat.

3 January 2020
Scorecard

Wellington Firebirds; 188/4 (20 overs)	v	Northern Knights; 136 (18.3 overs)
Michael Pollard 51 (38); Daryl Mitchell 1/18 (2 overs)		Tim Seifert 35 (28); Hamish Bennett 3/28 (3.3 overs)

Wellington Firebirds won by 52 runs
Basin Reserve, Wellington
Umpires: Shaun Haig and Derek Walker

- Wellington Firebirds won the toss and elected to bat.

4 January 2020
Scorecard

Central Stags; 138/8 (20 overs)	v	Auckland Aces; 141/6 (19.3 overs)
Christian Leopard 27 (23); Mark Chapman 2/17 (4 overs)		Craig Cachopa 36 (32); Ryan Watson 2/19 (2.3 overs)

Auckland Aces won by 4 wickets
Eden Park Outer Oval, Auckland
Umpires: Chris Brown and Billy Bowden

- Auckland Aces won the toss and elected to field.

5 January 2020
Scorecard

Northern Knights; 219/7 (20 overs)	v	Canterbury Kings; 222/3 (18.5 overs)
Tim Seifert 74 (36); Cole McConchie 2/33 (4 overs)		Leo Carter 70* (29); Daryl Mitchell 1/22 (2 overs)

Canterbury Kings won by 7 wickets
Hagley Oval, Christchurch
Umpires: Wayne Knights and Ashley Mehrotra

- Northern Knights won the toss and elected to bat.
- Leo Carter (Canterbury Kings) hit six sixes in one over off the bowling of Anton Devcich.

6 January 2020
Scorecard

Otago Volts; 168/5 (20 overs)	v	Wellington Firebirds; 169/0 (16.3 overs)
Dean Foxcroft 82* (57); Michael Bracewell 2/32 (4 overs)		Devon Conway 101* (49)

Wellington Firebirds won by 10 wickets
University Oval, Dunedin
Umpires: Shaun Haig and Derek Walker

- Otago Volts won the toss and elected to bat.

7 January 2020
Scorecard

Central Stags; 181/8 (20 overs)	v	Canterbury Kings; 164/8 (20 overs)
Dane Cleaver 81 (51); Ed Nuttall 2/27 (3 overs)		Cam Fletcher 65* (37); Blair Tickner 4/26 (4 overs)

Central Stags won by 17 runs
Hagley Oval, Christchurch
Umpires: John Bromley and Ashley Mehrotra

- Central Stags won the toss and elected to bat.

9 January 2020
Scorecard

Canterbury Kings; 148/8 (20 overs)	v	Wellington Firebirds; 145/9 (20 overs)
Jack Boyle 46 (38); Hamish Bennett 3/27 (4 overs)		Devon Conway 51 (39); Will Williams 5/12 (2 overs)

Canterbury Kings won by 3 runs
Basin Reserve, Wellington
Umpires: Billy Bowden and Shaun Haig

- Canterbury Kings won the toss and elected to bat.
- Will Williams (Canterbury Kings) took a hat-trick.

10 January 2020
Scorecard

Auckland Aces; 170/7 (20 overs)	v	Northern Knights; 173/7 (19 overs)
Colin Munro 44 (33); Anurag Verma 3/35 (4 overs)		Anton Devcich 51 (23); Ronnie Hira 3/30 (4 overs)

Northern Knights won by 3 wickets
Eden Park Outer Oval, Auckland
Umpires: John Dempsey and John Bromley

- Northern Knights won the toss and elected to field.

11 January 2020
Scorecard

Central Stags; 139/6 (20 overs)	v	Otago Volts; 141/1 (17.3 overs)
Dane Cleaver 42 (31); Anaru Kitchen 2/22 (4 overs)		Hamish Rutherford 81* (54); Kieran Noema-Barnett 1/15 (3 overs)

Otago Volts won by 9 wickets
University Oval, Dunedin
Umpires: Shaun Haig and Eugene Sanders

- Central Stags won the toss and elected to bat.

12 January 2020
Scorecard

Canterbury Kings; 154/7 (20 overs)	v	Northern Knights; 156/5 (19.4 overs)
Cam Fletcher 59* (46); Anurag Verma 3/29 (4 overs)		Anton Devcich 57 (46); Will Williams 2/40 (3.4 overs)

Northern Knights won by 5 wickets
Bay Oval, Mount Maunganui
Umpires: Garth Stirrat and Tim Parlane

- Canterbury Kings won the toss and elected to bat.

12 January 2020
Scorecard

Wellington Firebirds; 165/7 (20 overs)	v	Auckland Aces; 166/4 (18 overs)
Devon Conway 69 (52); Kyle Jamieson 3/34 (4 overs)		Craig Cachopa 66 (43); Hamish Bennett 1/14 (3 overs)

Auckland Aces won by 6 wickets
Basin Reserve, Wellington
Umpires: Billy Bowden and John Dempsey

- Wellington Firebirds won the toss and elected to bat.

14 January 2020
Scorecard

Otago Volts; 167/5 (20 overs)	v	Canterbury Kings; 168/4 (18.5 overs)
Nick Kelly 62 (43); Will Williams 1/15 (3 overs)		Chad Bowes 95 (50); Jacob Duffy 2/27 (3.5 overs)

Canterbury Kings won by 6 wickets
Basin Reserve, Wellington
Umpires: Chris Brown and John Bromley

- Otago Volts won the toss and elected to bat.

=== Finals ===
Preliminary Final
17 January 2020
Scorecard

Otago Volts; 174/8 (20 overs)	v	Auckland Aces; 178/7 (19.5 overs)
Nick Kelly 60 (44); William Somerville 3/25 (4 overs)		Martin Guptill 43 (31); Michael Rae 3/23 (4 overs)

Auckland Aces won by 3 wickets
University Oval, Dunedin
Umpires: Chris Brown and Shaun Haig

- Auckland Aces won the toss and elected to field.

Final
19 January 2020
Scorecard

Wellington Firebirds; 168/7 (20 overs)	v	Auckland Aces; 146/9 (20 overs)
Devon Conway 49 (37); Mitchell McClenaghan 3/32 (4 overs)		Martin Guptill 60 (53); Logan van Beek 3/34 (4 overs)

Wellington Firebirds won by 22 runs
Basin Reserve, Wellington
Umpires: Chris Brown and Shaun Haig

- Auckland Aces won the toss and elected to field.
