= 2013–14 HRV Twenty20 =

- Dates: 1 November 2013 – 18 January 2014
- Administrator(s): New Zealand Cricket
- Cricket format: Twenty20
- Tournament format(s): Round-robin and knockout
- Champions: Northern Knights (1st title)
- Participants: 6
- Matches: 32
- Most runs: Daniel Flynn (278)
- Most wickets: James Fuller, Jono Boult (14)

The 2013–14 HRV Twenty20 (named after the competition's sponsor HRV) was the ninth season of the Men's Super Smash Twenty20 cricket tournament in New Zealand. The competition ran from 1 November 2013 to 18 January 2014. The tournament was won by the Northern Knights for the first time, after they defeated Otago Volts in the final by five wickets.

== Points table ==
Pos	Team	Pld	W	L	T	NR	Pts	NRR
1	Otago Volts	10	5	2	0	3	26	0.268
2	Northern Knights	10	6	4	0	0	24	0.451
3	Canterbury Kings	10	4	2	0	4	24	−0.206
4	Auckland Aces	10	5	5	0	0	20	0.211
5	Wellington Firebirds	10	4	4	0	2	20	−0.033
6	Central Stags	10	0	7	0	3	6	−1.199

Teams qualified for the finals

== Finals ==
=== Preliminary Final ===
17 January 2014
Scorecard

Northern Knights; 181/4 (20 overs)	v	Canterbury Kings; 178/7 (20 overs)
Kane Williamson 79* (55); Matt Henry 1/27 (3 overs)		Peter Fulton 88* (49); Chris Tremain 3/19 (3 overs)

Northern Knights won by 3 runs
Seddon Park, Hamilton
Umpires: Phil Jones and Tim Parlane

- Northern Knights won the toss and elected to bat.

=== Final ===
18 January 2014
Scorecard

Otago Volts; 143/5 (20 overs)	v	Northern Knights; 144/5 (19 overs)
Neil Broom 44 (38); Anton Devcich 1/9 (2 overs)		Daryl Mitchell 46* (42); Jason Holder 2/38 (4 overs)

Northern Knights won by 5 wickets
Seddon Park, Hamilton
Umpires: Phil Jones and Tim Parlane

- Otago Volts won the toss and elected to bat.
