= Bangladeshi cricket team in New Zealand in 2016–17 =

International cricket tour

	New Zealand	Bangladesh
- Dates: 22 December 2016 – 24 January 2017
Captains	Kane Williamson	Mashrafe Mortaza (ODIs & T20Is); Mushfiqur Rahim (1st Test); Tamim Iqbal (2nd Test)

Test series
- Result: New Zealand won the 2-match series 2–0
Most runs	Tom Latham (302)	Shakib Al Hasan (284)
Most wickets	Trent Boult (12)	Shakib Al Hasan (6)

One Day International series
- Results: New Zealand won the 3-match series 3–0
Most runs	Neil Broom (228)	Imrul Kayes (119)
Most wickets	Tim Southee (5)	Shakib Al Hasan (5)

Twenty20 International series
- Results: New Zealand won the 3-match series 3–0
Most runs	Kane Williamson (145)	Mahmudullah (89)
Most wickets	Ish Sodhi (5)	Rubel Hossain (7)

The Bangladeshi cricket team toured New Zealand from December 2016 to January 2017 to play two Test matches, three One Day Internationals (ODIs) and three Twenty20 International (T20Is). New Zealand won both the ODI and T20I series 3–0 and won the Test series 2–0.

== Squads ==
ODIs		T20Is		Tests	
New Zealand	Bangladesh	New Zealand	Bangladesh	New Zealand	Bangladesh
Kane Williamson (c); Trent Boult; Neil Broom; Lockie Ferguson; Colin de Grandhomme; Martin Guptill; Matt Henry; Tom Latham; Colin Munro; James Neesham; Jeetan Patel; Luke Ronchi (wk); Mitchell Santner; Tim Southee	Mashrafe Mortaza (c); Taskin Ahmed; Tanbir Hayder; Mehedi Hasan; Nurul Hasan (wk); Shakib Al Hasan; Mosaddek Hossain; Rubel Hossain; Tamim Iqbal; Imrul Kayes; Mahmudullah; Mustafizur Rahman; Sabbir Rahman; ~~Mushfiqur Rahim (wk)~~; Subashis Roy; Soumya Sarkar	Kane Williamson (c); Corey Anderson; Tom Blundell (wk); Trent Boult; ~~Neil Broom~~; Tom Bruce; Colin de Grandhomme; ~~Martin Guptill~~; Lockie Ferguson; Matt Henry; Colin Munro; James Neesham; ~~Luke Ronchi (wk)~~; Mitchell Santner; Ish Sodhi; Ben Wheeler; George Worker	Mashrafe Mortaza (c); Shakib Al Hasan (vc); Taskin Ahmed; Nurul Hasan (wk); Shuvagata Hom; Mosaddek Hossain; Rubel Hossain; Tamim Iqbal; Taijul Islam; Imrul Kayes; Mahmudullah; Mustafizur Rahman; Sabbir Rahman; Subashis Roy; Soumya Sarkar	Kane Williamson (c); Trent Boult; Dean Brownlie; Colin de Grandhomme; Matt Henry; Tom Latham; Henry Nicholls; Jeet Raval; Mitchell Santner; Tim Southee; Ross Taylor; Neil Wagner; BJ Watling (wk)	~~Mushfiqur Rahim~~ (c, wk); Taskin Ahmed; Shakib Al Hasan; Nurul Hasan; ~~Mominul Haque~~; Mehedi Hasan; Nurul Hasan (wk); Rubel Hossain; Tamim Iqbal; Taijul Islam; ~~Imrul Kayes~~; Mahmudullah; Kamrul Islam Rabbi; Sabbir Rahman; Subashis Roy; Soumya Sarkar; Najmul Hossain Shanto

Mushfiqur Rahim suffered a hamstring injury in the first ODI and as a result, he was ruled out of the remaining ODI and T20I matches. He was replaced by Nurul Hasan. Jeetan Patel was added to New Zealand's squad for the third ODI. Martin Guptill suffered a hamstring injury during the third ODI match and was ruled out of the T20I series. He was replaced by Neil Broom. Broom was later ruled out because of a fractured finger which he sustained during the first T20I and was replaced by George Worker. Luke Ronchi suffered an injury in the second T20I and was replaced by Tom Blundell. Mushfiqur Rahim, Imrul Kayes and Mominul Haque were all ruled out of the second Test due to injury. Tamim Iqbal was selected as captain in place of Mushfiqur with Nurul Hasan and Najmul Hossain Shanto also added to the squad.

== Tour match ==
=== 50 over match: New Zealand XI v Bangladeshis ===
22 December 2016
Scorecard

Bangladeshis (Bangladesh); 245/8 (43 overs)	v	New Zealand XI; 247/7 (41.4 overs)
Mushfiqur Rahim 45 (41); Shawn Hicks 2/30 (6 overs)		Ben Horne 60* (53); Shakib Al Hasan 3/41 (7 overs)

New Zealand XI won by 3 wickets (DLS method)
Cobham Oval, Whangārei
Umpires: Chris Brown (NZ) and Shaun Haig (NZ)

- Bangladeshis won the toss and elected to bat.
- Rain reduced the match to 43 overs per side.

== ODI series ==
=== 1st ODI ===
26 December 2016
11:00
Scorecard

New Zealand; 341/7 (50 overs)	v	Bangladesh; 264 (44.5 overs)
Tom Latham 137 (121); Shakib Al Hasan 3/69 (10 overs)		Shakib Al Hasan 59 (54); James Neesham 3/36 (7 overs)

New Zealand won by 77 runs
Hagley Oval, Christchurch
Umpires: Wayne Knights (NZ) and Chettithody Shamshuddin (Ind)
Player of the match: Tom Latham (NZ)

- New Zealand won the toss and elected to bat.
- Wayne Knights (NZ) stood in his first ODI as an umpire.
- Kane Williamson became the fastest player for New Zealand to score 4,000 runs in ODIs.

=== 2nd ODI ===
29 December 2016
11:00
Scorecard

New Zealand; 251 (50 overs)	v	Bangladesh; 184 (42.4 overs)
Neil Broom 109* (107); Mashrafe Mortaza 3/49 (10 overs)		Imrul Kayes 59 (89); Kane Williamson 3/22 (5 overs)

New Zealand won by 67 runs
Saxton Oval, Nelson
Umpires: Chris Brown (NZ) and Paul Reiffel (Aus)
Player of the match: Neil Broom (NZ)

- Bangladesh won the toss and elected to field.
- Chris Brown (NZ) stood in his first ODI as an umpire.
- Nurul Hasan, Subashis Roy and Tanbir Hayder (Ban) all made their ODI debuts.
- Neil Broom (NZ) scored his first century in ODIs.

=== 3rd ODI ===
31 December 2016
11:00
Scorecard

Bangladesh; 236/9 (50 overs)	v	New Zealand; 239/2 (41.2 overs)
Tamim Iqbal 59 (88); Mitchell Santner 2/38 (10 overs)		Neil Broom 97 (97); Mustafizur Rahman 2/32 (9.2 overs)

New Zealand won by 8 wickets
Saxton Oval, Nelson
Umpires: Chris Brown (NZ) and Chettithody Shamshuddin (Ind)
Player of the match: Kane Williamson (NZ)

- Bangladesh won the toss and elected to bat.
- Neil Broom and Kane Williamson's 179-run partnership is New Zealand's highest ever second-wicket partnership in ODIs.

== T20I series ==
=== 1st T20I ===
3 January 2017
19:00 (D/N)
Scorecard

Bangladesh; 141/8 (20 overs)	v	New Zealand; 143/4 (18 overs)
Mahmudullah 52 (47); Lockie Ferguson 3/32 (4 overs)		Kane Williamson 73* (55); Mustafizur Rahman 1/21 (4 overs)

New Zealand won by 6 wickets
McLean Park, Napier
Umpires: Shaun Haig (NZ) and Wayne Knights (NZ)
Player of the match: Kane Williamson (NZ)

- Bangladesh won the toss and elected to bat.
- Shaun Haig and Wayne Knights (NZ) both stood in their first T20I as umpires.
- Tom Bruce, Lockie Ferguson and Ben Wheeler (NZ) all made their T20I debuts.
- Mashrafe Mortaza (Ban) played his 50th T20I.
- McLean Park became the sixth venue in New Zealand to host a T20I.
- Kane Williamson became the fourth New Zealand player to reach 1,000 runs in T20Is.
- Lockie Ferguson (NZ) took a wicket with his first delivery, and became the second bowler to take two wickets with his first two T20I deliveries.

=== 2nd T20I ===
6 January 2017
15:00 (D/N)
Scorecard

New Zealand; 195/7 (20 overs)	v	Bangladesh; 148 (18.1 overs)
Colin Munro 101 (54); Rubel Hossain 3/37 (4 overs)		Sabbir Rahman 48 (32); Ish Sodhi 3/36 (4 overs)

New Zealand won by 47 runs
Bay Oval, Mount Maunganui
Umpires: Chris Brown (NZ) and Shaun Haig (NZ)
Player of the match: Colin Munro (NZ)

- Bangladesh won the toss and elected to field.
- Chris Brown (NZ) stood in his first T20I as an umpire.
- Colin Munro (NZ) became the third player for New Zealand to score a century in a T20I.

=== 3rd T20I ===
8 January 2017
15:00 (D/N)
Scorecard

New Zealand; 194/4 (20 overs)	v	Bangladesh; 167/6 (20 overs)
Corey Anderson 94* (41); Rubel Hossain 3/31 (4 overs)		Soumya Sarkar 42 (28); Ish Sodhi 2/22 (4 overs)

New Zealand won by 27 runs
Bay Oval, Mount Maunganui
Umpires: Chris Brown (NZ) and Wayne Knights (NZ)
Player of the match: Corey Anderson (NZ)

- Bangladesh won the toss and elected to field.
- Tom Blundell (NZ) made his T20I debut.
- Corey Anderson broke the record for the most sixes hit by a New Zealander in a T20I (10).
- Anderson's score of 94 was the highest individual score at batting at number 5 in T20Is.
- Anderson and Kane Williamson's 124-run partnership was New Zealand's highest ever fourth-wicket partnership in T20Is.

== Test series ==
=== 1st Test ===
12–16 January 2017
Scorecard

Bangladesh	v	New Zealand
595/8d (152 overs); Shakib Al Hasan 217 (276); Neil Wagner 4/151 (44 overs)		539 (148.2 overs); Tom Latham 177 (329); Kamrul Islam Rabbi 3/87 (26 overs)
160 (57.5 overs); Sabbir Rahman 50 (101); Trent Boult 3/53 (13.5 overs)		217/3 (39.4 overs); Kane Williamson 104* (90); Mehedi Hasan 2/66 (11.4 overs)

New Zealand won by 7 wickets
Basin Reserve, Wellington
Umpires: Marais Erasmus (SA) and Paul Reiffel (Aus)
Player of the match: Tom Latham (NZ)

- New Zealand won the toss and elected to field.
- Only 40.2 overs were possible on day 1 due to rain and bad light.
- Rain on day 3 brought play to an end with two overs left.
- Subashis Roy and Taskin Ahmed (Ban) both made their Test debuts.
- Shakib Al Hasan's scored his 3,000 runs in Tests.
- Mushfiqur Rahim and Shakib Al Hasan's 359-run partnership was Bangladesh's highest ever in Tests.
- Tom Latham (NZ) scored his 2,000th run in Tests.
- Imrul Kayes (Ban) took the most catches by a substitute wicket-keeper in an innings of a Test (5).
- Bangladesh's first-innings score was the largest total that resulted in a loss in a Test.

=== 2nd Test ===
20–24 January 2017
Scorecard

Bangladesh	v	New Zealand
289 (84.3 overs); Soumya Sarkar 86 (104); Tim Southee 5/94 (28.3 overs)		354 (92.4 overs); Henry Nicholls 98 (149); Shakib Al Hasan 4/50 (12.4 overs)
173 (52.5 overs); Mahmudullah 38 (67); Neil Wagner 3/44 (12 overs)		111/1 (18.4 overs); Tom Latham 41* (59); Kamrul Islam Rabbi 1/21 (3 overs)

New Zealand won by 9 wickets
Hagley Oval, Christchurch
Umpires: Nigel Llong (Eng) and Paul Reiffel (Aus)
Player of the match: Tim Southee (NZ)

- New Zealand won the toss and elected to field.
- 19 overs on day 2 were lost due to rain and no play was possible on day 3 due to rain.
- Najmul Hossain Shanto and Nurul Hasan (Ban) both made their Test debuts.
- Tamim Iqbal (Ban) played his first Test match as captain.
- Ross Taylor became the third New Zealand player to reach 6,000 runs in Tests.
- Tim Southee (NZ) took his 200th Test wicket.
