= Reece Young =

New Zealand cricketer

Personal information
- Full name: Reece Alan Young
- Born: 15 September 1979 (age 47); Auckland, New Zealand
- Batting: Right-handed
- Role: Wicket-keeper

International information
- National side: New Zealand
- Test debut (cap 250): 7 January 2011 v Pakistan
- Last Test: 9 December 2011 v Australia

Domestic team information
- Years: Team
- 1998/99–2009/10: Auckland
- 2010/11-2011/12: Canterbury
- 2012/13: Auckland

Career statistics
Competition	Test	FC	LA	T20
Matches	5	126	84	45
Runs scored	169	4,633	1,473	211
Batting average	24.15	30.28	27.69	9.59
100s/50s	0/1	8/26	1/5	0/0
Top score	57	126*	119	29
Balls bowled	–	42	6	–
Wickets	–	1	0	–
Bowling average	–	68.00	–	–
5 wickets in innings	–	0	–	–
10 wickets in match	–	0	–	–
Best bowling	–	1/65	–	–
Catches/stumpings	8/–	321/5	84/14	24/6
- Source: Cricinfo, 2 May 2017

Reece Alan Young (born 15 September 1979) is a New Zealand former Test cricketer who played for Auckland and Canterbury. He was the 250th Test cap for New Zealand.

== Domestic career ==
Young made his debut as a keeper/batsman for the Auckland Aces in the 1998/99 season. His career spanned 15 seasons and included playing for the Canterbury Wizards from 2010 to 2012 from where he was selected to represent NZ. Young suffered a near career ending ankle injury playing for Auckland in late 2007 as a result of a collision when taking a catch with teammate Martin Guptill. His injury kept him out of all cricket for 9 months with ongoing rehab. Young progressed well and once deemed fit returned to professional cricket being selected in late 2008 for the New Zealand 'A' tour of Australia and India. On 21 January 2009, Young scored his maiden one-day century (119) for Auckland against Northern Districts. This was a productive season for Young, also becoming Aucklands Batsman of the season with the most runs and an average of over 50. 2009 also saw him tour Sri Lanka with the Blackcaps.

Before Young got called up for New Zealand, he carried out stints as a professional in the UK. Young has played all over the UK with his last stint being Heyside Cricket Club, Oldham, Greater Manchester where he showcased his skills with the bat and also a superb keeper.

== International career ==
On 21 August 2009 Young was called into the New Zealand Cricket team to keep wicket in a test match against Sri Lanka at Galle when both test keeper Brendon McCullum and backup Jesse Ryder were struck down with a stomach bug.

Following that, Young picked up his first Test Cap for New Zealand in January 2011 vs Pakistan on his 100th first class match. He scored his maiden test 50 in only his second test against the same opposition and was also part of the Blackcap’s XI who famously beat Australia at Hobart in 2011, the first time a NZ Test team had won on Australian soil since 1985.

== Beyond cricket ==
After retiring from cricket, Young took up business opportunities in Auckland initially with Players Sports NZ before moving to lifestyle brand Triumph & Disaster. He was later involved with independent construction equipment hire company, NJC Equipment Hire as General Manager.
