= Anthony Bullick =

New Zealand cricketer (born 1985)

Personal information
- Full name: Anthony David Bullick
- Born: 30 July 1985 (age 41); Hamilton, New Zealand
- Batting: Right-handed
- Bowling: Right-arm medium-fast

Domestic team information
- Years: Team
- 2007/08–2010/11: Otago
- Source: ESPNcricinfo, 6 May 2016

Anthony David Bullick (born 30 July 1985) is a New Zealand former cricketer. He played eight first-class and five List A matches for Otago between the 2007–08 and 2010–11 seasons.

Bullick was born at Hamilton in 1985 and educated at King's College in Auckland before gaining a degree in Tourism and Marketing from the University of Otago. He played under-17 cricket for Auckland in the 2000–01 season, and went on to make his senior representative debut for Otago in a November 2007 first-class match against Wellington at the Basin Reserve. Primarily a bowler, Bullick took a total of 15 first-class wickets in his eight matches, with best innings bowling figures of 3/51.

After playing in England for St Helens Recreation in the Liverpool Premier League in 2008 and Banbury Cricket Club in the Home Counties Premier League in 2009, he played five List A matches for Otago in the 2009–10 season. These were Bullick's only List A matches; he took 14 wickets and was described by the Otago Daily Times as "one of the finds of the season" with "a very bright future". He took his best List A bowling figures of 4/60 in his final match, as well as scoring a rapid 33 not out to guide Otago to victory. A hip injury during the following season restricted Bullick to just two first-class matches for Otago, his final senior matches.

Although he had earned an Otago contract for the 2011–12 season, a back injury―described as "debilitating" and caused by a bulging disk―forced Bullick to retire from professional cricket in October 2011.
