= Leo Carter =

New Zealand cricketer (born 1994)

Personal information
- Full name: Leo James Carter
- Born: 10 December 1994 (age 31); Wellington, New Zealand
- Batting: Left-handed
- Bowling: Right-arm spin
- Role: Batter
- Relatives: Bob Carter (father)

Domestic team information
- Years: Team
- 2014/15–2023/24: Canterbury
- 2024/25: Otago
- FC debut: 9 March 2015 Canterbury v Northern Districts
- LA debut: 30 December 2014 Canterbury v Auckland

Career statistics
Competition	FC	LA	T20
Matches	63	61	74
Runs scored	2,910	1,571	1,149
Batting average	29.69	36.53	22.98
100s/50s	3/14	2/12	0/5
Top score	226*	107	88*
Catches/stumpings	68/–	21/–	31/–
- Source: CricInfo, 25 March 2025

Leo James Carter (born 10 December 1994) is a New Zealand cricketer who plays for Otago. He is the son of former Canterbury and Northamptonshire batsman, and former New Zealand women's national cricket team coach, Bob Carter.

Carter played for Canterbury for ten seasons, scoring 2,686 first-class runs, 1,238 List A runs and 999 Twenty20 runs, leaving the province as the team's eighth highest Twenty20 run scorer.

== Career ==
Carter was born at Wellington in 1994 and educated at St Andrew's College, Christchurch and Lincoln University. He played age-group cricket for Canterbury and made his debut for the New Zealand under-19 team in April 2013 before going on to be part of New Zealand's squad for the 2014 ICC Under-19 Cricket World Cup. He made his senior provincial debut at the end of 2014. He spent the 2015 off-season on a cricket scholarship in the United Kingdom, playing Second XI cricket for Northamptonshire and Surrey County Cricket Clubs, before establishing himself as a key member of the Cantrbury team.

Described as an "elegant" left-handed batter who was one of Canterbury's "most reliable and consistent performers", Carter became the first New Zealander to hit six sixes in one over. He achieved this in a January 2020 Super Smach match between against Northern Districts off of the bowling of Anton Devcich, becoming the fourth batsman to his six sixes from an over in Twenty20 cricket.

In February 2020, in a match against Wellington in the 2019–20 Plunket Shield season, Carter scored his maiden double century in first-class cricket, finishing with an unbeaten 226. In June 2020, he was offered a contract by Canterbury ahead of the 2020–21 domestic cricket season, and in November 2020, he was named as the captain of Canterbury ahead of their 2020–21 Ford Trophy campaign.

Carter announced that he would leave Canterbury in July 2024. He joined Otago later the same month.
