= Subashis Roy =

Bangladeshi cricketer (born 1988)

Shubashis Roy
Personal information
- Full name: Subashis Roy
- Born: 29 November 1988 (age 37); Sylhet, Bangladesh
- Nickname: Shuvo
- Height: 1.8 m (5 ft 11 in)
- Batting: Right-handed
- Bowling: Right-arm fast medium
- Role: Bowler

International information
- National side: Bangladesh
- Test debut (cap 82): 12 January 2017 v New Zealand
- Last Test: 6 October 2017 v South Africa
- Only ODI (cap 121): 29 December 2016 v New Zealand
- ODI shirt no.: 10

Domestic team information
- Years: Team
- 2007–: Bangladesh Cricket Board Academy
- 2007–: Rangpur Division
- 2012: Sylhet Division
- 2015–: Sylhet Super Stars

Career statistics
| Competition | Test | ODI | FC | LA |
|---|---|---|---|---|
| Matches | 4 | 1 | 67 | 71 |
| Runs scored | 14 | 1 | 171 | 58 |
| Batting average | 14.00 | – | 3.71 | 5.80 |
| 100s/50s | 0/0 | 0/0 | 0/0 | 0/0 |
| Top score | 12* | 1* | 33 | 12* |
| Balls bowled | 749 | 60 | 10,221 | 3,430 |
| Wickets | 9 | 1 | 172 | 84 |
| Bowling average | 51.66 | 45.00 | 30.33 | 31.61 |
| 5 wickets in innings | 0 | 0 | 3 | 0 |
| 10 wickets in match | 0 | 0 | 0 | 0 |
| Best bowling | 3/118 | 1/45 | 5/18 | 4/30 |
| Catches/stumpings | 0/– | 0/– | 21/– | 15/– |
Medal record
Representing Bangladesh
Men's Cricket
South Asian Games
| Gold medal – first place | 2010 Dhaka | Team |
- Source: ESPNCricinfo, 30 January 2026

Subashis Roy (born 29 November 1988) is a Bangladeshi bowler who represents Sylhet Division in first-class and list A cricket and the Chittagong Vikings franchise in the Bangladesh Premier League. He is a right-handed batsman and right-arm fast medium bowler.

== Domestic career ==
On his first-class debut for Sylhet Division on 10 November 2007, Roy claimed seven wickets in the match against Barisal Division. He was part of Bangladesh Under-19 squad for their home series against Sri Lanka U-19s and his five-for in Fatullah helped Bangladesh win the series.

In November 2016, he was named in a 22-man preparatory squad to train in Australia, ahead of Bangladesh's tour to New Zealand.

In October 2018, he was named in the squad for the Khulna Titans team, following the draft for the 2018–19 Bangladesh Premier League.

== International career ==
In December 2016 he was named in Bangladesh's One Day International (ODI) squad for their series against New Zealand. On 29 December 2016, he made his ODI debut at Nelson, in the second match of the same series. He made his Test debut for Bangladesh against New Zealand on 12 January 2017.
