= Heinrich Malan =

South African cricket coach (born 1981)

Personal information
- Born: 6 April 1981 (age 45); Pretoria, South Africa
- Batting: Right-handed
- Bowling: Right-arm medium
- Role: Batsman, coach

Head coaching information
- Years: Team
- 2013–2019; 2026-: Central Districts
- 2019–2022: Auckland
- 2022–2026: Ireland
- Source: ESPNcricinfo, 16 May 2022

Heinrich Malan (6 April 1981) is a South African cricket coach and former first-class cricketer. He was head coach of the Irish cricket team from 2022 to 2026.

== Coaching career ==
He was head coach of Central Districts Stags from June 2013 to March 2019, coaching the side to five national titles - the one-day Ford Trophy in 2014/15 and 2015/16, Burger King Super Smash T20 in 2018/19, and first-class Plunket Shield in 2019/19.

In April 2019 he was appointed head coach of the Auckland Aces (Auckland Cricket Association).

In January 2022, Cricket Ireland appointed Malan as the head coach of Irish cricket team for a three-year contract. Malan stepped down from the role on 29 June 2026 after whitewashing India in a T20 series.

In August 2026, Central Districts Stags announced that Heinrich Malan was returning as Head Coach of the team in all formats.
