= Darren Broom =

New Zealand cricketer (born 1985)

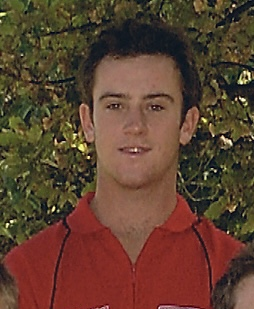
- Broom in 2005

Personal information
- Full name: Darren John Broom
- Born: 16 September 1985 (age 41); Christchurch, Canterbury, New Zealand
- Nickname: Dazza
- Batting: Right-handed
- Bowling: Right-arm medium
- Role: Top-order batsman
- Relatives: Neil Broom (brother)

Domestic team information
- Years: Team
- 2007/08–2008/09: Canterbury
- 2009/10–2012/13: Otago
- FC debut: 20 March 2010 Otago v Northern Districts
- Last FC: 20 February 2013 Otago v Wellington
- LA debut: 6 February 2008 Canterbury v Northern Districts
- Last LA: 3 March 2013 Otago v Northern Districts

Career statistics
Competition	FC	LA	T20
Matches	19	28	9
Runs scored	651	535	23
Batting average	24.11	25.47	7.66
100s/50s	2/2	0/4	0/0
Top score	119	83*	20
Balls bowled	126	12	–
Wickets	1	0	–
Bowling average	68.00	–	–
5 wickets in innings	0	–	–
10 wickets in match	0	–	–
Best bowling	1/7	–	–
Catches/stumpings	8/–	8/–	1/–
- Source: CricketArchive, 2 August 2016

Darren John Broom (born 16 September 1985) is a New Zealand cricketer. Broom is a right-handed batsman and very occasional right-arm medium bowler. A brother of Neil Broom, he played Twenty20 and one day cricket for Canterbury and Otago. In the Hawke Cup, Broom played in North Otago's successful challenge against Manawatu in 2010, scoring a century in the second innings, helping them take the Cup to Oamaru for the first time.

Broom was born at Christchurch and educated at Christchurch Boys' High School.
