= Peter Ingram =

New Zealand cricketer

Personal information
- Full name: Peter John Ingram
- Born: 25 October 1978 (age 48); Hāwera, Taranaki, New Zealand
- Batting: Right-handed
- Bowling: Right-arm off break
- Role: Batsman

International information
- National side: New Zealand
- Test debut (cap 245): 15 February 2010 v Bangladesh
- Last Test: 19 March 2010 v Bangladesh
- ODI debut (cap 158): 5 February 2010 v Bangladesh
- Last ODI: 19 August 2010 v Sri Lanka
- T20I debut (cap 42): 3 February 2010 v Bangladesh
- Last T20I: 28 February 2010 v Australia

Domestic team information
- Years: Team
- 2001/02–2011/12: Central Districts

Career statistics
Competition	Test	ODI	T20I	FC
Matches	2	8	3	82
Runs scored	61	193	22	5,623
Batting average	15.25	27.57	11.00	39.87
100s/50s	0/0	0/1	0/0	17/21
Top score	42	69	20*	247
Balls bowled	0	0	0	96
Wickets	–	–	–	0
Bowling average	–	–	–	–
5 wickets in innings	–	–	–	–
10 wickets in match	–	–	–	–
Best bowling	–	–	–	–
Catches/stumpings	0/–	3/–	1/–	47/–
- Source: CricketArchive, 4 October 2024

Peter John Ingram (born 25 October 1978) is a former New Zealand cricketer, who played for Central Districts. He is a right-handed batsman primarily, and is an occasional right arm off spin bowler. He is the fastest male cricketer to earn his first cap in all three formats of international cricket, doing so in the space of twelve days.

His batting style is akin to Virender Sehwag, with minimal foot movement, and he has credited Sehwag to helping his batting improve.

== Early life ==
Whilst being a talented cricketer, Ingram was also considered to represent his hometown in rugby. However, he gave up rugby when he broke his jaw during a trial.

== Domestic career ==
Ingram has played for the Central Stags since 2001, becoming an integral part of an opening pair, with Jamie How.

In late March 2009, Ingram scored 166, with partnerships of 159 with How and 115 with George Worker, to help Central Districts defeat Canterbury and qualify for the State Championship final, where Auckland took out the title. He would follow this up with an unbeaten 245, in a partnership of 428 (breaking the record for first-class opening record for New Zealand) with How, to lead Central Districts to an unlikely win against Wellington.

In the 2009–10 HRV Cup Final, Ingram hit 54 off 36 balls, setting a strong position that led to Central Stags claiming the title.

In what turned out to be his last game for Central Districts, Ingram made 97 off 54 in a 201 run opening partnership with How, who made 102, in an HRV Cup T20 match. The opening partnership between Ingram and How of 201 was the highest ever opening stand in T20 cricket at the time.

== International career ==
Ingram was a regular player in the NZ A team, and in January 2010, he was selected for the Black Caps 20/20 and ODI squads to play Bangladesh. He scored 69 in his debut ODI match, which remained his highest international score. The next month, he was also selected for the Test squad, replacing the out-of-form Daniel Flynn. He was retained for the Series vs Australia but did not make an impact and was replaced by returning batsman and domestic teammate Mathew Sinclair.

He was recalled into the side for a triangular series in July against Sri Lanka and India after Jesse Ryder suffered an elbow injury and Aaron Redmond was unavailable. This was his last international series, as he was dropped after the series. He retired from international cricket in 2011, after being left out of the World Cup squad and not getting a call to say he hadn't made it, despite having the 3rd highest One Day average for New Zealand.

== Retirement ==
On 9 March 2012 Ingram announced his retirement from first-class cricket. He stated that an Achilles tendon injury and wanting to spend more time with his family were reasons for his retirement. However, he still plays for Taranaki in the Hawke Cup, where he regularly bowls and bats in the middle order.

== Tractor Incident ==
In 2014, whilst moving cattle, his tractor plunged off a cliff. He managed to jump off the tractor, but landed in the path of it. It ran him over, crushing a couple of vertebrae and dislocating his knee. He popped his knee back into place and walked a kilometre to his neighbours to get help. He was hospitalized for a week before being discharged.

== Personal life ==
Ingram is married and has two sons.

Ingram taught at New Plymouth's Francis Douglas Memorial College, teaching Technology and currently teaches at Waitara High School.
