= 2011–12 HRV Cup =

- Administrator: New Zealand Cricket
- Cricket format: Twenty20
- Tournament format(s): Double round-robin and final
- Champions: Auckland Aces (3rd Title)
- Participants: 6
- Matches: 31
- Most runs: Martin Guptill (504)
- Most wickets: Ronnie Hira (14)

The 2011–12 HRV Cup (named after the competition's sponsor HRV) was the seventh season of the Men's Super Smash Twenty20 cricket tournament in New Zealand. The season was played between 18 December 2011 and 22 January 2012. The winners of the tournament were the Auckland Aces who beat the Canterbury Wizards by 44 runs in the final.

== Teams ==
Club	Home ground	Captain
Auckland Aces	Colin Maiden Park	Gareth Hopkins
Canterbury Wizards	Mainpower Oval	Peter Fulton
Central Districts Stags	Pukekura Park	Jamie How
Northern Knights	Seddon Park	Scott Styris
Otago Volts	University Oval	Brendon McCullum
Wellington Firebirds	Basin Reserve	Grant Elliott

== Standings ==
Pos	Team	Pld	W	L	NR	Pts	NRR
1	Auckland Aces	10	7	2	1	30	0.771
2	Canterbury Wizards	10	6	2	2	28	1.135
3	Northern Knights	10	4	5	1	18	0.077
4	Otago Volts	10	3	4	3	18	−0.318
5	Central Districts Stags	10	3	5	2	16	−0.049
6	Wellington Firebirds	10	2	7	1	10	−1.503

Source: Full table on cricinfo

== League Progression ==
	Group matches										Knockout
Team	1	2	3	4	5	6	7	8	9	10	F
Auckland Aces	4	8	8	10	14	18	22	26	30	30	W
Canterbury Wizards	0	4	6	10	10	14	18	20	24	28	L
Northern Knights	4	4	6	6	6	10	10	14	18	18	
Otago Volts	4	4	6	10	10	10	12	14	14	18	
Central Districts Stags	0	4	6	8	12	12	12	12	12	16	
Wellington Firebirds	0	0	4	4	8	8	10	10	10	10	
Note: The total points at the end of each group match are listed. Note: Click on the points (group matches) or W/L (Knockout) to see the summary for the match.				Win			Loss			No result	
Note: The total points at the end of each group match are listed. Note: Click on the points (group matches) or W/L (Knockout) to see the summary for the match.				Team was eliminated before the league reached this stage.							

== Results ==
Visitor team →	Auckland	Canterbury	Central Districts	Northern Districts	Otago	Wellington
Home team ↓	Auckland	Canterbury	Central Districts	Northern Districts	Otago	Wellington
Auckland Aces		Canterbury; 7 wickets	Auckland; 7 wickets	Auckland; 3 wickets	Auckland; 30 runs	Auckland; 10 runs
Canterbury Wizards	Auckland; 4 wickets		Canterbury; 4 wickets	Northern Districts; 5 runs	Canterbury; 6 runs	Canterbury; 70 runs
Central Districts Stags	Abandoned; No result	Abandoned; No result		Northern Districts; 23 runs	Central Districts; 28 runs	Central Districts; 53 runs
Northern Knights	Auckland; 6 wickets	Canterbury; 16 runs	Northern Districts; 8 wickets		Otago; 9 wickets	Wellington; 8 wickets
Otago Volts	Auckland; 8 wickets	Abandoned; No result	Otago; 4 wickets	Abandoned; No result		Otago; 7 wickets
Wellington Firebirds	Wellington; 7 wickets	Canterbury; 61 runs	Central Districts; 25 runs	Northern Districts; 34 runs	Abandoned; No result	

Note: Results listed are according to the home and visitor teams.
Note: Click on the results to see match summary.

Home team won	Visitor team won	Match abandoned

== Final ==
22 January
14:00
Scorecard

Auckland Aces (H); 196/5 (20 overs)	v	Canterbury Wizards; 152/10 (18.3 overs)
Martin Guptill 70 (41); Yasir Arafat 2/35 (4 overs)		AM Ellis 41 (17); MD Bates 3/18 (3 overs)

Auckland Aces won by 44 runs
Colin Maiden Park, Auckland
Umpires: GAV Baxter and CB Gaffaney

- Canterbury Wizards won the toss and decided to field.
