= Ryan Watson (New Zealand cricketer) =

New Zealand cricketer

Personal information
- Full name: Ryan John Watson
- Born: 29 September 1994 (age 32)
- Batting: Right-handed
- Bowling: Right-arm medium
- Role: Bowler

Domestic team information
- Years: Team
- 2019/20: Central Districts
- Source: Cricinfo, 24 March 2022

Ryan John Watson (born 29 September 1994) is a New Zealand cricketer. He made his List A debut on 17 November 2019, for Central Districts in the 2019–20 Ford Trophy. He made his Twenty20 debut on 13 December 2019, for Central Districts in the 2019–20 Super Smash.
