= List of international cricket five-wicket hauls by Trent Boult =

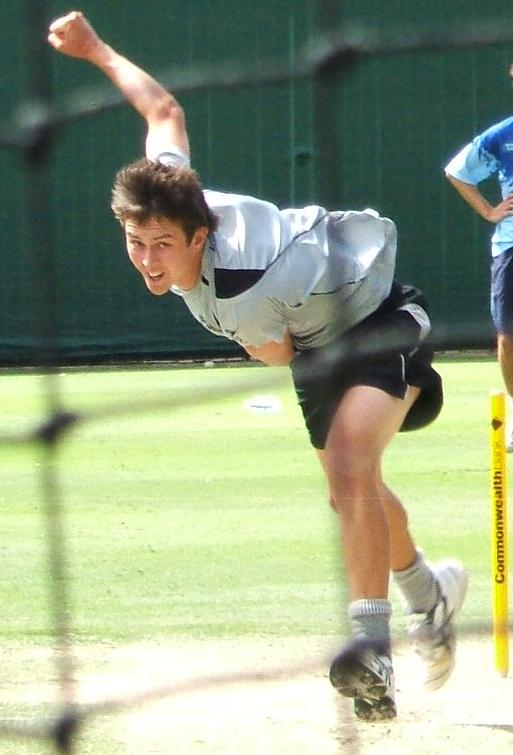
Boult has taken the fourth-highest number of five-wicket hauls for New Zealand.

In cricket, a five-wicket haul (also known as a fifer or five-for), refers to a bowler taking five or more wickets in a single innings. Trent Boult, a New Zealand cricketer, has taken 15 five-wicket hauls during his international cricket, ten in Test cricket and five in One Day International matches (ODIs). Boult has also played for New Zealand in Twenty20 International (T20I) cricket.

Boult is a left-arm fast-medium bowler, who is notable for his ability to swing the ball both ways. He is one of 36 players to have taken 300 or more wickets in Test cricket and has been ranked consistently towards the top of the ICC Men's ODI Player Rankings. He made his international debut for New Zealand on 9 December 2011 against Australia in the second Test of New Zealand's 2011 tour of Australia, taking four wickets in the match.

Boult's first five-wicket haul was against England, during the third Test of England's 2012–13 tour of New Zealand; he took six wickets for the cost of 68 runs (6/68) during England's first innings. His career best Test match bowling analysis came against Sri Lanka with 6/30 taken during Sri Lanka's 2018–2019 tour of New Zealand.

Boult's first ODI five-wicket haul was taken against Australia, during the 2015 Cricket World Cup. He took five wickets for 27 runs in a group stage match. With five individual five-wicket hauls, Boult is equal for eighth place for the most five-wickets taken in an ODI. His seven wickets for 34 against the West Indies are the eighth best figures taken in men's ODI cricket and the second best taken for New Zealand after Tim Southee's 7/33.

== Test match five-wicket hauls ==
Boult has taken five-wickets in an innings in a Test match ten times.

As of 8 October 2022

Five-wicket hauls in Test cricket by Trent Boult
No.	Date	Ground	Opponents	Inn	Overs	Runs	Wkts	Result	Refs
1	22 March 2013	Eden Park, Auckland	England	2	25	68	6	Drawn	
2	24 May 2013	Headingley Cricket Ground, Leeds	England	1	22	57	5	Lost	
3	11 December 2013 (Note: Boult took ten wickets during this match, with 4/40 taken during West Indies' second innings.) (Note: Boult was chosen as the Player of the Match.)	Basin Reserve, Wellington	West Indies	2	15	40	6	Won	
4	21 May 2015	Lord's Cricket Ground, London	England	3	34	85	5	Lost	
5	27 November 2015	Adelaide Oval, Adelaide	Australia	4	16	60	5	Lost	
6	22 March 2018	Eden Park, Auckland	England	1	10.4	32	6	Won	
7	26 December 2018	Hagley Oval, Christchurch	Sri Lanka	2	15	30	6	Won	
8	28 February 2019	Seddon Park, Hamilton	Bangladesh	3	28	123	5	Won	
9	9 January 2022	Hagley Oval, Christchurch	Bangladesh	2	13.2	43	5	Won	
10	10 June 2022	Trent Bridge, Nottingham	England	2	33.3	106	5	Lost	

== One Day International five-wicket hauls ==
Boult has taken five-wicket hauls in five One Day International matches.

As of 8 October 2022

Five-wicket hauls in ODIs by Trent Boult
No.	Date	Ground	Opponents	Inn	Overs	Runs	Wkts	Result	Refs
1	28 February 2015	Eden Park, Auckland	Australia	1	10	27	5	Won	
2	5 February 2017	Seddon Park, Hamilton	Australia	1	10	33	6	Won	
3	23 December 2017	Hagley Oval, Christchurch	West Indies	2	10	34	7	Won	
4	13 January 2018	University Oval, Dunedin	Pakistan	2	7.2	17	5	Won	
5	31 January 2019	Seddon Park, Hamilton	India	1	10	21	5	Won	
6	13 September 2023	The Oval, London	England	1	9.1	51	5	Lost	
