= Carl Frauenstein =

New Zealand cricketer (born 1985)

Personal information
- Born: 23 October 1985 (age 41); Stutterheim, Cape Province, South Africa
- Batting: Right-handed
- Bowling: Right-arm medium-fast

Domestic team information
- Years: Team
- 2006/07–2010/11: Canterbury

Career statistics
Competition	List A	Twenty20
Matches	21	35
Runs scored	176	188
Batting average	14.66	8.54
100s/50s	0/0	0/0
Top score	48	27
Balls bowled	682	476
Wickets	22	24
Bowling average	31.22	27.20
5 wickets in innings	0	0
10 wickets in match	0	0
Best bowling	4/48	3/20
Catches/stumpings	6/–	15/–
- Source: CricketArchive, 24 April 2023

Carl Frauenstein (born 23 October 1985) is a South African-born New Zealand cricketer who played for Canterbury. He was born at Stutterheim in 1985.
