= Ryan Burson =

New Zealand cricketer (born 1978)

Ryan David Burson (born 27 August 1978 in Christchurch) is a New Zealand cricketer who played for the Canterbury Wizards. He retired from cricket in 2011.
