= Trent Boult =

New Zealand cricketer (born 1989)

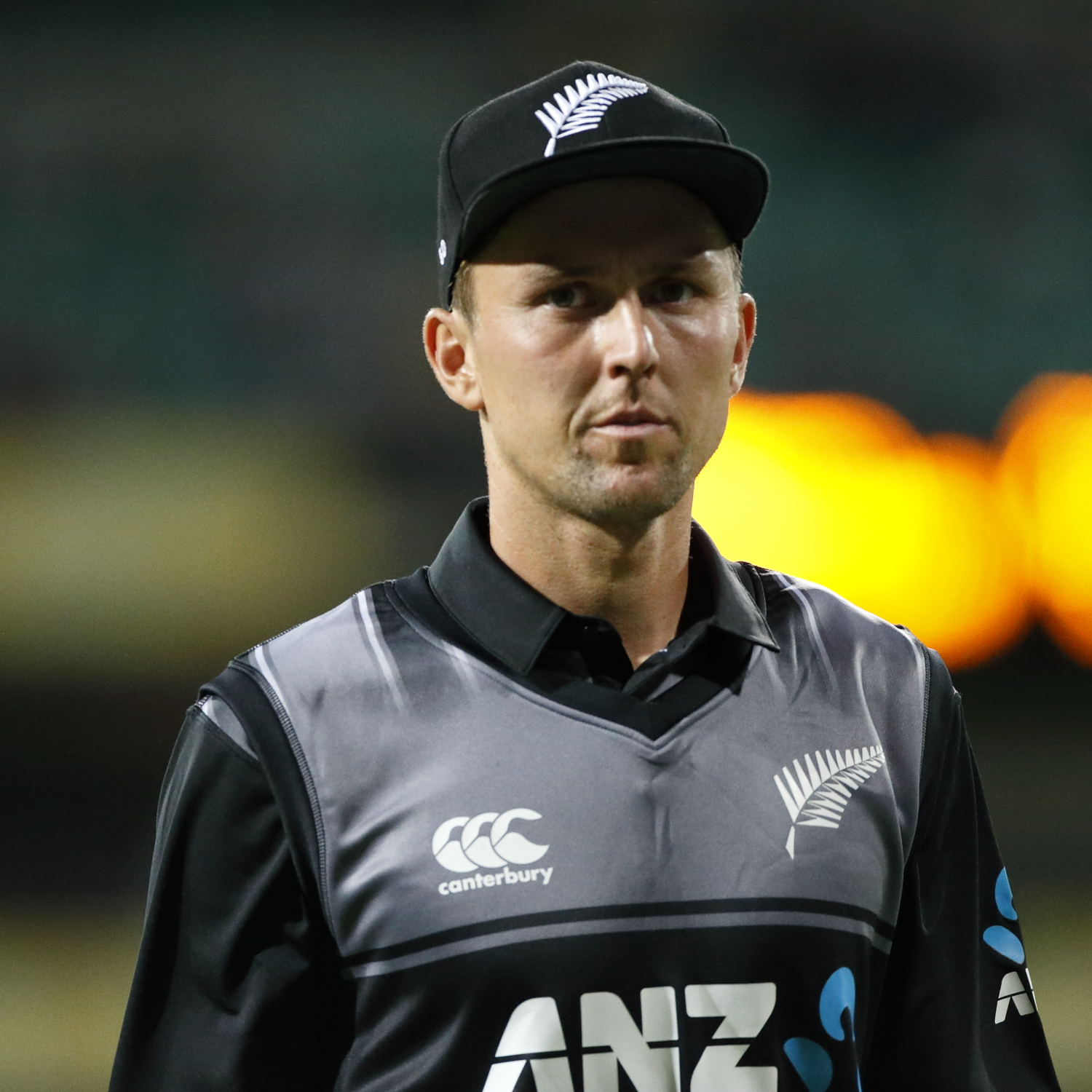
- Boult in 2018

Personal information
- Full name: Trent Alexander Boult
- Born: 22 July 1989 (age 37); Rotorua, New Zealand
- Batting: Right-handed
- Bowling: Left-arm fast-medium
- Role: Bowler
- Relatives: Jono Boult (brother)

International information
- National side: New Zealand (2011–2024)
- Test debut (cap 253): 9 December 2011 v Australia
- Last Test: 23 June 2022 v England
- ODI debut (cap 174): 11 July 2012 v West Indies
- Last ODI: 15 November 2023 v India
- ODI shirt no.: 18
- T20I debut (cap 60): 9 February 2013 v England
- Last T20I: 17 June 2024 v Papua New Guinea
- T20I shirt no.: 18

Domestic team information
- Years: Team
- 2008/09–2021/22: Northern Districts
- 2015–2016: Sunrisers Hyderabad
- 2017: Kolkata Knight Riders
- 2018–2019: Delhi Daredevils
- 2020–2021, 2025–present: Mumbai Indians
- 2022–2024: Rajasthan Royals
- 2022/23: Melbourne Stars
- 2023–2025: MI Emirates
- 2023–2025: MI New York
- 2024/25: MI Cape Town
- 2025: Birmingham Phoenix
- 2026: MI London
- 2026: Edinburgh Castle Rockers

Career statistics
| Competition | Test | ODI | T20I | FC |
|---|---|---|---|---|
| Matches | 78 | 114 | 61 | 113 |
| Runs scored | 759 | 216 | 58 | 1,212 |
| Batting average | 15.81 | 9.0 | 8.28 | 15.15 |
| 100s/50s | 0/1 | 0/0 | 0/0 | 0/2 |
| Top score | 52* | 21* | 16 | 61 |
| Balls bowled | 17,417 | 6,180 | 1,389 | 23,453 |
| Wickets | 317 | 211 | 83 | 433 |
| Bowling average | 27.49 | 24.38 | 21.43 | 26.86 |
| 5 wickets in innings | 10 | 6 | 0 | 18 |
| 10 wickets in match | 1 | 0 | 0 | 1 |
| Best bowling | 6/30 | 7/34 | 4/13 | 6/30 |
| Catches/stumpings | 43/– | 43/– | 22/– | 59/– |
Medal record
Men's Cricket
Representing New Zealand
ICC Cricket World Cup
| Runner-up | 2015 Australia and New Zealand |
| Runner-up | 2019 England and Wales |
ICC World Test Championship
| Winner | 2019–2021 |
ICC T20 World Cup
| Runner-up | 2021 UAE and Oman |
- Source: ESPNcricinfo, 19 June 2024

Trent Alexander Boult (born 22 July 1989) is a New Zealand cricketer who represented the New Zealand cricket team in all formats between 2011 and 2024. He continues to play in various Twenty20 leagues around the globe as a fast bowler. Boult was a key member of the New Zealand team that won the 2019–2021 ICC World Test Championship. He was also a part of the New Zealand squads to finish as runners-up in two Cricket World Cup finals in 2015 and 2019.

He is a left-arm fast-medium bowler and a right-handed batsman, Boult made his Test debut for New Zealand in December 2011 and his One Day International debut the following July. He was the joint leading wicket taker at the 2015 Cricket World Cup. In November 2018, he became the third bowler for New Zealand to take a hat-trick in ODIs, while in June 2019, Boult became the first bowler for New Zealand to take a hat-trick in the Cricket World Cup.

== Early life and family ==
Boult was born in Rotorua in 1989. He grew up in Ōhope and Tauranga, and was educated at Otumoetai College. He is the younger brother of cricketer Jono Boult. Of Māori descent, Boult affiliates to the Ngāi Tahu, Ngāti Porou and Ngāi Te Rangi iwi.

Trent announced his engagement to partner Gert Smith in June 2016, and the couple married in August 2017 in a private ceremony at Kauri Bay Boomrock. They have three sons, and live in Mount Maunganui.

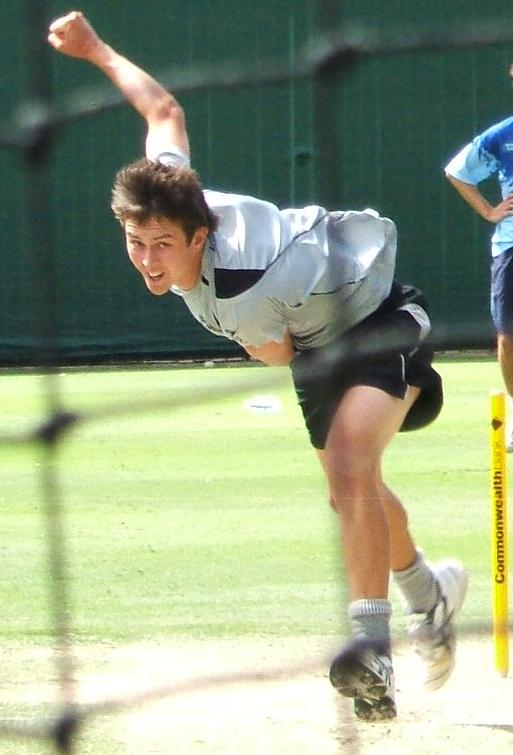
Boult in the nets at the Adelaide Oval

== Cricket career ==
=== Domestic and T20 franchise career ===
In 2015, Boult was New Zealand's leading wicket taker at the 2015 ICC Cricket World Cup. Following the tournament, Boult received a Maiden call-up into the Indian Premier League by the Sunrisers Hyderabad and he was purchased for $600,000.

In February 2017, he was bought by the Kolkata Knight Riders team for the 2017 Indian Premier League for 5 crores.

He also played for Delhi Capitals from 2018 to 2019 in the IPL.

In June 2019, he was selected to play for the Toronto Nationals franchise team in the 2019 Global T20 Canada tournament.

Boult was traded by Delhi to the Mumbai Indians prior to the thirteenth season of the IPL. He played a critical role in Mumbai winning the 2020 IPL title. He was the man of the match in the final and was also named the player of the season. Boult claimed 25 wickets in that edition of the IPL and was the third highest wicket taker after Kagiso Rabada and Jasprit Bumrah. He also bowled 4 maiden overs, the most by any player in a single season of IPL. His best bowling figures in the IPL are 4/18 against Chennai Super Kings (on 23 October 2020).

In the 2022 IPL auction, Boult was bought by the Rajasthan Royals.

On 2024 November, he was bought by Mumbai Indians in the 2025 IPL player-auctions. He was the highest wicket taker for MI in 2025.

=== International career ===
Boult accompanied the New Zealand A team on their winter training tour in 2007. On 9 February 2007, he took two wickets for 28 runs and scored seven not out against India's Under-19 team. He then travelled to Malaysia in February 2008 for the Under-19 World Cup.

On 21 January 2009, Boult was selected for the New Zealand squad for the one-day series against Australia at just 19 years of age. Boult only managed to play in the warm up game against the Prime Minister's XI and went wicketless off seven overs. During the tour Boult was clocked as the fastest bowler touring with the New Zealand team with a highest speed of 143.3 km/h (89.0 mph).

Boult made his Test debut in the 2011–12 season, in the Second Test against Australia in Hobart, in a match won by New Zealand by 7 runs, New Zealand's first test win in Australia since 1985 and their first test win over Australia since 1993. He took four wickets in the match; additionally, he scored 21 runs in a tenth-wicket partnership with Chris Martin in the second innings.

In 2012, Boult produced a string of strong performances with the ball against the West Indies, India and Sri Lanka to consolidate his position as Tim Southee's new ball partner. He carried this good form into 2013 when he took 19 wickets in 5 tests against England, including his best test match innings bowling figures of 6/68 at Eden Park in March.

After suffering a side strain during New Zealand's final Test match against England at Leeds, Boult returned to the New Zealand Test team for a two test tour of Bangladesh. Boult struggled in the hot and dry conditions, taking just 3 wickets and frequently straying with his accuracy. However, when back in home conditions against the touring West Indies, Boult swiftly returned to his best. In the second test at the Basin Reserve Boult won man of the match award, after taking career best figures of 10 for 80 and completing a brilliant one-handed diving catch to his left to dismiss Denesh Ramdin. In the first innings of the second test on the same venue against India, Boult made another one-handed diving right-handed catch to dismiss Ajinkya Rahane. He also had bowling figures of 4 for 146.

In 2014 T20 series against West Indies, Boult's squad number switched from 8 to 18, a number previously worn by Mathew Sinclair.

In the Trans-Tasman trophy 2015–16 series, in Australia, in the third Test, the first ever day-night test in history, Boult became the first New Zealander and second overall after Josh Hazlewood, to take a five-wicket haul in a day-night test. However, Australia won the day-night match by 3 wickets. He was named in the 'Team of the Tournament' for the 2015 World Cup by the ICC.

In 2018, Boult produced his best figures in Test cricket, taking 6/32 in the First Test against England in Auckland. England were bowled out for 58 in their first innings and New Zealand went on to win the Test by an innings and 49 runs. New Zealand went on the win series 1–0; Boult finished with 15 wickets at an average of 18.33 and was named man of the series. At the NZC Annual Awards, he received the Men's Test Player of the Year and the Sir Richard Hadlee Medal for best International player of the year. In May that year, Boult was one of twenty players to be awarded a new contract for the 2018–19 season by New Zealand Cricket.

In the fourth ODI of India's 2018–19 New Zealand tour, Boult claimed his fifth five-wicket haul, the joint-most for a New Zealand bowler alongside Richard Hadlee. He returned figures of 5/21 helping his team dismiss India for their lowest total in ODIs since 2010. New Zealand went on record one of their biggest wins and Boult was named man of the match.

In April 2019, he was named in New Zealand's squad for the 2019 Cricket World Cup. On 5 June 2019, in the match against Bangladesh, Boult took his 150th wicket in ODIs. On 29 June 2019, in the match against Australia, Boult took the second hat-trick of the World Cup. He was the first bowler for New Zealand to take a hat-trick at the Cricket World Cup. In August 2021, Boult was named in New Zealand's squad for the 2021 ICC Men's T20 World Cup. He helped his team reach the finals, taking 13 wickets for New Zealand, the highest for his team.

In January 2022, in the second match against Bangladesh, Boult took his 300th wicket in Test cricket.

In May 2024, he was named in New Zealand's squad for the 2024 ICC Men's T20 World Cup tournament. He retired from international cricket after New Zealand was knocked out in the group stage of the tournament.

== Bowling and fielding style ==
Boult is a left-arm fast-medium swing bowler who makes up for his relative lack of height with deceptive pace of approximately 140 km/h and ability to swing the ball both ways with different variations. Boult's primary weapon is an inswinger to a right-handed batsman. Unsurprisingly, his childhood cricketing hero is Wasim Akram. In 2013, in a radio interview, the former New Zealand captain Jeremy Coney rated Boult as New Zealand's best bowling discovery since Shane Bond. He is also known to haul in one-handed catches with either hand. In 2014, he became the 4th test bowler since Richard Hadlee, Chris Martin and Iain O'Brien to claim 30+ wickets in consecutive years. He has developed a good opening bowling partnership with Tim Southee, having taken 46% of all wickets between them since 2013, especially since the retirement of Martin. In Tests, they are ably complemented by Neil Wagner's short left-arm seam deliveries. In August 2019, in the series against Sri Lanka, Boult became the third bowler for New Zealand to take 250 wickets in Test cricket.

== See also ==
List of international cricket five-wicket hauls by Trent Boult
