= Ronnie Hira =

New Zealand cricketer

Personal information
- Born: 23 January 1987 (age 39); Auckland, New Zealand
- Batting: Left-handed
- Bowling: Slow left-arm orthodox
- Role: Bowler

International information
- National side: New Zealand (2012–2013)
- T20I debut (cap 53): 11 February 2012 v Zimbabwe
- Last T20I: 27 June 2013 v England

Domestic team information
- Years: Team
- 2006/07–2011/12: Auckland
- 2012/13–2015/16: Canterbury
- 2016/17: Northern Districts
- 2017/18–2019/20: Auckland

Career statistics
Competition	T20I	FC	LA	T20
Matches	15	20	93	128
Runs scored	37	822	779	918
Batting average	18.50	25.68	17.70	19.53
100s/50s	0/0	1/5	0/1	0/3
Top score	20*	100	70*	91*
Balls bowled	254	880	3,867	2,488
Wickets	10	6	70	130
Bowling average	33.70	82.33	46.02	23.19
5 wickets in innings	0	0	0	0
10 wickets in match	0	0	0	0
Best bowling	2/42	3/85	4/31	4/13
Catches/stumpings	2/–	10/–	37/–	48/–
- Source: Cricinfo, 15 August 2022

Roneel Magan Hira (born 23 January 1987) is a New Zealand Twenty20 International cricketer who is a left-arm off spinner. His relaxed attitude to cricket and his bowling style have been compared to Phil Tufnell. He was born in Auckland.

== Domestic career ==
Hira made his debut for Auckland in first-class, List A and Twenty20 matches in the 2006–07 season. He represented New Zealand in the 2006 Under-19 Cricket World Cup in Sri Lanka. He last played a first-class game in March 2008, but has represented Auckland with more regularity in the limited-overs formats. Hira was a part of the Auckland 50-over and Twenty20 sides that won the New Zealand domestic titles in 2010–11. He subsequently travelled to India with the Auckland Aces as part of their unsuccessful campaign in the Champions League Twenty20, an international Twenty20 cricket competition between club teams from India, Australia, England, South Africa, Sri Lanka, New Zealand and West Indies.

After three seasons as a contracted player for the Auckland Aces, Hira's domestic contract was not renewed for the 2011–12 season. Despite only receiving match payments, Hira was the bowling standout of the domestic Twenty20 competition in the 2011–12 season and was an integral part of Auckland's successful defence of the HRV Twenty20 Cup. In an impressive campaign, he took 14 wickets at an average of 14.85 and, most importantly given the high-scoring Twenty20 format, conceded only 5.85 runs an over.

Hira finished the Twenty-20 competition as the joint leading wicket-taker and impressed with his sharp fielding and his batting cameos lower down the order. On the back of this performance, Hira was the winner of the HRV Cup MVP bowling rankings. His 76.06 MVP bowling points placed him well clear of the Canterbury Wizards' Rob Nicol who was second with 54.27; he got the HRV Cup MVP award for 2014.

== International career ==
Hira was rewarded with selection in the New Zealand Twenty-20 squad for the 2012 series against Zimbabwe and South Africa.
