= Alecz Day =

New Zealand cricketer (born 1990)

Personal information
- Born: 1 April 1990 (age 36); Brisbane, Australia
- Source: Cricinfo, 30 October 2015

Alecz Day (born 1 April 1990) is a New Zealand first-class cricketer who plays for Wellington.

When training for Premier cricket on the Sunshine Coast in Queensland, Australia, in January 2020, he suffered a cardiac arrest, but was fortunate to have been successfully resuscitated by teammates.
