= Jono Boult =

New Zealand cricketer (born 1985)

Personal information
- Full name: Jonathon James Boult
- Born: 29 November 1985 (age 40); Rotorua, New Zealand
- Batting: Left-handed
- Bowling: Right-arm medium-fast
- Relatives: Trent Boult (brother)

Domestic team information
- Years: Team
- 2008/09–2016/17: Northern Districts

Career statistics
Competition	FC	LA	T20
Matches	21	38	47
Runs scored	508	396	79
Batting average	20.32	19.80	6.07
100s/50s	0/2	0/1	0/0
Top score	76	52	25*
Balls bowled	3,580	1,737	906
Wickets	39	43	43
Bowling average	49.12	36.37	25.20
5 wickets in innings	0	0	0
10 wickets in match	0	0	0
Best bowling	4/37	3/28	4/23
Catches/stumpings	7/–	9/–	6/–
- Source: Cricinfo, 30 November 2018

Jonathon James Boult (born 29 November 1985) is a former New Zealand cricketer who played for Northern Districts from 2009 to 2017.

Boult made his first-class cricket debut for Northern Districts against Auckland in March 2009. He was named as twelfth man for New Zealand's first Test against India later that month.

His younger brother, Trent Boult, plays for New Zealand and Northern Districts.
