= Saxton Oval =

New Zealand Cricket ground

Coordinates: 41°19′51″S 173°12′46″E

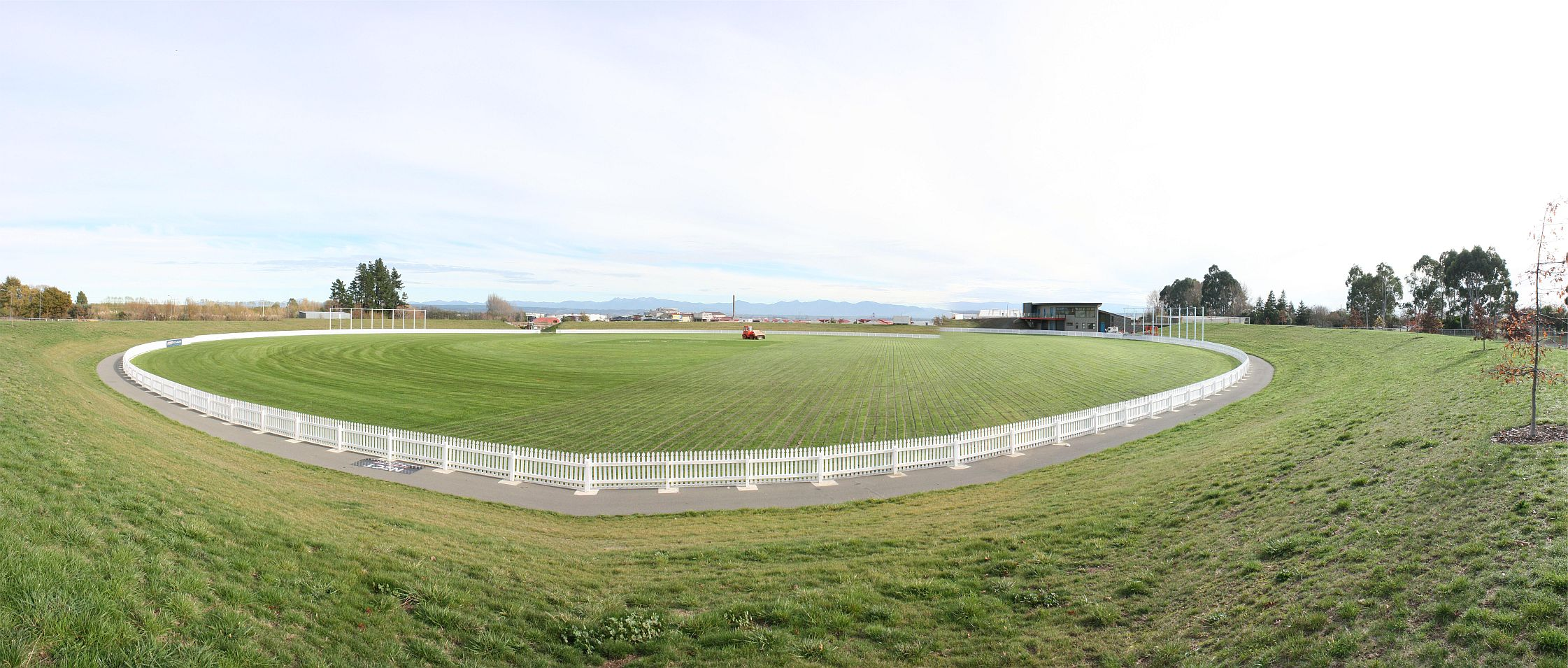
- Saxton Oval 2010

Ground information
- Location: Nelson, New Zealand
- Country: New Zealand
- Establishment: 2009
- Capacity: 6,000
- End names
- Town End; Richmond End

International information
- First ODI: 4 January 2014: New Zealand v West Indies
- Last ODI: 20 December 2023: New Zealand v Bangladesh
- First T20I: 29 December 2017: New Zealand v West Indies
- Last T20I: 2 January 2025: New Zealand v Sri Lanka
- First WODI: 17 November 2016: New Zealand v Pakistan
- Last WODI: 19 November 2016: New Zealand v Pakistan
- First WT20I: 30 December 2010: New Zealand v Australia
- Last WT20I: 24 March 2024: New Zealand v England

Team information
Central Districts	(2010–present)
New Zealand National Team	(2014–present)
- As of 24 March 2024; Source: Cricinfo

Saxton Oval, also known as Saxton Field, is a cricket ground in Saxton, Stoke, Nelson Region, New Zealand. Saxton Oval was one of the venues for the 2015 Cricket World Cup. It hosted three matches during the tournament.

== History ==
The ground was constructed by the Nelson Cricket Association following their move from Trafalgar Park, at a cost of $3.8 million. The Oval is part of a wider sports complex which also offers athletics, association football, field hockey and softball facilities.

The ground was first used by Central Districts in a Twenty20 match in the 2009–10 HRV Cup against Canterbury. Three further Twenty20 matches were played there in that competition. The ground held its first List A and first-class matches in the 2011-12 Ford Trophy and the 2011-12 Plunket Shield. A single Women's Twenty20 International was played there in December 2010 between New Zealand Women and Australia Women.

The cricket oval was used as a base during the 2011 Rugby Union World Cup by the national teams of Italy and Australia.

Saxton Oval was one of the venues for the 2015 Cricket World Cup.

On 4 January 2014, Nelson hosted its first men's one day international match when West Indies played New Zealand.

On 29 December 2017, Nelson hosted its first men's T20 international match when West Indies played New Zealand.

== International centuries ==
The following centuries have been achieved at the ground.

=== ODIs ===
No.	Score	Player	Team	Balls	Opposing Team	Date	Result
1	103	Kane Williamson	New Zealand	107	Sri Lanka	20 January 2015	Won
2	102	Lendl Simmons	West Indies	84	Ireland	16 February 2015	Lost
3	156	Kyle Coetzer	Scotland	134	Bangladesh	5 March 2015	Lost
4	109*	Neil Broom	New Zealand	107	Bangladesh	29 December 2016	Won
5	137	Ross Taylor	New Zealand	131	Sri Lanka	8 January 2019	Won
6	124*	Henry Nicholls	New Zealand	80	Sri Lanka	8 January 2019	Won
7	169	Soumya Sarkar	Bangladesh	151	New Zealand	20 December 2023	Lost

=== T20Is ===
No.	Score	Player	Team	Balls	Opposing Team	Date	Result
1	101	Kusal Perera	Sri Lanka	46	New Zealand	2 January 2025	Won
