= Super Smash (men's cricket) =

Professional twenty20 cricket league in New Zealand

- Countries: New Zealand
- Administrator: New Zealand Cricket
- Format: Twenty20
- First edition: 2005–06
- Latest edition: 2025–26
- Tournament format: Double round-robin, elimination final and final
- Number of teams: 6
- Current champion: Northern Brave (5th title)
- Most successful: Auckland Aces; Northern Brave (5 titles)
- TV: TVNZ (New Zealand); Fox Cricket (Australia); ESPN+ (US)
- Website: Super Smash
- 2026–27

The Super Smash is a men's domestic Twenty20 cricket competition in New Zealand. Since the 2018–19 season, the competition runs alongside the Women's Super Smash.

== History ==
The tournament consists of a double round-robin, with the top three teams qualifying for the play-offs.

The competition has been held every year since 2005 and its former names include:

- New Zealand Twenty20 Competition – 2005–06
- State Twenty20 – from 2006–07 to 2008–09
- HRV Cup – from 2009–10 to 2012–13
- HRV Twenty20 – 2013–14

Since the 2014–15 season, the competition has been known as the Super Smash with many different sponsors exercising their own naming rights:

- Georgie Pie – from 2014–15 to 2015–16
- McDonald's – 2016–17
- Burger King – from 2017–18 to 2018–19
- Dream11 – from 2019–20 to 2024–25

From 2008–09 to 2013–14 the winner of the competition gained entry to the Champions League Twenty20 tournament later in the same year.

== Teams ==
Location of teams in Super Smash

Six teams play in the league, four from the North Island and two from the South Island.

Team	Major Association	District Associations	Wins	2nds
Auckland Aces	Auckland	–	5	4
Canterbury Kings	Canterbury	Christchurch Metro, Christchurch Junior, Canterbury Country, South Canterbury, Buller, Mid Canterbury, West Coast	1	8
Central Stags	Central Districts	Hawke's Bay, Taranaki, Wanganui, Manawatu, Horowhenua-Kapiti, Wairarapa, Marlborough, Nelson	4	3
Northern Brave	Northern Districts	Northland, Counties Manukau, Hamilton, Waikato Valley; Bay of Plenty, Poverty Bay	5	2
Otago Volts	Otago	Dunedin, Southland, Otago Country, North Otago	2	3
Wellington Firebirds	Wellington	–	4	1

== Tournament results ==
Results of each season are here:

Tournament	Final				Format	Matches
Tournament	Final venue	Winner	Result	Runner-up	Format	Matches
2005–06; Fixtures	Eden Park Outer Oval, Auckland	Canterbury Wizards; 180 for 4 (17.2 overs)	won by 6 wickets Scorecard	Auckland Aces; 179 for 7 (20 overs)	Two groups; Single round-robin; Final	7
2006–07; Fixtures	Eden Park Outer Oval, Auckland	Auckland Aces; 211 for 5 (20 overs)	won by 60 runs Scorecard	Otago Volts; 151 all out (20 overs)	Single round-robin; Final between top two teams	16
2007–08; Fixtures	Pukekura Park, New Plymouth	Central Stags; 150 for 5 (16.3 overs)	won by 5 wickets Scorecard	Northern Knights; 148 for 8 (20 overs)	Single round-robin; Final between top two teams	16
2008–09; Fixtures	University Oval, Dunedin	Otago Volts	won by topping group stage (final abandoned due to rain); Scorecard	Canterbury Wizards	Group stage with eight matches per side; Final between top two teams	25
2009–10	Pukekura Park, New Plymouth	Central Stags; 206 for 6 (20 overs)	won by 78 runs Scorecard	Auckland Aces; 128 all out (16.1 overs)	Double round-robin; Final between top two teams	31
2010–11	Colin Maiden Park, Auckland	Auckland Aces; 158 for 8 (20 overs)	won by 4 runs Scorecard	Central Stags; 154 for 9 (20 overs)	Double round-robin; Final between top two teams	31
2011–12	Colin Maiden Park, Auckland	Auckland Aces; 196 for 5 (20 overs)	won by 44 runs Scorecard	Canterbury Wizards; 152 all out (18.3 overs)	Double round-robin; Final between top two teams	31
2012–13	University Oval, Dunedin	Otago Volts; 145 for 6 (18.3 overs)	won by 4 wickets Scorecard	Wellington Firebirds; 143 for 9 (20 overs)	Double round-robin, preliminary final and final	32
2013–14	Seddon Park, Hamilton	Northern Knights; 144 for 5 (19.0 overs)	won by 5 wickets Scorecard	Otago Volts; 143 for 5 (20 overs)	Double round-robin, preliminary final and final	32
2014–15	Seddon Park, Hamilton	Wellington Firebirds; 186 for 6 (20 overs)	won by 6 runs Scorecard	Auckland Aces; 180 for 9 (20 overs)	Double round-robin, 2 preliminary finals and final	33
2015–16	Yarrow Stadium, New Plymouth	Auckland Aces; 166 for 6 (20 overs)	won by 20 runs Scorecard	Otago Volts; 146 for 9 (20 overs)	Double round-robin, 2 preliminary finals and final	33
2016–17	Pukekura Park, New Plymouth	Wellington Firebirds; 172 for 7 (20 overs)	won by 14 runs Scorecard	Central Stags; 158 for 8 (20 overs)	Double round-robin, elimination final and final	32
2017–18	Seddon Park, Hamilton	Northern Knights; 103 for 1 (8.5 overs)	won by 9 wickets Scorecard	Central Stags; 99 for 8 (20 overs)	Double round-robin, elimination final and final	32
2018–19	Seddon Park, Hamilton	Central Stags; 147/8 (20 overs)	won by 67 runs Scorecard	Northern Knights; 80 (14.4 overs)	Double round-robin, elimination final and final	32
2019–20	Basin Reserve, Wellington	Wellington Firebirds; 168/7 (20 overs)	won by 22 runs Scorecard	Auckland Aces; 146/9 (20 overs)	Double round-robin, elimination final and final	32
2020–21	Basin Reserve, Wellington	Wellington Firebirds; 178/5 (19.4 overs)	won by 5 wickets Scorecard	Canterbury Kings; 175/8 (20 overs)	Double round-robin, elimination final and final	32
2021–22	Seddon Park, Hamilton	Northern Brave; 217/5 (20 overs)	won by 56 runs Scorecard	Canterbury Kings; 161 (18.5 overs)	Double round-robin, elimination final and final	32
2022–23	Hagley Oval, Christchurch	Northern Brave; 156/3 (18 overs)	won by 7 wickets Scorecard	Canterbury Kings; 154/6 (20 overs)	Double round-robin, elimination final and final	32
2023–24	Eden Park, Auckland	Auckland Aces Did not bat	won by topping group stage (final abandoned due to rain); Scorecard	Canterbury Kings 133 for 2 (14.2 overs)	Double round-robin, elimination final and final	32
2024–25	Basin Reserve, Wellington	Central Stags; 136/4 (17.2 overs)	won by 6 wickets Scorecard	Canterbury Kings; 135/8 (20 overs)	Double round-robin, elimination final and final	32
2025–26	Hagley Oval, Christchurch	Northern Brave; 173/5 (17.5 overs)	won by 6 wickets Scorecard	Canterbury Kings; 171/5 (20 overs)	Double round-robin, elimination final and final	32

- From 2008–09 until 2013–14, the winning team qualified for the Champions League Twenty20
- From the 2010–11 season onwards, each team is allowed up to two overseas players

== See also ==
- Super Smash (women's cricket)
- Plunket Shield
- Hallyburton Johnstone Shield
- The Ford Trophy
- Cricket in New Zealand
