= Robert Carter (cricketer, born 1960) =

English cricketer (born 1960)

Robert Michael Carter (born 25 May 1960 in King's Lynn, England) is a former cricketer who played 60 first-class and 55 List A matches between 1978 and 1985 for Northamptonshire and Canterbury.

He later worked as a coach, serving in roles within New Zealand cricket including being head coach of the New Zealand women's national cricket team from 2019 to 2022. He played a season as professional/coach for Kirkcaldy Cricket Club (now defunct) in Scotland in 1984, topping the averages with bat and ball and winning the Scottish East League First Division title that season.
