= Anton Devcich =

New Zealand cricketer (born 1985)

Personal information
- Full name: Anton Paul Devcich
- Born: 28 September 1985 (age 41); Hamilton, New Zealand
- Batting: Left-handed
- Bowling: Slow left arm orthodox

International information
- National side: New Zealand (2013–2016)
- ODI debut (cap 60): 29 October 2013 v Bangladesh
- Last ODI: 26 October 2016 v India
- T20I debut (cap 62): 6 November 2013 v Bangladesh
- Last T20I: 5 December 2014 v Pakistan

Domestic team information
- Years: Team
- 2004/05–2020/21: Northern Districts
- 2016: Trinbago Knight Riders
- 2018: Nangarhar Leopards
- 2018: St Kitts & Nevis Patriots
- 2018/19: Lahore Qalandars
- 2018/19: Sydney Thunder

Career statistics
Competition	ODI	T20I	FC	LA
Matches	12	4	56	101
Runs scored	195	111	2,826	2,665
Batting average	17.72	27.75	30.06	29.94
100s/50s	0/1	0/1	5/13	1/21
Top score	58	59	132	101*
Balls bowled	324	72	3,203	3,017
Wickets	4	2	51	53
Bowling average	72.75	40.00	37.33	52.20
5 wickets in innings	0	0	0	1
10 wickets in match	0	0	0	0
Best bowling	2/33	2/16	4/43	5/46
Catches/stumpings	3/–	2/–	34/–	37/–
- Source: Cricinfo, 26 August 2022

Anton Paul Devcich (born 28 September 1985) is a New Zealand former international cricketer, who played in limited over internationals. A left-handed batsman who occasionally bowls left-arm orthodox spin, at the domestic level he plays for Northern Districts.

== Career ==
=== Domestic cricket ===
Devcich made his first-class debut against Otago in 2005 for Northern Districts. Batting at 9, he scored 94 not out, including 15 boundaries, in the first innings, but he finished the match wicketless. He played three further first-class matches in the 2004–05 season but in five innings failed to pass 30.

He made List A and Twenty20 debuts the following season but has been unable to secure a first-team place with only sporadic appearances in all formats. In the 2017–18 Super Smash, he was the leading run-scorer, with 343 runs in ten matches.

In April 2018, he was named the Super Smash Player of the Year at the New Zealand Cricket Awards. In June 2018, he was awarded a contract with Northern Districts for the 2018–19 season.

He was the leading run-scorer for the Nangarhar Leopards in the 2018–19 Afghanistan Premier League, with 270 runs in nine matches. He was the leading wicket-taker for Northern Districts in the 2018–19 Ford Trophy, with twelve dismissals in seven matches.

In July 2019, he was selected to play for the Edinburgh Rocks in the inaugural edition of the Euro T20 Slam cricket tournament. However, the following month the tournament was cancelled. In January 2020, Devcich conceded 6 sixes in an over against Leo Carter of Canterbury, a moment he referred to as one of the worst of his cricketing career.

=== International Cricket ===
Devcich represented New Zealand at youth level, making five appearances at the Under-19 Cricket World Cup in 2004.

==== Black Caps ====
In September 2013, Devcich was named in the Black Caps limited-overs squad to tour Bangladesh. On 29 October he made his ODI debut in the first ODI of the series, and eight days later he hit 59 off just 31 deliveries in his T20 International debut.

Overall, Devcich played 12 ODIs and four T20 Internationals for New Zealand.

== Retirement ==
Devcich announced his retirement from representative cricket in July 2021.
