= Neil Broom =

New Zealand cricketer (born 1983)

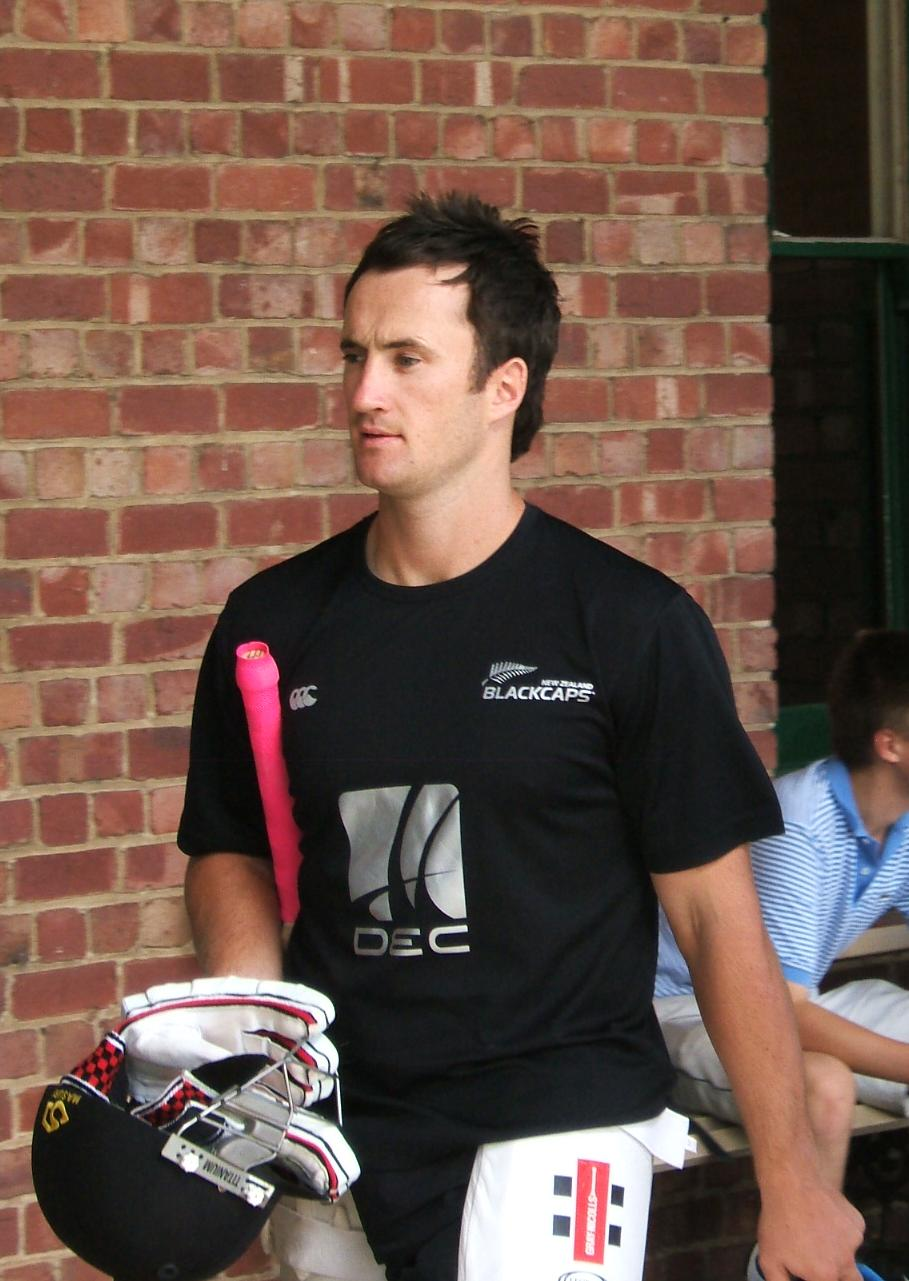

Personal information
- Full name: Neil Trevor Broom
- Born: 20 November 1983 (age 42); Christchurch, Canterbury, New Zealand
- Batting: Right-handed
- Bowling: Right-arm medium
- Role: Batsman
- Relatives: Darren Broom (brother)

International information
- National side: New Zealand
- Test debut (cap 272): 16 March 2017 v South Africa
- Last Test: 25 March 2017 v South Africa
- ODI debut (cap 151): 10 January 2009 v West Indies
- Last ODI: 26 December 2017 v West Indies
- ODI shirt no.: 4

Domestic team information
- Years: Team
- 2002/03–2004/05: Canterbury
- 2005/06–2013/14: Otago
- 2014/15: Canterbury
- 2015/16–2021/22: Otago
- 2016: Derbyshire

Career statistics
Competition	Test	ODI	FC	LA
Matches	2	39	149	190
Runs scored	32	943	8,457	6,030
Batting average	10.66	26.94	37.42	37.92
100s/50s	0/0	1/5	18/33	10/39
Top score	20	109*	203*	164
Balls bowled	–	–	792	388
Wickets	–	–	8	6
Bowling average	–	–	65.62	65.33
5 wickets in innings	–	–	0	0
10 wickets in match	–	–	0	0
Best bowling	–	–	1/8	2/59
Catches/stumpings	0/–	9/–	107/–	62/–
- Source: CricketArchive, 12 May 2022

Neil Trevor Broom (born 20 November 1983) is a New Zealand former international cricketer. He played domestic cricket for Otago and Canterbury and in England for Derbyshire County Cricket Club. After making his One Day International debut in 2009, Broom was recalled to the squad in 2017 following a successful domestic season, and made his Test debut. He played two Test matches, 39 One Day Internationals and 11 Twenty20 Internationals for the national side.

Broom was born at Christchurch in Canterbury in 1983. He was educated at Shirley Boys' High School. He retired from professional cricket at the end of the 2021–22 season, and in July 2022 was appointed coach of University Grange Cricket Club in the Dunedin Premier Grade competition (2022–23). His brother, Darren Broom, played for Canterbury and Otago between 2007–08 and 2012–13.

== Domestic career ==
Broom played in a strong Canterbury side in the early years of his professional career, making his top-class debut in the 2002–03 season. With limited opportunities in the representative side, he moved to play for Otago from the 2005–06 season. He established himself as a core element of the Otago side and played almost 350 senior matches for the provincial side, although he returned to Canterbury for one season in 2014–15.

In September 2015 Broom signed a two-year deal with English domestic side Derbyshire County Cricket Club. He held a British passport and qualified as a domestic player. He played a total of 32 matches for the side in all competitions during the 2016 season. In December 2016, however, he cancelled his contract with the team after a surprise recall to the New Zealand side.

When he retired from cricket in 2022 he was Otago's leading run scorer in both List A and Twenty20 cricket, and the province's second leading run scorer in first-class cricket, with 6,085 runs for the team. He had made 101 first-class appearances for the side, the second most of any player. He also held two partnership records for the side, putting on 306 runs with Shaun Haig for the third wicket in 2009–10 and 239 runs with Nick Beard for the fourth wicket in 2012–12.

== International career ==
Broom was first selected in the New Zealand squad for the One Day International series against the West Indies in 2008–09. He made his debut in the fourth match at Auckland in January 2009, scoring 24 not out and kept his place for the final match of the series. He played against Australia in February 2009 and made his Twenty20 International debut during the tour. He was a regular in the New Zealand team until the end of the 2009–10 season.

A single Twenty20 International against Sri Lanka was the only international cricket Broom played until he was named in the squad for the ODI series against Bangladesh in 2016–17, replacing Ross Taylor in the side after he was not passed fit after recovering from an eye surgery. He had to terminate his contract with Derbyshire in order to play again for New Zealand. Broom scored his maiden ODI century against Bangladesh during the second ODI of the series, batting with Kane Williamson in a partnership of 176 for the second wicket, setting a new record second wicket partnership for New Zealand in ODIs. He went on to score 97 in the third ODI and was added to New Zealand's T20I squad, after Martin Guptill was ruled out due to injury. The single match he played during the T20I series was his last for New Zealand.

In March 2017, he was included in New Zealand's Test squad against South Africa as a replacement for injured Ross Taylor. He made his Test debut for New Zealand against South Africa on 16 March 2017 in the second Test of the series and retained his place in the side for the final Test, although he scored only 32 runs with a high score of 20 in his two Test matches. He retained his place in the ODI side throughout 2017, including playing in the 2017 Champions Trophy. His final international appearances came at the end of the year against the touring West Indians. Both of his final ODIs were at the Hagley Oval in his hometown to Christchurch.
