= Auckland cricket team =

Cricket team in New Zealand

Auckland
- One Day name: Auckland Aces

Personnel
- Captain: Robert O'Donnell
- Coach: Rob Nicol

Team information
- Colours: AA
- Founded: 1873
- Home ground: Eden Park Outer Oval
- Capacity: 4,000

History
- First-class debut: Canterbury in 1873 at Christchurch
- Plunket Shield wins: 23
- The Ford Trophy wins: 12
- Men's Super Smash wins: 5
- Official website: www.aucklandcricket.co.nz

The Auckland cricket team represent the Auckland region and are one of six New Zealand domestic first class cricket teams. Governed by the Auckland Cricket Association they are the most successful team having won 28 Plunket Shield titles, ten wins in The Ford Trophy and the Super Smash four times. The team currently play their home games at Eden Park Outer Oval.

The limited overs team, known as the Auckland Aces, have a predominantly light blue kit with a navy and white trim. Their One Day Championship shirt sponsors are Ford whilst their major T20 sponsor is Mondiale.

They won the Men's Super Smash competition in the 2015–16 season, their 4th domestic Twenty20 title overall, making them become the most successful team in New Zealand.

== Honours ==
Plunket Shield (24) 1907–08*, 1908–09*, 1909–10*, 1911–12*, 1919–20*, 1921–22, 1926–27, 1928–29, 1933–34, 1936–37, 1937–38, 1938–39, 1939–40, 1946–47, 1958–59, 1963–64, 1968–69, 1977–78, 1980–81, 1988–89, 1990–91, 1994–95, 1995–96, 2001–02, 2002–03, 2004–05, 2008–09, 2015/16, 2021–22

* Wins in the Plunket Shield in these seasons were during its challenge match period.

The Ford Trophy (12) 1972–73, 1978–79, 1980–81, 1982–83, 1983–84, 1986–87, 1989–90, 2006–07, 2010–11, 2012–13, 2017–18, 2019–20

Men's Super Smash (4) 2006–07, 2010–11, 2011–12, 2015–16, 2023–24

== History of Auckland cricket ==
=== Overview ===
The Auckland Cricket Association is the most successful major association in New Zealand cricket history. Auckland have won the Plunket Shield 28 times, including a four-year winning streak between 1936 and 1940. The large population base that Auckland have to pick from has contributed to the team's success and produced a large number of the national team's players. Since the introduction of List A cricket in the 1970s, Auckland have won twelve one-day competitions with the most recent in the 2021/22 season.

=== Early years ===
Auckland were the first New Zealand team to visit another province, travelling to Wellington to play Wellington in a one-day match in March 1860, which Auckland won. The Auckland Cricket Association was founded in 1873. Auckland played their first first-class game against Canterbury the same year. They were the third major association founded in New Zealand after Canterbury and Otago, and just before Wellington. The match against Canterbury was part of the first tour undertaken by a New Zealand provincial team, when over three weeks in November and December 1873 Auckland played in Dunedin, Christchurch, Wellington and Nelson, winning all four matches.

It was not until 1906-07 that the team first competed in structured competition after the donation of the Plunket Shield by the then Governor-General, William Plunket. In the first season of the challenge competition, in 1907–08, Auckland defeated Canterbury to win their first title. They held the Plunket Shield several times between 1908 and 1921, when the competition was changed to a round-robin format.

=== 'Golden years' ===
The 1920s and 1930s are often known as the golden years of Auckland cricket. The team won seven Plunket Shield titles, four of them in consecutive years. As well as local success in the 1920s Auckland produced some of the early greats of New Zealand cricket such as Jack Mills and Ces Dacre.

The region kept producing high-calibre players in the 1930s like Merv Wallace, Paul Whitelaw, Bill Carson and Jack Cowie. Whitelaw and Carson also secured themselves a personal honour with a then world record partnership for the third wicket against Canterbury (this record is now held by Kumar Sangakkara and Mahela Jayawardene). Auckland cricket was developing fast and producing a number of world-renowned players, but World War II saw the Plunket Shield suspended and many promising cricketers shipped overseas. A number of these players died whilst serving the armed services overseas including double All Black Bill Carson.

=== After the War ===
After Auckland won the Plunket Shield in 1947, the competition became more even, with Otago and Wellington dominating the next decade of competition. Also in the 1950s Central Districts and Northern Districts entered the competition.

This period is not known for the success of Auckland, but for the astonishing performances of individuals. In a 1951 game against Canterbury, Merv Wallace remarkably steered the team to victory under extreme circumstances. Wallace broke a bone whilst fielding in Canterbury's first innings and came in at number nine in the batting order. He smashed 60 as he led the tail in a remarkable fightback that saw Auckland gain first innings by one run. If not impressive enough Wallace also pulled a calf muscle when on 26 going for a hook shot. In the second innings Auckland required six runs with six wickets in hand. Wallace did not expect to bat and was dressed casually ready to celebrate with his teammates. Following a monumental collapse he only had time to put his whites on over the top as he came to the wicket with Auckland nine down and needing one run to win. He hit the winning run off his first ball, cementing his place as an immortal in Auckland and New Zealand cricket history.

In September 2018, they were one of the six teams invited to play in the first edition of the Abu Dhabi T20 Trophy, scheduled to start in October 2018.

== Champions League Twenty 20 ==
After winning the 2010-11 HRV Cup, the Aces qualified for the 2011 Champions League Twenty20. They were knocked out in the qualifying stage where they lost to Kolkata Knight Riders and Somerset. The Aces again qualified for the 2012 Champions League Twenty20 where they defeated the Sialkot Stallions and Hampshire to top the qualifying stage and made it through to the group stage. They defeated the Kolkata Knight Riders in the first match and lost to the Titans and the Perth Scorchers while the game vs Delhi Daredevils ended without a result. They finished last in the table.

== Personnel ==
At the beginning of each season Auckland Cricket announces 16 contracted players, this does not include players who hold a New Zealand Cricket contract. They are allowed one overseas professional for the Plunket Shield and Ford Trophy. New Zealand domestic teams are allowed to sign as many overseas players as required for the Super Smash, but only two imports are allowed to play at any one time.

== Current squad ==
As of February 2026

- Finn Allen
- Adithya Ashok
- Mark Chapman
- Sid Dixit
- Cam Fletcher
- Lockie Ferguson
- Matt Gibson
- Rohit Gulati
- Martin Guptill
- Ryan Harrison
- Bevon Jacobs
- Harrish Kannan
- Simon Keene
- Ben Lister
- Jock McKenzie
- James Neesham
- Will O'Donnell
- Angus Olliver
- Dale Phillips
- Sean Solia
- Lachie Stackpole
- Samrath Singh
- Jodan Sussex

Source: Auckland cricket

== Notable players ==
New Zealand

- Andre Adams
- Michael Bates
- John Bracewell
- Mark Burgess
- Jeff Crowe
- Bob Cunis
- Ces Dacre
- Colin de Grandhomme
- Lachlan Ferguson
- Martin Guptill
- Gareth Hopkins
- Matt Horne
- Hedley Howarth
- Terry Jarvis
- Richard Jones
- Mitchell McClenaghan
- Tim McIntosh
- Bruce Martin
- Chris Martin
- Kyle Mills
- Danny Morrison
- Colin Munro
- Dion Nash
- Adam Parore
- Dipak Patel
- Chris Pringle
- Jeet Raval
- John Reid
- Mark Richardson
- Ian Smith
- Martin Snedden
- John Sparling
- Craig Spearman
- Scott Styris
- Daryl Tuffey
- Justin Vaughan
- Lou Vincent
- Merv Wallace
- Willie Watson
- Paul Wiseman

England

- James Anderson
- Ravi Bopara
- Steven Croft
- Sam Curran
- Graeme Hick
- Jim Laker
- Mal Loye
- Tymal Mills
- David Willey
- Luke Wright

Sri Lanka

- Aravinda de Silva

Canada

- Ian Billcliff

West Indies

- Kieron Pollard

Australia

- Aaron Finch
- Brad Hodge

Hong Kong

- Mark Chapman

== Records ==
See List of New Zealand first-class cricket records
