= 1863 =

1863 in various calendars
- Gregorian calendar: 1863; MDCCCLXIII
- Ab urbe condita: 2616
- Armenian calendar: 1312; ԹՎ ՌՅԺԲ
- Assyrian calendar: 6613
- Baháʼí calendar: 19–20
- Balinese saka calendar: 1784–1785
- Bengali calendar: 1269–1270
- Berber calendar: 2813
- British Regnal year: 26 Vict. 1 – 27 Vict. 1
- Buddhist calendar: 2407
- Burmese calendar: 1225
- Byzantine calendar: 7371–7372
- Chinese calendar: 壬戌年 (Water Dog); 4560 or 4353 — to — 癸亥年 (Water Pig); 4561 or 4354
- Coptic calendar: 1579–1580
- Discordian calendar: 3029
- Ethiopian calendar: 1855–1856
- Hebrew calendar: 5623–5624
- Hindu calendars
- Vikram Samvat: 1919–1920
- Shaka Samvat: 1784–1785
- Kali Yuga: 4963–4964
- Holocene calendar: 11863
- Igbo calendar: 863–864
- Iranian calendar: 1241–1242
- Islamic calendar: 1279–1280
- Japanese calendar: Bunkyū 3 (文久３年)
- Javanese calendar: 1791–1792
- Julian calendar: Gregorian minus 12 days
- Korean calendar: 4196
- Minguo calendar: 49 before ROC 民前49年
- Nanakshahi calendar: 395
- Thai solar calendar: 2405–2406
- Tibetan calendar: ཆུ་ཕོ་ཁྱི་ལོ་ (male Water-Dog); 1989 or 1608 or 836 — to — ཆུ་མོ་ཕག་ལོ་ (female Water-Boar); 1990 or 1609 or 837

1863 (MDCCCLXIII) was a common year starting on Thursday of the Gregorian calendar and a common year starting on Tuesday of the Julian calendar, the 1863rd year of the Common Era (CE) and Anno Domini (AD) designations, the 863rd year of the 2nd millennium, the 63rd year of the 19th century, and the 4th year of the 1860s decade.

== Events ==
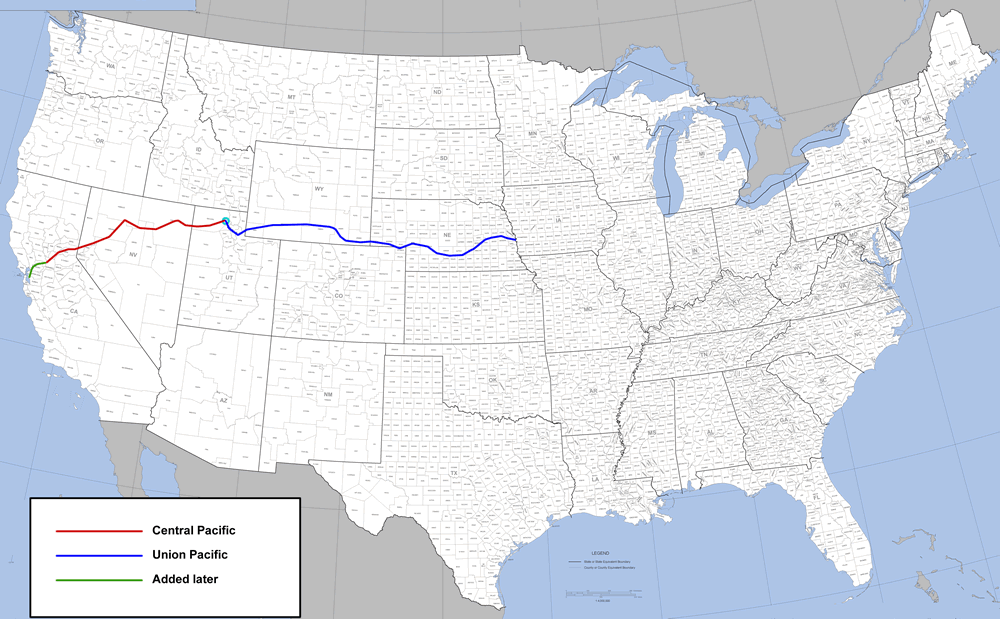
January 8: First transcontinental railroad

=== January ===
- January 1 – Abraham Lincoln signs the Emancipation Proclamation during the third year of the American Civil War, making the abolition of slavery in the Confederate States of America an official war goal. The signing proclaims the freedom of 3.1 million of the nation's four million slaves and immediately frees 50,000 of them, with the rest freed as the Union Army advances. This event marks the start of America's Reconstruction era.
- January 2 – Master Lucius Tar Paint Company (Teerfarbenfabrik Meister Lucius), predecessor of Hoechst as a worldwide chemical manufacturing brand, is founded in a suburb of Frankfurt am Main, Germany.
- January 4 – Founding date of the New Apostolic Church, a Christian and chiliastic church, in a schism with the Catholic Apostolic Church in Hamburg, Germany.
- January 7 – In the Swiss canton of Ticino, the village of Bedretto is partly destroyed and 29 killed by an avalanche.
- January 8
  - The Yorkshire County Cricket Club is founded at the Adelphi Hotel, in Sheffield, England.
  - American Civil War: The Second Battle of Springfield takes place near Springfield, Missouri. Fighting for the Union, General Egbert B. Brown leads the Missouri militia to victory over Confederate General John S. Marmaduke and the 18th Arkansas Infantry.
- January 10 – The first section of the London Underground Railway (Paddington to Farringdon Street) opens officially. This is the world's first ever underground railway.

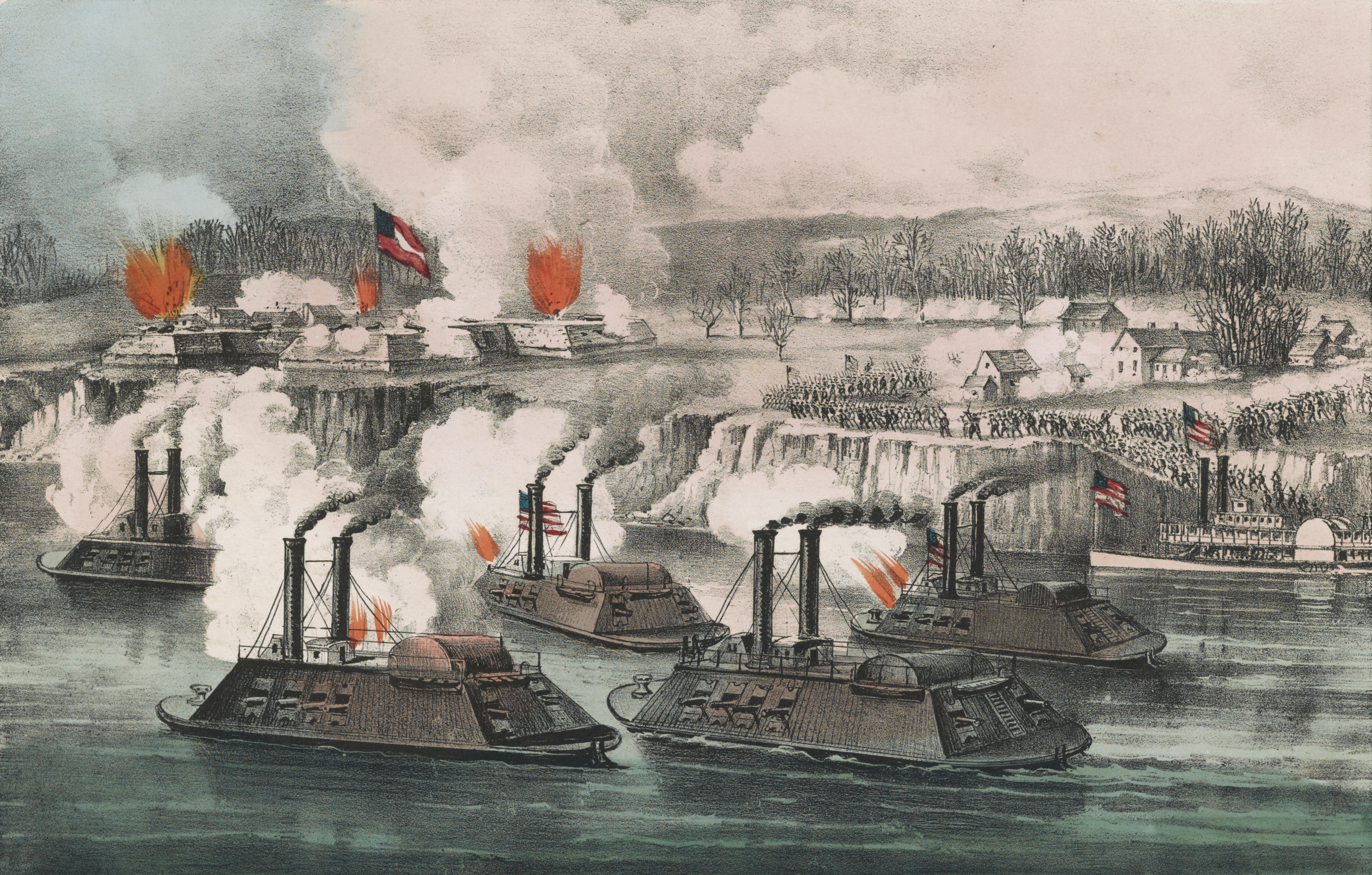
Jan.11: Battle of Arkansas Post.

- January 11
  - American Civil War: Battle of Arkansas Post – General John McClernand and Admiral David Dixon Porter capture the Arkansas River for the Union.
  - In the Swiss canton of Ticino, the roof of the church of Sant'Antonio in Locarno collapses under the weight of snow, killing 47.
- January 15 – French intervention in Mexico: French forces bombard Veracruz.
- January 21 – Adam Opel founds Opel in Germany, originally for the manufacture of sewing machines.
- January 22 – The January Uprising breaks out in Poland, Lithuania and Belarus. The aim of the national movement is to liberate the Polish–Lithuanian–Ruthenian Commonwealth from Russian occupation.
- January 29 – American Indian Wars – Bear River Massacre: The United States Army, led by General Patrick Edward Connor, massacres Chief Bear Hunter and forces of the Shoshone, in the Idaho Territory.
- January 31 – Jules Verne's first adventure novel, Five Weeks in a Balloon (Cinq semaines en ballon), is published in Paris.

=== February ===
- February 1 – Radicals in Lithuania, Belarus, Latvia, northern Ukraine and western Russia join the January Uprising.
- February 2 – January Uprising: Polish peasants are massacred by Russian hussars at Čysta Būda, near Marijampolė.

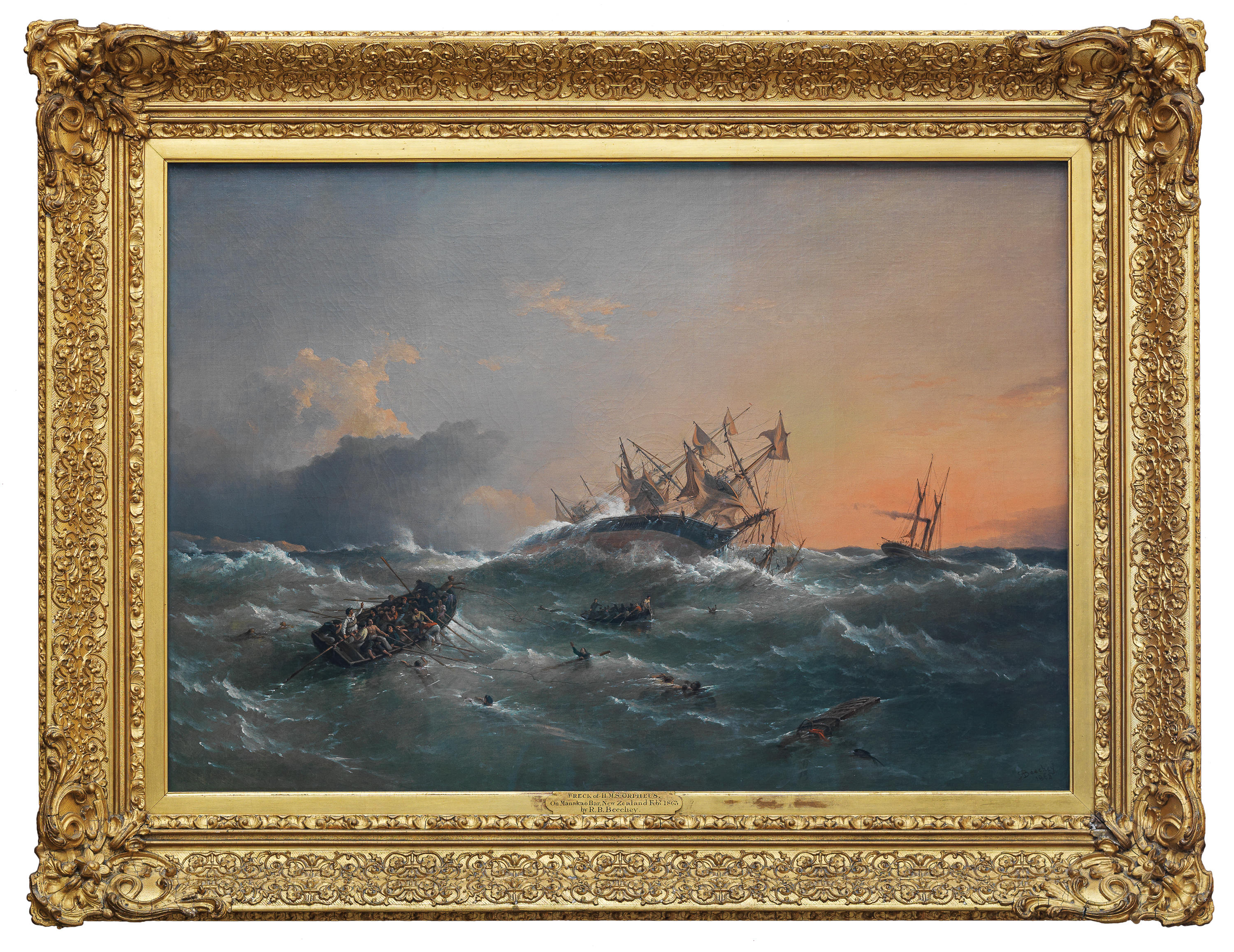
February 7: HMS Orpheus sinks.

- February 7 – HMS Orpheus sinks while attempting to enter Manukau Harbour in New Zealand, with the loss of 189 lives.
- February 10 – Alanson Crane of Virginia patents a fire extinguisher.
- February 17 – The "Committee of the Five" holds their first meeting in Geneva, Switzerland, which is regarded as the foundation of the International Committee of the Red Cross, following the lead of humanitarian businessman Henry Dunant.
- February 24 – Arizona is organized as a United States territory.
- February 26 – Abraham Lincoln signs the National Banking Act into law.

=== March ===
- March 3
  - Idaho Territory is organized by the U.S. Congress.
  - The U.S. National Conscription Act is signed, leading to the New York City draft riots in July.
- March 10 – Albert Edward, Prince of Wales (later Edward VII of the United Kingdom) marries Princess Alexandra of Denmark (later Queen Alexandra).
- March 14 – Queen Victoria issues Letters Patent granting Goulburn city status, making it Australia's first inland city.
- March 19 – The SS Georgiana is destroyed on her maiden voyage while attempting to run the blockade into Charleston, South Carolina. The wreck is discovered exactly 102 years later, by E. Lee Spence.
- March 25 – U.S. Army Private Jacob Parrott, a soldier in "Andrews' Raiders", becomes the first person to receive the Medal of Honor, presented by U.S. Secretary of War Edwin M. Stanton to six of the Raiders. Parrott is followed that day by six others.
- March 30 – Prince Wilhelm George of Denmark is elected at the age of 17 by the Hellenic Parliament as George, King of the Hellenes; he will reign in Greece for 50 years. He arrives in Athens on October 30 to take the throne.

=== April ===
- April 13 – The Winged Victory of Samothrace, one of the most significant sculptures of classical antiquity, is found in excavations on the Greek island of Samothrace by Charles Champoiseau. Made c. 190 BC, it is later shipped to the Louvre in Paris.
- April 14 – The Treaty of Huế is signed between Vietnam and the French Empire.
- April 16 – The first ever submarine to be propelled by mechanized (rather than human) power, Plongeur, of the French Navy, propelled by compressed air, is launched in Rochefort, Charente-Maritime.
- April 17–May 2 – American Civil War: Grierson's Raid – Union cavalrymen are ambushed while crossing the Tickfaw River in Mississippi.
- April 20
  - American Civil War: The Battle of Washington ends inconclusively in Beaufort County, North Carolina.
  - The Augustus of Prima Porta, one of the most significant sculptures of classical antiquity, is found in excavations in the Villa of Livia at Prima Porta, near Rome.
- April 21
  - Ayyam-i butun: Bahá'u'lláh begins a 12-day stay in the Najibiyyih gardens, Baghdad (later known as the Garden of Ridván) during which he declares his station as He whom God shall make manifest. This date is celebrated in the Baháʼí Faith as the festival of Ridván.
  - January Uprising: The Polish peasant army, now led by Zygmunt Sierakowski, achieves its first victory over the Russian army, near Raguva.
- April 24 – The Lieber Code signed and issued by President Abraham Lincoln to the Union forces of the United States in the American Civil War constitutes the world's first official comprehensive code of the modern laws of war.
- April 30 – Battle of Camarón in Mexico: 65 soldiers of the French Foreign Legion fight 2,000 Mexicans.

=== May ===
- May 1–4 – American Civil War: Battle of Chancellorsville – General Robert E. Lee defeats Union forces with 13,000 Confederate casualties, among them Stonewall Jackson (fatally wounded by friendly fire), and 17,500 Union casualties.
- May 8
  - The Granadine Confederation becomes the United States of Colombia, under President Tomás Cipriano de Mosquera.
  - January Uprising: The Polish insurgent army is defeated by the Russians near Gudiškis.
- May 14 – American Civil War: Battle of Jackson, Mississippi – Union General Ulysses S. Grant defeats Confederate General Joseph E. Johnston, opening the way for the siege of Vicksburg.

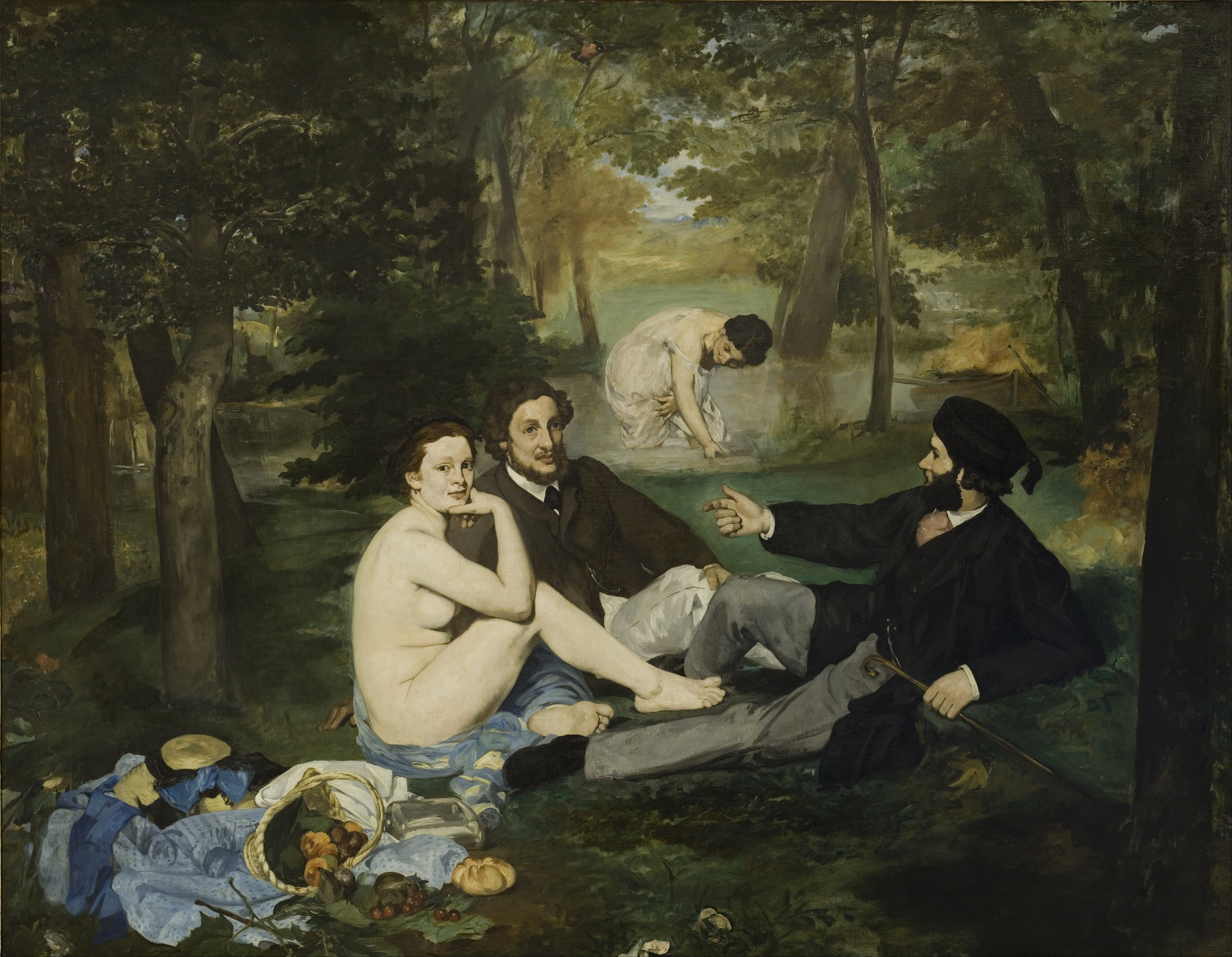
May 17: Manet's Le déjeuner sur l'herbe exhibited.

- May 17
  - After a 2-month siege, the French army of Bazaine takes Puebla, Mexico.
  - The opening of Salon des Refusés in Paris draws attention to paintings by avant-garde artists, notably Manet's_ Le Déjeuner sur l’herbe.
- May 18 – American Civil War: The siege of Vicksburg begins (ends July 4, when 30,189 Confederate men surrender).
- May 21 –
  - American Civil War: The siege of Port Hudson, Louisiana, by Union forces begins.
  - The General Conference of Seventh-day Adventists is formed in Battle Creek, Michigan.
- May 23 – Ferdinand Lassalle founds the Allgemeiner Deutscher Arbeiterverein (General German Workers' Association, ADAV), the first socialist workers party in Germany.
- May 27 – Afghan Civil War (1863–1869): Herat is captured by the forces of Dost Mohammad Khan.
- May 28 – American Civil War: The 54th Massachusetts, the first African-American regiment, leaves Boston to fight for the Union.
- May 31 – The first Prix de l'Arc de Triomphe horse race is held.

=== June ===
- June 7 – French intervention in Mexico: French forces enter Mexico City.
- June 9 – American Civil War: The Battle of Brandy Station, Virginia, ends inconclusively.
- June 12 – The Arts Club is founded by Charles Dickens, Frederic Leighton and others in Hanover Square, London.
- June 13 – Samuel Butler's dystopian article "Darwin among the Machines" is published (under the pen name Cellarius) in The Press newspaper in Christchurch, New Zealand; it will be incorporated into his novel Erewhon (1872).
- American Civil War:
  - June 14 – Second Battle of Winchester – A Union garrison is defeated by the Army of Northern Virginia in the Shenandoah Valley town of Winchester, Virginia.
  - June 17 – The Battle of Aldie in the Gettysburg campaign ends inconclusively.
- June 20 – West Virginia is admitted as the 35th U.S. state.
- June 27 – The Chōshū Five leave Japan secretly to study at University College London, which is part of the ending of sakoku.

=== July ===
- July 1
  - Slavery is abolished in the Dutch colonies of Suriname (independent from 1975) and Curaçao and Dependencies.
  - The Kingston loop line of the London and South Western Railway opens.

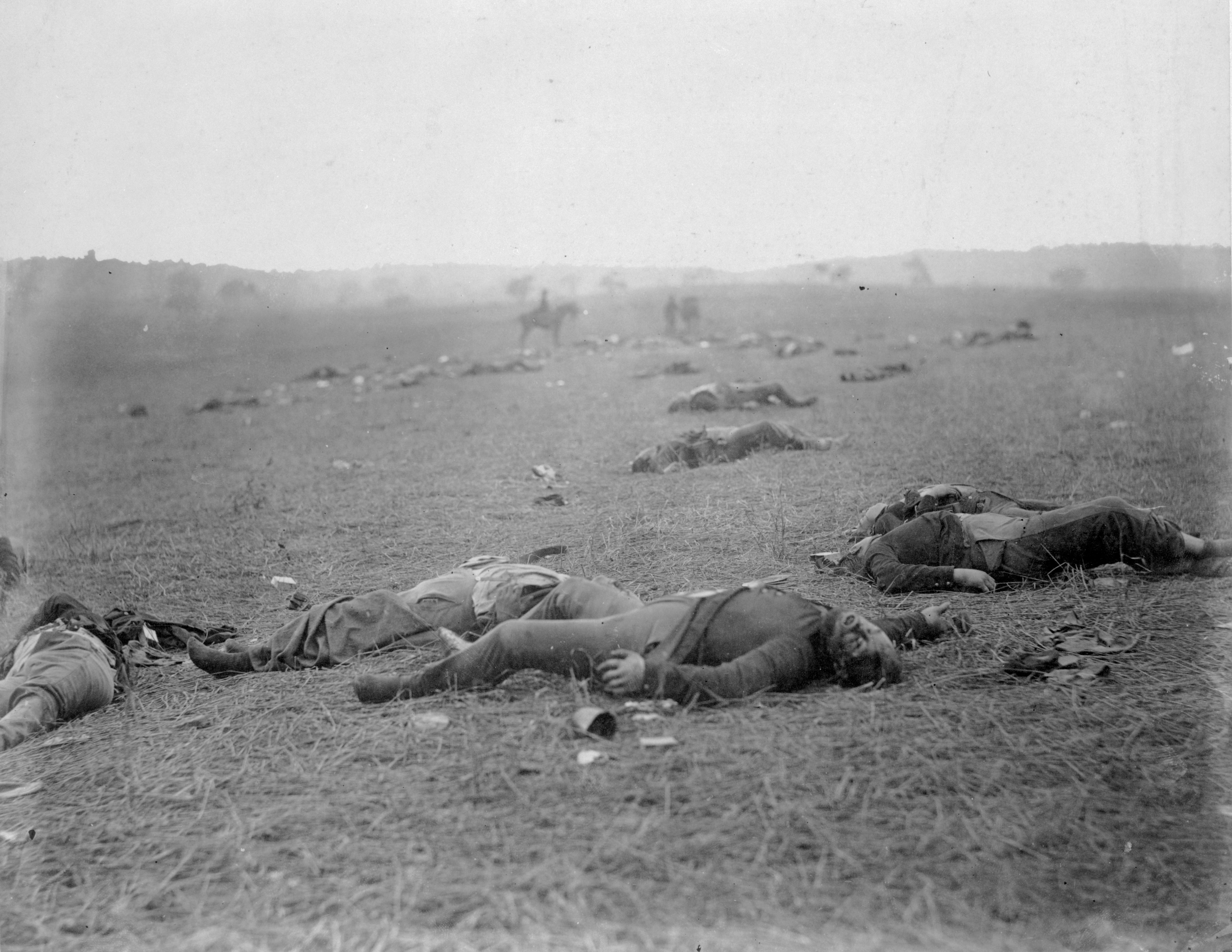
July: Battle of Gettysburg.

- American Civil War:
  - July 1–3 – Battle of Gettysburg – Union forces under George G. Meade turn back a Confederate invasion by Robert E. Lee in the largest battle of the war (28,000 Confederate casualties, 23,000 Union).
  - July 4 – Siege of Vicksburg – Ulysses S. Grant and the Union army capture the Confederate city Vicksburg, Mississippi, after the town surrenders following a 47-day siege.
- July 6 – Queen Victoria issues Letters Patent, annexing to South Australia the part of the colony of New South Wales that will later become the Northern Territory.
- July 9 – American Civil War: The Siege of Port Hudson ends, and the Union controls the entire Mississippi River for the first time.
- July 13 – New York City draft riots: In New York City, opponents of conscription to the American Civil War begin 3 days of violent rioting, which will be regarded as the worst in the history of the United States with around 120 killed.
- July 16 – Battle of Shimonoseki Straits: The screw sloop USS Wyoming engages with the Chōshū Domain fleet before withdrawing, in Japan's first naval engagement between elements of modern navies.
- July 17 – The New Zealand Wars against the Māori people resume, as British forces in New Zealand led by Duncan Cameron begin their Invasion of the Waikato.

American Civil War:

  - July 17 – Battle of Honey Springs – Union troops win a strategic victory over the Confederates for control of Indian Territory north of the Arkansas River.
  - July 18 – The first formal African American military unit, the 54th Massachusetts Volunteer Infantry, unsuccessfully assaults Confederate-held Fort Wagner but their valiant fighting still proves the worth of African American soldiers during the war. Their commander, Colonel Robert Shaw, is shot leading the attack, and is buried with his men (450 Union, along with 175 Confederate).
- July 26 – American Civil War: Morgan's Raid – At Salineville, Ohio, Confederate cavalry leader John Hunt Morgan and 375 of his volunteers are captured by Union forces.
- July 30 – American Indian Wars: Representatives of the United States and tribal leaders including Chief Pocatello (of the Shoshone) sign the Box Elder Treaty.
- July 30 – Valuev Circular bans the publication of religious, educational and training books in Ukrainian in the Russian Empire.

=== August ===
- August 1
  - At the suggestion of Senator J. V. Snellman and the order of Emperor Alexander II, full rights are promised to the Finnish language by a language regulation in the Grand Duchy of Finland.
  - The pharmaceutical brand Bayer is founded by Friedrich Bayer in Germany.
- August 3 – Otago Boys' High School is founded in New Zealand.
- August 8 – American Civil War: Following his defeat in the Battle of Gettysburg, General Robert E. Lee sends a letter of resignation to Confederate President Jefferson Davis (Davis refuses the request upon receipt).
- August 15–17 – Bombardment of Kagoshima: The British Royal Navy bombards the town of Kagoshima in Japan in retribution, after the Namamugi Incident of 1862.
- August 16 – After Spain's annexation of the Dominican Republic, rebels raise the Dominican flag in Santiago to begin the Dominican Restoration War.

American Civil War:

  - August 17 – In Charleston, South Carolina, Union batteries and ships bombard Confederate-held Fort Sumter (the bombardment does not end until December 31).
  - August 21 –
  - Battle of Lawrence: Lawrence, Kansas, is attacked by William Quantrill's raiders, who kill an estimated 200 men and boys. The raid becomes notorious in the North as one of the most vicious atrocities of the Civil War.
  - The American clipper ship Anglo Saxon (westbound) is captured and burned by Confederate privateer Florida off the south coast of Ireland.
- August 26 – The Swedish-language liberal newspaper Helsingfors Dagblad proposes a blue-and-white cross as the flag of Finland.

=== September ===
American Civil War:

  - September 6 – Confederates evacuate Battery Wagner and Morris Island, in South Carolina.
  - September 19–20 – Battle of Chickamauga – Confederate forces turn back a Union invasion of Georgia.
- September 30 – Georges Bizet's opera Les pêcheurs de perles debuts, at the Théâtre Lyrique in Paris.
- September – The Western Railroad from Fayetteville, North Carolina, to the coal fields of Egypt, North Carolina, is completed.

=== October ===
- October 3 – U.S. President Abraham Lincoln proclaims a national Thanksgiving Day, to be celebrated on the final Thursday in November.
- October 5 – The Brooklyn, Bath and Coney Island Rail Road starts operations in Brooklyn, New York, making it the oldest right-of-way on the New York City Subway, the largest rapid transit system in the United States, and one of the largest in the world.
- American Civil War:
  - October 14 – Battle of Bristoe Station – Confederate General Robert E. Lee's forces fail to drive the Union army out of Virginia.
  - October 15 – The Confederate submarine H. L. Hunley, first tested in July, sinks during another test, killing Horace Lawson Hunley (its inventor) and a crew of seven.

October: Red Cross

- October 26–29 – The Resolutions of the Geneva International Conference are signed by sixteen countries meeting in Geneva agreeing to form the International Red Cross.
- October 29 – American Civil War: Battle of Wauhatchie – Forces under Union General Ulysses S. Grant, having fought through the night, ward off a Confederate attack led by General James Longstreet. Union forces thus open a supply line into Chattanooga, Tennessee.

=== November ===
- November 4 – Hector Berlioz's opera Les Troyens is performed for the first time, at the Théâtre Lyrique in Paris.
- November 15 – King Christian IX of Denmark succeeds his distant cousin Frederick VII, giving rise to the beginning of the Second Schleswig-Holstein crisis.
- American Civil War:
  - November 16 – Battle of Campbell's Station – Near Knoxville, Tennessee, Confederate troops led by General James Longstreet unsuccessfully attack Union forces under General Ambrose Burnside.
  - November 17 – Siege of Knoxville – Confederate forces led by General James Longstreet place Knoxville, Tennessee, under siege (the two-week-long siege and an attack are unsuccessful).
- November 18 – King Christian IX of Denmark signs the November Constitution, which declares Schleswig to be part of Denmark, regarded by the German Confederation as a violation of the London Protocol of 1852, leading to the German–Danish war of 1864.
- November 19 – U.S. President Abraham Lincoln delivers the Gettysburg Address, at the military cemetery dedication ceremony in Gettysburg, Pennsylvania.
- American Civil War:
  - November 23 – Battle of Chattanooga III – Union forces led by General Ulysses S. Grant reinforce troops at Chattanooga, Tennessee, and counter-attack Confederate troops.
  - November 24 – Battle of Lookout Mountain – Near Chattanooga, Tennessee, Union forces under General Ulysses S. Grant capture Lookout Mountain, and begin to break the Confederate siege of the city, led by General Braxton Bragg.
  - November 25 – Battle of Missionary Ridge – At Missionary Ridge in Tennessee, Union forces led by General Ulysses S. Grant break the siege of Chattanooga, by routing Confederate troops under General Braxton Bragg.
  - November 26 – Mine Run – Union forces under General George Meade position against troops led by Confederate General Robert E. Lee (Meade's forces cannot find any weaknesses in the Confederate lines, and give up trying after five days).
  - November 27 – Confederate cavalry leader John Hunt Morgan and several of his men escape the Ohio state prison, and return safely to the South.

=== December ===
- December 1 – The first steam-operated passenger railway in New Zealand opens at Christchurch in South Island.
- December 6 – C.S.A.C. Fides Quadrat Intellectum, the First Reformed student society, is founded at the Theologische Universiteit Kampen (Broederweg), in Kampen, the Netherlands.
- December 8 – The Church of the Company Fire in Santiago, Chile, kills between 2,000 and 3,000 people.
- December 15
  - Romania opens its first mountain railway (from Anina to Oravița).
  - Gerard Adriaan Heineken, 22, buys the brewery 'De Hooiberg' ("The Haystack") in Amsterdam.
- December 19 – Linoleum is patented in the United Kingdom.

=== Date unknown ===
- The Second Anglo-Ashanti War (1863–1864) begins.
- Bartolomé Mitre secretly backs the revolt of Venancio Flores against the Uruguayan Blanco government.
- Douglas becomes the capital of the Isle of Man, after its parliament (Tynwald) moves its chambers from Castletown.
- The first outbreak of phylloxera on the European mainland is observed, in the vineyards of the southern Rhône region of France.
- The recipe for the herbal liqueur Bénédictine is devised by Alexandre Le Grand in Fécamp, France.
- Richard Owen publishes the first description of a fossilised bird, Archaeopteryx.
- The Colmar Treasure, a hoard of 14th century Jewish precious metal objects, is discovered in Alsace.

== Births ==
=== January–March ===
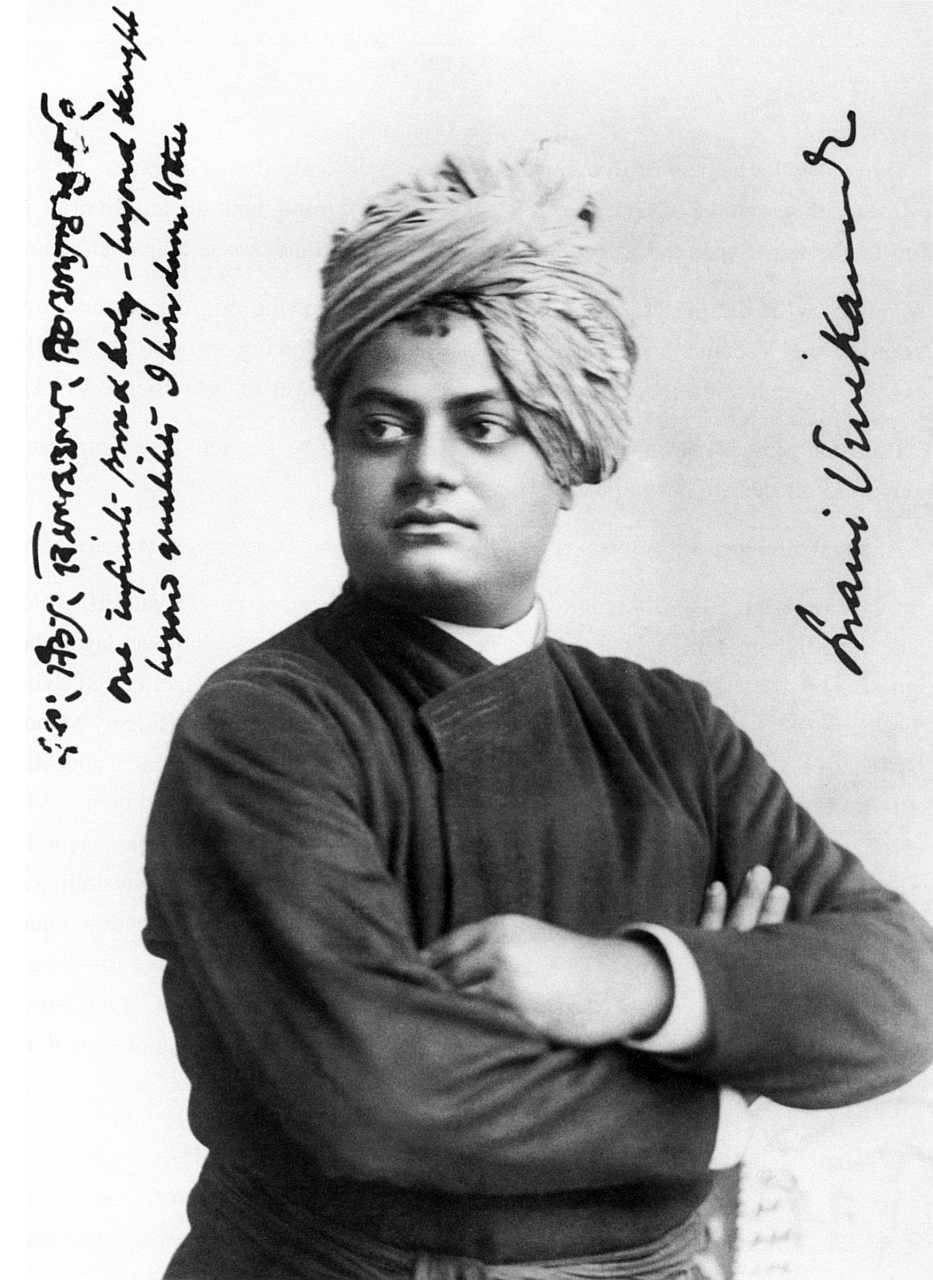
Swami Vivekananda

- January 1 – Pierre de Coubertin, French founder of the modern Olympic Games (d. 1937)
- January 7 – Anna Murray Vail, American botanist and first librarian of the New York Botanical Garden (d. 1955)
- January 12 – Swami Vivekananda, Indian Hindu religious leader (d. 1902)
- January 14 – Manuel Gomes da Costa, Portuguese general, 10th president of Portugal (d. 1929)
- January 15 – Wilhelm Marx, Chancellor of Germany (d. 1946)
- January 17
  - David Lloyd George, Prime Minister of the United Kingdom (d. 1945)
  - Constantin Stanislavski, Russian theatre practitioner, founder of modern realistic acting (d. 1938)
- January 28 – Ernest William Christmas, Australian painter (d. 1918)
- February 11 – John F. Fitzgerald, Mayor of Boston (d. 1950)
- March 1 – Sydney Deane, Australian cricketer, actor (d. 1934)
- March 9 – Emelie Tracy Y. Swett, American author (d. 1892)
- March 11 – Andrew Stoddart, English sportsman (d. 1915)
- March 12 – Gabriele D'Annunzio, Italian writer, war hero and politician (d. 1938)
- March 13 – Maria Mikhailovich Volkonskaya, Russian princess, Catholic convert and writer (d. 1943)
- March 19 – Howard Gould, American actor (d. 1938)
- March 27 – Henry Royce, English automobile pioneer (d. 1933)

=== April–June ===
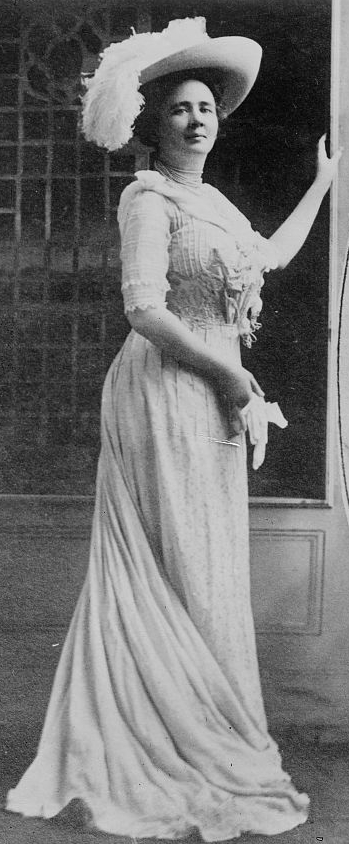
Helen Dortch Longstreet

- April 15 – Ida Freund, Austrian-born chemist and educator (d. 1914)
- April 18 – Count Leopold Berchtold, Austro-Hungarian foreign minister (d. 1942)
- April 20 – Helen Dortch Longstreet, American social advocate, librarian and newspaper woman (d. 1962)
- April 28 – Josiah Thomas, Australian politician (d. 1933)
- April 29
  - William Randolph Hearst, American newspaper publisher (d. 1951)
  - Mary Theresa Ledóchowska, Polish missionary sister (d. 1922)
- May 18 – Ehrhard Schmidt, German admiral (d. 1946)
- May 21 – Archduke Eugen of Austria, Austrian field marshal (d. 1954)
- May 24 – George Grey Barnard, American sculptor (d. 1938)
- May 29 – Arthur Mold, English cricketer (d. 1921)
- June 2 – Felix Weingartner, Austrian conductor (d. 1942)
- June 13 – Lucy, Lady Duff-Gordon, English fashion designer (d. 1942)
- June 17 – Charles Michael, Duke of Mecklenburg, head of the House of Mecklenburg-Strelitz (d. 1934)

=== July–September ===
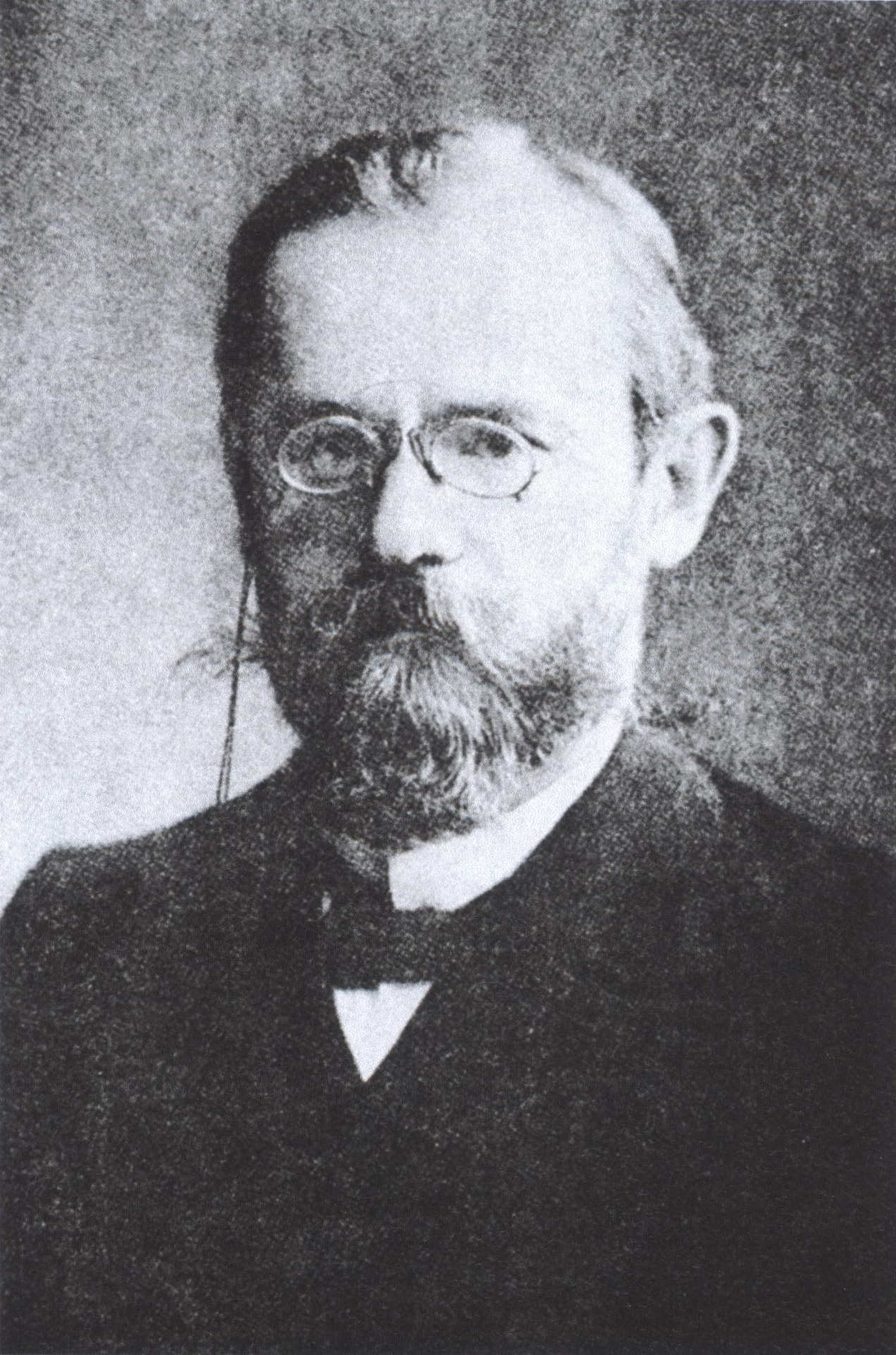
Hugo Winckler

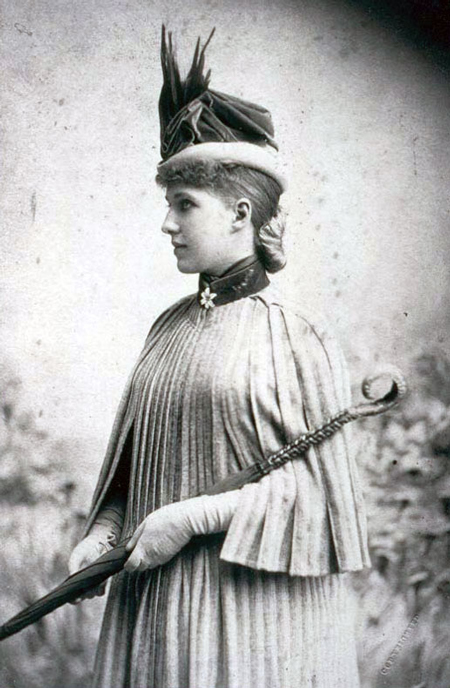
Amélie Rives Troubetzkoy

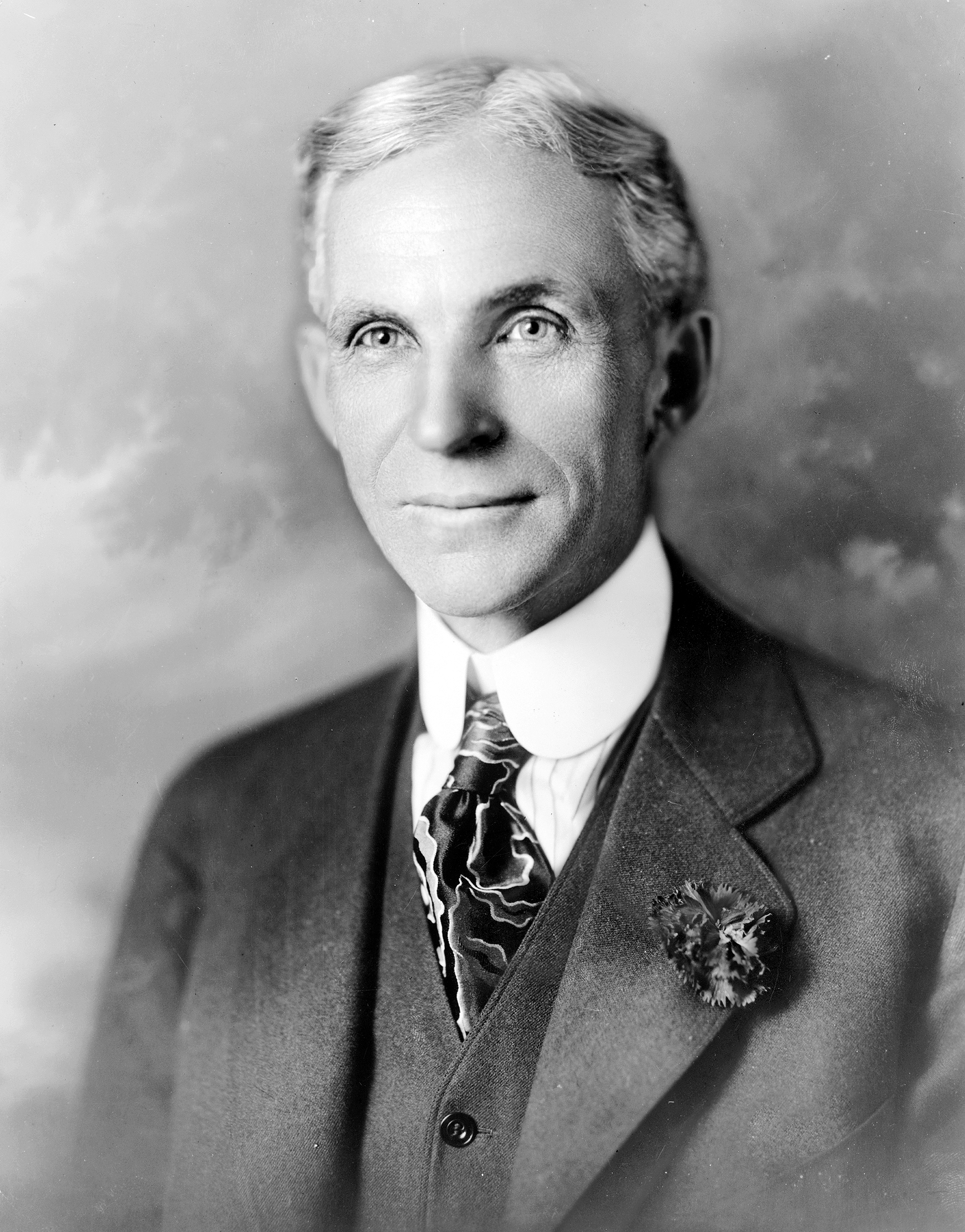
Henry Ford

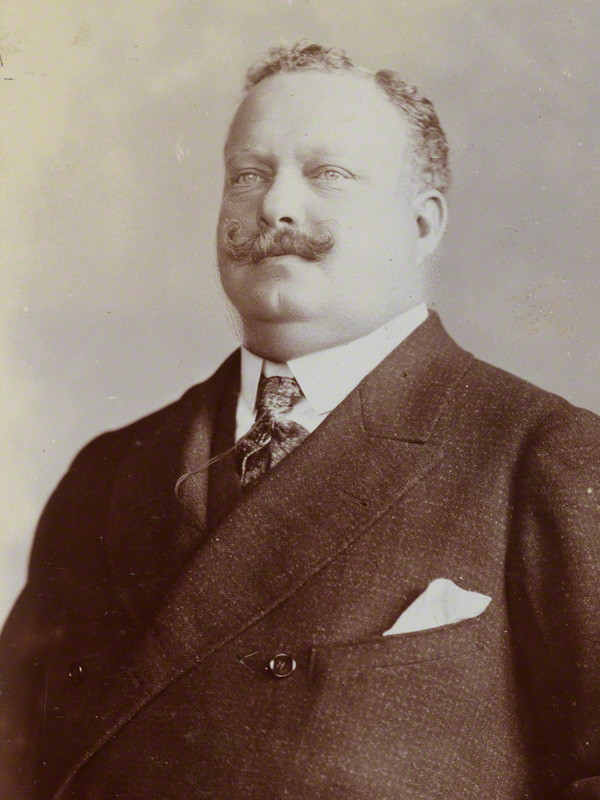
Carlos I of Portugal

- July 1 – William Grant Stairs, Canadian explorer (d. 1892)
- July 4 – Hugo Winckler, German archaeologist and historian, uncovers the capital of the Hittite Empire (Hattusa) (d. 1913)
- July 6 – Reginald McKenna, British Chancellor of the Exchequer (1915–1916) (d. 1943)
- July 15 – Gonzalo Córdova, 21st president of Ecuador (d. 1928)
- July 21 – C. Aubrey Smith, English actor (d. 1948)
- July 25 – Alison Skipworth, English actress (d. 1952)
- July 30 – Henry Ford, American automobile manufacturer, industrialist (d. 1947)
- August 1 – Gaston Doumergue, President of France during the Third Republic (d. 1937)
- August 3 – Géza Gárdonyi, Hungarian author (d. 1922)
- August 15 – Jesse Price, American politician and member of the United States House of Representatives from 1914 to 1919 (d. 1939)
- August 17 – Gene Stratton-Porter, American author, screenwriter and naturalist (d. 1924)
- August 23 – Princess Amélie Rives Troubetzkoy, American author (d. 1945)
- August 24 – Carrie Ashton Johnson, American editor, author (d. 1949)
- August 24 – Dragutin Lerman, Croatian writer, African explorer, East Congo commissioner (d. 1918)
- September 1 – João Pinheiro Chagas, Prime Minister of Portugal (d. 1925)
- September 13
  - Arthur Henderson, Scottish politician, recipient of the Nobel Peace Prize (d. 1935)
  - Franz von Hipper, German admiral (d. 1932)
- September 21
  - John Bunny, American film comedian (d. 1915)
  - Catherine Backus, American sculptor (d. 1955)
- September 22
  - Alexandre Yersin, Swiss-French physician, bacteriologist (d. 1943)
  - G. R. S. Mead, British writer (d. 1933)
- September 25 – S. Isadore Miner, American columnist writing as "Pauline Periwinkle" (d. 1916)
- September 28 – King Carlos I of Portugal (k. 1908)
- September 30 – Reinhard Scheer, German admiral (d. 1928)

=== October–December ===
- October 4 – Samuel P. Bush, American businessman and industrialist (d. 1948)
- October 7 – Clarence Stewart Williams, American admiral (d. 1951)
- October 11
  - Lionel Cripps, Rhodesian politician (d. 1950)
  - Louis Cyr, Canadian strongman (d. 1912)
- October 16 – Austen Chamberlain, English politician, recipient of the Nobel Peace Prize (d. 1937)
- November 8 – Eero Järnefelt, Finnish realist painter (d. 1937)
- November 11 – Paul Signac, French Neo-Impressionist painter (d. 1935)
- November 14 – Leo Baekeland Belgian-born American chemist (d. 1944)
- November 20 – Zeffie Tilbury, English stage, film actress (daughter of Lydia Thompson) (d. 1950)
- November 23 – János Hadik, 19th prime minister of Hungary (d. 1933)
- November 24 – Leberecht Maass, German admiral (d. 1914)
- November 28 – Eremia Grigorescu, Romanian general (d. 1919)
- November 30 – Andrés Bonifacio, Filipino revolutionary leader (d. 1897)
- December 1
  - Qasim Amin, Egyptian writer (d. 1908)
  - Black Elk/ Heȟáka Sápa', Oglala Teton Lakota (Western Sioux) medicine/holy man (d. 1950)
- December 5 – Paul Painlevé, mathematician and 2-time prime minister of France (d. 1933)
- December 7
  - Felix Calonder, Swiss politician (d. 1952)
  - Richard Warren Sears, American businessman (d. 1914)
  - Pietro Mascagni, Italian composer (d. 1945)
- December 8 – Albert Abrams, American doctor (d. 1924)
- December 11
  - Georg Bruchmüller, German artillery officer (d. 1948)
  - Annie Jump Cannon, American astronomer (d. 1941)

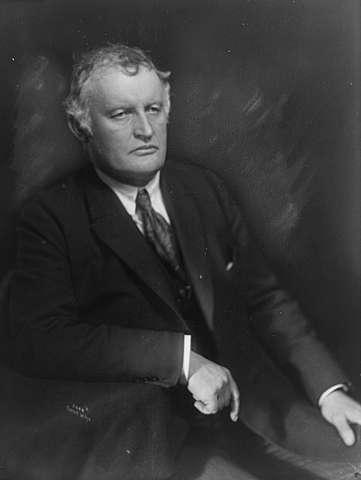
Edvard Munch

- December 12
  - Edvard Munch, Norwegian painter (d. 1944)
  - Sahibzada Abdul Qayyum, British India politician, educationist (d. 1937)
- December 13 – Harry Todd, American actor (d. 1935)
- December 14 – Kenneth Balfour, British Conservative Party politician (d. 1936)
- December 16 – George Santayana, Spanish-born philosopher, poet, essayist and novelist (d. 1952)
- December 18 – Archduke Franz Ferdinand of Austria (k. 1914)

== Deaths ==
=== January–June ===
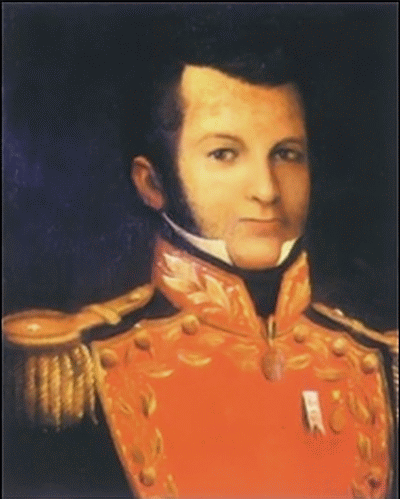
Antonio Valero de Bernabé

- January 1 – William B. Renshaw, United States Navy officer (killed in action) (b. 1816)
- February 7 – William Farquharson Burnett, British commodore (drowned) (b. 1815)
- February 10 – Emma Catherine Embury, American author (b. 1806)
- April 1 – Jakob Steiner, Swiss mathematician (b. 1796)
- April 10 – Giovanni Battista Amici, Italian astronomer, microscopist and botanist (b. 1786)
- April 21 – Sir Robert Bateson, 1st Baronet, Irish nobility (b. 1782)
- May 7 – Earl Van Dorn, American Confederate general (murdered) (b. 1820)
- May 10 – Thomas J. "Stonewall" Jackson, American Confederate general (died of wounds) (b. 1824)
- June 7 – Antonio Valero de Bernabé, Latin American liberator (b. 1790)
- June 9 – Dost Mohammad Khan, Emir of Kabul, King of Kandahar (b. 1793)
- June 24 – Sir George Elliot, British admiral (b. 1784)
- June 26 – Andrew Hull Foote, American admiral (b. 1800)

=== July–December ===
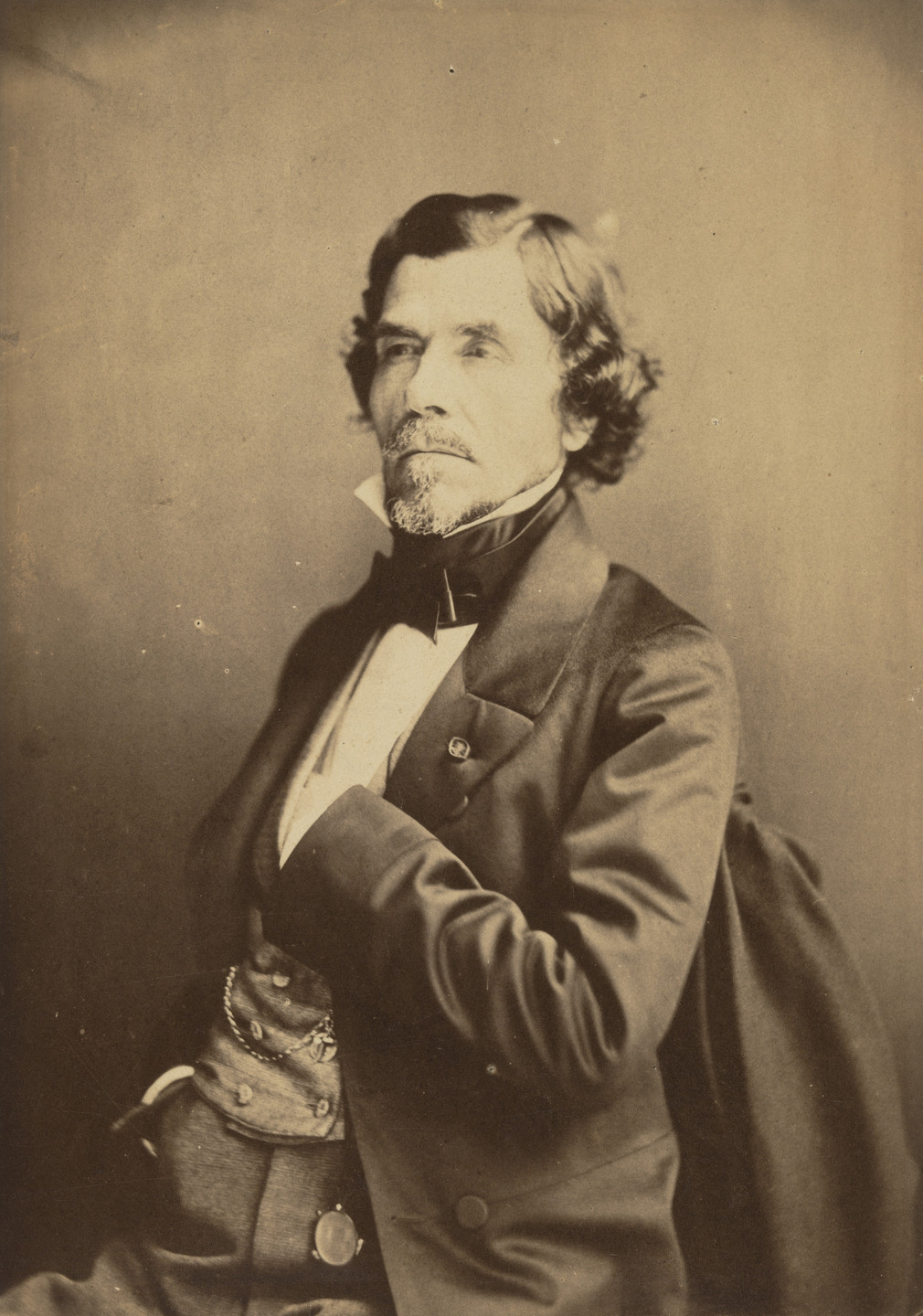
Eugène Delacroix

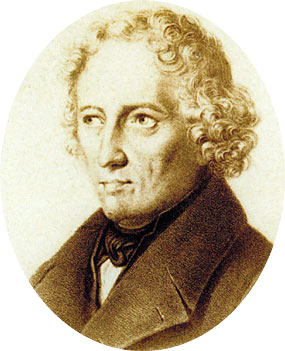
Jacob Grimm

- July 1 – John F. Reynolds, American general (killed in action) (b. 1820)
- July 5 – Lewis Armistead, American Confederate general (died of wounds) (b. 1817)
- July 10 – Clement Clarke Moore, American writer and teacher (b. 1779)
- July 18 – Robert Gould Shaw, American Union Army officer (killed in action) (b. 1837)
- July 21 – Josephine Kablick, Czech botanist and paleontologist (b. 1787)
- July 26 – Sam Houston, first President of the Republic of Texas (b. 1793)
- August 1 – Jind Kaur, Indian royal, Maharani of Punjab (b. 1817)
- August 13 – Eugène Delacroix, French painter (b. 1798)
- September 17 – Alfred de Vigny, French author (b. 1797)
- September 20 – Jacob Grimm, German folklorist (b. 1785)
- September 21 – Benjamin Hardin Helm, Confederate politician and general (died of wounds) (b. 1831)
- October 13 – Philippe Antoine d'Ornano, Marshal of France (b. 1784)
- November 2 – Theodore Judah, American railroad engineer (yellow fever) (b. 1826)
- November 13 – Ignacio Comonfort, President of Mexico 1855-1857 (killed in action) (b. 1812)
- November 15 – King Frederick VII of Denmark (b. 1808)
- December 2 – Jane Pierce, 15th First Lady of the United States (b. 1806)
- December 13 – Christian Friedrich Hebbel, German writer (b. 1813)
- December 16 – John Buford, American general (b. 1826)
- December 24 – William Makepeace Thackeray, British novelist (b. 1811)

== In fiction ==
- The film Glory (1989, starring Morgan Freeman, Denzel Washington and Matthew Broderick) shows the events of 1863, notably the assault on Fort Wagner.
- The film Gangs of New York (starring Daniel Day-Lewis, Leonardo DiCaprio and Cameron Diaz) is set in New York City in 1863.
- The main protagonist of Red Dead Redemption 2, Arthur Morgan, is born in 1863.
