= Neil Dorreen =

New Zealand cricketer

- Dorreen in 1930

Personal information
- Born: 11 October 1901; Hampden, Otago, New Zealand
- Died: 20 August 1984 (aged 82); Hastings, New Zealand
- Batting: Right-handed
- Role: Wicketkeeper-batsman

Domestic team information
- Years: Team
- 1927-28 to 1930-31: Canterbury

Career statistics
Competition	First-class
Matches	5
Runs scored	192
Batting average	38.40
100s/50s	1/0
Top score	105 not out
Balls bowled	0
Wickets	–
Bowling average	–
5 wickets in innings	–
10 wickets in match	–
Best bowling	–
Catches/stumpings	11/6
- Source: Cricinfo, 9 June 2019

Neil Dorreen (11 October 1901 – 20 August 1984) was a New Zealand cricketer who played five matches of first-class cricket for Canterbury between 1928 and 1931.

Dorreen was a wicket-keeper, but was best known for his hard hitting in the middle and lower order. In a senior club match for St Albans in the Christchurch competition in March 1927 he scored 226 not out, hitting nine sixes, and adding 311 in an unbroken stand for the fifth wicket in 130 minutes.

He replaced Bob Burns as Canterbury's wicket-keeper in the final match of the 1929-30 Plunket Shield. In that match, Dorreen set a New Zealand seventh-wicket record that still stands. In Canterbury's first innings he joined John Powell at the wicket at 239 for six and the pair added 265 in about two hours, taking the score from 300 to 500 in 85 minutes. Powell was out for 164, and Dorreen finished on 105 not out. Canterbury declared at 523 for 7, made off 106 overs, and dismissed Otago for 124, winning by an innings and 227 runs inside two days. Dorreen kept his spot in the Canterbury team throughout 1930–31. His batting record was less spectacular, but he caught seven batsmen and stumped three, and Canterbury won the Plunket Shield.

He also played rugby over several seasons in the 1920s for Canterbury.

He married Elsie Martin (1907–1995) in June 1931, and they moved to Taradale, Hawke's Bay, where they took up farming. They had a daughter and a son.
