= Robert Burn =

Robert Burn may refer to:

- Robert Burn (classicist) (1829–1904), English classical scholar and archaeologist
- Robert Burn (naturalist) (born 1937), Australian naturalist and citizen scientist
- Robert Scott Burn (1825–1901), Scottish engineer and author
- Robert Burn (architect) (1752–1815) Scottish architect

== See also ==
- Robert Burns (1759–1796), Scottish poet
- Robert Burns (disambiguation)
