= Alexandre Le Grand =

Alexandre Le Grand may refer to:

- Alexander the Great, known in French as le Grand
- Alexandre le Grand, a stage play by Jean Racine
- Alexandre Le Grand (merchant) (1830–1898), the inventor of Bénédictine liqueur
