= Bobby Burns =

Bobby Burns may refer to:

- Bobby Burns (actor) (1878–1966), American film actor and director
- Bobby Burns (footballer) (born 1999), Northern Irish footballer
- Bobby Burns (ice hockey) (1905–1995), Canadian ice hockey player
- Bobby Burns, heavy metal guitarist for the band Primer 55
- Robert Burns (1759–1796), Scottish poet and lyricist
- Bobby Burns (drink), a type of cocktail

== See also ==
- Bob Burns (disambiguation)
- Robert Burns (disambiguation)
