= James Slight =

James Slight may refer to:

- Jim Slight (1855–1930), Australian cricketer
- James Slight, 19th century British agricultural writer, who wrote The Book of Farm Implements & Machines with Robert Scott Burn
- James Slight (engineer) (1785–1854), lighthouse engineer, assistant to Robert Stevenson
