= Bob Burns =

Bob Burns may refer to:

- Bob Burns (actor) (1884–1957) in The Lonely Trail
- Bob Burns (American football coach) (1921–2000), American football player and coach
- Bob Burns (Arizona politician) (born 1938), Member of the Arizona Corporation Commission
- Bob Burns (cricketer) (1900–1993), New Zealand cricketer
- Bob Burns (drummer) (1950–2015), original drummer in Lynyrd Skynyrd
- Bob Burns (footballer) (1884–1949), Australian rules footballer for Collingwood
- Bob Burns (golfer) (born 1968), American PGA Tour and Nationwide Tour professional golfer
- Bob Burns (humorist) (1890–1956), American radio and film comedian of the 1930s and 1940s
- Bob Burns (Missouri politician) (born 1948), American politician and member of the Missouri House of Representatives
- Bob Burns (running back) (born 1952), former American football running back
- Bob Burns III (1935–2025), American actor and archivist

== See also ==
- Bobby Burns (disambiguation)
- Robert Burns (disambiguation)
- Burns (surname)
