= Robert Burns (disambiguation) =

Robert Burns (1759–1796) was a Scottish poet.

Robert, Rob, or Robbie Burns may also refer to:

== Arts and entertainment ==
- Robert Burnes (1719–1789), uncle of Robert Burns the poet
- Robert Burns (artist) (1869–1941), Scottish art nouveau and decorative arts painter and designer
- Robert A. Burns (1944–2004), American art director and production designer
- Rob Burns (born 1953), English/New Zealand bass player and author

== Law and politics ==
- Robert Burns (New Hampshire politician) (1792–1866), American politician from New Hampshire
- Robert Easton Burns (1805–1863), Canadian lawyer, judge, and chancellor of the University of Toronto
- Robert H. Burns (1870–?), American politician from Wisconsin
- Robert Burns (Oklahoma politician) (1874–1950), American attorney and politician from Oklahoma
- Robert L. Burns (1876–1955), American politician from California
- Robert Burns (Iowa politician) (1922–2001), American politician from Iowa
- Robert Burns (New Jersey politician) (1926–2016), American politician from New Jersey
- Robert Burns (Quebec politician) (1936–2014), Canadian politician from Quebec
- Sir Robert Andrew Burns (born 1943), British diplomat
- R. Nicholas Burns (born 1956), American diplomat

== Others ==
- Robert Burns (theologian) (1789–1869), Scottish theological writer and church leader
- Robert Francis Burns (1840–1883), Irish-Australian convicted murderer
- Robert Elliott Burns (1892–1955), American author of I Am a Fugitive from a Georgia Chain Gang!
- Robert K. Burns (1896–1982), American biologist known for sexual differentiation in vertebrates
- Robert Whitney Burns (1908–1964), US Air Force lieutenant general
- Robert Lee Burns (c. 1930–2002), American bank robber involved in an extradition cause célèbre
- Robert Burns (cyclist) (born 1968), Australian cyclist
- Robbie Burns (footballer) (born 1990), English footballer

== Statues ==
- Bust of Robert Burns (Houston), Texas, United States
- Robert Burns (Steell), by John Steell
- Robert Burns (Stevenson), by William Grant Stevenson
- Robert Burns Memorial (Barre), by J. Massey Rhind
- Robert Burns Memorial (Montreal), by G. A. Lawson

== Other uses ==
- SS Robert F. Burns, a Liberty ship

== See also ==
- Bobby Burns (disambiguation)
- Bob Burns (disambiguation)
- Robert Byrne (disambiguation)
- Robert Burn (disambiguation)
- Rob Byrnes (born 1958), American gay novelist and blogger
