= John Powell (cricketer) =

New Zealand cricketer (1904–1959)

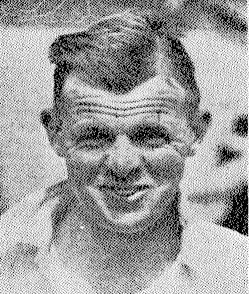
- Powell in 1930

Personal information
- Full name: John Llewellyn Powell
- Born: 21 March 1904; Christchurch, New Zealand
- Died: 30 November 1959 (aged 55); Prebbleton, Christchurch, New Zealand
- Batting: Right-handed
- Bowling: Right-arm medium-pace

Domestic team information
- Years: Team
- 1928–29 to 1932–33: Canterbury

Career statistics
Competition	First-class
Matches	10
Runs scored	406
Batting average	36.90
100s/50s	1/1
Top score	164
Balls bowled	12
Wickets	0
Bowling average	–
5 wickets in innings	–
10 wickets in match	–
Best bowling	–
Catches/stumpings	3/–
- Source: CricketArchive, 27 February 2017

John Llewellyn Powell (21 March 1904 – 30 November 1959) was a cricketer who played first-class cricket in New Zealand from 1928 to 1933.

== Life and career ==
Powell was born in Christchurch and educated at Christchurch Boys' High School. Tall and strongly built, he had a reputation as a big hitter. In Christchurch senior cricket for Riccarton he scored more than 5000 runs and hit ten centuries, "each of them memorable for their violence and speed".

Although Powell was an all-rounder in club cricket, for Canterbury he played as a specialist batsman who went in late in the order. In 1930 he established a New Zealand seventh-wicket record that still stands. Canterbury and Otago went into their final game of the 1929–30 Plunket Shield season at Lancaster Park, Christchurch, equal at the bottom of the table with no victories, so the match would decide who finished last. Otago batted first and made 172 off 71.2 overs. Canterbury replied more positively and were 226 for 5 when stumps were drawn at the fall of the fifth wicket. Powell began his innings at the beginning of the second day, and was soon joined by Neil Dorreen when the sixth wicket fell at 239. Powell and Dorreen put on 265 for the seventh wicket in about two hours. Powell was out for 164 in 130 minutes after reaching his century in 110 minutes. The pair took the score from 300 to 500 in 85 minutes. The Christchurch paper The Press reported that "[Powell's] scoring strokes had a punch behind them that is rarely seen in representative cricket". He survived several missed catches and stumpings. "On the whole it was a delightful mixture of sound and orthodox batting and forceful hitting, in which risks were taken." Canterbury declared at 523 for 7, made off 106 overs, and dismissed Otago for 124, winning by an innings and 227 runs inside two days.

Powell had a farm at Prebbleton, outside Christchurch. He died there suddenly while driving his tractor in November 1959, aged 55. He left a wife, a son and two daughters.
