= Bobby Burns (drink) =

Whiskey cocktail

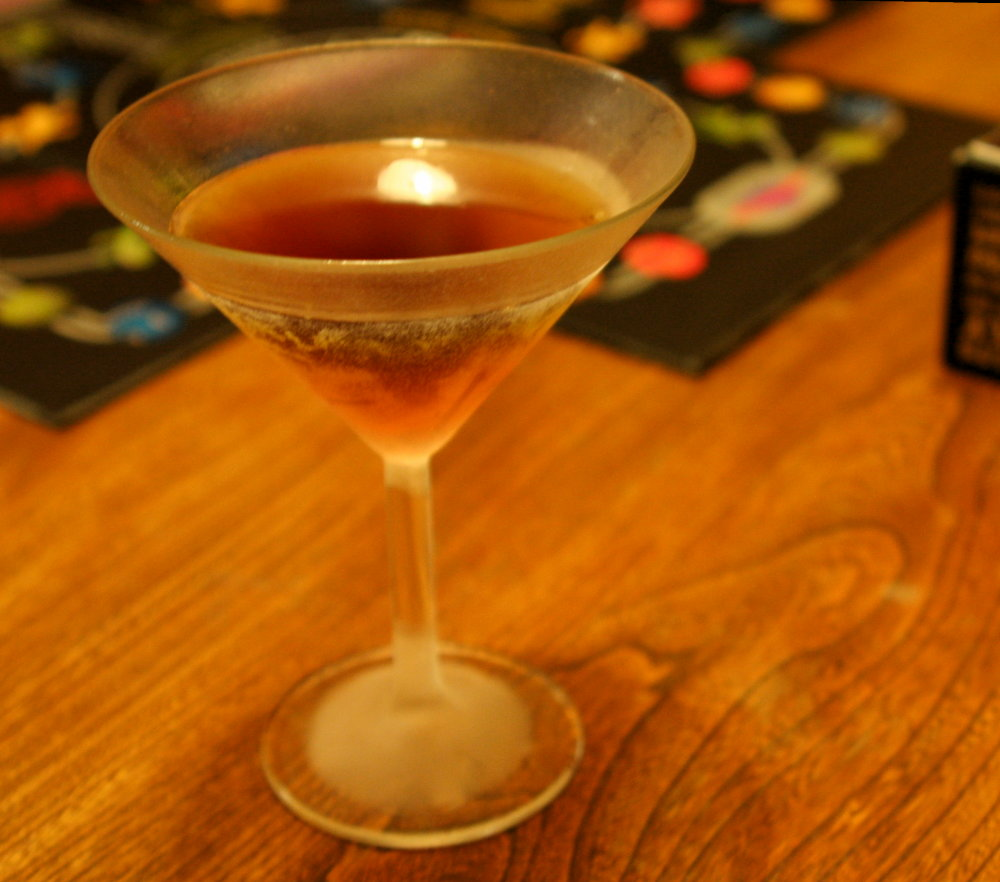
- A Bobby Burns cocktail
- Type: Cocktail
- Ingredients: 4.5 cl Scotch whisky; 4.5 cl red vermouth; 3 dashes Bénédictine; Lemon peel
- Standard drinkware: Cocktail glass
- Served: Straight up: chilled, without ice
- Preparation: Put all liquid ingredients in cocktail shaker filled with ice. Squeeze lemon peel on top. Stir, strain into glass.

The Bobby Burns is a whisky cocktail composed of scotch, vermouth and Bénédictine liqueur. It is served in a 130 ml (4.5 US fl oz) cocktail glass.

The drink is named for Robert Burns, the Scottish poet, but is not considered a national drink in the way the Rusty Nail is.

== History ==
The original recipe comes from the 1900 edition of Fancy Drinks, published by Bishop & Babcock where it is called the "Baby Burns". The "Robert Burns" name appears in the 1908 Jack's Manual and 1914 Drinks made with Irish whiskey, vermouth and absinthe. In later publications it starts to be called by the more informal "Bobby Burns" name, with the original Irish whiskey recipe appearing in Recipes for Mixed Drinks (1917). The 1948 recipe from The Fine Art of Mixing Drinks replaced the Bénédictine with Drambuie and bitters.

== See also ==
- List of cocktails
