= Bénédictine =

French herbal liqueur

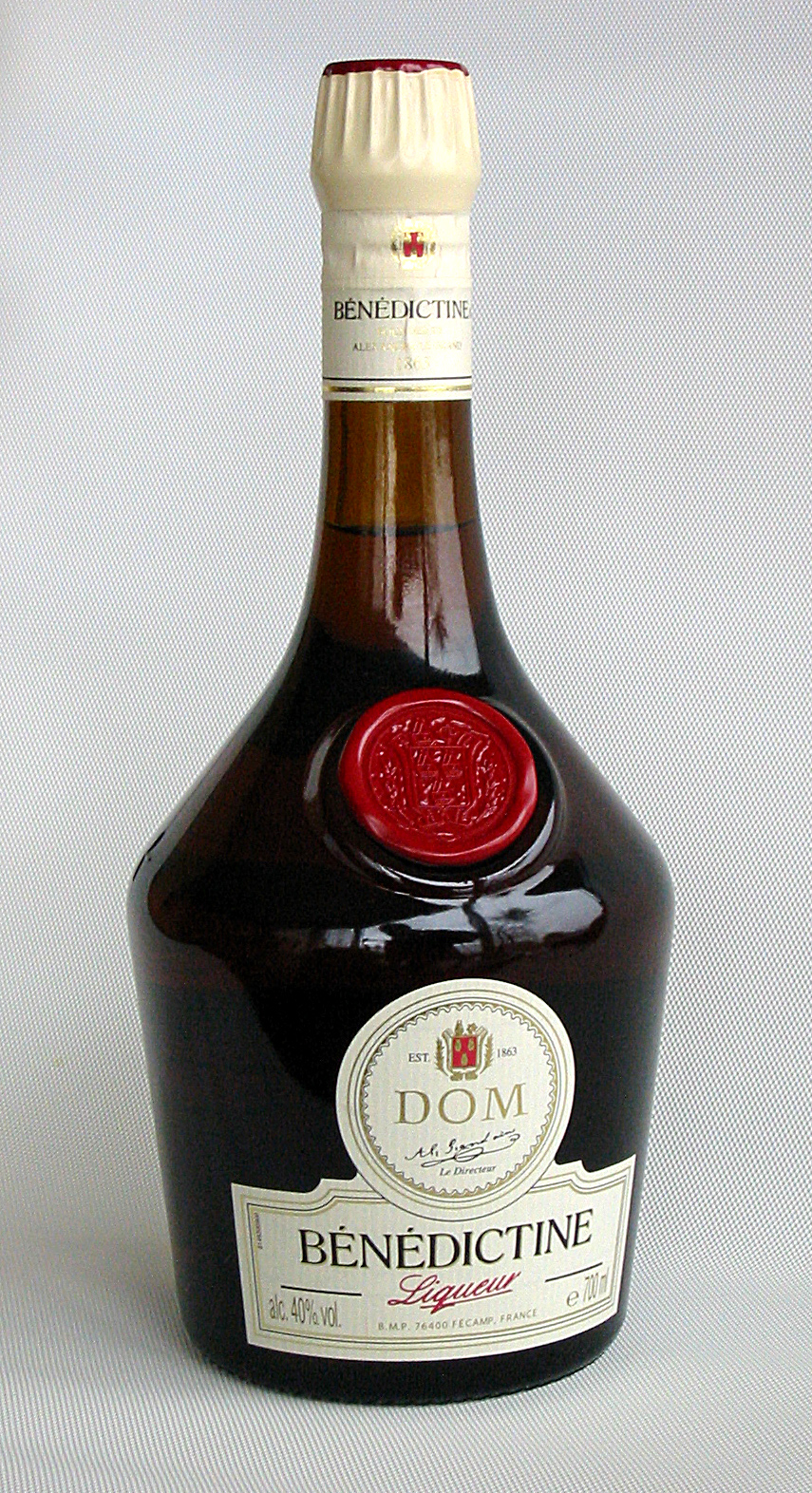
The longstanding bottle and label of Bénédictine

Bénédictine (French pronunciation: [benediktin]) is an herbal liqueur produced in France. It was developed by wine merchant Alexandre Le Grand in the 19th century and is flavored with twenty-seven flowers, berries, herbs, roots, and spices. A drier version, B&B, blending Bénédictine with brandy, was developed in the 1930s.

== History ==
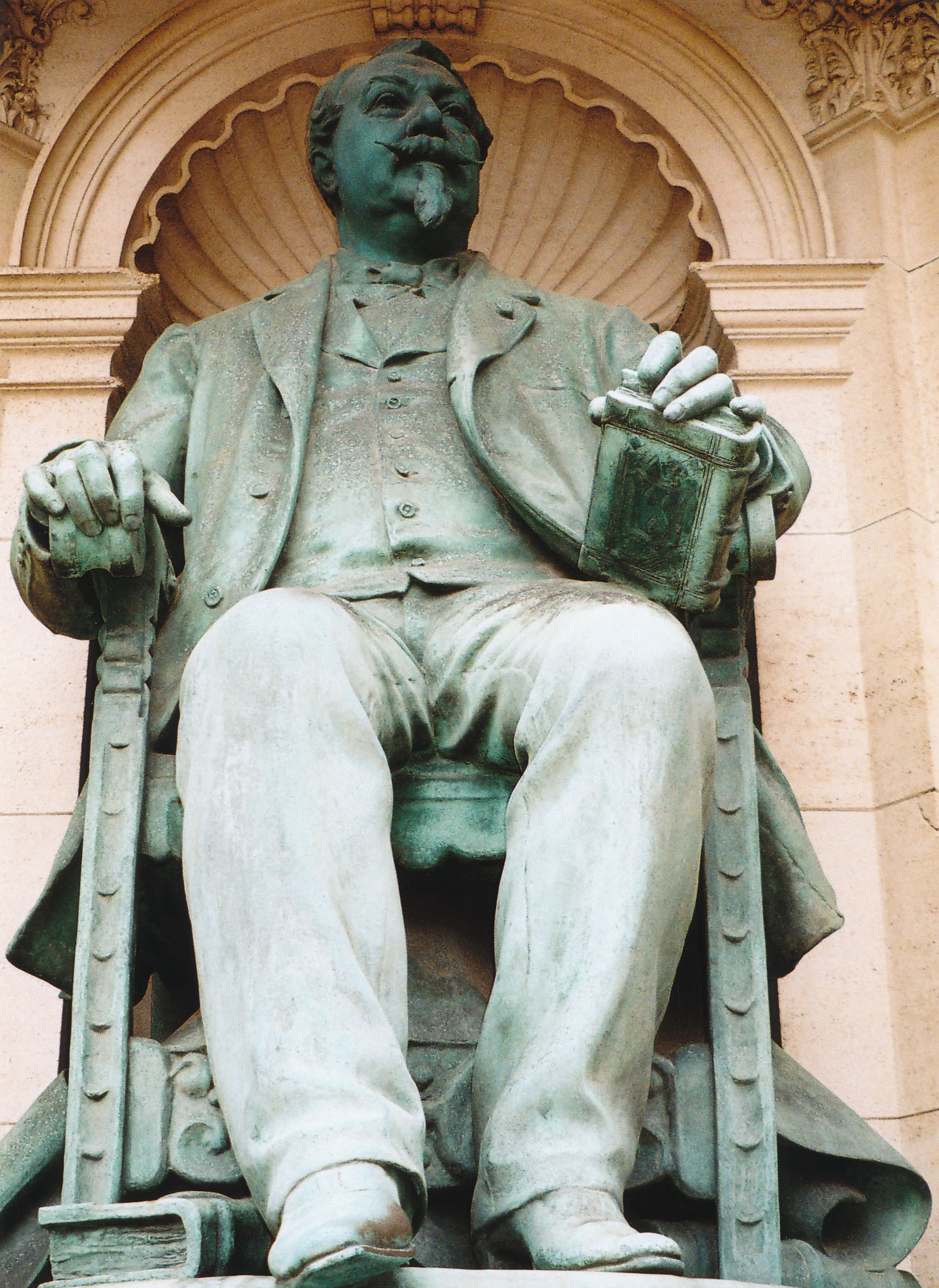
A statue of Alexandre Le Grand, founder of the Palais Bénédictine

In 1863, Alexandre Le Grand developed a recipe for a herbal liqueur, with help from a local chemist, based on old medicinal recipes he had acquired from a religious foundation where a maternal grandparent had served as a fiscal prosecutor. To market it, Le Grand embellished the story, claiming monks at the Benedictine Abbey of Fécamp in Normandy developed it and produced it until the abbey's devastation during the French Revolution. Le Grand began production under the trade name "Bénédictine", using a bottle with a distinguishing shape and label. To reinforce the myth, Le Grand placed the abbreviation "D.O.M." on the label, for "Deo Optimo Maximo" ("To God, most good, most great"), used at the beginning of documents by the Benedictine Order to dedicate their work.

In 1982, just 15% of the liqueur production was sold in France, with 45% going to the United States of America. As a result of returning Great War soldiers of the East Lancashire Regiment having acquired a taste for the drink while stationed in France, people in Burnley, England, drink Bénédictine with hot water, known as "Bene 'n' 'ot", and the Burnley Miners Club is reputedly the largest single customer. The abbey at Fécamp was used for a convalescence hospital.

In 1986, the Martini & Rossi group took control of Bénédictine. In 1992, they were, in turn, bought out by Bacardi for a reported $1.4 billion.

By 2010, around 75% of the production had been exported. This marked a significant increase in its popularity in France. The biggest consumers of Bénédictine are the United States, Malaysia and Singapore.

== Recipe ==
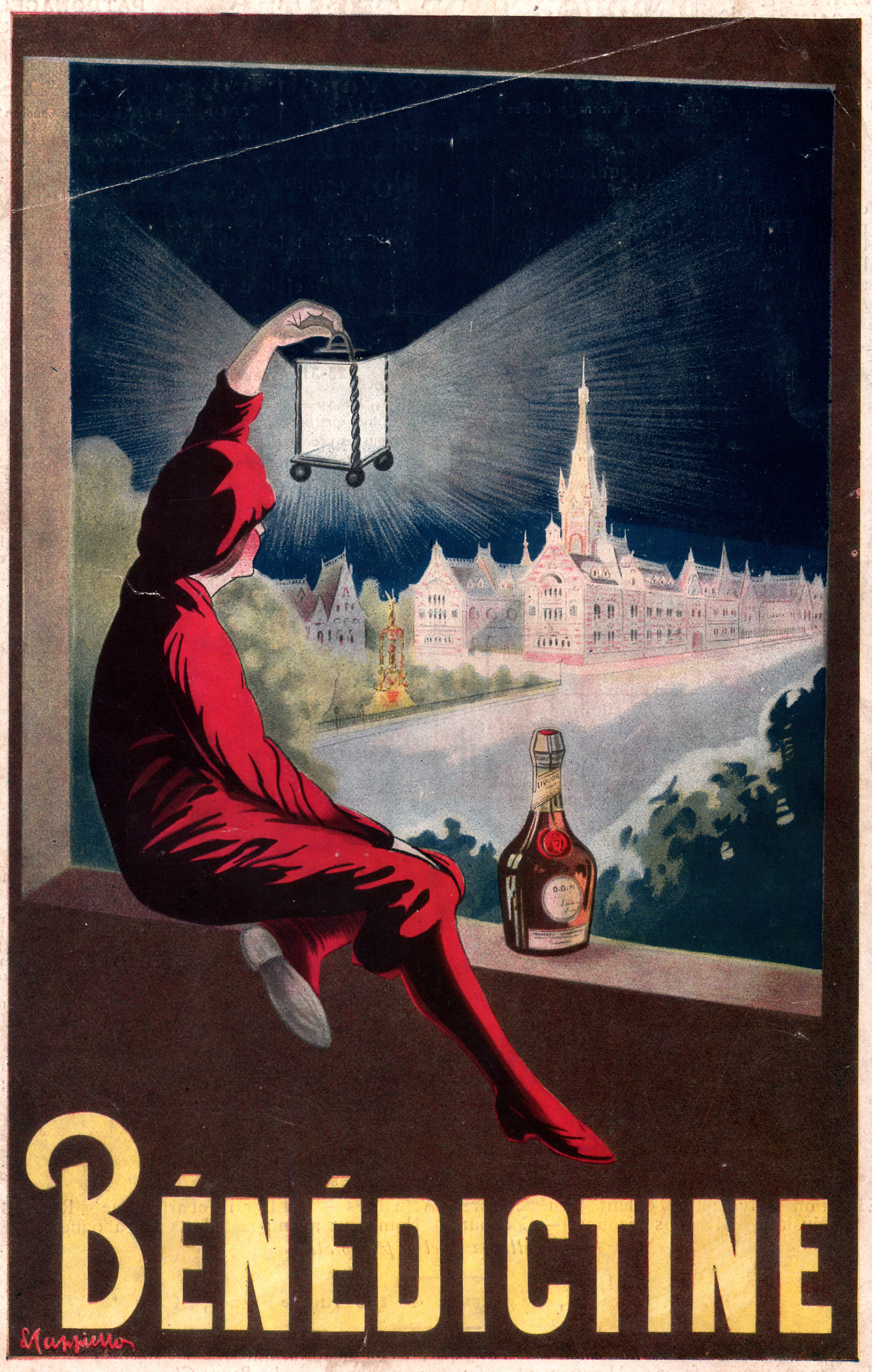
A poster from 1908 advertising Bénédictine

The recipe is a closely guarded trade secret, purportedly known to only three people at any given time. So many people have tried to reproduce it that the company maintains on its grounds in Fécamp a "Hall of Counterfeits" (Salle des Contrefaçons). The bottle and label have been imitated, as has the name Bénédictine. The company prosecutes those it feels are infringing on its intellectual property.

The manufacturing process involves several distillations, which are then blended. The recipe of Bénédictine is a commercial secret. Still, it is known to contain 27 herbs and spices, of which the following 21 are publicly known: angelica, hyssop, juniper, myrrh, saffron, mace, fir cones, aloe, arnica, lemon balm, tea, thyme, coriander, clove, lemon, vanilla, orange peel, honey, red berries, cinnamon, and nutmeg.

== Other products ==
The same company also produces "B & B" (or Bénédictine and Brandy), developed in the 1930s in response to a shift in taste toward drier (less sweet) liqueurs, simply by blending Bénédictine with brandy. Originally, both products were 43% alcohol by volume (86 proof), but they are now 40% alcohol (80 proof).

In 1977, the company introduced a 30% alcohol (60 proof) coffee liqueur called Café Bénédictine, a blend of Bénédictine and a coffee-flavored liqueur, but it has been discontinued. The company also produces Bénédictine Single Cask, which comes in a unique black bottle and is only available at the Palais de la Bénédictine's store in Fécamp, Normandy, France.
