= Alexandre Le Grand (merchant) =

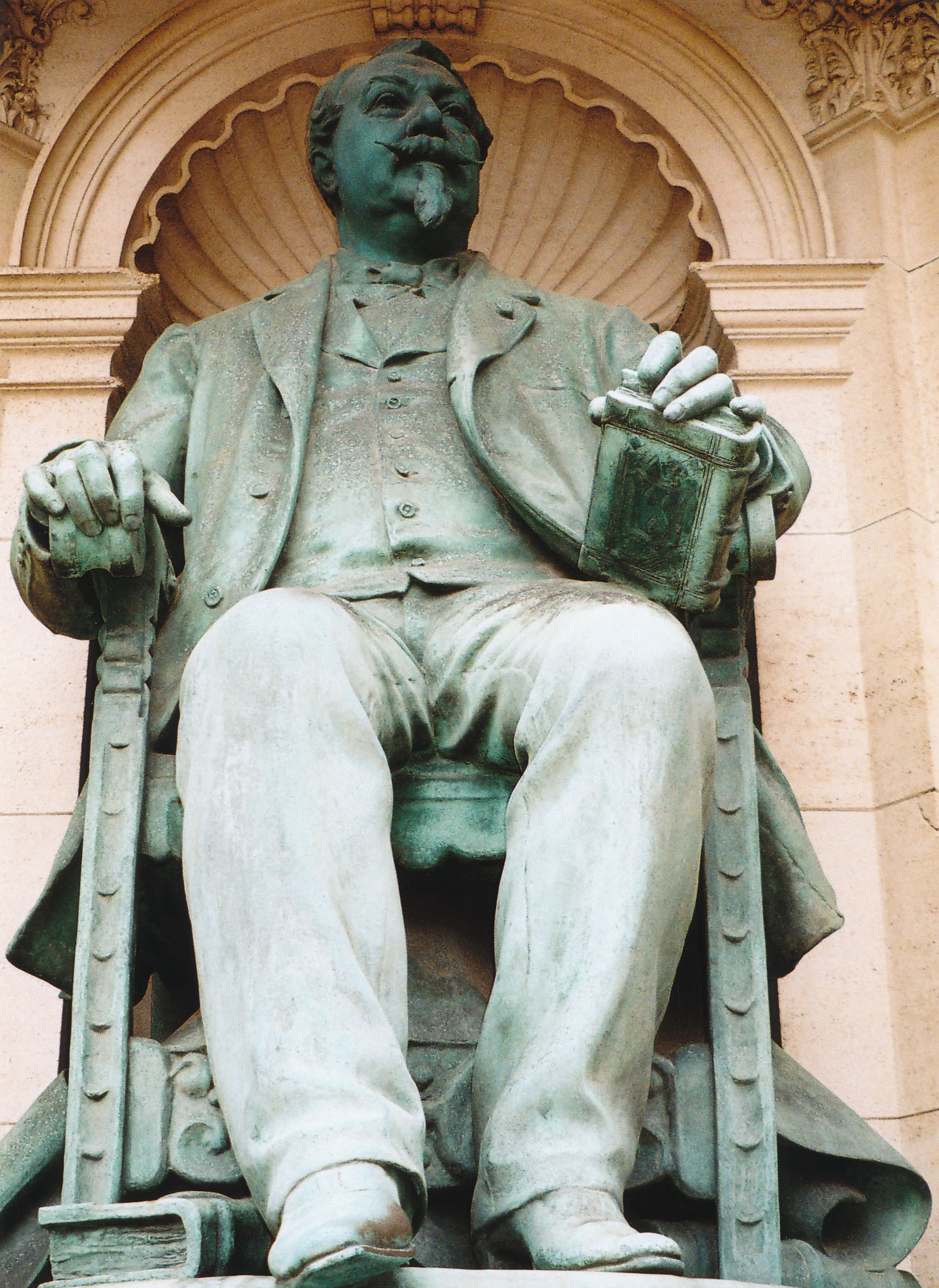
A statue of Alexandre Le Grand in the Palais Bénédictine

Alexandre-Prosper-Hubert Le Grand (6 June 1830 – 25 June 1898) was a wine merchant and industrialist of the 19th century who, in 1863, invented the liqueur known as Bénédictine from a mixture of native herbs and exotic spices.

== Biography ==
Born in Fécamp as the son of a sea captain, Le Grand discovered, in 1863, an old grimoire in the library of the abbey of Fécamp containing medicinal and herbal recipes collected by the monks of the abbey. With the aid of a pharmacist, he developed the recipe for the liqueur that would make him famous.

Inheriting a habit of eclecticism from his father, Alexandre Le Grand raised the Palais Bénédictine, a building whose architectural style was a mélange of Gothic, Renaissance, and Art Nouveau, and which in 1888 he made into the headquarters of the Bénédictine company. This building still exists and contains, in addition to the distillery, a museum dedicated to the liqueur.

In recognition of his achievements, Le Grand was made an Officer of the Legion of Honor, captain of firefighters, a city councilor of Fécamp, a member of the general council of Seine-Maritime, and a Knight Commander of the Order of St. Gregory the Great.

== Bénédictine ==
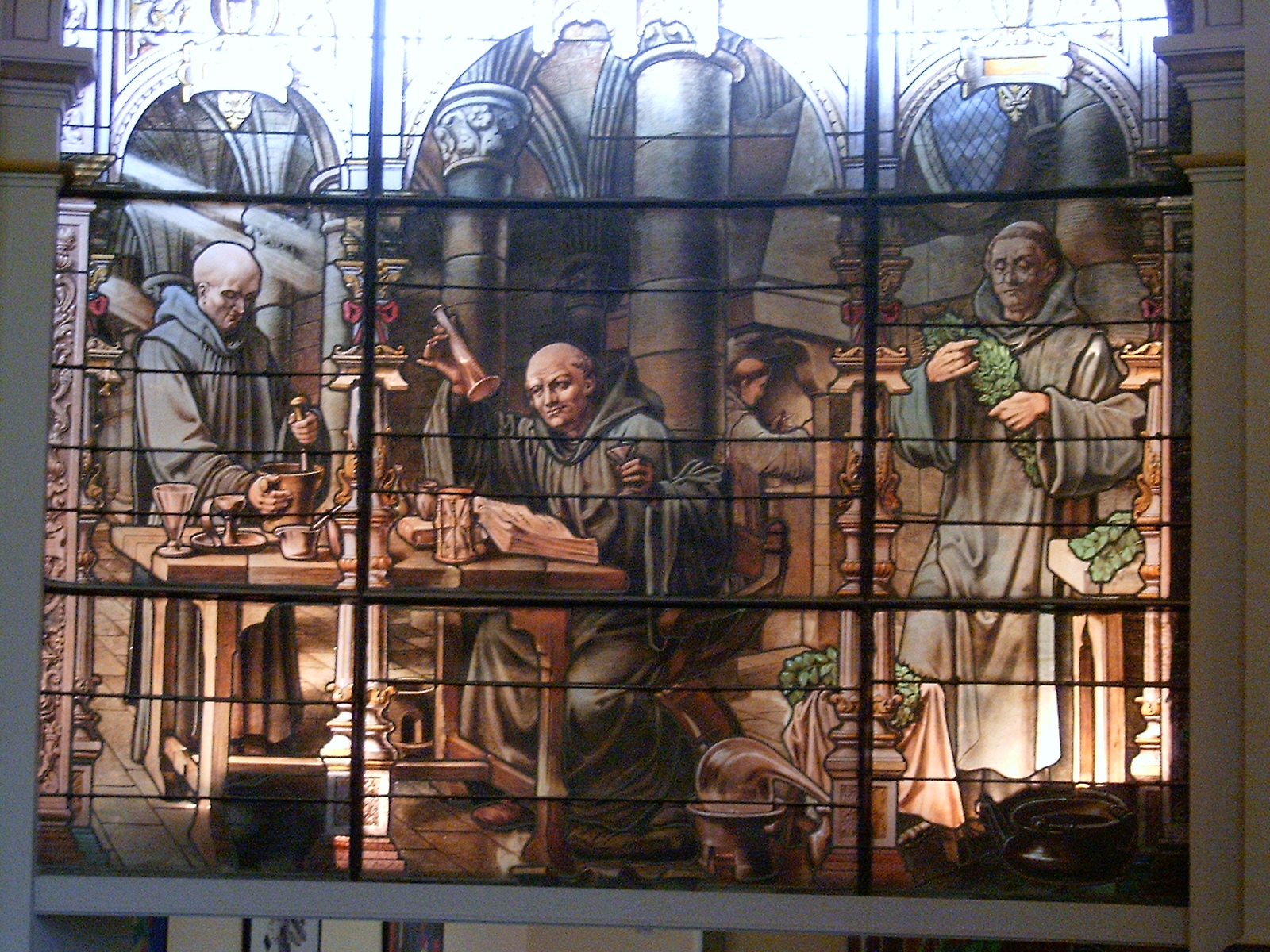
The legend of Bénédictine in stained glass, at the Palais Bénédictine.

The modern history of Bénédictine liqueur begins in 1863 when Alexandre Legrand – an industrialist, a merchant in wine and spirits, and also an art collector – discovered in his family library a 16th-century grimoire belonging to the Benedictine abbey of Fécamp. The book would have belonged to his grandfather, Prosper Elie Couillard, a procureur fiscal who might have acquired it during the French Revolution.

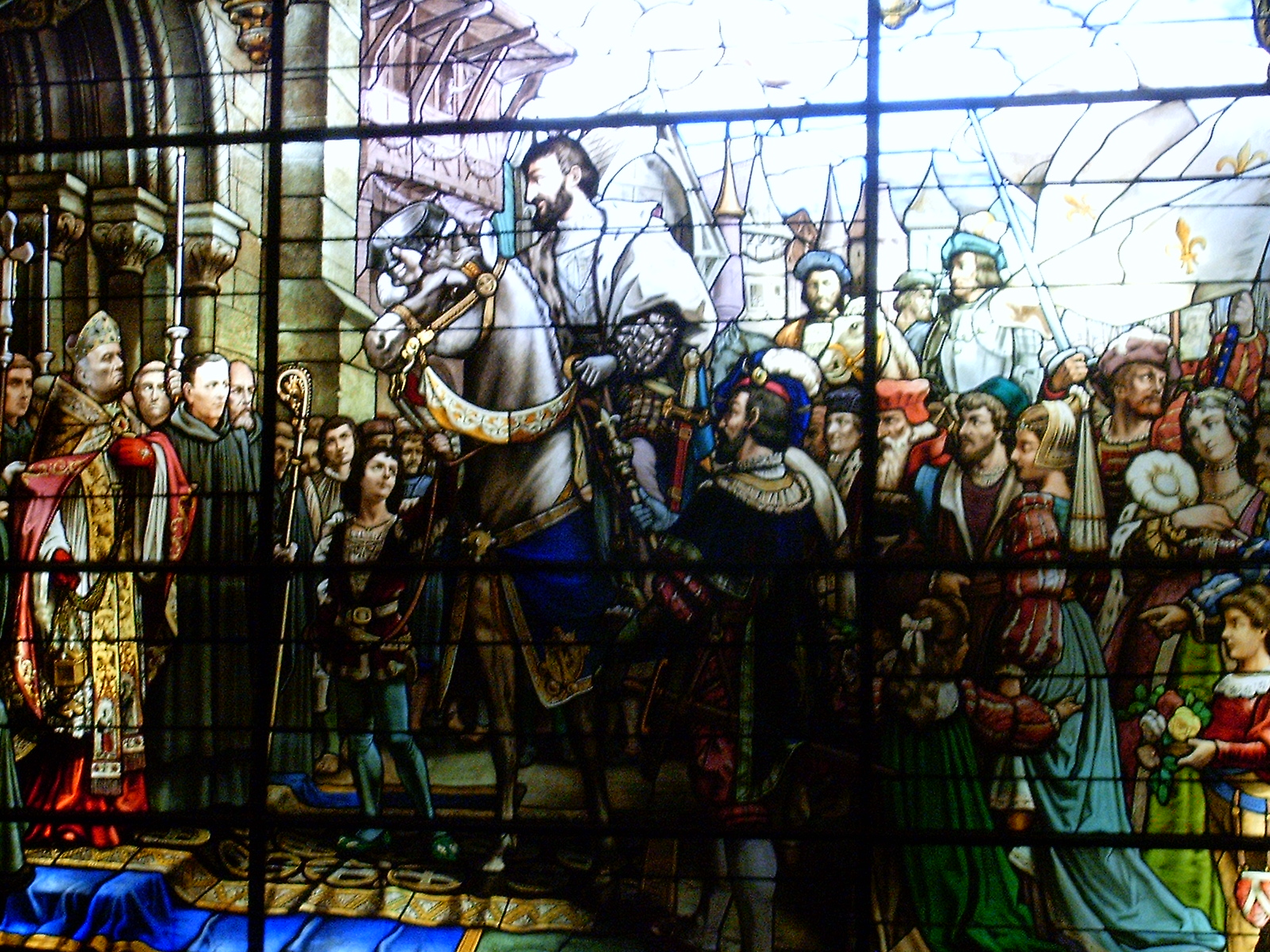
The legendary visit of Francis I to Fécamp.

Some sources record that a healthful elixir of 27 herbs and spices was concocted by one Dom Bernardo Vincelli, a Venetian Benedictine of the Renaissance period who was alleged to have stayed at the abbey of Fécamp. Still, there exists no concrete record of Vincelli's existence. Le Grand may have invented the mysterious monk to anchor his liqueur's origins in the Renaissance. According to legend, the liqueur first gained a reputation outside the abbey when Francis I, during a visit to Fécamp, tasted the elixir and was said to have exclaimed: "Foy de gentilhomme! Oncques n'en goustai de meilleur!" ("On my honor! I have never tasted anything better!") However, this story is more myth than history, as there is no record of Francis ever visiting Fécamp. Le Grand may have invented all these stories to buttress the popularity of his liqueur. The palace he would later construct would represent these stories in large stained glass windows.

Patiently Le Grand re-created the medicinal formula, marrying myrrh with juniper, saffron with lemon rind. The drink was sent to market in a distinctive bottle. But first, Le Grand played a new card: that of advertising. He persuaded several renowned artists to create posters and placards for placement in France and abroad. These artists included Alphonse Mucha, Sem, Lopes Silva, and even Louise Abbéma in 1899, with an oil-on-canvas titled La Renommée de la Bénédictine displayed at the Salon in 1899 and then at the World's Fair in Paris in 1900.

A decade after its launch, Bénédictine was selling 150,000 bottles per year. Its commercial success was so overwhelming that Le Grand, in 1876, founded Bénédictine SA, a company dedicated solely to the production of liqueurs. In 1882, the year of its entry into the Bourse, the enterprise opened a new distillery to boost its production from 350,000 bottles annually to almost a million, driven by the Second Empire fondness for liqueurs.

Le Grand demonstrated a marketing genius, deploying the precursors of corporate sponsorship and creating a legend about the brand. The brand was bolstered by Le Grand's acquisition of medieval collections in the Palais Bénédictine and his sponsorship of artists.

== The Palais Bénédictine ==
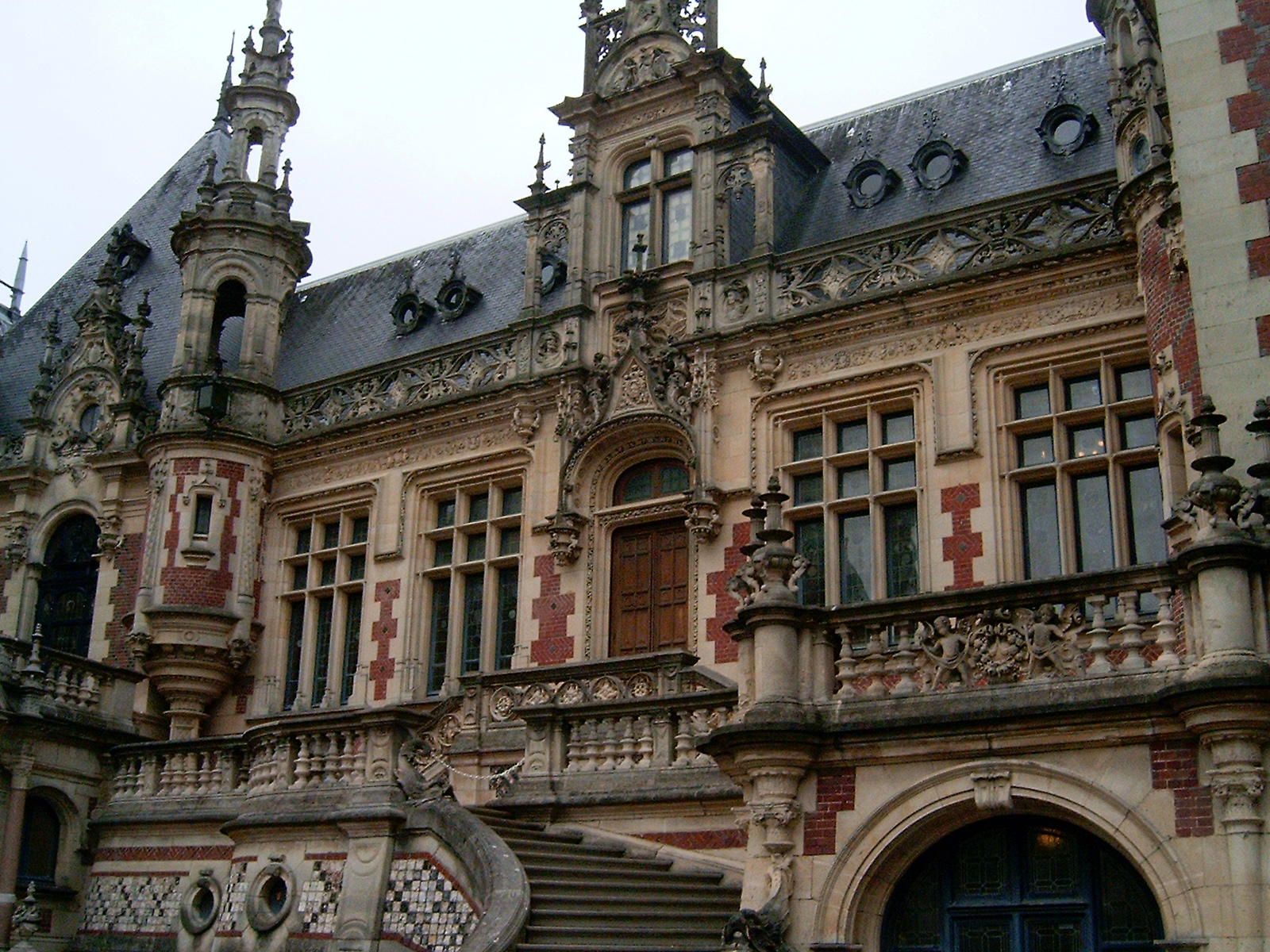
Detail of the Palais Bénédictine

An innovator, Le Grand imagined a distillery that could accommodate visitors wishing to watch the liqueur production. The distillery was opened to the public in 1873. A practicing Catholic and a follower of Catholic social doctrines, Le Grand founded a pension fund for his workers, practiced a paternalistic policy, and insured his workers against workplace accidents. In 1892. he founded an orphanage in Fécamp and a Bénédictine company orchestra (Harmonie).

An eclectic, Le Grand also brought together several collections of paintings, statues, pieces of metalwork, enamels, tapestries, ivories, coins, illuminated manuscripts, and stained glass. He housed this vast collection in a colossal palace-cum-factory – the Palais Bénédictine – built by Camille Albert, then architect of the city, a disciple of Viollet-le-Duc.

The Palais was opened in 1888 but was consumed in a massive fire on 12 January 1892. It was rebuilt in a form even more grandiose the following year. Before the second building was completed in 1900, Le Grand died; his children inaugurated the building. The building's finely wrought façade, dominated by spires and campaniles seemingly out of a Perrault fairy tale, enhances the prestige of the liqueur.

== The Château de Gruville ==
In 1876, architect Albert Camille built the Château de Gruville for Le Grand on an agricultural estate in Contremoulins. The house is asymmetrical, in block plan, using heterogeneous materials: brick, timber frame, slate, etc. Albert modified it in 1911 (adding a grand staircase) and 1923 (adding a gallery). The centerpiece of the estate, the château, was surrounded by a model farm and by water towers resembling crenellations, constructed between 1886 and 1888.

Le Grand's passion for his model farm caused it to become practically a second business for him. He transformed 160 acres (0.65 km^{2}) of forest into pastures and into fields of wheat, oats, rape, and beets, and he contributed to the betterment of Norman cattle stock – his cattle twice won prix d'honneur at the general concourse in Paris.
