= Robert Scott Burn =

Scottish engineer and writer

Robert Scott Burn (14 February 1825 – 31 January 1901) was a Scottish engineer and author, known as prolific writer between 1850 and 1860 on a wide range of subjects ranging from agriculture, building construction and mechanical engineering to architectural and technical drawing.

== Biography ==
Born at Lauder in the Scottish Borders, Burn received his education as engineer as apprentice at Watson, Ross and Co. in Edinburgh, who were working as agricultural and brewing engineers. After working at the Main Point Foundry in Edinburgh, he visited the United States. Back in the United Kingdom he settled in Stockport as consulting agricultural engineer.

Late 1840s Burn came into prominence with some technical innovations. He developed an improved roller gin, used in separating the seed from cotton, and made some improvements to steam engines. In the 1850s Burn wrote and edited a series of books on engineering and drawing, starting with Practical ventilation as applied to public, domestic, and agricultural structures. Main works he further edited, were The Illustrated Drawing Book and Practical Geometry in 1853, The steam engine; its history and mechanism in 1854. Burn moved to Castle Farm in Cheshire.

Late 1850s Burn also started writing for the Journal of Agriculture. He visited Belgium and Holland on three occasions, in 1859, 1860, and 1862, where he examined the peculiarities of the agriculture of the country. He published his findings in the 1862 Notes of an Agricultural Tour in Belgium, Holland, & the Rhine, and later wrote more works in the field of agriculture. He was a proponent of the idea of a "great extension of small farms in England as a means of improving our agriculture or the well-being of our population."

Burn continued to write on the wide-ranging from agriculture, building construction and mechanical engineering to architectural and technical drawing. He specialised in both in textbooks for students, and in "instructions for self-teaching of artistic and mechanical subjects." Some of his works were translated into German, and one drawing manual was even translated into Japanese. His The Illustrated Drawing Book was translated in Japanese, entitled Seiga Shinan [Guide to Western Pictures] (1871), was even the first drawing textbook in Japan.

In 1881 Burn had become a member of the Institution of Mechanical Engineers. In the same year he was also elected a member of the Iron and Steel Institute. In 1901 Burn died at the age of seventy-sixth in his residence in Edinburgh from bronchitis, from which he had been suffering for years.

== Work ==
=== The Illustrated London Drawing Book, 1852 ===
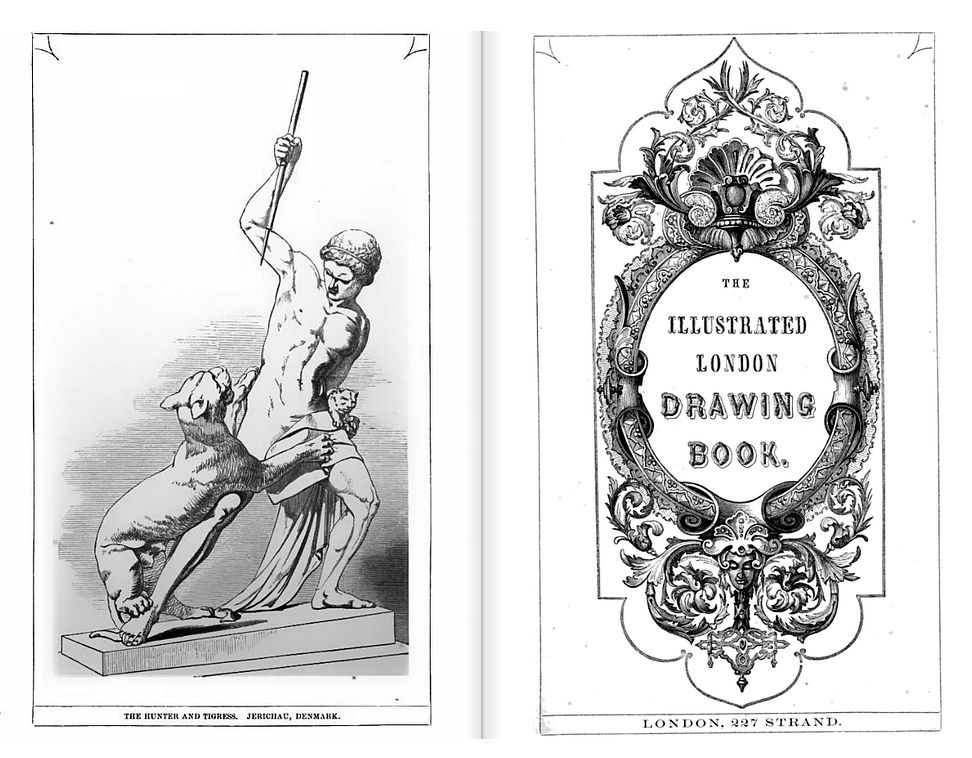
The Illustrated London Drawing Book, 1852

In the preface Burn explained, that Art has long been neglected in the educational system. "Drawing has been generally looked upon as an accomplishment," Burn said," not considered as an essential – as ornamental rather than indispensable in the education of the rising of generation."

Burn stipulated that "so far from looking upon a knowledge of the art of drawing as necessary merely to the artist or designer, we hold that it should form an essential part of general education – that its proper place is in the daily school, that its principles and practice should be inculcated in the daily lessons; in short, that equally with reading or writing, so should drawing be deemed one of the branches of every-day tuition..."

Another attitude toward drawing education was required, according to Burn: "A knowledge of drawing is generally imparted by a course of irregular and desultory lessons, aided by a laborious practice, dependent more upon empirical rules than fixed and certain principles. We are aware that there are many honourable exceptions to this rule; but few, we think, will be disposed to deny that it is the rule. On the supposition that the pupil at the outset is utterly ignorant of the art, we commence our instructions by elucidating."

There are principles underlying all drawing. According to Burn the first principle is:

As all drawings are reducible to certain lines and figures, we hold it necessary to enable the student to draw these elementary parts with the utmost facility; leading him by a series of examples from the drawing of a simple line, up to the most complicated sketch or object which may be offered to him; and then, by an advance to the more intricate rules, making plain the laws of vision (the foundation of perspective), so as to delineate correctly the various views in which they may be presented to his notice: the aim of the introductory lessons being to enable the student thoroughly to understand the reason why every operation is performed as directed, not merely to give him a facility for copying any determined object without reference to principles.

=== Practical Geometry, 1853 ===
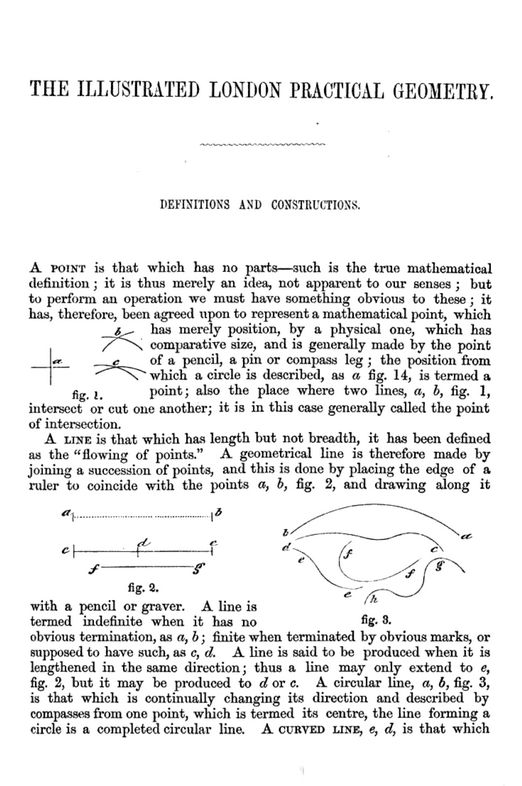
Practical Geometry, 1853, p. 1

The full title of this work is The Illustrated London Practical Geometry: And Its Application to Architectural Drawing; for the Use of Schools and Students, published by Ingram, Cooke, and Company in 1853. In this work Burn goes on describing the basics of all drawing:

"Practical Geometry is the basis of all drawing. As the combination of lines and curves of the various letters form the foundation of written language, so the like combinations in geometrical construction form, we conceive, the foundation of the art of general drawing in all its branches. We do not insist so much on the fact, that the Unes and figures known as geometrical, are to be found more or less strongly indicated in all the varied and graceful forms scattered before us—floating in the air—waving in the trees—adding beauty to the rich landscape, or mirrored in our glassy ponds; but we would rather impress upon the mind of the reader the importance of the truth, that a knowledge of Geometry is essentially requisite before an acquaintance with accurate drawing is attainable."

Looking back in his later work The illustrated architectural, engineering, & mechanical drawing-book Burn (1856) summarised, that the work in Practical Geometry gave "simple definitions and constructions of the various forms and figures which may be said to constitute the foundation of all drawing." He further explained:

"We have there endeavoured to show that a knowledge of geometrical construction is necessary, before a thorough appreciation of the principles of outline sketching can be obtained, and a ready facility acquired in performing its operations. However much this position may be controverted as regards its application to an art which is generally looked upon as independent of, rather than dependent on, strict and formal rules, there can be no doubt, we think, that it holds with all completeness in reference to that which it is now our duty to illustrate and describe. In fact, so much do the various branches treated of in the following pages depend upon a knowledge of geometry, that many class them under the generic title of "geometrical drawing." Those commencing the study of these arts – so useful to the architect and the mechanic – without this knowledge of geometry, will be disappointed as to their speedy proficiency, and will labour under great disadvantages, from not understanding the principles upon which the constructions are founded."

=== Mechanics and mechanism, 1853 ===
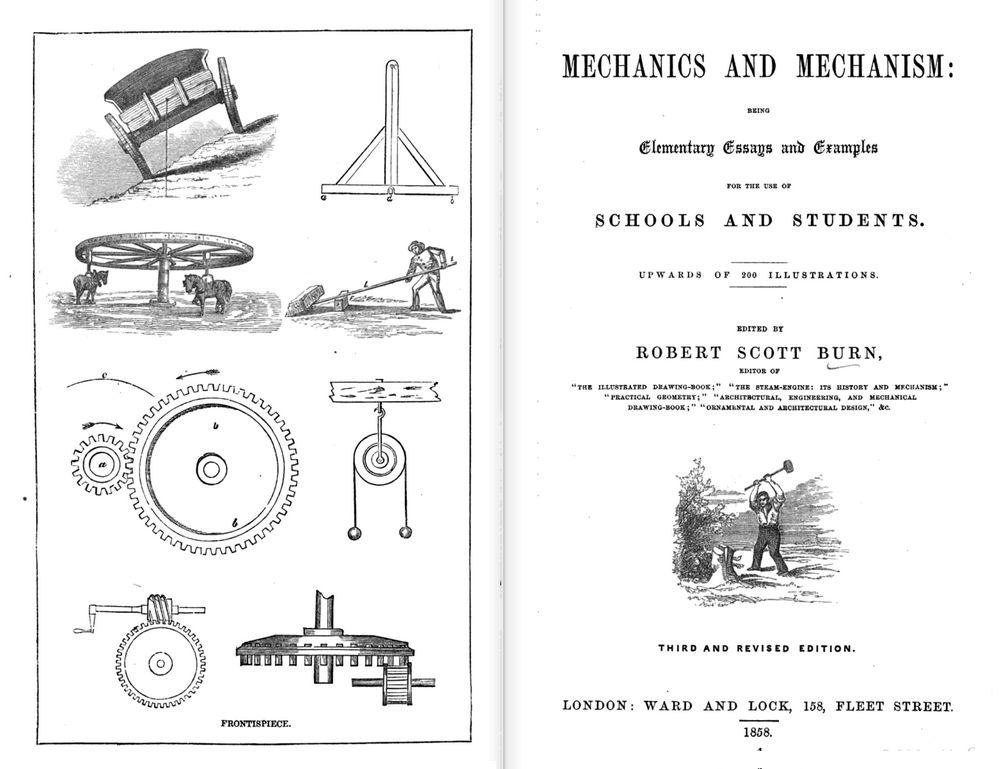
Mechanics and mechanism, title page, 1853

The 1853 Mechanics and Mechanism, is an illustrated educational work on mechanics and mechanism, published as part of the publishers Popular Educational Series. About the importance of this work, Burn explained in the preface of the first edition, citing himself from elsewhere:

"Mechanicians—and mechanism, the emanations of their genius — occupy an important position in our social and commercial system. It is now scarcely, if at all, an exaggeration to affirm that, to the improvements recently effected in the various branches of the mechanical arts we owe our present position as a nation. The steam-engine, and the powers it gave us, enabled us to cope successfully with the otherwise overwhelming disadvantages which a long and expensive war entailed upon us. To mechanism we owe the factories from which we send out our cloths to supply the world's markets; to mechanism we owe that giant power which, with equal facility, propels our ships in the ocean storm, as in the calm waters of our inland rivers. It is mechanism, well arranged and modified, which whirls the traveller along the iron way with an untiring speed which the swiftest race-horse bred by man can never rival; it is mechanism, finely constituted and cunningly devised, which forms the plainly useful as well as the beautifully elegant of our numerous and varied fabrics; in fact and in short, there is scarcely an article we use but what owes its production to one of the many combinations of mechanism. Nothing to the accomplished mechanician comes amiss; constructing the simple mechanism which effects a single purpose with ease, he as freely masters that which is imitative of operations which, apparently, nothing less than human skill could execute or human brains dictate. No matter what the operation to be effected : let it be complex in its details, to a degree stultifying to an ordinary mind, no sooner is it required than machinery is devised and set to work; and the operation is effected apparently with as much ease as the forms are made which constitute written language by the pen of the ready writer, or the throwing of the shuttle in the weaver's hand-loom."

Within one year a second edition was published. A review of this second edition of in the newspaper Derby Mercury stated:

One of the best-considered and most judiciously-illustrated elementary treatises on mechanics and mechanism which we have met with. The illustrations, diagrams, and explanations are skilfully introduced, and happily apposite; numerous, and beautifully executed. As a hand-book for the instruction of youth, it would be difficult to surpass it.

== Legacy ==
In the early 20th century, Burn was remembered as "author of a large number of technical handbooks, some of which maintained a steady sale during the last thirty-five years. The subjects dealt with included mechanics and mechanism, the steam-engine, building construction, and various branches of agriculture. He also wrote several works of a religious character, some of which were issued through the Religious Tract Society."

According to Mervyn Romans (2005), Robert Scott Burn and William S. Binns are considered the two most popular and influential writers of technical manuals in the Victorian Age. Especially Burn's The illustrated London drawing book and Mechanics and mechanism stayed in print for over 40 years.

In the late 19th century according to Romans (2005) the "increased demand for technical manuals reflects a fundamental shift in the way instruction in drawing was already moving away from being strictly the preserve of artists, towards a wider role in scientific and vocational education as well."

== Selected publications ==
=== 1850s ===
- Robert Scott Burn. Practical ventilation as applied to public, domestic, and agricultural structures, 1850
- Robert Scott Burn. The illustrated London drawing book, 1852
- Robert Scott Burn. eds. Mechanics and mechanism: being elementary essays and examples for the use of schools, students, and artisans. London, Ingram, Cooke, and co., 1853, 1858.
- Robert Scott Burn. The Illustrated Drawing Book, for the use of Schools, Students, and Artisans, containing Pencil Drawing, Figure and Art, Perspective Engraving, 1853, 1857
- Robert Scott Burn. The Illustrated London Practical Geometry: And Its Application to Architectural Drawing; for the Use of Schools and Students. Ingram, Cooke, and Company, 1853
- Robert Scott Burn. The colonist's and emigrant's handbook of the mechanical arts. William Blackwood and Sons, 1854
- Robert Scott Burn. The steam engine; its history and mechanism: being descriptions and illustrations of the stationary, locomotive, and marine engine. For the use of schools and students, London H. Ingram, 1854.
- Robert Scott Burn. The illustrated architectural, engineering, & mechanical drawing-book, London : Ward and Lock, 1856.
- Robert Scott Burn. Ornamental drawing, and architectural design, 1857
- James Slight, Robert Scott Burn. The Book of Farm Implements & Machines, William Blackwood, 1858

=== 1860s and later ===
- Robert Scott Burn. The book of farm-buildings; their arrangement and construction, Edinburgh, London : W. Blackwood and sons, 1861.
- Robert Scott Burn. Notes of an Agricultural Tour in Belgium, Holland, & the Rhine. Longman, Green, Longman, Roberts, & Green, 1862
- Robert Scott Burn. The grammar of house planning : hints on arranging and modifying plans of cottages, street-houses, farm-houses, villas, mansions, and out-buildings, Edinburgh : A. Fullarton 1864.
- Robert Scott Burn. Outlines of modern farming, Virtue Bros, 1865.
- Robert Scott Burn. Soils, manures, and crops, Edinburgh, A. Fullarton, 1869.
- Robert Scott Burn. Building construction, showing the employment of timber, lead, and iron work, in the practical construction of buildings, London, W. Collins, 1877.
- John Donaldson, Robert Scott Burn. Suburban farming. With additions by R.S. Burn. 1877
- Robert Scott Burn.Outlines of Landed Estates Management, London: Crosby, 1877
- Robert Scott Burn. Practical architecture as applied to farm buildings, after 1877
- Robert Scott Burn. Practical directory for the improvement of landed property 1888
- Robert Scott Burn (eds.). The Technical Student's Introduction to Mechanics, Ward, Lock, Bowden, and co, 1892.
