= Bob Burns (cricketer) =

New Zealand cricketer (1900–1993)

Personal information
- Full name: Robert Crosbie Burns
- Born: 24 June 1900; Templeton, Canterbury, New Zealand
- Died: 10 August 1993 (aged 93); Christchurch, New Zealand
- Nickname: Kuku, Cooker
- Batting: Right-handed
- Role: Wicketkeeper

Domestic team information
- Years: Team
- 1928–29 to 1933–34: Canterbury

Career statistics
| Competition | First-class |
|---|---|
| Matches | 15 |
| Runs scored | 176 |
| Batting average | 9.77 |
| 100s/50s | 0/0 |
| Top score | 27 |
| Balls bowled | 0 |
| Wickets | – |
| Bowling average | – |
| 5 wickets in innings | – |
| 10 wickets in match | – |
| Best bowling | – |
| Catches/stumpings | 14/17 |
- Source: Cricinfo, 9 June 2019

Robert Crosbie Burns (24 June 1900 – 10 August 1993) was a New Zealand cricketer who played first-class cricket for Canterbury between 1928 and 1934.

Burns was a wicket-keeper. In Canterbury's match against Otago in the 1928–29 Plunket Shield he made five stumpings, all of them off the bowling of Bill Merritt. He served on the committee of the Canterbury Cricket Association for many years before he moved to Auckland in 1939.

Burns worked in insurance. He served in the New Zealand Army in World War II as a private. At the time of his death at the age of 93 he was New Zealand's oldest first-class cricketer.
