= Jeff Tallon =

New Zealand physicist

Jeff Tallon CNZM
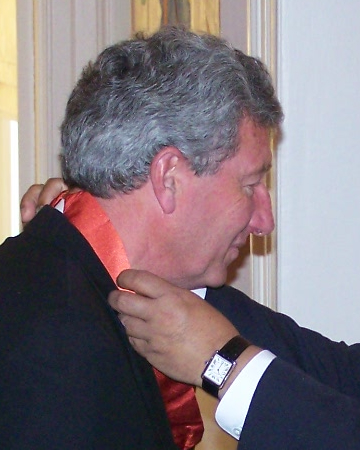
- Investiture of Jeff Tallon as CNZM, 2009
- Born: Jeffery Lewis Tallon; 18 December 1948 (age 77); Hamilton, New Zealand
- Education: Victoria University of Wellington
- Known for: Superconductivity research
- Awards: Hector Medal (1998); Rutherford Medal (2002)
- Scientific career
- Fields: Physics
- Workplaces: Victoria University of Wellington; Callaghan Innovation
- Thesis: Premelting and the mechanisms of melting in the alkali halides (1976)
- Doctoral advisor: Stuart Smedley; Bill Robinson

Jeffery Lewis Tallon CNZM (born 1948) is a New Zealand physicist specialising in high-temperature superconductors.

== Early life and education ==
Tallon was born in Hamilton on 17 December 1948, the son of Phyllis Blanche Tallon (née Currie) and George Frederick Tallon. He grew up in Mount Albert, and was educated at Gladstone Primary School, and later Mount Albert Grammar School in Auckland from 1962 to 1966. After a BSc(Hons) at the University of Auckland, he undertook doctoral studies at Victoria University of Wellington under Stuart Smedley and Bill Robinson, completing his PhD in chemistry in 1976.

In 1971, Tallon married Mary Elaine Turner, and the couple went on to have three children.

== Academic career ==
He was awarded a Doctor of Science by Victoria University of Wellington in 1996, on the basis of a selection of published papers.

== Honours and awards ==
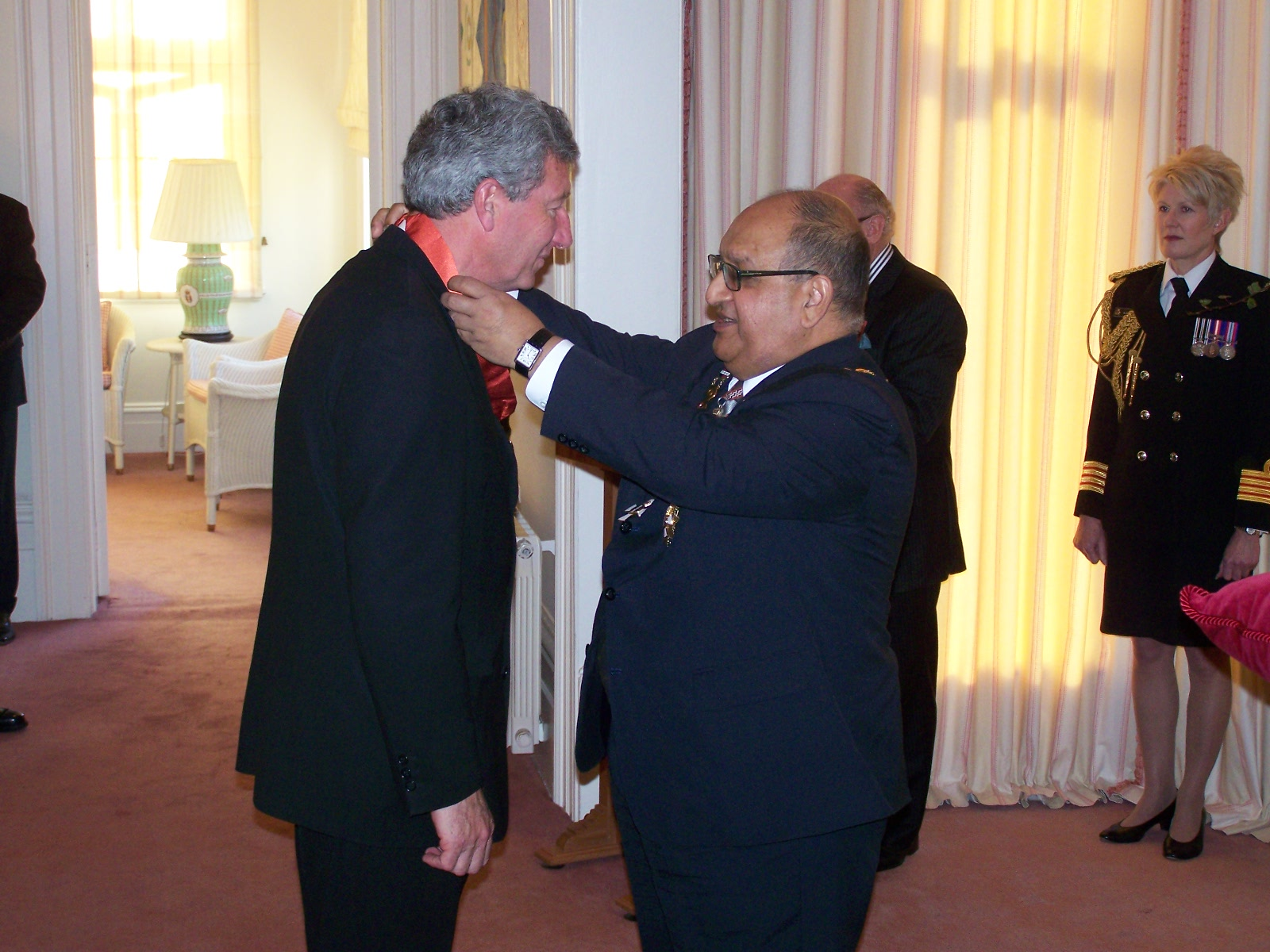
Investiture of Tallon as a Companion of the New Zealand Order of Merit by the governor-general, Sir Anand Satyanand, at Premier House on 2 September 2009

In 1990, Tallon was awarded the Mechaelis Medal for physics research. He was elected a Fellow of the Royal Society of New Zealand in 1993, and in 1998 he won the society's Hector Medal jointly with Paul Callaghan. In 2002, Tallon was awarded the Rutherford Medal, the highest award in New Zealand science. In 2011 Tallon was awarded the Dan Walls Medal by the New Zealand Institute of Physics.

In 1990, Tallon received the New Zealand 1990 Commemoration Medal. In the 2009 Queen's Birthday Honours, he was appointed a Companion of the New Zealand Order of Merit, for services to science.
