= Warren Tate =

New Zealand biochemist and researcher

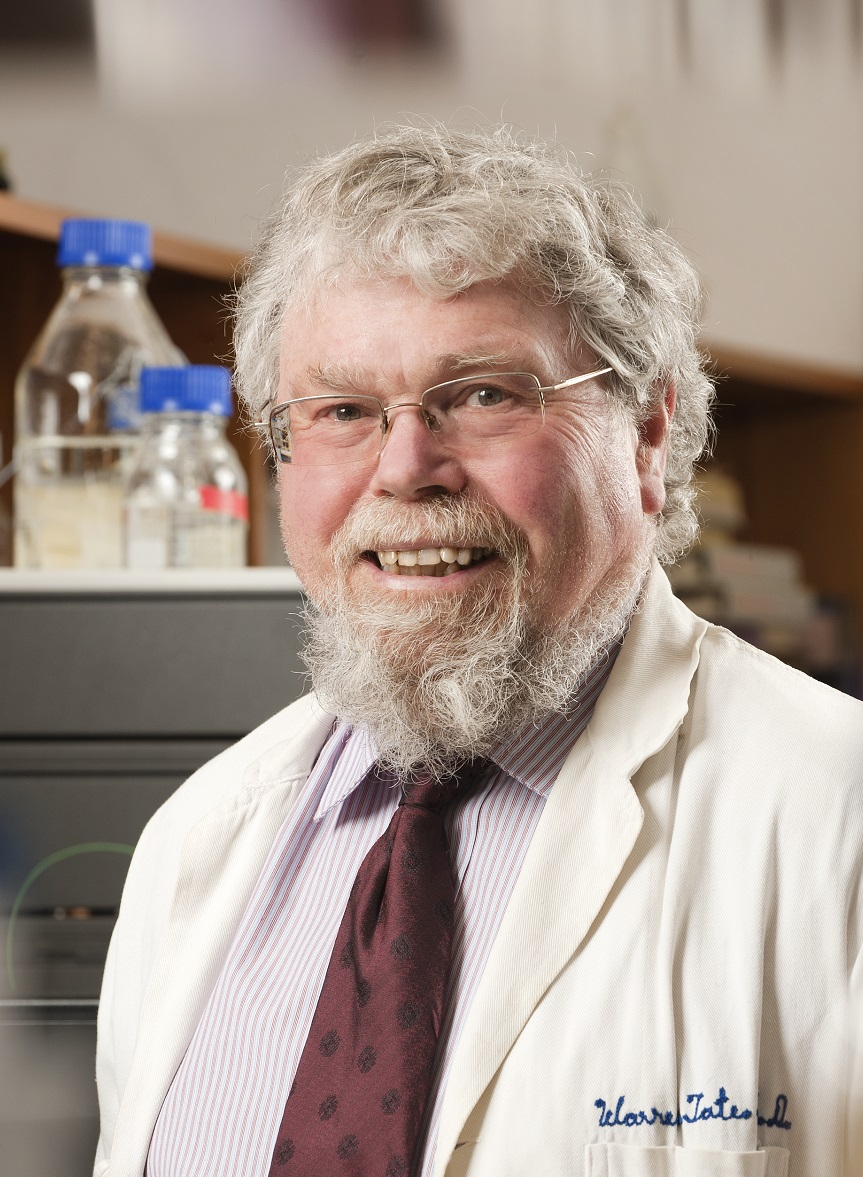
Tate in 2012

Warren Perry Tate CNZM (born 1945 or 1946) is a New Zealand biochemist and professor of biochemistry at the University of Otago.

== Early life ==
Born in 1945 or 1946, Tate grew up in Petone and was educated at Hutt Valley High School and Victoria University of Wellington.

== Research ==
Tate has been interested in protein synthesis for a long time. Particularly, the decoding and recoding of mechanisms on the ribosome at stop signals.

As well as molecular biology research, he is also involved in molecular neurobiology. Along with two of his University of Otago colleagues Cliff Abraham and Joanna Williams, they are looking at the mechanisms of neurological diseases such as Alzheimer's disease. In 2016, Tate and other researchers at the University of Otago discovered a promising new marker among a small number of molecules of microRNA. This means that Alzheimer's could be diagnosed by a simple blood test in future.

In 2013, Warren Tate and PhD student Angus Mackay received funding from the Lottery Health Research grants which uplifted their hopes of finding a diagnostic blood test for chronic fatigue syndrome, also known as myalgic encephalomyelitis, and once called Tapanui flu.

== Honours and awards ==
- 1990: Elected a Fellow of the Royal Society of New Zealand.
- 2010: Rutherford Medal. Warren was recognised "for his outstanding achievements in molecular biology and molecular neuroscience."
- 2011: Named as a Companion of the New Zealand Order of Merit, for services to science, in the 2011 Queen's Birthday Honours.
- 2018: Marsden Medal awarded by the New Zealand Association of Scientists for his "internationally recognised research discoveries in molecular biology and human disease, and his collaborative research". This same medal was won by his brother Kevin Tate in 2005.
