= Guillaume De Bo =

Belgian chemist

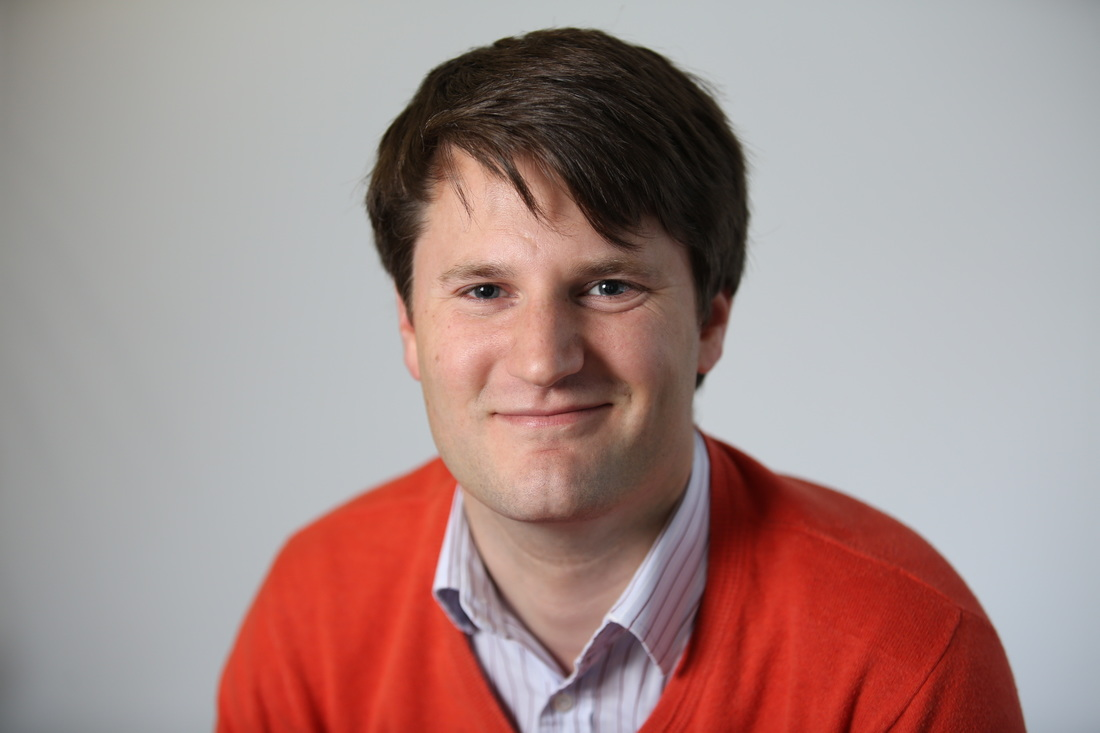
- Guillaume De Bo
- Born: Guillaume De Bo; Brussels, Belgium
- Education: University of Louvain (Msc., PhD)
- Known for: Polymer mechanochemistry Molecular Machines
- Awards: Bob Hay Lectureship (2021); Macro Group UK Young Researchers Medal (2021); Royal Society University Research Fellowship (2015)
- Scientific career
- Fields: mechanochemistry
- Workplaces: University of Manchester
- Thesis: Synthesis of angular triquinanes (2009)
- Doctoral advisor: Prof. István E. Markó
- Website: www.deboresearchgroup.com

Guillaume De Bo is a professor and a Royal Society University Research Fellow in the Department of Chemistry at the University of Manchester. His research is in the field of polymer mechanochemistry, where he investigates the chemistry of molecules under tension for application in synthetic chemistry, materials and mechanosensors.

== Education ==
Guillaume completed his Master of Science degree at University of Louvain in 2004 where he finished his final year project with Prof. István E. Markó on the development of platinum-based catalysts for the hydrosilylation of alkynes. He continued to complete his PhD with Prof. István E. Markó on the synthesis of angular triquinanes at the same university and successfully completed it in 2009.

== Research and career ==
Guillaume completed his postdoctoral research with Prof. Jean-François Gohy and Prof. Charles-André Fustin at University of Louvain where he worked on the assembly of mechanically linked block copolymers. In 2011, he joined Prof. David Leigh's research group at The University of Edinburgh to work on the development of molecular machines. He then joined the University of Manchester after obtaining a Royal Society University Research Fellowship in 2016.

Guillaume's research is in the field of polymer mechanochemistry, where he investigates the chemistry of molecules under tension for application in synthetic chemistry, materials and mechanosensors. He is also a committee member of the Royal Society of Chemistry Macrocyclic and Supramolecular Chemistry Group, and worked as the secretary of the Recent Appointees in Polymer Science Committee from 2014 - 2017. He was a guest editor in a Supramolecular Chemistry Special Issue on Emerging Supramolecular Chemistry in the UK (2017–2018) and worked as the next - generation adviser for Chem (cell press) during 2016 - 2019.

=== Notable work ===
In 2020, Guillaume showed that the dissociation of a mechanophore built around an N-heterocyclic carbene precursor proceeds with the rupture of a C–C bond through concomitant heterolytic, concerted and homolytic pathways using ^{1}H- and ^{19}F-nuclear magnetic resonance spectroscopy in combination with deuterium labelling. Normally, a chemical reaction occurs via a radical, concerted or ionic mechanism and transformations such as this where all these mechanisms are involved is extremely rare. The research discovered how molecular tuning influences mechanism which could be used in self-healing polymers or in plastics that break down upon mechanical activation. In the same year, Guillaume showed how the ability of the two rings in [2]catenane to rotate alone each other enables [2]catenane to be used as a mechanical protecting group via the diversion of technical forces away from a mechanically active functional group embedded in one of its rings. This approach showed a new way to control the mechanical activity of a mechanophore.

=== Awards, honours and nominations ===
- 2022: ERC Consolidator Grant
- 2021: Bob Hay Lectureship
- 2021: Macro Group UK Young Researcher Medal
- 2020: Outstanding Organic Tutor (Nominated)
- 2020: Thieme Chemistry Journals Award
- 2015: Royal Society University Research Fellowship

=== Major publications ===
- Chen, Lei; Nixon, Robert; De Bo, Guillaume (2024). "Force-controlled release of small molecules with a rotaxane actuator". Nature. 628: 320–325. doi:10.1038/s41586-024-07154-0. PMC 11006608.
- Suwada, Kamil; Ieong, Alice Weng; Lo, Hei Lok Herman; De Bo, Guillaume (2023). "Furan Release via Force-Promoted Retro-[4+2][3+2] Cycloaddition". J. Am. Chem. Soc. 143: 20782–20785. doi:10.1021/jacs.3c08771. PMC 10540202.
- Nixon, Robert; De Bo, Guillaume (2021). "Isotope Effect in the Activation of a Mechanophore". J. Am. Chem. Soc. 143: 3033–3036. doi:10.1021/jacs.0c11259.
- Nixon, Robert; De Bo, Guillaume (2020). "Three concomitant C–C dissociation pathways during the mechanical activation of an N-heterocyclic carbene precursor" (PDF). Nature Chemistry. 12 (9): 826–831. Bibcode:2020NatCh..12..826N. doi:10.1038/s41557-020-0509-1. PMID 32690898. S2CID 220656588.
- Zhang, Min; De Bo, Guillaume (2020). "A Catenane as a Mechanical Protecting Group". J. Am. Chem. Soc. 142 (11): 5029–5033. doi:10.1021/jacs.0c01757. PMID 32131588.
- Zhang, Min; De Bo, Guillaume (2019). "Mechanical Susceptibility of a Rotaxane". J. Am. Chem. Soc. 141: 15879–15883. doi:10.1021/jacs.9b06960.
- Zhang, Min; De Bo, Guillaume (2018). "Impact of a Mechanical Bond on the Activation of a Mechanophore". J. Am. Chem. Soc. 140 (10): 12724–12727. doi:10.1021/jacs.8b08590. PMID 30248265.
- Stevenson, Richard; De Bo, Guillaume (2017). "Controlling Reactivity by Geometry in Retro-Diels–Alder Reactions Under Tension". J. Am. Chem. Soc. 139: 16768–16771. doi:10.1021/jacs.7b08895.
