= Jennifer Adams =

Jennifer, Jenny, Jennie, Jenni, or Jen Adams or Addams may refer to:

- Jen Adams (born 1980), American lacrosse player and coach
- Jenni Adams (born 1970), New Zealand scientist
- Jennie Adams (born 1963), Australian romance writer
- Jenny Adams (born 1978), American track and field athlete
- Jenny Addams (1909–1980), Belgian fencer
