= Christine Winterbourn =

New Zealand pathologist

Christine Winterbourne CNZM FRSNZ
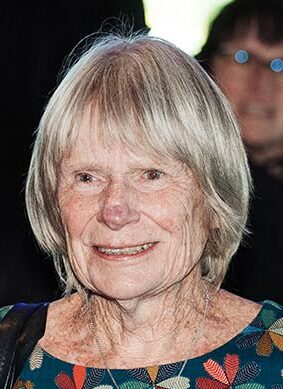
- Winterbourn in 2025
- Education: Massey University
- Known for: Research in biological chemistry of free radicals, first female recipient of the Rutherford Medal
- Awards: Rutherford Medal, Marsden Medal
- Scientific career
- Fields: Biochemistry
- Workplaces: University of Otago, Christchurch
- Thesis: Lipid metabolism of mammalian erythrocytes with special reference to cellular aging (1968)
- Doctoral advisor: Dick Batt

Christine Coe Winterbourn CNZM FRSNZ is a New Zealand biochemist. She is a professor of pathology at the University of Otago, Christchurch. Her research in the biological chemistry of free radicals earned her the 2011 Rutherford Medal and the Marsden Medal, the top awards from each of New Zealand's two top science bodies.

== Education ==
Winterbourn studied chemistry at the University of Auckland, followed by a PhD in biochemistry at Massey University. Her PhD thesis was an investigation of the lipid metabolism of mammalian erythrocytes, exploring changes in the lipid profiles in these cells as a function of the cells' age. She did postdoctoral work at the University of British Columbia, in Canada. Her career since then has been spent at the University of Otago, Christchurch, where she has a chair in the Pathology Department.

== Work ==
Winterbourn took a position at the University of Otago's Christchurch medical school in 1970. She set up her own laboratory in 1979/80, which grew into the Centre for Free Radical Research.

Her work explores the fundamental biochemistry of free radicals, which can have both beneficial and harmful effects in the body. She was one of the first scientists to demonstrate that human cells produce free radicals as part of their normal function. At low levels, they are essential to life, contribute to the body's defences against infection, and play a critical role in intracellular signalling. At higher levels, they can lead to oxidative stress, which has been implicated in a wide range of human diseases. Winterbourne did early work to document some of the chemical reactions of free radicals that occur in diseases such as cancer, stroke, coronary heart disease and arthritis.

== Honours ==
Winterbourne was the first female recipient of the Rutherford Medal and in 1988 was elected a Fellow of the Royal Society Te Apārangi. In the 1997 Queen's Birthday Honours, Winterbourn was appointed an Officer of the New Zealand Order of Merit, for services to medical research. She was promoted to Companion of the New Zealand Order of Merit in the 2012 Queen's Birthday and Diamond Jubilee Honours, for services to science. In 2017, Winterbourn was selected as one of the Royal Society Te Apārangi's "150 women in 150 words", celebrating the contributions of women to knowledge in New Zealand.
