= David L Wiltshire =

New Zealand theoretical physicist

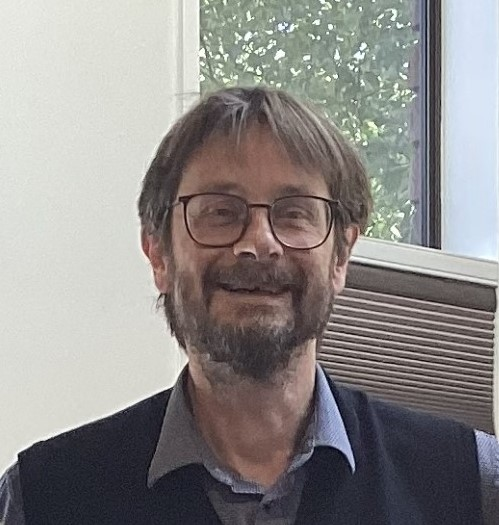
- Wiltshire in 2024
- Born: 5 May 1962 (age 64); New Plymouth, New Zealand
- Education: University of Canterbury (BSc (Hons); MSc); University of Cambridge (PhD)
- Awards: Dan Walls Medal (2023)
- Scientific career
- Fields: General relativity; Cosmology; Quantum gravity
- Workplaces: University of Canterbury
- Doctoral advisor: Gary Gibbons

David Lauri Wiltshire is a professor of theoretical physics at the University of Canterbury, in Christchurch, New Zealand, where he leads the Gravity and Cosmology Group.

== Career ==
Wiltshire completed undergraduate studies in physics and mathematics and an MSc at the University of Canterbury, Christchurch in 1983. In 1987, Wiltshire completed a PhD in theoretical physics at University of Cambridge, supervised by Gary Gibbons.

Following his PhD, Wiltshire held postdoctoral positions at the International Centre for Theoretical Physics in Trieste, Italy; the University of Newcastle upon Tyne, UK; and the University of Adelaide, South Australia, where he then began lecturing. In July 2001, he returned to the University of Canterbury to take up an academic position in the Department of Physics and Astronomy.

== Research ==
Wiltshire's research interests include general relativity, cosmology and quantum gravity.

Wiltshire is best known for the timescape cosmology. He reinterprets dark energy as a misidentification of gradients in gravitational energy in an inhomogeneous universe, in which the present epoch cosmic web is dominated by voids. His predictions about average cosmic expansion will be subject to precision tests including observations by the Euclid mission, the Dark Energy Survey, and the Dark Energy Spectroscopic Instrument (DESI).

On 19 December 2024, Wiltshire and colleagues announced the results of a new model-independent statistical analysis of the Pantheon+ Type Ia Supernova catalogue. They found that the timescape model fit the data better than the standard ΛCDM model at 99% confidence level, providing evidence for a foundational change to cosmological models.

== Awards ==
In 2023 Wiltshire was awarded the Dan Walls Medal by the New Zealand Institute of Physics.

== Books ==
- David L Wiltshire, Matt Visser & Susan Scott, The Kerr Spacetime: Rotating black holes in general relativity (2009) ISBN 978-0-521-88512-6
