= UGC 9684 =

Galaxy located in Boötes

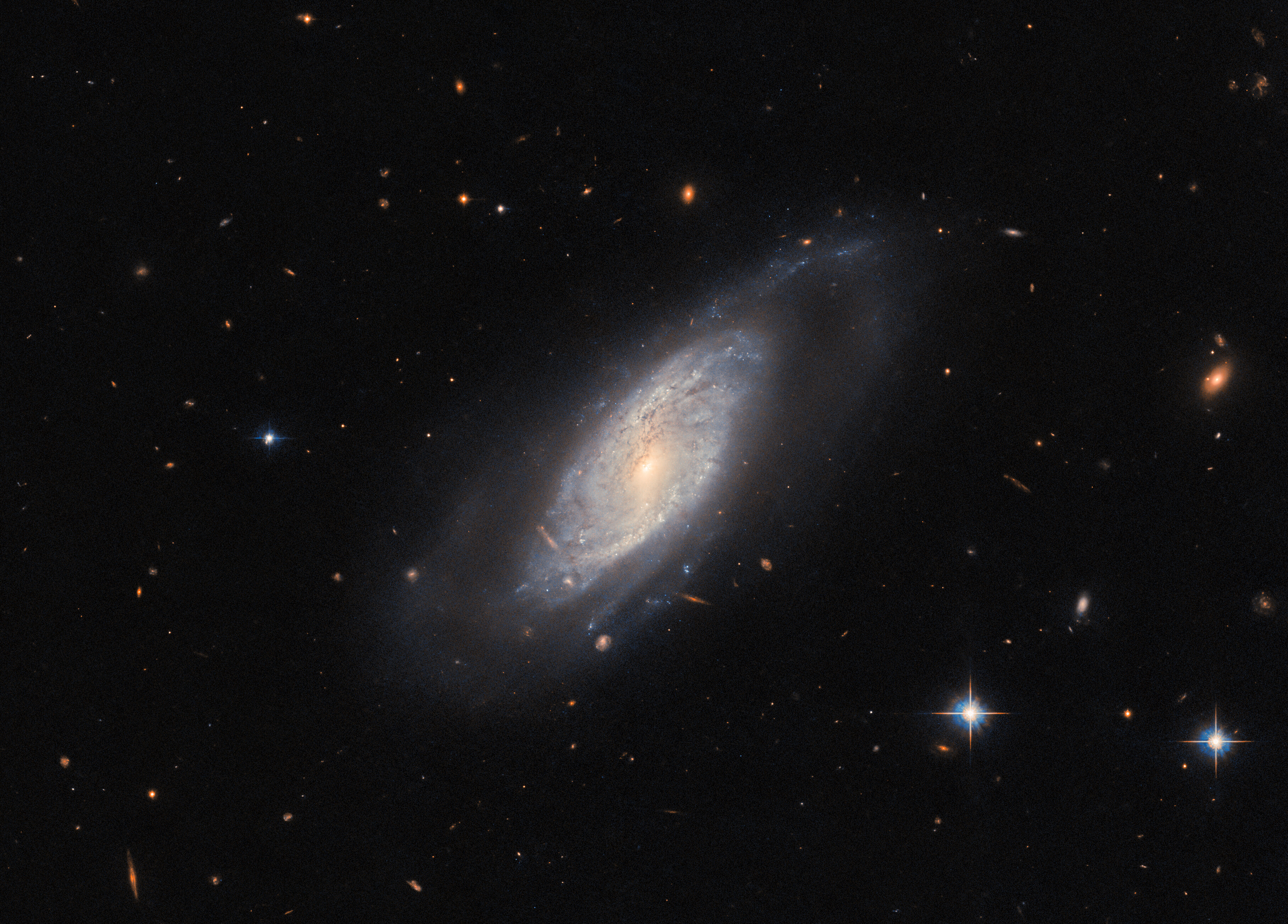
- UGC 9684 imaged by the Hubble Space Telescope

Observation data (J2000 epoch)
- Constellation: Boötes
- Right ascension: 15^{h} 03^{m} 50.4823^{s}
- Declination: +42° 06′ 55.748″
- Redshift: 0.016866
- Heliocentric radial velocity: 5,056 km/s
- Distance: 247 Mly (75.7 Mpc)
- Apparent magnitude (V): 14.4

Characteristics
- Type: SBab, Sab
- Size: 90,000 ly
- Apparent size (V): 1.35 x 0.56 arcmin

Other designations
- PGC 53758, ECO 04872, CGCG 221-023, MCG +07-31-024, 2MASX J15035050+4206556, 2MASS J15035049+4206554, SDSS J150350.47+420655.5, IRAS F15020+4218, UZC J150350.5+420655, LEDA 53758

UGC 9684 is a barred spiral galaxy with a ring structure in the constellation Boötes. It is located 250 million light-years from the Solar System and has an approximate diameter of 90,000 light-years.

The luminosity class of UGC 9684 is I–II and it is classified as an active star-forming galaxy according to a study published in 2022, in which produces one solar mass of stars every few years, with levels of stellar formation.

== Studying of star formation rate for UGC 9684 ==
Scientists who studied UGC 9684, have longed to find out the star-formation rate for UGC 9684. To do this, they used a Fitting and Assessment of Synthetic Templates code. The scientists used further observations via ultraviolet, both optical and near-infrared and from the luminosity measurements from different databases from GALEX, SDSS and from the final release of the MASS extended source catalog by Jarrett et al. 2000, with all the data retrieved from NASA/IPAC Extragalactic Database.

As for the star formation, they employed a decreasing function of (SFR ∝ e^{−t} ) and also a delayed function (SFR ∝ t × e^{−t} ) as well as the stellar population libraries written from Bruzual & Charlot and Convoy et al. Several metallicity estimates, published by Prieto et al. 2008, Kelly & Kirshner from 2012, whom the majority agreed, it is slightly above solar oxygen abundance 12+ log(O/H) ≈ 9.0 which corresponds to ~2 Z_{⊙}.

Scientists therefore found that the star-formation rate of UGC 9684 is 0.25–0.39 M_{☉} yr^{−1}. Apart from that, they found the total stellar mass for the galaxy is M⋆ = (2.0–3.5)×10^{10} M_{☉} which is a current specific rate sSFR ≈ 0.01 Gyr^{−1}. This is higher compared to literature but compatible to large number of recent events in UGC 9684.

== Supernovae ==
Three supernovae and one astronomical transient have been discovered in UGC 9684, making it one of the most active supernova-producing galaxies.

- SN 2006ed (Type II, mag. 19.0) was discovered on September 18, 2006, via unfiltered CCD images, by N. Joubert, D. R. Madison, R. Mostardi, H. Khandrika and W. Li from University of California, Berkeley on behalf of Lick Observatory Supernova Search program (LOSS). It was located 1".8 east and 7".2 south of the nucleus.
- SN 2012ib (Type Ib/c, mag. 16.0) was discovered on December 20, 2012, by amateur astronomer, V. Shumkov from Sternberg Astronomical Institute (SAI), on four 60-sec unfiltered images from the MASTER-Amur robotic telescope via a 0.40-m f/2.5 reflector. The supernova was located at 48".7 east and 0".4 south of the nucleus.
- AT 2017cgh (type unknown, mag. 17.74) was discovered on March 15, 2017, by Pan-STARRS1 Science consortium. It was located 0".0 east and 0".0 north of the nucleus. This astronomical transient was never officially classified as a supernova.
- SN 2020pni (Type II, mag. 19.8044) was discovered on July 16, 2020, by a team of astronomers on behalf of the ALeRCE broker via r-ZTF filters which was taken by a Palomar 1.2m Oachin telescope. It was located 5".7 west and 5".0 south of the nucleus. Its progenitor, a massive star, was enriched in helium and nitrogen in relative abundances in mass fractions of 0.30–0.40 and 8.2×10^{−3}, respectively. A first study shows 1 day after the discovery, there was a significant He II emission which had strong flash features. Another study shows during the 4 days after, there was an increase in velocity of hydrogen lines (from ~250 to ~1000 km/s) suggesting complex circumstellar medium (CSM). A presence of dense and confined CSM as well as its inhomogeneous structure, indicates a phrase of enhanced mass loss of the SN 2020pni progenitor a year before the explosion. As of 2023, the supernova has since faded from view.
