= Matt Visser =

New Zealand mathematician

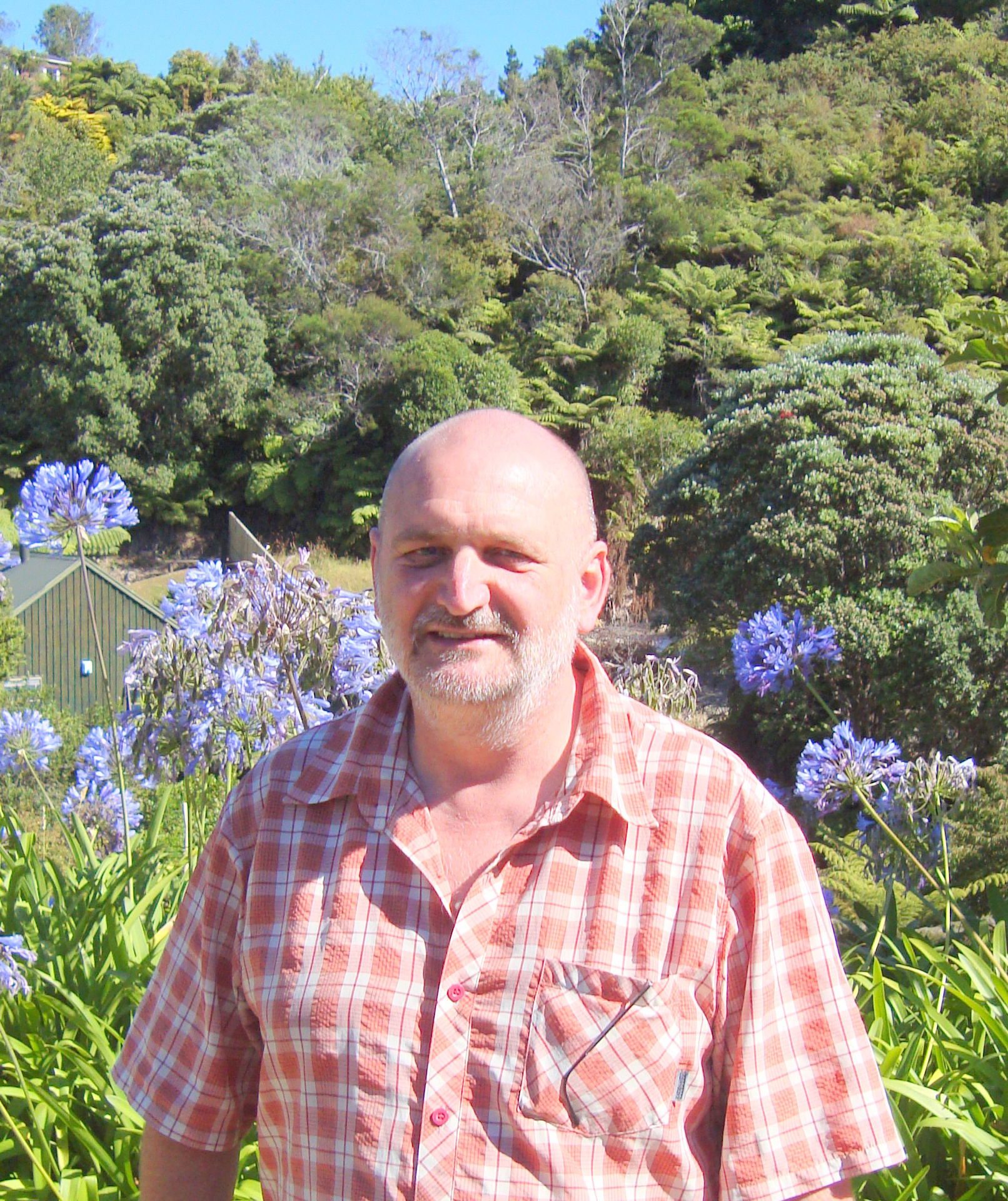
- Matt Visser, 2010
- Education: University of California, Berkeley (PhD)
- Awards: Dan Walls Medal (2013)
- Scientific career
- Fields: General relativity; Quantum field theory; Cosmology
- Institutions: Victoria University of Wellington
- Doctoral advisor: Mary K. Gaillard
- Notable students: Silke Weinfurtner

Matt Visser (FRSNZ) is a mathematics professor at Victoria University of Wellington, in New Zealand.

== Career ==
Visser completed a PhD at the University of California, Berkeley, supervised by Mary K. Gaillard.

Visser's research interests include general relativity, quantum field theory and cosmology.

Visser has produced a large number of research papers on the subject of wormholes, gravitational horizons and notably the emerging subject of acoustic metrics.

He is the author of the reference book on the current state of wormhole theory, Lorentzian Wormholes — from Einstein to Hawking (1996) and co-editor of Artificial Black Holes (2002).

== Awards ==
In 2013 Visser was awarded the Dan Walls Medal by the New Zealand Institute of Physics.

== Books ==
- David L Wiltshire, Matt Visser & Susan Scott, The Kerr Spacetime: Rotating black holes in general relativity (2009) ISBN 978-0-521-88512-6
- M Novello, Matt Visser & G E Volovik, Artificial Black Holes (2002) ISBN 978-981-02-4807-9
- Matt Visser, Lorentzian Wormholes: From Einstein To Hawking (1995) ISBN 978-1-56396-394-0

== See also ==
- Roman ring
