= Peter Schwerdtfeger =

German chemist (born 1955)

Peter A. Schwerdtfeger
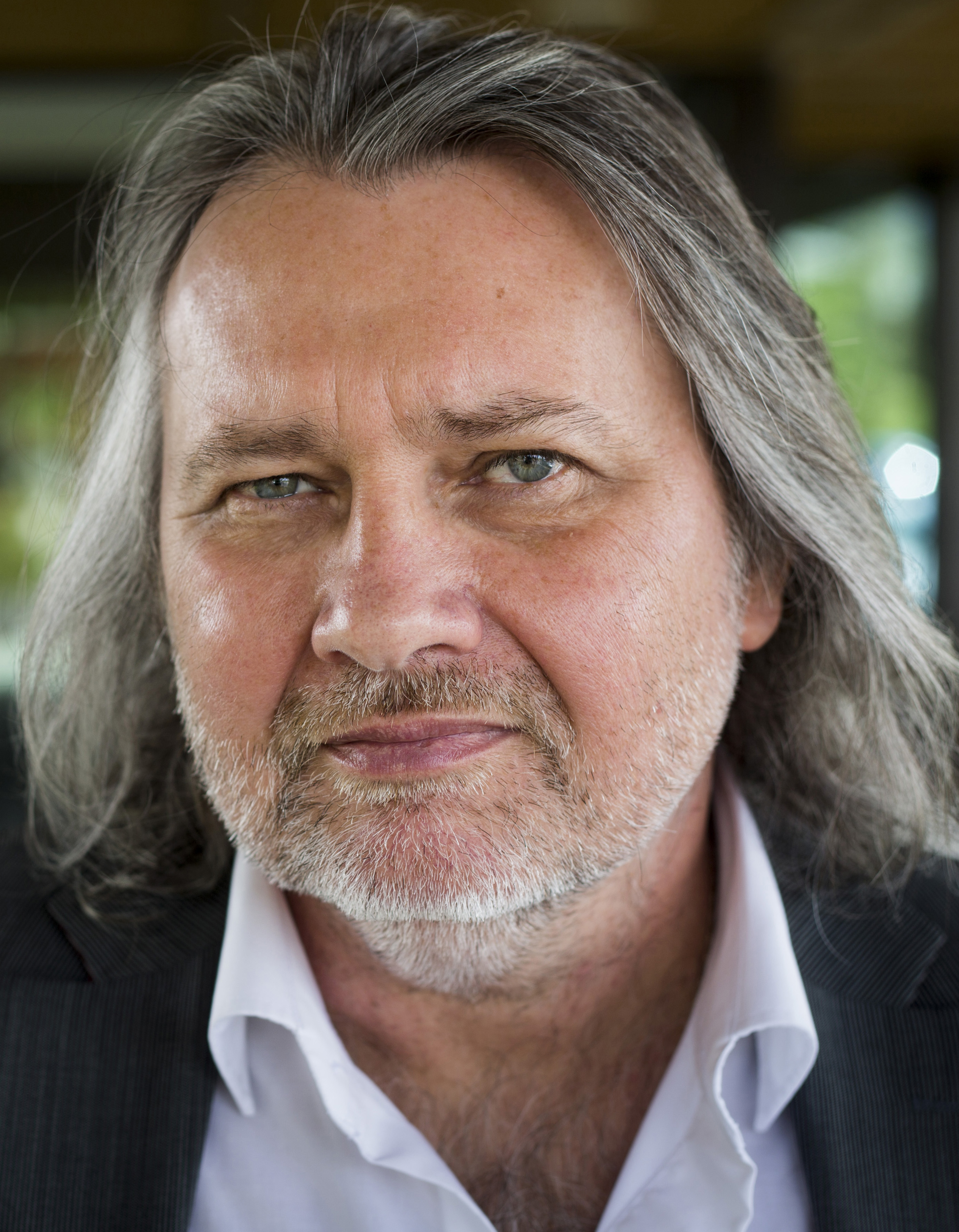
- Schwerdtfeger in 2014
- Born: 1 September 1955 (age 71); Stuttgart, West Germany
- Education: University of Stuttgart; Philipps University of Marburg
- Known for: Relativistic electronic structure theory; topology of fullerenes; physics beyond the Standard Model; heavy element chemistry
- Awards: Humboldt Research Award; Rutherford Medal; Fukui Medal; Hector Medal
- Scientific career
- Fields: Chemistry; physics; mathematics
- Workplaces: Massey University Auckland
- Doctoral advisor: Heinzwerner Preuß

Peter A. Schwerdtfeger (born 1 September 1955) is a German theoretical chemist based in New Zealand. He holds a chair in theoretical chemistry at Massey University (Albany, Auckland), is director of Massey's Centre for Theoretical Chemistry and Physics, and is head of the New Zealand Institute for Advanced Study (NZIAS). He was elected to the International Academy of Quantum Molecular Science in 2012 and received New Zealand's Rutherford Medal in 2014.

== Early life and education ==
Schwerdtfeger gained a qualification as a chemical-technical assistant at the Chemisches Institut Dr. Flad, Stuttgart, in 1973, and a chemical engineering degree from Aalen University of Applied Sciences in 1976. He studied chemistry, physics and mathematics at the University of Stuttgart, completing the Dr. rer. nat. (PhD) in theoretical chemistry in 1986. He received the Habilitation and venia legendi from the Philipps University of Marburg in 1995.

== Career ==
In 1987 he moved to New Zealand on a Feodor-Lynen fellowship of the Alexander von Humboldt Foundation to the University of Auckland. He held a research fellowship at the Research School of Chemistry, Australian National University (1989–1991), then returned to Auckland as lecturer (1991) and later personal chair (1999). In 2004 he was appointed to the chair in theoretical chemistry at Massey University (Albany) and founded the Centre for Theoretical Chemistry and Physics.

He has served as head of the NZIAS, and is listed as head of Institute on the NZIAS site. He was the Gunnar Källén Lecturer in Physics at Lund University in 2015 and previously undertook a Royal Society of Chemistry Australasian Lectureship tour in 2007.

From 2017 to 2018 he was associated with the Centre for Advanced Study (CAS) in Oslo through the project "Molecules in Extreme Environments," hosted by Trygve Helgaker.

Schwerdtfeger has authored hundreds of research papers in electronic-structure theory and heavy-element chemistry; his CV lists more than 380 publications.

== Fellowships and awards ==
Schwerdtfeger has received multiple national and international awards:

- 2001 James Cook Fellowship
- 2010 Humboldt Research Prize by the Humboldt Foundation
- 2011 Fukui Medal
- 2012 Fellow of the International Academy of Quantum Molecular Science.
- 2014 Royal Society of New Zealand's Rutherford Medal.
- 2019 Dan Walls Medal
- 2022 Foreign member of the Finnish Academy of Science and Letters
- 2026 Special issue of Molecular Physics published in his honour on the occasion of his 70th birthday.

== Selected publications ==
- Schwerdtfeger, P.; Heath, G.A.; Dolg, M.; Bennett, M.A. (1992). "Low Valencies and Periodic Trends in Heavy Element Chemistry. A Theoretical Study of Relativistic and Correlation Effects in Group 13 and Period 6 Hydrides and Fluorides". Journal of the American Chemical Society. 114: 7518. doi:10.1021/ja00045a027.
- Schwerdtfeger, P. (2003). "Gold Goes Nano – From Small Clusters to Low-Dimensional Assemblies". Angewandte Chemie International Edition. 42 (17): 1892–5. doi:10.1002/anie.200201610. PMID 12730967.
- Hermann, A.; Schmidt, W.G.; Schwerdtfeger, P. (2008). "Resolving the optical spectrum of water: Coordination and electrostatic effects". Physical Review Letters. 100 (20) 207403. Bibcode:2008PhRvL.100t7403H. doi:10.1103/PhysRevLett.100.207403. PMID 18518578.
- Schwerdtfeger, P. (2011). "The Pseudopotential Approximation in Electronic Structure Theory". ChemPhysChem. 2 (17): 3143–55. doi:10.1002/cphc.201100387. PMID 21809427.
- Hauser, A.; Schwerdtfeger, P. (2012). "Nanoporous graphene membranes for efficient 3He/4He separation". Journal of Physical Chemistry Letters. 3 (2): 209. doi:10.1021/jz201504k.
- Calvo, F.; Pahl, E.; Wormit, M.; Schwerdtfeger, P. (2013). "Evidence for low temperature melting of mercury owing to relativity". Angewandte Chemie International Edition. 52 (29): 7583–5. doi:10.1002/anie.201302742. PMID 23780699.
- Schwerdtfeger, P.; Wirz, L.; Avery, J. (2015). "The Topology of Fullerenes". Wiley Interdisciplinary Reviews: Computational Molecular Science. 5 (1): 96–145. doi:10.1002/wcms.1207. PMC 4313690. PMID 25678935.
- Pašteka, L.F.; Eliav, E.; Borschevsky, A.; Kaldor, U.; Schwerdtfeger, P. (2017). "Relativistic coupled cluster calculations with variational quantum electrodynamics resolve the discrepancy between experiment and theory concerning the electron affinity and ionization potential of gold". Physical Review Letters. 118 (2) 023002. Bibcode:2017PhRvL.118b3002P. doi:10.1103/PhysRevLett.118.023002. hdl:11370/cf4c829b-af25-49f8-b153-f6bc853893b3. PMID 28128629.
- Jerabek, P.; Schuetrumpf, B.; Schwerdtfeger, P.; Nazarewicz, W. (2018). "Electron and Nucleon Localization Functions in Superheavy Elements". Physical Review Letters. 120 (5) 053001. arXiv:1707.08710. doi:10.1103/PhysRevLett.120.053001. PMID 29481184.
- Giuliani, S. A.; Matheson, Z.; Nazarewicz, W.; Olsen, E.; Reinhard, P.-G.; Sadhukhan, J.; Schuetrumpf, B.; Schunck, N.; Schwerdtfeger, P. (2019). "Oganesson and beyond". Reviews of Modern Physics. 91 011001. doi:10.1103/RevModPhys.91.011001.
