= Margaret Reid (scientist) =

Australian physicist

- Born: Margaret Daphne Reid
- Scientific career
- Thesis: Squeezing and quantum effects in optics (1984)
- Doctoral advisor: Dan Walls

Margaret Daphne Reid FAA is an Australian physicist known for her pioneering work in new fundamental tests of quantum theory, including teleportation and cryptography. She is a professor at Swinburne University of Technology.

== Career ==
Reid graduated from the University of Auckland with a B.Sc. in 1978 and an M.Sc. in theoretical physics in 1980. She then undertook Ph.D. studies at Auckland University with Dan Walls FRS, graduating in 1984 with a doctoral thesis titled Squeezing and quantum effects in optics. She developed theories for the generation of squeezed states of light and quantum nondemolition measurement. Following several years as a lecturer at the University of Waikato, New Zealand, she was awarded an Australian QEII Fellowship to do research at the University of Queensland. She later became a researcher with the Australian Research Council Centre of Excellence in Quantum and Atom Optics at the University of Queensland. As of 2026, she is a distinguished professor at Swinburne University of Technology in Melbourne, and is the director of the Centre for Quantum Science and Technology Theory.

== Research ==
Reid's work has focused on the fundamental tests of quantum mechanics, including the Einstein-Podolsky-Rosen paradox and Bell's theorem, based on quantum optics effects such as parametric down conversion. Following work with squeezed states of light in the 1980s, Reid devised a test for quantum entanglement which amplified and detected the tiny quantum fluctuations of optical amplitudes. Experiments since have confirmed this mesoscopic type of entanglement in a range of environments, which enables a closer understanding of Schrödinger's cat.

In the 1990s, scientists realised one can securely transmit a message through encrypting and using a shared key generated by entanglement to decode the message from the sender and receiver. Using the quantum key meant the message was completely secure from interception during transmission. In a landmark publication, Reid's research group outlined Einstein's reservations about entanglement, a phenomenon he referred to as "'spooky' action at a distance". In this paper, a theoretical proof that such messages can be shared between more than two people and may provide unprecedented security for a future quantum internet, is provided for the first time.

Sending entanglement to a larger number of people means the key can be distributed among all the receiving parties, so they must collaborate to decipher the message, which makes the message even more secure. The report showed that a secure message can be shared by up to three to four people, opening the possibility to the theory being applicable to secure messages being sent from many too many. The message will also remain secure if the devices receiving the message have been tampered with, like if an iPhone were hacked, because of the nature of entanglement. Discovering that it can be applied to a situation with more parties has the potential to create a more secure Internet – with less messages being intercepted from external parties.

== Honours and awards ==
For Reid's contributions to the fields of quantum entanglement and non-locality, she was made a fellow of the Optical Society of America and a fellow of the American Physical Society. She was also awarded a visiting position at Harvard University and a JILA Fellowship at the University of Colorado in the USA.

- 2019, Moyal Medal, Macquarie University (first women physicist to receive the Moyal Medal)
- 2017, Fellow of the Australian Institute of Physics
- 2017, Fellow of the American Physical Society for "fundamental contributions to quantum information and quantum optics, in particular to tests of the Einstein–Podolsky–Rosen (EPR) paradox, EPR steering, optical Bell tests, and quantum squeezing."
- 2014, Fellow of the Australian Academy of Science
- 2007, Fellow of the Optical Society of America for "developing ways to test the fundamental concepts of nonlocality, squeezing, Einstein-Podolsky-Rosen paradoxes, entanglement, and macroscopic superpositions in quantum optical systems."
- 1994, Australian Research Council QE2 Fellowship

The Fellowship of the Australian Academy of Science (received in 2014) is a great accomplishment for any Australian scientist, but Reid sees it as further recognition for women scientists: "The idea that women are in any way inferior when it comes to doing physics or mathematics is a complete myth. Unfortunately, a big problem is that not all the great achievements made by the women physicists of the last century were properly recognised. But that has and will continue to change as more and more women are recognised for their contributions to science."
