= Paula Jameson =

New Zealand plant physiologist

Paula Jameson ONZM
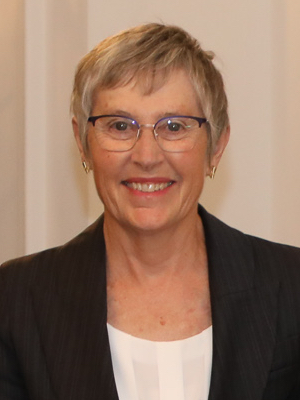
- Jameson in 2021
- Education: University of Canterbury
- Scientific career
- Fields: plant physiology, plant hormones
- Thesis: A study on the role of cytokinins in the development of starch accumulating structures. (1982)

Paula Elizabeth Jameson ONZM is a New Zealand plant physiologist.

== Biography ==
In 1982, Jameson was awarded a PhD from the University of Canterbury, with a thesis titled A study on the role of cytokinins in the development of starch accumulating structures. After working at the University of Otago and serving as head of department at Massey University, Jameson moved to the University of Canterbury. Jameson is a Fellow of the New Zealand Institute of Agricultural and Horticultural Science and a life member of the New Zealand Society of Plant Physiologists.

== Research ==
Jameson's work on the genetics of large-seed production has received international coverage. In the 1980s, Jameson gave evidence of her research findings in a controversial case involving the fertiliser Maxicrop. Fertiliser company Bell-Booth Ltd contended that Jameson was on the verge of a major breakthrough of great significance to New Zealand. However, Jameson's results were challenged by international scientists appearing for the Ministry of Agriculture and Forestry (New Zealand), who determined that the fertiliser would have to be applied at the rate of 98,000 litres/ha to elicit a response. The case was decided against the Ministry because even though the product was likely worthless, no legal basis existed to prevent its marketing. Interviewed later about the case, Jameson said that she was not keen to revisit "ancient history [and the case] taught me to stand on my own two feet and taught me who my friends were."

== Honours and awards ==
In 2019, Jameson was awarded the Marsden Medal by the New Zealand Association of Scientists for her work on plant cytokinins, among other work, over her scientific career.

In the 2021 Queen's Birthday Honours, Jameson was appointed an Officer of the New Zealand Order of Merit, for services to plant science.

== Selected works ==
- Controlled cytokinin production in transgenic tobacco using a copper-inducible promoter MJ McKenzie, V Mett, PHS Reynolds and PE Jameson Plant Physiology 116 (3), 969–977. 1998
- Cytokinins and auxins in plant-pathogen interactions–an overview PE Jameson Plant Growth Regulation 32 (2-3), 369–380. 2000
- Changes in the activities of antioxidant enzymes in response to virus infection and hormone treatment SF Clarke, PL Guy, DJ Burritt, PE Jameson Physiologia Plantarum 114 (2), 157–164. 2002
