= Kaiapoi High School =

Location
- 85 Ohoka Road; Kaiapoi 7630; New Zealand; 43.3879°S 172.6458°E

Information
- Funding type: State
- Motto: Ma Te Aroha Ka Tutaki (Through caring, concern and support for others, all things are possible)
- Opened: February 1972
- Ministry of Education Institution no.: 314
- Principal: Jason Reid
- Years offered: 9–13
- Gender: Co-educational
- Enrolment: 1,059 (July 2026)
- Socio-economic decile: 7O
- Website: www.kaiapoi.school.nz

Kaiapoi High School is a state co-educational secondary school located in Kaiapoi, in the Waimakariri District of New Zealand's South Island. The school serves 1,059 students from Years 9 to 13 (approx. ages 12 to 18) as of July 2026.

== History ==
The Kaiapoi Borough Council first approached the government about establishing a school in the town in 1954. The Department of Education approved the purchase of the 20.5-acre (8.3 ha) site on Ohoka Road in September 1961.

The school opened in February 1972. Like many New Zealand state secondary schools built in the 1970s, Kaiapoi High School was built to the S68 standard design, characterised by single-storey classroom blocks of masonry construction, low-pitched roofs with protruding clerestory windows, and internal open courtyards. Other schools using this design in the wider Canterbury area include Hornby High School and Ashburton College.

== Enrolment ==
Kaiapoi High School serves the coastal Waimakariri District, including the towns of Kaiapoi, Woodend, Pegasus, Waikuku, and the surrounding rural area west to Swannanoa. It also serves the rural northeastern part of Christchurch City as far south as the Styx River, including Kainga, Brooklands, Spencerville.

At the April 2014 Education Review Office (ERO) review of the school, Kaiapoi High School had 587 students, including 24 international students. There were slightly more male students (51%) than female students. 79% of students identified as New Zealand European (Pākehā), 14% identified as Māori, and 7% identified as another ethnicity.

As of July 2026, Kaiapoi High School has roll of 1,059 students, of which 219 (20.7%) identify as Māori.

As of 2026, the school has an Equity Index of 465, placing it amongst schools whose students have average socioeconomic barriers to achievement (roughly equivalent to deciles 5 and 6 under the former socio-economic decile system).

== Karanga Mai Young Parents' College ==
Karanga Mai Young Parents' College is a teen parent unit attached to Kaiapoi High School designed to assist teenage parents (and expectant parents) in gaining a secondary school education. Opened in 1992, it was the first teen parent unit in the South Island, and only the second unit in New Zealand.

== Notable alumni ==
- Jenni Adams – New Zealand physicist
