= Cliff Abraham =

American–New Zealand neuroscientist

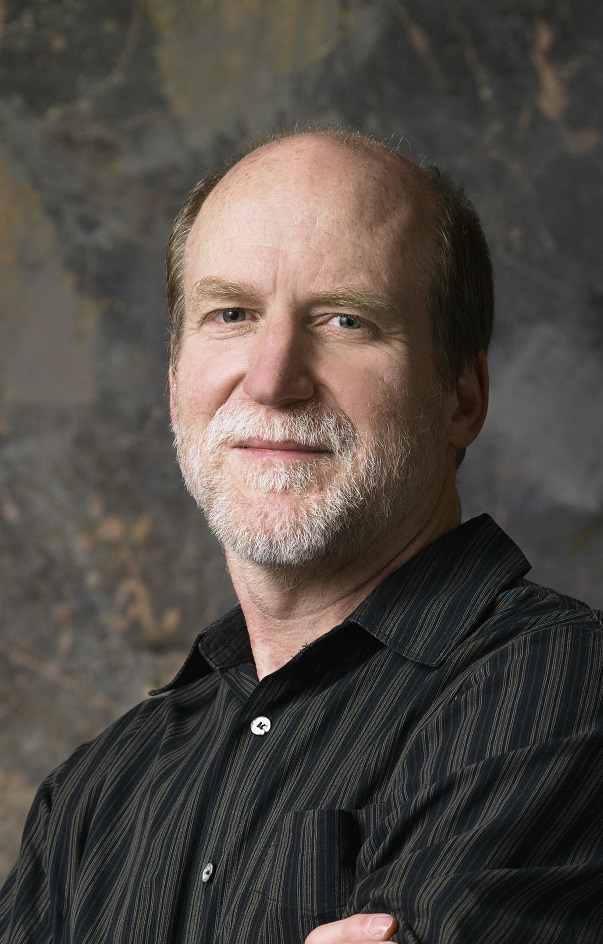
- Abraham in 2009
- Born: Wickliffe Carson Abraham; 24 September 1954 (age 72); Hagerstown, Maryland, U.S.
- Citizenship: New Zealand; United States
- Education: University of Virginia; University of Florida
- Awards: Rutherford Medal (2025); Marsden Medal (2022); Fellow of the Royal Society of New Zealand (1997)
- Scientific career
- Fields: Neuroscience (synaptic plasticity, memory)
- Workplaces: University of Otago
- Thesis: An electrophysiological analysis of chronic ethanol effects on synaptic distribution and function in rat hippocampus (1981)
- Doctoral advisors: Steve Zornetzer; Don Walker

Wickliffe Carson Abraham (born 24 September 1954) is an American–New Zealand neuroscientist and Emeritus Poutoko Taiea Distinguished Professor at the University of Otago. He is known for his work on synaptic plasticity and, in particular, the phenomenon of "metaplasticity" (the plasticity of synaptic plasticity processes themselves). In 2025, he received the Rutherford Medal, the highest award offered by the Royal Society of New Zealand. He was head of the Department of Psychology at the University of Otago from 2003 to 2005, and served as president of the Australasian Neuroscience Society between 2019 and 2020.

== Early life and education ==
Abraham was born in Hagerstown, Maryland, United States, on 24 September 1954, the son of Stuart B. Abraham and Ida Jeanne Abraham (née Dagger). He was educated at North Hagerstown High School, where he was co‑valedictorian in 1972. He went on to study at the University of Virginia, where he earned a Bachelor of Arts degree with distinction in psychology. He then completed his PhD at the University of Florida in 1981, supervised by Steven Zornetzer and Don Walker, with a thesis titled An electrophysiological analysis of chronic ethanol effects on synaptic distribution and function in rat hippocampus. After moving to Dunedin, New Zealand in 1981, Abraham met clinical psychologist Philippa Jane Youard and they were married in 1984. They have three sons born in 1986, 1988 and 1991.

== Career ==
Abraham undertook post-doctoral work at the University of Otago with Graham Goddard, and at the University of Gothenburg, Sweden, with Holger Wigström and Bengt Gustafsson in the Department of Physiology. In 1986, he returned to the University of Otago where he took up a lectureship in the Department of Psychology where he has remained, becoming professor in 1998 and head of department from 2003 to 2005. In 2024, he was named as Poutoko Taiea Distinguished Professor. In 2026, he formally retired from the University of Otago.

During his career, Abraham has held a number of leadership roles in neuroscience. He was Chair of the International Australasian Winter Conference on Brain Research from 2000-2011. He founded the Brain Health Research Centre at the University of Otago and served as its Director from 2007-2014. He was co-Director of the national Centre of Research Excellence, Brain Research New Zealand-Rangahau Roro Aotearoa from 2015-2021, and was co-Lead of the subsequent Aotearoa Brain Project-Kaupapa Roro Aotearoa from 2021-2025. He served as President of the Australasian Neuroscience Society from 2019-2020.

== Research ==
Abraham's work has focused on synaptic plasticity, which is the process by which synapses (the connections between neurons) change in strength following certain types of neural activity. The changes are thought to constitute one of the mechanisms of memory formation/storage. He has particularly explored the molecular mechanisms underlying such changes, which have possible implications for memory disorders such as Alzheimer's disease.

== Honours and awards ==
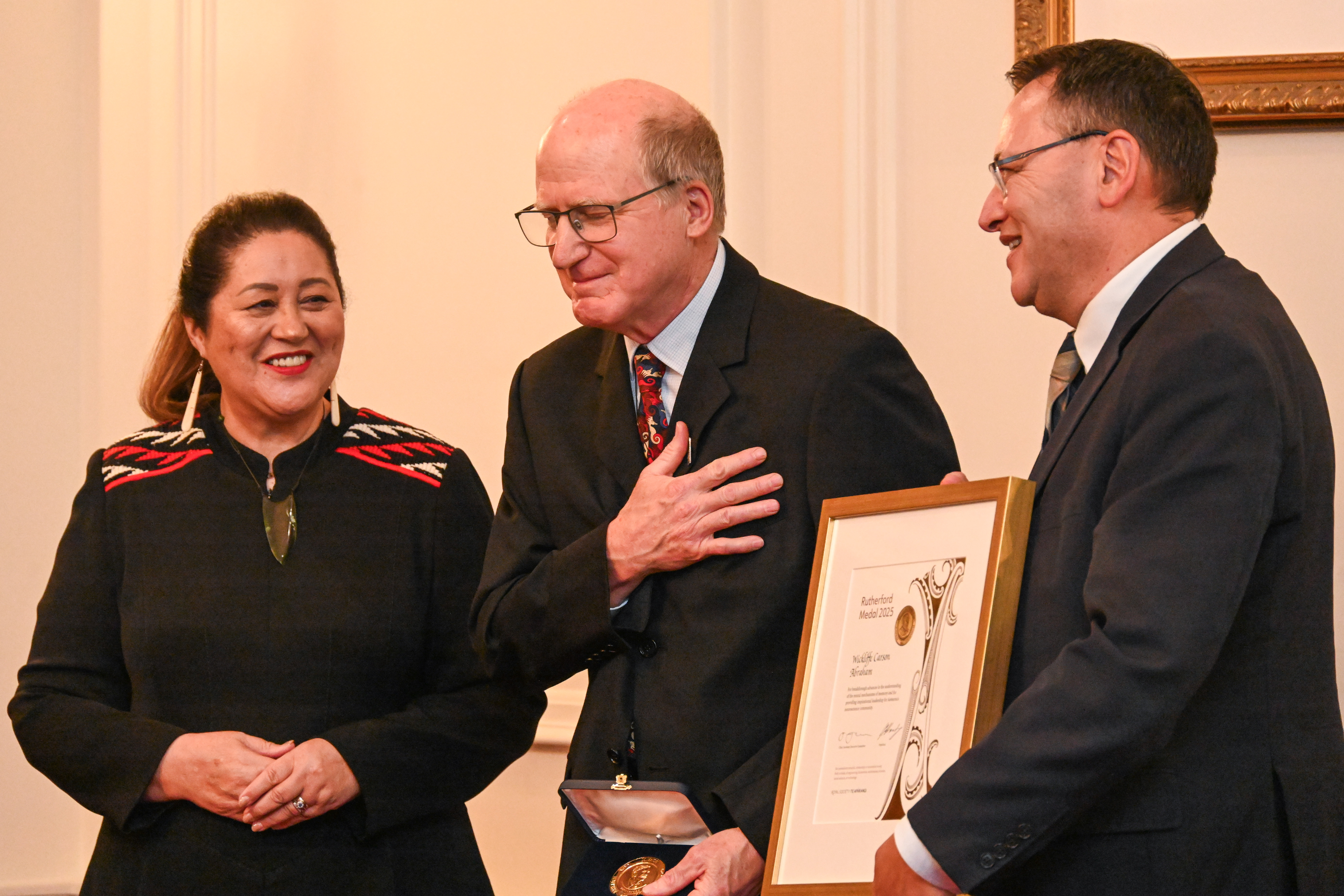
Abraham (centre) accepting the 2025 Rutherford Medal from the Honourable Dr Shane Reti (right) and Dame Cindy Kiro (left), at a ceremony at Government House, Wellington, on 11 November 2025

In 1997, Abraham was elected a Fellow of the Royal Society of New Zealand. In 2006, he was awarded a James Cook Fellowship by the Royal Society of New Zealand for 2007–2008, and in 2009 he received the University of Otago's Distinguished Research Medal. In 2022, Abraham was awarded the Marsden Medal by the New Zealand Association of Scientists, and in 2025 he received the Royal Society of New Zealand's highest research honour, the Rutherford Medal.

== Selected publications ==
- Sateesh, Shruthi; Logan, Barbara J.; Suzuki, Miki; Stellwagen, David; Abraham, Wickliffe C. (2026). "Transregional astrocyte-dependent metaplasticity in the hippocampus." Proceedings of the National Academy of Sciences, USA. 123(28):e2536065123. doi:10.1073/pnas.2536065123. PMID 42412941.
- Abraham, Wickliffe C.; Jones, Owen D.; Glanzman, David L. (2019). "Is plasticity of synapses the mechanism of long-term memory storage?". npj Science of Learning. 4 (1) 9. Bibcode:2019npjSL...4....9A. doi:10.1038/s41539-019-0048-y. PMC 6606636. PMID 31285847.
- Abraham, Wickliffe C. (2008). "Metaplasticity: tuning synapses and networks for plasticity". Nature Reviews Neuroscience. 9 (5): 387–399. doi:10.1038/nrn2356. PMID 18401345.
- Abraham, Wickliffe C.; Bear, Mark F. (1996). "Metaplasticity: the plasticity of synaptic plasticity". Trends in Neurosciences. 19 (4): 126–130. doi:10.1016/S0166-2236(96)80018-X. PMID 8658594.
- Bear, Mark F.; Abraham, Wickliffe C. (1996). "Long-term depression in the hippocampus". Annual Review of Neuroscience. 19: 437–462. doi:10.1146/annurev.ne.19.030196.002253. PMID 8833450.
- Abraham, Wickliffe C.; Goddard, Graham V. (1983). "Asymmetric relations between homosynaptic long-term potentiation and heterosynaptic long-term depression". Nature. 305 (5936): 717–719. doi:10.1038/305717a0. PMID 6633640.
