= Pauline Harris =

New Zealand academic

Pauline Lisa Harris
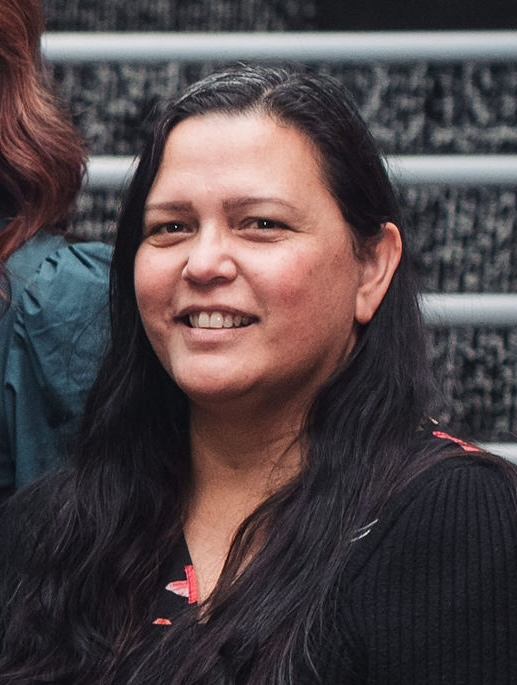
- Education: Victoria University of Wellington, University of Canterbury
- Scientific career
- Fields: Astrophysics, Mātauranga Māori, satellite propulsion
- Thesis: A search for gamma ray burst neutrinos using the Radio Ice Cherenkov Experiment (2008)
- Doctoral advisor: Jenni Adams

Pauline Harris is a New Zealand academic, currently Associate Professor at Te Pūtahi a Toi School of Māori Knowledge at Massey University. She is a central figure in the incorporation of Mātauranga Māori with scientific research in New Zealand, through her roles as Deputy Director (Māori) with the MacDiarmid Institute for Advanced Materials and Nanotechnology and as Associate Vision Mātauranga Theme Leader with the Science for Technological Innovation National Science Challenge. In 2022 she was part of the Matariki Governance Board reporting to the Ministers of Māori Crown Relations, Workplace Relations and Safety, Culture and Heritage and the Prime Minister on the establishment of the Matariki holiday. She is also a leader in developing an Aerospace strategy in Aotearoa that integrates the aims and aspirations of Māori.

She was previously a senior lecturer at the Victoria University of Wellington.

== Academic career ==
After an undergraduate career at Victoria University of Wellington, Harris completed a MSc and a PhD titled ' A search for gamma ray burst neutrinos using the Radio Ice Cherenkov Experiment' at the University of Canterbury, before returning to the Victoria University of Wellington.

Harris established the Society for Māori Astronomy Research and Traditions (SMART) in 2009 with the International year of Astronomy, but has chaired it since 2011. SMART was formed to preserve and revitalise Māori astronomical knowledge, through research and publication. The group consists of scientists and experts in Mātauranga Māori, Tatai Arorangi, Astrophysics and Celestial Navigation who are passionate about Māori astronomical knowledge, its preservation and revitalisation. This is a trust that has been established to regain the long-neglected knowledge of New Zealand Māori astronomy.

Harris has led many externally funded research projects, including A Matauranga Maori Scientific Investigation of Traditional Maori Calendars, Nga Takahuringa o te ao – The effect of Climate Change on Traditional Maori Calendars looking at calendars in Mātauranga Māori and High-magnetic-field Plasma Propulsion Systems Enabling Next Generation Small Satellite Missions with Nick Long developing satellite propulsion systems. As a consequence she is an acknowledged leader in the New Zealand research system at the interface of Mātauranga Māori, astrophysics, and environmental science.

The connection to environmental science is made through the importance of the lunar and stellar calendars to Māori communities, with the lunar calendar being known as the Maramataka. Harris has played a key role in the revitalisation of Maramataka, creating space and opportunity for the Tohunga who are involved in it, creating resources, and wānanga during the early stages of the revitalisation. The impacts of this work in building awareness of climate change in local communities is highly significant, and can be linked to her role in supporting work on environmental remediation with Māori communities.

== Awards ==
In 2024 Harris was awarded the Murray Geddis Medal of the Royal Astronomical Society of New Zealand, in recognition of her far reaching contributions to astronomy in New Zealand, especially in regard to her involvement in creating educational resources and appropriate new channels for dissemination. This includes having created and initiated the planetarium dome programmes for Māori astronomy, training and teaching young navigators to run the programmes and carry on the programmes, then having grown these to a number of domes that run across the country. Her longstanding work contributing to the revitalisation of traditional knowledge around Matariki, and the popularisation of this amongst the wider community, has been widely recognised.

== Selected works ==
- Harris, Pauline, Rangi Matamua, Takirirangi Smith, Hoturoa Kerr, and Toa Waaka. "A review of Māori astronomy in Aotearoa-New Zealand." Journal of Astronomical History and Heritage 16, no. 3 (2013): 325–336.
- Hēmi Whaanga, Pauline Harris, Rangi Matamua. "The science and practice of Māori astronomy and Matariki" New Zealand Science Review Vol 76 (1–2) 2020

== Personal life ==
Harris is of Māori, Rongomaiwahine, Ngāti Rakaipaka and Ngāti Kahungunu descent.
