= Susan M. Scott =

Australian physicist

Susan Scott
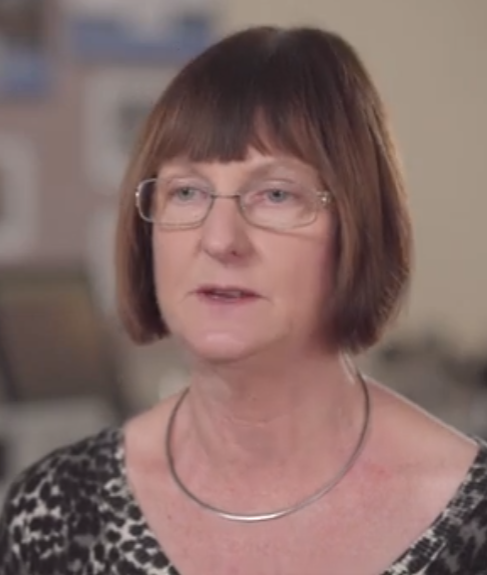
- Born: Susan Marjorie Scott
- Citizenship: Australian
- Education: Monash University; University of Adelaide
- Scientific career
- Fields: Physics
- Workplaces: Australian National University
- Doctoral advisor: Peter Szekeres
- Other academic advisors: Roger Penrose

Susan Marjorie Scott FAA is an Australian mathematical physicist whose work concerns general relativity, gravitational singularities, and black holes. She is a Professor of Theoretical Physics at the Australian National University (ANU).

At ANU, she is the leader of the General Relativity Theory and Data Analysis Group, part of the LIGO Scientific Collaboration that has discovered gravitational waves from collisions involving black holes and neutron stars, and is a member of the LIGO Scientific Collaboration Council.

== Education and career ==
Scott studied mathematics and physics at Monash University and has a doctorate in mathematical physics from the University of Adelaide, under the supervision of Peter Szekeres. She spent four years working with Roger Penrose at the University of Oxford and was a Rhodes Visiting Fellow at Somerville College, before joining the Australian National University faculty in 1998. She is a Chief Investigator for the Australian Research Council Centre of Excellence for Gravitational Wave Discovery (OzGrav).

== Recognition ==
Scott was elected fellow of the Australian Academy of Science in 2016. In 2020, she was elected Fellow of the American Physical Society, and received the 2020 Dirac Medal of the University of New South Wales. In 2020, she was a joint winner of the Prime Minister's Prize for Science. She received the Walter Burfitt Prize from the Royal Society of New South Wales, the Walter Boas Medal from the Australian Institute of Physics in 2022, and the Harrie Massey Medal and Prize from the Institute of Physics (UK). She was awarded the Thomas Ranken Lyle Medal by the Australian Academy of Science in 2023, and the George Szekeres Medal of the Australian Mathematical Society in 2024.

== Books ==
- David L Wiltshire, Matt Visser & Susan Scott, The Kerr Spacetime: Rotating black holes in general relativity (2009) ISBN 978-0-521-88512-6
