= Jane Harding =

New Zealand neonatologist

Dame Jane Harding DNZM FRSNZ FRACP
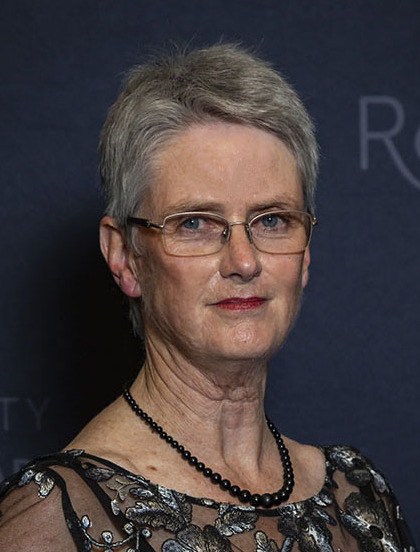
- At 2019 Research Honours Aotearoa
- Born: 1955 (age 70–71)
- Education: University of Auckland; University of Oxford; University of California, San Francisco
- Scientific career
- Fields: Neonatology
- Institutions: University of Auckland

Dame Jane Elizabeth Harding (born 1955) is a New Zealand academic new-born intensive case specialist (neonatologist). She was awarded the Rutherford Medal in 2019. Harding has been the president of the New Zealand national academy of sciences, the Royal Society Te Apārangi, since July 2024.

== Education and career ==
Harding studied at the University of Auckland, graduating in 1978, and in 1982 obtained a DPhil in foetal physiology from the University of Oxford. She returned to in New Zealand for paediatric training then completed a postdoctoral fellowship at the University of California, San Francisco. Following that, she worked at the University of Auckland's faculty of Medicine from 1989, becoming Professor of Neonatology in 1997. She is a researcher in the Liggins Institute at the University of Auckland.

== Honours and awards ==
Harding was elected a Fellow of the Royal Society of New Zealand in 2001. In the 2002 Queen's Birthday and Golden Jubilee Honours, she was appointed an Officer of the New Zealand Order of Merit, for services to paediatrics. She was awarded the Health Research Council of New Zealand's Beaven Medal in 2016. In 2017, Harding was selected as one of the Royal Society Te Apārangi's "150 women in 150 words", celebrating the contributions of women to knowledge in New Zealand.

In 2019, Harding received the Rutherford Medal, New Zealand's highest science honour, from the Royal Society of New Zealand. Also in 2019, Harding received the Supreme Award at the New Zealand Women of Influence Awards. In September 2023, New Zealand's national academy of sciences, the Royal Society Te Apārangi, announced she would be the Society's next president, beginning July 2024.

In the 2020 Queen's Birthday Honours, Harding was promoted to Dame Companion of the New Zealand Order of Merit, for services to neonatology and perinatology.
