= Alan Kirton =

New Zealand agricultural scientist (1933–2001)

Alan Kirton MBE
- Born: 22 February 1933; Stratford, New Zealand
- Died: 25 July 2001 (aged 68)
- Education: Massey University; Michigan State University
- Awards: Marsden Medal; Hutton Medal
- Scientific career
- Fields: agricultural science food science
- Workplaces: Massey University; Ministry of Agriculture and Fisheries

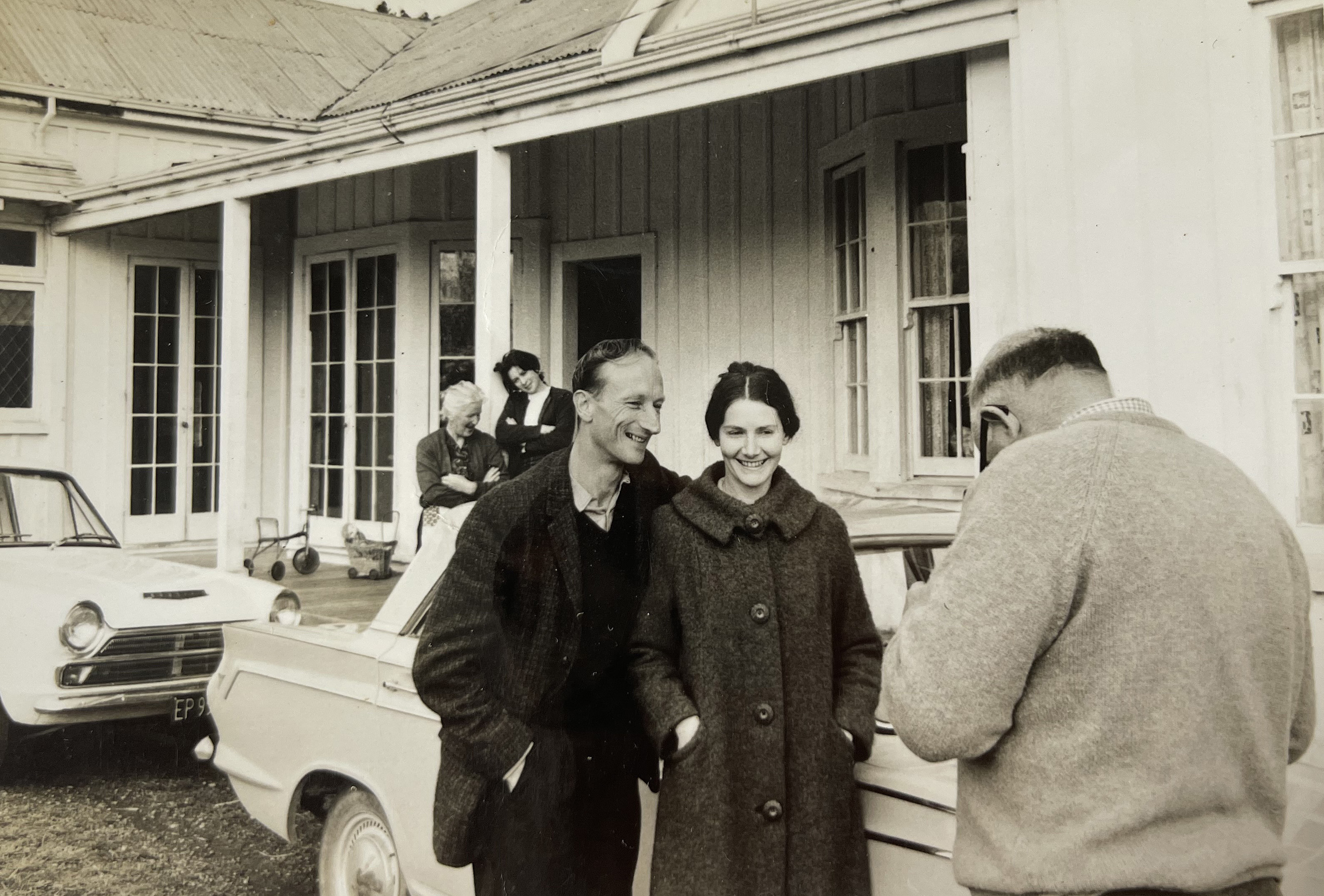
Alan Kirton with wife Helen in 1962 in Bulls, New Zealand

Alan Henry Kirton MBE (22 February 1933 – 25 July 2001) was a New Zealand agricultural scientist.

== Biography ==
Born in Stratford, New Zealand, in 1933, Kirton was raised in a farming family who ran sheep and dairy cows on a block of land in a small settlement called Kohuratahi, approximately 90 km north-east of Stratford. He received his primary education at Marco School and went on to Stratford Technical High School for his secondary schooling where he was taught by Mr H C Johnson, a teacher who influenced many promising agriculturalists including C P McMeekan.

Kirton attended Victoria University of Wellington for his agricultural intermediate before transferring to Massey University where he completed a BAgrSc (1956) and an MAgSc (1958). For his MAgSc he received First Class Honours in Sheep and Dairy Husbandry. While studying at Massey he received a number of prizes including the Lord Bledisloe Prize, the George Terry Memorial Scholarship, the Senior Scholarship in Agriculture (declined), a New Zealand Wool Board Scholarship and a Shell Oil Company Scholarship.

He then spent some time on the Massey staff working for the Sheep husbandry Department. He received a MacMillan Brown Agriculture Research Scholarship and a Fulbright Travel Grant which enabled him to enroll for PhD studies at Michigan State University. He studied under Professor A M Pearson and completed a doctorate in Food Science in 1962. Before leaving the USA Kirton was elected to membership of Sigma Xi, the PhD honorary fraternity.

Upon his return from the United States in 1963 Kirton was employed by the Ministry of Agriculture and Fisheries in the Meat Group at the Ruakura Animal Research Station. In 1966 he was promoted to lead the Meat Group and remained in this position for over 30 years until he retired in 1999.

Kirton drove the need for a research abattoir and then oversaw the planning and construction of Ruakura Research Abattoir. The abattoir remains to this day a major facility for undertaking production and processing research directly aligned to the New Zealand meat industry. Kirton took an interest in animal welfare and chaired the Ruakura Animal Ethics Committee for 10 years from 1988–1997. He was at first met with opposition from parts of the industry but, as a result of his hard work, those attitudes soon faded.

== Achievements ==
Kirton was recognised worldwide as an authority on the growth, development and meat quality of farm animals. His expertise was particularly focused on sheep and then goats. He also had secondary interests in cattle and rabbits. Kirton's research was mainly focused on the chemical and dissected composition of carcasses, and the role of genotype or environment in altering these compositions. This included studying the effectiveness of analysing carcass composition through the use of measures such as potassium-40, ultrasound and various carcass probes. Kirton helped develop more quantitative and scientific methods to help the industry in identifying meat quality to assist the selection of superior breeding sires.

Kirton dispelled a number of myths that prevailed in the industry, showing that—

- Meat from old ram lambs does not have a flavour odour problem
- The shape of a sheep carcass has little effect on meat yield or quality
- White veal production does not require the absence of light or iron
- Goats are an excellent source of lean red meat.

Kirton's leadership was influential in the number of farmers choosing to no longer castrate their rams or even remove the tails, so improving meat yield without compromising meat quality, and improving animal welfare.

Kirton produced over 290 publications for the Meat Science scientific literature, 212 of which he was senior author, and contributed 9 chapters to a number of books at the forefront of the industry. He was a committee member, secretary-treasurer, vice-president, and an honorary life member of the New Zealand Society of Animal Production (1975), a committee member, vice-president, president (1969–70, 1970–71) and (1991–92, 1992–93) of the New Zealand Association of Scientists, and a committee member and a president (1980–81) of the Waikato Section of the New Zealand Institute of Agricultural Science and a council member and president (1987–88) of the national body.

== Honours and awards ==
Kirton was the recipient of a number of awards and honours for his work:

- Fulbright Travel Grant – 1959
- Research Medal of New Zealand Association of Scientists – 1972
- Fellow of New Zealand Institute of Agricultural Science – 1975
- DSc from Massey University for his work in the field of animal growth – 1984
- Marsden Medal of the New Zealand Association of Scientists – 1991
- Fellow of the Royal Society of New Zealand – 1991
- Member of the Order of the British Empire, for services to agricultural science, in the 1994 Queen's Birthday Honours
- Hutton Medal by the Royal Society of New Zealand for Science and Technological Merit in Animal Sciences – 1998
- Doug Campbell Award by the New Zealand Institute of Agricultural Science for Services to the Institute – 1999.
