= David Parry (biophysicist) =

New Zealand biophysicist

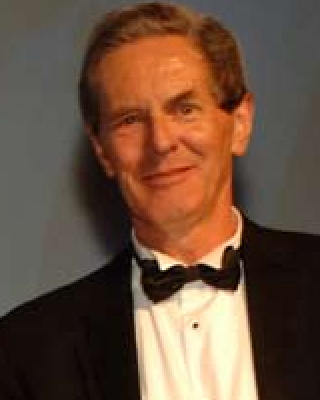
Parry in 2008

David Anthony Dougall Parry CNZM is a New Zealand biophysicist known for his work within the area of ultrastructure scleroprotein analysis. He is the former President of the International Union for Pure and Applied Biophysics and former Vice President of the International Council for Science (ICSU).

His awards include an ICI Prize (1981), Fellow of the Royal Society of New Zealand (1989), the Hercus Medal (2000), the Shorland Medal (2006), and the Rutherford Medal (2008). In the 2007 New Year Honours, he was appointed a Companion of the New Zealand Order of Merit, for services to biophysics. In 2010 he was awarded the Dan Walls Medal.

Parry has a Bachelor of Science (1963) and a Doctor of Science (1982) from the University of London and a Doctor of Philosophy (1966) from King's College London. He was a postdoctoral fellow in the Protein Chemistry division at the Commonwealth Scientific and Industrial Research Organisation in Melbourne, Australia from 1966 to 1969. From 1969 to 1971 he worked for the Children's Cancer Research Foundation in Boston, Massachusetts. Later he became a research scientist at the Laboratory of Molecular Biophysics at Oxford University from 1971 to 1973. He then worked for many years on the faculty of Massey University.

== Sources ==
- New Zealand Association of Scientists Shorland Medal 2006
