= Peter Hunter (bioengineer) =

New Zealand bioengineer

Sir Peter Hunter KNZM FRS FRSNZ
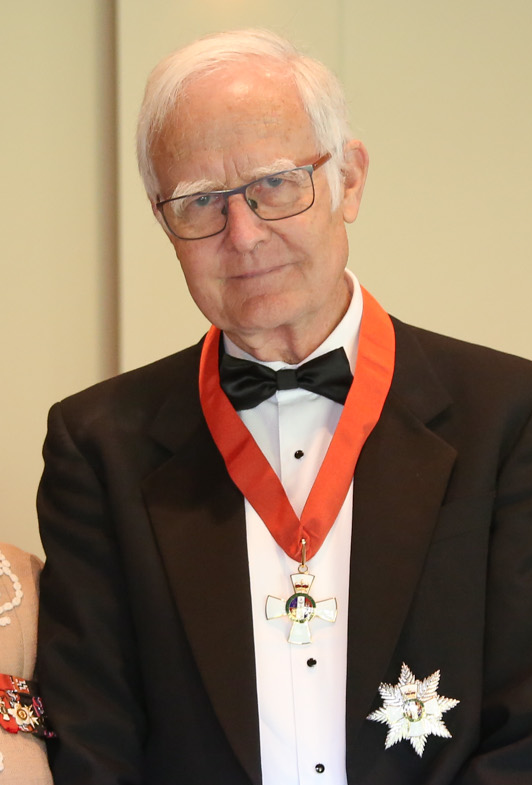
- Hunter in 2025
- Born: Peter John Hunter
- Scientific career
- Fields: Bioengineering
- Workplaces: University of Auckland
- Website: University of Auckland profile

Sir Peter John Hunter KNZM FRS FRSNZ is a New Zealand bioengineer, whose work includes the computer modelling of human organs.

In 1994, Hunter was elected a fellow of the Royal Society of New Zealand, and in 2006, he was elected a fellow of the Royal Society. In 2009, he received the Rutherford Medal, New Zealand's highest science award.

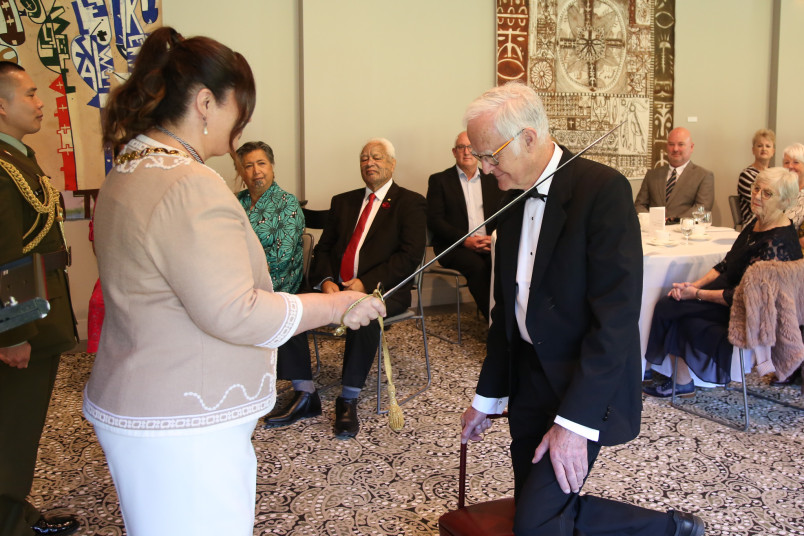
Hunter's investiture as a Knight Companion of the New Zealand Order of Merit by the governor-general, Dame Cindy Kiro, at Government House, Auckland, on 22 May 2025

In the 2010 New Year Honours, Hunter was appointed a Member of the New Zealand Order of Merit, for services to science. In the 2024 King's Birthday Honours, he was promoted to Knight Companion of the New Zealand Order of Merit, for services to medical science.
