= Back-reaction =

In theoretical physics, back-reaction (or backreaction) is often necessary to calculate the self-consistent behaviour of a particle or an object in an external field.

== Intuitive definition ==
When a particle is considered to have no mass or to have an infinitesimal charge, this can be described as saying that we deal with a probe and that back-reaction is neglected. However, a real object also carries (in general) a mass and a charge itself. These properties imply that the model of the original environment needs to be modified to reach self-consistency. For example, a particle can be described as helping to curve the space in general relativity. Taking into account the constraints implied on the model by the particle's properties – the back-reaction – is one way of reaching a more accurate model than if those constraints are ignored.

== Cosmology ==
In inhomogeneous cosmology, in which structure formation is taken into account in a general-relativistic model of the Universe, the term "backreaction" is used for a measure of the non-commutativity of the averaging procedure

$$G_{\mu\nu}(\overline{g_{\alpha\beta}}) \neq \overline{G_{\mu\nu}(g_{\alpha\beta})} = \frac{8\pi G}{c^4}\overline{T_{\mu\nu}}$$

(which comes from the non-linearity of Einstein field equations) and the dynamical evolution of spatial slices of space-time. As of 2017, the role of backreaction in possibly leading to an alternative to dark energy is an open question of debate among cosmologists. The existence of a homogeneity length scale can be considered to be that at which the calculations with and without backreaction give the same results. As of 2017, the existence of such a scale needs experimental confirmation.
