= Margaret Brimble =

New Zealand chemist

Dame Margaret Brimble DNZM FRS
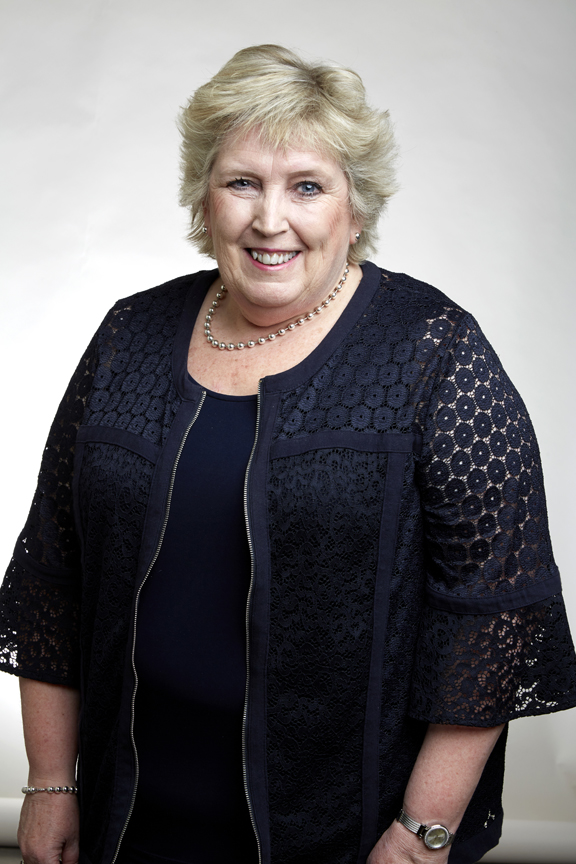
- Brimble at the Royal Society admissions day in London, July 2018
- Born: Margaret Anne MacMillan; 20 August 1961 (age 65); Auckland, New Zealand
- Education: Diocesan School for Girls, Auckland; University of Auckland (BSc, MSc); University of Southampton (PhD)
- Awards: Rutherford Medal (2012); L'Oréal-UNESCO Awards for Women in Science (2007); Hector Memorial Medal (2012)
- Scientific career
- Fields: Chemistry
- Thesis: Salinomycin : the bis-spiroacetal moiety (1985)
- Website: http://web.chemistry.auckland.ac.nz

Dame Margaret Anne Brimble DNZM FRS (née MacMillan; born 20 August 1961) is a New Zealand chemist. Her research has included investigations of shellfish toxins and means to treat brain injuries.

== Early life, family, and education ==
Brimble was born in Auckland on 20 August 1961, the daughter of Mary Anne MacMillan (née Williamson) and Herbert MacMillan, and was encouraged by her grandmother to value education. She attended Diocesan School for Girls, Auckland from 1972 to 1978, and was dux in her final year.

She went on to study chemistry at the University of Auckland from 1979 to 1983, graduating Bachelor of Science in 1982 and Master of Science with first-class honours in 1983. She was awarded a New Zealand Commonwealth scholarship to undertake a PhD in organic chemistry at the University of Southampton.

== Career and research ==
Brimble holds the chair of organic and medicinal chemistry at the University of Auckland and is also a principal investigator in the Maurice Wilkins Centre for Molecular Biodiscovery.

== Awards and honours ==
She is a Fellow of the Royal Society of New Zealand and the Royal Society of Chemistry.

Brimble was the first New Zealander to receive the L'Oreal-UNESCO Award for Women in Science, and the second woman to receive the Rutherford medal.

Brimble was made a Member of the New Zealand Order of Merit for services to science in the 2004 New Year Honours. In the 2012 New Year Honours, she was promoted to Companion of the New Zealand Order of Merit, also for services to science. She was elected a Fellow of the Royal Society (FRS) in 2018. In the 2019 New Year Honours, she was promoted to Dame Companion of the New Zealand Order of Merit, for services to science.

In 2014, Brimble received the Science and Innovation Award at the New Zealand Women of Influence Awards.

In 2017, Brimble was selected as one of the Royal Society Te Apārangi's "150 women in 150 words", celebrating the contributions of women to knowledge in New Zealand.

In 2023, Brimble received the Ernest Guenther Award in Chemistry of Natural Products

Year	Award	Awarded by	Description
2026	Honorary Fellow	Royal Society of Chemistry	Highest Accolade the RSC can bestow, for distinguished service in the field of chemistry
2016	Marsden Medal	New Zealand Association of Scientists	
2012	Rutherford Medal	Royal Society of New Zealand	world-leading contributions to the synthesis of bioactive natural products and novel peptides with wide applications across the life sciences industry
2012	Hector Medal	Royal Society of New Zealand	sustained outstanding research in the field of organic chemistry, notably her impressive research in the field of natural products synthesis and the development of new synthetic methodology.
2012	MacDiarmid Medal	Royal Society of New Zealand	pioneering the design, synthesis and clinical development of a small molecule drug candidate that shows promise for significantly reducing the impact of traumatic brain injury.
2011	Adrien Albert Award	Royal Australian Chemical Institute	
2010	Natural Product Chemistry Award	Royal Society of Chemistry	outstanding contributions to the synthesis of natural products and their analogues
2008	World Class New Zealand Award	Kea and NZ Trade & Enterprise	Research, Science, Technology & Academia
2007	Women in Science Asia-Pacific Laureate in Materials Science	L'Oreal-UNESCO	contributions to the synthesis of complex natural products, especially shellfish toxins.
2005	HortResearch Prize for Excellence in the Chemical Sciences	NZIC	
2004	James Cook Research Fellowship	Royal Society of New Zealand	
2003-4	UK Royal Society Rosalind Franklin International Lectureship		internationally recognised and successful women scientists
2003-4	Novartis Chemistry Lecture Award		outstanding contributions in natural product synthesis and development of new synthetic methodology
2001	Federation of Asian Chemical Societies Distinguished Chemist Award		
1996	Ian Potter Foundation Research Award	University of Sydney	
1992	Hamilton Memorial Prize	Royal Society of New Zealand	
1992	Easterfield Medal	New Zealand Institute of Chemistry	

== Personal life ==
In 1981, she married Mark Timothy Brimble.
