= Rutherford Medal (Royal Society of New Zealand) =

Award of the Royal Society of New Zealand

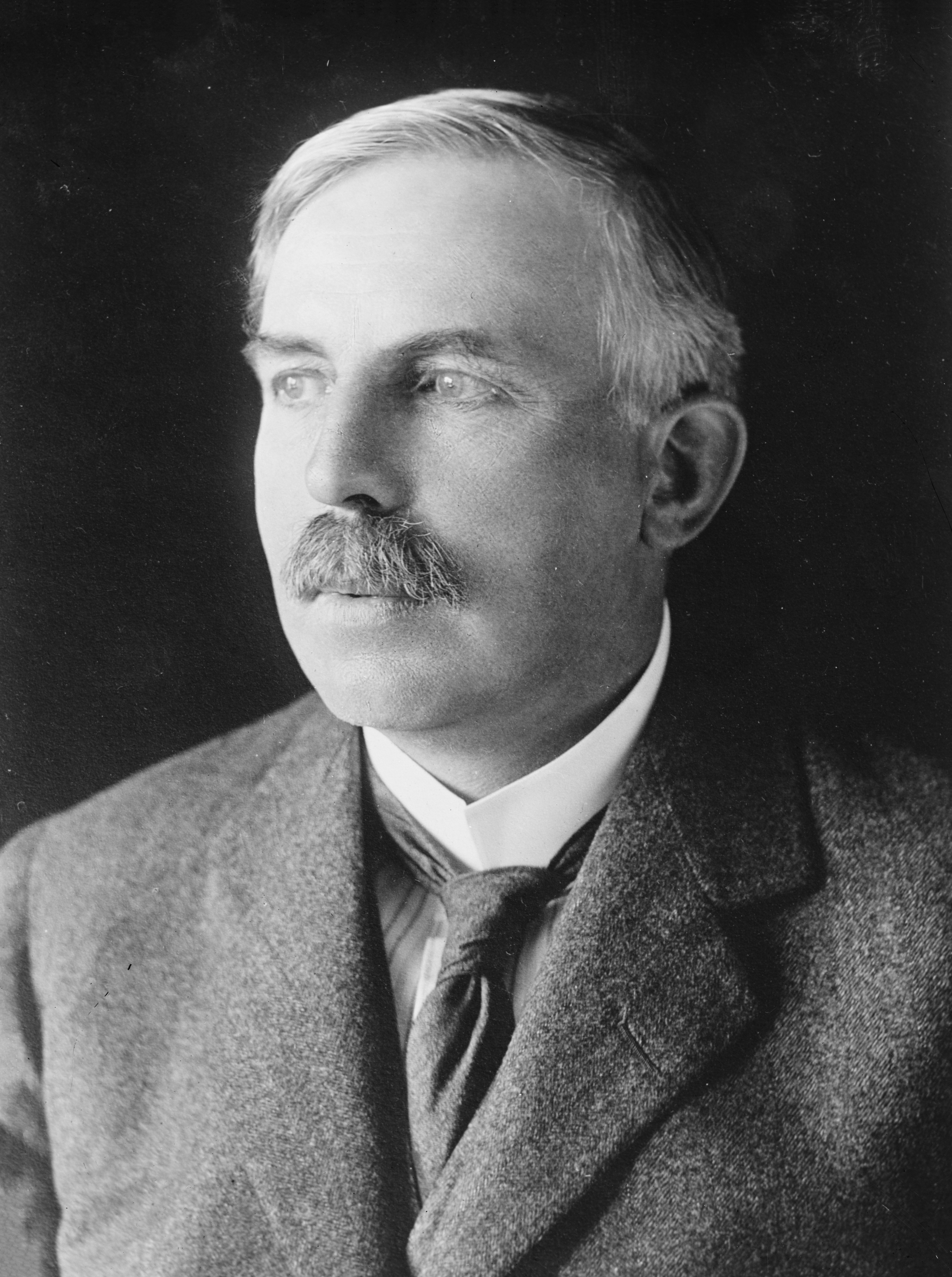
Ernest Rutherford, Lord Rutherford of Nelson

The Rutherford Medal (instituted in 1991 and known as the New Zealand Science and Technology Gold Medal until 2000) is the most prestigious award offered by the Royal Society of New Zealand, consisting of a medal and prize of $100,000. It is awarded at the request of the New Zealand Government to recognize exceptional contributions to the advancement and promotion of public awareness, knowledge and understanding in addition to eminent research or technological practice by a person or group in any field of science, mathematics, social science, or technology. It is funded by the New Zealand government and awarded annually.

The medal is named after Ernest Rutherford, the New Zealand experimental physicist and Nobel Laureate, who pioneered the orbital theory of the atom.

== Recipients ==
Source: Royal Society of New Zealand

New Zealand Science and Technology Gold Medal

- 1991: Vaughan Jones, mathematician, Fields medalist
- 1992: Department of Scientific and Industrial Research Group Award
- 1993: Roy Kerr, mathematician
- 1994: Ian Axford, physicist
- 1995: Bill Denny, oncologist, and Auckland Cancer Research Laboratory
- 1996: No award
- 1997: Thomas William Walker, soil scientist
- 1998: Bill Robinson, seismologist
- 1999: David Vere-Jones, statistician

Rutherford Medal

- 2000: Alan MacDiarmid, chemist, Nobel Prize winner
- 2001: Peter Gluckman, biologist
- 2002: Jeff Tallon, physicist
- 2003: George Petersen, biochemist
- 2004: David Penny, theoretical biologist
- 2005: Paul Callaghan, physicist
- 2006: Ted Baker, structural biologist
- 2007: Richard Faull, neuroscientist
- 2008: David Parry, structural biophysicist
- 2009: Peter Hunter, computational bioengineer
- 2010: Warren Tate, biochemist
- 2011: Christine Winterbourn, biochemist
- 2012: Margaret Brimble, chemist
- 2013: Anne Salmond, social scientist
- 2014: Peter Schwerdtfeger, theoretical chemist and physicist
- 2015: Ian Reid, osteologist
- 2016: Michael Corballis, psychologist
- 2017: Colin Wilson, volcanologist
- 2018: Rod Downey, mathematician
- 2019: Jane Harding, neonatologist
- 2020: Brian Boyd, professor of literature
- 2021: Philippa Howden-Chapman, healthy housing researcher and her team
- 2022: The Dunedin Study, led by Richie Poulton, with team members Murray Thomson, Terrie Moffitt and Avshalom Caspi.
- 2023: Linda Tuhiwai Smith
- 2024: Richard Beasley
- 2025: Cliff Abraham, neuroscientist
- 2026: Philip Hulme, biologist

== See also ==
- Marsden Medal
- List of general science and technology awards
- List of awards named after people
