= Geoff Jameson =

Biochemist in New Zealand

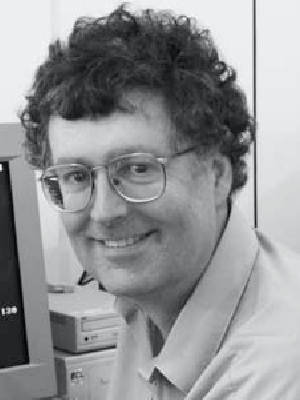
Jameson in 2007

Geoffrey Brind Jameson FRSNZ is a structural chemist and biologist at Massey University in Palmerston North, New Zealand. Jameson completed a PhD at the University of Canterbury in 1977. He is the director of the Centre for Structural Biology, and a crystallographer, using X-ray crystallography and NMR spectroscopy to determine the structure of materials. Geoffrey Brind Jameson has been a professor of structural chemistry and biology at Massey University in New Zealand since 1994.

Jameson was the 2011 recipient of the Marsden Medal from the New Zealand Association of Scientists.
