= Bill Robinson (scientist) =

New Zealand scientist and seismic engineer (1938–2011)

Bill Robinson QSO
- Born: William Henry Robinson; 2 October 1938; West Auckland, New Zealand
- Died: 17 August 2011 (aged 72); Christchurch, New Zealand
- Known for: Invention of the lead rubber bearing
- Awards: Rutherford Medal (1999), Companion of the Queen's Service Order (2007)
- Scientific career
- Fields: Seismic engineering, sea ice
- Workplaces: Robinson Seismic Ltd.; Physics & Engineering Laboratory (DSIR)

William Henry Robinson QSO (2 October 1938 – 17 August 2011) was a New Zealand scientist and seismic engineer who invented the lead rubber bearing seismic isolation device. He grew up in West Auckland, New Zealand. He earned a master's degree at the Ardmore School of Engineering, then a PhD in physical metallurgy at the University of Illinois. Robinson was director of the DSIR's Physics and Engineering Laboratory between 1985 and 1991. He continued to invent and develop seismic isolation devices, travel and lecture until his early 70s.

== Life's work ==
Robinson is most well known for his invention of the lead rubber bearing (LRB) seismic isolation device. He designed the LRB in 1974 while working as a scientist for DSIR (Department of Scientific and Industrial Research, New Zealand). As he was a public service employee when he invented the device, the LRB patent was owned by the state. The LRB is used under more than US$100 billion worth of structures around the world, including New Zealand's Te Papa Tongarewa (National Museum of New Zealand), the new Wellington Hospital, Victoria University Library and Parliament Buildings. Most significant bridges in NZ use base isolation technology.

LRBs are also under the Bhuj Hospital (India) and the C-1 building (Tokyo)—the largest building in the world that is protected by these devices. The Christchurch Women's Hospital is the only building in that city that uses LRBs and it was able to continue operating without any problems throughout the devastating earthquakes that occurred between September 2010 and June 2011.

During the severe 1994 Northridge earthquake in Los Angeles, the LRB-protected University of Southern California Teaching Hospital remained operational while the ten other hospitals in the area were so badly damaged that they had to be evacuated.

The William Clayton building in Wellington, New Zealand, was the first in the world to be base isolated with LRBs. It was built by the then Ministry of Works and Development.

The Ministry of Post and Telecommunications Computer Centre came through the 1995 Kobe quake unscathed and remained fully operational. This significant building is one that is pointed to as an example of how the lead rubber bearing technology saves a building and its contents. Following the Kobe quake there was a large uptake of seismic isolation technology and in particular the Lead Rubber Bearing in Japan.

The second region in which these devices have been well used is California, following the Los Angeles and Northridge earthquake in 1994. The first use of an LRB in the USA was in 1984. Base isolators have since been inserted under more than 100 bridges and 70 buildings in the USA. Building codes in that country require all new hospitals to implement base isolation technology to ensure that they can continue functioning after a major quake.

In more recent years severe earthquakes in India and Turkey have generated interest in seismic isolation technology and many new buildings and bridges are being fitted with seismic isolation.

The costs of using base isolation for large structures have been found to be recouped in only a few years as insurance premiums are reduced so dramatically.

Robinson also invented the Roball and the Roglider base isolation systems for medium-weight and low rise buildings, and the Lead Extrusion Damper, among other seismic isolation devices. He was founder, director and chief engineer of the world-leading seismic engineering company Robinson Seismic Ltd., which continues to test and manufacture his devices. In 1993 Robinson was co-author of An Introduction to Seismic Isolation, along with Ivan Skinner and Graeme McVerry.

== Life ==
Robinson grew up in Auckland, where he attended Avondale College. After completing a master's degree in mechanical engineering at the University of Auckland's Ardmore campus, between 1958 and 1961, Robinson completed a PhD in Physical Metallurgy at the University of Illinois between 1962 and 1965, his thesis titled "High Temperature Internal Friction (Damping) in Potassium Chloride". During his time at Illinois, he spent a summer learning German so that he could complete the necessary reading for his research topic, due to the fact that a lot of important material in the field was published only in German. Following this he spent a short time as a research fellow in physics at the University of Sussex, from 1966 until 1967.

After returning to New Zealand in 1967 Robinson joined the DSIR Physics and Engineering Laboratory (PEL) as a scientist. His work included developing experimental techniques using ultrasonics in solid state physics and initiating a research programme in the Antarctic on sea ice (where he spent a few summers between 1978 and 1989). He also worked at the Scott Polar Research Institute in 1981–1982 (Cambridge, UK). He later became director of PEL (1985–91) and showed particular foresight in giving his full support to the new field of the High Temperature Superconductivity programme.

At the age of 52, Robinson suffered from a near-fatal stroke, spending 4 and a half months in hospital rehabilitation. His "indomitable spirit" enabled him to re-learn how to walk, write and drive, and within six months of the stroke he was back at work as a scientist. In 1995 he founded Robinson Seismic Ltd. to promote, develop and manufacture his seismic protection devices. He semi-retired during his 60s, spending most of his time on a lifestyle farm overlooking the Pacific Ocean, but continued to lecture, travel and develop his seismic engineering ideas part-time.

Robinson married in his early 20s and had three children.

== Honours and awards ==
Robinson was a Fellow of the Royal Society of New Zealand. He was awarded: the Rutherford Medal (the Royal Society Gold Medal for Technology, 1999); an Honorary DSc from Victoria University of Wellington (1995); the Hutton Medal (NZ Institute of Physics, 1992); the ER Coopers Medal for Engineering Research (NZ Royal Society, 1991); the Michaelus Medal for Physics (University of Otago, 1976). He was appointed a Companion of the Queen's Service Order, for services to engineering, in the 2007 Queen's Birthday Honours.

The Robinson Research Institute was formed at Victoria University of Wellington in 2014, and "named to honour the late Dr Bill Robinson—inspirational scientist, seismic engineer and early champion of HTS [high-temperature superconductivity] technology".

== In popular culture ==
On 2 October 2019, Google honoured Robinson by celebrating what would have been his 81st birthday with a Google Doodle.
