= Marsden Medal =

New Zealand science award

The Marsden Medal is a yearly award given by the New Zealand Association of Scientists. It is named after Sir Ernest Marsden and honours "a lifetime of outstanding service to the cause or profession of science, in recognition of service rendered to the cause or profession of science in the widest connotation of the phrase." It rivals the Rutherford Medal from the Royal Society of New Zealand.

== Recipients ==
Year	Recipient	Institution	Reference
1974	Lucy Moore	DSIR	
1975	Arthur Hugh Ward	Massey University	
1976	Ken Harrow	DSIR	
1977	Jim Brodie	New Zealand Oceanographic Institute	
1980	Al Rae	Massey University	
1985	George Knox	University of Canterbury	
1987	Richard Taylor		
1989	John Watkinson	Ruakura Agricultural Research Centre	
1991	Alan Kirton	Ruakura Agricultural Research Centre	
1997	Jennifer Hartley	AgResearch	
1998	Rodger Sparks	Institute of Geological and Nuclear Sciences	
1999	Graeme Wake	University of Canterbury	
2000	David Penny	Massey University	
2001	Ian Speden	Institute of Geological and Nuclear Sciences	
2002	Howard Wearing	HortResearch	
2003	Roger Green	University of Auckland	
2004	Peter Barrett	Victoria University of Wellington	
2005	Kevin Tate	Landcare Research	
2006	Tim Haskell	Industrial Research Limited	
2007	Ailsa Goulding	University of Otago	
2008	Yeap Foo	Industrial Research Limited	
2009	Fred Davey	Geological and Nuclear Sciences	
2010	Brian Robinson	University of Otago	
2011	Geoffrey B. Jameson	Massey University	
2012	Lionel Carter	Victoria University of Wellington	
2013	Barry Scott	Massey University	
2014	Mick Clout; Keith Hunter	University of Auckland; University of Otago	
2015	Mike Andrews	Industrial Research Limited	
2016	Margaret Brimble	University of Auckland	
2017	Carolyn Burns	University of Otago	
2018	John Montgomery; Warren Tate	University of Auckland; University of Otago	
2019	Paula Jameson	University of Canterbury	
2020	Martha Savage	Victoria University of Wellington	
2021	Virginia Braun	University of Auckland	
2022	Cliff Abraham	University of Otago	
2023	Richie Poulton	University of Otago	
2024	Mike Dragunow	University of Auckland	
2025	Tony Conner	New Zealand Institute for Bioeconomy Science	

== See also ==
- Rutherford Medal
- List of general science and technology awards
- List of awards named after people
