= Robert Walker Hay =

British chemist

- Born: 17 September 1934; Stirling, Scotland
- Died: 8 January 1999 (aged 64)
- Education: Glasgow University
- Known for: Curtis-Hay ligands
- Scientific career
- Fields: organic chemistry
- Workplaces: Victoria University of Wellington, University of Sterling, St Andrews University
- Thesis: The catalysed decarboxylation of oxaloacetic acid. (1960)
- Doctoral students: Kevin Tate

Robert Walker Hay FRSE FRCS (1934–1999) was a British chemist. He held the chair in Chemistry at Stirling University and later St Andrews University.

== Life ==
Hay went to Glasgow University to study chemistry, graduating BSc in 1956 and then later receiving a doctorate (PhD) in Carbohydrate Chemistry in 1959.

Hay moved to New Zealand in around 1962 to take up a post lecturing in both Organic and Inorganic Chemistry at the Victoria University of Wellington. Here, together with Neil Curtis, he formulated the Curtis-Hay ligands, a method of preparing diamines in acetone.

In 1978 Hay was elected a fellow of the Royal Society of Edinburgh. His proposers were Ronald Percy Bell, William Parker, John Michael Tedder, Charles Kemball, Evelyn Ebsworth and Roy Foster.

== The Bob Hay Lectureship ==
The Bob Hay Lectureship was established by the Macrocyclic and Supramolecular Chemistry Interest Group of the Royal Society of Chemistry in 2001 in Hay's memory. The lecture is given annually by a younger chemist (within 15 years of the completion of their PhD) working in the area of macrocyclic and/or supramolecular chemistry.
