= Dan Walls =

New Zealand physicist (1942–1999)

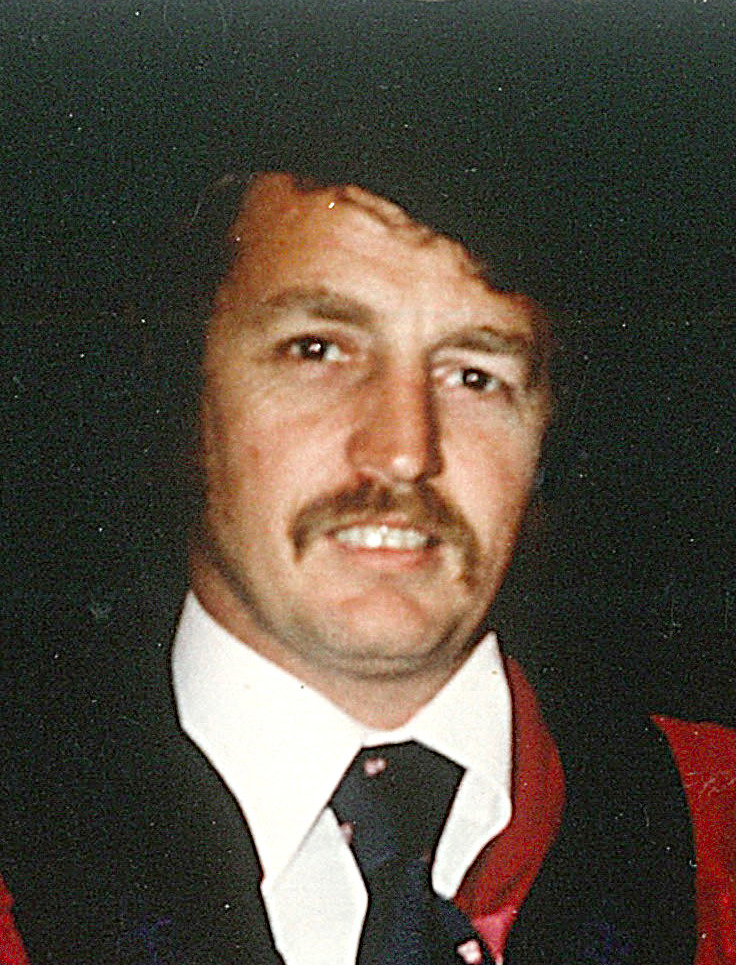
- Dan Walls
- Born: Daniel Frank Walls; 13 September 1942; Napier, New Zealand
- Died: 12 May 1999 (aged 56); Auckland, New Zealand
- Education: University of Auckland (BSc, MSc); Harvard University (PhD)
- Known for: Quantum optics Squeezed coherent states
- Awards: Einstein Prize for Laser Science (1990); FRS (1992); IOP Dirac Medal (1995)
- Scientific career
- Fields: Theoretical physics Quantum optics
- Workplaces: University of Auckland; University of Waikato
- Thesis: Topics in Non-Linear Quantum Optics (1969)
- Doctoral advisor: Roy J. Glauber
- Doctoral students: Howard Carmichael; Peter Drummond; Gerard J. Milburn; Margaret Reid; Monika Ritsch-Marte
- Website: www.royalsociety.org.nz/publications/reports/yearbooks/year1999/obituaries/dan-walls

Daniel Frank Walls FRS (13 September 1942 – 12 May 1999) was a New Zealand theoretical physicist specialising in quantum optics.

== Education ==
Walls gained a BSc in physics and mathematics and a first class honours MSc in physics at the University of Auckland. He then went to Harvard University as a Fulbright Scholar, obtaining his PhD in 1969. He was supervised by Roy J. Glauber who was later awarded a Nobel prize in 2005.

== Career and research ==
After holding postdoctoral research positions in Auckland and Stuttgart, Walls became a senior lecturer in physics at the University of Waikato in 1972, where he became professor in 1980. Together with his colleague Crispin Gardiner, during the next 25 years he established a major research centre for theoretical quantum optics in New Zealand and built active and productive collaborations with groups throughout the world.

In 1987 he moved to the University of Auckland as professor of theoretical physics.

His major research interests centred on the interaction and similarities between light and atoms. He was notable for his wide-ranging expertise in relating theory to experiment, and was involved in all major efforts to understand non-classical light. A seminal paper by Walls with his first graduate student Howard Carmichael, showed how to create antibunched light, in which photons arrive at regular intervals, rather than randomly.

Walls was a pioneer in the study of ways that the particle-like nature of light (photons) could be controlled to make optical systems less susceptible to unwanted fluctuations, in particular by the use of squeezed light, a concept formulated by Carlton Caves. In squeezed light, some fluctuations can be made very small provided other fluctuations are correspondingly large.

He made major contributions to the theory of quantum measurement such as those involving Albert Einstein's"which-path" experiment, and the quantum nondemolition measurement. Walls also used a simple field theoretical approach to explain and corroborate Dirac's description of photon interference and in particular Dirac's statement "that a photon interferes only with itself."

In the later stages of his career he focused his research efforts on the theoretical aspects of the newly created state of matter, the Bose–Einstein condensate (BECs). Some of his contributions in the field include the prediction of the interference signature of quantized vortices, and the collapses and revivals of the Josephson coupled BECs.

=== Awards and honours ===
Walls was elected a Fellow of the Royal Society (FRS) in 1992. Walls was also elected Fellow of the American Physical Society (1981) and the Royal Society of New Zealand (FRSNZ). In 1995 he was awarded the Dirac Medal by the Institute of Physics for theoretical physics.

The Dodd-Walls Centre for Photonic and Quantum Technologies, a New Zealand Centre of Research excellence based in the University of Otago, was named after Jack Dodd and Dan Walls in recognition of their pioneering roles in establishing New Zealand's as an internationally recognised standing in photonics, quantum optics and ultra-cold atoms.

== Personal life ==
Dan Walls had two younger siblings, a sister and a brother. He married Fari Khoy in 1968 with whom he had one son, Mark, in 1980. This marriage ended in 1986. His partner in later years was Pamela King. Walls died of cancer at hospital, in Auckland, aged 57.

== Legacy ==
In 2008 the New Zealand Institute of Physics named a biennial award in honour of Walls. The Dan Walls Medal is awarded to "the physicist working in New Zealand who is deemed to have made the greatest impact nationally and/or internationally in their field through predominantly New Zealand-based research". Winners have included Paul Callaghan, David Parry, Jeff Tallon, Matt Visser, Howard Carmichael, Peter Schwerdtfeger, and Jenni Adams.
