= Jenni Adams =

New Zealand physicist

- Born: Jennifer Anne Adams
- Awards: Dan Walls Medal (2021)

Academic background
- Education: Oxford University
- Thesis: Cosmological phase transitions: techniques and phenomenology (1995)
- Doctoral advisor: Subir Kumar Sarkar

Academic work
- Institutions: Uppsala University|University of Canterbury
- Doctoral students: Pauline Harris

Jennifer Anne Adams FRSNZ (born 1970) is a New Zealand physicist who works on astroparticle physics and cosmology at the University of Canterbury. She was awarded a Rhodes Scholarship and was the winner of the 2021 Dan Walls Medal. She is a full professor, and was elected as a Fellow of the Royal Society Te Apārangi in 2023. Adams is the lead New Zealand scientist in the international neutrino observatory at the South Pole, the IceCube collaboration.

== Academic career ==
Adams was educated at Kaiapoi High School, where she first aspired to be an astronaut, before realising that actual discoveries about the universe were not made by astronauts. Adams completed an astronomy degree at the University of Canterbury and then was awarded a Rhodes Scholarship in 1992. Her doctorate, completed in 1995 on the topic of cosmological phase transitions, was titled Cosmological phase transitions: techniques and phenomenology.

Following the completion of her PhD, Adams undertook postdoctoral research in cosmology at Uppsala University, where she also enjoyed the orienteering opportunities.

Adams was offered a lecturing position at the University of Canterbury, and started work there in 1998. She was promoted to a full professorship in 2020.

Adams is the lead New Zealand scientist in the international IceCube Neutrino Observatory.

== Awards ==
Adams was President of the New Zealand Institute of Physics in 2008 when the Dan Walls Award was established. In 2021 she was awarded the medal herself.

In 2023 Adams was elected as a Fellow of the Royal Society Te Apārangi.

== Selected works ==
- Collaboration, IceCube; Aartsen, M. G.; Abbasi, R.; Abdou, Y.; Ackermann, Markus; Adams, Jenni; Aguilar, J. A.; Ahlers, Markus; Altmann, D.; Auffenberg, J.; Bai, X.; Baker, M.; Barwick, S. W.; Baum, V.; Bay, R. (1 November 2013). "Evidence for high-energy extraterrestrial neutrinos at the IceCube detector". Science. 342 (6161) 1242856. arXiv:1311.5238. Bibcode:2013Sci...342E...1I. doi:10.1126/SCIENCE.1242856. PMID 24264993. S2CID 27788533.
- Abbasi, R.; Ackermann, Markus; Adams, Jenni; Ahlers, Markus; Ahrens, J.; Andeen, K.; Auffenberg, J.; Bai, X.; Baker, Mark David; Barwick, S. W.; Bay, R.; Alba, J. L. Bazo; Beattie, K.; Becka, T.; Becker, J. K. (1 April 2009). "The IceCube data acquisition system: Signal capture, digitization, and timestamping". Nuclear Instruments and Methods in Physics Research Section A. 601 (3): 294–316. arXiv:0810.4930. Bibcode:2009NIMPA.601..294A. doi:10.1016/J.NIMA.2009.01.001.
- Aartsen, M. G.; Ackermann, Markus; Adams, Jenni; Aguilar, J. A.; Ahlers, Markus; Ahrens, M.; Altmann, D.; Anderson, T.; Arguelles, C.; Arlen, T. C.; Auffenberg, J.; Bai, X.; Barwick, S. W.; Baum, V.; Beatty, James (2 September 2014). "Observation of high-energy astrophysical neutrinos in three years of IceCube data". Physical Review Letters. 113 (10) 101101. arXiv:1405.5303. Bibcode:2014PhRvL.113j1101A. doi:10.1103/PHYSREVLETT.113.101101. PMID 25238345. S2CID 220469354.
- Abbasi, R.; Abdou, Y.; Abu-Zayyad, T.; Ackermann, Markus; Adams, Jenni; Aguilar, J. A.; Ahlers, Markus; Altmann, D.; Andeen, K.; Auffenberg, J.; Bai, X.; Baker, Mark David; Barwick, S. W.; Bay, R.; Alba, J. L. Bazo (18 April 2012). "An absence of neutrinos associated with cosmic-ray acceleration in γ-ray bursts". Nature. 484 (7394): 351–354. arXiv:1204.4219. doi:10.1038/NATURE11068. PMID 22517161. S2CID 205228690.
