= Kevin Tate =

New Zealand organic chemist (1943–2018)

- Born: Kevin Russel Tate; 8 April 1943; Lower Hutt, New Zealand
- Died: 22 January 2018 (aged 74); Palmerston North, New Zealand
- Education: Victoria University of Wellington
- Scientific career
- Fields: Organic chemistry Soil chemistry Ecology
- Workplaces: Department of Scientific and Industrial Research; Landcare
- Thesis: Kinetic and mechanistic studies of decarboxylation (1968)
- Doctoral advisor: Robert Walker Hay

Kevin Russel Tate (8 April 1943 – 22 January 2018) was a New Zealand soil chemist, ecologist and climate scientist.

== Early life and family ==
Born in Lower Hutt on 8 April 1943, Tate was the son of Dudley Tate and Hazel Winifred Tate (née Jackson-Hughes). He was educated at Hutt Valley High School from 1956.

== Scientific career ==
Tate studied chemistry at Victoria University of Wellington, graduating BSc in 1964, and MSc the following year. His master's thesis was titled A study of the dealdolisation of diacetone alcohol. Tate then completed a PhD on decarboxylation kinetics and mechanisms under Robert Walker Hay at Victoria, before moving to Soil Bureau, a branch of the Department of Scientific and Industrial Research (DSIR) in the Hutt Valley. In 1992, DSIR was dissolved and Soil Bureau became Landcare Research, a Crown Research Institute, and he moved with it to Palmerston North, on the campus of Massey University.

Much of Tate's early research involved the storage and cycling of phosphorus and carbon in soils, particularly in economically important New Zealand grasslands and native forests. Later work focused on carbon cycling and sequestration, particularly as climate change became an issue and the question of how soils and soil biota could impact atmospheric carbon dioxide levels became relevant.

Tate also contributed his soil chemistry knowledge to other research topics at Soil Bureau / Landcare, including sand dune rehabilitation, restoration of pasture after topsoil removal and understanding tussock grasslands. Many papers were coauthored with people including Des J. Ross, C.W. Feltham, Benny K.G. Theng, R.H. Newman, Neal A. Scott, Surinder Saggar, Paul C.D. Newton, Troy Baisden, Aroon Parshotam, David A. Wardle and Gregor W. Yeates.

Retirement in 2005 did not stop Tate working on his science. One of his last works was editing Microbial Biomass, a 2017 volume on soil and ecosystem microbial processes.

Tate died in Palmerston North on 22 January 2018.

== Honours and awards ==
In 1995, Tate was elected a Fellow of the Royal Society of New Zealand, the peak science organisation in New Zealand. He was also elected to fellowships of the New Zealand Institute of Chemistry and the New Zealand Society of Soil Science.

In 2005, Tate was awarded the Marsden Medal by the New Zealand Association of Scientists for "contribution to, and leadership of, research into ecosystem processes and climate change [spanning] four decades."

== Selected works ==
- Tate, K.R.; Ross, D.J.; Feltham, C.W. (1988). "A direct extraction method to estimate soil microbial C: effects of experimental variables and some different calibration procedures". Soil Biology and Biochemistry. 20 (3): 329–335. Bibcode:1988SBiBi..20..329T. doi:10.1016/0038-0717(88)90013-2.
- Newman, R.H.; Tate, K.R. (1980). "Soil phosphorus characterisation by ^{31}P nuclear magnetic resonance". Communications in Soil Science & Plant Analysis. 11 (9): 835–842. Bibcode:1980CSSPA..11..835N. doi:10.1080/00103628009367083.
- Jensen, L.S.; Mueller, T.; Tate, K.R.; Ross, D.J.; Magid, J.; Nielsen, N.E. (1996). "Soil surface CO_{2} flux as an index of soil respiration in situ: a comparison of two chamber methods". Soil Biology and Biochemistry. 28 (10): 1297–1306. doi:10.1016/s0038-0717(96)00136-8.
- Ross, D.J.; Tate, K.R.; Scott, N.A.; Feltham, C.W. (1999). "Land-use change: effects on soil carbon, nitrogen and phosphorus pools and fluxes in three adjacent ecosystems". Soil Biology and Biochemistry. 31 (6): 803–813. Bibcode:1999SBiBi..31..803R. doi:10.1016/s0038-0717(98)00180-1.
