= Marriott (surname) =

Marriott is an English surname of Huguenot origin. Notable people with the surname include:

- Adam Marriott (born 1991), English footballer
- Alan Marriott (footballer) (born 1978), English footballer
- Alan Marriott (voice actor) (born 1971), Canadian voice actor
- Alastair Marriott, English ballet dancer
- Alice Marriott (actress) (1824–1900), British actress
- Alice Marriott (historian) (1910–1992), American historian and anthropologist
- Alice Marriott (1907–2000), American businesswoman, entrepreneur and philanthropist
- Alvin Marriott (1902–1992), Jamaican sculptor
- Andy Marriott (born 1970), Welsh footballer
- Anne Marriott (1913–1997), Canadian writer
- Anthony Marriott (1931–2014), British playwright, screenwriter and actor
- Arthur Marriott (c. 1821–1866), Australian cricketer
- Bill Marriott (J. W. Marriott; born 1932), chairman and CEO, Marriott International
- Bill Marriott (footballer) (1880–1944), English footballer
- Bob Marriott, British boxer
- Bubba Marriott (born 1938), American football player
- Charles Marriott (1895–1966), English cricketer
- Charles Marriott (priest) (1811–1858), Anglican priest, a fellow of Oriel College, Oxford, and one of the members of the Oxford Movement
- Charles Marriott (cricketer, born 1848) (1848–1918), English cricketer and barrister
- Charles Marriott (rugby union) (1861–1936), English rugby union player
- Chris Marriott (born 1989), Welsh footballer
- David Marriott (born 1963), British philosopher and poet
- David Daniel Marriott (born 1939), American politician
- Dennis Marriott (1939–2014), Jamaican-born English cricketer
- Don Marriott (1916–1989), Australian politician
- Edmund H. Marriott, Canadian Army officer
- Edward Marriott (born 1966), British psychotherapist and organisational psychologist
- Ernest Marriott (born 1857), English rugby union player
- Ernie Marriott (1913–1989), English footballer
- Fitzherbert Marriott (1811–1890), Australian Anglican priest
- Frank Marriott (1874–1957), Australian politician
- Fred Marriott (1872–1956), American race car driver
- Fred Marriott (footballer) (1886–1954), Australian rules footballer
- Fred Marriott (politician) (1910–1994), Australian politician
- Frederick Marriott (1805–1884), Anglo-American publisher and aviation pioneer
- Gareth Marriott (born 1970), British slalom canoeist
- George Marriott (1886–1964), member of the Queensland Legislative Assembly
- George Marriott (cricketer) (1855–1905), English cricketer and clergyman
- Georgina G. Marriott (1865–1946), American educator and clubwoman
- Gladys Marriott (1922–2005), American politician
- Harold Marriott (1875–1949), English cricketer
- Harvey Marriott (1907–1942), Australian private who was killed in the Ration Truck massacre
- Hayes Marriott (1873–1929), British colonial administrator
- Henry Marriott (1870–1952), British Archdeacon of Bermuda
- J. Willard Marriott (1900–1985), American founder of Marriott Corporation
- Jack Marriott (Royal Navy officer) (1879–1938), British naval officer
- Jack Marriott (footballer) (born 1994), English footballer
- Jackie Marriott (1928–2016), English footballer
- Sir James Marriott (judge) (1730–1803), British judge, politician and scholar
- James Marriott (author) (1972–2012), English film critic and writer
- James Marriott (musician) (born 1997), British YouTuber and musician
- James Henry Marriott (1799–1886), New Zealand theatre manager, actor, writer and bookseller
- Jane Marriott (born 1976), British diplomat
- Janice Marriott (born 1946), New Zealand writer
- Jim Marriott (born 1934), American politician
- John Marriott (British politician) (1859–1945), English political economist and historian
- John Marriott (footballer), Australian rules footballer
- John Marriott (actor) (1893–1977), American actor
- John Marriott (poet) (1780–1825), English poet and clergyman
- John Marriott (philatelist) (1922–2001), British philatelist
- John Marriott (Australian politician) (1913–1994), Australian Senator
- John Charles Oakes Marriott (1895–1978), British Army general
- Karla-Sue Marriott, American scientist
- Lauren Marriott, New Zealand illustrator, comics artist, sculptor, and graphic designer
- Lisa Marriott, New Zealand accounting academic
- Louis Marriott (1935–2016), Jamaican actor, director, writer, broadcaster
- McKim Marriott (1924–2024), American anthropologist
- Michael Marriott (economist) (1926–1975), head of London Stock Exchange, father of Tim Marriott
- Michael Marriott (rosarian) (fl. 1970s–2020s), British rosarian
- Moore Marriott (1885–1949), English character actor
- Neill F. Marriott (born 1947), American religious leader
- Patrick Marriott (born 1958), British Army officer
- Richard Marriott (born 1951), American composer and performer
- Richard Marriott (Lord Lieutenant) (1930–2021), English banker
- Robert H. Marriott (1879–1951), American electrical engineer and radio pioneer
- Stephen Marriott (1886–1964), Anglican priest
- Steve Marriott (1947–1991), English rock and roll singer
- T. Leigh Marriott (1871–1941), American politician from Maryland
- Tim Marriott (born 1958), English actor
- Toby Marriott (born 1976), British musician
- Tom Marriott (born 1998), English footballer
- Victor Marriott (born 1938), English rugby union player
- Wilfred Marriott (born 1994), English cricketer
- William Marriott (baseball) (1893–1969), American baseball player
- William Marriott (cricketer) (1850–1887), English cricketer
- William Marriott (engineer) (1857–1943), British engineer and locomotive superintendent
- William Hammond Marriott (1790–1851), American politician in the Maryland House of Delegates
- William Thackeray Marriott (1834–1903), British barrister and politician
