= Mike Berridge (biologist) =

New Zealand cell biologist

Michael Vivian Berridge (born 1946) is a New Zealand cell biologist. Since 1976, he has led the cancer cell and molecular biology research group at the Malaghan Institute of Medical Research. He is also a professor at Victoria University of Wellington and a Distinguished Research Fellow at the Malaghan Institute of Medical Research. He is best known for elucidating cellular mechanisms of reduction of tetrazolium dyes that are widely used in biology, and for the discovery of mitochondrial genome transfer from healthy cells to mitochondrial DNA-deficient cancer cells.

== Early life and education ==
Berridge was born in Auckland in 1946 and was brought up in Northland, Naumai and Dargaville. He did an undergraduate in Chemistry at the University of Auckland and conducted his honours project in cell biology. Following this, he continued to study at the University of Auckland, completing an MSc (Hons) in 1969 and a PhD in cell biology in 1971 working with a group of plant growth hormones called cytokines. These theses investigated how kinetin interacts with protein synthesis in plants.

== Career and research ==
In 1973, Berridge undertook a postdoctoral position at Purdue University in developmental molecular biology. working under Professor Arthur Aronson. There, he investigated how mRNA formed from heterogeneous nuclear RNA, including exploration of enzymes involved in RNA processing. He then undertook a staff scientist position at the National Institute for Medical Research, Mill Hill London, UK, working under Dr Jamshed Tata in Developmental Biology.

In 1976, he returned to New Zealand and established the Cancer Cell & Molecular Biology Research Group as one of the founding researchers of the Wellington Cancer & Medical Research Institute, later renamed the Malaghan Institute of Medical Research. Here, he first investigated blood cell development, with a focus on determinants of stem cells differentiation. His research group then collaborated with Dr Fu-Keun Lin at Amgen to characterise the cellular receptor of the red cell hormone, erythropoietin, and its ability to stimulate platelet production.

Having found that cytokines and hormones change the way in which glucose is taken up by cells, Berridge shifted his research focus to glucose metabolism. Research from 2009 to 2015, in collaboration Professor Jiri Neuzil (Griffith University, QLD, Australia and BIOCEV, Prague, and Dr Lanfeng Dong (Griffith University, QLD) used mitochondrial DNA polymorphisms to unequivocally show mitochondrial genome transfer from healthy cells to cancer cells lacking mitochondrial DNA, and that this occurred by intercellular mitochondrial transfer.

As a result, he shifted his research focus to mitochondrial cancer biology. Using genetic knock-out mouse models, his lab group currently investigates how proteins encoded in nuclear DNA contribute to the formation of mitochondrial respiratory complexes and the role of these complexes in tumour metastasis. He is also applying this knowledge to develop an early detection assay for mitochondrial damage in neurodegenerative diseases.

Berridge has published popular science books including The Edge of Life in 2015, and Sugar, Rum and Tobacco: Taxes and Public Health in New Zealand with Lisa Marriott in 2017.

== Awards and honours ==
In 2003, Berridge received a James Cook Research Fellowship in health sciences from the Royal Society Te Apārangi.

He was awarded the Health Research Council of New Zealand Liley Medal in 2016 for an outstanding contribution to health and medical sciences in the field of cellular metabolism. The same year he was a semi-finalist in the KiwiBank New Zealander of the Year Awards.

In 2021, he was awarded the Shorland Medal by the New Zealand Association of Scientists in recognition of major and continued contribution to basic or applied research that has added significantly to scientific understanding or resulted in significant benefits to society.

In December 2021, Berridge was awarded a higher Doctorate of Science by Victoria University of Wellington Council, based on a body of published work conducted in close association with the University from 1976-2020.

== Selected publications ==
- Berridge MV, Ralph RK, Letham DS. The binding of kinetin to plant ribosomes. Biochem J, 119:75-84 (1970). doi:10.1042/bj1190075
- Berridge MV, Ralph RK. Kinetin and carbohydrate metabolism in Chinese cabbages. Plant Physiology, 47:562-567 (1971). doi:10.1104/pp.47.4.562
- Berridge MV, Lane CD. Translation of Xenopus liver messenger RNA in Xenopus oocytes: Vitellogenin synthesis and conversion to yolk platelet proteins. Cell, 8:283-297 (1976). doi:10.1016/0092-8674(76)90012-x,
- Farmer SR, Henshaw EC, Berridge MV, Tata JR. Translation of Xenopus vitellogenin mRNA during primary and secondary induction. Nature, 273:401-403 (1978). doi.org/10.1038/273401a0.
- Berridge MV. A new class of cell surface antigens. Quantitative absorption studies defining cell-lineage-specific antigens on hemopoietic cells. J Exp Med, 150:977-986 (1979). doi:10.1084/jem.150.4.977
- Berridge MV, O'Kech N, McNeilage LJ, Heslop BF, Moore R. Rat mutant (nznu) showing "nude" characteristics. Transplantation, 27:410-413 (1979). PMID 380079.
- Berridge MV, Fraser JK, Carter JM, Lin F-K. Effects of recombinant human erythropoietin on megakaryocytes and on platelet production in the rat. Blood, 72:970-972 (1988). PMID 3416080.
- Ahmed N, Kansara M, Berridge MV. Acute regulation of glucose transport in a monocyte-macrophage cell line: Glut-3 affinity for glucose is enhanced during the respiratory burst. Biochem J 327: 369-375 (1997). doi:10.1042/bj3270369
- Tan AS, Ahmed N, Berridge MV. Acute regulation of glucose transport after activation of human peripheral blood neutrophils by phorbol myristate acetate, fMLP, and granulocyte-macrophage colony-stimulating factor. Blood 91: 649-655 (1998). https://doi.org/10.1182/blood.V91.2.649
- Berridge MV, Tan AS. Characterisation of the cellular reduction of 3-(4,5-dimethylthiazol-2yl)-2,5-diphenyltetrazolium bromide (MTT): Subcellular localization, substrate dependence, and involvement of mitochondrial electron transport in MTT reduction. Archives Biochem Biophys 303:474-482 (1993). doi:10.1006/abbi.1993.1311
- Berridge MV, Herst PM, and Tan AS. Tetrazolium dyes as tools in cell biology: new insights into their cellular reduction. Biotechnology Annual Review, 11: 127-152 (2005). doi:10.13140/2.1.1877.0888
- Herst PM and Berridge MV. Cell surface oxygen consumption: a major contributor to cellular oxygen consumption in glycolytic cancer cell lines. Biochem Biophys Acta: 1767: 170-177 (2007). doi:10.1016/j.bbabio.2006.11.018
- Herst PM, Tan AS, Scarlett D-J and Berridge MV. Cell surface oxygen consumption by mitochondrial gene-knockout cells. Biochem Biophys Acta, 1656: 79-87 (2004). doi:10.1016/j.bbabio.2004.01.008.
- Herst PH, Rowe MR, Carson GM, Berridge MV. Functional mitochondria in health and disease. Frontiers in Endocrinology 8:296 (2017). doi:10.3389/fendo.2017.0029
- Hood KA, West LM, Rouwe B, Northcote PT, Berridge MV, Wakefield StJ, Miller JH. Peloruside A, a novel antimitotic agent with paclitaxel-like microtubule-stabilizing activity. Cancer Research 62: 3356-60 (2002). PMID 12067973.
- Andreani A, Burnelli S. Granaiola M, Leoni A, Locatelli A, Morigi R, Rambaldi M, Varoli L, Landi L, Prata C, Berridge MV, Grasso C, Fiebig H-H, Kelter G, Burger AM, Kunkel MW. Antitumor Activity of Bis-Indole Derivatives. J Med Chem, 51: 4563-4570 (2008). PMID 18598018.
- Tan AS, Baty JW, Dong L-F, Bezawork-Geleta A, Endaya B, Goodwin J, Bajzikova M, Kovarova J, Peterka M, Yan B, Alizadeh Pesdar E, Sobol M, Filimonenko A, Stuart S, Vondrusova M, Kluckova K, Sachaphibulkij K, Rohlena J, Hozak F, Truska J, Eccles D, Haupt L, Griffiths LR, Neuzil J and Berridge MV. Mitochondrial Genome Acquisition Restores Respiratory Function and Tumorigenic Potential of Cancer Cells without Mitochondrial DNA Cell Metabolism 21: 81-94 (2015). doi:10.1016/j.cmet.2014.12.003
- Dong L-F, Kovarova J, Bajzikova M, Bezawork-Geleta A, Svec D, Endaya B, Sachaphibulkij K, Coelho AR, Sebkova N, Ruzickova A, Tan AS, Kluckova K, Judasova K, Zamecnikova K, Rychtarcikova Z, Gopalan V, Andera L, Sobol M, Yan B, Pattnaik B, Bhatraju N, Truksa J, Stopka P, Hozak P, Lam A, Sedlacek, R, Oliveira P, Kubista M, Agrawal A, Dvorakova-Hortova K, Rohlena J, Berridge MV, Neuzil J. Horizontal transfer of whole mitochondria restores tumorigenic potential in mitochondrial DNA-deficient cancer cells. eLife; 6: e22187 (2017). doi:10.7554/eLife.22187
- Bajzikova M, Kovarova J, Coelho AR, Boukalova S, Oh S, Rohlenova K, Svec D, Hubackova S, Endaya B, Judasova K, Bezawork-Geleta A, Kluckova K, Chatre L, Zobalova R, Novakova A, Vanova K, Ezrova Z, Maghzal GJ, Magalhaes Novais S, Olsinova M, Krobova L, An YJ, Davidova E, Nahacka Z, Sobol M, Cunha-Oliveira T, Sandoval-Acuña C, Strnad H, Zhang T, Huynh T, Serafim TL, Hozak P, Sardao VA. Koopman WJH, Ricchetti M, Oliveira PJ, Kolar F, Kubista M, Truksa J, Dvorakova-Hortova K, Pacak K, Gurlich R, Stocker R, Zhou Y, Berridge MV, Park S, Dong L, Rohlena J, Neuzil J. Reactivation of dihydroorotate dehydrogenase-driven pyrimidine biosynthesis restores tumor growth of respiration-deficient cancer cells. Cell Metabolism. 29: 399-416 (2019). doi:10.1016/j.cmet.2018.10.014
- Grasso C, Eccles DA, Boukalova S, Fabre M-S, Dawson RH, Neuzil J, Herst PM, Berridge MV. Mitochondrial DNA affects expression of nuclear genes involved in immune and stress responses in a breast cancer model. Frontiers in Physiology: Mitochondrial Research. 11: 543962 (2020). doi:10.3389/fphys.2020.543962
