= Joan Mattingley =

New Zealand clinical chemist

Joan Muriel Mattingley (married name Cameron; 5 March 1926 – 27 July 2015) was a New Zealand clinical chemist.

Mattingley was born in Wellington on 5 March 1926, and was educated at Wellington Girls' College. When aged 17, she applied to work at the Department of Scientific and Industrial Research but was told that girls could not become botanists "because it required tramping". Mattingley graduated with a Bachelor of Science degree from Victoria University College in 1949, and completed a PhD in biological chemistry from Victoria University of Wellington in 1977. She worked as a clinical chemist, and rose to become the senior scientific officer in the biochemistry research unit at Wellington Hospital.

Mattingley was twice president of the New Zealand Association of Scientists (NZAS) in 1987/88 and 1988/89. During her tenure, the NZAS made many submissions on government restructuring of the New Zealand science system. Mattingley referred to these changes as "extraordinary upheavals" that would devastate New Zealand science and create a "generally confused, bewildered, insecure scientific community".

Her biography of the scientist Brian Shorland was published under her married name, Joan Cameron.

Mattingley died in Paraparaumu on 27 July 2015, having been predeceased by her husband, Charles Cameron.

In 2017, Mattingley was selected as one of the Royal Society Te Apārangi's "150 women in 150 words", celebrating the contributions of women to knowledge in New Zealand.

== Selected publications ==
- Joan Mattingley (1987), The helping agencies = Hei whakamarama : nga ropu awhina. (in English and Māori), Ministry for Women, OCLC 154654858, Wikidata Q104519383
- Mattingley JM (1 June 1986). "Paper chromatography of urinary amino acids. A 30 year survey of dietary influences on the normal pattern, and patients' results". Biomedical Chromatography. 1 (3): 95–100. doi:10.1002/BMC.1130010302. ISSN 0269-3879. PMID 3506825. Wikidata Q36461239.
- Reid JD; MATTINGLEY JM (1 August 1963). "Cholesterol: Phospholipid Ratios in Body Fluids". The New Zealand Medical Journal. 62: 357–359. ISSN 0028-8446. PMID 14050998. Wikidata Q76511198.
- J. M. MATTINGLEY (1 December 1961). "Protein-bound iodine estimation". The New Zealand Medical Journal. 60: 580. ISSN 0028-8446. PMID 14471418. Wikidata Q79007813.
- Carson PD; MATTINGLEY JM (1 March 1960). "Electrophoresis and its application to clinical medicine". The New Zealand Medical Journal. 59: 159–164. ISSN 0028-8446. PMID 13807992. Wikidata Q79185455.
