= Carolyn King (disambiguation) =

Carolyn King was one of the first girls ever to play Little League Baseball, and was the centerpiece in a landmark battle-of-the-sexes lawsuit in 1974.

Carolyn King may also refer to:

- Carolyn King (zoologist), New Zealand zoologist, professor at the University of Waikato, specialising in mammals
- Carolyn Dineen King (born 1938), senior judge of the United States Court of Appeals for the Fifth Circuit
- Carolyn King Justus, American politician, a former Republican member of the North Carolina General Assembly

== See also ==
- Carol King (disambiguation)
