= David A. Wardle =

Ecologist in New Zealand

David A. Wardle FRSNZ
- Born: 1963 (age 62–63)
- Education: University of Calgary
- Scientific career
- Thesis: The Influence of Environmental Variables and Herbicide Application on the Soil Microbial Biomass (1989)
- Doctoral advisor: Dennis Parkinson

David A. Wardle FRSNZ (born 1963) is a Swedish-New Zealand ecologist. He is a professor of ecology at Umeå University in Sweden. After obtaining a Bachelor of Science degree at the University of Canterbury he completed a Doctor of Philosophy degree under Dennis Parkinson at the University of Calgary in 1989, and then worked in New Zealand at Landcare Research before moving to the Swedish University of Agricultural Sciences in Umeå. Wardle is a Fellow of the Royal Society of New Zealand.

In 1999 he was awarded the New Zealand Association of Scientists Research Medal for his ecological work on the associations between above-ground and below-ground communities. He was the recipient of the Te Tohu Taiao – Award for Ecological Excellence from New Zealand Ecological Society in 2001, awarded annually to a New Zealand scientist on the basis of research and application in ecology. In 2010 he became a Wallenberg Scholar.

== Selected works ==
- Communities and Ecosystems: Linking the Aboveground and Belowground Components David A. Wardle, Princeton University Press, 2002. ISBN 0691074860
- Aboveground–Belowground Linkages: Biotic Interactions, Ecosystem Processes, and Global Change David A. Wardle and Richard D. Bardgett, Oxford University Press, 2010. ISBN 9780191591358
