= Robert Poulin =

Evolutionary ecologist

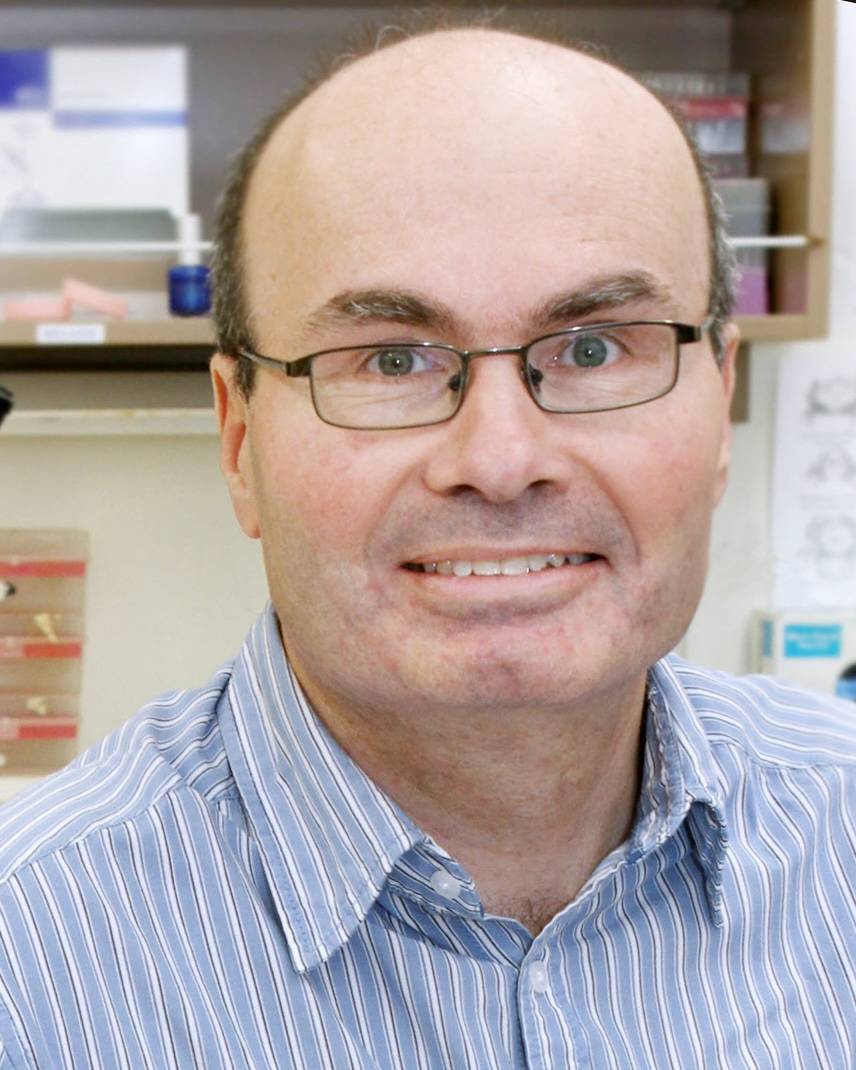
- In 2011
- Born: 1963 (age 62–63); Canada

Academic background
- Education: McGill University; Université Laval

Academic work
- Discipline: Evolutionary ecology
- Sub-discipline: Parasitism specialist
- Institutions: University of Otago

Robert Poulin is an evolutionary ecologist specialising in the ecology of parasitism. He is a professor of zoology at the University of Otago and a Fellow of the Royal Society of New Zealand.

== Biography ==
Robert Poulin grew up in Canada, taking his bachelor's degree in aquatic biology at McGill University, Montreal and gaining his doctorate at Université Laval, Quebec City. He became a researcher in Quebec. He moved to New Zealand in 1992, where he is a professor of zoology, leading a research group studying the ecology of parasites at the University of Otago.

He has written over 450 peer-reviewed journal papers and at least 25 book chapters.

Poulin is married with two sons.

== Awards and distinctions ==
Poulin became a Fellow of the Royal Society of New Zealand in 2001, and won the New Zealand Association of Scientists' Research Medal the same year. In 2002 he was awarded a James Cook Research Fellowship by the Royal Society Te Apārangi. In 2007 he won the Robert Arnold Wardle Award of the Canadian Society of Zoologists. In 2011 he won the Hutton Medal of the Royal Society of New Zealand. He was awarded the University of Otago's Distinguished Research Medal in 2013.

The North African tortoise pinworm Tachygonetria poulini is named for him, as is the New Zealand parasitic fluke Maritrema poulini, and the parasitic cryptogonimid trematode Siphoderina poulini.

== Books ==
=== Authored ===
- Poulin, R., & Morand, S. (2004). Parasite Biodiversity. Smithsonian Books.
- Poulin, R. (2004). Going in Circles: The Complex transmission Routes of Parasites. University of Otago.
- Poulin, R. (2011) [1998]. Evolutionary Ecology of Parasites (2nd ed.). Princeton University Press. (1st ed. Chapman & Hall)

=== Edited ===
- Poulin, R., Morand, S., & Skorping, A. (Eds.). (2000). Evolutionary Biology of Host-Parasite Relationships: Theory meets Reality. Elsevier.
- Poulin, R. (Ed.). (2002). Parasitology – Parasites in Marine Systems (Supplement, No. 124, Parasitology). Cambridge University Press.
- Morand, S., Krasnov, B. R., & Poulin, R. (Eds.). (2006). Micromammals and Macroparasites: From Evolutionary Ecology to Management. Springer.
