= Jadranka Travaš-Sejdić =

New Zealand scientist

Jadranka Travaš-Sejdić FRSNZ
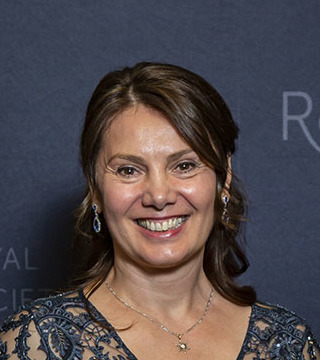
- Education: University of Auckland
- Scientific career
- Fields: Conducting polymers
- Workplaces: University of Auckland
- Thesis: Study of the interactions and structure in polyelectrolyte copolymer gel systems based on acrylamide monomers (1999)
- Website: travas-sejdic.auckland.ac.nz

Jadranka Travaš-Sejdić FRSNZ is a New Zealand academic, and as of 2018 is a professor at the University of Auckland.

== Academic career ==
After an undergraduate at the University of Zagreb in Croatia and a PhD titled 'Study of the interactions and structure in polyelectrolyte copolymer gel systems based on acrylamide monomers' at the University of Auckland, Travaš-Sejdić joined the staff, rising to full professor.

Travaš-Sejdić is co-founder of spin-out Spot Check.

== Honours and awards ==
In 2017, Travaš-Sejdić was elected as a Fellow of the Royal Society of New Zealand. The New Zealand Association of Scientists awarded Travaš-Sejdić the Shorland Medal in 2018, and in 2019, she was awarded the Hector Medal by the Royal Society of New Zealand.

== Selected works ==
- Peng, Hui; Travas-Sejdic, Jadranka (2009). "Simple Aqueous Solution Route to Luminescent Carbogenic Dots from Carbohydrates". Chemistry of Materials. 21 (23): 5563–5565. doi:10.1021/cm901593y.
- Svirskis, Darren; Travas-Sejdic, Jadranka; Rodgers, Anthony; Garg, Sanjay (2010). "Electrochemically controlled drug delivery based on intrinsically conducting polymers". Journal of Controlled Release. 146 (1): 6–15. doi:10.1016/j.jconrel.2010.03.023. hdl:2292/13348. PMID 20359512.
- Peng, Hui; Zhang, Lijuan; Soeller, Christian; Travas-Sejdic, Jadranka (2009). "Conducting polymers for electrochemical DNA sensing". Biomaterials. 30 (11): 2132–2148. doi:10.1016/j.biomaterials.2008.12.065. PMID 19147223.
- Peng, Hui; Zhang, Lijuan; Kjällman, Tanja H. M.; Soeller, Christian; Travas-Sejdic, J. (2007). "DNA Hybridization Detection with Blue Luminescent Quantum Dots and Dye-Labeled Single-Stranded DNA". Journal of the American Chemical Society. 129 (11): 3048–3049. doi:10.1021/ja0685452. PMID 17315877.
- Peng, Hui; Soeller, Christian; Vigar, Nickolas; Kilmartin, Paul A.; Cannell, Mark B.; Bowmaker, Graham A.; Cooney, Ralph P.; Travas-Sejdic, Jadranka (2005). "Label-free electrochemical DNA sensor based on functionalised conducting copolymer". Biosensors and Bioelectronics. 20 (9): 1821–1828. doi:10.1016/j.bios.2004.07.013. PMID 15681199.

== See also ==
- Croatian New Zealanders
