= Robert McLachlan (mathematician) =

New Zealand mathematician

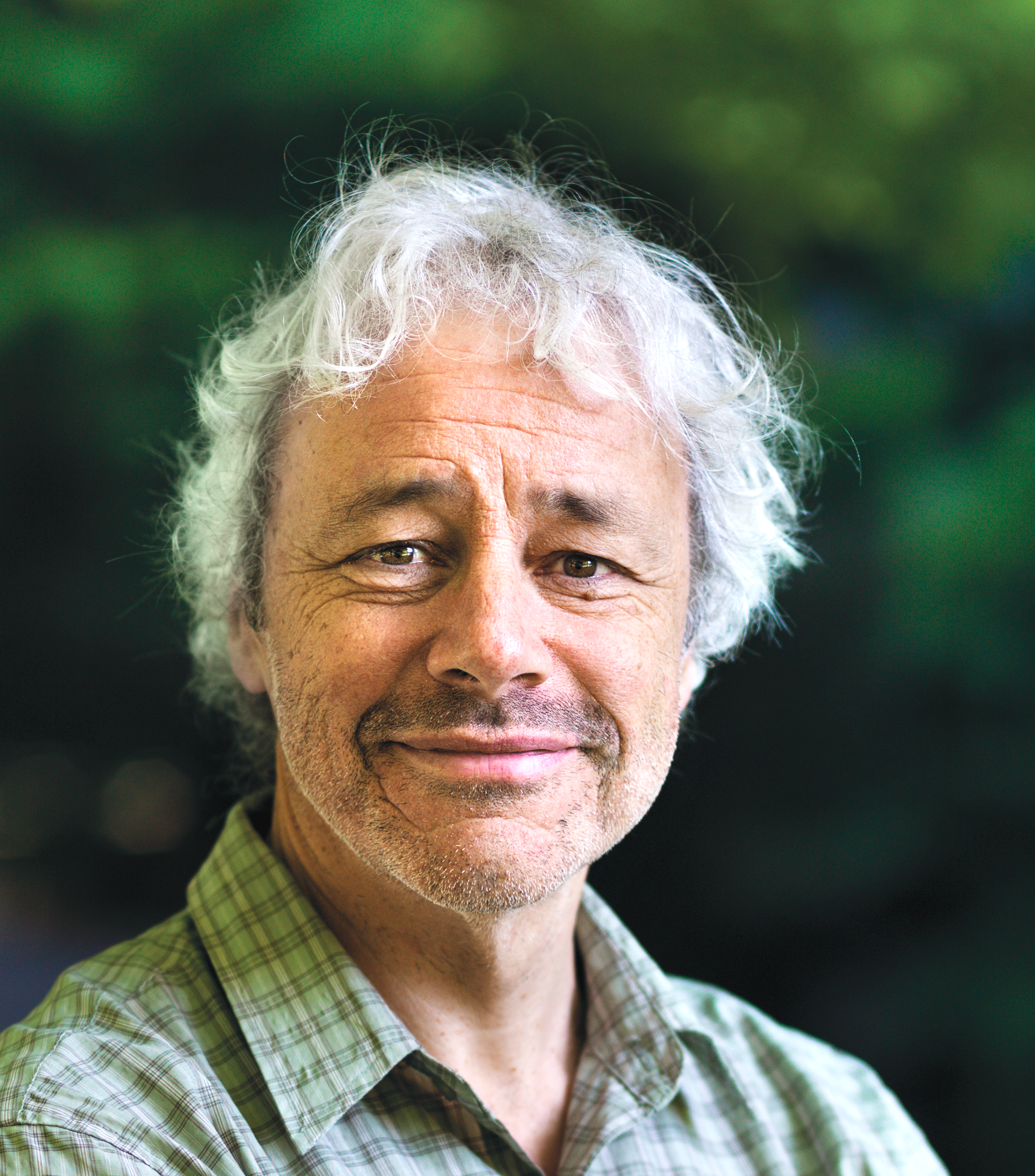
- Born: 1964 (age 61–62); Christchurch, New Zealand
- Known for: Geometric integration

Academic background
- Education: Caltech
- Thesis: Separated Viscous Flows via Multigrid (1990)
- Doctoral advisor: Herbert Keller

Academic work
- Institutions: Massey University

Robert Iain McLachlan FRSNZ (born 1964) is a New Zealand mathematician and Distinguished Professor in the School of Fundamental Sciences, Massey University, New Zealand. His research in geometric integration encompasses both pure and applied mathematics, modelling the structure of systems such as liquids, climate cycles, and quantum mechanics. He also writes for the public on the subject of climate change policy.

== Academic career ==
McLachlan was born in Christchurch, New Zealand in 1964, and studied mathematics at the University of Canterbury, graduating with a BSc (Hons) First Class in 1984. One formative experience was in his last year of high school, where he had free rein to experiment with assembly language programming on the school PDP-11/10.

McLachlan went on to graduate work in numerical analysis in 1986. He received a PhD from Caltech (the California Institute of Technology) in 1990, supervised by Herbert Keller in computational fluid dynamics, with a thesis titled "Separated Viscous Flows via Multigrid". He then worked as a postdoctoral fellow at the University of Colorado Boulder in what was then the new field of symplectic geometry. After meeting Jürgen Moser, who was visiting Boulder at the time, McLachlan spent six months on a postdoctoral fellowship in Switzerland, at the Swiss Federal Institute of Technology in Zurich.

McLachlan joined Massey University in Palmerston North in 1994, and began a collaboration with Reinout Quispel at La Trobe University that resulted in over 26 publications on geometric integration. In 2002 he became Professor of Applied Mathematics at Massey, and spent a year's sabbatical at the University of Geneva, working with Gerhard Wanner and Ernst Hairer, and the Norwegian Academy of Sciences in Oslo. In 2007 he won the prestigious Germund Dahlquist Prize, the first mathematician from the southern hemisphere to do so. From 2008 to 2012, along with Stephen Marsland and Matt Perlmutter, he worked on a Marsden grant project "Geodesics in diffeomorphism groups: geometry and applications", designing efficient numerical integrators that preserved the geometric properties of systems. In 2013, McLachlan was the LMS-NZMS Aitken Lecturer, delivering talks on geometric numerical integration to six UK universities.

McLachlan is a Fellow of the New Zealand Mathematical Society (NZMS), and in 1998 organised the first of the annual Manawatu-Wellington Applied Mathematics Conferences. He was president of the NZMS in 2008–2009 and vice president in 2010, and edited the New Zealand Journal of Mathematics for six years. Since 2016 he has been a Distinguished Professor in Massey's School of Fundamental Sciences.

== Research ==
McLachlan is a world leader in the field of geometric integration, a technique for the reliable simulation of large-scale complex systems, and in particular the use of symplectic techniques in the numerical analysis of differential equations. This field, which McLachlan helped found in the 1990s, builds into its approach the underlying geometric structure of data sets. Because it allows the simulation of large systems, it has the potential for solving practical problems in fields as disparate as the structure of liquids, climate cycles, the motion of the solar system, particles in circular accelerators, chaos in dynamical systems, and weather forecasting. For example, during Hurricane Sandy in 2012, the European Centre for Medium-Range Weather Forecasts, using geometric integration models, correctly predicted the hurricane would suddenly turn 90 degrees towards New York six days in advance. McLachlan's methods have been used in computational science to examine a possible celestial origin of the ice ages, biological models, and the dynamics of flexible structures. His research contributed to a solar system simulation that revised the dates of geophysical epochs by millions of years. Although his work in geometric numerical integration has a wide range of real-world applications, he considers himself a pure mathematician.

== Awards and fellowships ==
- Fellow of the New Zealand Mathematical Society (2001)
- Fellow of the Royal Society of New Zealand (2002)
- NZ Association of Scientists Research Medal (2003)
- NZMS Research Award (2005)
- NZIMA Maclaurin Fellowship (2005)
- SIAM Germund Dahlquist Prize (2007)
- James Cook Research Fellow (2012)
- Research fellow at the Isaac Newton Institute, Cambridge, UK
- Research fellow at the Mathematical Sciences Research Institute, Berkeley, USA
- Research fellow at the Centre for Advanced Study at the Norwegian Academy of Science and Letters, Oslo
- Visiting fellow, Mathematical Research Institute of Oberwolfach, Germany

== Science communication ==
As an advocate for action on climate change McLachlan writes frequently for the public, in media like Scientific American's blog, the blog Planetary Ecology and the Royal Society Te Apārangi's Sciblogs. His writing focuses on consequences of climate change, the benefits of wind turbines, electric cars, and climate policy.

== Selected research ==
- McLachlan, Robert I.; Offen, Christian (2019). "Symplectic integration of boundary value problems". Numerical Algorithms. 81 (4): 1219–1233. arXiv:1804.09042. doi:10.1007/s11075-018-0599-7. S2CID 52297714.
- McLachlan, Robert I.; Modin, Klas; Verdier, Olivier (2014). "Symplectic integrators for spin systems". Physical Review E. 89 (6) 061301. arXiv:1402.4114. Bibcode:2014PhRvE..89f1301M. doi:10.1103/PhysRevE.89.061301. PMID 25019718. S2CID 16838116.
- McLachlan, Robert I.; Quispel, G. Reinout W. (2006). "Geometric integrators for ODEs". Journal of Physics A: Mathematical and General. 39 (19): 5251–5285. Bibcode:2006JPhA...39.5251M. doi:10.1088/0305-4470/39/19/S01.
- McLachlan, Robert I.; Quispel, G. Reinout W. (2002). "Splitting methods". Acta Numerica. 11: 341–434. doi:10.1017/S0962492902000053. S2CID 229168188.
- McLachlan, Robert I. (1995). "On the Numerical Integration of Ordinary Differential Equations by Symmetric Composition Methods". SIAM Journal on Scientific Computing. 16 (1): 151–168. Bibcode:1995SJSC...16..151M. doi:10.1137/0916010.
- Braunstein, Samuel L.; McLachlan, Robert I. (1987). "Generalized squeezing". Physical Review A. 35 (4): 1659–1667. Bibcode:1987PhRvA..35.1659B. doi:10.1103/PhysRevA.35.1659. PMID 9898327. S2CID 42118827.
