= Kim King =

Kim King may refer to:

- Kim King (American football), American college football player
- Kim King (politician), member of the Kentucky House of Representatives
- Carolyn King (zoologist), New Zealand mammalogist
