= Fiona McDonald (physiologist) =

New Zealand physiology academic

- Born: Roxburgh, New Zealand
- Education: University of Otago
- Alma mater: University of Oxford
- Awards: Fulbright scholarship
- Scientific career
- Institutions: University of Otago
- Thesis: Studies on the role of FGF-4 in mouse development (1992)

Fiona Jean McDonald is a New Zealand physiologist, professor and head of the McDonald Lab and the Department of Physiology at the University of Otago.

== Academic career ==
McDonald was born in Roxburgh, New Zealand. After graduating from St Hilda's Collegiate School in Dunedin she completed a BSc at the University of Otago. She then studied at the University of Oxford for a DPhil for her thesis, "Studies on the role of FGF-4 in mouse development". In 2011 McDonald was awarded a Fulbright scholarship to study the function of a protein named COMMD10 at the University of Texas Southwestern Medical Center in Dallas. Returning to her position at Otago, she was promoted to full professor, with effect from 1 February 2020.

== Awards and honours ==
In 2005, McDonald was awarded the Research Medal by the New Zealand Association of Scientists, for "her outstanding physiological research over the last 3 years".

== Selected works ==
- Adam W Ware; Sahib R Rasulov; Tanya T Cheung; Shaun Lott; Fiona J McDonald (28 October 2019). "Membrane trafficking pathways regulating the epithelial sodium channel, ENaC". American Journal of Physiology - Renal Physiology. doi:10.1152/AJPRENAL.00277.2019. ISSN 1931-857X. PMID 31657249. Wikidata Q90966259.
- Tanya T Cheung; Anna C Geda; Adam W Ware; Sahib R Rasulov; Polly Tenci; Kirk L Hamilton; Fiona J McDonald (5 October 2020). "Retromer is involved in epithelial sodium channel trafficking". American Journal of Physiology - Renal Physiology. doi:10.1152/AJPRENAL.00198.2019. ISSN 1931-857X. PMID 33017185. Wikidata Q100444727.
- Puja Paudel; Fiona J McDonald; Martin Fronius (4 December 2020). "The δ subunit of Epithelial sodium channel in humans - a potential player in vascular physiology". American Journal of Physiology Heart and Circulatory Physiology. doi:10.1152/AJPHEART.00800.2020. ISSN 0363-6135. PMID 33275523. Wikidata Q104069083.
- Fiona J McDonald (16 December 2020). "Explosion in the complexity of membrane protein recycling". The American Journal of Physiology - Cell Physiology. doi:10.1152/AJPCELL.00171.2020. ISSN 0363-6143. PMID 33326310. Wikidata Q104483535.
