= Tahu Kukutai =

New Zealand sociologist

Tahu Hera Kukutai FRSNZ
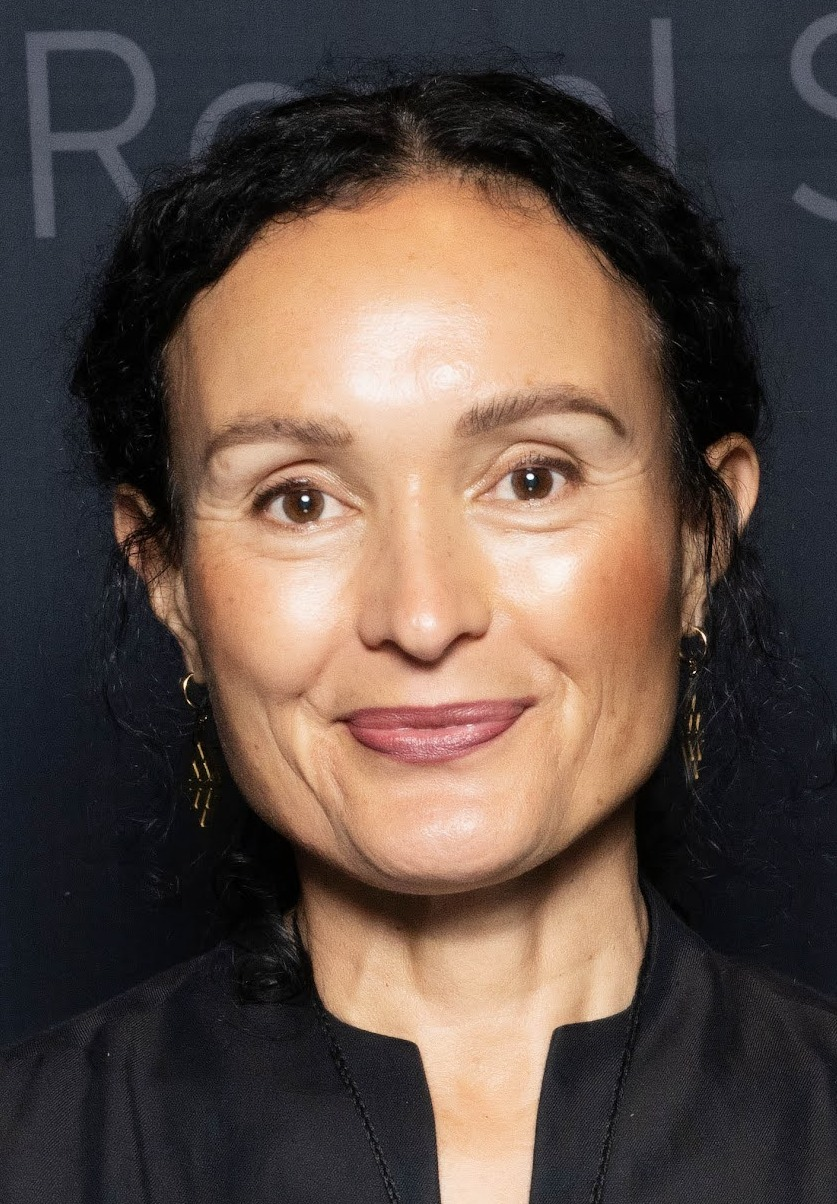
- At 2025 Research Honours Aotearoa
- Born: 1971 (age 54–55)
- Education: Stanford University
- Scientific career
- Fields: Sociology
- Workplaces: University of Waikato
- Thesis: The thin brown line: re-indigenizing inequality in Aotearoa New Zealand (2010)

Tahu Hera Kukutai FRSNZ (born 1971) is a New Zealand sociology academic; she is Māori, of Ngāti Tīpā, Ngāti Mahanga, Ngāti Kinohaku, Ngāti Ngawaero and Te Aupōuri descent, and as of 2019 is a full professor at the University of Waikato. In 2022 Kukutai was elected a Fellow of the Royal Society Te Apārangi.

== Academic career ==
After a 2010 PhD titled The thin brown line: re-indigenizing inequality in Aotearoa New Zealand at Stanford University, Kukutai moved to the University of Waikato, rising to full professor.

In 2022 Kukutai was elected a Fellow of the Royal Society Te Apārangi. The society said "She has undertaken a broad range of applied population research, from iwi projections and demographic profiling, to survey-based analysis of Māori identity and whānau structure. She has published widely on Māori demography and ethnic identity and is recognised internationally for her work on state practices of ethnic and racial classification and census taking."

== Honours and awards ==
In 2023, Kukutai was awarded the New Zealand Association of Scientist's Hill Tinsley Medal. In 2025, she received the Te Rangi Hiroa Medal of the Royal Society Te Apārangi.

== Selected works ==
- Kukutai, Tahu. "The Problem of defining an ethnic group for public policy: Who is Māori and why does it matter?" Social Policy Journal of New Zealand 23 (2004): 86–108.
- Kukutai, Tahu, and John Taylor, eds. Indigenous Data Sovereignty: Toward an Agenda. Vol. 38. Anu Press, 2016.
- Kukutai, Tahu. The Dynamics of Ethnicity Reporting: Maori in New Zealand. Te Puni Kokiri, 2003.
- Kukutai, Tahu H. "White Mothers, Brown Children: Ethnic Identification of Maori‐European Children in New Zealand." Journal of Marriage and Family 69, no. 5 (2007): 1150–1161.
- Kukutai, Tahu, and Paul Callister. "A 'Main' Ethnic Group? Ethnic Self-prioritisation Among New Zealand Youth." Social Policy Journal of New Zealand 36 (2009): 16–31.
- Broman, Patrick and Tahu Kukutai. "Fixed Not Fluid: European Identification in the Aotearoa New Zealand Census." Journal of Population Research 38 (2021): 103–138. doi:10.1007/s12546-021-09262-4
