= Shorland Medal =

New Zealand science award

- Description: Major and continued contribution to basic or applied research
- Country: New Zealand
- Presented by: New Zealand Association of Scientists (NZAS)
- Website: scientists.org.nz/shorland

The Shorland Medal is awarded annually by the New Zealand Association of Scientists in recognition of a "major and continued contribution to basic or applied research that has added significantly to scientific understanding or resulted in significant benefits to society." The medal was established in 1999 and named after Brian Shorland, a New Zealand organic chemist.

== Recipients ==
| Year | Medalist | Field |
|---|---|---|
| 1999 | Michael Corballis | Cognitive neuroscience |
| 2000 | Paul Kibblewhite | Pulp and paper making |
| 2001 | Brian Halton | Strained organic compounds |
| 2002 | Hugh Bibby | Geothermal and volcanic systems |
| 2003 | Kenneth MacKenzie | Chemistry of ceramics |
| 2004 | John McKinnon | Wool chemistry |
| 2005 | Adya Singh | Wood science |
| 2006 | David Parry | Biophysics |
| 2007 | Robin Mitchell | Pathogenic bacteria |
| 2008 | Graeme L. Gainsford | X-ray crystallography |
| 2009 | Alan B. Kaiser | Conduction |
| 2010 | Ken McNatty | Mammalian reproduction |
| 2011 | Harjinder Singh | Milk products |
| 2012 | Michael Hendy | Mathematical phylogeny |
| 2013 | Graham Nugent | Bovine tuberculosis |
| 2014 | Wei Gao | Materials science |
| 2015 | Ian Brown | Materials chemistry |
| 2016 | Antony Braithwaite | Cancer research |
| 2017 | Fetal Physiology and Neuroscience Team: Alistair Gunn; Laura Bennett; Joanne Davidson; Justin Dean; Colin Green | Foetal physiology and neuroscience |
| 2018 | Jadranka Travas-Sejdic | Advanced polymeric and nanomaterials |
| 2019 | The SHIVERS project team members: Sue Huang; Nikki Turner; Michael Baker; Cameron Grant; Adrian Trenholme | Influenza |
| 2020 | Mark Costello | Ocean biodiversity informatics |
| 2021 | Mike Berridge | Cancer cell biology |
| 2022 | Geoffrey Waterhouse | Applications of nanotechnology |
| 2023 | AgResearch Agricultural Greenhouse Gas Inventory Development Team: Cecile de Klein; Tony van der Weerden; Jiafa Luo; Stefan Muetzel; Arjan Jonker | Agricultural greenhouse gas emissions |
| 2024 | Chris Bumby | Materials physics |
| 2025 | Philip Hulme | Ecology and Biosecurity |
