= Mike Berridge =

Mike Berridge may refer to:

- Mike Berridge (biologist), New Zealand cell biologist
- Mike Berridge (rugby union), English rugby union player

== See also ==
- Michael Berridge, British physiologist and biochemist
