= K. T. Achaya =

Indian chemist and nutritionist

Konganda Thammu Achaya
- Born: 6 October 1923; Kollegal, Chamarajnagar, Mysore State (present-day Karnataka, India)
- Died: 5 September 2002 (aged 78)
- Occupations: Oil chemist; food scientist; nutritionist; food historian; food writer

K. T. Achaya (6 October 1923 – 5 September 2002) was an oil chemist, food scientist, nutritionist, and food historian.

He is the author of Indian Food: A Historical Companion, The Food Industries of British India, and A Historical Dictionary of Indian Food.

== Early life and education ==
Konganda Thammu Achaya was on born 6 October 1923 in Kollegal, then part of the Mysore Kingdom (now in Karnataka), into a Kodava family. He graduated in chemistry from the University of Madras in 1943.

Achaya subsequently worked at the Indian Institute of Science for three years, conducting research on oils, fats and foods system. In 1948, he co-authored the book Indian Dairy Products with K. S. Rangappa; a revised edition of the book was reprinted later in 1974. He went on to earn a doctorate from the University of Liverpool in the United Kingdom, where he worked under T. P. Hilditch.

== Career ==
After receiving his Ph.D., Achaya established the School of Fat Chemistry and Technology in Hyderabad, which later evolved into the Indian Institute of Chemical Technology. He researched on cottonseed processing and castor oil derivatives in Regional Research Laboratory in Hyderabad for 22 years starting from 1950. During this time, he published 150 publications and acquired 11 patents. In 1971, he became the executive director of Protein Foods and Nutrition Development Association of India in Mumbai. In 1977, Achaya moved to the Central Food Technological Research Institute (CFTRI), Mysore, as a consultant to the United Nations University (UNU) Programme for advanced training in Food Science and Technology for fellows from developing countries. He retired from CFTRI in 1983 and wrote several books after his retirement.

== Books ==
K. T. Achaya published several books on oil milling and food history of India.

- Oilseeds and Oil Milling in India: A Cultural and Historical Survey (1990)
- GHANI: The Traditional Oil Mill of India (1993)
- The Food Industries of British India (1994)
- The Story of our Food (2000)
- The Food Industries of British India (Oxford University Press, 1994)
- Indian Food: A Historical Companion (Oxford University Press, 1994)
- A Historical Dictionary of Indian Food (Oxford University Press, 1998)
- The Illustrated Foods of India, A-Z (Oxford University Press, 2009)
