= King Carol =

King Carol may refer to:

== Kings ==
- Carol I of Romania (1839–1914), king from 1881 to 1914
- Carol II of Romania (1893–1953), king from 1930 to 1940

== Other uses ==
- King Carol I Bridge, a bridge across the Danube River in Romania
- NMS Regele Carol I (Romanian: HMS King Carol I), Romanian warship from converted passenger ship

== See also ==
- Carol King (disambiguation)
- Carol (disambiguation)
- King (disambiguation)
