= David Officer =

New Zealand organic chemist

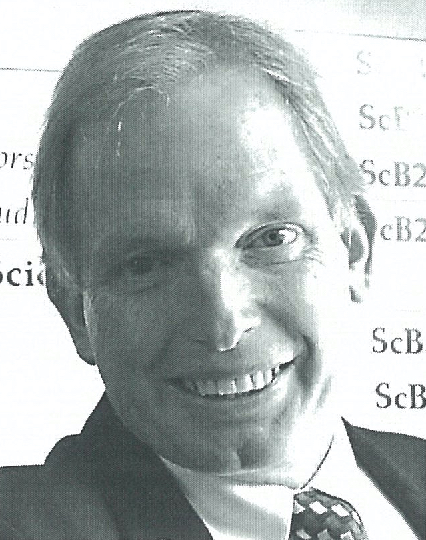
- Born: David Leslie Officer
- Education: Victoria University of Wellington
- Scientific career
- Fields: Organic chemistry, materials science
- Thesis: Studies of some strained organic molecules: cyclopropa phenanthrenes (1981)
- Doctoral advisor: Brian Halton

David Leslie Officer is a New Zealand organic chemist and materials scientist.

He completed a Bachelor of Science (Honours) and PhD at Victoria University of Wellington in 1982 under the direction of Professor Brian Halton, before undertaking postdoctoral positions at the Australian National University, and the University of Cologne (as an Alexander von Humboldt Research Fellow). Officer returned to New Zealand and took up his first academic post at Massey University in 1986, rising through the ranks to full professor. In 2005, Officer was appointed as a fellow of the New Zealand Institute of Chemistry and moved to the MacDiarmid Institute for Advanced Materials and Nanotechnology. Officer is also currently listed as a professorial fellow with the Intelligent Polymer Research Institute and Department of Chemistry at the University of Wollongong, Australia.

== Research interests ==
- Synthesis and use of porphyrins for photovoltaic and molecular devices.
- Development of dye-sensitised solar cells.
- Development and application of functionalised polythiophenes for photovoltaic cells, batteries, actuators and sensors.
- Functionalisation of carbon nanotubes.
