= Jack Heinemann =

American-New Zealand academic (born 1962)

Jack Alfred Heinemann
- Born: 1962 (age 63–64)
- Education: University of Oregon
- Scientific career
- Thesis: Interspecies conjugation between bacteria and yeast (1989)

Jack Alfred Heinemann is an American-New Zealand academic.

== Academic career ==
After an undergrad at University of Wisconsin-Madison Heinemann studied for a PhD from the University of Oregon. He currently works at the University of Canterbury where he is director of the Centre for Integrated Research in Biosafety.

Heinemann is a vocal critic of the way genetic engineered risks are assessed and the benefits are estimated.

In 2002 he received the New Zealand Association of Scientists Research Medal.

In 2004 Heinemann was awarded an Award of Excellence from the Tertiary Education Union and served as Branch President.

== Selected works ==
- Heinemann, J. A., & Sprague Jr, G. F. (1989). Bacterial conjugative plasmids mobilize DNA transfer between bacteria and yeast. Nature, 340(6230), 205–209.
- Kiers, E. T., Leakey, R. R., Izac, A. M., Heinemann, J. A., Rosenthal, E., Nathan, D., & Jiggins, J. (2008). Agriculture at a crossroads. Science, 320(5874), 320.
- Heinemann, J. A. (1991). Genetics of gene transfer between species. Trends in Genetics, 7(6), 181–185.
- Heinemann, J. A., Ankenbauer, R. G., & Amábile-Cuevas, C. F. (2000). Do antibiotics maintain antibiotic resistance?. Drug discovery today, 5(5), 195–204.
- Cooper, T. F., & Heinemann, J. A. (2000). Postsegregational killing does not increase plasmid stability but acts to mediate the exclusion of competing plasmids. Proceedings of the National Academy of Sciences, 97(23), 12643–12648.
