= Brian Halton =

New Zealand organic chemist (1941–2019)

- Born: 9 March 1941; Accrington, Lancashire, England
- Died: 23 February 2019 (aged 77); Wellington, New Zealand
- Citizenship: New Zealander
- Education: University of Southampton
- Spouse: Margaret Leach (m. 1970)
- Children: 2
- Scientific career
- Fields: Organic chemistry
- Workplaces: University of Florida; Victoria University of Wellington
- Thesis: Part I: Addition reactions of a methyleneaziridine. Part II: Conformational aspects of cyclotriveratrylene derivatives (1966)
- Doctoral advisor: Richard Cookson
- Doctoral students: Martin Banwell; David Officer

Brian Halton (9 March 1941 – 23 February 2019) was a New Zealand organic chemist. He is noted for his investigation of highly strained and fused aromatic compounds, and was also active as an historian of chemistry.

== Early life, family and education ==
Born in Accrington, Lancashire, England, on 9 March 1941, Halton was the only child of John Henry Halton and Mary (May) Halton (née Robinson). He contracted bovine tuberculosis as a young child and consequently missed two years of his early education. Later he attended St Joseph's College, Blackpool, and St Joseph's Academy, Blackheath. After winning a state scholarship, Halton studied chemistry at the University of Southampton, graduating BSc(Hons) in 1963. He went on to complete a PhD supervised by Richard Cookson at the same institution in 1966. His two-part thesis was titled Part I: Addition reactions of a methyleneaziridine. Part II: Conformational aspects of cyclotriveratrylene derivatives.

Halton moved to Wellington, New Zealand, in 1968, and married Margaret Leach in 1970. The couple went on to have two children. In 1980, Halton became a naturalised New Zealander.

== Academic and research career ==
After two years of post-doctoral research with Merle Battiste at the University of Florida, where he worked on small ring chemistry, Halton was appointed as a faculty member in the Department of Chemistry at Victoria University of Wellington in 1968, eventually rising to become a full professor. When he retired in 2004, he was conferred the title of professor emeritus.

Halton's research was centred on the synthesis and investigation of highly strained and fused aromatic compounds and their unstable cyclopropanated derivatives, known as cycloproparenes, which included highly strained didehydrobenzenes and some exceptionally fluorescent compounds. in 1987, Halton was conferred with the degree of Doctor of Science by Victoria University of Wellington, on the basis of his submission of 57 papers, collectively titled Studies of some strained organic molecules, published between 1971 and 1987.

Halton was active in the New Zealand Institute of Chemistry (NZIC), serving as chair of the Wellington branch, editor of Chemistry in New Zealand between 2002 and 2012, and president of the NZIC from 1986 to 1987. He represented New Zealand on the organising committee of Pacifichem, the international chemical congress of Pacific basin societies, for 18 years.

Halton is credited with coining the name "ChemScrapes", a series of chemistry cartoons.

== Later life and death ==
Following his retirement, he pursued his interest in the history of chemistry. He wrote a history of the chemistry department at Victoria University, first published in 2012, with later editions in 2014 and 2018, and a collection of short biographies of notable chemists from Lancashire, published in 2015 as A legacy of Lancashire: its chemists, biochemists and industrialists. He also wrote an autobiography, From Coronation Street to a consummate chemist, published in 2011.

Halton died in Wellington on 23 February 2019.

== Honours and awards ==
The New Zealand Association of Scientists awarded Halton its Research Medal in 1974, and the Shorland Medal in 2001. In 1980, he received the ICI Medal for excellence in chemical research from the NZIC. Halton was elected a Fellow of the New Zealand Institute of Chemistry in 1977, and a Fellow of the Royal Society of New Zealand in 1992. In 2005, he was awarded an honorary fellowship of the NZIC.
