= Nicola Gaston =

New Zealand chemist

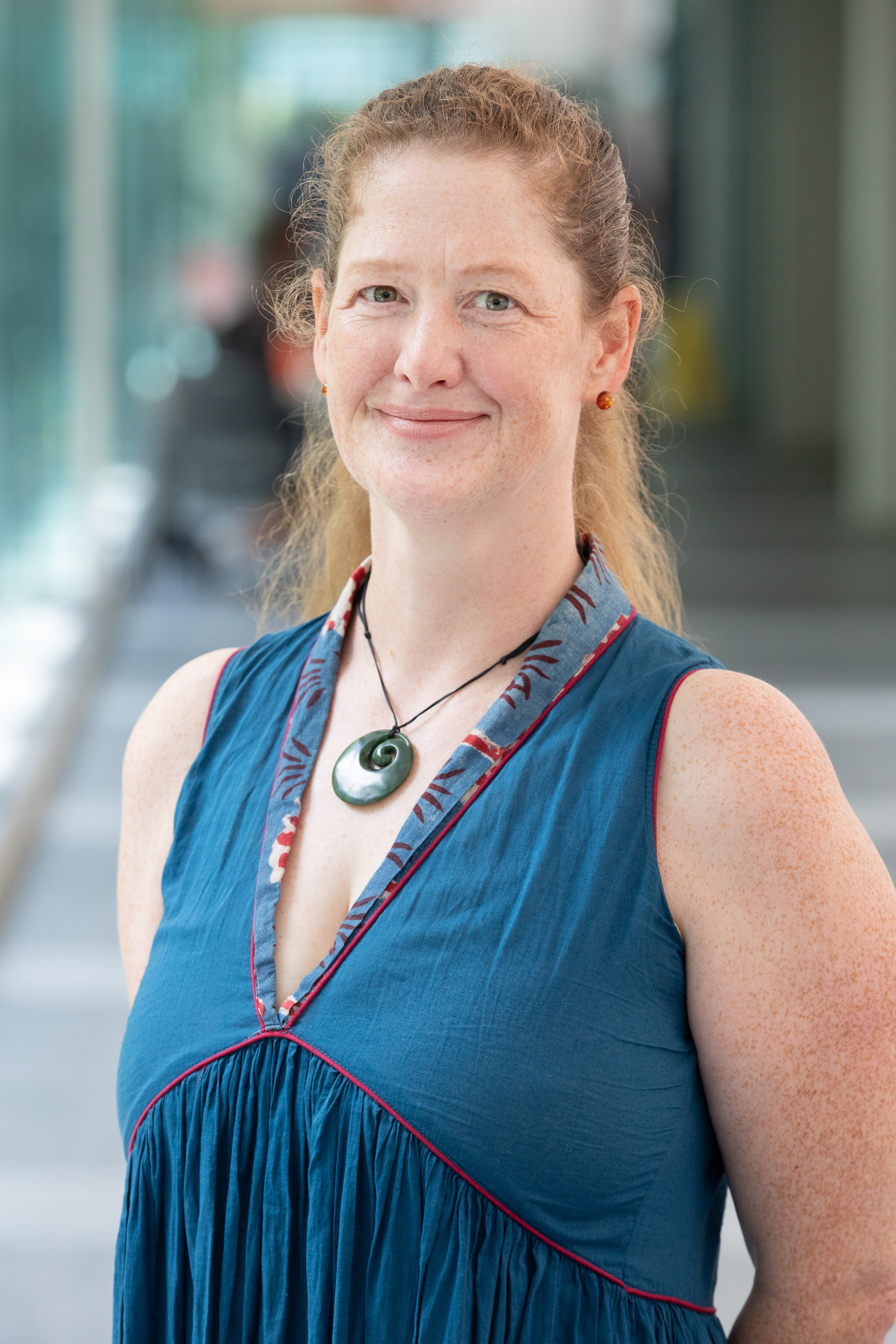
- Gaston in 2025
- Education: University of Auckland, Massey University
- Scientific career
- Fields: Chemistry, Physics
- Workplaces: Auckland University, MacDiarmid Institute for Advanced Materials and Nanotechnology, Victoria University of Wellington
- Website: http://macdiarmid.ac.nz/, http://whyscienceissexist.wordpress.com/

Nicola Gaston FRSNZ is a Professor at the University of Auckland, former President of the New Zealand Association of Scientists, and Director of the MacDiarmid Institute for Advanced Materials and Nanotechnology. She is a materials scientist who has worked on nanoparticles and low-temperature liquid metals, and who has spoken out on sexism in the scientific research establishment. In 2023 she was awarded the Thomson Medal and in 2024 was elected a Fellow of the Royal Society Te Apārangi.

== Academic career ==
Gaston obtained a PhD from Massey University under the supervision of Professor Peter Schwerdtfeger in 2005. She is today a Professor in the Department of Physics at the University of Auckland. She was previously a Senior Lecturer in the School of Chemical and Physical Sciences at Victoria University of Wellington.

After becoming a Principal Investigator at the MacDiarmid Institute for Advanced Materials and Nanotechnology in 2010, she was appointed co-director with Justin Hodgkiss in 2018 and since January 2025 has been the institute's Director.

Her research interests include understanding how and why the properties of clusters of atoms, such as their melting points, depend on size and electronic structure. For example, adding an extra atom of gallium to a cluster can change its melting point by 100 Kelvins. The anomalously high melting temperatures of gallium nanoparticles have been shown to be due to a lower entropy of the liquid state.

Her work on structural self-organisation and pattern formation at the surface of and within low-temperature liquid metals has led to the discovery of structures such as snowflakes, made of zinc metal.

== Awards ==
Gaston was awarded the CMMSE prize in 2016 for important contributions in the developments of numerical methods for physics, chemistry, engineering and economics. In 2023, she was awarded the Thomson Medal by the Royal Society Te Apārangi in recognition of her leadership in highlighting and addressing gender equity issues in the science sector, in supporting researchers to speak out for the public good, as well as for her work as co-director of the MacDiarmid Institute and as president of the New Zealand Association of Scientists. In 2024 Gaston was elected a Fellow of the Royal Society Te Apārangi for her work on low-temperature liquid metals.

== Public profile and advocacy for science ==
Gaston has been a strong advocate for women in science, arguing that science is sexist in national media. She argues that although women may be well-represented in junior university positions, even forming the majority in some scientific disciplines, through unconscious bias or stereotyping they are lost to academia, which ends up dominated by men in senior positions. One reason is the unforgiving nature of the research establishment to gaps in a CV caused by child-rearing. Gaston explored these impediments to the participation of women scientists in her blog, "Why Science is Sexist", and in 2015 published a book of the same name with Bridget Williams Books.

As President of the New Zealand Association of Scientists Gaston publicly criticised the adoption of the National Science Challenges, due to the possible conflicting roles of the Prime Minister's Science Advisor and the marginalisation of Māori. She however subsequently praised the stability of funding provided for the National Science Challenges as well as the development of the National Statement of Science Investment in mitigating some of the concerns surrounding the adoption of the National Science Challenges.

In her role as co-director and the director of the MacDiarmid Institute, Gaston has argued that government investment in cleantech industries should be ambitious, to take advantage of the country's natural advantages in renewable energy. She has challenged New Zealand's focus on the mining critical minerals, promoting recent research into the recycling and recovery of materials like zinc and lithium, and advocating substitution of more common materials through better design.

In 2023 Gaston was highly critical of the government's failure to deliver on their long-held goal of increasing R&D funding to 2% of GDP. She subsequently argued that a lack of investment would lead to an inevitable downsizing of the university sector, without any strategic direction, and that this would lead to a loss of capability and capacity. In 2024, in advance of the government's review of the university sector, she argued for the role of universities in countering the 'brain drain' of highly educated people from the country. She has also argued for the value of investment in science and education as a positive sum game.

== Selected publications ==
- Gaston, Nicola (2015). Why science is sexist. Wellington, New Zealand. ISBN 978-0-908321-65-0. OCLC 930464967.
