= Kathryn McGrath =

New Zealand chemical scientist

- Education: Australian National University
- Scientific career
- Fields: Physical chemistry
- Workplaces: University of Otago; Victoria University of Wellington; University of Technology Sydney
- Thesis: Polymerisation of surfactant lyotropic liquid crystalline phases (1994)
- Doctoral advisors: Calum Drummond; Stephen Hyde
- Website: UTS profile

Kathryn McGrath is a New Zealand chemical scientist. She is deputy vice-chancellor (research) at the University of Technology Sydney, Australia.

== Biography ==
McGrath was educated at Burnside High School in Christchurch, and went on to study at the University of Canterbury, where she completed a BSc(Hons) degree in chemistry. She then earned a PhD at the Australian National University in Canberra. Her thesis focused on the properties of liquid crystals. After completing her doctoral studies, she held postdoctoral positions at Pierre and Marie Curie University in Paris, and Princeton University in the United States.

On returning to New Zealand, McGrath lectured in chemistry at the University of Otago in Dunedin, where she also completed a postgraduate diploma in finance. In 2004, she moved to Victoria University of Wellington where she lectured in the School of Chemical and Physical Sciences, and rose to the rank of full professor. She also held the position of vice-provost (research) and in 2011 was appointed director of the MacDiarmid Institute for Advanced Materials and Nanotechnology. In 2018, she moved to the University of Technology Sydney.

=== Recognition ===
McGrath was awarded the Easterfield Medal by the New Zealand Institute of Chemistry in 2003, and the Research Medal (now Hill Tinsley Medal) by the New Zealand Association of Scientists in 2007. In 2013, she received the Wellington City Council's Gold Inspire Wellington Award. McGrath is a Fellow of the New Zealand Institute of Chemistry.
