= Eugene Goldwasser =

American biochemist (1922–2010)

- Born: October 14, 1922; Brooklyn, New York
- Died: December 17, 2010 (aged 88); Chicago
- Education: University of Chicago (PhD 1950)
- Known for: Identifying erythropoietin
- Spouse(s): Florence Cohen (died 1981), Deone Jackman
- Children: Three sons from first marriage
- Scientific career
- Fields: Biochemistry
- Institutions: Fort Detrick, University of Chicago

Eugene Goldwasser (October 14, 1922 – December 17, 2010) was an American biochemist at the University of Chicago who identified erythropoietin, a hormone that plays a vital role in the synthesis of red blood cells. After sharing the minute quantities that he had been able to isolate with researchers at the biotechnology firm Amgen, that company was able to use genetic engineering technology to produce useful amounts of erythropoietin as a drug to treat anemia that has achieved substantial financial success, but that has also been used by athletes as a performance-enhancing drug.

== Early life and education ==
Goldwasser was born on October 14, 1922, in Brooklyn, New York, and moved with his family to Kansas City, Missouri following the collapse of his father's clothing company. He received a scholarship to attend the University of Chicago and worked at the school's defense-oriented toxicity laboratory during World War II before earning his undergraduate degree in biochemistry in 1943. Goldwasser served for two years at Fort Detrick, home of the United States biological weapons program, studying anthrax after being drafted by the United States Army in 1944. He earned his doctorate in biochemistry in 1950 after returning to the University of Chicago.

== Career in biochemistry ==
Hypotheses had been made in the early 20th century that there was a substance that triggered the body to produce more red blood cells, but no one had been able to identify a material that matched the description. In 1955, hematologist Leon O. Jacobson challenged Goldwasser to begin a search for the red blood cell-promoting substance, a task that Goldwasser assumed could be accomplished in a few months. His initial approach involved the step-by-step removal of different organs from laboratory rats, leading to the conclusion that anemia resulted from a substance produced in the kidneys. Though the discovery of where the material was produced was made in 1957, it took Goldwasser and his team another 15 years before they were able to isolate eight milligrams of erythropoietin from material that had been precipitated from 2,500 litres (550 imp gal; 660 US gal) of urine from anemia patients by Japanese researcher Takaji Miyake. Results of Goldwasser's research, which had been funded by grants from the National Institutes of Health, were first published in 1977 in the Journal of Biological Chemistry. University of Chicago biochemist Donald F. Steiner called the discovery "one of the great contributions to science or medicine of the 20th century, comparable to the discovery of insulin". Goldwasser had submitted a patent disclosure form, though the University of Chicago never pursued a patent.

After providing a sample of the purified erythropoietin to researchers at Amgen, a team there led by Fu-Kuen Lin was able to identify and patent the gene that produced erythropoietin and was able to generate useful quantities of human erythropoietin by using genetic engineering techniques to insert the gene into hamster cells. After successful tests on patients undergoing dialysis, Epoetin alfa, marketed by Amgen under the trade name Epogen starting in 1989, became a financial success, generating a billion-dollar market for Amgen and other companies that had developed their own versions of erythropoietin, though Goldwasser would say that "the enormous clinical success of Epo still astonishes me". Goldwasser didn't receive any royalties from Amgen and noted that having received "one percent of one percent of the drug's annual revenues would have funded my lab quite handsomely" before his retirement from the university in 2002. Goldwasser faced criticism for turning over his government-funded research results to Amgen, though he wrote in 1996 that he had received permission from the NIH.

In subsequent years erythropoietin has faced controversy for its use as a performance-enhancing drug, particularly in long-distance bicycle racing, where participants have been found to have used erythropoietin as a means to increase endurance. Floyd Landis admitted to using erythropoietin and other performance-enhancing substances during his professional career, and was stripped of his title as winner of the 2006 Tour de France.

A resident of Hyde Park, Chicago, Goldwasser died at his home there at the age of 88 on December 17, 2010, due to renal failure that occurred as a complication of prostate cancer. He was survived by his second wife, Deone Jackman; three sons from his first marriage, Thomas, of San Francisco, Matthew, of Chicago, and James, of New York; and five grandchildren. His first wife, Florence Cohen, died in 1981. His memoir, A Bloody Long Journey: Erythropoietin (Epo) and the Person Who Isolated It, (ISBN 978-1-4568-5736-3) was published in 2011.
