= Martin Banwell =

New Zealand-Australian chemist

Professor Martin Banwell AO FAA FRACI HonFRSNZ
- Born: 24 November 1954 (age 71); Lower Hutt, New Zealand
- Citizenship: Australian, New Zealander
- Scientific career
- Fields: Organic Chemist
- Workplaces: ANU Research School of Chemistry
- Thesis: Studies of Some Strained-Ring Systems: Tricyclo-Octanes (1979)

Martin Gerhardt Banwell (born 24 November 1954) is an organic chemist specialising in biotransformations and natural product synthesis.

His research interests involve the enzymatic preparation of organic molecules as synthons or building blocks for complex natural products. This technology/methodology is then applied to the synthesis of complex marine natural products from the Great Barrier Reef.

== Career history ==
Martin received a BSc at Victoria University of Wellington in 1976, and an Honours, 1st Class from the same institution in 1977; his doctorate in 1979 is also from Victoria University, under the direction of Brian Halton.

Banwell relocated to Ohio State University between 1979–1980 to undertake a post-doctoral fellowship before taking on the role of Senior teaching Fellow at the Department of Organic Chemistry, University of Adelaide until 1981.

Banwell then returned to New Zealand taking the role of Lecturer in Chemistry at the University of Auckland until 1986, when he returned to Australia to take a similar role at the Department of Organic Chemistry at the University of Melbourne. In 1995, as an Associate Professor he moved to the Australian National University as a Senior Fellow. He was promoted to full professor in 1999.

Banwell has also previously been a guest at Swiss Federal Institute of Technology (ETH), Zürich, Switzerland. Currently Prof. Banwell is a Foreign Visiting Researcher at Hiroshima University, an Asia-Pacific Representative, Advisory Board to the International Society for Heterocyclic Chemistry, a Chemistry Consultant for CSIRO Molecular Science and Member, Australian Research Council College of Experts.

Banwell currently serves on the editorial boards for several journals such as Tetrahedron.

== Publications ==
To date Prof. Banwell has published 206 peer reviewed articles, 6 patents, 1 review and 1 non-refereed publication.

== Fellowships and awards ==
Banwell has been awarded numerous Fellowships and Awards including;

- Rennie Medal of the Royal Australian Chemical Institute. (1986)
- Grimwade Prize in Industrial Chemistry from the University of Melbourne (1992)
- Elected Fellow of the Royal Australian Chemical Institute (FRACI). (1992)
- Royal Society of Chemistry (U.K.) International Author Travel Grant Awardee. (1998)
- Tasmanian Alkaloid Lectureship of the University of Tasmania (1998)
- Japan Society for the Promotion of Science Fellowship. (1999)
- Humboldt Research Awardee of the Alexander von Humboldt Foundation, Germany. (2000)
- Elected Honorary Fellow of the Royal Society of New Zealand. 2002: Conference Chair, 2002 Southern Highlands Conference on Heterocyclic Chemistry. (2002)
- Royal Society of Chemistry (UK)
- Royal Award in Synthetic Organic Chemistry (2003)
- Nanjing University of Science and Technology International Exchange and Co-operation Lecturer, Nanjing, China, 19–21 May 2004. (2004)
- 2004 Boehringer Ingelheim Lecturer of the Ohio State University, 10 June, (2004).
- Elected fellow of the Australian Academy of Science. (2004)
- 2004–2005 Novartis Chemistry Lecturer (2004)
- Birch Medal of the Royal Australian Chemical Institute (2004)
- 2005 Merck Lecturer (UK) (2005)
- 2018 awarded an Officer of the Order of Australia for "distinguished service to science education as an academic, author and researcher, particularly in the field of synthetic organic chemistry, to scientific institutes, and as a mentor of emerging scientists".

== Representative publications ==
- Austin KA, Banwell MG, Loong DT, Rae AD, Willis AC (March 2005). "A chemoenzymatic total synthesis of the undecenolide (−)-cladospolide B via a mid-stage ring-closing metathesis and a late-stage photo-rearrangement of the E-isomer". Org. Biomol. Chem. 3 (6): 1081–8. doi:10.1039/b417685e. PMID 15750652.
- Freeman C, Liu L, Banwell MG, et al. (March 2005). "Use of sulfated linked cyclitols as heparan sulfate mimetics to probe the heparin/heparan sulfate binding specificity of proteins". J. Biol. Chem. 280 (10): 8842–9. doi:10.1074/jbc.M410769200. PMID 15632177.
- Banwell MG, Edwards AJ, Lupton DW, Whited G (2005). "Whole-Cell Biotransformation of m-Ethyltoluene into 1S,6R-5-Ethyl-1,6-dihydroxycyclohexa-2,4-diene-1-carboxylic Acid as an Approach to the C-Ring of the Binary Indole-Indoline Alkaloid Vinblastine". Aust. J. Chem. 58 (1): 14–17. doi:10.1071/CH04185.
- Banwell MG, Lupton DW (January 2005). "Exploiting the palladium[0]-catalysed Ullmann cross-coupling reaction in natural products chemistry: application to a total synthesis of the alkaloid (±)-aspidospermidine". Org. Biomol. Chem. 3 (2): 213–5. doi:10.1039/b415977b. PMID 15632959.
- Banwell MG, Hungerford NL, Jolliffe KA (August 2004). "Synthesis of the sialic acid (−)-KDN and certain epimers from (−)-3-dehydroshikimic acid or (−)-quinic acid". Org. Lett. 6 (16): 2737–40. doi:10.1021/ol049048y. PMID 15281757.
