= David Gottlieb (biologist) =

American botanist (1911–1982)

- Born: 1911
- Died: 1982 (aged 70–71)
- Citizenship: American
- Known for: isolation strain of Streptomyces
- Scientific career
- Fields: Phytopathology
- Institutions: University of Illinois at Urbana-Champaign
- Doctoral students: Fu-Kuen Lin

David Gottlieb (1911–1982) was an American botanist who was a professor of plant pathology at the University of Illinois at Urbana-Champaign (1946–1982), and a pioneer in the field of fungal physiology and antibiotics for plants.

Gottlieb is best known for isolation in the 1940s of the strain of Streptomyces from which chloramphenicol was developed, for his mentoring in the field, and for his editorial work. He used plant-pathogenic fungi in studies of sterol biosynthesis, respiration, aging, spore germination, and the mechanism of action of antifungal antibiotics. Gottlieb discovered or co-discovered several new antibiotics in addition to chloramphenicol, including filipin, levomycin, and tetrin, and he described the mechanism of action and biosynthesis of several of these and other antibiotics.

== Honors ==
- Guggenheim Fellow, Biology-Plant Science, 1963.
- Fellow, The American Phytopathological Society, 1966.
- Editor for the Annual Review of Phytopathology, 1969–1974.

In his memory, the "David Gottlieb Memorial Award" is given by the University of Illinois at Urbana-Champaign for outstanding published research on the biochemistry of plant diseases or plant pathogens, through the Mining for anti-infectious Molecules from Genomes research theme at the Carl R. Woese Institute for Genomic Biology.

== Publications ==
- Gottlieb, D. (Jan. 1961) "'An Evaluation of Criteria and Procedures Used in the Description and Characterization of the Streptomycetes: A Cooperative Study" Appl Microbiol. 9(1): 55–65.
- Gottlieb, D. (1974) "Germination of fungal spores: Biochemical processes during spore germination, Carbohydrate metabolism" 2nd International Symposium on the Fungus Spore.
