= Brian Shorland =

New Zealand organic chemist (1909–1999)

Brian Shorland OBE
- Born: Francis Brian Shorland; 14 July 1909; Island Bay, Wellington, New Zealand
- Died: 8 June 1999 (aged 89); Karaka Bay, Seatoun, Wellington, New Zealand
- Education: University of Liverpool
- Awards: Hector Medal (1955); OBE (1959)
- Scientific career
- Workplaces: Department of Scientific and Industrial Research
- Thesis: The composition of some New Zealand fats with special reference to fish oils (1937)
- Doctoral advisor: Thomas Percy Hilditch

Francis Brian Shorland OBE (14 July 1909 – 8 June 1999) was a New Zealand organic chemist.

== Biography ==
After a BSc and a MSc in organic chemistry he worked for the Department of Scientific and Industrial Research, before earning a scholarship to go to the University of Liverpool for a PhD under Thomas Percy Hilditch, studying fish liver oils and fats from farm animals.

After his retirement in 1969, he held several honorary posts at Victoria University of Wellington. He died on 8 June 1999 and was cremated at Karori Crematorium.

== Honours and awards ==
He was awarded a DSc by the University of Liverpool in 1950 and an honorary DSc by Victoria University of Wellington in 1970; a Fellowship of the Royal Society of New Zealand in 1951 and the Hector Medal in 1955. In the 1959 New Year Honours he was appointed an Officer of the Order of the British Empire, in recognition of his role as director of the Fats Research Institute, and in 1990 he received the New Zealand 1990 Commemoration Medal. In 1969 he was awarded an honorary fellowship of the New Zealand Institute of Food Science and Technology.

== Shorland Medal ==
In 1999 the New Zealand Association of Scientists established the Shorland Medal in Shorland's honour. It is awarded annually in recognition of a "major and continued contribution to basic or applied research that has added significantly to scientific understanding or resulted in significant benefits to society."
