= Leon O. Jacobson =

American physician

Dr. Leon Orris Jacobson (December 16, 1911 – September 20, 1992) was an American physician, hematologist, radiologist and medical researcher. He was professor emeritus of biology and medicine at the University of Chicago and made notable contributions to the study of radiology and hematology, with major impacts on chemotherapy and radiotherapy.

== Biography ==
Leon Orris Jacobson was born in Sims, North Dakota. In 1935, Jacobson graduated from North Dakota State University and from the University of Chicago medical school in 1939. In 1942, he joined the staff of the Manhattan Project at the University of Chicago. From 1945, Jacobson worked as an assistant professor of medicine at the University of Chicago. In 1951, Jacobson joined the staff of Argonne Cancer Research Hospital, now known as the Franklin McLean Memorial Research Institute, as professor of Medicine and head of hematology. In 1961, Jacobson became the chairman of the University of Chicago Department of Medicine.

Jacobson was elected to the National Academy of Sciences (1965), American Academy of Arts and Sciences (1967), and Institute of Medicine (1970). He was a recipient of the Theodore Roosevelt Rough Rider Award (1976). Leon Jacobson died at the University of Chicago Hospital on September 18, 1992.

== Other sources ==
- Goldwasser, Eugene "Jake. Leon O. Jacobson, M.D. The life and work of a distinguished medical scientist," Science History Publications, 2006. ISBN 0-88135-279-9.
- Atomic Heritage Foundation. Leon O. Jacobson. Profiles, Manhattan Project Veterans Database.
- Eugene Goldwasser (1996). LEON ORRIS JACOBSON. National Academy of Sciences Biographical Memoir. National Academies Press, Washington, D.C.
- Seaborg, G. T. (1992). Journal of Glenn T. Seaborg: Chief, Section C-1, Metallurgical Laboratory, Manhattan Engineer District, 1942-46 (Volume 3). - Report Number: PUB-112 Vol.3 Rev. Lawrence Berkeley Laboratory, University of California
- Seaborg, G. T. (1992). Journal of Glenn T. Seaborg: Chief, Section C-1, Metallurgical Laboratory, Manhattan Engineer District, 1942-46 (Volume 4). - Report Number: PUB-112 Vol.4 Rev. Lawrence Berkeley Laboratory, University of California
