= Richard Blaikie =

New Zealand physicist (born 1965)

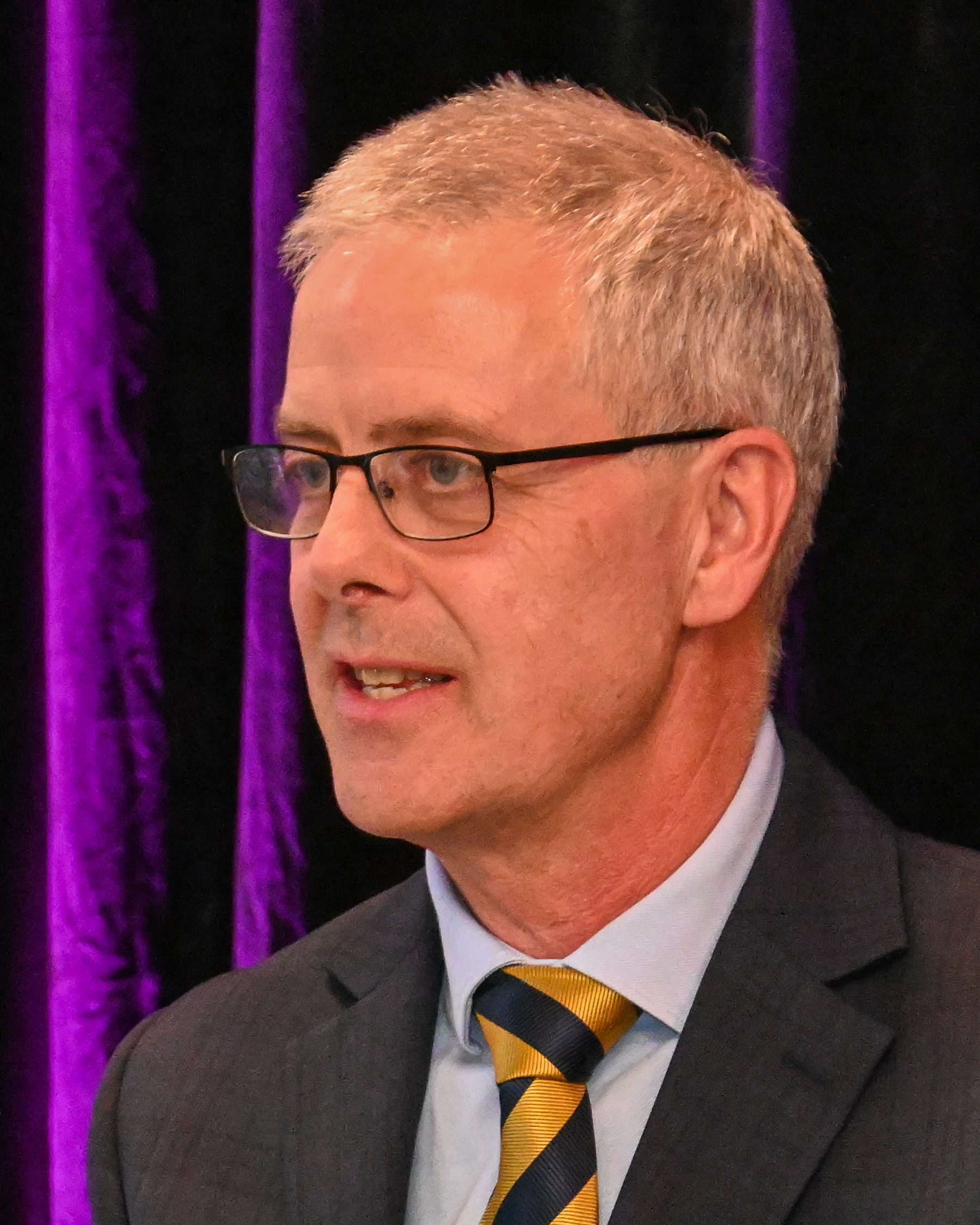
Blaikie in 2023

Richard John Blaikie (born 25 August 1965) is a physicist who works in the field of nano-scale optics. He was Deputy Vice-Chancellor (Research and Enterprise) at the University of Otago until June 2025, and is now Professor Emeritus at the Department of Physics.

== Early life ==
Blaikie was born in 1965 and attended Kaikorai Valley College in Dunedin. He studied at the University of Otago (1984–1987) and graduated with a BSc (Hons) in physics. He won a Rutherford Memorial Scholarship to attend the University of Cambridge (1988–1992), where he received a PhD in physics in 1992.

== Academic career ==
After a year at the Hitachi Cambridge Laboratory, he took a position as a lecturer at the University of Canterbury. He was at Canterbury from February 1994 to November 2011, and he was made a professor during that time. In 2001, he was a Fulbright Fellow at the Massachusetts Institute of Technology.

When the MacDiarmid Institute for Advanced Materials and Nanotechnology was formed in 2002, he was appointed Deputy Director under Professor Paul Callaghan. When Callaghan retired in 2008, Blaikie was appointed Director. During his tenure, the institute received a bequest of NZ$1 million. Blaikie stepped down from the MacDiarmid Institute half way through 2011 when he received his appointment as Deputy Vice-Chancellor (Research and Enterprise) at the University of Otago. He took up the role in December 2011, succeeding Harlene Hayne. He also holds a chair in physics.

Blaikie received the T. K. Sidey Medal in 2001, set up by the Royal Society of New Zealand as an award for outstanding scientific research. In 2011, Blaikie was elected fellow of the Royal Society of New Zealand. In 2013, Blaikie received the Hector Memorial Medal from the Royal Society "for his fundamental and wide-ranging contributions to the field of nano-optics, showing that light can be manipulated at scales much smaller than its wavelength and providing a world-first demonstration of a controversial superlens system using subwavelength techniques." The national ceremony for a range of Royal Society awards were held in the Dunedin Town Hall on 27 November 2013. In 2015, Blaikie was awarded the Thomson Medal for science leadership.
