= Hill Tinsley Medal =

Science award in New Zealand

The Hill Tinsley Medal is an annual award, conferred by the New Zealand Association of Scientists for "outstanding fundamental or applied research in the physical, natural or social sciences published by a scientist or scientists within 15 years of their PhD". The medal was first awarded in 1997. It is named for astronomer and cosmologist Beatrice Hill Tinsley. Prior to 2016, the medal was called the Research Medal.

== Recipients ==
Year	Recipient	Workplace	Field of work
1997	Grant Williams	Industrial Research Limited	Origin of superconductivity in high temperature superconducting cuprates
1998	Anthony Burrell	Massey University	New ways to produce cheap energy through chemistry
1999	David Wardle	Manaaki Whenua – Landcare Research	Ecology of above-ground and below-ground communities
2000	Michael Murphy	University of Otago	How damage to mitochondria contributes to human diseases
2001	Robert Poulin	University of Otago	Evolutionary ecology of parasites
2002	Jack Heinemann	University of Canterbury	Horizontal gene transfer in bacteria and the biology of genetic elements outside chromosomes
2003	Robert McLachlan	Massey University	Geometric integration
2004	Richie Poulton	University of Otago	How adult health is related to socio-economic status in childhood
2005	Fiona McDonald	University of Otago	Proteins that regulate the activity of the sodium channel in kidneys
2006	Jamin Halberstadt	University of Otago	How emotional responses influence social cognition
2007	Kathryn McGrath	Victoria University of Wellington	How molecular self-assembly processes influence macroscopic physicochemical properties of fluid and solid materials
2008	Ulrich Zuelicke	Massey University	Theory of new electronic devices at the nanometre scale
2009	Thomas Buckley	Manaaki Whenua – Landcare Research	Entomological systematics, biogeography, speciation, and molecular evolution
2010	Shaun Hendy	Victoria University of Wellington / Industrial Research Limited	Theoretical nanotechnology
2011	Alexei Drummond	University of Auckland	Probabilistic models of molecular evolution and population genetics
2012	Eric Le Ru	Victoria University of Wellington	Surface-enhanced Raman spectroscopy and nanoplasmonics
2013	Noam Greenberg	Victoria University of Wellington	Theory of computability
2014	Merryn Gott	University of Auckland	How to reduce suffering at the end of life
2014	Richard Tilley	Victoria University of Wellington	Synthesis and electron microscopy characterisation of nanoparticles
2015	Stéphane Coen	University of Auckland	Nonlinear optical phenomena in optical fibres
2016	Guy Jameson	University of Otago	Chemistry of metalloproteins
2017	Christian Hartinger	University of Auckland	Development of metal-based anticancer drugs
2018	Siân Halcrow	University of Otago	Human remains in an archaeological context
2019	Nick Golledge	Victoria University of Wellington	Modelling ice sheet and individual glacier behaviour
2020	Frédérique Vanholsbeeck	University of Auckland	Leading a biophotonics lab and researching bacteria using quantitative fluorescence spectroscopy
2021	Priscilla Wehi	University of Auckland	Conservation, biodiversity, and ecological restoration research informed by cross-disciplinary western science and indigenous knowledge
2022	Daniel Stouffer	University of Canterbury	Community ecology, particularly the role of species interactions in driving emergent ecological and evolutionary phenomena
2023	Tahu Kukutai	University of Waikato	Sociology, demography, Māori statistics
2024	Miro Erkintalo	University of Auckland	laser light for a host of applications ranging from telecommunications to sensing
2025	Terry Isson	University of Waikato	Geochemistry, climate modelling, carbon sequestration
