= Thomson Medal (Royal Society of New Zealand) =

Awarded since 1984 by the Royal Society of New Zealand

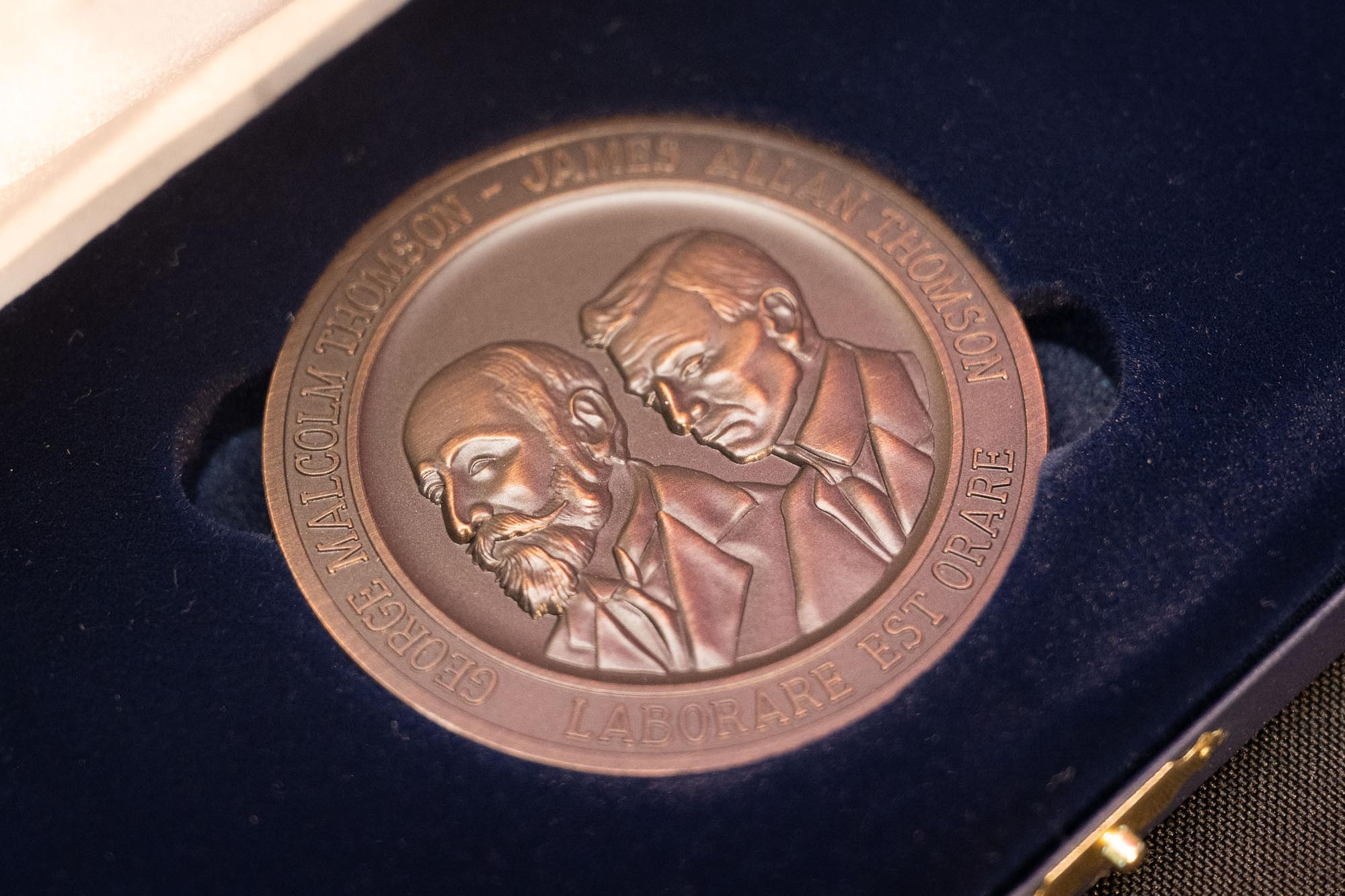
Thomson Medal in 2024

The Thomson Medal is a medal awarded annually since 1984 by the Royal Society of New Zealand for 'organisation, support and application of science and/or technology and/or the humanities in New Zealand.'

== Recipients ==
Year	Recipient
1985	Alan Mackney
1986	Colin Maiden
1987	Ian Baumgart
1988	Jim Hodge
1989	Angus Tait
1992	Mike Collins
1994	Don Llewellyn
1996	Richard Sadleir
1998	Jim Johnston
2000	Robert Anderson
2004	John Ayers
2006	John Hay
2007	John Alexander Kernohan
2008	Andy West
2009	Richard Garland
2010	Shaun Coffey
2011	Neville Jordan
2012	Richard Furneaux
2013	Peter Lee
2014	Rob Murdoch
2015	Richard Blaikie
2016	Bruce Campbell
2017	Charles Eason
2018	Carolyn Burns
2019	Timothy Haskell
2020	John Caradus
2021	Gary Wilson
2022	David Hutchinson
2023	Nicola Gaston
2024	Sergei Gulyaev
2025	Carolyn King
2026	Phillip Wilcox
