= Hugh Bibby =

New Zealand geophysicist

- Born: Hugh Mannering Bibby; 1943 (age 82–83); Wellington, New Zealand
- Education: University of Manchester
- Spouse: Hazel Downing (m. 1970; div. 1987)
- Children: 2
- Scientific career
- Fields: Geophysics
- Workplaces: GNS Science
- Thesis: Unsteady flow in a stratified rotating field (1970)
- Website: GNS Science profile

Hugh Mannering Bibby (born 1943) is a New Zealand geophysicist. He holds the position of emeritus geophysicist at the New Zealand research institute GNS Science.

== Life and career ==
Bibby was born in Wellington on 14 November 1943, the son of Ina Mary Bibby (née Coulter) and James Bruce Bibby, later appointed director of dental hygiene in the Department of Health. He studied at Victoria University of Wellington, graduating with a Bachelor of Science degree in 1966. The same year, he was awarded a Commonwealth Scholarship, and he undertook postgraduate study at Manchester University, where he graduated with a PhD in applied mathematics in 1970.

On 18 April 1970, Bibby married Hazel Downing in Stockton-on-Tees, County Durham, England. They returned to New Zealand and had two children, before divorcing in 1987. Hazel was a local politician in Wellington. She was a Wellington City Councillor from 1980 to 1986, Wellington Regional Councillor from 1983 to 1989 and member of the Wellington Harbour Board from 1983 to 1989.

Bibby worked at the Geophysics Division of the Department of Scientific and Industrial Research. Between 1973 and 2005 he wrote or co-wrote more than 40 research papers on geophysics. His work has included the discovery that the Mokai geothermal field is a major energy resource. There is now a geothermal power station at the site. He also devised a mathematical theory to account for how surveying marks throughout New Zealand are moving with respect to each other.

In 1999, Bibby was awarded the Hutton Medal "for fundamental contributions to earth sciences in earth deformation analysis and geo-electrical prospecting". In 2002 he was awarded the Shorland Medal in recognition of "his work in understanding geothermal fields". He has twice received the New Zealand Geophysics Prize: in 1978 for his mathematical geodetic theory, and in 1999, together with Grant Caldwell, for innovations in electrical prospecting theory. Bibby was elected a Fellow of the Royal Society of New Zealand in 1998.
