= MacDiarmid Institute for Advanced Materials and Nanotechnology =

Research centre at Victoria University of Wellington in New Zealand

Coordinates: 41.2911°S 174.7676°E

MacDiarmid Institute (English) Te Mana Tangata Whakawhanake (Māori)
- MacDiarmid Institute for Advanced Materials and Nanotechnology Research
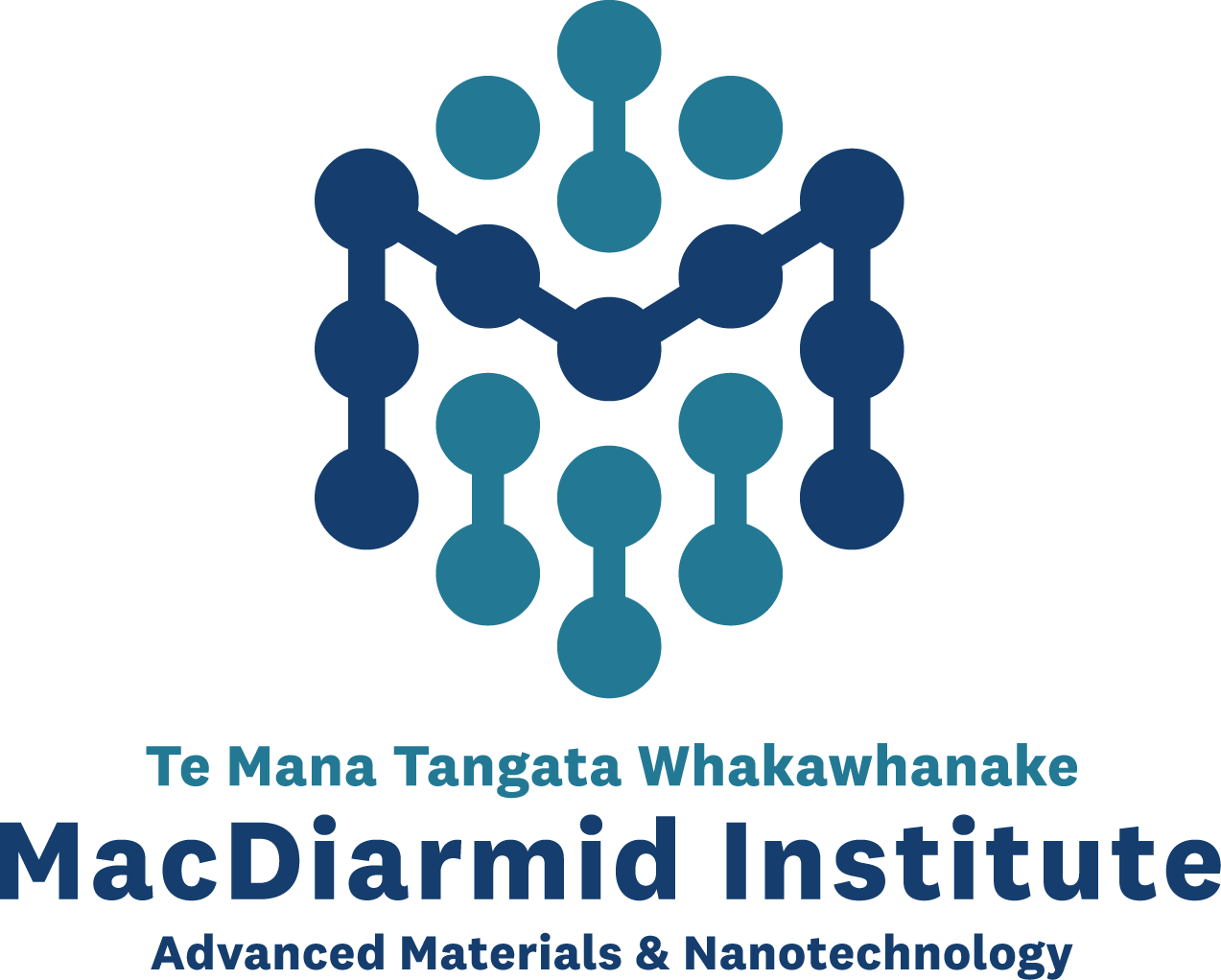
- Formation: 1 July 2002
- Type: research institute
- Headquarters: Wellington, New Zealand
- Director: Nicola Gaston
- Affiliations: Victoria University of Wellington
- Website: www.macdiarmid.ac.nz

The MacDiarmid Institute for Advanced Materials and Nanotechnology (often simply called the MacDiarmid Institute) is one of the first New Zealand Centres of Research Excellence (CoREs) and specialises in materials science and nanotechnology. It is hosted by Victoria University of Wellington, and is a collaboration between five universities and two Crown Research Institutes.

== Background ==
The Centres of Research Excellence initiative was set up in 2002 to allocate contestable New Zealand government funding through the Tertiary Education Commission to collaborative research groups. At the time the funding was announced, two materials science research groups were putting together competing bids.

One, based at the University of Canterbury, was the Nanostructure Engineering, Science and Technology (NEST) group. They had already received a Marsden grant in 1998 and run a 2001 workshop on semiconductor nanostructures in Queenstown attended by Nobel Laureate Klaus von Klitzing. Their bid, titled "the New Zealand Centre for Nanoengineered Materials and Device Research", was led by Richard Blaikie and included researchers Maan Alkaisi, Simon Brown, Steve Durbin and Roger Reeves.

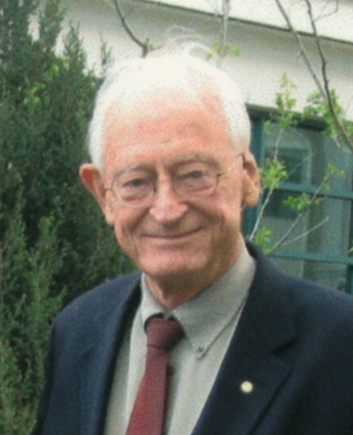
MacDiarmid in 2005

The second bid, put forward by Paul Callaghan and Jeff Tallon at Victoria University of Wellington, was titled "The MacDiarmid Institute for Advanced Materials". At a meeting at the Curator's House restaurant in Christchurch in 2001 the two groups agreed to join forces and put forward a joint proposal, drawn out on a table napkin, for the "MacDiarmid Institute for Advanced Materials and Nanotechnology Research", named at the insistence of Callaghan after Alan MacDiarmid, a New Zealander who had won the Nobel Prize in Chemistry in 2000. Callaghan representing Victoria University was to lead the CoRE, and Richard Blaikie from UC was to be deputy director.

The bid was successful, and the MacDiarmid Institute was formed on 1 July 2002, as a collaboration between Victoria University, the University of Canterbury, the University of Otago, Massey University, GNS Science, and Industrial Research Ltd; later Callaghan Innovation and the University of Auckland were included. It is housed in the School of Chemical and Physical Sciences of Victoria University.

Although living in Philadelphia, MacDiarmid was a strong supporter of the institute named after him: he adopted a mentoring role and regularly visited the Institute with his wife Gayl Gentile. The day he died, on 7 February 2007, he was due to fly to New Zealand to attend the MacDiarmid Institute's third Advanced Materials and Nanotechnology conference.

== Governance and funding ==
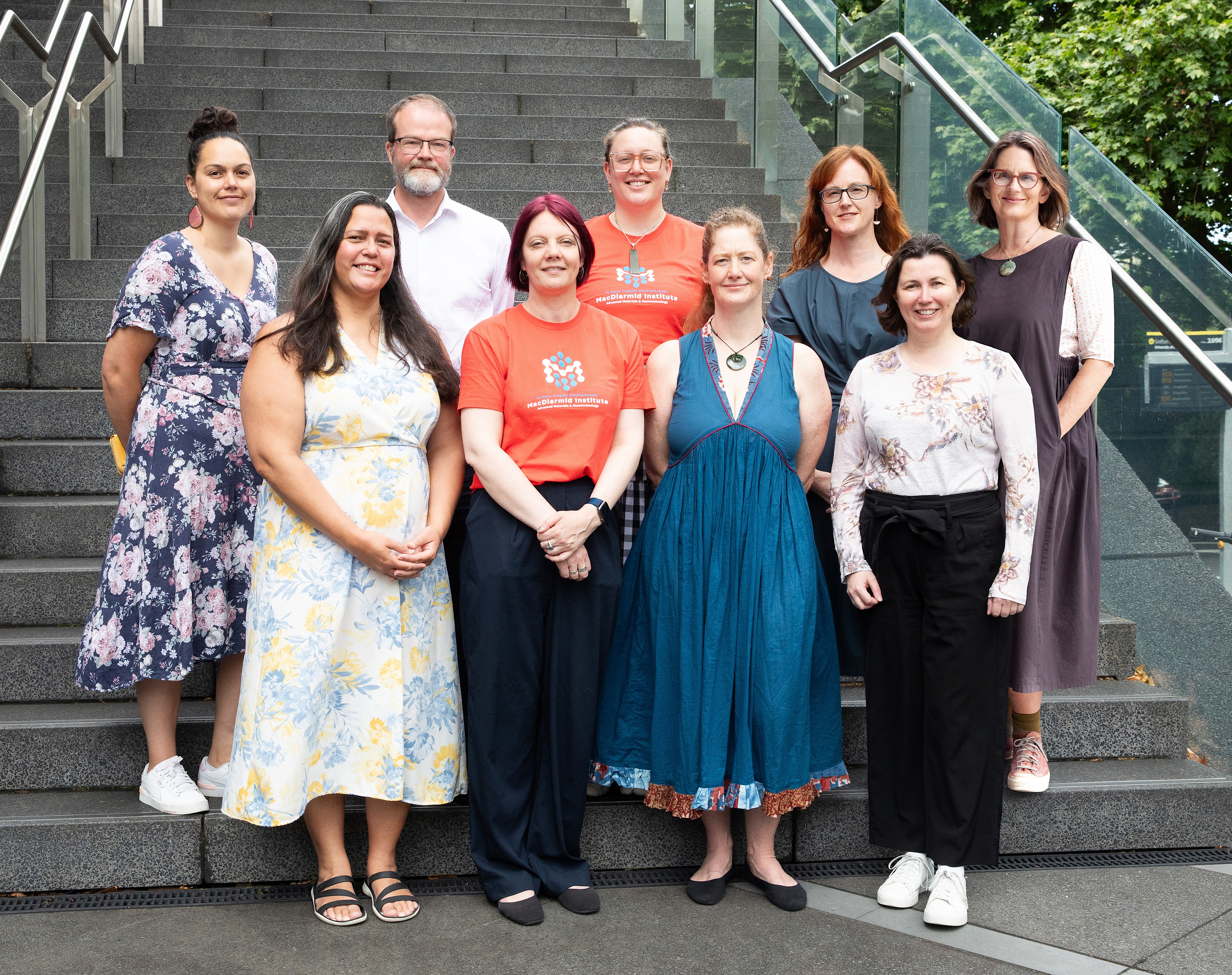
Staff of the MacDiarmid Institute at the 2025 Annual Symposium. Back row: Kirsty Doyle, Kevin Sheehy, Gabrielle Holmes, Anna Garden, Vanessa Young. Front row: Pauline Harris, Rosie Wayte, Nicola Gaston, and Natalie Plank.

The first five Centres of Research Excellence shared an initial $60m fund between them: a one-off capital expenditure of $20m, and $40.6m over four years. In 2009 the MacDiarmid Institute received an anonymous bequest of $1 million to support postgraduate research into nanotechnology.

=== Directors ===
	Name	Term	Notes
1	Paul Callaghan	2002–2008	
2	Richard Blaikie	2008–2011	
3	Kathryn McGrath	2011–2015	
4	Thomas Nann	2015–2018	
5	Nicola Gaston / Justin Hodgkiss	2018–2025	
6	Nicola Gaston	2025–	

== Research ==
In its early years, the MacDiarmid Institute divided its research into five themed areas, each with a "theme leader":

1. Nanoengineered material and devices (leader: Roger Reeves): nanofabrication of integrated circuits and small devices, with applications in biomolecule detection, magnetic sensors for computer hard drives, and electron field emissions for flat-panel displays.
2. Electronic, optic-electronic, and superconducting materials (leader: Andy Edgar): crystal structure of metal nitrides, high-temperature superconductors, composite glasses with nano-crystalline inclusions, and high temperature spectroscopy.
3. Conducting polymers (leader: Keith Gordon): nanostructured electromaterials using conductive polymers, carbon nanotubes, nanofibres, and quantum dots.
4. Soft materials (leader: Kate McGrath): complex fluid systems, emulsions, biomaterials and single biomolecule physics, semi-flexible polymers, plasmonics and surface-enhanced Raman spectroscopy.
5. Advanced inorganic and hybrid nanostructured materials (leader: Ken MacKenzie): developing inorganic polymers and hybrid or composite materials with potential applications in sensors, energy conversion, and biotechnology.

The Institute currently divides its work into four research areas:

- Towards Zero Waste – Reconfigurable Systems
- Towards Zero Carbon – Catalytic Architectures
- Towards Low Energy Tech – Hardware for Future Computing
- Sustainable resource use – Mātauranga Māori Research Programme

== Spinoff companies ==
MacDiarmid Institute research had led to the formation of over 30 affiliated spinoff companies. The earliest were:

- Aeroqual (2001), founded by David Williams: inexpensive air-pollution sensors
- Anzode (2003, now Zēlos Energy), founded by Simon Hall with his then-PhD student Michael Liu: zinc-based rechargeable batteries
- Nano Cluster Devices (2003), founded by Simon Brown: self-assembly of nanowires
- Magritek (2004), founded by Paul Callaghan: nuclear magnetic resonance technology

== Awards ==
From 2004 to 2008, the MacDiarmid Institute was a sponsor of the annual MacDiarmid Young Scientist of the Year awards for up-and-coming scientists and researchers in New Zealand receiving a scholarship from the Foundation for Research, Science and Technology. The winner travelled to Washington, D.C. to meet the winners of the equivalent prize awarded by the American Association for the Advancement of Science. These awards replaced the FiRST Scholarship Awards, and were in 2009 replaced by the Prime Minister's MacDiarmid Emerging Scientist Prize, won that year by John Watt at Victoria University of Wellington.

Young Scientist of the Year
Year	Winner	Institution	Research area
2004	Andrew Rudge	University of Canterbury	bioengineering sedative drug delivery
2005	Jessica North	University of Otago	environmental contamination from leaky landfills
2006	Claire French	University of Auckland	cell identification technology
2007	Jessie Jacobsen	University of Auckland	Huntington's disease
2008	Rebecca McLeod	University of Otago	marine ecology

== Advanced Materials and Nanotechnology conference ==
The MacDiarmid Institute runs a biennial international conference on advanced materials and nanotechnology (AMN). Its precursor, referred to by Richard Blaikie as "AMN0", was the 2001 semiconductor nanostructures conference in Queenstown organised by Simon Brown and Joe Trodahl. The AMN conference series was conceived of by Alan Kaiser, a founding member of the Institute, who chaired AMN1 in 2003 in Wellington. AMN11 was held in February 2025 for the first time in Christchurch, at Te Pae conference centre. It featured research on mechanobiology, quantum computing, and carbon-free iron production; Nobel Laureate Moungi Bawendi gave a public talk attended by over 650 people.

== See also ==
- Investigators at the MacDiarmid Institute
