= Carol King =

Carol King may refer to:

- Carole King (born 1942), American singer, songwriter and pianist
- Carol Weiss King (1895–1952), progressive American human rights lawyer
- Carol King (1942–1958), one of the murder victims of Charles Starkweather
- Carol King (actress) (born 1963), Nigerian actress and presenter
- Carol Vorderman (born 1960), British presenter and media personality

== See also ==
- Carolyn King (disambiguation)
- King Carol (disambiguation)
