= Biomedical Chromatography =

- Discipline: Biochemistry
- Language: English
- Edited by: M. G. Bartlett

Publication details
- History: 1986–present
- Publisher: John Wiley & Sons
- Frequency: Monthly
- Impact factor: 1.902 (2020)

Standard abbreviations
- ISO 4: Biomed. Chromatogr.

Indexing
- CODEN: BICHE2
- ISSN: 0269-3879 (print); 1099-0801 (web)
- OCLC no.: 477216885

Links
- Journal homepage; Online access; Online archive

Biomedical Chromatography is a monthly peer-reviewed scientific journal, published since 1986 by John Wiley & Sons. It covers research on the applications of chromatography and allied techniques in the biological and medical sciences. The editor-in-chief is Michael Bartlett (University of Georgia).

== Abstracting and indexing ==
The journal is abstracted and indexed in:

- Chemical Abstracts Service
- Scopus
- Science Citation Index

According to the Journal Citation Reports, the journal has a 2020 impact factor of 1.902.

== Notable papers ==
The highest cited papers published in this journal are:

1. 'High-throughput quantitative bioanalysis by LC/MS/MS', Volume 14, Issue 6, Oct 2000, Pages: 422 - 429, Jemal M. Cited 178 times
2. 'Analytical Chemistry and Biochemistry of D-Amino Acids', Volume 10, Issue 6, Nov-Dec 1996, Pages: 303–312, Imai K, Fukushima T, Santa T, et al. Cited 79 times
3. 'Fluorogenic and fluorescent labeling reagents with a benzofurazan skeleton', Volume 15, Issue 5, Aug 2001, Pages: 295–318, Uchiyama S, Santa T, Okiyama N, et al. Cited 74 times
