= Karla-Sue Marriott =

American scientist

Karla-Sue Marriott is a professor of forensic science in the School of Justice Studies at Roger Williams University and the director for the RWU Forensic Science program. She is known for her work in 3-D virtual reality for training students. She also contributed to research at NASA that helped launch the Space-X 3 Falcon 9 Rocket's Dragon Capsule.

== Research and career ==
Marriott obtained her B.S. in biochemistry from the University of West Indies, Jamaica. She worked as a forensic officer in the biology department of the government of Jamaica forensic science laboratory before receiving her Ph.D. in chemistry from the University of the West Indies, Jamaica in 2001. She then joined Clemson University as a postdoctoral research fellow where her research involved synthesis of selective ligands for the peripheral (CB2) cannabinoid receptor, and also on the synthesis of indole-based cannabinoids.

She founded the Bachelor of Forensic Science Program at Savannah State University, and led its coordination from 2011 to 2021. She was also the interim chair for the Chemistry and Forensic Science department. In 2016, Marriott established a novel 3-D Virtual Reality (VR) crime scene facility for training undergraduate students. Her research focuses on the development of therapeutic agents for immune and neurodegenerative disorders and related pathologies.

=== Awards and honors ===
- 2009 Certificate of Achievement in Honor of Outstanding Contribution to Education - The Big Read - National Endowment for the Arts
- 2013 Emerging Scholar as selected by Diverse Issues in Higher Education
- 2015 Governor's Teaching Fellowship, USG, Georgia, UGA/Athens
- 2017 Inaugural SSU President's Faculty Award for Innovation and Excellence
- 2017 Special Recognition "Recognizing Karla-Sue Marriott"
- 2019 USG Board of Regents Spotlight Presentation "Forensic Facial Reconstruction"
- 2019 President's Leadership & Service Award, SSU
- 2019 Community Change Agent, Operation One STEM at a Time, Savannah, GA
- 2019 Paul Harris Fellowship for Alzheimer's Research, Sunrise Rotary of Savannah, GA

== In the news ==
In 2018 Marriott spoke at TEDxSavannah and in 2020 she was highlighted in GPB News (Georgia Public Broadcasting) for her work on a faster DNA sequencing machine.

== Personal life ==
Marriott was born in Jamaica and grew up in Kingston, the only child of a single mother. Marriott is a self-taught naturalist painter who uses acrylic, oil, and mixed media on canvas and her work has been exhibited at the Raw Image Barbershop & Studio in Savannah.
