= Fu-Kuen Lin =

Fu-Kuen Lin (Chinese: 林福坤; born 1941 in Keelung, Taiwan) is a Taiwanese mycological physiologist, nephrologist and hematologist.

== Education and career ==
Lin received his B.S. from National Taiwan University in 1964 and then a M.S. in plant pathology in 1967. That year, he moved to the United States to study fungi physiology under Professor David Gottlieb at the University of Illinois at Urbana-Champaign. Lin was awarded a doctorate in plant pathology in 1971. He held postdoctoral and visiting scientist positions at several institutions between 1971 and 1981. He was an associate research fellow at the Institute of Botany of Academia Sinica in Taiwan from 1975 to 1977 and was an adjunct associate professor at National Taiwan University from 1976 to 1977.

Fu-Kuen Lin joined Amgen, a biotech company as a research scientist in August 1981. He was involved with Amgen's recombinant human erythropoietin (EPO) project from the start, and was soon leading the team, which was developing EPO based on a small sample of the hormone that had been isolated by a team led by Eugene Goldwasser at the University of Chicago. In 1983 his team successfully established the gene coding for it and recombinant human erythropoietin was approved by the US FDA in June 1989 with the generic name epoetin alpha, tradename Epogen.

Lin was also engaged in developing novel pharmaceutics and studying their molecular mechanisms. His primary research interests were in the fields of hematology, hypertension, immune regulation and fungi physiology. He retired from Amgen as the Director of the Department of Biomedical Sciences in 1998. Lin is the inventor of seven US patents covering “DNA Sequences Encoding Erythropoietin” and “Production of Erythropoietin”. Among other honors, he is a recipient of the “1989 Technology Corridor 100” Award; the 1990 “Quality of Life” Award; the “1995 Discoverers Award” (by Pharmaceutical Research and Manufacturers of America); and the Committee of 100, Pioneer Recognition Award in May 2002.

== Selected works ==
- Lin F. (1984), DNA sequences encoding erythropoietin., US-Patent 4,703,008 (30 November 1984).
- Lin F. et al. (1985) "Cloning and expression of the human erythropoietin gene" Proceedings of the National Academy of Sciences 82: 7580-7584.
