= Edmund H. Marriott =

Edmund H. Marriott, a captain in the Canadian Army, was awarded the Silver Star on 22 September 1943, by General Dwight D. Eisenhower for "gallantry in action on 23 and 24 April 1945 near Sandhatten, Germany. On 23 April, when "B" Company of The South Saskatchewan Regiment was suddenly taken under a hail of machine gun and sniper fire, Captain Marriott skillfully deployed two platoons, fearlessly led the third platoon in an assault which cleared the woods and allowed the other two platoons to resume the advance and gain their objective. The following day, when one section of his company was cut off by an infiltrating enemy group, Captain Marriott conducted himself with great daring in directing effective mortar fire upon the enemy and contributed immeasurably to the successful repulse of the enemy."
