= Gladys Marriott =

American politician

Member of the Missouri House of Representatives from the 16th, 37th, 51st district
- In office 1967–1986

Personal details
- Born: January 3, 1922 Spearman, Texas
- Died: June 30, 2005 (aged 83) Raytown, Missouri
- Party: Democratic
- Spouse(s): Lloyd H. Marriott, married September 28, 1941
- Children: 2 daughters
- Occupation: politician

Gladys Armstrong Marriott (January 3, 1922 - June 30, 2005) was an American politician who served as a Missouri state representative for 22 years. She was first elected in 1966. Marriott retired from politics in 1988. She was the vice president of the Jackson County Democratic Association and served six years as a committeewoman for Jackson County, Missouri.

Marriott was born in Spearman, Texas, to Lew and Bessie (Irons) Armstrong. Marriott graduated from Northeast High School in Kansas City. She married Lloyd H. Marriott on September 28, 1941, and was married to him until his death in 1997. Lloyd Marriott served in the Army Air Force during World War II. She was a homemaker, a Girl Scout leader, and a music director. Lloyd and Gladys Marriott had two daughters who graduated from University of Missouri-Kansas City.
