= Carolyn King (zoologist) =

New Zealand zoologist

Carolyn King FRSNZ
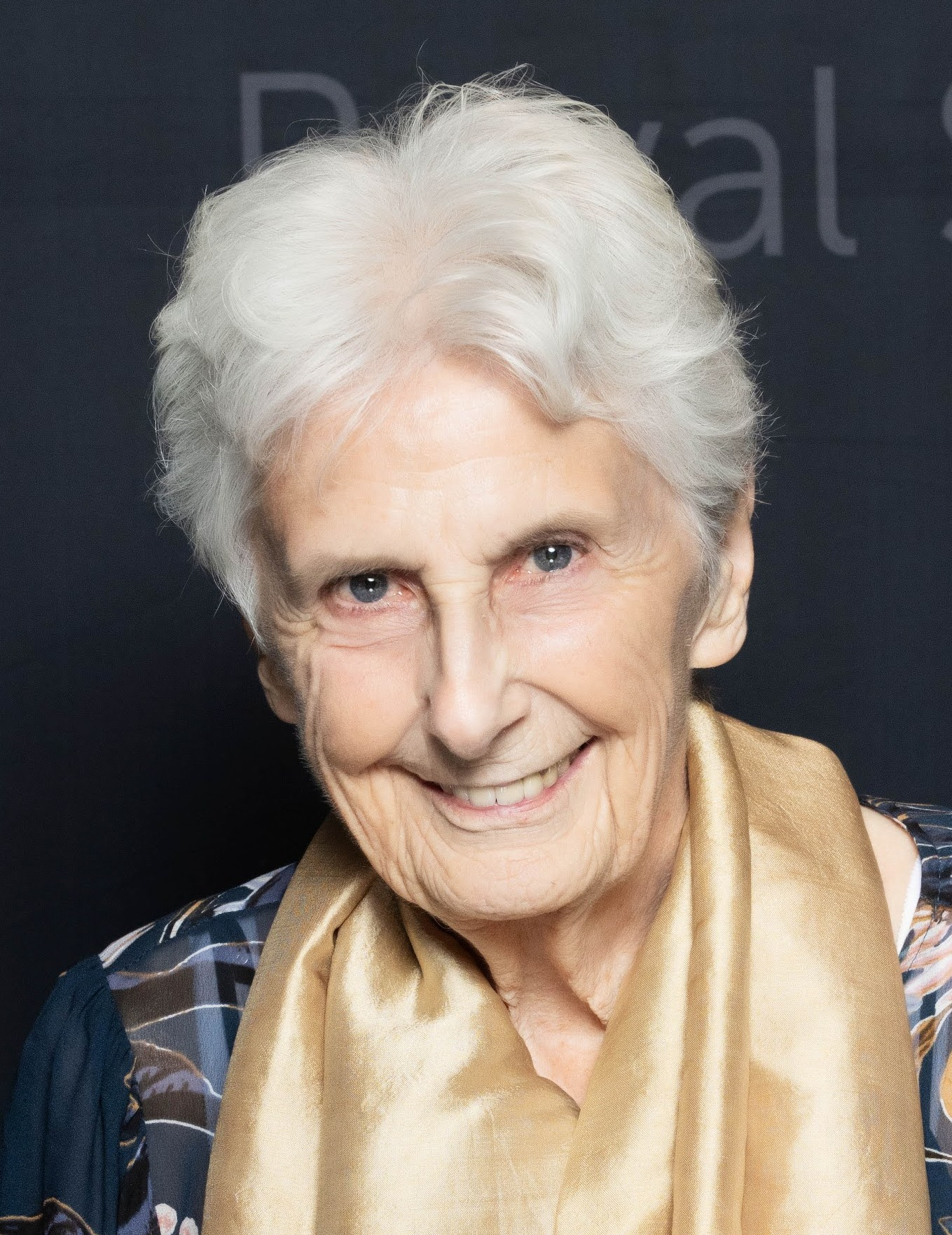
- King in 2025
- Other name: Carolyn Mary King
- Education: University of Oxford
- Scientific career
- Thesis: Studies on the ecology of the weasel (Mustela nivalis L.) (1971)
- Doctoral advisor: Henry Neville Southern

Carolyn Mary King FRSNZ is a New Zealand zoologist specialising in mammals, particularly small rodents and mustelids. She is currently a professor of biological sciences at the University of Waikato.

== Career ==
King got her first PhD in Zoology from the University of Oxford entitled 'Studies on the ecology of the weasel (Mustela nivalis L.)' studying under ornithologist Henry Neville Southern, before moving to DSIR's Ecology Division and from there to the University of Waikato, where she rose to full professor.

She won the New Zealand Ecology Society Te Tohu Taiao Award for Ecological Excellence in 1999. In 2018, King was elected a Fellow of the Royal Society of New Zealand.

She received her second PhD (this time in theology) from the University of Waikato entitled: 'Habitat of Grace - Biology, Christianity and the Global Environmental Crisis'.

In 2025, King was awarded the Thomson Medal of the Royal Society Te Apārangi.

== Selected works ==
- Carolyn M. King (2005). The Handbook of New Zealand Mammals. Oxford University Press. ISBN 978-0-19-558477-6.
- Carolyn M. King; Roger A. Powell (2007). The Natural History of Weasels and Stoats: Ecology, Behavior, and Management. Oxford University Press, USA. ISBN 978-0-19-530056-7.
- Carolyn M. King (1984). Immigrant Killers: Introduced Predators and the Conservation of Birds in New Zealand. Oxford University Press. ISBN 978-0-19-558121-8.
- King, CM (1983). "The relationships between beech (Nothofagus sp.) seedfall and populations of mice (Mus musculus), and the demographic and dietary responses of stoats (Mustela erminea), in three New Zealand forests". The Journal of Animal Ecology. 52 (1): 141–166. doi:10.2307/4593. JSTOR 4593.
