= Thomas Percy Hilditch =

English chemist

Thomas Percy Hilditch (22 April 1886 – 9 August 1965) was an English chemist who researched organic synthesis, lipid chemistry, and catalytic production techniques. He served as a professor of industrial chemistry at the University of Liverpool.

Hilditch was born in North Islington to Thomas and Priscilla née Hall. He was educated at Owen's School where he was influenced in science by his teachers F.R. Guglielmo and A.E. Dunstan. He joined University College, London to study chemistry under William Ramsay and J. Norman Collie graduating in 1907. He then worked at the University of Jena in 1908–1909 with Ludwig Knorr and University of Geneva 1910–1911 with P.A. Guye before returning to London to complete studies. He received a D.Sc. in 1911. Hilditch was involved in industrial research with Joseph Crosfield and Sons to produce acetone during World War I. In 1925 he joined the University of Liverpool as a professor of Industrial Chemistry. He was elected Fellow of the Royal Society in 1942 and made OBE 1952. He received the Lampitt Medal of The Society of Chemical Industry for 1962.

Some of his major books were:

- A Concise History of Chemistry (1911, 1922)
- A First Year Physical Chemistry (1912)
- A Third Year Course in Organic Chemistry (1914)
- The Industrial Chemistry of the Fats and Waxes (1927)
- The Chemical Composition of Natural Fats (1940)
