= Lisa Marriott =

New Zealand accounting academic

- Education: Victoria University of Wellington
- Scientific career
- Fields: Taxation
- Workplaces: Victoria University of Wellington
- Thesis: The Politics of Retirement Savings Taxation: a Trans-Tasman Comparison (2008)

Lisa Marriott is a New Zealand accounting academic. She is currently a full professor at Victoria University of Wellington.

== Academic career ==
After working in the private sector in the UK and the public sector in New Zealand, Marriott did a 2008 PhD titled 'The Politics of Retirement Savings Taxation: a Trans-Tasman Comparison' at Victoria University of Wellington before joining the staff and rising to full professor.

In 2012, Marriott received a $300,000 Marsden Grant to examine the investigation, prosecution and punishment of white collar and blue collar crime, particularly comparing tax evasion to benefit fraud. Findings included that tax fraudsters are treated much more leniently than benefit fraudsters.

== Selected works ==
- Marriott, Lisa. "Tax crime and punishment in New Zealand’." British Tax Review 5 (2012): 623.
- Marriott, Lisa. "Justice and the justice system: A comparison of tax evasion and welfare fraud in Australia and New Zealand." Griffith Law Review 22, no. 2 (2013): 403–429.
- Hodgson, Helen, and Lisa Marriott. "Retirement savings and gender: An Australasian comparison." Australian Tax Forum 28 (2013): 725.
- Marriott, Lisa, and Kevin Holmes. "Exploring the application of institutional theory to tax policy for retirement savings in New Zealand and Australia." Law Context: A Socio-Legal J. 24 (2006): 78.
- Marriott, Lisa, J. Randal, and Kevin Holmes. "Influences on Tax Evasion Behaviour: Insights from a behavioural simulation experiment." New Zealand Journal of Taxation Law and Policy 16, no. 4 (2010): 369–394.
