= New Zealand Association of Scientists =

Independent scientific association

- Abbreviation: NZAS
- Formation: 1941
- Legal status: non-profit incorporated society, charitable organisation
- Purpose: stands for and advocates for science and scientists in New Zealand
- Location: New Zealand
- Website: scientists.org.nz
- Formerly called: New Zealand Association of Scientific Workers

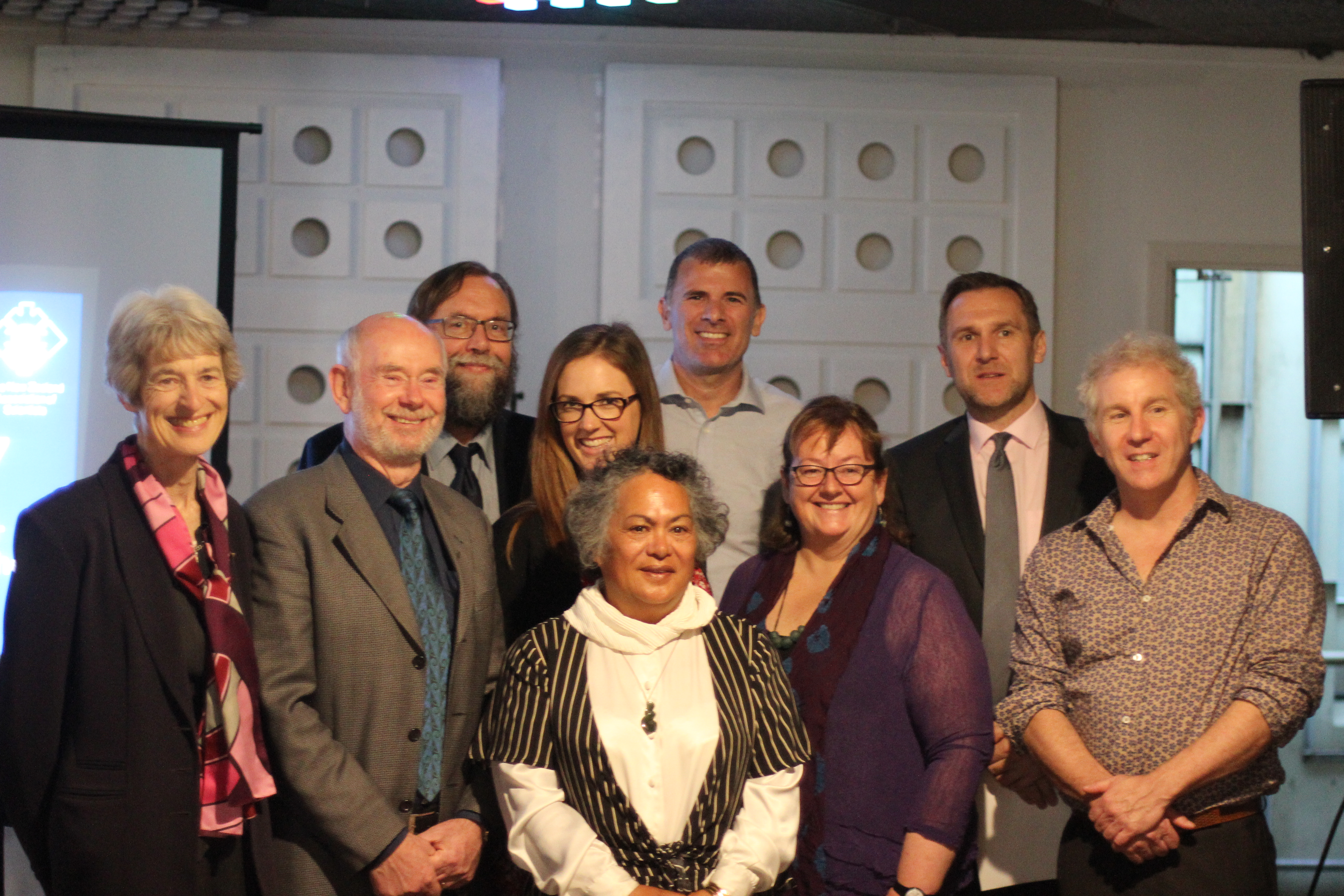
New Zealand Association of Scientists award night 1 November 2017

The New Zealand Association of Scientists is an independent association for scientists in New Zealand. It was founded in 1941 as the New Zealand Association of Scientific Workers, and renamed in 1954. It differs from the Royal Society of New Zealand in being an independent non-profit incorporated society and registered charity, rather than being constituted by an Act of Parliament. While not being entirely non-political, the Association focuses on policy, social and economic responsibility aspects of science.

== History ==
The history of the Association is documented in a sequence of articles in the NZ Science Review (NZSR) written by Geoff Gregory. In addition, Gregory wrote a condensed version of these articles for the Journal of the Royal Society of New Zealand. Gregory, educated at Oxford, spent his career in information sciences in the N.Z. science sector both with the DSIR and the New Zealand Geological Survey. He edited the NZSR from 1974 to 1984. The first installment of the NZAS history runs from 1941 until 1954. Initially formed as the New Zealand Association of Scientific Workers, an inaugural meeting with a "large attendance" was held at the Central Library Hall in Wellington in December 1941. The meeting defined the objective of the new organisation being "to secure the wider application of science and the scientific method for the welfare of society and to promote the interests of scientific workers".

The Association's first President was W.B. (Bill) Sutch, an economist, historian, writer, public servant, and public intellectual. Gregory's article suggests the initial impetus for the Association lay mainly with Sutch. Despite this, Sutch's involvement with the Association was brief as he was called up for military service. Sutch would later be charged and acquitted of trying to pass New Zealand Government information to the Soviet Union. Initial membership numbers were over 100. Much of the early phase of the Association was taken up in response to the Second World War. With editorials and Presidential addresses emphasising "exploring new horizons opened up through intensive war-time research" and that the "future of science and of scientists must be fought for, not in the laboratory, but in the broader sphere of society".

Right from the outset the Association was focused on improving the salaries of scientific workers as well as seeking gender equality who were even more poorly paid than the average worker. Despite these initiatives, the Association determined that it was not a trade union. This appears to be for a number of reasons, one of which was the perception around Unions. So much so, that in 1954 the Association changed its name to the New Zealand Association of Scientists and registered as an incorporated society in New Zealand In that same year, Earnest Marsden became Patron of the Association.

The place of science technicians formed a significant thread for the Association over the decades with surveys as well as the suggestion of forming a separate technicians association. Another initiative was the development of a directory of scientists for a time when such information was difficult to easily access in one place. The Association also identified a dearth of science policy and encouraged governments to consider the economic benefits of scientific research. The Association was also an early supporter of school science fairs, encouraging the initiative to be run nationally.

The 1970s saw the Association begin to develop clearer messages around social responsibility including topics such as nuclear research, genetics, and environmental preservation. On top of these issues the organization also responded to attempts to muzzle scientists. Gender equality was a central theme from the mid 1970s-on with the Association electing its first woman President, Dr Ann Bell, in 1982. Bell was followed by Drs Gail Irwin, Karin Knedler and Joan Mattingley. In addition, there was a substantial improvement in gender-balance for the Association's council although this did not last. This remains an issue for the Association and science in New Zealand. Past-president Professor Nicola Gaston published the high profile book on the topic explaining how science is sexist.

The Association produced strong responses to the science reforms in New Zealand in the early 1990s which saw the formation of the Crown Research Institutes. It formed the subject of the 1993 conference. This was repeated around three decades later with the Association's response to the MBIE-led Te Ara Paerangi Future Pathways review of the New Zealand Science Sector.

== New Zealand Science Review ==
The Association publishes a peer reviewed journal the New Zealand Science Review (NZSR), which is "a forum for the exchange of views on science and science policy issues".

Right at the initial formation of the New Zealand Association of Scientific Workers it was determined that a journal was required. An initial issue of the Quarterly Review of the New Zealand Association of Scientific Workers was published in 1942. However, this was followed six months later by the first issue of the New Zealand Science Review in December 1942. It was crown quarto size (slightly smaller than B5) and 12 pages long. The journal included editorials, Association matter and also dedicated significant space to the inclusion of abstracts from recent publications.

Throughout the journal's history it has had problems with publication costs and the nature of voluntary work from the editorial side. In addition other difficulties included challenges such as a "shortages of paper" in the immediate post-war period.

The journal has changed its look a number of times through its history. As well as the switch from the Quarterly Review in 1942, the journal was renewed in 1970 with a different physical layout and also different article categories. The journal was again revamped in the early 2000s by Dr Ira Beu which gave the journal its look and structure that lasted for two decades. Allen Petrey edited the journal from 2001 through to early 2022.

In 2019 and 2020 two special issues of the journal were published on the topic of Mātauranga Māori. This set of four issues was headed with a foreword by Drs Ocean Mercier and Anne-Marie Jackson.

In 2022 the decision was made to move to an e-Journal format as well as an editorial board. The revised scope for the Journal states that it "provides a forum for the discussion of issues of relevance to science in Aotearoa New Zealand in the past, present and future". Among the suitable topics identified include science strategy/policy, Aotearoa New Zealand relevance of major advances, Māori science/research, science planning, freedom of information, record of govt science-relevant strategies, history of science, engagement between science and society etc. The initial editorial board comprised Craig Stevens, Troy Baisden, Lucy Stewart, Simon Hills, Ben Dickson, Tara McAllister, and Alexis Marshall.

== Awards ==
The Association awards four medals annually to celebrate aspects of science that has had significant value for New Zealand:

- Marsden Medal for a lifetime of outstanding service to the cause or profession of science.
- Hill Tinsley Medal (renamed in 2016, previously the Research medal) for outstanding fundamental or applied research in the physical, natural or social sciences published by a scientist or scientists within 15 years of their PhD.
- Shorland Medal for recognition of major and continued contribution to basic or applied research that has added significantly to scientific understanding or resulted in significant benefits to society.
- Cranwell Medal (formerly known as the Science Communicator Medal) made to a practising scientist for excellence in communicating science to the general public in any area of science or technology.

== Conferences ==
The Association organised a number of landmark conferences, typically around a topical theme.

- 1969 – The findings of the National Development Conference (NDC).
- 1991 – The Public Good Science Fund.
- 2016 – 75th Anniversary Conference.
- 2017 – Beyond the usual suspects – science outside the institutes.
- 2018 – New Zealand perspectives at the interface of science and policy
- 2021 – Reshaping New Zealand's research system: finding solutions.

== Notable past presidents ==
The normal term for a President under the Association's rules is two years. In 2017, a co-presidency option was instituted. In 2025 the co-presidency is held by Lucy Stewart and Troy Baisden.

- Bill Sutch, New Zealand Association of Scientific Workers
- H.B. (Barry) Fell, Zoologist
- Brian Shorland, organic chemist
- Joan Mattingley (Cameron), clinical chemist
- David Penny, biologist
- Kathryn McGrath, chemist
- Janet Grieve, biological oceanographer
- James Renwick, climate scientist
- Shaun Hendy, physicist
- Nicola Gaston, chemist
