= 1935 in New Zealand =

- Decades: 1910s; 1920s; 1930s; 1940s; 1950s
- See also: History of New Zealand; List of years in New Zealand; Timeline of New Zealand history

The following lists events that happened during 1935 in New Zealand.

== Population ==
- Estimated population as of 31 December: 1,569,700.
- Increase since previous 31 December 1934: 11,300 (0.73%).
- Males per 100 females: 103.1.

== Incumbents ==
=== Regal and viceregal ===
- Head of State – George V
- Governor-General – The Lord Bledisloe GCMG KBE PC, succeeded same year by The Viscount Galway GCMG DSO OBE PC

=== Government ===
The 24th New Zealand Parliament continued with the coalition of the United Party and the Reform Party. In November the 1935 New Zealand general election resulted in a massive win for the opposition Labour Party.

- Speaker of the House – Charles Statham
- Prime Minister – George Forbes then Michael Joseph Savage
- Minister of Finance – Gordon Coates then Walter Nash
- Minister of Foreign Affairs – George Forbes then Michael Joseph Savage
- Attorney-General – George Forbes then Rex Mason
- Chief Justice – Sir Michael Myers

=== Parliamentary opposition ===
- Leader of the Opposition – Michael Joseph Savage (Labour) until 6 December, then George Forbes (United/Reform).

=== Main centre leaders ===
- Mayor of Auckland – George Hutchison then Ernest Davis
- Mayor of Wellington – Thomas Hislop
- Mayor of Christchurch – Dan Sullivan
- Mayor of Dunedin – Edwin Thomas Cox

== Events ==
- 13 February: Fourth session of the 24th Parliament commences.
- 5 April: Parliament goes into recess.
- 29 June: The Christchurch Times ceases publication. The newspaper began as the Lyttelton Times in 1851.
- 29 August: Parliament recommences.
- 26 October: Fourth session of the 24th Parliament concludes.
- 1 November: The 24th Parliament is dissolved.
- 26 November: Voting in the four Māori electorates for the 1935 General Election.
- 27 November: Voting in the 76 general electorates for the 1935 General Election.

== Arts and literature ==
See 1935 in art, 1935 in literature, Category:1935 books

=== Music ===
See: 1935 in music

=== Radio ===
See: Public broadcasting in New Zealand

=== Film ===
- Down on the Farm
- Hei Tiki / Primitive Passions
- New Zealand's Charm: A Romantic Outpost of Empire
- Magic Playgrounds in New Zealand's Geyserland

See: Category:1935 film awards, 1935 in film, List of New Zealand feature films, Cinema of New Zealand, Category:1935 films

== Sport ==
=== Chess ===
- The 44th National Chess Championship was held in Christchurch, and was won by J.A. Erskine of Invercargill.

=== Golf ===
- The 25th New Zealand Open championship was won by Alex Murray.
- The 39th National Amateur Championships were held in Christchurch
  - Men: J.P. Hornabrook (Masterton)
  - Women: Miss J. Anderson

=== Horse racing ===
==== Harness racing ====
- New Zealand Trotting Cup – Indianapolis (2nd win)
- Auckland Trotting Cup – Graham Direct

=== Lawn bowls ===
The national outdoor lawn bowls championships are held in Auckland.

- Men's singles champion – Arthur Engebretsen (Napier Bowling Club)
- Men's pair champions – H.G. Loveridge, R.N. Pilkington (skip) (Hamilton Bowling Club)
- Men's fours champions – William Edward Mincham, L.G. Donaldson, William James Liversidge, H. Whittle (skip) (Grey Lynn Bowling Club)

=== Rugby union ===
Category:Rugby union in New Zealand, Category:All Blacks

- Ranfurly Shield

=== Rugby league ===
New Zealand national rugby league team

=== Soccer ===
- The Chatham Cup is won by Hospital of Wellington who beat Western of Christchurch 3–1 in the final.
- Provincial league champions:
  - Auckland: Ponsonby AFC (Auckland)
  - Canterbury: Western
  - Hawke's Bay: Napier YMCA
  - Nelson: YMCA
  - Otago: Maori Hill
  - Southland: Corinthians
  - Waikato: Huntly Starr Utd
  - Wanganui: Thistle
  - Wellington: Hospital

== Births ==
=== January ===
- 2 January – Bill Snowden, rugby league player (died 2016)
- 3 January – Rata Harrison, rugby league player (died 2013)
- 9 January
  - John Graham, rugby union player and administrator, educator (died 2017)
  - Stewart McKnight, cricketer (died 2021)
- 16 January – Muru Walters, rugby union player, Anglican bishop (died 2024)
- 21 January – Mick Cossey, rugby union player (died 1986)
- 23 January – Bill Culbert, artist (died 2019)
- 24 January – Peter Wolfenden, harness-racing driver (died 2023)

=== February ===
- 5 February – Gordon Parkinson, public servant, diplomat
- 6 February – Reg Boorman, politician (died 2016)
- 10 February
  - Mark Irwin, rugby union player (died 2018)
  - Ian Kerr, field hockey player
- 16 February – Robin Clark, chemist (died 2018)
- 22 February – Barry Anderson, composer (died 1987)
- 23 February
  - John Osmers, Anglican bishop, anti-apartheid activist (died 2021)
  - Derek Round, journalist (died 2012)
- 25 February – Neville Scott, athlete (died 2005)
- 27 February
  - James Cooke, sailor
  - Edward Te Whiu, convicted murderer (died 1955)

=== March ===
- 3 March – Peter Elworthy, farming leader, businessman (died 2004)
- 5 March – Brian Wybourne, physicist (died 2003)
- 8 March – Mansfield Rangi, cricket umpire (died 1987)
- 12 March – Maurice Rae, athlete
- 19 March – Wes Sandle, physicist (died 2020)
- 25 March – Tim Eliott, actor (died 2017)
- 28 March – Graham Nuthall, educationist (died 2004)
- 29 March – John Armstrong, politician (died 2018)

=== April ===
- 3 April – Marrion Roe, swimmer (died 2017)
- 4 April – Geoff Braybrooke, politician (died 2013)
- 13 April – Kenneth Hayr, Royal Air Force commander (died 2001)
- 16 April – Lois Muir, netball player and coach
- 22 April – Dick Conway, rugby union player (died 2022)
- 30 April – Bruce Bodle, cricketer (died 2008)

=== May ===
- 11 May
  - Gwyn Evans, association footballer (died 2000)
  - Stuart O'Connell, Roman Catholic bishop (died 2019)
- 15 May
  - Barry Crump, author (died 1996)
  - Kevin Percy, field hockey player (died 2019)
  - Blair Robson, rally driver
- 19 May – Brian MacDonell, politician
- 27 May – Guy Jansen, choral musician and music educator (died 2019)
- 31 May
  - Jim Bolger, politician (died 2025)
  - Bruce Bolton, cricketer
  - William Holt, cricketer (died 2024)

=== June ===
- 1 June – Margot Forde, botanist (died 1992)
- 2 June – Ross Gillespie, field hockey player and coach (died 2023)
- 3 June – Raoul Franklin, physicist (died 2021)
- 11 June – Alan Ward, historian (died 2014)
- 14 June – Mervyn Thompson, playwright, theatre director (died 1992)
- 17 June – Ron Carter, businessman
- 22 June – Koro Wētere, politician (died 2018)
- 25 June – Margaret Sparrow, physician, reproductive rights advocate, author
- 29 June – Manu Maniapoto, rugby union player (died 2017)
- 30 June – John Turnbull, cricketer (died 2018)

=== July ===
- 10 July – Wilson Whineray, rugby union player, businessman (died 2012)
- 11 July – Bruce Bricknell, cricket umpire (died 1982)
- 14 July – Leon Phillips, physical chemist (died 2023)
- 22 July – Tuppy Diack, rugby union player (died 2025)
- 28 July – Tom Delahunty, association football referee (died 2018)
- 29 July – Iain Gillies, association footballer (died 2025)
- 31 July – Peter Siddell, artist (died 2011)

=== August ===
- 7 August – Campbell Thomas, theatre director (died 2019)
- 9 August – Des Connor, rugby union player
- 18 August – Howard Morrison, entertainer (died 2009)

=== September ===
- 1 September – Graeme Lee, politician
- 4 September – John Kneebone, farming leader (died 2020)
- 7 September – Douglas Sturkey, diplomat
- 11 September – Jim Williams, Pentecostal pastor (died 2015)
- 24 September – Vincent Orange, historian (died 2012)
- 26 September – Ralph Roberts, sailor, sports administrator (died 2023)

=== October ===
- 3 October – Judy Bailey, pianist, composer (died 2025)
- 4 October – Lyndsey Leask, softball administrator (died 2021)
- 5 October – Edmund Bohan, historian, singer, author (died 2024)
- 6 October – John Anslow, field hockey player (died 2017)
- 7 October – Barrie Devenport, marathon swimmer (died 2010)
- 9 October
  - Paul Barton, cricketer
  - Jeff Julian, athlete
- 10 October – Michael Henderson, fencer (died 2025)
- 16 October
  - David Hoskin, cricket player and administrator
  - Brian Maunsell, field hockey player (died 1987)
- 18 October – Margaret Beames, children's author (died 2016)
- 19 October – Jimmy O'Dea, trade unionist and activist (died 2021)
- 26 October – Barry Brickell, potter (died 2016)
- 28 October – Moana Manley, swimmer, beauty queen (died 2017)

=== November ===
- 10 November – Marilyn Duckworth, writer
- 15 November – Ken Douglas, trade unionist (died 2022)
- 22 November – Don Selwyn, actor, filmmaker (died 2007)
- 24 November – Bruce Palmer, jurist (died 2017)
- 28 November – Bob Binning, fencer (died 2005)

=== December ===
- 4 December – Gerald Hensley, public servant, diplomat (died 2024)
- 5 December
  - Marise Chamberlain, athlete (died 2024)
  - Max Gimblett, artist
- 7 December – Robin Dudding, journalist, literary editor (died 2008)
- 10 December – Max Cryer, entertainer, broadcaster, writer (died 2021)
- 13 December – Richard Sylvan, philosopher, logician, environmentalist (died 1996)
- 17 December – Ray Puckett, athlete, croquet player
- 20 December – Billy Ibadulla, cricket player, coach and commentator (died 2024)
- 21 December – Don Neely, cricket player, selector and writer (died 2022)
- 23 December – Warren Johnston, cyclist
- 29 December – Russell Watt, rugby union player (died 2022)
- 31 December – Billy Apple, pop artist (died 2021)

=== Undated ===
- Ken Blackburn, actor
- Arthur Everard, filmmaker, journalist, chief censor
- Joseph Musaphia, actor
- Howard Williams, potter

== Deaths ==
=== January–February ===
- 3 January – Francis Redwood, Roman Catholic archbishop (born 1839)
- 14 January – Mita Taupopoki, Tūhourangi and Ngāti Wāhiao leader (born c. 1845)
- 18 January
  - Robert Hughes (conservationist), lawyer, politician, conservationist (born 1847)
  - John Macmillan Brown, university academic and administrator (born 1845)
- 22 January – James Blacklock, cricketer (born 1883)
- 28 January – Matthew Barnett, bookmaker, philanthropist (born 1859)
- 1 February – William Sadlier, Anglican bishop (born 1867)
- 4 February – Robert Logan, soldier, colonial administrator (born 1863)

=== March–April ===
- 2 March – Pat McEvedy, rugby union player and administrator (born 1880)
- 4 March
  - Charles Barton, businessman, politician, civic administrator (born 1852)
  - William Kilgour, cricketer (born 1878)
- 5 March – Frances Fletcher, artist (born 1846)
- 10 March – Charles Thorn, trade unionist, politician (born 1847)
- 19 March – James Randall Corrigan, politician (born 1865)
- 26 March
  - Arthur Atkinson, lawyer, politician (born 1863)
  - John Mallard, cricketer (born 1860)
- 7 April – Adrian Langerwerf, Roman Catholic missionary, writer (born 1876)
- 13 April – James McDonald, painter filmmaker, museum director (born 1865)
- 16 April – Dolla Richmond, painter (born 1861)

=== May–June ===
- 1 May – George Carter, lawn bowls player, accountant (born 1883)
- 6 May – Kate Edger, school principal, first woman in New Zealand to earn a university degree (born 1857)
- 22 May – Edwin Davy, rugby union player (born 1850)
- 27 May
  - John Dart, Anglican priest (born 1855)
  - Phomen Singh, confectioner (born c. 1869)
- 29 May
  - Harry Bayly, cricketer (born 1862)
  - Samuel Goldstein, rabbi, scholar, community leader (born 1852)
- 2 June
  - George Pearce, politician (born 1863)
  - Sir Alfred Robin, military leader (born 1860)
- 7 June – Elizabeth McCombs, politician, first female MP in New Zealand (born 1873)
- 13 June – Jim Coucher, Australian rules footballer (born 1874)
- 20 June – William Ferguson, civil engineer (born 1852)
- 25 June – Alfred Cousins, engraver and postage stamp designer (born 1852)
- 26 June – Charles Corfe, cricketer, headmaster (born 1847)

=== July–August ===
- 12 July – Nurse Maude, district nursing pioneer (born 1862)
- 29 July – Dan Udy, rugby union player (born 1874)
- 12 August – Albert Geddes, cricketer (born 1871)
- 17 August – James Craigie, businessman, politician (born 1851)

=== September–October ===
- 2 October – Jeremiah Connolly, politician (born 1875)
- 3 October – Harry Knight, farmer, politician, racehorse owner (born 1860)
- 5 October – William Stevenson, politician (born 1864)
- 7 October
  - James Garrow, legal academic (born 1865)
  - Sidney Williamson, singer, conductor and singing teacher (born c. 1870)
- 11 October – Sir James Coates, banker (born 1851)
- 12 October – Victorine Goddard, hotelkeeper (born 1844)
- 18 October – Ernie Booth, rugby union player (born 1876)
- 23 October – Ernest Upham, cricketer, lawyer (born 1873)
- 24 October – James Gibb, Presbyterian minister, pacifist (born 1857)

=== November–December ===
- 6 November – Catherine Carran, midwife (born 1842)
- 20 November – John Jellicoe, 1st Earl Jellicoe, governor-general (1920–1924) (born 1859)
- 25 November – Kenneth Williams, politician (born 1870)
- 7 December – Philip de la Perrelle, newspaper proprietor, politician (born 1872)
- 14 December – Mother Josepha, Roman Catholic nun, teacher (born 1863)
- 15 December – George James Anderson, politician (born 1860)
- 23 December – Charles Speight, rugby union player, politician (born 1870)

=== Unknown date ===
- Makurata Paitini, Māori weaver

== See also ==
- History of New Zealand
- List of years in New Zealand
- Military history of New Zealand
- Timeline of New Zealand history
- Timeline of New Zealand's links with Antarctica
- Timeline of the New Zealand environment
