= 1932 in New Zealand =

- Decades: 1910s; 1920s; 1930s; 1940s; 1950s
- See also: History of New Zealand; List of years in New Zealand; Timeline of New Zealand history

The following lists events that happened during 1932 in New Zealand.

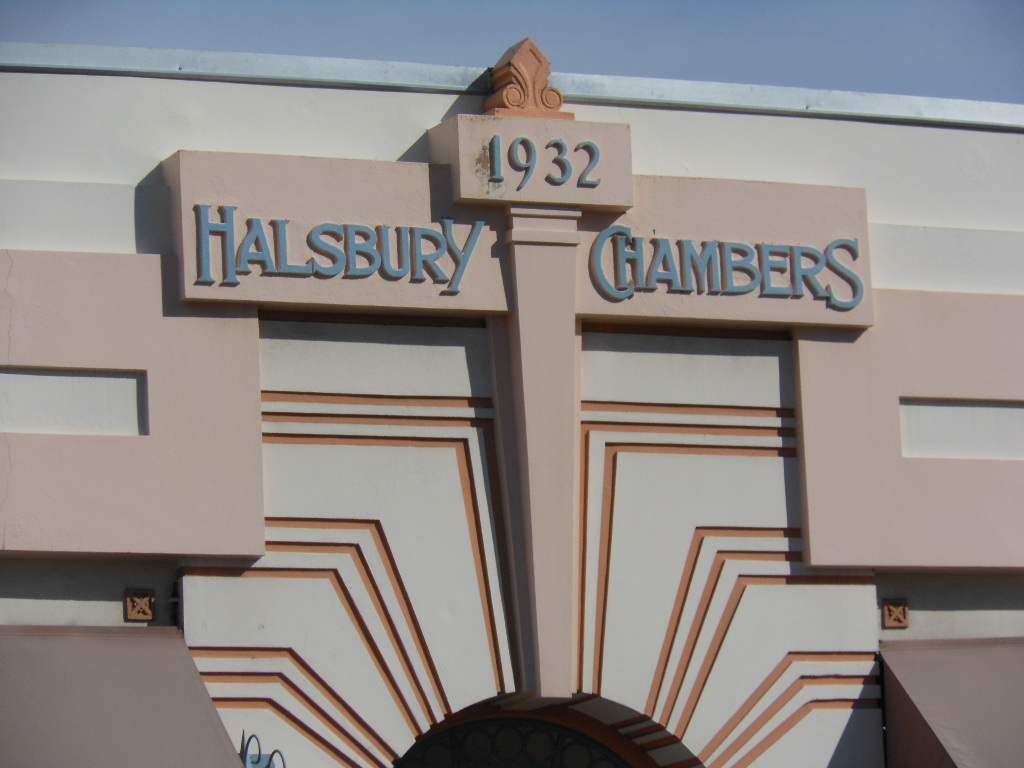
In 1932, the rebuild of Napier was underway after the devastating 1931 Hawke's Bay earthquake; its architecture is regarded today as being one of the finest collections of Art Deco in the world

== Population ==
- Estimated population as of 31 December: 1,534,700.
- Increase since previous 31 December 1931: 11,900 (0.78%).
- Males per 100 females: 103.6.

== Incumbents ==
=== Regal and viceregal ===
- Head of State – George V
- Governor-General – Charles Bathurst, Lord Bledisloe

=== Government ===
The 24th New Zealand Parliament commenced with the coalition of the United Party and the Reform Party.

- Speaker of the House – Charles Statham (Independent)
- Prime Minister – George Forbes
- Minister of Finance – William Downie Stewart (Reform Party)
- Minister of Foreign Affairs – George Forbes
- Attorney-General – William Downie Stewart

=== Parliamentary opposition ===
- Leader of the Opposition – Harry Holland (Labour).

=== Judiciary ===
- Chief Justice — Sir Michael Myers

=== Main centre leaders ===
- Mayor of Auckland – George Hutchison
- Mayor of Wellington – Thomas Hislop
- Mayor of Christchurch – Dan Sullivan
- Mayor of Dunedin – Robert Black

== Events ==
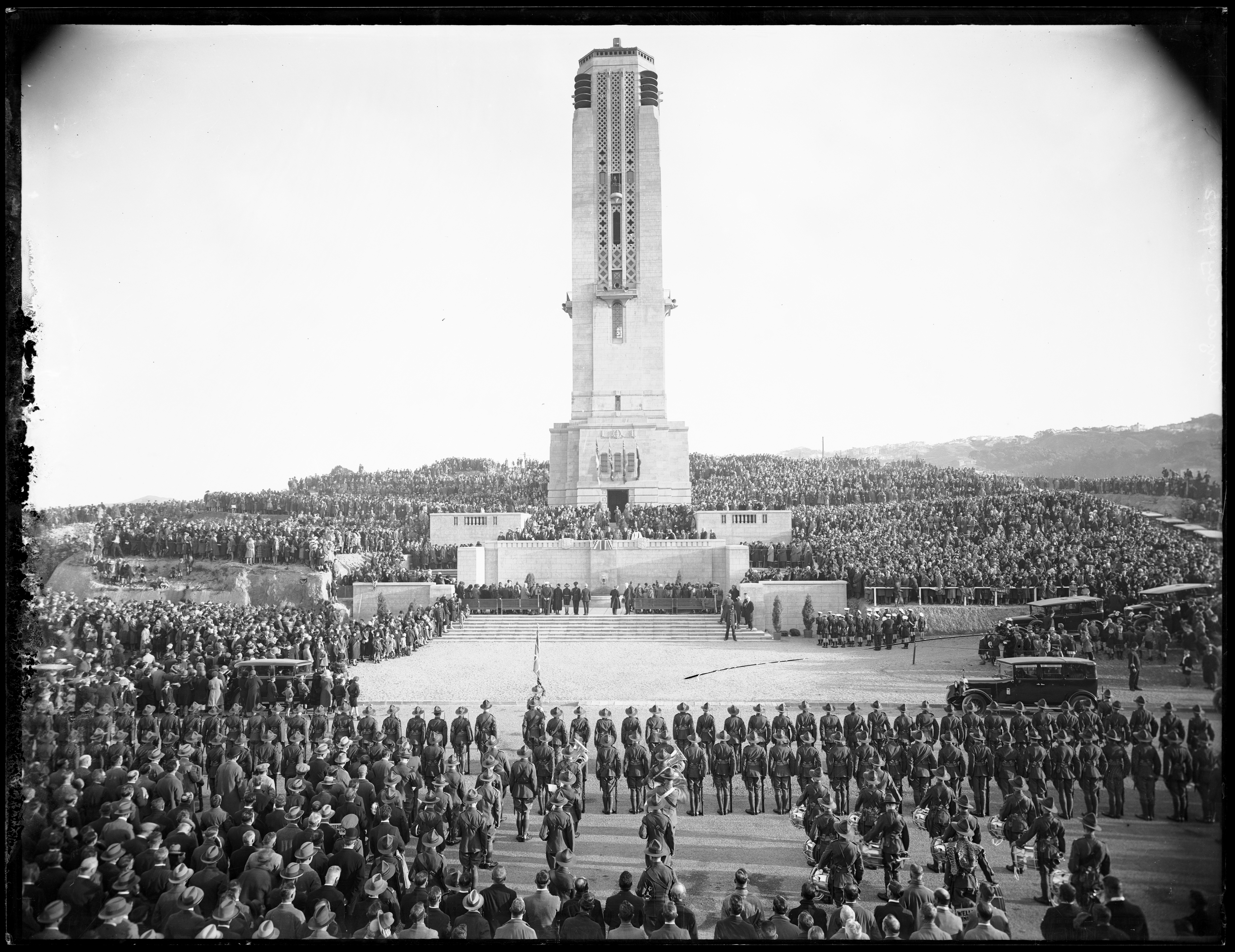
Dedication of the war memorial carillion, Wellington

- 23 February: First session of the 24th Parliament commences.
- 25 April: Dedication ceremony for the New Zealand National War Memorial Carillion in Wellington.
- 10 May: Parliament goes into recess.
- 28 June: The Otago Witness, first published in 1851, produces its last issue.
- 22 September: Parliament recommences.
- 8 December: First session of the 24th Parliament concludes.

== Arts and literature ==
See 1932 in art, 1932 in literature, Category:1932 books

=== Music ===
See: 1932 in music

=== Radio ===
See: Public broadcasting in New Zealand

=== Film ===
See: Category:1932 film awards, 1932 in film, List of New Zealand feature films, Cinema of New Zealand, Category:1932 films

== Sport ==
=== Chess ===
- The 41st National Chess Championship was held in Napier, and was won by G. Gundersen of Melbourne, his second title.

=== Golf ===
- The 22nd New Zealand Open championship was won by Andrew Shaw, his fifth title.
- The 36th National Amateur Championships were held in Wellington
  - Men: Rana Wagg (Hutt) – 2nd title
  - Women: Mrs J.C. Templar

=== Horse racing ===
==== Harness racing ====
- New Zealand Trotting Cup – Harold Logan (2nd win)
- Auckland Trotting Cup – Great Parrish

==== Thoroughbred racing ====
- New Zealand Cup – Fast Passage
- Avondale Gold Cup – Bronze Tray
- Auckland Cup – Fast Passage
- Wellington Cup – Compris
- New Zealand Derby – Silver Scorn

=== Lawn bowls ===
The national outdoor lawn bowls championships are held in Christchurch.

- Men's singles champion – J. Scott (Caledonian Bowling Club)
- Men's pair champions – Bill Bremner, C. Hardley (skip) (West End Bowling Club, Auckland)
- Men's fours champions – K.S. Mackay, Len Keys, C.H. de Launay, M. Walker (skip) (Auckland Bowling Club)

=== Olympic Games ===
Gold	Silver	Bronze	Total
0	1	0	1

=== Rugby ===
Category:Rugby union in New Zealand

- Inaugural Bledisloe Cup won by New Zealand 2–1
- Ranfurly Shield held by Canterbury all season, with defenses against Sth Canterbury 11–5, Auckland 14–0, West Coast 5–3, Wellington 9–8, Buller 13–0, Waikato 17–6

=== Rugby league ===
New Zealand national rugby league team

=== Soccer ===
- The Chatham Cup is won by Wellington Marist who beat Millerton All Blacks 5–0 in the final.
- Provincial league champions:
  - Auckland: YMCA
  - Canterbury: Thistle
  - Hawke's Bay: Napier YMCA
  - Nelson: Athletic
  - Otago: Seacliff
  - Southland: Rangers
  - Taranaki: Albion
  - Waikato: Rotowaro
  - Wanganui: Thistle
  - Wellington: Marist

== Births ==
=== January–February ===
- 1 January – Vinka Lucas, fashion designer and retailer, magazine founder (died 2020)
- 3 January – Stanley James, cricketer (died 2002)
- 6 January – Eunice Eichler, midwife, open adoption advocate (died 2017)
- 9 January – Whetu Tirikatene-Sullivan, politician (died 2011)
- 13 January – Mervyn Edmunds, cricketer (died 2015)
- 18 January – Jock Butterfield, rugby league player (died 2004)
- 20 January – Mervin Sandri, cricketer (died 2016)
- 23 January – Ann Trotter, historian (died 2022)
- 28 January – Keith Roberts, rugby league player and coach (died 2015)
- 31 January – Derek Quigley, politician
- 16 February – Daphne Robinson, cricketer (died 2008)
- 19 February – Ray La Varis, politician (died 1986)
- 20 February – Ann Ballin, psychologist, victims' rights advocate (died 2003)

=== March–April ===
- 1 March – Ranginui Walker, academic, writer (died 2016)
- 4 March – William Norman, cricketer (died 2009)
- 8 March – Pat O'Connor, Roman Catholic priest (died 2014)
- 9 March – Les McNichol, rugby league player (died 2013)
- 10 March – Fred Gerbic, politician (died 1995)
- 15 March – Roger Green, archaeologist (died 2009)
- 16 March – Frank Albrechtsen, association footballer
- 19 March – Ernest Wainscott, cricket umpire
- 24 March – Peter Jones, rugby union player (died 1994)
- 2 April – Joan Fear, painter (died 2022)
- 3 April – John Hooker, novelist (died 2008)
- 13 April – Robert Long, cricketer (died 2010)
- 20 April – Farquhar Wilkinson, cellist (died 2022)

=== May–June ===
- 1 May – Keith Mann, fencer, sports administrator (died 2021)
- 5 May – John Cunneen, Roman Catholic bishop (died 2010)
- 7 May – Krystyna Tomaszyk, writer, social activist (died 2020)
- 12 May – Tom Kneebone, cabaret performer, actor (died 2003)
- 13 May
  - Jan Anderson, plant scientist (died 2015)
  - Thomas Flaws, cricketer (died 2021)
- 21 May – Binney Lock, journalist, newspaper editor (died 2014)
- 23 May
  - Jack Foster, athlete (died 2004)
  - David Stenhouse, biologist, philosopher (died 2013)
- 29 May – Paddy McFarlane, association footballer (died 2013)
- 1 June – Frank Cameron, cricketer (died 2023)
- 4 June – Maurice Shadbolt, writer (died 2004)
- 7 June – Arapera Hineira Kaa Blank, poet, teacher (died 2002)
- 12 June – June Kerr, ballerina (died 2018)
- 23 June – Bob Blair, cricketer

=== July–August ===
- 3 July – Gordon Challis, poet (died 2018)
- 4 July – Ron Horsley, rugby union player (died 2007)
- 5 July – Robert Webster, virologist
- 1 August – Hector Busby, traditional navigator and waka builder (died 2019)
- 2 August
  - Pat Hanly, painter (died 2004)
  - W. H. McLeod, historian (died 2009)
- 7 August – Robin Ferrier, organic chemist (died 2013)
- 20 August – Joseph Churchward, graphic designer, typographer (died 2013)
- 22 August – Barbara van den Broek, architect, landscape architect (died 2001)
- 27 August – John Watkinson, soil scientist (died 2017)
- 31 August – William Frame, cricketer (died 1965)

=== September–October ===
- 4 September – David McIntyre, historian (died 2022)
- 6 September – Ross Jansen, politician, mayor of Hamilton (1977–1989) (died 2010)
- 2 October – Roger Gibbs, swimmer (died 2012)
- 5 October – Barbara Goodman, politician, political hostess (died 2013)
- 17 October – C. K. Stead, academic, writer
- 23 October – Brenda Duncan, cricketer
- 29 October – Alan Preston, association footballer, cricketer (died 2014)

=== November–December ===
- 5 November – Guy Bowers, rugby union player (died 2000)
- 8 November – John Hastie, cricket umpire
- 10 November – Tony Ciprian, broadcaster (died 2015)
- 13 November – Kāterina Mataira, Māori language advocate, teacher, artist, writer (died 2011)
- 15 November – John Lasher, rugby league player, sailor (died 2015)
- 17 November
  - Winifred Griffin, swimmer (died 2018)
  - Donald MacLeod, cricketer (died 2008)
- 1 December – Heather Begg, opera singer (died 2009)
- 4 December – Ian Brackenbury Channell, Wizard of New Zealand
- 6 December – Paul Reeves, Anglican archbishop, Governor-General (1985–1990) (died 2011)
- 7 December – Norman Kingsbury, educational administrator (died 2019)
- 23 December – Bill Gray, rugby union player (died 1993)
- 27 December – Donald Gemmell, rower (died 2022)

=== Exact date unknown ===
- Bob Brockie, biologist, cartoonist
- Titewhai Harawira, Maori activist (died 2023)

== Deaths ==
=== January–March ===
- 14 January – Frank Wells, cricketer (born 1871)
- 30 January – Edward Walter, politician (born 1866)
- 9 February – Charles Wilson, newspaper editor, politician, librarian (born 1857)
- 19 February – Ernest Lee, politician (born 1862)
- 17 March – Mary Gertrude Banahan, Roman Catholic nun, teacher (born c. 1856)

=== April–June ===
- 5 April – Phar Lap, Thoroughbred racehorse (foaled 1926)
- 12 April – Henry Stronach, cricketer (born 1865)
- 16 April – Rutherford Waddell, Presbyterian minister, social reformer, writer (born c. 1851)
- 19 April – Dame Christina Massey, community leader, political hostess (born 1863)
- 5 May – Gloaming, Thoroughbred racehorse (foaled 1915)
- 16 May – William Pember Reeves, politician, historian, poet, social reformer (born 1857)
- 30 May – Hori Pukehika, woodcarver, Te Ati Haunui-a-Pāpārangi leader (born c. 1847)
- 2 June – Thomas Edmonds, businessman and philanthropist (born 1932)
- 24 June
  - Edward Henry Clark, politician (born 1870)
  - Tuiti Makitanara, politician (born 1874)

=== July–September ===
- 17 July – Sidney Luttrell, architect, building contractor (born 1872)
- 3 August – William Bock, engraver, lithographer, medal and stamp designer, publisher (born 1847)
- 20 August – John Cunningham, cricketer (born 1854)
- 2 September – Hester Maclean, nurse, journal editor (born 1859)
- 4 September – Bert Palmer, rugby union player (born 1901)
- 10 September – Hugh Valentine, politician (born 1848)
- 15 September – Frederick Allsop, politician (born 1865)

=== October–December ===
- 5 October – George Carter, politician (born 1864)
- 6 October – Alex Wilson, rugby union player (born 1874)
- 17 October
  - Lewis Allen, rugby union player (born 1870)
  - George Black, politician (born 1903)
- 23 October – Ernest Currie, rugby union player, cricketer (born 1873)
- 16 November – William Nelson, farmer, industrialist (born 1843)
- 22 November – Helen Nicol, suffragist, temperance campaigner (born 1854)
- 24 November – Isabella Fraser, hospital matron (born 1857)
- 10 December – William Butler, sawmiller, timber merchant (born 1858)
- 11 December – James Horn, politician (born 1855)
- 21 December – Harold Livingstone Tapley, politician (born 1875)

== See also ==
- List of years in New Zealand
- Timeline of New Zealand history
- History of New Zealand
- Military history of New Zealand
- Timeline of the New Zealand environment
- Timeline of New Zealand's links with Antarctica
