= Mark Irwin (disambiguation) =

Mark Irwin (born 1950) is a Canadian cinematographer.

Mark Irwin may also refer to:

- Mark Irwin (poet), American poet
- Mark Irwin (rugby union) (1935–2018), New Zealand rugby union player
- Mark Irwin (songwriter), American country music songwriter
