= Sandri =

Sandri is an Italian surname. Notable people with the surname include:

- Anna Maria Sandri (born 1936), Italian actress
- Carl Sandri (born 1983), Australian-born Italian cricketer
- Clemente Ascanio Sandri-Trotti (died 1675), Italian Catholic bishop
- Giovanna Sandri (1923–2002), Italian visual poet
- Giuseppe Sandri (1946–2019), Italian-South African Catholic bishop
- Leonardo Sandri (born 1943), Argentine Catholic cardinal
- Lionello Levi Sandri (1910–1991), Italian politician and European Commissioner
- Lori Sandri (1949–2014), Brazilian football manager
- Matteo Brunori Sandri (born 1994), Italian footballer
- Mervin Sandri (1932–2016), New Zealand former cricketer
- Pepler Sandri (born 1983), South African cricketer
- Sandro Sandri (born 1954), Italian politician
