= William Bock =

William Bock may refer to:

- William Bock (designer) (1847–1932), New Zealand engraver, medal designer and stamp designer
- William George Bock (1884–1973), Canadian politician and farmer
