= Nowland =

Nowland is a surname. Notable people with the surname include:

- Adam Nowland (born 1981), British soccer player
- Ben Nowland (born 1980), American football player
- Clare Nowland (1928–2023), Australian nonagenarian who died after being Tasered by police
- Mark Nowland (born 1962), United States Air Force general
- Mary Josepha Nowland (1863–1935), New Zealand catholic nun and teacher
- Raymond Clare Nowland (1894–1973), Australian architect
