= Frank Wells (disambiguation) =

Frank Wells (1932–1994) was an American businessman.

Frank Wells may also refer to:

- Frank Wells (cricketer) (1871–1932), New Zealand cricketer
- Frank Wells (footballer) (1909–1993), Australian rules footballer
- Frank S. Wells (1865–1958), American politician from Nebraska

== See also ==
- Frank Wels (1909–1982), Dutch football forward
- Frankie Wells (disambiguation)
