= Mina Arndt =

New Zealand artist (1885-1926)

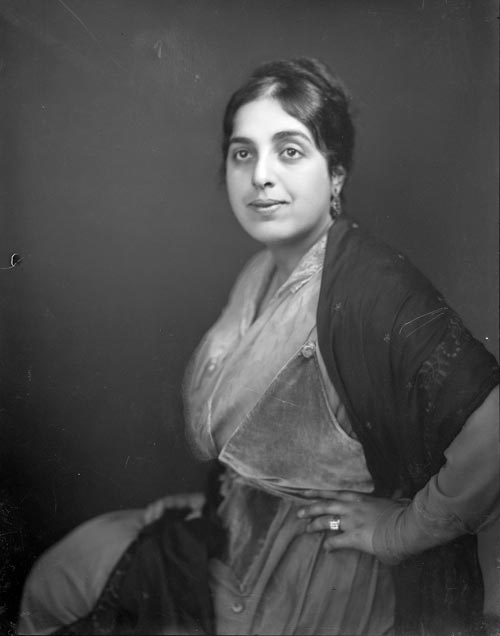
- Born: Hermina Arndt; 18 April 1885; Queenstown, New Zealand
- Died: 22 December 1926 (aged 41); Wellington, New Zealand
- Known for: Painting
- Style: Modernism
- Spouse: Lionel Manoy (m. 1917)
- Relatives: Harry Manoy (brother-in-law)

Hermina "Mina" Arndt (18 April 1885 – 22 December 1926) was a New Zealand artist.

== Biography ==
Arndt was born at Thurlby Domain, near Queenstown on 18 April 1885, the third daughter of Jewish parents Maria and Herman Arndt. Her father died shortly before her birth, and her mother moved the family to Dunedin where Mina attended Otago Girls' High School. Later in Wellington, she attended art classes at the technical college before embarking for Europe.

In 1906, Arndt was living in London studying under Frank Brangwyn at the London School of Art in Kensington. While there she met German printmaker Hermann Struck, who invited her to study etching with him in Berlin, which was considered an honour as he rarely took pupils. Soon after, in 1907, Arndt became involved with the Newlyn School in Cornwall and worked with Stanhope Forbes, Laura and Harold Knight. She returned to Berlin, living with her sisters and in 1911 renting a studio in Lietzenburgstrasse. While in Berlin she studied with Lovis Corinth at his art school in Klopstockstrasse, and his influence is cited in her works such as The Red Hat (c.1914). Later, Arndt showed at the Royal Academy and in Paris at the Société des Artistes Français, where her painting "The Model" was exhibited in 1913. In 1914, after being briefly interned in Germany after the outbreak of World War I, she returned to New Zealand permanently.

In February 1915, The Evening Post newspaper visited her studio in Willis Street, Wellington and commented that her work had a "strong, almost masculine character...Free, firm, broad, sure strokes, and never a suspicion of pretty-prettiness." The same article referred to works in her studio in a variety of media: charcoal, oils, etchings and drypoints. The artist herself singled out an oil portrait of a woman in her fifties, as one which had attracted much attention and high praise, while the Post's reviewer praised another oil portrait of a woman wearing an orange shawl, as "startling".

In March 1915 she held a large exhibition of works she had brought back with her from Europe. The catalogue listed ten of the 93 works as oils but by far the majority were etchings and charcoal drawings. A review in the Evening Post noted she had also been commissioned to paint a number of Māori portraits. However, her etchings and charcoal drawings proved more acceptable to the New Zealand public than her canvases, which were felt to be too dark and solemn for local tastes.

She married Lionel Manoy in Wellington on 14 February 1917. The couple moved to Motueka and had one son. Arndt continued working, drawing on the local landscape and her young son and step-daughter as subjects. She established a summer school for painters at Motueka and held classes. She also gave classes in New Plymouth when visiting one of her sisters who lived there. At the age of 41, she died at her sister's residence in Wellington on 22 December 1926 of nephritis, and was buried at Karori Cemetery.

Retrospective exhibitions of her work were held by the Suter Gallery in Nelson (1960) and the New Zealand Academy of Fine Arts in Wellington in 1961.

== Gallery ==
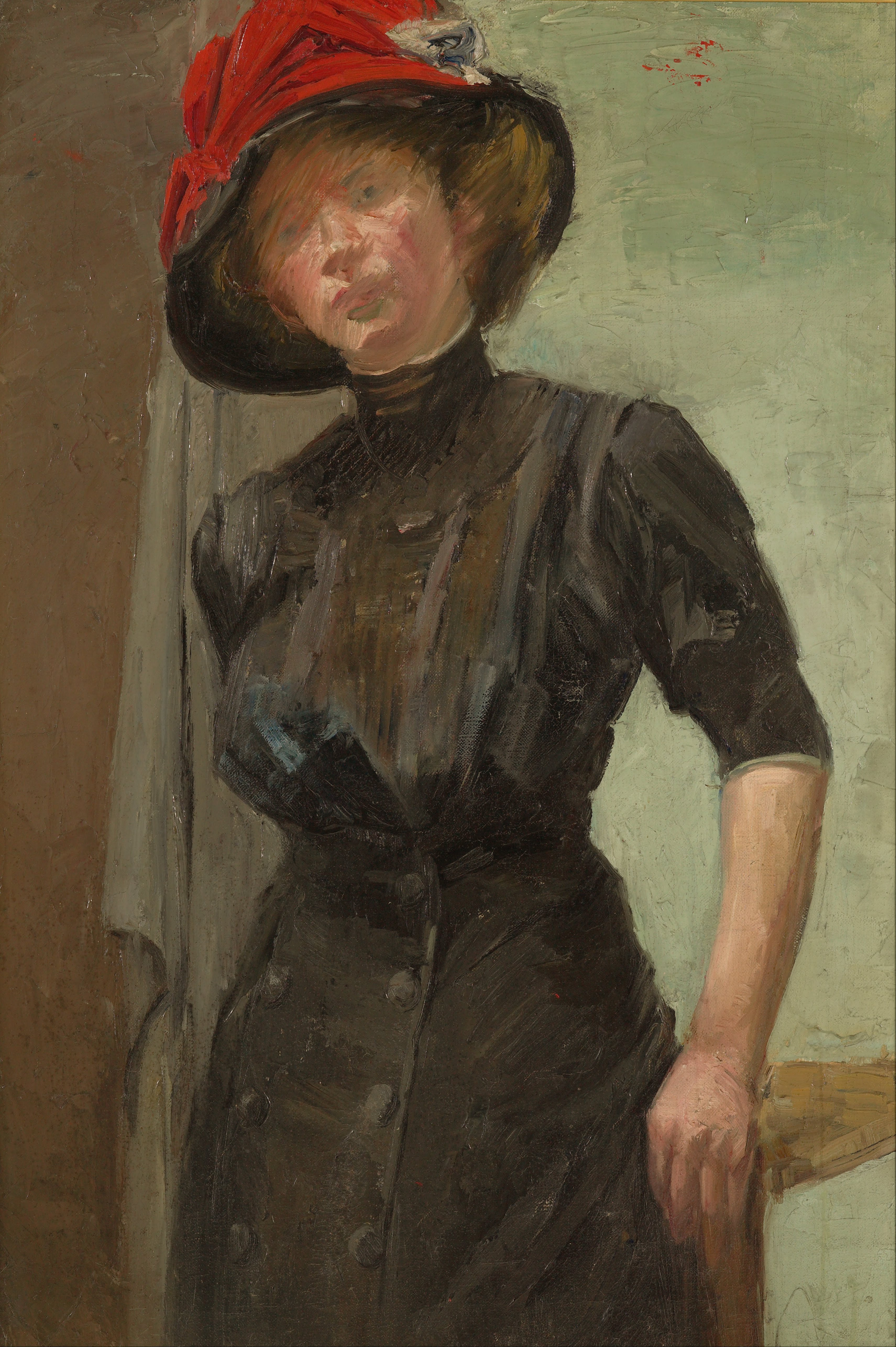
The Red Hat, c. 1914

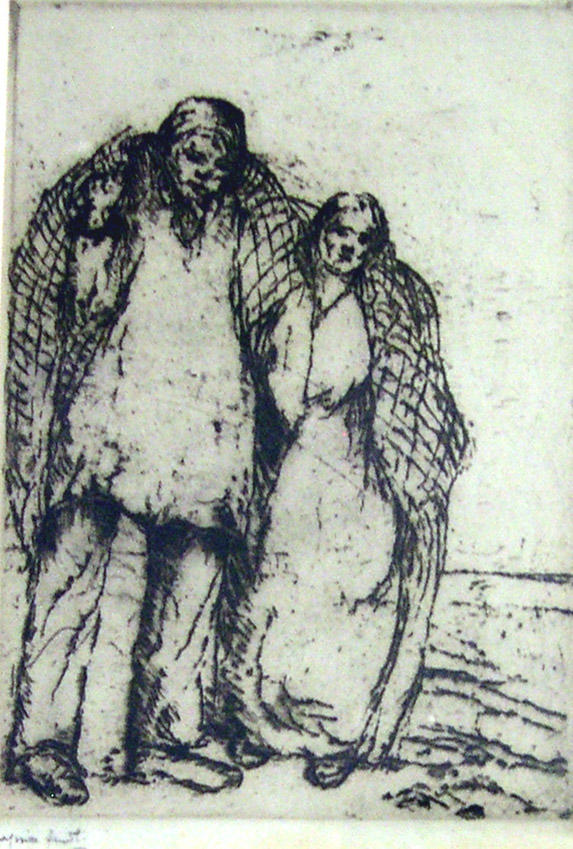
Carrying the Nets

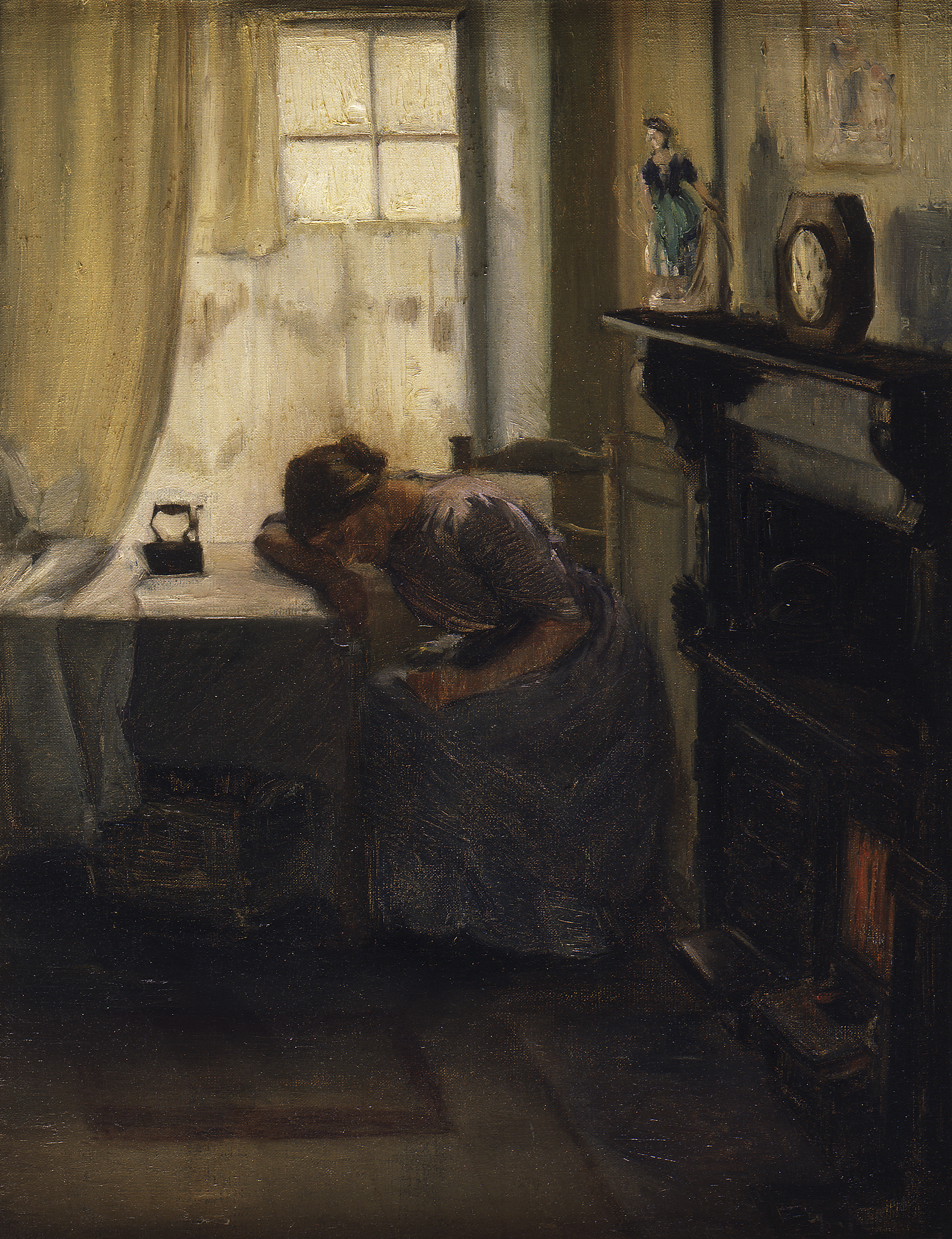
Tired

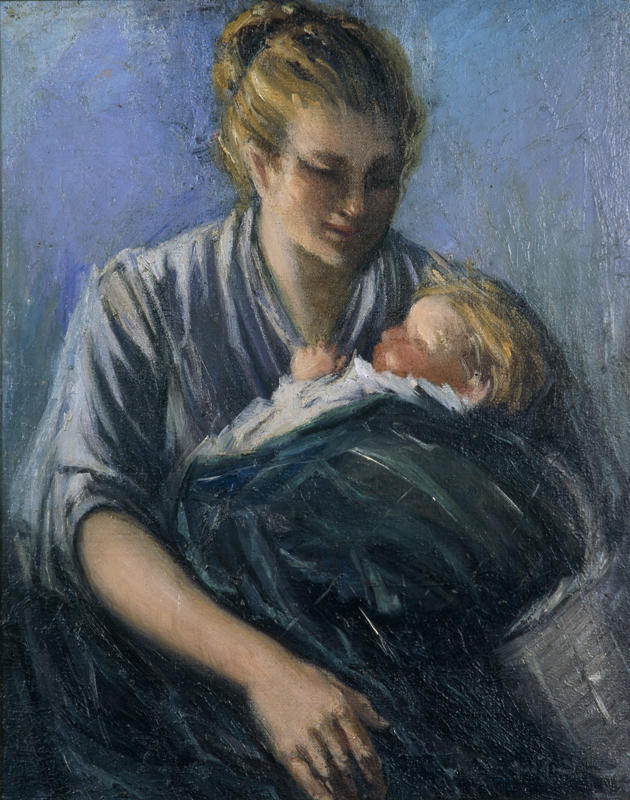
Mother and Child
