= Frankie Wells =

Frankie Wells may refer to:

- Frankie Wells, fictional character in Blessed Event
- Frankie Wells, fictional character in List of Person of Interest episodes

== See also ==
- Frank Wells (disambiguation)
