= Ron Horsley (rugby union) =

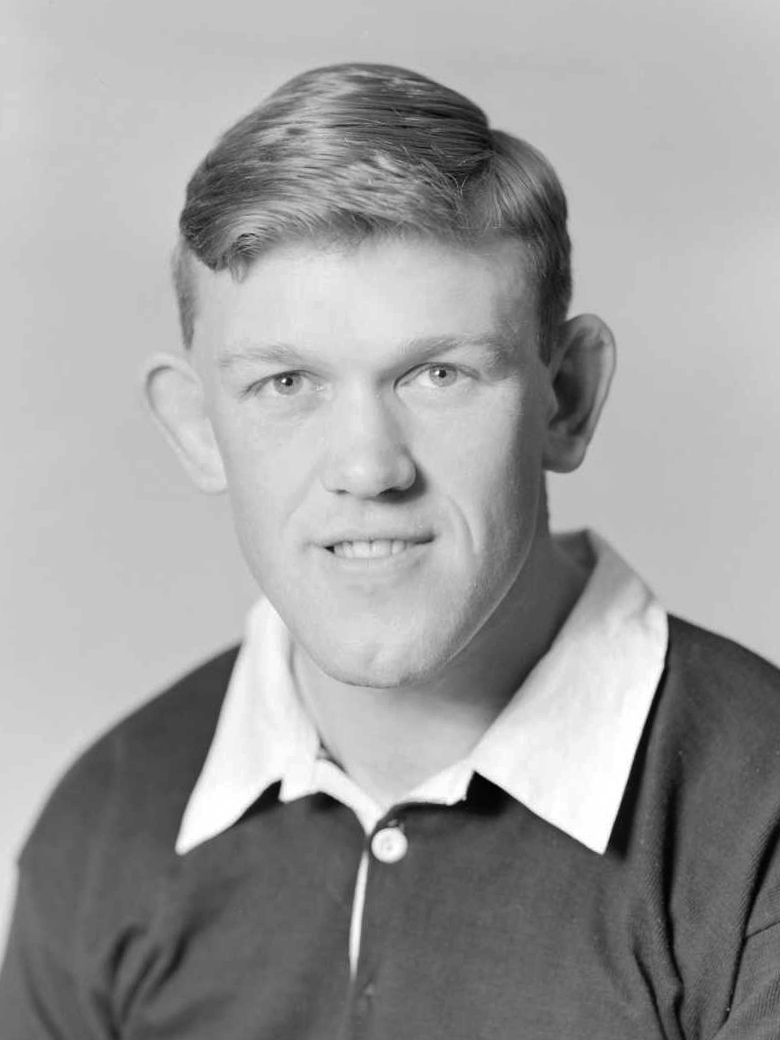
- Horsley in 1958
- Born: Ronald Hugh Horsley; 4 July 1932 Wellington, New Zealand
- Died: 20 December 2007 (aged 75) Rotorua, New Zealand
- Height: 1.94 m (6 ft 4 in)
- Weight: 101 kg (223 lb)
- School: Rongotai College
- Occupation: Hotel proprietor

Rugby union career
- Position: Lock
Provincial / State sides
Years	Team	Apps	(Points)
1956–1961	Wellington		
1962–1964	Manawatu	37	
International career
Years	Team	Apps	(Points)
1960–1964	New Zealand	3	(0)

Ronald Hugh Horsley (4 July 1932 – 20 December 2007) was a New Zealand rugby union player. A lock, Horsley represented Wellington and Manawatu at a provincial level, and was a member of the New Zealand national side, the All Blacks, between 1960 and 1964. He played 31 matches for the All Blacks including three internationals. After retiring as a player, Horsley went on to serve as a selector for the Nelson (1966), Golden Bay-Motueka (1967–1968) and Nelson Bays (1969–1970) unions. A Rotarian, Horsley served as a district governor (district 9930) from 1998 to 1999.
