= Harry Manoy =

New Zealand rugby union administrator

President of the New Zealand Rugby Union
- In office 5 May 1927 – 3 May 1928
- Preceded by: Cecil McDavitt
- Succeeded by: George Maddison

Personal details
- Born: Henry Manoy; 24 November 1879; Napier, New Zealand
- Died: 15 December 1954 (aged 75); Motueka, New Zealand
- Relatives: Mina Arndt (sister-in-law)
- Education: Nelson College
- Occupation: Merchant

Henry Manoy (24 November 1879 – 15 December 1954) was a New Zealand merchant and sports administrator. He served as president of the New Zealand Rugby Football Union from 1927 to 1928.

== Early life and family ==
Manoy was born in Napier in 1879, the son of Jewish Russian storekeeper and merchant Abraham Manoy and Australian-born Maria Moss. They moved to Motueka in 1882, and Manoy was educated at Nelson College from 1894 to 1896. After 10 years working in Wellington and South Africa, he returned to Motueka, where he joined his father to form A. Manoy and Sons, a general merchants company. His brother Lionel's second wife was the painter Mina Arndt.

== Sports administration ==
Manoy was a strong advocate for the formation of the Golden Bay-Motueka Rugby Union, and went on to serve as that union's president. He was elected president of the New Zealand Rugby Football Union in 1927 for a one-year term, and was also active as a foundation member of the Motueka golf and bowling clubs, and as an official of the Motueka athletics club.

== Death ==
Manoy died in Motueka in 1954. He had never married.
