= William Bock (designer) =

New Zealand engraver

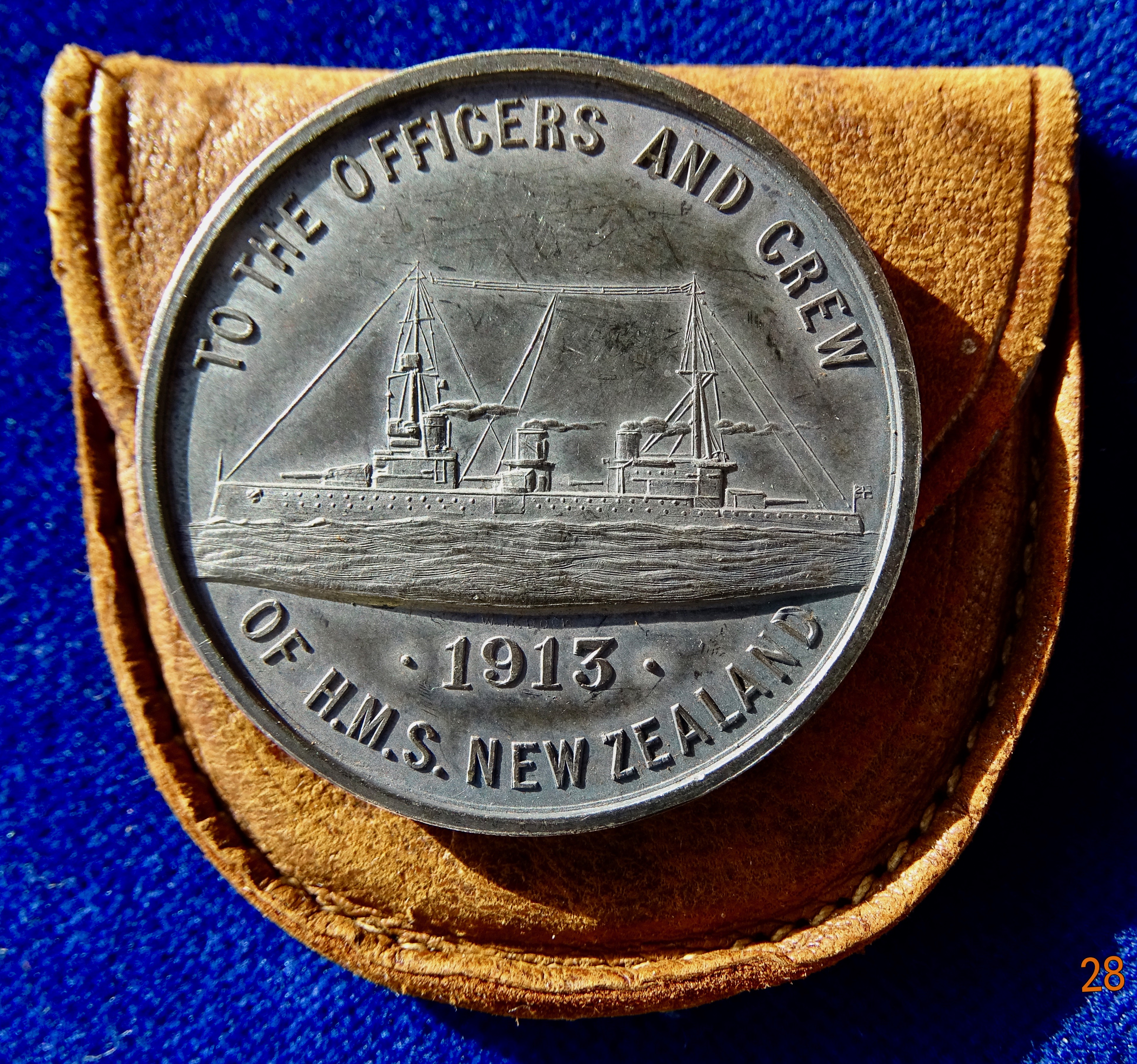
H.M.S. New Zealand 1913 on the obverse of his medal

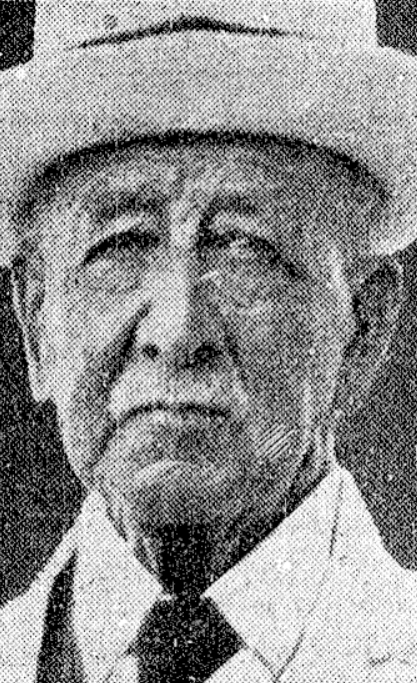
Bock in 1928

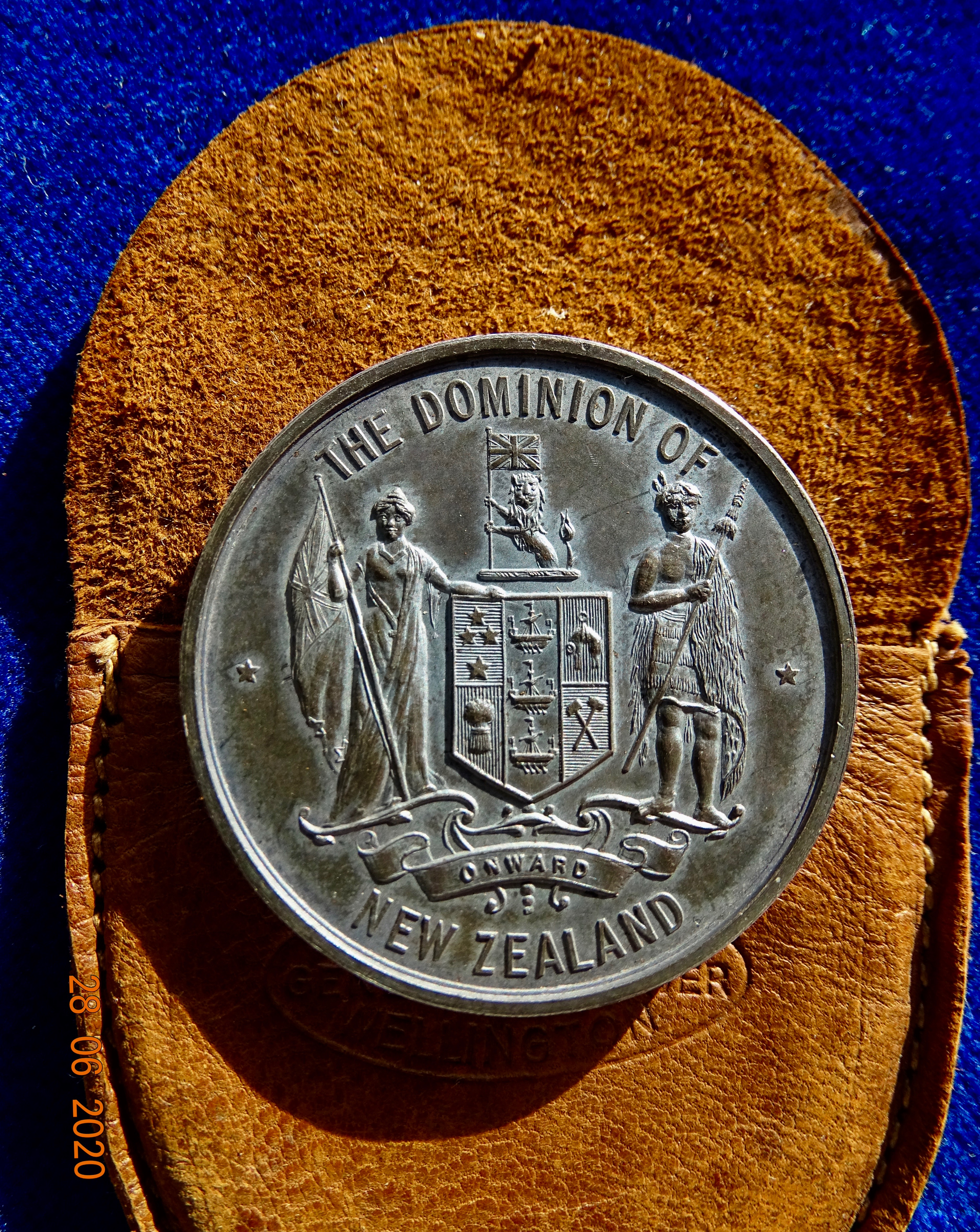
The reverse of this medal shows the coat of arms of the Dominion of New Zealand

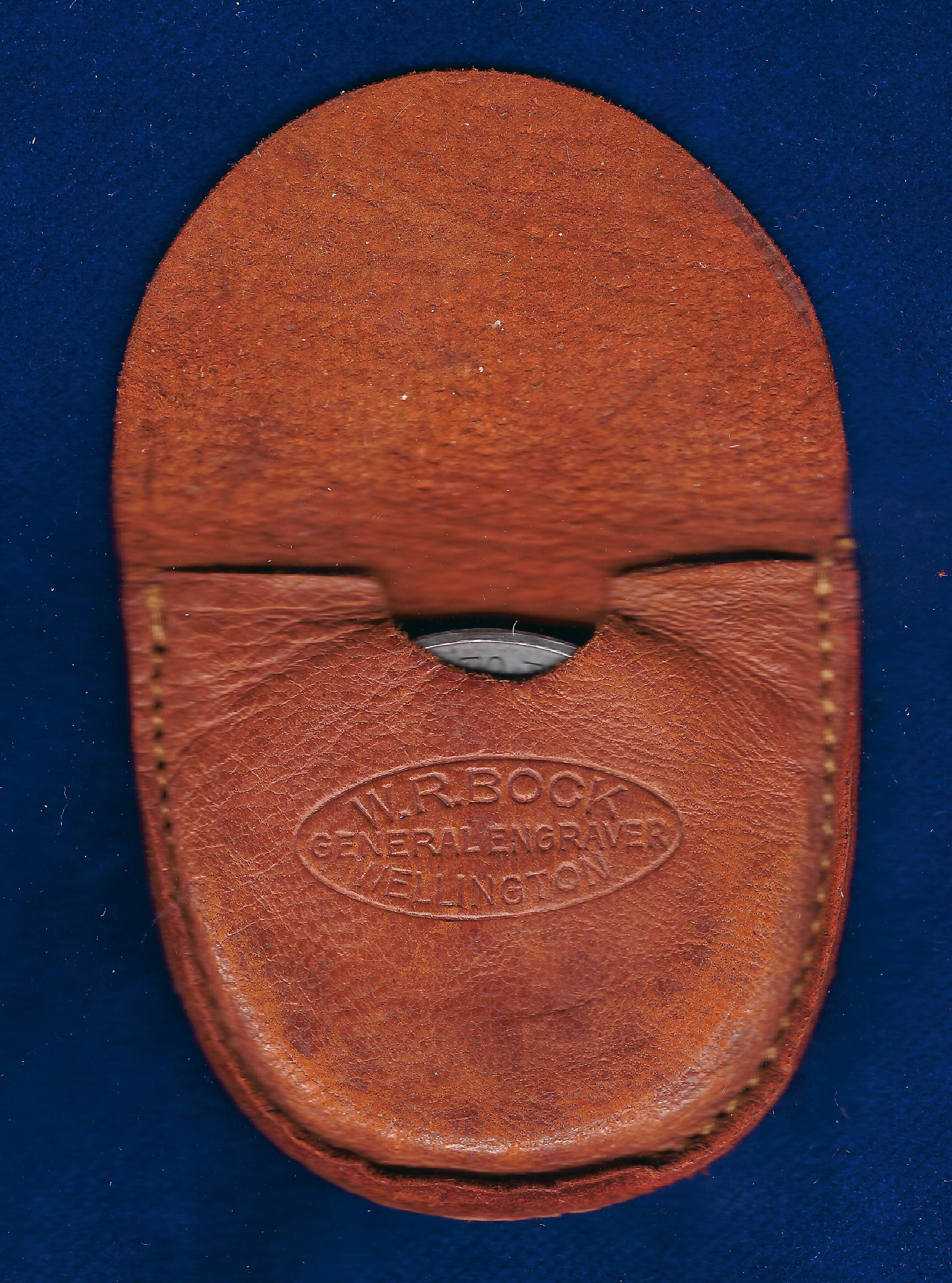
The medal pouch embossed with Bock's business logo

William Rose Bock (5 January 1847 – 3 August 1932) was a New Zealand engraver, medal designer, illuminator, stamp designer, lithographer and publisher.

== Life and career ==
Bock was born in Hobart, Tasmania, where his father Thomas Bock was a notable engraver, lithographer and daguerrotypist, important for his paintings of Tasmanian Aborigines. Bock left for New Zealand in 1868, settling in Wellington. In the 1870s he was responsible for the design and preparation of the dies for the first fiscal and postage stamps to be produced wholly in New Zealand.

In 1878 Bock founded his own firm, in Wellington, New Zealand, first with Henry Elliot and then with Alfred Ernest Cousins. His firm Bock and Cousins published The Art Album of New Zealand Flora by Sarah Featon and her husband, Edward Featon, in 1889. It was the first fully coloured book to be printed in New Zealand. He designed and illuminated many formal addresses to members of the Royal Family. He was the manufacturer of the medal that was presented by the City of Auckland to the officers and crew of HMS New Zealand during the battleship's visit to Auckland in 1913.

Bock was also a cricketer who represented Wellington in minor matches in the 1870s. Later he became an umpire. He umpired eight first-class cricket matches in Wellington between 1909 and 1928. He turned 81 the day before his final match, between Wellington and Otago at the Basin Reserve. He is the only known octogenarian to have stood as an umpire in a first-class match anywhere in the world. He was also a singer, especially active in choirs up until his death.

Bock's wife Rebecca died at their home in the Wellington suburb of Newtown in March 1915. They had two sons and two daughters. Bock died at his home in the suburb of Hataitai in August 1932, aged 85. His company, W. G. Bock and Sons, was carried on by his descendants, and was still being run by a great-great grandson in 1988.
