= John Gully (artist) =

New Zealand landscape painter

- Born: 1819; Bath, England
- Died: 1 November 1888 (aged 69); Nelson, New Zealand
- Known for: landscape paintings

John Gully (1819 – 1 November 1888) was a New Zealand landscape painter.

== Early and personal life ==
He was born in Bath, and was the son of Philip Gully, a porter, and Mary Vincent. Gully's formal education finished when he was apprenticed to Stothert's foundry aged around 13. He worked in the designing and drafting department. He received some training in painting from a Bristol watercolourist, W. J. Muller. Having finished his apprenticeship, he got a job as a clerk in the Bath Savings Bank, then later joined his father's business in that city. He was probably already painting as a pastime, and—apart from a few private lessons—received no formal art training.

On 22 July 1846 John Gully married Jane Moore, a young widow with a baby son and the daughter of John Eyles. They went on to have six children, two of whom died in childhood.

In 1852 Jane and John decided to emigrate with their family of three children to New Zealand. John Gully was influenced by his reading of Hursthouse's glowing account of New Zealand titled Account of the Settlement of New Plymouth. The family sailed out from London on 23 December 1851 on the John Phillips, a small barque. They arrived in Auckland on 5 April 1852, where after a month the ship proceeded to the settlement of New Plymouth finally arriving at their destination on 9 May 1852.

The Gully family settled at Omata, and purchased the Omata Store in 1854. However, there were not enough settlers to support it, and from 1856 he was in financial difficulties. In 1858 bankruptcy forced Gully to move to New Plymouth, where he engaged in casual clerical work. He also advertised his availability to paint views of properties for sending overseas. He served as a volunteer during the later Land Wars but was invalided out of the army as the hard conditions were too severe for his constitution.

On 31 July 1860, Gully and his family left New Plymouth on the Airedale for the city of Nelson, where he spent the rest of his life. He purchased a house in Trafalgar Street with a large, sunny garden and orchard. Gully was fond of gardening. He also built a large studio which became a gathering place for his friends and family.

== Career ==
He was encouraged by the geologist Julius von Haast, who commissioned him to complete 12 watercolours of Canterbury mountains and glaciers to illustrate a lecture given by Haast at the Royal Geographical Society in London in 1864.

He became the part-time drawing master at Nelson College, but because he was self-taught and not schooled in classical style he was not popular with the principal. Gully continued to teach informally - one of his students was Frances Fletcher, whose works are now held in the Alexander Turnbull Library. Eventually in 1863, with assistance of his friend, politician and amateur painter James Crowe Richmond (whom he had met while in New Plymouth), Gully was appointed as a full-time draughtsman at the Nelson provincial survey office. James Crowe Richmond was a lifelong friend of Gully's and his companion in many painting expeditions. He continued to paint in his spare time until 1878 when he was able to resign his position to paint full-time. He was a popular artist during his lifetime and is now regarded as one of New Zealand's foremost landscape painters.

Painting almost entirely in watercolour, Gully often went on sketching trips and filled sketch-books with careful pencil studies and numerous quick-wash drawings both in colour and sepia.

Gully's large watercolours became immensely popular at Art Society shows. He sold all of the watercolours he submitted to the 'New Zealand Exhibition' in Dunedin in 1865 before the exhibition even opened and won a silver medal. He exhibited at the Royal Academy in 1871 and in 1873 sent 9 paintings to the New Zealand court at the International Industrial Exhibition in Vienna. In 1886, he exhibited at the Colonial and Indian Exhibition in London and the 'Intercolonial Exhibition' in Melbourne. He also exhibited works with the Society of British Watercolour Artists in London. His last big exhibition was the 'Wellington Industrial Exhibition' of 1885. In 1889, a year after his death, the New Zealand and South Seas Exhibition (1889) in Dunedin featured a special showing of his works.

Gully died on 1 November 1888 at the age of sixty-nine after a long and painful illness. He was survived by his wife Jane and four sons and a daughter.

== Fakes and forgeries ==
Karl Sim, also known as Carl Feoder Goldie (6 December 1923 – 21 October 2013) was a New Zealand art forger. Among the group of artists Sim claimed to have faked and sold on were works by John Gully.

== Notes ==
- John Gully Catalogue 43. Auckland City Art Gallery, 1966
- An Encyclopedia of New Zealand 1966
- Gully, J. S. "Gully, John". Dictionary of New Zealand Biography. Ministry for Culture and Heritage.
