= Guy Bowers =

New Zealand rugby union player

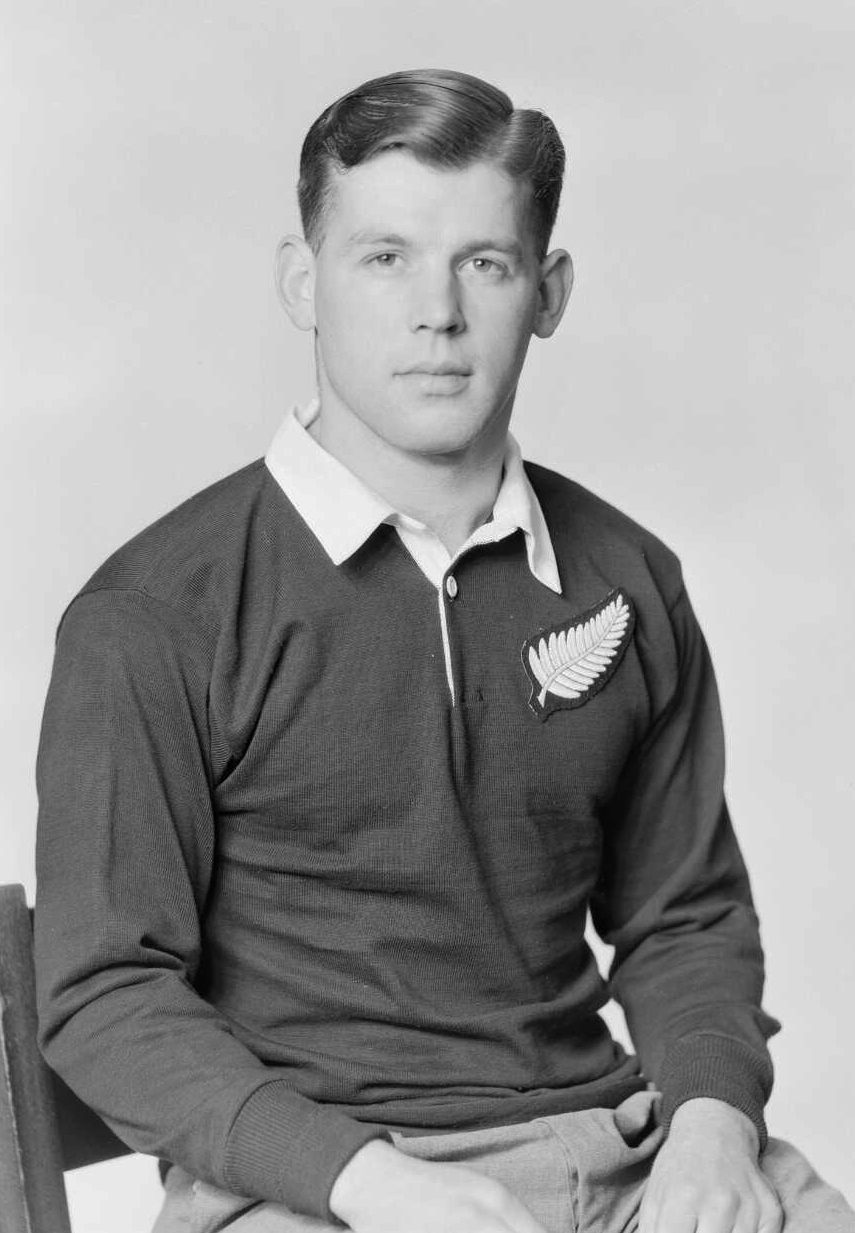
- Bowers in 1953
- Born: Richard Guy Bowers; 5 November 1932 Rawhiti, New Zealand
- Died: 11 June 2000 (aged 67) Motueka, New Zealand
- Height: 1.70 m (5 ft 7 in)
- Weight: 70 kg (150 lb)
- School: Nelson College
- Occupation: Tobacco farmer

Rugby union career
- Position: First five-eighth
Provincial / State sides
Years	Team	Apps	(Points)
1953–54	Wellington		
1955–60, 1962	Golden Bay-Motueka		
International career
Years	Team	Apps	(Points)
1953–54	New Zealand	2	(0)

Richard Guy Bowers (5 November 1932 – 11 June 2000) was a New Zealand rugby union player. A first five-eighth, Bowers represented Wellington and Golden Bay-Motueka at a provincial level, and was a member of the New Zealand national side, the All Blacks, from 1953 to 1954. He played 15 matches for the All Blacks including two internationals.
