= Tom Flaws =

New Zealand cricketer (1932–2021)

Personal information
- Full name: Thomas Flaws
- Born: 13 May 1932; Dunedin, Otago, New Zealand
- Died: 24 June 2021 (aged 89); Dunedin, Otago, New Zealand
- Batting: Left-handed
- Role: Wicket-keeper

Domestic team information
- Years: Team
- 1952/53–1962/63: Otago
- 1964/65–1965/66: Central Otago

Career statistics
| Competition | First-class |
|---|---|
| Matches | 27 |
| Runs scored | 438 |
| Batting average | 10.18 |
| 100s/50s | 0/0 |
| Top score | 35 |
| Catches/stumpings | 44/29 |
- Source: Cricinfo, 8 July 2021

Thomas Flaws (13 May 1932 – 24 June 2021) was a New Zealand cricketer. A wicket-keeper, he played 27 first-class matches for Otago between the 1952–53 and 1962–63 seasons.

Flaws was born at Dunedin in 1932. He played club cricket for Kaikorai in the city where he was known as an "excellent fieldsman". He played age-group for Otago, practiced with the senior team as early as the 1950–51 season, and in the same season scored a century against Southland cricket team in the Brabin Shield competition for under-21 teams.

By the start of the 1952–53 season Flaws was considered a "promising young wicket-keeper and forceful batsman" and was thought to have "excellent prospects of reading international class". He was, however, behind established 'keeper George Mills in the Otago side and, in the event, made his senior representative debut for the side playing as a specialist batsman against Canterbury in December 1952. he scored four runs on debut in his only innings, but retained his place in the side for the rest of Otago's Plunket Shield fixtures, scoring a total of 57 runs with a highest score of 21.

Flaws was kept out of the Otago side by Mills throughout much of the 1950s, only playing a single senior match for the provincial side in 1953–54 and none in the following two seasons. He played in all five of Otago's first-class matches in 1956–57 with Mills out of the side, but scored only 30 runs during the season and did not play at all during following two seasons. With Mills retired, he came back into the side for the final two matches of the 1959–60 season and then kept wicket regularly for the following three seasons.

During the 1960–61 season Flaws briefly held the record for the most wicket-keeping dismissals in the Plunket Shield season with 21―13 catches and eight stumpings―before being overtaken by Trevor McMahon who effected five dismissals in the final innings of the final match of the season between Otago and Wellington, beating Flaws by a single dismissal. During the same season he was part of a record eighth wicket partnership for Otago, scoring 35 runs―his highest first-class score―in a partnership of 149 with Bert Sutcliffe against Northern Districts at Seddon Park. The record partnership was not exceeded by Otago until the 2012–13 season.

In total Flaws played in 27 first-class matches for Otago, scoring 438 runs, taking 44 catches and effecting 29 stumpings. he played Hawke Cup cricket for Central Otago in 1964–65 and 1965–66, but did not play for the Otago side after the end of the 1962–63 season. He died at Dunedin in 2021 aged 89.
