= Victorine Goddard =

New Zealand homemaker and hotel-keeper (1844–1935)

Victorine Goddard (née Rogers; October 1844 – 12 October 1935) was a New Zealand homemaker and hotel-keeper. She was born in Waiwhakaiho, Taranaki, New Zealand, on 5 October 1844.
