= John Anslow =

New Zealand field hockey player

Personal information
- Born: 6 October 1935 Kadavu, Fiji
- Died: 6 April 2017 (aged 81)
- Height: 1.73 m (5 ft 8 in)
- Weight: 73 kg (161 lb)

Sport
- Country: New Zealand
- Sport: Field hockey

John Anslow (6 October 1935 – 6 April 2017) was a New Zealand field hockey player. He competed at the 1964 Summer Olympics and the 1968 Summer Olympics.

Anslow died on 6 April 2017.
