= John Watkinson (chemist) =

New Zealand soil chemist (1932–2017)

- Born: John Herbert Watkinson; 27 August 1932
- Died: 14 February 2017 (aged 84); Hamilton, New Zealand
- Education: Victoria University of Wellington
- Scientific career
- Fields: Soil chemistry
- Workplaces: Ruakura Agricultural Research Centre
- Thesis: The kinetics of ion exchange in soil (1969)
- Doctoral advisor: Alex T. Wilson

John Herbert Watkinson (27 August 1932 – 14 February 2017) was a New Zealand soil chemist.

Watkinson studied at Victoria University College, graduating with a BSc in 1953. He later completed a PhD at the same institution in 1969, following its attainment of autonomy as Victoria University of Wellington. His thesis, supervised by Alex Wilson, was titled The kinetics of ion exchange in soil. Watkinson worked at the Ruakura Agricultural Research Centre, and he is noted for developing the fluorometric determination of selenium in biological samples, and his research into selenium fertilisers and the determination of the optimum particle sizes for elemental sulphur and reactive phosphate rock. He was elected a Fellow of the Royal Society of New Zealand in 1994, and was also a Fellow of the New Zealand Institute for Advanced Studies. His chief laboratory chemist at Ruakura was Grant Ardern who later continued his own career in healthcare informatics. John was married to June Watkinson.

Watkinson died aged 84 in Hamilton on 14 February 2017.
