= Frances Fletcher =

New Zealand artist

- Born: 1846
- Died: 5 March 1935

Frances Ann Fletcher (née Stamper; 1846 – 5 March 1935) was a New Zealand artist. Her works are held in the collection of the Alexander Turnbull Library.

== Biography ==
Fletcher was the daughter of barrister W. John Stamper. Fletcher was based in Nelson, New Zealand, and was the pupil of landscape painter John Gully.

In 1864 she married a Christchurch merchant, John Johnston Fletcher, and moved to Christchurch, where she was a popular hostess and mixed with local intellectuals. The Fletchers had five children, including a son who was killed in World War I.

Fletcher was widowed in 1889, and she subsequently made two visits to Europe. In 1918, she moved to Auckland, and exhibited with the Auckland Society of Arts, and contributed articles to Theosophical Society magazines. Fletcher was a foundation member of the Penwomen's Club in about 1926, and took an active role in its affairs until shortly before her death.

Fletcher died at her home in the Auckland suburb of Remuera on 5 March 1935, and her ashes were buried at Waikumete Cemetery.
