= Mansfield Rangi =

New Zealand cricket umpire

Personal information
- Born: 8 March 1935
- Died: 14 February 1987 (aged 51)

Umpiring information
- ODIs umpired: 1 (1976)
- Source: Cricinfo, 27 May 2014

Mansfield Rangi (8 March 1935 – 14 February 1987) was a New Zealand cricket umpire. He stood in a single One Day International game, in 1976.

== See also ==
- List of One Day International cricket umpires
