= William Frame (cricketer) =

New Zealand cricketer

Personal information
- Full name: William David Frame
- Born: 31 August 1932; Mosgiel, New Zealand
- Died: 12 February 1965 (aged 32); Papanui, New Zealand
- Batting: Right-handed
- Bowling: Right-arm medium-fast

Domestic team information
- Years: Team
- 1955/56–1957/58: Otago
- Source: Cricinfo, 10 May 2016

William Frame (31 August 1932 – 12 February 1965) was a New Zealand cricketer. He played seven first-class matches for Otago between the 1955–56 and 1957–58 seasons.

Frame was born at Mosgiel in Otago in 1932 and educated at Otago Boys' High School in Dunedin. He worked as a fruiterer. A right-arm opening bowler, on his first-class debut against Canterbury in December 1955 he took five wickets in each innings.

In February 1965, Frame shot dead his girlfriend and her parents, before turning the gun on himself. He was a cousin of the New Zealand author Janet Frame.
