= Kevin Percy =

New Zealand field hockey player (1935–2019)

Personal information
- Born: 15 May 1935 Masterton, New Zealand
- Died: 2 September 2019 (aged 84) Hastings, New Zealand
- Height: 1.80 m (5 ft 11 in)

Sport
- Country: New Zealand
- Sport: Field hockey

Kevin Percy (15 May 1935 – 2 September 2019) was a Team New Zealand field hockey player. He competed in the men's tournament at the 1960 Summer Olympics.

Percy died in Hastings on 2 September 2019.
