= Mervyn Edmunds =

New Zealand cricketer

Personal information
- Full name: Mervyn Ray Edmunds
- Born: 13 January 1932; Wellington, New Zealand
- Died: 27 August 2015 (aged 83); Dunedin, Otago, New Zealand
- Batting: Right-handed
- Role: Wicket-keeper

Domestic team information
- Years: Team
- 1958/59–1959/60: Otago
- Source: CricInfo, 24 May 2020

Mervyn Ray Edmunds (13 January 1932 – 27 August 2015) was a New Zealand cricketer. He played nine first-class matches for Otago during the 1958–59 and 1959–60 seasons.
