= Stanley James =

New Zealand cricketer

Stanley Neville James (3 January 1932 – 12 October 2002) was a New Zealand cricketer. He was a right-handed batsman and right-arm medium-pace bowler who played a single match for Otago during the 1953–54 season.

James was born at Wanganui in 1932. He worked as an assistant superintendent. His only senior representative match for Otago came against the touring Fiji team. He did not bat during the match and took a single wicket.

James died at Wanganui in 2002. An obituary was published in the 2003 New Zealand Cricket Almanack.
