= Edmund Bohan =

New Zealand historian (1935–2024)

Edmund Bohan MNZM
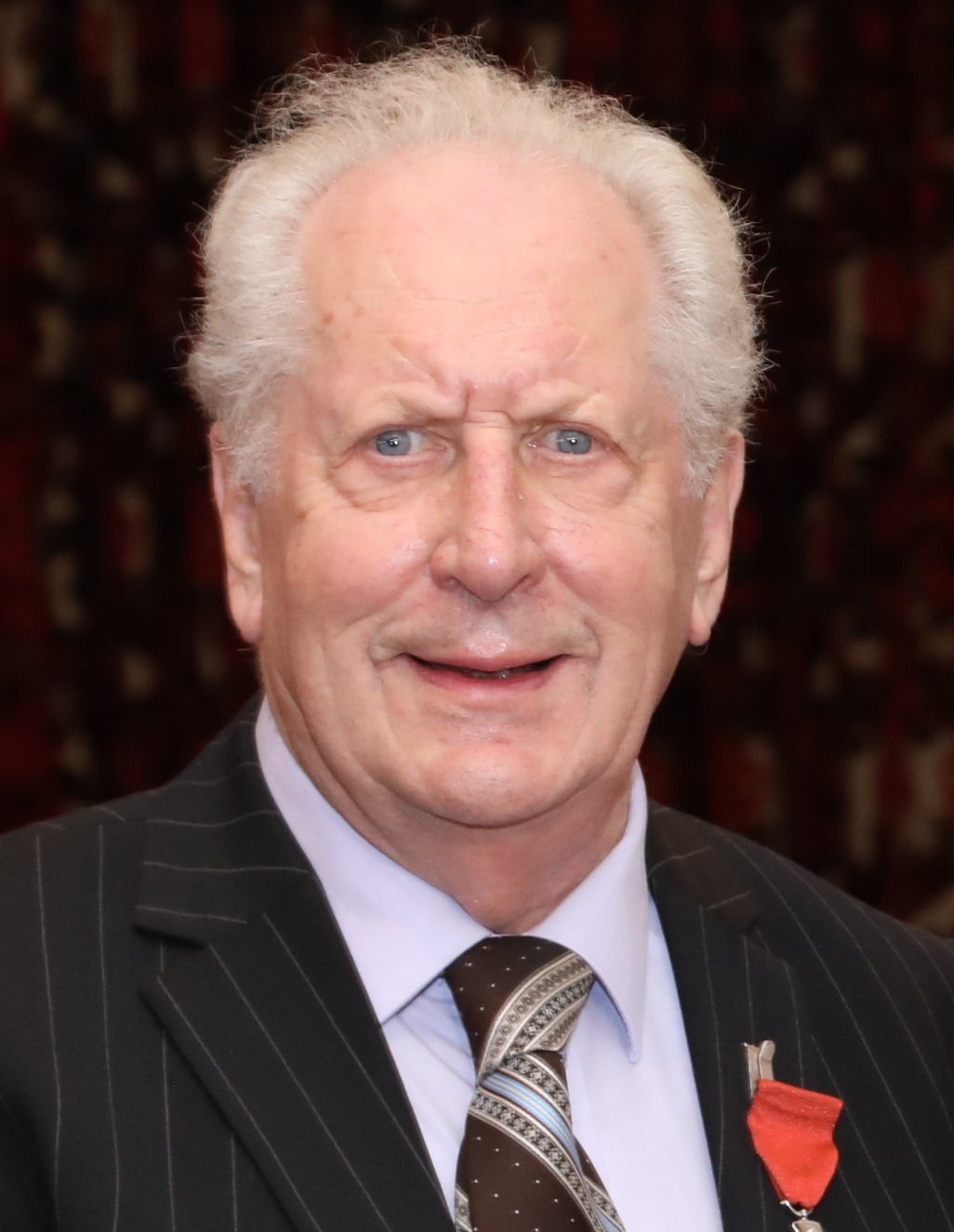
- Bohan in 2019
- Born: 5 October 1935; Christchurch, New Zealand
- Died: 23 March 2024 (aged 88); Christchurch, New Zealand
- Occupations: Historian; biographer; novelist; singer; author
- Writing career
- Language: English

Edmund Bohan MNZM, also known as Ned Bohan (5 October 1935 – 23 March 2024), was a New Zealand historian, biographer, novelist, singer, and author.

In the 2019 New Year Honours, Bohan was appointed a Member of the New Zealand Order of Merit, for services to music, historical research, and literature.

He died at Christchurch's Nurse Maude Hospice on 23 March 2024.

He explained his approach to writing to Rachel McAlpine as follows: “My literary attitude is comparatively simple, and the same as my historical attitude. I’m a story teller: I want to know what happened."

== Published works ==
=== Political Biographies ===
- Edward Stafford: New Zealand's First Statesman (Hazard Press, 1994).
- Blest Madman: FitzGerald of Canterbury (Canterbury University Press, 1998).
- To Be a Hero: a biography of Sir George Grey (HarperCollins 1998).

=== Historical Detective Novels ===
- The Opawa Affair (Hazard Press, 1996).
- The Dancing Man (Hazard Press, 1997).
- The Matter of Parihaka (Hazard Press, 1999).
- Singing Historian: A Memoir (Canterbury University Press, 2012).
