= Barbara van den Broek =

New Zealand born Australian architect and landscape architect

- Born: August 22, 1932; New Zealand
- Died: August 24, 2001 (aged 69)
- Education: University of Auckland
- Occupations: Architect and Landscape architect
- Projects: Queensland Cultural Centre, Queensland Art Gallery & Waigani Centre

Barbara Ruth van den Broek (22 August 1932 – 24 August 2001) was a New Zealand-born Australian architect and landscape architect. She designed the grounds of several Queensland buildings, including the Queensland Cultural Centre and Art Gallery on the South Bank, Brisbane, as well as public parks in Brisbane, and also worked in Papua New Guinea, where she designed the government and parliament buildings.

== Life ==
Van den Broek was born in New Zealand and studied at the University of Auckland, completing a diploma in architecture in 1956. She subsequently moved to Brisbane and set up a joint architecture practice with her husband. In 1963 she won a competition for the design of an area of the grounds of the University of Queensland. She continued to study while working in her practice, completing two qualifications at the Queensland Institute of Technology: a post graduate diploma in town planning in 1966 (her thesis topic was the relationships between open space and urban development) and a postgraduate diploma in landscape design in 1969 (her thesis was on the native plants of Brisbane).

Van den Broek served on a number of professional associations. In 1965 she was a founding member of the Queensland Institute of Landscape Architects and later served as secretary and president. She was a member of council of the Australian Institute of Landscape Architects from 1975 to 1979, and in 1976 she joined the National Trust of Queensland and was the first Chair of the Trust's Landscape sub-committee.

In the 1970s she continued to design landmarks in Queensland and also worked in Papua New Guinea where she designed the Waigani Centre for government administration and parliament. In 1980 she completed a master's degree at Griffith University; her masters dissertation topic was her land use plan for Waigani. In the early 1980s van den Broek moved to Melbourne and while working there joined the landscape committee of the National Trust in Victoria. She then moved to Sydney to become a landscape architect with Blacktown Council and continued to work for the National Trust in New South Wales. In 1997 she received a Voluntary Service Silver Medallion from the Trust in recognition of her years of service. The same year, she presented a co-authored report to the National Trust surveying children's playgrounds in Sydney.
