= James Garrow =

New Zealand law teacher, university administrator (1865–1935)

James Mitchell Ellis Garrow
- Born: October 20, 1865; Banff, Banffshire, Scotland
- Died: October 7, 1935
- Occupations: Teacher, industrial advocate, university registrar, lawyer, professor
- Known for: Legal education and university administration in New Zealand

James Mitchell Ellis Garrow (20 October 1865 – 7 October 1935) was a New Zealand teacher, industrial advocate, university registrar, lawyer and university professor. He was born in Banff, Banffshire, Scotland, on 20 October 1865.
