= Henry Stronach =

New Zealand cricketer

Personal information
- Full name: Henry Donald Stronach
- Born: 27 January 1865; Deepdell Station, Macraes Flat, Otago, New Zealand
- Died: 12 April 1932 (aged 67); Dunedin, Otago, New Zealand
- Role: Batsman

Domestic team information
- Years: Team
- 1892/93–1894/95: Otago
- Source: CricInfo, 25 May 2016

Henry Donald Stronach (27 January 1865 – 12 April 1932) was a New Zealand cricketer. He played six first-class matches for Otago between the 1892–93 and 1894–95 seasons.

Stronach was born at Deepdell Station in North Otago but grew up in Dunedin and attended Otago Boys' High School in the city. His father, Donald Stronach, was a manager for the New Zealand Loan and Mercantile Agency Company in Dunedin. A keen sportsman, he played rugby union for Pirates FC and cricket for Carisbrook Cricket Club in the city and was the first batsman to score a century on the Carisbrook ground.

After leaving school, Stronach worked in the insurance industry, first for South British Insurance before resigning in 1894 to move to become the New Zealand manager for the Straits Insurance Company. After working for a variety of companies within the sector, he finished his career as the manager for Otago and Southland for Commercial Union Assurance.

Four of Stronach's six first-class cricket matches were played during the 1892–93 season. He made his Otago representative debut against Hawke's Bay in December 1892, opening the batting and scoring seven runs in his only innings as Otago won by an innings. After playing in all of Otago's other first-class matches during the season, he appeared against Hawke's Bay again the following season before making his final first-class appearance against Fiji in February 1895. In his six matches he scored a total of 31 runs, with a highest score of 10. In December 1895 he umpired a first-class match between Otago and New South Wales at Carisbrook.

Stronach died at Dunedin in April 1932 after a short illness. He was aged 67.
