= Jim Cowcher =

Australian rules footballer

Personal information
- Full name: James Joseph Cowcher
- Born: 22 December 1874; Napier, New Zealand
- Died: 13 June 1935 (aged 60); Heidelberg, Victoria
- Original team: Kew Juniors

Playing career^{1}
Years	Club	Games (Goals)
1898	Carlton	5 (0)
- ^{1} Playing statistics correct to the end of 1898.

James Joseph Cowcher (22 December 1874 – 13 June 1935) was an Australian rules footballer who played with Carlton in the Victorian Football League (VFL). He previously played for Collingwood in the Victorian Football Association.
