= Ian Kerr (field hockey) =

New Zealand field hockey player

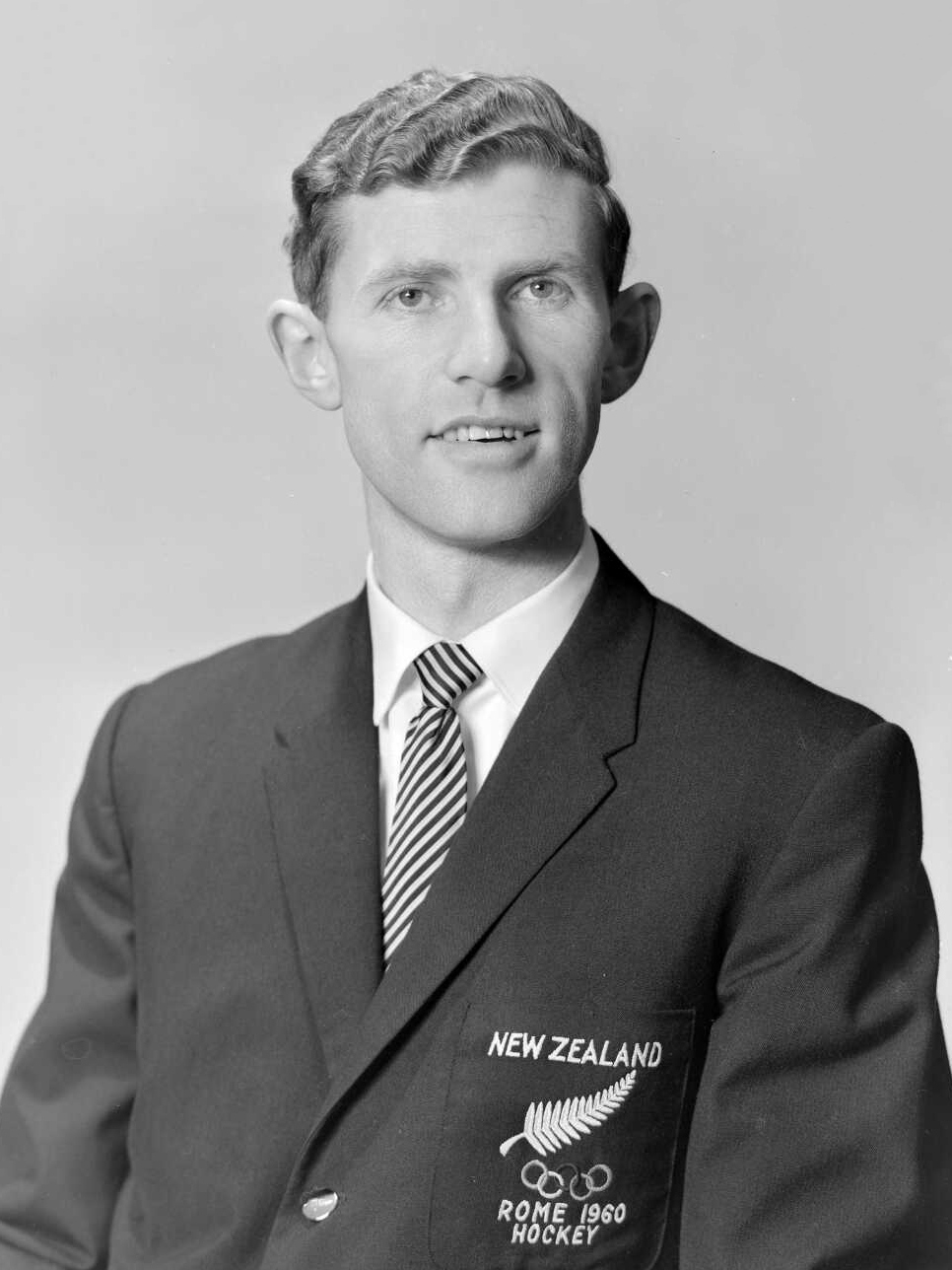
- Kerr in 1964

Personal information
- Born: 10 February 1935 (age 91) Kilbirnie, New Zealand
- Height: 183 cm (6 ft 0 in)
- Weight: 70 kg (154 lb)

Sport
- Sport: Field hockey

Ian John Kerr (born 10 February 1935) is a New Zealand retired field hockey player. He competed at the 1960 and 1964 Summer Olympics and finished fifth in 1960.
