= Charles Thorn (trade unionist) =

Carpenter, undertaker, trade unionist

Charles John Thorn (14 July 1847 – 10 March 1935) was a notable New Zealand carpenter, undertaker and trade unionist. He was born in Leigh, Essex, England, in 1847.
