= Jimmy O'Dea (activist) =

New Zealand trade unionist and activist (1935–2021)

- Born: James O'Dea; 19 October 1935; Newcastle West, County Limerick, Ireland
- Died: 27 November 2021 (aged 86)
- Occupation: Trade unionist

James O'Dea (19 October 1935 – 27 November 2021) was a New Zealand trade unionist and activist.

== Biography ==
O'Dea was born in Newcastle West, County Limerick, Ireland, on 19 October 1935 to an unwed mother, and placed in a Catholic orphanage. His mother later reclaimed him from the orphanage and brought him up on her own. When he was 17 years old, O'Dea moved to England to work. He subsequently moved to Australia, working in the mining industry around Alice Springs and witnessing discrimination against Aboriginal Australians.

O'Dea settled in New Zealand in 1956, and worked on the construction of the Meremere Power Station, where he became active in trade unions. In 1958, he married Katherine Cummings, and the couple went on to have three children. After divorcing in the 1970s, he remarried in the 1980s and had two more sons.

After Māori psychiatrist Henry Bennett was refused service in the lounge bar of the Papakura Hotel in 1959, O'Dea became involved in anti-racism and Māori land rights activities. He participated in the 1975 land march as a volunteer bus driver, resigning from his job to do so, and went on to take part in other significant land protests including the occupations of the Raglan Golf Course and Bastion Point in the 1970s, and at Ihumātao in the late 2010s.

O'Dea took part in protests against the 1981 Springbok tour, suffering a beating by police officers near Eden Park on the day of the final match of the tour. He was involved in on-the-water protests against visiting American warships in the 1970s and 1980s, campaigned for a united Ireland, and resisted the removal and redevelopment of state houses in the Auckland suburb of Glen Innes in 2012. A member of the Communist Party and a life-long unionist, O'Dea believed that class-based politics were the only means of achieving freedom and justice for working people. John Minto has described O'Dea as a "genuine champion of the working class".

O'Dea died in hospital in Auckland on 27 November 2021, aged 86.
