= Magic Playgrounds in New Zealand's Geyserland =

1935 New Zealand promotional documentary film

- Production company: New Zealand Government Tourist Office
- Release date: 1935
- Running time: 11 minutes
- Country: New Zealand
- Language: English

Magic Playgrounds in New Zealand's Geyserland is a 1935 New Zealand promotional documentary film.

== Synopsis ==
This documentary shows the following tourist attractions around Rotorua - Blue Baths, golf course, mud pools, Maori village, Waikite Geyser, Maori carvings, crafts such as weaving, St Faith's Church Ohinemutu, memorial to Queen Victoria at Ohinemutu, water skiing on Lake Rotoiti, trout fishing in lake and stream, Lake Tarawera, Mount Tarawera and Lake Rotomahana with its steaming cliffs.

== Production ==
This film was produced for the New Zealand Government Tourist Office.

== Reviews ==
- 1935 Southland Times - "The Magic Playgrounds" has pride of place in the programme of "Shorts" at the Regent.
