= Howard Williams (ceramicist) =

New Zealand ceramicist

Howard Williams (born 1935) is a New Zealand ceramicist and art writer.

In 1971 Williams founded the Karanga Ceramic Studio at Silverdale in Auckland. He is a member of the New Zealand Society of Potters Inc and current chair of the Albany Village Charitable Arts Trust.

Williams is the editor of the New Zealand Pottery Workbook, a practical guide for pottery making . He is the editor of Then and Now: NZ Potters Miscellany 1963-2009 and New Zealand Potter.
