= Alfred Cousins =

New Zealand engraver and stamp designer

Alfred Ernest Cousins (24 October 1852 – 25 June 1935) was a New Zealand engraver and stamp designer. He was born in St Helier, Channel Islands, on 24 October 1852.

His firm Bock and Cousins published The Art Album of New Zealand Flora by Sarah Featon and her husband, Edward Featon.
