= John Mallard (cricketer) =

New Zealand cricketer and insurance executive

Personal information
- Full name: John James Jaffray Mallard
- Born: 18 December 1860; Melbourne, Colony of Victoria, Australia
- Died: 26 March 1935 (aged 74); Dunedin, Otago, New Zealand

Domestic team information
- Years: Team
- 1882/83–1884/85: Otago
- Source: ESPNcricinfo, 15 May 2016

John James Jaffray Mallard (18 December 1860 – 26 March 1935) was a New Zealand sportsman and insurance executive. He played two first-class cricket matches for Otago, one in each of the 1882–83 and 1884–85 seasons, and represented the province in rugby union.

Mallard was born in Melbourne and moved with his family to Dunedin in 1864. After attending Otago Boys' High School he began working for the Victoria Insurance Company. He joined the National Insurance Company of New Zealand in 1888 and remained with the company until he retired in 1926. He was secretary of the company from 1914 to 1919, and general manager from 1919 until his retirement. He was an authority on the history of Dunedin and the Otago region, and had been president of the Otago Early Settlers' Association for five years at the time of his death in 1935.

Mallard married Marjory May Murray Wallace in Dunedin in September 1889. They had a daughter and two sons, one of whom died in action in World War I. Marjory died in December 1917; Mallard died in Dunedin in March 1935, aged 74.
