= Manu Maniapoto =

New Zealand rugby union player

- Born: Manukapua Maniapoto; 29 June 1935 Mokai, Taupō District, New Zealand
- Died: 24 January 2017 (aged 81) Rotorua, New Zealand
- Height: 1.95 m (6 ft 5 in)
- Weight: 107 kg (236 lb)
- Notable relative: Moana Maniapoto (niece)
- Occupation: Bushman

Rugby union career
- Position: Lock
Provincial / State sides
Years	Team	Apps	(Points)
1960–68	Bay of Plenty	107	(32)
International career
Years	Team	Apps	(Points)
1960–66	New Zealand Māori		

Manukapua "Manu" Maniapoto (29 June 1935 – 24 January 2017) was a New Zealand rugby union player. A lock, Maniapoto represented Bay of Plenty at a provincial level, playing 107 times for the province between 1960 and 1968, scoring 10 tries and kicking one conversion. He was the first player to reach 100 games for Bay of Plenty. Of Ngāti Tūwharetoa, Ngāti Pikiao and Tuhourangi descent, Maniapoto was a member of the New Zealand Māori side from 1960 to 1966, and played for both Tai Rāwhiti (1963–1965) and Northern (1967) in the Prince of Wales Cup.

Born at Mokai, north of Taupō, on 29 June 1935, Maniapoto was the fourth son of Hema Maniapoto and Mamaeroa Maniapoto (née Hamiora), and the uncle of singer Moana Maniapoto. He died in Rotorua on 24 January 2017, and his tangihanga was held at Waitetoko Marae at Te Rangiita, on the shores of Lake Taupō.
