= Mark Irwin (poet) =

American poet

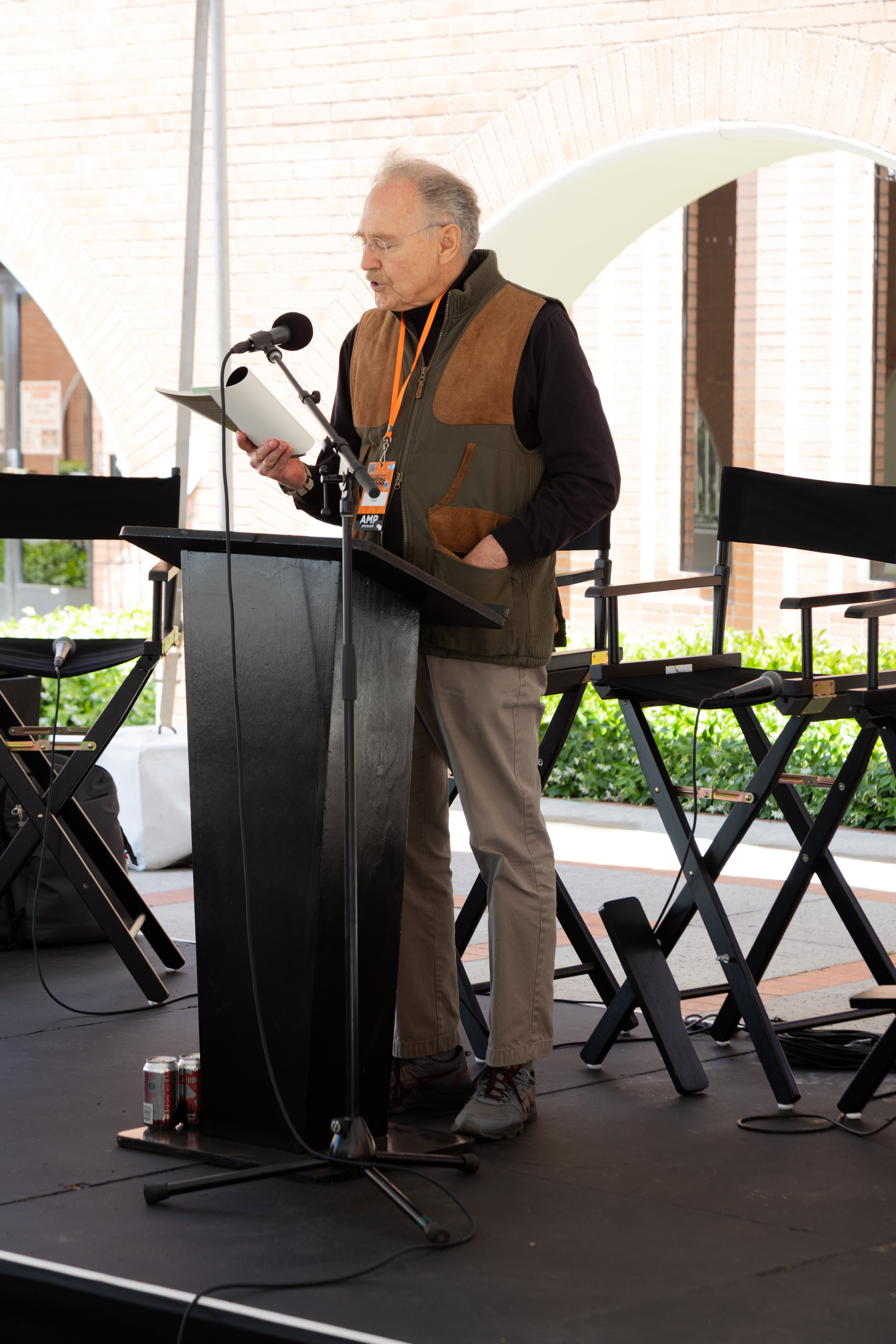
Irwin reading in 2025

Mark Irwin (born 1952) is an American poet and the author of twelve collections of poetry, most recently Once When Green (University of Massachusetts Press). He lives in Los Angeles and the mountains of rural Colorado. His honors and awards include the Juniper Prize for Poetry, the Philip Levine Prize for Poetry, the Test Site Poetry Prize, the Nation/Discovery Award, four Pushcart Prizes, a National Endowment for the Arts Poetry Fellowship, Colorado and Ohio Art Council Fellowships, two Colorado Book Awards, the James Wright Poetry Award, and fellowships from the Fulbright, Lilly, and Wurlitzer Foundations.

== Career ==
Irwin attended the Iowa Writers' Workshop (MFA, 1980) and Case Western Reserve University (PhD, 1982). Currently, he is a professor in the PhD in Creative Writing & Literature Program at the University of Southern California, and he has also taught as a Visiting Writer at the University of Colorado/Boulder, Ohio University, University of Denver, University of Nevada/Las Vegas, Ashland University MFA Program, The Colorado College, and the Paris American Academy/USC. Additionally, he has served as Guest Editor for the literary journals Pequod and The Denver Quarterly.

== Publications ==
His poetry and essays have appeared in many literary magazines including The American Poetry Review, Agni Review, The Atlantic Monthly, Conjunctions, Georgia Review, Harper’s, The Kenyon Review, Paris Review, Pleiades, Poetry, The Nation, New England Review, New American Writing, The New Republic, The New York Times, The Southern Review, and Tin House. He has also translated Philippe Denis’ Notebook of Shadows, Nichita Stănescu’s Ask the Circle to Forgive You: Selected Poems, and Zanzibar: Selected Poems and Letters of Arthur Rimbaud (forthcoming with Alain Borer). His collection of essays, Monster: Distortion, Abstraction, and Originality in Contemporary American Poetry, was published in 2017. His poetry has also been set to music and translated into several languages.

=== Full-Length Poetry Collections ===
- Once When Green (University of Massachusetts Press, 2025)
- Joyful Orphan (University of Nevada Press, 2023)
- Shimmer (Anhinga Press, 2020)
- A Passion According to Green (New Issues Press, 2017)
- American Urn: New & Selected Poems (Ashland University Poetry Press, 2015)
- Large White House Speaking (New Issues Press, 2013)
- Tall If (New Issues Press, 2008)
- Bright Hunger (BOA Editions, 2004)
- White City (BOA Editions, 2000)
- Quick, Now, Always (BOA Editions, 1990)
- Against the Meanwhile (Wesleyan University Press 1989)
- The Halo of Desire (The Galileo Press, 1987)
