= Donald MacLeod (New Zealand cricketer) =

New Zealand cricketer

Personal information
- Full name: Donald Norman MacLeod
- Born: 17 November 1932; Wellington, New Zealand
- Died: 29 May 2008 (aged 75); Auckland, New Zealand
- Batting: Right-handed

Career statistics
Competition	First-class
Matches	34
Runs scored	1,539
Batting average	26.53
100s/50s	3/8
Top score	135
Balls bowled	20
Wickets	0
Bowling average	–
5 wickets in innings	–
10 wickets in match	–
Best bowling	–
Catches/stumpings	16/–
- Source: ESPNcricinfo, 17 November 2024

Donald Norman MacLeod (17 November 1932 – 29 May 2008) was a New Zealand cricketer. He played first-class cricket for Canterbury, Central Districts and Wellington between 1956 and 1968.

An right-handed batsman who often opened the innings, MacLeod scored a century on his first-class debut in December 1956 for Central Districts against Wellington, when he made 117: "while he was at the wicket the crowd were entertained by some glorious strokes, and late in his innings, some confident but heart-stopping short runs". He made his highest score in 1957–58, when he made 135 for Central Districts against Auckland. He also played Hawke Cup cricket for five North Island teams between 1957 and 1975.
