= John Hooker (novelist) =

New Zealand-born Australian writer

John Williamson Hooker (3 April 1932 – 29 April 2008) was a New Zealand-born Australian novelist.

== Life and work ==
John Hooker was born in Auckland, where he received an MA from the University of Auckland. He spent some time in the US before moving to Australia in 1963, working as publishing director at Penguin Australia and Collins. He turned to full-time writing in 1985.

His novels display a gift for "dramatic action, landscape description and psychological insight". AustLit notes that they also focus on "such themes as murder, violence, corruption, racism and love". The most popular are The Bush Soldiers (1984) and Standing Orders (1986). The Bush Soldiers imagines what might have happened if Japanese forces had invaded Australia during the Second World War. Standing Orders is set during the Korean War.

Hooker suffered from multiple sclerosis from his fifties and in later years used a wheelchair. He and his second wife, Rae, moved to Port Fairy on Victoria's west coast, where he wrote a weekly column, "The Hooker Line", for the local newspaper The Warrnambool Standard. He died in Melbourne from pneumonia, aged 76, survived by Rae and Jake - his son.

== Books ==
=== Novels ===
- Jacob's Season (1971)
- The Bush Soldiers (1984)
- Standing Orders (1986)
- Captain James Cook (1987, based on a screenplay by Peter Yeldham)
- Rubicon (1990)
- Our Jack (1995)
- Beyond the Pale (1998)

=== Non-fiction ===
- Brekky, Dinner & Tea: Recipes for When You're Hungry (1985, with John Michie)
- Korea: The Forgotten War (1989)
