= Sidney Williamson =

New Zealand singer, conductor and singing teacher

Sidney Williamson (c. 1870 – 7 October 1935) was a notable New Zealand singer, conductor and singing teacher. He was born in London, England. in about 1870.
