= Adrian Langerwerf =

Dutch missionary (1876–1935)

Adrian Cornelius Langerwerf (born Adrianus Cornelis Langerwerf; 15 September 1876 – 7 April 1935) was a Dutch Catholic missionary and writer. He was born in Waspik, Netherlands, the son of Cornelis Bartels Langerwerf (1835–1881) and Lucia Smeur (1845–1890), on 15 September 1876. He was a missionary in New Zealand.
