= William Ferguson (engineer) =

Civil Engineering Manager and Consultant in New Zealand

William Ferguson (15 June 1852 – 20 June 1935) was a New Zealand civil engineering manager and consultant. He was born in London, England, on 15 June 1852.
