= William Stevenson (New Zealand politician, born 1864) =

New Zealand politician

William Stevenson (1864 – 5 October 1935) was a member of the New Zealand Legislative Council from 11 June 1930 to 5 October 1935, when he died. He was appointed by the United/Reform Coalition Government.

He was born in Dunedin in 1864. His father, John Stevenson, was managing the Henley Estate on the Taieri Plains. He attended Taieri Ferry School, Oamaru Grammar School, Dunedin Normal School, and Otago Boys' High School. He moved south with his parents and became a boundary rider at age 13; by age 18, he was a station manager. He later lived in Invercargill. In 1935, he was awarded the King George V Silver Jubilee Medal.
