= Robert Long (New Zealand cricketer) =

New Zealand cricketer

Personal information
- Full name: Robert Inder Long
- Born: 13 April 1932; Ranfurly, New Zealand
- Died: 11 February 2010 (aged 77); Auckland, New Zealand
- Batting: Right-handed
- Bowling: Right-arm medium

Domestic team information
- Years: Team
- 1953/54–1965/66: Otago
- 1960/61–1963/64: Central Otago
- Source: ESPNcricinfo, 15 May 2016

Robert Long (13 April 1932 – 11 February 2010) was a New Zealand cricketer. He played 15 first-class matches for Otago between the 1953–54 season and 1963–64.

Long was born at Ranfurly in Central Otago in 1932 and was educated at Otago Boys' High School in Dunedin. He played for Otago age-group sides as early as the 1949–50 season and made his representative debut in a February 1954 first-class match against the touring Fiji national cricket team at Carisbrook. He made his Plunket Shield debut in December 1960 and played in a total of 15 first-class matches for the provincial side, appearing in each season between 1960–61 and 1963–64. He scored a total of 567 runs and took seven first-class wickets.

As well as playing for Otago, Long played in the Hawke Cup for Central Otago. He worked as an accountant. He died at Auckland in 2010 at the age of 77.
