= Mervyn Sandri =

New Zealand cricketer

Personal information
- Full name: Mervyn Francis Sandri
- Born: 20 January 1932; Roxburgh, Central Otago, New Zealand
- Died: 16 January 2016 (aged 83); Oamaru, North Otago, New Zealand
- Batting: Right-handed
- Bowling: Right-arm medium-fast

Domestic team information
- Years: Team
- 1956/57: Otago
- 1958/59–1972/73: North Otago
- Source: CricInfo, 23 May 2016

Mervyn Francis Sandri (20 January 1932 – 16 January 2016) was a New Zealand cricketer. He played one first-class match for Otago during the 1956–57 season.

Sandri was born at Roxburgh in Central Otago in 1932. He played club cricket for Albion in Oamaru for many years and was regarded as a "very effective" bowler. He took nine wickets in an innings for the club as late as the 1963–64, bolding his medium-pace deliveries "accurately" and taking the catch to dismiss the other batsman during the innings, and was described as a "long-standing" member of the North Otago team, playing Hawke Cup cricket for it between 1958–59 and 1972–73.

After playing for North Otago and age-group cricket for Otago, Sandri played his only first-class match for Otago against the touring Australian Test side in February 1957. Opening the bowling, he did not take a wicket, although he made scores of 25 and two in Otago's innings defeat.

Sandri died at Oamaru in 2016. He was aged 83.
