= Mark Irwin (rugby union) =

New Zealand rugby union player (1935–2018)

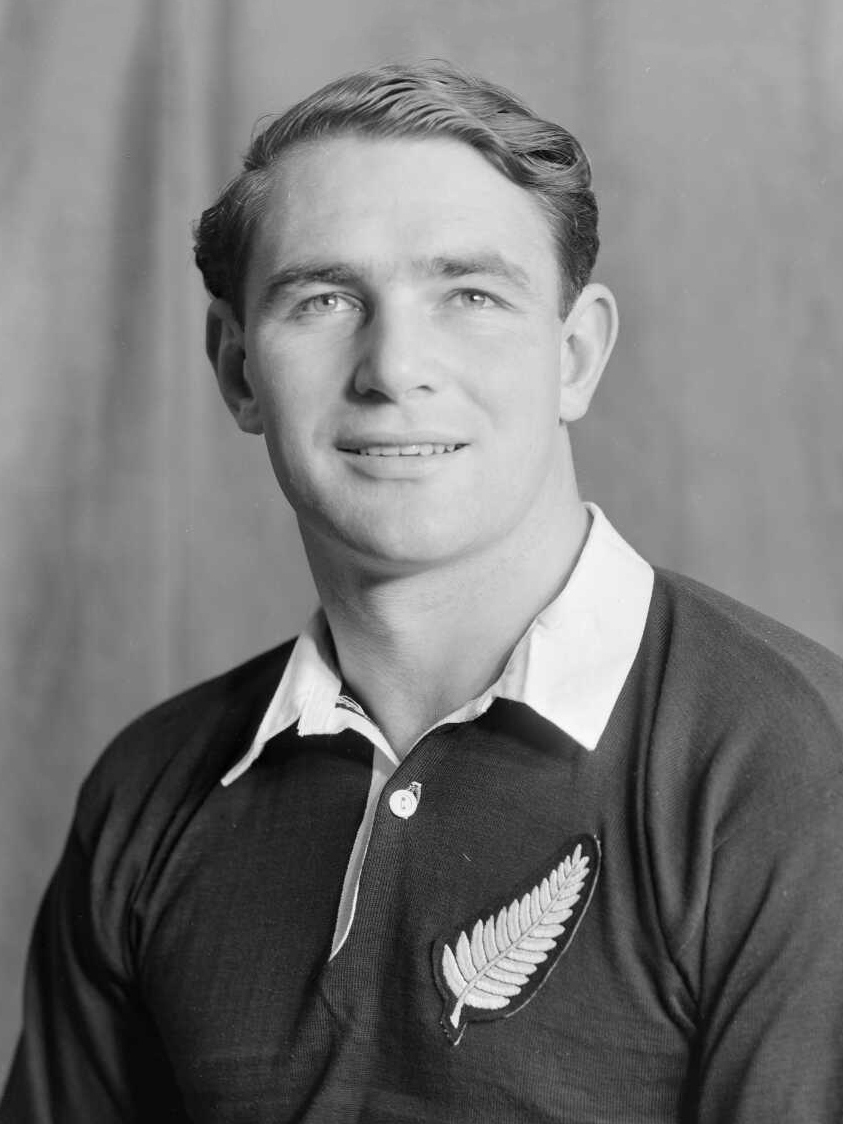
- Irwin c. 1960
- Born: Mark William Irwin; 10 February 1935 Gisborne, New Zealand
- Died: 30 June 2018 (aged 83) Rotorua, New Zealand
- Height: 1.84 m (6 ft 0 in)
- Weight: 103 kg (227 lb)
- School: Wanganui Collegiate School
- University: University of Otago
- Occupation: Doctor

Rugby union career
- Position: Prop
Provincial / State sides
Years	Team	Apps	(Points)
1953–60	Otago	27	
1961	Poverty Bay		
1962	Bay of Plenty		
International career
Years	Team	Apps	(Points)
1955–60	New Zealand	7	(0)

Mark William Irwin (10 February 1935 – 30 June 2018) was a New Zealand rugby union player. A prop, Irwin represented Otago, Poverty Bay, and Bay of Plenty at a provincial level, and was a member of the New Zealand national side, the All Blacks, from 1955 to 1960. He played 25 matches for the All Blacks including seven internationals.

Born in Gisborne, Irwin was educated at Wanganui Collegiate School where he was head boy, and played in the 1st XV rugby team from 1950 to 1952. He went on to study medicine at the University of Otago, graduating MB ChB in 1961. An accomplished rower, Irwin was in the eight nominated to represent New Zealand at the 1956 Summer Olympics in Melbourne; however, the crew did not make final selection.

In his medical career, Irwin worked in Rotorua for over 40 years as a general practitioner and anaesthetist.

Irwin died in Rotorua on 30 June 2018, aged 83.
