= Mary Josepha Nowland =

Mary Josepha Nowland (born Catherine Elizabeth Nowland; 16 June 1863 – 14 December 1935) was a New Zealand Catholic nun and teacher. She was born in Gunnedah, New South Wales, Australia, in 1863.
