= Sarah Featon =

New Zealand botanical artist and author

- Born: Sarah Ann Porter c. 1848
- Died: 28 April 1927; Gisborne, New Zealand
- Known for: botanical illustration
- Notable work: The Art Album of New Zealand Flora
- Spouse: Edward Featon

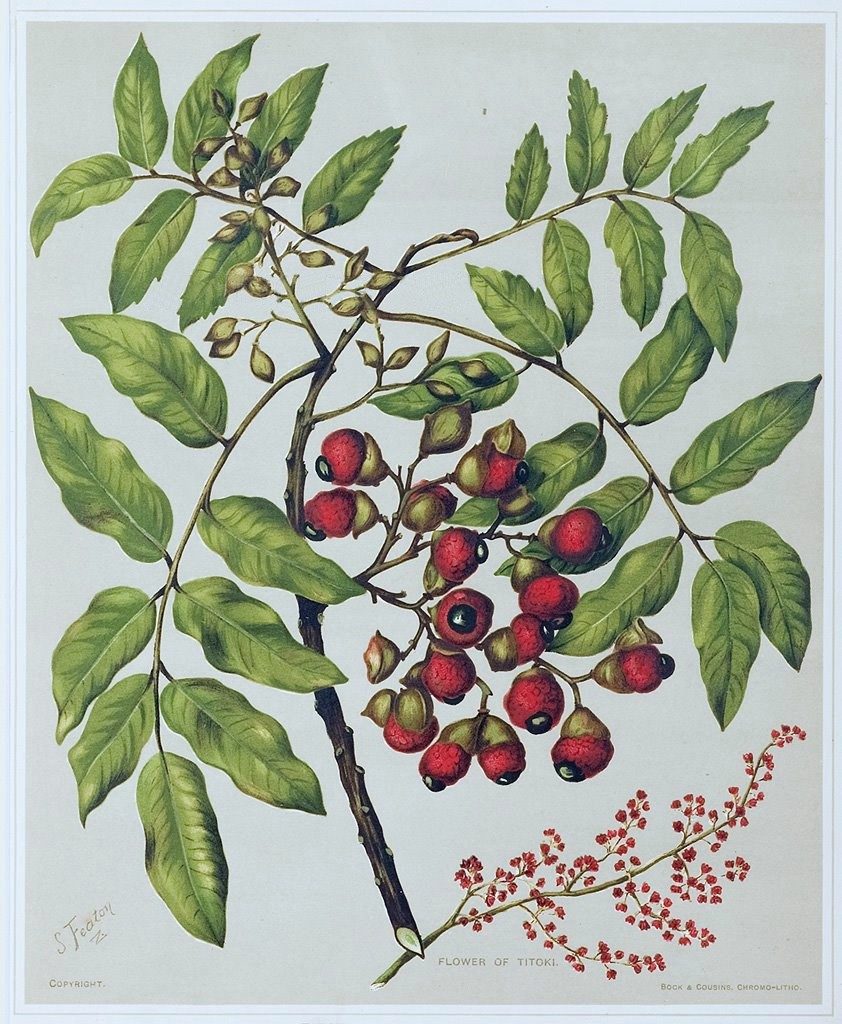
Alectryon excelsus (1889)

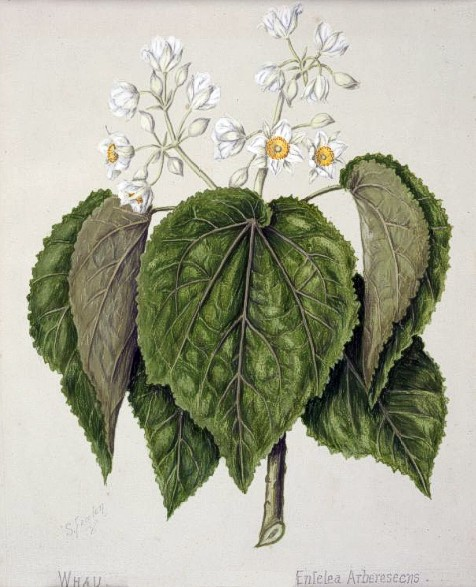
Entelea arborescens

Sarah Ann Featon (née Porter, c. 1848 – 28 April 1927) was a botanical artist from New Zealand.

== Early life ==
There are few records of Featon's early life. She was of English origin, born to Henry William Porter, a "gentleman of independent means", in 1848, probably in London. It is unclear when she arrived in New Zealand but she is recorded as having married Edward Featon at St Paul's, Auckland in 1870. In 1875 Featon and her husband moved to Gisborne, as Edward had been appointed as the area's first District Land Officer.

== Published work ==
During this time Featon and her husband began work on their seminal work The Art Album of New Zealand Flora. Featon painted the watercolours for the plates while her husband wrote the text. The Featons set out to produce their album to debunk the widely held belief that there were no flowers in New Zealand.

The album was the first full-colour art book to be published in New Zealand. It contained systematic and popular descriptions of the native flowering plants of New Zealand and the adjacent islands, and included information about Māori uses of plants, sourced by Edward from his friend William Colenso. Featon created all of the artwork for the book and commissioned the chromolithography for the book plates from the workshop of Bock and Cousins, Wellington. Her treatment of each individual plant exemplified both her botanical expertise and skill as an artist, as she emphasized the plant's aesthetic qualities while clarifying its properties and scientific characteristics. The album was originally published in three parts, the first part being released in November 1887 and the next two in 1888. The three parts were issued as a single volume in 1889. The book was the first with fully-coloured art to be printed in New Zealand.

Despite largely being a product of a European world view, the illustration and text contained within The Art Album of New Zealand demonstrates an awareness of the connection between New Zealand plant life and Māori culture. Featon often placed the te reo Māori title for each plant ahead of the scientific name, with her husband and collaborator including information on the specimen's various uses in te ao Māori.

A copy of the book was presented by the New Zealand Government to Queen Victoria in 1897 on the occasion of her diamond jubilee. That copy is now in the British Museum.

Reverend William Colenso, a prominent early settler and noted expert on botany, and Archdeacon (later Bishop) W. L . Williams were keen supporters of the book and supplied specimens to Featon to paint. Colenso named a newly discovered species, Dracophyllum featonium, in her honour. This species is now regarded as being synonymous with Dracophyllum strictum.

== Later life ==
Featon suffered financial hardship later in life and sold the original artwork for the book to the Dominion Museum – now the Museum of New Zealand Te Papa Tongarewa where they continue to be held. She died in Gisborne on 28 April 1927, and was buried at Makaraka Cemetery. The Featons had two children but only a son (Edwin, known as Teddy) is thought to have survived childhood. He later worked for a Hawke's Bay stock and station firm Williams and Kettle.

In 2017, Featon was selected as one of the Royal Society Te Apārangi's "150 women in 150 words", celebrating the contributions of women to knowledge in New Zealand. In 2021 New Zealand Post released stamps based on her artworks.
