= Frank Wells (cricketer) =

New Zealand cricketer (1871–1932)

Personal information
- Full name: Frank Liddiard Wells
- Born: 21 October 1871; Dunedin, Otago, New Zealand
- Died: 14 January 1932 (aged 60); Wellington, New Zealand

Domestic team information
- Years: Team
- 1895/96–1896/97: Otago
- Source: CricInfo, 27 May 2016

Frank Liddiard Wells (21 October 1871 – 14 January 1932) was a New Zealand cricketer. He played two first-class matches for Otago, one in each of the 1895–96 and 1896–97 seasons.

Wells was born at Dunedin in October 1871. He played club cricket for Opoho Cricket Club in the city before making his first-class debut in a match against a touring New South Wales team at Carisbrook in December 1895. Later in the season he played in the representative match against Southland, a match not considered to have first-class status at this time. During the following season he was in an Otago team of 15 which played the touring Australians in early November before appearing against Canterbury later in the month in his second and final first-class match. As well as being a fine cricketer, Wells played rugby union for the Alhambra club in Dunedin.

Wells worked for Barraud and Abraham Limited, a general merchant company, at Palmerston North and later at Wellington where he was the branch manager. He played club cricket in the capital for Phoenix Cricket Club and played representative cricket for Manawatu. (Note: Some obituary notices state that Wells also played for Wellington and New Zealand.) He acted as Scorer for Wellington Cricket Club until the late 1920s. After a period of illness dating back to 1919, including being bed-ridden for a year, he died at Wellington in 1932. He was aged 60.
