= Golden Bay-Motueka Rugby Union =

Sports governing body in New Zealand

Golden Bay-Motueka

Club information
- Full name: Golden Bay-Motueka Rugby Union
- Colours: White and Brown
- Founded: 1920

Current details
- Ground: Rugby Park, Motueka

The Golden Bay-Motueka Rugby Union was the governing body for rugby union in the Motueka and Golden Bay area, in the northwest of the South Island of New Zealand, between 1920 and 1967.

== History ==
The Golden Bay-Motueka Rugby Union was formed in 1920, following representations by Harry Manoy and Gordon Boundy at the annual meeting of the New Zealand Rugby Football Union in Wellington in May of that year, which saw the area split from the Nelson Rugby Union. Keith Holyoake served as the union's president from 1930 to 1933.

After the 1967 season, Golden Bay-Motueka re-amalgamated with Nelson to form the Nelson Bays Rugby Union.

== Ranfurly Shield ==
In the history of the Golden Bay-Motueka Rugby Union, they contested the Ranfurly Shield once only. They played the holders, Taranaki at New Plymouth in 1958 and were defeated by 56 points to 8.

== McGlashen Cup ==
The McGlashen Cup was contested between the Golden Bay-Motueka and Nelson Rugby Unions.
