= 1931 in New Zealand =

- Decades: 1910s; 1920s; 1930s; 1940s; 1950s
- See also: History of New Zealand; List of years in New Zealand; Timeline of New Zealand history

The following lists events that happened during 1931 in New Zealand.

== Population ==
- Estimated population as of 31 December: 1,522,800.
- Increase since previous 31 December 1930: 16,000 (1.06%).
- Males per 100 females: 103.8.

== Incumbents ==
=== Regal and viceregal ===
- Head of state - George V
- Governor-General - The Lord Bledisloe GCMG KBE PC

=== Government ===
Crowd on intersection of Willis and Mercer Streets, Wellington, outside the offices of the Evening Post, awaiting the results of the 1931 general election.

The 23rd New Zealand Parliament continued with the coalition of the United Party and the Labour Party with the Reform Party in opposition. During the year the agreement between United and Labour collapsed due to differing opinions on how to counter the Great Depression. The Reform Party, fearing that the Depression would give Labour a substantial boost, reluctantly agreed to form a coalition with United to avert elections. By forming a coalition, United and Reform were able to blunt Labour's advantage, ending the possibility of the anti-Labour vote being split and the general election in December saw the United–Reform Coalition winning a majority.

- Speaker of the House - Charles Statham (Independent)
- Prime Minister - George Forbes
- Minister of Finance - George Forbes (United) until 22 September, then William Downie Stewart (Reform)
- Minister of Foreign Affairs - George Forbes
- Attor - Thomas Sidey until 22 September, then William Downie Stewart
- Chief Justice — Sir Michael Myers

=== Parliamentary opposition ===
- Leader of the Opposition - Gordon Coates (Reform) until 22 September, then Harry Holland (Labour).

=== Main centre leaders ===
- Mayor of Auckland - George Baildon, succeeded by George Hutchison
- Mayor of Wellington - George Troup, succeeded by Thomas Hislop
- Mayor of Christchurch - John Archer, succeeded by Dan Sullivan
- Mayor of Dunedin - Robert Black

== Events ==
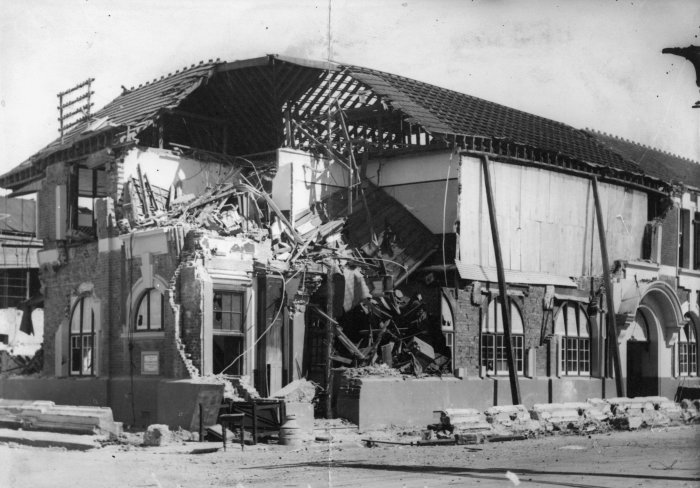
Damage to the Hastings Post Office inflicted by the Hawke's Bay earthquake

- 7 January – Australian aviator Guy Menzies makes the first solo flight across the Tasman sea, starting from Sydney and ending 11 hours 45 minutes later with a crash landing in a swamp near Harihari on the West Coast
- 3 February – The Hawkes Bay earthquake, New Zealand's worst, kills 256 people, mainly in Napier and Hastings
- 8 February – A Desoutter aircraft of Dominion Airline crashed near Wairoa, killing all three people aboard. This is the first fatality on a scheduled air service in New Zealand.
- 27 February – Oscar Garden lands his Gipsy Moth aircraft at Horseshoe Bay on Stewart Island / Rakiura, the first aircraft to land on the island.

== Arts and literature ==
See 1931 in art, 1931 in literature, Category:1931 books

=== Music ===
See: 1931 in music

=== Radio ===
See: Public broadcasting in New Zealand

=== Film ===
See: Category:1931 film awards, 1931 in film, List of New Zealand feature films, Cinema of New Zealand, Category:1931 films

== Sport ==
=== Chess ===
- The 40th National Chess Championship was held in Rotorua, and was won by A.W. Gyles of Wellington.

=== Golf ===
- The 21st New Zealand Open championship was won by Andrew Shaw, his 4th win.
- The 35th National Amateur Championships were held in Christchurch
  - Men: Rana Wagg (Hutt)
  - Women: Miss B. Gaisford

=== Horse racing ===
==== Harness racing ====
- New Zealand Trotting Cup – Harold Logan
- Auckland Trotting Cup – Royal Silk

==== Thoroughbred racing ====
- New Zealand Cup – Spearful
- Avondale Gold Cup – Little Doubt
- Auckland Cup – Admiral Drake
- Wellington Cup – Stanchion
- New Zealand Derby – Bronze Eagle

=== Lawn bowls ===
The national outdoor lawn bowls championships are held in Auckland.

- Men's singles champion – N.C. Bell (Hamilton Bowling Club)
- Men's pair champions – H.G. Loveridge, R.N. Pilkington (skip) (Hamilton Bowling Club)
- Men's fours champions – J.D. Best, A.J.H. Gregory, H. Gardiner, G.A. Deare (skip) (Dunedin Bowling Club)

=== Rugby league ===
New Zealand national rugby league team

=== Rugby Union ===
Category:Rugby union in New Zealand, Category:All Blacks

- Ranfurly Shield

=== Soccer ===
- 1931 Chatham Cup won by Tramurewa (Auckland)
- Provincial league champions:
  - Auckland: Thistle
  - Canterbury: Rangers, Nomads (shared)
  - Hawke's Bay: National Tobacco
  - Nelson: Hospital
  - Otago: HSOB
  - Southland: Rangers
  - Taranaki: Hawera, Albion (shared)
  - Waikato: Rotowaro
  - Wanganui: KP's
  - Wellington: Petone

== Births ==
=== January ===
- 1 January – Inez Kingi, health advocate (died 2022)
- 2 January – Ritchie Johnston, cyclist (died 2001)
- 12 January – Bert Ormond, association footballer (died 2017)
- 14 January – Norm Wilson, cricketer (died 2018)
- 19 January – Pat Hunt, politician (died 2023)
- 20 January – Allan Tong, rower
- 23 January – Gordon McLauchlan, author (died 2020)
- 30 January – Doug Wilson, rugby union player (died 2019)

=== February ===
- 1 February – Nicholas Tarling, historian (died 2017)
- 10 February – Keith Bagley, rugby union player (died 1999)
- 14 February – Peter Wardle, botanist (died 2008)
- 15 February – Lloyd Ashby, rugby union player
- 21 February
  - Warren Dibble, poet, playwright (died 2014)
  - Te Paekiomeka Joy Ruha, Māori leader (died 2011)
- 22 February – Bryce Postles, cricketer (died 2011)

=== March ===
- 4 March – Don Jowett, athlete, rugby union player (died 2011)
- 5 March
  - Ian Clarke, rugby union player (died 1997)
  - Brian Fitzpatrick, rugby union player (died 2006)
- 9 March – Jack Lasenby, children's author (died 2019)
- 10 March – Colin Loader, rugby union player (died 2021)
- 11 March – Colin Jillings, Thoroughbred racehorse trainer (died 2022)
- 19 March – Cliff Skeggs, businessman, politician, mayor of Dunedin
- 31 March
  - Shirley Murray, hymn lyricist (died 2020)
  - Bruce Papas, fashion designer (died 2020)

=== April ===
- 3 April – Elspeth Kennedy, sharebroker, community leader (died 2017)
- 4 April
  - Eric Anderson, rugby union player and coach (died 2014)
  - Catherine Tizard, politician, mayor of Auckland, 16th governor-general (died 2021)
- 6 April – Ian Grey, rugby league player (died 2009)
- 7 April – John McDonald, cricketer
- 9 April
  - Ruth Castle, weaver
  - Patrick Murray, priest, editor, ecumenicist (died 1983)
- 10 April – Neil Waters, chemist, university administrator (died 2018)
- 13 April – Doug Armstrong, cricketer, sports broadcaster, politician (died 2015)
- 14 April – Bruce Pairaudeau, cricketer (died 2022)
- 20 April – Bill Tolhurst, politician (died 2013)
- 23 April – John Williams, cricketer

=== May ===
- 3 May – Malcolm Hahn, javelin thrower (died 2010)
- 12 May – Murray Ashby, rower (died 1990)
- 17 May – Thomas Eichelbaum, jurist (died 2018)
- 20 May – Barry Brown, boxer (died 2004)
- 22 May – Buddy Lucas, swimmer, surf lifesaver (died 2002)
- 23 May – Rex Austin, politician (died 2022)

=== June ===
- 2 June – Joyce Waters, inorganic chemist
- 18 June – Jane Soons, geomorphologist (died 2020)
- 19 June – Heather Nicholson geologist, writer (died 2019)
- 26 June
  - George Martin, rugby league player, field athlete (died 2017)
  - John Scott, medical researcher (died 2015)

=== July ===
- 2 July – Robin Gray, politician (died 2022)
- 6 July – John Spencer, boat designer (died 1996)
- 18 July – Peter Goddard, educationalist (died 2012)
- 21 July – Roy Meehan, wrestler (died 2011)
- 23 July – Te Atairangikaahu, 6th Māori monarch (died 2006)
- 24 July – Ray Laurent, rower (died 2010)
- 25 July – Murray Day, squash administrator (died 2022)
- 26 July – Jean Puketapu, Māori language activist, kōhanga reo pioneer (died 2012)
- 27 July – David Goldsmith, field hockey player (died 2017)
- 28 July – Peter Shirtcliffe, businessman

=== August ===
- 3 August
  - Rod Bieleski, plant physiologist (died 2016)
  - Lee Grant, actress, singer (died 2016)
- 9 August
  - Mike Hinge, artist and illustrator (died 2003)
  - Ernie Leonard, television presenter, wrestling commentator, actor (died 1994)
- 10 August
  - Richard Atkins, diplomat (died 1998)
  - Bruce Slane, public servant, lawyer (died 2017)
- 11 August – Ralph Hotere, artist (died 2013)
- 13 August – Norman Read, racewalker (died 1994)
- 22 August – Maurice Gee, novelist, screenwriter (died 2025)

=== September ===
- 4 September – Bill Skelton, jockey (died 2016)
- 5 September
  - Bill Bell, cricketer (died 2002)
  - Stew Nairn, sports shooter (died 1991)
- 12 September – John Ogilvie, cricketer (died 2021)
- 15 September
  - Brian Henderson, radio and television personality (died 2021)
  - Lincoln Hurring, swimmer and swimming coach (died 1993)
  - Harold Marshall, acoustician (died 2024)
- 28 September – Noel Pope, local-body politician (died 2019)
- 30 September – Geoffrey Chisholm, urologist (died 1994)

=== October ===
- 6 October – Michael Hardie Boys, jurist, 17th governor-general (died 2023)
- 9 October – Mark Otway, tennis player (died 2014)
- 14 October – Colin Dickinson, cyclist (died 2006)
- 16 October
  - Peter Bush, sports photographer (died 2023)
  - Kristin Jacobi, swimmer
  - Ian Quigley, politician (died 2016)
- 17 October – Mazhar Krasniqi, Muslim community leader, human rights activist (died 2019)
- 23 October – James McNeish, novelist, playwright, biographer (died 2016)
- 25 October – Beverley Holloway, entomologist (died 2023)
- 29 October – Murray Loudon, field hockey player, dentist (died 2019)
- 30 October – Alma Johnson, television personality (died 2017)

=== November ===
- 2 November – Steve Kuzmicich, statistician (died 2018)
- 9 November – Eion Scarrow, gardening personality, broadcaster and author (died 2013)
- 12 November – Jeanne Macaskill, artist (died 2014)
- 21 November – Bruce Townshend, politician (died 1987)
- 27 November – Keith Allen, politician (died 1984)
- 30 November – Vivian Lynn, artist (died 2018)

=== December ===
- 8 December – David Crooks, air force officer (died 2022)
- 10 December – John Bond, rugby league player (died 2024)
- 11 December – Bryce Harland, diplomat (died 2006)
- 17 December – Frank Devine, journalist, newspaper editor (died 2009)
- 18 December – Noel McGregor, cricketer (died 2007)

=== Exact date unknown ===
- Nola Barron, potter
- Con Cambie, natural products chemist
- Beverley Randell, children's author

== Deaths ==
=== January–March ===
- 12 January – Peter Cheal, surveyor (born 1846)
- 18 January
  - Daldy MacWilliams, goldminer, businessman, sportsman (born 1860)
  - Owen Merton, painter (born 1887)
- 20 January – Shailer Weston, politician (born 1868)
- 31 January – Job Osborne, farm contractor, well-sinker (born 1842)
- 21 February – Rhona Haszard, artist (born 1901)
- 27 February – Edith Searle Grossmann, novelist, journalist, feminist (born 1863)
- 15 March – William Beattie, photographer (born 1864)

=== April–June ===
- 13 April – Joseph Firth, cricketer, sports administrator, educator (born 1859)
- 18 April – Arthur Hall, politician (born 1880)
- 3 May – Hannah Dudley, Methodist mission sister (born 1864)
- 10 May – Anna Stout, social reformer (born 1858)
- 22 May – Bernard Chambers, viticulturist, winemaker (born 1859)
- 26 May – Richard Barton, pastoralist, author (born 1879)
- 6 June – William Baucke, linguist, ethnologist, journalist (born 1848)
- 10 June – May Moore, photographer (born 1881)

=== July–September ===
- 5 July – Henry Winkelmann, photographer (born 1860)
- 12 July – Noel Brodrick, surveyor (born 1855)
- 1 August – Dick Stewart, rugby union player (born 1871)
- 12 August – Lizzie Rattray, journalist, suffragist (born 1855)
- 28 August – Tene Waitere, carver (born c.1853)
- 9 September – Elsdon Best, ethnographer (born 1856)
- 10 September – Pratt Kempthorne, Anglican clergyman (born 1849)

=== October–December ===
- 6 October – Robert Yates, cricketer (born 1845)
- 24 October
  - Alfred Eckhold, rugby union player, cricketer (born 1885)
  - John Potter, stonemason, builder (born 1834)
- 28 October – Edward Tregear, surveyor, public servant, linguist (born 1846)
- 30 October – Joseph Witheford, politician (born 1848)
- 31 October – Charles Gleeson, cricketer (born 1845)
- 5 November - Jane Stowe, New Zealand artist (born 1838)
- 28 November
  - John Stalker, rugby union player (born 1881)
  - Heathcote Williams, cricket player and administrator (born 1859)
- 7 December – Sir John Luke, politician, mayor of Wellington (born 1858)
- 23 December – Jack Stanaway, rugby league player (born 1873)
- 29 December – William Earnshaw, politician (born 1852)

== See also ==
- List of years in New Zealand
- Timeline of New Zealand history
- History of New Zealand
- Military history of New Zealand
- Timeline of the New Zealand environment
- Timeline of New Zealand's links with Antarctica
