= Eamonn O'Brien =

Eamonn O'Brien may refer to:

- Eamonn O'Brien (Gaelic footballer) (born 1960), with the Meath county team
- Eamonn O'Brien (mathematician), mathematician in New Zealand
