= Eamonn O'Brien (mathematician) =

New Zealand mathematician

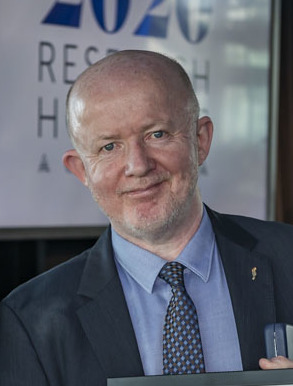
- O'Brien receiving the Hector Medal in 2020
- Born: Eamonn Anthony O'Brien
- Education: Australian National University
- Known for: Computational group theory; Ore conjecture
- Awards: Hector Medal; FRSNZ
- Scientific career
- Fields: Mathematician
- Workplaces: University of Auckland
- Thesis: The Groups of Order Dividing 256 (1988)
- Doctoral advisor: Michael F. Newman

Eamonn Anthony O'Brien FRSNZ is a professor of mathematics at the University of Auckland, New Zealand, known for his work in computational group theory and p-groups.

== Education ==
O'Brien obtained his B.Sc. (Hons) from the National University of Ireland (Galway) in 1983. He completed his Ph.D. in 1988 at the Australian National University. His dissertation, The Groups of Order Dividing 256, was supervised by Michael F. Newman.

== Research ==
O'Brien's early work concerned classification, up to isomorphism, of groups of order 256. He developed early computer software to complete the classification, and to verify that the classification can correct errors in earlier counting. This led to classifications of many further families of small order groups. In 2000, together with Bettina Eick and Hans Ulrich Besche, O'Brien classified all groups of order at most 2000, excluding those of order 1024. The groups of order 1024 were instead enumerated. This classification is known as the Small Groups Library. Later with Michael F. Newman and Michael Vaughan-Lee O'Brien extended the classifications of groups of order $p^6$, $p^7$, and $p^8$. These classifications comprise the tables provided in the computer algebra systems SageMath, GAP, and Magma.

For a 20-year span from the mid-1990s, O'Brien led the so-called Matrix Group Recognition Project whose primary objective is to solve the following problem: given a list of invertible matrices over a finite field, determine the composition series of the group. Implementations of algorithms that realize the goals of this project form the bedrock of matrix group computations in the computer algebra system Magma.

O'Brien's collaborations include resolution of several conjectures include the Ore conjecture, according to which all elements of non-abelian finite simple groups are commutators.

== Awards ==
- 2025 Fellow of the American Mathematical Society
- 2024 Alexander von Humboldt Foundation Research Award
- 2021 New Zealand Mathematical Society Kalman Prize
- 2021 University of Auckland Research Excellence Medal
- 2020 Hector Medal, Royal Society of New Zealand.
- 2009 Fellow of the Royal Society of New Zealand
- 2004 New Zealand Mathematics Research Award
- 1995 Humboldt Fellow

== Selected publications ==
- Holt, Derek F.; Leedham-Green, C. R.; O'Brien, E. A.; Rees, Sarah (1996), "Testing matrix groups for primitivity", Journal of Algebra, 184 (3): 795–817, doi:10.1006/jabr.1996.0285, MR 1407871
- Holt, Derek F.; Leedham-Green, C. R.; O'Brien, E. A.; Rees, Sarah (1996), "Computing matrix group decompositions with respect to a normal subgroup", Journal of Algebra, 184 (3): 818–838, doi:10.1006/jabr.1996.0286, MR 1407872
- Leedham-Green, C. R.; O'Brien, E. A. (1997), "Tensor products are projective geometries", Journal of Algebra, 189 (2): 514–528, doi:10.1006/jabr.1996.6881, MR 1438187
- Leedham-Green, C. R.; O'Brien, E. A. (2002), "Recognising tensor-induced matrix groups", Journal of Algebra, 253 (1): 14–30, doi:10.1016/S0021-8693(02)00041-8, MR 1925006
- Glasby, S. P.; Leedham-Green, C. R.; O'Brien, E. A. (2006), "Writing projective representations over subfields", Journal of Algebra, 295 (1): 51–61, doi:10.1016/j.jalgebra.2005.03.037, MR 2188850
- Liebeck, Martin W.; O'Brien, E. A.; Shalev, Aner; Tiep, Pham Huu (2010), "The Ore conjecture", Journal of the European Mathematical Society, 12 (4): 939–1008, doi:10.4171/JEMS/220, MR 2654085
- Guralnick, Robert M.; Liebeck, Martin W.; O'Brien, E. A.; Shalev, Aner; Tiep, Pham Huu (2018), "Surjective word maps and Burnside's $p^aq^b$ theorem", Inventiones Mathematicae, 213 (2): 589–695, arXiv:1505.00718, doi:10.1007/s00222-018-0795-z, hdl:10044/1/57240, MR 3827208, S2CID 253743316
