= Donald Macleod (physicist) =

New Zealand academic molecular physicist (1887–1972)

- Born: Donald Bannerman Macleod; 21 July 1887; Doyleston, New Zealand
- Died: 8 March 1972 (aged 84); Wellington, New Zealand
- Education: Canterbury University College
- Awards: Hector Medal (1940)
- Scientific career
- Fields: Molecular physics
- Workplaces: Canterbury University College
- Thesis: (1922)

Donald Bannerman Macleod (21 July 1887 – 8 March 1972) was a New Zealand molecular physicist.

== Early life and education ==
Born at Doyleston, near Christchurch, in 1887, Macleod studied at Canterbury University College, graduating with an MA with first-class honours in chemistry in 1910.

== Academic career ==
Following his graduation, Macleod was appointed as a lecturer in physics at Canterbury and worked there until his retirement in 1953 as an associate professor. He had a research collaboration with Professor Coleridge Farr from 1911 to 1936. In 1922 Macleod was awarded a DSc from Canterbury University College.

His work covered the viscosity of sulphur and the internal pressure of liquids.

He was elected a Fellow of the Royal Society of New Zealand in 1935 and in 1940 he was awarded the society's Hector Medal for his work in the field of molecular physics.

== Selected publications ==
- Macleod, Donald Bannerman (1910). "Rate of oxidation of acetaldehyde to acetic acid". Transactions of the New Zealand Institute. 43: 33–52.
- Farr, C. Coleridge; Macleod, D.B. (1910). "Further experiments on the influence of artesian water on the hatching of trout". Transactions of the New Zealand Institute. 43: 55–57.
- Farr, C. Coleridge; Skey, Henry Fawsit; Macleod, Donald Bannerman; Marshall, P. (1916). A magnetic survey of the Dominion of New Zealand and some of the outlying islands for the epoch 30th June, 1903. Wellington: New Zealand Government.
- Macleod, D.B. (1923). "On a relation between the viscosity of a liquid and its coefficient of expansion". Transactions of the Faraday Society. 19: 6–16. doi:10.1039/TF9231900006.
- Macleod, D.B. (1934). "The composition of binary mixtures and their viscosities". Transactions of the Faraday Society. 30: 482–493. doi:10.1039/TF9343000482.
- Macleod, D.B. (1945). "On a direct calculation of the viscosity of a liquid, both under ordinary pressures and high pressures, from the viscosity of its vapour, on the basis of a new equation of state". Transactions of the Faraday Society. 41: 771–777. doi:10.1039/TF9454100771.
- Macleod, D.B. (1947). "The calculations of the latent heat of vaporisation and the viscosity of CO_{2} under pressure on the basis of a revised equation of state". Transactions of the Faraday Society. 43: 169–172. doi:10.1039/TF9474300169.
