= H. B. Richenda Parham =

- Born: Helena Beatrice Richenda Saunders; 18 November 1862; Camberwell, Surrey, England
- Died: 18 December 1947 (aged 85); Suva, Colony of Fiji
- Other names: H. B. R. Parham, H. B. R. Saunders, Richenda Parham, Chenda Saunders
- Occupations: Journalist, writer, mine owner, plantation owner, amateur botanist
- Years active: 1891–1947

Helena Beatrice Richenda Parham (née Saunders, 18 November 1862 – 18 December 1947) was a British writer, mine owner, plantation owner and amateur botanist. She grew up in England and began publishing in 1885, when a visit to an aunt in Madeira inspired an interest in cultures and flora and fauna from other places. Before she married in 1896, she published a travel book, several novels, and founded a magazine. On her way to a journalism assignment in the Cape Colony, she met Charles John Parham, whom she would marry. The couple had five children, who were born in various colonies that would later become South Africa. In 1907, the family relocated to Hokitika, New Zealand, where Parham raised her family, gardened, and engaged in mining. When she and Charles were sued by another mining company, they won the case, but paying the expenses to defend themselves depleted their assets. They decided to establish a coconut plantation in Fiji and moved there in 1921.

From 1922, Parham became an avid collector of indigenous plant species. She sent over a thousand specimens to British and U.S. botanical museums. She wrote numerous articles on plants and Fijian culture, which her daughters published, using a multigraph printing machine from their remote plantation on Nasau, on Rukuruku Bay in the Bua Province on Vanua Levu. After her husband's death in 1926, Parham continued to try to make a living at the plantation, but finally relocated to Suva in 1932. The ribbon root, taeniophyllum parhamiae, which she discovered in 1938, was named in her honour. As of 1994, her best known work, Fiji Native Plants with Their Medicinal and Other Uses (1943), according to Richard Conrad Cambie and Julian Ash remained "the most comprehensive account" of Fijian medicinal plants.

== Early life ==
Helena Beatrice Richenda Saunders (Note: Richenda's obituary in The Journal of the Polynesian Society erroneously gives her maiden name as Taylor. Her birth, baptism, and marriage records all confirm that Taylor was her father's middle name and the family surname was Saunders.) was born on 18 November 1862 in Camberwell, Surrey, England to Mary Caroline (née Lindon) and Richard Taylor Saunders. Both of her parents had been born in Plymouth, Devon. Her mother was the daughter of Susan Hayne (née White) and Joseph Lindon, who was a merchant in Plymouth. Her father was engaged with the Australasian Pacific Mail Steam Packet Company for many years before opening his own firm as a wholesale tea supplier in 1862.

== Career ==
=== Early literary and journalistic efforts (1885–1896) ===
Saunders travelled to the island of Madeira in Portugal to visit an aunt in 1885. She published a book, Contents of a Madeira Mail-Bag under the pseudonym "Ultra Marine" about her trip. It was written as a series of letters to her mother describing her travels and her awakening interest in cultures and flora and fauna that were foreign to England. In the early 1890s, Saunders began publishing stories with J. W. Arrowsmith Ltd, under the pen name Haine Whyte. One of her first books was Where Was the Sin, published in 1891. The story was an argument in favour of allowing divorce without having to commit adultery. According to the review in the Bristol Mercury the book was written by an amateur and riddled with misspellings and "polyglot jargon", but the text showed "a profound knowledge of Latin declensions". The following year, she produce a novel, In Part to Blame, which was about a young heiress who was tricked into marrying a man who turned out to be a bigamist and murderer. The review in the Leeds Times said the characters were interesting, but the plot was problematic. The reviewer for The Glasgow Herald agreed and elaborated, saying that the story would have been "capital" had the main plot not been abandoned after chapter two and another heroine introduced. The reviewer suggested that the first part of the book and the last part of the book would have benefitted from a "connecting chapter" which "gather[ed] up the threads". Pearla, or, "In His Name", and Other Tales, published in 1893, contained three "devotional" short stories: "Pearla", "The Lady of the Light", and "A Norwegian Christmas Box". She then founded a magazine, Ideas, in 1895, which was published from Fleet Street, in London. The magazine published poems and moralistic articles on topics like temperance.

=== Marriage and family life (1896–1920) ===
In 1896, Saunders accepted a position to work as a journalist in the Cape Colony, now South Africa. On her way there, she met a fellow British traveller, Charles John Parham, who was living in Bulawayo, a town established two years earlier by Cecil Rhodes' British South Africa Company. Charles was an electrical engineer and miner, who had been born in Canada and worked in Arizona, California, Mexico and Jamaica, before coming to Africa. The couple married on 24 June 1896 at Bloemfontein in the Orange Free State at St Andrew's Cathedral. The couple's oldest son, Charles Richard Harris Parham, known as Charlie, was born in the Colony of Natal in 1898. After his birth, the family moved to King Williams Town in the Cape Colony (now Qonce, South Africa), where a second son, Wilfrid Laurier, called Laurier, was born in 1900. The three youngest children – Bayard, Beatrice, and Helena – were born before the family moved to New Zealand in 1907. They established a home in Hokitika, in the Westland District. Parham raised the children at home, and when they were old enough, the boys were sent to school in Christchurch. She continued to write, gardened, and worked as a secretary to various mining companies in the area. In 1915, she published a botanical book, illustrated by Beatrice and Helena, with the title of Fernleaves.

Charles initially worked as an engineering consultant to various hydraulic mining operators in the Westland District. He filed his own mining claim for 500 acres of land near Stafford in 1910. Parham also filed various mining claims, including a permit to pan at the spoils of Rimu Flat in 1915, a claim for dredging 100 acres at Sandy Gully at Rimu Flat in 1916, and an alluvial claim on 45 acres on Pine Creek in 1917. In 1916, the couple was sued by the Hohonu Diamond Terrace Gold Mining Company, but they prevailed in both cases heard by the King's Bench Division in London. According to author Phyllis Reeve, in spite of winning the case, after paying the expenses of the suits, their company had no operating funds and Charles went to Christchurch to find work as an engineer. He was only offered temporary positions and began to contemplate moving from New Zealand to Samoa or Fiji. Laurier passed his matriculation examination and Charlie enlisted in the New Zealand Expeditionary Force in 1917, and was sent with his unit to England to assist the British forces. (Note: It is unclear what happened to Charlie during the war. His great-niece Phyllis Reeve stated that he did not see battle, but instead spent his war years in various English military hospitals being treated for gastric ulcers, influenza, and malaria. Charlie's obituary stated that he was gassed and injured during the war, and during that time had malaria.) Thinking that Charlie might receive a land grant because of his war service, Charles wrote to Dyson Blair, the Commissioner of Lands in Fiji. Blair informed him that they did not grant land to returned soldiers and that the majority of the land in Fiji was only available for leasehold tenancy, but that copra production could be lucrative if one was willing to work hard and wait ten years for the coconut trees to produce. Parham sought other alternatives and wrote letters to family England. Their advice was that the economy was in decline and the Parhams should not return. Despite the discouraging reply from Blair, the couple therefore decided to move to Fiji when they could gather the funds to do so.

=== Naturalist and writer (1921–1942) ===
The family moved to Fiji in 1921 to establish a coconut plantation, although they had not yet sold their property in Hokitika. Their leasehold property was located on Vanua Levu, in the Bua Province on Rukuruku Bay at Nasau. Laurier and Bayard worked at beekeeping, building, hunting, and planting. Charlie was still too weak from his illness to be of help when he joined the family and Charles' health was declining. Nonetheless, there were plenty of local foods, such as bananas, coconuts, lemons, Malay apples, mangoes, oranges, pigs, and seafood to feed them, but European ingredients had to be purchased from Suva and their financial position was unstable because their tenants in New Zealand turned-over frequently. Within a year of their arrival, Parham had begun to collect and document botanical specimens, which she sent to Harvard University and London's Kew Gardens and Natural History Museum. She also privately printed from the plantation books like Under Serene Skies, Neta the Pigling: A Crazy Ballad and The Love Sonnets of Senora Carilla das Flores. Lacking access to conventional publishing houses from their remote location, Beatrice and Helena used a duplicating machine to print the pages of their mother's work and bound them at the plantation. The machine was a multigraph printing press, made in Cleveland, Ohio, which Charles bought in Sydney in 1923.

Charles' health continued to decline and from 1923, he fell seriously ill with a heart condition and was unable to work on the plantation. He died in 1926, and Parham continued with the plantation venture with the help of the children. She opened a little store which she operated. She also began publishing her botanical studies in 1928 with a booklet she printed at the plantation, Some Medicinal Plants of Vanua Levu. The plantation venture ultimately failed and Parham moved to Suva in 1932. She published other works such as Names of a Few Fijian Plants and Their Botanical Equivalents (1935) and "Valuable Plants of Fiji: Useful as Perfumery and Drugs" (1937) with publishing houses and in journals. She was a founding member of the Fiji Society of Science and Industry, which was organised in 1938. That year she collected three specimens of ribbon root from her home garden on Pender Street in Suva. These samples were confirmed in 1939 by Louis Otho Williams to belong to the Orchidaceae family. The Polynesian Society published a series of articles "Memoir No. 16: Fiji Plants, Their Names and Uses" in nine installments with two supplements and updates between September 1939 and June 1943. These memoirs were collected and published in book form by The Polynesian Society in 1943 and gave local and botanical names, as well as descriptions and uses for around 1,200 plants. In addition to her botanical writing, Parham contributed articles on culture and history, as well as poetry to The Girl's Own Paper, the Fiji Times and Pacific Islands Monthly.

== Death and legacy ==
Parham died on 18 December 1947 in Suva. (Note: The article in the Pacific Islands Monthly gives the death date as 17 December 1947.) Her interest in the indigenous plant-life of Fiji inspired generations of her family. Her three youngest children, Bayard, Beatrice, and Helena were all known for their published studies of plants. Her son Laurier made a career with the Colonial Service's Agriculture Department, and her grandson, John Willoughby Parham was the senior government botanist of Fiji for many years before becoming the first curator of the Tasmanian Herbarium, in Hobart, Australia. The garden Parham planted in Hokitika existed until the 1980s, and the Fijian ribbon root she discovered in 1938 was named taeniophyllum parhamiae in honour of her and her daughters in 1939.

Phyllis Reeve, granddaughter of Parham, microfilmed the 44 pamphlets, poetry, and notes printed on the multigraph and donated the film to the Pacific Manuscripts Bureau at the Australian National University in Canberra. These are available for reference under collection PMB Doc.398. Although reviews of her fictional and literary works were often critical, her books created with the multigraph printing press were considered to be collectibles because of their unique creation. The Evening Star article about the process proclaimed in 1929 that the qualities of the books, including the "blurred effect of the type" made them unusual, appealing to book lovers and "showed the possibilities of amateur book production". Parham donated many of her papers, particularly those on Fijian culture and plants to the Alexander Turnbull Library in Wellington, New Zealand. Clyde Romer Hughes Taylor, the chief librarian there and a specialist of writings on people of the Pacific, said in Parham's obituary that her cultural writings would make a "useful volume" if an editor were to compile them. Her plant specimens were collected on Vanua Levu in the areas around Rukuruku Bay from 1922 to 1932 and from 1932 to 1947 in the southern part of Viti Levu around Sigatoka, in the Nadroga-Navosa Province. During her lifetime, she sent over a thousand specimens to the British Museum of Natural History and Gray's Herbarium at Harvard University. In 1994, Richard Conrad Cambie and Julian Ash stated that Parham's Fiji Native Plants with Their Medicinal and Other Uses (1943) remained "the most comprehensive account" of Fijian medicinal plants, in spite of its errors and incorrect naming of some species.

== Selected works ==
=== Travel and literature ===
- Ultra Marine (1885). Contents of a Madeira Mail-Bag, or, Island Etchings. London, UK: Moran & Co. OCLC 1166322829.
- Whyte, Haine (1891). Where Was the Sin? Or, the Value of Love. Bristol, England: J. W. Arrowsmith Ltd. OCLC 320316903.
- Whyte, Haine (1892). In Part to Blame, A Novel. Bristol, England: J. W. Arrowsmith Ltd. OCLC 504214360.
- Whyte, Haine (1893). Pearla, or, "In His Name", and Other Tales. Bristol, England: J. W. Arrowsmith Ltd. OCLC 504214374.
- Parham, H. B. Richenda (c. 1900). The Call of the Sudan. not given. OCLC 220786225.
- Parham, H. B. Richenda (c. 1923). Under Serene Skies. Ruku Ruku Bay, Fiji: self. OCLC 221086935.
- Parham, H. B. Richenda (c. 1923). Neta the Pigling: A Crazy Ballad. Ruku Ruku Bay, Fiji: self. OCLC 221087099.
- Flores, Carilla das Flores (1929). Parham, H. B. Richenda (ed.). The Love Sonnets of Senora Carilla das Flores. Ruku Ruku Bay, Fiji: self. OCLC 154152116.
- Parham, Richenda (1948). In Yasi Land, or, Where a Small Ketch Goes! (2nd ed.). Suva, Fiji: Methodist Mission Press. OCLC 1029667681. (first edition in 1931)

=== Botanical works ===
- Parham, Richenda Helena Beatrice (1915). Fernleaves. Hokitika, New Zealand: not given. OCLC 429530929.
- Parham, H. B. Richenda (1928). Some Medicinal Plants of Vanua Levu. Ruku Ruku Bay, Fiji: self. OCLC 503850229.
- Parham, H. B. Richenda (1935). Names of a Few Fijian Plants and Their Botanical Equivalents. Suva, Fiji: Methodist Mission Press. OCLC 700896795.
- Parham, H. B. Richenda (25 August 1937). "Valuable Plants of Fiji: Useful as Perfumery and Drugs". Pacific Islands Monthly. VIII (1). Sydney, New South Wales, Australia: Pacific Publications Ltd: 41-42. ISSN 0030-8722 – via Trove.
- Parham, H. B. Richenda (1939–1943). "Memoir No. 16: Fiji Plants, Their Names and Uses". The Journal of the Polynesian Society. 48–52 (various). Wellington, New Zealand: The Polynesian Society: Sept. 1939 Installment 1, Mar. 1940, Installment 2, June 1940, Installment 3, Sept. 1940, Installment 4, Dec. 1940, Installment 5, Mar. 1941, Installment 6, June 1941, Installment 7, Sept. 1941, Installment 8, Dec. 1941, Installment 9, Mar. 1943, Continuation, June 1943, Conclusion. ISSN 0032-4000.
- Parham, H. B. Richenda (July 1941). "Some Rare or Little Known Plants Collected in Fiji". Transactions and Proceedings of the Fiji Society of Science and Industry. 2 (2). Suva, Fiji: Fiji Society of Science and Industry: 68–75. OCLC 947994173.
- Parham, H. B. Richenda (1943). Andersen, Johannes C. (ed.). Fiji Native Plants with Their Medicinal and Other Uses. Wellington, New Zealand: The Polynesian Society. OCLC 503850229.

=== Fijian history ===
- Parham, Richenda (1927). "Running the Home in Fiji". The Girl's Own Paper. 48. London, UK: The Lutterworth Press: 590. OCLC 8183021.
- Parham, H. B. Richenda (1928). Plantation Printer's Pie!: Pot-Pourri of Facts & Food in Fiji, Or, Fare in Fascinating Fiji, Written for the New-comer!. Ruku Ruku Bay, Fiji: self. OCLC 221084743.
- Parham, H. B. Richenda (1928). Lyrics of the Vei Kau: Island Melodies. Ruku Ruku Bay, Fiji: self. OCLC 221085040.
- Parham, H. B. Richenda (1937). Early History of Vanua Levu. Suva, Fiji: self. OCLC 225833083.
- Parham, H. B. Richenda (1937). Tales of a New Plantation: Na cagi levu and Rejeli. Suva, Fiji: self. OCLC 221083872.
- Parham, Mrs. H. B. R. (September 1941). "A Brief Account of a Well-Known Chief, Ra Masima, Tui Bua". Transactions and Proceedings of the Fiji Society of Science and Industry. 2 (2). Suva, Fiji: Fiji Society of Science and Industry: 97–106.
- Parham, Mrs. Helena B. Richenda (1944). Traditions and History of Fiji. Suva, Fiji: not given.
- Parham, Mrs. Helena B. Richenda (1947). Folklore and Witchcraft in Fiji. Suva, Fiji: not given.
