= Peter Goddard =

Peter Goddard may refer to:

- Peter Goddard (educationalist) (1931–2012), New Zealand educationalist and academic
- Peter Goddard (journalist) (1943–2022), Canadian music journalist and critic with the Toronto Star
- Peter Goddard (motorcyclist) (born 1964), Australian Grand Prix motorcycle road racer
- Peter Goddard (physicist) (born 1945), British mathematical physicist
