= Weatherburn =

Weatherburn is a surname. Notable people with the surname include:

- Charles Ernest Weatherburn (1884–1974), Australian-born mathematician
- David Weatherburn (fl. 1968), chemistry academic
- Don Weatherburn (born 1951), Australian criminologist
