= Hector Medal =

Annual New Zealand science award

The Hector Medal, formerly known as the Hector Memorial Medal, is a science award given by the Royal Society Te Apārangi in memory of Sir James Hector to researchers working in New Zealand. It is awarded annually in rotation for different sciences – currently there are three: chemical sciences; physical sciences; mathematical and information sciences. It is given to a researcher who "has undertaken work of great scientific or technological merit and has made an outstanding contribution to the advancement of the particular branch of science." It was previously rotated through more fields of science – in 1918 they were: botany, chemistry, ethnology, geology, physics (including mathematics and astronomy), zoology (including animal physiology). For a few years it was awarded biennially – it was not awarded in 2000, 2002 or 2004.

In 1991 it was overtaken by the Rutherford Medal as the highest award given by the Royal Society of New Zealand.

The obverse of the medal bears the head of James Hector and the reverse a Māori snaring a huia. The last confirmed sighting of a living huia predates the award of the medal by three years.

== Recipients ==
Year	Recipient	Field
1912	Leonard Cockayne	Botany
1913	Thomas Easterfield	Chemistry
1914	Elsdon Best	Ethnology
1915	Patrick Marshall	Geology
1916	Ernest Rutherford	Physics
1917	Charles Chilton	Zoology
1918	Thomas Cheeseman	Botany
1919	Philip Robertson	Chemistry
1920	Percy Smith	Ethnology
1921	Robert Speight	Geology
1922	Coleridge Farr	Physics
1923	George Hudson	Zoology
1924	Donald Petrie	Botany
1925	Bernard Aston	Chemistry
1926	Harry Skinner	Ethnology
1927	Charles Cotton	Geology
1928	Duncan Sommerville	Mathematics
1929	George Thomson	Zoology
1930	John Holloway	Botany
1931	William Percival Evans	Chemistry
1932	Peter Buck (Te Rangi Hīroa)	Ethnology
1933	John Marwick, Noel Benson	Geology
1934	Charles Ernest Weatherburn	Mathematics
1935	William Benham	Zoology
1936	Walter Oliver	Botany
1937	John Reader Hosking	Chemistry
1938	Herbert Williams	Ethnology
1939	Arthur Bartrum	Geology
1940	Donald Macleod	Physics
1941	Harold Finlay	Zoology
1942	Harry Allan	Botany
1943	Bob Briggs	Chemistry
1944	Johannes Carl Andersen	Ethnology
1945	John Henderson	Geology
1946	Henry Forder	Mathematics
1947	Baden Powell	Zoology
1948	G. H. Cunningham	Botany
1949	Robert Anthony Robinson	Chemistry
1950	Ernest Beaglehole	Ethnology
1951	Francis John Turner	Geology
1952	Keith Bullen	Geophysics
1953	Lance Richdale	Zoology
1954	Lucy Cranwell	Botany
1955	Brian Shorland	Chemistry
1956	Roger Duff	Ethnology
1957	Harold Wellman	Geology
1958	Alister McLellan	Mathematics
1959	Barry Fell	Zoology
1960	Ted Chamberlain	Botany
1961	Harry Bloom	Chemistry
1962	Ralph Piddington	Ethnology
1963	Charles Fleming	Geology
1964	Derek Lawden	Mathematics
1965	Richard Dell	Zoology
1966	Jack Holloway	Botany
1967	Con Cambie	Chemistry
1968	Gilbert Archey	Ethnology
1969	Doug Coombs	Geology
1970	Brian Wybourne	Physics
1971	Ira Cunningham	Zoology
1972	Ted Bollard	Botany
1973	Michael Hartshorn	Chemistry
1974	Herbert Purves	Medicine
1975	Robert Hayes	Geology
1976	Jack Dodd	Physics
1977	Cam Reid	Zoology
1978	Richard Matthews	Botany
1979	Leon Phillips	Chemistry
1980	Graham Liggins	Medicine
1981	Trevor Hatherton	Geology
1982	Roy Kerr	Mathematics
1983	Ray Forster	Zoology
1984	Rod Bieleski	Botany
1985	Peter de la Mare	Chemistry
1986	Robin Carrell	Medicine
1987	Jim Ellis	Chemistry
1988	Dan Walls	Physics
1989	Patricia Bergquist	Zoology
1990	Peter Wardle	Botany
1991	Warren Roper	Chemistry
1992	Roger Green	Ethnology
1993	Dick Walcott	Geology
1994	Geoff Stedman	Physics
1995	Bob Jolly	Zoology
1996	John C. Butcher	Mathematics
1997	Ted Baker	Chemistry
1998	Paul Callaghan, Jeff Tallon	Physics
1999	George Seber	Statistics
2000	No award	
2001	Peter Schwerdtfeger	Chemistry
2002	No award	
2003	Ken MacKenzie	Materials science
2004	No award	
2005	Ian Witten	Computer science
2006	Richard Furneaux	Chemistry
2007	Timothy Haskell	Physics
2008	Gaven Martin	Mathematics
2009	Peter Steel	Chemistry
2010	Grant Williams	Physics
2011	Rod Downey	Mathematics
2012	Margaret Brimble	Chemistry
2013	Richard Blaikie	Physics
2014	Marston Conder	Mathematics
2015	Ian Brown	Chemistry
2016	Stéphane Coen	Physics
2017	Sally Brooker	Chemistry
2018	Matt Visser	Mathematical physics
2019	Jadranka Travaš-Sejdić	Polymers and nanomaterials
2020	Eamonn O’Brien	Mathematical theory of groups
2021	Eric Le Ru	Chemical physics
2022	Murray Cox	Population genetic theory
2023	Niels Kjærgaard	Physics
2024	Charles Semple	Mathematics
2025	Christian Hartinger	Biological chemistry
2026	A. Rod Gover	Mathematics

== See also ==
- Category:New Zealand scientists
- The Shorland Medal given by the New Zealand Association of Scientists
- List of chemistry awards
- List of mathematics awards
- List of physics awards
