= Warren Roper (chemist) =

New Zealand chemist

Warren Richard Roper FRS FRSNZ FNZIC (born 1938) is a New Zealand chemist and Emeritus Professor at the University of Auckland.

Roper was educated at Nelson College from 1952 to 1956, and was dux in his final year. He then studied chemistry at the University of Canterbury, and undertook his PhD under the supervision of CJ Wilkins. He completed his PhD in 1963, and spent three years undertaking postdoctoral research at the University of North Carolina in the United States before returning to New Zealand. At that point Roper was appointed as lecturer at the University of Auckland, where he remained until his retirement (apart from visiting lectureships at other institutions). He mentored several notable students, including Anthony Hill and Penelope Brothers.

== Scholarship ==
Roper's research has focused on synthetic and structural organometallic chemistry, and particularly compounds with metal-carbon, -silicon, -tin or -boron bonds. As his postdoctoral research group had an interest in Vaska's complex, Roper too developed a program on M-PPh_{3}-CO complexes of the platinum metals. A recurring themes of the work was the reactivity of coordinated ligands, especially simple ligands. These ligands included dichlorocarbene, carbonyl sulfide, carbonyl selenide, and carbonyl telluride, and PH_{2}. Prior to his work, metal carbene complexes were restricted to early metals. Roper greatly expanded the scope of carbene ligands with his preparation of Os(CH_{2})(NO)(Cl)(PPh_{3})_{2}.

== Recognition ==
He was made a fellow of the Royal Society of New Zealand (RSNZ) in 1984, and a fellow of the Royal Society in 1989. The RSNZ awarded Roper the Hector Memorial Medal in 1991. He gave a valedictory address at the 2006 New Zealand Institute of Chemistry Conference in honour of his retirement.

== Selected publications ==
- Irvine, Geoffrey J., MJ Gerald Lesley, Todd B. Marder, Nicholas C. Norman, Craig R. Rice, Edward G. Robins, Warren R. Roper, George R. Whittell, and L. James Wright. "Transition metal− boryl compounds: synthesis, reactivity, and structure." Chemical reviews 98, no. 8 (1998): 2685–2722.
- Gallop, Mark A., and Warren R. Roper. "Carbene and carbyne complexes of ruthenium, osmium, and iridium." Adv. Organomet. Chem 25 (1986): 121–198.
- Brothers, Penelope J., and Warren R. Roper. "Transition-metal dihalocarbene complexes." Chemical Reviews 88, no. 7 (1988): 1293–1326.
