= Bob Jolly =

New Zealand veterinary pathologist (1930–2026)

Bob Jolly MNZM
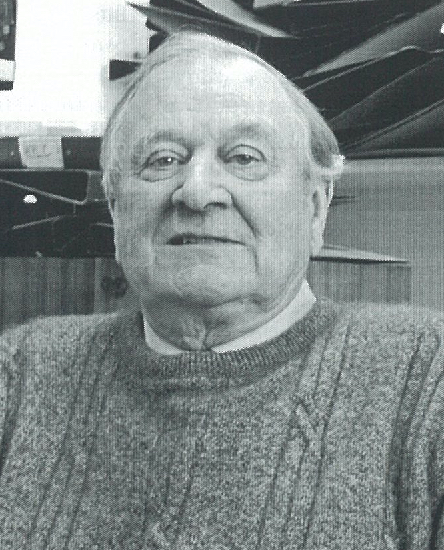
- Born: Robert Dudley Jolly; 1 October 1930; Hamilton, New Zealand
- Died: 18 June 2026 (aged 95); Palmerston North, New Zealand
- Education: University of Sydney
- Spouse: Aline Edwards (m. 1958; died 2018)
- Awards: Hector Medal (1995)
- Scientific career
- Fields: Veterinary pathology
- Workplaces: Massey University
- Thesis: The pathogenesis and immunology of corynebacterium ovis infection of sheep (1964)

Robert Dudley Jolly MNZM (1 October 1930 – 18 June 2026) was a New Zealand veterinary academic specialising in animal pathology. He spent his academic career at Massey University, where much of his research was into animal models of human disease, including Batten's Disease and mannosidosis.

== Life and career ==
Born in Hamilton on 1 October 1930, Jolly was educated at King's College, Auckland, from 1945 to 1948. He studied veterinary science at the University of Sydney, graduating BVSc with second-class honours in January 1955. He then spent five years in veterinary practice in Rotorua, before returning to Sydney for doctoral studies and completing his PhD in 1964. In 1957, Jolly became engaged to Aline Clarissa Edwards, and the couple married in Sydney on 8 April 1958.

Jolly was appointed a senior lecturer at Massey University in 1965, and rose to become a full professor, before retiring in 1995 with the title of emeritus professor.

He was elected a Fellow of the Royal Society of New Zealand in 1985, and in 1995 he won the society's Hector Medal. In the 2005 Queen's Birthday Honours, he was appointed a Member of the New Zealand Order of Merit, for services to veterinary science.

Jolly died in Palmerston North on 18 June 2026, at the age of 95. He had been predeceased by his wife, Aline Jolly, in 2018.
