= Brian Wybourne =

New Zealand physicist (1935–2003)

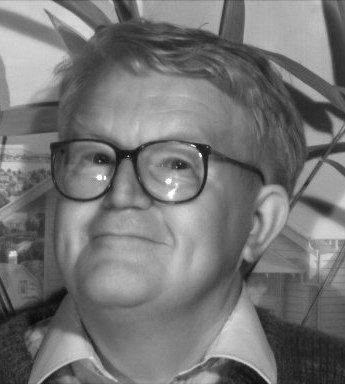
- Born: 5 March 1935; Morrinsville, New Zealand
- Died: 26 November 2003 (aged 68); Toruń, Poland
- Education: Canterbury University College
- Awards: Hector Medal (1970)
- Scientific career
- Fields: Physics
- Workplaces: University of Canterbury; Nicholas Copernicus University
- Thesis: An analysis of the solid state spectra of trivalent rare-earth ions (1960)
- Academic advisors: Alan Runciman
- Doctoral students: Timothy Haskell

Brian Garner Wybourne (5 March 1935 – 26 November 2003) was a New Zealand theoretical physicist known for his groundbreaking work on the energy levels of rare-earth ions and applications of Lie groups to the atomic f shell and by mathematicians for his work on group representation theory.

Born in Morrinsville in 1935, Wybourne attended Canterbury University College, graduating with an MSc with second-class honours in 1958 and a PhD in 1960.

After post-doctoral research positions at Johns Hopkins University and Argonne National Laboratory in the United States, Wybourne returned to the University of Canterbury in 1966 to take up a professorship in physics, at the age of 31. Notable doctoral students of Wybourne at Canterbury include Timothy Haskell.

He was elected a Fellow of the Royal Society of New Zealand in 1970, and the same year he won the society's Hector Medal, the highest award in New Zealand science at that time.

He served as the head of the physics department from December 1982 to November 1989. In 1991 he was a visiting professor at the Nicholas Copernicus University in Toruń, Poland, and decided to remain there permanently.

Wybourne was appointed to a professorship in the Nicholas Copernicus University Institute of Physics in 1993. In 2003 he received an award from the Polish Minister of Education for his outstanding contribution to science. A month later he unexpectedly died of a stroke. In his 13 years in Poland Wybourne published 80 scientific papers.

Wybourne's time in Poland was chronicled in The Polish Odyssey of Brian G. Wybourne, written by his colleague at Nicholas Copernicus University, Jacek Karwowski.
