= Timothy Haskell =

New Zealand scientist

Timothy Haskell NZAM
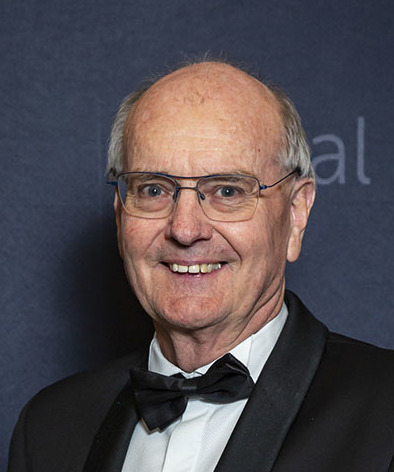
- Haskell in 2019
- Education: BSc University of Canterbury; PhD University of Canterbury
- Scientific career
- Fields: Physics
- Thesis: The group theory of the harmonic oscillator with applications in physics (1972)
- Doctoral advisor: Brian Wybourne

Timothy George Haskell NZAM is a New Zealand scientist.

== Career and impact ==
Haskell completed a PhD at the University of Canterbury in 1972 under the supervision of Brian Wybourne. Haskell started his career at the Physics and Engineering Laboratory of DSIR (New Zealand) and remained with them through its evolution to Industrial Research Limited (IRL). He shifted to Callaghan Innovation in 2012.

He worked with Bill Robinson on the development and installation of earthquake base isolation foundations for Te Papa. However, he is best known for his development of "Camp Haskell" - a containerised facility for working on the Sea ice of McMurdo Sound. He had equipment mounted on the Erebus Glacier Tongue when it calved in 1990. He had just finished a field trip to the glacier in 2010 when it next calved.

He worked with Paul Callaghan for a time, developing portable Nuclear magnetic resonance (NMR) technology. Initial application to the determination of sea ice heterogeneity evolved to become a range of bench-top NMR devices developed by the spin-off company Magritek.

In 2009 the ocean passage between Ross Island and White Island (Ross Archipelago) was named Haskell Strait, Antarctica.

== Awards ==
- 2019 - Thomson Medal from the Royal Society Te Apārangi
- 2008 – New Zealand Antarctic Medal (NZAM) in the 2008 New Year Honours
- 2007 – Royal Society Te Apārangi Hector Medal
- 2006 – New Zealand Association of Scientists Marsden Medal
- 1996 – Royal Society Science and Technology Medal
