= John Reader Hosking =

New Zealand natural products chemist

- Born: 11 July 1896; Dunedin, New Zealand
- Died: 14 October 1946 (aged 50); Hedgerley, Buckinghamshire, England

John Reader Hosking (11 July 1896 – 14 October 1946) was a New Zealand natural products chemist.

== Biography ==
The son of John Henry Hosking, a judge, Hosking was born in Dunedin in 1896. He was part of the 5th (Wellington) Regiment in the Samoan Advance Party at the outbreak of World War I. He rejoined the effort via the Australian forces in Sydney as an Acting Bombardier.

He gained a PhD from Auckland University College, graduating in 1927.

In 1930 Hosking returned to New Zealand from Europe and started working at the Department of Scientific and Industrial Research under Ernest Marsden.

Hosking won the Hector Medal, the highest award of the Royal Society of New Zealand in 1937, the award was forwarded to him in the United Kingdom, where he had returned.

Hosking died on 14 October 1946 at his home in Hedgerley, Buckinghamshire.
