= Robin Carrell =

New Zealand haematologist (born 1936)

- Born: Robin Wayne Carrell; 5 April 1936 (age 90); New Zealand
- Education: University of Otago; University of Canterbury; Lincoln College; University of Cambridge
- Scientific career
- Fields: Haematology
- Thesis: The unstable haemoglobins (1967)
- Doctoral advisor: Hermann Lehmann

Robin Wayne Carrell (born 5 April 1936) is a New Zealand haematologist.

Born in 1936, Carrell was educated at Christchurch Boys' High School from 1949 to 1953. He graduated MB ChB from the University of Otago in 1959, and BSc(Hons) in chemistry and biochemistry from the University of Canterbury and Lincoln College in 1965. He completed his PhD at the University of Cambridge in 1967 and in 1968 he was appointed head of clinical biochemistry at Christchurch Hospital, the department later becoming part of the University of Otago Christchurch School of Medicine. As a spin-off from his research he co-founded biotechnology company Canterbury Scientific in 1985. He returned to Cambridge the following year as professor of haematology, retiring in 2003, but as professor emeritus he has continued his research at Cambridge. He retired from the board of directors of Canterbury Scientific in 2012.

In 1986, he won the Hector Medal, at the time the highest award in New Zealand science. He was elected a Fellow of the Royal Society of New Zealand in 1980, a Fellow of Trinity College, Cambridge in 1987, and a Fellow of the Royal Society in 2002.
