= Leon Phillips (chemist) =

New Zealand physical chemist

- Born: Leon Francis Phillips; 14 July 1935; Thames, New Zealand
- Died: 24 September 2023 (aged 88); Christchurch, New Zealand
- Education: Canterbury University College; University of Cambridge
- Awards: Hector Medal (1979)
- Scientific career
- Fields: Physical chemistry
- Workplaces: University of Canterbury

Leon Francis Phillips (14 July 1935 – 24 September 2023) was a New Zealand physical chemist who specialised in the gas-liquid interface and atmospheric chemistry.

== Biography ==
Born in Thames on 14 July 1935, Phillips was educated at Westport Technical College and Christchurch Boys' High School. He studied at Canterbury University College, from where he graduated with an MSc with first-class honours in 1958. After a PhD at the University of Cambridge and post-doctoral research at McGill University, he returned to lecture at Canterbury, rising to the rank of professor in 1966.

In 1968, Phillips was elected a Fellow of the Royal Society of New Zealand, and in 1979 he won the society's Hector Medal.

In 1959, Phillips married Pamela Anne Johnstone, and the couple went on to have two children. He died in Christchurch on 24 September 2023, at the age of 88.

== Selected works ==
- Phillips, Leon Francis (1967). Electronics for experimenters in chemistry, physics and biology. New York: Wiley.
- Phillips, Leon Francis (1965). Basic quantum chemistry. New York: Wiley.
- McEwan, Murray J.; Phillips, Leon Francis (1975). Chemistry of the atmosphere. London: Wiley. ISBN 0713124776.
