= Bill Denny (medical researcher) =

New Zealand chemist and medical researcher

Sir Bill Denny KNZM
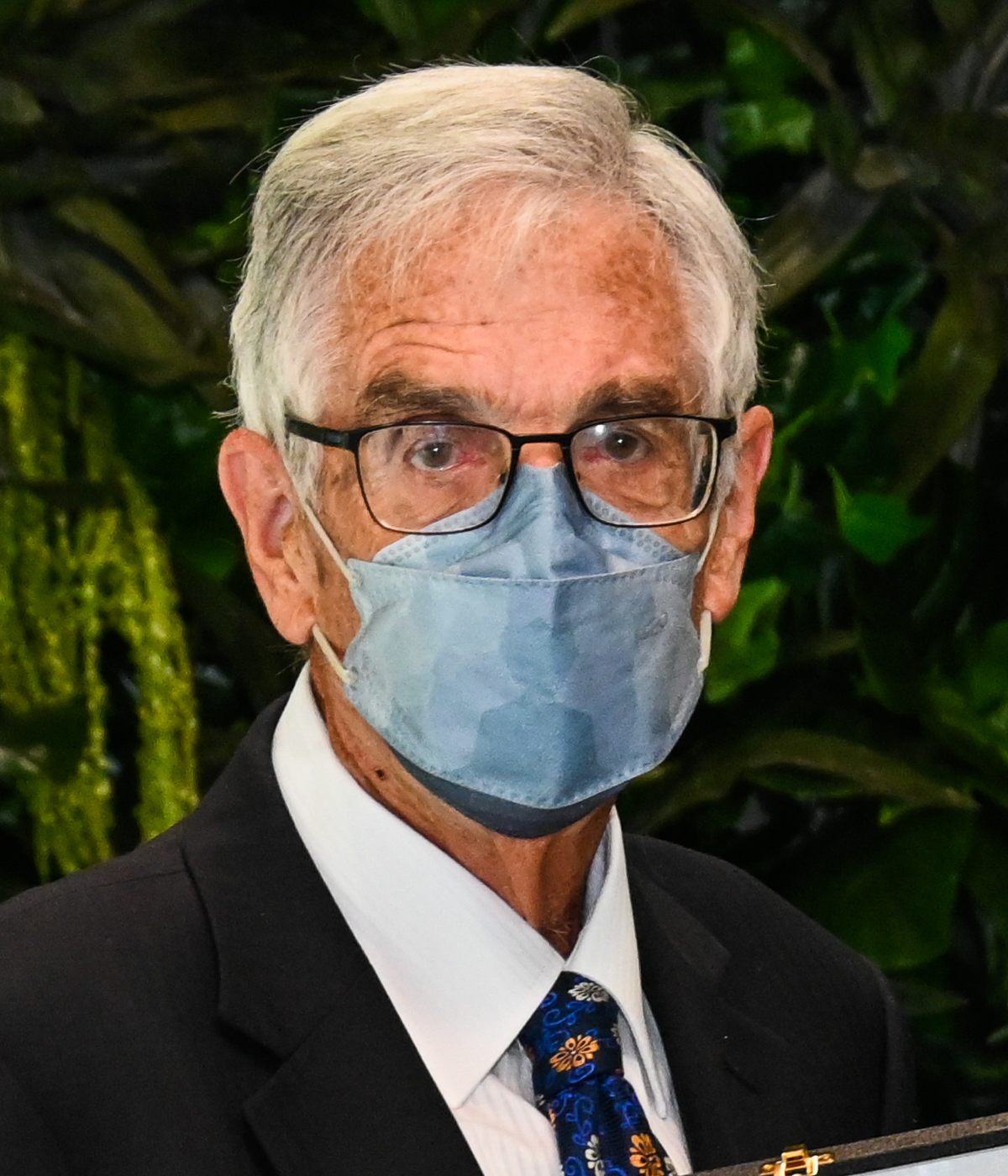
- Denny in 2022
- Born: William Alexander Denny; 5 August 1943 (age 83); Malvern, Worcestershire, England
- Education: University of Auckland
- Awards: Rutherford Medal (1995)
- Scientific career
- Fields: Medicinal chemistry
- Workplaces: University of Auckland
- Thesis: Synthetic studies utilizing podocarpic acid (1969)
- Doctoral advisor: Con Cambie
- Website: University of Auckland profile

Sir William Alexander Denny KNZM (born 5 August 1943) is a New Zealand medicinal chemist, noted for his work investigating drugs for the treatment of cancer.

== Early life and education ==
Denny was born in Malvern, Worcestershire, England, on 5 August 1943. His parents were Norah May (née Vine) and Alexander William Denny. The family emigrated to New Zealand in 1946. He received his education at Patumahoe Primary School and Te Awamutu College where he was dux in 1961. At the University of Auckland, he obtained a Bachelor of Science in 1966, a Master of Science in 1967, a Doctor of Philosophy in 1969, and a Doctor of Science in 1986. He had an ICI (Imperial Chemical Industries) post-doctoral fellowship at Oxford University from 1969 to 1972.

== Career ==
From 1972 to 1979, he was a senior research fellow at the Auckland Cancer Research Laboratory. He was visiting professor at the University of California, San Diego from 1979 to 1981. He then returned to the Cancer Research Laboratory and from 1988, was their director. In 2011 Denny was made a Distinguished Professor at the University of Auckland.

== Honours and awards ==
Denny won a Union for International Cancer Control International Travel Fellowship in 1984. In 1986, he won the ICI New Zealand prize for excellence in research.

Denny was elected a Fellow of the New Zealand Institute of Chemistry in 1981 and a Fellow of the Royal Society of New Zealand in 1988. In 1995, he was awarded the society's Rutherford Medal, alongside the Auckland Cancer Research Laboratory, for innovation in the development of new anti-cancer drugs.

In the 2003 Queen's Birthday Honours, Denny was appointed an Officer of the New Zealand Order of Merit, for services to cancer research. He was promoted to Knight Companion of the New Zealand Order of Merit, for services to medical research, in the 2021 Queen's Birthday Honours.

Denny was inducted into the American Chemical Society Division of Medicinal Chemistry Hall of Fame in 2016.
