= Phyllis Reeve =

Librarian, marina operator, literary critic

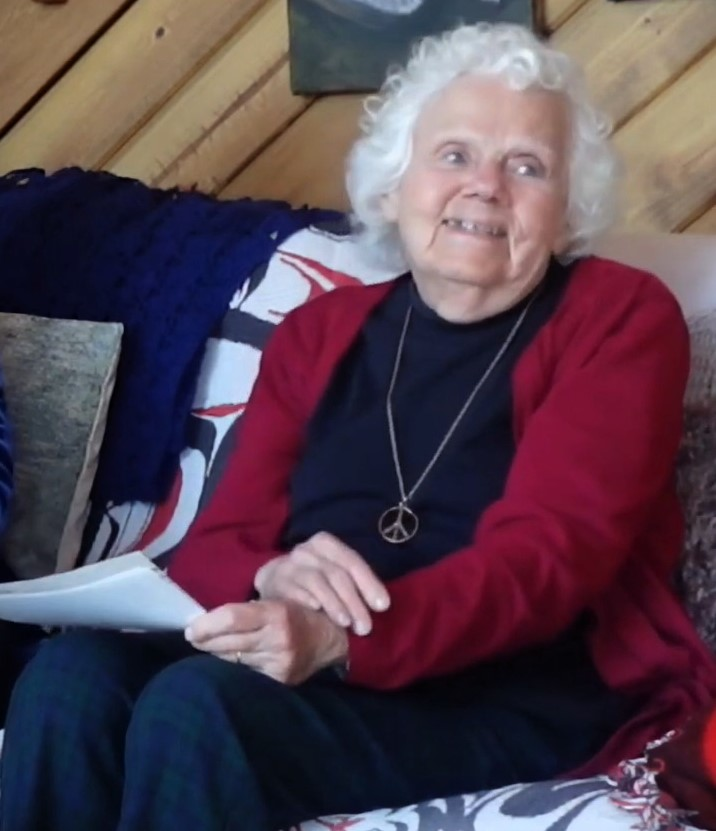
- Phyllis Reeve on "On the Wings of the Doves" by Life on Gabriola TV, 2024
- Born: Phyllis Margery Parham; 1938 (age 87–88); Suva, Colony of Fiji
- Other name: Phyllis Parham Reeve
- Occupations: Librarian, marina owner, writer, and literary critic
- Years active: 1965–present

Phyllis Reeve (born 1938) is a former librarian and marina operator, who has written local histories and serves as a literary critic in British Columbia, Canada. Born in Fiji, she moved to Montreal as a young child and completed her education at the University of British Columbia. She worked in the university library until 1987, when she retired and purchased Page's Resort and Marina on Gabriola Island. She and her husband expanded the business to include an art gallery, book store, and public concert hall, which they operated until retiring in 2007. She has written several local histories, as well as a book drawing on her father's journals about Fiji, and is active as a literary critic.

== Early life and education ==
Phyllis Margery Parham was born in Suva, which at the time was in the British Colony of Fiji, in 1938 to Gladys Margery (née Parham) and Wilfrid Laurier Parham. Her father, known as "Laurier" was born in King Williams Town in the Cape Colony (now Qonce, South Africa) and her mother was born in Franklin Centre, Quebec, Canada. They were second cousins, and first met each other in 1935, when Laurier decided to visit Canada. Two years later, in March 1937, the couple married in Suva. Prior to her marriage Gladys worked as a private nurse for a woman who was an invalid. Laurier worked for the Colonial Service with the Fiji Department of Agriculture. According to Phyllis, the family went to Canada in 1939, to leave her and her mother there for the duration of the war, but the Colonial Service would not allow Laurier to enlist, determining he could better serve the war effort by producing food. The family returned to Fiji, where a son, Lindon, was born in 1941. When Laurier died of complications from appendicitis 1942, Gladys returned to Canada with the two children.

Parham graduated from Chambly County High School in Saint-Lambert with first class honours in 1955. She was awarded a four-year scholarship to attend Bishop's University, and completed her bachelor's degree in 1958. At the end of the year, she married Charles Edward "Ted" Reeve, who would later lead the kidney transplant team for the Province of British Columbia from 1968 to 1987. The couple had five children – Dorothy, Charles, Gloria, Elizabeth, and Henry – over the next decade. In 1963, Reeve was granted a scholarship from the Canada Council to pursue a master's degree. She completed her thesis at the University of British Columbia in 1965, earning an MA in English. She continued her studies, earning a Master of Library Science degree, and was awarded the Neal Harlow Book Prize, as the University of British Columbia's outstanding graduate in the school of librarianship in 1976.

== Career ==
Reeve worked in the acquisitions department of the University of British Columbia Library, until her retirement in 1987. That year, she and Ted purchased Page's Resort and Marina, which had been established by the Page brothers in 1943, on a former Japanese fishing camp site on Gabriola Island. When they acquired the property it offered moorings, camping sites, cabins with kitchens and hearths, a laundry and showers, and a scuba shop which provided basic groceries. It also had the only marine fueling dock in Silva Bay. The Reeves brought with them an extensive library and offered access to it to guests. They commissioned sculptures from local artists, Bob and Dee Lauder, of Fogo Folk Art, who carved "Monique", a life-sized hitchhiker holding a lamp, which adorned the end of the dock, and life-sized self-portraits of Phyllis and Ted, which stood in the library.

As the facility was open year-round, the couple worked seven days a week, but nonetheless, Reeve found time to write. She had earlier published a history of St. James Anglican Church in Vancouver in 1981, which journalist Chuck Davis called "excellent", and The History of the University Women's Club of Vancouver in 1982. She published On Fiji Soil: Memories of an Agriculturalist in 1989, based on her father's journals about Fiji. The book told the story of her father and his family, including his sisters, Beatrice and Helena; brothers, Charlie and Bayard; and his parents, Charles John and Richenda Parham, and their attempts to establish a plantation on the island of Vanua Levu. Reviewer Michael C. Howard, of Simon Fraser University, stated that the book provided insight into the life of "poorer European planters and government officials during the interwar years", and information on important people and events in Fiji of the period. In 1993, she self-published Page's on Silva Bay: Memories of Fifty Years, 1943–1993, which she sold along with the works of other regional writers from the Gulf Islands Book Store the couple had opened at the marina. The book told the story of the resort from its founding in 1943, chronicling the economic recovery of the coast after World War II. Joyce White, who reviewed the book for the Nanaimo Times, said Reeve told the tale of "survival, tragedy, and triumph" with "gentle humor". Historian Charles Lillard said of the book, "A hundred years from now this will be the kind of economic and social history historians will kill for".

In addition to opening the book store, the couple developed Sandstone Studio Gallery in 1990 in the library of their home. The gallery featured art works by local artists and offered public concerts, lectures, and wine and cheese gatherings after events to allow the public to meet the artists. Inspired by a discussion with artist Pnina Granirer, who suggested opening a gallery, her Carved Stones Suite was the first exhibit hosted by the couple in July 1990. Besides multiple exhibits by Granirer, featured artists included Robert Amos and his wife Sarah, Victor Chan, Bill Friesen, Marci Katz, Barbara Klunder, Joyce Marshall, Natasha Rasmussen, and Joe Rosenblatt, along with local artists like Paul Grignon, Elias Wakan and members of the Fogo workshop. In 2007 the Reeves retired from running the operations at the resort, passing them on to their daughter Gloria and her husband, Ken Hatfield. Reeve continued to remain active writing literary reviews for publications like Books in Canada and The British Columbia Review.

== Selected works ==
- Reeve, Phyllis Margery Parham (1965). Mythopoesis of Lawrence Durrell (master's). Vancouver, British Columbia: University of British Columbia. OCLC 606291953. Archived from the original on 18 July 2024.
- Reeve, Phyllis (1981). Every Good Gift: A History of St. James', Vancouver 1881–1981. Vancouver, British Columbia: St. James Anglican Church. OCLC 12034131.
- Reeve, Phyllis (1982). 75th Anniversary, the University Women's Club of Vancouver: The History of the University Women's Club of Vancouver, 1907–1982. Vancouver, British Columbia: University Women's Club of Vancouver. OCLC 13724739.
- Reeve, Phyllis; Dobbin, Geraldine F. (February 1983). "An Automated Processing System for Government Serials". The Serials Librarian. 7 (2). New York, New York: Haworth Press: 41–49. doi:10.1300/J123v07n02_07. ISSN 0361-526X. OCLC 4634628198.
- Reeve, Phyllis (1983). "Binding: From Basement to Boardroom". In Gellatly, Peter (ed.). Beyond 1984: The Future of Library Technical Services. New York, New York: Haworth Press. pp. 203–205. ISBN 978-0-86656-275-1.
- Reeve, Phyllis; Parham, W. L. (1989). On Fiji Soil: Memories of an Agriculturalist. Suva, Fiji: Institute of Pacific Studies, University of the South Pacific. ISBN 978-982-02-0042-5.
- Reeve, Phyllis; Reeve, Ted (1993). Page's on Silva Bay: Memories of Fifty Years, 1943-1993. Gabriola Island, British Columbia: Pages Resort and Marina. OCLC 35879154.
- Reeve, Phyllis, ed. (1996). Malcolm Lowry's "October Ferry": A Gabriola Island Tribute (1st ed.). Victoria, British Columbia: Reference West. ISBN 978-1-895362-51-0.
