= George Seber =

Australian-born New Zealand statistician (born 1938)

- Born: George Arthur Frederick Seber; 6 April 1938 (age 88); Sydney, NSW, Australia
- Education: Auckland University College; University of Manchester
- Awards: Hector Medal (1999)
- Scientific career
- Fields: Statistics, Statistical sampling of biological populations
- Workplaces: University of Auckland; University of Otago
- Website: Official

George Arthur Frederick Seber (born 6 April 1938) is an Australian-born New Zealand statistician. Since his retirement from academic life, he has worked as a counsellor.

== Biography ==
Born in Sydney in 1938, Seber emigrated to New Zealand with his family at the end of World War II. He attended the Auckland University College, graduating with an MSc with first-class honours in 1960, and won a Commonwealth scholarship to undertake PhD in statistics at the University of Manchester. Completing his doctorate in 1963, he took up an assistant lectureship in statistics at the London School of Economics. In 1965 he and the statistician George Jolly simultaneously published accounts of the capture-recapture model of estimating biological population sizes, that came to be called the Jolly-Seber model. The same year, he returned to the University of Auckland, where he worked until retirement, except for a brief stint from 1971 to 1972 as professor of statistics at the University of Otago.

Seber was elected a Fellow of the Royal Society of New Zealand in 1997, and in 1999 he was awarded the society's Hector Medal.

Since formally retiring from academic life, Seber gained a Diploma in Counselling and currently works part-time as a counsellor.

Seber has written several books including Can We Believe It?, Counseling Issues, Coping with Dying, Alcohol: A dangerous love affair, and authored or co-authored 17 mathematical statistics books.

== Selected bibliography ==
- Seber, George (21 March 2016). Can We Believe It? : Evidence for Christianity. Resource Publications. ISBN 978-1498289191.
- Seber, George (2013). Counseling issues : a handbook for counselors and psychotherapists. Self-published. ISBN 9781479757404.
- Seber, George (20 November 2019). Coping with dying : the loss of a loved one. DayStar Books. ISBN 978-0995111776.
- Seber, George (9 December 2019). Alcohol : A dangerous love affair. Self-published. ISBN 9780473503215.
- Seber, George (1973). The Estimation of Animal Abundance and related parameters. Charles Griffin & Company Limited. ISBN 0-85264-207-5.
