= Leonard Soicher =

British-canadian mathematician

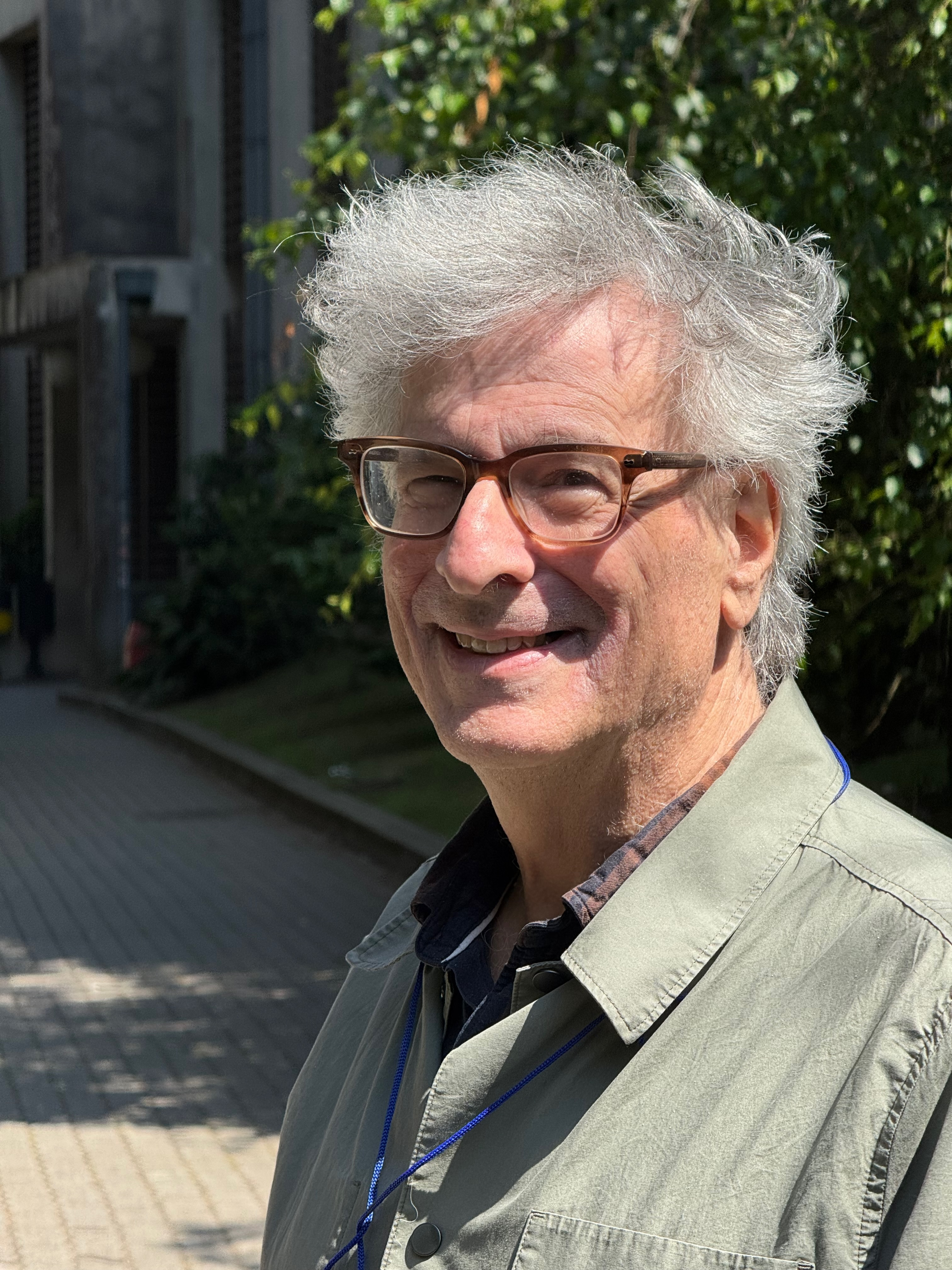
- Soicher in May 2026
- Born: 1955 (age 70–71); Canada
- Education: Concordia University (BSc, MCompSci); University of Cambridge (PhD)
- Scientific career
- Fields: Group theory; Algebraic graph theory; Design theory; Computational mathematics
- Workplaces: Queen Mary University of London
- Doctoral advisor: John H. Conway
- Website: webspace.maths.qmul.ac.uk/l.h.soicher

Leonard Hyman Soicher is a British-Canadian mathematician who worked in algebraic graph theory, group theory, combinatorial design theory, and discrete computational mathematics. He is an Emeritus Professor of Mathematics at Queen Mary University of London.

== Education ==
Soicher earned a BSc in mathematics in 1978 and a Master of Computer Science in 1981, both from Concordia University in Montreal, Canada. His master's thesis, titled “The Computation of Galois groups”, was supervised by John McKay. He won a Commonwealth Scholarship to pursue a doctorate from the University of Cambridge, with John H. Conway as his supervisor. Soicher was awarded his PhD in 1985, with a PhD thesis titled “Presentations of Some Finite Groups” that focused on sporadic simple groups.

== Career ==
Soicher has worked across a range of fields as a professional pure mathematician. After his doctorate, he worked again with John McKay as a postdoc at Concordia University in Canada. He then joined Queen Mary University of London in 1987, where he remained until retirement in 2018, becoming a Professor in 2007.

Soicher is most known for his early work on presentations of sporadic simple groups; his contribution to the ATLAS of Finite Groups; the Bimonster group; work with Charles Leedham-Green developing “collection from the left” and the product replacement algorithm. in computational group theory; his research on distance-regular graphs (especially the three so-called Soicher graphs and the Moscow-Soicher graph); and his long-term and ongoing authorship and development of the GRAPE package for GAP. Soicher is also a co-creator and maintainer of the website designtheory.org.

== GAP ==
Soicher has been a member of the council of the computer algebra system GAP since June 1997, and was its chair from March 2009 until September 2021. He is the author of the GRAPE and DESIGN packages for GAP. A special session in honour of Soicher's 70th birthday was held at the GAP Days Summer 2025 workshop in Koper, Slovenia.

== Selected publications ==
- with John McKay: Computing Galois groups over the rationals, Journal of Number Theory (1985).
- with John H. Conway, Simon P. Norton: The Bimonster, the group Y_{555}, and the projective plane of order 3, Computers in Algebra (1988).
- with Rosemary A. Bailey, Peter J. Cameron, Peter Dobcsányi, John P. Morgan: Designs on the web, Discrete Mathematics (2006).
- with Cheryl E. Praeger: Low rank representations and graphs for sporadic groups, Cambridge University Press (1996).
