= Ted Chamberlain =

New Zealand academic (1906–1993)

- Born: Edward Edinborough Chamberlain; 5 July 1906; Masterton, New Zealand
- Died: 2 April 1993 (aged 86)
- Education: Victoria University College
- Spouse: Geraldine Baylis (m. 1941)
- Awards: Hector Medal (1960)
- Scientific career
- Fields: Plant pathology, plant viruses
- Workplaces: Department of Scientific and Industrial Research

Edward Edinborough Chamberlain (5 July 1906 – 2 April 1993) was a New Zealand plant pathologist.

== Biography ==
Born in Masterton in 1906, Chamberlain completed his MSc at Victoria University College with a thesis entitled An investigation of the nature of p-azophenol, graduating in 1929. He was awarded a DSc by the same institution in 1939. He was elected a Fellow of the Royal Society of New Zealand in 1959, and the following year he was awarded the society's Hector Medal, the highest award in New Zealand science.

In World War II, Chamberlain was called up for the New Zealand Artillery in September 1940, and embarked as a sergeant with the Second New Zealand Expeditionary Force in mid-1941. He saw four years active service in the Middle East and Italy and was commissioned while overseas.

Chamberlain's engagement to Geraldine Baylis was announced a few days after he was drafted, and the couple were married on 12 February 1941 at King's College chapel in Ōtāhuhu. Geraldine was also a collector of plant specimens.

He died on 2 April 1993 and was buried at Purewa Cemetery in Meadowbank, Auckland.

== Selected publications ==
- Chamberlain, E.E. (1954). Plant virus diseases in New Zealand. Auckland: DSIR.
- Chamberlain, E.E. (1947). Tomato streak. Wellington: NZ Department of Agriculture.
- Chamberlain, E.E.; Atkinson, J.D. (1959). Certification of therapeutants and plant hormones. Wellington: DSIR.
- Chamberlain, E.E.; Atkinson, J.D.; Hunter, J.A. (1964). "Cross-protection between strains of apple mosaic virus". New Zealand Journal of Agricultural Research. 7 (4): 480–490. Bibcode:1964NZJAR...7..480C. doi:10.1080/00288233.1964.10416375.
