= Haskell Strait, Antarctica =

Haskell Strait refers to the ocean passage in southern McMurdo Sound, running between Cape Armitage, Ross Island and Cape Spencer-Smith, White Island, Antarctica. Oceanographically, it separates McMurdo Sound from the ocean basin (ice shelf cavity) beneath the Ross Ice Shelf. The Strait itself is around 25 km wide and in places over 900 m deep. Currents of nearly half a knot have been measured in the Strait, although typical flows are lower. It is mostly covered by the ice of the McMurdo Ice Shelf and fast ice in southern McMurdo Sound. On rare occasions sea-ice breakout exposes the north-west corner of the Strait which becomes navigable and vessels can actually moor off Scott Base.

== Name ==
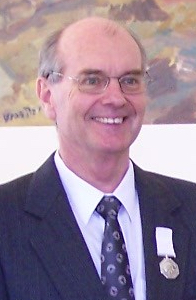
Timothy Haskell, in whose honour Haskell Strait is named

It is named after the New Zealand polar scientist Dr Timothy G. Haskell in 2009. It is unclear why it was not named previously as a strait. Possibly, this was because it is typically ice-covered and is dominated by the barrier (the McMurdo Ice Shelf). However, it dwarfs the other named ice-covered straits in the area - for example Moraine and White Straits which separate Minna Bluff from Black Island and White from Black Islands, respectively.

== History ==
The Strait was the scene of great drama during the Heroic Age of Antarctic Exploration. Apsley Cherry-Garrard describes Scott parties’ attempts to get themselves and their ponies off disintegrating sea ice, past patrolling orca, and onto the Barrier. Scott Base, the New Zealand scientific research station, was established during the International Geophysical Year 1957 and overlooks Haskell Strait.

== Oceanography ==
As it is one of the southernmost large Straits in the world, it is heavily influenced by the Earth's rotation. It is also the western gateway to the Ross Ice Shelf cavity – an enormous, essentially unknown, body of water. The cavity is a major source of supercooled water, i.e. water chilled at great depths under the ice shelf which is then released to find itself colder than the freezing temperature. Such water influences sea ice growth which in turn affects climate processes at a global scale.
