= Coleridge Farr =

Physicist, electrical engineer, university professor (1866–1943)

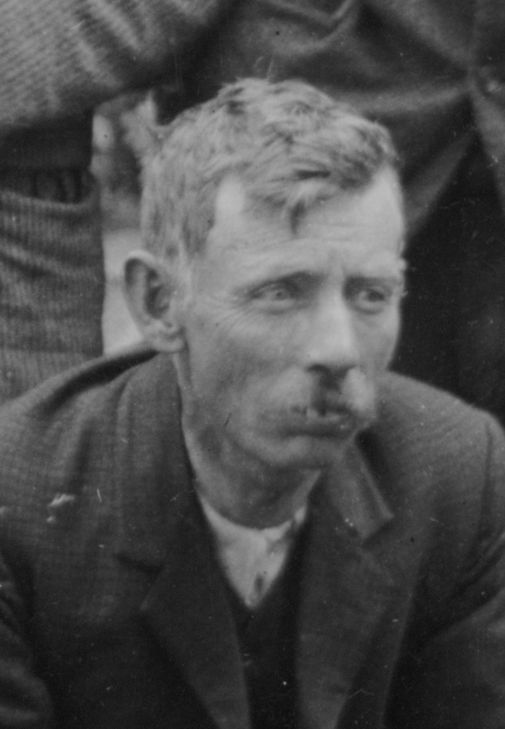
Farr in 1907

Clinton Coleridge Farr (22 May 1866 – 27 January 1943) was a New Zealand geophysicist, electrical engineer and university professor.

== Early life and career ==
Farr was born the youngest son of (Anglican) Rev. George Henry Farr and Julia Warren Farr on 22 May 1866. George (later titled Canon Farr) was first headmaster of the Collegiate School of St Peter in Adelaide, South Australia. Coleridge was educated at the University of Adelaide, University College, London and the University of Sydney.

Farr tutored at Sydney and then Adelaide from 1893 to 1896, when he was appointed lecturer in mathematics and physics at Lincoln Agricultural College near Christchurch, New Zealand. As Director of the Christchurch Magnetic Observatory (1899–1903), he organised a magnetic survey of New Zealand and was awarded the first science D.Sc. by the University of Adelaide.

As lecturer in physics and surveying at Canterbury College, Christchurch Farr was a member of the 1907 Sub-Antarctic Islands Scientific Expedition. He was created Professor of Physics at Canterbury College in 1911.

In 1919 he was elected as one of the inaugural fellows of the New Zealand Institute (the organisation has, since 2007, been known as Royal Society Te Apārangi), winning their Hector Medal in 1922 and serving as their president from 1929 to May 1931 (when he was succeeded by Hugh Segar). In 1928 he was elected a Fellow of the Royal Society of London.

== Family and death ==
In 1903, he married Maud Ellen Haydon; they had one son. He retired in 1936 and died in Christchurch, New Zealand, on 27 January 1943.
