= Derek Lawden =

English mathematician (1919–2008)

- Born: Derek Frank Lawden; 15 September 1919; Birmingham, England
- Died: 15 February 2008 (aged 88); Warwick, England
- Spouse: Mary
- Children: Gregor; Michael; Mark

Derek Frank Lawden (15 September 1919 – 15 February 2008) was a British-New Zealand mathematician.

== Academic career ==
After reading mathematics at Cambridge University he served in the Royal Artillery and then lectured at the Royal Military College of Science and the College of Advanced Technology Birmingham, where he worked on rocket trajectories and space flight. In 1956 he moved to University of Canterbury as professor. In the 1960s he received a DSc from Cambridge, was appointed a Fellow of the Royal Society of New Zealand and won the Hector Medal. He returned to the UK to University of Aston in 1967.

After the World War II, he was the first to register in the literature considerations about the use of gravity assist for space exploration. In his pioneering work on optimal space trajectories in the 1960s, he coined the term "primer vector" to refer to the adjoint variables in the costate equation associated with the velocity vector, pointing out their fundamental connection to optimal thrust.
