= Michael Hartshorn =

British-New Zealand organic chemist (1936–2017)

- Born: Michael Philip Hartshorn; 10 September 1936; Keresley, Warwickshire, England
- Died: 15 December 2017 (aged 81); Christchurch, New Zealand
- Education: University of Oxford
- Spouse: Jacqueline Joll (m. 1963)
- Awards: Hector Memorial Medal (1973)
- Scientific career
- Fields: Organic chemistry
- Workplaces: University of Canterbury
- Thesis: Steroid hormone analogues (1960)

Michael Philip Hartshorn (10 September 1936 – 15 December 2017) was a British-born New Zealand organic chemist. He was awarded the Hector Memorial Medal by the Royal Society of New Zealand in 1973.

== Early life and education ==
Born in Keresley on the outskirts of Coventry, Warwickshire, England, on 10 September 1936, Hartshorn was the son of Bernard Hartshorn and Christine Evelyn Hartshorn (née Bennett). He studied at Imperial College London, from where he graduated BSc and ARCS, and at University College, Oxford, where he obtained a DPhil in 1960. His doctoral thesis was titled Steroid hormone analogues.

Hartshorn married Jacqueline Joll in 1963, and the couple went on to have four sons. He became a naturalised New Zealand citizen in 1965.

== Academic and research career ==
Hartshorn was appointed as a lecturer in the Department of Chemistry at the University of Canterbury in Christchurch in 1960, and rose to become a professor in 1972. When he retired in 1996 he was made a professor emeritus.

Hartshorn's research centred on reaction mechanisms. He investigated the chemical rearrangement of steroids, cyclic sulfites, monoterpenes and acetylenic alcohols. His research included the ipso nitration of aromatic hydrocarbons and phenols, and their reactions with fuming nitric acid and nitrogen dioxide, as well as the chlorination of polysubstituted phenols. He also studied the reactions of cation radicals arising from the photolysis of aromatic hydrocarbons.

Hartshorn was elected a fellow of the New Zealand Institute of Chemistry in 1969, and a fellow of the Royal Society of New Zealand the following year. In 1973, he received the Hector Memorial Medal, at that time the highest honour for scientific excellence awarded by the Royal Society of New Zealand.

== Death ==
Hartshorn died in Christchurch on 15 December 2017.
