= Charles Leedham-Green =

British mathematician

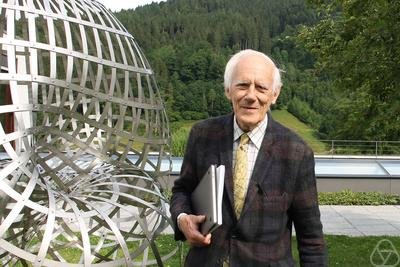
- Leedham-Green at Oberwolfach in 2025
- Born: Peebles, Scotland
- Education: University of Oxford
- Known for: Work on pro-p groups and computational group theory
- Scientific career
- Fields: Mathematician
- Workplaces: University of London
- Doctoral advisor: Kenneth Gravett

Charles R. Leedham-Green is a retired professor of mathematics at Queen Mary, University of London, known for his work in group theory. He completed his DPhil at the University of Oxford.

His parents were John Charles Leedham-Green (1902–1984), a surgeon and general practitioner in Southwold, and Gertrude Mary Somerville Caldwell.

== Work ==
With Leonard Soicher, Leedham-Green designed the product replacement algorithm; an algorithm within computational group theory that generates random elements of groups by taking a random walk through the group. This algorithm has been implemented in both GAP and MAGMA.

He is responsible for a great body of work in group theory. In recent times, this has involved research in computational group theory and pro-p groups.

The 300th edition of the Journal of Algebra was dedicated to him for his 65th birthday. On the occasion of his retirement in 2006, the Mathematics Research Centre at Queen Mary held a conference in celebration of his mathematical achievements.

== Translator of Newton's Principia ==
In 2021, Cambridge University Press published Leedham-Green's full annotated English translation of Isaac Newton's magnum opus, Philosophiæ Naturalis Principia Mathematica ("The Mathematical Principles of Natural Philosophy"), first published in Latin in 1687. Leedham-Green brought to that task a command of the Latin language and a professional's grasp of the relevant mathematics. He was motivated to produce that new translation in part by his dissatisfaction with the earlier translation of the Principia prepared by historian of science I. Bernard Cohen and classicist Anne Whitman, published in 1999 by the University of California Press. Leedham-Green found that text too obscure because of the translators' excessive concern with Newton's linguistic choices and their limited grasp of his mathematical and physical arguments. Leedham-Green's is only the fourth English translation of the complete Principia, after those of Andrew Motte (1729), Florian Cajori (1934, based on a modernization of Motte's text), and Cohen and Whitman (1999). In preparing his translation, Leedham-Green also consulted the French translation by Émilie du Châtelet (1756) and the German translation by Volkmar Schüller (1999), as well as the larger corpus of modern scholarship on Newton's scientific work.

== Selected publications ==
- Charles R. Leedham-Green, Leonard H. Soicher: Collection from the Left and Other Strategies. J. Symb. Comput. 9(5/6): 665–675 (1990)
- Charles R. Leedham-Green, Cheryl E. Praeger, Leonard H. Soicher: Computing with Group Homomorphisms. J. Symb. Comput. 12(4/5): 527–532 (1991)
- Derek F. Holt, C. R. Leedham-Green, E. A. O'Brien and Sarah Rees: Testing Matrix Groups for Primitivity. Journal of Algebra, Volume 184, Issue 3, 15 September 1996, Pages 795–817
- Derek F. Holt, C. R. Leedham-Green, E. A. O'Brien and Sarah Rees: Computing Matrix Group Decompositions with Respect to a Normal Subgroup. Journal of Algebra, Volume 184, Issue 3, 15 September 1996, Pages 818–838.
- C. R. Leedham-Green and E. A. O'Brien: Tensor Products are Projective Geometries. Journal of Algebra, Volume 189, Issue 2, 15 March 1997, Pages 514–528
- Robert Beals, Charles R. Leedham-Green, Alice C. Niemeyer, Cheryl E. Praeger, Ákos Seress: Permutations With Restricted Cycle Structure And An Algorithmic Application. Combinatorics, Probability & Computing 11(5): (2002)
- C. R. Leedham-Green and E. A. O'Brien: Recognising tensor-induced matrix groups. Journal of Algebra, Volume 253, Issue 1, 1 July 2002, Pages 14–30
- Nigel Boston and Charles Leedham-Green: Explicit computation of Galois p-groups unramified at p. Journal of Algebra, Volume 256, Issue 2, 15 October 2002, Pages 402–413.
- Charles Leedham-Green and Sue McKay: The Structure of Groups of Prime Power Order (2002)
- John J. Cannon, Bettina Eick, Charles R. Leedham-Green: Special polycyclic generating sequences for finite soluble groups. J. Symb. Comput. 38(5): 1445–1460 (2004)
- Robert Beals, Charles R. Leedham-Green, Alice C. Niemeyer, Cheryl E. Praeger and Ákos Seress: Constructive recognition of finite alternating and symmetric groups acting as matrix groups on their natural permutation modules. Journal of Algebra, Volume 292, Issue 1, 1 October 2005, Pages 4–46
- S.P. Glasby, C.R. Leedham-Green and E.A. O'Brien: Writing projective representations over subfields. Journal of Algebra, Volume 295, Issue 1, 1 January 2006, Pages 51–61
- As translator and editor: Newton, Isaac (2021) [1687]. The Mathematical Principles of Natural Philosophy. Translated by Leedham-Green, Charles R. Cambridge: Cambridge University Press. ISBN 9781107020658.
