= Joseph Bernard Chambers =

New Zealand sheep farmer, viticulturist and wine-maker

Joseph Bernard Chambers (12 March 1859–22 May 1931) was a New Zealand sheepfarmer, viticulturist and wine-maker. He was born in Te Mata, near Havelock North, Hawke's Bay, New Zealand on 12 March 1859.
