= Job Osborne =

New Zealand farmer, contractor and well-sinker

Job Osborne (26 April 1842 – 31 January 1931) was a New Zealand farmer, contractor and well-sinker. He was born in Road, Somerset, England, in 1842.
