= Mike Hinge =

American graphic designer (1931–2003)

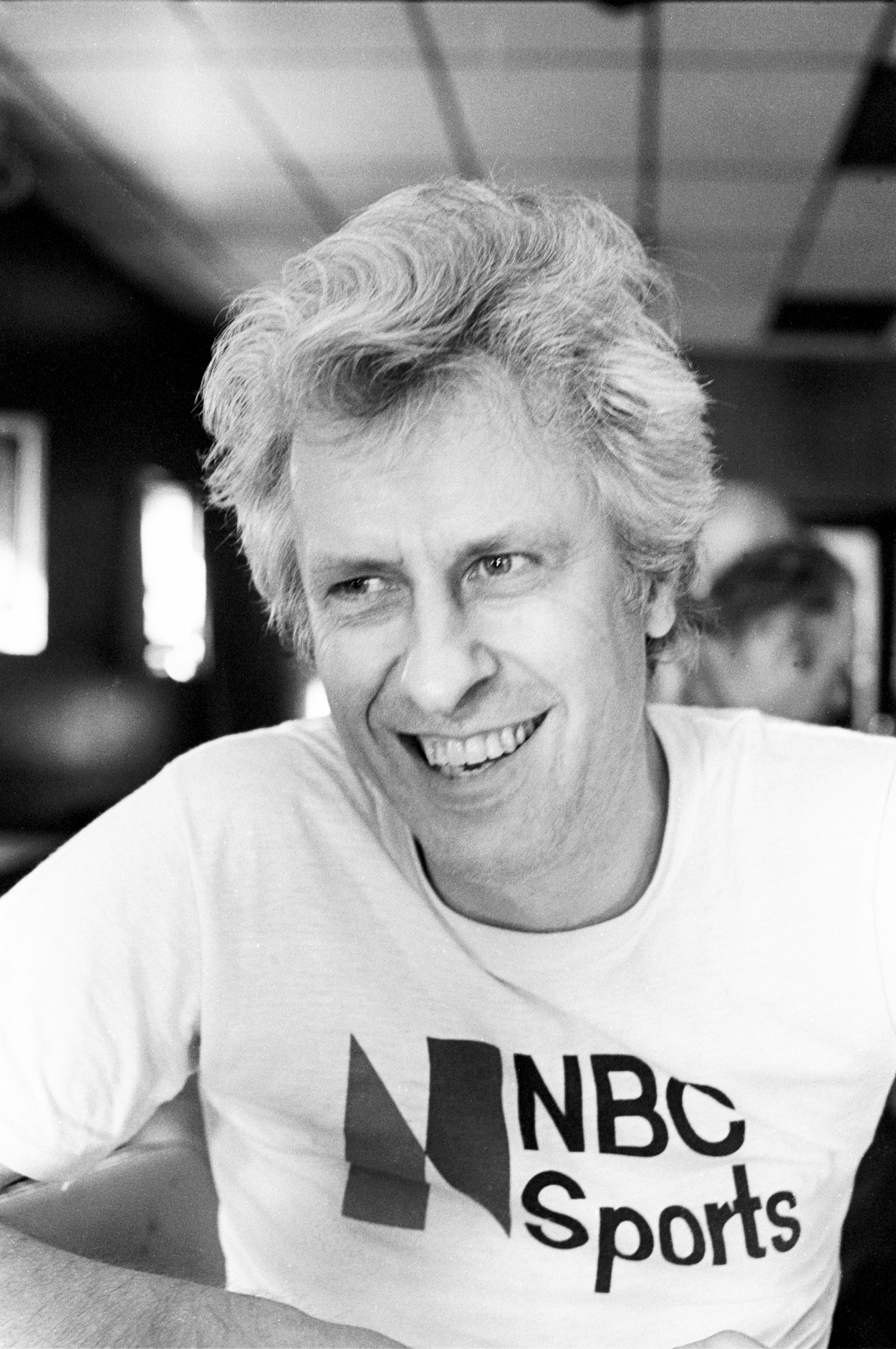
Mike Hinge in his Staten Island neighborhood bar just before returning to New Zealand in 1984, photo by Jeff Schalles

Mike Hinge (born Michael Barry Hinge, Auckland, August 9, 1931 – Philadelphia, August 2003) was an illustrator and graphic designer.

His work included portraits with a pop art influence for the cover of Time magazine: Japanese Emperor Hirohito in October, 1971 and Richard Nixon, as the Watergate crisis deepened, in November 1973. The artwork for both covers are now held by the Smithsonian.
