= Hugh Segar =

New Zealand mathematician and university professor (1868–1954)

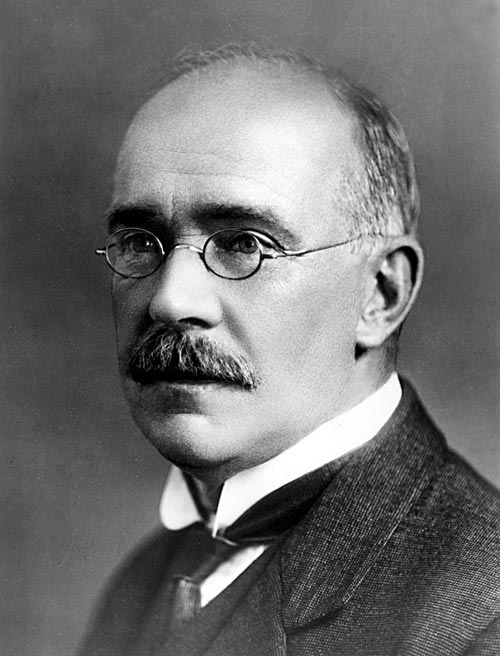
Segar (year unknown)

Hugh William Segar (31 January 1868 – 18 September 1954) was a New Zealand mathematician and university professor. He was born in Liverpool, Lancashire, England in 1868. He was educated at Liverpool College and Trinity College, Cambridge, where he was 2nd Wrangler and a Yeats Prizeman. He was Professor of Mathematics at University College, Auckland.
