= Rod Bieleski =

New Zealand botanist and academic

Rod Bieleski MNZM
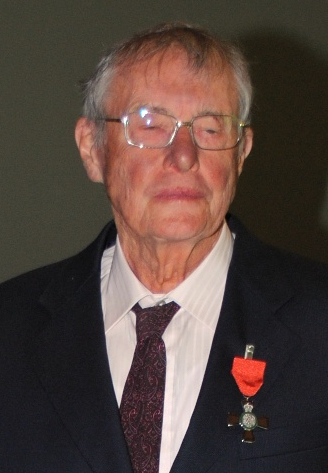
- Bieleski in 2010
- Born: Roderick Leon Bieleski; 3 August 1931; Auckland, New Zealand
- Died: 15 November 2016 (aged 85); Takapuna, New Zealand
- Education: University of Sydney
- Awards: Hector Medal (1984); Member of the New Zealand Order of Merit (2010)
- Scientific career
- Fields: Plant physiology
- Thesis: Studies on the physiology of sugar-cane (1958)

Roderick Leon Bieleski MNZM (3 August 1931 – 15 November 2016) was a New Zealand plant physiologist. As a botanist and horticulturist, his research focussed on understanding the factors that affected the behaviour of plants, in particular horticultural crops. His work had practical relevance to farmers and orchardists in building their understanding of these factors and taking account of them while making a living from growing and harvesting plants. He received many honours and awards, culminating in being appointed Member of the New Zealand Order of Merit (MNZM) in 2010.

== Early life and education ==
Born in Auckland on 3 August 1931, Bieleski was educated at Orakei Primary School and Auckland Grammar School, before entering Auckland University College in 1950. He graduated with a Bachelor of Science degree in chemistry and botany in 1952 and a Master of Science degree with first-class honours in 1955. In 1956, he completed Biochemistry III at the University of Sydney while undertaking a PhD on the process of sugar transport in sugar cane, which he completed in 1958.

== Career ==
Bieleski began work as a researcher at the New Zealand Department of Scientific and Industrial Research (DSIR) in 1958, retiring in 1996. From 1980 to 1988 he was the director of the DSIR's division of horticulture and processing.

== Selected research ==
Bieleski has been described as a "botanist and horticulturist who used the tools of chemistry, biochemistry and plant physiology to develop an understanding of the behaviour of plants in general and of horticultural crops in particular...whose work focussed on the nutrition of plants, the allocation and redistribution of both mineral and carbohydrate nutrients and the responses to stress and senescence."

=== Uptake and movement of nutrients in plants ===
Bieleski researched the uptake of sugars by plants and saw it as being important in horticultural physiology because it related to the movement of carbohydrates within plants and their accumulation in fruit. He was involved in research that explored the differences between sorbitol and sucrose in how they transport carbohydrates in the leaves of young apricot plants and intact apple plants. The significance of this study in translocation behaviour was later to become a focus for Bielesky in studies on phloem physiology. In 1996 he researched how phosphate, sulfate and sucrose were accumulated in phloem tissues and concluded that phosphate was accumulated principally in an inorganic form, and the variability in rates of uptake by different minerals, played an important role in the translocation process.

In 2000, Bieleski published an article that highlighted the importance of understanding how phloem transports are manipulated to achieve good yields in horticulture and noted that examination of the plants' behaviour, provides insight into senescence and cell death.

=== Responses to stress ===
How plants responded to stress caused by nutrient deficiency or water was a research focus for Bieleski. White clover was shown to have responded well to a water deficit because of increased levels of the cyclitol pinitol as an osmoprotectant which provided high levels of useable carbohydrate. The study concluded that more research could establish further the contribution "[that] greater relative abundance of pinitol leaves makes to dryland habitat survival."

=== Plant senescence ===
Bieleski's research also investigated physiological changes to plants during senescence. One study completed in 1991 looked at changes during senescence in a Daylily ephemeral flower. The research concluded that senescence in these flowers could be more associated with loss of membrane function, rather than being controlled by ethylene. A further conclusion was that studying the senescence of flowers offers a model that has much in common with fruit ripening because the process often happens quickly and in naturally occurring well-defined climacteric stages that are not too affected by ageing behaviour from storage of waste materials or exposure to weather.

== Associations ==
Bieleski became a Foundation Member of the Friends of the Auckland Botanic Gardens in 1983, joined the Executive Committee in 1997 and was President from 1999 to 2001. He was editor of the group's newsletter, The Auckland Garden, from 1999 to 2016. Bieleski explained that he was involved in the establishment of the group before 1977, "[as he saw it] ...to keep the 'scientific' aspect of true botanic gardens from being swamped into a general 'pretty park' development." In 2019, The Auckland Gardner noted that a new seat has been installed in the Camellia Garden and dedicated to the memory Bieleski. His dedication and work in the organisation were recognised and members of his family spoke about his commitment to the Garden.

In his role as Chairman, of the Editorial Advisory Board, New Journal of Crop and Horticultural Science, Bieleski drew attention in 1991 to the uncertainty about the future of science publishing in New Zealand, wondering if scientists were spending too much time "writing material that is peripheral to the main purpose of science...[which is]...doing research and communicating the results." He presented on this topic at a workshop held by the Royal Society of New Zealand on 19 November 1991 and stressed that it was important for scientific journals to be clear about their areas of specialisation and attract quality contributions, "[because] the publishing of science is a totally integral part of scientific research, part of the intellectual process of science - converting data to knowledge."

From 1992 to 1995 Bieleski was President of the New Zealand Society for Horticultural Science.

Bieleski was a member of the Institute Council responsible for directing the management of the Auckland Museum from 1990 to 1996, and then of the new Museum Board from 1996 to 1999.

In 1985 he was a founding trustee of the New Zealand Camellia Trust, and "from 1996 until shortly before his death, he was Registrar of the Camellia Society, responsible for registering new camellia cultivars bred in New Zealand." He was a regular contributor to the New Zealand Camellia Bulletin, and the International Camellia Journal.

== Awards and honours ==
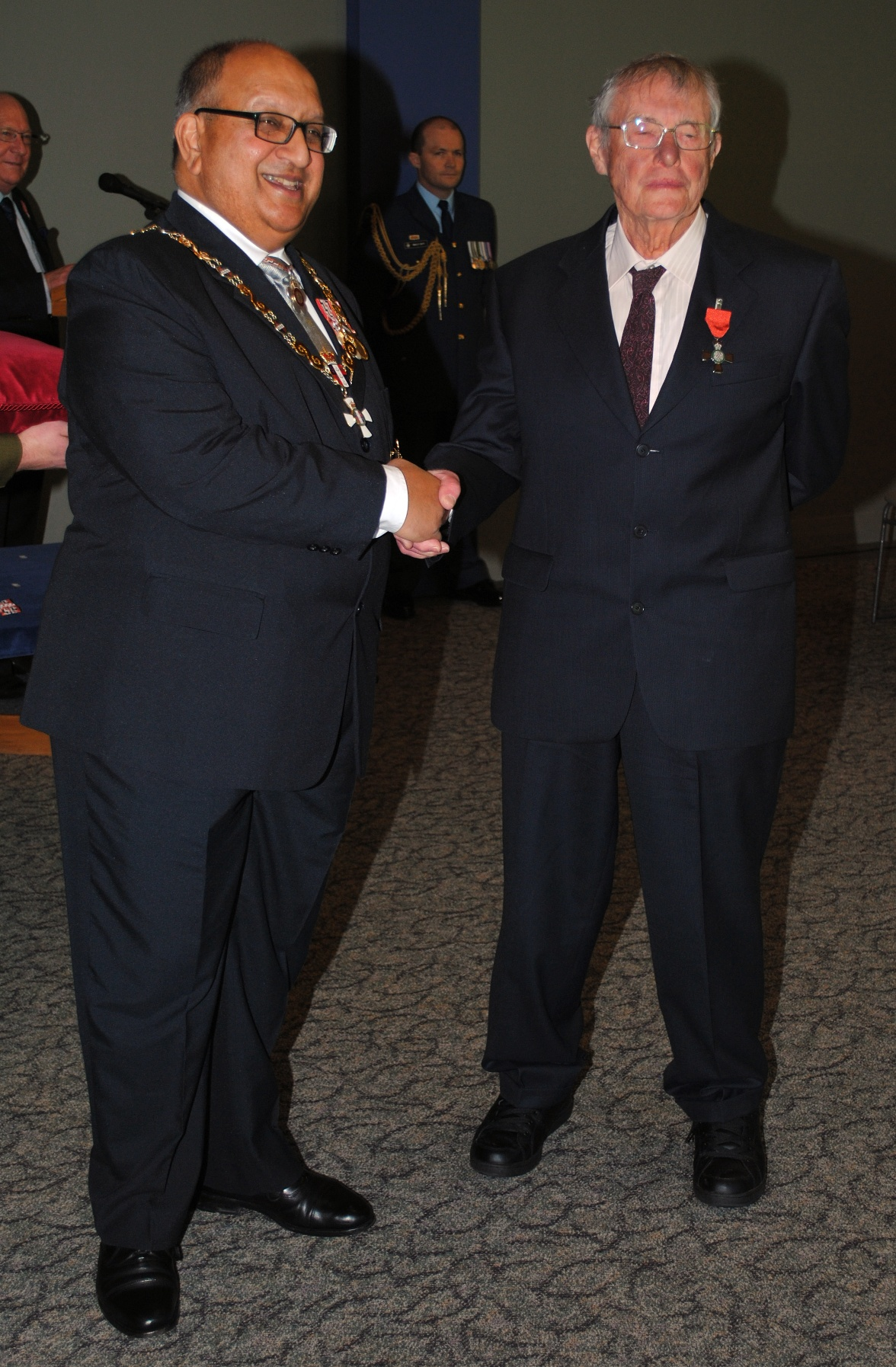
MNZM investiture

He was elected a Fellow of the Royal Society of New Zealand in 1973, and won the society's Hector Medal in 1984.

Bieleski was an Honorary Fellow at The New Zealand Institute of Agricultural and Horticultural Science Incorporated, awarded to recognise "distinguished members who have made outstanding contributions to agricultural or horticultural science and, in addition, have rendered eminent service to the Institute."

He was awarded a DSc by thesis by the University of Sydney in 1990, and he was appointed a Member of the New Zealand Order of Merit for services to horticultural science in the 2010 New Year Honours.

Bieleski died in Takapuna on 15 November 2016.

== Publications ==
- Mechanisms of regulation of plant growth (1974): A series of papers presented at an International Plant Physiology Symposium held at Massey University, 13–18 August 1973, and co-edited by Bieleski in a book published in the Bulletin Series, Royal Society of New Zealand.
- Feijoas: Origins, Cultivation and Uses (2002): Co-authored by Bieleski, this book is a guide for growers of feijoas.
- Experimental studies on factors affecting growth and distribution of kauri (Agathis australis Salisb). Auckland University MSc thesis 1955.
- A taste of New Zealand: food industry and research(1984): R L Bieleski, New Zealand. Department of Scientific and Industrial Research
