= Charles Ernest Weatherburn =

New Zealand and Australian academic

- Born: 18 June 1884; Chippendale, Sydney, New South Wales,
- Died: 18 October 1974 (aged 90); Claremont, Perth, Western Australia,
- Education: University of Sydney, Trinity College, Cambridge
- Awards: Hector Medal
- Scientific career
- Fields: Mathematics
- Workplaces: University of Melbourne, Canterbury University College

Charles Ernest Weatherburn (18 June 1884 – 18 October 1974) was an Australian-born mathematician.

Weatherburn graduated from the University of Sydney an MA in 1906. After being awarded a scholarship he studied at Trinity College, Cambridge sitting the Mathematical Tripos examinations in 1908. Weatherburn was awarded a First Class degree. On his return to Australia, Weatherburn taught at Ormond College of the University of Melbourne.

In 1923 was appointed chair of mathematics in Canterbury College, University of New Zealand. He returned to Australia in 1929 as chair of mathematics at the University of Western Australia, a post he held until he retired in 1950.

He died in Perth, Western Australia in 1974.

== Selected works ==
- A first course in mathematical statistics
- Differential geometry of three dimensions
- An introduction to Riemannian geometry and the tensor calculus
- Elementary vector analysis : With application to geometry and mechanics, London (1921); PDF/DjVu Copy at the Internet Archive.
- Advanced vector analysis
