= Sarah Rees =

Sarah Rees may refer to:

- Sarah Rees (politician), Welsh politician
- Sarah Rees (professor) (born 1957), mathematics professor
- Sarah Jane Rees (1839–1916), Welsh teacher, poet and temperance campaigner
- Sarah Lynn Rees, Australian architect
