= Robert Hayes (seismologist) =

New Zealand astronomer, seismologist and organist

- Born: Robert Cecil Hayes; 19 January 1900; Wellington
- Died: 3 September 1977 (aged 77); Auckland
- Spouse: Margaret Hayes
- Scientific career
- Fields: Seismology and astronomy
- Institutions: Dominion Observatory, Wellington

Robert Cecil Hayes (19 January 1900 – 3 September 1977) was a New Zealand astronomer, seismologist and organist. He was born in Wellington, New Zealand, on 19 January 1900.

== Career ==
Hayes did not have any formal qualifications, however he began work at the Dominion Observatory, Wellington (then named the Hector Observatory) in 1920. The observatory was responsible for maintaining the New Zealand Government Time Service. Hayes was trained in the astronomical observations necessary to keep the clocks accurate. Some of his initial work also involved working on the seismograph that the observatory inherited from seismologist George Hogben. Hayes became acting-director of the observatory after Charles Edward Adams retired from the position in 1936. He was acting-director for 12 years before the position was formalised.

One of the contributions Hayes had while at the Observatory was the application of the Richter scale in New Zealand. He was in communication with Charles Francis Richter who had been developing the scale; and by using the same Wood-Anderson type seismographs that Richter used, was able to apply it to earthquakes in New Zealand. Hayes was also interested on the research being done in the area of deep-focus earthquakes. This subsequently lead to his own research on seismic waves and the conclusion that New Zealand was on the continental side of the crust near to the boundary between continental and oceanic crust. He also confirmed the occurrence of deep-focus earthquakes in new Zealand.

In 1975, in recognition of his contributions, he was awarded the Hector Medal.

== Personal life ==
Hayes was born in Wellington on 19 January 1900, to Robert Edward Hayes and Ellen Thomas. He was educated in Wellington before attending Christ's College in Christchurch from 1914 to 1918. Hayes married Margaret Wyn Beere on 1 December 1932; they had two daughters. He was the organist at St Mary's Anglican Church in Karori, Wellington for 35 years. He died in Auckland on 3 September 1977. He was cremated and buried at Purewa Cemetery alongside his wife. She died in 1991.
