= William Francis MacWilliams =

New Zealand goldminer, businessman, bailiff and sportsman

William Francis MacWilliams (23 July 1860–18 January 1931) was a New Zealand goldminer, businessman, bailiff and sportsman. He was born in Papakura, Auckland, New Zealand on 23 July 1860.
