= Nola Barron =

New Zealand potter (born 1931)

- Born: 1931 (age 94–95); Christchurch, New Zealand
- Known for: Pottery

Nola Barron (born 1931) is a New Zealand potter.

Barron has been a prominent member of New Zealand's studio pottery movement since the 1960s. She has studied under Yvonne Rust. She was an early member of the Canterbury Potter's Association, formed in 1963, to co-ordinate the common interests of potters in the Canterbury and West Coast regions.

Barron was director of the Canterbury Society of Arts between 1977 and 1986 (temporary director from 1976, the position was made permanent in 1984), and after her directorship remained a vice-president until 1988. She was appointed honorary curator at the Robert McDougall art gallery (now part of the Christchurch Art Gallery Te Puna o Waiwhetu) alongside Peter Ireland.

Barron has exhibited throughout New Zealand, including with:

- Canterbury Society of Arts
- New Zealand Academy of Fine Arts
- The Group in 1967, 1968, 1970, 1974, 1976, and 1977

Her work is held in the collection of the Christchurch Art Gallery Te Puna o Waiwhetu.
