= Peter Goddard (educationalist) =

New Zealand educationalist

Peter Robert Goddard (18 July 1931 – 7 February 2012) was a New Zealand educationalist.

== Biography ==
He spent his childhood in Auckland and received his secondary education at St Peter's College (1943–1949) and his tertiary education at Auckland University where he studied English Literature and Classics. He later obtained the degrees of ED MA (Hons) (Auckland), DipEd (Auckland), DipTch AIE(London).

Goddard taught English at Auckland Grammar School and moved to Thames High School as Head of English. He was appointed the fourth Head of English in 1964 at Mount Albert Grammar School which felt "the influence of his enthusiasm and drive". Goddard published a book entitled A History of the place of grammar in secondary schools from 1920–1967 based on his Dip Ed thesis. He co-authored a book on linguistics and later wrote seven secondary school English textbooks. In 1968 he took up a lectureship in English at the University of Canterbury.

In 1974 he became the foundation Principal of Orewa College. Goddard then held the positions of Inspector of Schools and later the northern regional superintendent of education under the old Education Department. He was the first national Manager for Auckland in the new Ministry of Education from 1989. He retired from that position. Goddard continued as relieving principal at many schools. In retirement he was closely involved with the St Peter's College International Centre.

At various times, Goddard was chairman of the Whangarei Education Development Initiative, Auckland Catholic Integrated Schools Board, and the St Stephen's School Board of Trustees. He was a member of the Auckland College of Education Council and the organiser of the Australasian Education Council Conference. Goddard was active in the Territorial Force where he reached the rank of major.

== Death and legacy ==
Goddard died on 7 February 2012, aged 80. His Requiem Mass at St Patrick's Cathedral on 13 February 2012 was attended by a congregation of 800.

Goddard was a founding member of the Auckland Secondary School Band and Orchestra Festival and served on the committee for over 20 years; the Peter Goddard Memorial Award is awarded annually at the Auckland Secondary School Music Festival (the KBB Music Festival, which endows the award) to "an ensemble whose performance, presentation or behaviour embodies the values that Peter Goddard held" in "recognition of the support given by Peter Goddard during his lifetime to the development of young musicians".
