= Con Cambie =

New Zealand chemist

- Born: Richard Conrad Cambie; 1931 (age 94–95); Tauranga, New Zealand
- Education: Auckland University College; University of Oxford
- Scientific career
- Fields: Natural products chemistry
- Workplaces: University of Auckland
- Thesis: Fungal polyacetylenes (1963)
- Doctoral students: Bill Denny (medical researcher)

Richard Conrad "Con" Cambie (born 1931) is a New Zealand natural products chemist known for his research into bioactive compounds.

Born in 1931 in Tauranga, Cambie was educated at Tauranga College. He attended Auckland University College, graduating with an MSc with first-class honours in 1955 and a PhD in 1958. Appointed to the staff of chemistry department at Auckland in 1958, Cambie then studied at the University of Oxford, where he was awarded a DPhil in 1963. He was awarded a DSc, on the basis of publications submitted, in 1964.

He returned to the University of Auckland and, following the retirement of Bob Briggs in 1969, he was appointed to a professorial chair. For 17 years he also served as assistant to the vice-chancellor (student services). On his retirement in 1996 Cambie was granted the title of professor emeritus.

He was elected a Fellow of the Royal Society of New Zealand in 1966, and the following year he was awarded the society's Hector Medal, New Zealand's highest science honour at that time. He is the author or co-author of 430 scientific papers.

== Selected works ==
- Cambie, Richard Conrad; Ash, Julian (1993). Fijian medicinal plants. Auckland, New Zealand: University of Auckland. OCLC 221431418.
- Cambie, Richard Conrad; Brewis, Alexandra Avril (1997). Anti-fertility plants of the Pacific. CSIRO. OCLC 245936371.
- Cambie, Richard Conrad; Davis, B.R. (1983). A century of chemistry at the University of Auckland. Auckland, New Zealand: Percival Publishing. OCLC 151664658.
