= English cricket team in Australia in 2021–22 =

International cricket tour

	Australia	England
- Dates: 8 December 2021 – 18 January 2022
Captains	Pat Cummins (Note: Steve Smith captained Australia for the second Test match.)	Joe Root

Test series
- Result: Australia won the 5-match series 4–0
Most runs	Travis Head (357)	Joe Root (322)
Most wickets	Pat Cummins (21)	Mark Wood (17)
- Player of the series: Travis Head (Aus)

The England cricket team toured Australia in December 2021 and January 2022 to play five Tests, which formed The Ashes. In May 2021, Cricket Australia confirmed the fixtures for the tour. The Test series was also part of the 2021–2023 ICC World Test Championship. The England Lions also toured Australia during November and December 2021, before the majority of the team flew home before the second Test match.

Australia successfully retained the Ashes by winning the first three Test matches. The fourth Test ended in a draw, with Australia winning the fifth Test by 146 runs to win the series 4–0.

== Squads ==
Australia A	England Lions
Nic Maddinson (c); Mitchell Swepson (vc); Sean Abbott; Ashton Agar; Scott Boland; ~~Alex Carey (wk)~~; Henry Hunt; Josh Inglis (wk); Usman Khawaja; Mitchell Marsh; Michael Neser; Matt Renshaw; Mark Steketee; Bryce Street	Alex Lees (c); Tom Abell; Josh Bohannon; Harry Brook; James Bracey; ~~Brydon Carse~~; Mason Crane; Matthew Fisher; Ben Foakes (wk); Saqib Mahmood; Liam Norwell; Matt Parkinson; ~~Dom Sibley~~; Jamie Smith; Robert Yates

On 21 October 2021, the England and Wales Cricket Board (ECB) announced that Dom Sibley had withdrawn from the England Lions squad, with Harry Brook named as his replacement. Three days before the first match of the tour for the England Lions, Brydon Carse suffered a knee injury and was ruled out of the series. Alex Carey was added to Australia's Test squad for the Ashes as a replacement for Tim Paine, and was removed from the A squad.

== Tour matches ==
Before the first Ashes Test match, England played a three-day match and a four-day match against England Lions. Australia were also scheduled to play a three-day intra-squad match, but the match was cancelled due to rain. As well as the Ashes Test matches, Australia A played the England Lions in a four-day match.

23–25 November 2021
Scorecard

England	v	England Lions
0/98 (29 overs); Haseeb Hameed 53* (109)

Match drawn
Peter Burge Oval, Brisbane

- England won the toss and elected to bat.
- Only 29 overs of play was possible on day 1 due to rain.
- No play was possible on day 2 and day 3 due to rain.

30 November–3 December 2021
Scorecard

England Lions	v	England
4/226 (80 overs); Zak Crawley 45 (80); Ben Stokes 2/31 (12 overs)

Match drawn
Ian Healy Oval, Brisbane

- England won the toss and elected to field.
- No play was possible on day 1 and day 2 due to rain.

9–12 December 2021
Scorecard

Australia A	v	England Lions
213 (70.5 overs); Mark Steketee 39 (33); Liam Norwell 5/58 (16.5 overs)		103 (43.3 overs); Josh Bohannon 22 (43); Michael Neser 5/29 (15.3 overs)
4/349d (87 overs); Bryce Street 119* (254); Dom Bess 2/157 (37 overs)		347 (128.2 overs); James Bracey 113 (295); Matt Renshaw 2/26 (14 overs)

Australia A won by 112 runs
Ian Healy Oval, Brisbane
Umpires: Shawn Craig and Donovan Koch
Player of the match: Michael Neser (Australia A)

- Australia A won the toss and elected to bat.

== Test series ==
=== 1st Test ===
8–12 December 2021
Scorecard

England; 147 (50.1 overs) & 297 (103 overs)	v	Australia; 425 (104.3 overs) & 1/20 (5.1 overs)

Australia won by 9 wickets
The Gabba, Brisbane

=== 2nd Test ===
16–20 December 2021 (D/N)
Scorecard

Australia; 9/473d (150.4 overs) & 9/230d (61 overs)	v	England; 236 (84.1 overs) & 192 (113.1 overs)

Australia won by 275 runs
Adelaide Oval, Adelaide

=== 3rd Test ===
26–30 December 2021
Scorecard

England; 185 (65.1 overs) & 68 (27.4 overs)	v	Australia; 267 (87.5 overs)

Australia won by an innings and 14 runs
Melbourne Cricket Ground, Melbourne

=== 4th Test ===
5–9 January 2022
Scorecard

Australia; 8/416d (134 overs) & 6/265d (68.5 overs)	v	England; 294 (79.1 overs) & 9/270 (102 overs)

Match drawn
Sydney Cricket Ground, Sydney

=== 5th Test ===
14–18 January 2022 (D/N)
Scorecard

Australia; 303 (75.4 overs) & 155 (56.3 overs)	v	England; 188 (47.4 overs) & 124 (38.5 overs)

Australia won by 146 runs
Bellerive Oval, Hobart
