= 2025–26 Ashes series =

Test cricket series between Australia and England

- Part of English cricket team in Australia in 2025–26
- Date: 21 November 2025 – 8 January 2026
- Location: Australia
- Result: Australia won the five-match series 4–1
- Player of the series: Compton–Miller Medal: Mitchell Starc (Aus)
Teams
- Australia: England
Captains
- Steve Smith (Note: In the absence of Test captain Pat Cummins due to injury, Steve Smith assumed the captaincy for the first, second, fourth and fifth Tests.); Pat Cummins (Note: Cummins returned to the captaincy in the third Test.): Ben Stokes
Most runs
- Travis Head (629) Alex Carey (323) Steve Smith (286): Joe Root (400); Harry Brook (358); Zak Crawley (273)
Most wickets
- Mitchell Starc (31) Scott Boland (20) Michael Neser (15): Brydon Carse (22); Josh Tongue (18); Ben Stokes (15)

The 2025–26 Ashes series, branded as NRMA Insurance Men's Ashes Series for sponsorship purposes, was the 74th edition of the Ashes, a series of Test cricket matches played between Australia and England. The five-Test series was played in Australia between 21 November 2025 and 8 January 2026. The series formed part of the 2025–2027 ICC World Test Championship.

Prior to the series, Australia held the Ashes, having won the 2021–22 series and drawn in 2023. Australia won the first three Tests, to take an unassailable 3–0 lead in the series and consequently retained the Ashes. England won the Fourth Test in Melbourne by 4 wickets, ending an 18-match (14-year) winless streak in Australia in Ashes Tests and preventing a whitewash. In the Fifth Test, Australia won by 5 wickets and thus ended the series with a 4 – 1 series result.

== Squads ==
| Australia | England |
|---|---|
| Steve Smith (c); Sean Abbott; Scott Boland; Alex Carey (wk); Pat Cummins (c); Brendan Doggett; Cameron Green; ~~Josh Hazlewood~~; Travis Head; Josh Inglis (wk); Usman Khawaja; Marnus Labuschagne; Nathan Lyon; Todd Murphy; Michael Neser; Jhye Richardson; Mitchell Starc; Jake Weatherald; Beau Webster | Ben Stokes (c); Harry Brook (vc); Jofra Archer; Gus Atkinson; Shoaib Bashir; Jacob Bethell; Brydon Carse; Zak Crawley; Ben Duckett; Matthew Fisher; Will Jacks; Ollie Pope (wk); Matthew Potts; Joe Root; Jamie Smith (wk); Josh Tongue; Mark Wood |

Australia named a 15-man squad for the first Test, with regular captain Pat Cummins unavailable due to injury. On 12 November, Sean Abbott was ruled out of the first Test with a moderate-grade hamstring injury, and was replaced by Brendan Doggett. On 15 November, Josh Hazlewood was ruled out of the first Test with a hamstring injury, and was replaced by Michael Neser. On 24 November, Hazlewood was ruled out of the second Test, before being ruled out of the rest of the series on 9 December. Pat Cummins was also added back to the squad and returned to captain the team in the third test. On 23 December, Pat Cummins and Nathan Lyon were ruled out of the remainder of the Test series due to back issues and a hamstring injury, respectively. The pair were replaced by Jhye Richardson and Todd Murphy.

On 9 December, Mark Wood was ruled out of remainder of the Test series with a knee injury, and was replaced by Matthew Fisher. On 24 December, Jofra Archer was ruled out of the remainder of the Test series with a side strain. On 29 December, Gus Atkinson was ruled out of the fifth Test with a hamstring injury.

== Venues ==
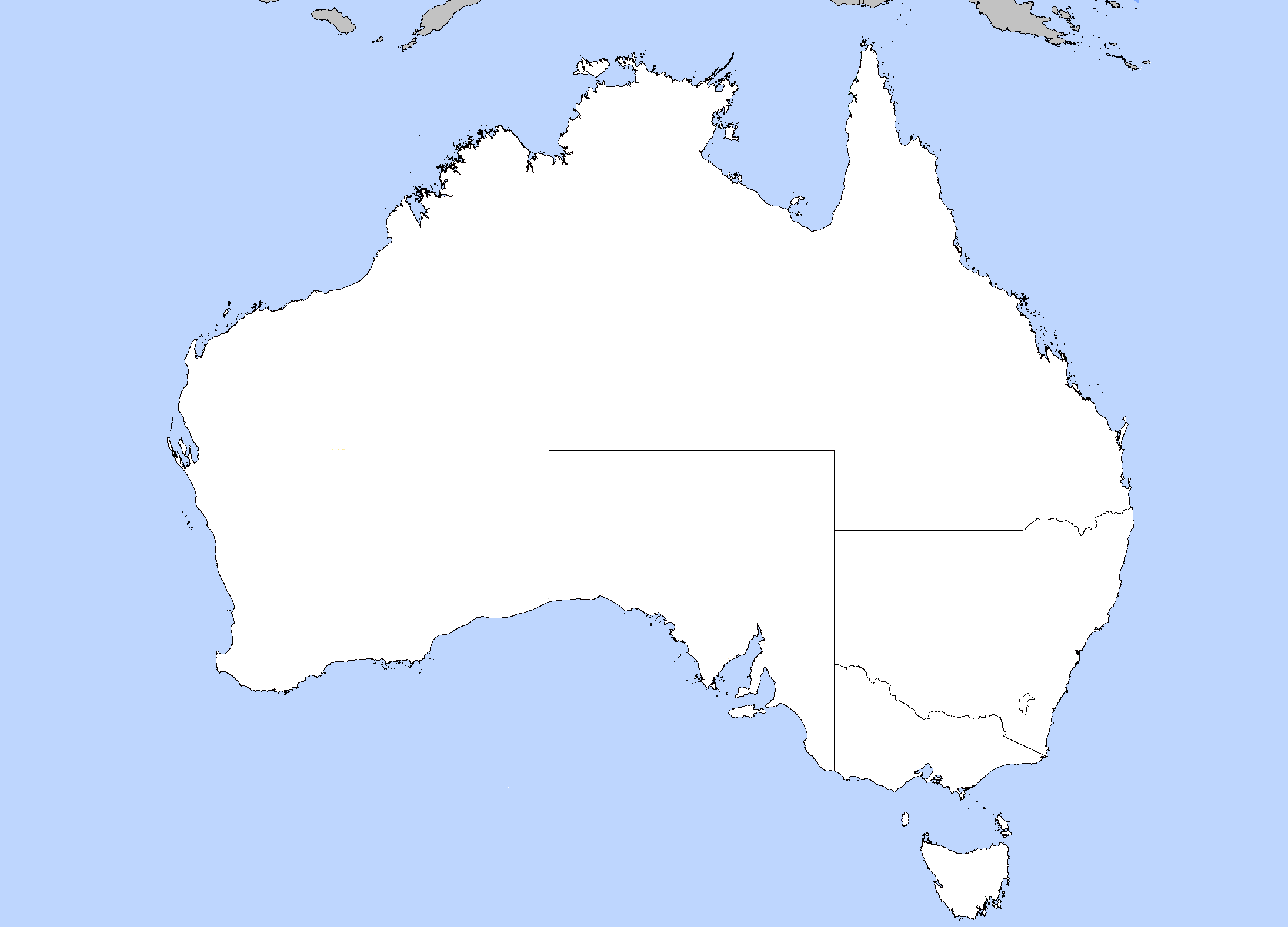

The five venues are Perth Stadium, The Gabba, Adelaide Oval, Melbourne Cricket Ground and Sydney Cricket Ground. The venues and dates for the series were announced by Cricket Australia on 16 October 2024.

Perth Stadium hosted the first Test of the series. This was the first time Perth Stadium hosted an Ashes Test and marked the return of Ashes cricket to Perth, after the city was not included in the schedule for the 2021–22 series.

It was the first Ashes series in Australia not to commence at the Gabba in Brisbane, since the 1982–83 series. Brisbane instead hosted the second Test of the series, which was a day/night match.

== Tour matches ==
On 24 July 2025, Cricket Australia announced the fixtures for the warm-up matches. On 29 July, Cricket Australia announced the pink-ball Ashes warm-up match between Prime Minister's XI and England XI. The England preparation was criticised by several former players in advance with the team only playing a warm-up game against England Lions, rather than a more extensive warm-up schedule of First Class or tour matches.

=== England XI v England Lions ===
13–15 November 2025
Scorecard

| England Lions | v | England XI |
| 382 (79.3 overs); Will Jacks 84 (85); Ben Stokes 6/52 (16 overs) | | 426 (85.3 overs); Ollie Pope 100 (113); Jacob Bethell 3/14 (4.3 overs) |
| 6/251d (44.5 overs); Jacob Bethell 70 (80); Brydon Carse 3/65 (11 overs) | | 5/202 (34.4 overs); Ollie Pope 90 (67); Will Jacks 2/67 (9.4 overs) |

England XI won by 5 wickets
Lilac Hill Park, Perth
Umpires: Simon Bussey (Aus) and Ahmad Khan (Aus)

- England XI won the toss and elected to field.

=== Prime Minister's XI v England XI ===
29–30 November 2025 (D/N)
Scorecard

| Prime Minister's XI | v | England XI |
| 8/308d (83 overs); Campbell Kellaway 82 (126); Tom Haines 2/51 (12 overs) | | 2/309 (66.3 overs); James Rew 92* (123); Campbell Thompson 1/46 (11 overs) |

England XI won by 8 wickets
Manuka Oval, Canberra
Umpires: Gerard Abood (Aus) and Ben Treloar (Aus)

- Prime Minister's XI won the toss and elected to bat.

== Matches ==
=== First Test ===
21–22 November 2025
Scorecard

| England | v | Australia |
| 172 (32.5 overs); Harry Brook 52 (61); Mitchell Starc 7/58 (12.5 overs) | | 132 (45.2 overs); Alex Carey 26 (26); Ben Stokes 5/23 (6 overs) |
| 164 (34.4 overs); Gus Atkinson 37 (32); Scott Boland 4/33 (11.4 overs) | | 2/205 (28.2 overs); Travis Head 123 (83); Brydon Carse 2/44 (5.2 overs) |

Australia won by 8 wickets
Perth Stadium, Perth
Umpires: Adrian Holdstock (SA) and Nitin Menon (Ind)
Player of the match: Mitchell Starc (Aus)

- England won the toss and elected to bat.
- Brendan Doggett and Jake Weatherald (Aus) both made their Test debuts.
- This was the first time the side batting last won at Perth Stadium.
- Mitchell Starc's (Aus) 7/58 first innings bowling figures were a career-best in Test cricket.
- Head's century off 69 balls was the second-fastest in Ashes history.
- This Test was the first Ashes Test to be concluded inside two days since the first Test of 1921 and the shortest by balls bowled since 1888.
- World Test Championship points: Australia 12, England 0.

=== Second Test ===
4–7 December 2025 (D/N)
Scorecard

| England | v | Australia |
| 334 (76.2 overs); Joe Root 138* (206); Mitchell Starc 6/75 (20 overs) | | 511 (117.3 overs); Mitchell Starc 77 (141); Brydon Carse 4/152 (29 overs) |
| 241 (75.2 overs); Ben Stokes 50 (152); Michael Neser 5/42 (16.2 overs) | | 2/69 (10 overs); Steve Smith 23* (9); Gus Atkinson 2/37 (5 overs) |

Australia won by 8 wickets
The Gabba, Brisbane
Umpires: Adrian Holdstock (SA) and Sharfuddoula (Ban)
Player of the match: Mitchell Starc (Aus)

- England won the toss and elected to bat.
- Mitchell Starc (Aus) surpassed Wasim Akram (Pak) to become the highest wicket-taker as a left-arm fast-bowler in Tests. Starc also overtook Stuart Broad to make the most Test runs at number 9.
- Travis Head (Aus) scored his 4,000th run in Tests.
- In Australia's first innings, all eleven batters reached double figures in a Test innings for the third time in their history.
- Joe Root (Eng) scored his first ever century in Australia.
- Michael Neser (Aus) took his maiden five-wicket haul in Tests.
- World Test Championship points: Australia 12, England 0.

=== Third Test ===
17–21 December 2025
Scorecard

| Australia | v | England |
| 371 (91.2 overs); Alex Carey 106 (143); Jofra Archer 5/53 (20.2 overs) | | 286 (87.2 overs); Ben Stokes 83 (198); Scott Boland 3/45 (15.2 overs) |
| 349 (84.4 overs); Travis Head 170 (219); Josh Tongue 4/70 (18 overs) | | 352 (102.5 overs); Zak Crawley 85 (151); Pat Cummins 3/48 (17 overs) |

Australia won by 82 runs
Adelaide Oval, Adelaide
Umpires: Nitin Menon (Ind) and Ahsan Raza (Pak)
Player of the match: Alex Carey (Aus)

- Australia won the toss and elected to bat.
- Will Jacks' first-innings economy rate of 5.25 was the second-highest in Test history for any bowler to have delivered 20 overs (behind Jimmy Sinclair in 1902).
- Australia won and retained the Ashes as a result of this match. It was also the fifth consecutive Ashes series Australia has retained.
- Australia retained the Ashes in 11 days, the quickest series victory since 2002–03.
- World Test Championship points: Australia 12, England 0.

=== Fourth Test ===
26–27 December 2025
Scorecard

| Australia | v | England |
| 152 (45.2 overs); Michael Neser 35 (49); Josh Tongue 5/45 (11.2 overs) | | 110 (29.5 overs); Harry Brook 41 (34); Michael Neser 4/45 (10 overs) |
| 132 (34.3 overs); Travis Head 46 (67); Brydon Carse 4/34 (11 overs) | | 6/178 (32.2 overs); Jacob Bethell 40 (46); Jhye Richardson 2/22 (5.2 overs) |

England won by 4 wickets
Melbourne Cricket Ground, Melbourne
Umpires: Kumar Dharmasena (SL) and Chris Gaffaney (NZ)
Player of the match: Josh Tongue (Eng)

- England won the toss and elected to field.
- Josh Tongue (Eng) took his first five-wicket haul in Australia. He also became the first England player to take five-wicket haul at the MCG since 1998.
- The Day 1 crowd of 94,199 was the largest in the history of cricket in Australia, beating the previous record of 93,013 at the 2015 Cricket World Cup final.
- Harry Brook (Eng) became the fastest batsman to score 3,000 runs in Tests in terms of balls faced.
- Steve Smith (Aus) surpassed Allan Border to become the second highest run-scorer in Ashes history after Don Bradman.
- Ben Duckett (Eng) scored his 3,000th run in Tests.
- This was England's first Test win in Australia for almost 15 years.
- This was the second Test of this Ashes series to be completed in two days. This made the 2025-26 Ashes series the first Ashes series since the 1888 series (held in England) to have two or more two-day tests over the course of an Ashes series.
- This test was only 17th occasion in the history of Test Cricket (out of 2615 Tests) where no batsmen from either team made a half century in the match and the second such occurrence in a test played at the Melbourne Cricket Ground.
- World Test Championship points: England 12, Australia 0.

=== Fifth Test ===
4–8 January 2026
Scorecard

| England | v | Australia |
| 384 (97.3 overs); Joe Root 160 (242); Michael Neser 4/60 (18.3 overs) | | 567 (133.5 overs); Travis Head 163 (166); Josh Tongue 3/97 (30 overs) |
| 342 (88.2 overs); Jacob Bethell 154 (265); Beau Webster 3/64 (16 overs) | | 5/161 (31.2 overs); Marnus Labuschagne 37 (40); Josh Tongue 3/42 (11 overs) |

Australia won by 5 wickets
Sydney Cricket Ground, Sydney
Umpires: Chris Gaffaney (NZ) and Ahsan Raza (Pak)
Player of the match: Travis Head (Aus)

- England won the toss and elected to bat.
- Usman Khawaja (Aus) played in his last Test match.
- Jacob Bethell (Eng) scored his maiden century in Tests and First-class cricket overall.
- Attendance over the 5 days of play was 211,032, an SCG Test record.
- World Test Championship points: Australia 12, England 0.

== Statistics ==
=== Leading run-scorers ===
| Rank | Name | Runs | Inns. | NO | HS | Ave. | 100s | 50s | SR |
|---|---|---|---|---|---|---|---|---|---|
| 1 | (Australia) Travis Head | 629 | 10 | 0 | 170 | 62.90 | 3 | 0 | 87.36 |
| 2 | (England) Joe Root | 400 | 10 | 1 | 160 | 44.44 | 2 | 0 | 58.30 |
| 3 | (England) Harry Brook | 358 | 10 | 1 | 84 | 39.77 | 0 | 2 | 81.73 |
| 4 | (Australia) Alex Carey | 323 | 8 | 1 | 106 | 46.14 | 1 | 2 | 72.25 |
| 5 | (Australia) Steve Smith | 286 | 8 | 3 | 138 | 57.20 | 1 | 1 | 63.69 |
Source: ESPNcricinfo

=== Leading wicket-takers ===
| Rank | Name | Wkts. | Ovs. | Mdns. | Runs | Eco. | Ave. | Best. |
|---|---|---|---|---|---|---|---|---|
| 1 | (Australia) Mitchell Starc | 31 | 153.1 | 15 | 618 | 4.03 | 19.93 | 7/58 |
| 2 | (England) Brydon Carse | 22 | 138.4 | 13 | 667 | 4.81 | 30.31 | 4/34 |
| 3 | (Australia) Scott Boland | 20 | 159.5 | 27 | 499 | 3.12 | 24.95 | 4/33 |
| 4 | (England) Josh Tongue | 18 | 97.2 | 5 | 362 | 3.71 | 20.11 | 5/45 |
| 5 | (Australia) Michael Neser | 15 | 82.5 | 9 | 299 | 3.60 | 19.93 | 5/42 |
| 5 | (England) Ben Stokes | 15 | 101.1 | 12 | 377 | 3.72 | 25.13 | 5/23 |
Source: ESPNcricinfo
