= Michael Neser =

Australian cricketer (born 1990)

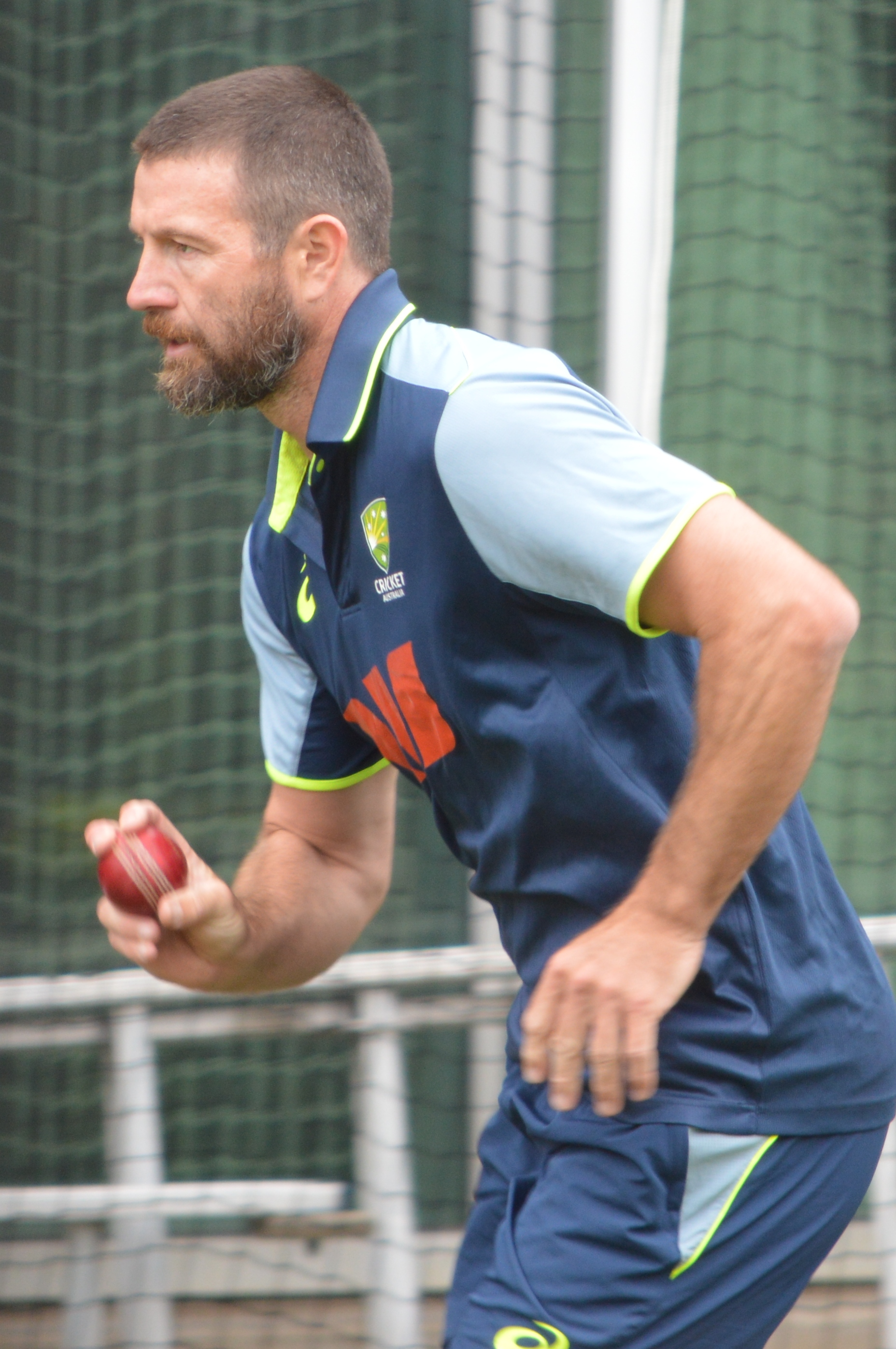
- Neser in December 2025

Personal information
- Full name: Michael Gertges Neser
- Born: 29 March 1990 (age 36); Pretoria, Transvaal Province, South Africa
- Height: 1.83 m (6 ft 0 in)
- Batting: Right-handed
- Bowling: Right-arm medium-fast
- Role: Bowling all-rounder

International information
- National side: Australia (2018–present)
- Test debut (cap 462): 16 December 2021 v England
- Last Test: 4 January 2026 v England
- ODI debut (cap 225): 13 June 2018 v England
- Last ODI: 15 September 2023 v South Africa
- ODI shirt no.: 18

Domestic team information
- Years: Team
- 2010/11–present: Queensland
- 2011/12 2021/22-present: Brisbane Heat
- 2012/13–2020/21: Adelaide Strikers
- 2013: Kings XI Punjab
- 2021–2023: Glamorgan
- 2024: Hampshire

Career statistics
Competition	Test	ODI	FC	LA
Matches	5	4	122	74
Runs scored	131	11	4111	993
Batting average	18.71	2.75	27.40	23.09
100s/50s	0/0	0/0	5/18	1/3
Top score	35	6	176*	122
Balls bowled	778	220	21786	3408
Wickets	22	3	440	89
Bowling average	18.90	79.66	23.45	33.64
5 wickets in innings	1	0	14	1
10 wickets in match	0	0	0	0
Best bowling	5/42	2/46	7/32	5/28
Catches/stumpings	4/–	1/–	68/–	22/–
Medal record
Men's Cricket
Representing Australia
ICC World Test Championship
Winner	2021-2023
- Source: ESPNcricinfo, 17 March 2026

Michael Gertges Neser (/ˈniːsər/ NEE-sər; born 29 March 1990) is an Australian professional cricketer. In domestic cricket, he represents Queensland, and the Brisbane Heat in the Big Bash League, as well as Glamorgan in the County Championship, Royal London One-Day Cup and T20 Blast. He made his international debut for Australia in June 2018. He was a member of the Australian team that won the 2023 ICC World Test Championship final.

== Early life ==
Neser was born in Pretoria, South Africa, but moved to Queensland, Australia, with his family when he was 10 years old, settling on the Gold Coast. There he began playing junior cricket for the Broadbeach-Robina Cats and made his first grade debut for the Gold Coast Dolphins at 17 years of age in February 2008. He attended The Southport School throughout his teenage years where he competed in the GPS competition and was awarded back-to-back Paul Norris Trophies in 2006-07 as the school's First XI all-rounder of the year as well as the Westcott Family Trophy for First XI bowler of the year in 2007. In the 2008–09 season he was selected to represent Queensland's under-19 team, and in 2010 he was given a rookie contract with Queensland's state team.

== Domestic career ==
In the 2010–11 summer, Neser made both his first-class and List A cricket debuts in the Sheffield Shield and Ryobi Cup respectively, both for Queensland. On his first-class debut against Western Australia, Neser took an impressive four wickets on the opening day. In 2011 Neser was upgraded from a rookie contract to a full contract with Queensland, and though he was performing well, regular injuries made it difficult for Neser to lock down a permanent spot in Queensland's team.

In the inaugural season of the Big Bash League, Australia's new Twenty20 tournament, Neser played for Queensland's new team, the Brisbane Heat. He was impressive enough during the tournament that he was selected to play for the Prime Minister's XI in a Twenty20 tour match against Sri Lanka. He changed clubs from the Heat to the Adelaide Strikers for future BBL seasons.

As a result of his form for the Heat in BBL|01 and the Strikers in BBL|02, Neser was given a shock contract with the Kings XI Punjab in the Indian Premier League. He made his IPL debut in May 2013, but the game did not go well for him. In his four overs Neser conceded 62 runs without taking a wicket, falling one run short of the most expensive bowling figures in IPL history. Nonetheless, Neser's form in Australia remained strong, and in the 2013–14 summer he was strong in both of the shorter forms of the game. In the 2013–14 Ryobi One-Day Cup he was the equal-highest wicket taker for Queensland with 10 wickets at an average of 27.40, and in BBL|03 he was named the Strikers' Most Valuable Player after taking 10 wickets at an average of 19.90.

Because of Neser's career-best form in both one-day and Twenty20 cricket, he was given the opportunity to play for Australia's second team, Australia A, in a series of matches against South Africa A late in the 2014 winter. A back injury ruled Neser out of the entirety of BBL|04, and Neser hasn't reached his top form since.

In March 2018, Cricket Australia named Neser in their Sheffield Shield team of the year. In October 2019 he signed as an overseas player for Surrey for the first half of the 2020 season. In October 2020, in the opening round of the 2020–21 Sheffield Shield season, Neser scored his maiden first-class century.

== International career ==
In May 2018, he was added to Australia's One Day International (ODI) squad for their series against England, replacing Josh Hazlewood. He made his ODI debut on 13 June 2018, against England. In September 2018, he was named in Australia's Test squad for their series against Pakistan, but he did not play.

In July 2019, he was named in Australia's squad for the 2019 Ashes series in England. On 16 July 2020, Neser was named in a 26-man preliminary squad of players to begin training ahead of a possible tour to England following the COVID-19 pandemic.

In November 2020, Neser was named in Australia's Test squad for their series against India. In January 2021, Neser was named in Australia's Test squad for their series against South Africa. In November 2021, Neser was named in Australia's Test squad for the 2021–22 Ashes series.

=== Test debut ===
On 16 December 2021, after captain Pat Cummins was ruled out of the second Test in Adelaide due to a COVID-19 close contact and Josh Hazlewood was ruled out due to injury, Neser made his Test debut as Cummins' replacement with Jhye Richardson also coming into the squad. He scored a quick fire 35 off 24 balls with 5 fours and a six as Australia chased quick runs prior to a declaration in their first innings. He came on as the first change bowler in the English first innings & with his second ball in Test cricket he dismissed Haseeb Hameed. In the Australian second innings he was promoted up the order as nightwatchman, doing his job in seeing out the day then being dismissed early on day four, scoring three runs. He took the wicket of Dawid Malan in the final innings of the match to support Jhye Richardson's maiden five wicket haul as Australia won the match by 275 runs. Neser was dropped for the third test in order to facilitate the return of Cummins as the selectors elected to give Scott Boland his debut as an injury replacement for Richardson in preference to retaining Neser in the 11 man team. Neser returned to domestic cricket.

=== Test recall ===
In December 2022, Neser was recalled to Australia's Test team along with Scott Boland after Pat Cummins and Josh Hazlewood were ruled out due to injury, recording match figures of 5/56 and scoring 18 runs in his only innings with the bat. Despite the strong performance, Neser was left out of the XI for Australia's next Test series against South Africa in favour of Boland as Cummins returned to fitness. Selected for the Test team playing England in December, 2025, Neser took five wickets in the second innings of the 2025–26 Ashes Test at The Gabba, Neser's home ground.
