= English cricket team in India in 2016–17 =

International cricket tour

	India	England
- Dates: 9 November 2016 – 1 February 2017
Captains	Virat Kohli	Alastair Cook (Tests); Eoin Morgan (ODIs & T20Is)

Test series
- Result: India won the 5-match series 4–0
Most runs	Virat Kohli (655)	Joe Root (491)
Most wickets	Ravichandran Ashwin (28)	Adil Rashid (23)
- Player of the series: Virat Kohli (Ind)

One Day International series
- Results: India won the 3-match series 2–1
Most runs	Kedar Jadhav (232)	Jason Roy (220)
Most wickets	Hardik Pandya (5); Jasprit Bumrah (5)	Chris Woakes (6)
- Player of the series: Kedar Jadhav (Ind)

Twenty20 International series
- Results: India won the 3-match series 2–1
Most runs	Suresh Raina (104)	Joe Root (126)
Most wickets	Yuzvendra Chahal (8)	Chris Jordan (5)
- Player of the series: Yuzvendra Chahal (Ind)

The English cricket team toured India between November 2016 and January 2017 to play five Tests, three One Day Internationals (ODIs) and three Twenty20 International (T20I) matches. The Board of Control for Cricket in India (BCCI) confirmed the dates of the tour in July 2016. India last hosted a five-Test series in 1986–87 against Pakistan.

India agreed to use the Decision Review System (DRS) for this series against England on trial basis to evaluate the improvements made in the system. This was the first time since 2008 that there was a bilateral series involving India with all the components of the review system in place, including "Ultra Edge". However, Hot Spot was not amongst the tools available to be used. DRS was used in the ODI series between the two teams.

The Test series was played for Anthony De Mello Trophy, with India winning the 5-match series 4–0. During the fifth Test of the series, India made their highest total ever in Test cricket, scoring 759 runs for 7 wickets before declaring their innings. India's victory in the fifth Test broke their record for consecutive Tests without defeat, taking their total to eighteen unbeaten matches. They also finished the year with nine Test victories, the most ever for India.

Prior to the naming of the squads for the ODI and T20I matches, MS Dhoni announced that he was standing down as India's limited-overs captain. Virat Kohli was appointed as captain for the ODI and T20I fixtures. Dhoni played in what was planned to be his final match as captain of an Indian team in the first 50-over tour match against England XI on 10 January 2017. However, he would return to the captaincy in September 2018, during the 2018 Asia Cup.

The ODI series was a high scoring series with an aggregate of 2,090 runs being scored, which was the highest number of runs in a series of three or fewer matches. All the innings in the series recorded a score of more than 300. India won the ODI series 2–1 and the T20I series by the same margin. It was the first time that India had won a T20I bilateral series against England.

== Squads ==
Tests		ODIs		T20Is	
India	England	India	England	India	England
Virat Kohli (c); Ajinkya Rahane (vc); Ravichandran Ashwin; Gautam Gambhir; Ravindra Jadeja; Bhuvneshwar Kumar; Amit Mishra; Karun Nair; Manish Pandey; ~~Hardik Pandya~~; Parthiv Patel (wk); Cheteshwar Pujara; KL Rahul; Wriddhiman Saha (wk); Mohammed Shami; Ishant Sharma; Shardul Thakur; Murali Vijay; Jayant Yadav; Umesh Yadav	Alastair Cook (c); Joe Root (vc); Moeen Ali; James Anderson; Zafar Ansari; Jonny Bairstow (wk); Jake Ball; Gary Ballance; Gareth Batty; Stuart Broad; Jos Buttler (wk); Liam Dawson; Ben Duckett; Steven Finn; Haseeb Hameed; Keaton Jennings; Adil Rashid; Ben Stokes; Chris Woakes	Virat Kohli (c); Ravichandran Ashwin; Jasprit Bumrah; Shikhar Dhawan; MS Dhoni (wk); Ravindra Jadeja; Kedar Jadhav; Bhuvneshwar Kumar; Amit Mishra; Manish Pandey; Hardik Pandya; Ajinkya Rahane; KL Rahul; Yuvraj Singh; Umesh Yadav	Eoin Morgan (c); Jos Buttler (vc, wk); Moeen Ali; Jonny Bairstow (wk); Jake Ball; Sam Billings; Liam Dawson; Alex Hales; Liam Plunkett; Adil Rashid; Joe Root; Jason Roy; Ben Stokes; David Willey; Chris Woakes	Virat Kohli (c); ~~Ravichandran Ashwin~~; Jasprit Bumrah; Yuzvendra Chahal; MS Dhoni (wk); ~~Ravindra Jadeja~~; Bhuvneshwar Kumar; Amit Mishra; Ashish Nehra; Manish Pandey; Hardik Pandya; Rishabh Pant (wk); KL Rahul; Suresh Raina; Parvez Rasool; Mandeep Singh; Yuvraj Singh	Eoin Morgan (c); Moeen Ali; Jonny Bairstow; Jake Ball; Sam Billings; Jos Buttler (wk); Liam Dawson; ~~Alex Hales~~; Chris Jordan; Tymal Mills; Liam Plunkett; Adil Rashid; Joe Root; Jason Roy; Ben Stokes; David Willey

James Anderson was added to England's squad after recovering from injury. KL Rahul was added to India's squad for the second Test. Bhuvneshwar Kumar was added to India's squad for the last three Tests, while Gautam Gambhir was dropped. Due to thigh strain Wriddhiman Saha missed the third Test. Parthiv Patel was called up as his replacement. KL Rahul and Hardik Pandya got injured while training in the nets at the PCA Stadium. Pandya was released from the squad, however, Rahul was expected to be fit for the fourth Test. England's Haseeb Hameed injured his hand in the third Test and went home to undergo surgery on it. Keaton Jennings was named as Hameed's replacement and Liam Dawson replaced Zafar Ansari, who injured his back. Ishant Sharma was released from the squad for the fourth Test for his wedding and rejoined the squad for the last Test. Saha also missed the last two Tests as he had not recovered fully from injury. Ajinkya Rahane missed the final two Tests of the series due to a finger injury. He was replaced by Manish Pandey. Shardul Thakur was added to India's squad as cover for Mohammed Shami who had a sore knee. Alex Hales was ruled out of the remaining limited-overs fixtures after he fractured his hand during the second ODI. Jonny Bairstow was named as Hales' replacement for the T20I fixtures. Ahead of the T20I series, India rested Ravichandran Ashwin and Ravindra Jadeja, replacing them with Amit Mishra and Parvez Rasool.

== Test series ==
=== 1st Test ===
9–13 November 2016
Scorecard

England	v	India
537 (159.3 overs); Ben Stokes 128 (235); Ravindra Jadeja 3/86 (30 overs)		488 (162 overs); Murali Vijay 126 (301); Adil Rashid 4/114 (31 overs)
260/3d (75.3 overs); Alastair Cook 130 (243); Amit Mishra 2/60 (13 overs)		172/6 (52.3 overs); Virat Kohli 49* (98); Adil Rashid 3/64 (14.3 overs)

Match drawn
Saurashtra Cricket Association Stadium, Rajkot
Umpires: Kumar Dharmasena (SL) and Chris Gaffaney (NZ)
Player of the match: Moeen Ali (Eng)

- England won the toss and elected to bat.
- This was the first Test match at this venue.
- Haseeb Hameed (Eng) made his Test debut and became England's youngest player to open the batting on debut.
- This was Gautam Gambhir's last Test match
- Stuart Broad (Eng) played his 100th Test.
- Alastair Cook set a new record for most Tests as captain for England (55).
- Alastair Cook's century in England's second innings was his fifth in India, the most by any visiting player in Tests.
- Alastair Cook's century was his 12th as captain, the most by an England captain in Tests.

=== 2nd Test ===
17–21 November 2016
Scorecard

India	v	England
455 (129.4 overs); Virat Kohli 167 (267); James Anderson 3/62 (20 overs)		255 (102.5 overs); Ben Stokes 70 (157); Ravichandran Ashwin 5/67 (29.5 overs)
204 (63.1 overs); Virat Kohli 81 (109); Stuart Broad 4/33 (14 overs)		158 (97.3 overs); Alastair Cook 54 (188); Jayant Yadav 3/30 (11.3 overs)

India won by 246 runs
Dr. Y.S. Rajasekhara Reddy ACA-VDCA Cricket Stadium, Visakhapatnam
Umpires: Kumar Dharmasena (SL) and Rod Tucker (Aus)
Player of the match: Virat Kohli (Ind)

- India won the toss and elected to bat.
- This was the first Test match at this venue.
- Jayant Yadav (Ind) made his Test debut.
- Virat Kohli (Ind) and Joe Root (Eng) both played their 50th Test.
- Murali Vijay and Cheteshwar Pujara (Ind) both passed 3,000 runs in Tests.
- Ten England batsman were dismissed by LBW in the match, the most for England in Tests.
- James Anderson was dismissed for a king pair, the first time an England batsman had been out for two first-ball ducks in a Test since 1906.

=== 3rd Test ===
26–30 November 2016
Scorecard

England	v	India
283 (93.5 overs); Jonny Bairstow 89 (177); Mohammed Shami 3/63 (21.5 overs)		417 (138.2 overs); Ravindra Jadeja 90 (170); Ben Stokes 5/73 (26.2 overs)
236 (90.2 overs); Joe Root 78 (179); Ravichandran Ashwin 3/81 (26.2 overs)		104/2 (20.2 overs); Parthiv Patel 67* (54); Chris Woakes 1/16 (2 overs)

India won by 8 wickets
Punjab Cricket Association IS Bindra Stadium, Mohali
Umpires: Marais Erasmus (SA) and Chris Gaffaney (NZ)
Player of the match: Ravindra Jadeja (Ind)

- England won the toss and elected to bat.
- Karun Nair (Ind) made his Test debut.
- Ravichandran Ashwin, Ravindra Jadeja and Jayant Yadav provided the first instance for India and 14th overall of batsmen at batting position 7, 8 and 9 to score 50+ runs in the same innings.

=== 4th Test ===
8–12 December 2016
Scorecard

England	v	India
400 (130.1 overs); Keaton Jennings 112 (219); Ravichandran Ashwin 6/112 (44 overs)		631 (182.3 overs); Virat Kohli 235 (340); Adil Rashid 4/192 (55.3 overs)
195 (55.3 overs); Joe Root 77 (112); Ravichandran Ashwin 6/55 (20.3 overs)

India won by an innings and 36 runs
Wankhede Stadium, Mumbai
Umpires: Marais Erasmus (SA) (Note: Marais Erasmus (SA) replaced Paul Reiffel as the on-field umpire on Day 1 due to injury.) and Bruce Oxenford (Aus)
Player of the match: Virat Kohli (Ind)

- England won the toss and elected to bat.
- Keaton Jennings (Eng) made his Test debut.
- Keaton Jennings (Eng) scored his first century in Tests. His innings of 112 was the highest by any opener on Test debut against India.
- Virat Kohli (Ind) passed 4,000 runs in Tests, 2,000 runs in Tests as captain and made the highest score in Tests by an Indian captain and also highest score by an Indian against England.
- Virat Kohli became the first batsman to hold a batting average of more than 50.00 in all three formats simultaneously.
- Jayant Yadav (Ind) made his first century in Tests and the first century for an Indian batsman batting at number 9.
- Ravindra Jadeja (Ind) took his 100th wicket in Tests.
- India equaled their record of consecutive Tests without a defeat (17).

=== 5th Test ===
16–20 December 2016
Scorecard

England	v	India
477 (157.2 overs); Moeen Ali 146 (262); Ravindra Jadeja 3/106 (45 overs)		759/7d (190.4 overs); Karun Nair 303* (381); Stuart Broad 2/80 (27 overs)
207 (88 overs); Keaton Jennings 54 (121); Ravindra Jadeja 7/48 (25 overs)

India won by an innings and 75 runs
M. A. Chidambaram Stadium, Chennai
Umpires: Marais Erasmus (SA) and Simon Fry (Aus)
Player of the match: Karun Nair (Ind)

- England won the toss and elected to bat.
- Liam Dawson (Eng) made his Test debut.
- Alastair Cook (Eng) became the tenth and youngest player to make 11,000 runs in Tests.
- Karun Nair (Ind) became the first batsman for India to convert his maiden century into a triple century in Tests.
- India's first innings total was their highest score in Tests and was the most runs made against England by any team.
- Ravindra Jadeja (Ind) took his first ten-wicket haul in Tests.
- England's first-innings total of 477 was the highest total in Test cricket that ended in a innings defeat.
- India broke their record of consecutive Test victory without a defeat (18).
- Amit Mishra (Ind) played his last test.

== ODI series ==
=== 1st ODI ===
15 January 2017
13.30 (D/N)
Scorecard

England; 350/7 (50 overs)	v	India; 356/7 (48.1 overs)
Joe Root 78 (95); Hardik Pandya 2/46 (9 overs)		Virat Kohli 122 (105); Jake Ball 3/67 (10 overs)

India won by 3 wickets
Maharashtra Cricket Association Stadium, Pune
Umpires: Kumar Dharmasena (SL) and C. K. Nandan (Ind)
Player of the match: Kedar Jadhav (Ind)

- India won the toss and elected to field.
- Ben Stokes scored the fastest ODI fifty by an England batsman against India.
- This was England's highest ODI score in India and also their highest against India.
- Virat Kohli (Ind) scored his fifteenth century in a successful run-chase in an ODI, the most for any batsman.
- India's total was the highest successful run-chase in an ODI by any team against England.

=== 2nd ODI ===
19 January 2017
13.30 (D/N)
Scorecard

India; 381/6 (50 overs)	v	England; 366/8 (50 overs)
Yuvraj Singh 150 (127); Chris Woakes 4/60 (10 overs)		Eoin Morgan 102 (81); Ravichandran Ashwin 3/65 (10 overs)

India won by 15 runs
Barabati Stadium, Cuttack
Umpires: Anil Chaudhary (Ind) and Ruchira Palliyaguruge (SL)
Player of the match: Yuvraj Singh (Ind)

- England won the toss and elected to field.
- This was England's highest total against India, their highest total batting second and their highest total in a losing cause in an ODI.
- Yuvraj Singh (Ind) made his first 150 in ODIs.
- When England reached 350, it was the 100th time that any team had reached 350 runs in ODIs.

=== 3rd ODI ===
22 January 2017
13.30 (D/N)
Scorecard

England; 321/8 (50 overs)	v	India; 316/9 (50 overs)
Jason Roy 65 (56); Hardik Pandya 3/49 (10 overs)		Kedar Jadhav 90 (75); Ben Stokes 3/63 (10 overs)

England won by 5 runs
Eden Gardens, Kolkata
Umpires: Anil Chaudhary (Ind) and Kumar Dharmasena (SL)
Player of the match: Ben Stokes (Eng)

- India won the toss and elected to field.
- Virat Kohli (Ind) reached 1,000 runs in ODIs as captain in the fewest innings (17).
- Ravindra Jadeja (Ind) became the first Indian left-arm spinner to reach 150 wickets in ODIs.

== T20I series ==
=== 1st T20I ===
26 January 2017
16.30 (D/N)
Scorecard

India; 147/7 (20 overs)	v	England; 148/3 (18.1 overs)
MS Dhoni 36* (27); Moeen Ali 2/21 (4 overs)		Eoin Morgan 51 (38); Yuzvendra Chahal 2/27 (4 overs)

England won by 7 wickets
Green Park Stadium, Kanpur
Umpires: Anil Chaudhary (Ind) and Nitin Menon (Ind)
Player of the match: Moeen Ali (Eng)

- England won the toss and elected to field.
- Parvez Rasool (Ind) made his T20I debut.
- Virat Kohli (Ind) captained India for the first time in T20Is.
- This was the first T20I match to be played at this venue.
- Eoin Morgan became the first batsman for England to score 1,500 runs in T20Is.

=== 2nd T20I ===
29 January 2017
19.00 (D/N)
Scorecard

India; 144/8 (20 overs)	v	England; 139/6 (20 overs)
KL Rahul 71 (47); Chris Jordan 3/22 (4 overs)		Ben Stokes 38 (27); Ashish Nehra 3/28 (4 overs)

India won by 5 runs
Vidarbha Cricket Association Stadium, Nagpur
Umpires: Anil Chaudhary (Ind) and Chettithody Shamshuddin (Ind)
Player of the match: Jasprit Bumrah (Ind)

- England won the toss and elected to field.

=== 3rd T20I ===
1 February 2017
19.00 (D/N)
Scorecard

India; 202/6 (20 overs)	v	England; 127 (16.3 overs)
Suresh Raina 63 (45); Liam Plunkett 1/22 (2 overs)		Joe Root 42 (37); Yuzvendra Chahal 6/25 (4 overs)

India won by 75 runs
M. Chinnaswamy Stadium, Bangalore
Umpires: Anil Chaudhary (Ind) and Nitin Menon (Ind)
Player of the match: Yuzvendra Chahal (Ind)

- England won the toss and elected to field.
- Rishabh Pant (Ind) made his T20I debut and became the youngest player for India to do so.
- Yuzvendra Chahal became the first bowler for India to take a five wicket haul in T20Is.
- MS Dhoni (Ind) scored his maiden T20I half-century.
- India won their fourth T20I bilateral series, involving three or more T20Is.
- England's collapse of 8 wickets for 8 runs was the second worst 8-wicket collapse in international cricket.
- Yuvraj Singh (Ind) played his last T20I match

== Tour matches ==
=== 50-over match: India A v England XI ===
10 January 2017
13.30 (D/N)
Scorecard

India A 304/4 (50 overs)	v	England XI; 307/7 (48.5 overs)
Ambati Rayudu 100 (97); David Willey 2/55 (10 overs)		Sam Billings 93 (85); Kuldeep Yadav 5/60 (10 overs)

England XI won by 3 wickets
Brabourne Stadium, Mumbai
Umpires: Anil Dandekar (Ind) and Pashchim Pathak (Ind)

- England XI won the toss and elected to field.
- Kuldeep Yadav (India A) took his maiden five-wicket haul in List A cricket.

=== 50-over match: India A v England XI ===
12 January 2017
10.00
Scorecard

England XI; 282 (48.5 overs)	v	India A 283/4 (39.4 overs)
Jonny Bairstow 64 (65); Parvez Rasool 3/38 (10 overs)		Ajinkya Rahane 91 (83); David Willey 1/32 (5 overs)

India A won by 6 wickets
Brabourne Stadium, Mumbai
Umpires: Anil Dandekar (Ind) and Pashchim Pathak (Ind)

- England XI won the toss and elected to bat.
- 12 players per side (11 batting, 11 fielding).
