= Indian cricket team in Australia in 2015–16 =

International cricket tour

	Australia	India
- Dates: 8 – 31 January 2016
Captains	Steve Smith (ODIs); Aaron Finch (1st & 2nd T20Is); Shane Watson (3rd T20I)	MS Dhoni

One Day International series
- Results: Australia won the 5-match series 4–1
Most runs	Steve Smith (315)	Rohit Sharma (441)
Most wickets	John Hastings (10)	Ishant Sharma (9)
- Player of the series: Rohit Sharma (Ind)

Twenty20 International series
- Results: India won the 3-match series 3–0
Most runs	Shane Watson (151)	Virat Kohli (199)
Most wickets	Shane Watson (3)	Jasprit Bumrah (6)
- Player of the series: Virat Kohli (Ind)

The Indian cricket team toured Australia from 8 to 31 January 2016 to play two tour matches, five One Day International (ODI) and three Twenty20 International (T20I) matches. The full schedule for the tour was announced by Cricket Australia on 9 July 2015.

Australia won the ODI series 4–1. The series broke the record for the most runs scored in a bilateral ODI series of five matches or fewer, with a total of 3,159. Eleven centuries were also scored in the ODI series, which was also a record. India won the T20I series 3–0 and became the number one ranked team in the ICC T20I Championship.

== Squads ==
ODIs		T20Is	
Australia	India	Australia	India
Steve Smith (c); David Warner (vc); George Bailey; Scott Boland; James Faulkner; Aaron Finch; John Hastings; Josh Hazlewood; Usman Khawaja; Nathan Lyon; Mitchell Marsh; Shaun Marsh; Glenn Maxwell; Joel Paris; Kane Richardson; Matthew Wade (wk)	MS Dhoni (c) (wk); Virat Kohli (vc); Ravichandran Ashwin; Jasprit Bumrah; Rishi Dhawan; Shikhar Dhawan; Ravindra Jadeja; Manish Pandey; Axar Patel; Ajinkya Rahane; ~~Mohammed Shami~~; Ishant Sharma; Rohit Sharma; Gurkeerat Singh; Barinder Sran; Umesh Yadav; Bhuvneshwar Kumar	Aaron Finch (c); Shane Watson (vc); Cameron Bancroft (wk); Scott Boland; Cameron Boyce; James Faulkner; John Hastings; Travis Head; Chris Lynn; Nathan Lyon; Shaun Marsh; Glenn Maxwell; Kane Richardson; Steve Smith; Shaun Tait; Andrew Tye; Matthew Wade (wk); David Warner	MS Dhoni (c) (wk); Virat Kohli (vc); Ravichandran Ashwin; Jasprit Bumrah; Rishi Dhawan; Shikhar Dhawan; Ravindra Jadeja; ~~Bhuvneshwar Kumar~~; Ashish Nehra; Hardik Pandya; Suresh Raina; Ajinkya Rahane; ~~Mohammed Shami~~; Rohit Sharma; Gurkeerat Singh; Harbhajan Singh; Yuvraj Singh; Umesh Yadav

Mohammed Shami was ruled out of the tour with a hamstring injury. He was replaced by Bhuvneshwar Kumar for the ODI matches and Jasprit Bumrah for the T20I matches. John Hastings was added to Australia's squad to replace Mitchell Marsh for the second ODI. Usman Khawaja was added to Australia's squad to replace David Warner for the second and third ODIs who left the group on paternity leave. Nathan Lyon and David Warner were added to Australia's squad for the 4th and 5th ODIs. Joel Paris and Usman Khawaja were both dropped. Bhuvneshwar Kumar was ruled out of the T20 series due to a thumb injury. He was replaced in the squad by Rishi Dhawan. Cameron Bancroft was added to Australia's squad for the third T20I as a replacement for Matthew Wade. Shane Watson replaced Aaron Finch as captain of Australia's team for the last T20I match, due to Finch being injured.

== Tour matches ==
=== T20: Western Australia XI v Indians ===
8 January
18:00 (D/N)
Scorecard

Indians; 4/192 (20 overs)	v	Western Australia XI; 6/118 (20 overs)
Virat Kohli 74 (44); Ryan Duffield 1/21 (4 overs)		Travis Birt 74* (60); Ravindra Jadeja 2/13 (3 overs); Axar Patel 2/13 (3 overs)

Indians won by 74 runs
WACA Ground, Perth
Umpires: J. Hewitt (Aus) and Donovan Koch (Aus)

- Indians won the toss and elected to bat.
- 15 players per side (11 batting, 11 fielding).

=== One Day: Western Australia XI v Indians ===
9 January
14:30 (D/N)
Scorecard

Indians; 249 (49.1 overs)	v	Western Australia XI; 185 (49.2 overs)
Rohit Sharma 67 (82); Drew Porter 5/37 (9.1 overs)		Jaron Morgan 50 (66); Rishi Dhawan 2/28 (7 overs)

Indians won by 64 runs
WACA Ground, Perth
Umpires: Nathan Johnstone (Aus) and Donovan Koch (Aus)

- Indians won the toss and elected to bat.
- 14 players per side (11 batting, 11 fielding).

== ODI series ==
=== 1st ODI ===
12 January
11:20
Scorecard

India; 3/309 (50 overs)	v	Australia; 5/310 (49.2 overs)
Rohit Sharma 171* (163); James Faulkner 2/60 (10 overs)		Steve Smith 149 (135); Barinder Sran 3/56 (9.2 overs)

Australia won by 5 wickets
WACA Ground, Perth
Umpires: Simon Fry (Aus) and Richard Kettleborough (Eng)
Player of the match: Steve Smith (Aus)

- India won the toss and elected to bat.
- Scott Boland, Joel Paris (both Aus) and Barinder Sran (Ind) all made their ODI debuts.
- Rohit Sharma's 171 not out is the highest individual ODI score against Australia in Australia.
- This was the first ODI game with two double-century partnerships, with Rohit Sharma and Virat Kohli for India scoring 207 runs and Steve Smith and George Bailey for Australia scoring 242 runs.
- Smith's and Bailey's 242 was the highest 3rd wicket partnership and fourth highest overall for Australia.
- This was the highest successful run chase in an ODI match at the WACA.
- Rohit Sharma (Ind) became the fastest batsman to score 1,000 ODI runs against Australia, achieving this in 19 innings.

=== 2nd ODI ===
15 January
13:20 (D/N)
Scorecard

India; 8/308 (50 overs)	v	Australia; 3/309 (49 overs)
Rohit Sharma 124 (127); James Faulkner 2/64 (10 overs)		George Bailey 76* (58); Ravindra Jadeja 1/50 (9 overs)

Australia won by 7 wickets
The Gabba, Brisbane
Umpires: Richard Kettleborough (Eng) and Mick Martell (Aus)
Player of the match: Rohit Sharma (Ind)

- India won the toss and elected to bat.
- Rohit Sharma (Ind) became the third player to hit back-to-back ODI hundreds against Australia in Australia.
- This was the highest successful run chase in an ODI match at the Gabba.

=== 3rd ODI ===
17 January
14:20 (D/N)
Scorecard

India; 6/295 (50 overs)	v	Australia; 7/296 (48.5 overs)
Virat Kohli 117 (117); John Hastings 4/58 (10 overs)		Glenn Maxwell 96 (83); Ravindra Jadeja 2/49 (10 overs)

Australia won by 3 wickets
Melbourne Cricket Ground, Melbourne
Umpires: Simon Fry (Aus) and Richard Kettleborough (Eng)
Player of the match: Glenn Maxwell (Aus)

- Australia won the toss and elected to field.
- Rishi Dhawan and Gurkeerat Singh (both Ind) made their ODI debuts.
- Virat Kohli (Ind) passed 7,000 ODI runs, doing so in the fewest innings (161). He also became the fastest player to reach 24 ODI centuries (161 innings).
- Indian captain Mahendra Singh Dhoni became the third player to captain more than 300 international matches. He is also the only player to lead his side in 50 or more matches in all three formats of the game.
- This was the highest successful run chase in an ODI match at the MCG.
- This was Australia's 17th consecutive win in ODI matches at home, the longest streak for any side.

=== 4th ODI ===
20 January
14:20 (D/N)
Scorecard

Australia; 8/348 (50 overs)	v	India; 323 (49.2 overs)
Aaron Finch 107 (107); Ishant Sharma 4/77 (10 overs)		Shikhar Dhawan 126 (113); Kane Richardson 5/68 (10 overs)

Australia won by 25 runs
Manuka Oval, Canberra
Umpires: Richard Kettleborough (Eng), John Ward (Aus) and Paul Wilson (Aus)
Player of the match: Kane Richardson (Aus)

- Australia won the toss and elected to bat.
- Kane Richardson (Aus) took his first ODI five-wicket haul and it was also the first five-wicket haul in an ODI at the Manuka Oval.
- Virat Kohli became the fastest player to reach 25 ODI centuries (162 innings).
- Umpire Richard Kettleborough (Eng) was injured during Australia's innings and was replaced by third umpire Paul Wilson (Aus).

=== 5th ODI ===
23 January
14:20 (D/N)
Scorecard

Australia; 7/330 (50 overs)	v	India; 4/331 (49.4 overs)
David Warner 122 (113); Jasprit Bumrah 2/40 (10 overs)		Manish Pandey 104* (81); John Hastings 3/61 (10 overs)

India won by 6 wickets
Sydney Cricket Ground, Sydney
Umpires: Richard Kettleborough (Eng) and Paul Wilson (Aus)
Player of the match: Manish Pandey (Ind)

- India won the toss and elected to field.
- Jasprit Bumrah (Ind) made his ODI debut.
- Mitchell Marsh (Aus) and Manish Pandey (Ind) both scored their maiden ODI centuries.
- This was the highest successful ODI run chase by any visiting team against Australia in Australia.
- This loss ended Australia's streak of the most consecutive ODI wins at home (18).

== T20I series ==
=== 1st T20I ===
26 January
19:10 (D/N)
Scorecard

India; 3/188 (20 overs)	v	Australia; 151 (19.3 overs)
Virat Kohli 90* (55); Shane Watson 2/24 (4 overs)		Aaron Finch 44 (33); Jasprit Bumrah 3/23 (3.3 overs)

India won by 37 runs
Adelaide Oval, Adelaide
Umpires: Simon Fry (Aus) and John Ward (Aus)
Player of the match: Virat Kohli (Ind)

- Australia won the toss and elected to field.
- Travis Head (Aus), Jasprit Bumrah and Hardik Pandya (both Ind) made their T20I debuts.
- Suresh Raina (Ind) passed 1,000 runs in T20I matches.
- Suresh Raina and Virat Kohli's 134-run partnership was the highest 3rd wicket partnership and third highest overall for India in T20Is.

=== 2nd T20I ===
29 January
19:40 (D/N)
Scorecard

India; 3/184 (20 overs)	v	Australia; 8/157 (20 overs)
Rohit Sharma 60 (47); Glenn Maxwell 1/17 (2 overs)		Aaron Finch 74 (48); Ravindra Jadeja 2/32 (4 overs)

India won by 27 runs
Melbourne Cricket Ground, Melbourne
Umpires: Simon Fry (Aus) and Paul Wilson (Aus)
Player of the match: Virat Kohli (Ind)

- Australia won the toss and elected to field.
- Scott Boland, Nathan Lyon and Andrew Tye (all Aus) made their T20I debuts.
- MS Dhoni (Ind) set a new career record for the most stumpings in international matches with 140.

=== 3rd T20I ===
31 January
19:40 (D/N)
Scorecard

Australia; 5/197 (20 overs)	v	India; 3/200 (20 overs)
Shane Watson 124* (71); Yuvraj Singh 1/19 (2 overs)		Rohit Sharma 52 (38); Cameron Boyce 2/28 (4 overs)

India won by 7 wickets
Sydney Cricket Ground, Sydney
Umpires: Simon Fry (Aus) and John Ward (Aus)
Player of the match: Shane Watson (Aus)

- Australia won the toss and elected to bat.
- Cameron Bancroft and Usman Khawaja (both Aus) made their T20I debuts.
- Shane Watson's 124 not out is the highest score in T20Is in Australia and the second-highest overall.
- Mentalist Lior Suchard correctly predicted the score of this match.
