= 2021–22 Ashes series =

Cricket tour

- Part of English cricket team in Australia in 2021–22
- The Vodafone Ashes Series 2021–22 logo
- Date: 8 December 2021 – 18 January 2022
- Location: Australia
- Result: Australia won the five-match series 4–0 (1 draw)
- Player of the series: Compton–Miller Medal: Travis Head (Aus)
Teams
- Australia: England
Captains
- Pat Cummins (Note: Steve Smith captained Australia for the second Test.): Joe Root
Most runs
- Travis Head (357) Marnus Labuschagne (335) David Warner (273): Joe Root (322); Dawid Malan (244); Ben Stokes (236)
Most wickets
- Pat Cummins (21) Mitchell Starc (19) Scott Boland (18): Mark Wood (17); Stuart Broad (13); Ollie Robinson (11)

The 2021–22 Ashes series, named the Vodafone Men's Ashes Series for sponsorship reasons, was a series of five Test cricket matches that were contested between England and Australia for The Ashes. The series was played at five venues across Australia from 8 December 2021 and was scheduled to finish on 18 January 2022.

Australia were the defending holders of the Ashes going into the series, having won in 2017–18 and drawn in 2019. The series was part of the 2021–2023 ICC World Test Championship.

Australia won the series 4–0, retaining The Ashes after winning the first three Test matches. While the fourth Test ended in a draw, Australia comfortably won the fifth Test. England only averaged 19.18 with the bat across the series - their lowest in an Ashes series since 1890.

== Squads ==
Australia	England
~~Tim Paine (c, wk)~~; Pat Cummins (c); Steve Smith (vc); Scott Boland; Alex Carey (wk); Cameron Green; Marcus Harris; Josh Hazlewood; Travis Head; Josh Inglis (wk); Usman Khawaja; Marnus Labuschagne; Nathan Lyon; Nic Maddinson; Mitchell Marsh; Michael Neser; Jhye Richardson; Mitchell Starc; Mitchell Swepson; David Warner	Joe Root (c); Jos Buttler (vc, wk) (Note: Buttler was named vice-captain in the initial squad announcement, made before Stokes was added to the touring party. During the tour, Stokes was reported to be the incumbent (a position he had previously held), and he took charge of the team whilst Root was off the field, though no formal announcement of any change was made.); Ben Stokes (vc); James Anderson; Jonny Bairstow; Dom Bess; Sam Billings (wk); Stuart Broad; Rory Burns; Zak Crawley; Haseeb Hameed; Dan Lawrence; Jack Leach; Dawid Malan; Craig Overton; Ollie Pope; Ollie Robinson; Chris Woakes; Mark Wood

On 25 October 2021, Ben Stokes was added to England's squad. On 7 December 2021, James Anderson was left out of the first Test as a precaution, despite being declared fit to play. On 7 January 2022, Sam Billings was added to the squad as injury cover. Jos Buttler was ruled out of England's squad for the fifth Test, after breaking a finger during the fourth Test.

On 17 November 2021, Cricket Australia named a 15-member squad for the first two Test matches. On 19 November 2021, Tim Paine resigned from the captaincy role and, on 26 November 2021, was replaced by Pat Cummins as captain with Steve Smith as Cummins' deputy. Paine then withdrew from the squad and announced he was taking an indefinite leave of absence from cricket. On 2 December 2021, Alex Carey was added to Australia's squad as Paine's replacement and a wicket-keeper, receiving his maiden Test call-up in the process. Ahead of the second Test, Josh Hazlewood was ruled out of Australia's squad due to a side strain picked up during the first Test of the series. Pat Cummins was ruled out of the second Test after being named as a close contact of a positive COVID-19 case; Steve Smith was made captain, and Michael Neser made his Test debut for Australia. During the fifth day of the second Test, Cricket Australia named an unchanged squad for the rest of the series. Ahead of the third Test, Australia also added Scott Boland to their squad as a cover for their fast bowlers.

== COVID-19 impact ==
The 2021–22 Ashes series took place against the backdrop of the ongoing COVID-19 pandemic, which threatened to derail the series numerous times. As far back as June 2021, concerns had been raised that key England players could pull out of the tour if their families were not able to accompany them due to the Australian government's restrictions on international travel.

On the morning of the first day of the second Test, Australian captain Pat Cummins was ruled out of the match after he was deemed to be a close contact of someone with COVID-19. In mid-December, a number of people at the match at Adelaide Oval tested positive, including members of the media.

On 31 December 2021, Travis Head was ruled out of the fourth Test due to contracting COVID-19. Mitchell Marsh, Nic Maddinson and Josh Inglis were added to the squad as additional cover. Several key staff and officials, including ICC match referee David Boon and England coach Chris Silverwood were also forced to miss the fourth Test; Boon had tested positive for COVID-19 while Silverwood was forced to isolate with his family following an outbreak of the virus in the England camp.

== Venues ==
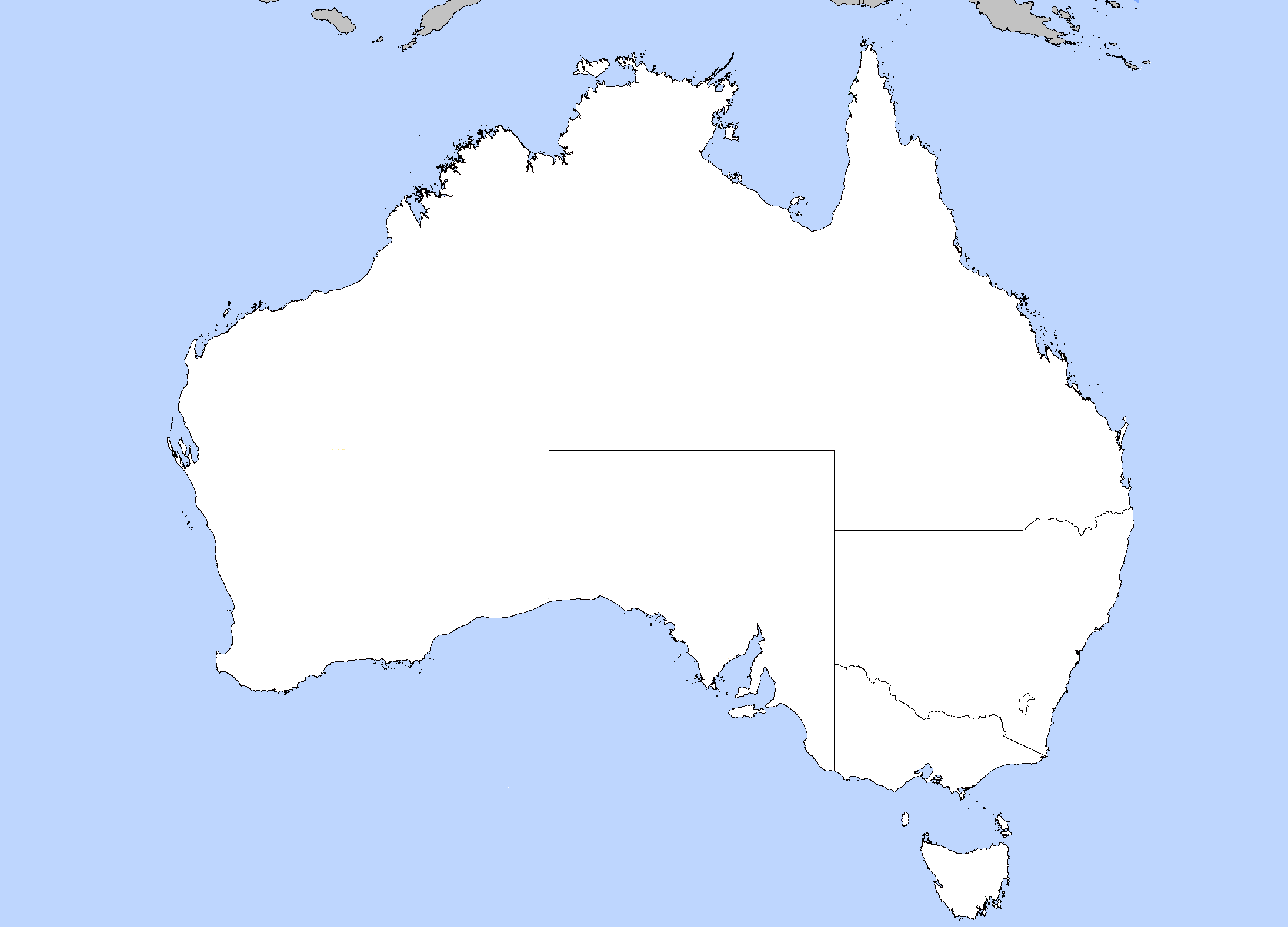

In May 2021, Cricket Australia (CA) announced that The Gabba, the Adelaide Oval, the Melbourne Cricket Ground (MCG), the Sydney Cricket Ground and the Perth Stadium would host the Test matches. However, in late November 2021, doubts were raised about the final Test taking place in Perth due to COVID-19 restrictions. Mark McGowan, the premier of Western Australia, insisted on a 14-day quarantine period for everyone travelling into the state. On 6 December 2021, CA confirmed the fifth Test would not be held in Perth, and that the relocated Test would be played as a day/night match. On 11 December 2021, CA confirmed that the venue for the fifth Test match would be the Bellerive Oval, in Hobart. This was the first ever Ashes Test match to be played in Hobart.

== Matches ==
=== First Test ===
8–12 December 2021 (Note: While five days of play were scheduled for each Test, the first Test reached a result in four days, and the third and fifth Tests reached a result in three days.)
Scorecard

England	v	Australia
147 (50.1 overs); Jos Buttler 39 (58); Pat Cummins 5/38 (13.1 overs)		425 (104.3 overs); Travis Head 152 (148); Ollie Robinson 3/58 (23 overs)
297 (103 overs); Joe Root 89 (165); Nathan Lyon 4/91 (34 overs)		1/20 (5.1 overs); Marcus Harris 9* (10); Ollie Robinson 1/13 (3 overs)

Australia won by 9 wickets
The Gabba, Brisbane
Umpires: Paul Reiffel (Aus) and Rod Tucker (Aus)
Player of the match: Travis Head (Aus)

- England won the toss and elected to bat.
- No play was possible after tea on day 1 due to rain.
- Alex Carey (Aus) made his Test debut.
- Travis Head scored a century off 85 balls, the fastest Test century at the Gabba.
- Nathan Lyon (Aus) took his 400th wicket in Tests.
- Alex Carey (Aus) took the most catches, (8), by a wicketkeeper on debut.
- World Test Championship points: Australia 12, England –8. (Note: England were deducted eight WTC points for a slow over-rate while bowling.)

==== Day one ====
Rory Burns was bowled for a golden duck by Mitchell Starc off the first ball of the series. Dawid Malan was caught behind by Alex Carey from a delivery by Josh Hazlewood. Captain Joe Root followed with a duck after getting caught at first slip by David Warner from a delivery by Hazlewood. Ben Stokes was only able to score five runs before being caught out off a delivery by Pat Cummins. Ultimately, England was dismissed for 147 in their first innings. Although England was all out before tea, Australia were unable to begin their first innings due to weather.

==== Day two ====
Marcus Harris was only able to score three runs before being dismissed by Ollie Robinson. Marnus Labuschagne and David Warner then put on a partnership of 156 for the second wicket, before Labuschagne, Steve Smith, Warner, and Cameron Green were dismissed in quick succession, losing 4 wickets for 29 runs to leave Australia 5/195. England were unable to capitalise on three close opportunities to dismiss David Warner on 17, 48, and 60. Warner was able to score 94 runs before being caught out off a delivery by Robinson. Green was bowled out by Robinson first ball. Australia ended the day 7/343, with Travis Head not out on 112 runs with twelve fours and two sixes, and Mitchell Starc not out on 10 runs.

==== Day three ====
Australia were all out before lunch, with Travis Head bowled out off a yorker from Mark Wood. Australia's run total for the innings was 425, with Head contributing 152. Haseeb Hameed and Rory Burns were the first two batsmen for England's second innings. Burns was called out lbw with zero runs, but the call was overturned by DRS. Burns was later dismissed for 13 and Hameed soon followed, being dismissed for 27. The next two batsmen, Dawid Malan and Joe Root, ended the day not out with 80 and 86 runs, respectively. As a result, England ended the day trailing Australia by 58 runs.

==== Day four ====
Despite strong performances in day three, Malan and Root were only able to add two and three runs on day four before falling. Ollie Pope was the next to fall after being caught at the slip. The global broadcast from The Gabba was then cut off for approximately 30 minutes while the Test continued. After the broadcast was able to return, Stokes edged a ball from Pat Cummins and was caught out in the gully, leaving England 6/266. The next four batsmen, Jos Buttler, Chris Woakes, Ollie Robinson, and Mark Wood, were dismissed in quick succession, ending the innings. In total, England scored 297 with eight wickets and only 77 runs in day four.

With a target of 20 runs, Australia opened their second innings with Alex Carey and Marcus Harris. Carey was dismissed, but Harris was able to reach the target score before Australia's third batsman faced a ball.

=== Second Test ===
16–20 December 2021 (D/N)
Scorecard

Australia	v	England
9/473d (150.4 overs); Marnus Labuschagne 103 (305); Ben Stokes 3/113 (25 overs)		236 (84.1 overs); Dawid Malan 80 (157); Mitchell Starc 4/37 (16.1 overs)
9/230d (61 overs); Travis Head 51 (54); Joe Root 2/27 (6 overs)		192 (113.1 overs); Chris Woakes 44 (97); Jhye Richardson 5/42 (19.1 overs)

Australia won by 275 runs
Adelaide Oval, Adelaide
Umpires: Rod Tucker (Aus) and Paul Wilson (Aus)
Player of the match: Marnus Labuschagne (Aus)

- Australia won the toss and elected to bat.
- Michael Neser (Aus) made his Test debut.
- Stuart Broad (Eng) played in his 150th Test.
- Jhye Richardson (Aus) took his first five-wicket haul in Tests.
- Marnus Labuschagne (Aus) scored his sixth Test century, and first against England.
- World Test Championship points: Australia 12, England 0.

==== Day one ====
Despite testing negative to COVID-19, Pat Cummins was forced to withdraw from the match and isolate in accordance with the South Australian government's public health regulations. Steve Smith was appointed Australian captain for the first time since his comeback from the Sandpapergate incident, while Michael Neser was named as Cummins' replacement and hastily awarded his baggy green.

Smith won the toss and decided to bat first. Marcus Harris and David Warner opened the batting for the home team. However, Harris was out soon, caught by England wicketkeeper Jos Buttler off the bowling of Stuart Broad. Marnus Labuschagne and Warner stabilized the innings putting on a partnership of 172 runs for the second wicket before Warner was out for 95, falling five short of a century, caught by Broad off the bowling of Ben Stokes. Australia ended the day at 225 for two, with Labuschagne remaining not out at 95 (having been dropped twice by Buttler on 21 and 95) and Smith on 18 not out.

==== Day two ====
Early in the day, Labuschagne reached his sixth test hundred with a controlled edge past second slip to the boundary. Having come off 287 balls, it was the slowest Test century by an Australian since Jason Gillespie's effort against Bangladesh in 2006. He was dismissed LBW shortly afterward on 103 by Ollie Robinson, offering no shot to a delivery. Australia reviewed the decision, however, the decision by the on-field umpire stayed. Travis Head joined the captain Smith at the wicket and the duo put on fifty runs for the fourth wicket before Head was bowled off a full toss from the bowling of English captain Joe Root. Cameron Green came to the crease but was back to the pavilion adding only two runs. Australia were at 294 for five. Wicketkeeper Alex Carey joined Smith to put on 91 runs for the sixth wicket before Smith was out leg before to James Anderson for 93. Australia reviewed the decision but the on-field umpire's decision stayed as an 'umpire's call'. Carey brought up his fifty before being out for 51 caught at cover by Haseeb Hameed off the bowling of Anderson. Australia brought up their 450 before declaring for 473 at the loss of 9 wickets.

England opened their innings with Hameed and Rory Burns, both of whom were out for single digit scores bringing England to a total of 12 runs for the loss of two wickets. Hameed was out for 6 runs caught at mid-on by Mitchell Starc off the bowling of Michael Neser, while Burns was out for 4 runs caught by Smith at second slip off the bowling of Starc. England ended the day at 17 for two with Dawid Malan remaining not out at one and Joe Root remaining not out at 5.

==== Day three ====
Malan and Root resumed from their overnight positions and carried their bats through the first session with England getting to lunch at 140 runs for the loss of no additional wickets. Malan was unbeaten at 58 while Root was unbeaten at 40. Root was the first to be dismissed for 62 runs out caught by Smith at first slip off the bowling of Green. England were 150 for the loss of three wickets. Malan followed soon with the team adding 7 runs before Malan was out for 80 runs caught by Smith again at first slip off the bowling of Starc. England lost their next six wickets within 79 runs folding for a total of 236 runs. For the Australians Starc took four wickets conceding 37 runs, while spinner Nathan Lyon took three wickets conceding 58 runs.

Australia chose not to enforce the follow-on and ended the day 45 for one, with Warner run-out in a mixup with batsman Harris, with a combination of Broad and Buttler dislodging the stumps. Harris remained unbeaten at 21 while Neser was not out having scored two runs.

==== Day four ====
England took the field without Root, who was being treated for a lower abdominal injury sustained in the warm up session. Stokes took over as captain during Root's brief absence. Despite this setback, England started the day well, dismissing Neser, Harris and then the captain Smith in quick succession to have Australia 55 for four. But then Robinson, who had taken two of the day's wickets, switched from seam bowling to off-spin, presumably to lift the over rate. Root returned soon afterwards to the field, but by that time Australia had steadied, Head having combined with Labuschagne and helping Australia end the first session 134 for four, leading by 371 runs.

Head was first to depart when play resumed, caught by Stokes at deep square leg off Robinson; his 51 had come off only 54 deliveries. Labuschagne also reached a half-century to back up his mighty first-innings effort before departing, also for 51, caught by Stokes (this time fielding at deep mid wicket) off the part-time leg spin of Malan, his first test wicket. Although wickets continued to fall at regular intervals, the remaining batters continued to add runs and when Smith declared at 230 for nine after Richardson had been dismissed, England had been set a winning target of 468 in the remaining four sessions.

England resumed their second innings chasing a target of 468 runs and were immediately down a wicket when Hameed was out for a duck caught by the wicketkeeper Carey off the bowling of Jhye Richardson. Malan joined Burns and the duo put on 44 runs before Malan was out for 20 runs leg before to Neser. Burns and Root followed soon after with England ending the day at 82 runs for the loss of four wickets.

==== Day five ====
Chasing a stiff target, England were at 142 runs for six wickets at lunch with Buttler at 16 and Chris Woakes at 28. The duo added 61 runs for the seventh wicket before Woakes was out for 44 runs out, bowled Richardson. Buttler, having faced 207 deliveries, trod on his stumps trying to work a cut behind square; his was the ninth wicket and England were all out for 192. Australia won the game by 275 runs, going 2–0 up in the five-match series. Labuschagne was named player of the match for his century in the first innings and half century in the second innings, while Richardson was the pick of the bowlers, taking five wickets for 42 runs.

=== Third Test ===
26–30 December 2021
Scorecard

England	v	Australia
185 (65.1 overs); Joe Root 50 (82); Nathan Lyon 3/36 (14.1 overs)		267 (87.5 overs); Marcus Harris 76 (189); James Anderson 4/33 (23 overs)
68 (27.4 overs); Joe Root 28 (59); Scott Boland 6/7 (4 overs)

Australia won by an innings and 14 runs
Melbourne Cricket Ground, Melbourne
Umpires: Paul Reiffel (Aus) and Paul Wilson (Aus)
Player of the match: Scott Boland (Aus)

- Australia won the toss and elected to field.
- Scott Boland (Aus) made his Test debut.
- Scott Boland (Aus) took his first five-wicket haul in Tests.
- Australia retained the Ashes as a result of this match.
- World Test Championship points: Australia 12, England 0.

==== Day one ====
England made four changes to its team, with Jonny Bairstow, Zak Crawley, Jack Leach and Mark Wood replacing Stuart Broad, Rory Burns, Ollie Pope and Chris Woakes. Australia also made some changes, with Jhye Richardson and Michael Neser making way for Pat Cummins returning as captain, and debutant Scott Boland, a local boy who became only the fourth Indigenous Australian cricketer to play at Test level. After the start of play was delayed by rain, England's batting woes at the top of the order continued, with Cummins having dismissed openers Hameed and Crawley with only 13 runs on the board. It was yet again up to Root and Malan to rescue the innings, and the pair added 48 runs before Malan lost his wicket on the last ball before lunch, caught in the slips by Warner off Cummins for 14. England's score was 61 for three.

England found themselves in trouble early in the Test after being bowled out for 185 runs.

Warner and Harris gave Australia its best start of the series, combining for an opening stand of 57 in 14 overs before Warner fell for a brisk 38 (off 42 balls) when a thick edge off Anderson was caught by Crawley at gully. Lyon was sent in as nightwatchman for the remaining two overs as Australia ended the day's play at 61 for one.

==== Day two ====
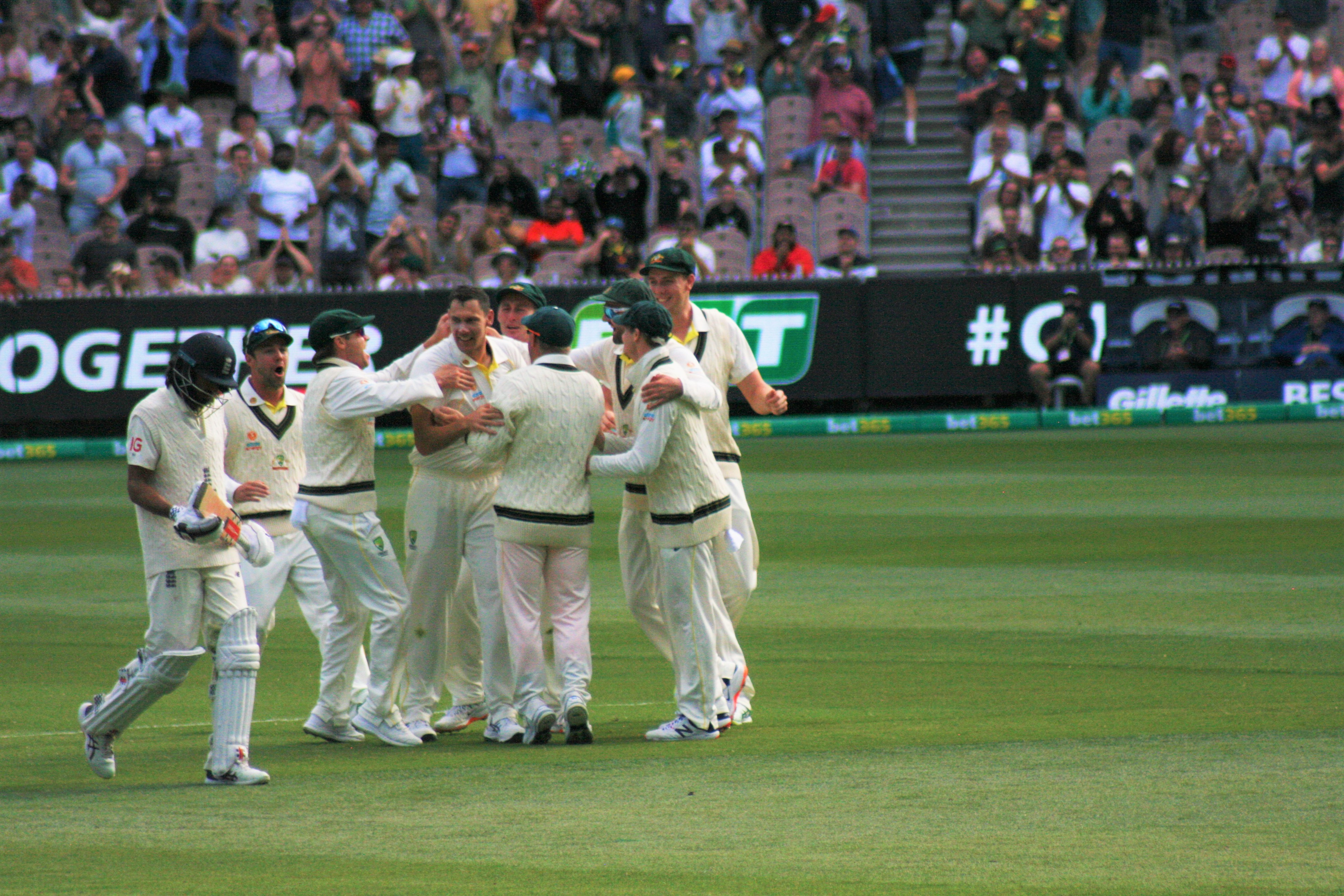
Boland dismisses Haseeb Hameed, day 2 of the third test

The start of the second day was delayed by half an hour after it was revealed that four non-playing members of the England squad – two support staff and two family members – had tested positive to COVID-19. Australia increased their run total to 267 before being bowled out. Anderson claimed three more wickets to bring his total to 4/33 in the first innings.

England once again found themselves in trouble early in the innings. Mitchell Starc dismissed Zak Crawley and Dawid Malan on consecutive deliveries in the fifth over. In the eleventh over, Scott Boland dismissed Haseeb Hameed and Jack Leach in three balls. Day two ended with England 4/31 and trailing Australia by 51 runs.

==== Day three ====
In the fifth over of the day, Starc bowled Ben Stokes out with England at 5/46. Boland dismissed the next four batsmen (Jonny Bairstow, Joe Root, Mark Wood, and Ollie Robinson) with ducks from Wood and Robinson. Cameron Green bowled James Anderson out to end the Test with Australia winning by an innings and 14 runs. England's score of 68 runs was their lowest innings score on Australian soil since 1904; their previous lowest had also come at the MCG.

Boland earned the Mullagh Medal after taking six wickets for seven runs during England's second innings.

=== Fourth Test ===
5–9 January 2022
Scorecard

Australia	v	England
8/416d (134 overs); Usman Khawaja 137 (260); Stuart Broad 5/101 (29 overs)		294 (79.1 overs); Jonny Bairstow 113 (158); Scott Boland 4/36 (14.1 overs)
6/265d (68.5 overs); Usman Khawaja 101* (138); Jack Leach 4/84 (21.5 overs)		9/270 (102 overs); Zak Crawley 77 (100); Scott Boland 3/30 (24 overs)

Match drawn
Sydney Cricket Ground, Sydney
Umpires: Paul Reiffel (Aus) and Rod Tucker (Aus)
Player of the match: Usman Khawaja (Aus)

- Australia won the toss and elected to bat.
- Only 46.5 overs of play was possible on day 1 due to rain.
- World Test Championship points: Australia 4, England 4.

==== Day one ====
Earlier, Travis Head was ruled out of the fourth Test due to contracting COVID-19. Thus, Usman Khawaja replaced Head in the Australian playing 11 and he was the only change in Australian side. England made one change with Stuart Broad replacing Ollie Robinson. Usman Khawaja was playing his first test match in more than 2 years. Only 46.5 overs of play was possible due to frequent rain interruption. Australian opening pair built a 50 run partnership before Broad dismissed Warner for 30. Anderson and Wood chipped in with a wicket each as well, and Australia ended the day with 3/126 with Khawaja (4*) and Smith (6*) on strike.

==== Day two ====
Khawaja and Smith continued to pile up runs and built a century partnership with Smith scoring Half-century. Then, Broad provided the breakthrough for English with dismissing Smith for 67 and breaking the 115-run stand. Usman Khawaja then went on to score his 9th test century on his comeback test . Handy contributions from Pat Cummins, Starc and Lyon down the order ensured that Aussies total crossed 400. Cummins declared the innings on 8/416 for 134 overs in the final session of play and put England to bat for 5 overs in the day. Stuart Broad registered a five- wicket haul (5/101). England ended day 2 unscathed with scoring 0/13 in 5 overs, in which 9 runs came as extras.

==== Day three ====
Day three of SCG test was observed as Jane McGrath day to create awareness about Breast cancer and to raise funds for McGrath foundation. Starc broke the opening partnership early on the day and then other pacers joined the party and made England reeling at 4/36 on Lunch with England losing 3 wickets for no run in a space of 6 overs. Then Stokes and Bairstow joined forces to perform the rescue act by stitching a 128 run partnership before Nathan Lyon trapped Stokes (66) LBW to break the partnership. Buttler departed soon without troubling the scoreboard. Meanwhile, Bairstow at other end stitched a quickfire 72 run partnership with Mark wood, before Wood departed on 39. Johnny Bairstow then went on to reach triple digit figures in just 138 balls and he became the first England player to score century in this series. England ended the day with 7/258 on board in 70 overs.

==== Day four ====
Australia took only 9 overs to wipe out the English tail to bundle out English at 294 with Boland and Lyon taking the last 3 wickets. Australia began their second innings and Ollie Pope kept the wickets for England instead of Bairstow. Australia lost Warner early followed by Harris, Labuschagne and Smith who all were dismissed for 20 - odd runs. Australia found themselves in trouble after they were reduced to 4/86. Cameron Green and Usman Khawaja rebuilt the innings by stitching a mammoth 179 run partnership, with Green scoring 74 and Khawaja going on to score another century in his comeback match to extend Australia's lead by 387, before Cummins declared the innings at 5/268 and set England a target of 388. English openers Crawley and Hameed ensured that English didn't lose any wickets by batting out the 11 overs, and ended the day with 0/30. All 4 results were still possible with England needing 358 to win and Australia needing 10 wickets to win.

==== Day five ====
Boland struck early in the day to break the 46 run opening partnership while Crawley would later go on the register his first half-century in the Ashes. Malan departed for 4 runs followed by Crawley who made 77 runs. Root and Stokes put on a 60 run partnership, but Root was soon bowled by Boland for 24 runs. England reached the tea break at 174/4 with Bairstow and Stokes at the crease, Stokes scoring a half-century. With 36 overs of play in the final session, a draw seemed the most likely result, but Nathan Lyon dismissed Stokes and opened the door for Australia. Cummins later took two wickets in the space of three balls, leaving only three wickets to win in the last 17 overs. Boland would soon dismiss Bairstow for 41 and Australia were just two wickets away. Meanwhile, poor light forced Australia to operate spinners Lyon and Smith from both ends. The 9th wicket partnership batted for almost nine overs before Smith dismissed Leach, his first test wicket since 2016. By that stage, two overs of play remained. Anderson and Broad batted out the last two overs to ensure that the match ended in a draw. Khawaja was named player of the match for his twin centuries in the match.

=== Fifth Test ===
14–18 January 2022 (D/N)
Scorecard

Australia	v	England
303 (75.4 overs); Travis Head 101 (113); Stuart Broad 3/59 (24.4 overs)		188 (47.4 overs); Chris Woakes 36 (48); Pat Cummins 4/45 (13.4 overs)
155 (56.3 overs); Alex Carey 49 (88); Mark Wood 6/37 (16.3 overs)		124 (38.5 overs); Zak Crawley 36 (66); Scott Boland 3/18 (12 overs)

Australia won by 146 runs
Bellerive Oval, Hobart
Umpires: Rod Tucker (Aus) and Paul Wilson (Aus)
Player of the match: Travis Head (Aus)

- England won the toss and elected to field.
- Only 59.3 overs of play was possible on day 1 due to rain.
- Sam Billings (Eng) made his Test debut.
- World Test Championship points: Australia 12, England 0.

The final Test of the series was the first Ashes Test ever to be held in Hobart, and the first Test match to be held in Tasmania since 2016. It was also the first day/night Test at the Bellerive Oval, and made 2021/22 the first Ashes series in Australia without a Test in Perth since 1965/66. Travis Head returned in place of Marcus Harris; Usman Khawaja went up the order to open the batting, the first time he had done so in a Test in almost three years. England made five changes from the side that drawn the fourth Test; Rory Burns replaced Haseeb Hameed; Jonny Bairstow and Jos Buttler, both injured, were replaced by Ollie Pope and Sam Billings respectively, the latter making his debut as England's Test cap no. 700; and Chris Woakes and Ollie Robinson replaced Jack Leach and James Anderson.

==== Day one ====
Australia struggled with the bat in seaming conditions, slipping to 3/12 and then 4/83 with ducks for both David Warner (off 22 balls) and Steven Smith (off 2 balls). Travis Head and Cameron Green then combined for a rapid partnership of 121 in 26.4 overs, Head reaching his fifty off 53 deliveries before cutting behind backward point for his second century of the series, and the first Ashes hundred scored at Hobart. He was out the ball after reaching his milestone to Chris Woakes; Green reached his fourth Test match fifty before falling for 74 less than two overs before rain forced an early close. By the end of the shortened first day Australia were 6/241.

==== Day two ====
Mark Wood dismissed Mitchell Starc and Pat Cummins with the short ball early on the second day; Nathan Lyon hit three sixes off his first nine deliveries before Woakes bowled Carey off an inside-edge for 24. Lyon and Scott Boland added 23 runs for the final wicket before Lyon was bowled for 31 off 24 deliveries, leaving Australia 301 all out; in total on the second day they had scored 62 runs for the loss of their final four wickets. Broad ended with innings figures of 3-59 and Wood with 3-115, the latter having conceded runs at a rate of more than six an over.

Rory Burns was run out by Marnus Labuschagne for his second duck of the series as England replied to Australia's total. Seven of the next eight England batters reached double figures but only two got past 30 as Australia took regular wickets, leaving England 3/78 and 4/81 when Cummins removed Dawid Malan for 25 and Joe Root for 34; the latter was the eighth occasion on which Cummins had dismissed Joe Root in Tests. Ben Stokes fell to Mitchell Starc for 4 and England were left 6/110 when Ollie Pope edged behind off Boland for 14. Billings and Woakes provided lower-order resistance, the latter top-scoring for the innings with 36, but Cummins and Starc returned to take the final four wickets in the space of six overs to leave England all out for 188 in 47.4 overs, a deficit of 115 runs. Cummins finished with 4-45, and Starc with 3-53.

David Warner fell in the first over of Australia's second innings to complete his second pair in Tests, before Woakes gave Sam Billings his first Test dismissal when Labuschagne edged behind for 5. Mark Wood then took the next four wickets to fall, across the second and third days; the first was Khawaja, who gloved a bouncer behind to the wicket-keeper. Scott Boland, as nightwatchman, batted through the final five overs of the day with Steve Smith. Stumps were called with Australia 3/37, leading by 152.

==== Day three ====
Mark Wood continued to take wickets with the short ball the next morning; Boland edged behind before Head (8) and Smith (27) fell to bouncers. From 6/63 Cameron Green played his part in another Australian recovery, this time in partnership with Alex Carey, who survived being bowled off by Chris Woakes off a no-ball when on 19*. Green fell to Stuart Broad before Mitchell Starc provided Wood with his fifth wicket, and his third five-wicket haul in Tests; Carey added 30 in partnership with his captain before falling to Broad for 49, and Wood removed Cummins for his ninth wicket in the match to bowl Australia out for 155. England were set 271 to chase for their first victory in Australia for eleven years; Australia needed ten wickets to claim the series 4-0 and record their first Test victory in Tasmania for more than six years.

Zak Crawley and Rory Burns made the highest opening partnership of the series for either side, adding 68 before Cameron Green broke through in the final over of the day's second session with the wicket of Burns. England were 1/81 until Dawid Malan was dismissed, also by Green; this sparked a collapse in which England lost their final nine wickets for 42 runs in 18 overs. Crawley top-scored in the innings but was Green's third victim for 36; Cummins and Boland then matched the all-rounder's wicket-tally with 3-42 and 3-18 respectively. Australia wrapped up their victory by 146 runs in less than three days; the 39 wickets to fall to pace bowlers in this match were the most in an Ashes Test, and the most in any Test in Australia. This was also, in terms of balls, the second-shortest Test in Australia in which all forty wickets had fallen.

At approximately 6am on the morning following the conclusion of the 5th Test, Tasmania Police attended the Hobart's Crowne Plaza Hotel following reports of intoxicated people in a public lobby. The incident followed a noise complaint by a guest staying at the hotel; social media footage originally taken by an England assistant coach showed five of the cricketers who had played in the Test. Those in question left the area when asked, and police took no further action.

== Statistics ==
=== Leading runscorers ===
Name	Innings	Not Outs	Runs	H / S	Average	100s	50s	S / R
(Australia) Travis Head	6	0	357	152	59.50	2	1	86.02
(Australia) Marnus Labuschagne	9	1	335	103	41.87	1	2	48.06
(England) Joe Root	10	0	322	89	32.20		3	48.27
(Australia) David Warner	8	0	273	95	34.12		2	50.74
(Australia) Usman Khawaja	4	1	255	137	85.00	2		55.19

Abbreviations: H / S – Highest score in an innings; S / R – Strike rate: runs per 100 balls faced

=== Leading wicket-takers ===
Name	Overs	Maidens	Runs	Wickets	Economy	Average
(Australia) Pat Cummins	126	31	379	21	3.01	18.05
(Australia) Mitchell Starc	152.1	32	482	19	3.17	25.37
(Australia) Scott Boland	81.1	31	172	18	2.12	9.56
(England) Mark Wood	120.3	15	453	17	3.76	26.65
(Australia) Nathan Lyon	163.1	47	377	16	2.31	23.56

== Broadcasting ==
The series was broadcast on television in Australia by the Seven Network and Fox Sports. BT Sport televised the series in the United Kingdom and Ireland.

== In popular culture ==
The second season of the Australian docu-series - The Test was produced, following the Australian national cricket team in the aftermath of the resignation of Tim Paine as Test captain. The first and second episodes of Season 2 featured Australia playing the five tests against England.
