= Scott Boland =

Australian cricketer (born 1989)

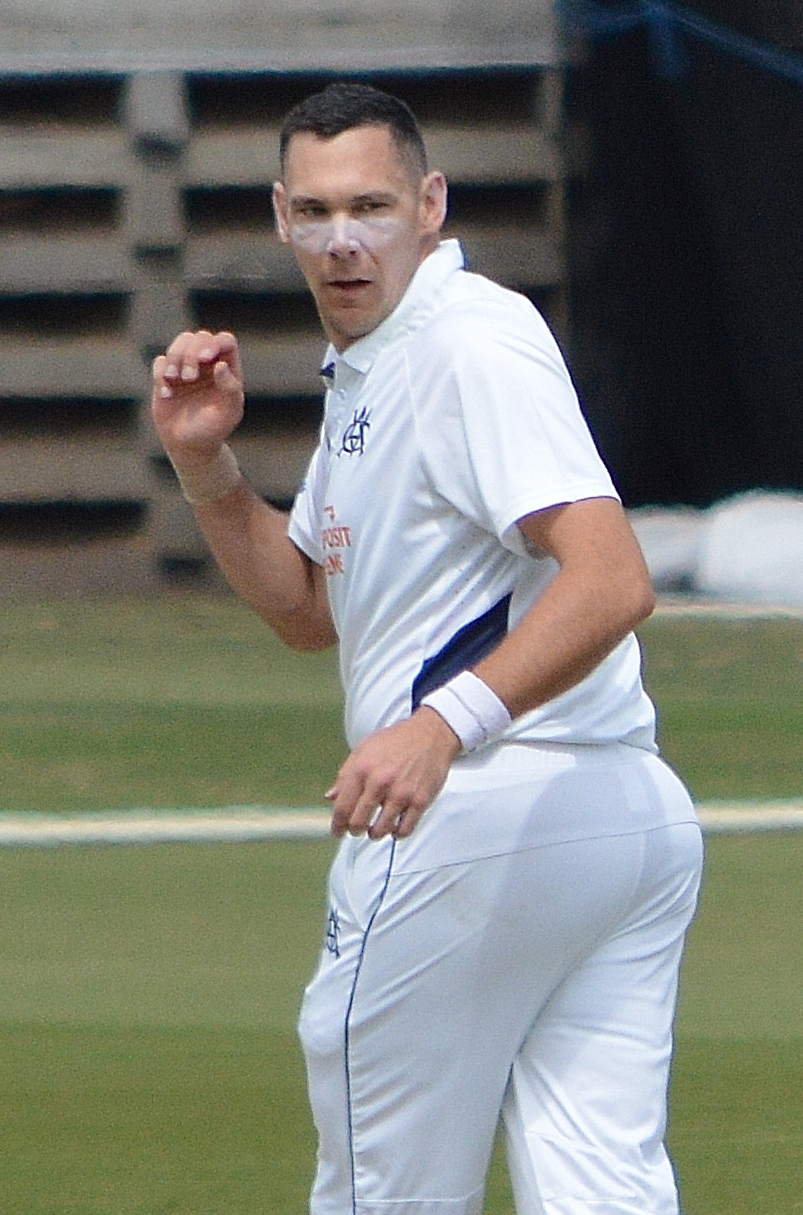
- Boland playing First Class cricket with Victoria in October 2025

Personal information
- Full name: Scott Michael Boland
- Born: 11 April 1989 (age 37); Mordialloc, Victoria, Australia
- Nickname: Scotty, Barrel, Bolo
- Height: 189 cm (6 ft 2 in)
- Batting: Right-handed
- Bowling: Right-arm fast-medium
- Role: Bowler

International information
- National side: Australia (2016–present)
- Test debut (cap 463): 26 December 2021 v England
- Last Test: 18 October 2026 v South Africa
- ODI debut (cap 210): 12 January 2016 v India
- Last ODI: 12 October 2016 v South Africa
- ODI shirt no.: 26
- T20I debut (cap 76): 29 January 2016 v India
- Last T20I: 6 September 2016 v Sri Lanka
- T20I shirt no.: 26

Domestic team information
- Years: Team
- 2011/12–present: Victoria (squad no. 24)
- 2013/14–2018/19: Melbourne Stars (squad no. 24)
- 2016: Rising Pune Supergiant
- 2019/20–2021/22: Hobart Hurricanes (squad no. 25)
- 2023/24–present: Melbourne Stars (squad no. 25)
- 2024: Durham

Career statistics
Competition	Test	ODI	FC	LA
Matches	20	14	125	70
Runs scored	167	9	1,138	137
Batting average	9.82	3.00	11.61	6.52
100s/50s	0/0	0/0	0/2	0/0
Top score	40	4	51	19
Balls bowled	3,365	716	24,058	3,679
Wickets	87	16	484	83
Bowling average	18.44	45.31	22.66	40.69
5 wickets in innings	3	0	14	1
10 wickets in match	1	0	2	0
Best bowling	6/7	3/67	7/31	5/63
Catches/stumpings	9/–	3/–	38/–	14/–
Medal record
Men's cricket
Representing Australia
ICC World Test Championship
Winner	2021–2023
Runner-up	2023–2025
- Source: ESPNcricinfo, 22 October 2026

Scott Michael Boland (born 11 April 1989) is an Australian international cricketer. A right-arm fast-medium bowler, he also plays domestically for Victoria and the Melbourne Stars. In March 2019, he was named the Sheffield Shield Player of the Year by Cricket Australia. Boland is one of a handful of Indigenous Australians to be selected to play for Australia at international level. He was a member of the Australian team that won the 2023 ICC World Test Championship final.

On 14 July 2025, in the third and final Test match of the Frank Worrell Trophy at Sabina Park in Jamaica, Boland became the 10th Australian cricketer and first ever Indigenous Australian to take a hat-trick in Test match cricket.

== Early career ==
Boland was born in Mordialloc, Victoria, and attended St John Vianney's Primary School, Parkdale and St Bede's College, Mentone. Starting his career with Parkdale Cricket Club, Boland first played a competitive game for the club aged six, in the under-12's competition. He then rose through the ranks of Parkdale Cricket Club, before joining Victorian Premier Cricket club Frankston Peninsula at age 16, to further his cricketing development. Upon leaving Parkdale, Boland had played 41 matches in total for the club, taking 31 wickets at an average of 12.35. It was moving to Frankston that prompted Boland to work more on his bowling, at the behest of then coach Nick Jewell. After moving, Boland's first two seasons were less productive, only playing six matches in first grade, with just three wickets. He fared much better in second grade, however, getting 37 wickets in the 2008/09 season, at an average of 18.60. His next season proved more fruitful, where he played 20 matches for first grade, taking 27 wickets at an average of 27. Another consistent season with Frankston-Peninsula saw Boland take 33 wickets at an average of 25.3 in the 2010/11 season, earning him a rookie state level contract with the Victorian team.

== Domestic career ==
Despite a strong start to the 2011/2012 season with Frankston-Peninsula, Boland was not called up to debut until Victoria's fourth Sheffield Shield game of the season, coming up against Western Australia, on 11 November 2011. In this game, he bowled 25 overs, taking a total of 2/92 across the two innings. Despite this modest return, he would play the next game, taking 4/87 for the match. He went on to make another appearance in the Sheffield Shield this season against South Australia, taking 3/89, finishing the season with 9 wickets at an average of 29.77.

In the 2012/13 season, Boland was not a regular member of the Sheffield Shield or Ryobi Cup squad, playing in seven of Victoria's games across both formats. In the Sheffield Shield, he took a total of 6 wickets across 5 innings, at an average of 41.83. His best figures this season came against South Australia at Adelaide Oval, where he took 3/30 in the fourth innings. These efforts were in vain, however, as South Australia went on to win by just 1 wicket. Boland fared better in the Ryobi Cup, finishing with he took 9 wickets at 27.11 for the tournament, and career best List A figures of 5/63, in another close loss against South Australia.

The 2013/14 season was much more productive for Boland, as he enjoyed an extended stay in Victoria's teams for both the Sheffield Shield and Ryobi Cup tournaments. Boland played 9 matches in the Shield this season, taking 19 wickets at an average of 37.73. He also took figures of 5/84 in loss against South Australia. It was in this season that Boland compiled his highest score in professional cricket, coming in as a nightwatchman for Victoria and scoring 51 off 212 deliveries.

The 2013/14 Ryobi Cup was somewhat of a breakthrough for Boland, he played 6 matches, taking 9 wickets at 33.33, and was Victoria's leading fast bowler during the tournament. His best figures of 3/42 came against New South Wales, his economical bowling crucial in restricting their total in a tight win.

The following season in 2014/15, Boland's performances were again consistent, and he was now a mainstay in the Victorian attack. He played every match of Victoria's Matador Cup campaign, claiming 9 wickets across the season at an average of 35.22, including defending 8 runs from the final over against New South Wales to win the game for the Victorian team. In the Sheffield Shield he played 8 games, including the final, taking 25 wickets at 30.12 along the way. His performances this season helped Victoria win their first Sheffield Shield title in 4 seasons. Amongst these performances was his first five-wicket haul in first-class cricket, taking 6/49. The 2015/16 season was a breakout season for Boland at both state and international level. Boland took a career-best 7/31 against Western Australia that got the attention of the national selectors, and he was added to the standby list for Australia's Test against the West Indies in Hobart. His performances across formats were strong, leading to an eventual selection to play for Australia against India in their tour of Australia in January 2016. At the end of the domestic season, he was awarded the Bill Lawry Medal as Victoria's best Sheffield Shield player, collecting 33 wickets at 20.93 on way to helping Victoria win another Sheffield Shield title. Boland took 7 wickets at 37.28 in the Matador Cup competition, another consistent season in the competition.

The 2017/18 season was another consistent season for Boland, as he claimed 38 wickets at 26.92 to finish the season as the 3rd highest wicket-taker, his best figures of 4/41 coming against South Australia, taking 8/129 for the match. Boland's was mainstay of Victoria's JLT One-Day cup, taking 6 wickets at 63.50 for the tournament.

The 2018/19 domestic season was another successful season for Boland. For Victoria in the Sheffield Shield Boland took 48 wickets, the most from Victoria, at a miserly average of 19.66. He took two 5 wickets hauls, taking 6/49 against New South Wales to bowl Victoria to an innings victory. He also took 7/54 in the first innings against South Australia to finish with figures of 9/102. These performances helped Boland on the way to claim the Sheffield Shield Player of the Season award. On 29 June 2023 Boland announced his return to the Melbourne Stars signing a three-year contract.

== International career ==
He made his Twenty20 International debut for Australia against India on 29 January 2016.

After consistent performances in the Ryobi Cup, Boland was selected in the ODI squad to take on India, in their tour of Australia. According to his state captain at the time, Matthew Wade, Boland was selected for his ability to bowl the final overs of the match, Wade saying: "He's worked really hard over the last 18 months to hone those skills and be a finisher. That's probably got him picked in the Australian team. His death stuff has been outstanding. He'll own that and he'll hopefully dominate that for us." He made his One Day International debut for Australia against India on 12 January 2016. He was selected to debut against India in the first match of the series, at the WACA ground. Boland went on to record figures of 0/74 off 10 overs, the worst figures by a debutant Australian bowler ever.

Notwithstanding this poor return on debut, Boland played for the rest of the series for Australia. He would pick up only 1 wicket across the other 4 games, conceding 259 runs in the process. His performances in the T20 internationals against India were also disappointing, playing in two of the three matches in this series, where he went wicket-less. Despite the poor return verses India, Boland was a mainstay in the Australian ODI team in 2016, playing all 14 of his ODI appearances this year.

He toured New Zealand with the Australian squad in February 2016, playing in the place of an injured Kane Richardson and recording figures of 2/61 and 2/59. Boland bowled well in the series, taking the crucial top order wickets throughout but it wasn't enough to win the series, Australia falling to a 2–1 series loss.

Boland's next international appearances came in a tri-series between West Indies, South Africa, and Australia in the West Indies. He was called into the squad after an injury to fellow Victorian John Hastings, and toured with the Australian squad, being named in the squad for two matches, one of which was cancelled due to weather. Boland played another, against the West Indies, where he took 2/69 from 10 overs, helping restrict the West Indies to 283, which Australia chased to win by six wickets.

His next run in the ODI team was in Australia's tour of Sri Lanka in July and August 2016, where Boland played in two of the five ODI matches on the tour, and one of the T20 internationals. In the ODI matches, he played twice, taking two wickets at 32, as Australia convincingly won the ODI series. In the T20 internationals Boland played in one match in the series fetching 3/26 from his four overs in the match, for his best T20 figures in his career.

In 2018, Boland was selected in the Aboriginal XI that toured England to celebrate the 150th anniversary of the 1868 Aboriginal team that traveled to England. His brother Nick was also in the squad of 13. The 1868 tour was the first time that an Australian sports team had represented the country overseas. Boland was a standout on the tour, with some commentators noting he was unplayable at times. Over the six matches he took five wickets at an average of 28.40 and was presented with the Taverners Australia Indigenous Cricketer of the Year award.

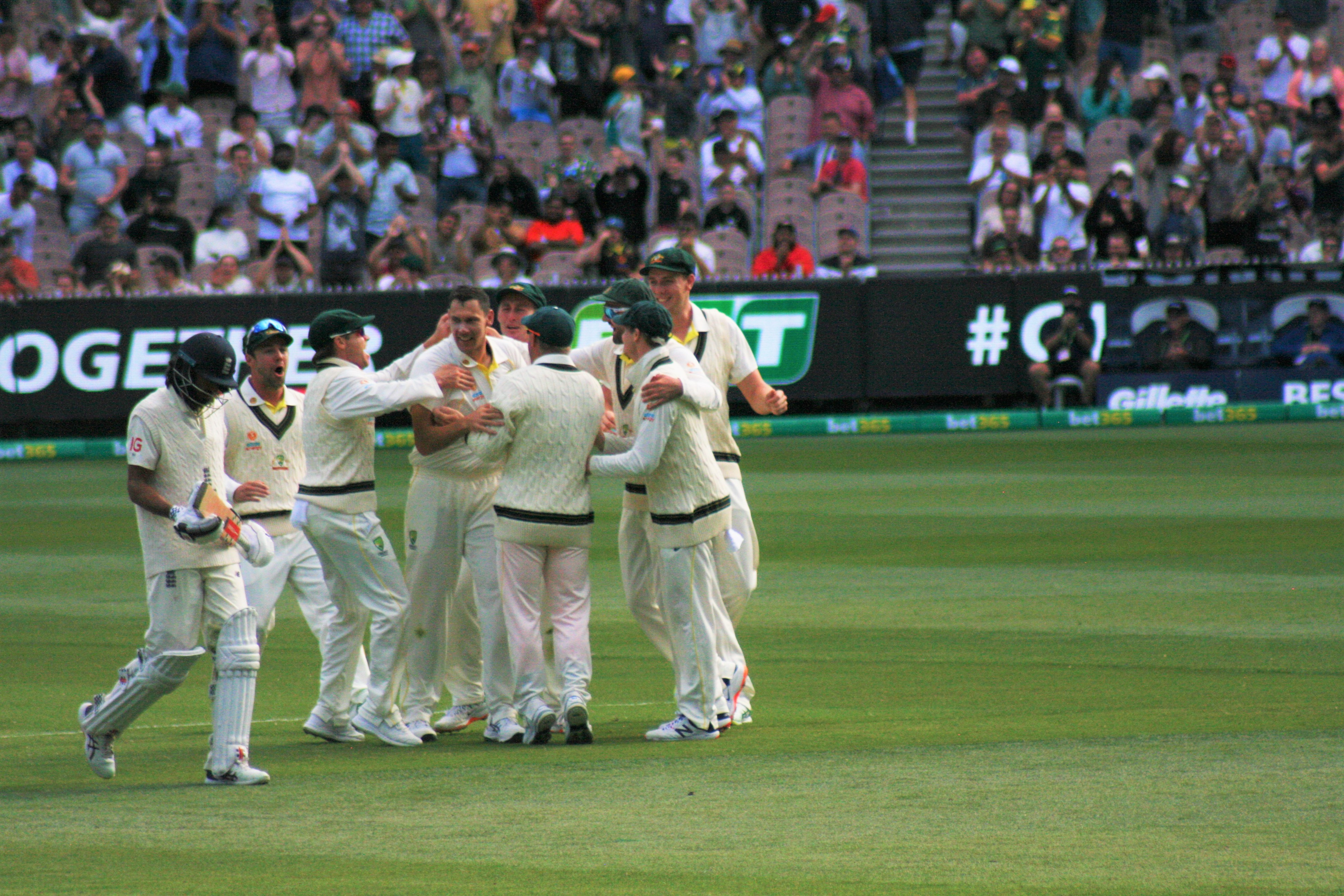
Boland dismisses Haseeb Hameed, third Test match of the 2021–22 Ashes

In December 2021, Boland was added to Australia's Test squad as bowling cover, ahead of the third match of the 2021–22 Ashes series. He made his Test debut on 26 December 2021, against England. Boland had his baggy green cap presented to him by Josh Hazlewood. He took seven wickets in the match, including 6/7 in England's second innings. On taking his sixth wicket, commentator Mark Howard delivered the immortal commentary "Boland's got six at the 'G', build the man a statue!" He was awarded the Mullagh Medal for his performance. He played in the three final Tests of the Ashes series, taking 18 wickets at an average of 9.55.

In 2022, Scott Boland was selected for the second Test match in a two match Test series against the West Indies. He was pivotal in breaking the opening partnerships of the West Indies 2nd Innings with a 3 wicket-maiden over, and finished with figures of 3/16 from 10 overs.

Boland was also selected in the following Test series against South Africa, playing the first two Tests matches. Josh Hazlewood replaced him in the third match. His figures in both Test matches were economical, with Boland taking 4/42 from 19 overs in the first Test and 3/83 from 29 overs in the second Test.

In June 2023, Boland was selected to play in the ICC World Test Final at The Oval against India. Boland collecting 2/59 from 20 overs in the first innings and 3/46 from 16 overs in the second innings. In the second innings, Boland was crucial in breaking opening partnerships, taking the wickets of Shubman Gill, Virat Kohli and Ravindra Jadeja. He was a main part of the win in the test for Australia.

During the 2023 Ashes tour to England, Boland returned best figures of 1 for 60 and only played in 2 tests. However, he achieved his highest test score of 20 in the 4th innings of the 1st test.

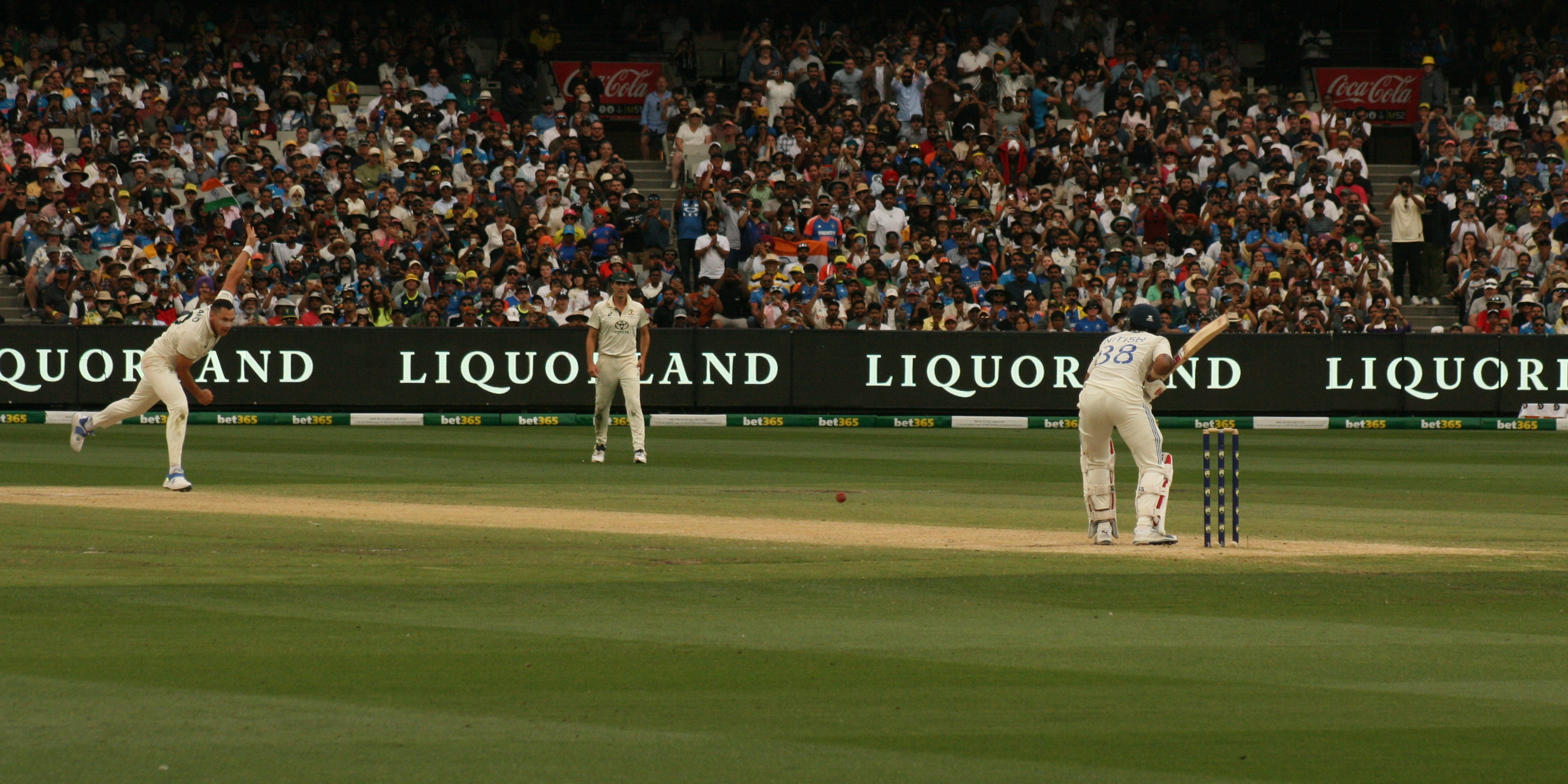
Scott Boland bowling to Nitish Kumar Reddy in the fourth test match of the 2024–25 Border–Gavaskar Trophy.

Scott Boland played in the 2024–25 Border–Gavaskar Trophy. He was selected to play in the Adelaide pink ball test, and returned to the playing XI for the 4th and 5th Tests at Melbourne and Sydney after Josh Hazlewood was ruled out of the series due to injury. In Melbourne he put on a crucial 56 run 10th wicket partnership with Nathan Lyon in Australia's 2nd innings to propel Australia to a winning total in what would eventually be a historical final day win. In the Sydney Test, he took 4/31 from 20 overs in India's first innings as well as 6/45 in the second innings to register his first 10 wicket haul in Test Cricket, a performance which earned him man of the match as Australia went on to win the match by 6 wickets and regain the Border–Gavaskar Trophy after 10 years with a 3–1 scoreline. Boland finished the series with 21 wickets in 6 innings at an average of 13.02, the third most wickets in the series after Jasprit Bumrah and Pat Cummins, with an average that only the former surpassed.

Boland was selected for the third and final test in the 2025 tour of the West Indies, a day/night fixture at Sabina Park, Kingston, Jamaica. Replacing Nathan Lyon to form a four-pronged pace attack alongside Mitchell Starc, Pat Cummins and Josh Hazlewood for the first time, Boland took 3/34 in the first innings, dismissing John Campbell, Shai Hope and Shamar Joseph. In the second innings, he took 3/2 off 2 overs including a hat-trick, having dismissed Justin Greaves (caught at slip by Beau Webster), Shamar Joseph (lbw, on review) and Jomel Warrican (bowled) in successive deliveries, to bowl the West Indies out for 27 in just 14.3 overs, the second-lowest score in Test history. He became only the 10th Australian cricketer (first since Peter Siddle in 2010) and first ever First Nations Australian test cricketer to take a hat-trick in test match cricket. Boland's hat-trick helped Australia to bowl the West Indies out for their lowest total ever in test match cricket.

== Personal life ==
In 2017, Boland's family discovered that his grandfather, John Edward, was Aboriginal, from the Gulidjan tribe in the Colac area of Victoria. After discovering this, Boland sought to embrace his Indigenous heritage, playing in Indigenous representative teams, and seeking to further educate himself on Indigenous traditions.

Boland has two daughters with his wife Daphne.

Boland has a brother, Nick, who also played professional cricket, for Victoria's Future League team. The Indigenous tour to England in 2018 was the first time the brothers played together at any level.

== See also ==
- List of Test cricket hat-tricks
