= Pat Cummins =

Australian cricketer (born 1993)

- Cummins in 2026

Personal information
- Full name: Patrick James Cummins
- Born: 8 May 1993 (age 33); Westmead, New South Wales, Australia
- Nickname: Silencer; Cummo; Cider; Postman Pat; 7/11
- Height: 192 cm (6 ft 4 in)
- Batting: Right-handed
- Bowling: Right-arm fast
- Role: Bowler

International information
- National side: Australia (2011–present)
- Test debut (cap 423): 17 November 2011 v South Africa
- Last Test: 27 October 2026 v South Africa
- ODI debut (cap 189): 19 October 2011 v South Africa
- Last ODI: 30 September 2026 v South Africa
- ODI shirt no.: 30
- T20I debut (cap 51): 13 October 2011 v South Africa
- Last T20I: 24 June 2024 v India
- T20I shirt no.: 30

Domestic team information
- Years: Team
- 2010/11–present: New South Wales
- 2012/13: Sydney Sixers
- 2013/14: Perth Scorchers
- 2014–2015, 2020–2022: Kolkata Knight Riders
- 2014/15–2018/19: Sydney Thunder
- 2017: Delhi Daredevils
- 2024–present: Sunrisers Hyderabad
- 2024: San Francisco Unicorns

Career statistics
Competition	Test	ODI	T20I	FC
Matches	77	91	57	91
Runs scored	1,681	548	158	2,015
Batting average	16.48	14.42	10.53	18.15
100s/50s	0/3	0/0	0/0	0/6
Top score	64*	37	28	82*
Balls bowled	15,259	4,713	1,254	17,861
Wickets	328	143	66	374
Bowling average	22.51	28.90	23.57	23.09
5 wickets in innings	14	1	0	14
10 wickets in match	2	0	0	2
Best bowling	6/23	5/70	3/15	6/23
Catches/stumpings	37/–	24/–	16/–	42/–
Medal record
Men's cricket
Representing Australia
ICC Cricket World Cup
Winner	2015 Australia & New Zealand
Winner	2023 India
ICC T20 World Cup
Winner	2021 UAE & Oman
ICC World Test Championship
Winner	2021–2023
Runner-up	2023–2025
- Source: Cricinfo, 1 November 2026

Patrick James Cummins (born 8 May 1993) is an Australian international cricketer who plays for the Australia national team in all three formats, captaining the team in both Test and One Day International cricket. He is right-armed pace bowler.

Making his international debut in limited-overs cricket in 2011, Cummins came to prominence following his Test debut that same year against South Africa. There, he became the youngest Australian test cricketer since 1953 and took six wickets during the second innings of his debut test match. His struggles with injuries then forced him out of all international cricket until 2015, where he was a member of the tournament-winning Australian Cricket World Cup squad. Only returning to Test cricket in 2017 against India, he became known as one of the greatest fast bowlers in the world. In 2019, he achieved 914 points in the ICC Men's Test Bowling Rankings, joint-highest for any Australian an fifth-highest for any bowler. He was also awarded with the Allan Border Medal in the same year. In 2023, he was awarded with the Sir Garfield Sobers Trophy.

Cummins was named the Australian cricket captain in November 2021, and is also regarded as one of the best bowler captains in history. He captained Australia to win the 2021–2023 World Test Championship and the 2023 Cricket World Cup and took Australia to the 2023–25 ICC World Test Championship final.

== Early life ==
Patrick James Cummins grew up in Mount Riverview in the Blue Mountains west of Sydney with his two brothers and two sisters. He attended St Paul's Grammar School. As a child he idolised Brett Lee, with whom he later briefly played domestic and international cricket.

At the age of three, Cummins lost the top of his middle finger on his dominant right hand when his sister accidentally slammed a door on it.

Cummins played junior cricket for the Glenbrook-Blaxland Cricket Club in the Blue Mountains before playing first-grade cricket for Penrith District Cricket Club in 2010. That same year, Cummins represented NSW in the National Under-17 championships and later the NSW Under-19 team.

== Domestic career ==
In the preliminary final of the 2010–11 KFC Twenty20 Big Bash against Tasmania, Cummins took 4 for 16 and was named Man of the Match. He finished as the equal leading wicket-taker in the tournament.

In March of 2011, Cummins made his first-class debut for New South Wales against Tasmania at 17 years old. He returned figures of 3/118 during the first innings, including 14 maiden overs. Cummins played the final three matches of the 2010–11 Sheffield Shield season, including the final where he bowled 65 overs for the match. He was later ruled out of the Australia A tour of Zimbabwe due to a back injury.

Cummins made his return to domestic cricket in 2016, becoming a key member of the New South Wales one-day squad and the Sydney Thunder, as he remained fit and played 25 matches in just over 4 months. On 7 March 2017, Cummins played in the Sheffield Shield for the first time in six years. He bowled 36 overs and claimed 8 wickets.

=== Indian Premier League ===
Cummins made his Indian Premier League debut in IPL 2014, the 2014 edition of the tournament, playing for Kolkata Knight Riders, to whom he returned for IPL 2015. He was not involved in IPL 2016 and played for Delhi Daredevils in IPL 2017. He was absent from IPL 2018 and IPL 2019.

In the IPL 2020 auction Cummins was bought back by Knight Riders for ₹15.5 crore (A$2.4 million), making him one of the most expensive overseas players in IPL auction history. He stayed with Knight Riders for IPL 2021 and played for them again in IPL 2022 after taking a huge pay cut by selling for ₹7.25 crore (A$1.1 million). In an interview, Cummins said he is 'absolutely pumped' to return to Knight Riders.

Cummins played in 37 IPL matches from 2014 to 2021, taking 38 wickets. In IPL 2021 he played in seven matches and took nine wickets, also scoring 93 runs. In April 2022, Cummins tied the record for fastest half-century in the Indian Premier league in IPL 2022, scoring 50 runs in 14 balls against the Mumbai Indians, which was broken the next year by Yashasvi Jaiswal, who took one ball fewer.

Cummins opted out of IPL 2023, stating that he wanted to focus on his commitments with the national team, including the Ashes series and the ODI World Cup.

Cummins appeared in the 2024 IPL auction, and was bought by the Sunrisers Hyderabad for ₹20.5 crore (A$3.2 million), making him the second-most-expensive player in IPL history after his teammate Mitchell Starc who was bought by the Kolkata Knight Riders for ₹24.75 crore (A$3.8 million) in the same auction. On 4 March 2024, it was announced that Cummins would be leading SRH as the captain. Sunrisers finished the league stage at 2nd position on points table with 8 wins in 14 matches played. The team ultimately finished the tournament as runners-up after losing in final against Kolkata Knight Riders. Cummins came back to play for SRH in 2025 but had a poor season, winning 6 matches and losing 8 out of their 14 matches.

== International career ==
=== Early career and injury struggles (2011–2016) ===
Cummins was granted a Cricket Australia contract in June 2011 and in October 2011, he played two Twenty20 International (T20I) and three One Day International (ODI) matches for Australia against South Africa, claiming ten wickets and subsequently being selected in the Australian Test squad to play in South Africa.

Cummins made his Test match debut at Wanderers Stadium in Johannesburg in November 2011, in what was only his fourth career first-class match, becoming Australia's youngest Test cricketer since Ian Craig in 1953, aged 18 years and 193 days. Cummins took 1/38 and 6/79, becoming the second-youngest Test cricketer (behind Enamul Haque) to take six wickets in an innings. He then scored 13 runs in the second innings, including a four to win the match and was presented with the Man of the Match award. After playing through his Test debut with a heel injury, Cummins was subsequently ruled out of the entire 2011–12 summer.

Cummins was selected in Australia's provisional team for the 2012 Under-19 Cricket World Cup. Cummins represented Australia in the 2012 T20 World Cup and the Sydney Sixers in the 2012 Champions League, but was diagnosed with a stress fracture in his back upon his return to Australia in November, again ruling him out of the 2012/13 home summer.

Cummins returned for Australia A in August 2013, but a recurrence of the stress fracture in his back caused him to miss most of the 2013–14 summer. He returned to the BBL in January 2014 after working with Dennis Lillee during his layoffs to re-shape his bowling action.

Cummins was selected in the Australian squad for their successful 2015 World Cup campaign, playing in four matches.

Cummins was a late call-up for 2015 Ashes squad after the retirement of Ryan Harris, but was not selected for a test during the series. He was part of the ODI and T20I series in the same tour. During the ODI leg of the tour, Cummins' stress fracture resurfaced and he was ruled out of the entire home summer for the fourth time in five years.

=== Return to Test cricket (2017–2018) ===
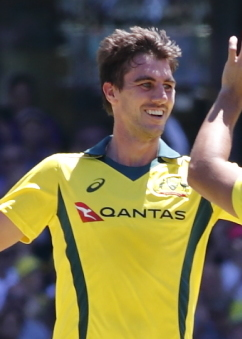
Cummins with Australia during the 2017–18 Ashes series.

Despite NSW medical staff recommending a slow and managed return to red ball cricket, Mitchell Starc was ruled out of the ongoing Border–Gavaskar Trophy and Cummins was selected as his replacement for the third Test.

After 1946 days (5 years, 3 months and 27 days) of absence due to injuries, Cummins returned to test cricket on 16 March 2017. He alleviated any fears over his injury history, bowling 79 overs in the final two Test matches.

Cummins retained his spot in the team for the 2017–18 Ashes series, taking 23 wickets, leading the wicket taking tally. He also established himself as a handy lower-order batter, scoring two scores in the 40s during the series as Australia was victorious 4–0.

Cummins scored his first Test half-century in the fourth Test against South Africa during Australia's tour of South Africa in 2017–18. In this series, he solidified his place as one of Australia's most reliable and consistent bowlers, playing in all four matches and claiming 22 wickets. He was then rested for the tour of the UAE vs Pakistan in October 2018 as he managed a back injury.

He returned for the 2018–19 Test series against India, claiming 14 wickets in four Tests in a beaten Australian team.

=== Australian vice-captaincy (2019–2021) ===
In January 2019 Cummins became one of Australia's two Test vice-captains, alongside Travis Head. He played in both Tests against the touring Sri Lankans and was the chief architect of Australia's innings win in the first Test at the Gabba, taking his maiden 10-wicket haul. He finished the series with 14 wickets and was named as the player of the series.

Cummins was awarded the Allan Border Medal in February 2019 as the most outstanding Australian cricketer over the previous 12 months. He was the first bowler to receive this honour since 2014, and just the fourth overall. In early 2019 Cummins became the world's number 1 ranked Test bowler, the first Australian since Glenn McGrath to achieve this.

He played in the limited-overs series against India that began in the same month, taking a five-wicket haul in the fourth ODI of the series. In April, he was named in Australia's squad for the 2019 Cricket World Cup held in England, and during the tournament played in his 50th ODI.

He went on to play in the 2019 Ashes series which followed the World Cup. In the first Test he claimed his 100th Test wicket, the fastest Australian since World War II to do so. After the second test at Lords, he reached an ICC Test bowling ranking of 914 – the equal fifth of all time and highest by an Australian. Cummins was the leading wicket-taker for the series, taking 29 wickets in the five matches, at an average of 19.62.

Cummins enjoyed another successful home summer, taking 20 wickets in five Tests against Pakistan and New Zealand as Australia remained unbeaten and Cummins was elevated to the role of sole vice-captain of the team. Cummins was one of five Australians to be named in the 2019 ICC Test Team of the Year and was named as the 2019 ICC Men's Test Cricketer of the Year.

In February 2020 Cummins took his 100th wicket in ODI cricket, in the first match of Australia's tour of South Africa.

During the 2020–21 Border–Gavaskar Trophy Cummins claimed a series-leading 21 wickets at an average of 20.04, and was named player of the series despite Australia's 2–1 loss.

In August 2021 Cummins was named in Australia's squad for the 2021 ICC Men's T20 World Cup as vice-captain. He played in all of the matches, taking five wickets with an economy rate of 7.37 as Australia won the tournament for the first time.

=== Australian captaincy (2021–present) ===
Cummins bowling against South Africa in 2026

Pat Cummins' record as captain
	Matches	Won	Lost	Drawn	Tied	No result	Win %
Test	37	23	8	6	0	–	62.16%
ODI	17	13	4	0	0	0	76.47%
Last updated:		15 July 2025					

On 26 November 2021, Cummins was announced as the 47th captain of the Australian Test cricket team following the resignation of Tim Paine. Steve Smith was announced as his vice-captain, marking Smith's return to a leadership position after the 2018 ball-tampering scandal. Cummins was the first fast bowler to take on the role of full-time Australian captain in history. He took seven wickets in his first Test as captain during the first match of the 2021–22 Ashes series, including a five wicket haul in the first innings, a first for an Australian seam bowling captain. Despite being absent from the 2nd Test of the series after being a close contact of a COVID-19 case at an Adelaide restaurant, Cummins was the leading wicket-taker for the third consecutive Ashes series, with 21 wickets in 4 matches. Under his captaincy, Australia defeated England 4–0.

Under the captaincy of Cummins, Australia toured Pakistan, 24 years since their previous visit in 1998. Cummins was a leading wicket-taker in the inaugural Benaud–Qadir Trophy series along with Nathan Lyon. He took 12 wickets across three Test matches with a 22.50 bowling average. Cummins took his seventh 5-wicket haul in the first innings of the third Test match in Lahore and 3 wickets in the second innings, which helped Australia to go on and win the series 1–0 in Pakistan.

On 17 November 2022 Cummins captained Australia for the first time in ODIs after Aaron Finch retired from ODI cricket,

Cummins led Australia in the first two matches in the 4-Match Border–Gavaskar series against India in which Australia lost both matches. Cummins had to fly back to Australia due to his mother's illness, with Steve Smith taking over as captain for the remaining two matches and the three-match ODI series.

Cummins led Australia to victory in ICC World Test Championship Final 2023 against India, 7–11 June 2023. Following the fourth Test of the 2023 Ashes, there were concerns about Cummins' tactics as captain.

Cummins was named captain of Australia's 2023 Cricket World Cup team in India. He had captained Australia in just four ODI games before the world cup and was the least experienced captain in the tournament. The team did not start well, losing the first two games of league stage and were at the bottom of the point table. From there onwards, the team won consecutively 9 matches and won the sixth world cup title for Australia defeating the hosts India in the final. Pat Cummins took 15 wickets in 11 matches with economy of 5.75 and scored 128 runs in 8 innings with average of 32. He was involved in the record partnership of 202 from 170 balls for 9th wicket with Glenn Maxwell in the eighth league match against Afghanistan. He contributed 12 runs from 68 balls in the partnership which is one of slowest innings in ODI history. On 19 November, he became the fifth Australian captain to lift the 50-over World Cup. He picked up 2 crucial wickets of Virat Kohli and Shreyas Iyer in the final, conceding only 34 runs off his 10 overs. Pat's captaincy in the final match against India was appreciated by many cricket fans and experts.

In December 2023 and January 2024, Cummins captained Australia to a retention of the Benaud–Qadir Trophy, with Australia winning all three matches in the series. Cummins also took his second career 10-wicket haul in the Second Test at the MCG and passed the milestone of 250 dismissals in Test cricket with the dismissal of Mohammed Rizwan as Australia cruised to a 79 run victory over Pakistan.

In May 2024, Cummins was selected for Australia's team for the 2024 ICC Men's T20 World Cup. During the tournament, Cummins became the second cricketer to take two hat-tricks across consecutive international matches.

In December 2024 to January 2025, Cummins captained Australia to win the five-match Border–Gavaskar Trophy series against India, ending a seven year drought. During the series, Cummins was Australia’s top wicket-taker in the series with 25 wickets at an average of 21.36, including a key five-wicket haul. He also contributed with the bat, scoring 159 runs in eight innings, with useful knocks like 49 and 41 in the Boxing Day Test at Melbourne. His performance in the fourth test at the MCG, where he took 6 wickets and scored 90 runs, earned him the Johnny Mullagh Medal for the second consecutive year.

In June 2025, Cummins captained the team at the 2025 ICC World Test Championship final against South Africa. Despite him taking 7 wickets including 6/28 in the first innings, Australia lost the match by 5 wickets. During the match, Cummins took his 300th test wicket, becoming the 8th Australian to reach that milestone.

During the 2025–26 Ashes series, Cummins only played 1 match, the 3rd Test in Adelaide due to a back injury. Steve Smith was his stand-in captain in the other 4 matches he missed. In the match he did play, he took 6 wickets for the match, including getting Joe Root out both times he batted in the match, adding to his total times dismissing him to 13, the most times of any bowler.

== Achievements ==
- Sir Garfield Sobers Trophy (ICC Cricketer of the Year): 2023
- ICC Men's Test Cricketer of the Year: 2019
- ICC Men's Test Team of the Year: 2019, 2022, 2023 (captain), 2024 (captain).
- ICC Men's Player of the Month: December 2023.
- Allan Border Medal: 2019 At The Australian Cricket Awards.
- Shane Warne (Men’s Test Player of the Year): 2021 At The Australian Cricket Awards.
- Wisden Cricketer of the Year: 2020
- Wisden Leading Cricketer in the World: 2023

== Personal life ==
Cummins attended the University of Technology, Sydney under its Elite Athlete Program, graduating in 2017 with a Bachelor of Business.

On 5 February 2020 Cummins got engaged to his longtime girlfriend Rebecca Boston; the couple have a son born in October 2021 and a daughter born in February 2025. They married on 1 August 2022.

His mother Maria Cummins died on 10 March 2023 after a prolonged illness.

Cummins is a supporter of the Penrith Panthers in the National Rugby League.

Awards
Preceded by Steve Smith	Allan Border Medal; 2019	Succeeded by David Warner
