= Haseeb Hameed =

English cricketer (born 1997)

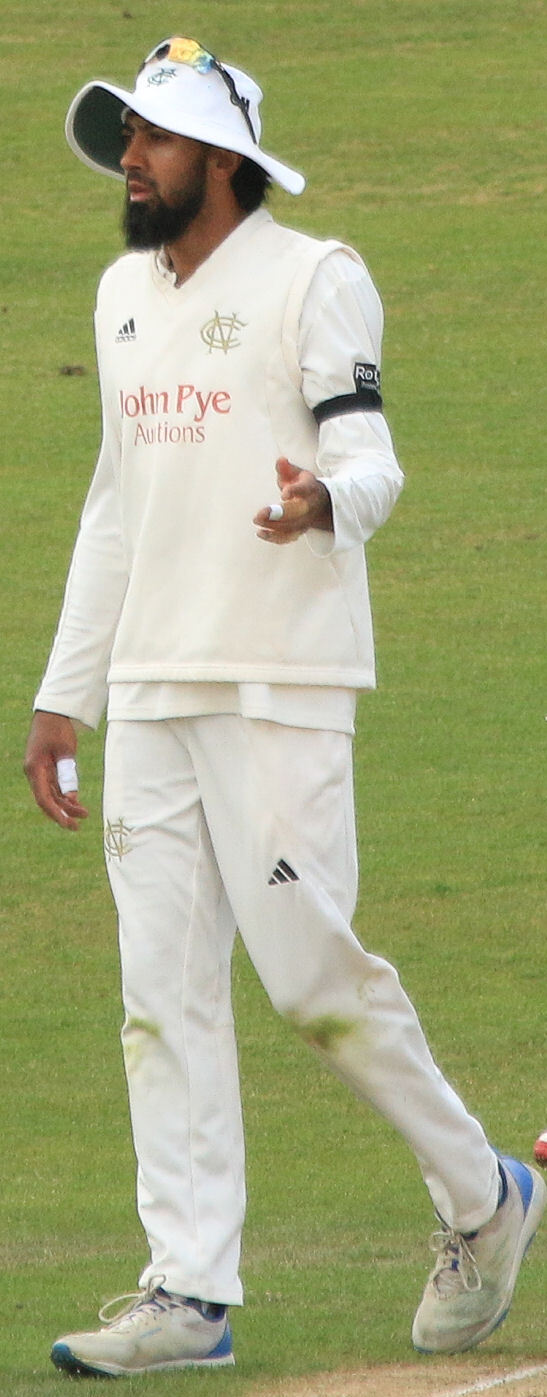
- Hameed in 2025

Personal information
- Full name: Haseeb Hameed
- Born: 17 January 1997 (age 29); Bolton, Greater Manchester, England
- Batting: Right-handed
- Bowling: Right-arm leg break
- Role: Opening batsman

International information
- National side: England (2016–2022)
- Test debut (cap 674): 9 November 2016 v India
- Last Test: 5 January 2022 v Australia

Domestic team information
- Years: Team
- 2015–2019: Lancashire
- 2020–present: Nottinghamshire

Career statistics
Competition	Test	FC	LA	T20
Matches	10	159	63	2
Runs scored	439	9,299	2,050	41
Batting average	24.38	37.80	37.96	20.50
100s/50s	0/4	21/47	4/15	0/0
Top score	82	247*	114	23
Balls bowled	–	141	–	–
Wickets	–	1	–	–
Bowling average	–	71.00	–	–
5 wickets in innings	–	0	–	–
10 wickets in match	–	0	–	–
Best bowling	–	1/0	–	–
Catches/stumpings	7/–	90/–	25/–	2/–
- Source: ESPNcricinfo, 26 September 2026

Haseeb Hameed (born 17 January 1997) is an English professional cricketer who has played internationally for the England Test cricket team. In domestic cricket, he represents Nottinghamshire, having previously played for Lancashire. Hameed made his Test debut in 2016. He plays as a right-handed opening batsman.

== Early and personal life ==
Hameed was born in Bolton on 17 January 1997 to parents who emigrated from India and was brought up as a Muslim. His father, Ismail Ansari is from Umraj village in Bharuch, Gujarat, India. Hameed was educated at Bolton School, and helped them become only the second school from the north of England to win the independent schools national championship.

== Domestic career ==
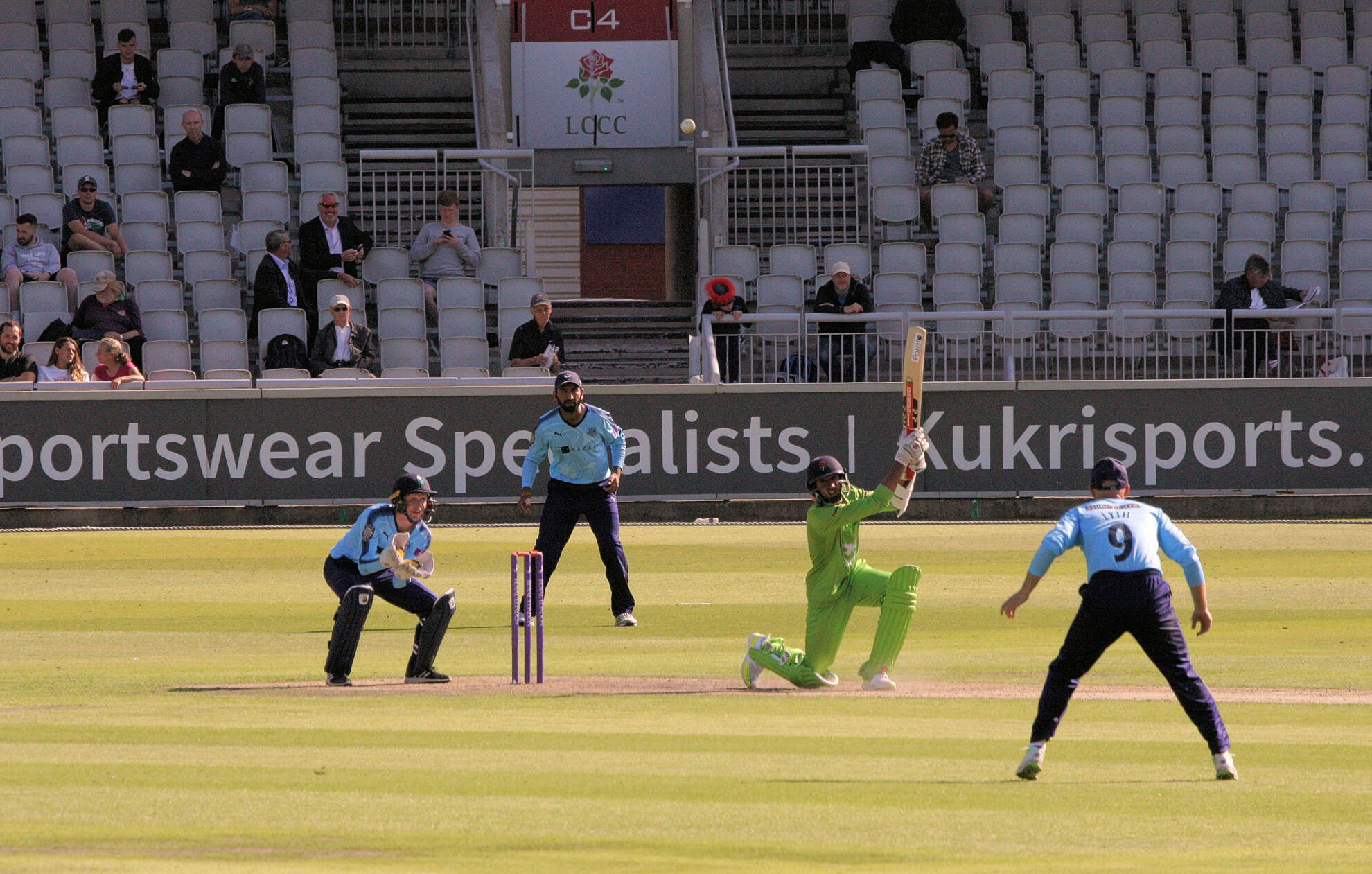
Hameed batting for Lancashire in a List A match in 2018. He was released from the club in 2019, and signed a two-year deal with Nottinghamshire.

Hameed made his first-class debut for Lancashire against Glamorgan in August 2015, following Lancashire's decision to release batsman Paul Horton. Hameed replaced him and opened the batting alongside Karl Brown. He scored 28 in his first innings. He played another three first-class matches that season and averaged 42 with a highest score of 91. In February 2016, Hameed signed a four-year contract for Lancashire ahead of the 2016 season. He scored over 1,000 runs in that season, breaking Mike Atherton's record as the youngest Lancashire player to reach that landmark.

Hameed made his List A debut for Lancashire in the 2017 Royal London One-Day Cup on 28 April 2017 and played a major role in Lancashire's victory

In April 2019, as part of the Marylebone Cricket Club University fixtures, Hameed scored a double century against Loughborough MCCU.

In August 2019, Lancashire announced that Hameed would be released at the end of the season; three months later, he signed a two-year contract with Nottinghamshire.

Hameed was appointed captain of Nottinghamshire in November 2023 replacing Steven Mullaney. In May 2024, Hameed carried his bat against Lancashire, scoring a career best 247 not out.

On 26 July 2024, he scored 101 not out against Sussex in an unbeaten partnership of 209 with Ben Slater during a One-Day Cup match at the John Fretwell Sporting Complex to set a new record for a Nottinghamshire third wicket stand in List A cricket.

Hameed was named Nottinghamshire overall and county championship player of the year for the 2024 season.

On 16 May 2025, Hameed carried his bat in Nottinghamshire's first innings against Durham at the Riverside Ground, making 206 in a team total of 407. He made his second first-class double century of the season on 31 July 2025, scoring 208 against Somerset at Trent Bridge. Hameed ended the season with 1,258 first-class runs, scored at an average of 66.21, as he led Nottinghamshire to their first County Championship title in 15 years and was subsequently named the club's county championship and overall player of the season for the second successive year.

On 2 September 2026, Hameed passed 9,000 first-class career runs during a county championship match against Leicestershire at Trent Bridge. Three days later, during Nottinghamshire second innings in the same match, he made his 21st first-class century with 109 not out.

== International cricket ==
=== Maiden international call-up and debut ===
In September 2016, Hameed was named in England's Test squad for their tour to Bangladesh. His subsequent debut came in England's following tour of India.

=== 2016: India ===
Hameed became the youngest debutant to open for England in a Test match, when he played in the first Test against India at Rajkot on 9 November 2016.

On 12 November 2016, the fourth day of the first Test, Hameed scored his maiden Test half century, becoming the third youngest England batsman to reach 50 runs. He eventually was dismissed for 82; this followed on from a promising debut innings of 31. In the second Test, he made 13 in England's first innings, before making 25 in the second innings. In the third Test, he was dismissed for nine in the first innings as England made 283. He broke his finger in his 1st innings dismissal but still went on to score an unbeaten half century batting, below his usual opening position, at number 8 in the second innings. It was later announced he would miss the rest of the tour after flying home to have surgery on his finger.

=== 2021: New Zealand & India ===
Hameed made his return to the England squad for the Test series against New Zealand in 2021, but did not feature in any Test before being named again in the squad for the series against India. He also scored a century for the County Select XI in a warmup match against India before the series. Brought into the team for the second Test, he was bowled out for a first ball duck in the first innings, before going on to make 9 runs in his second innings of the match. For the third test of the series, he was promoted to opener in the batting order, and responded by scoring 68 runs, making a 135 run first wicket stand alongside Rory Burns - England's highest since Hameed's 2016 stand of 180 alongside Alastair Cook in Rajkot.

=== 2021: Australia ===
Hameed was selected for the 2021–22 Ashes. In the 1st test at the Gabba, Hameed made 25 in first innings and 27 in 2nd innings. He was dropped for the 5th Test after poor run scores in the first four tests.

== Awards ==
In January 2017, Hameed was awarded the Best at Sport award at the British Muslim Awards.
