= ICC Test Championship Mace =

Trophy in the sport of cricket

- Awarded for: Leading the Test Championship (2003–2019); Winning the World Test Championship (2019–present)
- Presented by: International Cricket Council

History
- First award: Test Championship (2003); World Test Championship (2019–2021)
- First winner: Australia (TC; 2003); New Zealand (WTC; 2019–2021)
- Most recent: South Africa (2023–2025)

The Test Championship Mace is the International Cricket Council trophy for the Test cricket format. Since 2019, it has been given to the winner of the World Test Championship cycle. Until 2019, it was held by the top-ranked team in the Test Championship.

== History ==
The mace's original design dates back to 2000, when it was crafted by Trevor Brown, a trophy designer employed at Thomas Lyte. In 2021, the mace underwent a redesign, and the updated version was created at the workshop of Thomas Lyte in London.

Prior to the introduction of the World Test Championship, the mace was awarded to the team at the top of the ICC Men's Test Team Rankings. Since the inception of the WTC Final, the mace has been awarded to the winning team, with the New Zealand team being the first recipient.

== Design ==
The mace is made from sterling silver and gold plate, with a hardwood base. Its design features a handle resembling a cricket stump, wrapped in a silver-gilt laurel band. The top of the mace is a gold-plated cricket ball within a global map, inspired by the image a cricketer holding a stump as a souvenir after a match.

The design incorporates longitude lines similar to those on a globe, creating reflections against the golden cricket ball. These lines were shaped using hot forging and soldered together to form the globe shape. Around this globe is a belt displaying the insignia of the 12 Test nations participating, with space to include additional nations in the future.

== List of holders / winners ==
=== Test Championship (2003–2019) ===
Team	Start	End	Total months	Cumulative months	Highest rating
Australia	June 2003	August 2009	74	74	143
South Africa	August 2009	November 2009	3	3	122
India	November 2009	August 2011	21	21	125
England	August 2011	August 2012	12	12	125
South Africa	August 2012	May 2014	21	24	135
Australia	May 2014	July 2014	3	77	123
South Africa	July 2014	January 2016	18	42	130
India	January 2016	February 2016	1	22	110
Australia	February 2016	August 2016	6	83	118
India	August 2016	August 2016	1	23	112
Pakistan	August 2016	October 2016	2	2	111
India	October 2016	May 2020	43	66	130
Reference: ICC Rankings.

=== World Test Championship (2019–present) ===
Year	Final Venue	Winners	Result	Runners up	Player of the Match	Captain	Umpires	Ref(s)
2019–2021	Rose Bowl, Southampton	New Zealand 249 & 140/2	New Zealand won by 8 wickets Scorecard	India 217 & 170	(New Zealand) Kyle Jamieson	(New Zealand) Kane Williamson	(England) Michael Gough (England) Richard Illingworth	
2021–2023	The Oval, London	Australia 469 & 270/8d	Australia won by 209 runs Scorecard	India 296 & 234	(Australia) Travis Head	(Australia) Pat Cummins	(New Zealand) Chris Gaffaney (England) Richard Illingworth	
2023–2025	Lord's, London	South Africa 138 & 282/5	South Africa won by 5 wickets Scorecard	Australia 212 & 207	(South Africa) Aiden Markram	(South Africa) Temba Bavuma	(New Zealand) Chris Gaffaney (England) Richard Illingworth	
