= English cricket team in Sri Lanka in 2020–21 =

International cricket tour

	Sri Lanka	England
- Dates: 14 – 26 January 2021
Captains	Dinesh Chandimal	Joe Root

Test series
- Result: England won the 2-match series 2–0
Most runs	Angelo Mathews (213)	Joe Root (426)
Most wickets	Lasith Embuldeniya (15)	Dom Bess (12)
- Player of the series: Joe Root (Eng)

The England cricket team toured Sri Lanka in January 2021 to play two Test matches. The Test series formed part of the inaugural 2019–2021 ICC World Test Championship. Originally, the tour was scheduled to take place in March 2020, but the series was postponed due to the COVID-19 pandemic. In December 2020, the England and Wales Cricket Board (ECB) confirmed the dates for the tour, with both Test matches played in Galle.

England won the first Test match by seven wickets to take a 1–0 lead in the series. England won the second Test by six wickets to win the series 2–0. The win was England's fifth successive victory overseas, their best away streak since touring South Africa in 1914.

== Background ==
Originally England's tour to Sri Lanka was scheduled to take place in March 2020. However, on 13 March 2020, the two-match Test series was postponed due to the COVID-19 pandemic. At the time of the announcement, England were mid-way through a four-day match against the Sri Lanka Board President's XI team, which was ended abruptly. On 1 May 2020, Sri Lanka Cricket announced that the tour would be rescheduled to be played in January 2021, although the ECB did not confirm the fixtures at the time.

In July 2020, the International Cricket Council (ICC) confirmed it was their priority to reschedule the matches, along with the five other World Test Championship series that had been postponed due to the pandemic. In October 2020, Sri Lanka's head coach Mickey Arthur said he was "really positive" that the rescheduled tour would go ahead. In November 2020, Sri Lanka Cricket's CEO Ashley de Silva announced the dates for the tour, subject to agreement by both cricket boards. In December 2020, the ECB confirmed that the tour would go ahead as planned in January.

In December 2020, a new strain of the COVID virus was discovered, prompting concern from Sri Lanka Cricket's medical staff regarding the tour. Despite a travel ban from Britain due to the new variant, the England cricket team were given permission to fly to Sri Lanka. On 3 January 2021, the England cricket team arrived at Mattala Rajapaksa International Airport.

== Squads ==
Tests
Sri Lanka	England
Dinesh Chandimal (c); ~~Dimuth Karunaratne (c)~~; Minod Bhanuka; Dushmantha Chameera; ~~Dhananjaya de Silva~~; Niroshan Dickwella (wk); Lasith Embuldeniya; Asitha Fernando; Oshada Fernando; Vishwa Fernando; ~~Santhush Gunathilake~~; Wanindu Hasaranga; Lahiru Kumara; Suranga Lakmal; ~~Dilshan Madushanka~~; Angelo Mathews; Kusal Mendis; Ramesh Mendis; Dilruwan Perera; Kusal Perera (wk); Nuwan Pradeep; ~~Kasun Rajitha~~; Lakshan Sandakan; Dasun Shanaka; Roshen Silva; Lahiru Thirimanne	Joe Root (c); Moeen Ali; James Anderson; Jonny Bairstow; Dom Bess; Stuart Broad; Jos Buttler (wk); Zak Crawley; Sam Curran; Ben Foakes; Dan Lawrence; Jack Leach; Dom Sibley; Olly Stone; Chris Woakes; Mark Wood

England also named James Bracey, Mason Crane, Saqib Mahmood, Craig Overton, Matt Parkinson, Ollie Robinson and Amar Virdi as reserve players for the tour. Upon arrival in Hambantota, England's Moeen Ali tested positive for COVID-19, and was placed into isolation for ten days. Chris Woakes was identified as a close contact to Ali, and so was forced to self-isolate for seven days.

Ahead of the tour, Sri Lanka made several changes to their squad. Dhananjaya de Silva and Kasun Rajitha were ruled out of the series after being injured in the first Test at Centurion during the tour of South Africa. Avishka Fernando, Ashan Priyanjan, Ramesh Mendis, Roshen Silva, Angelo Mathews, Nuwan Pradeep and Lakshan Sandakan, who were not part of the Test tour of South Africa, were initially called up as reserves for the series for Oshada Fernando, Dhananjaya de Silva, Dinesh Chandimal, Kasun Rajitha, Wanindu Hasaranga and Lahiru Kumara. Later, Avishka Fernando and Ashan Priyanjan were left out from the squad. Dinesh Chandimal captained Sri Lanka in the first Test due to Dimuth Karunaratne's injury.

Prior to the second Test match, Dimuth Karunaratne, Kusal Mendis, Minod Bhanuka, Lahiru Kumara and Nuwan Pradeep were all released from the Sri Lankan squad. Dinesh Chandimal was again named as captain in Karunaratne's absence.

== Warm-up match ==
Ahead of the Test series, England played a two-day intra-squad warm-up match in Sooriyawewa. Ollie Pope took part in the match as preparation for England's tour of India, despite not being named in the Test or reserve squads for the matches against Sri Lanka. No play was possible on the second day of the match due to heavy rain.

8–9 January 2021
Scorecard

Team Root	v	Team Buttler
184/2d (50 overs); Joe Root 74* (117); Mason Crane 1/37 (5 overs)		120/6 (38 overs); Ollie Pope 58* (91); Ollie Robinson 2/15 (4 overs)

Match drawn
Mahinda Rajapaksa International Cricket Stadium, Hambantota

- Toss uncontested.
- No play was possible on day 2 due to rain.

== Test series ==
=== 1st Test ===
14–18 January 2021
Scorecard

Sri Lanka	v	England
135 (46.1 overs); Dinesh Chandimal 28 (71); Dom Bess 5/30 (10.1 overs)		421 (117.1 overs); Joe Root 228 (321); Dilruwan Perera 4/109 (36.1 overs)
359 (136.5 overs); Lahiru Thirimanne 111 (251); Jack Leach 5/122 (41.5 overs)		76/3 (24.2 overs); Jonny Bairstow 35* (65); Lasith Embuldeniya 2/29 (12 overs)

England won by 7 wickets
Galle International Stadium, Galle
Umpires: Kumar Dharmasena (SL) and Ruchira Palliyaguruge (SL)
Player of the match: Joe Root (Eng)

- Sri Lanka won the toss and elected to bat.
- No play was possible after tea on day 2 due to rain.
- Dan Lawrence (Eng) made his Test debut.
- Dinesh Chandimal (SL) scored his 4,000th run in Tests.
- Angelo Mathews (SL) scored his 6,000th run in Tests.
- Joe Root (Eng) scored his 8,000th run in Tests. His score of 228 was the highest score by an England batsman in Sri Lanka.
- World Test Championship points: England 60, Sri Lanka 0.

=== 2nd Test ===
22–26 January 2021 (Note: While five days of play were scheduled for each Test, the second Test reached a result in four days.)
Scorecard

Sri Lanka	v	England
381 (139.3 overs); Angelo Mathews 110 (238); James Anderson 6/40 (29 overs)		344 (116.1 overs); Joe Root 186 (309); Lasith Embuldeniya 7/137 (42 overs)
126 (35.5 overs); Lasith Embuldeniya 40 (42); Dom Bess 4/49 (16 overs)		164/4 (43.3 overs); Dom Sibley 56* (144); Lasith Embuldeniya 3/73 (20 overs)

England won by 6 wickets
Galle International Stadium, Galle
Umpires: Kumar Dharmasena (SL) and Ruchira Palliyaguruge (SL)
Player of the match: Joe Root (Eng)

- Sri Lanka won the toss and elected to bat.
- Ramesh Mendis (SL) made his Test debut.
- James Anderson (Eng) took his 30th five-wicket haul in Tests.
- England became the first team in Tests to take 10 wickets in the first innings with seam and 10 wickets in the second innings with spin.
- World Test Championship points: England 60, Sri Lanka 0.
