= South African cricket team in the West Indies in 2021 =

International cricket tour

South Africa against the West Indies in 2021
	West Indies	South Africa
- Dates: 10 June – 3 July 2021
Captains	Kraigg Brathwaite (Tests); Kieron Pollard (T20Is)	Dean Elgar (Tests) Temba Bavuma (T20Is)

Test series
- Result: South Africa won the 2-match series 2–0
Most runs	Jermaine Blackwood (88)	Quinton de Kock (237)
Most wickets	Kemar Roach (9)	Kagiso Rabada (11)
- Player of the series: Quinton de Kock (SA)

Twenty20 International series
- Results: South Africa won the 5-match series 3–2
Most runs	Evin Lewis (178)	Quinton de Kock (255)
Most wickets	Dwayne Bravo (10)	Kagiso Rabada (7); Tabraiz Shamsi (7)
- Player of the series: Tabraiz Shamsi (SA)

The South Africa cricket team toured the West Indies in June and July 2021 to play two Test matches and five Twenty20 International (T20I) matches. The Test series formed part of the inaugural 2019–2021 ICC World Test Championship. The tour was initially scheduled for 2020, but was postponed due to fixture congestion caused by the COVID-19 pandemic. The fixtures for the tour were confirmed by Cricket West Indies in May 2021.

South Africa won the first Test by an innings and 63 runs inside three days. South Africa won the second Test match by 158 runs to take the series 2–0.

On 29 June 2021, the South African players wore black armbands in remembrance of former South African team manager Goolam Rajah, and a one-minute's silence was observed prior to the start of play. South Africa's Tabraiz Shamsi dedicated the team's one-run victory over the West Indies as a tribute to Goolam. The West Indies won the fourth T20I match by 21 runs, to tie the series at 2–2 with one game to play. South Africa won the fifth T20I by 25 runs, winning the series 3–2.

== Background ==
Originally, the tour was scheduled to take place in July and August 2020. The first two T20I matches would have been played at the Central Broward Regional Park in Florida. The Test series would have formed part of the inaugural 2019–2021 ICC World Test Championship. However, the series was later postponed, as the West Indies toured England at the same time, after those fixtures were rescheduled due to the COVID-19 pandemic.

In July 2020, Johnny Grave, chief executive of Cricket West Indies, suggested that the series could take place in September 2020. Also in July 2020, the International Cricket Council (ICC) confirmed it was their priority to reschedule the matches, along with the five other World Test Championship series that had been postponed due to the pandemic. On 1 August 2020, Graeme Smith confirmed that the tour had been postponed indefinitely, due to schedule clashes with the 2020 Caribbean Premier League and the 2020 Indian Premier League. In April 2021, it was reported that the tour would be taking place in June 2021, but this was initially thrown into further doubt when Cricket South Africa was threatened with "defunding" and "derecognising" by Nathi Mthethwa, South Africa's Minister of Arts and Culture. However, after sanctions were not imposed on Cricket South Africa, the tour dates were confirmed in May 2021.

== Squads ==
Tests		T20Is	
West Indies	South Africa	West Indies	South Africa
Kraigg Brathwaite (c); Jermaine Blackwood (vc); Nkrumah Bonner; Darren Bravo; Roston Chase; Rahkeem Cornwall; Joshua Da Silva (wk); Shannon Gabriel; Jason Holder; Shai Hope (wk); Alzarri Joseph; Kyle Mayers; Kieran Powell; Kemar Roach; Jayden Seales	Dean Elgar (c); Temba Bavuma (vc); Quinton de Kock (wk); Sarel Erwee; Beuran Hendricks; Marco Jansen; George Linde; Keshav Maharaj; Lungi Ngidi; Aiden Markram; Wiaan Mulder; Anrich Nortje; Keegan Petersen; Kagiso Rabada; Tabraiz Shamsi; Prenelan Subrayen; Rassie van der Dussen; Kyle Verreynne; Lizaad Williams	Kieron Pollard (c); Nicholas Pooran (vc, wk); Fabian Allen; Dwayne Bravo; Sheldon Cottrell; Fidel Edwards; Andre Fletcher (wk); Chris Gayle; Shimron Hetmyer; Jason Holder; Akeal Hosein; Evin Lewis; Obed McCoy; Andre Russell; Lendl Simmons; Kevin Sinclair	Temba Bavuma (c); Heinrich Klaasen (vc, wk); Quinton de Kock (wk); Bjorn Fortuin; Beuran Hendricks; Reeza Hendricks; George Linde; Sisanda Magala; Janneman Malan; Aiden Markram; David Miller; Wiaan Mulder; Lungi Ngidi; Anrich Nortje; Andile Phehlukwayo; ~~Dwaine Pretorius~~; Kagiso Rabada; Tabraiz Shamsi; Rassie van der Dussen; Kyle Verreynne; Lizaad Williams

On 18 May 2021, Cricket West Indies (CWI) named a 18-man provisional squad for the T20I matches, with Kieron Pollard captaining the team. On 4 June 2021, CWI named a 17-man provisional squad for the Test matches, with Kraigg Brathwaite named as the team's captain. Ahead of the second Test, CWI recalled Darren Bravo and Shannon Gabriel for the match, with Nkrumah Bonner being unavailable due to suffering with a concussion in the first Test. Ahead of the T20I series, Dwaine Pretorius tested positive for COVID-19 and was replaced in South Africa's squad by Wiaan Mulder. Beuran Hendricks was also added to South Africa's T20I squad. Ahead of the third T20I, Shimron Hetmyer was added to the West Indies' squad, and Akeal Hosein was added to their squad ahead of the fourth T20I. For the fifth T20I, Sheldon Cottrell replaced Fabian Allen in the West Indies' squad.

== Test series ==
=== 1st Test ===
10–14 June 2021 (Note: While five days of play were scheduled for each Test, the first Test reached a result in three days, and the second Test reached a result in four days.)
Scorecard

West Indies	v	South Africa
97 (40.5 overs); Jason Holder 20 (41); Lungi Ngidi 5/19 (13.5 overs)		322 (96.5 overs); Quinton de Kock 141* (170); Jason Holder 4/75 (20.5 overs)
162 (64 overs); Roston Chase 62 (156); Kagiso Rabada 5/34 (20 overs)

South Africa won by an innings and 63 runs
Daren Sammy Cricket Ground, Saint Lucia
Umpires: Gregory Brathwaite (WI) and Joel Wilson (WI)
Player of the match: Quinton de Kock (SA)

- West Indies won the toss and elected to bat.
- Jayden Seales (WI), Keegan Petersen and Kyle Verreynne (SA) all made their Test debuts.
- Kieran Powell replaced Nkrumah Bonner as a concussion substitute for the West Indies.
- World Test Championship points: South Africa 60, West Indies 0.

=== 2nd Test ===
18–22 June 2021
Scorecard

South Africa	v	West Indies
298 (112.4 overs); Quinton de Kock 96 (162); Kyle Mayers 3/28 (15 overs)		149 (54 overs); Jermaine Blackwood 49 (106); Wiaan Mulder 3/1 (4 overs)
174 (53 overs); Rassie van der Dussen 75* (142); Kemar Roach 4/52 (13 overs)		165 (58.3 overs); Kieran Powell 51 (116); Keshav Maharaj 5/36 (17.3 overs)

South Africa won by 158 runs
Daren Sammy Cricket Ground, Saint Lucia
Umpires: Gregory Brathwaite (WI) and Joel Wilson (WI)
Player of the match: Kagiso Rabada (SA)

- West Indies won the toss and elected to field.
- No play was possible before lunch on day 3 due to rain.
- Keshav Maharaj became the second bowler for South Africa to take a hat-trick in Tests.
- World Test Championship points: South Africa 60, West Indies –6. (Note: West Indies were deducted six WTC points for bowling a slow over-rate.)

== T20I series ==
=== 1st T20I ===
26 June 2021
14:00
Scorecard

South Africa; 160/6 (20 overs)	v	West Indies; 161/2 (15 overs)
Rassie van der Dussen 56* (38); Fabian Allen 2/18 (4 overs)		Evin Lewis 71 (35); Tabraiz Shamsi 1/27 (4 overs)

West Indies won by 8 wickets
National Cricket Stadium, Grenada
Umpires: Patrick Gustard (WI) and Leslie Reifer (WI)
Player of the match: Evin Lewis (WI)

- West Indies won the toss and elected to field.
- Temba Bavuma captained South Africa for the first time in T20Is.
- Evin Lewis (WI) scored his 1,000th run in T20Is.

=== 2nd T20I ===
27 June 2021
14:00
Scorecard

South Africa; 166/7 (20 overs)	v	West Indies; 150/9 (20 overs)
Temba Bavuma 46 (33); Obed McCoy 3/25 (4 overs)		Andre Fletcher 35 (36); Kagiso Rabada 3/37 (4 overs)

South Africa won by 16 runs
National Cricket Stadium, Grenada
Umpires: Gregory Brathwaite (WI) and Nigel Duguid (WI)
Player of the match: George Linde (SA)

- West Indies won the toss and elected to field.

=== 3rd T20I ===
29 June 2021
14:00
Scorecard

South Africa; 167/8 (20 overs)	v	West Indies; 166/7 (20 overs)
Quinton de Kock 72 (51); Obed McCoy 4/22 (4 overs)		Evin Lewis 27 (21); Tabraiz Shamsi 2/13 (4 overs)

South Africa won by 1 run
National Cricket Stadium, Grenada
Umpires: Nigel Duguid (WI) and Joel Wilson (WI)
Player of the match: Tabraiz Shamsi (SA)

- West Indies won the toss and elected to field.
- Quinton de Kock (SA) played in his 50th T20I.

=== 4th T20I ===
1 July 2021
14:00
Scorecard

West Indies; 167/6 (20 overs)	v	South Africa; 146/9 (20 overs)
Kieron Pollard 51* (25); Tabraiz Shamsi 2/13 (4 overs)		Quinton de Kock 60 (43); Dwayne Bravo 4/19 (4 overs)

West Indies won by 21 runs
National Cricket Stadium, Grenada
Umpires: Patrick Gustard (WI) and Leslie Reifer (WI)
Player of the match: Kieron Pollard (WI)

- South Africa won the toss and elected to field.

=== 5th T20I ===
3 July 2021
14:00
Scorecard

South Africa; 168/4 (20 overs)	v	West Indies; 143/9 (20 overs)
Aiden Markram 70 (48); Fidel Edwards 2/19 (3 overs)		Evin Lewis 52 (34); Lungi Ngidi 3/32 (4 overs)

South Africa won by 25 runs
National Cricket Stadium, Grenada
Umpires: Gregory Brathwaite (WI) and Joel Wilson (WI)
Player of the match: Aiden Markram (SA)

- South Africa won the toss and elected to bat.
- Akeal Hosein (WI) made his T20I debut.
