= Goolam =

Goolam is a given name. Notable people with the given name include:

- Goolam Essaji Vahanvati (1949–2014), Indian senior counsel
- Goolam Rajah (1946–2021), South African cricket administrator
