= Australian cricket team in Bangladesh in 2020 =

International cricket tour

| | Bangladesh | Australia |
- Dates: 11 June – 23 June 2020

Test series

The Australian cricket team were scheduled to tour Bangladesh in June 2020 to play two Test matches. The Test series would have formed part of the inaugural 2019–2021 ICC World Test Championship. In September 2019, the Bangladesh Cricket Board (BCB) and Cricket Australia confirmed that the series would go ahead.

Originally a three-match Twenty20 International (T20I) series was scheduled to take place in October 2019, with the Test series being played in February 2020. However, the Test series was moved to June 2020, due to fixture congestion. The T20I series is now scheduled to take place ahead of the 2021 ICC T20 World Cup, with the dates to be agreed. The dates and venues for the two Test matches were confirmed in March 2020.

However, on 9 April 2020, the matches were postponed due to the COVID-19 pandemic. In July 2020, the International Cricket Council (ICC) confirmed it was their priority to reschedule the matches, along with the five other World Test Championship series that had been postponed due to the pandemic.

The series was then effectively cancelled due to the 2019-2021 World test championship window being crossed. Since then the teams have played against each other multiple times and will be playing the next match in 2026 which will be happening in Australia.

== Tour match ==
=== Four-day match: TBC vs Australia ===
June 2020

| TBC | v | Australia |

Cancelled

== Test series ==
=== 1st Test ===
11–15 June 2020
Scorecard

| Bangladesh | v | Australia |

Cancelled
Zohur Ahmed Chowdhury Stadium, Chittagong

=== 2nd Test ===
19–23 June 2020
Scorecard

| Bangladesh | v | Australia |

Cancelled
Sher-e-Bangla National Cricket Stadium, Dhaka
