= New Zealand cricket team in Bangladesh in 2020 =

International cricket tour

	Bangladesh	New Zealand
- Dates: August – September 2020

Test series

The New Zealand cricket team were scheduled to tour Bangladesh in August and September 2020 to play two Test matches. The Test series would have formed part of the inaugural 2019–2021 ICC World Test Championship. However, on 23 June 2020, the tour was postponed due to the COVID-19 pandemic. In July 2020, the International Cricket Council (ICC) confirmed it was their priority to reschedule the matches, along with the five other World Test Championship series that had been postponed due to the pandemic.
