= Australian cricket team in South Africa in 2023 =

International cricket tour

Australia men's cricket team in South Africa in 2023
	South Africa	Australia
- Dates: 30 August 2023 – 17 September 2023
Captains	Temba Bavuma (ODIs) (Note: Aiden Markram captained South Africa in the 4th ODI.); Aiden Markram (T20Is)	Mitchell Marsh

One Day International series
- Results: South Africa won the 5-match series 3–2
Most runs	Heinrich Klaasen (243)	Marnus Labuschagne (283)
Most wickets	Marco Jansen (8); Keshav Maharaj (8)	Adam Zampa (8)
- Player of the series: Aiden Markram (SA)

Twenty20 International series
- Results: Australia won the 3-match series 3–0
Most runs	Reeza Hendricks (101)	Mitchell Marsh (186)
Most wickets	Lizaad Williams (4)	Sean Abbott (8)
- Player of the series: Mitchell Marsh (Aus)

The Australia men's cricket team toured South Africa in August and September 2023 to play five One Day Internationals (ODI) and three Twenty20 Internationals (T20I) matches. The ODI matches formed part of both teams' preparations for the 2023 ICC Men's Cricket World Cup (which Australia won).

Originally, the tour was scheduled to take place in March 2021, and three Test matches were slated to be played. Those matches would have formed part of the 2019–2021 ICC World Test Championship tournament. However, that tour was postponed in February 2021 due to the COVID-19 pandemic.

== Background ==
In December 2020, South Africa's One Day International (ODI) series against England was postponed due to the COVID-19 pandemic. As a result, both cricket boards were looking at contingency plans for the Test series, including the possibility of playing the matches in Perth or the United Arab Emirates. An initial provisional start date for the tour of 18 February 2021 meant a tight turnaround from the end of South Africa's tour of Pakistan, although an update in January suggested the tour would begin in March 2021.

On 27 January 2021, Cricket Australia (CA) named their squad for the tour, ahead of any confirmation of the dates of the fixtures. However, on 2 February 2021, Cricket Australia announced that the tour had been postponed due to the pandemic. As a result of the tour being postponed, New Zealand qualified for the final of the 2019–2021 ICC World Test Championship. In October 2021, Cricket Australia said that they were looking at a window in 2023 to play the white-ball matches.

== Squads ==
South Africa		Australia	
ODIs	T20Is	ODIs	T20Is
Temba Bavuma (c); Dewald Brevis; Gerald Coetzee; Quinton de Kock (wk); Bjorn Fortuin; Reeza Hendricks; Marco Jansen; Heinrich Klaasen; Sisanda Magala; Keshav Maharaj; Aiden Markram; David Miller; Lungi Ngidi; Anrich Nortje; Wayne Parnell; Kagiso Rabada; Tabraiz Shamsi; Tristan Stubbs (wk); Rassie van der Dussen	Aiden Markram (c); Temba Bavuma; Matthew Breetzke (wk); Dewald Brevis; Gerald Coetzee; Donovan Ferreira (wk); Bjorn Fortuin; Reeza Hendricks; Marco Jansen; Sisanda Magala; Keshav Maharaj; Lungi Ngidi; Tabraiz Shamsi; Tristan Stubbs (wk); Rassie van der Dussen; Lizaad Williams	Mitchell Marsh (c); Sean Abbott; Ashton Agar; Alex Carey (wk); Pat Cummins; Tim David; Nathan Ellis; Cameron Green; Aaron Hardie; Josh Hazlewood; Travis Head; Josh Inglis (wk); Spencer Johnson; Marnus Labuschagne; ~~Glenn Maxwell~~; Tanveer Sangha; ~~Steve Smith~~; ~~Mitchell Starc~~; Marcus Stoinis; David Warner; Adam Zampa; Michael Neser	Mitchell Marsh (c); Sean Abbott; Jason Behrendorff; Tim David; Nathan Ellis; Aaron Hardie; Travis Head; Josh Inglis (wk); Spencer Johnson; ~~Glenn Maxwell~~; Tanveer Sangha; Matthew Short; ~~Steve Smith~~; Marcus Stoinis; Ashton Turner; Matthew Wade (wk); Adam Zampa

On 18 August 2023, Australia's Steve Smith and Mitchell Starc were ruled out of tour due to injuries. Ashton Turner replaced Smith in the T20I squad, whereas Marnus Labuschagne and Spencer Johnson replaced Smith and Starc respectively in the ODI squad. On the same day, Mitchell Marsh replaced Pat Cummins as Australia's ODI captain for the tour, with Cummins' participation in doubt as he was returning from a wrist injury. Initially, Glenn Maxwell was set to miss the ODI series to return home for the birth of his first child. However, he was also ruled out of the T20I series due to an injury and was replaced by Matthew Wade in the Australia's T20I squad. On the day of first T20I, Tanveer Sangha was added to Australia's T20I Squad, after Adam Zampa couldn't play due to illness. On 31 August 2023, Tim David was added to Australia's ODI squad. On 10 September 2023, Michael Neser was added to Australia's ODI squad.

== T20I series ==
=== 1st T20I ===
30 August 2023
18:00 (N)
Scorecard

Australia; 226/6 (20 overs)	v	South Africa; 115 (15.3 overs)
Mitchell Marsh 92* (49); Lizaad Williams 3/44 (4 overs)		Reeza Hendricks 56 (43); Tanveer Sangha 4/31 (4 overs)

Australia won by 111 runs
Kingsmead Cricket Ground, Durban
Umpires: Lubabalo Gcuma (SA) and Bongani Jele (SA)
Player of the match: Mitchell Marsh (Aus)

- South Africa won the toss and elected to field.
- Dewald Brevis, Gerald Coetzee (SA), Aaron Hardie, Spencer Johnson, Tanveer Sangha and Matthew Short (Aus) all made their T20I debuts.
- This was Australia's highest team total against South Africa in men's T20Is.

=== 2nd T20I ===
1 September 2023
18:00 (N)
Scorecard

South Africa; 164/8 (20 overs)	v	Australia; 165/2 (14.5 overs)
Aiden Markram 49 (39); Sean Abbott 3/22 (4 overs)		Mitchell Marsh 76* (39); Lizaad Williams 1/17 (2 overs)

Australia won by 8 wickets
Kingsmead Cricket Ground, Durban
Umpires: Stephen Harris (SA) and Allahudien Paleker (SA)
Player of the match: Sean Abbott (Aus)

- Australia won the toss and elected to field.

=== 3rd T20I ===
3 September 2023
14:00
Scorecard

South Africa; 190/8 (20 overs)	v	Australia; 191/5 (17.5 overs)
Donovan Ferreira 48 (21); Sean Abbott 4/31 (4 overs)		Travis Head 91 (48); Bjorn Fortuin 2/36 (4 overs)

Australia won by 5 wickets
Kingsmead Cricket Ground, Durban
Umpires: Bongani Jele (SA) and Allahudien Paleker (SA)
Player of the match: Travis Head (Aus)

- South Africa won the toss and elected to bat.
- Matthew Breetzke ‍and Donovan Ferreira (SA) both made their T20I debuts.

== ODI series ==
=== 1st ODI ===
7 September 2023
13:00 (D/N)
Scorecard

South Africa; 222 (49 overs)	v	Australia; 225/7 (40.2 overs)
Temba Bavuma 114* (142); Josh Hazlewood 3/41 (10 overs)		Marnus Labuschagne 80* (93); Kagiso Rabada 2/38 (8 overs)

Australia won by 3 wickets
Mangaung Oval, Bloemfontein
Umpires: Richard Kettleborough (Eng) and Allahudien Paleker (SA)
Player of the match: Marnus Labuschagne (Aus)

- Australia won the toss and elected to field.
- Marnus Labuschagne (Aus) replaced Cameron Green as a concussion substitute during the second innings of the match.

=== 2nd ODI ===
9 September 2023
13:00 (D/N)
Scorecard

Australia; 392/8 (50 overs)	v	South Africa; 269 (41.5 overs)
Marnus Labuschagne 124 (99); Tabraiz Shamsi 4/61 (10 overs)		Heinrich Klaasen 49 (36); Adam Zampa 4/48 (9 overs)

Australia won by 123 runs
Mangaung Oval, Bloemfontein
Umpires: Bongani Jele (SA) and Nitin Menon (Ind)
Player of the match: Marnus Labuschagne (Aus)

- South Africa won the toss and elected to field.
- Tim David and Aaron Hardie (Aus) both made their ODI debuts.
- David Warner scored his 46th international century, the most by any opener.

=== 3rd ODI ===
12 September 2023
13:00 (D/N)
Scorecard

South Africa; 338/6 (50 overs)	v	Australia; 227 (34.3 overs)
Aiden Markram 102* (74); Travis Head 2/39 (10 overs)		David Warner 78 (56); Gerald Coetzee 4/50 (6.3 overs)

South Africa won by 111 runs
JB Marks Oval, Potchefstroom
Umpires: Bongani Jele (SA) and Richard Kettleborough (Eng)
Player of the match: Aiden Markram (SA)

- Australia won the toss and elected to field.
- Tanveer Sangha (Aus) made his ODI debut.

=== 4th ODI ===
15 September 2023
13:00 (D/N)
Scorecard

South Africa; 416/5 (50 overs)	v	Australia; 252 (34.5 overs)
Heinrich Klaasen 174 (83); Josh Hazlewood 2/79 (10 overs)		Alex Carey 99 (77); Lungi Ngidi 4/51 (8 overs)

South Africa won by 164 runs
Centurion Park, Centurion
Umpires: Nitin Menon (Ind) and Allahudien Paleker (SA)
Player of the match: Heinrich Klaasen (SA)

- Australia won the toss and elected to field.
- Adam Zampa (Aus) equalled the record for most runs conceded in an ODI (113).

=== 5th ODI ===
17 September 2023
10:00
Scorecard

South Africa; 315/9 (50 overs)	v	Australia; 193 (34.1 overs)
Aiden Markram 93 (87); Adam Zampa 3/71 (10 overs)		Mitchell Marsh 71 (56); Marco Jansen 5/39 (8 overs)

South Africa won by 122 runs
Wanderers Stadium, Johannesburg
Umpires: Richard Kettleborough (Eng) and Allahudien Paleker (SA)
Player of the match: Marco Jansen (SA)

- Australia won the toss and elected to field.
- Marco Jansen (SA) took his first five-wicket haul in ODIs.
