= Bhanuka =

Bhanuka is a given name and surname. Notable people with the name include:

- Bhanuka Rajapaksa (born 1991), Sri Lankan cricketer
- Minod Bhanuka (born 1995), Sri Lankan cricketer
