= Sri Lankan cricket team in South Africa in 2020–21 =

International cricket tour

	South Africa	Sri Lanka
- Dates: 26 December 2020 – 7 January 2021
Captains	Quinton de Kock	Dimuth Karunaratne

Test series
- Result: South Africa won the 2-match series 2–0
Most runs	Dean Elgar (253)	Kusal Perera (141)
Most wickets	Anrich Nortje (11)	Vishwa Fernando (8)
- Player of the series: Dean Elgar (SA)

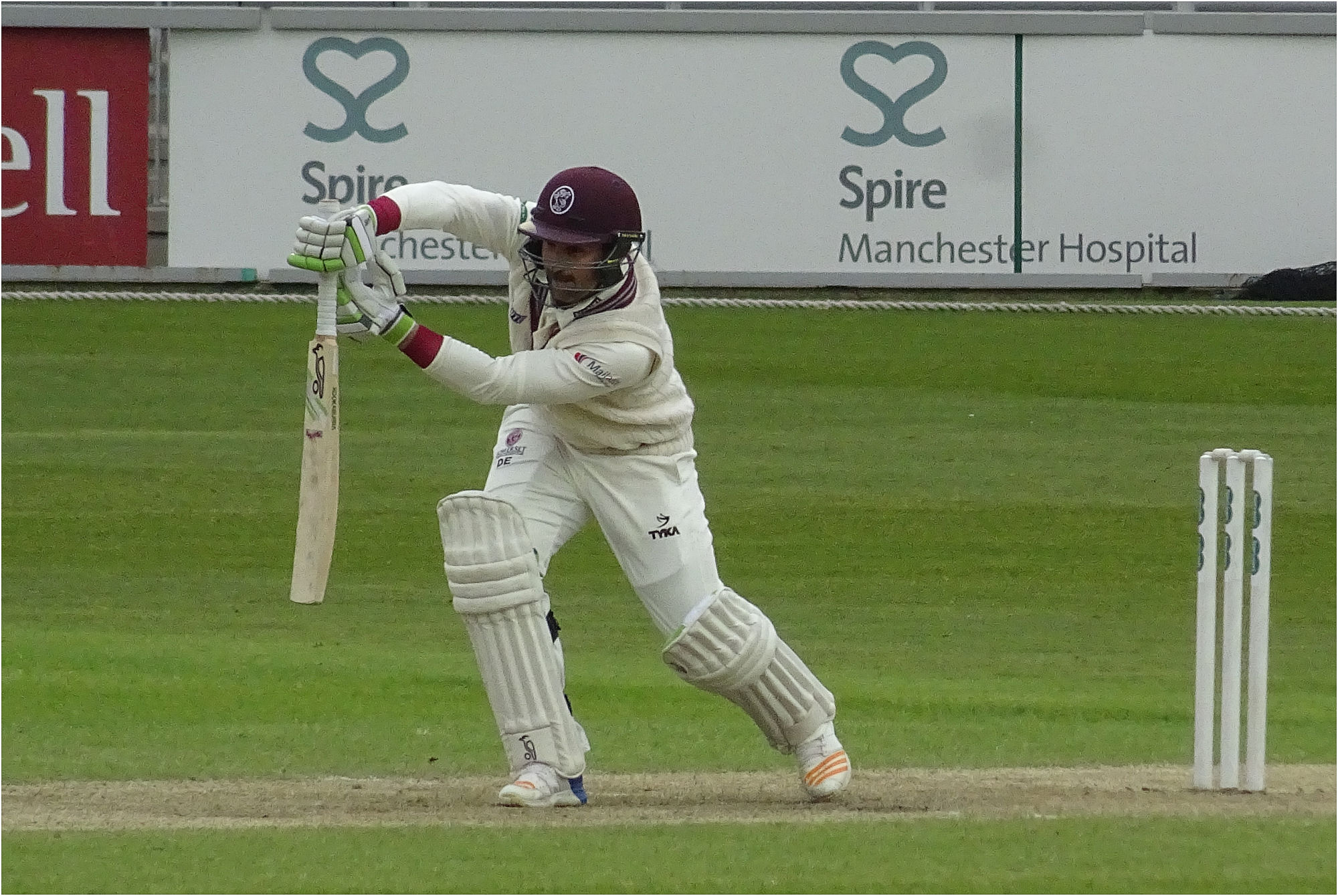
Dean Elgar, 2017

The Sri Lanka cricket team toured South Africa in December 2020 and January 2021 to play two Test matches. The Test series formed part of the inaugural 2019–2021 ICC World Test Championship. Ahead of the tour, Quinton de Kock was named as the Test captain of South Africa's side.

In December 2020, South Africa's One Day International (ODI) against England was postponed due to the COVID-19 pandemic. As a result, Sri Lanka Cricket (SLC) did look at the possibility of playing the series in Sri Lanka, or withdrawing from touring South Africa. However, after discussions between both cricket boards, Sri Lanka Cricket's medical staff said they were pleased with the bio-security arrangements.

South Africa won the first Test by an innings and 45 runs, with Faf du Plessis scoring a career-best 199 runs. South Africa won the second Test by ten wickets winning the series 2–0.

== Squads ==
Tests
South Africa	Sri Lanka
Quinton de Kock (c, wk); Temba Bavuma; Aiden Markram; Faf du Plessis; Sarel Erwee; Beuran Hendricks; Dean Elgar; Keshav Maharaj; Wiaan Mulder; Lungi Ngidi; Anrich Nortje; ~~Keegan Petersen~~; Dwaine Pretorius; Migael Pretorius; Kagiso Rabada; Lutho Sipamla; Glenton Stuurman; Rassie van der Dussen; Raynard van Tonder; Kyle Verreynne	Dimuth Karunaratne (c); Minod Bhanuka; Dushmantha Chameera; Dinesh Chandimal; Dhananjaya de Silva; Niroshan Dickwella (wk); Lasith Embuldeniya; Asitha Fernando; Oshada Fernando; Vishwa Fernando; Santhush Gunathilake; Wanindu Hasaranga; Lahiru Kumara; Suranga Lakmal; Dilshan Madushanka; ~~Angelo Mathews~~; Kusal Mendis; Dilruwan Perera; Kusal Perera (wk); Kasun Rajitha; Dasun Shanaka; Lahiru Thirimanne

Angelo Mathews was ruled out of Sri Lanka's squad after suffering an injury during the semi-finals of the 2020 Lanka Premier League tournament. On 16 December 2020, Migael Pretorius was added to South Africa's Test squad. Two days later, Dwaine Pretorius, Raynard van Tonder and Lutho Sipamla were also added to South Africa's squad. On 22 December 2020, Beuran Hendricks and Keegan Petersen were withdrawn from South Africa's squad, after both players tested positive for COVID-19. On the first day of the first Test, Dhananjaya de Silva suffered a grade two tear in left thigh, and was ruled out of Sri Lanka's squad for the rest of the tour. On 28 December 2020, Kagiso Rabada was added to South Africa's squad for the second Test. Two days later, Beuran Hendricks was reinstated to South Africa's squad for the second Test, with Migael Pretorius being released due to a shoulder injury.

== Test series ==
=== 1st Test ===
26–30 December 2020 (Note: While five days of play were scheduled for each Test, the first Test reached a result in four days, and the second Test reached a result in three days.)
Scorecard

Sri Lanka	v	South Africa
396 (96 overs); Dinesh Chandimal 85 (161); Lutho Sipamla 4/76 (16 overs)		621 (142.1 overs); Faf du Plessis 199 (276); Wanindu Hasaranga 4/171 (45 overs)
180 (46.1 overs); Kusal Perera 64 (87); Lutho Sipamla 2/24 (5 overs)

South Africa won by an innings and 45 runs
Centurion Park, Centurion
Umpires: Marais Erasmus (SA) and Adrian Holdstock (SA)
Player of the match: Faf du Plessis (SA)

- Sri Lanka won the toss and elected to bat.
- Lutho Sipamla (SA) and Wanindu Hasaranga (SL) both made their Test debuts.
- Quinton de Kock captained South Africa for the first time in Tests.
- Adrian Holdstock (SA) stood in his first Test as an on-field umpire.
- Kusal Mendis (SL) scored his 3,000th run in Tests.
- Faf du Plessis (SA) scored his 4,000th run and his tenth century in Tests.
- World Test Championship points: South Africa 60, Sri Lanka 0.

=== 2nd Test ===
3–7 January 2021
Scorecard

Sri Lanka	v	South Africa
157 (40.3 overs); Kusal Perera 60 (67); Anrich Nortje 6/56 (14.3 overs)		302 (75.4 overs); Dean Elgar 127 (163); Vishwa Fernando 5/101 (23.4 overs)
211 (56.5 overs); Dimuth Karunaratne 103 (128); Lungi Ngidi 4/44 (15 overs)		67/0 (13.2 overs); Aiden Markram 36* (53)

South Africa won by 10 wickets
Wanderers Stadium, Johannesburg
Umpires: Marais Erasmus (SA) and Adrian Holdstock (SA)
Player of the match: Dean Elgar (SA)

- Sri Lanka won the toss and elected to bat.
- Minod Bhanuka and Asitha Fernando (SL) both made their Test debuts.
- Dean Elgar (SA) scored his 4,000th run in Tests.
- Vishwa Fernando (SL) took his first five-wicket haul in Tests.
- Niroshan Dickwella (SL) scored his 2,000th run in Tests.
- World Test Championship points: South Africa 60, Sri Lanka 0.
