= 2027–2029 World Test Championship =

Fourth edition of World Test Championship

2027–2029 ICC World Test Championship
- Dates: 18 June 2027 – June 2029
- Administrator: International Cricket Council
- Cricket format: Test cricket
- Tournament format(s): League and Final
- Participants: 9
- Matches: 20*
- Official website: ICC World Test Championship

The 2027–2029 ICC World Test Championship will be the fifth edition of the ICC World Test Championship.

== Format ==
The tournament consists of 9 teams playing in the league stage. The top two teams in the points table advance to the final. Each team plays six series, three at home and three away, with each series containing two to five Test matches.

The points system is unchanged from the previous edition. A win is worth all 12 points, a tie is worth 6 points each, a draw is worth 4 points each, and a loss is worth 0 points. A team that is behind the required over rate at the end of a match would have one point deducted for each over it was behind (over rate deduction doesn't applied when the team all out the opponent within 80 overs) . As in the previous edition, teams are ranked in the league table based on the percentage of total points won out of total points contested.

In the event that this percentage is tied between teams, a series of tiebreaker criteria are used to determine the standings of teams, starting with the number of series wins, followed by each team's percentage in away matches, and finally the ICC Test Rankings at the end of the league stage.

Points system
Match result	Points earned	Points contested	Percentage of points won
Win	12	12	100
Tie	6	12	50
Draw	4	12	33.33
Loss	0	12	0

Points available per series
Matches in series	Total points available
2	24
3	36
4	48
5	60

== Participants ==
The nine full members of the ICC who will participate are:

- Australia
- Bangladesh
- England
- India
- New Zealand
- Pakistan
- South Africa
- Sri Lanka
- West Indies

The three full members of the ICC who may or may not participate are Afghanistan, Ireland, and Zimbabwe.

== Schedule ==
Home \ Away	AUS	BAN	ENG	IND	NZ	PAK	SA	SL	WI
Australia	—	—	—	5 matches	—	3 matches	—	2 matches	—
Bangladesh	—	—	—	—	—	—	—	—	—
England	5 matches	—	—	—	—	—	—	—	—
India	—	—	5 matches	—	TBD	—	—	—	—
New Zealand	—	—	—	—	—	—	—	—	—
Pakistan	—	—	—	—	—	—	—	—	—
South Africa	—	—	—	TBD	—	—	—	—	—
Sri Lanka	—	—	—	—	—	—	—	—	—
West Indies	—	—	—	—	—	—	—	—	—

Updated to match(es) played on unknown. Source: ICC Men's FTP. The numbers in square brackets are the number of matches in the series.
Legend: Blue = home team win; Yellow = draw; Red = away team win.

Team	Scheduled matches			Not scheduled to play against
Team	Total	Home	Away	Not scheduled to play against
Australia	19*	Pakistan(3); Sri Lanka(2); India(5)	England(5); Bangladesh(2); New Zealand(2)	South Africa West Indies
Bangladesh	6*	Australia(2); Sri Lanka(2); New Zealand(2)		
England	10*	Australia (5)	India (5)	
India	10*	England (5); New Zealand (TBD)	Australia (5); South Africa (TBD)	Pakistan
New Zealand	4*	Australia(2)	India (TBD); Bangladesh(2)	
Pakistan	3*		Australia (3)	India
South Africa	–	India (TBD)		Australia
Sri Lanka	4*		Australia (2); Bangladesh(2)	
West Indies	–			Australia

=== Test series statistics ===
Pos.	Team	Test Series			
Pos.	Team	Series	Win	Lost	Drawn
1	Australia	–	–	–	–
2	Bangladesh	–	–	–	–
3	England	–	–	–	–
4	Pakistan	–	–	–	–
5	India	–	–	–	–
6	New Zealand	–	–	–	–
7	South Africa	–	–	–	–
8	Sri Lanka	–	–	–	–
9	West Indies	–	–	–	–

== League table ==
Pos	Team	Pld	W	L	D	T	Ded	Con	Pts	Pct	Qualification
1	Australia	0	0	0	0	0					2029 World Test Championship final
2	Bangladesh	0	0	0	0	0					2029 World Test Championship final
3	England	0	0	0	0	0					
4	India	0	0	0	0	0					
5	New Zealand	0	0	0	0	0					
6	Pakistan	0	0	0	0	0					
7	South Africa	0	0	0	0	0					
8	Sri Lanka	0	0	0	0	0					
9	West Indies	0	0	0	0	0					

Updated to match(es) played on unknown. Source:

The ranking of teams in the league stage is determined as follows:
1. Points Percentage in all matches;
2. Number of Series wins;
3. Points Percentage in away matches;
4. ICC Test Rankings

== League stage ==
=== 2027 ===
==== The Ashes (England v Australia) ====
18 – 22 June 2027

England	v	Australia

Trent Bridge, Nottingham

30 June – 04 July 2027

England	v	Australia

Lord's, London

08 – 12 July 2027

England	v	Australia

Edgbaston, Birmingham

21 – 25 July 2027

England	v	Australia

Rose Bowl, Southampton

29 July – 02 August 2027

England	v	Australia

The Oval, London

=== 2027-28 ===
==== Benaud–Qadir Trophy (Australia vs Pakistan) ====
17 – 21 December 2027

Australia	v	Pakistan

Adelaide Oval, Adelaide

26 – 30 December 2027

Australia	v	Pakistan

Melbourne Cricket Ground, Melbourne

04 – 08 January 2028

Australia	v	Pakistan

Sydney Cricket Ground, Sydney

==== Freedom Trophy (South Africa v India) ====
December 2027

South Africa	v	India

TBD, TBD

==== Warne–Muralidaran Trophy (Australia vs Sri Lanka) ====
January 2028

Australia	v	Sri Lanka

TBD, TBD

January 2028

Australia	v	Sri Lanka

TBD, TBD

==== Anderson–Tendulkar Trophy (India v England) ====
January 2028

India	v	England

TBD, TBD

TBD 2028

India	v	England

TBD, TBD

TBD 2028

India	v	England

TBD, TBD

TBD 2028

India	v	England

TBD, TBD

TBD 2028

India	v	England

TBD, TBD

=== 2028-29 ===
==== Border–Gavaskar Trophy (Australia v India) ====
December 2028

Australia	v	India

TBD, TBD

December 2028

Australia	v	India

TBD, TBD

January 2029

Australia	v	India

TBD, TBD

January 2029

Australia	v	India

TBD, TBD

January 2029

Australia	v	India

TBD, TBD

== Final match ==
8–12 June 2029

TBD	v	TBD

TBD, England
