= 2019–2021 World Test Championship =

Inaugural edition of World Test Championship

2019–2021 ICC World Test Championship
- Dates: 1 August 2019 – 23 June 2021
- Administrator: International Cricket Council
- Cricket format: Test cricket
- Tournament format(s): League and Final
- Champions: New Zealand (1st title)
- Runners-up: India
- Participants: 9
- Matches: 61
- Most runs: (Australia) Marnus Labuschagne (1675)
- Most wickets: (India) Ravichandran Ashwin (71)
- Official website: icc-cricket.com/world-test-championship

The 2019–2021 ICC World Test Championship was the inaugural edition of the ICC World Test Championship of Test cricket. It started on 1 August 2019 with the first Test of the 2019 Ashes series, and it finished with the final at the Rose Bowl, Southampton in June 2021.

It came nearly a decade after the International Cricket Council (ICC) first approved the idea for a World Test Championship in 2010, and following two cancelled attempts to hold the inaugural competition in 2013 and 2017.

It featured nine of the twelve Test playing nations, each of whom was scheduled to play a Test series against six of the other eight teams. Each series consisted of between two and five matches, so although all teams were to play six series (three at home and three away), they were not scheduled to play the same number of Tests. Each team were able to score a maximum of 120 points from each series and the two teams with the most points at the end of the league stage would contest the final. In the case of a draw or a tie in the final, the two teams playing the final would be declared joint champions. However, the COVID-19 pandemic impacted on the Championship, with several rounds of matches being postponed or cancelled. In November 2020, the ICC announced that the finalists would be decided by percentage of points earned.

Some of the Test series in this Championship were part of a longer ongoing series, such as the 2019 Ashes series. Also, some of these nine teams would play additional Test matches during this period which were not part of this Championship, as part of the ICC Future Tours Programme for 2018–23, mainly to give games to the three Test playing teams not taking part in this competition. On 29 July 2019, the ICC officially launched the World Test Championship.

On 2 February 2021, due to the COVID-19 pandemic, Australia postponed their away series against South Africa, resulting in a guaranteed berth in the final for New Zealand. On 6 March 2021, India also confirmed their berth for the final, after beating England by 3–1 in a home Test series. The final saw New Zealand win by eight wickets, securing their second global cricket title after their 2000 ICC KnockOut Trophy win.

== Format ==
The tournament was played over two years. Each team were scheduled to play six other opponents, three at home and three away. Each series consisted of between two and five Test matches. Therefore, all participants did not play the same number of Tests, but played the same number of series. At the end of the league stage the top two teams played in the final. Each match is scheduled for a duration of five days.

=== Point scoring ===
The ICC decided that the same number of points would be available from each series, regardless of series length, so that countries that played fewer Tests were not disadvantaged. It also decided that points would not be awarded for series results, but for match results only. These would be split equally between all the matches in the series, regardless of whether or not a match was a dead rubber, so that every match counted. In a five-match series, therefore, 20% of the points would be available each match, while in a two-match series, 50% of the points would be available each match.

Therefore, depending on whether the series is 2, 3, 4 or 5 matches long, the number of points awarded for a single match win would be a half, a third, a quarter, or a fifth of the maximum possible from the series. The ICC also decided that a tie should be worth half of a win and that a draw should be worth a third of a win. This all meant that after each match, a team could be awarded a half, a third, a quarter, a fifth, a sixth, an eighth, a ninth, a tenth, a twelfth or a fifteenth of the total points available from the series, depending on the result and how many matches the series happened to consist of. Ultimately, this meant a figure for the total points available from the series needs to be picked very carefully, as not many numbers give all integers when split into all these different fractions (360 does). Being a highly composite number, when 120 was split into all these fractions, an integer was obtained in all cases except one – the points awarded for a draw in a 3-match series should be 13 1/3 (a third of a third of 120), but the 1/3 had been dropped.

Each series would therefore carry a maximum of 120 points with points distributed as follows:

Distributions of points in ICC World Test Championship
Matches in series	Points for a win	Points for a tie	Points for a draw	Points for a defeat
2	60	30	20	0
3	40	20	13	0
4	30	15	10	0
5	24	12	8	0

A team that was behind the required over rate at the end of a match would have two competition points deducted for each over it was behind. In January 2020, South Africa became the first team to be docked World Test Championship points, after a slow over-rate in the fourth Test against England.

== Participants ==
Nine full members of the ICC participated in the competition:

- Australia
- Bangladesh
- England
- India
- New Zealand
- Pakistan
- South Africa
- Sri Lanka
- West Indies

Since each team played only six of the eight possible opponents, the ICC announced that India and Pakistan would not play against each other in the first and second editions of the tournament due to the ongoing political issues between the two countries.

The three full members of the ICC who did not participate were Afghanistan, Ireland and Zimbabwe. These were the three lowest ranked full members of the ICC. They had been included in the ICC Future Tours Programme and played a number of Test matches during this period against Championship participants and each other (Note: Ireland, Afghanistan and Zimbabwe, like the nine Championship participants, were not able to add further fixtures outside the FTP, including Test matches.) but these did not have bearing on the Championship (Note: the Netherlands were also included on the FTP as a one-day and T20-playing nation only.)

== Schedule ==
The schedule for the World Test Championship was announced by the ICC on 20 June 2018, as part of the 2018–2023 Future Tours Programme.

Rather than being a full round-robin tournament in which everyone played everyone else equally, each team played only six of the other eight.

Home \ Away	AUS	BAN	ENG	IND	NZL	PAK	RSA	SRI	WIN
Australia	—	—	—	1–2 [4]	3–0 [3]	2–0 [2]	—	—	—
Bangladesh	Cancelled [2]	—	—	—	Cancelled [2]	—	—	—	0–2 [2]
England	2–2 [5]	—	—	—	—	1–0 [3]	—	—	2–1 [3]
India	—	2–0 [2]	3–1 [4]	—	—	—	3–0 [3]	—	
New Zealand	—	—	—	2–0 [2]	—	2–0 [2]	—	—	2–0 [2]
Pakistan	—	1–0 [1]*	—	—	—	—	2–0 [2]	1–0 [2]	—
South Africa	Cancelled [3]	—	1–3 [4]	—	—	—	—	2–0 [2]	—
Sri Lanka	—	1–0 [2]	0–2 [2]	—	1–1 [2]	—	—	—	—
West Indies	—	—	—	0–2 [2]	—	—	0–2 [2]	0–0 [2]	—

Source: icc-cricket The numbers in square brackets are the numbers of matches in the series.
Legend: Blue = home team win; Yellow = draw; Red = away team win.

Therefore, the total number of matches played by each team (home and away) in this tournament, and the two countries that each team did not face in this tournament, were as follows. (Note: This was not the total Test matches played by each team during this period, as some countries did play further matches during this period which were not part of this Championship, as part of the ICC Future Tours Programme for 2018–23. Some of these may be against the opponents they did not play in this Championship.)

Team	Scheduled matches			Not scheduled to play against	
Team	Total	Home	Away	Not scheduled to play against	
Australia	19	9	10	Sri Lanka	West Indies
Bangladesh	12	6	6	England	South Africa
England	21	11	10	Bangladesh	New Zealand
India	17	9	8	Pakistan	Sri Lanka
New Zealand	13	6	7	England	South Africa
Pakistan	13	6	7	India	West Indies
South Africa	16	9	7	Bangladesh	New Zealand
Sri Lanka	12	6	6	Australia	India
West Indies	13	6	7	Australia	Pakistan

All the series were mutually agreed between the two nations involved; this had led to allegations that the schedule has been agreed based on what would provide the biggest television audiences, and therefore television receipts, rather than selecting an even spread of teams.

Since each team played a different set of opponents, they can be considered as having an easier or harder schedules.

=== COVID-19 pandemic ===
The COVID-19 pandemic impacted on international cricket fixtures, including matches in the Championship. In March 2020, the second Test match between Pakistan and Bangladesh was postponed due to the pandemic. Later the same month, the two-match series between Sri Lanka and England was also postponed. The following month saw Australia's tour to Bangladesh and the West Indies tour to England being postponed. In June 2020, the two-match series between Bangladesh and New Zealand and the three-match series between Sri Lanka and Bangladesh were both postponed. South Africa's tour of the West Indies was postponed, after the fixtures clashed with the West Indies rescheduled tour to England.

On 29 July 2020, the ICC confirmed that their attention had moved to the fixtures in the World Test Championship, with their priority on rescheduling the six Test series that had been postponed. The ICC ultimately accepted several series would not take place as part of the Championship and changed the points system to account for the variation in the number of series played per side.

== Prize money ==
The International Cricket Council declared a total prize money pool of US$3.8 million for the tournament. The prize money was allocated according to the performance of the team as follows:

Position	Prize money (US$)
Winner	$1,600,000
Runner-up	$800,000
Third	$450,000
Fourth	$350,000
Fifth	$200,000
Sixth	$100,000
Seventh	$100,000
Eighth	$100,000
Ninth	$100,000
Total	$3,800,000

The winning team also got the ICC Test Championship Mace, previously presented to the top team in ICC Men's Test Team Rankings at the April cutoff-date of a year between 2003 and 2019.

== League table ==
Pos	Team	Pld	W	L	D	T	Ded	Con	Pts	Pct	Qualification
1	India	17	12	4	1	0	0	720	520	72.2	2021 World Test Championship final
2	New Zealand (C)	11	7	4	0	0	0	600	420	70	2021 World Test Championship final
3	Australia	14	8	4	2	0	4	480	332	69.2 (Note: Australia were deducted 4 points for a slow over rate in the second Test against India on 29 December 2020.)	
4	England	21	11	7	3	0	0	720	442	61.4	
5	South Africa	13	5	8	0	0	6	600	264	44 (Note: South Africa were deducted 6 points for a slow over rate in the fourth Test against England on 27 January 2020.)	
6	Pakistan	12	4	5	3	8	0	660	286	43.3	
7	Sri Lanka	12	2	6	4	0	0	720	200	27.8	
8	West Indies	13	3	8	2	0	6	720	194	26.9 (Note: West Indies were deducted 6 points for a slow over rate in the second Test against South Africa on 22 June 2021.)	
9	Bangladesh	7	0	6	1	0	0	420	20	4.8	

Source: International Cricket Council, ESPNcricinfo

== League stage ==
=== 2019 ===
==== The Ashes (England v Australia) ====
1–5 August 2019
Scorecard

Australia; 284 (80.4 overs) & 487/7d (112 overs)	v	England; 374 (135.5 overs) & 146 (52.3 overs)

Australia won by 251 runs
Edgbaston, Birmingham
Points: Australia 24, England 0

14–18 August 2019
Scorecard

England; 258 (77.1 overs) & 258/5d (71 overs)	v	Australia; 250 (94.3 overs) & 154/6 (47.3 overs)

Match drawn
Lord's, London
Points: England 8, Australia 8

22–26 August 2019
Scorecard

Australia; 179 (52.1 overs) & 246 (75.2 overs)	v	England; 67 (27.5 overs) & 362/9 (125.4 overs)

England won by 1 wicket
Headingley, Leeds
Points: England 24, Australia 0

4–8 September 2019
Scorecard

Australia; 497/8d (126 overs) & 186/6d (42.5 overs)	v	England; 301 (107 overs) & 197 (91.3 overs)

Australia won by 185 runs
Old Trafford, Manchester
Points: Australia 24, England 0

12–16 September 2019
Scorecard

England; 294 (87.1 overs) & 329 (95.3 overs)	v	Australia; 225 (68.5 overs) & 263 (76.6 overs)

England won by 135 runs
The Kia Oval, London
Points: England 24, Australia 0

==== Sri Lanka v New Zealand ====
14–18 August 2019
Scorecard

New Zealand; 249 (83.2 overs) & 285 (106 overs)	v	Sri Lanka; 267 (93.2 overs) & 268/4 (86.1 overs)

Sri Lanka won by 6 wickets
Galle International Stadium, Galle
Points: Sri Lanka 60, New Zealand 0

22–26 August 2019
Scorecard

Sri Lanka; 244 (90.2 overs) & 122 (70.2 overs)	v	New Zealand; 431/6d (115 overs)

New Zealand won by an innings and 65 runs
P. Sara Oval, Colombo
Points: New Zealand 60, Sri Lanka 0

==== West Indies v India ====
22–26 August 2019
Scorecard

India; 297 (96.4 overs) & 343/7d (112.3 overs)	v	West Indies; 222 (74.2 overs) & 100 (26.5 overs)

India won by 318 runs
Sir Vivian Richards Stadium, North Sound
Points: India 60, West Indies 0

30 August–3 September 2019
Scorecard

India; 416 (140.1 overs) & 168/4d (54.4 overs)	v	West Indies; 117 (47.1 overs) & 210 (59.5 overs)

India won by 257 runs
Sabina Park, Kingston
Points: India 60, West Indies 0

=== 2019–20 ===
==== Freedom Trophy (India v South Africa) ====
2–6 October 2019
Scorecard

India; 502/7d (136 overs) & 323/4d (67 overs)	v	South Africa; 431 (131.2 overs) & 191 (63.5 overs)

India won by 203 runs
Dr. Y. S. Rajasekhara Reddy ACA–VDCA Cricket Stadium, Visakhapatnam
Points: India 40, South Africa 0

10–14 October 2019
Scorecard

India; 601/5d (156.3 overs)	v	South Africa; 275 (105.4 overs) & 189 (67.2 overs) (f/o)

India won by an innings and 137 runs
Maharashtra Cricket Association Stadium, Pune
Points: India 40, South Africa 0

19–23 October 2019
Scorecard

India; 497/9d (116.3 overs)	v	South Africa; 162 (56.2 overs) & 133 (48 overs) (f/o)

India won by an innings and 202 runs
JSCA International Stadium Complex, Ranchi
Points: India 40, South Africa 0

==== India v Bangladesh ====
14–18 November 2019
Scorecard

Bangladesh; 150 (58.3 overs) & 213 (69.2 overs)	v	India; 493/6d (114 overs)

India won by an innings and 130 runs
Holkar Stadium, Indore
Points: India 60, Bangladesh 0

22–26 November 2019 (D/N)
Scorecard

Bangladesh; 106 (30.3 overs) & 195 (41.1 overs)	v	India; 347/9d (89.4 overs)

India won by an innings and 46 runs
Eden Gardens, Kolkata
Points: India 60, Bangladesh 0

==== Australia v Pakistan ====
21–25 November 2019
Scorecard

Pakistan; 240 (86.2 overs) & 335 (84.2 overs)	v	Australia; 580 (157.4 overs)

Australia won by an innings and 5 runs
The Gabba, Brisbane
Points: Australia 60, Pakistan 0

29 November – 3 December 2019 (D/N)
Scorecard

Australia; 589/3d (127 overs)	v	Pakistan; 302 (94.4 overs) & 239 (82 overs) (f/o)

Australia won by an innings and 48 runs
Adelaide Oval, Adelaide
Points: Australia 60, Pakistan 0

==== Pakistan v Sri Lanka ====
11–15 December 2019
Scorecard

Sri Lanka; 308/6d (97 overs)	v	Pakistan; 252/2 (70 overs)

Match drawn
Rawalpindi Cricket Stadium, Rawalpindi
Points: Pakistan 20, Sri Lanka 20

19–23 December 2019
Scorecard

Pakistan; 191 (59.3 overs) & 555/3d (131 overs)	v	Sri Lanka; 271 (85.5 overs) & 212 (62.5 overs)

Pakistan won by 263 runs
National Stadium, Karachi
Points: Pakistan 60, Sri Lanka 0

==== Trans-Tasman Trophy (Australia v New Zealand) ====
12–16 December 2019 (D/N)
Scorecard

Australia; 416 (146.2 overs) & 9/217d (69.1 overs)	v	New Zealand; 166 (55.2 overs) & 171 (65.3 overs)

Australia won by 296 runs
Perth Stadium, Perth
Points: Australia 40, New Zealand 0

26–30 December 2019
Scorecard

Australia; 467 (155.1 overs) & 5/168d (54.2 overs)	v	New Zealand; 148 (54.5 overs) & 240 (71 overs)

Australia won by 247 runs
Melbourne Cricket Ground, Melbourne
Points: Australia 40, New Zealand 0

3–7 January 2020
Scorecard

Australia; 454 (150.1 overs) & 2/217d (52 overs)	v	New Zealand; 256 (95.4 overs) & 136 (47.5 overs)

Australia won by 279 runs
Sydney Cricket Ground, Sydney
Points: Australia 40, New Zealand 0

==== Basil D'Oliveira Trophy (South Africa v England) ====
26–30 December 2019
Scorecard

South Africa; 284 (84.3 overs) & 272 (61.4 overs)	v	England; 181 (53.2 overs) & 268 (93 overs)

South Africa won by 107 runs
Centurion Park, Centurion
Points: South Africa 30, England 0

3–7 January 2020
Scorecard

England; 269 (91.5 overs) & 391/8d (111 overs)	v	South Africa; 223 (89 overs) & 248 (137.4 overs)

England won by 189 runs
PPC Newlands, Cape Town
Points: England 30, South Africa 0

16–20 January 2020
Scorecard

England; 499/9d (152 overs)	v	South Africa; 209 (86.4 overs) & 237 (88.5 overs)(f/o)

England won by an innings and 53 runs
St George's Park Cricket Ground, Port Elizabeth
Points: England 30, South Africa 0

24–28 January 2020
Scorecard

England; 400 (98.2 overs) & 248 (61.3 overs)	v	South Africa; 183 (68.3 overs) & 274 (77.1 overs)

England won by 191 runs
Wanderers Stadium, Johannesburg
Points: England 30, South Africa −6

==== Pakistan v Bangladesh ====
The second match was postponed due to the COVID-19 pandemic. Due to a busy schedule, the match would be postponed until the 2021–22 season and outside the Championship season.

7–11 February 2020
Scorecard

Bangladesh; 233 (82.5 overs) & 168 (62.2 overs)	v	Pakistan; 445 (122.5 overs)

Pakistan won by an innings and 44 runs
Rawalpindi Cricket Stadium, Rawalpindi
Points: Pakistan 60, Bangladesh 0

5–9 April 2020
Scorecard

Pakistan	v	Bangladesh

Cancelled
National Stadium, Karachi

==== New Zealand v India ====
21–25 February 2020
Scorecard

India; 165 (68.1 overs) & 191 (81 overs)	v	New Zealand; 348 (100.2 overs) & 9/0 (1.4 overs)

New Zealand won by 10 wickets
Basin Reserve, Wellington
Points: New Zealand 60, India 0

29 February–4 March 2020
Scorecard

India; 242 (63 overs) & 124 (46 overs)	v	New Zealand; 235 (73.1 overs) & 132/3 (36 overs)

New Zealand won by 7 wickets
Hagley Oval, Christchurch
Points: New Zealand 60, India 0

=== 2020 ===
==== Bangladesh v Australia ====
This series did not happen due to the COVID-19 pandemic.

11–15 June 2020
Scorecard

Bangladesh	v	Australia

Cancelled
Zohur Ahmed Chowdhury Stadium, Chattogram

19–23 June 2020
Scorecard

Bangladesh	v	Australia

Cancelled
Sher-e-Bangla National Cricket Stadium, Dhaka

==== Wisden Trophy (England v West Indies) ====
This series was originally scheduled for June 2020 but was postponed due to the COVID-19 pandemic.

8–12 July 2020
Scorecard

England; 204 (67.3 overs) & 313 (111.2 overs)	v	West Indies; 318 (102 overs) & 200/6 (64.2 overs)

West Indies won by 4 wickets
Rose Bowl, Southampton
Points: West Indies 40, England 0

16–20 July 2020
Scorecard

England; 469/9d (162 overs) & 129/3d (19 overs)	v	West Indies; 287 (99 overs) & 198 (70.1 overs)

England won by 113 runs
Old Trafford, Manchester
Points: England 40, West Indies 0

24–28 July 2020
Scorecard

England; 369 (111.5 overs) & 226/2d (58 overs)	v	West Indies; 197 (65 overs) & 129 (37.1 overs)

England won by 269 runs
Old Trafford, Manchester
Points: England 40, West Indies 0

==== England v Pakistan ====
5–9 August 2020
Scorecard

Pakistan; 326 (109.3 overs) & 169 (46.4 overs)	v	England; 219 (70.3 overs) & 277/7 (82.1 overs)

England won by 3 wickets
Old Trafford, Manchester
Points: England 40, Pakistan 0

13–17 August 2020
Scorecard

Pakistan; 236 (91.2 overs)	v	England; 110/4d (43.1 overs)

Match drawn
Rose Bowl, Southampton
Points: England 13, Pakistan 13

21–25 August 2020

England; 583/8d (154.4 overs)	v	Pakistan; 273 (93 overs) & 187/4 (83.1 overs) (f/o)

Match drawn
Rose Bowl, Southampton
Points: Pakistan 13, England 13

==== Bangladesh v New Zealand ====
This series did not happen due to the COVID-19 pandemic.

August 2020

Bangladesh	v	New Zealand

Cancelled

August 2020

Bangladesh	v	New Zealand

Cancelled

=== 2020–21 ===
==== New Zealand v West Indies ====
3–7 December 2020
Scorecard

New Zealand; 519/7d (145 overs)	v	West Indies; 138 (64 overs) & 247 (58.5 overs) (f/o)

New Zealand won by an innings and 134 runs
Seddon Park, Hamilton
Points: New Zealand 60, West Indies 0

11–15 December 2020
Scorecard

New Zealand; 460 (114 overs)	v	West Indies; 131 (56.4 overs) & 317 (79.1 overs) (f/o)

New Zealand won by an innings and 12 runs
Basin Reserve, Wellington
Points: New Zealand 60, West Indies 0

==== Border–Gavaskar Trophy (Australia v India) ====
17–21 December 2020 (D/N)
Scorecard

India; 244 (93.1 overs) & 36 (21.2 overs)	v	Australia; 191 (72.1 overs) & 2/93 (21 overs)

Australia won by 8 wickets
Adelaide Oval, Adelaide
Points: Australia 30, India 0

26–30 December 2020
Scorecard

Australia; 195 (72.3 overs) & 200 (103.1 overs)	v	India; 326 (115.1 overs) & 2/70 (15.5 overs)

India won by 8 wickets
Melbourne Cricket Ground, Melbourne
Points: India 30, Australia −4

7–11 January 2021
Scorecard

Australia; 338 (105.4 overs) & 6/312d (87 overs)	v	India; 244 (100.4 overs) & 334/5 (131 overs)

Match drawn
Sydney Cricket Ground, Sydney
Points: Australia 10, India 10

15–19 January 2021
Scorecard

Australia; 369 (115.2 overs) & 294 (75.5 overs)	v	India; 336 (111.4 overs) & 7/329 (97 overs)

India won by 3 wickets
The Gabba, Brisbane
Points: India 30, Australia 0

==== New Zealand v Pakistan ====
26–30 December 2020
Scorecard

New Zealand; 431 (155 overs) & 180/5d (45.3 overs)	v	Pakistan; 239 (102.2 overs) & 271 (123.3 overs)

New Zealand won by 101 runs
Bay Oval, Mount Maunganui
Points: New Zealand 60, Pakistan 0

3–7 January 2021
Scorecard

Pakistan; 297 (83.5 overs) & 186 (81.4 overs)	v	New Zealand; 659/6d (158.5 overs)

New Zealand won by an innings and 176 runs
Hagley Oval, Christchurch
Points: New Zealand 60, Pakistan 0

==== South Africa v Sri Lanka ====
26–30 December 2020
Scorecard

Sri Lanka; 396 (96 overs) & 180 (46.1 overs)	v	South Africa; 621 (142.1 overs)

South Africa won by an innings and 45 runs
Centurion Park, Centurion
Points: South Africa 60, Sri Lanka 0

3–7 January 2021
Scorecard

Sri Lanka; 157 (40.3 overs) & 211 (56.5 overs)	v	South Africa; 302 (75.4 overs) & 67/0 (13.2 overs)

South Africa won by 10 wickets
Wanderers Stadium, Johannesburg
Points: South Africa 60, Sri Lanka 0

==== Sri Lanka v England ====
This series was originally scheduled for March 2020 but was postponed due to the COVID-19 pandemic.

14–18 January 2021
Scorecard

Sri Lanka; 135 (46.1 overs) & 359 (136.5 overs)	v	England; 421 (117.1 overs) & 76/3 (24.2 overs)

England won by 7 wickets
Galle International Stadium, Galle
Points: England 60, Sri Lanka 0

22–26 January 2021
Scorecard

Sri Lanka; 381 (139.3 overs) & 126 (35.5 overs)	v	England; 344 (116.1 overs) & 164/4 (43.3 overs)

England won by 6 wickets
Galle International Stadium, Galle
Points: England 60, Sri Lanka 0

==== Pakistan v South Africa ====
26–30 January 2021
Scorecard

South Africa; 220 (69.2 overs) & 245 (100.3 overs)	v	Pakistan; 378 (119.2 overs) & 90/3 (22.5 overs)

Pakistan won by 7 wickets
National Stadium, Karachi
Points: Pakistan 60, South Africa 0

4–8 February 2021
Scorecard

Pakistan; 272 (114.3 overs) & 298 (102 overs)	v	South Africa; 201 (65.4 overs) & 274 (91.4 overs)

Pakistan won by 95 runs
Rawalpindi Cricket Stadium, Rawalpindi
Points: Pakistan 60, South Africa 0

==== Bangladesh v West Indies ====
This was originally a three-match series scheduled for January 2021.

3–7 February 2021
Scorecard

Bangladesh; 430 (150.2 overs) & 223/8d (67.5 overs)	v	West Indies; 259 (96.1 overs) & 395/7 (127.3 overs)

West Indies won by 3 wickets
Zohur Ahmed Chowdhury Stadium, Chattogram
Points: West Indies 60, Bangladesh 0

11–15 February 2021
Scorecard

West Indies; 409 (142.2 overs) & 117 (52.5 overs)	v	Bangladesh; 296 (96.5 overs) & 213 (61.3 overs)

West Indies won by 17 runs
Sher-e-Bangla National Cricket Stadium, Dhaka
Points: West Indies 60, Bangladesh 0

==== Anthony de Mello Trophy (India v England) ====
This was originally a five-match series.

5–9 February 2021
Scorecard

England; 578 (190.1 overs) & 178 (46.3 overs)	v	India; 337 (95.5 overs) & 192 (58.1 overs)

England won by 227 runs
M. A. Chidambaram Stadium, Chennai
Points: England 30, India 0

13–17 February 2021
Scorecard

India; 329 (95.5 overs) & 286 (85.5 overs)	v	England; 134 (59.5 overs) & 164 (54.2 overs)

India won by 317 runs
M. A. Chidambaram Stadium, Chennai
Points: India 30, England 0

24–28 February 2021 (D/N)
Scorecard

England; 112 (48.4 overs) & 81 (30.4 overs)	v	India; 145 (53.2 overs) & 49/0 (7.4 overs)

India won by 10 wickets
Narendra Modi Stadium, Ahmedabad
Points: India 30, England 0

4–8 March 2021
Scorecard

England; 205 (75.5 overs) & 135 (54.5 overs)	v	India; 365 (114.4 overs)

India won by an innings and 25 runs
Narendra Modi Stadium, Ahmedabad
Points: India 30, England 0

==== South Africa v Australia ====
This series did not take place as originally scheduled due to the COVID-19 pandemic and could not be a part of the Championship season.

March 2021

South Africa	v	Australia

Cancelled

March 2021

South Africa	v	Australia

Cancelled

March 2021

South Africa	v	Australia

Cancelled

==== Sobers–Tissera Trophy (West Indies v Sri Lanka) ====
21–25 March 2021
Scorecard

Sri Lanka; 169 (69.4 overs) & 476 (149.5 overs)	v	West Indies; 271 (103 overs) & 236/4 (100 overs)

Match drawn
Sir Vivian Richards Stadium, North Sound
Points: West Indies 20, Sri Lanka 20

29 March – 2 April 2021
Scorecard

West Indies; 354 (111.1 overs) & 280/4d (72.4 overs)	v	Sri Lanka; 258 (107 overs) & 193/2 (79 overs)

Match drawn
Sir Vivian Richards Stadium, North Sound
Points: West Indies 20, Sri Lanka 20

==== Sri Lanka v Bangladesh ====
This series originally comprised three Test matches and was scheduled for July–August 2020, then postponed to October 2020, but was rescheduled again due to the COVID-19 pandemic.

21–25 April 2021
Scorecard

Bangladesh; 541/7d (173 overs) & 100/2 (33 overs)	v	Sri Lanka; 648/8d (179 overs)

Match drawn
Pallekele International Cricket Stadium, Kandy
Points: Sri Lanka 20, Bangladesh 20

29 April–3 May 2021
Scorecard

Sri Lanka; 493/7d (159.2 overs) & 194/9d (42.2 overs)	v	Bangladesh; 251 (83 overs) & 227 (71 overs)

Sri Lanka won by 209 runs
Pallekele International Cricket Stadium, Kandy
Points: Sri Lanka 60, Bangladesh 0

=== 2021 ===
==== Sir Vivian Richards Trophy (West Indies v South Africa) ====
This series was scheduled to be played in July 2020 but was postponed due to the COVID-19 pandemic.

10–14 June 2021
Scorecard

West Indies; 97 (40.5 Overs) & 162 (64 Overs)	v	South Africa; 322 (96.5 Overs)

South Africa won by an innings and 63 runs
Daren Sammy Cricket Ground, Gros Islet
Points: South Africa 60, West Indies 0

18–22 June 2021
Scorecard

South Africa; 298 (112.4 overs) & 174 (53 overs)	v	West Indies; 149 (54 overs) & 165 (58.3 overs)

South Africa won by 158 runs
Daren Sammy Cricket Ground, Gros Islet
Points: South Africa 60, West Indies −6

== Final ==
18–23 June 2021 (Note: The final was initially scheduled for five days from 18–22 June, but weather delays meant that the scheduled reserve day was used.)
Scorecard

India; 217 (92.1 overs) & 170 (73 overs)	v	New Zealand; 249 (99.2 overs) & 140/2 (45.5 overs)

New Zealand won by 8 wickets
Rose Bowl, Southampton

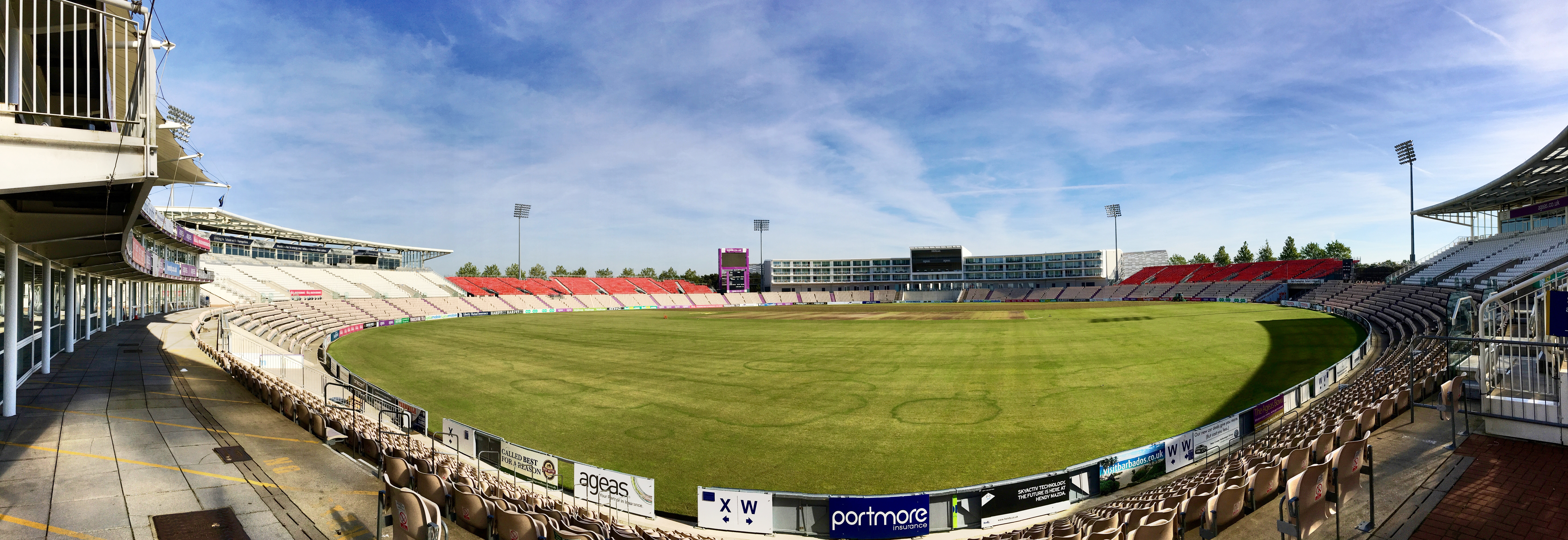
Panorama of the Rose Bowl, the venue for the final match

== Final standings ==
Pos.	Team	Prize money (US$)
1	New Zealand	$1,600,000
2	India	$800,000
3	Australia	$450,000
4	England	$350,000
5	South Africa	$200,000
6	Pakistan	$100,000
7	Sri Lanka	$100,000
8	West Indies	$100,000
9	Bangladesh	$100,000

== Statistics ==
=== Individual statistics ===
The top 5 players in each category are listed.

==== Most runs ====
Runs	Batsman	Mat	Inns	NO	Ave	HS	100s	50s
1,675	(Australia) Marnus Labuschagne	13	23	0	72.82	215	5	9
1,660	(England) Joe Root	20	37	2	47.43	228	3	8
1,341	(Australia) Steve Smith	13	22	1	63.85	211	4	7
1,334	(England) Ben Stokes	17	32	3	46.00	176	4	6
1,159	(India) Virat Kohli	18	30	3	42.92	115	3	6
Last updated: 23 June 2021

==== Most wickets ====
Wkts	Bowler	Mat	Inns	Runs	Overs	BBI	BBM	Avg	5WI	10WM
71	(India) Ravichandran Ashwin	14	26	1,444	549.4	7/145	9/207	20.33	4	0
70	(Australia) Pat Cummins	14	28	1,472	555.3	5/28	7/69	21.02	1	0
69	(England) Stuart Broad	17	32	1,386	499.3	6/31	10/67	20.08	2	1
56	(New Zealand) Tim Southee	11	22	1,166	431.3	5/32	9/110	20.82	3	0
56	(Australia) Nathan Lyon	14	27	1,757	630.5	6/49	10/118	31.37	4	1
Last updated: 23 June 2021

==== Most dismissals for a wicket-keeper ====
Dismissals	Player	Mat	Inns	Catches	Stumping	BBI	Dis/Inn
65	(Australia) Tim Paine	14	28	63	2	5	2.321
50	(South Africa) Quinton de Kock	13	22	48	2	6	2.272
50	(England) Jos Buttler	18	25	49	1	4	2.000
48	(New Zealand) BJ Watling	11	22	47	1	5	2.181
41	(India) Rishabh Pant	12	24	35	6	4	1.708
Last updated: 11 June 2023

==== Most catches for a player ====
Dismissals	Player	Mat	Inns	Catches	Dis/Inn
34	(England) Joe Root	20	38	3	0.894
27	(Australia) Steve Smith	13	26	4	1.038
25	(England) Ben Stokes	17	33	5	0.757
23	(India) Ajinkya Rahane	18	36	3	0.638
21	(New Zealand) Ross Taylor	12	24	3	0.875
Last updated: 11 June 2023

==== Highest individual score ====
Runs	Batsman	Balls	4s	6s	Opposition	Venue	Match date
335*	(Australia) David Warner	418	39	1	Pakistan	Adelaide Oval, Adelaide	29 November 2019
267	(England) Zak Crawley	393	34	1	Pakistan	The Rose Bowl, Southampton	21 August 2020
254*	(India) Virat Kohli	336	33	2	South Africa	Maharashtra Cricket Association Stadium, Pune	10 October 2019
251	(New Zealand) Kane Williamson	412	34	2	(Cricket West Indies) West Indies	Seddon Park, Hamilton	3 December 2020
244	(Sri Lanka) Dimuth Karunaratne	437	26	0	Bangladesh	Pallekele International Cricket Stadium, Pallekele	21 April 2021
Last updated: 23 June 2021

==== Best bowling figures in an innings ====
Figure	Bowler	Overs	Mdns	Econ	Opposition	Venue	Match date
7/137	(Sri Lanka) Lasith Embuldeniya	42.0	6	3.26	England	Galle International Stadium, Galle	22 January 2021
7/145	(India) Ravichandran Ashwin	46.2	11	3.12	South Africa	ACA–VDCA Cricket Stadium, Visakhapatnam	2 October 2019
6/27	(India) Jasprit Bumrah	12.1	3	2.21	(Cricket West Indies) West Indies	Sabina Park, Kingston	30 August 2019
6/31	(England) Stuart Broad	14.0	4	2.21	(Cricket West Indies) West Indies	Old Trafford, Manchester	24 July 2020
6/38	(India) Axar Patel	21.4	6	1.75	England	Narendra Modi Stadium, Ahmedabad	24 February 2021
Last updated: 23 June 2021

==== Best bowling figures in a match ====
Figure	Bowler	Overs	Mdns	Opposition	Venue	Match date
11/70	(India) Axar Patel	36.4	9	England	Narendra Modi Stadium, Ahmedabad	25 February 2021
11/117	(New Zealand) Kyle Jamieson	41	14	Pakistan	Hagley Oval, Christchurch	3 January 2021
11/178	(Sri Lanka) Praveen Jayawickrama	64	17	Bangladesh	Pallekele International Cricket Stadium, Kandy	29 April 2021
10/67	(England) Stuart Broad	22.1	5	(Cricket West Indies) West Indies	Old Trafford, Manchester	24 July 2020
10/114	(Pakistan) Hasan Ali	31.4	4	South Africa	Rawalpindi Cricket Stadium, Rawalpindi	4 February 2021
Last updated: 23 June 2021

==== Best batting averages ====
Average	Batsman	Matches	Innings	Runs	HS	100s	50s
72.82	(Australia) Marnus Labuschagne	13	23	1,675	215	5	9
66.57	(Pakistan) Babar Azam	10	17	932	143	4	5
63.85	(Australia) Steve Smith	13	22	1,341	211	4	6
61.20	(New Zealand) Kane Williamson	10	16	918	251	3	2
60.77	(India) Rohit Sharma	12	19	1,094	212	4	2
Qualification: Minimum 10 innings Last updated: 23 June 2021

==== Best bowling averages ====
Average	Bowler	Matches	Wkts	Runs	Balls	BBI	BBM
10.59	(India) Axar Patel	3	27	286	766	6/38	11/70
12.53	(New Zealand) Kyle Jamieson	7	43	539	1,478	6/48	11/117
17.79	(India) Ishant Sharma	12	39	694	1,496	5/22	9/78
18.55	(India) Umesh Yadav	7	27	538	962	5/53	8/82
19.51	(England) James Anderson	12	39	761	1,991	6/40	7/63
Qualification: Minimum 500 deliveries bowled Last updated: 23 June 2021

=== Team statistics ===
==== Highest team totals ====
Score	Team	Overs	RR	Inns	Opposition	Venue	Date
659/6d	New Zealand	158.5	4.14	2	Pakistan	Hagley Oval, Christchurch	3 January 2021
648/8d	Sri Lanka	179	3.62	2	Bangladesh	Pallekele International Cricket Stadium, Pallekele	21 April 2021
621	South Africa	142.1	4.36	2	Sri Lanka	SuperSport Park, Centurion	26 December 2020
601/5d	India	156.3	3.84	1	South Africa	Maharashtra Cricket Association Stadium, Pune	10 October 2019
589/3d	Australia	127.0	4.63	1	Pakistan	Adelaide Oval, Adelaide	29 November 2019
(d=declared); Last updated: 23 June 2021

==== Lowest team totals ====
Score	Team	Overs	RR	Inns	Opposition	Venue	Date
36	India	21.2	1.68	3	Australia	Adelaide Oval, Adelaide	19 December 2020
67	England	27.5	2.40	2	Australia	Headingley Cricket Ground, Headingley	22 August 2019
81	England	30.4	2.64	3	India	Narendra Modi Stadium, Ahmedabad	25 February 2021
97	West Indies	40.5	2.37	1	South Africa	Daren Sammy Cricket Ground, Gros Islet	10 June 2021
100	West Indies	26.5	3.72	4	India	Sir Vivian Richards Stadium, North Sound	22 August 2019
Last updated: 23 June 2021

==== Highest successful run-chases ====
Score	Team	Target	Overs	RR	Opposition	Venue	Date
395/7	West Indies	395	127.3	3.10	Bangladesh	Zohur Ahmed Chowdhury Stadium, Chattogram	7 February 2021
362/9	England	359	125.4	2.88	Australia	Headingley Cricket Ground, Headingley	25 August 2019
329/7	India	328	97.0	3.39	Australia	The Gabba, Brisbane	19 January 2021
277/7	England	277	82.1	3.37	Pakistan	Old Trafford, Manchester	8 August 2020
268/4	Sri Lanka	268	86.1	3.11	New Zealand	Galle International Stadium, Galle	18 August 2019
Last updated: 23 June 2021

== See also ==
- ICC Test Championship Mace
- Test cricket
- ICC Test Championship
- ICC Men's Test Team Rankings
- 2020–23 ICC Cricket World Cup Super League
- 2021–2023 ICC World Test Championship
