= New Zealand cricket team in Sri Lanka in 2019 =

International cricket tour

	Sri Lanka	New Zealand
- Dates: 8 August – 6 September 2019
Captains	Dimuth Karunaratne (Tests); Lasith Malinga (T20Is)	Kane Williamson (Tests); Tim Southee (T20Is)

Test series
- Result: 2-match series drawn 1–1
Most runs	Dimuth Karunaratne (247)	Tom Latham (229)
Most wickets	Akila Dananjaya (6); Lasith Embuldeniya (6)	Ajaz Patel (9)
- Player of the series: BJ Watling (NZ)

Twenty20 International series
- Results: New Zealand won the 3-match series 2–1
Most runs	Kusal Mendis (105)	Colin de Grandhomme (103)
Most wickets	Lasith Malinga (7)	Tim Southee (4); Mitchell Santner (4)
- Player of the series: Tim Southee (NZ)

The New Zealand cricket team toured Sri Lanka in August and September 2019 to play two Test and three Twenty20 International (T20I) matches. The Test series formed a part of the inaugural 2019–2021 ICC World Test Championship. The fixtures for the tour were confirmed in July 2019. Originally, the first two T20I matches were scheduled to be played at the R. Premadasa International Cricket Stadium in Colombo, but were moved to the Pallekele International Cricket Stadium in Kandy.

Sri Lanka Cricket named a twenty-two man squad for the Test series, which was trimmed down to the final fifteen cricketers. The Test series was drawn 1–1, with Sri Lanka winning the first match and New Zealand winning the second.

In the third and final T20I match, Sri Lanka's Lasith Malinga became the first bowler to take 100 wickets in Twenty20 International cricket. Malinga took a hat-trick, and four wickets with four balls, in the third over of his spell. He was the first bowler to take four wickets in four consecutive balls twice in international cricket, after previously doing so against South Africa in the 2007 Cricket World Cup. He also became the first bowler to take five hat-tricks across all formats of international cricket. Sri Lanka won the match, though New Zealand won the T20I series 2–1.

== Squads ==
Tests		T20Is	
Sri Lanka	New Zealand	Sri Lanka	New Zealand
Dimuth Karunaratne (c); Dinesh Chandimal; Dhananjaya de Silva; Akila Dananjaya; Niroshan Dickwella (wk); Lasith Embuldeniya; Oshada Fernando; Vishwa Fernando; Lahiru Kumara; Suranga Lakmal; Angelo Mathews; Kusal Mendis; Dilruwan Perera; Kusal Perera; Lakshan Sandakan; Lahiru Thirimanne	Kane Williamson (c); Todd Astle; Tom Blundell; Trent Boult; Colin de Grandhomme; Tom Latham; Henry Nicholls; Ajaz Patel; Jeet Raval; Mitchell Santner; William Somerville; Tim Southee; Ross Taylor; Neil Wagner; BJ Watling (wk)	Lasith Malinga (c); Niroshan Dickwella (vc, wk); Akila Dananjaya; Avishka Fernando; Danushka Gunathilaka; Wanindu Hasaranga; Shehan Jayasuriya; Lahiru Kumara; Lahiru Madushanka; Kusal Mendis; Kusal Perera; Kasun Rajitha; Lakshan Sandakan; Dasun Shanaka; Isuru Udana	Tim Southee (c); Todd Astle; Tom Bruce; Colin de Grandhomme; ~~Lockie Ferguson~~; Martin Guptill; Scott Kuggeleijn; Daryl Mitchell; Colin Munro; Seth Rance; Hamish Rutherford; Mitchell Santner; Tim Seifert (wk); Ish Sodhi; Ross Taylor

Dilruwan Perera was added to Sri Lanka's squad for the second Test. Lockie Ferguson was ruled out of New Zealand's T20I squad with a fractured thumb. Hamish Rutherford was added to New Zealand's T20I squad for the third match, after Martin Guptill was ruled out of the final fixture due to injury.

== Tour matches ==
=== Three-day match: Sri Lanka Board Presidents XI vs New Zealand ===
8–10 August 2019
Scorecard

Sri Lanka Board Presidents XI	v	New Zealand
323/6 (65.5 overs); Danushka Gunathilaka 98 (97); Ajaz Patel 5/41 (10 overs)

Match drawn
FTZ Sports Complex, Katunayake
Umpires: Deepal Gunawardene (SL) and Rohitha Kottahachchi (SL)

- Sri Lanka Board Presidents XI won the toss and elected to bat.
- No play was possible on days 2 and 3 due to rain.

=== Twenty-over match: Sri Lanka Board Presidents XI vs New Zealand ===
29 August 2019
10:00
Scorecard

New Zealand; 168/6 (20 overs)	v	Sri Lanka Board Presidents XI; 135/9 (20 overs)
Ross Taylor 53* (34); Wanindu Hasaranga 2/35 (4 overs)		Shehan Jayasuriya 26 (25); Scott Kuggeleijn 4/19 (4 overs)

New Zealand won by 33 runs
FTZ Sports Complex, Katunayake
Umpires: Nilan de Silva (SL) and Gamini Dissanayake (SL)

- New Zealand won the toss and elected to bat.

== Test series ==
=== 1st Test ===
14–18 August 2019
Scorecard

New Zealand	v	Sri Lanka
249 (83.2 overs); Ross Taylor 86 (132); Akila Dananjaya 5/80 (30 overs)		267 (93.2 overs); Niroshan Dickwella 61 (109); Ajaz Patel 5/89 (33 overs)
285 (106 overs); BJ Watling 77 (173); Lasith Embuldeniya 4/99 (37 overs)		268/4 (86.1 overs); Dimuth Karunaratne 122 (243); Tim Southee 1/33 (12 overs)

Sri Lanka won by 6 wickets
Galle International Stadium, Galle
Umpires: Michael Gough (Eng) and Richard Illingworth (Eng)
Player of the match: Dimuth Karunaratne (SL)

- New Zealand won the toss and elected to bat.
- 22 overs of play were lost on day 1 due to rain.
- World Test Championship points: Sri Lanka 60, New Zealand 0.

=== 2nd Test ===
22–26 August 2019
Scorecard

Sri Lanka	v	New Zealand
244 (90.2 overs); Dhananjaya de Silva 109 (148); Tim Southee 4/63 (29 overs)		431/6d (115 overs); Tom Latham 154 (251); Dilruwan Perera 3/114 (37 overs)
122 (70.2 overs); Niroshan Dickwella 51 (161); Tim Southee 2/15 (12 overs)

New Zealand won by an innings and 65 runs
P. Sara Oval, Colombo
Umpires: Michael Gough (Eng) and Bruce Oxenford (Aus)
Player of the match: Tom Latham (NZ)

- Sri Lanka won the toss and elected to bat.
- Only 66 overs of play were possible across days 1 and 2 due to rain. No play was possible before lunch on day 4 due to rain.
- Trent Boult became the third bowler for New Zealand to take 250 wickets in Tests.
- Tom Latham (NZ) scored his tenth century in Tests.
- Tim Southee became the fourth bowler for New Zealand to take 250 wickets in Tests.
- World Test Championship points: New Zealand 60, Sri Lanka 0.

== T20I series ==
=== 1st T20I ===
1 September 2019
19:00 (N)
Scorecard

Sri Lanka; 174/4 (20 overs)	v	New Zealand; 175/5 (19.3 overs)
Kusal Mendis 79 (53); Tim Southee 2/20 (4 overs)		Ross Taylor 48 (29); Wanindu Hasaranga 2/21 (4 overs)

New Zealand won by 5 wickets
Pallekele International Cricket Stadium, Kandy
Umpires: Prageeth Rambukwella (SL) and Raveendra Wimalasiri (SL)
Player of the match: Ross Taylor (NZ)

- Sri Lanka won the toss and elected to bat.
- Wanindu Hasaranga (SL) made his T20I debut.
- Lasith Malinga (SL) took his 99th wicket to become the leading wicket-taker in T20Is.

=== 2nd T20I ===
3 September 2019
19:00 (N)
Scorecard

Sri Lanka; 161/9 (20 overs)	v	New Zealand; 165/6 (19.4 overs)
Niroshan Dickwella 39 (30); Seth Rance 3/33 (4 overs)		Colin de Grandhomme 59 (46); Akila Dananjaya 3/36 (4 overs)

New Zealand won by 4 wickets
Pallekele International Cricket Stadium, Kandy
Umpires: Lyndon Hannibal (SL) and Raveendra Wimalasiri (SL)
Player of the match: Tim Southee (NZ)

- Sri Lanka won the toss and elected to bat.

=== 3rd T20I ===
6 September 2019
19:00 (N)
Scorecard

Sri Lanka; 125/8 (20 overs)	v	New Zealand; 88 (16 overs)
Danushka Gunathilaka 30 (25); Mitchell Santner 3/12 (4 overs)		Tim Southee 28* (23); Lasith Malinga 5/6 (4 overs)

Sri Lanka won by 37 runs
Pallekele International Cricket Stadium, Kandy
Umpires: Lyndon Hannibal (SL) and Prageeth Rambukwella (SL)
Player of the match: Lasith Malinga (SL)

- Sri Lanka won the toss and elected to bat.
- Lahiru Madushanka (SL) made his T20I debut.
- Lasith Malinga (SL) took his 100th wicket in T20Is, a hat-trick, and four wickets in four balls.
