= 2021 World Test Championship final =

Cricket match

2021 ICC World Test Championship final
- Event: 2019–2021 ICC World Test Championship
India	New Zealand
(India)	(New Zealand)
217	249
&	&
170	140/2
- New Zealand won by 8 wickets
- Date: 18–23 June 2021
- Venue: Rose Bowl, Southampton
- Player of the match: Kyle Jamieson (NZ)
- Umpires: Michael Gough (Eng); Richard Illingworth (Eng)

The final of the 2019–2021 ICC World Test Championship, the inaugural ICC World Test Championship, was played from 18 to 23 June 2021 at the Rose Bowl, Southampton, England, between India and New Zealand. It was initially scheduled for five days, but time lost during the game to rain interruptions meant that the planned reserve day was used. New Zealand won the match by eight wickets to be crowned as the winners of the inaugural ICC World Test Championship. New Zealand won the ICC Test Championship mace for the first time, and were also awarded the cash prize of US$1.6 million, while India won US$800,000.

It was New Zealand's second major ICC trophy win after emerging victorious at the 2000 ICC KnockOut Trophy, and Kane Williamson became the second New Zealand captain after Stephen Fleming to win an ICC event. Williamson called the win a "very special occasion and a fantastic feeling". India's captain, Virat Kohli, acknowledged that New Zealand were the better team, but also called for a best-of-three series to decide future World Test Championships. New Zealand's Kyle Jamieson was named as the man of the match, after taking seven wickets, including a five-wicket haul in the first innings.

== Background ==
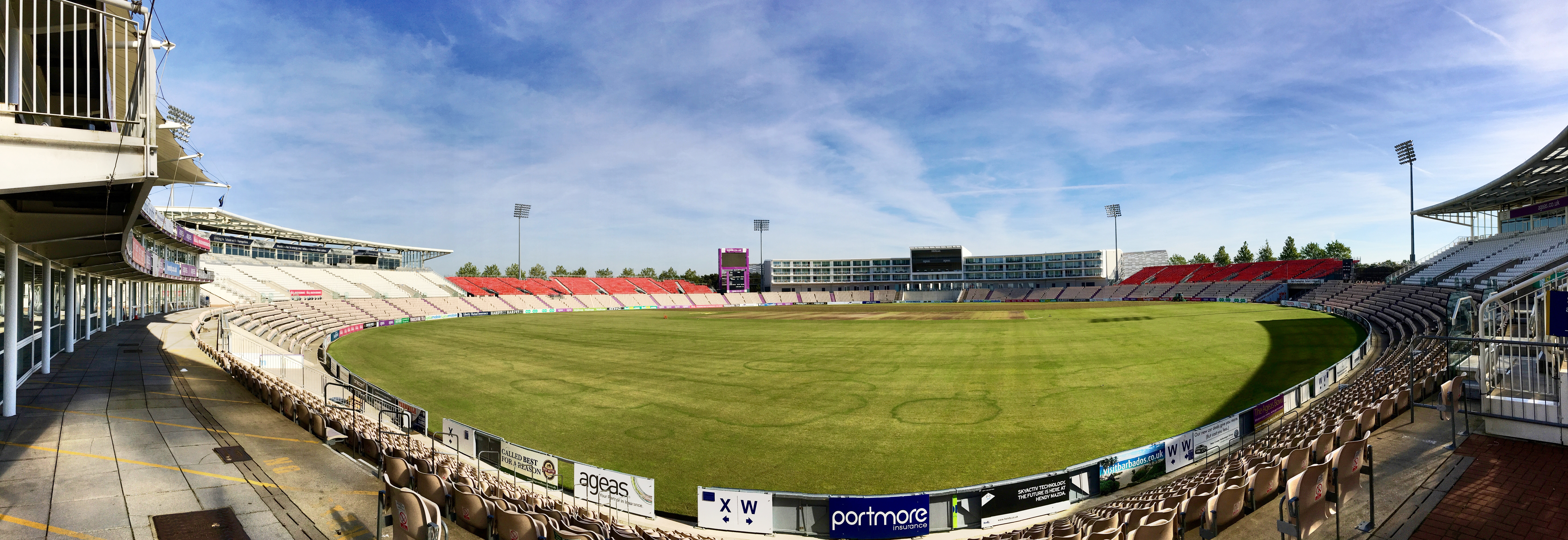
Panorama of the Rose Bowl, Southampton, the venue for the final match

India and New Zealand qualified for the final as the top two teams in the league stage of the 2019–2021 ICC World Test Championship. Due to the COVID-19 pandemic and multiple series being postponed, the league standings were determined by percentage of points earned. On 2 February 2021, Australia postponed their away series against South Africa, resulting in a guaranteed berth in the final for New Zealand. On 6 March 2021, India also confirmed their berth for the final, after beating England by 3–1 in a home Test series.

The final was initially due to be held at Lord's, but on 10 March 2021 the International Cricket Council (ICC) confirmed that the game had been moved to the Rose Bowl as the ground's on-site hotels made the venue suitable to establish a bubble environment, made necessary by the ongoing COVID-19 pandemic. England had used the ground for some of their international fixtures in 2020. Prior to the final, the Indian team played a four-day intra-squad practice match between Captain Virat Kohli XI and Captain KL Rahul XI at the Rose Bowl. Indian cricketers had not played in any matches since the suspension of the 2021 Indian Premier League on 4 May 2021. In contrast, the New Zealand team had played a two match Test series against England in the first two weeks of June.

If the match was either a draw or ended in a tie, both teams would have been declared as joint winners, sharing the trophy. On 14 June 2021, the ICC confirmed the prize money for the final: the winning team would receive US$1.6 million along with ICC Test Championship Mace, the losing team US$800,000, and the two teams would share US$2.4 million in the event of a draw.

== Road to the final ==
=== Route to the final ===
India		Round	New Zealand
Opponent	Result	League stage	Opponent	Result
West Indies (A)	India 2 – 0 West Indies	Series 1	Sri Lanka (A)	New Zealand 1 – 1 Sri Lanka
South Africa (H)	India 3 – 0 South Africa	Series 2	Australia (A)	New Zealand 0 – 3 Australia
Bangladesh (H)	India 2 – 0 Bangladesh	Series 3	India (H)	New Zealand 2 – 0 India
New Zealand (A)	India 0 – 2 New Zealand	Series 4	West Indies (H)	New Zealand 2 – 0 West Indies
Australia (A)	India 2 – 1 Australia	Series 5	Pakistan (H)	New Zealand 2 – 0 Pakistan
England (H)	India 3 – 1 England	Series 6
League stage 1st Place: Pos / Team / P / W / L / D / PC / Pts / PCT; 1 / India / 6 / 5 / 1 / 0 / 720 / 520 / 72.20; In reference to number of series played		Final League standings	League stage 2nd Place: Pos / Team / P / W / L / D / PC / Pts / PCT; 2 / New Zealand / 5 / 3 / 1 / 1 / 600 / 420 / 70.00; In reference to number of series played
2021 ICC World Test Championship Final

== Squads ==
India	New Zealand
Virat Kohli (c); Ajinkya Rahane (vc); Ravichandran Ashwin; Jasprit Bumrah; Shubman Gill; Ravindra Jadeja; Rishabh Pant (wk); Cheteshwar Pujara; Wriddhiman Saha (wk); Mohammed Shami; Ishant Sharma; Rohit Sharma; Mohammed Siraj; Hanuma Vihari; Umesh Yadav	Kane Williamson (c); Tom Latham (vc); Tom Blundell (wk); Trent Boult; Devon Conway; Colin de Grandhomme; Matt Henry; Kyle Jamieson; Henry Nicholls; Ajaz Patel; Tim Southee; Ross Taylor; Neil Wagner; BJ Watling (wk); Will Young

On 15 June 2021, New Zealand confirmed their squad of 15 players for the match. Doug Bracewell, Jacob Duffy, Daryl Mitchell, Rachin Ravindra and Mitchell Santner, who were all part of New Zealand's initial squad for the match, were not included in the final 15. On the same day India named their squad of 15 players for the match. Mayank Agarwal, K. S. Bharat, Axar Patel, KL Rahul, Washington Sundar, Shardul Thakur who were all part of their initial squad for the match, were not included in the final 15 member squad.

== Match ==
=== Match officials ===
On 8 June 2021, the ICC announced the match officials for the final.

- On-field umpires: Michael Gough (Eng) and Richard Illingworth (Eng)
- Third umpire: Richard Kettleborough (Eng)
- Reserve umpire: Alex Wharf (Eng)
- Match referee: Chris Broad (Eng)

=== Match details and scorecard ===
18–23 June 2021 (Note: The match was initially planned for five days from 18 to 22 June, but weather delays meant that the scheduled reserve day was used.)
Scorecard

India	v	New Zealand
217 (92.1 overs); Ajinkya Rahane 49 (117); Kyle Jamieson 5/31 (22 overs)		249 (99.2 overs); Devon Conway 54 (153); Mohammed Shami 4/76 (26 overs)
170 (73 overs); Rishabh Pant 41 (88); Tim Southee 4/48 (19 overs)		140/2 (45.5 overs); Kane Williamson 52* (89); Ravichandran Ashwin 2/17 (10 overs)

New Zealand won by 8 wickets
Rose Bowl, Southampton
Umpires: Michael Gough (Eng) and Richard Illingworth (Eng)
Player of the match: Kyle Jamieson (NZ)

- New Zealand won the toss and elected to field.
- No play was possible on days 1 and 4 due to rain.
- 33.2 overs were lost on day 2 due to bad light.
- The planned reserve day was used to make up time lost earlier in the match.
- BJ Watling (NZ) played in his last Test.

=== Summary ===
==== Day 1 ====
The first day of play was scheduled to take place on Friday 18 June 2021. As had been forecast, there was heavy rain throughout the day which prevented any play from taking place. The rain stopped in the afternoon, but it had caused the outfield to become waterlogged and the umpires decided to cancel the day's play at 3pm BST. The loss of six hours ensured that the game would continue to the sixth and reserve day on Wednesday 23 June.

==== Day 2 ====
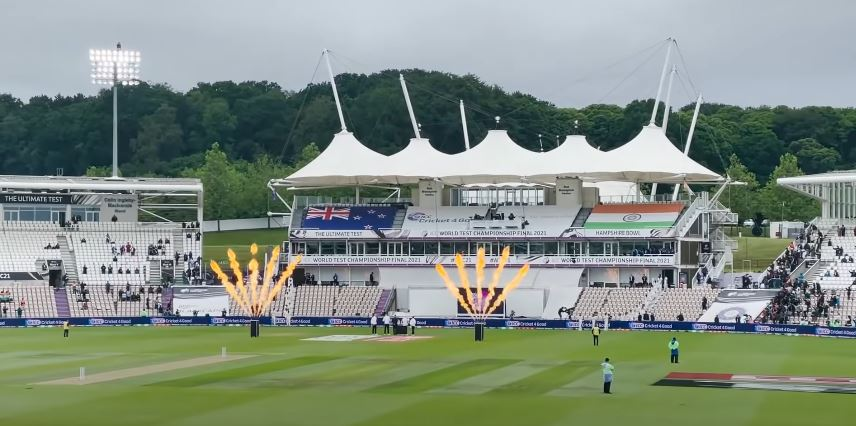
Players and match officials gathering in the field ahead of the start of Day 2 of the inaugural WTC Final

The weather was dry at the start of the second day, and with no rain forecast, play began on time at 10:30am. New Zealand won the toss and elected to field first, putting India in to bat. Captain Kane Williamson said that his decision was due to the cool weather, although he said that he expected a consistent wicket throughout the game. India's opening batsmen, Rohit Sharma and Shubman Gill, began the match strongly by recording an opening partnership of 62 runs. Despite favourable conditions New Zealand's fast bowlers Tim Southee and Trent Boult were unable to bowl consistently. Kyle Jamieson started bowling before lunch and took the first wicket of the match, Rohit Sharma edging a ball to third slip where it was caught by Southee. Gill then fell too, caught off the bowling of Neil Wagner, to leave India at 69 for two at lunch, with Cheteshwar Pujara and Indian captain Virat Kohli the two batsmen.

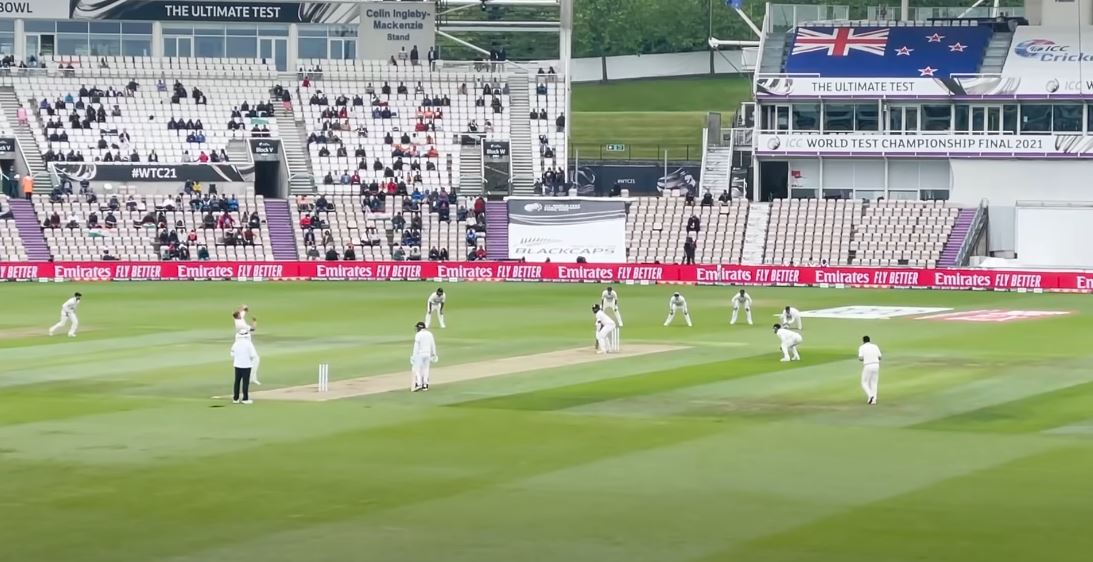
Kyle Jamieson bowling to Cheteshwar Pujara in the inaugural WTC Final

Pujara and Kohli batted cautiously early in their partnership, both before and after lunch, with Pujara taking 50 minutes and 35 balls to score his first run. He then scored successive fours but was dismissed after 16 more runless balls, leg before wicket (lbw) to Boult. The score at that point was 88 for three, with Ajinkya Rahane joining Kohli at the crease. There were several interruptions for bad light during the afternoon session, first forcing an early tea, and then eventually ending the day's play after only 64.4 overs with India on 146. Kohli and Rahane remained as the not out batsmen overnight, on 44 and 29 runs respectively.

==== Day 3 ====
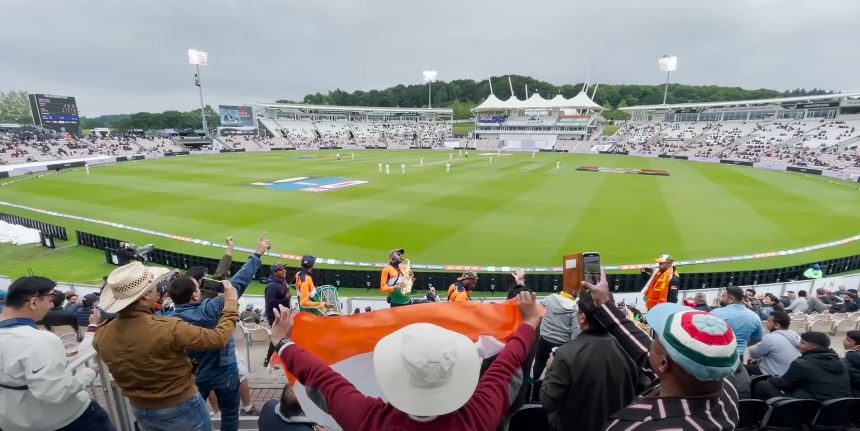
Fans enjoying the WTC Final on Day 3 morning

The third day was another day of rain showers, and play was delayed slightly, beginning at 11am. Kohli fell in the third over of the day, lbw to Jamieson without adding to his overnight score of 44. Rishabh Pant was dismissed a few overs later, caught by Tom Latham at slip off Jamieson's bowling on only 4 runs. Rahane and new batsman Ravindra Jadeja withstood the New Zealand bowling for a while after this, with Rahane advancing his score to 49. He was then dismissed by Wagner, playing a hook shot which was caught at mid wicket. Former Indian player V. V. S. Laxman attributed the wicket to Williamson's captaincy, noting that the captain had set the field differently in successive balls and given Wagner advice regarding Rahane's reputation for being a "compulsive pull shot or hook shot player". Ravichandran Ashwin came to the crease and scored quickly, recording 22 runs from 27 balls and taking India past 200. He lost his wicket shortly afterwards, edging a catch to slip off the bowling of Southee. India were 211 for seven at lunch.

In the third over after lunch, Jamieson took two wickets in two balls, dismissing Ishant Sharma with a ball which was caught at slip, followed by an inswinger which dismissed Jasprit Bumrah for a duck. This gave Jamieson the opportunity to take a hat-trick, but he was unsuccessful as the next ball was hit by Mohammed Shami for four. Nonetheless, Jamieson finished with bowling figures of 5 for 31 from 22 overs, with 12 maiden overs, a performance described by The Guardian's Tanya Aldred as "astonishing". Boult dismissed Jadeja for 15 in the first ball of the next over, leaving India all out for 217, a score which Aldred considered "slightly short of par".

Devon Conway and Tom Latham opened the batting for New Zealand, scoring a partnership of 70 before Latham was caught by Kohli off the bowling of Ashwin. Conway, who batted for a total of three hours during the afternoon, went on to score the game's first half century. India's bowlers were unlucky at times, as New Zealand's batsmen edged several balls from Shami which missed the fielders. India eventually dismissed Conway shortly before the close of play, the batsman making an error in hitting a ball straight to the mid-on fielder off the bowling of fast bowler Ishant Sharma. The umpires then halted play for bad light at around 6:27pm, leaving New Zealand with a score of 101 for two. Williamson and Ross Taylor were the New Zealand batsmen at the close of play.

==== Day 4 ====
The fourth day of the Test was rained out and no play was possible. New Zealand remained at 101 for the loss of two wickets.

==== Day 5 ====
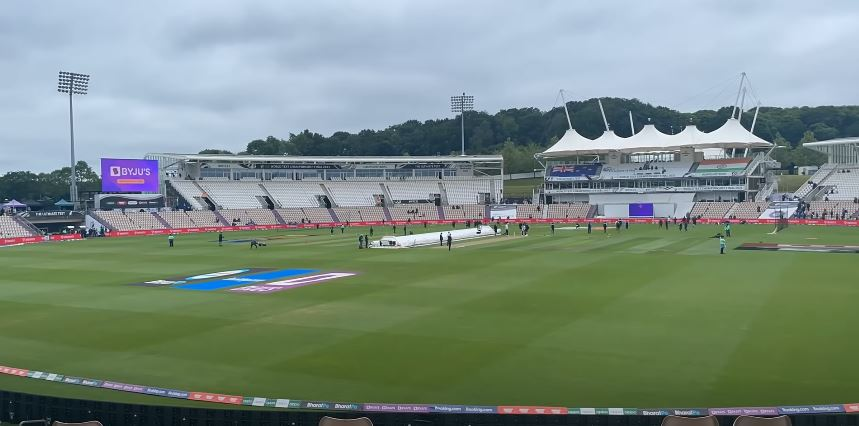
Ageas bowl before the start of the play on day 6

The start of the fifth day was delayed due to rain with play resuming at around 11:30am BST. Ishant Sharma opened the day's bowling with Williamson and Taylor the batsmen. New Zealand got off to a slow start, inching to 117 for two at the end of the first hour of play. Shami and Ishant Sharma then struck, taking the wickets of Taylor, BJ Watling, and Henry Nicholls in the morning session and leaving New Zealand with a score of 135 for five at lunch.

Williamson and new batsman Colin de Grandhomme worked to stabilise the New Zealand innings after lunch, advancing the score to 152 runs by the 80th over when India took the new ball. Shami got the first breakthrough of the afternoon session by dismissing De Grandhomme for 13 runs, lbw off a good length delivery. The Indian fast bowlers attempted to keep the pressure on, but New Zealand's tailenders were able to add an additional 82 runs before the team were all out for 249. Captain Williamson fell just short of a fifty, scoring 49 runs before being caught at second slip by Kohli off the bowling of Sharma.

India started their second innings trailing New Zealand by 32 runs with Rohit Sharma and Gill once again opening the innings. Gill was the first to fall, to Southee, being dismissed lbw for a score of 8 runs with the team at 24 for one, and Rohit Sharma also fell lbw to Southee. India were 64 for two, leading by 32 runs, when play was called off for the day. Pujara and Kohli were the two not out Indian batsmen at the close of play.

==== Day 6 (Reserve Day) ====
The sixth day of the Test was the official reserve day, allocated for weather related delays. India started the day on their overnight score of 64 for the loss of two wickets, with captain Virat Kohli and Cheteshwar Pujara at the crease. The pair only managed to add seven runs before Kohli was out caught behind by the wicket-keeper Watling off the bowling of Jamieson. Jamieson followed it up with the wicket of Pujara in his next over, caught at first slip, leaving India at 72 for four. Rahane was the next batsman out, caught behind by Watling off the bowling of Boult. Pant and Jadeja took the team to lunch at 98 runs for five.

The post-lunch session saw Jadeja falling to medium-pacer Wagner with Watling securing a catch off a nick on the offside. Pant, the last recognised batsman, attempted to add runs quickly, but he then fell to Boult with Nicholls running in from point and catching the ball over his shoulders. Pant had scored 41, the highest score amongst the Indian batsman, and the team was at 157 for seven at that stage. This left the Indian tailenders batting, and they advanced the score to 170 before the team were all out.

New Zealand started off with openers Latham and Conway, chasing a target of 139. The openers scored 33 runs but both were then dismissed by spinner Ashwin, leaving New Zealand at 44 for two. The Guardian's Adam Collins noted that New Zealand had appeared to be heading for an easy victory, but the second wicket prompted him to write "game very much on" in his commentary. Williamson was joined by Taylor, and India then bowled four maiden overs in a row with the score on 46 for two, with New Zealand still needing 93 more runs to win from 31 overs. They began to score more freely again from the 23rd over, however, and Williamson and Taylor remained at the crease for the remainder of the innings as New Zealand advanced to 140 for two in the 46th over, winning the match by eight wickets. Williamson scored a half-century of 52, and Taylor scored 47, ensuring that the New Zealand team comfortably achieved the target, and won the Test match. It was Kohli's third defeat as the captain of India in knockouts and finals of ICC tournaments.

India 1st innings

India batting
Player	Status	Runs	Balls	4s	6s	Strike rate
Rohit Sharma	c Southee b Jamieson	34	68	6	0	50.00
Shubman Gill	c †Watling b Wagner	28	64	3	0	43.75
Cheteshwar Pujara	lbw b Boult	8	54	2	0	14.81
Virat Kohli	lbw b Jamieson	44	132	1	0	33.33
Ajinkya Rahane	c Latham b Wagner	49	117	5	0	41.88
Rishabh Pant	c Latham b Jamieson	4	22	1	0	18.18
Ravindra Jadeja	c †Watling b Boult	15	53	2	0	28.30
Ravichandran Ashwin	c Latham b Southee	22	27	3	0	81.48
Ishant Sharma	c Taylor b Jamieson	4	16	0	0	25.00
Jasprit Bumrah	lbw b Jamieson	0	1	0	0	0.00
Mohammed Shami	not out	4	1	1	0	400.00
Extras	(lb 3, nb 2)	5				
Total	(10 wickets; 92.1 overs)	217		24	0	

Fall of wickets: 1-62 (Rohit, 20.1 ov), 2-63 (Gill, 24.3 ov), 3-88 (Pujara, 40.2 ov), 4-149 (Kohli, 67.4 ov), 5-156 (Pant, 73.4 ov), 6-182 (Rahane, 78.4 ov), 7-205 (Ashwin, 85.5 ov), 8-213 (Ishant, 91.4 ov), 9-213 (Bumrah, 91.5 ov), 10-217 (Jadeja, 92.1 ov)

New Zealand bowling
Bowler	Overs	Maidens	Runs	Wickets	Econ	Wides	NBs
Tim Southee	22	6	64	1	2.90	0	0
Trent Boult	21.1	4	47	2	2.22	0	0
Kyle Jamieson	22	12	31	5	1.40	0	1
Colin de Grandhomme	12	6	32	0	2.66	0	0
Neil Wagner	15	5	40	2	2.66	0	1

New Zealand 1st innings

New Zealand batting
Player	Status	Runs	Balls	4s	6s	Strike rate
Tom Latham	c Kohli b Ashwin	30	104	3	0	28.84
Devon Conway	c Shami b Ishant	54	153	6	0	35.29
Kane Williamson	c Kohli b Ishant	49	177	6	0	27.68
Ross Taylor	c Gill b Shami	11	37	2	0	29.72
Henry Nicholls	c Rohit b Ishant	7	23	1	0	30.43
BJ Watling	b Shami	1	3	0	0	33.33
Colin de Grandhomme	lbw b Shami	13	30	1	0	43.33
Kyle Jamieson	c Bumrah b Shami	21	16	0	1	131.25
Tim Southee	b Jadeja	30	46	1	2	65.21
Neil Wagner	c Rahane b Ashwin	0	5	0	0	0.00
Trent Boult	not out	7	8	1	0	87.50
Extras	(b 4, lb 16, nb 6)	26				
Total	(10 wickets; 99.2 overs)	249		21	3	

Fall of wickets: 1-70 (Latham, 34.2 ov), 2-101 (Conway, 48.4 ov), 3-117 (Taylor, 63.1 ov), 4-134 (Nicholls, 69.3 ov), 5-135 (Watling, 70.2 ov), 6-162 (de Grandhomme, 82.1 ov), 7-192 (Jamieson, 86.6 ov), 8-221 (Williamson, 93.6 ov), 9-234 (Wagner, 96.3 ov), 10-249 (Southee, 99.2 ov)

India bowling
Bowler	Overs	Maidens	Runs	Wickets	Econ	Wides	NBs
Ishant Sharma	25	9	48	3	1.92	0	0
Jasprit Bumrah	26	9	57	0	2.19	0	3
Mohammed Shami	26	8	76	4	2.92	0	0
Ravichandran Ashwin	15	5	28	2	1.86	0	1
Ravindra Jadeja	7.2	2	20	1	2.72	0	2

India 2nd innings

India batting
Player	Status	Runs	Balls	4s	6s	Strike rate
Rohit Sharma	lbw b Southee	30	81	2	0	37.04
Shubman Gill	lbw b Southee	8	33	0	0	24.24
Cheteshwar Pujara	c Taylor b Jamieson	15	80	2	0	18.75
Virat Kohli	c †Watling b Jamieson	13	29	0	0	44.82
Ajinkya Rahane	c †Watling b Boult	15	40	1	0	37.50
Rishabh Pant	c Nicholls b Boult	41	88	4	0	46.59
Ravindra Jadeja	†Watling b Wagner	16	49	2	0	32.65
Ravichandran Ashwin	c Taylor b Boult	7	19	0	0	36.84
Mohammed Shami	c Latham b Southee	13	10	3	0	130.00
Ishant Sharma	not out	1	6	0	0	16.67
Jasprit Bumrah	c Latham b Southee	0	4	0	0	0.00
Extras	(lb 8, nb 1, wd 1, b 1)	11				
Total	(10 wickets; 73 overs)	170		14	0	

Fall of wickets: 1-24 (Gill, 10.4 ov), 2-51 (Rohit, 26.5 ov), 3-71 (Kohli, 35.5 ov), 4-72 (Pujara, 37.3 ov), 5-109 (Rahane, 49.6 ov), 6-142 (Jadeja, 62.5 ov), 7-156 (Pant, 69.2 ov), 8-156 (Ashwin, 69.4 ov), 9-170 (Shami, 72.2 ov), 10-170 (Bumrah, 72.6 ov)

New Zealand bowling
Bowler	Overs	Maidens	Runs	Wickets	Econ	Wides	NBs
Tim Southee	19	4	48	4	2.52	0	0
Trent Boult	15	2	39	3	2.60	0	0
Kyle Jamieson	24	10	30	2	1.25	1	1
Neil Wagner	15	2	44	1	2.93	0	0

New Zealand 2nd innings

New Zealand batting
Player	Status	Runs	Balls	4s	6s	Strike rate
Tom Latham	st Pant b Ashwin	9	41	0	0	21.95
Devon Conway	lbw b Ashwin	19	47	4	0	40.42
Kane Williamson	not out	52	89	8	0	58.42
Ross Taylor	not out	47	100	6	0	47.00
Henry Nicholls						
BJ Watling						
Colin de Grandhomme						
Tim Southee						
Kyle Jamieson						
Neil Wagner						
Trent Boult						
Extras	(lb 11, nb 2)	13				
Total	(2 wickets; 45.5 overs)	140		18	0	

Fall of wickets: 1-33 (Latham, 13.3 ov), 2-44 (Conway, 17.2 ov)

India bowling
Bowler	Overs	Maidens	Runs	Wickets	Econ	Wides	NBs
Ishant Sharma	6.2	2	21	0	3.31	0	0
Mohammed Shami	10.5	3	31	0	2.86	0	0
Jasprit Bumrah	10.4	2	35	0	3.28	0	0
Ravichandran Ashwin	10	5	17	2	1.70	0	0
Ravindra Jadeja	8	1	25	0	3.12	0	2

== Aftermath ==
The match marked the last international appearance for New Zealand's BJ Watling. In May 2021, Watling had announced that he would retire after the World Test Championship final. Watling had also dislocated his ring finger during the first session of the final day of the match when he attempted to collect the ball. However, he continued to keep behind the stumps despite the injury.

New Zealand Cricket arranged a Mace tour, with New Zealand's squad carrying the ICC World Test Championship Mace on a week-long nationwide tour across 10 cities of New Zealand.

== Broadcasting ==
On 15 June 2021, the ICC announced broadcasting and digital distribution plans for the match. Accordingly, the coverage was arranged on television, digital media and radio. Although the ICC did not have an official broadcasting partner for the 2019–2021 ICC World Test Championship, as well as the final match, deals were made for broadcasting with the leading broadcasters in their respective territories.

These deals included the live TV coverage for Star Sports in India (broadcast in five Indian regional languages), Sky Sport in New Zealand, Fox Sports in Australia, SuperSport in Sub-Saharan Africa, Sky Sports in the United Kingdom and especially with multiple options such as Hotstar, ESPN+, Willow TV in the United States of America. The match was also streamed on the ICC.tv platform, which was the service made available where the ICC did not have a broadcast partner for the match. The full broadcasting and digital streaming rights in different territories, were as follows:

Location	Television broadcaster(s)	Digital streaming	Clip rights	Radio broadcaster(s)
Afghanistan	RTA Sport	Rtssport.live	Facebook & ICC Website/App	
Australia	Fox Sports	Kayo, ICC.tv	Kayo, Facebook & ICC Website/App	ABC Grandstand
United Arab Emirates	Etisalat - CricLife	Switch TV	Facebook & ICC Website/App	Talk FM 100.3
Bangladesh	Gazi TV	Rabbithole App	Facebook & ICC Website/App	
Canada	Willow TV	Hotstar	Hotstar, Facebook & ICC Website/App	
All Caribbean islands	Flow Sports	Flow Sports	Facebook & ICC Website/App	
United Kingdom; Ireland	Sky Sports	Sky Go, Now	Skysports.com, Facebook & ICC Website/App	BBC Radio
India	Star Sports	Disney+ Hotstar	Facebook & ICC Website/App	All India Radio
Nepal; Maldives; Bhutan; Sri Lanka	Star Sports		Facebook & ICC Website/ App	
New Zealand	Sky Sport	Sky Sport Now	Spark, Facebook & ICC Website/ App	NZME Radio
Singapore		Hotstar	Hotstar, Facebook & ICC Website/ App	
Sub-Saharan Africa	SuperSport	DStv	Supersport, Facebook & ICC Website/ App	
United States	Willow TV	Hotstar, ESPN+, Hulu	Hotstar, Facebook & ICC Website/ App	
Rest of the World		ICC.tv		
Source: International Cricket Council (unless otherwise stated)

The ICC also named the following panel of commentators for the final:

- Michael Atherton
- Ian Bishop
- Simon Doull
- Sunil Gavaskar
- Isa Guha
- Nasser Hussain
- Dinesh Karthik
- Craig McMillan
- Kumar Sangakkara

=== Viewership ===
Following all these live broadcast arrangements, the final match became the most watched across all series played in this 2019–21 edition. Total cumulative global audience of 177 million was recorded, with live television viewership of 130.6 million across 89 countries. India contributed most of the audience with Star Sports and national broadcaster Doordarshan accounting for 94.6% consumption. ICC's OTT platform ICC.tv resulted in an additional 665,100 live views from over 145 territories outside of the key broadcast markets, while ICC digital and social media platforms reached total views of 515 million across all video content watched during the match window.
