= Goolam Rajah =

South African pharmacist, and cricket administrator and team manager (1946–2021)

- Born: 16 December 1946; Doornfontein, Johannesburg, Union of South Africa
- Died: 29 June 2021 (aged 74); Johannesburg, South Africa
- Other name: Goolie
- Spouse: Shaheda
- Children: 2

Goolam Rajah (16 December 1946 – 29 June 2021) was a South African cricket administrator who served as the manager of the South Africa national cricket team between 1991 and 2011. As the longest-serving manager of South African cricket, he managed the South African side in six World Cups, from the 1992 edition to the 2011 tournament.

Rajah was regarded as one of the pioneers of South African cricket, especially after its readmission into international competition, and was deemed the father figure of South African cricket. He was the manager of South Africa's first ever ODI team.

== Career ==
Rajah pursued his pharmacy degree at the University of Leicester as he was denied a university degree in apartheid South Africa when only whites had such privilege.

A full-time pharmacist, Rajah took up interest in cricket. He was appointed the team manager of the South African cricket team by Cricket South Africa in 1991. His first international assignment as team manager came on the tour of India in 1991 where South Africa played a three-match ODI series against India, with South Africa led by Clive Rice. It was the first international series for South Africa after it was readmitted to international cricket after being banned due to apartheid policies. South Africa eventually lost the series 2–1 but registered their first ever ODI victory under Rajah's tenure as team manager.

Under Rajah's tenure, South Africa had a golden run in international cricket, winning the inaugural edition of the ICC KnockOut Trophy in 1998, a gold medal in the 1998 Commonwealth Games, reaching the semi-finals of the 1999 Cricket World Cup, semi-finals of the 2002 ICC Champions Trophy, test series wins against England in England and against Australia in Australia in 2008. Rajah was also named as the manager for the ICC World XI team against Australia in the 2005 ICC Super Series by the International Cricket Council.

Rajah retired from managing the Proteas team following the 2011 Cricket World Cup where South Africa was eliminated in the quarter-finals against New Zealand. During his term as manager of the national team, a total of 107 players played in 179 tests, 444 ODIs, and 40 T20Is for South Africa.

Rajah also served on the Gauteng Cricket Board, and as senior provincial selector while co-opted onto the Transvaal Cricket Board executive during the period of unity negotiations.

== Personal life ==
Rajah's grandparents were from Khatoor village near Surat, India. He was married and had two children.

== Death ==
Rajah died in Johannesburg on 29 June 2021, at the age of 74, from COVID-19 after being kept on a ventilator for nearly two months.

Later that day, South African cricket team players wore black armbands during the eve of the team's third T20I match against the West Indies and observed one minute's silence prior to the start of play in his remembrance. South African player Tabraiz Shamsi dedicated the team's one-run victory over the West Indies team to Rajah.
