= Kyle Jamieson =

New Zealand cricketer (born 1994)

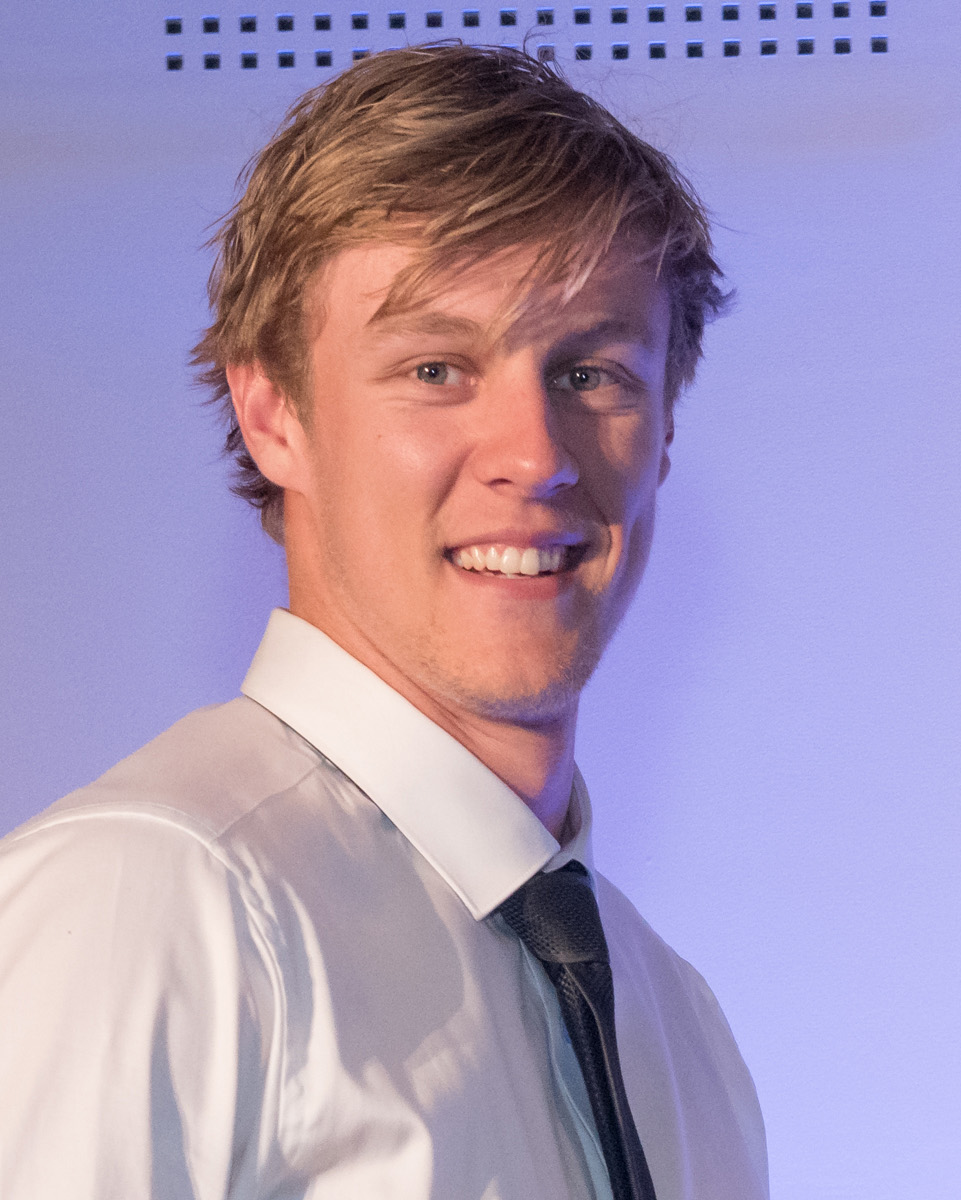
- Jamieson in 2015

Personal information
- Full name: Kyle Alex Jamieson
- Born: 30 December 1994 (age 31); Auckland, New Zealand
- Height: 2.04 m (6 ft 8 in)
- Batting: Right-handed
- Bowling: Right-arm fast-medium
- Role: Bowling all-rounder

International information
- National side: New Zealand (2020–present)
- Test debut (cap 279): 21 February 2020 v India
- Last Test: 17 June 2026 v England
- ODI debut (cap 197): 8 February 2020 v India
- Last ODI: 13 November 2026 v India
- ODI shirt no.: 17
- T20I debut (cap 85): 27 November 2020 v West Indies
- Last T20I: 27 October 2026 v India
- T20I shirt no.: 17

Domestic team information
- Years: Team
- 2016/17–2018/19, 2023/24–present: Canterbury
- 2019/20–2022/23: Auckland
- 2021: Royal Challengers Bangalore
- 2021: Surrey
- 2025: Punjab Kings
- 2026: Delhi Capitals

Career statistics
Competition	Test	ODI	T20I	FC
Matches	21	27	33	54
Runs scored	523	128	95	1,190
Batting average	20.92	21.33	10.55	19.50
100s/50s	0/1	0/0	0/0	0/5
Top score	51*	25*	30	67
Balls bowled	3,948	1,246	691	8,928
Wickets	90	35	32	196
Bowling average	20.23	30.31	34.93	22.07
5 wickets in innings	6	0	0	12
10 wickets in match	1	0	0	2
Best bowling	6/48	4/41	3/8	8/74
Catches/stumpings	7/–	4/–	8/–	17/–
Medal record
Men's cricket
Representing New Zealand
ICC World Test Championship
Winner	2019–2021
ICC T20 World Cup
Runner-up	2021 UAE & Oman
Runner-up	2026 India & Sri Lanka
ICC Champions Trophy
Runner-up	2025 Pakistan
- Source: ESPNcricinfo, 13 November 2026

Kyle Alex Jamieson (born 30 December 1994) is a New Zealand international cricketer. He plays for Canterbury in domestic cricket and Delhi Capitals in the Indian Premier League. Jamieson was a key member of the New Zealand team that won the 2019–2021 ICC World Test Championship, where he picked up 5 wickets in the first innings and was subsequently won the Player of the Match in the final.

== Early life ==
Jamieson attended Auckland Grammar school and was part of New Zealand's squad for the 2014 ICC Under-19 Cricket World Cup. In his youth, Jamieson played point guard at the New Zealand Breakers academy, but chose cricket over basketball as he was a proficient fast bowler.

== Career ==
Jamieson playing a Test match for New Zealand against India in November 2026

A right-arm fast-medium bowler and useful lower-order batsman, Jamieson is six feet eight inches tall, the tallest person ever to play international cricket for New Zealand. He started out as a batting all-rounder, but in 2012, he was slowly converted to become a bowler under the tutelage of bowling coach, Dayle Hadlee, brother of Richard Hadlee. He made his Twenty20 debut for Canterbury on 4 December 2016 in the 2016–17 Super Smash. In June 2018, he was awarded a contract with Canterbury for the 2018–19 season.

On 1 January 2019, in the match between Auckland Aces and Canterbury Kings in the 2018–19 Super Smash, Jamieson took the best figures by a bowler in a T20 match in New Zealand, and the third-best figures ever, when he took six wickets for seven runs from his four overs. He was the leading wicket-taker in the 2018–19 Super Smash, with 22 dismissals in ten matches.

In December 2019, Jamieson was added to New Zealand's Test squad for their series against Australia, but did not play. In January 2020, he was named in New Zealand's One Day International (ODI) squad for their series against India. He made his ODI debut for New Zealand, against India, on 8 February 2020, and was named the player of the match. Jamieson made his Test debut for New Zealand, against India, on 21 February 2020. In the next match, Jamieson took his first five-wicket haul in Test cricket.

In October 2020, in the second round of matches in the 2020–21 Plunket Shield season, Jamieson took a hat-trick against Central Districts. In November 2020, Jamieson was named in New Zealand's Twenty20 International (T20I) squad for the series against the West Indies. He made his T20I debut for New Zealand on 27 November 2020, against the West Indies.

In January 2021, Jamieson took his best figures in a Test match with 11 for 117 in the second Test against Pakistan. In February 2021, Jamieson was bought by the Royal Challengers Bangalore in the IPL auction ahead of the 2021 Indian Premier League. In June 2021, Jamieson was signed by Surrey County Cricket Club to play matches for them following the conclusion of the 2021 ICC World Test Championship Final. In the 2019–2021 ICC World Test Championship Final, Jamieson was named as the man of the match, after taking seven wickets, including a five-wicket haul in the first innings.

In August 2021, Jamieson was named in New Zealand's squad for the 2021 ICC Men's T20 World Cup. In the annual ICC Awards in January 2022, Jamieson was named in the ICC Men's Test Team of the Year for the year 2021.

Kyle Jamieson has been selected for 2026 ICC T20 World Cup following the withdrawal of Adam Milne with a hamstring injury.
