= World Test Championship =

International cricket championship

ICC World Test Championship
- Tournament logo
- Administrator: International Cricket Council
- Format: Test cricket
- First edition: 2019–2021
- Latest edition: 2025–2027
- Next edition: 2027–2029
- Tournament format: League stage and final
- Number of teams: 9
- Current champion: South Africa (1st title)
- Most successful: New Zealand; Australia; South Africa (1 title each)
- Most runs: (England) Joe Root (6,815)
- Most wickets: (Australia) Mitchell Starc (234)

The ICC World Test Championship (WTC) is a biennial world championship for Test cricket organised by the International Cricket Council (ICC). The winners of the tournament are awarded the Test Mace, which was previously held by the leader of the Test Championship. South Africa are the current champions, having defeated Australia in the 2025 final at Lord's.

WTC league games are organized by the host nation's cricket board, whereas the final is organized directly by the ICC. The inaugural ICC World Test Championship started with the 2019 Ashes series and finished with New Zealand lifting the trophy after defeating India in the final in June 2021. The second ICC World Test Championship started on 4 August 2021 with the England–India series and finished with Australia lifting the trophy after defeating India in the final in June 2023. The third ICC World Test Championship started on 16 June 2023 with the 2023 Ashes series and concluded with South Africa defeating Australia in the final. The current ICC World Test Championship began with Bangladesh touring Sri Lanka and will conclude at The Oval, London

== History ==
Men's World Test Championship winners
WTC Cycle	Champions
2019–21	New Zealand
2021–23	Australia
2023–25	South Africa

This championship was first proposed in 1996 by Clive Lloyd, former cricketer and then manager of the West Indies team. Later, in 2009, when the ICC met the MCC to discuss a proposed Test match championship. Former New Zealand captain Martin Crowe was one of the main brains behind this proposal.

In July 2010 ICC chief executive Haroon Lorgat suggested a quadrennial tournament with the four best-ranked nations meeting in the semi-finals and a final, in a bid to boost flagging interest in the longest form of the sport. The first tournament was meant to replace the 2013 ICC Champions Trophy in England and Wales.

The idea of a Test championship was considered by the ICC Chief Executives' Committee at a meeting at their headquarters in Dubai in mid-September 2010. ICC spokesperson Colin Gibson said that much more would be revealed after the meeting, and that if the championship was held in England, then the favoured final venue would be Lord's. As expected, the ICC approved the plan and said that the first tournament would be held in England and Wales in 2013. The format of the tournament was also announced. It would comprise an inaugural league stage, played over a period of four years, with all ten current Test cricket nations (Australia, India, England, South Africa, Pakistan, Sri Lanka, New Zealand, West Indies, Zimbabwe, and Bangladesh) participating. After the league stage the top four teams will take part in the play-offs, with the final determining the Test cricket champions.

There was a debate as to whether the play-off would take place between the top eight teams or the top four teams, but the latter was unanimously chosen by the board. It was also announced that the tournament would replace the ICC Champions Trophy. No decision had been made concerning how to decide the outcome of drawn matches in the knock-out stages.

However, in 2011, the ICC announced that the Test Championship would not take place until 2017, and that the 2013 tournament would be cancelled because of financial problems within the board, and its commitment to its sponsors and broadcasters. England and Wales, the original hosts of this cancelled tournament, were awarded the 2013 ICC Champions Trophy instead, the tournament that the Test Championship was intended to replace. This drew widespread criticism; both Greg Chappell and Graeme Smith criticised the ICC, saying that postponing the Test Championship was wrong and unjustified. The Guardian reported that this postponement was a blow to Lord's, which had been expected to host the final.

At the ICC Chief Executives' meeting in April 2012, it was confirmed that the ICC Champions Trophy would be last held in 2013 with the inaugural Test Championship play-offs being scheduled for June 2017. The ICC said that there would be only one trophy for each format of the game, which meant that the Champions Trophy would no longer take place since the Cricket World Cup is the premier event for 50-over cricket.

The final would possibly have followed the historical timeless test format. Further improvements in the structure of the championship have also been discussed.

However, in January 2014, the 2017 ICC World Test Championship was cancelled and the 2017 ICC Champions Trophy was reinstated.

In October 2017, the ICC announced that a Test league had been agreed upon by its members, which would involve the top nine teams playing series over two years with the top two teams qualifying for a World Test League Championship Final, which will be considered as an ICC event.

== Tournament summary ==
=== 9-Team Tournaments ===
The first tournament began with the 2019 Ashes series. In March 2020, matches were suspended due to the COVID-19 pandemic, not resuming before July 2020, with several rounds of matches being postponed or ultimately cancelled. New Zealand became the first team to qualify for the final, when it was confirmed that the series between South Africa and Australia would not proceed, followed by India. The inaugural World Test Championship Final was played between India and New Zealand from 18 to 23 June 2021 at Rose Bowl, Southampton, England. Despite the opening and fourth day of the final being washed out by rain, New Zealand managed to win in the final session of the reserve day and lifted the first World Test Championship trophy.

The WTC 2021–23 cycle began in August 2021 with Pataudi Trophy (5 matches series between India and England). The International Cricket Council officially announced the full programme with a new points system. Australia qualified for the final by winning the 3rd Test Match of the 2022–23 Border-Gavaskar Trophy. India qualified after Sri Lanka failed to win the first match of their series in New Zealand, qualifying for the final for the second consecutive time. The final was played from 7 June to 11 June 2023 at The Oval, London, England, with Australia emerging as champions after defeating India by 209 runs. This was India's second consecutive defeat at the WTC final.

The WTC 2023–25 cycle began with the 1st Ashes Test on 16 June 2023. The International Cricket Council officially announced that the WTC final will be played at Lord's in the summer of 2025. In the final, South Africa defeated Australia by 5 wickets to win their maiden championship. This was also their second ICC trophy after the 1998 KnockOut Trophy. Aiden Makram was awarded Player of the Match.

=== 12-Team Championship ===
The 2027–2029 tournament is expected to include all 12 Test-playing nations, featuring Afghanistan, Zimbabwe, and Ireland. With plans for a two-tier system with promotion and relegation scrapped, the ICC is expected to include four-day tests for smaller nations. This will allow weaker teams to play a similar amount of tests as stronger teams.

== Results ==
Cycle	No. of teams	Final					
Cycle	No. of teams	Venue	Winners	Result	Runners-up	Winning captain	Player of the final
2019–2021	9	Rose Bowl, Southampton	New Zealand 249 & 140/2	New Zealand won by 8 wickets Scorecard	India 217 & 170	Kane Williamson	Kyle Jamieson (New Zealand)
2021–2023	9	The Oval, London	Australia 469 & 270/8d	Australia won by 209 runs Scorecard	India 296 & 234	Pat Cummins	Travis Head (Australia)
2023–2025	9	Lord's, London	South Africa 138 & 282/5	South Africa won by 5 wickets Scorecard	Australia 212 & 207	Temba Bavuma	Aiden Markram (South Africa)
2025–2027	9	The Oval, London					
2027–2029	TBD						

== Team performances ==
=== Overview ===
As of 20 November 2026.

Team	Statistics						Best performance
Team	Mat.	Won	Lost	Draw	Tied	W%	Best performance
Australia	67	42	16	9	0	62.68	Champions (2021–2023)
South Africa	49	28	19	2	0	57.14	Champions (2023–2025)
New Zealand	45	23	18	4	0	51.11	Champions (2019–2021)
India	67	36	23	8	0	53.73	Runners-up (2019–2021, 2021–2023)
England	81	39	33	9	0	48.14	4th place (2019–2021, 2021–2023)
Sri Lanka	45	13	23	9	0	28.88	5th place (2021–2023)
Pakistan	51	16	27	8	0	31.37	6th place (2019–2021)
Bangladesh	40	8	28	4	0	20.00	7th place (2023–2025)
West Indies	53	13	31	9	0	24.52	8th place (2019–2021, 2021–2023, 2023–2025)

=== By tournament ===
Test playing nations' performances overview
Tournament Team	2019–2021	2021–2023	2023–2025	2025–2027
Australia	3rd	1st	2nd	
Bangladesh	9th	9th	7th	
England	4th	4th	5th	
India	2nd	2nd	3rd	
New Zealand	1st	6th	4th	
Pakistan	6th	7th	9th	
South Africa	5th	3rd	1st	
Sri Lanka	7th	5th	6th	
West Indies	8th	8th	8th	

== Tournament records ==
As of 31 October 2026

Batting
Most runs	(England) Joe Root	6,815
Most hundreds	(England) Joe Root	23
Most runs in a single tournament	(England) Joe Root	1,968 (2023–2025)
Most hundreds in a single tournament	(England) Joe Root	8 (2021–23)
Highest score	(Australia) David Warner v Pakistan	335* (2019–21)
Bowling
Most wickets	(Australia) Mitchell Starc	249
Most wickets in a single tournament	(Australia) Nathan Lyon	88 (2021–23)
Best bowling in an innings	(New Zealand) Ajaz Patel v India	10/119 (2021–23)
Best bowling in a match	(New Zealand) Ajaz Patel v India	14/225 (2021–23)
Fielding
Most dismissals by a wicket-keeper	(Australia) Alex Carey	221
Most dismissals in a single tournament	(Australia) Alex Carey	98 (2023–25)
Most catches by a fielder	(Australia) Steve Smith	128
Most catches in a single tournament	(Australia) Steve Smith	43 (2023–25)
Team
Highest score	England v Pakistan	823/7d (2023–25)
Lowest score	West Indies v Australia	27 (2025–27)

== Trophy ==
The Test Mace was designed and made by British silversmiths, Thomas Lyte. The mace is made of silver and 24-carat gold plate and the base is hardwood. The long handle was designed to represent a stump and the top of the trophy is designed like a cricket ball.

== See also ==
- Cricket World Cup
- ICC Men's T20 World Cup
- ICC Champions Trophy
- ACC Asian Test Championship
- 2005 ICC Super Series
