= Pakistani cricket team in England in 2020 =

International cricket tour

	England	Pakistan
- Dates: 5 August – 1 September 2020
Captains	Joe Root (Tests); Eoin Morgan (T20Is)	Azhar Ali (Tests); Babar Azam (T20Is)

Test series
- Result: England won the 3-match series 1–0
Most runs	Zak Crawley (320)	Azhar Ali (210)
Most wickets	Stuart Broad (13)	Yasir Shah (11)
- Player of the series: Jos Buttler (Eng) and Mohammad Rizwan (Pak)

Twenty20 International series
- Results: 3-match series drawn 1–1
Most runs	Tom Banton (137)	Mohammad Hafeez (155)
Most wickets	Chris Jordan (3)	Shadab Khan (5)
- Player of the series: Mohammad Hafeez (Pak)

The Pakistan cricket team toured England in August and September 2020 to play three Tests and three Twenty20 International (T20I) matches. The Test series formed part of the inaugural 2019–2021 ICC World Test Championship. The first Test and the T20I matches were played at Old Trafford, and the second and third Test matches were played at the Rose Bowl. All of the fixtures were played behind closed doors due to the COVID-19 pandemic.

On 5 August 2020, the International Cricket Council (ICC) announced the use of technology to monitor front-foot no-balls for the first time in Test cricket. The third umpire called the front-foot no-balls and communicated this with the on-field umpires. This followed a successful trial in the One Day International (ODI) matches between England and Ireland in the World Cup Super League, which concluded the day before the Test series.

On the final day of the third Test, England's James Anderson became the first fast bowler to take 600 Test wickets. England won the three-match Test series 1–0, after the second and third Tests were drawn. The T20I series was drawn 1–1, with the first match being washed out.

== Background ==
Ahead of the tour to England, Pakistan were scheduled to play three One Day International (ODI) matches in the Netherlands, and two T20I matches in Ireland; however, in April 2020, the matches in the Netherlands were postponed after the Dutch government banned all events in the country, both sports and cultural, until 1 September 2020 due to the COVID-19 pandemic. Because of the pandemic, the England and Wales Cricket Board (ECB) investigated the possibility of hosting the Test matches in bio-secure environments; Old Trafford in Manchester and the Rose Bowl in Southampton were mooted as possible venues due to their hotel facilities. In May 2020, Wasim Khan, the chief executive of the Pakistan Cricket Board (PCB), was in talks with the ECB about the possibility of touring England; the PCB said they were "very optimistic" with regard to the plans. The PCB planned to send a combined Test and T20I squad of 25 players to give them the best options in case of any injuries. In the same month, Babar Azam was named as the new captain of Pakistan's One Day International (ODI) team. Babar said that he had complete faith and trust in the PCB's decision on touring, and said if it were safe to go, he would definitely join the tour.

In late May 2020, a revised schedule was issued, starting with the first Test match at Old Trafford from 5 August 2020. The choice of Old Trafford for the first Test meant it was the first time since England toured South Africa in 1905–06 that the team had played three Tests in a row at the same ground. On 9 June 2020, the PCB appointed Younis Khan and Mushtaq Ahmed respectively as their batting and spin bowling coaches for the tour. The PCB also decided not to hold a training camp for the national team in Lahore, and the board worked with the ECB to bring their travel date forward by a week. On 11 June 2020, the PCB confirmed that Mohammad Amir and Haris Sohail were not available to tour England for personal reasons. On 12 June 2020, the PCB named a 29-man squad for the tour; the Test side would be captained by Azhar Ali and the T20I side by Babar Azam. After the squad was named, Wahab Riaz said that he would be willing to play Test cricket again, after taking a break from first-class cricket in September 2019.

The PCB announced that the touring party would go through three rounds of COVID-19 testing prior to leaving Pakistan, and would be tested every five days once in England. On 22 June 2020, the PCB confirmed that Haider Ali, Shadab Khan and Haris Rauf had all tested positive for the virus. None of the three players had shown any previous symptoms, and were all advised to go into a period of self-isolation. England's director of cricket, Ashley Giles, said he was "concerned" by the news, but said that the tour was not in doubt. However, the following day, seven more players tested positive for the virus. Despite the increase in positive tests, Wasim Khan said that the tour was still on, and the team planned to depart for England as scheduled. Anyone who tested positive would be allowed to rejoin the squad after they finished their quarantine period and returned two negative tests. Mohammad Hafeez, one of the seven players to test positive on 23 June 2020, tested negative the following day, after taking a private test to get a second opinion. Six of the ten players who initially tested positive returned a negative when they were tested again. On 27 June 2020, the PCB confirmed that 20 players and 11 members of their support staff would be travelling to England. The flight departed from Allama Iqbal International Airport the following morning, and arrived in Manchester later the same day. On 30 June 2020, the six players that tested negative after initially testing positive, provided a second negative test, and travelled to England as soon as possible. They were joined by three more players who provided two negative tests in four days. In July 2020, Wasim Khan admitted that the PCB came under pressure over whether to tour England after so many players returned a positive test.

In June 2020, the International Cricket Council (ICC) made several interim changes to the Playing Conditions due to the pandemic. A substitute could be used for any player showing symptoms of COVID-19, but only in a Test match. Players were banned from using saliva to shine the ball and five penalty runs would be awarded to the opposition for repeated infringements. The requirement to use neutral match officials was temporarily lifted, and the number of DRS reviews for each team in each innings was increased, as the available umpires were less experienced at international level. Following criticism of play being lost in the second Test due to bad light, the ECB agreed that play in the third Test could start half an hour early, at 10:30am, if time was lost during the match due to the weather.

The second T20I match was shown free-to-air on BBC One in the United Kingdom, the first time since 1999 that a live cricket match was broadcast on BBC Television. Graham Thorpe, England's interim head coach, said that it provides a "great opportunity for cricket".

== Squads ==
Tests		T20Is	
England	Pakistan	England	Pakistan
Joe Root (c); Ben Stokes (vc); James Anderson; Jofra Archer; Dom Bess; Stuart Broad; Rory Burns; Jos Buttler (wk); Zak Crawley; Sam Curran; Ollie Pope; Ollie Robinson; Dom Sibley; Chris Woakes; Mark Wood	Azhar Ali (c); Babar Azam (vc); Mohammad Abbas; Shaheen Afridi; Sarfaraz Ahmed (wk); Fawad Alam; Abid Ali; Kashif Bhatti; Shadab Khan; Sohail Khan; Shan Masood; Mohammad Rizwan (wk); Asad Shafiq; Naseem Shah; Yasir Shah; Imam-ul-Haq	Eoin Morgan (c); Moeen Ali; Jonny Bairstow (wk); Tom Banton; Sam Billings; Tom Curran; Joe Denly; Lewis Gregory; Chris Jordan; Saqib Mahmood; Dawid Malan; Adil Rashid; ~~Jason Roy~~; David Willey	Babar Azam (c); Shaheen Afridi; Iftikhar Ahmed; Sarfaraz Ahmed (wk); Haider Ali; Mohammad Amir; Mohammad Hafeez; Mohammad Hasnain; Shadab Khan; Shoaib Malik; Haris Rauf; Wahab Riaz; Mohammad Rizwan (wk); Khushdil Shah; Naseem Shah; Imad Wasim; Fakhar Zaman

On 12 June 2020, the PCB named a touring squad of 29 players for both the Test and T20I matches. The PCB also named Bilal Asif, Imran Butt, Muhammad Musa and Mohammad Nawaz as reserve players for the tour. On 27 July 2020, the PCB shortlisted a 20-man squad for the Test series. On 4 August 2020, this was trimmed down to a 16-man squad ahead of the first Test.

On 27 June 2020, due to the high number of positive tests for COVID-19, Rohail Nazir was also added to Pakistan's touring party. Zafar Gohar, who is based in England, joined the team when they arrived in the country, but only took part in pre-match preparations. Kashif Bhatti returned a positive COVID-19 test while in England, but was able to rejoin the squad on 16 July 2020 after two negative tests and a period of self-isolation. On 20 July 2020, Mohammad Amir was added to Pakistan's squad for the T20I matches, following the early birth of his second child; Amir had initially ruled himself out of travelling to England. Amir replaced Haris Rauf, after Rauf provided five positive tests out of six for COVID-19 in the last month. On 30 July 2020, the PCB confirmed that Rauf had returned two consecutive negative tests, and was therefore eligible to fly to England to join the Pakistan squad. On 12 August, Mohammad Hafeez had to self-isolate after breaking biosecurity protocols by posing for a photo with a member of the public at the golf course adjoining the Rose Bowl. Hafeez underwent a COVID-19 test the same afternoon, and returned to the squad the following day, after the test was negative.

On 29 July 2020, England named their squad for the first Test, which was unchanged from the side that had beaten the West Indies the previous day. James Bracey, Ben Foakes, Dan Lawrence and Jack Leach were also named as reserve players for the opening fixture. On 9 August 2020, Ben Stokes withdrew from the squad for the final two Test matches to travel to New Zealand due to family reasons; Ollie Robinson was called up in his place. The following day, Lawrence left the England squad to attend a family bereavement, but no replacement for Lawrence was named. On 12 August 2020, Robinson was named in England's squad for the second Test.

On 18 August 2020, the ECB named their 14-man squad for the T20Is, also naming Pat Brown, Liam Livingstone and Reece Topley as reserve players. Ahead of the T20I matches, Jason Roy was ruled out of the series, after suffering a side strain.

== Practice matches ==
Pakistan were due to play two tour matches, a first-class match against a Select XI side, and a 20-over match against Leicestershire. However, the tour matches were cancelled due to the COVID-19 pandemic. Instead, Pakistan played intra-squad matches to serve as preparation. A two-day practice match took place in Worcester, ahead of two four-day matches in Derby. On the morning of the second four-day match, the PCB announced that the match would have first-class status.

11–12 July 2020

PCB Green	v	PCB White
318/8 (90 overs); Babar Azam 82; Shaheen Afridi 4/91		338/5 (89.1 overs); Iftikhar Ahmed 86; Babar Azam 1/0

Match drawn
New Road, Worcester

17–20 July 2020
Scorecard

Team White	v	Team Green
249 (93.5 overs); Mohammad Rizwan 54* (130); Naseem Shah 5/55 (17.5 overs)		181 (65.1 overs); Asad Shafiq 51 (136); Sohail Khan 5/50 (20.1 overs)
284/5d (83.4 overs); Mohammad Rizwan 100* (159); Yasir Shah 2/52 (15 overs)		354/4 (88.1 overs); Azhar Ali 120 (225); Shaheen Afridi 1/23 (10 overs)

Team Green won by 6 wickets
County Cricket Ground, Derby
Umpires: Steve O'Shaughnessy (Eng) and Martin Saggers (Eng)

- Team White won the toss and elected to bat.

24–27 July 2020
Scorecard

Team Green	v	Team White
113 (47.1 overs); Babar Azam 32 (77); Sohail Khan 5/37 (16 overs)		198 (78.3 overs); Fawad Alam 43 (150); Naseem Shah 4/52 (21 overs)
133/3 (48 overs); Shan Masood 49 (73); Faheem Ashraf 1/17 (9 overs)

Match drawn
County Cricket Ground, Derby
Umpires: Steve O'Shaughnessy (Eng) and Alex Wharf (Eng)

- Team White won the toss and elected to field.
- Only 7 overs were bowled on day 2 due to rain. No play was possible on day 4 due to rain.

== Test series ==
=== 1st Test ===
5–9 August 2020 (Note: While five days of play were scheduled for each Test, the first Test reached a result in four days.)
Scorecard

Pakistan	v	England
326 (109.3 overs); Shan Masood 156 (319); Stuart Broad 3/54 (22.3 overs)		219 (70.3 overs); Ollie Pope 62 (117); Yasir Shah 4/66 (18 overs)
169 (46.4 overs); Yasir Shah 33 (24); Stuart Broad 3/37 (10 overs)		277/7 (82.1 overs); Chris Woakes 84* (120); Yasir Shah 4/99 (30 overs)

England won by 3 wickets
Old Trafford, Manchester
Umpires: Richard Illingworth (Eng) and Richard Kettleborough (Eng)
Player of the match: Chris Woakes (Eng)

- Pakistan won the toss and elected to bat.
- 41 overs of play were lost on day 1 due to rain and bad light.
- World Test Championship points: England 40, Pakistan 0.

After winning the toss and electing to bat, Pakistan openers Shan Masood and Abid Ali put on 36 runs for the first wicket, before Abid was bowled by Jofra Archer with the first ball of the 16th over. Captain Azhar Ali fell next to Chris Woakes, trapped lbw for a duck after facing just six balls. The next man in, Babar Azam, reached his fifty in 70 balls, ahead of Masood, and just before a rain delay and an early tea interval. Just eight more overs were bowled before the day's play was called to an early close with Pakistan on 139/2, Babar having reached 69 and Masood still four runs short of his half-century.

James Anderson opened the bowling to start the second day, as he had on day 1, and it took him just six balls to remove Babar, caught at first slip by England captain Joe Root for a wicket maiden. Masood then reached his fifty in the following over from Stuart Broad, off a more patient 156 balls. Asad Shafiq fell for seven runs seven overs later, edging a ball from Broad to second slip, followed by Mohammad Rizwan, who was caught behind by Jos Buttler for nine runs for Woakes' second wicket of the innings shortly before the lunch interval. After lunch, Masood and Shadab Khan combined for another fifty-partnership, before Masood reached his third century in his last three Test innings (and the fourth of his career) off 251 balls. The pair batted on to reach the first century partnership of the match, but just two overs later, the spin bowling of Dom Bess tempted Shadab into a slog that came off his top edge and was caught by Root at mid-on. Masood reached 150 runs in the final over before tea, but not before Archer took two more wickets in consecutive balls; first, Yasir Shah was trapped lbw and then Mohammad Abbas was caught at first slip. Masood lasted only until the second over of the session, trapped lbw by Broad with his first ball of the evening, which left just Shaheen Afridi and Naseem Shah. They managed just nine more runs before Shah edged a ball from Broad to Buttler behind the stumps to end the innings at 326. England's first innings began poorly with the loss of three wickets for just 12 runs; after review, Rory Burns was trapped lbw by Afridi, while Abbas had Dom Sibley lbw and then bowled Ben Stokes. Root and Ollie Pope then added 50 to the total for the fourth wicket, only for Root to edge a ball from Yasir Shah to wicket-keeper Rizwan, before Buttler and Pope combined to push England towards 100 runs at the close of play; at the end of the day, Pope was on 46 and England were on 92/4.

Pope reached his fifty early on the third day, but the scoring rate was slow, and shortly after he and Buttler had reached their fifty-partnership, Pope was caught in the gully for 62 off the bowling of Naseem Shah. Buttler and Woakes then batted through to the lunch break, but the second over after the interval saw Yasir Shah beat Buttler's bat with a delivery that went on to hit off stump, and the England batsman was out for 38. Shah also took the next two wickets at regular intervals, as Bess edged him to slip for 1 before Woakes suffered the same fate as Buttler, out bowled. It was then left to Shadab Khan to finish off the England tail, finding the edge of Archer's bat for a catch by Rizwan before trapping Anderson lbw. With Broad not out on 29, England closed their innings on 219 runs, trailing by 107. Pakistan sought to add to their lead with two days and a little over a session left to play, but the hero of their first innings, Shan Masood, was unable to repeat his exploits, out for a duck after a thin edge behind off Broad in the second over. Abid Ali and Azhar Ali got Pakistan through the tea interval, but little further as Abid Ali was tempted into a big shot by Bess, only to see the ball come off the top edge of his bat and caught in the deep by Woakes for 20. Woakes himself then removed Babar Azam for 5, caught in the slips by Stokes, and Azhar Ali, trapped lbw for 18. Asad Shafiq and Mohammad Rizwan put on 38 for the fifth wicket, but a direct hit of the stumps by Sibley saw Shafiq run out for 29 while attempting a quick single. Stokes struck a few overs later, after a Pakistan review confirmed that his delivery to Rizwan would have gone on to hit the stumps; England then used a review in the next over to consign Shadab Khan to the same fate after umpire Richard Illingworth had initially ruled Broad's delivery not out. In the final over of the day, Stokes struck again as a short ball came off the splice of Shaheen Afridi's bat and looped to Rory Burns in the gully. Pakistan finished the day on 137/8, with a lead of 244.

In an attempt to set a defendable target for England's batsmen to chase, Pakistan came out with aggressive intent; Yasir Shah hit three fours and a six before edging a ball from Broad behind to Buttler. Naseem Shah showed the same spirit, hitting a four off his first ball, but he was bowled by Archer in the very next over to bring Pakistan's innings to a close on a score of 169. England thus came out with a target of 277 to win the match, and almost two days to get them in. Burns started the brighter of the two openers, scoring 10 runs off the first five overs, but his scoring was throttled back and with the first ball of the 11th over, he was trapped lbw by Abbas without having added to his score. Sibley had passed him, meanwhile, and he and Root worked to add 64 runs to the total before he was tempted into a big shot by Yasir Shah that was edged to the slips with the pair on 36 each. Root was next to go three overs later, as Naseem Shah found his edge to dismiss the England captain for 42. The wicket of Stokes (9) another three overs later, also caught behind off Shah, continued England's mini-collapse, and the loss of Pope for 7 left them at 117/5, still 160 runs from victory. Buttler and Woakes managed to pick up 50 of the required runs before tea, and the pair each reached half-centuries in the 10th over of the final session of the day, followed by the century partnership a few overs later. Buttler ultimately reached 75 before he was trapped lbw by Yasir Shah while attempting a reverse sweep, ending the partnership at 139 runs. Having scored 29 off 25 balls in the first innings, England sent out Broad to join Woakes in the hunt for the remaining 21 runs; he ultimately contributed seven runs to a partnership of 17 as Woakes continued to hold up his end, Broad out lbw to Shah. Bess survived the remainder of that over, leaving Woakes on strike to face Shaheen Afridi with four runs needed; off the first ball of the over, Woakes edged the ball through the slip cordon to the boundary for the required runs. For his unbeaten innings of 84 runs, Woakes was named player of the match.

=== 2nd Test ===
13–17 August 2020
Scorecard

Pakistan	v	England
236 (91.2 overs); Mohammad Rizwan 72 (139); Stuart Broad 4/56 (27.2 overs)		110/4d (43.1 overs); Zak Crawley 53 (99); Mohammad Abbas 2/28 (14 overs)

Match drawn
Rose Bowl, Southampton
Umpires: Michael Gough (Eng) and Richard Kettleborough (Eng)
Player of the match: Mohammad Rizwan (Pak)

- Pakistan won the toss and elected to bat.
- Only 45.4 and 40.2 overs were bowled on days 1 and 2 respectively due to rain and bad light.
- No play was possible on day 3 due to rain and bad light.
- Only 10.2 overs were bowled on day 4 due to rain and bad light.
- Only 38.1 overs were bowled on day 5 due to rain and a wet outfield.
- World Test Championship points: England 13, Pakistan 13.

=== 3rd Test ===
21–25 August 2020
Scorecard

England	v	Pakistan
583/8d (154.4 overs); Zak Crawley 267 (393); Fawad Alam 2/46 (12 overs)		273 (93 overs); Azhar Ali 141* (272); James Anderson 5/56 (23 overs)
		187/4 (83.1 overs) (f/o); Babar Azam 63* (92); James Anderson 2/45 (19 overs)

Match drawn
Rose Bowl, Southampton
Umpires: Michael Gough (Eng) and Richard Illingworth (Eng)
Player of the match: Zak Crawley (Eng)

- England won the toss and elected to bat.
- Only 56 overs were bowled on day 4 due to rain and bad light.
- Only 27.1 overs were bowled on day 5 due to rain and a wet outfield.
- Zak Crawley (Eng) scored his maiden century and his maiden double century in Tests.
- Zak Crawley and Jos Buttler set a new record for the highest fifth-wicket partnership by England in Tests with 359 runs.
- Azhar Ali (Pak) scored his 6,000th run in Tests.
- James Anderson (Eng) became the fourth cricketer to take 600 wickets in Tests. He was also the first pace bowler and first Englishman to reach this milestone.
- Babar Azam (Pak) scored his 2,000th run in Tests.
- World Test Championship points: England 13, Pakistan 13.

== T20I series ==
=== 1st T20I ===
28 August 2020
18:00 (N)
Scorecard

England; 131/6 (16.1 overs)	v	Pakistan
Tom Banton 71 (42); Imad Wasim 2/31 (4 overs)

No result
Old Trafford, Manchester
Umpires: Mike Burns (Eng) and Alex Wharf (Eng)

- Pakistan won the toss and elected to field.
- Rain during England's innings prevented any further play.
- Shadab Khan (Pak) took his 50th wicket in T20Is.

=== 2nd T20I ===
30 August 2020
14:15
Scorecard

Pakistan; 195/4 (20 overs)	v	England; 199/5 (19.1 overs)
Mohammad Hafeez 69 (36); Adil Rashid 2/32 (4 overs)		Eoin Morgan 66 (33); Shadab Khan 3/34 (4 overs)

England won by 5 wickets
Old Trafford, Manchester
Umpires: David Millns (Eng) and Martin Saggers (Eng)
Player of the match: Eoin Morgan (Eng)

- England won the toss and elected to field.
- Mohammad Hafeez became the second batsman for Pakistan to score 2,000 runs, and the first cricketer to score 2,000 runs and take 50 wickets in T20Is.
- This was Pakistan's highest total against England in T20Is.
- This was the highest successful run chase by any team against Pakistan in T20Is.

=== 3rd T20I ===
1 September 2020
18:00 (N)
Scorecard

Pakistan; 190/4 (20 overs)	v	England; 185/8 (20 overs)
Mohammad Hafeez 86* (52); Chris Jordan 2/29 (4 overs)		Moeen Ali 61 (33); Wahab Riaz 2/26 (4 overs)

Pakistan won by 5 runs
Old Trafford, Manchester
Umpires: Mike Burns (Eng) and David Millns (Eng)
Player of the match: Mohammad Hafeez (Pak)

- England won the toss and elected to field.
- Haider Ali (Pak) made his T20I debut and became the first batsman for Pakistan to score fifty on T20I debut.
