= English cricket team in India in 2020–21 =

International cricket tour

| | India | England |
- Dates: 5 February – 28 March 2021
| Captains | Virat Kohli | Joe Root (Tests); Eoin Morgan (ODIs & T20Is) (Note: Jos Buttler captained England for the last two ODIs.) |

Test series
- Result: India won the 4-match series 3–1
| Most runs | Rohit Sharma (345) | Joe Root (368) |
| Most wickets | Ravichandran Ashwin (32) | Jack Leach (18) |
- Player of the series: Ravichandran Ashwin (Ind)

One Day International series
- Results: India won the 3-match series 2–1
| Most runs | KL Rahul (177) | Jonny Bairstow (219) |
| Most wickets | Shardul Thakur (7) | Mark Wood (5) |
- Player of the series: Jonny Bairstow (Eng)

Twenty20 International series
- Results: India won the 5-match series 3–2
| Most runs | Virat Kohli (231) | Jos Buttler (172) |
| Most wickets | Shardul Thakur (8) | Jofra Archer (7) |
- Player of the series: Virat Kohli (Ind)

The England cricket team toured India during February and March 2021 to play four Test matches, three One Day International (ODI) and five Twenty20 International (T20I) matches. The Tests formed part of the inaugural 2019–2021 ICC World Test Championship, and the ODI series formed part of the inaugural 2020–2023 ICC Cricket World Cup Super League. In December 2020, the full itinerary was released with three venues hosting the entire tour.

England won the first Test by 227 runs, and India won the second Test by 317 runs, to level the series at 1–1. The third Test, a day/night fixture, was completed inside two days, with India winning by ten wickets. The loss meant that England could no longer qualify for the final of the World Test Championship. India won the fourth and final Test by an innings and 25 runs, taking the series 3–1. The series win meant that India joined New Zealand in the final of the World Test Championship.

India won the fourth T20I match by eight runs, to level the series 2–2 with one match to play. India won the fifth and final T20I by 36 runs, to win the series 3–2. India won the first ODI by 66 runs, with England winning the second ODI by six wickets to level the series ahead of the final ODI of the tour. India won the third ODI by seven runs, winning the series 2–1.

== Background ==
Originally, England were scheduled to tour India in September and October 2020 to play the ODI and T20I matches. However, after the 2020 ICC Men's T20 World Cup was postponed by one year due to the COVID-19 pandemic, the 2020 Indian Premier League (IPL) was rescheduled to be played in its place. In February 2020, the Board of Control for Cricket in India (BCCI) announced that they would like to play a day/night Test match at the refurbished Narendra Modi Stadium. The England and Wales Cricket Board (ECB) confirmed the changes to England's tour in August 2020.

On 20 August 2020, Sourav Ganguly, president of the BCCI, said that India would host England to fulfil their Future Tours Programme (FTP) commitments. In September 2020, the BCCI were also in discussions with the Emirates Cricket Board with regards to using the United Arab Emirates to host the series, due to the COVID-19 situation. Later the same month, Sourav Ganguly reiterated that it was a "priority" to host the matches in India, and that the BCCI were continuing to monitor the COVID-19 situation.

The tour's itinerary originally was scheduled to have five Tests, three ODIs and three T20I matches. However, in November 2020, Sourav Ganguly confirmed that one of the Test matches had been dropped with two more T20I matches added to the tour, in preparation for the 2021 ICC Men's T20 World Cup. On 1 January 2021, the Government of India announced that up to 50% of fans would be allowed in stadiums for sporting events, and it was expected that the BCCI would also allow fans in the stadiums for the series. Initially, the BCCI and the Tamil Nadu Cricket Association (TNCA) took the decision not to allow fans into the stadium for the first two Test matches. However, the decision was later reversed, with up to 50% of fans allowed to attend the second Test. On 27 January 2021, the England team arrived in Chennai to begin their quarantine ahead of the first Test.

The International Cricket Council (ICC) confirmed that Nitin Menon would be one of the on-field umpires for the first two Test matches. Anil Chaudhary and Virender Sharma were also named as on-field umpires for the first and second Tests respectively, with both of them making their debuts as Test cricket umpires. The same set of match officials were retained for the third and fourth Test matches.

Ahead of the first Test, Channel 4 secured the live broadcasting rights for the Test matches. The last time the channel screened live Test cricket in the United Kingdom was for the 2005 Ashes series. It was also the first full broadcast of an England overseas Test series on terrestrial television in the United Kingdom.

Crowds were allowed to attend the first two T20I matches, with more than 66,000 fans attending each of the two games. However, after a rise in COVID-19 cases in Ahmedabad, the BCCI and the Gujarat Cricket Association agreed to play the remaining T20I and ODI matches behind closed doors.

== Squads ==
| Tests | | ODIs | | T20Is | |
| India | England | India | England | India | England |
|---|---|---|---|---|---|
| Virat Kohli (c); Ajinkya Rahane (vc); Mayank Agarwal; Ravichandran Ashwin; Jasprit Bumrah; Rahul Chahar; Shubman Gill; Shahbaz Nadeem; Hardik Pandya; Rishabh Pant (wk); Axar Patel; Cheteshwar Pujara; KL Rahul; Wriddhiman Saha (wk); Ishant Sharma; Rohit Sharma; Mohammed Siraj; Washington Sundar; Shardul Thakur; Kuldeep Yadav; Umesh Yadav | Joe Root (c); Jofra Archer; Moeen Ali; James Anderson; Jonny Bairstow; Dom Bess; Stuart Broad; Rory Burns; Jos Buttler (wk); Zak Crawley; Ben Foakes (wk); Dan Lawrence; Jack Leach; Ollie Pope; Dom Sibley; Ben Stokes; Olly Stone; Chris Woakes; Mark Wood | Virat Kohli (c); Rohit Sharma (vc); Yuzvendra Chahal; Shikhar Dhawan; Shubman Gill; Shreyas Iyer; Prasidh Krishna; Bhuvneshwar Kumar; T. Natarajan; Hardik Pandya; Krunal Pandya; Rishabh Pant (wk); KL Rahul (wk); Mohammed Siraj; Washington Sundar; Shardul Thakur; Kuldeep Yadav; Suryakumar Yadav | Eoin Morgan (c); Moeen Ali; Jonny Bairstow; Sam Billings; Jos Buttler (wk); Sam Curran; Tom Curran; Liam Livingstone; Dawid Malan; Matt Parkinson; Adil Rashid; Jason Roy; Ben Stokes; Reece Topley; Mark Wood | Virat Kohli (c); Rohit Sharma (vc); Yuzvendra Chahal; Deepak Chahar; Rahul Chahar; Varun Chakravarthy; Shikhar Dhawan; Shreyas Iyer; Ishan Kishan (wk); Bhuvneshwar Kumar; T. Natarajan; Hardik Pandya; Rishabh Pant (wk); Axar Patel; KL Rahul; Navdeep Saini; Washington Sundar; Rahul Tewatia; Shardul Thakur; Suryakumar Yadav | Eoin Morgan (c); Moeen Ali; Jofra Archer; Jonny Bairstow (wk); Sam Billings; Jos Buttler (wk); Sam Curran; Tom Curran; Chris Jordan; Liam Livingstone; Dawid Malan; Adil Rashid; Jason Roy; Ben Stokes; Reece Topley; Mark Wood |

On 19 January 2021, the BCCI named India's squad for the first two Test matches. They also named K. S. Bharat, Abhimanyu Easwaran, Shahbaz Nadeem, Rahul Chahar and Priyank Panchal as standby players, and Ankit Rajpoot, Avesh Khan, Sandeep Warrier, Krishnappa Gowtham and Saurabh Kumar as net bowlers. Two days later, the ECB announced England's squad for the first two Test matches, with James Bracey, Mason Crane, Saqib Mahmood, Matt Parkinson, Ollie Robinson and Amar Virdi named as reserve players. Ollie Pope was not originally named in England's Test squad after sustaining an injury against Pakistan, but was added to the squad on 3 February 2021, after the England medical team were satisfied he had recovered sufficiently. The following day, Zak Crawley was ruled out of England's squad for the first two Tests with a wrist sprain. Ahead of the first Test, both Shahbaz Nadeem and Rahul Chahar were added to India's squad, after Axar Patel was ruled out of the match with a knee injury. England's Jos Buttler was rested for the last three Tests. Jofra Archer was ruled out of England's squad for the second Test due to an elbow injury. Ahead of the second Test, both Shahbaz Nadeem and Rahul Chahar were withdrawn from India's squad, returning to the reserves.

Following the conclusion of the second Test, Jonny Bairstow and Mark Wood were added to England's squad for the third Test. Moeen Ali returned home to England, therefore missing the last two Test matches. On 17 February 2021, the BCCI announced the squad for the last two Test matches, with Umesh Yadav joining the team and replacing Shardul Thakur. The BCCI also retained the same five net bowlers, K. S. Bharat and Rahul Chahar as standby players, and released Abhimanyu Easwaran, Shahbaz Nadeem and Priyank Panchal for the Vijay Hazare Trophy. England's Sam Curran was originally going to be available for the fourth Test, but was ruled out of the Test match due to the logistical challenges during the pandemic. Ahead of the fourth Test, Jasprit Bumrah and Chris Woakes were released from India's and England's squads respectively.

On 11 February 2021, England announced their T20I squad with Jake Ball and Matt Parkinson being named as reserves. Danny Briggs, Tom Helm and Will Jacks were also named as non-travelling reserves for England's limited-overs fixtures. Rahul Chahar was added to India's T20I squad, after being one of the standby players for the Test series. On 19 March 2021, India named their ODI squad, with Prasidh Krishna, Krunal Pandya and Suryakumar Yadav earning their maiden call-ups. Two days later, England confirmed their ODI squad, with Jofra Archer being ruled out due to an elbow injury. Jake Ball, Chris Jordan and Dawid Malan remained with the England squad as reserve players. Shreyas Iyer injured his shoulder in the first ODI match, and was ruled out of India's squad for the remaining two fixtures. Eoin Morgan was ruled out of final two ODIs, with Jos Buttler captaining England in Morgan's absence. Sam Billings was also ruled out of the second ODI with Dawid Malan added to England's squad.

== Test series ==
=== 1st Test ===
5–9 February 2021
Scorecard

| England | v | India |
| 578 (190.1 overs); Joe Root 218 (377); Jasprit Bumrah 3/84 (36 overs) | | 337 (95.5 overs); Rishabh Pant 91 (88); Dom Bess 4/76 (26 overs) |
| 178 (46.3 overs); Joe Root 40 (32); Ravichandran Ashwin 6/61 (17.3 overs) | | 192 (58.1 overs); Virat Kohli 72 (104); Jack Leach 4/76 (26 overs) |

England won by 227 runs
M. A. Chidambaram Stadium, Chennai
Umpires: Anil Chaudhary (Ind) and Nitin Menon (Ind)
Player of the match: Joe Root (Eng)

- England won the toss and elected to bat.
- Anil Chaudhary (Ind) stood in his first Test as an umpire.
- Joe Root (Eng) played in his 100th Test.
- Jos Buttler (Eng) played in his 50th Test.
- Joe Root (Eng) scored his 20th century in Tests, and became the first batsman to score a double century in his 100th Test.
- Ishant Sharma (Ind) took his 300th wicket in Tests.
- Jack Leach (Eng) took his 50th wicket in Tests.
- World Test Championship points: England 30, India 0.

=== 2nd Test ===
13–17 February 2021 (Note: While five days of play were scheduled for each Test, the second Test reached a result in four days, the third Test reached a result in two days, and the fourth Test reached a result in three days.)
Scorecard

| India | v | England |
| 329 (95.5 overs); Rohit Sharma 161 (231); Moeen Ali 4/128 (29 overs) | | 134 (59.5 overs); Ben Foakes 42* (107); Ravichandran Ashwin 5/43 (23.5 overs) |
| 286 (85.5 overs); Ravichandran Ashwin 106 (148); Moeen Ali 4/98 (32 overs) | | 164 (54.2 overs); Moeen Ali 43 (18); Axar Patel 5/60 (21 overs) |

India won by 317 runs
M. A. Chidambaram Stadium, Chennai
Umpires: Nitin Menon (Ind) and Virender Sharma (Ind)
Player of the match: Ravichandran Ashwin (Ind)

- India won the toss and elected to bat.
- Axar Patel (Ind) made his Test debut.
- Virender Sharma (Ind) stood in his first Test as an umpire.
- Ravichandran Ashwin (Ind) became the first bowler to dismiss 200 left-handers in Tests.
- Ravichandran Ashwin also became the first cricketer for India to take a five-wicket haul and score a century three times in Tests.
- Axar Patel became the ninth bowler for India to take a five-wicket haul on debut in Tests.
- World Test Championship points: India 30, England 0.

=== 3rd Test ===
24–28 February 2021 (D/N)
Scorecard

| England | v | India |
| 112 (48.4 overs); Zak Crawley 53 (84); Axar Patel 6/38 (21.4 overs) | | 145 (53.2 overs); Rohit Sharma 66 (96); Joe Root 5/8 (6.2 overs) |
| 81 (30.4 overs); Ben Stokes 25 (34); Axar Patel 5/32 (15 overs) | | 49/0 (7.4 overs); Rohit Sharma 25* (25) |

India won by 10 wickets
Narendra Modi Stadium, Ahmedabad
Umpires: Anil Chaudhary (Ind) and Nitin Menon (Ind)
Player of the match: Axar Patel (Ind)

- England won the toss and elected to bat.
- Ishant Sharma (Ind) played in his 100th Test.
- Joe Root (Eng) took his first five-wicket haul in Tests.
- Ravichandran Ashwin (Ind) became the second-fastest bowler, in terms of matches played, to take 400 wickets in Tests (77).
- This was the shortest completed Test match, in terms of balls bowled, since January 1935 (842).
- World Test Championship points: India 30, England 0.

=== 4th Test ===
4–8 March 2021
Scorecard

| England | v | India |
| 205 (75.5 overs); Ben Stokes 55 (121); Axar Patel 4/68 (26 overs) | | 365 (114.4 overs); Rishabh Pant 101 (118); Ben Stokes 4/89 (27.4 overs) |
| 135 (54.5 overs); Dan Lawrence 50 (95); Ravichandran Ashwin 5/47 (22.5 overs) |

India won by an innings and 25 runs
Narendra Modi Stadium, Ahmedabad
Umpires: Nitin Menon (Ind) and Virender Sharma (Ind)
Player of the match: Rishabh Pant (Ind)

- England won the toss and elected to bat.
- Ravichandran Ashwin (Ind) took his 30th five-wicket haul in Tests.
- As a result of this match India qualified for the 2019–2021 ICC World Test Championship finals.
- World Test Championship points: India 30, England 0.

== T20I series ==
=== 1st T20I ===
12 March 2021
19:00 (N)
Scorecard

| India; 124/7 (20 overs) | v | England; 130/2 (15.3 overs) |
| Shreyas Iyer 67 (48); Jofra Archer 3/23 (4 overs) | | Jason Roy 49 (32); Washington Sundar 1/18 (2.3 overs) |

England won by 8 wickets
Narendra Modi Stadium, Ahmedabad
Umpires: K. N. Ananthapadmanabhan (Ind) and Nitin Menon (Ind)
Player of the match: Jofra Archer (Eng)

- England won the toss and elected to field.

=== 2nd T20I ===
14 March 2021
19:00 (N)
Scorecard

| England; 164/6 (20 overs) | v | India; 166/3 (17.5 overs) |
| Jason Roy 46 (35); Washington Sundar 2/29 (4 overs); Shardul Thakur 2/29 (4 overs) | | Virat Kohli 73* (49); Sam Curran 1/22 (4 overs) |

India won by 7 wickets
Narendra Modi Stadium, Ahmedabad
Umpires: K. N. Ananthapadmanabhan (Ind) and Anil Chaudhary (Ind)
Player of the match: Ishan Kishan (Ind)

- India won the toss and elected to field.
- Ishan Kishan and Suryakumar Yadav (Ind) both made their T20I debuts.
- Ishan Kishan became the second Indian batsman to score a fifty on debut.
- Virat Kohli (Ind) became the first male cricketer to score 3,000 runs in T20Is.

=== 3rd T20I ===
16 March 2021
19:00 (N)
Scorecard

| India; 156/6 (20 overs) | v | England; 158/2 (18.2 overs) |
| Virat Kohli 77* (46); Mark Wood 3/31 (4 overs) | | Jos Buttler 83* (52); Washington Sundar 1/26 (4 overs) |

England won by 8 wickets
Narendra Modi Stadium, Ahmedabad
Umpires: Anil Chaudhary (Ind) and Virender Sharma (Ind)
Player of the match: Jos Buttler (Eng)

- England won the toss and elected to field.
- Eoin Morgan became the first male cricketer for England to play in 100 T20Is.
- Jonny Bairstow (Eng) scored his 1,000th run in T20Is.

=== 4th T20I ===
18 March 2021
19:00 (N)
Scorecard

| India; 185/8 (20 overs) | v | England; 177/8 (20 overs) |
| Suryakumar Yadav 57 (31); Jofra Archer 4/33 (4 overs) | | Ben Stokes 46 (23); Shardul Thakur 3/42 (4 overs) |

India won by 8 runs
Narendra Modi Stadium, Ahmedabad
Umpires: K. N. Ananthapadmanabhan (Ind) and Nitin Menon (Ind)
Player of the match: Suryakumar Yadav (Ind)

- England won the toss and elected to field.
- Jonny Bairstow (Eng) played in his 50th T20I.
- Jason Roy (Eng) scored his 1,000th run in T20Is.

=== 5th T20I ===
20 March 2021
19:00 (N)
Scorecard

| India; 224/2 (20 overs) | v | England; 188/8 (20 overs) |
| Virat Kohli 80* (52); Ben Stokes 1/26 (3 overs) | | Dawid Malan 68 (46); Shardul Thakur 3/45 (4 overs) |

India won by 36 runs
Narendra Modi Stadium, Ahmedabad
Umpires: Anil Chaudhary (Ind) and Nitin Menon (Ind)
Player of the match: Bhuvneshwar Kumar (Ind)

- England won the toss and elected to field.
- Dawid Malan (Eng) became the quickest batsman, in terms of innings, to score 1,000 runs in T20Is (24).

== ODI series ==
=== 1st ODI ===
23 March 2021
13:30 (D/N)
Scorecard

| India; 317/5 (50 overs) | v | England; 251 (42.1 overs) |
| Shikhar Dhawan 98 (106); Ben Stokes 3/34 (8 overs) | | Jonny Bairstow 94 (66); Prasidh Krishna 4/54 (8.1 overs) |

India won by 66 runs
Maharashtra Cricket Association Stadium, Pune
Umpires: K. N. Ananthapadmanabhan (Ind) and Nitin Menon (Ind)
Player of the match: Shikhar Dhawan (Ind)

- England won the toss and elected to field.
- Prasidh Krishna and Krunal Pandya (Ind) both made their ODI debuts.
- Krunal Pandya (Ind) scored the fastest fifty on debut in ODIs (26 balls).
- World Cup Super League points: India 10, England 0.

=== 2nd ODI ===
26 March 2021
13:30 (D/N)
Scorecard

| India; 336/6 (50 overs) | v | England; 337/4 (43.3 overs) |
| KL Rahul 108 (114); Reece Topley 2/50 (8 overs) | | Jonny Bairstow 124 (112); Prasidh Krishna 2/58 (10 overs) |

England won by 6 wickets
Maharashtra Cricket Association Stadium, Pune
Umpires: Nitin Menon (Ind) and Virender Sharma (Ind)
Player of the match: Jonny Bairstow (Eng)

- England won the toss and elected to field.
- Liam Livingstone (Eng) made his ODI debut.
- World Cup Super League points: England 10, India 0.

=== 3rd ODI ===
28 March 2021
13:30 (D/N)
Scorecard

| India; 329 (48.2 overs) | v | England; 322/9 (50 overs) |
| Rishabh Pant 78 (62); Mark Wood 3/34 (7 overs) | | Sam Curran 95* (83); Shardul Thakur 4/67 (10 overs) |

India won by 7 runs
Maharashtra Cricket Association Stadium, Pune
Umpires: Anil Chaudhary (Ind) and Nitin Menon (Ind)
Player of the match: Sam Curran (Eng)

- England won the toss and elected to field.
- World Cup Super League points: India 10, England 0.
