= New Zealand cricket team in England in 2021 =

International cricket tour

	England	New Zealand
- Dates: 2 – 14 June 2021
Captains	Joe Root	Kane Williamson (Note: Tom Latham captained New Zealand for the 2nd Test.)

Test series
- Result: New Zealand won the 2-match series 1–0
Most runs	Rory Burns (238)	Devon Conway (306)
Most wickets	Ollie Robinson (7)	Tim Southee (7); Neil Wagner (7)
- Player of the series: Rory Burns (Eng) and Devon Conway (NZ)

The New Zealand cricket team toured England in June 2021 to play two Test matches against the England cricket team. In April 2021, New Zealand named their squad for the two-match series, with the same team also being named for the 2021 ICC World Test Championship Final, which was also played in England later in June 2021. The following month, England named their Test squad, with several players rested following their participation in the 2021 Indian Premier League.

The first Test ended in a draw, after no play was possible on the third day due to rain. Devon Conway, on his Test debut for New Zealand, scored 200 runs in the first innings. In the second Test, James Anderson played in his 162nd match, becoming the most capped player for England in Test cricket. New Zealand won the second Test by eight wickets to win the series 1–0. It was the first time that New Zealand had won a Test series in England since 1999, and it was also England's first Test series defeat at home since losing to Sri Lanka in 2014.

== Squads ==
The England squad left out Jos Buttler, Chris Woakes, Sam Curran, Moeen Ali and Jonny Bairstow, rested after their participation in the 2021 Indian Premier League. Also missing were Jofra Archer, out with an elbow injury, and Ben Stokes, with a broken finger. Jack Leach was the only spinner to be selected, with Dom Bess being left out of the squad. Ollie Robinson and James Bracey were both included, with neither of them capped at Test level. Ahead of the series, Ben Foakes was ruled out of England's squad after suffering a hamstring injury. As a result of Foakes being ruled out of the series, Sam Billings and Haseeb Hameed were both added to England's squad. With Ben Stokes being unavailable for the series, Stuart Broad was named as the vice-captain for England.

Ollie Robinson made his debut for England in the first Test match of the series. On the day of his international debut, Robinson had to make an apology for making racist and sexist tweets in 2012 and 2013. On 6 June 2021, Robinson was removed from the England squad for the second Test match of the series, and suspended from all formats of international cricket by the England and Wales Cricket Board (ECB). Dom Bess was added to England's squad for the second Test.

Kane Williamson was ruled out of New Zealand's squad for the second Test due to an elbow injury. As a result, Tom Latham was named as New Zealand's captain for the match. Mitchell Santner was also ruled out of New Zealand's squad for the second Test due to a finger injury, and BJ Watling was additionally ruled out due to a back injury.

Tests
England	New Zealand
Joe Root (c); Stuart Broad (vc); James Anderson; Dom Bess; Sam Billings; James Bracey (wk); Rory Burns; Zak Crawley; ~~Ben Foakes (wk)~~; Haseeb Hameed; Dan Lawrence; Jack Leach; Craig Overton; Ollie Pope; Ollie Robinson; Dom Sibley; Olly Stone; Mark Wood	Kane Williamson (c); Tom Latham (vc); Tom Blundell; Trent Boult; Doug Bracewell; Devon Conway; Colin de Grandhomme; Jacob Duffy; Matt Henry; Kyle Jamieson; Daryl Mitchell; Henry Nicholls; Ajaz Patel; Rachin Ravindra; Mitchell Santner; Tim Southee; Ross Taylor; Neil Wagner; BJ Watling (wk); Will Young

== Tour match ==
Ahead of the Test series, New Zealand were scheduled to play a tour match against Somerset. However, due to the COVID-19 pandemic, New Zealand would play a two-day intra-squad match instead. Tom Latham and Kane Williamson were named as the captains of each side. On 17 May 2021, the majority of New Zealand's squad arrived in England.

27–28 May 2021
Scorecard

Latham XI	v	Williamson XI
289/6d Devon Conway 55*; Neil Wagner 2/18 (15 overs)		294/5; Daryl Mitchell 64*; Kyle Jamieson 2/30 (14 overs)

Match drawn
Rose Bowl, Southampton

- Latham XI won the toss and elected to bat.

== Test series ==
=== 1st Test ===
2–6 June 2021
Scorecard

New Zealand	v	England
378 (122.4 overs); Devon Conway 200 (347); Ollie Robinson 4/75 (28 overs)		275 (101.1 overs); Rory Burns 132 (297); Tim Southee 6/43 (25.1 overs)
169/6d (52.3 overs); Tom Latham 36 (99); Ollie Robinson 3/26 (14 overs)		170/3 (70 overs); Dom Sibley 60* (207); Neil Wagner 2/27 (16 overs)

Match drawn
Lord's, London
Umpires: Michael Gough (Eng) and Richard Kettleborough (Eng)
Player of the match: Devon Conway (NZ)

- New Zealand won the toss and elected to bat.
- No play was possible on day 3 due to rain.
- James Bracey, Ollie Robinson (Eng) and Devon Conway (NZ) all made their Test debuts.
- Devon Conway became the 12th batsman for New Zealand to score a century on his Test debut.
- Devon Conway also became the second batsman for New Zealand, and seventh overall, to score a double century on his Test debut.

=== 2nd Test ===
10–14 June 2021 (Note: While five days of play were scheduled for each Test, the second Test reached a result in four days.)
Scorecard

England	v	New Zealand
303 (101 overs); Dan Lawrence 81* (124); Trent Boult 4/85 (29 overs)		388 (119.1 overs); Will Young 82 (204); Stuart Broad 4/48 (23.1 overs)
122 (41.1 overs); Mark Wood 29 (38); Neil Wagner 3/18 (10 overs)		41/2 (10.5 overs); Tom Latham 23* (32); Olly Stone 1/5 (1 over)

New Zealand won by 8 wickets
Edgbaston, Birmingham
Umpires: Richard Illingworth (Eng) and Richard Kettleborough (Eng)
Player of the match: Matt Henry (NZ)

- England won the toss and elected to bat.
- Tom Latham (NZ) scored his 4,000th run in Tests.
