= Indian cricket team in England in 2021 =

International cricket tour

	England	India
- Dates: 4 August – 14 September 2021
Captains	Joe Root (Note: Root stepped down as England captain prior to the rescheduled fifth Test; Ben Stokes was named as his replacement.)	Virat Kohli (Note: Kohli stepped down as India captain prior to the rescheduled fifth Test; Rohit Sharma was originally named as his replacement, but he was ruled out of the match with COVID-19 and replaced by Jasprit Bumrah.)

Test series
- Result: 5-match series drawn 2–2
Most runs	Joe Root (737)	Rohit Sharma (368)
Most wickets	Ollie Robinson (21)	Jasprit Bumrah (23)
- Player of the series: Joe Root (Eng); Jasprit Bumrah (Ind)

The Indian cricket team toured England in August and September 2021 to play five Test matches. Prior to their matches against England, India played New Zealand in the 2021 ICC World Test Championship Final at the Rose Bowl in Southampton in June 2021. The Test series were the first matches of the 2021–2023 ICC World Test Championship.

In May 2021, the Board of Control for Cricket in India (BCCI) made a request to the England and Wales Cricket Board (ECB) to adjust the schedule of the tour to accommodate the remaining matches of the 2021 Indian Premier League. However, a change would impact on tickets that have already been sold and the need to reschedule matches in The Hundred. On the second day of the third Test, England players wore black armbands in remembrance of former England cricketer Ted Dexter, who died on 25 August 2021. Likewise, on the first day of the fourth Test, Indian players wore black armbands in remembrance of former Indian cricketer Vasoo Paranjape, who died on 30 August 2021.

The first Test of the series ended in a draw, after more than two days of play was lost across the duration of the match to rain. India won the second Test by 151 runs, in the final hour of the fifth day, to take a 1–0 lead in the series. England won the third Test by an innings and 76 runs before the lunch break on day four, levelling the series 1–1. It was Joe Root's 27th win as captain, the most by a captain of England in Test cricket. India won the fourth Test by 157 runs, to lead the series 2–1 with one match to play.

On the morning of the scheduled start of the fifth Test of the series, both cricket boards confirmed that the match would not start on 10 September 2021, following positive COVID-19 results in the Indian team. The ECB then issued a statement to say that the Test match had been cancelled, as India were unable to field a side. Clarification on the result of the series was sent to the International Cricket Council (ICC), and the match referee Chris Broad. The BCCI issued a statement saying that they were working with the ECB with the aim to reschedule the match. In September 2021, the ECB announced that India would play a one-off Test match in 2022, ahead of India's limited-overs matches against England. The following month, the ECB confirmed that the rescheduled match would determine the outcome of the Test series. After being set a target of 378 runs, England won the fifth Test by seven wickets to record their highest successful run chase in a Test match, with the five-match series being drawn 2–2.

== Squads ==
1st–4th Tests (2021)		5th Test (2022)	
England	India	England	India
Joe Root (c); Moeen Ali (vc); James Anderson; Jonny Bairstow (wk); ~~Dom Bess~~; ~~Sam Billings (wk)~~; Stuart Broad; Rory Burns; Jos Buttler (wk); Zak Crawley; Sam Curran; Haseeb Hameed; Dan Lawrence; Jack Leach; ~~Saqib Mahmood~~; Dawid Malan; Craig Overton; Ollie Pope; Ollie Robinson; Dom Sibley; ~~Ben Stokes~~; Chris Woakes; Mark Wood	Virat Kohli (c); Ajinkya Rahane (vc); Mayank Agarwal; Ravichandran Ashwin; K. S. Bharat (wk); Jasprit Bumrah; Abhimanyu Easwaran; ~~Shubman Gill~~; Ravindra Jadeja; Prasidh Krishna; Rishabh Pant (wk); Axar Patel; Cheteshwar Pujara; KL Rahul; Wriddhiman Saha (wk); Mohammed Shami; Ishant Sharma; Rohit Sharma; Prithvi Shaw; Mohammed Siraj; ~~Washington Sundar~~; Shardul Thakur; Hanuma Vihari; Suryakumar Yadav; Umesh Yadav	Ben Stokes (c); James Anderson; Jonny Bairstow (wk); Sam Billings (wk); Stuart Broad; Harry Brook; Zak Crawley; ~~Ben Foakes (wk)~~; Jack Leach; Alex Lees; Craig Overton; Jamie Overton; Matty Potts; Ollie Pope; Joe Root	Jasprit Bumrah (c); Rishabh Pant (vc, wk); ~~Rohit Sharma (c)~~; ~~KL Rahul (vc)~~; Mayank Agarwal; Ravichandran Ashwin; K. S. Bharat (wk); Shubman Gill; Shreyas Iyer; Ravindra Jadeja; Virat Kohli; Prasidh Krishna; Cheteshwar Pujara; Mohammed Shami; Mohammed Siraj; Shardul Thakur; Hanuma Vihari; Umesh Yadav

India also named Abhimanyu Easwaran, Prasidh Krishna, Avesh Khan, and Arzan Nagwaswalla as standby players. In May 2021, K. S. Bharat was added to India's squad as cover for Wriddhiman Saha. On 6 July 2021, the BCCI requested that Shubman Gill returned to India after suffering with a stress injury. Prior to the warm-up matches, Rishabh Pant tested positive for COVID-19, and did not travel with the Indian squad to Durham, with Pant remaining in quarantine. After Pant's positive test, four more of India's contingent also tested positive and were quarantined in London for ten days. On 21 July 2021, the ECB announced the 17 member squad for the first two Test matches. On 22 July 2021, Avesh Khan and Washington Sundar were both ruled out of India's squad due to injury. On 25 July 2021, Prithvi Shaw and Suryakumar Yadav were announced as replacements for Gill, Khan, and Sundar. Abhimanyu Easwaran was also added to India's main squad from the group of reserve players. Mayank Agarwal was ruled out of India's squad for the first Test after suffering a concussion during a training session. Prasidh Krishna, one of India's standby players, was added to the main squad for the fourth Test match.

On 30 July 2021, England's Ben Stokes announced that he would be taking an "indefinite break" from all cricket with immediate effect. Craig Overton was added to England's squad as his replacement. Ahead of the second Test, Moeen Ali was added to England's squad. Saqib Mahmood was also added to England's squad for the second Test, as cover for James Anderson and Stuart Broad. Stuart Broad was later ruled out of the rest of the series after suffering a tear to his right calf. Dom Bess and Ollie Pope were both released from England's squad, allowing them to play in the 2021 Royal London One-Day Cup. Dawid Malan was added to England's squad for the third Test, replacing Dom Sibley. Ollie Pope was recalled to the squad for the match, with Zak Crawley being released. Jack Leach was not included in England's squad, but remained on standby for Moeen Ali. Mark Wood was ruled out of England's squad for the third Test after suffering a shoulder injury in the previous match. Wood and Chris Woakes were recalled to England's squad for the fourth Test. Jos Buttler missed the match due the birth of his second child, with Jonny Bairstow keeping wicket, Sam Billings added as wicket-keeper cover. Moeen Ali was also named as the vice-captain for the match. Saqib Mahmood was released from the squad, allowing him to play in the 2021 County Championship for Lancashire. Billings was released from England's squad during the fourth Test, to play in the 2021 County Championship for Kent. Jos Buttler and Jack Leach were both recalled for the fifth Test.

In January 2022, following India's third Test match against South Africa, Virat Kohli announced that he had stepped down as India's captain in Test cricket. On 22 May 2022, the BCCI named their squad for the rescheduled match against England, with Rohit Sharma leading the Test side. In June 2022, Mayank Agarwal was added to India's squad for the fifth Test, after Rohit Sharma tested positive for COVID-19. On 29 June 2022, Rohit Sharma again tested positive for COVID-19, with him undertaking two further tests to confirm his availability for the fifth Test. KL Rahul was ruled out of India's squad for the fifth Test after undergoing surgery for a hernia. Sharma was ruled out of the match, with Jasprit Bumrah named as India's captain and Rishabh Pant as the team's vice-captain.

On 27 June 2022, shortly after the conclusion of the series against New Zealand, England confirmed their squad for the fifth Test. Ben Foakes was ruled out of the match after failing to recover from COVID-19.

== Warm-up match ==
Ahead of the Test series, India were scheduled to play two intra-squad warm-up matches against India A. However, due to the COVID-19 pandemic, the England and Wales Cricket Board (ECB) confirmed that India would play two intra-squad four-day matches instead, with India travelling with a larger squad. Two first-class matches were planned against county teams, but were initially replaced with intra-squad matches in Durham. On 14 July 2021, both cricket boards agreed to a three-day match against a County Select XI side as part of India's preparation for the Test series. Will Rhodes of Warwickshire was named as the captain of the County Select XI team.

20–22 July 2021
Scorecard

India	v	County Select XI
311 (93 overs); KL Rahul 101 (150); Craig Miles 4/45 (17.1 overs)		220 (82.3 overs); Haseeb Hameed 112 (246); Umesh Yadav 3/22 (15 overs)
192/3d (55 overs); Ravindra Jadeja 51 (77); Jack Carson 2/64 (22 overs)		31/0 (15.5 overs); Jake Libby 17* (48)

Match drawn
Riverside Ground, Chester-le-Street
Umpires: Hassan Adnan (Eng) and Paul Pollard (Eng)

- India won the toss and elected to bat.
- James Rew (County Select XI) made his first-class debut.

== Test series ==
=== 1st Test ===
4–8 August 2021
Scorecard

England	v	India
183 (65.4 overs); Joe Root 64 (108); Jasprit Bumrah 4/46 (20.4 overs)		278 (84.5 overs); KL Rahul 84 (214); Ollie Robinson 5/85 (26.5 overs)
303 (85.5 overs); Joe Root 109 (172); Jasprit Bumrah 5/64 (19 overs)		52/1 (14 overs); KL Rahul 26 (38); Stuart Broad 1/18 (5 overs)

Match drawn
Trent Bridge, Nottingham
Umpires: Michael Gough (Eng) and Richard Kettleborough (Eng)
Player of the match: Joe Root (Eng)

- England won the toss and elected to bat.
- 56.2 overs and 46.5 overs of play were lost on days 2 and 3 respectively due to rain.
- No play was possible on day 5 due to rain.
- Joe Root surpassed Alastair Cook to become England's highest run-scorer in international cricket.
- James Anderson (Eng) became the third-highest wicket-taker in Tests, taking his 620th dismissal.
- Ollie Robinson (Eng) took his first five-wicket haul in Tests.
- Batting during India's first innings, Ravindra Jadeja became the fifth Indian and fifth-fastest player to score 2,000 runs and take 200 wickets in Tests.
- World Test Championship points: England 2, India 2. (Note: Both teams were deducted two WTC points for bowling a slow over-rate.)

=== 2nd Test ===
12–16 August 2021
Scorecard

India	v	England
364 (126.1 overs); KL Rahul 129 (250); James Anderson 5/62 (29 overs)		391 (128 overs); Joe Root 180* (321); Mohammed Siraj 4/94 (30 overs)
298/8d (109.3 overs); Ajinkya Rahane 61 (146); Mark Wood 3/51 (18 overs)		120 (51.5 overs); Joe Root 33 (60); Mohammed Siraj 4/32 (10.5 overs)

India won by 151 runs
Lord's, London
Umpires: Michael Gough (Eng) and Richard Illingworth (Eng)
Player of the match: KL Rahul (Ind)

- England won the toss and elected to field.
- Joe Root became the second batsman for England to score 9,000 runs in Tests.
- World Test Championship points: India 12, England 0.

=== 3rd Test ===
25–29 August 2021 (Note: While five days of play were scheduled for each Test, the third Test reached a result in four days.)
Scorecard

India	v	England
78 (40.4 overs); Rohit Sharma 19 (105); James Anderson 3/6 (8 overs)		432 (132.2 overs); Joe Root 121 (165); Mohammed Shami 4/95 (28 overs)
278 (99.3 overs); Cheteshwar Pujara 91 (189); Ollie Robinson 5/65 (26 overs)

England won by an innings and 76 runs
Headingley Cricket Ground, Leeds
Umpires: Richard Kettleborough (Eng) and Alex Wharf (Eng)
Player of the match: Ollie Robinson (Eng)

- India won the toss and elected to bat.
- Alex Wharf (Eng) stood in his first Test as an umpire.
- India's total in the first innings was their lowest-ever in their first innings away from home in Tests.
- James Anderson (Eng) took his 400th wicket at home in Tests.
- World Test Championship points: England 12, India 0.

=== 4th Test ===
2–6 September 2021
Scorecard

India	v	England
191 (61.3 overs); Shardul Thakur 57 (36); Chris Woakes 4/55 (15 overs)		290 (84 overs); Ollie Pope 81 (159); Umesh Yadav 3/76 (19 overs)
466 (148.2 overs); Rohit Sharma 127 (256); Chris Woakes 3/83 (32 overs)		210 (92.2 overs); Haseeb Hameed 63 (193); Umesh Yadav 3/60 (18.2 overs)

India won by 157 runs
The Oval, London
Umpires: Richard Illingworth (Eng) and Alex Wharf (Eng)
Player of the match: Rohit Sharma (Ind)

- England won the toss and elected to field.
- Virat Kohli (Ind) became the fastest batsman, in terms of innings, to score 23,000 runs in international cricket (490).
- Umesh Yadav (Ind) took his 150th wicket in Tests.
- Virat Kohli (Ind) scored his 10,000th run in first-class cricket.
- Rohit Sharma (Ind) scored his 15,000th run in international cricket.
- Jasprit Bumrah (Ind) took his 100th wicket in Tests.
- World Test Championship points: India 12, England 0.

=== 5th Test ===
1–5 July 2022 (Note: The match was originally scheduled to be played from 10 to 14 September 2021 at Old Trafford, but was rescheduled due to COVID-19 cases in the Indian camp.)
Scorecard

India	v	England
416 (84.5 overs); Rishabh Pant 146 (111); James Anderson 5/60 (21.5 overs)		284 (61.3 overs); Jonny Bairstow 106 (140); Mohammed Siraj 4/66 (11.3 overs)
245 (81.5 overs); Cheteshwar Pujara 66 (168); Ben Stokes 4/33 (11.5 overs)		378/3 (76.4 overs); Joe Root 142* (173); Jasprit Bumrah 2/74 (17 overs)

England won by 7 wickets
Edgbaston Cricket Ground, Birmingham
Umpires: Aleem Dar (Pak) and Richard Kettleborough (Eng)
Player of the match: Jonny Bairstow (Eng)

- England won the toss and elected to field.
- Only 38.5 overs of play was possible on day 2 due to rain.
- The match was cancelled in September 2021 following COVID-19 cases in the Indian camp, and was rescheduled to be played before India's white-ball series against England in July 2022.
- Jasprit Bumrah captained India for the first time in Tests.
- Stuart Broad (Eng) took his 550th wicket in Tests.
- Jasprit Bumrah (Ind) scored 35 runs in one over off the bowling of Stuart Broad, with 29 runs coming from the bat, the most runs off one over in Tests.
- This was England's highest successful run chase in Tests.
- World Test Championship points: England 12, India −2. (Note: India were deducted two WTC points for a slow over-rate while bowling.)
