= English cricket team in New Zealand in 2019–20 =

International cricket tour

	New Zealand	England
- Dates: 27 October – 3 December 2019
Captains	Kane Williamson (Tests); Tim Southee (T20Is)	Joe Root (Tests); Eoin Morgan (T20Is)

Test series
- Result: New Zealand won the 2-match series 1–0
Most runs	BJ Watling (260)	Joe Root (239)
Most wickets	Neil Wagner (13)	Sam Curran (6)
- Player of the series: Neil Wagner (NZ)

Twenty20 International series
- Results: England won the 5-match series 3–2
Most runs	Martin Guptill (153)	Dawid Malan (208)
Most wickets	Mitchell Santner (11)	Chris Jordan (7)
- Player of the series: Mitchell Santner (NZ)

The England cricket team toured New Zealand between October and December 2019 to play two Tests and five Twenty20 International (T20I) matches. New Zealand Cricket confirmed the fixtures for the tour in June 2019. The Bay Oval hosted its first ever Test match, becoming the ninth Test venue in the country.

The Test matches were not part of the 2019–21 ICC World Test Championship (WTC), as the tour was confirmed prior to the formation of the WTC. Ashley Giles, the managing director of England men's cricket, suggested that the tour could have a stand-in captain and coach. However, when the squads were announced in September 2019, Joe Root and Eoin Morgan were retained as the captains of England's Test and T20I teams respectively, but Jonny Bairstow was dropped from the Test squad. Sam Billings was named as the vice-captain of England's T20I squad. In November 2019, Bairstow was added to England's Test squad, as cover for Joe Denly.

Kane Williamson was ruled out of T20I series due to a hip injury, with Tim Southee named as New Zealand's captain. New Zealand's Trent Boult was rested for the first three T20Is, in order to focus on his Test preparations.

The final T20I finished in a tie, with the match decided by a Super Over. England won the Super Over to win the T20I series 3–2. In the Test series, New Zealand won the first match by an innings and 65 runs. This stretched New Zealand's unbeaten run at home in Tests to ten matches, going back to March 2017, which includes wins in seven of those fixtures. New Zealand won the two-match Test series 1–0, after the second Test was drawn.

== Squads ==
Tests		T20Is	
New Zealand	England	New Zealand	England
Kane Williamson (c); Tom Latham (vc); Todd Astle; Tom Blundell; Trent Boult; Colin de Grandhomme; Lockie Ferguson; Matt Henry; Daryl Mitchell; Henry Nicholls; Jeet Raval; Mitchell Santner; Tim Southee; Ross Taylor; Neil Wagner; BJ Watling (wk)	Joe Root (c); Ben Stokes (vc); Jofra Archer; Jonny Bairstow; Stuart Broad; Rory Burns; Jos Buttler (wk); Zak Crawley; Sam Curran; Joe Denly; Jack Leach; Saqib Mahmood; Matthew Parkinson; Ollie Pope; Dom Sibley; Chris Woakes	Tim Southee (c); Trent Boult; Colin de Grandhomme; Lockie Ferguson; Martin Guptill; Scott Kuggeleijn; Daryl Mitchell; Colin Munro; James Neesham; Mitchell Santner; Tim Seifert (wk); Ish Sodhi; Ross Taylor; Blair Tickner	Eoin Morgan (c); Sam Billings (vc, wk); Jonny Bairstow; Tom Banton; Pat Brown; Sam Curran; Tom Curran; Joe Denly; Lewis Gregory; Chris Jordan; Saqib Mahmood; Dawid Malan; Matthew Parkinson; Adil Rashid; James Vince

In New Zealand's T20I squad, Lockie Ferguson was selected for the first three matches, and Trent Boult was selected for the last two matches. Ahead of the second T20I, Joe Denly was ruled out of England's squad for the rest of the T20I series due to an ankle injury. Jonny Bairstow was added to England's Test squad as cover for Denly. Ahead of the first Test, Lockie Ferguson and Todd Astle were released from the New Zealand squad to participate in the Ford Trophy. Ahead of the second Test, both Trent Boult and Colin de Grandhomme were ruled out of New Zealand's squad due to injury. Daryl Mitchell was called up as cover for de Grandhomme, with Lockie Ferguson and Todd Astle also rejoining the New Zealand squad for the second Test.

== Tour matches ==
=== 20-over match: New Zealand XI vs England ===
27 October 2019
13:00
Scorecard

New Zealand XI; 172/4 (20 overs)	v	England; 178/4 (18.1 overs)
Anton Devcich 62 (43); Adil Rashid 2/25 (4 overs)		Jonny Bairstow 78* (45); Lockie Ferguson 3/32 (4 overs)

England won by 6 wickets
Bert Sutcliffe Oval, Lincoln
Umpires: Shaun Haig (NZ) and Wayne Knights (NZ)

- England won the toss and elected to field.

=== 20-over match: New Zealand XI vs England ===
29 October 2019
13:00
Scorecard

England; 188/5 (20 overs)	v	New Zealand XI; 191/2 (18.3 overs)
James Vince 46 (32); Anurag Verma 3/46 (4 overs)		Colin Munro 107* (57); Saqib Mahmood 1/36 (3.3 overs)

New Zealand XI won by 8 wickets
Bert Sutcliffe Oval, Lincoln
Umpires: Kim Cotton (NZ) and Ashley Mehrotra (NZ)

- England won the toss and elected to bat.

=== Two-day match: New Zealand XI vs England ===
12–13 November 2019
Scorecard

England	v	New Zealand XI
376/5d (87 overs); Zak Crawley 103 (137); Henry Shipley 1/81 (16 overs)		285/5 (75 overs); Finn Allen 104 (130); Jofra Archer 2/46 (11 overs)

Match drawn
Cobham Oval, Whangārei
Umpires: Eugene Sanders (NZ) and Garth Stirrat (NZ)

- England won the toss and elected to bat.

=== Three-day match: New Zealand A vs England ===
15–17 November 2019
Scorecard

New Zealand A	v	England
302/6d (84 overs); Glenn Phillips 116 (219); Jofra Archer 2/58 (17 overs)		405 (117.5 overs); Jos Buttler 110 (153); Scott Kuggeleijn 3/46 (13.5 overs)
169/8 (68 overs); Glenn Phillips 36 (57); Jofra Archer 3/34 (14 overs)

Match drawn
Cobham Oval, Whangārei
Umpires: Chris Brown (NZ) and Wayne Knights (NZ)

- New Zealand A won the toss and elected to bat.
- Hamish Rutherford (New Zealand A) was replaced by Scott Kuggeleijn on Day 2.

== T20I series ==
=== 1st T20I ===
1 November 2019
14:00
Scorecard

New Zealand; 153/5 (20 overs)	v	England; 154/3 (18.3 overs)
Ross Taylor 44 (35); Chris Jordan 2/28 (4 overs)		James Vince 59 (38); Mitchell Santner 3/23 (4 overs)

England won by 7 wickets
Hagley Oval, Christchurch
Umpires: Shaun Haig (NZ) and Wayne Knights (NZ)
Player of the match: James Vince (Eng)

- England won the toss and elected to field.
- Pat Brown, Sam Curran and Lewis Gregory (Eng) all made their T20I debuts.
- This was the first T20I match to be played at this ground.

=== 2nd T20I ===
3 November 2019
14:00
Scorecard

New Zealand; 176/8 (20 overs)	v	England; 155 (19.5 overs)
James Neesham 42 (22); Chris Jordan 3/23 (4 overs)		Dawid Malan 39 (29); Mitchell Santner 3/25 (4 overs)

New Zealand won by 21 runs
Westpac Stadium, Wellington
Umpires: Shaun Haig (NZ) and Wayne Knights (NZ)
Player of the match: Mitchell Santner (NZ)

- England won the toss and elected to field.
- Saqib Mahmood (Eng) made his T20I debut.
- Lewis Gregory became the second bowler for England to take a wicket with his first delivery in T20Is.

=== 3rd T20I ===
5 November 2019
14:00
Scorecard

New Zealand; 180/7 (20 overs)	v	England; 166/7 (20 overs)
Colin de Grandhomme 55 (35); Tom Curran 2/29 (4 overs)		Dawid Malan 55 (34); Lockie Ferguson 2/25 (4 overs); Blair Tickner 2/25 (4 overs)

New Zealand won by 14 runs
Saxton Oval, Nelson
Umpires: Chris Brown (NZ) and Wayne Knights (NZ)
Player of the match: Colin de Grandhomme (NZ)

- New Zealand won the toss and elected to bat.
- Tom Banton and Matt Parkinson (Eng) both made their T20I debuts.

=== 4th T20I ===
8 November 2019
18:00 (N)
Scorecard

England; 241/3 (20 overs)	v	New Zealand; 165 (16.5 overs)
Dawid Malan 103* (51); Mitchell Santner 2/32 (4 overs)		Tim Southee 39 (15); Matt Parkinson 4/47 (4 overs)

England won by 76 runs
McLean Park, Napier
Umpires: Chris Gaffaney (NZ) and Shaun Haig (NZ)
Player of the match: Dawid Malan (Eng)

- New Zealand won the toss and elected to field.
- Dawid Malan scored his first century, and the fastest by an England batsman in T20Is (48 balls).
- This was England's highest total in T20Is.

=== 5th T20I ===
10 November 2019
14:00
Scorecard

New Zealand; 146/5 (11 overs)	v	England; 146/7 (11 overs)
Martin Guptill 50 (20); Saqib Mahmood 1/20 (2 overs)		Jonny Bairstow 47 (18); Mitchell Santner 2/20 (2 overs)

Match tied
(England won the Super Over)
Eden Park No. 1, Auckland
Umpires: Chris Gaffaney (NZ) and Wayne Knights (NZ)
Player of the match: Jonny Bairstow (Eng)

- England won the toss and elected to field.
- The match was reduced to 11 overs per side due to rain.

== Test series ==
=== 1st Test ===
21–25 November 2019
Scorecard

England	v	New Zealand
353 (124 overs); Ben Stokes 91 (146); Tim Southee 4/88 (32 overs)		615/9d (201 overs); BJ Watling 205 (473); Sam Curran 3/119 (35 overs)
197 (96.2 overs); Joe Denly 35 (142); Neil Wagner 5/44 (19.2 overs)

New Zealand won by an innings and 65 runs
Bay Oval, Mount Maunganui
Umpires: Kumar Dharmasena (SL) and Bruce Oxenford (Aus)
Player of the match: BJ Watling (NZ)

- England won the toss and elected to bat.
- Dom Sibley (Eng) made his Test debut.
- This was the first Test match to be played at this ground.
- BJ Watling became the first wicketkeeper-batsman for New Zealand to score a double century in Tests.
- Mitchell Santner (NZ) scored his maiden century in Tests.

=== 2nd Test ===
29 November – 3 December 2019
Scorecard

New Zealand	v	England
375 (129.1 overs); Tom Latham 105 (172); Stuart Broad 4/73 (28 overs)		476 (162.5 overs); Joe Root 226 (441); Neil Wagner 5/124 (35.5 overs)
241/2 (75 overs); Ross Taylor 105* (186); Chris Woakes 1/12 (11 overs)

Match drawn
Seddon Park, Hamilton
Umpires: Kumar Dharmasena (SL) and Paul Wilson (Aus)
Player of the match: Joe Root (Eng)

- England won the toss and elected to field.
- Only 3 balls were bowled after Tea on Day 1.
- Daryl Mitchell (NZ) and Zak Crawley (Eng) both made their Test debuts.
- Joe Root scored his first double century as captain of England, and became the first visiting captain to score a double century in New Zealand in Tests.
- Ross Taylor became the second batsman for New Zealand to score 7,000 runs in Tests.
