= English cricket team in South Africa in 2019–20 =

International cricket tour

| | South Africa | England |
- Dates: 17 December 2019 – 16 February 2020
| Captains | Faf du Plessis (Tests); Quinton de Kock (ODIs & T20Is) | Joe Root (Tests); Eoin Morgan (ODIs & T20Is) |

Test series
- Result: England won the 4-match series 3–1
| Most runs | Quinton de Kock (380) | Dom Sibley (324) |
| Most wickets | Anrich Nortje (18) | Stuart Broad (14) |
- Player of the series: Ben Stokes (Eng)

One Day International series
- Results: 3-match series drawn 1–1
| Most runs | Quinton de Kock (187) | Joe Denly (153) |
| Most wickets | Beuran Hendricks (4); Tabraiz Shamsi (4) | Adil Rashid (3) |
- Player of the series: Quinton de Kock (SA)

Twenty20 International series
- Results: England won the 3-match series 2–1
| Most runs | Quinton de Kock (131) | Eoin Morgan (136) |
| Most wickets | Lungi Ngidi (8) | Tom Curran (5) |
- Player of the series: Eoin Morgan (Eng)

The England cricket team toured South Africa from December 2019 to February 2020 to play four Tests, three One Day Internationals (ODIs) and three Twenty20 International (T20I) matches. The Test series formed part of the inaugural 2019–2021 ICC World Test Championship. Cricket South Africa confirmed the fixtures for the tour in May 2019.

In September 2019, Cricket South Africa raised concerns about hosting the New Year's Test match at the Newlands Cricket Ground, with regard to financial issues around Western Province Cricket Association's affairs. The following month, Cricket South Africa confirmed that the venue would host the Test match as planned. Ahead of the Test series, South Africa's Vernon Philander announced that the series would be his last before retiring from international cricket. In the first Test, England's James Anderson became the ninth cricketer to play in 150 Test matches. The third Test of the series was England's 500th to be played overseas. England won the Test series 3–1, the first time that the England cricket team had won three Tests on a tour to South Africa since 1913–14. South Africa became the first team to be deducted World Test Championship points, after a slow over-rate in the fourth Test.

For the One Day International series, Cricket South Africa appointed Quinton de Kock as the new captain of their ODI team, replacing Faf du Plessis. Du Plessis was also dropped from the ODI squad. Quinton de Kock was also named as South Africa's captain for the T20I series. The ODI series was drawn 1–1, after the second match was washed out. England won the T20I series 2–1. The 1,207 runs scored in the T20Is broke the record for the most runs scored in a three-match T20I series. The day after the final T20I match, Faf du Plessis announced that he had stepped down as the captain of South Africa's Test and T20I sides.

== Squads ==
| Tests | | ODIs | | T20Is | |
| South Africa | England | South Africa | England | South Africa | England |
|---|---|---|---|---|---|
| Faf du Plessis (c); Temba Bavuma; Quinton de Kock (wk); Dean Elgar; Zubayr Hamza; Beuran Hendricks; Keshav Maharaj; Pieter Malan; Aiden Markram; Anrich Nortje; Dane Paterson; Keegan Petersen; Andile Phehlukwayo; Vernon Philander; Dwaine Pretorius; Kagiso Rabada; Rudi Second; Rassie van der Dussen | Joe Root (c); Ben Stokes (vc); James Anderson; Jofra Archer; Jonny Bairstow; Dom Bess; Stuart Broad; Rory Burns; Jos Buttler (wk); Zak Crawley; Sam Curran; Joe Denly; Jack Leach; Craig Overton; Matthew Parkinson; Ollie Pope; Dominic Sibley; Chris Woakes; Mark Wood | Quinton de Kock (c, wk); Temba Bavuma; Bjorn Fortuin; Beuran Hendricks; Reeza Hendricks; ~~Sisanda Magala~~; Janneman Malan; David Miller; Lungi Ngidi; Andile Phehlukwayo; Tabraiz Shamsi; Lutho Sipamla; JJ Smuts; Rassie van der Dussen; Kyle Verreynne | Eoin Morgan (c); Moeen Ali; Jonny Bairstow; Tom Banton; ~~Pat Brown~~; Sam Curran; Tom Curran; Joe Denly; Chris Jordan; Saqib Mahmood; Dawid Malan; Matthew Parkinson; Adil Rashid; Joe Root; Jason Roy; Chris Woakes | Quinton de Kock (c, wk); Temba Bavuma; Bjorn Fortuin; Beuran Hendricks; Reeza Hendricks; Heinrich Klaasen; Sisanda Magala; David Miller; Lungi Ngidi; Andile Phehlukwayo; Dwaine Pretorius; Tabraiz Shamsi; JJ Smuts; Dale Steyn; Pite van Biljon; Rassie van der Dussen | Eoin Morgan (c); Moeen Ali; ~~Jofra Archer~~; Jonny Bairstow; Jos Buttler; ~~Pat Brown~~; Sam Curran; Tom Curran; Joe Denly; Chris Jordan; Saqib Mahmood; Dawid Malan; Matthew Parkinson; Adil Rashid; Jason Roy; Ben Stokes; Mark Wood |

Ahead of the first Test match, several members of the England cricket team became ill with flu-like symptoms. As a result, Dom Bess and Craig Overton were called up to England's squad as cover. During the first Test, South Africa's Aiden Markram fractured his finger ruling him out of the rest of the series. Keegan Petersen was named as Markram's replacement in South Africa's Test squad. Prior to the second Test, Rory Burns suffered an ankle injury playing football and was ruled out of England's squad for the rest of the series. In January 2020, Pat Brown was ruled out of England's ODI and T20I squads, following a stress fracture to his lower back. England's James Anderson suffered a rib injury on the final day of the second Test, and was ruled out of the rest of the series. Craig Overton remained in England's Test squad as cover for Anderson. Before the third Test, England's Jack Leach flew home after suffering from sepsis. South Africa's Kagiso Rabada was banned from the fourth Test, after breaching the ICC code of conduct for his celebration after dismissing Joe Root in the third Test. England's Jofra Archer picked up an elbow injury during the Test series that eventually ruled him out of playing in the T20I matches. Saqib Mahmood was named as Archer's replacement in England's T20I squad. Ahead of the ODI series, Sisanda Magala was declared not to be fully fit, and was ruled out of South Africa's squad.

== Tour matches ==
=== Two-day match: Cricket South Africa Invitation XI vs England ===
17–18 December 2019
Scorecard

| England | v | Cricket South Africa Invitation XI |
| 309/4d (90 overs); Joe Root 72* (86); Diego Rosier 1/15 (5 overs) | | 289 (68 overs); Jacques Snyman 79 (78); Chris Woakes 3/48 (11 overs) |

Match drawn
Willowmoore Park, Benoni
Umpires: Mazizi Gampu (SA) and Siphelele Gasa (SA)

- England won the toss and elected to bat.

=== Three-day match: South Africa A vs England ===
20–22 December 2019
Scorecard

| England | v | South Africa A |
| 456/7d (109.3 overs); Ollie Pope 132 (145); Andile Phehlukwayo 3/55 (15.3 overs) | | 325/5 (93.2 overs); Keegan Petersen 111 (240); James Anderson 3/41 (19 overs) |

Match drawn
Willowmoore Park, Benoni
Umpires: Stephen Harris (SA) and Brad White (SA)

- England won the toss and elected to bat.

=== One-day match: Cricket South Africa Invitation XI vs England ===
31 January 2020
10:00
Scorecard

| England; 240 (44.1 overs) | v | Cricket South Africa Invitation XI; 163 (38.4 overs) |
| Jason Roy 104 (99); Stefan Tait 2/32 (8 overs) | | Jacques Snyman 65 (67); Tom Curran 2/17 (6 overs) |

England won by 77 runs
Boland Park, Paarl
Umpires: Shaun George (SA) and Allahudien Paleker (SA)

- England won the toss and elected to bat.

=== One-day match: Cricket South Africa Invitation XI vs England ===
1 February 2020
10:00
Scorecard

| England; 346/7 (50 overs) | v | Cricket South Africa Invitation XI; 193/7 (30 overs) |
| Jonny Bairstow 100* (83); Stefan Tait 4/56 (10 overs) | | Jacques Snyman 67 (45); Matt Parkinson 3/9 (2 overs) |

Cricket South Africa Invitation XI won by 4 wickets (DLS method)
Boland Park, Paarl
Umpires: Shaun George (SA) and Allahudien Paleker (SA)

- England won the toss and elected to bat.
- The match was limited to 30 overs with Cricket South Africa Invitation XI's target adjusted to 188.

== Test series ==
=== 1st Test ===
26–30 December 2019 (Note: While five days of play were scheduled for each Test, the first and fourth Tests reached a result in four days.)
Scorecard

| South Africa | v | England |
| 284 (84.3 overs); Quinton de Kock 95 (128); Stuart Broad 4/58 (18.3 overs) | | 181 (53.2 overs); Joe Denly 50 (111); Vernon Philander 4/16 (14.2 overs) |
| 272 (61.4 overs); Rassie van der Dussen 51 (67); Jofra Archer 5/102 (17 overs) | | 268 (93 overs); Rory Burns 84 (154); Kagiso Rabada 4/103 (24 overs) |

South Africa won by 107 runs
Centurion Park, Centurion
Umpires: Chris Gaffaney (NZ) and Paul Reiffel (Aus)
Player of the match: Quinton de Kock (SA)

- England won the toss and elected to field.
- Dwaine Pretorius and Rassie van der Dussen (SA) both made their Test debuts.
- James Anderson (Eng) played in his 150th Test.
- World Test Championship points: South Africa 30, England 0.

=== 2nd Test ===
3–7 January 2020
Scorecard

| England | v | South Africa |
| 269 (91.5 overs); Ollie Pope 61* (144); Kagiso Rabada 3/68 (19.5 overs) | | 223 (89 overs); Dean Elgar 88 (180); James Anderson 5/40 (19 overs) |
| 391/8d (111 overs); Dom Sibley 133* (311); Anrich Nortje 3/61 (18 overs) | | 248 (137.4 overs); Pieter Malan 84 (288); Ben Stokes 3/35 (23.4 overs) |

England won by 189 runs
Newlands Cricket Ground, Cape Town
Umpires: Kumar Dharmasena (SL) and Paul Reiffel (Aus)
Player of the match: Ben Stokes (Eng)

- England won the toss and elected to bat.
- Pieter Malan (SA) made his Test debut.
- James Anderson took his 28th five-wicket haul to become the bowler with the most five-wicket hauls for England in Tests.
- Dom Sibley (Eng) scored his maiden Test century.
- This was England's first win in a Test match at this venue since 1957.
- World Test Championship points: England 30, South Africa 0.

=== 3rd Test ===
16–20 January 2020
Scorecard

| England | v | South Africa |
| 499/9d (152 overs); Ollie Pope 135* (226); Keshav Maharaj 5/180 (58 overs) | | 209 (86.4 overs); Quinton de Kock 63 (139); Dom Bess 5/51 (31 overs) |
| | | 237 (88.5 overs) (f/o); Keshav Maharaj 71 (106); Joe Root 4/87 (29 overs) |

England won by an innings and 53 runs
St. George's Park, Port Elizabeth
Umpires: Bruce Oxenford (Aus) and Rod Tucker (Aus)
Player of the match: Ollie Pope (Eng)

- England won the toss and elected to bat.
- Dane Paterson (SA) made his Test debut.
- This was England's 500th Test match to be played overseas.
- Ben Stokes (Eng) scored his 4,000th run in Tests.
- Ollie Pope (Eng) scored his maiden Test century.
- Dom Bess (Eng) took his maiden five-wicket haul in Tests.
- World Test Championship points: England 30, South Africa 0.

=== 4th Test ===
24–28 January 2020
Scorecard

| England | v | South Africa |
| 400 (98.2 overs); Zak Crawley 66 (112); Anrich Nortje 5/110 (24 overs) | | 183 (68.3 overs); Quinton de Kock 76 (116); Mark Wood 5/46 (14.3 overs) |
| 248 (61.3 overs); Joe Root 58 (96); Beuran Hendricks 5/64 (15.3 overs) | | 274 (77.1 overs); Rassie van der Dussen 98 (138); Mark Wood 4/54 (16.1 overs) |

England won by 191 runs
Wanderers Stadium, Johannesburg
Umpires: Rod Tucker (Aus) and Joel Wilson (WI)
Player of the match: Mark Wood (Eng)

- England won the toss and elected to bat.
- Beuran Hendricks (SA) made his Test debut, taking a five-wicket haul.
- Anrich Nortje (SA) took his maiden five-wicket haul in Tests.
- Quinton de Kock (SA) became the fastest wicket-keeper, in terms of matches, to complete 200 dismissals in Tests (47).
- World Test Championship points: England 30, South Africa –6. (Note: South Africa were deducted six WTC points for bowling a slow over-rate.)

== ODI series ==
=== 1st ODI ===
4 February 2020
13:00 (D/N)
Scorecard

| England; 258/8 (50 overs) | v | South Africa; 259/3 (47.4 overs) |
| Joe Denly 87 (103); Tabraiz Shamsi 3/38 (10 overs) | | Quinton de Kock 107 (113); Chris Jordan 1/31 (5 overs) |

South Africa won by 7 wickets
Newlands Cricket Ground, Cape Town
Umpires: Gregory Brathwaite (WI) and Shaun George (SA)
Player of the match: Quinton de Kock (SA)

- South Africa won the toss and elected to field.
- Lutho Sipamla, JJ Smuts (SA), Tom Banton and Matt Parkinson (Eng) all made their ODI debuts.
- Chris Woakes (Eng) played in his 100th ODI.
- Quinton de Kock (SA) scored his 5,000th run in ODIs.

=== 2nd ODI ===
7 February 2020
13:00 (D/N)
Scorecard

| South Africa; 71/2 (11.2 overs) | v | England |
| Reeza Hendricks 35* (34); Chris Jordan 1/0 (0.2 overs) |

No result
Kingsmead Cricket Ground, Durban
Umpires: Aleem Dar (Pak) and Allahudien Paleker (SA)

- England won the toss and elected to field.
- Rain during South Africa's innings prevented any further play.
- Bjorn Fortuin (SA) made his ODI debut.

=== 3rd ODI ===
9 February 2020
10:00
Scorecard

| South Africa; 256/7 (50 overs) | v | England; 257/8 (43.2 overs) |
| David Miller 69* (53); Adil Rashid 3/51 (10 overs) | | Joe Denly 66 (79); Beuran Hendricks 3/59 (10 overs) |

England won by 2 wickets
Wanderers Stadium, Johannesburg
Umpires: Gregory Brathwaite (WI) and Shaun George (SA)
Player of the match: Adil Rashid (Eng)

- England won the toss and elected to field.
- Saqib Mahmood (Eng) made his ODI debut.
- Adil Rashid (Eng) played in his 100th ODI.

== T20I series ==
=== 1st T20I ===
12 February 2020
18:00 (N)
Scorecard

| South Africa; 177/8 (20 overs) | v | England; 176/9 (20 overs) |
| Temba Bavuma 43 (27); Chris Jordan 2/28 (3 overs) | | Jason Roy 70 (38); Lungi Ngidi 3/30 (4 overs) |

South Africa won by 1 run
Buffalo Park, East London
Umpires: Adrian Holdstock (SA) and Bongani Jele (SA)
Player of the match: Lungi Ngidi (SA)

- England won the toss and elected to field.
- Dale Steyn took his 62nd wicket to become the leading wicket-taker for South Africa in T20Is.

=== 2nd T20I ===
14 February 2020
18:00 (N)
Scorecard

| England; 204/7 (20 overs) | v | South Africa; 202/7 (20 overs) |
| Ben Stokes 47* (30); Lungi Ngidi 3/48 (4 overs) | | Quinton de Kock 65 (22); Chris Jordan 2/31 (4 overs) |

England won by 2 runs
Kingsmead Cricket Ground, Durban
Umpires: Bongani Jele (SA) and Allahudien Paleker (SA)
Player of the match: Moeen Ali (Eng)

- South Africa won the toss and elected to field.
- Quinton de Kock scored the fastest fifty by a batsman for South Africa in T20Is (17 balls).

=== 3rd T20I ===
16 February 2020
14:30
Scorecard

| South Africa; 222/6 (20 overs) | v | England; 226/5 (19.1 overs) |
| Heinrich Klaasen 66 (33); Tom Curran 2/33 (4 overs) | | Jonny Bairstow 64 (34); Lungi Ngidi 2/55 (4 overs) |

England won by 5 wickets
Centurion Park, Centurion
Umpires: Adrian Holdstock (SA) and Allahudien Paleker (SA)
Player of the match: Eoin Morgan (Eng)

- South Africa won the toss and elected to bat.
- Eoin Morgan equalled his own record for the fastest fifty by a batsman for England in T20Is (21 balls).
