= Prasidh Krishna =

Indian cricketer (born 1996)

- Krishna playing for India in 2026

Personal information
- Full name: Muralikrishna Prasidh Krishna
- Born: 19 February 1996 (age 30); Bangalore, Karnataka, India
- Nickname: Skiddy
- Height: 6 ft 3 in (191 cm)
- Batting: Right-handed
- Bowling: Right-arm fast-medium
- Role: Bowler

International information
- National side: India (2021–present)
- Test debut (cap 309): 26 December 2023 v South Africa
- Last Test: 6 June 2026 v Afghanistan
- ODI debut (cap 234): 23 March 2021 v England
- Last ODI: 19 July 2026 v England
- ODI shirt no.: 24
- T20I debut (cap 106): 18 August 2023 v Ireland
- Last T20I: 11 July 2026 v England
- T20I shirt no.: 24

Domestic team information
- Years: Team
- 2015–present: Karnataka
- 2018–2021: Kolkata Knight Riders
- 2022: Rajasthan Royals
- 2025–present: Gujarat Titans

Career statistics
Competition	Test	ODI	T20I	FC
Matches	7	28	8	35
Runs scored	10	2	2	222
Batting average	2.00	0.66	–	7.92
100s/50s	0/0	0/0	0/0	0/0
Top score	5*	2*	1*	34
Balls bowled	1,044	1,352	186	5,529
Wickets	25	50	9	129
Bowling average	31.96	26.62	37.88	24.25
5 wickets in innings	0	1	0	4
10 wickets in match	0	0	0	1
Best bowling	4/62	5/23	3/41	6/35
Catches/stumpings	2/–	5/–	1/–	10/–
Medal record
Men's cricket
Representing India
ICC Cricket World Cup
Runner-up	2023 India
ACC Asia Cup
Winner	2023 Pakistan
- Source: Cricinfo, 28 July 2026

Muralikrishna Prasidh Krishna (Kannada: [pɾɐsɪd̪ːʱ kɾʊʂɳɐ]; born 19 February 1996) is an Indian international cricketer. He plays for the Indian national cricket team, as a right-arm fast-medium bowler. He represents Karnataka in domestic cricket and Gujarat Titans in the Indian Premier League. He was a part of the Indian squad which won the 2023 Asia Cup and were runners-up in the 2023 Cricket World Cup.

Krishna made his One Day International debut for the Indian cricket team on 23 March 2021 in their home series against England and took 4 wickets in the match, breaking a 24-year-old Indian record for most wickets on ODI debut. He made his Test debut at Centurion Park against South Africa where he took his debut Test wicket.

== Domestic career ==
Krishna made his first-class debut for Karnataka during Bangladesh A's tour of India in September 2015, taking 5 for 49 in a match marked by the absence of all three frontline Karnataka pace bowlers. He took a wicket off his first ball, dismissing Rony Talukdar, before taking the wickets of Anamul Haque, Soumya Sarkar and Nasir Hossain in his first spell to reduce Bangladesh A to 41/5. Karnataka went on to win the match by 4 wickets.

He made his List A debut for Karnataka in the 2016–17 Vijay Hazare Trophy on 25 February 2017. He made his Twenty20 debut for Karnataka in the 2017–18 Syed Mushtaq Ali Trophy on 21 January 2018.

He was the leading wicket-taker for Karnataka in the 2018–19 Vijay Hazare Trophy, with thirteen dismissals in seven matches.

In August 2018, he was named in the India A cricket team for the 2018 A-team Quadrangular Series. In December 2018, he was named in India's team for the 2018 ACC Emerging Teams Asia Cup.

During the 2021-22 Ranji Trophy, Krishna took his maiden first-class ten-wicket haul against Jammu and Kashmir picking up 6/35 in the first innings and 4/59 in the second innings.

== Indian Premier League ==
In April 2018, he was bought by the Kolkata Knight Riders team in the 2018 IPL season as a replacement for injured Kamlesh Nagarkoti. On 6 May 2018, he made his IPL debut against Mumbai Indians replacing injured Shivam Mavi. In February 2022, he was bought by the Rajasthan Royals for ₹10 Cr in the Mega auction for the 2022 Indian Premier League tournament.

At the 2025 IPL auction, he was signed by Gujarat Titans for ₹9.5 crore (US$1.0 million). During this season, Krishna picked up 25 wickets to earn the Purple Cap award for most wickets during the IPL season.

== International career ==
In March 2021, he was named in India's One Day International (ODI) squad for their series against England. He made his ODI debut for India on 23 March 2021, against England. He went on to take 4 wickets, helping India to win the match by 66 runs.

In May 2021, he was named as one of four standby players in India's Test squad for the final of the 2019–2021 ICC World Test Championship and their away series against England. In September 2021, he was added to India's main squad for the fourth Test match against England but didn't play.

In February 2022, Krishna was named in India's squad for the ODI series against West Indies. He was named the man of the match in the second match as he took 4 wickets for 12 runs and went on to win the man of the series award with a 3 wicket haul in the third game.

In May 2022, he was named in India's Test squad for the rescheduled fifth Test against England.

On 5 November 2023, he was added to India's squad for the 2023 Cricket World Cup after Hardik Pandya was ruled out owing to his ankle injury from the match against Bangladesh on 19 October 2023.

On 28 November 2023, Prasidh Krishna became the most expensive India bowler in T20Is conceding 68 runs in 4 overs.

Krishna was named in India's squad for the 2025 Anderson-Tendulkar Trophy. He was picked for the first, second, and fifth tests, taking a total of 14 wickets at an average of 37.07 for the series.
