= Ollie Pope =

English cricketer (born 1998)

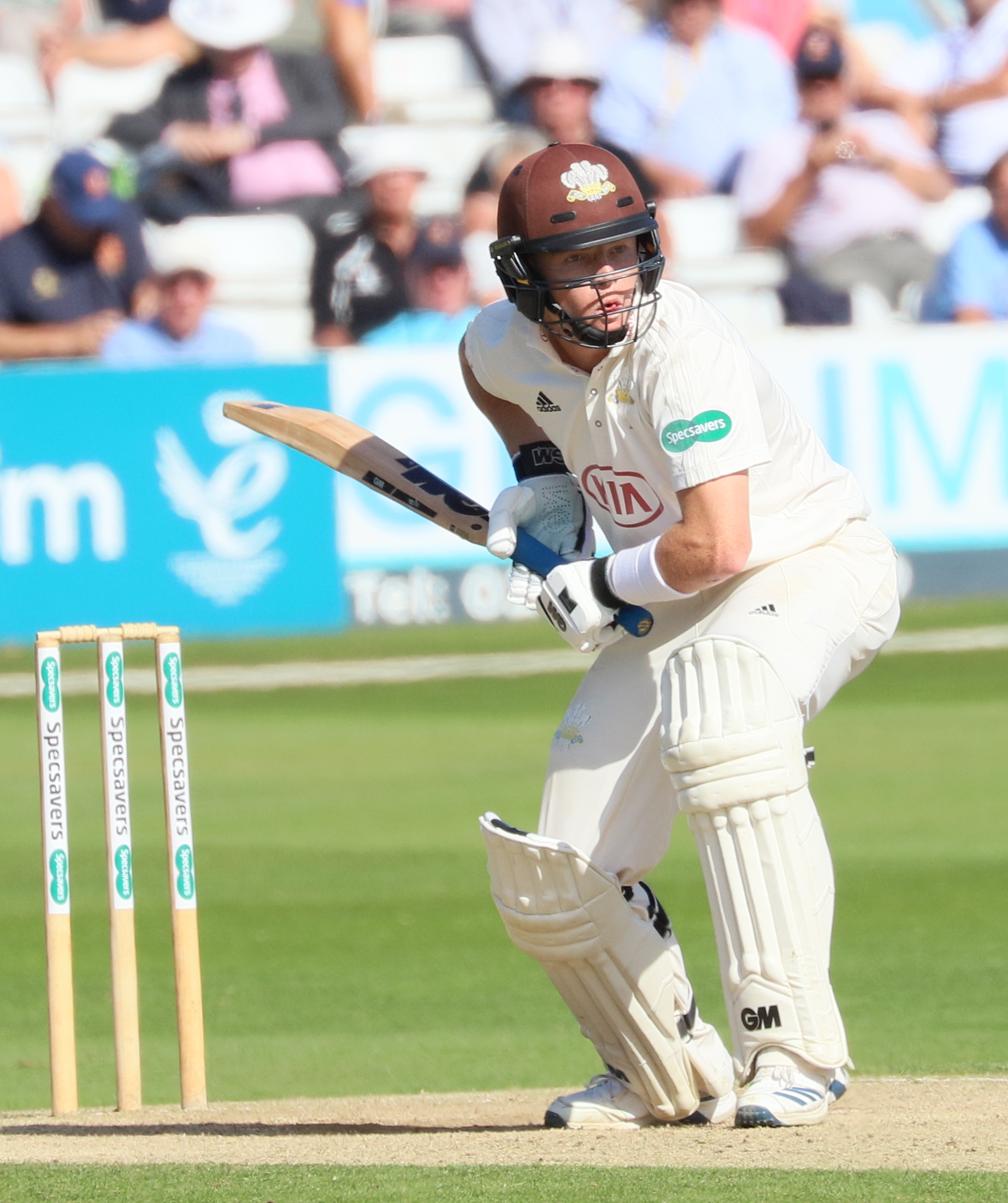
- Ollie Pope batting for Surrey in 2019

Personal information
- Full name: Oliver John Douglas Pope
- Born: 2 January 1998 (age 28); Chelsea, London, England
- Height: 5 ft 9 in (1.75 m)
- Batting: Right handed
- Role: Middle-order batter, Wicket-keeper

International information
- National side: England (2018–present)
- Test debut (cap 687): 9 August 2018 v India
- Last Test: 17 December 2025 v Australia

Domestic team information
- Years: Team
- 2016–present: Surrey
- 2022: Welsh Fire
- 2024–2025: London Spirit
- 2024/25: Adelaide Strikers
- 2026: MI London

Career statistics
Competition	Test	FC	LA	T20
Matches	64	142	31	99
Runs scored	3,732	9,400	767	1,963
Batting average	34.55	44.13	33.34	27.26
100s/50s	9/16	26/38	0/5	0/9
Top score	205	274	93*	99*
Catches/stumpings	79/1	183/2	9/0	41/3
- Source: ESPNcricinfo, 27 September 2026

Oliver John Douglas Pope (born 2 January 1998) is an English cricketer who plays for the England cricket team in Test cricket and is the former vice-captain. He plays domestically for Surrey County Cricket Club. He is a right-handed batter who occasionally plays as a wicket-keeper. He made his Test debut against India in 2018.

== Domestic career ==
Pope attended Cranleigh School and is the great-great-great-great-grandson of the school's first headmaster, Joseph Merriman. He played club cricket for both Guildford and Cranleigh Cricket Clubs and was a member of the Surrey age-group teams. Pope also played football and hockey for the school's teams, and he had to get an approval from the Cranleigh club to play for Surrey. Pope made his first XI debut in 2013 aged 15. He also toured South Africa with the Surrey Youth team, where Sam Curran, Ryan Patel and Amar Virdi were among his teammates.

On 26 August 2016, Pope signed a two-year professional contract with Surrey. Two days later, he made his List A debut for Surrey in the semi-final of the 2016 Royal London One-Day Cup against Yorkshire, making 20 runs off 23 balls.

He made his first-class debut on 28 March 2017 for Surrey against Oxford MCCU as part of the Marylebone Cricket Club University fixtures. Pope scored his maiden List A half-century on 7 May 2017 against Sussex. He made his Twenty20 debut for Surrey in the 2017 NatWest t20 Blast on 7 July 2017. Pope scored his maiden first-class century against Hampshire at the end of the 2017 season, at the age of 19.

During the 2017/18 winter, he was selected for the ECB's overseas placement programme in Australia whereby he played for the Campbelltown-Camden District Cricket Club in the NSW Premier Cricket League. Pope went on to score 994 runs, including 3 centuries, and even received a commendation in the New South Wales parliament for his on & off-field exploits from MP Chris Patterson, who was the club's vice-president. New South Wales minister for sport, Stuart Ayres, noted how rare it was for an NSW parliamentarian to praise an Englishman in such a way.

Pope's breakout year was 2018, when he hit 4 centuries and averaged 70.42 runs in Surrey's County Championship-winning campaign, and was awarded the PCA Young Player of the Year award. Pope accumulated a total of 684 runs in Division One of the County Championship, a total bested in the entire tournament only by his teammate Rory Burns. Pope's success continued into 2019, as he was the highest-scoring Surrey batter in their first-class season with 812 runs at an average of 101, including 3 centuries, across only 9 innings.

Pope re-entered the Surrey team for nine matches of the 2021 County Championship after the Covid disrupted 2020 season, scoring 861 runs at an average of 78.27, including totals of 245 against Leicestershire and a career-best 274 against Glamorgan.

In April 2022, he was bought by the Welsh Fire for the 2022 season of The Hundred 100-ball league.

In October 2026, Ollie Pope withdrew from the draft for the inaugural Afghanistan Premier League, scheduled to take place in the United Arab Emirates. Pope was expected to be the only centrally contracted England player in the draft.

== International career ==
Pope was added to England's squad for the second Test against India at Lord's, where he made his Test debut, on 9 August 2018. He made 28 in his only knock, as England won by an innings. Later that year, he was selected for England's tour of Sri Lanka. However, having played no part in England's first Test, he was released from the tour in order to join up with the England Lions for their game against Pakistan A in the UAE.

During a strong 2019 season, Pope was called up as cover for Jason Roy before the 3rd Ashes Test at Headingley. Although Roy was eventually passed fit to play, this saw Pope back in the International picture, and a month later he was called up to the England Test squad to face New Zealand. In the second Test at Hamilton, Pope made 75 runs in England's only innings. Pope then toured South Africa but missed the first test due to illness. He then top scored in the first innings of the second test with 61* and then followed this up with his maiden Test century for England in the third Test against South Africa in Port Elizabeth, with 135*.

On 29 May 2020, Pope was named in a 55-man group of players to begin training ahead of international fixtures starting in England following the COVID-19 pandemic. On 17 June 2020, Pope was included in England's 30-man squad to start training behind closed doors for the Test series against the West Indies. On 4 July 2020, Pope was named in England's thirteen-man squad for the first Test match of the series.

Pope played in all six Test matches of the 2020 England summer, scoring 215 runs at an average of 26.9 against Pakistan and the West Indies, including scores of 91 and 62. Due to a shoulder injury sustained during the Pakistan series, Pope was not included in the England squad for their 2021 tour of Sri Lanka, though he travelled with the tour party so that he could work on his fitness with the team's physiotherapist. He was also not originally included for England's 2021 tour of India, though again he accompanied the tour party, but was added after the England medical team were satisfied he had recovered sufficiently. Pope played in all four tests, scoring 153 runs at an average of 19.1, in England's 3–1 series defeat.

In England's 2021 series against New Zealand, Pope made 84 runs in 4 innings, with a highscore of just 23. Due to a quadriceps injury, Pope only played in the fourth Test against India in their tour of England, making scores of 81 and 2. Pope was included in England's squad for the 2021-22 Ashes.

Pope was included in the England squad for the 2022 test series against New Zealand. In the second Test he made a score of 145, which included 13 fours and 3 sixes.

On 16 May 2023, Pope was named England's vice-captain. In June 2023, Pope broke the record for the quickest Test double hundred to be made in England, as he reached 200 in just 207 balls at Lord's against Ireland, beating the previous best of 220 balls achieved by Ian Botham against India in 1982.

Pope suffered a dislocated shoulder in June 2023, preventing him from playing for several months. Pope was part of England's squad for the 5 match Test tour of India in 2024. In the second innings of the first test match of the series, he played a match-winning knock of 196 runs which is the fourth highest score by an Englishman in India.

Pope was part of England's squad for the three-match Test series in 2024 against the West Indies cricket team. When Ben Stokes was injured prior to England's series against Sri Lanka, Pope stepped up from vice-captain to lead the team in those three matches.

In 2025 in a one-off test against Zimbabwe at Trent Bridge, Pope played a knock of 171 off 166 balls and became the first Test cricketer to score each of his first 8 centuries against 8 different international teams.

In 2025, during England's first innings of the first Test match of the Anderson–Tendulkar Trophy against India, Pope scored a century, 18 months after his last century against India in 2024. This was his third consecutive century and ninth in total. Pope also took Karun Nair's catch off a ball by Ben Stokes. At the Headingley Cricket Ground in Leeds, Pope and Ben Duckett had a partnership of 122 runs for the second wicket. When Pope had scored 60 runs, his catch was dropped by Yashasvi Jaiswal. Alastair Cook, formerly England's Test captain, said Pope played well against baller Jasprit Bumrah despite the conditions. Cook said Pope does not seem to be in a frenzy anymore and India will have to rethink its bowling strategy against him.

In September 2025, following concerns of his form Pope was stripped of the vice-captaincy of the England test team ahead of the 2025-26 Ashes with Harry Brook replacing him as vice-captain. England Cricket Team managing director Rob Key susbsequently refused to confirm whether Pope's place in the England test team was safe for the future. After three Tests in Australia in which he scored 125 runs 20.83 he was replaced by Bethell for the Boxing Day Test.

== Batting style ==
Veteran cricketers Sachin Tendulkar, Brett Lee and Kevin Pietersen have compared Pope's technique to that of English cricketer Ian Bell. Similarities with Bell are often drawn to Pope's "elegant" cover drive, ability to rotate the strike, and "compact" technique.

== Bibliography ==
- Shemilt, Stephan (6 August 2018). "Ollie Pope: How the Vatican, snakes and laundry made England's new batsman". BBC Sport.
