= Rory Burns =

English cricketer

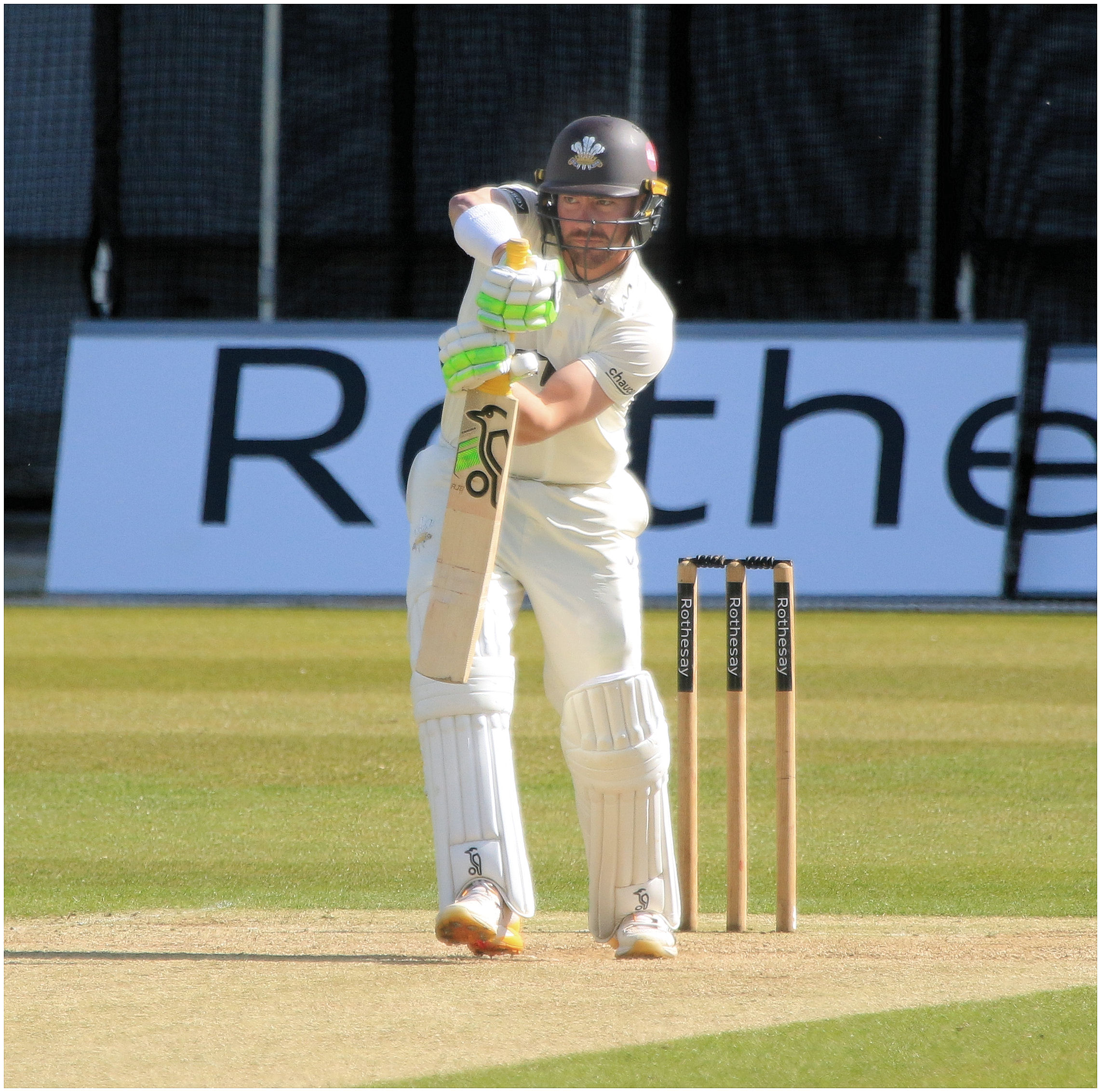
- Burns in 2026

Personal information
- Full name: Rory Joseph Burns
- Born: 26 August 1990 (age 36); Epsom, Surrey, England
- Height: 5 ft 10 in (178 cm)
- Batting: Left-handed
- Bowling: Right-arm medium
- Role: Opening batsman

International information
- National side: England (2018–2022)
- Test debut (cap 688): 6 November 2018 v Sri Lanka
- Last Test: 14 January 2022 v Australia

Domestic team information
- Years: Team
- 2011–present: Surrey

Career statistics
Competition	Test	FC	LA	T20
Matches	32	229	85	78
Runs scored	1,789	14,714	2,236	976
Batting average	30.32	39.55	29.03	17.42
100s/50s	3/11	28/82	0/13	0/3
Top score	133	227	95	62
Catches/stumpings	24/–	172/0	46/2	32/1
- Source: ESPNcricinfo, 27 September 2026

Rory Joseph Burns (born 26 August 1990) is an English cricketer who has played internationally for the England Test cricket team. In domestic cricket, he captains Surrey in first-class and List A cricket.

Burns made his Test debut in 2018. He led Surrey to the 2018, 2022, 2023 and 2024 County Championship titles. He plays as a left-handed opening batsman and an occasional wicket-keeper.

== Early life ==
Burns was born in Epsom, Surrey, and educated at City of London Freemen's School in Ashtead, Surrey, Whitgift School and Cardiff Metropolitan University (UWIC). Whilst at Whitgift school, Rory Burns played with fellow England international Jason Roy, who is the same age.

== Domestic career ==
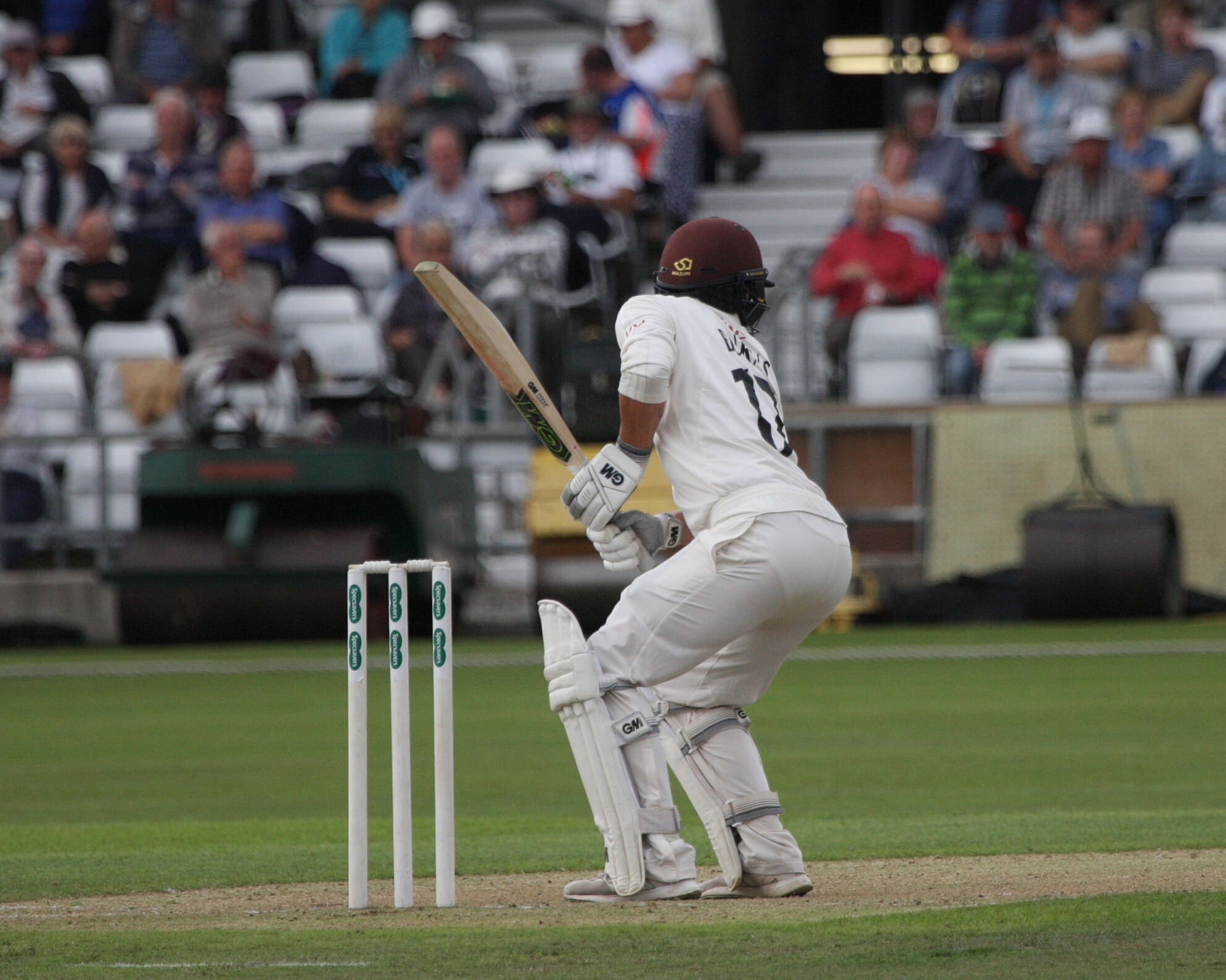
Burns batting for Surrey in 2017

Having played Second XI cricket for both Surrey and Hampshire, Burns made his first-class debut for Surrey against Cambridge MCCU in May 2011. He made scores of 23 and 16, and keeping wicket ahead of regular keepers Steven Davies and Gary Wilson he took two catches. This was his only first team appearance for Surrey in the 2011 season.

In the 2012 season, he scored a century against Leeds Bradford MCCU and filled in as wicket-keeper in one game before being called upon to open the batting in early July against Lancashire. He remained on the team for the rest of the season finishing with 741 runs at an average of 49.4.

He continued to open the batting in 2013 and 2014, playing all Surrey's first-class games in both seasons. He scored 1000 runs in a season for the first time in 2014. In June 2015, whilst playing for Surrey in a NatWest t20 Blast game against Sussex Sharks at Arundel Castle, Burns collided with teammate Moisés Henriques while attempting to take a catch. Both players were knocked unconscious from the collision with Burns requiring stitches to facial injuries and Henriques suffering a broken jaw. Ambulances and medical staff treated the players on-field before taking them both to hospital. The game was abandoned due to the injuries. Burns returned to the team in late-June and finished the season with 1019 First-Class runs at an average of 48.52. He also played in 7 of Surrey's 10 games in the Royal London Cup, including all the knock-out games, scoring 364 runs.

His good form in the previous season saw him selected to represent the Marylebone Cricket Club (MCC) against the champions Yorkshire in the traditional curtain-raiser to the 2016 English cricket season. In July 2017, he made his highest score of 219 not out versus Hampshire whilst deputising as captain in place of the injured Gareth Batty; the first time he had captained Surrey in a first class match. Before the 2018 season, Burns was appointed club captain for first-class and List A formats, with Batty stepping down.

In the 2018 season, Burns led Surrey to their first County Championship title since 2002. In the process, he scored over 1000 runs for the fifth consecutive season, finishing the season overall as Division One's top run-scorer, with 1359 runs at an average of 64.71.

Burns's Surrey availability was limited in 2019, 2020 and 2021 by his England duties. In the 2019 County Championship, Burns scored 603 runs in 8 matches at an average of 37.68. Burns only played one match in Surrey's 2020 Bob Willis Trophy campaign, hitting 103 and 52 against Sussex. Playing 9 matches in the 2021 County Championship, Burns scored 617 runs at an average of 47.46.

In April 2022, he was bought by the Oval Invincibles for the 2022 season of The Hundred.

== International career ==
In September 2018, Burns was named in England's Test squad for their tour of Sri Lanka, replacing the retiring Alastair Cook. He made his Test debut on 6 November 2018, and played all three matches in the series, making 155 runs at an average of 25.83. This was enough for Burns to hold his place into England's tour of the West Indies, where he averaged 24.16, and fell short of a maiden Test century with 84 in the first Test.

After a disappointing first home Test, scoring just 12 runs against Ireland, Burns was selected as England's opener for the Ashes alongside Surrey teammate Jason Roy. Burns made his maiden Test century in the first Test at Edgbaston, scoring 133 in "an urgent, scrappy, dogged" innings after a period of poor form. Burns success continued throughout the Ashes - he was the series' third highest scorer, making 390 runs in 10 innings, supplementing his century with scores of 53 and 81.

Burns's good form continued into the 2019–20 winter, as he scored 184 runs in just 3 innings against New Zealand, including his second Test century at Hamilton. However, after scoring 84 in England's first Test against South Africa, Burns was ruled out the last 3 Tests after rolling his ankle playing a game of football. The injury would have also ruled him out of England's upcoming tour of Sri Lanka, but the series was later cancelled due to the COVID-19 pandemic. Burns came back into the team for the behind closed doors Test series against West Indies and Pakistan in 2020. Against the West Indies, Burns scored 234 runs - England's second most - at 46.80, including two half-centuries in the third Test. However, this success was followed by a series of failures against Pakistan, Burns scoring just 20 runs in his 4 innings.

After missing England's 2021 tour of Sri Lanka for the birth of his child, Burns rejoined the team for their tour of India. After scoring just 58 runs in the first two Tests (including 2 ducks), Burns was dropped for the final two Tests.

Burns was immediately brought back into the team for England's 2021 home series against New Zealand, and found form straight away. Named England's player of the series, Burns scored 238 runs at 59.50, including 132 in the first Test and 81 in the second. In the following four home Tests against India, Burns made two half-centuries and two ducks, averaging just 26.14.

Opening for England in the 2021–22 Ashes, Burns had a disastrous start, being bowled for a golden duck with the opening ball of the first day. This made Burns the first man since Stan Worthington in 1936 to be dismissed with the first ball of an Ashes series. Burns played in three Tests over the full series scoring 77 runs at an average of 12.83. He was not included for England's subsequent Test tour of the West Indies.

== Personal life ==
Burns missed England's 2021 tour of Sri Lanka for the birth of his daughter.

Burns is very close to his school, Surrey and England teammate Jason Roy, both of them serving as each other's best man at their weddings.
