= Pat Brown (cricketer) =

English cricketer (born 1998)

Personal information
- Full name: Patrick Rhys Brown
- Born: 23 August 1998 (age 28); Peterborough, Cambridgeshire, England
- Batting: Right-handed
- Bowling: Right-arm fast-medium
- Role: Bowler

International information
- National side: England (2019)
- T20I debut (cap 86): 1 November 2019 v New Zealand
- Last T20I: 8 November 2019 v New Zealand

Domestic team information
- Years: Team
- 2017–2023: Worcestershire (squad no. 36)
- 2019: Sylhet Sixers
- 2021: Birmingham Phoenix
- 2021/22: Peshawar Zalmi
- 2022: Oval Invincibles
- 2023: → Derbyshire (on loan)
- 2024–present: Derbyshire (squad no. 36)
- 2024–2025: Northern Superchargers

Career statistics
Competition	T20I	FC	LA	T20
Matches	4	16	18	113
Runs scored	4	57	17	67
Batting average	–	14.25	8.50	7.44
100s/50s	0/0	0/0	0/0	0/0
Top score	4*	15*	7	10*
Balls bowled	78	1,391	814	2,191
Wickets	3	18	27	139
Bowling average	42.66	56.44	33.03	25.20
5 wickets in innings	0	0	1	0
10 wickets in match	0	0	0	0
Best bowling	1/29	2/15	5/37	4/21
Catches/stumpings	2/–	7/–	8/–	41/–
- Source: ESPNcricinfo, 26 August 2025

Patrick Rhys Brown (born 23 August 1998) is an English cricketer who plays for Derbyshire, having previously played for Worcestershire. He made his international debut for England in November 2019.

== Domestic, T20 and franchise career ==
Brown made his Twenty20 cricket debut for Worcestershire in the 2017 NatWest t20 Blast on 26 July 2017. He made his first-class debut for Worcestershire in the 2017 County Championship on 6 August 2017. He made his List A debut for Worcestershire in the 2018 Royal London One-Day Cup on 23 May 2018.

Brown was the leading wicket taker in the 2018 Vitality Blast taking 31 wickets. This included 4–21 against Lancashire County Cricket Club which meant the Worcestershire Rapids progressed to the final of the Vitality t20 Blast on 15 September 2018 and took on the Sussex Sharks . Worcestershire went on to beat the Sharks by 4 wickets in the final to secure their maiden T20 Blast Trophy.

In October 2018, he was named in the squad for the Sylhet Sixers team, following the draft for the 2018–19 Bangladesh Premier League.

In November 2019, Brown signed with Melbourne Stars for the 2019–20 Big Bash League season replacing Dale Steyn who had gone back to South Africa due to international commitments.

Having already agreed a permanent move to Derbyshire for the 2024 season, Brown joined them early on loan in September 2023.

== International career ==
In September 2019, Brown was named in England's Twenty20 International (T20I) squad for their series against New Zealand. He made his T20I debut for England, against New Zealand, on 1 November 2019. The following month, Brown was named in England's One Day International (ODI) squad for their series against South Africa. However, in January 2020, Brown was ruled out of England's ODI and T20I squads, following a stress fracture to his lower back.

On 29 May 2020, Brown was named in a 55-man group of players to begin training ahead of international fixtures starting in England following the COVID-19 pandemic.

He was included in the England Lions squad to tour Australia in January 2025.
