= Dom Bess =

English cricketer (born 1997)

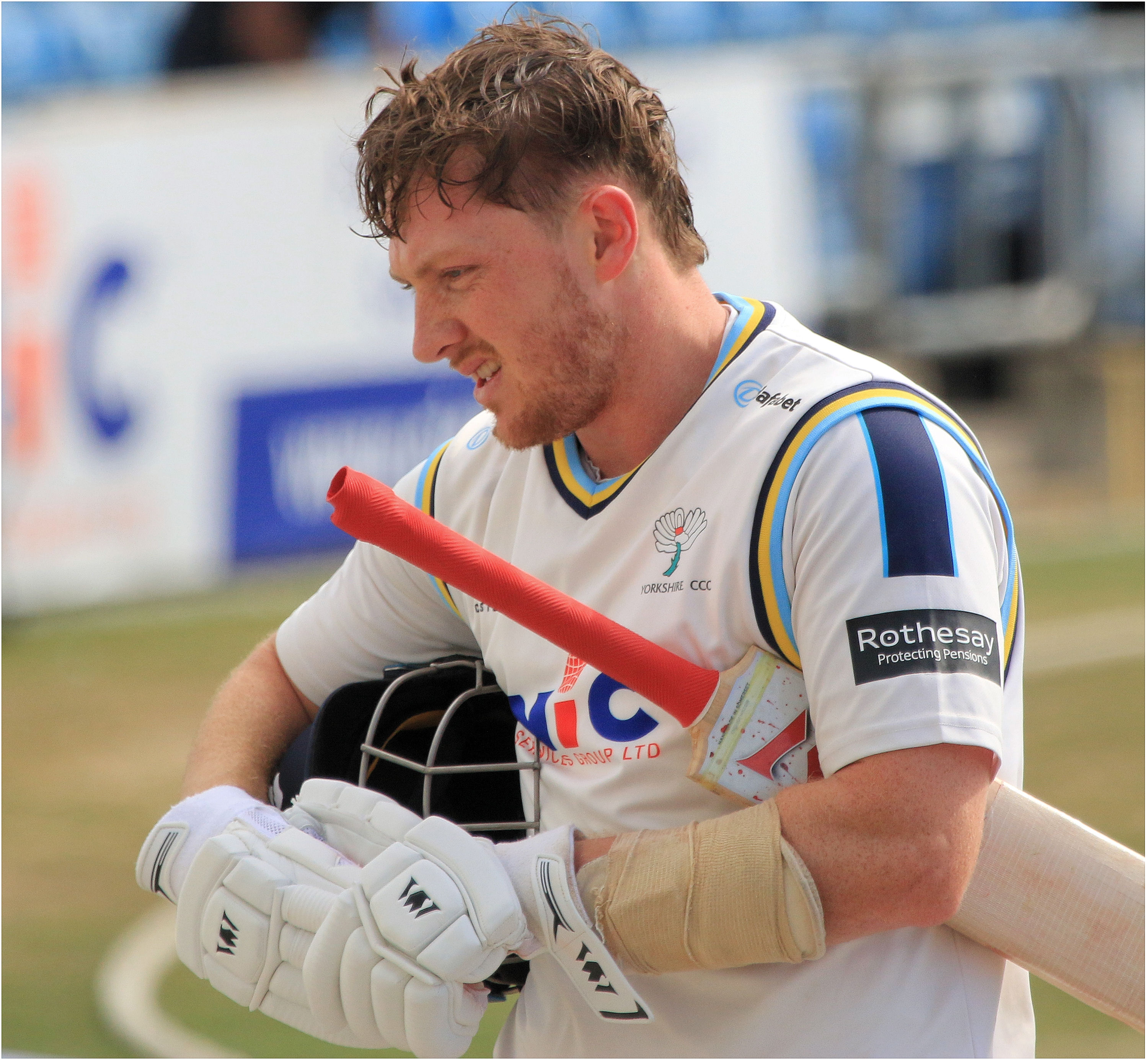
- Bess in 2025

Personal information
- Full name: Dominic Mark Bess
- Born: 22 July 1997 (age 29); Exeter, Devon, England
- Batting: Right-handed
- Bowling: Right-arm off break
- Role: Bowling all-rounder

International information
- National side: England (2018–2021)
- Test debut (cap 685): 24 May 2018 v Pakistan
- Last Test: 4 March 2021 v India

Domestic team information
- Years: Team
- 2016–2020: Somerset
- 2018–2019: Marylebone Cricket Club (MCC)
- 2019: → Yorkshire (on loan)
- 2021–: Yorkshire
- 2023: → Warwickshire (on loan)
- 2023: → Somerset (on loan)
- 2023/24: Southern Rocks

Career statistics
Competition	Test	FC	LA	T20
Matches	14	127	60	79
Runs scored	319	4,304	731	366
Batting average	22.78	26.56	19.75	13.55
100s/50s	0/1	2/23	0/4	0/1
Top score	57	107	60	53
Balls bowled	2,502	22,237	2,626	1,326
Wickets	36	328	54	60
Bowling average	33.97	33.81	44.12	28.83
5 wickets in innings	2	18	1	0
10 wickets in match	0	1	0	0
Best bowling	5/30	7/43	5/37	3/15
Catches/stumpings	3/–	69/–	35/–	38/–
- Source: Cricinfo, 26 September 2026

Dominic Mark Bess (born 22 July 1997) is an English professional cricketer who has played internationally for the England Test cricket team. In domestic cricket, he represents Yorkshire, having previously played for Somerset. Bess made his Test debut in 2018. He plays as a right-handed all-rounder, bowling off break.

== Early and personal life ==
From Sidmouth in Devon, Bess joined Somerset's academy when he was 16. He went to spend time at Darren Lehmann’s Adelaide academy in 2015. He has attributed his career as a spinner to the shorter run up required compared to fast bowling: "I was always a little porker when I was younger, so I never took the long run-up," he said. "I always took five or six steps and just trotted in." He was also a keen rugby player in his youth, playing fly-half, and attributes former Somerset fitness coach Darren Veness as the biggest influence on his strength and conditioning improvements.

== Cricket career ==
=== Domestic career ===
On 3 July 2016 Bess made his first-class debut for Somerset during Pakistan's tour of England. He failed to take a wicket (ending with match figures of 0-128) and scored a combined 25 runs. He made his T20 debut for Somerset in their final game of the 2016 season against Hampshire on 29 July 2016 in which he took bowling figures of 1-31 and scored a solitary run.

==== Championship debut ====
Bess took 13 wickets in the later stages of the 2016 County Championship. He was included in the team for his first Championship game against Warwickshire. His first two championship wickets were Jonathan Trott and Ian Bell, and he took career best figures of 6-28 from 16 overs in the first innings, and finished with match figures of 8-59 off 27 overs. Bess also featured heavily in Somerset's last game of the season against the already relegated Nottinghamshire as he took his second career five wicket haul with 1st innings figures of 5-43 from 22.5 overs including a spell of 5 consecutive maidens, giving him match figures of 5-77 from 32.5 overs. He also scored 41 runs in Somerset's first innings.

At the end of the 2016 season, Bess signed his first professional contract with Somerset agreeing a two-year deal; keeping him at the club until the end of the 2018 season. On 8 May 2019, Bess went on loan to Yorkshire for a month. In August 2020, Bess confirmed that he would be leaving Somerset at the end of the season, subsequently it was announced that Bess had signed a four-year contract with Yorkshire. In September 2024, Bess signed a new two-year contract with Yorkshire. He agreed a further two-year extension to remain at the club until at least the end of the 2028 season in April 2026.

=== International career ===
Having previously represented England at U-19 level, Bess was included in the England Lions squad in the summer of 2017 for a match against the touring South Africa A team, though he did not play. He was then selected for the Lions squads for the winter tours to Australia and the West Indies. He took 5/88 on his England Lions debut, in Antigua.

Called up after an injury to his county teammate Jack Leach, Bess made his Test debut for England against Pakistan on 24 May 2018 at Lord's. Though he shared a century stand with Jos Buttler in England's second innings – making a score of 57 – Bess failed to take a wicket or stop his side succumbing to a nine-wicket defeat. However, in the second Test of the series, Bess took his first Test wicket, of Imam-ul-Haq. Overall in the match, he took 3 wickets and contributed 49 with the bat, as a nightwatchman. England went on to win the match by an innings and 55 runs.

In January 2020, in the third Test against South Africa, Bess took his maiden five-wicket haul in Test cricket. On 29 May 2020, Bess was named in a 55-man group of players to begin training ahead of international fixtures starting in England following the COVID-19 pandemic. On 17 June 2020, Bess was included in England's 30-man squad to start training behind closed doors for the Test series against the West Indies. On 4 July 2020, Bess was named in England's thirteen-man squad for the first Test match of the series.
