= Dom Sibley =

English cricketer (born 1995)

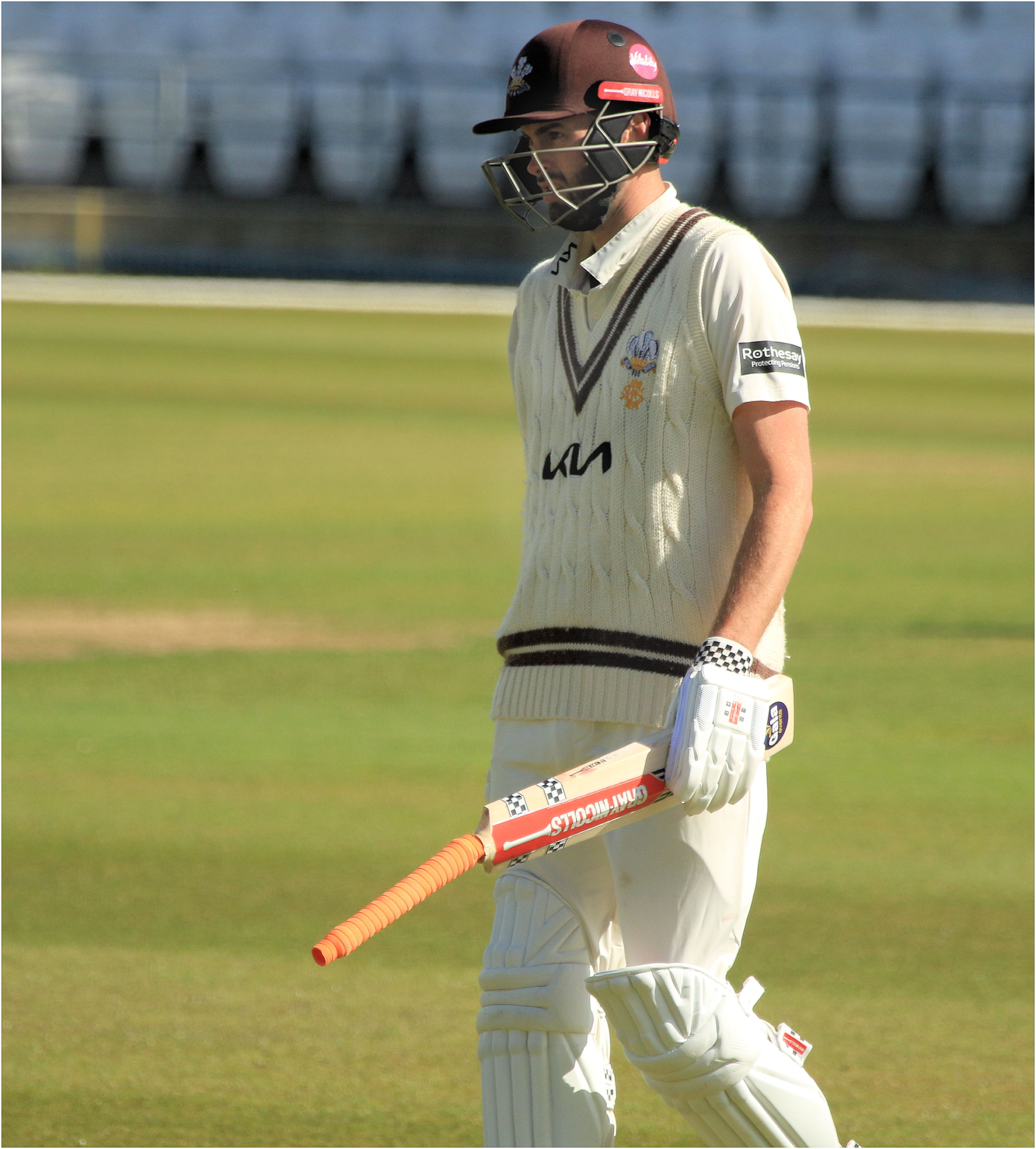
- Sibley in 2026

Personal information
- Full name: Dominic Peter Sibley
- Born: 5 September 1995 (age 31); Epsom, Surrey, England
- Height: 6 ft 3 in (1.91 m)
- Batting: Right-handed
- Bowling: Right-arm leg break
- Role: Opening batsman

International information
- National side: England (2019–2021)
- Test debut (cap 694): 21 November 2019 v New Zealand
- Last Test: 12 August 2021 v India

Domestic team information
- Years: Team
- 2013–2017: Surrey (squad no. 45)
- 2017: → Warwickshire (on loan)
- 2018–2022: Warwickshire (squad no. 45)
- 2023–present: Surrey (squad no. 45)
- 2025: Khulna Tigers

Career statistics
Competition	Test	FC	LA	T20
Matches	22	170	52	57
Runs scored	1,042	10,554	1,636	1,358
Batting average	28.94	40.90	34.80	27.16
100s/50s	2/5	29/51	6/6	0/9
Top score	133*	305	149	74*
Balls bowled	6	441	54	228
Wickets	0	4	1	5
Bowling average	–	81.50	62.00	66.70
5 wickets in innings	–	0	0	0
10 wickets in match	–	0	0	0
Best bowling	–	2/103	1/20	2/33
Catches/stumpings	12/–	128/–	25/–	25/–
- Source: ESPNcricinfo, 27 September 2026

Dominic Peter Sibley (born 5 September 1995) is an English professional cricketer who has played internationally for the England Test cricket team. In domestic cricket, he represents Surrey having previously played for Warwickshire.

Sibley made his Test debut in 2019. He plays as a right-handed opening batsman.

== Career ==
He is a right-handed batsman who bowls right-arm leg break. He made his List A debut for Surrey against Essex on 2 August 2013, though he had to retire due to injury.

In just his third first-class cricket match, while still a student at Whitgift School, he scored a double century against Yorkshire aged 18 years and 21 days. In doing so he became the youngest double-centurion in the history of the County Championship, the second-youngest Englishman to score a first-class double hundred and the thirteenth youngest double-centurion of any nationality. On the final day of the four-day match, Sibley was out (bowled by Ryan Sidebottom) for 242.

In August 2017, Sibley turned down an offer of a new three-year contract with Surrey to join Warwickshire ahead of the 2018 season. On 3 August 2017, Sibley moved on loan to Warwickshire for the remainder of the 2017 season with Rikki Clarke moving in the other direction.

In September 2019, he was named in England's Test squad for their series against New Zealand. He made his Test debut for England, against New Zealand, on 21 November 2019. Early in his Test career it was recognised that Sibley, nicknamed “the Fridge”, had emerged from county cricket not fit enough for the rigours of the five day game, which he was addressing. On 6 January 2020, Sibley scored his first century in Test cricket, in the second match against South Africa. This was the first hundred by an England opener at Newlands since Jack Hobbs in 1910.

On 29 May 2020, Sibley was named in a 55-man group of players to begin training ahead of international fixtures starting in England following the COVID-19 pandemic. On 17 June 2020, Sibley was included in England's 30-man squad to start training behind closed doors for the Test series against the West Indies. On 4 July 2020, Sibley was named in England's thirteen-man squad for the first Test match of the series going on to play in all three matches in the series and scoring his second international century in the second Test. He was dropped from the England team in 2021 after a run of bad form.

During Surrey's County Championship game against Kent, Sibley made an unbeaten 140 off 415 balls in 578 minutes in Surrey’s successful run chase of 501, it was one of the slowest centuries in Championship history.

On 30 June 2025, Sibley made his maiden first-class triple century, scoring 305 against Durham at The Oval as Surrey amassed 820 for 9 declared, their highest team total in the format.

== Franchise career ==
He signed with Khulna Tigers in 2025 to play in the Bangladesh Premier League.
