= Jack Leach =

English cricketer (born 1991)

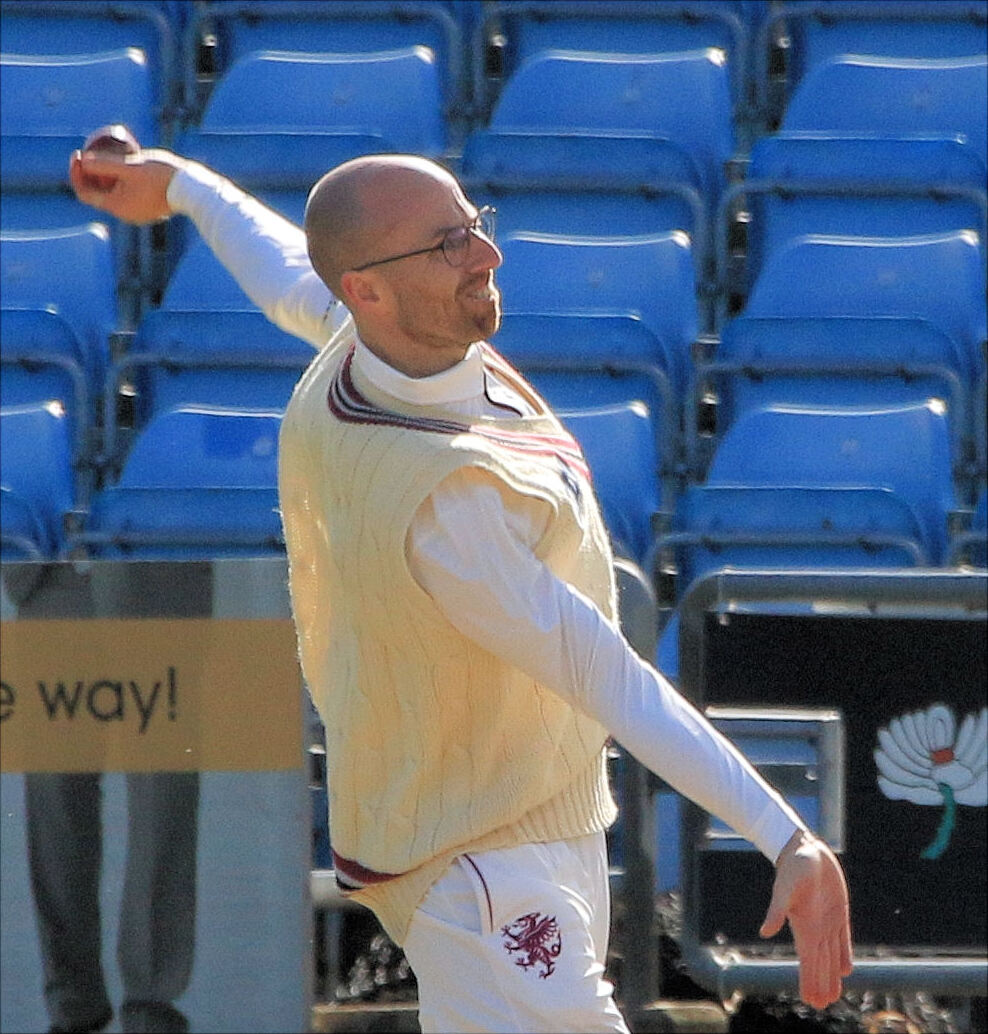
- Leach in 2024

Personal information
- Full name: Matthew Jack Leach
- Born: 22 June 1991 (age 35); Taunton, Somerset, England
- Nickname: Leachy, The Nut
- Batting: Left-handed
- Bowling: Slow left-arm orthodox
- Role: Bowler

International information
- National side: England (2018–2024)
- Test debut (cap 684): 30 March 2018 v New Zealand
- Last Test: 24 October 2024 v Pakistan

Domestic team information
- Years: Team
- 2010–present: Somerset (squad no. 17)
- 2011–2012: Cardiff MCCU

Career statistics
| Competition | Test | FC | LA | T20 |
|---|---|---|---|---|
| Matches | 39 | 178 | 36 | 11 |
| Runs scored | 498 | 2,330 | 74 | 12 |
| Batting average | 13.45 | 13.86 | 8.22 | 12.00 |
| 100s/50s | 0/1 | 0/3 | 0/0 | 0/0 |
| Top score | 92 | 92 | 18 | 8* |
| Balls bowled | 9,402 | 34,787 | 1,795 | 216 |
| Wickets | 142 | 583 | 48 | 17 |
| Bowling average | 34.07 | 27.16 | 28.31 | 17.94 |
| 5 wickets in innings | 5 | 35 | 1 | 0 |
| 10 wickets in match | 1 | 5 | 0 | 0 |
| Best bowling | 5/66 | 8/85 | 6/26 | 3/20 |
| Catches/stumpings | 18/– | 70/– | 22/– | 4/– |
- Source: ESPNcricinfo, 27 September 2026

Matthew Jack Leach (born 22 June 1991) is an English professional cricketer who plays internationally for the England Test cricket team. In domestic cricket, he represents Somerset. Leach made his Test debut in 2018. He plays as a left-arm orthodox spin bowler.

== Early life and education ==
Leach was born in Taunton, England on 22 June 1991, and attended Trinity School, Bishop Fox's School and Richard Huish College all in Taunton. He used to be employed to park trolleys at a branch of Sainsbury's supermarket in Taunton. At the age of 14, Leach was diagnosed with Crohn's disease.

== Cricket career ==
Leach graduated from the Somerset County Cricket Club academy in the summer of 2010, prior to signing a professional contract with Somerset. Leach represented Dorset County Cricket Club in the 2010 Minor Counties Cricket Championship, and bowled his side to victory in the final against Lincolnshire taking 6/21 in their second innings. Leach completed his degree at the University of Wales Institute, Cardiff in sports coaching. Whilst attending university Leach represented Cardiff MCCU in 2011 and 2012 making his first-class debut against his county side Somerset in March 2012, bowling 41 overs but failing to take a wicket as Somerset amassed 642/3d.

Leach made his Somerset debut in a two-day match against the touring South Africans in July 2012, claiming the prized wicket of Hashim Amla. He made his first-class debut for Somerset in the 2012 County Championship match against Lancashire in August 2012, the rain affected match finished as a draw with Leach claiming Kyle Hogg as his maiden first-class wicket. Further opportunities in the first team were limited for the rest of the 2012 season with the signing of Pakistani spinner Abdur Rehman, and Leach only featured in one further County Championship match and three matches in the 2012 Clydesdale Bank 40, but ended the season ninth in the national first-class averages with 12 wickets at 18.83 runs apiece. Leach spent the 2012–13 winter playing grade cricket for Valley District Cricket Club in Brisbane, Australia, helping his side to win the T20 competition.

Leach returned to Somerset for pre-season on a summer contract and played his first Championship game of the season against Warwickshire due to an injury to first choice spinner George Dockrell; he took his maiden five-wicket haul in the second innings, with 24 of his 44 overs being maidens. Leach made his Twenty20 debut on 23 June 2021, for Somerset in the 2021 T20 Blast.

In April 2022, he was bought by the Birmingham Phoenix for the 2022 season of The Hundred.

Leach signed a new two-year contract with Somerset in June 2024.

== International career ==
On 14 February 2018, while playing for the England Lions against West Indies A, Leach achieved match figures of 8–110; in doing so, he beat the previous best figures by an England Lions spinner (Graeme Swann's 8–156).

=== 2018–21: Sporadic appearances ===
On 16 March 2018, he was called up to England's Test squad for the tour of New Zealand as an injury replacement for Mason Crane. He made his debut in the second Test in Christchurch.

After losing his place to Adil Rashid and then Moeen Ali in the 2018 home summer, Leach was recalled for the winter tour of Sri Lanka. In an unusual circumstance, with one over left to play in the day during the second test, Leach opened England's innings as a nightwatchman, surviving till stumps. He was dismissed for 1 off 11 balls the next morning. He did not play in England's subsequent tour of the West Indies but returned for the one-off Test against Ireland. Leach was once again the nightwatchman for England, batting for a single over at the close of day one. England won the Test by 143 runs, with Leach scoring 92 runs, which earned him the man of the match award.

After Ali was preferred for the first 2019 Ashes test, Leach was then recalled for the second Ashes test at Lords, on 14 August 2019, where he scored 6 not out in the first innings and took 1-19 and 3–37 in Australia's first and second innings respectively. England drew the match. In one of the most dramatic finishes in test match history, Leach scored one run, tying the game, in a partnership of 76 with Ben Stokes, to help England win the third Ashes test at Headingley, by one wicket. It has been described as "arguably the greatest one not out in the history of the game". Leach gained a cult following over the summer of 2019, with his glasses being a contributing factor. He regularly cleans them through his innings, and has received free Specsavers glasses for life following his heroics supporting Ben Stokes in the dramatic Headingley test. This cult reputation was enhanced by his behaviour off the pitch, such as leading some of the England team out to recreate his famous run at Headingley after the match. Leach played the rest of the series including a pivotal role in the final test, bowling England to victory with figures of 4–49.

Over the 2019–20 winter, Leach only played one of England's six tests: he was not selected for the second test against New Zealand, England opting to play an extra seam bowler instead; he missed the Basil D'Oliveira Trophy due to illness.

On 29 May 2020, Leach was named in a 55-man group of players to begin training ahead of international fixtures starting in England following the COVID-19 pandemic. On 17 June 2020, Leach was included in England's 30-man squad to start training behind closed doors for the Test series against the West Indies. However, Dominic Bess was preferred for the 2020 home summer.

Leach returned to the team for the winter tours against Sri Lanka and the Anthony De Mello Trophy. Therein he took 28 wickets across the six tests, but did not retain his place for the summer; England instead opting not to use a spinner against New Zealand and then preferring Moeen Ali for the Pataudi Trophy.

=== 2021–2024: First choice spinner ===
Following the sudden retirement of Ali, Leach was included in the 2021–22 Ashes series squad and was selected ahead of Stuart Broad for the first test at The Gabba despite the pitch being a "green top" which favoured the seamers. He returned match figures of 1–102 with an economy rate of 7.84, one of the worst innings economy rates in history. He was in and out of the team for the rest of the series – England choosing not to play him when a pink ball was in use – but improved through the series and finished with six wickets at an average of 53.50. He played all three Tests in the inaugural Richards–Botham Trophy and finished joint leading wicket taker in the series with Kemar Roach and Jayden Seales as England lost the series 1–0. He also scored 41 not out in the final test but it was not enough to prevent defeat.

Following the ascendency of Ben Stokes to the captaincy Leach was given a more senior role in the side, playing every test match for which he was available. Despite being ruled out of the first test against New Zealand due to a concussion sustained whilst fielding, he returned for the next test, and in the final test of the series he recorded his first ten-wicket haul in Tests with 10–166 in the match. He was less prolific against South Africa, as the low-scoring nature of the series meant he was often not required to bowl, but in the 2022–23 winter he took 25 wickets across five tests against Pakistan and New Zealand, including a five-wicket haul in Wellington.

The media, and Leach himself, have praised Stokes's handling of Leach. Notably, Stokes has kept attacking fields for Leach even when batters have looked to attack him. Leach ended 2022 as the third-highest wicket-taker in the world, behind only Kagiso Rabada and Nathan Lyon.

After feeling a pain in his back during the first Test match of the 2023 summer, Leach was ruled out of the subsequent Ashes series with a lower back stress fracture.

In January 2024, Leach played in the first Test against India and suffered a knee injury and was unable to play the remainder of the series. In June, Leach's Somerset teammate Shoaib Bashir was preferred to play for the Test squad against the West Indies.

In October 2024, Leach returned to the England team for the first match of their three-Test series against Pakistan, taking seven wickets in the contest including 4/30 in the hosts' second innings.

== See also ==
- List of people diagnosed with Crohn's disease
