= A168 road =

Road in North Yorkshire, England

A168

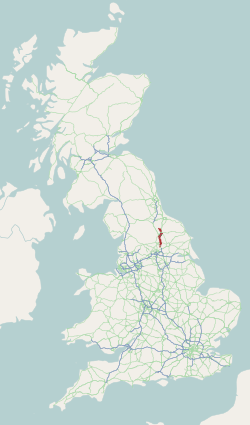

Route information
- Length: 34 mi (55 km)

Major junctions
- South end: Boston Spa, near Wetherby
- A659; A58 A661; A59 A6055 A1(M) A167; A19 A170; A61 A167
- North end: Northallerton

Location
- Country: United Kingdom
- Primary destinations: Wetherby, Thirsk, Northallerton

Road network
- Roads in the United Kingdom; Motorways; A and B road zones
← A167	→ A169

The A168 is a major road in North Yorkshire, England. It runs from Northallerton to Wetherby, acting as a local access road for the A1(M).

== History ==
The majority of it was built during A1 upgrades as parts of it between Dishforth and Walshford are originally part of the old A1 southbound carriageway until it was upgraded to the A1(M) several feet to the west.

The original route ran from Topcliffe to Northallerton, the current southern section of the A167.

== Route ==
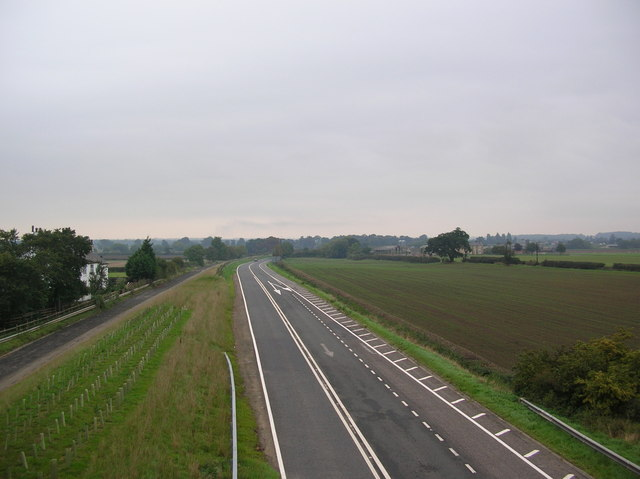
Former route of the A1, looking south at Ox Close House at North Deighton

Heading northwards, it begins at the roundabout with the A659 (Wattlesyke for Collingham) near junction 45 of the A1(M). This section of road was built when the A1 was improved to A1(M) in the Bramham to Wetherby section of the A1 Darrington to Dishforth scheme which was completed in December 2009. At Sweep Farm it follows the route of the former A1. It meets the eastern terminus of the A58 at a roundabout, and follows the former A1 Wetherby bypass across the River Wharfe, built in 1959. It runs next to the motorway Wetherby bypass and there is a roundabout for the former B1224, for Wetherby Racecourse. There is a roundabout for an industrial estate and then one for the newly diverted B1224, and junction 46 of the A1(M), where it rejoins the former Great North Road. There is a junction for Kirk Deighton then one for Cowthorpe. At Walshford Bridge it crosses the River Nidd.

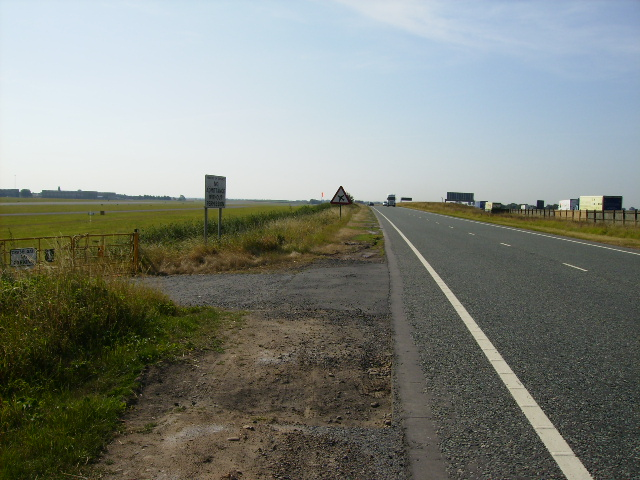
Next to Dishforth Airfield, on the former Dere Street

The former route of the A1 went through Walshford. The A1 Wetherby to Walshford section opened in August 2005, when the former A1 south of Walshford became the A168. At Great Ribston with Walshford there is a roundabout for Walshford west of the A1(M), and on the eastern side, there is a roundabout for Hunsingore. The A168 from 1995 to 2005 terminated at Walshford, where the A1(M) joined the A1. The former A1 north of Walshford became the A168 when the thirteen-mile Walshford to Dishforth section was built by Alfred McAlpine and AMEC, and opened by John Arthur Watts in November 1995. At Allerton Mauleverer with Hopperton it passes under the A59, accessed from a turn to the right which leads to Allerton Castle. Flaxby Golf Club is to the left, near Flaxby. There is a left turn for Arkendale, and right turns for Marton and Grafton. At junction 48 of the A1(M) it meets the A6055 for Knaresborough, to the south-west. The former course of the Great North Road carries straight on through Boroughbridge. The A168 follows the former course of the A1 bypass, next to the current A1(M), to the west of the town. It crosses the River Ure and at Kirby Hill there is a roundabout for the B6265 for Ripon to the west.

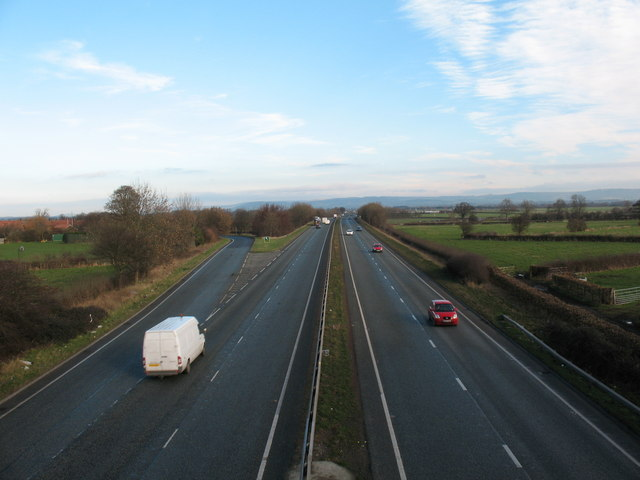
Left turn for Topcliffe, with the North York Moors seen in the distance

It resumes the route of the Great North Road. At the point where it runs parallel to runway of the former RAF Dishforth at Norton-le-Clay, it joins the route of the Roman road Dere Street. The road becomes the parish boundary between Marton-le-Moor and Dishforth. At Dishforth, the road leaves Dere Street and forms part of junction 49 of the A1(M). The A1 junction was planned in the 1970s to be the northern terminus of the A6183, a motorway-standard road that bypassed Leeds to the west from Kirkhamgate, north-west of Wakefield. The scheme was eventually condensed into the A1-M1 motorway link road and the improvement of the A1 to Dishforth. The A168 becomes the main route from the A1 to Teesside, joining the short section of the A168(M), and a trunk road. The former route went through Dishforth, to the south. The South of Topcliffe and Asenby By-pass, including Dishforth by-pass section was built in 1970, connecting with the A1 at the Dishforth Roundabout. At Asenby, the A167 leaves to the left, which is the former route of the A168, and the A168 bypasses Asenby and Topcliffe, crossing the River Swale. The Topcliffe and Asenby By-pass was built in the 1970s, opening in September 1977. There is a left turn for Topcliffe, the A167, also for RAF Topcliffe (which is still operational), and access to the east for Dalton and the former RAF Dalton. RAF Dishforth, Dalton, and Topcliffe were all used by No. 6 Group RCAF during the Second World War. It rejoins the former route. The South of Thirsk By-pass to north of Topcliffe and Asenby By-pass section opened in the late 1960s. In the parish of Topcliffe, there is a left turn for Sowerby, the B1448, the former route of the A168. The road becomes part of the Thirsk bypass, and at Sowerby crosses the East Coast Main Line, then Cod Beck. At Pudding Pie Hill it meets the A170 at a grade-separated junction, where the road continues as the A19 to Teesside. The improvements from the A1 to Thirsk in the late 1960s originally included classifying that section as the A19, not the A168. The Thirsk by-pass opened as the A19 in September 1972.

At Thornbrough, at the northern end of the Thirsk by-pass, the A168 leaves to the left at a grade-separated junction. It crosses the Cod Beck, and there is a left turn for the B1448, the former A168. Thirsk and Northallerton Golf Club is to the left. It passes through Thornton-le-Street. Thornton-le-Moor is to the left. Thornton-le-Beans is to the right. The Vale of Mowbray is to the west. It enters Romanby then Northallerton as Thirsk Road and the northern terminus of the road is with the A167 in the town centre at a roundabout.
