= Jon Lloyd =

Jon Lloyd may refer to:

- Jon Lloyd (businessman)
- Jon Lloyd (microbiologist)
- Jon Lloyd (musician)

== See also ==
- John Lloyd (disambiguation)
