= Andrew Bairstow =

English cricketer (born 1975)

Personal information
- Full name: Andrew David Bairstow
- Born: 16 June 1975 (age 51); Dewsbury, West Yorkshire, England
- Batting: Left-handed
- Role: Wicket-keeper
- Relatives: David Bairstow (father); Jonny Bairstow (half brother)

Domestic team information
- Years: Team
- 1995: Derbyshire

Career statistics
Competition	First-class	List A
Matches	3	1
Runs scored	73	0
Batting average	12.16	0.00
100s/50s	–/–	–/–
Top score	26	0
Catches/stumpings	7/1	3/–
- Source: Cricinfo, 4 July 2022

Andrew Bairstow (born 16 June 1975) is an English former cricketer. He was a left-handed batsman and a wicket-keeper who played first-class cricket for Derbyshire in 1995.

== Career ==
Bairstow started his career within the Worcestershire Second XI, before moving to Derbyshire, and it was a surprise when the Peakites, without the relative experience of Karl Krikken and defensive technique of Steve Griffiths, called upon the young Bairstow as their cover man. Following an inconspicuous First-class career, Bairstow made a few further appearances for the Derbyshire Second XI before leaving the professional game. In total, he played in three first-class matches. He has played club cricket in the Bradford Premier League for Undercliffe, Cleckheaton, East Bierley and Pudsey Congs. He retired from club cricket in 2016.

== Family ==
Bairstow's father, David, was a former Test cricketer for England, and his younger half-brother Jonny is currently a wicket-keeper and batsman for Yorkshire and formerly for England.
