= Jon Lloyd (businessman) =

British business executive

- Born: 10 May 1956 (age 70); West Cheshire, United Kingdom
- Education: Liverpool Polytechnic
- Occupation: Business executive
- Children: 3

Jonathan (Jon) Lloyd (born 10 May 1956 in West Cheshire) is a British business executive who was the Chief Executive of UK Coal between 2007 and 2012.

== Early life ==
His father was a headmaster at the Cheshire Primary School he attended. He attended Chester City Grammar School (since 1091 called the Queens Park High School). He went to Liverpool Polytechnic and studied estate management.

== Career ==
Lloyd was Regional Managing Director for the North Region at DTZ Debenham Thorpe, and held senior roles at Yorkshire Water and was head of property at HBOS.

In May 2006, he became Property Director of UK Coal.

On 1 September 2007, he was made the Chief Executive of UK Coal, under the chairmanship of David Jones. He took over from Gerry Spindler. He left the role in April 2012 after losses at the company and a decline in Britain's biggest coal miner shares.

== Personal life ==
He lives in Marton, Harrogate, in the parish of Marton cum Grafton, and has a son. He is also stepfather to a son and daughter from his wife's first marriage.
