= Hopperton =

Village in North Yorkshire, England

Coordinates: 54.004035°N 1.356434°W

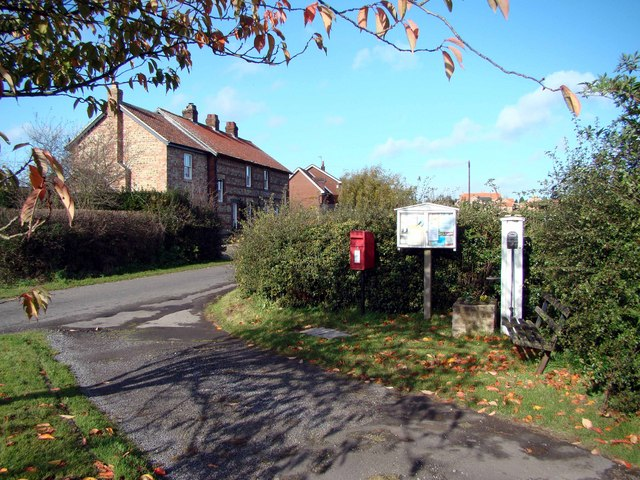
- Hopperton

- Location within North Yorkshire
- OS grid reference: SE422566
- Unitary authority: North Yorkshire
- Ceremonial county: North Yorkshire
- Region: Yorkshire and the Humber
- Country: England
- Sovereign state: United Kingdom
- Post town: KNARESBOROUGH
- Postcode district: HG5
- Police: North Yorkshire
- Fire: North Yorkshire
- Ambulance: Yorkshire
- UK Parliament: Harrogate and Knaresborough

Hopperton is a village in the county of North Yorkshire, England. It is part of the Allerton Mauleverer with Hopperton parish. The village is situated close to the A59, the A1(M) and the A168. Cattal railway station is situated just under two miles from the village with services to Leeds, York and Harrogate. Until 1958, Hopperton had its own railway station next to a level crossing on the original A1 Great North Road. The village had one pub, the Mason Arms, which closed in 2020 and is now a dwelling house . The nearest towns are Knaresborough 4 miles (6.4 km) to the west, and across the county border in West Yorkshire, Wetherby 5 miles (8 km) to the south west. The latter offers the closest large supermarket to Hopperton.

From 1974 to 2023 it was part of the Borough of Harrogate, it is now administered by the unitary North Yorkshire Council.

== See also ==
- Listed buildings in Allerton Mauleverer with Hopperton
