= The Punch Bowl Inn, Marton cum Grafton =

Listed pub in North Yorkshire, England

The Punch Bowl Inn
- The pub in 2024
- Former names: Old Punchbowl

General information
- Type: Public house; originally a house
- Location: Main Street, Marton cum Grafton, North Yorkshire, England
- Coordinates: 54.06082°N 1.36299°W
- Year built: Late 16th century (probable)
- Renovated: Early 18th and 20th century (extended)

Website
- thepunchbowlmartoncumgrafton.com

Listed Building – Grade II
- Official name: Punch Bowl Inn
- Designated: 19 December 1984
- Reference no.: 1257289

The Punch Bowl Inn is a historic public house on Main Street in Marton cum Grafton, a village in North Yorkshire, England.

The building is thought to have originally been constructed in the late 16th century, probably as a two-bay house; this oldest section is timber framed. In the 18th century it was greatly extended and converted into a coaching inn. In the 20th century, it was extended to the rear and to the right. In the 1950s and 1960s, it operated as a roadhouse near the Great North Road, and had a motoring theme. The building was Grade II listed in 1984. In the 2010s, the pub was owned by Neil Morrissey, and during this period it appeared in a Channel 4 programme. It was purchased by Provenance Inns in 2017, and in 2022 it won Best Food Offer at the Publican Awards. As of June 2026, the freehold is independently owned.

The pub is rendered, and has a pantile roof. The original part has a timber-framed core and a high plinth. There are two storeys and three bays. The doorway has an architrave and an oblong fanlight, the windows are sashes, those on the upper floor horizontally-sliding, and on the roof is a modern dormer.

== See also ==
- Listed buildings in Marton cum Grafton
