= Allerton Waste Recovery Park =

Waste recovery and incineration plant in North Yorkshire, England

Allerton waste recovery park
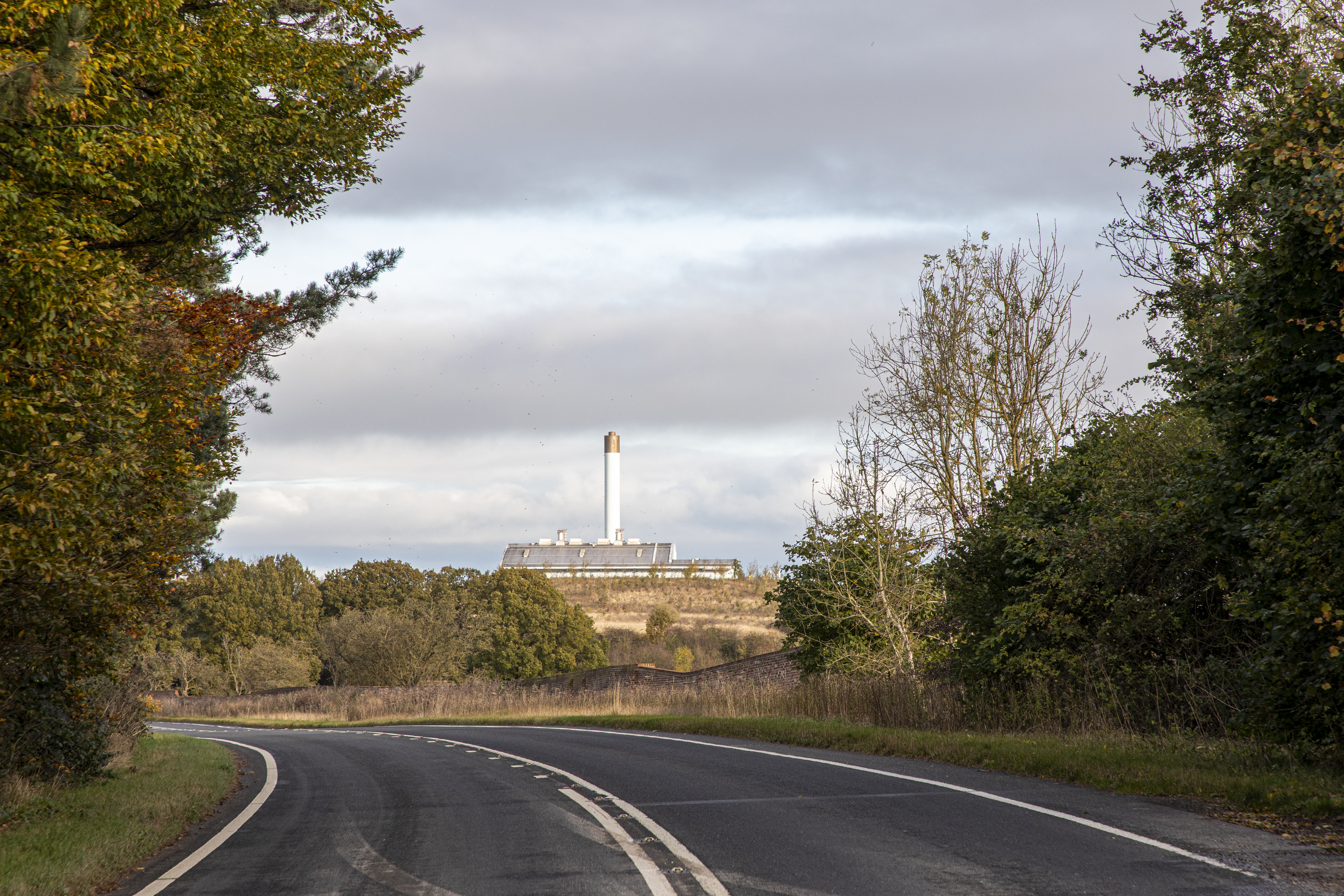
- The incinerator at Allerton Mauleverer
- Country: England
- Location: Allerton Mauleverer
- Coordinates: 54.0330°N 1.3813°W
- Status: Operational
- Construction began: 2015
- Commission date: 2018
- Owners: North Yorkshire Council; York City Council
- Operator: AmeyCespa

Thermal power station
- Primary fuel: Waste

Power generation
- Annual net output: 218 GWh

External links
- Website: Official website

Allerton Waste Recovery Park is a waste recovery and incineration site located on a former quarry at Allerton Mauleverer, near Knaresborough, England. It is operated by AmeyCespa on behalf of North Yorkshire Council and City of York Council, the site is capable of handling 320,000 tonnes (350,000 tons) of household waste per year.

The site is expected to cost £1.4 billion over 25 years, but is estimated it that the cost of not incinerating over the same time period would be £1.7 billion in landfill and other costs.

Despite being labelled as just an incinerator, it also recycles and uses biodegradable waste to generate biogas, which is why it is known as a waste recovery park. The site is just off the A168, 4 miles (6.4 km) east of Knaresborough and 7 miles (11 km) north of Wetherby.

== History ==
A suitable location to burn the waste from both the City of York and the county of North Yorkshire had been underway since the mid 2000s. A site on Marston Business Park near Tockwith was considered before the site at Allerton Mauleverer was decided upon.

The project proved controversial with those in the area and MPs, and a 10,000 signature petition against the plant promoted a legal challenge and the submission of the petition to No. 10 Downing Street. North Yorkshire County Council approved the plan in October 2012, with final approval granted in September 2014, even after the UK government announced that it was withdrawing £65 million worth of funding. The funding had been part of an EU directive on landfill diversion targets, however, 29 other projects under consideration or approval were found to have been sufficient to fulfil the directive.

A disused part of the Allerton Park Quarry was used to locate the plant on, with 55,000 tonnes (61,000 tons) of earth excavated out to form the waste banks beneath the plant. The quarry used to produce sand and gravel, and had also been used as a landfill site, with permission to carry on with landfilling until 2030. The main plant is built at the bottom of part of the former quarry, which is why the chimney does not seem as tall as its 230-foot (70 m) height. However, the plant is very noticeable in the landscape, especially from the A1(M) motorway and the adjacent A168 road. The construction of the plant was undertaken by Taylor Woodrow Construction.

The site is expected to cost £1.4 billion to run over its estimated 25-year lifespan. Critics have pointed out the high cost of the scheme, whereas both York City and North Yorkshire County Councils have stated that the project will deliver £300 million worth of savings over the 25-year time period as incineration is cheaper than a landfill option.

== Process ==
The plant can handle up to 1,400 tonnes (1,500 tons) of waste per day. The process first filters out recyclable material, such as plastic and metals, before all the bio-degradable material is removed, which is sent to an anaerobic digester and turned into biogas. The remaining waste is burnt in the incinerator, which is estimated to create over 218 GWh in a year; this is enough electricity to power between 40,000 and 60,000 homes. However, up to 10% of the waste or residue cannot be processed and is still sent to landfill (32,000 tonnes (35,000 tons).

The site will export over 74,000 tonnes (82,000 tons) of ash per year, which will be sold on to construction projects. A visitor centre is also located on site to allow people to see the plant in action.

The facility was designed with the option of adapting it into a combined heat and power generator. A project to build over 2,500 homes at Flaxby Park, on the opposite side of the A1(M), has registered an interest in taking the steam from the site to heat the new homes.
