= St Bartholomew's Church, Arkendale =

Church in North Yorkshire, England

Coordinates: 54.0436°N 1.4078°W

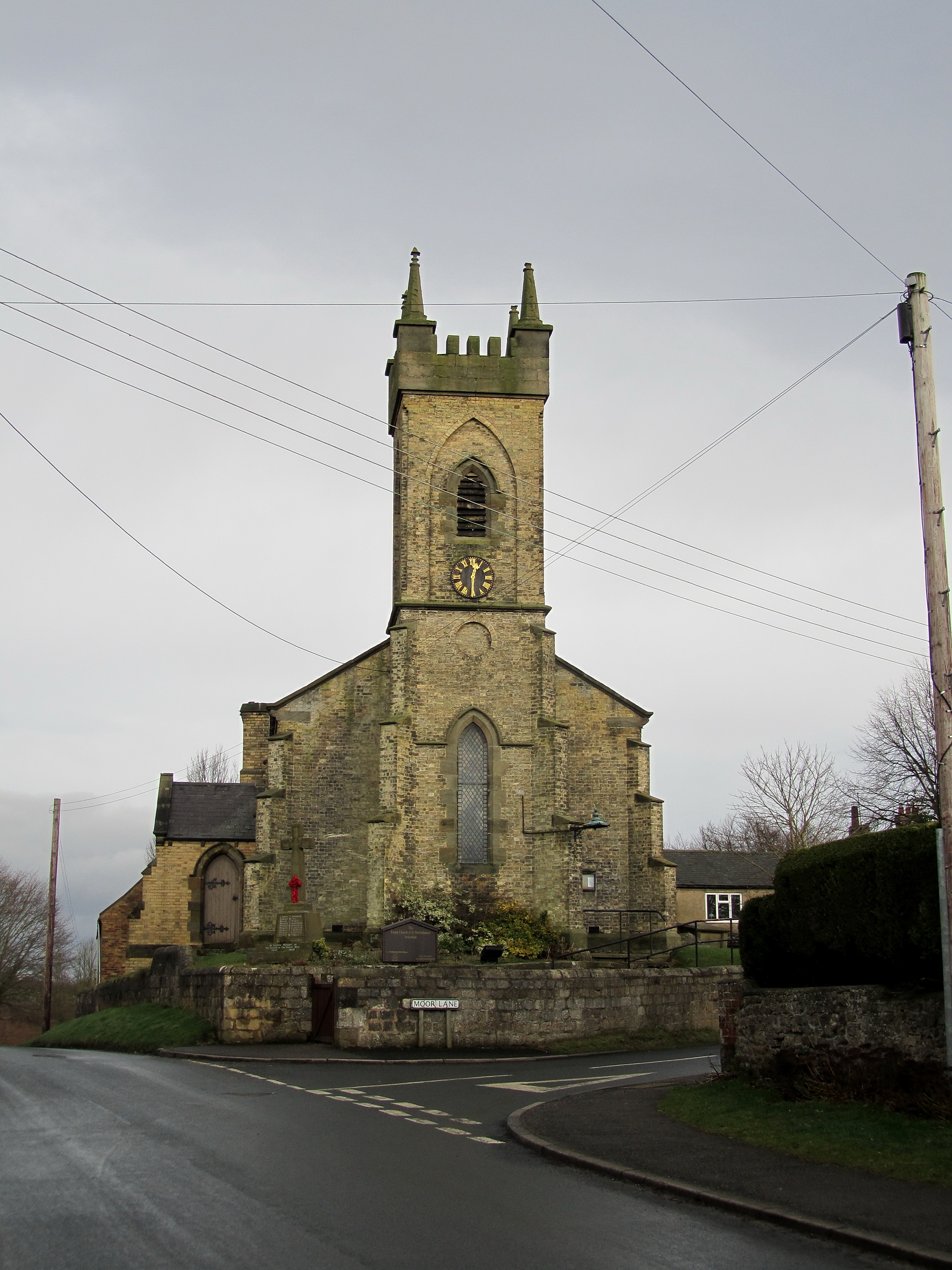
The church, in 2013

St Bartholomew's Church is an Anglican church in Arkendale, a village in North Yorkshire, in England.

A church in the village was first recorded in the 14th century. It was demolished in 1836 and rebuilt at a cost of £500, to a design by John Freeman. It was consecrated in January 1837, the first new church in the recently created Diocese of Ripon. The church is in the Early English style and is built of white brick. It has a square stone tower which projects at the west end and has battlements. The church originally seated 210 worshippers. The Victorian church clock was restored in 2023.

Nikolaus Pevsner describes the church as "uncommonly unattractive". It is not a listed building.
