= John Robert Lunn =

The Revd. John Robert Lunn (8 March 1831 – 1899) was an organist and clergyman based in England.

== Life ==
He was born on 8 March 1831 at Cleeve Prior, Worcestershire. He received music lessons from age 4 in organ under George Hollins and piano from W. H. Sharman.

He was educated at King Edward VI School and was appointed organist of Edgbaston Parish Church age 15.

He went up to Cambridge University in 1849. He graduated B.A. (fourth wrangler) 1853; M.A., 1856. He was ordained Deacon in the Church of England, 1855, and priest in 1856.

He was Fellow, and Sadlerian Lecturer, St. John's College, Cambridge and President of the University Musical Society

He was appointed vicar of Christ Church, Marton cum Grafton, Yorkshire in 1863.

== Appointments ==
- Organist of St Bartholomew's Church, Edgbaston Birmingham 1846–47
- Vicar of Marton-cum-Grafton 1863–99

== Compositions ==
His compositions include:

- Oratorio, St. Paulinus of York 1892
- Two Motets, for two choirs and organ
- Motet, Heaven is my throne, eight-part chorus (MS.)
- Communion Service in E, King's Chapel, Cambridge, 1 November 1861.
- Te Deum and Benedictus in E, for two choirs and organ, Cambridge, 1862.
- Priest's part for Aylward's Responses
- Hymn tunes, etc.
- Arrangements for pianoforte 4 hands and harmonium, of Bennett's Woman of Samaria, and other works
