= Mark Johnson (Yorkshire cricketer) =

English cricketer (born 1958)

Mark Johnson (born 23 April 1958, Gleadless, Sheffield, Yorkshire, England) is a former English first-class cricketer, who played four first-class matches for Yorkshire County Cricket Club in 1981. A right arm fast bowler and right-handed batsman, he took seven wickets at an average of 43.00, with a best return of 4 for 48 against Warwickshire. He played fourteen one day games, taking twelve wickets at 37.91, with a best of 4 for 18 against Scotland. He played for Derbyshire Second XI in 1980, before appearing for the Yorkshire Second XI in 1981. However, injury cut short his professional career. He featured in a record unbeaten last wicket Benson & Hedges Cup stand of 81 with David Bairstow in 1981 versus Derbyshire, on his debut. His most notable victim was bowling out Viv Richards. Johnson is currently playing for the Yorkshire Over 50s side.

He also played in the Sheffield Polytechnic side that won the British Polytechnics Cup in 1976 at Edgbaston, were runners up the next year at the same venue and won the national competition for a second time in 1978 at the Richmond CC ground.
