= Christ Church, Marton cum Grafton =

Church in Marton cum Grafton, North Yorkshire, England

Coordinates: 54.0588°N 1.3628°W

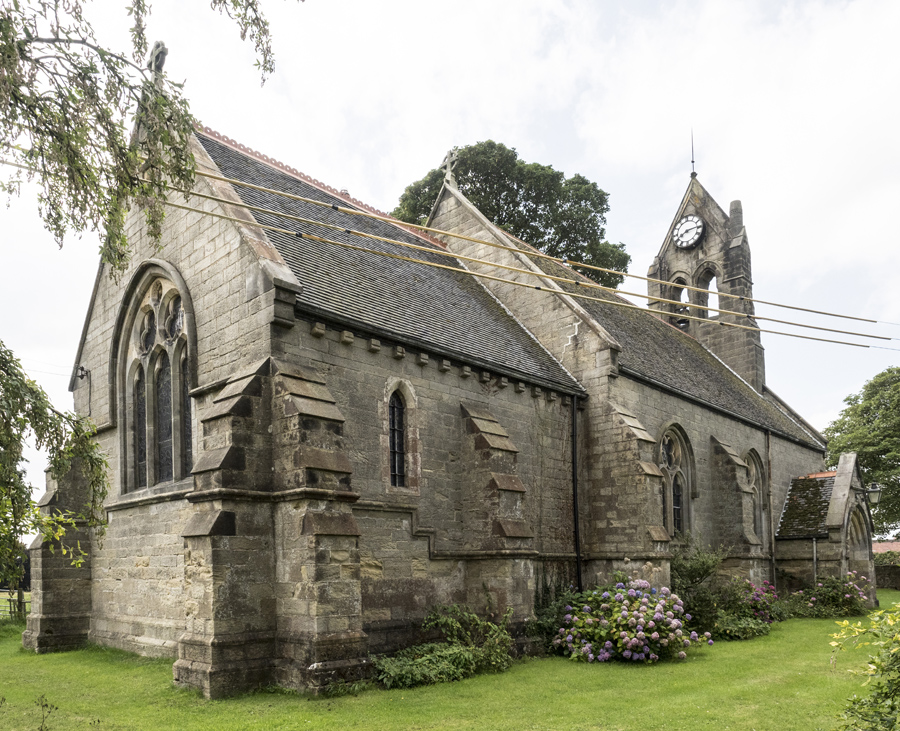
The church, in 2018

Christ Church is the parish church of Marton cum Grafton, a village in North Yorkshire, in England.

A church was built in the village in the 12th century, and partly rebuilt some time after 1318. In 1848, it was described as "in the early English style, with a square embattled tower". It was demolished in the late 19th century, and a new church was constructed on a different site, but reusing most of the materials. It was designed by John Ladds again in the Early English style, and was consecrated in 1876. At the time, its vicar was the well-known musician John Robert Lunn, and Schubert's Mass No. 1 was performed at the consecration, claimed at the time to be its first performance in an Anglican church. The church was grade II listed in 1984.

It is built in sandstone with a Welsh slate roof, and consists of a nave, a north porch, and a chancel with a south vestry. On the west gable is an open double bellcote. The north doorway incorporates a Norman doorhead, with a tympanum containing a cross in a roundel. Inside the church is a re-set Norman doorway with three orders of shafts. The window heads in the vestry are 14th century, as is the font, while one bell is believed to be 12th century.

== See also ==
- Listed buildings in Marton cum Grafton
