= Allerton Mauleverer with Hopperton =

Civil parish in North Yorkshire, England

Coordinates: 54.011°N 1.362°W

- Civil parish
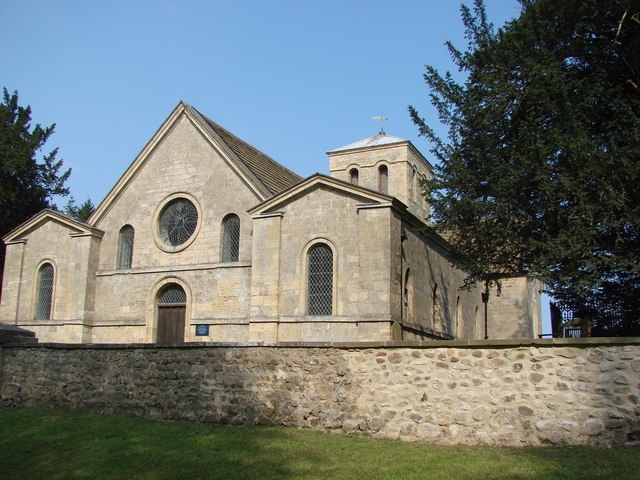
- St Martin's Church, Allerton Mauleverer. This church is now disused and in the care of the Churches Conservation Trust.

- Location within North Yorkshire
- Population: 150 (2011 Census)
- Unitary authority: North Yorkshire
- Ceremonial county: North Yorkshire
- Region: Yorkshire and the Humber
- Country: England
- Sovereign state: United Kingdom
- Police: North Yorkshire
- Fire: North Yorkshire
- Ambulance: Yorkshire

Allerton Mauleverer with Hopperton is a civil parish in North Yorkshire, England. At the 2011 Census, the parish had a population of 150, an increase from 130 at the 2001 Census.

As its name suggests, the parish includes the villages of Allerton Mauleverer and Hopperton.

From 1974 to 2023 it was part of the Selby District, it is now administered by the unitary North Yorkshire Council.

It is in the ecclesiastical parish of Whixley with Green Hammerton, in the Diocese of Leeds.

== See also ==
- Listed buildings in Allerton Mauleverer with Hopperton
