= Listed buildings in Allerton Mauleverer with Hopperton =

Allerton Mauleverer with Hopperton is a civil parish in the county of North Yorkshire, England. It contains 21 listed buildings that are recorded in the National Heritage List for England. Of these, one is listed at Grade I, the highest of the three grades, two are at Grade II*, the middle grade, and the others are at Grade II, the lowest grade. The parish contains the villages of Allerton Mauleverer and Hopperton and the surrounding area. The most important building in the parish is Allerton Park, which is listed, together with associated structures and buildings in the surrounding parkland. The other listed buildings include a church and associated structures, a chapel, cottages and lodges.

== Key ==
Grade	Criteria
I	Buildings of exceptional interest, sometimes considered to be internationally important
II*	Particularly important buildings of more than special interest
II	Buildings of national importance and special interest

== Buildings ==
Name and location	Photograph	Date	Notes	Grade
St Martin's Church, Allerton Mauleverer; 54.01597°N 1.36684°W		c. 1745	The church is built in limestone with roofs of stone slate and corrugated sheet, and is in Norman style. It has a cruciform plan, consisting of a six-bay nave, north and south aisles, north and south transepts, a two-bay chancel, and a tower over the west bay of the chancel. The east window has five lights and is in Perpendicular style, there is a circular window at the west end, and the other windows have round-arched heads. The tower has three stages, round-arched bell openings, and a pyramidal roof with a weathervane.	II*
Churchyard wall and piers, St Martin's Church, Allerton Mauleverer; 54.01611°N 1.36628°W		c. 1745	The wall enclosing the churchyard on the west, north and east sides is in cobbles set in mortar with stone coping, and is about 1.2 metres (3 ft 11 in) high. In the centre and corner of the west wall are square stone piers, about 1.5 metres (4 ft 11 in) high, with banded, shallow-pointed caps.	II
Bridge over path to Pleasure Grounds; 54.01783°N 1.36790°W	—	Mid to late 18th century	The bridge, which carries a road over a footpath, is in stone and red brick. It consists of a round arch with an impost band, and a large keystone, above which is a coped parapet. The flanking walls are coped, they curve and are stepped, and end in low square piers.	II
Walled Garden; 54.01353°N 1.37287°W	—	c. 1770	The rectangular kitchen garden is enclosed by walls in red brick, with stone dressings, buttresses and stone coping. On the east side is a gateway with stone gate piers and iron gates. Attached to the north wall are two ranges of later lean-to potting and storage sheds.	II
Dovecote; 54.01749°N 1.36797°W	—	Late 18th century	The dovecote is in a range of farm buildings, in red brick with a hipped slate roof, and a single storey. The openings include a round-headed carriage arch linked to the stables, a pair of carriage doors, and various windows. On the roof is a square wooden lantern with three rows of flight openings, and inside are three rows of flight boxes in five tiers, in terracotta, each with a round-arched entrance and a flight perch.	II
Summerhouse and archway 54.01757°N 1.36829°W	—	Late 18th century	The summerhouse is in stone with a tile roof, and to the south is a brick wall and an archway. It has a single storey, and a rear wall of eleven bays with blind arches and impost bands surmounted by battlements and square pinnacles. The middle five bays are splayed forwards, and three of the bays have round-headed arches. In front is an openwork trellis with wooden posts carrying the roof and surmounted by ball finials. The brick wall has stone dressings and contains a doorway in a round arch, within a wider and taller arch with a triangular pediment and ramped walls.	II
The Stables; 54.01706°N 1.36793°W		Late 18th century	The stable block, later converted into flats, is in stuccoed brick with slate roofs, and consists of four ranges round a courtyard. The main entrance is in the south range, which has a central pavilion flanked by single-storey two-bay wings and taller end pavilions. In the centre is a large arch with impost bands, round-arched sash windows and circular windows in the spandrels, above which is a shallow open pediment. The wings contain sash windows, and in the end pavilions are blind arches containing sash windows with circular windows above. The side ranges have hipped roofs.	II
Arched entrance, Lower Fish Pond; 54.01919°N 1.36632°W	—	Late 18th to early 19th century	At the entrance to the boathouse or jetty is a gritstone wall pierced by a wide round-headed coped arch.	II
Boathouse, Lower Fish Pond; 54.02092°N 1.36668°W	—	Late 18th to early 19th century	The boathouse is in gritstone, and has a coped arched opening.	II
Bridge between Middle and Lower Fish Pond; 54.02067°N 1.36910°W	—	Late 18th to early 19th century	The footbridge is in stone and brick. It consists of a central round-headed arch with smaller flanking arches. The outer faces of the parapet walls are of large boulders, they are coped with large stone blocks, and the inner faces are of red brick.	II
Folly north of Middle Fish Pond; 54.02358°N 1.37358°W	—	Late 18th to early 19th century	The folly is in red brick and limestone and has a stone slate roof. There is a single storey and three bays. In the centre of the southeast front is a round-arched opening flanked by pairs of round-arched niches, all with rusticated voussoirs. There are three bands, and an entablature of alternating rusticated panels and cast iron balusters.	II
Holly Cottage; 54.00977°N 1.36025°W	—	Late 18th to early 19th century	A cottage ornée, it is rendered, with quoins, a stone slate roof, and gables with ornate cusped bargeboards. In the centre is a gabled porch with cusped bargeboards, and a doorway with a shallow pointed arch and a fluted shell motif in the upper part. This is flanked by canted bay windows with hipped roofs, in the left return is a cross window, and the attics contain small windows.	II
West Lodge; 54.01715°N 1.37964°W	—	Late 18th to early 19th century	A cottage ornée, it is in pebbledashed red brick with a stone slate roof. There is a single storey, and it is five-sided, with an additional bay at the rear. On the north side is a porch on four wooden posts, and the windows are cross windows.	II
Gates and gate piers, West Lodge; 54.01736°N 1.37980°W		Late 18th to early 19th century	Flanking the entrance to the park are square stone gate piers about 3 metres (9.8 ft) high, each with a moulded cornice and a pyramidal cap. The gates are in wrought iron, about 2 metres (6 ft 7 in) high, with foliated tops.	II
St Mary's Chapel; 54.01693°N 1.36962°W	—	c. 1807	The chapel, to the east of Allerton Park, is in brown and cream brick, partly rendered, and has a Westmorland slate roof. There is a cruciform plan, consisting of a three-bay nave, single-bay transepts, and a single-bay chancel, and the entrance is from the house. The windows are lancets with sashes, and at the east end are three blind lancet arches with a circular panel above. The gable is coped, and surmounted by a cross.	II*
Ice house 54.01958°N 1.36987°W	—	Early 19th century	The ice house is in gritstone and brick, and consists of a large mound with a retaining wall of boulders with stone coping. In the centre is a segmental-headed doorway leading to a narrow brick-lined passage and a flight of five steps to a deep circular brick-lined pit with domed roof.	II
Terrace walls, steps and urns, Allerton Park; 54.01752°N 1.37105°W	—	c. 1845	The terrace walls are in gritstone. There are two terraces, the main one to the north and west of the house, and the other lower and further to the north. At the northeast corner of the main terrace, the wall is in the form of a tower with battlements and turrets with conical caps. At the east end of the north terrace is a flight of steps with turrets and side walls. On the lower lawn are three pairs of large segmental stone urns on square bases, flanking short flights of steps to the lowest lawn.	II
Allerton Park; 54.01709°N 1.37042°W		1848–51	A large house in gritstone with roofs of grey slate and lead. It is in two and three storeys, and has an irregular plan. On the south front is a porte-cochère with a tower above. The other features include polygonal turrets, embattled parapets, pinnacles and shaped gables. There is a two-storey bow window, and square bay windows.	I
South Lodge and gate 54.01467°N 1.36730°W	—	c. 1850	The lodge is in stone, with quoins, and a stone slate roof with overhanging eaves and ornate bargeboards. There is a single storey and an irregular cruciform plan. On the front is a lean-to porch, and the windows are cross-casements. Attached to the southeast corner is a wooden gate flanked by octagonal stone gate piers with pyramidal caps. On each side are coped walls, and to the right is a pier with an iron letter-box.	II
Gate piers and gate southeast of Allerton Park; 54.01666°N 1.37014°W	—	Late 19th century	The gate and gate piers are in wrought iron. The piers have a square section and an openwork design including St Andrew's crosses and geometric panels, and shallow pyramidal caps. The gate also has St Andrew's crosses, and roundels in the form of a rose, and on the top are two decorative scrolls.	II
Gate piers and gate southwest of Allerton Park; 54.01691°N 1.37157°W	—	Late 19th century	The gate and gate piers are in wrought iron. The piers have an openwork design including St Andrew's crosses and geometric panels, and shallow pyramidal caps. The gate also has St Andrew's crosses, and roundels in the form of a rose, and on the top are two decorative scrolls.	II
