= Marton cum Grafton =

Civil parish in North Yorkshire, England

Coordinates: 54.061°N 1.367°W

- Civil parish
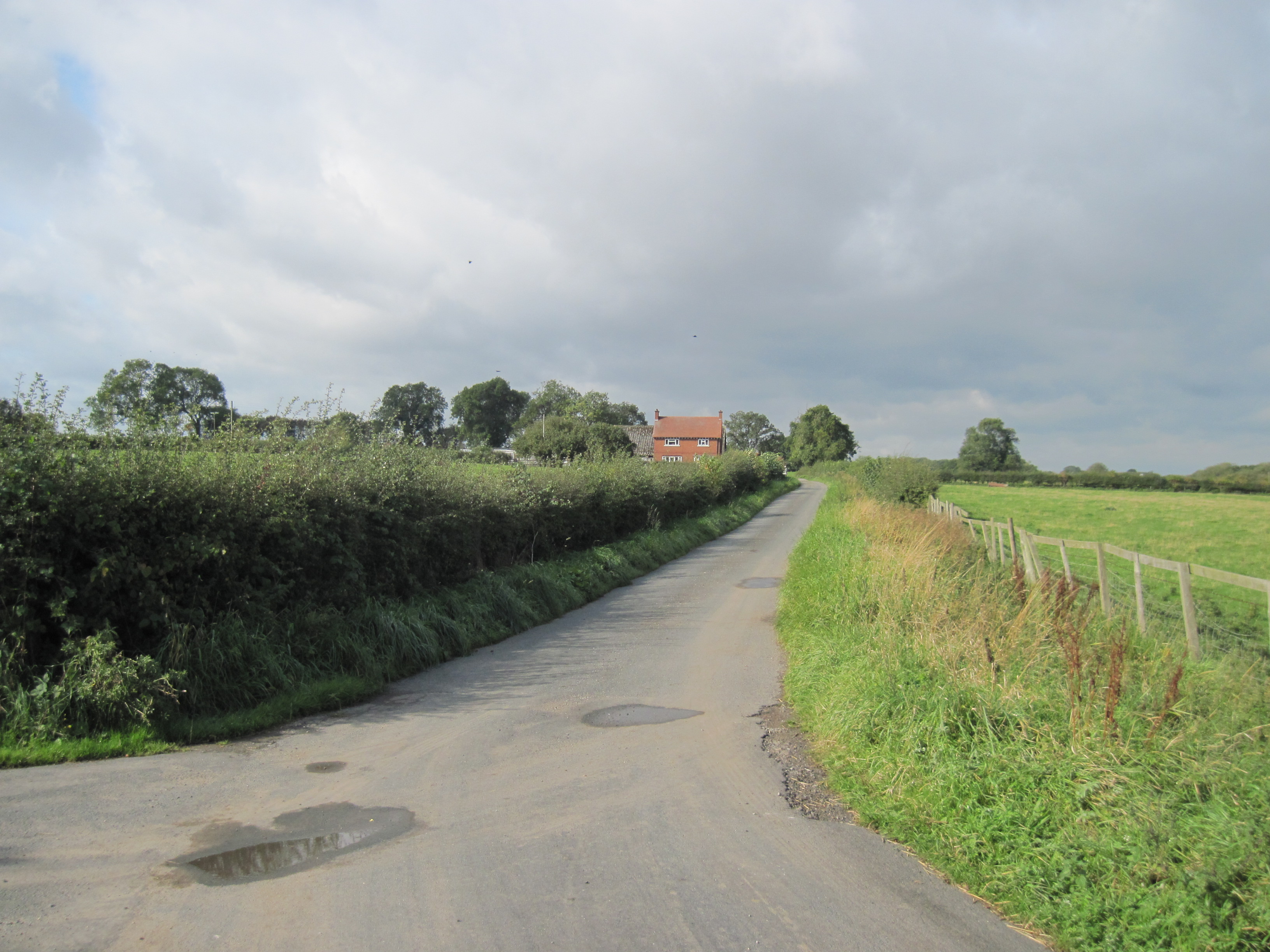
- Farm Road to Priestcar Lodge Farm

- Location within North Yorkshire
- Population: 510 (2015)
- OS grid reference: SE416633
- Unitary authority: North Yorkshire
- Ceremonial county: North Yorkshire
- Region: Yorkshire and the Humber
- Country: England
- Sovereign state: United Kingdom
- Post town: YORK
- Postcode district: YO51
- Police: North Yorkshire
- Fire: North Yorkshire
- Ambulance: Yorkshire
- UK Parliament: Harrogate and Knaresborough Constituency

Marton cum Grafton is a civil parish in the county of North Yorkshire, England. The parish has only two settlements (Marton and Grafton), and has a magnesian limestone and sandstone geography, which has been used for quarrying. The landform is broadly flat, though there are some small hills with the Marton and Grafton being separated by 98 feet (30 m) despite being only 0.5 miles (0.8 km) apart.

== History ==
Archaeological evidence shows that just to the south of Grafton there was an Iron Age fort. However, quarrying and the installation of allotments and modern day structures, led to the site being de-scheduled as an ancient monument. In 1835, the population was 482, which had risen to 499 by 1851. However, by 1901, the population was at 299, and saw a rise of 50 people to 349 by 1911. At the 2001 census, the parish had a population of 516 which had dropped to 503 by the 2011 Census. In 2015, North Yorkshire County Council, estimated the population of the parish to be 510. In 1872, the parish covered an area of 1,198 acres (485 ha), and in 1901, covered 2,167 acres (877 ha), but at the 2011 Census, it was 2,470 acres (998 hectares).

The parish is connected to York and Boroughbridge by bus. The modern parish has the B6265, Boroughbridge to Kirk Hammerton road in the east (the route of Dere Street), and the western border is the A168 road, adjacent to the A1(M) (the old Great North Road).

The two settlements of Grafton and Marton are contiguous, and since 1979, they have been formed into one conservation area. Besides agriculture, the other major source of employment in the area has been quarrying, with gravel pits still in evidence across the parish. The former Allerton Park Quarry, now the Allerton waste recovery park, was historically in the township of Marton. The geology of the parish is largely of a magnesian limestone ridge, with Sherwood sandstone to the east of the ridge. The earth has been described as being "slightly acid loamy, and clayey soils, with impeded drainage." The land is capped with sands and gravels, which has led to large-scale quarries in the parish. The land is fairly flat given over to agriculture, but the parish has some hills; despite being only 0.5 miles (0.8 km) apart, Grafton is 125 feet (38 m) above sea level, whereas Marton is 202 feet (61.7 m).

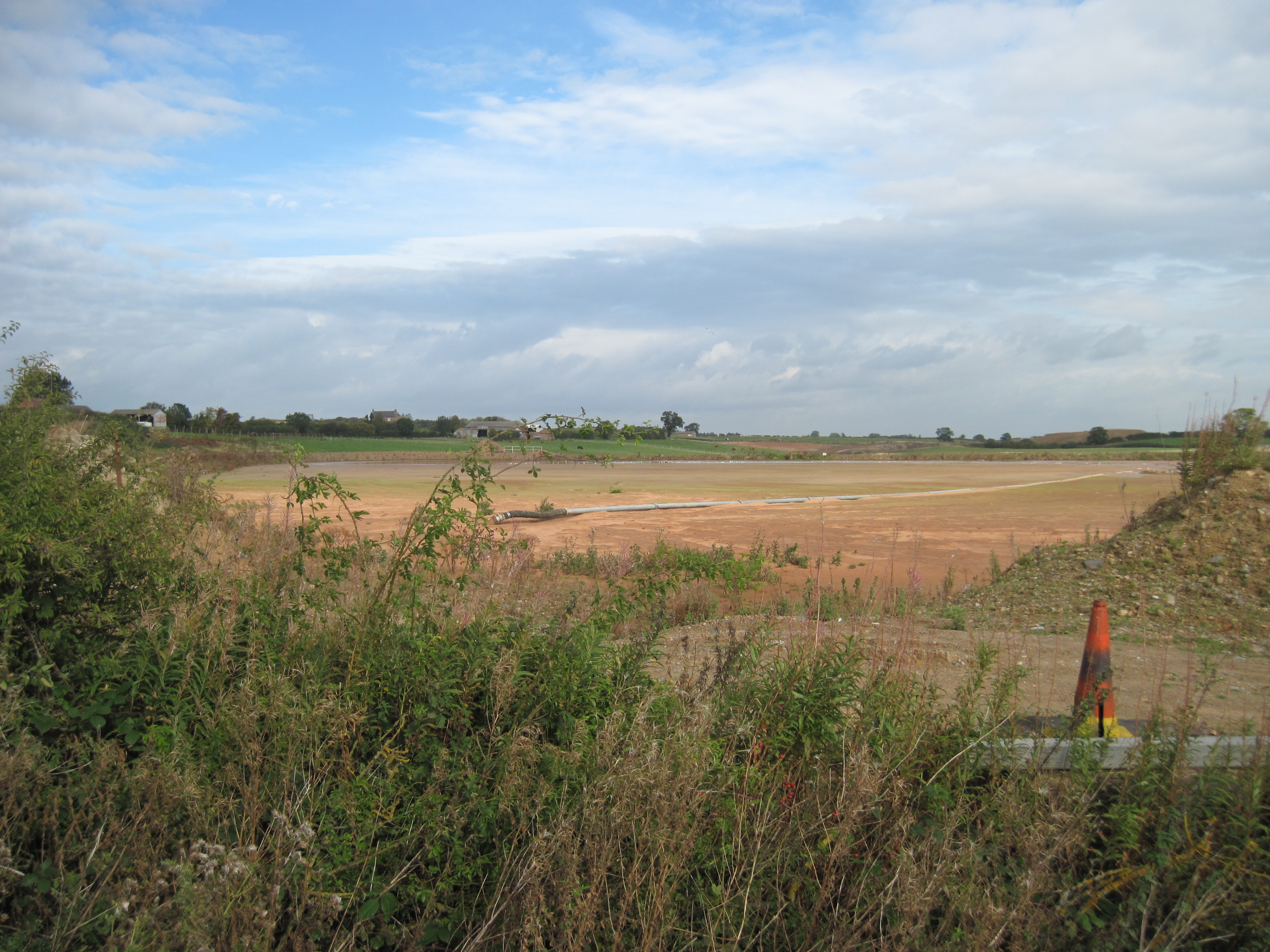
Quarry in the parish

The original church in the parish was located some 0.5 miles (0.8 km) south of the village of Marton. It was built in the 12th century and repaired after being sacked by the Scottish in 1318. It again fell into disrepair (c. 1540), until being rebuilt in 17th and 18th centuries. It was given after the Dissolution to St John's College in Cambridge, and its dedication was unknown, but after 1692, it is thought to have been the Church of St John after is benefactors, in the College of St John. Until it closed, the church was a prebendal peculier in the Deanery of Boroughbridge and the Diocese of Chester. In 1876, the new Christ Church, Marton cum Grafton, was built with stones from the former ruined church; Pevsner states the doorway re-erected inside the church is Norman. This structure is now grade II listed.

For a survey of burials in the churchyard see 'External links' below.

Population of Marton cum Grafton 1801–2015
1801	1811	1821	1831	1841	1851	1861	1871	1881	1891	1901	1911	1921	1931	1951	1961	2001	2011	2015
393	384	464	482	514	472	454	424	365	320	298	349	361	321	362	344	516	503	510

== Governance ==
Historically, the ecclesiastical parish was known as Marton-in-Burghshire (or Marton-in-Burgheshire). Sometimes the parish name is spelled with hypens (Marton-cum-Grafton). The parish was formerly in the Great Ouseburn Rural District, in the wapentake of Claro, in the West Riding of Yorkshire; but since the 1974 boundary changes, it has been in North Yorkshire. From 1974 to 2023 it was part of the Borough of Harrogate, it is now administered by the unitary North Yorkshire Council.

It is in the Harrogate and Knaresborough Constituency.

== Notable people ==
- David Bairstow, cricketer and footballer, lived in the parish

== See also ==
- Listed buildings in Marton cum Grafton
