= Listed buildings in North Deighton =

North Deighton is a civil parish in the county of North Yorkshire, England. It contains seven listed buildings that are recorded in the National Heritage List for England. All the listed buildings are designated at Grade II, the lowest of the three grades, which is applied to "buildings of national importance and special interest". The parish contains the village of North Deighton and the surrounding area, and the listed buildings consist of houses, associated structures, and a farmhouse.

== Buildings ==
Name and location	Photograph	Date	Notes
Old Hall; 53.95953°N 1.40895°W	—	17th century	The house is in limestone on a plinth, with a projecting floor band and a stone slate roof. There are two storeys and seven unequal bays. On the front is a porch, and the windows on the front are sashes in architraves. At the rear are a stair window, and the remains of mullioned windows.
Outbuilding east of the Old Hall; 53.95952°N 1.40866°W	—	17th century	A house, later used for other purposes, in limestone on a deep chamfered plinth, with a stone slate roof and stone coped gables. There are two storeys and five bays. On the ground floor are five four-centred arches, some with doorways. The windows are mullioned, with some mullions missing. On the left return are external steps leading to an upper floor doorway, and in the right return are rectangular recesses.
Dovecote west of the Old Hall; 53.95941°N 1.40934°W	—	18th century (probable)	The dovecote is in limestone on a plinth, with a pyramidal stone slate roof and the remains of a lantern. It has a square plan with sides of about 6 metres (20 ft), and one storey. There is a doorway on the east side.
Piers and walls, The Manor; 53.95948°N 1.40645°W	—	Late 18th century (probable)	The gate piers flanking the entrance to the drive are in rusticated stone, and have a moulded cornice and a ball and cushion finial. The walls are in gritstone on a plinth, and are about 2 metres (6 ft 7 in) high and 15 metres (49 ft) long. They are curving, they have slightly projecting flat coping, and end in piers with shallow pyramidal caps.
Dovecote Farmhouse; 53.95922°N 1.40461°W	—	Early 19th century	The farmhouse is in grey limestone, and has a stone slate roof with coped gables and shaped kneelers. There are two storeys, and fronts of three and two bays. The central doorway has pilasters, an entablature, a cornice and a fanlight, and the windows are sashes in architraves.
The Manor; 53.95999°N 1.40694°W	—	Early to mid-19th century	The house is rendered and has a hipped purple slate roof. There are two storeys, a front of three bays, the middle bay projecting slightly, two bays on the sides, and a rear wing. In the centre is a Tuscan porch and a doorway with a fanlight. The windows are sashes, and in the left and right returns are French windows.
Water pump near the Old Hall; 53.95962°N 1.40888°W	—	1836	The water pump is in lead, iron and wood, and is about 1.2 metres (3 ft 11 in) tall. The handle is on the west side, the spout is on the north side, and under the spout is an initialled and dated plaque.
