= North Deighton =

Village and civil parish in North Yorkshire, England

Coordinates: 53.95940°N 1.40601°W

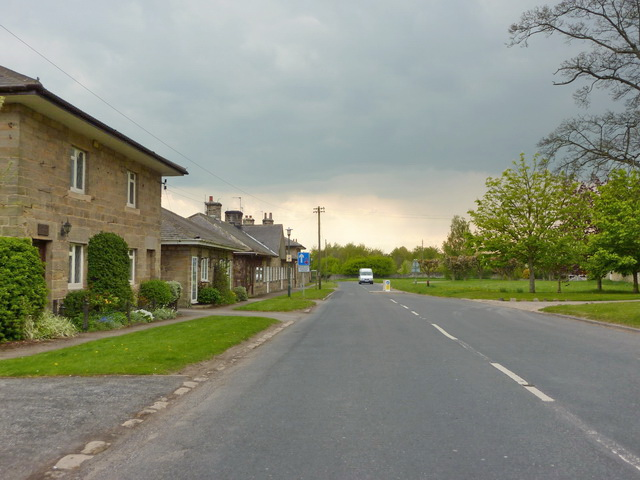
- The Green

- Location within North Yorkshire
- Population: 80
- OS grid reference: SE390516
- Civil parish: North Deighton
- Unitary authority: North Yorkshire
- Ceremonial county: North Yorkshire
- Region: Yorkshire and the Humber
- Country: England
- Sovereign state: United Kingdom
- Post town: WETHERBY
- Postcode district: LS22
- Police: North Yorkshire
- Fire: North Yorkshire
- Ambulance: Yorkshire

North Deighton is a village and civil parish in the county of North Yorkshire, England. It is near the A1(M) motorway and the A168 road and is 1.9 miles (3 km) north-west of Wetherby. The B6164 road runs through the village between Knaresborough and Wetherby with a minor road heading south-west towards Spofforth.

The population of the civil parish was estimated by North Yorkshire County Council at 80 in 2014.

== History ==
Along with neighbouring Kirk Deighton, the village is mentioned in the Domesday Book. Its name derives from a mixture of Old English and Old Norse—Kirkja dīc tūn which means a church, a defensive trench or ditch and a farmstead or village.

Until 1866, when the civil parish was formed, the village was part of the parish of Kirk Deighton. Until 1974 it was part of the West Riding of Yorkshire. From 1974 to 2023 it was part of the Borough of Harrogate. It is now administered by the unitary North Yorkshire Council.

To the east of the village is Howe Hill, which is a former Motte-and-bailey castle from around the time of the Norman Conquest. It is also thought to be one of the burial sites of dead soldiers from the Battle of Marston Moor. The area was formerly part of the Royal Forest of Knaresborough (a medieval hunting park) and also part of the Ribston Estate.

== See also ==
- Listed buildings in North Deighton
