= David Bairstow =

English cricketer and footballer

Personal information
- Full name: David Leslie Bairstow
- Born: 1 September 1951; Bradford, West Riding of Yorkshire, England
- Died: 5 January 1998 (aged 46); Marton-cum-Grafton, North Yorkshire, England
- Nickname: Bluey
- Batting: Right-handed
- Bowling: Right-arm medium
- Role: Wicket-keeper
- Relatives: Jonny Bairstow (son); Andrew Bairstow (son)

Career statistics
Competition	Test	ODI	FC	LA
Matches	4	21	459	429
Runs scored	125	206	13,961	5,439
Batting average	20.83	14.71	26.44	20.68
100s/50s	0/1	0/0	10/73	1/19
Top score	59	23*	145	103*
Balls bowled	–	–	582	18
Wickets	–	–	9	0
Bowling average	–	–	34.22	–
5 wickets in innings	–	–	0	–
10 wickets in match	–	–	0	–
Best bowling	–	–	3/25	–
Catches/stumpings	12/1	17/4	961/138	411/36
- Source: ESPNcricinfo, 28 July 2013

David Leslie Bairstow (1 September 1951 – 5 January 1998) was an English cricketer, who played for Yorkshire and England as a wicket-keeper. He also played football for his hometown club Bradford City. He is the father of England international cricketer Jonny Bairstow.

== Early life and education ==
Born in Bradford, Yorkshire, Bairstow excelled at school in several sports, and he played football several times for Bradford City, but eventually he settled on cricket, and played his first county match against Gloucestershire in 1970 after taking an A-level at 6am to play.

== Career ==
He played for Yorkshire throughout his career, and captained the club from 1984 to 1986, though this was a far from happy period. Nicknamed "Bluey" on account of his red hair, influential for his aggression on the field and for his playing statistics. He was particularly well loved by the Yorkshire crowds for his ability to turn round limited over games by his late-order swinging of the bat. In 459 first-class cricket matches he scored 13,961 runs at an average of 26.44 with a highest score of 145. He snared 961 catches and 137 stumpings and perhaps stands second only to Jimmy Binks in the annals of Yorkshire wicket-keeping. He played 429 one day matches, scoring 5,439 runs at 20.68 with one century. Bairstow played for 21 seasons, three of them as club captain.

Bairstow was described by the Wisden Cricketers' Almanack as "perhaps the only unequivocally popular man in Yorkshire", at a time when the fortunes of the county were hampered by in-fighting and its own regulations, which prevented it from fielding players born outside of the county. His years as captain of the county were, according to Derek Hodgson, "a series of uphill cavalry charges". Bairstow however helped the county in its sparse successes during his career, including the John Player League in 1983 and the Benson and Hedges Cup in 1987. He also led Yorkshire as captain (and man of the match) to a narrow defeat in a Benson and Hedges Cup semi-final against Warwickshire in 1984. His only List A hundred, in the same competition in 1981, did however come in a victory in an extraordinary game against Derbyshire, where he dominated an unbroken last-wicket stand of 80 with Mark Johnson to give Yorkshire an improbable one-wicket win.

He played only four Test matches for England, as he was behind Bob Taylor and later Paul Downton in the selectors' minds. He made 59 (his highest Test score) on his debut, and in his second Test, on his home county ground, top-scored in the first innings with 40 as England salvaged a draw against the West Indies after initially collapsing. He had more opportunities in One Day Internationals on the strength of his batting in domestic cricket – he made ten first-class centuries – but consistently failed to break through, and never scored more than 23 in his twenty ODI innings. A highlight of his international career came in a One Day International at Sydney Cricket Ground in 1980. County colleague Graham Stevenson walked out to join Bairstow at the crease with 35 wanted from six overs. "Evening, lad," said Bairstow. "We can piss this." Which they did, securing an England victory by two wickets. The Wisden review of this tour observed: "England could not have been served better by their two wicket-keepers" (Bairstow and Taylor).

He played for Griqualand West, during the winters of 1976 and 1977, appearing rather surprisingly as a seam bowler on two occasions and taking 3–82 against Transvaal B. He took his career best first-class figures, 3-25, late on in his career, in a match (in which Richard Blakey was keeping wicket) against the MCC in 1987.

Bairstow appeared after retiring in a testimonial match at Trent Bridge for Derek Randall in 1993, playing for an England XI against an Australian XI, and was at the wicket (batting with Bob Taylor) when the match ended in a tie.

== Retirement and death ==
After retirement from playing in 1990, Bairstow became a popular radio commentator. However, he engaged in arguments with the Yorkshire management, and also suffered from depression. In late 1997, Bairstow took an overdose of tablets, and although he survived, a few weeks later he hanged himself at his home in Marton-cum-Grafton, Yorkshire. The coroner in the case recorded an open verdict, saying that he was not convinced Bairstow had meant to kill himself.

== Family ==
Bairstow had two sons, both of whom went on to play cricket professionally. His son from his first marriage, Andrew, played first-class cricket fleetingly for Derbyshire. His son from his second marriage, Jonny, currently plays as wicket-keeper and batsman for Yorkshire and formerly for England. Jonny's chosen squad number, 51, is a tribute to his father's birth year.
