= Listed buildings in Marton cum Grafton =

Marton cum Grafton is a civil parish in the county of North Yorkshire, England. It contains 10 listed buildings that are recorded in the National Heritage List for England. All the listed buildings are designated at Grade II, the lowest of the three grades, which is applied to "buildings of national importance and special interest". The parish contains the villages of Marton and Grafton and the surrounding area. All the listed buildings are in the villages, and consist of houses, cottages and associated structures, farmhouses, a public house and a church.

== Buildings ==
Name and location	Photograph	Date	Notes
Punch Bowl Inn; 54.06082°N 1.36301°W		Late 16th century	The public house has been altered and extended, it is rendered, and has a pantile roof. The original part has a timber framed core and a high plinth. There are two storeys and three bays. The doorway has an architrave and an oblong fanlight, the windows are sashes, those on the upper floor horizontally-sliding, and on the roof is a modern dormer.
Beck Farmhouse; 54.06493°N 1.36590°W	—	Late 17th century (probable)	The farmhouse is in cobble and brick, with limestone quoins, dentilled eaves, and a pantile roof with raised brick verges. There are two storeys and three bays. In the centre is a modern door, and the windows are modern casements.
Peach Tree Farmhouse; 54.06017°N 1.36289°W	—	Late 17th century	The farmhouse is in red-brown brick, with a stepped and moulded string course, pilasters on the upper floor, and stepped eaves and shaped corbels on the gable end facing the street. There are two storeys, three bays, and a projecting gabled wing on the left. The doorway has a rusticated surround and an elliptical head, and the windows are modern casements.
Dew House; 54.05977°N 1.36481°W	—	18th century	A farmhouse in reddish-brown brick, with a floor band, stepped eaves at the rear, and a pantile roof. There are two storeys and three bays. Steps lead up to a central doorway with an oblong fanlight. The windows are sashes in architraves, with rendered splayed lintels and keystones.
Orchard Cottage; 54.05958°N 1.36372°W	—	18th century	The cottage is in rendered brick on a plinth, with stepped and cogged eaves, and a swept pantile roof with raised verges. There are two storeys and three bays. On the front is a gabled porch and a doorway, flanked by horizontally-sliding sash windows. The upper floor contains a small square light between two stepped and chamfered fixed lights.
Prospect Farmhouse; 54.06392°N 1.35974°W	—	18th century	A wing was added to the farmhouse in the 19th century. The original part is in reddish-brown brick, the wing is in pinkish-brown brick, and both parts have pantile roofs, the original part with stone slate courses at the eaves. There are two storeys, the original part has two bays, and the recessed right wing has one bay. In the original part is a stepped floor band, stepped and dentilled eaves, a central doorway, and sash windows in architraves. The wing has sash windows, on the ground floor with two lights and on the upper floor with one light and a segmental head.
Garden wall, Dew House; 54.05968°N 1.36466°W	—	Late 18th century	The wall enclosing the front garden is in red brick, with stone on the exterior faces of the side walls, and stone coping. Along the front is a low wall with iron railings and a gate. At the angles are brick piers with domed caps, and, at the sides, the walls are ramped up to about 15 feet (4.6 m).
Majestic House; 54.06368°N 1.36422°W	—	Early 19th century	A farmhouse in rendered brick with a hipped Welsh slate roof. There are two storeys and three bays. Three steps lead up to a central doorway that has pilasters, an oblong fanlight and a cornice. The windows are sashes in architraves.
Corner House; 54.06371°N 1.36470°W	—	Early 19th century	The house is in rendered brick and has a pantile roof. There are two storeys and two bays. The central doorway has a fanlight in an architrave, and the windows are sash windows in architraves, with segmental heads.
Christ Church; 54.05879°N 1.36282°W		1875	The church was designed by John Ladds in Early English style, and incorporates 12th-century material from an earlier church nearby. It is built in sandstone with a Welsh slate roof, and consists of a nave, a north porch, and a chancel with a south vestry. On the west gable is an open double bellcote. The north doorway incorporates a Norman doorhead, with a tympanum containing a cross in a roundel. Inside the church is a re-set Norman doorway with three orders of shafts.
