= Listed buildings in Arkendale =

Arkendale is a civil parish in the county of North Yorkshire, England. It contains seven listed buildings that are recorded in the National Heritage List for England. All the listed buildings are designated at Grade II, the lowest of the three grades, which is applied to "buildings of national importance and special interest". The parish contains the village of Arkendale and the surrounding countryside. All the listed buildings are in the village, and consist of houses, a farmhouse and farm buildings

== Buildings ==
Name and location	Photograph	Date	Notes
Long Cottage; 54.04290°N 1.41345°W		Late 17th or early 18th century	The house is in reddish-brown brick, with a floor band, stepped and cogged eaves, and a pantile roof with Dutch gables. There are two storeys and four bays. It contains a modern doorway and casement windows.
Dale House Barn; 54.04009°N 1.40674°W		Late 18th century	The barn, which has been converted for residential use, is in cobbles with additions in brick, quoins, and a pantile roof with stone coping. There are seven bays, and it contains opposing wagon doors and slit vents.
Pond House Farmhouse; 54.04376°N 1.41573°W	—	Late 18th century	The farmhouse is in pale brown brick on a stone plinth, with stone dressings, quoins, stepped and dentilled eaves at the rear, and a Welsh slate roof with stone verges and shaped kneelers. There are two storeys and three bays. The central doorway has a fanlight, and the windows are sashes in wooden architraves.
Barn east of Holgate Bank Farmhouse; 54.04377°N 1.40822°W		Late 18th to early 19th century	The barn, which has been converted for residential use, is in reddish-brown brick on a cobble plinth, with stepped and dentilled eaves, and a pantile roof with stone copings and shaped kneelers. It has a north aisle, slit vents, opposed wagon doors and a pitching hole.
Grange Barn; 54.04381°N 1.40915°W	—	Early 19th century	The barn, which has been converted for residential use, is in reddish-brown brick and cobbles, with quoins, and a pantile roof with stone coping on the west, and hipped on the right. There are two storeys, an L-shaped plan, and a front range of six bays. It contains opposed wagon doors and slit vents.
Dovecote, Pond House Farm; 54.04370°N 1.41625°W	—	Early 19th century (probable)	The dovecote is in rendered brick on a stone plinth, and has a pyramidal stone slate roof. There is a square plan, and it contains a doorway and dove holes on the south face. Inside, there are dove boxes in the thickness of the walls.
Granary and stable block, Pond House Farm; 54.04386°N 1.41603°W	—	Early 19th century	The stable with a granary above is in cobble and brick, with stone quoins, and a stone slate roof. It contains three stable doors with two barn windows above, and external steps lead to an upper floor entrance.
