= Jonny Bairstow =

English cricketer (born 1989)

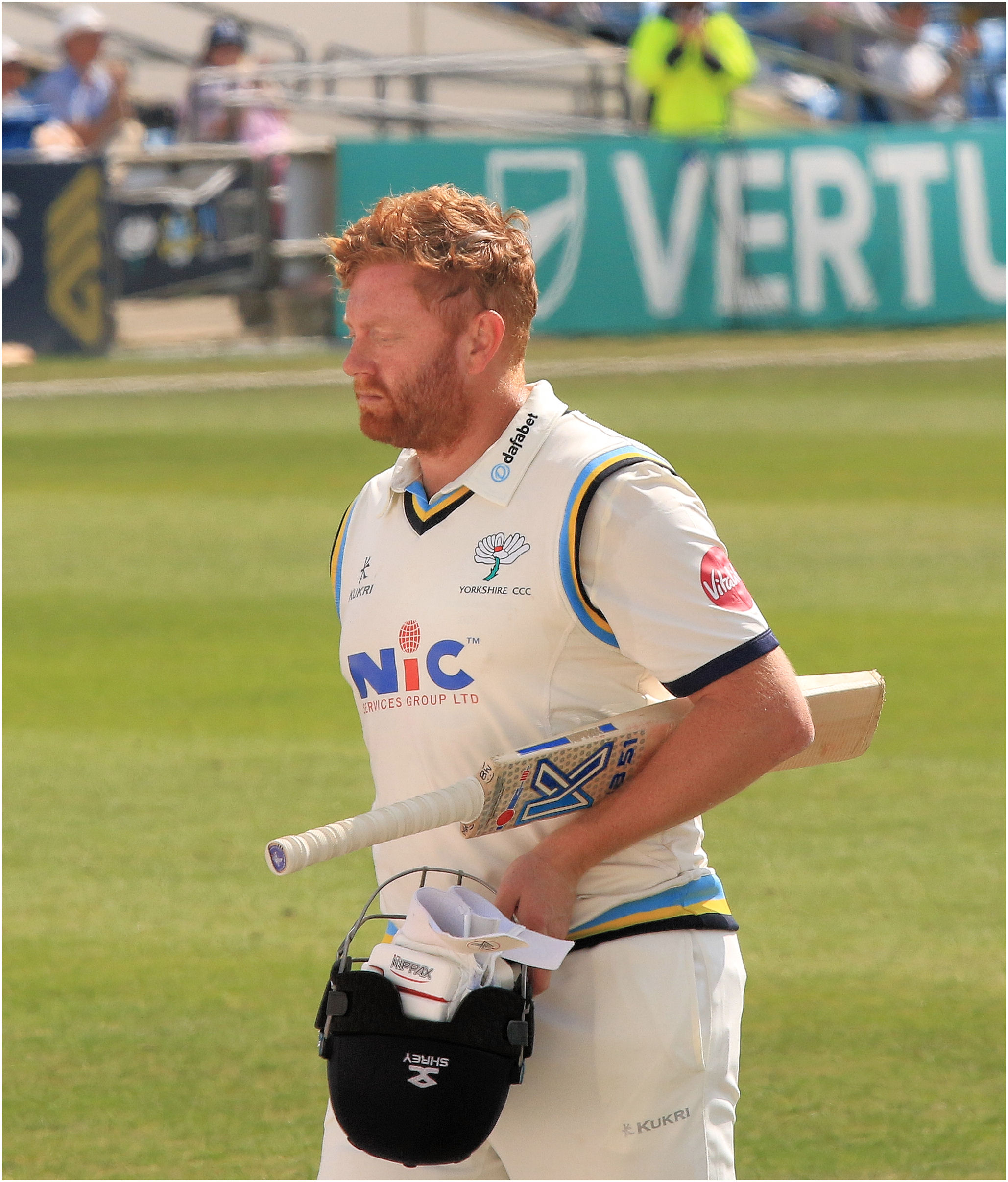
- Bairstow in 2024

Personal information
- Full name: Jonathan Marc Bairstow
- Born: 26 September 1989 (age 37); Bradford, West Yorkshire, England
- Nickname: Bluey
- Batting: Right-handed
- Role: Wicket-keeper-batter
- Relatives: David Bairstow (father); Andrew Bairstow (half-brother)

International information
- National side: England (2011–2024)
- Test debut (cap 652): 17 May 2012 v West Indies
- Last Test: 7 March 2024 v India
- ODI debut (cap 223): 16 September 2011 v India
- Last ODI: 11 November 2023 v Pakistan
- ODI shirt no.: 51
- T20I debut (cap 56): 23 September 2011 v West Indies
- Last T20I: 27 June 2024 v India
- T20I shirt no.: 51

Domestic team information
- Years: Team
- 2009–present: Yorkshire
- 2016: Peshawar Zalmi
- 2018: Kerala Kings
- 2019–2021: Sunrisers Hyderabad
- 2021–2025: Welsh Fire
- 2022–2024: Punjab Kings
- 2025: Mumbai Indians
- 2025: Joburg Super Kings
- 2026: London Spirit

Career statistics
Competition	Test	ODI	T20I	FC
Matches	100	107	80	245
Runs scored	6,042	3,868	1,671	15,363
Batting average	36.39	42.97	29.83	42.20
100s/50s	12/26	11/17	0/10	32/80
Top score	167*	141*	90	246
Catches/stumpings	242/14	55/3	46/1	625/27
Medal record
Men's cricket
Representing England
ICC Cricket World Cup
Winner	2019 England & Wales
- Source: ESPNcricinfo, 26 September 2026

Jonathan Marc Bairstow (born 26 September 1989) is an English cricketer who played internationally for England in all formats as a right-handed wicket-keeper-batter. He represents Yorkshire in domestic cricket and London Spirit in The Hundred. Bairstow was part of the England team that won the 2019 Cricket World Cup.

== Early life ==
Jonny Bairstow was born on 26 September 1989 in Bradford, West Yorkshire. His mother, Janet, became the first female vice-president of Yorkshire County Cricket Club in 2020. His father was David Bairstow, who played as a wicket-keeper for both Yorkshire and England. David died by suicide in 1998 when Jonny was eight years old, but he had taught Jonny how to play cricket and has remained a lasting inspiration. Jonny has a sister, Rebecca, and their elder half-brother is former Derbyshire player Andrew Bairstow.

Bairstow went to St Peter's School, York, in 2001 and became an all-round athlete. When he was interviewed by Wisden Cricketers' Almanack in 2016, he recalled that besides keeping wicket in cricket, he had been a fly-half in rugby, a centre-mid in hockey, and a right-back in football. His cricketing ability was recognised by Wisden in 2008 when he was chosen as the inaugural winner of their Young Schools Cricketer of the Year award, after he had scored 654 runs for the school in 2007. In football, Bairstow was a member of the Leeds United Academy for eight years until he was fifteen. When it came to a choice between cricket and football, he felt that he had the ability "to make it professionally" in cricket, but not in football.

== Yorkshire ==
Aged 18, Bairstow was invited to play Second Eleven cricket for Yorkshire in the 2008 season, making six appearances in the Second XI Championship, in which he scored 308 runs at an average of 61.60. He was included in Yorkshire's first-team squad for the final County Championship match of the season against Sussex, but was not selected for the starting eleven. Three weeks later, however, Bairstow signed a two-year contract with Yorkshire.

He began the 2009 season playing for the Second XI. He was awarded his Second XI cap and, in early June, he scored 202 not out against Leicestershire Second XI. Bairstow was then picked for the first team in a County Championship match against Somerset at Headingley. He replaced the injured Michael Vaughan and, on his first-class debut, scored 28 and 82. In Somerset's second innings, Yorkshire's wicket-keeper Gerard Brophy was injured and Bairstow replaced him, taking four catches. He played in twelve first-class matches that season, scoring 592 runs at an average of 45.53, completing six half-centuries with a highest score of 84 not out, and taking 21 catches.

Bairstow became a Yorkshire first-team regular in the 2010 season. In sixteen first-class appearances, he scored 918 runs at 41.72 with eight fifties and a highest score of 81. He took 29 catches and completed five stumpings. His potential was recognised by selection for the England Performance Programme squad to tour Australia in 2010–11. In addition, he was a member of the England Lions team which toured the West Indies from January to March 2011. The Lions took part in the 2010–11 Regional Four Day Competition and Bairstow played in three of their seven matches. His best performance was an innings of 85 against Combined Campuses and Colleges, sharing a fifth wicket partnership of 134 with Jimmy Adams.

Bairstow became Yorkshire's first-choice wicket-keeper in the 2011 season and was awarded his county cap. He began the season well and scored 205, his maiden first-class century, against Nottinghamshire at Trent Bridge. Playing in fifteen matches, he scored 1,213 runs in the season at 48.52 with three centuries, and was the only Yorkshire batter to score 1,000 runs. He also took 47 catches.

Bairstow was chosen as the Cricket Writers' Club Young Cricketer of the Year for 2011. He is the ninth of thirteen Yorkshire players who have won this award; his predecessors included Fred Trueman, Geoffrey Boycott, and Bairstow's team-mate Adil Rashid.

Yorkshire were in Division One of the County Championship when Bairstow made his debut in 2009. In 2011, they were relegated to Division Two but, with a new team being built under coach Jason Gillespie, they were re-promoted in 2012 as runners-up to Derbyshire. Bairstow played in nine Division Two matches and scored 588 runs with three centuries. Yorkshire were runners-up to Durham in the 2013 Division One season, Bairstow playing in eight matches. He had a good season as a wicket-keeper, taking 27 catches but was less successful with the bat and scored only one century. Yorkshire then relived their past glories for the next two seasons winning back-to-back County Championship titles, taking their all-time tally to a record 32. In 2014, Bairstow with 38 catches and four stumpings had a good season as wicket-keeper. He scored 647 runs in his thirteen matches, with a highest score of 161 not out against Sussex at Hove, although that was his sole championship century.

Bairstow had an outstanding season in 2015 as Yorkshire retained the title. He played in only nine championship matches but he scored 1,108 runs at the very high average of 92.33 with five centuries and five half-centuries in his fifteen innings. His highest score was 219 not out against Durham at the Riverside Ground in Chester-le-Street. Yorkshire batted first in this match and were struggling at 191/6 when Bairstow was joined by Tim Bresnan. Batting well into the second day, they added an unbeaten 366 and broke the club record for a seventh wicket partnership, Bresnan scoring 169 not out. Yorkshire went on to win the match by an innings and 47 runs.

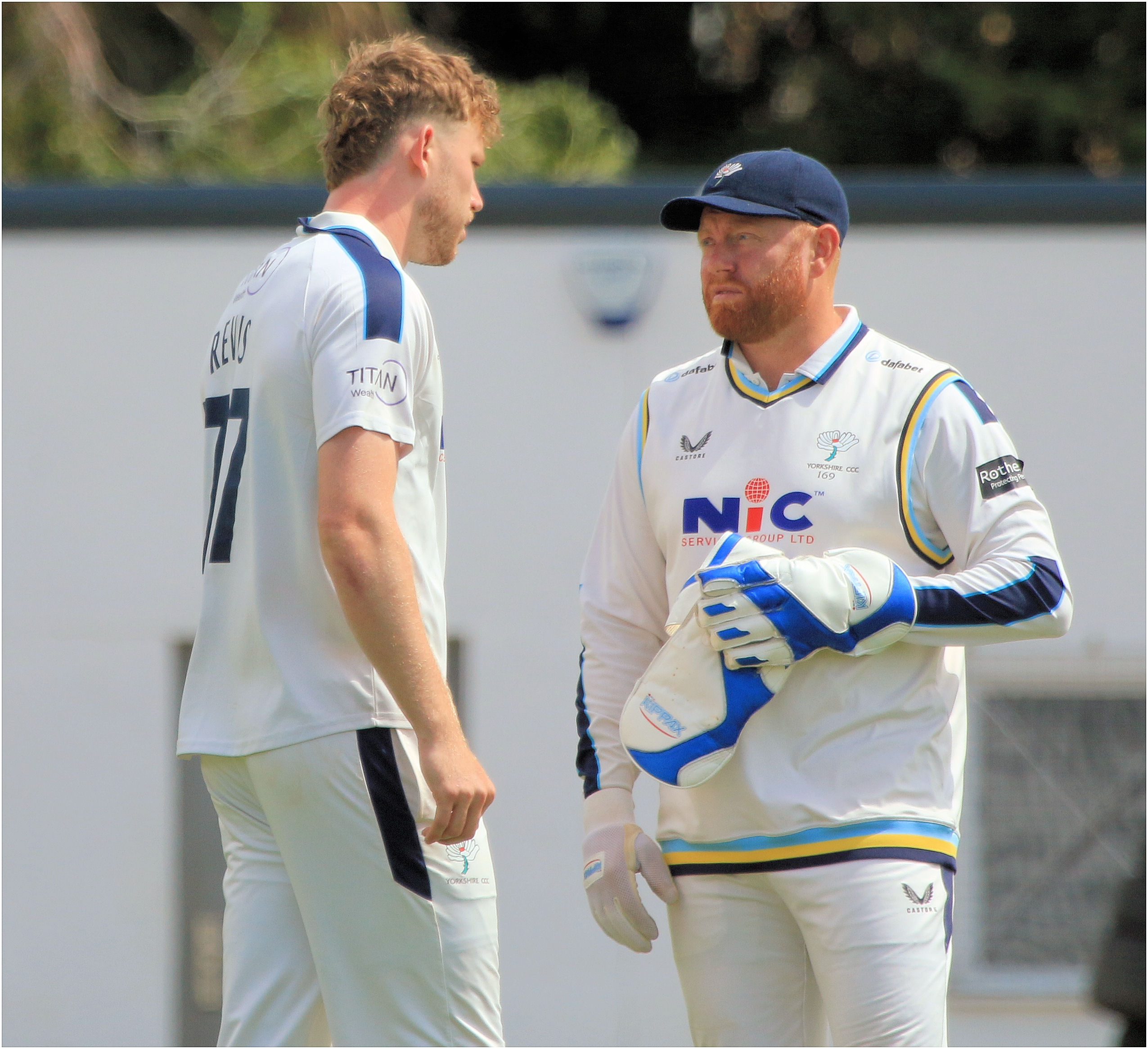
Bairstow captaining Yorkshire CCC in 2025

Bairstow's performances in 2015 resulted in him being named as one of the five Wisden Cricketers of the Year in the Almanack's 2016 edition. Simon Wilde in his dedication began by describing Bairstow as a good man in a crisis and pointed out that all five of his 2015 championship centuries "were carved from adversity" because, as in the Durham match, Yorkshire were struggling until Bairstow came in.

Having become a regular member of England squads, Bairstow signed a central contract with the national team which has meant him making only occasional appearances for Yorkshire. He played in 88 first-class matches for the club from June 2009 to May 2016, but has appeared in only nine since then until May 2023. In Twenty20, he played in 63 from June 2010 to August 2016, but was then unavailable until June 2021; he has played in five matches between then and May 2023. In Yorkshire's List A matches, he played in 44 from July 2009 to May 2017, but in none since then. In one of his last List A matches for the club, Bairstow scored a career-best 174 from 113 deliveries as Yorkshire defeated Durham by six wickets at Headingley on 3 May 2017. Durham had scored 335/5 and Yorkshire's 339/4 was their highest ever successful run chase in a List A match.

In March 2025, Bairstow was named as Yorkshire's red-ball captain.

== ODI/T20I ==
=== Debuts ===
On the strength of his performances in 2011, Bairstow was included in the England squads for both One Day Internationals (ODI) and Twenty20 Internationals (T20I). In August, he travelled to Dublin with England's ODI squad for a match against Ireland, but did not play. He made his ODI debut against India on 16 September, and then his T20I debut against West Indies on 23 September.

Playing as a specialist batter in England's final ODI against India, Bairstow scored an unbeaten 41 off just 21 balls to help England reach a Duckworth-Lewis adjusted total. His innings included three sixes, the first off just the fifth ball he faced, and he was named Man of the Match.

On his T20I debut, Bairstow had competition for the role of wicket-keeper as both Jos Buttler and Craig Kieswetter were in the team. Kieswetter "took the gloves", so Bairstow and Buttler played as specialist batters. However, neither of them did bat because Kieswetter and Alex Hales won the match with an unbeaten first wicket partnership of 128, after West Indies were dismissed for 125. There was a second T201 two days later and West Indies won by 25 runs, the series ending as a 1–1 draw. They scored 113/5 and then dismissed England for 88. Bairstow was England's fifth batter and he was bowled by Garey Mathurin for four.

In 2011–12, Bairstow visited India, Bangladesh, Sri Lanka, and the United Arab Emirates (UAE) as part of various England teams. He played for England in five ODIs and one T20I against India in October. He then joined England Lions in January 2012 for seven matches against Bangladesh A and five against Sri Lanka A. He rejoined England in February 2012 for three T20Is against Pakistan in the UAE.

Bairstow completed his first ODI century in a match against West Indies at Old Trafford in September 2017. He opened the innings for England, after West Indies had totalled 204/9, and scored 100 not out as he led England to a seven-wicket victory.

=== World Cup tournaments ===
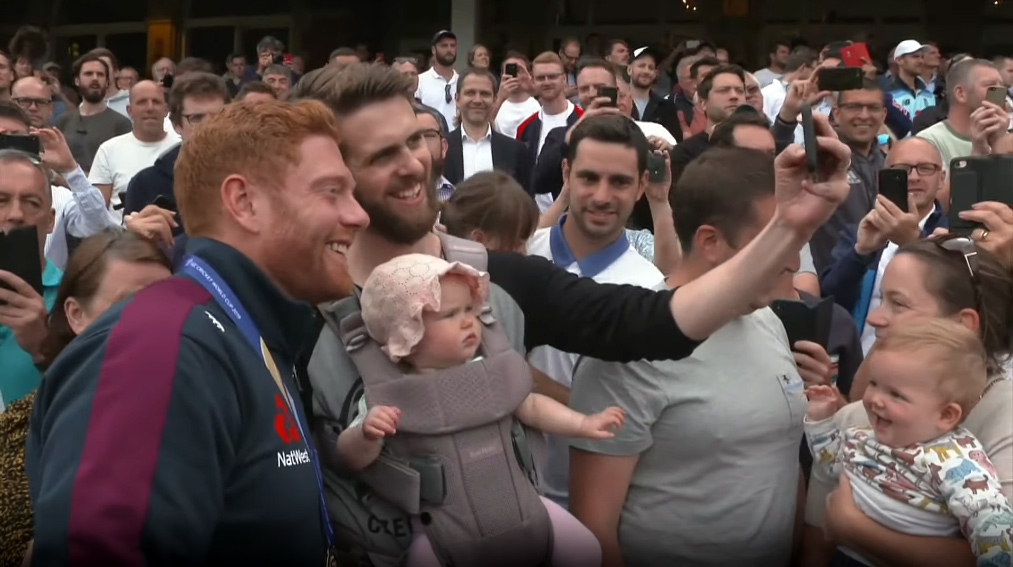
Jonny Bairstow with fans after the 2019 Cricket World Cup

At the end of the 2012 season, Bairstow was included in the England squad for the 2012 ICC World Twenty20 in Sri Lanka. He appeared in all five of the matches that the team played but without success, his highest score being 18. England reached the Super 8 (quarter-final) stage where they lost to eventual champions West Indies.

He was left out of England's squads for the 2014 and 2016 ICC World Twenty20s, but he played in the 2021 and 2024 editions. He missed the 2022 tournament, which England won, because of a broken leg. In May 2024, he was named in England's squad for the 2024 ICC Men's T20 World Cup tournament.

Bairstow also missed the 2015 Cricket World Cup but took part in the 2019 and 2023 editions. He was a member of England's winning team in 2019, playing in the final against New Zealand at Lord's. This was a tied match which was decided by means of a super over. New Zealand batted first and scored 241/8. In reply, England were all out for 241. Bairstow opened the innings with Jason Roy and was the third man out, having scored 36, at 71/3. The super over was also a tie, 15 apiece, but England won by virtue of having scored more boundaries.

== Test cricket ==
=== Debut ===
Following a successful start to the 2012 season, scoring two centuries for Yorkshire, Bairstow was named in the England squad for the first Test match against West Indies at Lord's in May. He played in the match, his debut in Test cricket, and was presented with his England cap by close family friend Geoffrey Boycott. England won the three-match series 2–0. Matt Prior was England's established wicket-keeper so Bairstow was selected as a specialist batter. He played in all three matches but could only score 38 runs in his four innings. South Africa toured England from July to September and also played a three-match Test series. Bairstow was left out of the England team for the first two Tests as the selectors tried other options. This series did not go well for England as South Africa were a very strong team. Bairstow continued to play well for Yorkshire and England recalled him for the third Test at Lord's.

South Africa, leading the series 1–0, won the toss and decided to bat first. They reached 262/7 at close of play on the first day and were all out for 309 in the morning session of the second day. England's early batting struggled against the South African attack and they had been reduced to 54/4 when Bairstow, sixth in the order, joined Ian Bell. They added 124 for the fifth wicket until Bell was dismissed for 58. Bairstow continued with help from Prior, Stuart Broad, and Graeme Swann, taking the score to 264 when he was bowled by Morné Morkel for 95. England reached 315, a first innings lead of six after facing disaster before Bairstow came in. Bairstow's innings included thirteen boundaries off 196 balls in just over six hours. In the second innings, South Africa scored 351, thanks largely to a century by Hashim Amla. England, needing 346 to win, were all out on the final day for 294. Bairstow again played well and scored 54 before he was bowled by Imran Tahir at 134/5. South Africa won the match by 51 runs and the series 2–0.

Wisden commented that Bairstow's two innings against South Africa "ought to have been a defining moment... but England seemed unsure how to use him". Bairstow had the talent to be a specialist batter in the team but England appeared to view him as their reserve keeper and, therefore, a spare batter. Bairstow told Wisden that he was "more gutted" to get out in the second innings against South Africa than the first. He thought England had a real chance of reaching their target.

=== First Ashes series ===
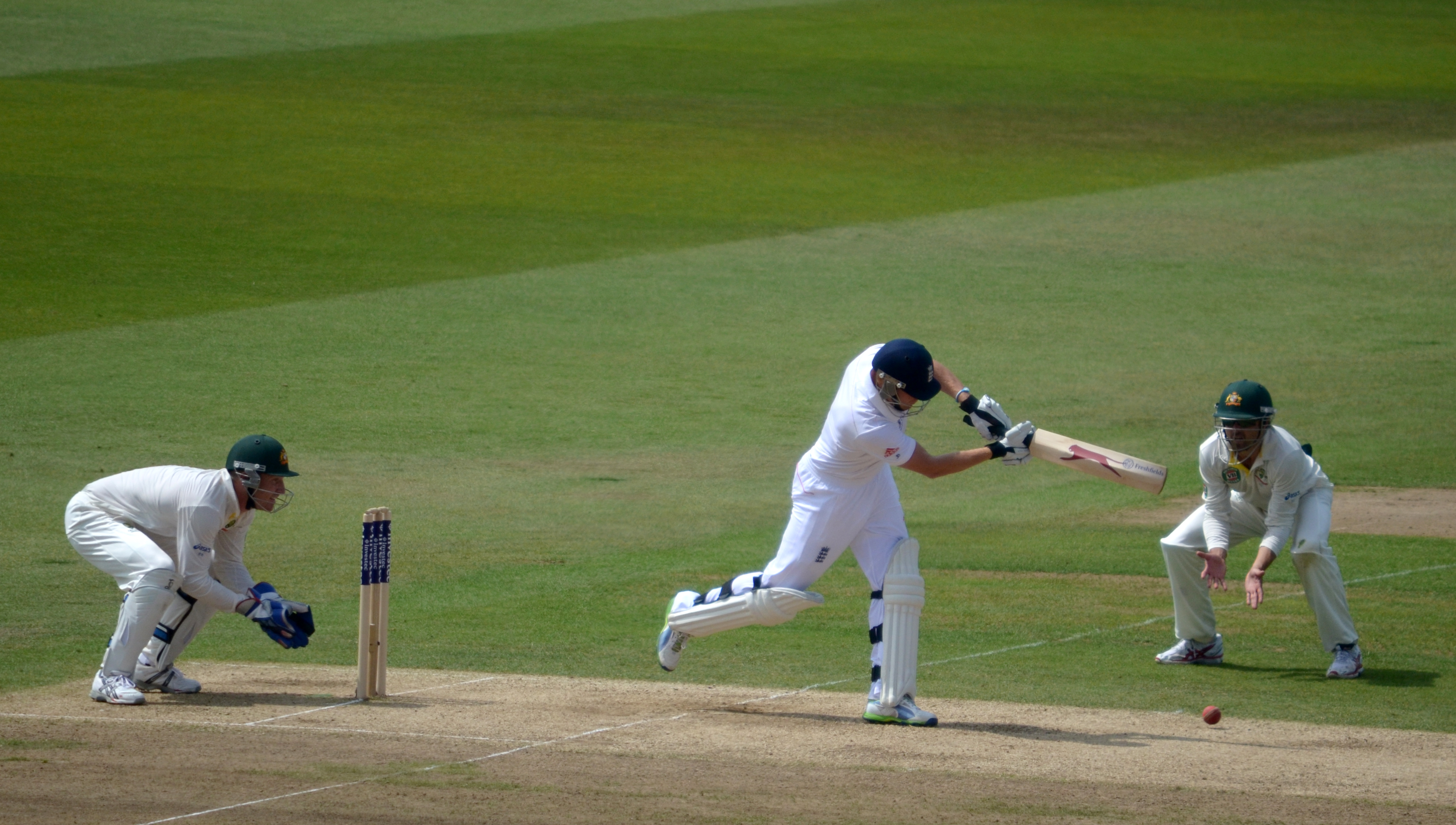
Bairstow batting against Australia in the 1st Test of the 2013 Ashes series at Trent Bridge.

Bairstow went to India and New Zealand in the winter of 2012–13, playing in one Test in each country. He was selected for two home Tests against New Zealand in May 2013 and did well by top-scoring with 41 in the first innings of the first Test. In the second Test, played at Headingley, he scored 64 off 99 balls and shared a fifth-wicket partnership of 124 with his Yorkshire colleague Joe Root.

In July 2013, Bairstow made his Ashes debut against Australia. After scores of 37 and 15 in the first Test at Trent Bridge, he scored 67 off 146 balls in the second Test at Lord's. England won both matches and went on to a 3–0 series win. In its tour review, Wisden commented that Bairstow was "impressive mainly in the field".

There was a return series in Australia the following winter and Bairstow was in the squad. He travelled as reserve wicket-keeper to Matt Prior and did not play in any of the first three Tests, all of which England lost. Prior had been in poor form and Bairstow replaced him for the last two matches. This meant he and his father David became the first father/son combination to keep wicket for England in Test cricket. Although Bairstow performed well behind the wicket, he made only 49 runs in his four innings. Australia won both matches and regained the Ashes with a 5–0 series "whitewash".

=== 2015 recall ===
Bairstow was left out of the England set-up for the next 18 months until, in recognition of his outstanding season for Yorkshire in 2015, he was recalled to the squad for an ODI against touring New Zealand. He scored 83 not out from 60 balls in that match, which England won, and was rewarded with a place in the team for the third Test against Australia at Edgbaston. England won the series 3–2 and Wisden remarked that, in direct contrast with other England players, Bairstow "looked impressive rather than convincing". Bairstow scored 5 in his only innings at Edgbaston, but England won the match by 8 wickets to take a 2–1 series lead, and made no unenforced changes to the team for the fourth Test at Trent Bridge. Australia batted first and were dismissed for a mere 60 in just 18 overs, Stuart Broad taking 8/15. England in reply had made 96/3 when Bairstow came in to join Joe Root. They shared a stand of 173 until Bairstow was out for 74. England's total was 391/9 declared and they bowled Australia out for 253 to take the match by an innings and 78 runs. In its match report, Wisden said Root and Bairstow "took control" and that Bairstow was "the more obviously busy, urging himself forward and meeting the bowlers head on". Australia won the last Test but England had secured the series at Trent Bridge.

Bairstow was in the England team which met Pakistan in the UAE in October and November 2015. They lost the three-match series 2–0 but Bairstow played well as a specialist batter, making useful scores of 43, 41 and 79. He was reserve wicket-keeper to Jos Buttler who struggled to find his form. Ahead of the 2015–16 series in South Africa, England announced that Bairstow would be their first-choice wicket-keeper in Test cricket. In the first Test at Kingsmead, in Durban, Bairstow scored 41 and a quick-fire 79 to help England win the match by 241 runs. He also took four catches and completed a stumping.

=== World record partnership ===
The second Test at Newlands, in Cape Town, was a highpoint in Bairstow's career. England batted first and were going well at 223/5 when Bairstow came in to join Ben Stokes. Together, they shared a world record partnership of 399 for the sixth wicket which ended when Stokes was run out as they tried to score the 400th run. Stokes, whose innings was especially memorable, had scored 258, the second-fastest double-century in Test history. Bairstow scored 150 not out, his maiden Test century and a defining moment in his life. As Wisden described it, Bairstow had reached 95 at lunch on the second day to equal his highest Test score, and he then spent 22 balls getting the next five runs. Completing his century was emotional because he looked to the sky and thought about his father, and also his grandfather who had died a few months earlier. His mother Janet and sister Becky were watching him from the stand. Wisden summarised his innings: "A cricketer sometimes too tense to give his best for England had never batted so serenely, remarkable given the carnage Stokes was inflicting".

=== 2015–16 to 2021–22 ===
Bairstow played in most of England's Test matches during the next six years, although he was left out of the team for the winter tours of New Zealand and Sri Lanka in 2019–20. He toured Bangladesh and India in 2016–17, and India again in 2020–21. He played in a total of seven Tests on the 2017–18 tour of Australia and New Zealand. He visited Sri Lanka twice, in 2018–19 and 2020–21; and the West Indies twice, in 2018–19 and 2021–22.

Bairstow had a "dream series" in 2016 against Sri Lanka. He scored "an imperious century" (140) at Headingley, his county's home ground, having arrived at the crease with England in trouble on 83 for five. There was a similar situation in the third Test at Lord's. England were 84 for four when he came in and he scored 167 not out, taking them to 416. England won the series 2–0, and Bairstow won the Player of the Series award, jointly with Kaushal Silva.

In the winter of 2021–22, Bairstow went to both Australia, where he played in two Tests; and the West Indies, where he played in three. In the fourth Test against Australia at the Sydney Cricket Ground, he scored 113 in the final innings, England's only century of the series which helped them hold on for a draw. Wisden commented that, in a disastrous series for England (who lost 4–0), "the batters totalled 17 noughts and one spirited hundred from Jonny Bairstow". In the first Test against the West Indies, Bairstow scored a "pugnacious" 140 to rescue England after they had sunk to 48 for four on the opening day of the series, which West Indies won 1–0.

=== Wisden Trophy winner in 2022 ===
In the 2022 season, Bairstow played in only six first-class matches which were all Tests: three against New Zealand, one against India, and two against South Africa. His statistical record for the season shows that he played eleven innings, twice not out; he scored a total of 681 runs at an average of 75.66; and his highest score was 162 with four centuries and one half-century. He also took twelve catches. Wisden said that Bairstow's "deconstruction of the usual rules of Test batting" was "stunning".

In June, playing in the second Test of the series against New Zealand at Trent Bridge, Bairstow hit a match-winning 136 off 92 balls on the fifth day, guiding England to their target of 299. His hundred, completed off 77 balls, was the second-fastest Test century by an English batter. In the third Test at Headingley, England had slumped to 55 for six in their first innings after New Zealand had scored 329. Bairstow was joined by Jamie Overton and they added 241 for the seventh wicket, the partnership ending when Overton was out for 97. Bairstow went on to score 162 at better than a run-a-ball and England totalled 360 for a first innings lead. They won the match by seven wickets after Bairstow scored 71 not out in the second innings, sharing an unbeaten fourth wicket partnership of 111 with Joe Root, who scored 86 not out.

England's next Test was the rescheduled fifth match of the previous year's series against India. The match had been postponed because of the disruption caused by the COVID-19 pandemic. India batted first and scored 416. They then reduced England to an overnight 84 for five at the end of the second day. Bairstow again needed to stage a rescue and he did this with an innings of 106 on the third day which saved the follow-on and took England to 284. India reached 125 for three at the close to lead by 257. They were all out for 245 on the fourth day, leaving England with a target of 378 to win. With Root and Bairstow together, they reached 259 for three at the close and so needed another 119 on the final day. Root (142 not out) and Bairstow (114 not out) both completed centuries as they reached the target before lunch with an unbroken partnership of 269. The successful run chase was England's highest in Test cricket. Bairstow's century was his second of the match, his fourth in five innings, and his sixth in 2022.

For his performances in the 2022 season, Bairstow received the Professional Cricketers' Association Men's Cricketer of the Year award and the Cricket Writers' Club Bob Willis Trophy. He was also nominated for the 2022 Men's Test Cricketer of the Year title and was named in the ICC Men's Test Team of the Year. Bairstow was the inaugural winner of the "Wisden Trophy", launched in April 2023 to recognise the outstanding Test performance of the previous calendar year. Ten performances were nominated, including three by Bairstow; the others, one each, were by Ebadot Hossain, Usman Khawaja, Tom Latham, Ravindra Jadeja, Prabath Jayasuriya, Marnus Labuschagne, and Harry Brook. Bairstow won for his two centuries in the match against India.

In August 2022, Bairstow was playing golf near his home when he fell and, in freak circumstances, broke his left leg in three places. He was out of action for eight months until he made his comeback playing for Yorkshire in May 2023. He returned to Test cricket in June when he played in a match against Ireland at Lord's.

=== 2023 to present ===
Australia toured England that year and Bairstow played in all five Tests. The series was drawn 2–2 and so Australia retained the Ashes. On the final day of the second Test at Lord's, England were chasing a target of 371 and had reached 193 for 5 during the morning session. Bairstow was batting with Ben Stokes and had scored 10 when he faced the final ball of an over from Cameron Green. It was a short-pitched delivery and Bairstow ducked underneath it, letting it go through to wicket-keeper Alex Carey. Thinking the ball was dead, Bairstow left his ground and started walking down the pitch to talk to Stokes. Just prior to Bairstow leaving his crease, Carey had underarmed the ball towards the wicket. Bairstow had left his crease when the ball struck the stumps and Carey appealed for a stumping. The decision was left to the VCR umpire who gave Bairstow out. The crowd reacted by booing the Australians and chanting: "Same old Aussies. Always cheating". In fact, they were not cheating because Carey's action complied with Law 20.1.2 in that the fielding team had not "ceased to regard it (the ball) as in play".

Bairstow's best performance in the series was in the fourth Test at Old Trafford where he scored 99 not out in England's 592. He was left on 99 when the last wicket fell, the third time that has happened in an Ashes Test after Geoff Boycott in 1979 and Steve Waugh in 1995. With England in a strong position, the match ended in a draw after the final day's play was abandoned due to heavy rain.

From January to March 2024, Bairstow played in five Tests for England in India, a series which India won 4–1. He scored 238 runs in his ten innings with a highest score of 39. The final Test at the Himachal Pradesh Cricket Association Stadium in Dharamshala was the 100th played by both Bairstow and India's Ravichandran Ashwin. Bairstow also reached 6,000 Test runs in the match.

He was dropped for the West Indies tour of England in July 2024, with England men's managing director Rob Key pointing to his declining form as the reason for his omission.

== Franchises ==
Bairstow first played Twenty20 in 2010, for Yorkshire. Since he became an international, he has been in demand by various T20 franchises and has played for Peshawar Zalmi (Pakistan Super League; 2015–2016), Sunrisers Hyderabad (Indian Premier League; 2019–2021), Welsh Fire (The Hundred; 2021–2023), Punjab Kings (Indian Premier League; 2022–2024).

Despite going unsold in the 2025 IPL mega auction, he joined Mumbai Indians at a price of 5.25 crore (approximately £459,316) as a replacement for Will Jacks for the IPL 2025 playoffs.

In addition to these, Bairstow signed a short-term contract in November 2018 to play for Kerala Kings, alongside Eoin Morgan, in the T10 League in Sharjah. In his second (and final) game for the franchise, he scored 84 not out off 24 balls — a record in the format — helping his team to a seven-wicket victory.

== Style and personality ==
When Bairstow was chosen as one of the Wisden Cricketers of the Year for 2015, the dedication began by saying he is "a good man for a crisis". Bairstow has been hardened by adversity and is inspired by the closeness of a family united by his father's untimely death. His mother, Janet, has commented on his work ethic and his determination to succeed.

His England batting coach, Mark Ramprakash, says Bairstow is "a proper batter who can play in all formats" and that he excels "in difficult conditions when the ball (is) moving around". However, Ramprakash adds that while some leading players like Alastair Cook, Ian Bell, or himself are "methodical and organised", Bairstow is not. He is unpredictable in his methods because he is "spontaneous and instinctive", though Ramprakash acknowledges that Bairstow's method is "no less valid" than his own. While Bairstow is capable of playing defensively to keep his wicket intact, Ramprakash feels that he is at his best when he can take "the aggressive option" and attack the bowling.

== Media ==
In 2017, Bairstow published an autobiography titled A Clear Blue Sky, co-written with Duncan Hamilton. The title recalls the moment when he scored his first Test century at Newlands and looked up to see "a clear blue sky" as he remembered his father.

Preceded by Inaugural award	Young Wisden Schools Cricketer of the Year; 2008	Succeeded by James Taylor
