= Grafton, North Yorkshire =

Village in North Yorkshire, England

Coordinates: 54°03′51″N 1°21′50″W

Grafton
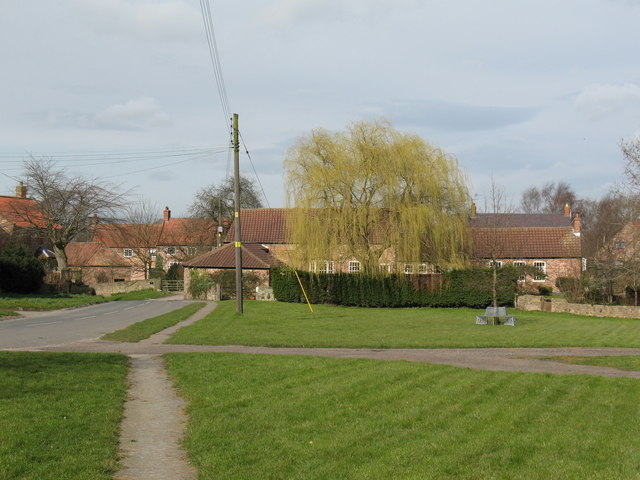
- Village green

- Location within North Yorkshire
- OS grid reference: SE416633
- Civil parish: Marton cum Grafton
- Unitary authority: North Yorkshire
- Ceremonial county: North Yorkshire
- Region: Yorkshire and the Humber
- Country: England
- Sovereign state: United Kingdom
- Post town: YORK
- Postcode district: YO51
- Police: North Yorkshire
- Fire: North Yorkshire
- Ambulance: Yorkshire

Grafton is a village in the county of North Yorkshire, England. It is situated approximately 15 miles (24 km) north-west of the city of York and 6 miles (9.7 km) north-east of the market town of Knaresborough. The village is joined with Marton and forms the civil parish of Marton cum Grafton.

Grafton was first mentioned in the Domesday Book in 1086. The toponym is from the Old English grāf and tūn, meaning "farmstead in the wood".

From 1974 to 2023 it was part of the Borough of Harrogate, it is now administered by the unitary North Yorkshire Council.

== See also ==
- Listed buildings in Marton cum Grafton
