= St Martin's Church, Allerton Mauleverer =

Coordinates: 54.0159°N 1.3668°W

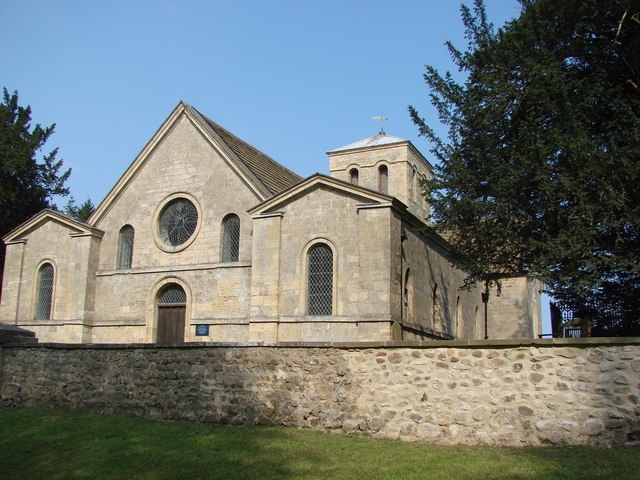
- West end of St Martin's Church, Allerton Mauleverer

- Location in North Yorkshire
- OS grid reference: SE 415 579
- Location: Allerton Mauleverer, North Yorkshire
- Country: England
- Denomination: Anglican
- Website: Churches Conservation Trust

History
- Founder: Richard Arundell

Architecture
- Functional status: Redundant
- Heritage designation: Grade II*
- Designated: 15 March 1966
- Architectural type: Church
- Style: Norman revival
- Groundbreaking: 1745; 281 years ago
- Completed: 1746; 280 years ago

Specifications
- Materials: Limestone

St Martin's Church is a historic Anglican church in the village of Allerton Mauleverer, North Yorkshire, England. It is recorded in the National Heritage List for England as a designated Grade II* listed building, and is under the care of The Churches Conservation Trust. It is sited just outside Allerton Park, the grounds of Allerton Castle, which has been the home of the Mauleverer family for nearly 700 years. See 'External Links' below for a survey of the burial grounds.

== History ==
A church dedicated to Saint Martin was first built on the site by a member of the Mauleverer family in the late 12th or early 13th century. The present church was remodelled in 1745–46 for Richard Arundell, heir to the Mauleverers and MP for Knaresborough. St Martin's was declared redundant on 1 December 1971, and was vested in the Trust on 27 July 1973.

== Architecture ==
=== Exterior ===
St Martin's is constructed in ashlar on its west front, and in coursed limestone elsewhere. It is roofed in stone slates, and the architectural style is Norman revival. Its plan consists of a six-bay nave with north and south aisles and transepts, and a two-bay chancel. Between the nave and chancel is a central tower. At the west front are three gables at the ends of the nave and the aisles. The nave has a central round-headed doorway, over which is a circular window. On each side of this window is a round-headed window. The west fronts of the aisles protrude slightly forward from the nave, and each contains a round-headed window between two pilasters. Along the sides of the church are four round-headed windows, and the windows in the transepts have two lights. The east window has five lights and is in Perpendicular style. The tower has three stages; in the top stage are two round-headed bell openings on each side. On the tower is a pyramidal roof with a weather vane.

=== Interior ===
Inside the church is a vase-shaped font, a two-decker pulpit with a sounding board, and panelled box pews. Between the nave and the chancel, and between the nave and the transepts, are iron gates. The church has a hammerbeam roof and on the chancel arch is a painting of Moses and Aaron. In the north transepts are four effigies; two of these are in wood depicting knights with crossed legs dating from the late 13th or the early 14th century; the other two are in alabaster, dated 1475, and represent Sir John Mauleverer and his wife. In the south transept is the large tomb of Mrs Mary Thornton who died in 1800.

== See also ==
- Grade II* listed churches in North Yorkshire (district)
- Listed buildings in Allerton Mauleverer with Hopperton
- List of churches preserved by the Churches Conservation Trust in Northern England
