= Allerton Castle =

Listed building in North Yorkshire, England

Coordinates: 54.01715°N 1.36983°W

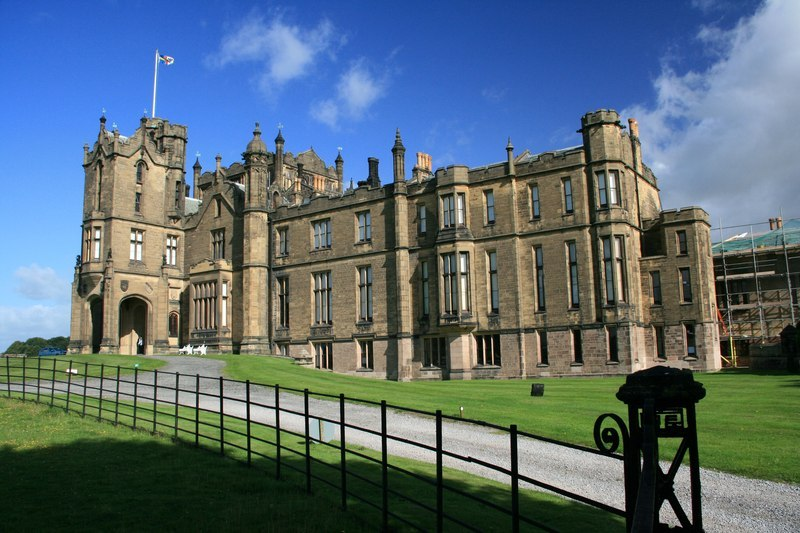
The mansion of Allerton Castle in August 2013

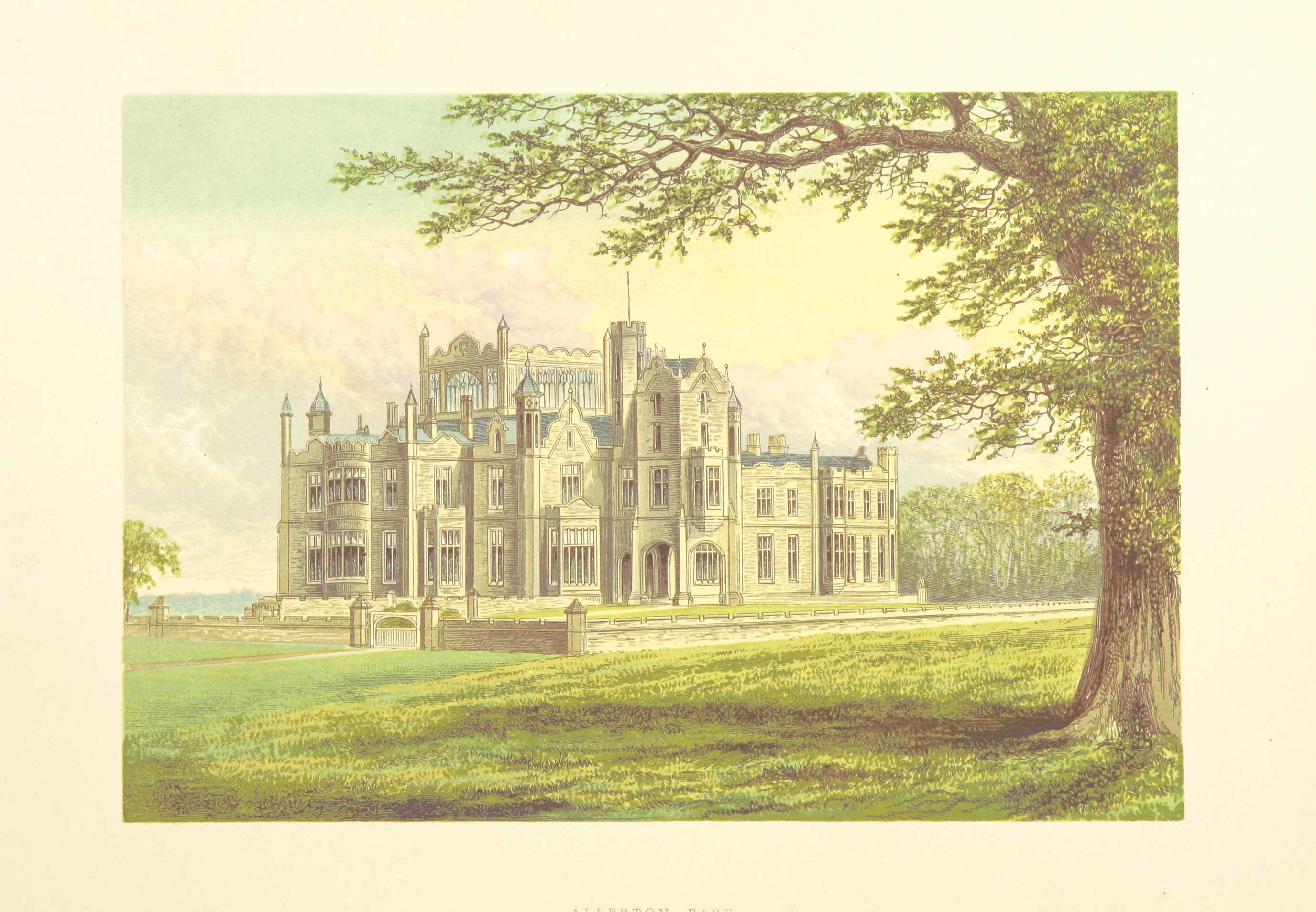
1868 view of Allerton Castle, from The County Seats of the Noblemen and Gentlemen of Great Britain and Ireland by Francis Orpen Morris.

Allerton Castle, also known as Allerton Park, is a Grade I listed nineteenth-century Gothic or Victorian Gothic house at Allerton Mauleverer in North Yorkshire, England. It was rebuilt by architect George Martin, of Baker Street, London in 1843–1853.

It is ten miles (16 km) east of Harrogate and just east of the A1(M), at its junction with the A59 York-Knaresborough road and a late 20th-century block used for education and corporate functions.

Outside is St Martin's Church, Allerton Mauleverer.

== History ==
=== Pre-1786 ===
The Allerton estate belonged to the Mauleverer family from the time of the Norman Conquest.

Arundell remodelled the church in Norman revival style in 1745. The interior of the church remains unaltered to this day.

=== "The Grand Old Duke of York" ===
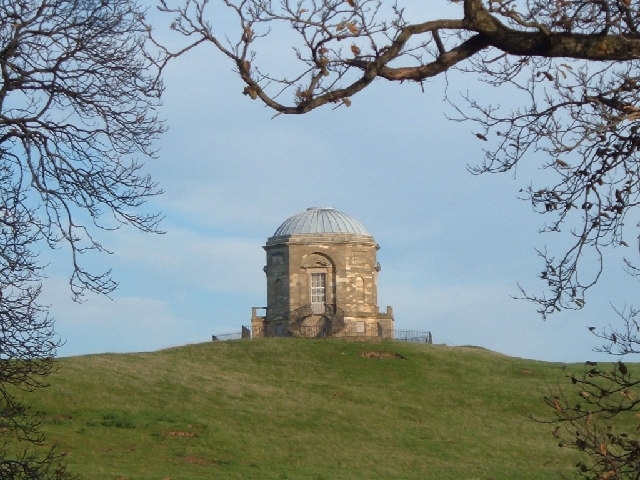
The Temple of Victory

Following Richard Arundell's death in 1758, Allerton passed to his widow Lady Frances Arundell and on her death in 1769 to her nephew Viscount Galway. His son Robert Monckton-Arundell, the 4th Viscount, rebuilt the house about 1780 to designs attributed to William Lindley, but he sold it in 1786 to Prince Frederick, Duke of York, second son of George III and brother of George IV.

The Duke of York employed Henry Holland in 1788 to remodel the interior of the house, but sold the estate to Thomas Thornton shortly afterwards in 1789.

=== 1805–1983 ===
The Hon Edward Stourton's family owned the house from 1805 to 1983 (the Lords Mowbray). The contents were sold in 1965.

The house was used by the Royal Canadian Air Force during the Second World War (for the headquarters of RAF Bomber Command's No. 6 Group RCAF) and in 1965.

The family ceased to live there after the death of the 22nd Baron Stourton.

=== 1983–present ===
In 1983 the house was sold to Dr Gerald Rolph, an American businessman. The purchase included the house and gardens, but not the surrounding park which was retained by Lord Mowbray.

The estate is now run by the Gerald Arthur Rolph Foundation for Historic Preservation and Education, and rooms are available to hire for corporate events and weddings.

A severe fire in January 2005 caused substantial damage to the north aspect of the castle, including the main dining room, library, rear entrance hall, two bedrooms and adjoining dressing rooms and bathrooms and the Servants' Wing. Restoration work commenced in the spring of 2006 and is now more or less complete. The restoration work by specialist contractors consisted of substantial repairs to the ornate stonework and windows, the installation of new floors at first, second and attic levels, significant steelwork, and a new roof structure to match the existing roof. Electrical, plumbing and heating installations as well as plasterwork were also renewed.

== St Mary's Chapel ==
The chapel was added in 1807, and was probably designed by Peter Atkinson, in the Gothic style. It is constructed of a mixture of brown and cream brick, and has a slate roof. It has a three-bay nave, a crossing, and a one-bay chancel. The windows are lancets, and there are three blind lancets at the east end. The entrance is at the west end, directly from the house, and above it is a balcony with access directly from the master bedroom. The chapel was grade II* listed in 1985.

== In popular culture ==
Film and television production filmed at the estate include fantasy film The Secret Garden (1993), the BBC series The ABC Murders, ITV series Victoria, and Bollywood film Shandaar.

The 2020 Europe's Strongest Man competition was held in the estate.

== See also ==
- Grade I listed buildings in North Yorkshire (district)
- Listed buildings in Allerton Mauleverer with Hopperton
