= Steven Griffiths (cricketer) =

English cricketer (born 1973)

Steven Paul Griffiths (born 31 May 1973 at Hereford) was an English first-class cricketer. He was a right-handed batsman and wicket-keeper who played for Derbyshire between 1995 and 1999. He also played for the Second XI of Somerset early in his career.

Griffiths was released in 1999 and replaced by Luke Sutton.

Steve then moved to Kingswood School
