= Allerton Mauleverer =

Village near Knaresborough, North Yorkshire, England

Coordinates: 54.01628°N 1.36687°W

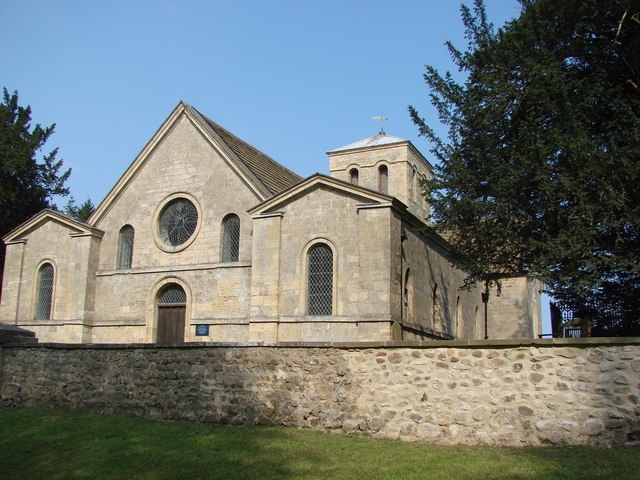
- West end of St Martin's Church, Allerton Mauleverer

- Location within North Yorkshire
- OS grid reference: SE415579
- Civil parish: Allerton Mauleverer with Hopperton
- Unitary authority: North Yorkshire
- Ceremonial county: North Yorkshire
- Region: Yorkshire and the Humber
- Country: England
- Sovereign state: United Kingdom
- Post town: KNARESBOROUGH
- Postcode district: HG5
- Dialling code: 01423
- Police: North Yorkshire
- Fire: North Yorkshire
- Ambulance: Yorkshire
- UK Parliament: Harrogate and Knaresborough

Allerton Mauleverer is a village in North Yorkshire, England. It is part of the Allerton Mauleverer with Hopperton parish. The parish lies just 5 miles (8 km) east of the town of Knaresborough. The A1(M) runs through the area connecting London and Edinburgh.

From 1947 to 1998, Allerton Mauleverer was part of the Claro Registration District, until it was abolished. Until 1974 it was part of the West Riding of Yorkshire. From 1974 to 2023 it was part of the Borough of Harrogate, it is now administered by the unitary North Yorkshire Council.

In the 1870s, John Marius Wilson's Imperial Gazetteer of England and Wales described Allerton Mauleverer as

"a township and a parish in Knaresborough district, W. R. Yorkshire. The township includes Hopperton; and lies on an affluent of the Nidd, at the Allerton r. station, 4 1/2 miles [7 km] ENE of Knaresborough."

The name Allerton Mauleverer originally meant "Aelfweard's farm/settlement". Referring to farm held by the Mauleverer family in the 12th century.

== History ==
Allerton obtained its distinguishing name from the family of Mauleverer, one of whom was named Richard. Although the family claimed to have come over with William the Conqueror, this is now believed to be based on a forged family tree of 1591. In the 1840s, Allerton Mauleverer was described as "The parish is wholly the property of Lord Stourton; and comprises 2170 acres, of which 1180 are arable, 820 meadow and pasture, and 170 woodland and plantations."

In 1086, King William was the lord of Allerton Mauleverer. At this period of time, the value to the Lord was £0.5 with a taxable value of 1.5 geld units, where in the same year the "Tenant-in-chief was also King William. In about 1105, Richard Mauleverer granted the church and some lands at Allerton to Holy Trinity Church of York.

During the Second World War, Allerton Castle, then home to Lord Mowbray, became the Headquarters of the Sixth Group of RAF Bomber Command which was the Royal Canadian Air Force component of the command.

== St Martin's Church ==
A church dedicated to Saint Martin was first built on the site by a member of the Mauleverer family in the late 12th or early 13th century. The present church was remodelled in 1745–46 by Richard Arundell, heir to the Mauleverers and MP for Knaresborough, adopting a neo-Norman style. St Martin's Church, Allerton Mauleverer was declared redundant on 1 December 1971, and was vested in the Trust on 27 July 1973.

In 1848, St Martin's Church was described as "an ancient cruciform structure. The late Duke of York resided here in 1786, 1787, and 1789."

Also in 1985, the Churchyard Wall and the Piers of the Church were awarded as Grade II listed buildings, and is currently under the care of the Churches Conservation Trust.

There are two burial grounds next to the church. One, which is only accessible from the west end of the site next to the road, is reserved for Roman Catholic burials. See 'External links' below for a survey of burials in both churchyards.

== Temple of Victory ==
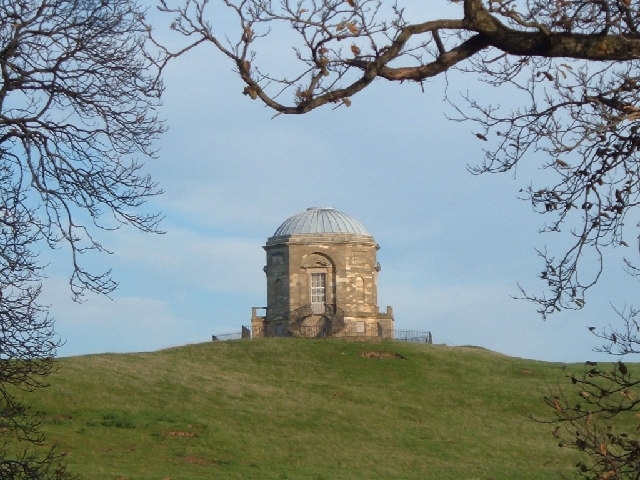
The Temple, Allerton Park

The Temple of Victory is a folly gazebo in a prominent position – on a hill in the parish of Flaxby, now close to the A1 road. It is built of stone, with an eaves cornice, a plain parapet and a lead-domed roof. It has an octagonal plan with one storey on a basement. On three sides of the basement are doorways with fanlights and wrought iron balconies. The main entrance is on the southwest side and is approached by two flights of steps with wrought iron railings, and it has a shouldered architrave and a triangular pediment on consoles, all in a round-headed arch. There is a similar arch on the northeast side, two sides between have windows with architraves, and all these sides have balconies. The sides between these contain round-arched recesses and rectangular plaques. Surrounding the building are wrought iron railings on a stone plinth and two gates. The basement is divided into two rooms. The building was grade II* listed in 1966, but was heavily vandalised. A local legend claims that its construction atop a hill inspired the nursery rhyme, "The Grand Old Duke of York".

== Population ==
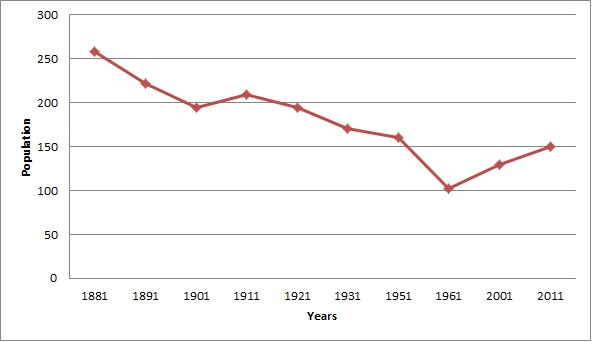
Population of Allerton-Mauleverer, 1881 to 2011

As the graph shows, in 1881 the Parish of Allerton Mauleverer with Hopperton had a population of over 250. But since then, the number of residents have gradually declined constantly until 1911. This as shown has fluctuated over time with its most significant decrease in the 1950s. There are reasons for this decline in population in the mid 19th century. One reasons is due to the growth of industrial districts in Lancashire and the North-East in the mid 19th century, where cotton textiles were produced. This caused the majority of small parishes in North Yorkshire to see a decline in residents because citizens moved to the industrial areas to look for a better life. The population also reflects the major decline in residents, from 160 in 1951 to 100 in 1961, due to the change in parish boundaries during the 1950s.

=== Occupation structure ===
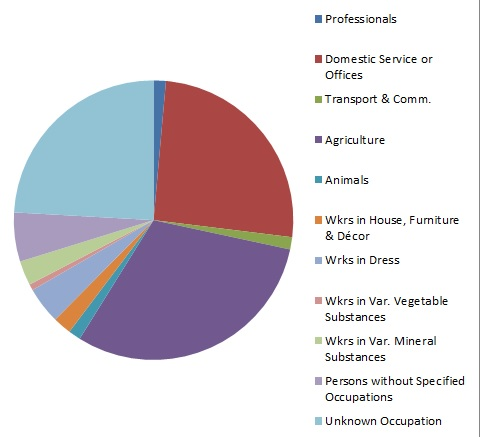
Occupational Structure of Allerton Mauleverer in 1881

The pie chart below shows the occupational structure of Allerton Mauleverer in 1881. The graph below shows that the majority of occupations were of domestic service or offices and agriculture industry. The pie chart also shows a large proportion in unknown occupations.

=== Age structure ===
The village has an ageing population, 49.3% of the population are 45 years old or over. Only 16% of the population are 15 years old or less. This shows that the population is ageing. Because of the low population of young people in the village, the population need to travel a distance to the nearest schools: Queen Ethelburga's Collegiate (3.1 miles), King James's school (3.9 miles) and Boroughbridge High School (4.8 miles). According to the 2001 census, the average distance travelled, by the local population, to a fixed place of work is 39.8 km. This shows that present day, the population have to commute to work to places such as Harrogate or York.

== Geology ==
The area is mostly formed by superficial deposits such as Diamiction. The bedrock contains mostly sandstone formed in the Triassic and Permian periods, when the local environment was previously dominated by rivers.

== Services ==
Whilst Allerton Mauleverer does not have direct access to a Post Office within immediate vicinity, the nearest Post Office is of that in Green Hammerton. Also, the village does not have direct access to a railway station, the nearest station is Cattal railway station (2.3 miles south-east). It is located on the Harrogate line 10.5 miles west of York.

== Places of interest ==
There is also a golf course nearby (2.6 miles), the Flaxby Golf & Country resort, which features a par 72 18-hole course nearly 7,000 yards long. Within the golf club, an associated four star hotel and spa offer first class facilities for both members and visitors. (Now closed – 2017)

In Allerton Mauleverer itself, is Allerton Castle which has been described as "England's grandest and most elegant gothic revival stately home." Built by The Lord Mowbray, the premier Baron of England as a monumental statement of his position within the English aristocracy. Since the 1990s, Allerton Castle has been the location for many film and television productions including The Secret Garden and Sherlock Holmes – The Sign of Four.

== See also ==
- Listed buildings in Allerton Mauleverer with Hopperton
