= Arkendale =

Village and civil parish in North Yorkshire, England

Coordinates: 54°02′37″N 1°24′33″W

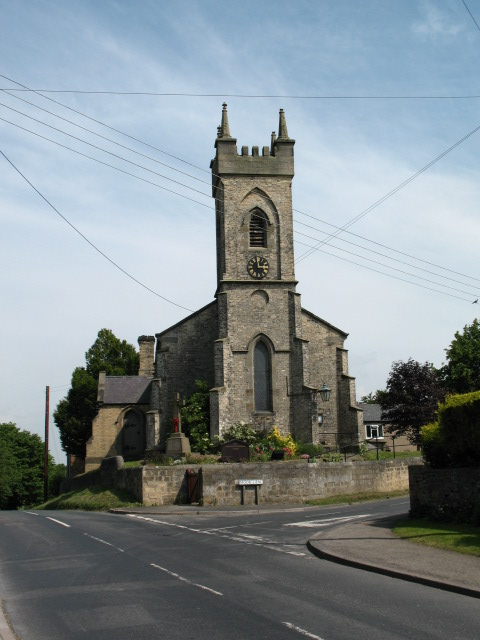
- St Bartholomew's Church, Arkendale

- Location within North Yorkshire
- Population: 394 (2011 census)
- OS grid reference: SE387610
- Unitary authority: North Yorkshire
- Ceremonial county: North Yorkshire
- Region: Yorkshire and the Humber
- Country: England
- Sovereign state: United Kingdom
- Post town: KNARESBOROUGH
- Postcode district: HG5
- Police: North Yorkshire
- Fire: North Yorkshire
- Ambulance: Yorkshire

Arkendale is a village and civil parish in the county of North Yorkshire, England. It is 6 miles (10 km) north-east of Harrogate, and its population of 278 at the 2001 census, increased to 394 at the 2011 census. It has a public house, a village hall and a church.

== Name ==
The first part of the toponym likely originates from Old English eorcnan, probably meaning "precious, noble, true", as in the name Archibald. It may perhaps be derived from arkedenu meaning 'chest valley', used topographically. The Old English denu was replaced by the Old Norse dalr, of the same meaning.

== Governance ==
Arkendale was a chapelry in the ecclesiastical parish of Knaresborough in the Claro Wapentake. It remained in the West Riding of Yorkshire until 1974. From 1974 to 2023 it was part of the Borough of Harrogate in North Yorkshire, it is now administered by the unitary North Yorkshire Council.

== Geography ==
Arkendale village is four miles north east of Knaresborough and eight miles from Boroughbridge. The chapelry covered 1516 acres of mostly arable land, the rest meadow, pasture and a small amount of woodland. The land is undulating and the higher parts command extensive views. The village is a mile east from the old Great North Road (now the A1M) between Boroughbridge and Wetherby and a mile north of the Knaresborough to York road (A59). Nearby villages are Staveley to the northwest, Marton cum Grafton to the northeast, Coneythorpe to the south and Ferrensby to the east.

== Religion ==
St Bartholomew's Church which replaced an earlier chapel was built in 1836, at a cost of about £750. raised by subscription and a grant of £100 from the Incorporated Society. It is built in the 'lancet style' of the Gothic revival, in white brick with limestone ashlar, in contrast to the traditional brown local brick of the village. The architect was John Freeman. The church replaced a mediaeval building on the same site. The vestry on the north side was added in 1888, at which time the church was refitted 'by the munificence of Samuel James Brown' of Loftuss Hill, an act commemorated by the stained glass window at the east end.

== See also ==
- Listed buildings in Arkendale
