= Marton, Harrogate =

Village in North Yorkshire, England

Coordinates: 54°03′34″N 1°21′52″W

Marton
- Location within North Yorkshire
- Population: 503 (2011 census)
- OS grid reference: SE417628
- Civil parish: Marton cum Grafton
- Unitary authority: North Yorkshire
- Ceremonial county: North Yorkshire
- Region: Yorkshire and the Humber
- Country: England
- Sovereign state: United Kingdom
- Post town: YORK
- Postcode district: YO51
- Police: North Yorkshire
- Fire: North Yorkshire
- Ambulance: Yorkshire

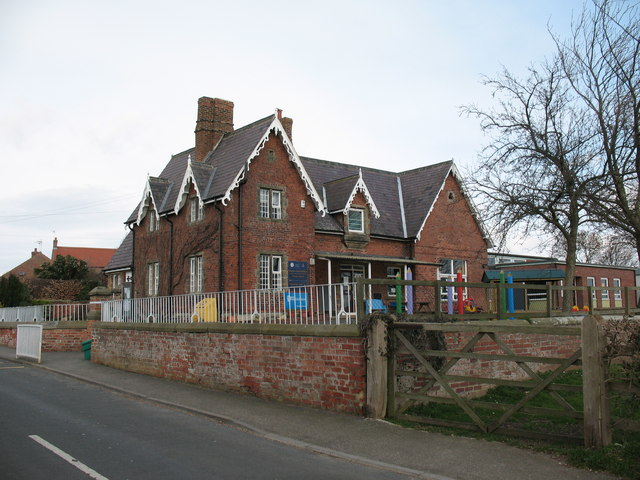
Marton village school

Marton is a village in the county of North Yorkshire, England. It is situated approximately 15 miles (24 km) north-west of the city of York and 6 miles (9.7 km) north-east of the market town of Knaresborough. The village is joined with Grafton and it forms the civil parish of Marton cum Grafton.

From 1974 to 2023 it was part of the Borough of Harrogate, it is now administered by the unitary North Yorkshire Council.

== Village pub ==
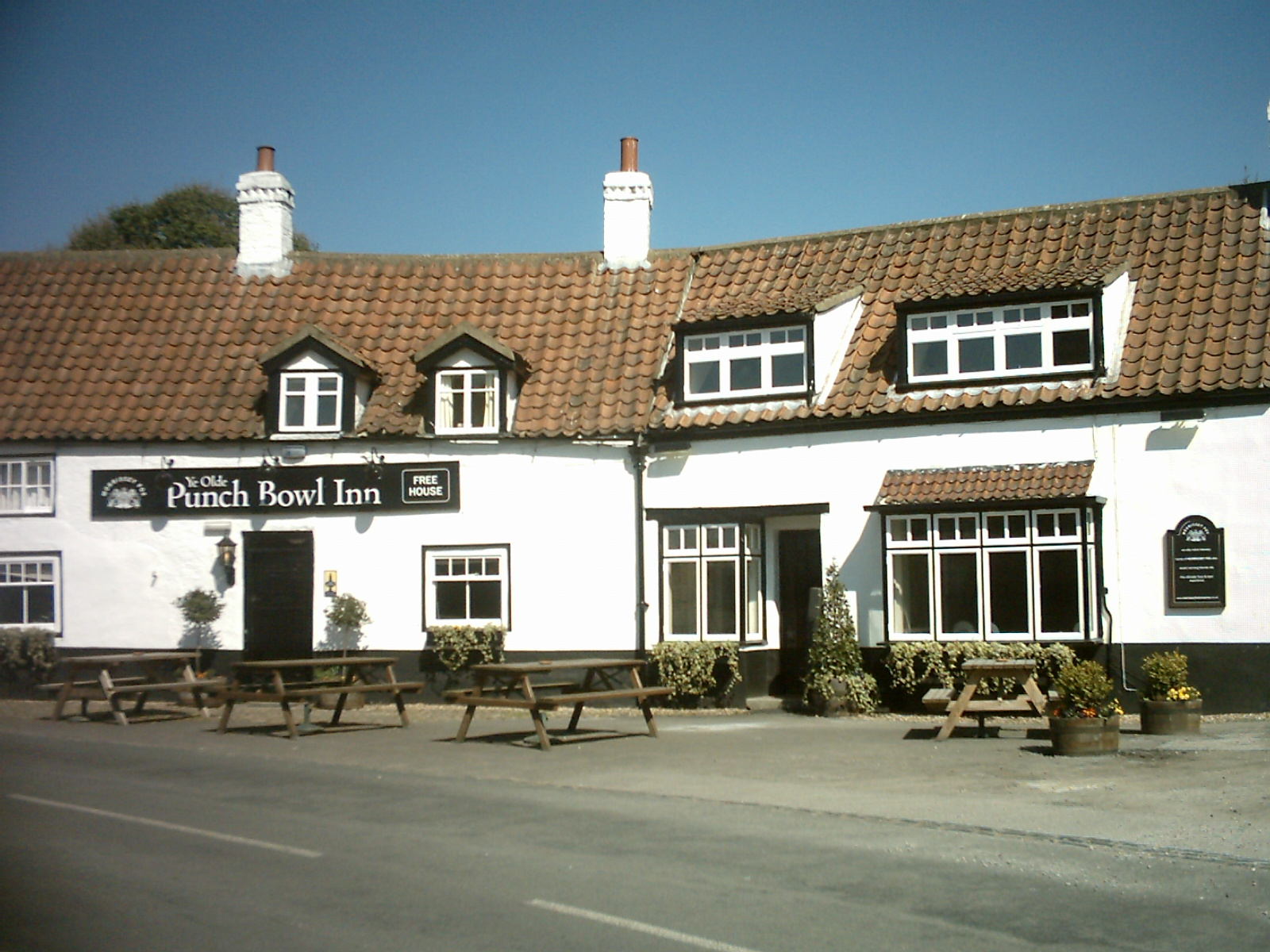

The village public house is called Ye Olde Punch Bowl Inn, a sixteenth-century inn which still contains a number of original features. The lease was part owned by Neil Morrissey until the business went into liquidation on 22 October 2009. The original experience of buying the lease and setting up the pub/microbrewery were turned into a TV programme Neil Morrissey's Risky Business which aired late 2008 on Channel 4.

== History ==
There is an active village history group which is engaged in a number of activities as detailed on its website.

In 2007 a Roman lead coffin burial was discovered very close to the village, which was widely reported in the local and national press: the village history group intend to use the location of this burial as the starting point for an extended search for the Roman villa which they believe is certainly associated with it.

The village school was founded in 1861.

== See also ==
- Listed buildings in Marton cum Grafton
