= 2016–17 Plunket Shield season =

Cricket tournament

2016–17 Plunket Shield
- Dates: 22 October 2016 – 1 April 2017
- Cricket format: First-class
- Tournament format(s): Round-robin
- Champions: Canterbury (19th title)
- Participants: 6
- Matches: 30
- Most runs: Brad Wilson (730)
- Most wickets: Ajaz Patel (44)

The 2016–17 Plunket Shield was the 91st season of official first-class cricket in New Zealand. The competition started on 22 October 2016, and ran to 1 April 2017. The round seven fixtures that started in early March 2017, were played as day/night matches. These were in preparation for a possible day/night Test match between New Zealand and England, scheduled to take place in March 2018. Despite some concerns about the visibility of the pink ball while catching, the matches received positive feedback.

In the first round of matches, Michael Papps playing for Wellington, became the first player to score 10,000 runs in the Plunket Shield. The start of the round four fixture between Wellington and Central Districts was delayed because of a 7.8 magnitude earthquake that struck New Zealand on 14 November 2016. It was later abandoned because of frequent aftershocks in the area.

Canterbury won the tournament, their 19th title in the competition, and their third win in the last four years.

== Points table ==
Team	Pld	W	L	D	Ab	Pts
Canterbury	10	4	4	2	0	105
Northern Districts	10	4	2	4	0	103
Auckland	10	3	3	4	0	98
Wellington	10	2	2	5	1	86
Central Districts	10	2	1	6	1	79
Otago	10	1	4	5	0	60

Winner

== Teams ==
Team	Home Ground(s)
Northern Districts	Seddon Park, Cobham Oval, Harry Barker Reserve
Auckland	Eden Park No.2
Central Districts	Nelson Park, McLean Park, Saxton Oval
Wellington	Basin Reserve, Karori Park, Westpac Stadium
Canterbury	Mainpower Oval, Hagley Oval
Otago	Queen's Park, University Oval

== Squads ==
Prior to the start of the season, the following squads were announced:

Auckland	Canterbury	Central Districts	Northern Districts	Otago	Wellington
Cody Andrews; Brad Cachopa; Mark Chapman; Colin de Grandhomme; Lockie Ferguson; Donovan Grobbelaar; Michael Guptill-Bunce; Shawn Hicks; Dane Hutchinson; Tarun Nethula; Rob Nicol; Robert O'Donnell; Glenn Phillips; Jeet Raval; Sean Solia	Todd Astle; Jeremy Benton; Leo Carter; Michael Davidson; Andrew Ellis; Cameron Fletcher; Peter Fulton; Kyle Jamieson; Timothy Johnston; Kenneth McClure; Cole McConchie; Edward Nuttall; Henry Shipley; Logan van Beek; Will Williams	Tom Bruce; Dane Cleaver; Greg Hay; Marty Kain; Andrew Mathieson; Ryan McCone; Ajaz Patel; Navin Patel; Seth Rance; Jesse Ryder; Bevan Small; Ben Smith; Blair Tickner; Ben Wheeler; William Young	James Baker; Jono Boult; Dean Brownlie; Joe Carter; Anton Devcich; Daniel Flynn; Zak Gibson; Tony Goodin; Brett Hampton; Nick Kelly; Scott Kuggeleijn; Daryl Mitchell; Bharat Popli; Tim Seifert; Josef Walker	Warren Barnes; Michael Bracewell; Derek de Boorder; Jacob Duffy; Ryan Duffy; Sean Eathorne; Josh Finnie; Jack Hunter; Anaru Kitchen; Rhys Phillips; Michael Rae; Hamish Rutherford; Christi Viljeon; Sam Wells; Brad Wilson	Brent Arnel; Hamish Bennett; Tom Blundell; Fraser Colson; Matt McEwan; Ian McPeake; Stephen Murdoch; Ollie Newton; Michael Papps; Jeetan Patel; Michael Pollard; Matt Taylor; Anurag Verma; Luke Woodcock; Peter Younghusband

== Fixtures ==
=== Round 1 ===
22–25 October 2016
Scorecard

Otago	v	Central Districts
479/5d (142 overs); Hamish Rutherford 143 (176); Ajaz Patel 2/144 (43 overs)		365/5d (104 overs); Greg Hay 136 (267); Christi Viljoen 3/84 (27 overs)
238/2 (74 overs); Brad Wilson 117* (226); Ben Wheeler 1/40 (12 overs)

Match drawn
Saxton Oval, Nelson
Umpires: Billy Bowden and Shaun Haig

- Otago won the toss and elected to bat.

22–25 October 2016
Scorecard

Canterbury	v	Northern Districts
445 (96.1 overs); Todd Astle 195 (189); Scott Kuggeleijn 3/130 (28.1 overs)		415 (146.1 overs); Dean Brownlie 104 (196); Andrew Ellis 2/46 (21 overs)
165 (48.5 overs); Tim Johnston 43 (29); Scott Kuggeleijn 6/60 (17.5 overs)		198/5 (63.2 overs); Daryl Mitchell 51* (107); Andrew Ellis 2/35 (17 overs)

Northern Districts won by 5 wickets
Hagley Oval, Christchurch
Umpires: Ashley Mehrotra and Tim Parlane

- Northern Districts won the toss and elected to field.
- Henry Shipley (Canterbury) made his first-class debut.

22–25 October 2016
Scorecard

Auckland	v	Wellington
269 (75.4 overs); Michael Guptill-Bunce 50 (69); Brent Arnel 4/57 (22 overs)		273 (87.3 overs); Stephen Murdoch 109 (184); Lachie Ferguson 5/44 (19.3 overs)
278 (90.1 overs); Rob Nicol 49 (153); Brent Arnel 4/47 (22.1 overs)		275/4 (70.4 overs); Luke Woodcock 98 (235); Dane Hutchinson 2/44 (12 overs)

Wellington won by 6 wickets
Bay Oval, Mount Maunganui
Umpires: Tony Gillies and Derek Walker

- Wellington won the toss and elected to field.

=== Round 2 ===
29 October–1 November 2016
Scorecard

Northern Districts	v	Wellington
285 (84.1 overs); Scott Kuggeleijn 112 (130); Hamish Bennett 5/54 (17.1 overs)		376/8d (109.3 overs); Luke Woodcock 120 (261); James Baker 3/90 (29 overs)
156/6 (78 overs); Nick Kelly 40* (91); Ian McPeake 2/16 (12 overs)

Match drawn
Basin Reserve, Wellington
Umpires: Billy Bowden and Ashley Mehrotra

- Wellington won the toss and elected to field.

29 October–1 November 2016
Scorecard

Canterbury	v	Central Districts
202 (82 overs); Todd Astle 53 (137); Ajaz Patel 5/41 (20 overs)		399 (109.3 overs); Dane Cleaver 104 (180); Tim Johnston 3/62 (21 overs)
354 (135.4 overs); Henry Nicholls 98 (205); Ajaz Patel 5/118 (53 overs)		86 (29 overs); Mitch Renwick 37* (93); Todd Astle 5/36 (12 overs)

Canterbury won by 71 runs
Hagley Oval, Christchurch
Umpires: Phil Jones and Derek Walker

- Central Districts won the toss and elected to field.

29 October–1 November 2016
Scorecard

Otago	v	Auckland
164 (72.3 overs); Brad Wilson 56 (127); Tarun Nethula 6/36 (15.3 overs)		145 (59.2 overs); Brad Cachopa 43 (87); Neil Wagner 5/55 (15 overs)
353 (91 overs); Neil Broom 161 (226); Tarun Nethula 4/88 (25 overs)		376/8 (97.2 overs); Colin de Grandhomme 144* (147); Christi Viljoen 5/101 (26.2 overs)

Auckland won by 2 wickets
Eden Park No 2, Auckland
Umpires: Tony Gillies and Tim Parlane

- Auckland won the toss and elected to field.

=== Round 3 ===
5–8 November 2016
Scorecard

Otago	v	Central Districts
402 (118.5 overs); Anaru Kitchen 133 (180); Doug Bracewell 3/58 (19 overs)		216 (78.4 overs); Tom Bruce 83 (126); Neil Wagner 3/38 (20 overs)
213/7d (39.3 overs); Hamish Rutherford 110 (107); Ajaz Patel 3/94 (13 overs)		266/7 (103 overs); Tom Bruce 55 (65); James Neesham 3/23 (11 overs)

Match drawn
University Oval, Dunedin
Umpires: Tony Gillies and Ashley Mehrotra

- Otago won the toss and elected to bat.
- Christian Leopard (Central Districts) made his first-class debut.

5–8 November 2016
Scorecard

Northern Districts	v	Canterbury
138 (29.5 overs); Anton Devcich 37 (27); Kyle Jamieson 4/32 (9 overs)		112 (35 overs); Henry Shipley 30 (21); Tim Southee 5/39 (12 overs)
181 (63.1 overs); Daryl Mitchell 44 (97); Todd Astle 3/20 (5.1 overs)		186 (67.1 overs); Michael Davidson 45 (106); Ish Sodhi 3/66 (19 overs)

Northern Districts won by 21 runs
Seddon Park, Hamilton
Umpires: Wayne Knights and Brad White

- Canterbury won the toss and elected to field.

5–8 November 2016
Scorecard

Wellington	v	Auckland
475/8d (122 overs); Luke Woodcock 203* (366); Colin de Grandhomme 3/50 (21 overs)		374 (99.3 overs); Michael Guptill-Bunce 109 (139); Matt McEwan 4/80 (24 overs)
240/9d (54 overs); Hamish Marshall 73 (109); Tarun Nethula 5/71 (13 overs)		276/6 (65 overs); Martin Guptill 128* (191); Jeetan Patel 3/65 (25 overs)

Match drawn
Eden Park No 2, Auckland
Umpires: Chris Brown and Shaun Haig

- Auckland won the toss and elected to field.
- Cody Andrews (Auckland) made his first-class debut.

=== Round 4 ===
14–17 November 2016
Scorecard

Northern Districts	v	Auckland
417/7d (107 overs); Dean Brownlie 143 (268); Lachie Ferguson 3/70 (25 overs)		348 (63 overs); Martin Guptill 151 (138); Daryl Mitchell 4/39 (7 overs)
110/5 (34.5 overs); Corey Anderson 46* (96); Lachie Ferguson 3/19 (11 overs)

Match drawn
Bay Oval, Mount Maunganui
Umpires: Phil Jones and Derek Walker

- Auckland won the toss and elected to field.

14–17 November 2016
Scorecard

Wellington	v	Central Districts

Match abandoned
Basin Reserve, Wellington

- No toss.
- The match was abandoned due to an earthquake that struck the region the previous day.

14–17 November 2016
Scorecard

Canterbury	v	Otago
446/6d (98.1 overs); Andrew Ellis 196 (159); Michael Rae 4/112 (26.1 overs)

Match drawn
Queen's Park, Invercargill
Umpires: Billy Bowden and Chris Brown

- Otago won the toss and elected to field.

=== Round 5 ===
22–25 November 2016
Scorecard

Otago	v	Wellington
208 (67.4 overs); Michael Bracewell 43 (101); Jeetan Patel 6/55 (26.4 overs)		350/7d (84.3 overs); Luke Ronchi 119* (109); James Neesham 2/68 (14 overs)

Match drawn
University Oval, Dunedin
Umpires: R. G. Hooper and Derek Walker

- Otago won the toss and elected to bat.

22–25 November 2016
Scorecard

Central Districts	v	Northern Districts
225 (78.3 overs); Will Young 61 (110); Brett Hampton 3/36 (14 overs)		153 (73.2 overs); Tim Seifert 35 (147); Ajaz Patel 5/22 (17.2 overs)
377/5d (86 overs); Tom Bruce 115 (128); Ish Sodhi 2/120 (30 overs)		295/7 (129 overs); Bharat Popli 60 (189); Seth Rance 2/27 (21 overs)

Match drawn
Nelson Park, Napier
Umpires: Chris Brown and Phil Jones

- Central Districts won the toss and elected to bat.
- Henry Cooper (Northern Districts) made his first-class debut.

22–25 November 2016
Scorecard

Canterbury	v	Auckland
245 (74.3 overs); Ken McClure 47 (97); Lachie Ferguson 3/51 (17 overs)		285 (85.5 overs); Colin Munro 108* (86); Kyle Jamieson 8/74 (16.5 overs)
400/7d (96 overs); Chad Bowes 155 (207); Tarun Nethula 5/128 (35 overs)		350 (80.2 overs); Mark Chapman 81 (106); Edward Nuttall 5/67 (17 overs)

Canterbury won by 10 runs
Mainpower Oval, Rangiora
Umpires: Wayne Knights and Tim Parlane

- Auckland won the toss and elected to field.
- Sean Solia (Auckland) and Jack Boyle (Canterbury) both made their first-class debuts.

=== Round 6 ===
25–28 February 2017
Scorecard

Northern Districts	v	Otago
278 (96.4 overs); Tim Seifert 97 (198); Nathan Smith 5/56 (20 overs)		276 (92 overs); Derek de Boorder 89 (202); Scott Kuggeleijn 5/68 (20 overs)
286 (92.4 overs); BJ Watling 96 (215); Jacob Duffy 3/56 (17 overs)		289/5 (73.2 overs); Anaru Kitchen 120* (146); Joe Walker 2/97 (22.2 overs)

Otago won by 5 wickets
Cobham Oval, Whangārei
Umpires: Billy Bowden and Shawn Craig

- Otago won the toss and elected to field.

25–28 February 2017
Scorecard

Auckland	v	Central Districts
385/5d (97 overs); Colin Munro 146 (109); Navin Patel 2/57 (20 overs)		256/7d (84 overs); Tom Bruce 127* (166); Donovan Grobbelaar 2/23 (12 overs)
260/6d (60 overs); Colin Munro 142 (103); Ajaz Patel 3/70 (19 overs)		115/1 (37 overs); Ben Smith 52 (89); Sean Solia 1/10 (4 overs)

Match drawn
Colin Maiden Park, Auckland
Umpires: Tony Gillies and Tim Parlane

- Auckland won the toss and elected to bat.
- No play was possible on day 1.
- Ben Horne, Aniket Parikh and Rajvinder Sandhu (Auckland) all made their first-class debuts.

26 February–1 March 2017
Scorecard

Wellington	v	Canterbury
297 (91.4 overs); Michael Papps 76 (140); Matt Henry 5/62 (26 overs)		243 (81.5 overs); Peter Fulton 79 (150); Anurag Verma 4/39 (16 overs)
269 (101.2 overs); Stephen Murdoch 56 (135); Matt Henry 4/75 (24.2 overs)		325/3 (72.5 overs); Chad Bowes 149 (187); Peter Younghusband 1/46 (8 overs)

Canterbury won by 7 wickets
Basin Reserve, Wellington
Umpires: Ashley Mehrotra and Derek Walker

- Canterbury won the toss and elected to field.
- Peter Younghusband (Wellington) made his first-class debut.

=== Round 7 ===
6–9 March 2017 (D/N)
Scorecard

Canterbury	v	Auckland
305/8d (95 overs); Andrew Ellis 103 (182); Colin Munro 3/40 (13 overs)		333 (100 overs); Ben Horne 93 (133); Todd Astle 5/75 (25 overs)

Match drawn
Eden Park No 1, Auckland
Umpires: Billy Bowden and Wayne Knights

- Canterbury won the toss and elected to bat.
- No play was possible on days 2 and 3.
- Glenn Phillips (Auckland) made his first-class debut.

6–9 March 2017 (D/N)
Scorecard

Central Districts	v	Northern Districts
272/9d (78.4 overs); Greg Hay 90 (156); Ish Sodhi 7/107 (33 overs)		119/9 (54 overs); Tim Seifert 29 (89); Seth Rance 6/31 (17 overs)

Match drawn
Seddon Park, Hamilton
Umpires: Tony Gillies and Ashley Mehrotra

- Central Districts won the toss and elected to bat.
- No play was possible on day 3.

6–9 March 2017 (D/N)
Scorecard

Wellington	v	Otago
302/8d (107.4 overs); Michael Papps 105 (235); Sam Wells 3/40 (11 overs)		98 (43.3 overs); Neil Broom 42 (103); Hamish Bennett 4/19 (10 overs)
304 (117 overs); Sam Wells 118 (219); Brent Arnel 4/64 (35 overs)

Match drawn
Westpac Stadium, Wellington
Umpires: Phil Jones and Tim Parlane

- Otago won the toss and elected to field.
- No play was possible on day 2.

=== Round 8 ===
14–17 March 2017
Scorecard

Wellington	v	Central Districts
245 (78.1 overs); Luke Ronchi 70 (124); Seth Rance 4/61 (18 overs)		382 (125.1 overs); Will Young 124 (226); Matt McEwan 6/81 (31.1 overs)
336 (127.2 overs); Michael Papps 116 (248); Ajaz Patel 5/106 (49.2 overs)		191/9 (39 overs); George Worker 85 (100); Brent Arnel 4/35 (12 overs)

Match drawn
McLean Park, Napier
Umpires: Chris Brown and Garth Stirrat

- Central Districts won the toss and elected to field.

14–17 March 2017
Scorecard

Auckland	v	Northern Districts
461 (120.3 overs); Rajvinder Sandhu 82 (94); Scott Kuggeleijn 4/89 (26 overs)		334 (106.4 overs); Henry Cooper 101 (269); Rajvinder Sandhu 4/29 (16 overs)
202/4d (48.3 overs); Glenn Phillips 109 (142); James Baker 2/27 (11 overs)		258 (75.5 overs); Henry Cooper 83 (172); Tarun Nethula 5/84 (26.5 overs)

Auckland won by 71 runs
Eden Park No 2, Auckland
Umpires: Shaun Haig and Phil Jones

- Auckland won the toss and elected to bat.

14–17 March 2017
Scorecard

Otago	v	Canterbury
140 (71 overs); Brad Wilson 70 (213); Andrew Ellis 6/35 (23 overs)		432/9d (113.4 overs); Chad Bowes 137 (147); Michael Rae 3/114 (28.4 overs)
173 (60.1 overs); Derek de Boorder 50 (123); Logan van Beek 5/43 (17 overs)

Canterbury won by an innings and 119 runs
Hagley Oval, Christchurch
Umpires: John Bromley and Derek Walker

- Canterbury won the toss and elected to field.

=== Round 9 ===
21–24 March 2017
Scorecard

Otago	v	Auckland
282 (97 overs); Derek de Boorder 50 (139); Lockie Ferguson 5/53 (23 overs)		304 (69.4 overs); Colin Munro 102 (85); Michael Rae 4/82 (16.4 overs)
205 (55.1 overs); Anaru Kitchen 108 (101); Rajvinder Sandhu 4/40 (12 overs)		185/2 (29.2 overs); Glenn Phillips 59* (43); Christi Viljoen 1/2 (2 overs)

Auckland won by 8 wickets
University Oval, Dunedin
Umpires: Billy Bowden and Tony Gillies

- Auckland won the toss and elected to field.
- Gregor Croudis (Otago) made his first-class debut.

21–24 March 2017
Scorecard

Wellington	v	Northern Districts
151 (83.1 overs); Fraser Colson 66 (214); Joe Walker 5/46 (26.1 overs)		262 (110.4 overs); Bharat Popli 63 (200); Peter Younghusband 5/89 (28.4 overs)
269 (110.3 overs); Michael Papps 160 (349); Scott Kuggeleijn 3/18 (11 overs)		162/1 (57.1 overs); Dean Brownlie 76* (141); Luke Woodcock 1/15 (14 overs)

Northern Districts won by 9 wickets
Bay Oval, Mount Maunganui
Umpires: Tim Parlane and Derek Walker

- Wellington won the toss and elected to bat.
- Brett Randell (Northern Districts) made his first-class debut.

21–24 March 2017
Scorecard

Canterbury	v	Central Districts
388 (114 overs); Peter Fulton 110 (180); Adam Milne 3/36 (15 overs)		315 (97.1 overs); Will Young 128* (263); Andrew Ellis 4/49 (22.1 overs)
273/8d (69 overs); Cole McConchie 131 (145); Blair Tickner 3/54 (14 overs)		349/6 (86 overs); Jesse Ryder 109* (187); Todd Astle 4/96 (30 overs)

Central Districts won by 4 wickets
Saxton Oval, Nelson
Umpires: John Dempsey and Wayne Knights

- Central Districts won the toss and elected to field.

=== Round 10 ===
29 March–1 April 2017
Scorecard

Auckland	v	Central Districts
200/9d (51.3 overs); Colin Munro 52 (37); Navin Patel 5/71 (19 overs)		181 (85.5 overs); George Worker 41 (116); Tarun Nethula 4/49 (30 overs)
281/7d (48.5 overs); Colin Munro 56 (30); Navin Patel 3/99 (18 overs)		301/7 (68.5 overs); George Worker 130 (144); Sean Solia 2/36 (7 overs)

Central Districts won by 3 wickets
McLean Park, Napier
Umpires: John Dempsey and Ashley Mehrotra

- Central Districts won the toss and elected to field.

29 March–1 April 2017
Scorecard

Canterbury	v	Wellington
197 (64.2 overs); Todd Astle 70 (99); Brent Arnel 3/41 (23 overs)		264 (90.1 overs); Tom Blundell 113 (214); Will Williams 4/37 (20 overs)
293/8d (73 overs); Andrew Ellis 110 (145); Brent Arnel 4/52 (22 overs)		230/3 (47.2 overs); Hamish Marshall 105* (94); Andrew Ellis 1/25 (10 overs)

Wellington won by 7 wickets
Hagley Oval, Christchurch
Umpires: Billy Bowden and Tim Parlane

- Wellington won the toss and elected to field.

29 March–1 April 2017
Scorecard

Otago	v	Northern Districts
432/8d (128 overs); Anaru Kitchen 207 (250); Ish Sodhi 4/130 (27 overs)		275 (89 overs); Dean Brownlie 87 (158); Nathan Smith 3/63 (18 overs)
189/8d (48 overs); Brad Wilson 62 (80); Ish Sodhi 7/59 (22 overs)		350/7 (101.1 overs); Tim Seifert 151 (225); Michael Rae 3/89 (20 overs)

Northern Districts won by 3 wickets
University Oval, Dunedin
Umpires: John Bromley and Derek Walker

- Northern Districts won the toss and elected to field.
- Josh Tasman-Jones (Otago) made his first-class debut.
