= 2015–16 Plunket Shield season =

Cricket tournament

2015–16 Plunket Shield
- Dates: 15 October 2015 – 2 April 2016
- Cricket format: First-class
- Tournament format(s): Round-robin
- Champions: Auckland (23rd title)
- Participants: 6
- Matches: 30
- Most runs: Bharat Popli (1149)
- Most wickets: Ajaz Patel (43)

The 2015–16 Plunket Shield was the 90th season of official first-class cricket in New Zealand. The competition started on 15 October 2015, and ran to 2 April 2016. Auckland won the competition following a draw in their match against Wellington in round nine of the competition.

== Teams ==
Team	Home Ground(s)
Northern Districts	Seddon Park, Cobham Oval, Harry Barker Reserve
Auckland	Eden Park No.2
Central Districts	Nelson Park, McLean Park, Saxton Oval
Wellington	Basin Reserve, Karori Park
Canterbury	Mainpower Oval, Hagley Oval
Otago	Queen's Park, University Oval

== Squads ==
Auckland	Canterbury	Central Districts	Northern Districts	Otago	Wellington
Michael Bates; Brad Cachopa; Colin de Grandhomme; Lachie Ferguson; Donovan Grobbelaar; Martin Guptill; Michael Guptill-Bunce; Shawn Hicks; Mitchell McClenaghan; Colin Munro; Tarun Nethula; Rob Nicol; Robert O'Donnell; Glenn Phillips; Matt Quinn; Brett Randell; Jeet Raval	Todd Astle; Hamish Bennett; Leo Carter; Andrew Ellis; Cam Fletcher; Peter Fulton; Matt Henry; Ronnie Hira; Kyle Jamieson; Tim Johnston; Tom Latham; Ryan McCone; Ken McClure; Cole McConchie; Henry Nicholls; Edward Nuttall; Logan van Beek	Doug Bracewell; Tom Bruce; Dane Cleaver; Greg Hay; Marty Kain; Andrew Mathieson; Adam Milne; Ajaz Patel; Seth Rance; Dean Robinson; Jesse Ryder; Bevan Small; Ben Smith; Ross Taylor; Kruger van Wyk; Ben Wheeler; George Worker; Will Young	Corey Anderson; Cody Andrews; James Baker; Bharat Popli; Jono Boult; Trent Boult; Dean Brownlie; Joe Carter; Anton Devcich; Daniel Flynn; Tony Goodin; Brett Hampton; Jono Hickey; Scott Kuggeleijn; Daryl Mitchell; Mitchell Santner; Tim Seifert; Ish Sodhi; Tim Southee; BJ Watling; Kane Williamson	Warren Barnes; Nick Beard; Samuel Blakely; Michael Bracewell; Neil Broom; Mark Craig; Derek de Boorder; Jacob Duffy; Ryan Duffy; Josh Finnie; Anaru Kitchen; Brendon McCullum; Nathan McCullum; James Neesham; Michael Rae; Hamish Rutherford; Craig Smith; Neil Wagner; Sam Wells; Brad Wilson	Brent Arnel; Brady Barnett; Tom Blundell; Alecz Day; Grant Elliott; Jamie Gibson; Dane Hutchinson; Matt McEwan; Stephen Murdoch; Ollie Newton; Michael Papps; Jeetan Patel; Michael Pollard; Luke Ronchi; Matt Taylor; Anurag Verma; Luke Woodcock

== Points table ==
Team	Pld	W	L	D	Ab	Pts
Auckland	10	6	1	3	0	132
Canterbury	10	5	3	2	0	117
Wellington	10	5	3	2	0	108
Northern Districts	10	2	4	4	0	87
Central Districts	10	2	5	3	0	85
Otago	10	1	5	4	0	61

Winner

== Fixtures ==
=== Round 1 ===
15 – 18 October
Scorecard

Canterbury	v	Auckland (H)
149 (48.1 overs); Ken McClure 38 (72); Mitchell McClenaghan 4/38 (13 overs)		316 (123.3 overs); Colin de Grandhomme 70 (112); Andrew Ellis 3/54 (25.3 overs)
321 (126.4 overs); Leo Carter 79 (229); Matt Quinn 4/81 (28 overs)		158/1 (37 overs); Martin Guptill 84* (94); Logan van Beek 1/24 (8 overs)

Auckland won by 9 wickets
Eden Park Outer Oval, Auckland
Umpires: Billy Bowden and Tony Gillies

- Auckland won the toss and elected to field.
- Ken McClure and Theo van Woerkom (Canterbury) made their first-class debuts.

15 – 18 October
Scorecard

Otago	v	Central Districts (H)
352 (109.5 overs); James Neesham 131 (152); Doug Bracewell 5/67 (26 overs)		650/8d (150 overs); Ben Smith 244 (368); Nick Beard 4/177 (32 overs)
265/3 (89 overs); Neil Broom 131* (223); Josh Clarkson 2/36 (11 overs)

Match drawn
Nelson Park, Napier
Umpires: Barry Frost and Wayne Knights

- Otago won the toss and elected to bat.
- Josh Clarkson (Central Districts) and Jack Hunter (Otago) made their first-class debuts.

15 – 18 October
Scorecard

Wellington	v	Northern Districts (H)
267 (65 overs); Luke Ronchi 115 (112); Tim Southee 5/56 (15 overs)		429 (147.2 overs); Daniel Flynn 102 (239); Dane Hutchinson 5/116 (31.2 overs)
409/9 (135 overs); Stephen Murdoch 93 (147); Trent Boult 5/97 (26 overs)

Match drawn
Seddon Park, Hamilton
Umpires: Ashley Mehrotra and Tim Parlane

- Northern Districts won the toss and elected to field.

=== Round 2 ===
23 – 26 October
Scorecard

Central Districts (H)	v	Wellington
385 (105.1 overs); George Worker 210 (270); Brent Arnel 3/67 (27.1 overs)		353/5d (110 overs); Stephen Murdoch 171 (301); Blair Tickner 4/65 (19 overs)
273/8d (100 overs); Ben Smith 117* (281); Jeetan Patel 3/74 (31 overs)		307/5 (62.3 overs); Tom Blundell 77* (88); Andrew Mathieson 1/27 (5 overs)

Wellington won by 5 wickets
Saxton Oval, Nelson
Umpires: Phil Jones and Ashley Mehrotra

- Wellington won the toss and elected to field.

23 – 26 October
Scorecard

Northern Districts (H)	v	Auckland
124 (48.1 overs); Bharat Popli 32 (81); Michael Bates 4/29 (10.1 overs)		98 (23.1 overs); Mitchell McClenaghan 20 (17); Scott Kuggeleijn 5/32 (10.1 overs)
206 (61.1 overs); Anton Devcich 54 (78); Donovan Grobbelaar 3/37 (13 overs)		233/7 (65 overs); Rob Nicol 59 (125); Scott Kuggeleijn 3/67 (20 overs)

Auckland won by 3 wickets
Bay Oval, Mount Maunganui
Umpires: Barry Frost and Tony Gillies

- Auckland won the toss and elected to field.
- Brett Hampton and Nick Kelly (Northern Districts) made their first-class debuts.

24 – 27 October
Scorecard

Canterbury (H)	v	Otago
293 (90.5 overs); Logan van Beek 111* (125); Jack Hunter 4/47 (24 overs)		91 (36.3 overs); Nick Beard 22 (51); Will Williams 3/13 (9.3 overs)
350/2d (69 overs); Peter Fulton 155* (144); Nick Beard 2/92 (19 overs)		248 (97.1 overs); Brad Wilson 100 (252); Logan van Beek 6/57 (20.1 overs)

Canterbury won by 304 runs
Hagley Oval, Christchurch
Umpires: Billy Bowden and Chris Brown

- Otago won the toss and elected to field.
- Logan van Beek (Canterbury) scored his maiden first-class century.

=== Round 3 ===
17 – 20 December
Scorecard

Northern Districts	v	Auckland (H)
381 (108.3 overs); Bharat Popli 116 (182); Lachie Ferguson 5/61 (23.3 overs)		380 (88.1 overs); Jeet Raval 89 (112); Scott Kuggeleijn 4/108 (22.1 overs)
374/7d (110 overs); Scott Kuggeleijn 104* (177); Mitchell McClenaghan 4/83 (27 overs)		253/7 (58 overs); Michael Guptill-Bunce 92 (80); Ish Sodhi 4/96 (23 overs)

Match drawn
Eden Park Outer Oval, Auckland
Umpires: Chris Brown and Barry Frost

- Auckland won the toss and elected to field.
- Mark Chapman and Shawn Hicks (Auckland) both made their first-class debuts.

17 – 20 December
Scorecard

Canterbury (H)	v	Central Districts
320 (86.3 overs); Leo Carter 101 (165); Navin Patel 3/56 (19.3 overs)		245 (69.5 overs); Will Young 63 (138); Matt Henry 3/38 (15 overs)
310 (77.4 overs); Matt Henry 75 (52); Adam Milne 4/31 (12 overs)		224 (71.3 overs); Tom Bruce 67 (122); Todd Astle 5/50 (19.3 overs)

Canterbury won by 161 runs
Mainpower Oval, Rangiora
Umpires: Tony Gillies and Derek Walker

- Central Districts won the toss and elected to field.
- Navin Patel (Central Districts) made his first-class debut.

17 – 20 December
Scorecard

Wellington (H)	v	Otago
328 (101.2 overs); Luke Ronchi 116* (131); Bradley Scott 4/74 (23 overs)		279/8d (84.5 overs); Anaru Kitchen 72 (104); Jeetan Patel 3/59 (23 overs)
305/4d (66 overs); Michael Papps 132 (181); Bradley Scott 3/47 (10 overs)		262 (72 overs); Neil Broom 85 (111); Jeetan Patel 6/77 (24 overs)

Wellington won by 92 runs
Basin Reserve, Wellington
Umpires: Ashley Mehrotra and Tim Parlane

- Otago won the toss and elected to field.

=== Round 4 ===
5 – 8 February
Scorecard

Northern Districts	v	Central Districts (H)
268 (93.4 overs); Tim Seifert 106 (190); Bevan Small 3/43 (18 overs)		256 (63.5 overs); Dane Cleaver 66* (83); Scott Kuggeleijn 4/82 (19 overs)
425/7d (98.5 overs); Bharat Popli 133 (191); Blair Tickner 3/89 (18.5 overs)		153 (55.4 overs); Dane Cleaver 40 (50); Scott Kuggeleijn 4/25 (13.4 overs)

Northern Districts won by 284 runs
McLean Park, Napier
Umpires: Barry Frost and Ashley Mehrotra

- Central Districts won the toss and elected to field.

5 – 8 February
Scorecard

Canterbury (H)	v	Auckland
294 (88.2 overs); Tim Johnston 76 (64); Colin de Grandhomme 3/38 (16 overs)		279 (87.2 overs); Michael Guptill-Bunce 93 (121); Ed Nuttall 5/72 (17 overs)
222 (74 overs); Cam Fletcher 77* (113); Michael Bates 5/48 (18 overs)		239/5 (65.2 overs); Colin de Grandhomme 106* (92); Ed Nuttall 2/24 (13 overs)

Auckland won by 5 wickets
Hagley Oval, Christchurch
Umpires: Wayne Knights and Tim Parlane

- Auckland won the toss and elected to field.
- Nathan McAndrew (Auckland) made his first-class debut.

5 – 8 February
Scorecard

Wellington	v	Otago (H)
348 (113 overs); Scott Borthwick 102 (191); Neil Wagner 5/101 (34 overs)		240 (65.4 overs); Hamish Rutherford 70 (126); Brent Arnel 5/59 (20 overs)
282/8d (94.4 overs); Fraser Colson 97 (144); Mark Craig 5/79 (35 overs)		288 (74.3 overs); James Neesham 65 (62); Matthew Bacon 3/27 (6.3 overs)

Wellington won by 102 runs
Queenstown Events Centre Queenstown
Umpires: Chris Brown and Tony Gillies

- Wellington won the toss and elected to bat.
- Matthew Bacon (Wellington) made his first-class debut.

=== Round 5 ===
13 – 16 February
Scorecard

Wellington	v	Auckland (H)
174 (71.1 overs); Luke Ronchi 50 (53); Colin de Grandhomme 4/31 (13.1 overs)		512/9d (167.5 overs); Robert O'Donnell 167 (325); Dane Hutchinson 4/89 (31.5 overs)
219 (76.2 overs); Scott Borthwick 55 (106); Tarun Nethula 4/77 (29)

Auckland won by an innings and 119 runs
Eden Park Outer Oval, Auckland
Umpires: Barry Frost and Wayne Knights

- Auckland won the toss and elected to field.

13 – 16 February
Scorecard

Otago (H)	v	Northern Districts
237 (66.1 overs); Brad Wilson 97 (175); Tony Goodin 4/50 (14.1 overs)		324 (107.5 overs); Daniel Flynn 92 (194); James Neesham 2/17 (7 overs)
287 (76.3 overs); Michael Bracewell 96 (115); Ish Sodhi 7/102 (27.3 overs)		139 (51 overs); James Baker 41* (60); Jack Hunter 3/27 (10 overs)

Otago won by 61 runs
University Oval, Dunedin
Umpires: Ashley Mehrotra and Derek Walker

- Northern Districts won the toss and elected to field.

13 – 16 February
Scorecard

Canterbury	v	Central Districts (H)
204 (66.1 overs); Peter Fulton 89 (183); Navin Patel 4/37 (18 overs)		168 (67.2 overs); Will Young 84 (141); Kyle Jamieson 5/47 (20 overs)
339 (103.5 overs); Leo Carter 82 (169); Ajaz Patel 6/152 (39.5 overs)		278/9 (101 overs); Ben Smith 78 (181); Andrew Ellis 5/52 (21 overs)

Match drawn
Nelson Park, Napier
Umpires: Tony Gillies and Geoff Joshua (Aus)

- Central Districts won the toss and elected to field.
- Michael Davidson (Canterbury) made his first-class debut.

=== Round 6 ===
20 – 23 February
Scorecard

Auckland (H)	v	Otago
277 (76.1 overs); Rob Nicol 60 (170); Sam Wells 3/59 (16 overs)		265 (79.1 overs); Anaru Kitchen 53 (70); Tarun Nethula 3/64 (21.1 overs)
431/8d (113 overs); Jeet Raval 202* (311); Anaru Kitchen 3/36 (12 overs)		338/7 (110 overs); Brad Wilson 107 (239); Lachie Ferguson 3/36 (18 overs)

Match drawn
Eden Park Outer Oval, Auckland
Umpires: Billy Bowden and R. G. Hooper

- Otago won the toss and elected to field.

20 – 23 February
Scorecard

Northern Districts (H)	v	Canterbury
257 (69 overs); Daryl Mitchell 84 (77); Todd Astle 3/89 (19.2 overs)		485 (132.1 overs); Andrew Ellis 143 (170); Ish Sodhi 5/167 (38.1 overs)
316 (99.2 overs); Bharat Popli 94 (194); Andrew Ellis 3/43 (20 overs)		90/2 (17 overs); Michael Davidson 26 (28); Tony Goodin 1/8 (4 overs)

Canterbury won by 8 wickets
Seddon Park, Hamilton
Umpires: John Bromley and Phil Jones

- Canterbury won the toss and elected to field.

20 – 23 February
Scorecard

Central Districts (H)	v	Wellington
424/6d (119.4 overs); Dane Cleaver 151* (208); Dane Hutchinson 3/121 (24.4 overs)		370/7d (100.5 overs); Tom Blundell 92 (127); Kurt Richards 3/77 (21.5 overs)
314/6d (87 overs); Greg Hay 127 (254); Jeetan Patel 3/114 (32 overs)		281 (70.1 overs); Luke Ronchi 88 (111); George Worker 4/58 (17.1 overs)

Central Districts won by 87 runs
Nelson Park, Napier
Umpires: Shaun Haig and Wayne Knights

- Wellington won the toss and elected to field.
- Mitch Renwick (Central Districts) made his first-class debut.

=== Round 7 ===
8 – 11 March
Scorecard

Northern Districts	v	Wellington (H)
438/8d (104 overs); BJ Watling 77 (155); Brent Arnel 3/114 (32 overs)		352/7d (105.2 overs); Luke Woodcock 111 (212); Joe Walker 3/80 (28 overs)
291/3d (43 overs); Daniel Flynn 110 (86); Jeetan Patel 2/97 (13 overs)		378/3 (75 overs); Scott Borthwick 94 (148); James Baker 3/84 (19 overs)

Wellington won by 3 wickets
Basin Reserve, Wellington
Umpires: Tony Gillies and Tim Parlane

- Wellington won the toss and elected to field.
- Ian McPeake (Wellington) made his first-class debut.

8 – 11 March
Scorecard

Otago (H)	v	Canterbury
351 (114.5 overs); Neil Broom 117 (241); Kyle Jamieson 3/54 (25 overs)		180 (69 overs); Michael Davidson 44 (77); Mark Craig 4/40 (23 overs)
225/3d (45 overs); Anaru Kitchen 61 (90); Andrew Ellis 1/31 (12 overs)		398/5 (106.3 overs); Ken McClure 193* (266); Mark Craig 3/152 (37 overs)

Canterbury won by 5 wickets
Queen's Park, Invercargill
Umpires: Chris Brown and Barry Frost

- Canterbury won the toss and elected to field.

8 – 11 March
Scorecard

Auckland (H)	v	Central Districts
373 (80.2 overs); Michael Guptill-Bunce 112 (103); Ajaz Patel 6/117 (30 overs)		416 (113.1 overs); Will Young 85 (143); Tarun Nethula 6/132
425/6 (88 overs); Jeet Raval 139 (185); Ajaz Patel 5/148 (36 overs)		335 (79.1 overs); Will Young 62 (119); Tarun Nethula 5/140 (28.1 overs)

Auckland won by 47 runs
Eden Park Outer Oval, Auckland
Umpires: Stephen Harris (SA) and Ashley Mehrotra

- Central Districts won the toss and elected to field.

=== Round 8 ===
15 – 18 March
Scorecard

Northern Districts (H)	v	Central Districts
458/6d (119 overs); Bharat Popli 172 (331); Liam Dudding 3/119 (30 overs)		293 (76.1 overs); Mitch Renwick 69 (116); Anton Devcich 4/43 (15.1 overs)
332/7d (60.4 overs); Daryl Mitchell 72 (49); Ajaz Patel 4/123 (23 overs)		382 (102.2 overs); Tom Bruce 166* (233); Anton Devcich 4/141 (35.2 overs)

Northern Districts won by 115 runs
Seddon Park, Hamilton
Umpires: Wayne Knights and Derek Walker

- Central Districts won the toss and elected to field.
- Liam Dudding (Central Districts) and Zak Gibson (Northern Districts) both made their first-class debuts.

15 – 18 March
Scorecard

Wellington	v	Canterbury (H)
206 (79.5 overs); Scott Borthwick 110* (257); Andrew Ellis 4/33 (22 overs)		159/2d (47.1 overs); Michael Davidson 73* (143); Anurag Verma 2/45 (13 overs)
136 (56.1 overs); Michael Papps 51 (73); Hamish Bennett 5/54 (17 overs)		129 (37 overs); Chad Bowes 34 (46); Jeetan Patel 3/20 (7 overs)

Wellington won by 54 runs
Hagley Oval, Christchurch
Umpires: Chris Brown and Stephen Harris (SA)

- Canterbury won the toss and elected to field.
- No play was possible on Day 2.

15 – 18 March
Scorecard

Otago (H)	v	Auckland
255 (60.1 overs); Robert O'Donnell 87 (126); Christi Viljoen 3/44 (13 overs)		177 (57.5 overs); Ryan Duffy 90* (163); Colin de Grandhomme 3/29 (12.5 overs)
139 (50.5 overs); Jeet Raval 47 (79); Craig Smith 4/35 (15.5 overs)		207 (49.3 overs); Derek de Boorder 81 (76); Lachie Ferguson 5/68 (14.3 overs)

Auckland won by 10 runs
University Oval, Dunedin
Umpires: Billy Bowden and Phil Jones

- Otago won the toss and elected to field.
- No play was possible on Day 1.

=== Round 9 ===
23 – 26 March
Scorecard

Auckland	v	Wellington (H)
152 (34 overs); Donovan Grobbelaar 25 (30); Brent Arnel 5/51 (14 overs)		236 (77.4 overs); Michael Pollard 68 (157); Lachie Ferguson 5/37 (17.4 overs)
598 (134.5 overs); Michael Guptill-Bunce 189 (218); Scott Borthwick 3/101 (21 overs)		308/8 (80 overs); Stephen Murdoch 78 (95); Tarun Nethula 4/121 (26.4 overs)

Match drawn
Basin Reserve, Wellington
Umpires: Chris Brown and Tim Parlane

- Wellington won the toss and elected to field.

23 – 26 March
Scorecard

Northern Districts	v	Canterbury (H)
185 (61.4 overs); Joe Walker 36* (52); Todd Astle 3/10 (5.4 overs)		258 (90.3 overs); Peter Fulton 58 (103); Zak Gibson 4/62 (21 overs)
355 (109.3 overs); Bharat Popli 92 (198); Todd Astle 4/82 (27 overs)		78/6 (49 overs); Chad Bowes 17 (19); Brett Hampton 2/20 (6 overs)

Match drawn
Hagley Oval, Christchurch
Umpires: Shaun Haig and Derek Walker

- Canterbury won the toss and elected to field.

23 – 26 March
Scorecard

Central Districts	v	Otago (H)
258 (86.3 overs); Dane Cleaver 93 (143); Jacob Duffy 5/96 (25.3 overs)		198 (48.2 overs); Josh Finnie 52 (69); Navin Patel 5/72 (17.2 overs)
282/8d (72.2 overs); Will Young 83 (143); Anaru Kitchen 2/26 (4.2 overs)		305/8 (84 overs); Ryan Duffy 104 (170); Ajaz Patel 4/80 (26)

Match drawn
University Oval, Dunedin
Umpires: Tony Gillies and Ashley Mehrotra

- Otago won the toss and elected to field.
- No play was possible on Day 2.

=== Round 10 ===
30 March – 2 April
Scorecard

Canterbury	v	Wellington (H)
430/8d (113 overs); Ken McClure 115 (160); Jeetan Patel 4/80 (29 overs)		201 (53 overs); Stephen Murdoch 105 (103); Andrew Ellis 4/32 (15 overs)
333 (95.4 overs); Tom Blundell 153 (212); Ed Nuttall 3/56 (18 overs)		108/3 (20 overs); Andrew Ellis 55* (25); Ian McPeake 3/47 (9 overs)

Canterbury won by 7 wickets
Basin Reserve, Wellington
Umpires: Phil Jones and Derek Walker

- Wellington won the toss and elected to field.
- Jamie Gibson (Wellington) made his first-class debut.

30 March – 2 April
Scorecard

Otago	v	Northern Districts (H)
298 (102 overs); Brad Wilson 126 (300); James Baker 5/63 (21 overs)		431 (144.2 overs); BJ Watling 176 (373); Nathan Smith 3/80 (27 overs)
172/3 (95 overs); Brad Wilson 62 (275); Tony Goodin 1/20 (8 overs)

Match drawn
Cobham Oval, Whangārei
Umpires: Barry Frost and Wayne Knights

- Otago won the toss and elected to bat.
- Nathan Smith (Otago) made his first-class debut.

30 March – 2 April
Scorecard

Auckland	v	Central Districts (H)
396 (98.3 overs); Jeet Raval 147 (216); Doug Bracewell 5/60 (19 overs)		464 (139.1 overs); Ben Smith 161 (344); Lachie Ferguson 3/62 (23 overs)
266 (80 overs); Donovan Grobbelaar 58 (124); Navin Patel 5/71 (27 overs)		202/6 (44.1 overs); Greg Hay 72 (109); Tarun Nethula 5/73 (16 overs)

Central Districts won by 4 wickets
Nelson Park, Napier
Umpires: Billy Bowden and John Bromley

- Auckland won the toss and elected to bat.
