= 2010–11 New Zealand one-day cricket competition season =

2010–11 New Zealand One-Day Cricket Competition
- Administrator(s): New Zealand Cricket
- Cricket format: Limited overs cricket
- Tournament format(s): Double round-robin
- Champions: Auckland Aces (9th title)
- Participants: 6
- Matches: 26

The 2010–11 New Zealand one-day competition is the 40th season of official List A domestic cricket in New Zealand. This year there is no sponsor for the one day competition. The season began on 9 January 2010 with Otago Volts playing Wellington Firebirds, Auckland Aces playing Northern Districts Knights and Central Districts Stags playing Canterbury Wizards.

== Points table ==
Pos	Team	Pld	W	L	T	NR	BP	Pts
1	Canterbury Wizards	8	5	2	0	1	3	25
2	Auckland Aces	8	5	2	0	1	1	23
3	Otago Volts	8	3	3	1	1	0	16
4	Northern Districts	8	2	3	1	2	0	14
5	Central Districts Stags	8	2	4	0	2	0	12
6	Wellington Firebirds	8	2	5	0	1	0	10

== Teams ==
Club	Home Ground	Captain
Auckland Aces	Eden Park	Gareth Hopkins
Canterbury Wizards	Mainpower Oval	Peter Fulton
Central Districts Stags	McLean Park	Jamie How
Northern Districts Knights	Seddon Park	James Marshall
Otago Volts	University Oval	Craig Cumming
Wellington Firebirds	Basin Reserve	Grant Elliott

== Playoffs ==
New Zealand Cricket uses the Page playoff system for its one-day competition.

=== Round One ===
==== Major Semi Final ====
Auckland were in cruise control needing 269 to win after being 119/1 in the 17th over. However, after both Lou Vincent and Jeet Raval fell, good bowling by Canterbury and a batting collapse by Auckland propelled Canterbury directly into the final.

6 February 2011
(scorecard)

Canterbury Wizards; 268/8 (50 Overs)	v	Auckland Aces; 227/10 (43.1 Overs)
Rob Nicol 89 (110); Chris Martin 3-48 (10 overs)		Lou Vincent 62 (55); Mitchell Claydon 4-44 (9 overs)

Canterbury Wizards won by 41 runs
Queen Elizabeth II Park, Christchurch
Umpires: DJ Walker & EA Watkin

==== Minor Semi Final ====
Through several handy innings Northern Districts posted a good 271/8. Otago started their chase poorly falling to 80/5 in the 19th over. However, Darren Broom and Derek de Boorder put on 165 runs for the 6th wicket a partnership record for Otago . This partnership meant that when the game was finally called off for rain after 46 overs, Otago was ahead of their target by nine runs. Northern were eliminated and Otago went into the elimination semi final.

6 February 2011
(scorecard)

Northern Districts; 271/8 (50 overs)	v	Otago Volts; 245/5 (46 Overs)
BJ Watling 55 (88); Craig Cumming 2-28 (8)		Darren Broom 83* (81); Graeme Aldridge 2-46 (9)

Otago Volts win by 9 runs (D/L Method)
Queenstown Events Centre, Queenstown
Umpires: MF Jones & D Cummings

- Rain stopped played continually throughout the game which was called off 46 overs into the Otago innings.

== Statistics ==
=== Most Runs ===
Player	Team	Innings	Runs	Average	Strike rate
Rob Nicol	Canterbury	4	265	66.25	70.47
George Worker	Central Districts	4	253	63.25	76.66
Gareth Hopkins	Auckland	5	230	46.00	103.13
Lou Vincent	Auckland	5	212	53.00	89.07
Peter Fulton	Canterbury	4	208	52.00	96.74
Grant Elliott	Wellington	4	187	46.75	80.60
Scott Styris	Northern Districts	4	181	60.33	90.04
Daniel Flynn	Northern Districts	4	174	43.50	94.05
Mathew Sinclair	Central Districts	4	173	57.66	85.22
Michael Papps	Canterbury	4	163	40.75	69.06

=== Most Wickets ===
Player	Team	Matches	Overs	Wickets	Average	Economy rate
Mark Gillespie	Wellington	4	38.4	11	17.63	5.01
Luke Woodcock	Wellington	4	38	10	16.00	4.21
Tarun Nethula	Central Districts	4	40	10	19.10	4.77
Nathan McCullum	Otago	4	39	9	17.33	4.00
Michael Bates	Auckland	5	46	9	27.77	5.43
Doug Bracewell	Central Districts	3	27.50	8	17.62	5.06
Hamish Bennett	Canterbury	4	36.4	7	24.28	4.63
Daryl Tuffey	Auckland	4	37.4	7	26.71	4.96
Jacob Oram	Central Districts	4	40.0	7	30.71	5.37
Andre Adams	Auckland	5	50.0	7	31.57	4.42

Last Updated 24 January 2011

== Team of the Season ==
Player
Rob Nicol
Lou Vincent
BJ Watling
Peter Fulton
Gareth Hopkins
Andy Ellis
Derek de Boorder
Tarun Nethula
Mark Gillespie
Andre Adams
Mitchell Claydon

== See also ==
- Plunket Shield
- New Zealand limited-overs cricket trophy
- State Twenty20
