= 2013–14 Ford Trophy =

- Dates: 2 March 2014 – 5 April 2014
- Administrator(s): New Zealand Cricket
- Cricket format: List A cricket
- Tournament format(s): Round-robin and knockout
- Champions: Wellington (7th title)
- Participants: 6
- Matches: 28
- Most runs: Jesse Ryder (436)
- Most wickets: Scott Kuggeleijn (22)

The 2013–14 Ford Trophy was the 43rd season of the official List A cricket tournament in New Zealand, and the third in a sponsorship deal between New Zealand Cricket and Ford Motor Company. The competition ran from 2 March 2014 to 5 April 2014. The tournament was won by the Wellington for the seventh time, after defeating Northern Districts in the final by four wickets.

== Points table ==
Pos	Team	Pld	W	L	T	NR	BP	Pts	NRR
1	Canterbury	8	4	2	0	2	3	23	1.380
2	Northern Districts	8	5	3	0	0	2	22	0.387
3	Auckland	8	4	3	0	1	3	21	−0.113
4	Wellington	8	3	3	0	2	1	17	−0.359
5	Otago	8	3	4	0	1	1	15	0.237
6	Central Districts	8	2	6	0	0	2	10	−1.177

Teams qualified for the finals

== Finals ==
=== 1st Preliminary Final ===
30 March 2014
Scorecard

Canterbury; 224/9 (50 overs)	v	Northern Districts; 225/6 (49 overs)
Peter Fulton 82* (112); Scott Kuggeleijn 3/50 (10 overs)		Daniel Flynn 73 (100); Andrew Ellis 2/44 (9 overs)

Northern Districts won by 4 wickets
Hagley Oval, Christchurch
Umpires: Gary Baxter and Chris Gaffaney

- Canterbury won the toss and elected to bat.

=== 2nd Preliminary Final ===
30 March 2014
Scorecard

Auckland; 220 (48.3 overs)	v	Wellington; 224/6 (44.3 overs)
Tim McIntosh 54 (88); Luke Woodcock 2/30 (10 overs)		Michael Pollard 85 (79); Bhupinder Singh 3/35 (10 overs)

Wellington won by 4 wickets
Eden Park, Auckland
Umpires: Derek Walker and Tim Parlane

- Auckland won the toss and elected to bat.

=== 3rd Preliminary Final ===
2 April 2014
Scorecard

Canterbury; 239/8 (50 overs)	v	Wellington; 240/2 (46 overs)
Andrew Ellis 81 (76); Luke Woodcock 3/26 (10 overs)		Stephen Murdoch 80* (105); Rob Nicol 1/43 (10 overs)

Wellington won by 8 wickets
Hagley Oval, Christchurch
Umpires: Phil Jones and Wayne Knights

- Wellington won the toss and elected to field.
- Kyle Jamieson (Canterbury) made his List A debut

=== Final ===
5 April 2014
Scorecard

Northern Districts; 232/9 (50 overs)	v	Wellington; 233/6 (49.2 overs)
Brad Wilson 68 (95); Brent Arnel 3/30 (9 overs)		James Franklin 75 (87); Mitchell Santner 2/35 (10 overs)

Wellington won by 4 wickets
Bay Oval, Mount Maunganui
Umpires: Phil Jones and Derek Walker

- Northern Districts won the toss and elected to bat.
