= 2013–14 Plunket Shield season =

Cricket tournament in New Zealand

2013–14 Plunket Shield
- Dates: 27 October 2013 – 26 February 2014
- Cricket format: First-class
- Tournament format: Round-robin
- Champions: Canterbury (17th title)
- Participants: 6
- Matches: 30
- Most runs: Tom Latham - 948
- Most wickets: Mark Gillespie - 42

The 2013–14 Plunket Shield was the 88th season of official First-class cricket in New Zealand. The competition started on 27 October 2013, and finished on 26 February 2014. Canterbury won the tournament for the seventeenth time after a victory against Central Districts in the final round of matches.

== Teams ==
Team	Home Ground(s)
Northern Districts	Seddon Park, Cobham Oval, Harry Barker Reserve
Auckland	Eden Park No.2
Central Districts	Nelson Park, McLean Park, Saxton Oval
Wellington	Basin Reserve, Karori Park
Canterbury	Rangiora Recreation Ground, Hagley Oval
Otago	Queens Park, University of Otago Oval

== Points distribution ==
Result	Points
Won	12
Lost	0
Drawn	0
Tied	6
Abandoned	2

Batting Bonus Points are awarded in relation to the number of runs scored after 110 overs are bowled in the first innings.

Runs Scored	Points Awarded
250-299	1
300-349	2
350-399	3
400+	4

Bowling Bonus Points are awarded in relation to the number of wickets taken after 110 overs are bowled in the first innings.

Wickets Taken	Points Awarded
3-4	1
5-6	2
7-8	3
9-10	4

== Points table ==
Team	Played	Won	Lost	Tied	Drawn	Bat.	Bowl.	Total points	NR/W
Canterbury	10	5	3	0	2	13	33	106	+1.010
Otago	10	3	2	0	5	19	31	86	+0.990
Auckland	10	2	2	0	6	22	33	79	+3.235
Wellington	10	2	2	0	6	18	30	72	+1.429
Central Districts	10	2	3	0	5	16	30	70	-3.004
Northern Districts	10	2	4	0	4	10	24	58	-1.490

== Fixtures and results ==
27–30 October 2013
Scorecard

Otago	v	Wellington (H)
534/9d Aaron Redmond 154 (275); Jeetan Patel 4/124 (40 overs)		403/5d Michael Pollard 124* (248); Blair Soper 2/98 (24 overs)
369/8d Derek de Boorder 95 (144); Mark Gillespie 2/50 (18 overs)		125/3; Michael Papps 62* (102); Mark Craig 2/54 (14 overs)

Match Drawn
Basin Reserve, Wellington
Umpires: Wayne Knights and Tim Parlane

- Wellington won the toss and chose to field
- Points: Otago 6, Wellington 5

31 October - 3 November 2013
Scorecard

Northern Districts (H)	v	Auckland
315; 90 BJ Watling; 4/66 Matt Quinn		302; 69 Craig Cachopa; 5/52 Daniel Vettori
384/9 dec. 114 BJ Watling; 3/100 Bruce Martin		189/1; 105* Jeet Raval; 1/43 Daniel Vettori

Match Drawn
Seddon Park, Hamilton
Umpires: Billy Bowden and Tony Gillies

- Northern Districts won the toss and chose to bat

7–10 November 2013
Scorecard

Central Districts	v	Wellington (H)
289; 78 Will Young; 6/77 Mark Gillespie		293; 62 Michael Papps; 4/60 Doug Bracewell
313/5 dec. 133* Ben Smith; 4/89 Brent Arnel		310/5; 65 Michael Pollard; 2/61 Andrew Mathieson

Wellington won by 5 wickets
Basin Reserve, Wellington
Umpires: Gary Baxter and Phil Jones

- Wellington won the toss and chose to field
- Fraser Colson made his first-class debut for Wellington
