= 2014–15 Super Smash =

2014 cricket tournament in New Zealand

- Dates: 1 November 2014 – 7 December 2014
- Administrator(s): New Zealand Cricket
- Cricket format: Twenty20
- Tournament format(s): Round-robin and knockout
- Champions: Wellington Firebirds (1st title)
- Participants: 6
- Matches: 33
- Most runs: Daniel Flynn (366)
- Most wickets: Andrew Ellis (18)

The 2014–15 Georgie Pie Super Smash (named after the competition's sponsor McDonald's iconic New Zealand brand Georgie Pie) was the tenth season of the Men's Super Smash Twenty20 cricket tournament in New Zealand. The competition ran from 1 November 2014 to 7 December 2014. The tournament was won by the Wellington Firebirds for the first time, after they defeated Auckland Aces in the final by six runs.

== Points table ==
Pos	Team	Pld	W	L	T	NR	Pts	NRR
1	Northern Knights	10	7	2	0	1	30	0.431
2	Wellington Firebirds	10	5	3	0	2	24	0.233
3	Auckland Aces	10	5	4	0	1	22	0.433
4	Canterbury Kings	10	5	5	0	0	20	0.538
5	Central Stags	10	3	6	0	1	14	−0.511
6	Otago Volts	10	2	7	0	1	10	−1.127

Teams qualified for the finals

== Finals ==
=== 1st Preliminary Final ===
5 December 2014
Scorecard

Northern Knights; 124/5 (20 overs)	v	Wellington Firebirds; 125/2 (16.1 overs)
Daryl Mitchell 36* (31); Grant Elliott 2/20 (4 overs)		Michael Papps 65 (46); Scott Kuggeleijn 1/50 (3.1 overs)

Wellington Firebirds won by 8 wickets
Seddon Park, Hamilton
Umpires: Phil Jones and Tim Parlane

- Wellington Firebirds won the toss and elected to field.

=== 2nd Preliminary Final ===
6 December 2014
Scorecard

Northern Knights; 140 (19.3 overs)	v	Auckland Aces; 146/4 (17.3 overs)
Kevin O'Brien (cricketer) 52 (25); Michael Bates 4/10 (2.3 overs)		Craig Cachopa 79* (47); Ish Sodhi 1/27 (4 overs)

Auckland Aces won by 6 wickets
Seddon Park, Hamilton
Umpires: Derek Walker and Tim Parlane

- Northern Knights won the toss and elected to bat.

=== Final ===
7 December 2014
Scorecard

Wellington Firebirds; 186/6 (20 overs)	v	Auckland Aces; 180/9 (20 overs)
Michael Pollard 76 (56); Tarun Nethula 2/30 (4 overs)		Craig Cachopa 37 (25); Grant Elliott 2/32 (4 overs)

Wellington Firebirds won by 6 runs
Seddon Park, Hamilton
Umpires: Phil Jones and Derek Walker

- Auckland Aces won the toss and elected to field.
