= New Zealand cricket team in the West Indies in 2012 =

	New Zealand	West Indies
- Dates: 30 June 2012 – 6 August 2012
Captains	Ross Taylor	Darren Sammy

Test series
- Result: West Indies won the 2-match series 2–0
Most runs	Martin Guptill (277)	Chris Gayle (230)
Most wickets	Doug Bracewell (7)	Sunil Narine (12); Kemar Roach (12)
- Player of the series: Kemar Roach (WI)

One Day International series
- Results: West Indies won the 5-match series 4–1
Most runs	BJ Watling (172)	Chris Gayle (220)
Most wickets	Tim Southee (10)	Sunil Narine (13)
- Player of the series: Sunil Narine (WI)

Twenty20 International series
- Results: West Indies won the 2-match series 2–0
Most runs	Rob Nicol (39)	Chris Gayle (138)
Most wickets	Nathan McCullum (2); Doug Bracewell (2)	Sunil Narine (7)
- Player of the series: Chris Gayle (WI)

The New Zealand national cricket team toured the West Indies from 30 June to 6 August. The tour consisted of five One Day International matches and two Test matches. It also featured two Twenty20 International matches that were hosted in Lauderhill, Florida in the United States.

== Squads ==
Tests		ODIs		T20Is	
New Zealand	West Indies	New Zealand	West Indies	New Zealand	West Indies
Ross Taylor (c); Doug Bracewell; Dean Brownlie; Trent Boult; Daniel Flynn; Mark Gillespie; Martin Guptill; Chris Martin; Brendon McCullum; Tarun Nethula; Kruger van Wyk; Daniel Vettori; Neil Wagner; BJ Watling (wk); Kane Williamson		Ross Taylor (c); Trent Boult; Doug Bracewell; Dean Brownlie; Andrew Ellis; Daniel Flynn; Martin Guptill; Tom Latham; Nathan McCullum; Kyle Mills; Tarun Nethula; Rob Nicol; Jacob Oram; Tim Southee; BJ Watling (wk); Kane Williamson	Darren Sammy; Samuel Badree; Dwayne Bravo; Johnson Charles; Chris Gayle; Sunil Narine; Kieron Pollard; Denesh Ramdin (wk); Ravi Rampaul; Andre Russell; Marlon Samuels; Lendl Simmons; Dwayne Smith	Ross Taylor (c); Doug Bracewell; Dean Brownlie; Andrew Ellis; Daniel Flynn; Martin Guptill; Ronnie Hira^{†}; Tom Latham; Nathan McCullum; Kyle Mills; Rob Nicol; Jacob Oram; Tim Southee; BJ Watling (wk); Kane Williamson	Darren Sammy; Samuel Badree; Dwayne Bravo; Johnson Charles; Fidel Edwards; Chris Gayle; Sunil Narine; Kieron Pollard; Denesh Ramdin (wk); Ravi Rampaul; Marlon Samuels; Lendl Simmons; Dwayne Smith

^{†}withdrawn

== T20I series ==
=== 1st T20I ===
30 June 2012
15:00
Scorecard

West Indies; 209/2 (20 overs)	v	New Zealand; 153 (18.3 overs)
Chris Gayle 85 (52); Kane Williamson 1/21 (1.4 overs)		Rob Nicol 32 (31); Sunil Narine 3/34 (4 overs)

West Indies won by 56 runs
Central Broward Regional Park, Lauderhill, Florida
Umpires: Peter Nero (WI) and Joel Wilson (WI)
Player of the match: Chris Gayle (WI)

- New Zealand won the toss and elected to field.
- Tom Latham (NZ) and Samuel Badree (WI) made their T20I debuts.

=== 2nd T20I ===
1 July 2012
14:00
Scorecard

West Indies; 177/5 (20 overs)	v	New Zealand; 116 (18.4 overs)
Chris Gayle 53 (39); Nathan McCullum 2/19 (3 overs)		Daniel Flynn 22 (19); Sunil Narine 4/12 (4 overs)

West Indies won by 61 runs
Central Broward Regional Park, Lauderhill, Florida
Umpires: Peter Nero (WI) and Joel Wilson (WI)
Player of the match: Sunil Narine (WI)

- West Indies won the toss and elected to bat.

== ODI series ==
All times local (UTC-5 in Jamaica, UTC-4 in all other locations)

=== 1st ODI ===
5 July 2012
09:30
Scorecard

New Zealand; 190/9 (50 overs)	v	West Indies; 136/1 (24.2 overs)
BJ Watling 60 (98); Andre Russell 4/45 (10 overs)		Dwayne Smith 65 (77); Kyle Mills 1/7 (5 overs)

West Indies won by 9 wickets (D/L)
Sabina Park, Kingston, Jamaica
Umpires: Richard Kettleborough (Eng) and Peter Nero (WI)
Player of the match: Andre Russell (WI)

- West Indies won the toss and elected to field.
- Rain reduced West Indies' innings to 33 overs maximum, target revised to 136 by Duckworth-Lewis method.

=== 2nd ODI ===
7 July 2012
09:30
Scorecard

West Indies; 315/5 (50 overs)	v	New Zealand; 260 (47 overs)
Chris Gayle 125 (107); Tim Southee 3/55 (10 overs)		BJ Watling 72 (87); Ravi Rampaul 3/50 (9 overs)

West Indies won by 55 runs
Sabina Park, Kingston, Jamaica
Umpires: Gregory Brathwaite (WI) and Richard Illingworth (Eng)
Player of the match: Marlon Samuels (WI)

- New Zealand won the toss and elected to field.

=== 3rd ODI ===
11 July 2012
09:30
Scorecard

New Zealand; 249/9 (50 overs)	v	West Indies; 161 (34.3 overs)
Rob Nicol 59 (69); Andre Russell 4/57 (9 overs)		Andre Russell 42 (40); Jacob Oram 2/22 (7 overs)

New Zealand won by 88 runs
Warner Park, Basseterre, St. Kitts
Umpires: Richard Kettleborough (Eng) and Joel Wilson (WI)
Player of the match: Rob Nicol (NZ)

- West Indies won the toss and elected to field.
- Trent Boult (NZ) made his ODI debut.

=== 4th ODI ===
14 July 2012
09:30
Scorecard

West Indies; 264 (49.5 overs)	v	New Zealand; 240 (49.3 overs)
Kieron Pollard 56 (70); Jacob Oram 3/42 (10 overs)		Ross Taylor 110 (115); Tino Best 4/46 (10 overs)

West Indies won by 24 runs
Warner Park, Basseterre, St. Kitts
Umpires: Richard Illingworth (Eng) and Peter Nero (WI)
Player of the match: Sunil Narine (WI)

- West Indies won the toss and elected to bat.

=== 5th ODI ===
16 July 2012
09:30
Scorecard

West Indies; 241/9 (50 overs)	v	New Zealand; 221 (50 overs)
Darren Sammy 59 (57); Kyle Mills 3/40 (10 overs)		Kane Williamson 69 (84); Sunil Narine 5/27 (10 overs)

West Indies won by 20 runs
Warner Park, Basseterre, St. Kitts
Umpires: Richard Kettleborough (Eng) and Joel Wilson (WI)
Player of the match: Sunil Narine (WI)

- West Indies won the toss and elected to bat

== Tour match ==
=== Three-day: West Indies Board President's XI vs New Zealanders ===
20–22 July 2012
Scorecard

New Zealanders	v	West Indies Board President's XI
149 (77.4 overs); Kane Williamson 55 (177); Kemar Roach 4/34 (17 overs)		326 (96.2 overs); Narsingh Deonarine 106 (124); Neil Wagner 3/65 (26 overs)
181/8 (81 overs); Brendon McCullum 51 (92); Shane Shillingford 5/77 (36 overs)

Match drawn
Sir Vivian Richards Stadium, North Sound, Antigua
Umpires: Nigel Duguid (WI) and Joel Wilson (WI)

- West Indies Cricket Board President's XI won the toss and elected to field.

== Test series ==
=== 1st Test ===
25–29 July 2012
Scorecard

New Zealand	v	West Indies
351 (129.1 overs); Martin Guptill 97 (249); Sunil Narine 5/132 (43 overs)		522 (163.3 overs); Chris Gayle 150 (206); Chris Martin 3/134 (30overs)
272 (105.2 overs); Brendon McCullum 84 (139); Kemar Roach 5/60 (23.2 overs)		102/1 (19.3 overs); Chris Gayle 64 (49); Doug Bracewell 1/25 (6 overs)

West Indies won by 9 wickets
Sir Vivian Richards Stadium, North Sound, Antigua
Umpires: Richard Kettleborough (Eng) and Paul Reiffel (Aus)
Player of the match: Sunil Narine (WI)

- New Zealand won the toss and elected to bat.
- Neil Wagner (NZ) made his Test debut.

=== 2nd Test ===
2–6 August 2012
Scorecard

New Zealand	v	West Indies
260 (82.5 overs); Martin Guptill 71 (174); Kemar Roach 4/70 (17.5 overs)		209 (64.3 overs); Marlon Samuels 123 (169); Doug Bracewell 3/46 (15.3 overs)
154 (65.2 overs); Martin Guptill 42 (58); Narsingh Deonarine 4/37 (22 overs)		206/5 (63.2 overs); Marlon Samuels 52 (103); Tim Southee 1/30 (14 overs)

West Indies won by 5 wickets
Sabina Park, Kingston, Jamaica
Umpires: Marais Erasmus (SA) and Paul Reiffel (Aus)
Player of the match: Marlon Samuels (WI)

- West Indies won the toss and elected to field.
- Last Test for New Zealand coach John Wright.
