= 2014–15 Ford Trophy =

- Dates: 27 December 2014 – 1 February 2015
- Administrator(s): New Zealand Cricket
- Cricket format: List A cricket
- Tournament format(s): Round-robin and knockout
- Champions: Central Districts (5th title)
- Participants: 6
- Matches: 28
- Most runs: George Worker (538)
- Most wickets: Andrew Mathieson (31)

The 2014–15 Ford Trophy was the 44th season of the official List A cricket tournament in New Zealand, and the fourth in a sponsorship deal between New Zealand Cricket and Ford Motor Company. The competition ran from 27 December 2014 to 1 February 2015. The tournament was won by Central Districts for the fifth time, after defeating Auckland in the final by 73 runs.

== Points table ==
Pos	Team	Pld	W	L	NR	BP	Pts	NRR
1	Central Districts	8	6	2	0	2	26	1.169
2	Auckland	8	5	3	0	4	24	0.847
3	Otago	8	3	3	2	1	17	0.258
4	Northern Districts	8	4	4	0	0	16	−0.754
5	Canterbury	8	2	4	2	1	13	−0.865
6	Wellington	8	2	6	0	1	9	−0.835

Teams qualified for the finals

== Finals ==
=== 1st Preliminary Final ===
24 January 2015
Scorecard

Auckland; 260 (49.3 overs)	v	Central Districts; 215 (43.3 overs)
Colin de Grandhomme 63 (64); Doug Bracewell 4/44 (10 overs)		Dane Cleaver 66 (40); Tarun Nethula 4/51 (9 overs)

Auckland won by 45 runs
Pukekura Park, New Plymouth
Umpires: Phil Jones and Tim Parlane

- Auckland won the toss and elected to bat.
- Glenn Phillips (Auckland) made his List A debut

=== 2nd Preliminary Final ===
24 January 2015
Scorecard

Northern Districts; 245/8 (50 overs)	v	Otago; 246/7 (49.2 overs)
Daryl Mitchell 72 (94); Neil Wagner 4/60 (10 overs)		Jesse Ryder 52 (54); Graeme Aldridge 2/41 (10 overs)

Otago won by 3 wickets
Queenstown Events Centre, Queenstown
Umpires: Barry Frost and Wayne Knights

- Northern Districts won the toss and elected to bat.

=== 3rd Preliminary Final ===
28 January 2015
Scorecard

Central Districts; 252 (48.1 overs)	v	Otago; 203 (41.5 overs)
Tom Bruce 88 (65); Jacob Duffy 3/44 (10 overs)		Jesse Ryder 47 (37 overs); George Worker 3/25 (6.5 overs)

Central Districts won by 49 runs
Hagley Oval, Christchurch
Umpires: Barry Frost and Wayne Knights

- Central Districts won the toss and elected to bat.
- Tom Bruce and Mattie Thomas (Central Districts) made their List A debuts

=== Final ===
1 February 2015
Scorecard

Central Districts; 271/7 (50 overs)	v	Auckland; 193 (38.2 overs)
Kruger van Wyk 53 (88); Donovan Grobbelaar 2/38 (10 overs)		Donovan Grobbelaar 45 (54); Andrew Mathieson 4/22 (8 overs)

Central Districts won by 73 runs
Colin Maiden Park, Auckland
Umpires: Phil Jones and Tim Parlane

- Central Districts won the toss and elected to bat.
