= England A Team Triangular Series in 2014 =

- Date: 5 August 2014 – 12 August 2014
- Location: England
- Result: Winner – New Zealand A
Teams
England Lions	New Zealand A	Sri Lanka A
Captains
James Taylor	BJ Watling	Ashan Priyanjan
Most runs
Jonny Bairstow (250)	Dinesh Chandimal (207)	Dean Brownlie (136)
Most wickets
Steven Finn (5)	Seekkuge Prasanna (3)	Doug Bracewell (7)

The England A Team Triangular Series in 2014 was a List A cricket tournament that was held in England in August 2014 between the teams England Lions, New Zealand A and Sri Lanka A. New Zealand A emerged victorious of the tournament.

== Squads ==
England Lions	New Zealand A	Sri Lanka A
James Taylor (c); Jonny Bairstow (wk); Ravi Bopara; Steven Finn; Harry Gurney; Alex Hales; Craig Overton; Stephen Parry; Ravi Patel; Boyd Rankin; Jason Roy; Tom Smith; James Vince; David Willey	BJ Watling (c & wk); Todd Astle; Hamish Bennett; Doug Bracewell; Michael Bracewell; Dean Brownlie; Mark Craig; Colin de Grandhomme; Anton Devcich; Grant Elliott; Matt Henry; Scott Kuggeleijn; Tom Latham (wk); Daryl Mitchell; Colin Munro; Hamish Rutherford; Ish Sodhi	Ashan Priyanjan (c); Dushmantha Chameera; Dinesh Chandimal (wk); Chathuranga de Silva; Vishwa Fernando; Lahiru Gamage; Asela Gunaratne; Dhanushka Gunathilleke; Ishan Jayaratne; Lahiru Jayaratne; Sachith Pathirana; Priyamal Perera; Seekkuge Prasanna; Bhanuka Rajapaksa; Ramith Rambukwella; Mahela Udawatte

== Points table ==
Pos	Team	Pld	W	L	T	NR	Pts	NRR
1	New Zealand A	4	3	0	0	1	7	+1.906
2	England Lions	4	2	2	0	0	4	+0.137
3	Sri Lanka A	4	0	3	0	1	1	−1.950

== Fixtures ==
=== Group stage ===
==== Round 1 ====
5 August
Scorecard

Sri Lanka A 31/1 (5.3 overs)	v	New Zealand A
Dhanushka Gunathilleke 17* (22); Scott Kuggeleijn 1/9 (2.3 overs)

No result
County Ground, Taunton
Umpires: Nick Cook (Eng) and Stephen Gale (Eng)

- New Zealand A won the toss and elected to field.

6 August
Scorecard

England Lions; 339/5 (50 overs)	v	Sri Lanka A 288 (49 overs)
Alex Hales 101 (105); Lahiru Gamage 3/59 (10 overs)		Dinesh Chandimal 73 (82); Ravi Patel 3/71 (10 overs)

England Lions won by 51 runs
County Ground, Taunton
Umpires: Neil Bainton (Eng) and Nick Cook (Eng)

- England Lions won the toss and elected to bat.

8 August
Scorecard

New Zealand A 282 (50 overs)	v	England Lions; 260 (47.4 overs)
Dean Brownlie 115 (107); David Willey 5/62 (10 overs)		Jonny Bairstow 123 (116); Doug Bracewell 3/43 (9 overs)

New Zealand A won by 22 runs
County Ground, Bristol
Umpires: Neil Bainton (Eng) and Tim Robinson (Eng)

- New Zealand A won the toss and elected to bat.

==== Round 2 ====
9 August
Scorecard

Sri Lanka A 140 (35 overs)	v	New Zealand A 142/3 (18 overs)
Seekkuge Prasanna 24 (35); Ish Sodhi 4/10 (6 overs)		Tom Latham 64 (56); Dushmantha Chameera 2/14 (2 overs)

New Zealand A won by 7 wickets
County Ground, Bristol
Umpires: Mike Burns (Eng) and Nigel Cowley (Eng)

- New Zealand A won the toss and elected to field.

11 August
Scorecard

Sri Lanka A 283/6 (50 overs)	v	England Lions; 285/3 (46.3 overs)
Dinesh Chandimal 119* (127); Steven Finn 4/67 (10 overs)		Ravi Bopara 106 (101); Seekkuge Prasanna 3/42 (10 overs)

England Lions won by 7 wickets
County Ground, Worcester
Umpires: Tim Robinson (Eng) and Alex Wharf (Eng)

- England Lions won the toss and elected to field.

12 August
Scorecard

England Lions; 255/8 (50 overs)	v	New Zealand A 225/3 (32.3 overs)
Jonny Bairstow 77 (84); Matt Henry 3/56 (10 overs)		Hamish Rutherford 95 (84); Stephen Parry 2/43 (8 overs)

New Zealand A won by 7 wickets (D/L method)
County Ground, Worcester
Umpires: Graham Lloyd (Eng) and Tim Robinson (Eng)

- New Zealand A won the toss and elected to field.

== See also ==
- Australia A Team Quadrangular Series in 2014
