= Ryan Duffy =

Ryan Duffy may refer to:

- Ryan Duffy (cricketer) (born 1991), New Zealand cricketer
- Ryan Duffy (journalist), American journalist with Vice Media
- F. Ryan Duffy (1888–1979), Wisconsin jurist and politician
