= Rajvinder Sandhu =

New Zealand cricketer (born 1991)

Personal information
- Full name: Rajvinder Singh Sandhu
- Born: 10 July 1991 (age 35); Auckland, New Zealand
- Source: ESPNcricinfo, 1 February 2017

Rajvinder Sandhu (born 10 July 1991) is a New Zealand cricketer. He made his List A debut for Auckland on 15 January 2017 in the 2016–17 Ford Trophy. He made his first-class debut for Auckland on 25 February 2017 in the 2016–17 Plunket Shield season.
