= Jamie Gibson (cricketer) =

New Zealand cricketer (born 1993)

Personal information
- Born: 29 April 1993 (age 33); Greytown, New Zealand
- Source: Cricinfo, 1 April 2016

Jamie Gibson (born 29 April 1993) is a New Zealand cricketer. He made his first-class debut for Wellington on 30 March 2016 in the 2015–16 Plunket Shield. He made his Twenty20 debut on 15 December 2019, for Wellington in the 2019–20 Super Smash.

In June 2020, he was offered a contract by Wellington ahead of the 2020–21 domestic cricket season. In October 2020, in the second round of the 2020–21 Plunket Shield season, Gibson scored his maiden century in first-class cricket.
