= Dean Robinson (cricketer) =

New Zealander cricketer (born 1989)

Personal information
- Full name: Dean Steven Robinson
- Born: 12 November 1989 (age 37); Stratford, New Zealand
- Batting: Right-handed
- Role: Batsman

Domestic team information
- Years: Team
- 2011/12–2015/16: Central Districts

Career statistics
Competition	FC	LA	T20
Matches	15	9	1
Runs scored	435	290	3
Batting average	19.77	41.42	3.00
100s/50s	0/3	1/1	0/0
Top score	62	130*	3
Catches/stumpings	9/–	4/–	0/–
- Source: Cricinfo, 27 March 2025

Dean Steven Robinson (born 12 November 1989) is a New Zealand cricketer who played first-class and List A cricket for Central Districts from 2011–12 to 2015–16.

Robinson was born in Stratford, Taranaki, and besides playing cricket is a schoolteacher. He started playing cricket for Taranaki in 2007. An opening or number three batsman, he holds the record for the highest score for Taranaki, which is 202. In 2022, while playing in the Chapple Cup, he reached his 100th game, only the fifth Taranaki player to do so. He announced his retirement from representative cricket in March 2025 after Taranaki's successful defence of the Hawke Cup, having become Taranaki's leading run-scorer, with 5,439, and leading century-scorer, with 16.

Robinson's highest score for Central Districts was 130 not out, when Central Districts defeated Canterbury in the 2011–12 Ford Trophy. His highest first-class score was 62, also against Canterbury, in the 2013–14 Plunket Shield season.
