= 2011–12 Plunket Shield season =

Cricket tournament in New Zealand

2011–12 Plunket Shield
- Administrator(s): New Zealand Cricket
- Cricket format: First-class
- Tournament format(s): Double round-robin
- Champions: Northern Districts (8th title)
- Participants: 6
- Matches: 30
- Most runs: Mathew Sinclair – 809
- Most wickets: Neil Wagner – 46

The 2011–12 Plunket Shield season was the 86th season of official first class domestic cricket in New Zealand. The season started on 7 November 2011.

The Plunket Shield and other domestic cricket in New Zealand has traditionally been broadcast ball-by-ball by Radio New Zealand (RNZ) and more recently by Radio Sport after parts of RNZ were privatised in the 1990s. This season marked a historic milestone when Radio Sport decided to not provide any live commentary of the Plunket Shield, . This was unexpected by both listeners and the administrators of six major associations.

The competition was won by Northern Districts, who claimed the title for the eighth time after securing enough bonus points in their final match despite losing heavily to Central Districts by 252 runs.

== Table ==
The winner will be decided on points at the end of the 10 rounds.

Team	Pts	Pld	W	D	L
Northern Districts	96	10	4	4	2
Central Districts	86	10	4	4	2
Auckland	82	10	3	5	2
Wellington	77	10	3	5	2
Otago	61	10	2	3	5
Canterbury	57	10	1	5	4

== Teams ==
Team	Home ground †	Captain
Auckland	Colin Maiden Park, Auckland	Gareth Hopkins
Canterbury	Mainpower Oval, Rangiora	Peter Fulton
Central Districts	McLean Park, Napier	Jamie How
Northern Districts	Seddon Park, Hamilton	Brad Wilson
Otago	University Oval, Dunedin	Aaron Redmond
Wellington	Basin Reserve, Wellington	Grant Elliott

† Most teams play matches at other venues throughout the season.

== See also ==
- Plunket Shield
- New Zealand limited-overs cricket trophy
- HRV Twenty20 Cup
- 2011–12 Ford Trophy
- 2011–12 HRV Cup
