= Michael Davidson (cricketer, born 1992) =

New Zealand cricketer

Personal information
- Born: 3 September 1992 (age 34); Christchurch, New Zealand
- Source: Cricinfo, 16 February 2016

Michael Davidson (born 3 September 1992) is a New Zealand cricketer who plays for Canterbury. He made his first-class debut on 13 February 2016 in the 2015–16 Plunket Shield. He made his List A debut on 27 December 2015 in the 2015–16 Ford Trophy.
