= Mitch Renwick =

New Zealand cricketer (born 1993)

Personal information
- Full name: Mitchell Renwick
- Born: 23 February 1993 (age 33); Palmerston North, New Zealand
- Batting: Right-handed
- Role: Batsman, occasional wicket-keeper

Domestic team information
- Years: Team
- 2015/16–2017/18: Central Districts
- 2018/19–2021/22: Otago

Career statistics
Competition	FC	LA	T20
Matches	41	33	10
Runs scored	1,842	837	110
Batting average	25.23	26.15	13.75
100s/50s	3/5	0/4	0/0
Top score	134	75	42
Catches/stumpings	44/1	31/5	2/2
- Source: Cricinfo, 22 September 2022

Mitchell Renwick (born 23 February 1993) is a New Zealand cricketer who has played first-class cricket since 2016. He is a batsman and occasional wicket-keeper.

Renwick was born in Palmerston North and attended Palmerston North Boys' High School. He made his first-class cricket debut for Central Districts on 20 February 2016 in the 2015–16 Plunket Shield. In June 2018, he was awarded a contract with Otago for the 2018–19 season. He made his List A debut for Otago in the 2018–19 Ford Trophy on 24 October 2018. He made his Twenty20 debut for Otago in the 2018–19 Super Smash on 23 December 2018. In March 2019, in the final round of the 2018–19 Plunket Shield season, he scored his maiden century in first-class cricket, making 131 off 186 balls.

Renwick played Hawke Cup cricket for Manawatū from 2012 to 2018, and was a member of the Manawatū side that won the Hawke Cup in 2013–14 and 2014–15. In September 2022 he was appointed coach of Manawatū.
