= Navin Patel (cricketer) =

New Zealander cricketer (born 1994)

Personal information
- Full name: Navin Arun Patel
- Born: 3 September 1994 (age 32); Birmingham, West Midlands, England
- Source: Cricinfo, 22 December 2015

Navin Patel (born 3 September 1994) is a New Zealand cricketer who plays for Central Districts.

== Biography ==
Born in England in 1994, Patel moved to New Zealand during his childhood and obtained a bachelor's degree in commerce and science from Victoria University.

Patel made his first-class debut on 17 December 2015 in the 2015–16 Plunket Shield. In 2016, he was contracted by the Central Stags but found limited game time. He made his List A debut for Central Districts on 18 January 2017 in the 2016–17 Ford Trophy.

In 2017, Patel participated in the 2017 Indoor Cricket World Cup in Dubai for New Zealand.

In 2019, he transitioned to a career with finance firm Leumi ABL, specializing in investment banking and stock broking.
