= Shawn Hicks =

New Zealand cricketer

Personal information
- Born: 10 July 1995 (age 31); Centurion, South Africa
- Batting: Right-handed
- Bowling: Right-arm medium-fast

Domestic team information
- Years: Team
- 2015/16–2016/17: Auckland
- 2017/18–2018/19: Otago
- Source: CricInfo, 21 December 2023

Shawn Hicks (born 10 July 1995) is a South African-born former cricketer who played in New Zealand for Auckland and Otago between the 2015–16 and 2018–19 seasons. After being forced to retire from the professional game at the age of 23 he has worked as a cricket coach and administrator.

Hicks was born at Centurion in 1995 and played under-13 cricket for Northerns in South Africa before moving to New Zealand with his family, attending Auckland Grammar School. An all-round sportsman at school, he was a "very promising" rugby union player and was selected for a national training squad. He played age-group cricket for Auckland and represented the New Zealand national under-19 cricket team before making his first-class debut on 17 December 2015 in the 2015–16 Plunket Shield. He made his List A debut on 27 December 2015 in the 2015–16 Ford Trophy. In June 2018, he was awarded a contract with Otago for the 2018–19 season, his last in senior cricket, and, aged 23, was forced to retire from the game at the end of the season as a result of a series of concussions, following on from similar injuries he received whilst playing rugby.

In 17 first-class matches Hicks scored 651 runs and took seven wickets. He also played in 26 List A and 16 Twenty20 matches in his senior career. Following his retirement from cricket he completed a degree in accounting, worked in administration for a year and has since moved to work for Sport Otago. He has coached the Otago under-17 side, the John McGlashan College team, and in 2022–23 coached University-Grange Cricket Club, a leading Dunedin club side, as well as assisting with the coaching of the Otago Sparks, the province's top-level women's side.
