= Zak Gibson =

New Zealand cricketer (born 1997)

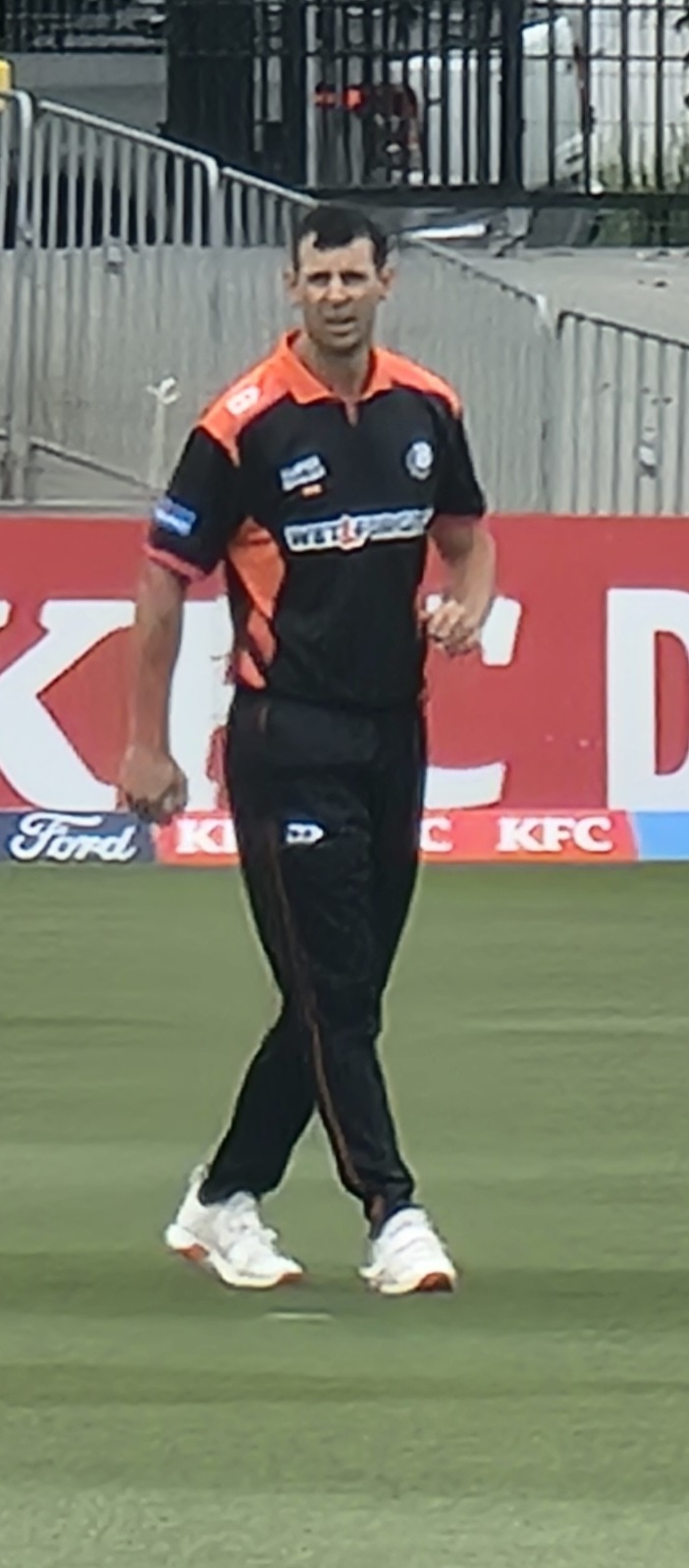
- Gibson playing for Northern Districts in 2025.

Personal information
- Full name: Zakary Neil Gibson
- Born: 19 March 1997 (age 29); Hamilton, New Zealand
- Batting: Right-handed
- Bowling: Right-arm medium
- Relatives: Jake Gibson (cousin)

Domestic team information
- Years: Team
- 2015/16–: Northern Districts
- Source: Cricinfo, 20 October 2023

Zakary Neil Gibson (born 19 March 1997) is a New Zealand cricketer. He made his first-class debut for Northern Districts on 15 March 2016 in the 2015–16 Plunket Shield. He made his Twenty20 debut for Northern Districts on 4 December 2016 in the 2016–17 Super Smash. He made his List A debut for Northern Districts on 15 January 2017 in the 2016–17 Ford Trophy. In June 2018, he was awarded a contract with Northern Districts for the 2018–19 season.
