= Ken McClure =

New Zealand cricketer

Personal information
- Born: 25 October 1994 (age 32); Christchurch, New Zealand
- Source: Cricinfo, 29 October 2015

Ken McClure (born 25 October 1994) is a New Zealand first-class cricketer who plays for Canterbury. He made his first-class debut on 15 October 2015 in the 2015–16 Plunket Shield. He made his List A debut on 17 January 2016 in the 2015–16 Ford Trophy. In March 2018, he scored his maiden double century in first-class cricket, batting for Canterbury in the 2017–18 Plunket Shield season.

In June 2018, he was awarded a contract with Canterbury for the 2018–19 season. In June 2020, he was offered a contract by Canterbury ahead of the 2020–21 domestic cricket season. In November 2020, McClure was named in the New Zealand A cricket team for practice matches against the touring West Indies team.
