= Cody Andrews =

New Zealand cricketer (born 1987)

Personal information
- Born: 6 September 1987 (age 39); Gisborne, New Zealand
- Source: Cricinfo, 21 March 2016

Cody Andrews (born 6 September 1987) is a New Zealand former cricketer. He made his List A debut on 20 January 2016 in the 2015–16 Ford Trophy. He made his first-class debut for Auckland on 5 November 2016 in the 2016–17 Plunket Shield season.
