= Bharat Popli =

New Zealander cricketer (born 1990)

Personal information
- Born: 30 May 1990 (age 36); New Delhi, India
- Source: Cricinfo, 22 December 2015

Bharat Popli (born 30 May 1990) is an Indian-born New Zealand first-class cricketer who played for Northern Districts.

Educated at Tauranga Boys' College, Popli scored the most runs in the 2015–16 Plunket Shield season, with a total of 1,149. He made his List A debut for Northern Districts on 22 January 2017 in the 2016–17 Ford Trophy. In June 2018, he was awarded a contract with Northern Districts for the 2018–19 season.

Popli announced his retirement from professional cricket in June 2026.
