= Craig Smith (cricketer) =

New Zealander cricketer (born 1985)

Personal information
- Full name: Craig Murray Smith
- Born: 9 January 1985 (age 41); Oamaru, North Otago, New Zealand
- Batting: Right-handed
- Bowling: Left-arm medium

Domestic team information
- Years: Team
- 2001/02–2008/09: North Otago
- 2004/05–2015/16: Otago
- 2009/10–2015/16: Southland
- 2016/17–2017/18: North Otago
- 2024-: Willows Cricket Club
- Source: Cricinfo, 30 October 2015

Craig Smith (born 9 January 1985) is a New Zealand first-class cricketer who played top-level cricket for Otago between the 2004–05 and 2015–16 seasons.

Smith was born at Oamaru in North Otago in 1985 and educated at St Kevin's College in the town. He made his Hawke Cup debut for North Otago in the 2001–02 season and in 2003–04 played five Youth One Day International matches for the New Zealand under-19 team at the 2004 Under-19 Cricket World Cup. In 2004–05 he made his senior representative debut for Otago, having played age-group cricket for the provincial team from 2000–01.

Playing for the Otago team between 2004–05 and 2010–11 and then being recalled for two season from 2014–15 to 2015–16, Smith made a total of 24 first-class, 16 List A and six Twenty20 appearances. Primarily a bowler, he took 46 first-class and 17 List A wickets. He played Hawke Cup matches for North Otago until the end of the 2008–09 season, after which he moved to Invercargill to take up a teaching post at Southland Boys' High School. He played for Southland in the competition until moving back to Oamaru to teach at St Kevin's College in early 2016, playing for North Otago again until the end of the 2017–18 season.
