= Fraser Colson =

New Zealand cricketer (born 1990)

Personal information
- Born: 19 March 1990 (age 36); Lower Hutt, New Zealand
- Source: Cricinfo, 8 February 2016

Fraser Colson (born 19 March 1990) is a New Zealand cricketer who plays for Wellington. He made his first-class debut on 7 November 2013 in the 2013–14 Plunket Shield. He made his Twenty20 debut on 21 December 2019, for Wellington in the 2019–20 Super Smash.

In June 2020, he was offered a contract by Wellington ahead of the 2020–21 domestic cricket season.
