= Dane Hutchinson =

New Zealander cricketer (born 1986)

Personal information
- Full name: Dane Samuel Hutchinson
- Born: 8 October 1986 (age 40); Brisbane, Australia
- Batting: Right-handed
- Bowling: Right-arm fast-medium
- Role: Allrounder
- Source: Cricinfo, 30 October 2015

Dane Hutchinson (born 8 October 1986) is a New Zealand first-class cricketer who plays for Wellington.
