= Bevan Small =

New Zealander cricketer (born 1992)

Personal information
- Full name: Bevan James Small
- Born: 24 February 1992 (age 34); Feilding, New Zealand
- Batting: Right-handed
- Bowling: Right-arm medium-fast

Domestic team information
- Years: Team
- 2010/11–2023/24: Central Districts

Career statistics
Competition	FC	LA	T20
Matches	23	39	48
Runs scored	449	282	183
Batting average	17.96	13.42	12.20
100s/50s	0/2	0/0	0/0
Top score	76	37	21*
Balls bowled	2,959	1,645	761
Wickets	53	51	40
Bowling average	34.54	30.72	27.45
5 wickets in innings	1	1	0
10 wickets in match	0	–	–
Best bowling	5/61	5/45	4/22
Catches/stumpings	9/–	16/–	11/–
- Source: Cricinfo, 8 September 2026

Bevan James Small (born 24 February 1992) is a former New Zealand cricketer who played for Central Districts from 2010–11 to 2023–24.

Small was a right-arm medium-fast bowler and right-handed lower-order batsman. He began his career principally as a bowler, but after a series of injuries his bowling fell away and he developed his batting. His best first-class bowling figures were 5 for 61 and 2 for 35 when Central Districts defeated Auckland in the 2012–13 Plunket Shield. His highest score was 76 against Northern Districts in 2015–16.

While fielding as the twelfth man in January 2012 during the New Zealand domestic HRV Twenty20 competition as a 19-year-old, Small made a spectacular catch assist on the boundary line. The catch was completed by teammate Michael Mason. The Laws of Cricket indicate that a catch can be initiated outside of the boundary line so long as the player is airborne whenever they are touching the ball; this must remain so until the ball is back inside the boundary (either completed by the same player or, as was the case with Small, completed by a teammate). The West Australian thought it was a candidate for the "greatest cricket catch ever", while a commentator during the match called it "possibly the most brilliant piece of fielding I've ever seen". The video has received millions of views across various online uploads.

Small also represented Manawatu in the Hawke Cup from 2009–10 to 2023–24, captaining them in 2023–24 when he top-scored with 51 and took 6 for 66 in their unsuccessful challenge against Hawke's Bay.

In 2025, Small was awarded the New Zealand Cricket Players' Association scholarship that encourages former players to take up umpiring.
