= Anaru Kitchen =

New Zealand cricketer

Personal information
- Full name: Anaru Kyle Kitchen
- Born: 21 February 1984 (age 42); Auckland, New Zealand
- Batting: Right-handed
- Bowling: Slow left-arm orthodox
- Role: Top-order batsman

International information
- National side: New Zealand (2017–2018)
- T20I debut (cap 75): 29 December 2017 v West Indies
- Last T20I: 28 January 2018 v Pakistan
- T20I shirt no.: 41

Domestic team information
- Years: Team
- 2008/09–2014/15: Auckland (squad no. 6)
- 2015/16–2021/22: Otago

Career statistics
Competition	T20I	FC	LA	T20
Matches	5	92	119	137
Runs scored	38	5,194	3,303	2,344
Batting average	12.66	33.72	32.06	21.11
100s/50s	0/0	10/26	5/16	0/7
Top score	16	207	143*	66
Balls bowled	36	3,039	2,450	1,230
Wickets	2	36	57	38
Bowling average	23.00	49.91	37.92	41.73
5 wickets in innings	0	0	0	0
10 wickets in match	0	0	0	0
Best bowling	1/3	3/19	4/23	4/11
Catches/stumpings	3/–	75/–	50/–	62/–
- Source: CricketArchive, 13 May 2022

Anaru Kyle Kitchen (born 21 February 1984) is a New Zealand former professional cricketer who most recently played for the Otago cricket team as a right-handed middle-order batsman and a slow left-arm orthodox bowler. He plays for North East Valley Cricket Club. In February 2022, Kitchen announced his retirement from domestic cricket at the end of the 2021/22 season in New Zealand.

== Domestic career ==
He made his debut for Auckland in their list A match against Canterbury in December 2008, top scoring with 69 from 104 balls.

In June 2018, he was awarded a contract with Otago for the 2018–19 season. In June 2020, he was offered a contract by Otago ahead of the 2020–21 domestic cricket season.

== International career ==
In December 2017, he was named in New Zealand's Twenty20 International (T20I) squad for their series against the West Indies. He made his T20I debut for New Zealand against the West Indies on 29 December 2017.
