= Matt Taylor (New Zealand cricketer) =

New Zealand cricketer

Personal information
- Born: 18 February 1992 (age 34); Porirua, New Zealand
- Batting: Right-handed
- Bowling: Right-arm fast medium

Domestic team information
- Years: Team
- 2014-present: Wellington
- Source: Cricinfo, 30 October 2015

Matt Taylor (born 18 February 1992) is a New Zealand first-class cricketer who plays for Wellington.
