= Ashley Mehrotra =

Cricket umpire (born 1969)

Personal information
- Born: 29 November 1969 (age 56); Kanpur, India
- Role: Umpire

Umpiring information
- WODIs umpired: 7 (2015–2021)
- WT20Is umpired: 6 (2014–2021)
- Source: ESPNcricinfo, 22 February 2023

Ashley Mehrotra (born 29 November 1969) is an Indian-born, New Zealand cricket umpire. He has stood in matches in the Plunket Shield.
