= Michael Guptill-Bunce =

New Zealander cricketer (born 1989)

Personal information
- Full name: Michael Luke Guptill-Bunce
- Born: 7 April 1989 (age 37); Auckland, New Zealand
- Batting: Right-handed
- Role: Wicket-keeper

Domestic team information
- Years: Team
- 2012/13–2018/19: Auckland

Career statistics
Competition	FC	LA	T20
Matches	38	11	5
Runs scored	2,290	253	36
Batting average	32.71	23.00	5.60
100s/50s	3/15	0/2	0/0
Top score	189	73	11
Catches/stumpings	35/–	5/–	12/1
- Source: Cricinfo, 25 February 2021

Michael Luke Guptill-Bunce (born 7 April 1989) is a New Zealand cricketer who plays for Auckland. He made his Twenty20 debut for Auckland on 4 December 2016 in the 2016–17 Super Smash.

He was the leading run-scorer in the 2017–18 Plunket Shield season for Auckland, with 517 runs in ten matches. In June 2018, he was awarded a contract with Auckland for the 2018–19 season. In September 2018, he was named in the Auckland Aces' squad for the 2018 Abu Dhabi T20 Trophy.

He is the cousin of fellow opener, Martin Guptill.
