= Jack Hunter (cricketer) =

New Zealand cricketer (born 1995)

Personal information
- Full name: Jack Sean Hunter
- Born: 28 April 1995 (age 31); Dunedin, Otago, New Zealand
- Batting: Right-handed
- Bowling: Right-arm medium

Domestic team information
- Years: Team
- 2015/16–2018/19: Otago

Career statistics
Competition	FC	LA	T20
Matches	9	12	6
Runs scored	22	47	7
Batting average	2.75	15.66	–
100s/50s	0/0	0/0	0/0
Top score	10*	11	7*
Balls bowled	1,080	499	90
Wickets	16	16	4
Bowling average	36.93	25.10	40.00
5 wickets in innings	0	0	0
10 wickets in match	0	0	0
Best bowling	4/47	4/51	3/35
Catches/stumpings	5/–	2/–	0/–
- Source: CricInfo, 14 July 2019

Jack Sean Hunter (born 28 April 1995) is a New Zealand Under-19s and first-class cricketer. He played Under-19 Cricket World Cup in 2014. He was born in Dunedin, Otago and made his senior cricket debut for Otago in 2015 having played age-group cricket for the team. He went on to make his List A debut in January 2017 in the 2016–17 Ford Trophy and his Twenty20 debut in the 2017–18 Super Smash in December 2017.
