= Tony Gillies =

New Zealand cricket umpire (born 1970)

Personal information
- Born: 25 April 1970 (age 56); Sydney, Australia

Umpiring information
- WODIs umpired: 6 (2015–2019)
- WT20Is umpired: 3 (2015)
- Source: ESPNcricinfo, 22 October 2016

Tony Gillies (born 25 April 1970) is a New Zealand cricket umpire. He has stood in matches in the Plunket Shield.
