= Joe Walker (cricketer) =

New Zealand cricketer (born 1992)

Personal information
- Full name: Josef Grant Walker
- Born: 6 September 1992 (age 34); Hamilton, New Zealand
- Source: Cricinfo, 10 March 2016

Joe Walker (born 6 September 1992) is a New Zealand cricketer who plays first-class for Northern Districts. He made his List A debut for Northern Districts on 4 February 2017 in the 2016–17 Ford Trophy. In June 2018, he was awarded a contract with Northern Districts for the 2018–19 season.
