= Tim Johnston (cricketer) =

New Zealander cricketer (born 1990)

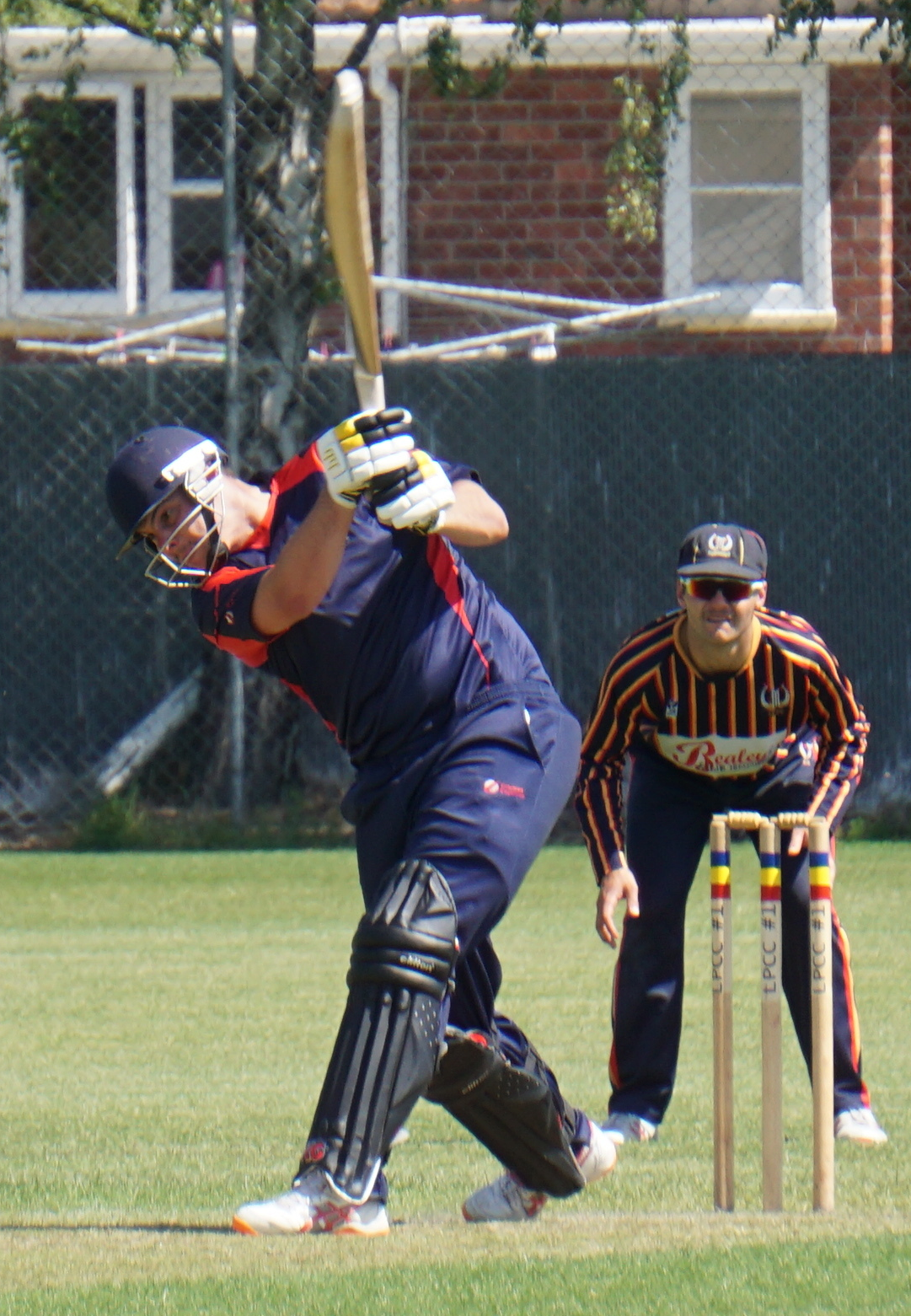

Personal information
- Full name: Timothy Glyn Johnston
- Born: 28 October 1990 (age 36); Christchurch, New Zealand
- Batting: Right-handed
- Bowling: Right-arm offbreak
- Role: Allrounder

Domestic team information
- Years: Team
- 2012/13–2017/18: Canterbury

Career statistics
Competition	FC	LA	T20
Matches	32	20	22
Runs scored	860	177	119
Batting average	22.05	13.61	9.91
100s/50s	0/3	0/0	0/0
Top score	76	32	21
Balls bowled	5535	960	384
Wickets	56	30	13
Bowling average	53.19	26.10	39.15
5 wickets in innings	2	0	0
10 wickets in match	0	0	0
Best bowling	5/78	3/30	2/20
Catches/stumpings	16/–	4/–	11/–
- Source: Cricinfo, 29 October 2015

Timothy Glyn Johnston (born 28 October 1990) is a New Zealand former first-class cricketer who represented Canterbury.

In recognition of his performance, Johnston was honored as the Canterbury Bowler of the Year for the year 2018 during the CCA Annual Awards. For the 2018–19 season, Johnston became a member of the Sydenham Cricket Club in Christchurch, New Zealand. He assumed the role of Premier Men's captain for the subsequent 2019–20 season.
