= Tony Goodin =

New Zealand cricketer (born 1988)

Personal information
- Full name: Tony Colin Goodin
- Born: 23 November 1988 (age 37); Hamilton, New Zealand
- Batting: Right-handed
- Bowling: Right-arm fast-medium

Domestic team information
- Years: Team
- 2012/13–2016/17: Northern Districts cricket team
- Source: Cricinfo, 2 October 2024

Tony Colin Goodin (born 23 November 1988) is a New Zealand former first-class cricketer who played for Northern Districts.
