= Ryan Duffy (cricketer) =

New Zealand cricketer (born 1991)

Personal information
- Full name: Ryan Mitchell Duffy
- Born: 25 March 1991 (age 35); Frankton, Otago
- Batting: Right-handed
- Role: Wicket-keeper
- Relatives: Jacob Duffy (brother)

Domestic team information
- Years: Team
- 2009/10–2019/20: Southland
- 2013/14–2016/17: Otago
- FC debut: 19 November 2013 Otago v Canterbury
- Last FC: 29 October 2016 Otago v Auckland
- LA debut: 30 December 2014 Otago v Wellington
- Last LA: 28 January 2017 Otago v Central Districts

Career statistics
Competition	FC	LA	T20
Matches	18	4	2
Runs scored	905	59	10
Batting average	30.16	14.75	10.00
100s/50s	1/4	0/0	0/0
Top score	104	31	10
Balls bowled	12	54	18
Wickets	0	0	2
Bowling average	–	–	12.50
5 wickets in innings	–	–	0
10 wickets in match	–	–	0
Best bowling	–	–	1/7
Catches/stumpings	16/–	5/–	0/–
- Source: CricInfo, 7 June 2022

Ryan Mitchell Duffy (born 25 March 1991), is a New Zealand cricketer who played for Otago between the 2013/14 and 2016/17 seasons.

== Early life ==
Duffy was born at Frankton in 1991 and is the older brother of Jacob Duffy who has played for Otago and for the New Zealand national cricket team.

== Career ==
Duffy made his senior debut for Otago in a Plunket Shield match against Canterbury in November 2013, opening the batting and scoring 18 and 16 not out in the match. He went on to play 18 first-class, four List A and two Twenty20 matches for the side, his final appearances coming in the Ford Trophy in January 2017.

Primarily a wicket-keeper batsman, Duffy scored a single century, making 104 runs against Wellington in March 2016. He bowled occasionally, taking a wicket in each of his Twenty20 matches. He has played club cricket for Kaikorai Cricket Club and in the Hawke Cup played for Southland between 2009/10 and 2019/20. He played for a New Zealand XI in a warm up match for the touring Bangladesh side in December 2016.
