= Nelson Park, Napier =

Cricket ground in Napier, Hawke's Bay, New Zealand

Coordinates: 39.4984°S 176.9102°E

Nelson Park
- Interactive map of Nelson Park

Ground information
- Location: Napier, New Zealand
- Country: New Zealand
- Establishment: 1920 (first recorded match)

Team information
Central Districts Women	(2010)
Central Districts	(1986–present)
Hawke's Bay	(1920–1921)
- As of 2 November 2011; Source: Ground profile

Nelson Park is a cricket ground in Napier, Hawke's Bay, New Zealand. It is situated in Napier South, about 600 metres south-west of the Napier CBD, and about 200 metres north-west of Napier's main sports stadium, McLean Park.

== Establishment ==
A syndicate reclaimed the Napier South area from the Ahuriri Lagoon and swamp in 1908. In 1909, the town council purchased 20 acres for a park named in honour of a member of the reclamation syndicate, the Hawke's Bay pioneering settler William Nelson.

== Playing history ==
The ground first held a first-class match when Hawke's Bay played Wellington in 1920, and Hawke's Bay also played a first-class match there in 1921 against the touring Australians. In the 1920s Nelson Park was regarded as one of the best cricket wickets in New Zealand.

Senior cricket was next played at Nelson Park nearly 65 years later when Central Districts played Wellington in the 1985–86 Shell Trophy. It has been a regular first-class venue since 2007. As of December 2018, Central Districts has played 20 first-class matches there, lifting the Plunket Shield at the venue in 2017–18. A 2011-12 Ford Trophy match was held between the Central Districts Stags and the Wellington Firebirds, which finished in a no result.

Five Youth One Day Internationals have been played at Nelson Park, all in the 2010 Under-19 World Cup. The ground has also been used a home venue for Central Districts Women in the State League in the 2010/11 season.

Nelson Park is the home of the Hawke's Bay Cricket Association, and since the 1980s it has been the usual home ground for Hawke's Bay in the Hawke Cup. There are five cricket pitches in the park, with some overlap among the five fields.

== Other uses ==
After the 1931 Hawke's Bay earthquake, 500 tents were erected on Nelson Park to provide emergency accommodation for displaced residents.

As well as cricket grounds, the park precinct also includes a pétanque club and tennis courts.

== Sources ==
- Campbell, M.D.N. (1975). Story of Napier, 1874–1974. Napier: Martin Printing Company.
