= Ben Smith (New Zealand cricketer) =

New Zealand cricketer

Personal information
- Full name: Benjamin Seth Smith
- Born: 7 January 1991 (age 35); Hamilton, New Zealand
- Batting: Right-handed
- Bowling: Right-arm off break
- Role: Batsman

Domestic team information
- Years: Team
- 2010/11–2023: Central Districts (squad no. 9)
- FC debut: 28 March 2011 Central Districts v Wellington
- LA debut: 25 November 2011 Central Districts v Canterbury

Career statistics
Competition	FC	LA	T20
Matches	71	71	42
Runs scored	3,506	2,047	693
Batting average	31.02	31.01	21.00
100s/50s	6/17	3/8	0/3
Top score	244	149*	80
Balls bowled	132	–	–
Wickets	1	–	–
Bowling average	59.00	–	–
5 wickets in innings	0	–	–
10 wickets in match	0	–	–
Best bowling	1/17	–	–
Catches/stumpings	40/2	24/–	15/–
- Source: ESPNcricinfo, 4 October 2024

Benjamin Seth Smith (born 7 January 1991) is a New Zealand first-class cricketer who plays for Central Districts. In June 2018, he was awarded a contract with Central Districts for the 2018–19 season. On 17 November 2019, in the 2019–20 Ford Trophy, Smith scored his first century in List A cricket.
