= Donovan Grobbelaar =

New Zealand cricketer (born 1983)

Personal information
- Full name: Donovan Juan Grobbelaar
- Born: 30 July 1983 (age 43); Standerton, South Africa
- Batting: Right-handed
- Bowling: Left-arm medium
- Relatives: Glenn Phillips (brother-in-law); Dale Phillips (brother-in-law)

Domestic team information
- Years: Team
- 2012/13–2018/19: Auckland
- FC debut: 31 October 2013 Auckland v Northern Districts
- Last FC: 30 October 2017 Auckland v Central Districts
- LA debut: 26 February 2013 Auckland v Canterbury
- Last LA: 17 February 2017 Auckland v Central Districts

Career statistics
Competition	FC	LA	T20
Matches	33	45	61
Runs scored	1,191	895	449
Batting average	25.89	24.86	21.38
100s/50s	1/7	0/3	0/0
Top score	101	56	38*
Balls bowled	3,953	1,748	1,045
Wickets	63	42	53
Bowling average	33.69	36.64	27.03
5 wickets in innings	0	0	0
10 wickets in match	0	0	0
Best bowling	3/27	4/65	4/10
Catches/stumpings	20/–	20/–	39/–
- Source: Cricinfo, 8 September 2020

Donovan Grobbelaar (born 30 July 1983) is a New Zealand former cricketer who played for Auckland. He made his List A debut in February 2013 in the 2012–13 Ford Trophy.

Beginning in the 2021/22 season Grobbelaar became the Performance and Talent Coach of the Auckland Hearts.
