= Brad Wilson (cricketer) =

New Zealand cricketer (born 1985)

Personal information
- Full name: Bradley Svend Wilson
- Born: 10 April 1985 (age 41); Auckland, New Zealand
- Batting: Right-handed
- Bowling: Right-arm off break
- Role: Batsman

Domestic team information
- Years: Team
- 2004/05–2014/15: Northern Districts
- 2015/16–2018/19: Otago

Career statistics
Competition	FC	LA	T20
Matches	111	49	75
Runs scored	6,283	979	1,487
Batting average	32.22	21.28	25.63
100s/50s	14/37	1/3	0/4
Top score	165	126	91
Catches/stumpings	98/–	25/–	29/–
- Source: ESPNcricinfo, 30 April 2022

Bradley Svend Wilson (born 10 April 1985) is a former cricketer. He played for New Zealand in the Under-19 Cricket World Cup in 2004. In 2004–05 he was selected to play first-class cricket for Northern Districts and made 96 against Otago on his first-class debut. His later innings have, however, were disappointing, but he was retained by Northern Districts for the 2005–06 season. Wilson also played for Northland in the Hawke Cup. He was born in Auckland.

Wilson captained Northern Districts to victory in the 2011–12 Plunket Shield season. In June 2018, he was awarded a contract with Otago for the 2018–19 season.
