= Andrew Mathieson =

New Zealand cricketer (born 1989)

Personal information
- Full name: Andrew William Mathieson
- Born: 10 October 1989 (age 37); Hamilton, New Zealand
- Batting: Right-handed
- Bowling: Right-arm medium
- Role: Bowler

International information
- National side: New Zealand
- Only ODI (cap 186): 20 June 2015 v England

Domestic team information
- Years: Team
- 2010/11: Northern Districts
- 2012/13–2016/17: Central Districts

Career statistics
Competition	ODI	FC	LA	T20
Matches	1	23	27	11
Runs scored	0	197	38	9
Batting average	–	21.88	5.42	4.50
100s/50s	0/0	0/0	0/0	0/0
Top score	0*	27	14*	7
Balls bowled	24	3,113	1,296	210
Wickets	1	46	44	14
Bowling average	40.00	49.43	31.52	22.71
5 wickets in innings	0	1	1	0
10 wickets in match	0	0	0	0
Best bowling	1/40	5/39	5/66	3/18
Catches/stumpings	0/–	12/–	10/–	1/–
- Source: ESPNcricinfo, 11 May 2017

Andrew William Mathieson (born 10 October 1989) is a New Zealand former international and first-class cricketer.

He made his One Day International (ODI) debut against England on 20 June 2015. With his first delivery, he removed Jason Roy for his first ODI wicket, and finished with figures of 1 for 40 in 4 overs for the match.
