= Luke Woodcock =

New Zealand cricketer (born 1982)

Personal information
- Full name: Luke James Woodcock
- Born: 19 March 1982 (age 44); Wellington, New Zealand
- Batting: Left-handed
- Bowling: Left-arm orthodox spin
- Role: All-rounder

International information
- National side: New Zealand (2010–2011)
- ODI debut (cap 164): 29 January 2011 v Pakistan
- Last ODI: 25 October 2011 v Zimbabwe
- T20I debut (cap 47): 28 December 2010 v Pakistan
- Last T20I: 17 October 2011 v Zimbabwe

Domestic team information
- Years: Team
- 2001/02–2019: Wellington

Career statistics
Competition	ODI	T20I	FC	LA
Matches	4	3	144	129
Runs scored	14	–	7,604	2,008
Batting average	14.00	–	35.69	24.48
100s/50s	0/0	–	11/41	1/11
Top score	11	–	220*	102
Balls bowled	164	60	12,827	4,913
Wickets	3	1	141	105
Bowling average	51.66	70.00	43.57	38.02
5 wickets in innings	0	0	0	0
10 wickets in match	0	0	0	0
Best bowling	2/58	1/30	4/3	4/36
Catches/stumpings	0/–	1/–	72/–	40/–
- Source: ESPNcricinfo, 10 January 2019

Luke James Woodcock (born 19 March 1982) is a former New Zealand cricketer who has played for New Zealand in limited over internationals. He also played for Wellington in New Zealand's domestic competitions. An all-rounder, he batted left handed and bowled left-arm orthodox spin. In March 2019, Woodcock announced his retirement from the game.

== Domestic career ==
In October 2017, in the 2017–18 Plunket Shield season, he and Michael Papps made an opening partnership of 432 runs for Wellington. This was the highest opening partnership and the highest partnership for any wicket in first-class cricket in New Zealand.

The following month, he played in his 128th game for Wellington, the most first-class appearances for a player with one team in New Zealand.

In June 2018, he was awarded a contract with Wellington for the 2018–19 season.

== International career ==
He has represented New Zealand in the One Day International and Twenty20 International forms of the game, making his debuts against Pakistan during the 2010–11 season.
