= Brent Arnel =

New Zealand cricketer

Personal information
- Full name: Brent John Arnel
- Born: 3 January 1979 (age 47); Te Awamutu, New Zealand
- Height: 1.96 m (6 ft 5 in)
- Batting: Right-handed
- Bowling: Right-arm medium-fast
- Role: Bowler

International information
- National side: New Zealand (2010–2012)
- Test debut (cap 246): 19 March 2010 v Australia
- Last Test: 15 May 2012 v South Africa

Domestic team information
- Years: Team
- 2005/06–2012/13: Northern Districts
- 2013/14–2016/17: Wellington
- 2017/18: Northern Districts

Career statistics
| Competition | Test | FC | LA | T20 |
|---|---|---|---|---|
| Matches | 6 | 111 | 93 | 93 |
| Runs scored | 45 | 686 | 157 | 44 |
| Batting average | 5.62 | 8.46 | 9.23 | 5.50 |
| 100s/50s | 0/0 | 0/0 | 0/0 | 0/0 |
| Top score | 8* | 32* | 18 | 7* |
| Balls bowled | 1,008 | 22,644 | 4,704 | 1,976 |
| Wickets | 9 | 394 | 129 | 85 |
| Bowling average | 62.88 | 26.89 | 30.93 | 31.16 |
| 5 wickets in innings | 0 | 16 | 0 | 0 |
| 10 wickets in match | 0 | 1 | 0 | 0 |
| Best bowling | 4/95 | 8/81 | 4/26 | 4/22 |
| Catches/stumpings | 3/– | 30/– | 14/– | 13/– |
- Source: Cricinfo, 30 September 2024

Brent John Arnel (born 3 January 1979) is a New Zealand former professional cricketer who has played six Test matches for the national side. A fast bowler, he represented Northern Districts and Wellington in a domestic career that began in 2006.

== Early life ==
Arnel was born in Te Awamutu. According to his ESPNCricinfo player profile, "as a 10-year-old, Brent Arnel was kicked out of junior cricket because he bowled too fast". A promising junior cricketer, Arnel played club cricket in Hamilton with Fraser Tech, and after moving to Wellington he began playing for Onslow Cricket Club.

== Domestic career ==
He made his first class debut for Northern Districts in 2006, playing against Canterbury. After a strong performance in the 2007–08 season in which he took the most wickets in the State Championship, he was selected for the New Zealand A tour to India.

Along with Seth Rance, he was the joint-highest wicket-taker in the 2016–17 Super Smash, with fifteen dismissals, whilst playing for the Wellington Firebirds

== International career ==
In 2009, after success against the England Lions he was called into the New Zealand Test squad but did not end up playing. During the Bangladesh tour of New Zealand in 2009–10 he was again called up to cover an injured player, but was not selected to play. He finally made his Test debut against Australia at the Basin Reserve in Wellington on 19 March 2010.
