= Hamish Bennett (cricketer) =

New Zealand cricketer

Personal information
- Full name: Hamish Kyle Bennett
- Born: 22 February 1987 (age 39); Timaru, New Zealand
- Height: 1.91 m (6 ft 3 in)
- Batting: Left-handed
- Bowling: Right-arm medium-fast
- Role: Bowler

International information
- National side: New Zealand (2010–2021)
- Only Test (cap 247): 4 November 2010 v India
- ODI debut (cap 163): 14 October 2010 v Bangladesh
- Last ODI: 11 February 2020 v India
- ODI shirt no.: 52
- T20I debut (cap 83): 24 January 2020 v India
- Last T20I: 8 September 2021 v Bangladesh
- T20I shirt no.: 33 (previously 52)

Domestic team information
- Years: Team
- 2005/06–2015/16: Canterbury
- 2016/17–2021/22: Wellington

Career statistics
Competition	Test	ODI	FC	LA
Matches	1	19	79	112
Runs scored	4	10	446	90
Batting average	4.00	5.00	9.69	6.42
100s/50s	0/0	0/0	0/0	0/0
Top score	4	4*	30*	20*
Balls bowled	90	892	13,151	4,806
Wickets	0	33	261	160
Bowling average	–	24.84	28.49	26.16
5 wickets in innings	–	0	8	1
10 wickets in match	–	0	1	0
Best bowling	–	4/16	7/50	6/45
Catches/stumpings	0/–	3/–	17/–	17/–
- Source: ESPNcricinfo, 24 August 2022

Hamish Kyle Bennett (born 22 February 1987) is a New Zealand former international cricketer who played for the New Zealand national cricket team. He played for Wellington in New Zealand domestic competitions. Earlier in his career he represented New Zealand in the 2006 ICC Under-19 Cricket World Cup in Sri Lanka.

== Domestic career ==
Bennett initially played domestic cricket for Canterbury. In June 2018 however, he was awarded a contract with Wellington for the 2018–19 season.

He was the leading wicket-taker in the 2018–19 Ford Trophy tournament, with 28 dismissals in twelve matches. He was also the leading wicket-taker in the 2019–20 Super Smash tournament, with seventeen dismissals in eleven matches.

In June 2020, he was offered a contract by Wellington ahead of the 2020–21 domestic cricket season. He officially retired from all formats of cricket in April 2022.

== International career ==
He made his first One Day International (ODI) appearance against Bangladesh in October 2010, where he was New Zealand's best performing bowler, taking three wickets. The following month he made his only Test match appearance in a drawn match against India. After bowling fifteen wicketless overs in the first innings, he was unable to bowl in the second innings because of an injury.

Bennett was included in to the New Zealand squad for 2011 ICC Cricket World Cup held on the Indian subcontinent. He took four wickets against Kenya in Chennai where he adjudged man of the match award. He returned to the ODI team in January 2014 to play the third one-day match between New Zealand and India after being sidelined for two years due to a serious back injury. In January 2020, Bennett was named in New Zealand's Twenty20 International (T20I) squad for their series against India, after last representing New Zealand in May 2017. He made his T20I debut on 24 January 2020.

== Coaching ==
Bennett is the current bowling coach of the Wellington team.
