= Derek de Boorder =

New Zealand cricketer (born 1985)

Personal information
- Full name: Derek Charles de Boorder
- Born: 25 October 1985 (age 41); Hastings, New Zealand
- Batting: Right-handed
- Role: Wicket-keeper
- Relatives: Andrew de Boorder (brother)

Domestic team information
- Years: Team
- 2005/06: Auckland
- 2007/08–2017/18: Otago
- FC debut: 12 November 2007 Otago v Central Districts
- Last FC: 2 April 2018 Otago v Canterbury
- LA debut: 7 January 2006 Auckland v Canterbury
- Last LA: 7 February 2018 Otago v Northern Districts

Career statistics
Competition	FC	LA	T20
Matches	103	101	99
Runs scored	4,858	1,939	941
Batting average	36.80	30.29	18.82
100s/50s	4/33	0/13	0/2
Top score	146	77	67
Catches/stumpings	332/22	123/14	61/19
- Source: CricInfo, 25 June 2023

Derek Charles de Boorder (born 25 October 1985) is a New Zealand former cricketer who played primarily for Otago.

Born at Hastings and educated at Macleans College in Auckland, de Boorder played age-group cricket for Auckland from the 2001–02 season. He played for the New Zealand under-19 side during the 2004 Under-19 Cricket World Cup in Bangladesh, playing in two under-19 One Day Internationals during the competition, and was a member of the New Zealand Cricket Academy. A wicket-keeper, he made his senior debut for Auckland in January 2006, playing in a List A match against Canterbury and scoring seven runs and taking a catch in a heavy defeat―his only senior match for the side.

De Boorder was awarded a contract with the senior Auckland side for the following season but did not play for the side and in 2007–08 moved to play for Otago, replacing Gareth Hopkins who switched to play for Auckland. In 11 seasons with Otago he played in almost 300 senior matches for the side. In 99 first-class matches for Otago he scored 4,695 runs, including making four centuries, took 322 catches and made 22 stumping. His highest first-class score of 146 was made against Wellington in February 2015. In 2012–13 he played five List A matches for the New Zealand A side against India A and the following year toured India and Sri Lanka with New Zealand A. He played against the Afghanistan national side for New Zealand A in 2014 and played further matches for the side against Sri Lanka A during their tour of New Zealand in 2015–16. He played club cricket for North East Valley in Dunedin.

During the 2009–10 season de Boorder took a New Zealand record wicket-keeping eight catches in an innings playing against Wellington. The feat equalled the world record number of catches in a first-class innings. His younger brother Andrew de Boorder played for the New Zealand under-19 side and made 36 top-level appearances for Auckland between the 2007–08 and 2011–12 seasons.

Whilst playing de Boorder had studied part-time for a degree in finance and after retiring from top-level cricket after the end of the 2017–18 season, he moved to Wellington to work for ANZ Bank in the finance industry. After a year he joined the Royal New Zealand Navy, training as an officer and was commissioned as a sub-lieutenant. After initially working in the Navy Strategic Personnel Planning Cell he was posted to sea on HMNZS Otago (P148) in 2020 and HMNZS Wellington (P55) in 2021.
