= Dean Brownlie =

New Zealand cricketer

Personal information
- Full name: Dean Graham Brownlie
- Born: 30 July 1984 (age 42); Perth, Western Australia
- Batting: Right-handed
- Bowling: Right-arm medium
- Role: Batsman

International information
- National side: New Zealand (2011–2017)
- Test debut (cap 252): 1 November 2011 v Zimbabwe
- Last Test: 24 May 2013 v England
- ODI debut (cap 168): 3 February 2012 v Zimbabwe
- Last ODI: 4 March 2017 v South Africa
- T20I debut (cap 45): 26 December 2010 v Pakistan
- Last T20I: 6 December 2014 v Pakistan

Domestic team information
- Years: Team
- 2009/10–2013/14: Canterbury
- 2014/15–2020/21: Northern Districts

Career statistics
Competition	Test	ODI	T20I	FC
Matches	14	16	5	94
Runs scored	711	361	6	6,208
Batting average	29.62	25.78	1.20	40.05
100s/50s	1/4	0/1	0/0	14/36
Top score	109	63	5	334
Balls bowled	66	–	–	240
Wickets	1	–	–	1
Bowling average	52.00	–	–	180.00
5 wickets in innings	0	–	–	0
10 wickets in match	0	–	–	0
Best bowling	1/13	–	–	1/13
Catches/stumpings	17/–	6/–	3/–	121/–
- Source: Cricinfo, 26 August 2022

Dean Graham Brownlie (born 30 July 1984) is a former New Zealand international cricketer who last played for the Northern Districts cricket team in New Zealand domestic cricket. Born in Australia, he represented the New Zealand national cricket team in all three formats, qualifying to represent the team by way of his father's birthplace.

== Early career ==
Brownlie was born in Perth, Western Australia. He grew up playing both cricket and Australian rules football, representing the Mount Lawley District Cricket Club in the WACA District Cricket competition, and the West Perth Football Club at colts and reserves levels. He represented Western Australia at the 2001 Under-17 and the 2002 Under-19 national carnivals.

He played for Whitstable in the Kent Cricket League during the 2003 English cricket season as their overseas player. He made 455 runs at an average of 26.76, including one century, and also took 20 wickets.

== Domestic career ==
Brownlie moved to New Zealand in 2009 to play for Canterbury. He made his List A debut the same season in 2010, making a golden duck on debut. However, he went on to score 86* in his second match. He then scored a century in his Plunket Shield début against Northern Districts. In June 2018, he was awarded a contract with Northern Districts for the 2018–19 season.

He was the leading run-scorer for Northern Districts in the 2018–19 Ford Trophy, with 293 runs in nine matches.

== International career ==
Brownlie made his Twenty20 debut in January 2010 against Pakistan in 2010.

After playing several matches for the New Zealand A, he made his Test debut for the national team against Zimbabwe in November 2011 after an injury to Jesse Ryder, qualifying to represent New Zealand by way of his father, who was born in Christchurch. Brownlie scored 63 in his first innings on debut, and also took one wicket bowling medium pace in Zimbabwe's first innings.

He then played in the Australian test series and was New Zealand's best batsman, scoring 77 unbeaten in Brisbane.

On 5 February 2017, Brownlie replaced Martin Guptill in the final match of Chappell-Hadlee series in Hamilton, marking his first match in international level in 2 years. He also scored his first ODI half-century.
