= Michael Papps =

New Zealand cricketer

Personal information
- Full name: Michael Hugh William Papps
- Born: 2 July 1979 (age 47); Christchurch, New Zealand
- Batting: Right-handed
- Role: Opening Batsman, Wicket-keeper
- Relatives: Tim Papps (brother)

International information
- National side: New Zealand (2004–2007)
- Test debut (cap 225): 10 March 2004 v South Africa
- Last Test: 16 November 2007 v South Africa
- ODI debut (cap 137): 13 February 2004 v South Africa
- Last ODI: 26 February 2005 v Australia

Domestic team information
- Years: Team
- 1998/99–2010/11: Canterbury
- 2011/12–2017/18: Wellington

Career statistics
| Competition | Test | ODI | FC | LA |
|---|---|---|---|---|
| Matches | 8 | 6 | 188 | 166 |
| Runs scored | 246 | 207 | 12,294 | 5,810 |
| Batting average | 16.40 | 51.75 | 38.66 | 37.97 |
| 100s/50s | 0/2 | 0/2 | 33/52 | 12/32 |
| Top score | 86 | 92* | 316* | 162* |
| Catches/stumpings | 11/0 | 1/0 | 233/6 | 86/4 |
- Source: Cricinfo, 5 April 2018

Michael Hugh William Papps (born 2 July 1979) is a former New Zealand cricketer. In October 2016, he became the first player to score 10,000 runs in the Plunket Shield. In April 2018, he announced his retirement from the game.

== Domestic career ==
Papps made his first-class debut in the 1998–99 season for his local provincial club Canterbury Wizards, for which he would go on to make 6,663 runs, second most for an individual player for one province. He switched to Wellington Firebirds in July 2011 after twelves seasons with the Wizards.

In October 2017, he scored 316 not out for Wellington against Auckland in the 2017–18 Plunket Shield season. This was the highest individual score for Wellington in the Plunket Shield. Papps also became the oldest New Zealand batsman to score a triple century in first-class cricket. Papps and Luke Woodcock also made an opening partnership of 432 runs, the highest opening partnership and the highest partnership for any wicket in first-class cricket in New Zealand.

He was the leading run-scorer in the 2017–18 Plunket Shield season, his last, with 814 runs in ten matches.

== International career ==
After a successful career in the junior teams, Papps was selected for the one-day series against South Africa in 2003–04 to solve New Zealand's long-running search for a capable opening batsman to partner Stephen Fleming. He made 59 on his debut but struggled with injuries afterwards. During an ODI against Australia in Auckland in early 2005, he was hit in the head twice by Brett Lee's bouncers. A subsequent scan ruled out brain injury but he never made another ODI appearance after the incident.
