= Tarun Nethula =

New Zealand cricketer

Personal information
- Full name: Tarun Sai Nethula
- Born: 8 May 1983 (age 43); Kurnool, Andhra Pradesh, India
- Batting: Right-handed
- Bowling: Right-arm leg break
- Role: Bowler

International information
- National side: New Zealand
- ODI debut (cap 171): 6 February 2012 v Zimbabwe
- Last ODI: 7 July 2012 v West Indies
- ODI shirt no.: 36

Domestic team information
- Years: Team
- 2008/09–2009/10: Auckland
- 2010/11–2013/14: Central Districts
- 2014/15–2017/18: Auckland
- 2018/19: Northern Districts

Career statistics
Competition	ODI	FC	LA	T20
Matches	5	80	69	71
Runs scored	12	1,692	568	139
Batting average	6.00	19.67	17.75	8.17
100s/50s	0/0	1/3	0/1	0/0
Top score	9*	108	51	27
Balls bowled	264	15,093	3,521	1,474
Wickets	5	245	104	76
Bowling average	49.80	36.89	29.77	24.61
5 wickets in innings	0	11	1	1
10 wickets in match	0	2	0	0
Best bowling	2/41	6/32	5/57	6/23
Catches/stumpings	2/–	27/–	21/–	22/–
- Source: ESPNcricinfo, 7 May 2022

Tarun Sai Nethula (born 8 May 1983) is an Indian-born cricketer who has played for the New Zealand national cricket team. He started his cricket training at St. Johns Cricket Academy in Hyderabad, Telangana and moved to New Zealand at the age of 11.

He made his international debut for New Zealand in 2012 in a One Day International against Zimbabwe. He completed all ten overs, but did not take a wicket.

== Domestic career ==
He was the leading wicket-taker in the 2017–18 Ford Trophy, with 21 dismissals in ten matches for Auckland as Auckland took the title from Nethula's former team, the Central Stags. Jeet Raval commented: "It's a big game, big players step up and Tarun has been a big player for the Aces for the last four to five years and long may it continue". Nethula took 43 Plunket Shield wickets in 2016–17, one behind Stags left-arm spinner and former teammate Ajaz Patel.

Besides playing cricket, he has a career as sports director at Mount Roskill Grammar School, since May 2017. He graduated from Massey University with a degree in International Business.
