= Rob Nicol =

New Zealand cricketer (born 1983)

Personal information
- Full name: Robert James Nicol
- Born: 28 May 1983 (age 43); Auckland, New Zealand]
- Batting: Right-handed
- Bowling: Right-arm medium; Right-arm off break

International information
- National side: New Zealand
- Test debut (cap 254): 7 March 2012 v South Africa
- Last Test: 15 March 2012 v South Africa
- ODI debut (cap 166): 20 October 2011 v Zimbabwe
- Last ODI: 19 January 2013 v South Africa
- ODI shirt no.: 28
- T20I debut (cap 44): 22 May 2010 v Sri Lanka
- Last T20I: 26 December 2012 v South Africa
- T20I shirt no.: 28

Domestic team information
- Years: Team
- 2001/02–2008/09: Auckland
- 2009/10–2013/14: Canterbury
- 2011/12: Mashonaland Eagles
- 2012: Gloucestershire (squad no. 38)
- 2014/15–2016/17: Auckland
- 2017/18: Otago

Career statistics
Competition	Test	ODI	T20I	FC
Matches	2	22	21	130
Runs scored	28	586	327	6,319
Batting average	7.00	30.84	17.21	32.74
100s/50s	0/0	2/2	0/2	10/37
Top score	19	146	58	160
Balls bowled	17	339	123	4,487
Wickets	0	10	5	43
Bowling average	–	32.90	33.40	68.58
5 wickets in innings	–	0	0	0
10 wickets in match	–	0	0	0
Best bowling	–	4/19	2/20	4/53
Catches/stumpings	2/–	11/–	5/–	104/–
- Source: Cricinfo, 18 April 2023

Robert James Nicol (born 28 May 1983) is a former New Zealand cricketer, who played all formats of the game. He is a right-handed opening batsman and bowled right arm off spin occasionally. Domestically, Nicol has played first-class, List A and Twenty20 matches for Auckland and Canterbury, and was the captain for Auckland. In June 2018, Nicol announced his retirement from all forms of cricket.

== Domestic career ==
Rob Nicol started off playing for Auckland and played for the Aces for 8 seasons his best spell in 2002–03 where he scored over 600 runs. He then moved to Canterbury in 2009, scoring over 500 runs in his first season. His performances for the Wizards brought him to the notice of the New Zealand selectors, who selected him for the Twenty20 squad.

Previously played at Hitchin Cricket Club in Hertfordshire as the overseas player in 2009 and 2010 before joining up with the Kiwis in West Indies. Broke the Saracens Hertfordshire Division 1 total season runs and largest innings at 201 not out against Knebworth Park CC.

Nicol enjoyed a spell in English county cricket playing for Gloucestershire in July 2012 as a replacement for fellow countryman Kane Williamson as part of the deal Gloucestershire coach John Bracewell set up with the New Zealand Cricket Board where young Kiwi cricketers join Gloucs for experience.

== International career ==
He made his debut in one day internationals in 2011, but failed to secure regular selection past the 2012/2013 season. Selectors rewarded him with a place in the test team in the home series against South Africa, but he found runs difficult to come by and has only played 2 Tests to date. He was also played as the opening partner of Brendon McCullum during 2012 ICC World Twenty20 held in Sri Lanka.

Nicol had a wonderful ODI debut against Zimbabwe in 2011 at Harare. Chasing 232 to win, the New Zealand openers Nicol and Martin Guptill first sent the Black Caps to a flyer as they crossed 50 runs in just 6 overs. After that, he went on to score 108 not out, a brilliant century that included 11 fours. In the process, he became the seventh batsman ever and the second New Zealander (after his fellow opener in the match, Martin Guptill) to score a century on ODI debut. The previous batsmen to achieve this feat were Dennis Amiss, Desmond Haynes, Andy Flower, Saleem Elahi, Martin Guptill, and Colin Ingram.
