= Phil Jones (umpire) =

New Zealand cricket umpire

Personal information
- Born: 1 January 1960 (age 66); Henderson, New Zealand

Umpiring information
- ODIs umpired: 3 (2014–2015)
- T20Is umpired: 3 (2016)
- WODIs umpired: 6 (2004–2015)
- WT20Is umpired: 3 (2012–2015)
- Source: Cricinfo

Phil Jones (born 1 January 1960) is a New Zealand cricket umpire. He made his One Day International (ODI) umpiring debut on 8 November 2014 in a match between Hong Kong and Papua New Guinea in Australia. His Twenty20 International umpiring debut was on 7 January 2016 between New Zealand and Sri Lanka. He was a member of the International Panel of Umpires and Referees until June 2016, when he was demoted to New Zealand's national panel.

== See also ==
- List of One Day International cricket umpires
- List of Twenty20 International cricket umpires
