= Michael Pollard (cricketer) =

New Zealand cricketer (born 1989)

Personal information
- Full name: Michael Alan Pollard
- Born: 2 November 1989 (age 37); Wellington, New Zealand
- Batting: Right-handed

Domestic team information
- Years: Team
- 2009/10–2019/20: Wellington
- 2017/18: Canterbury

Career statistics
| Competition | FC | LA | T20 |
|---|---|---|---|
| Matches | 51 | 58 | 83 |
| Runs scored | 2,522 | 1,820 | 1,564 |
| Batting average | 28.65 | 33.09 | 20.85 |
| 100s/50s | 3/16 | 2/10 | 0/8 |
| Top score | 166 | 119 | 76 |
| Catches/stumpings | 47/– | 27/– | 39/– |
- Source: Cricinfo, 8 November 2024

Michael Alan Pollard (born 2 November 1989) is a New Zealand first-class cricketer who played for Wellington from 2009–10 to 2019–20, with one season for Canterbury in 2017–18.

A right-handed middle-order batsman who sometimes opened the batting in one-day cricket, Pollard made his highest first-class score of 166 for Wellington against Otago in the 2013–14 Plunket Shield, when he and James Franklin added 238 for the fourth wicket. His highest List A score was 119, out of Canterbury's all-out total of 231, against Northern Districts in the 2017–18 Ford Trophy.
