= Andrew Ellis (cricketer) =

New Zealand cricketer (born 1982)

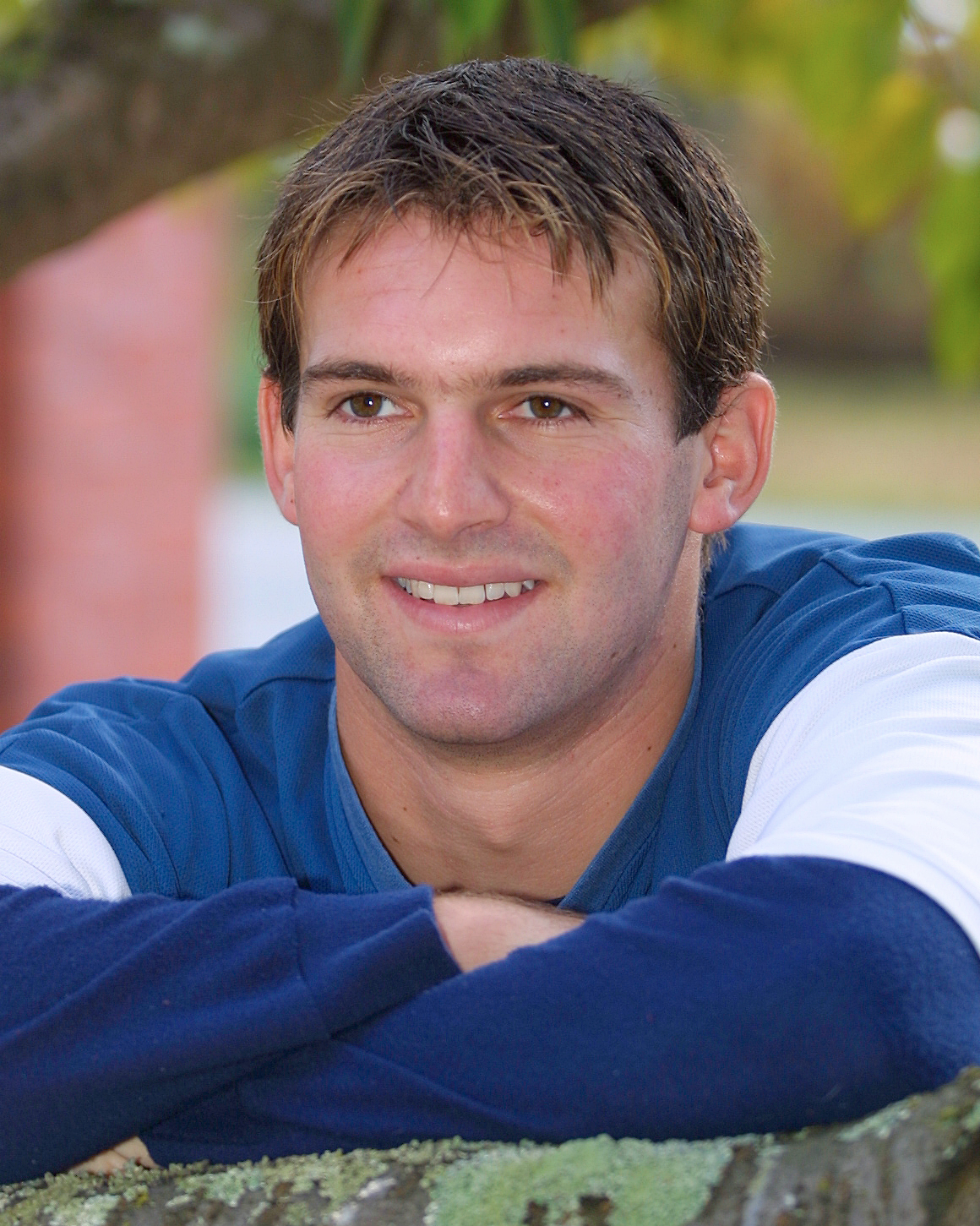
- Ellis in 2001

Personal information
- Full name: Andrew Malcolm Ellis
- Born: 24 March 1982 (age 44); Christchurch, New Zealand
- Batting: Right-handed
- Bowling: Right-arm medium-fast
- Role: Bowler

International information
- National side: New Zealand (2012–2013)
- ODI debut (cap 169): 3 February 2012 v Zimbabwe
- Last ODI: 12 November 2012 v Sri Lanka
- T20I debut (cap 54): 14 February 2012 v Zimbabwe
- Last T20I: 21 November 2013 v Sri Lanka

Domestic team information
- Years: Team
- Canterbury

Career statistics
Competition	ODI	T20I	FC	LA
Matches	15	5	106	133
Runs scored	154	25	5,221	2,708
Batting average	14.00	8.33	35.27	31.85
100s/50s	0/0	0/0	9/29	1/11
Top score	33	16	196	101
Balls bowled	480	60	16,604	4,596
Wickets	12	2	249	154
Bowling average	35.41	52.50	29.78	29.84
5 wickets in innings	0	0	6	2
10 wickets in match	0	0	0	0
Best bowling	2/22	2/40	6/35	5/17
Catches/stumpings	3/–	0/–	56/–	42/–
- Source: Cricinfo, 20 March 2020

Andrew Malcolm Ellis (born 24 March 1982) is a New Zealand former international cricketer, who played in One Day Internationals (ODIs) and Twenty20 Internationals (T20Is). In first-class cricket, Ellis played 26 State Championship games for Canterbury, up to the end of the 2006/7 season. Ellis retired from all forms of cricket in March 2020. He was the second New Zealand cricketer to play 100 or more matches in each format of the game.

== Domestic career ==
A right-handed batsman and right arm fast medium bowler, he made his debut in 2003 against Auckland. He has scored 910 first class runs at an average of 26.76, with a top score of 78 against Northern Districts. He has also taken 32 wickets at 43.68 with a best analysis of 5 for 63 against Otago.

In 11 List-A one-day matches he has scored 157 runs at 22.42 with a top score of 46 and taken 3 wickets at just over 40. He also played six Twenty20 games with moderate returns.

He played for New Zealand Under-19s in the 2000/01 season in 2 'Tests' against South Africa under-19s and appeared for Marylebone Cricket Club in 2004.

In November 2017, he scored his 5,000th run for Canterbury in first-class cricket in the 2017–18 Plunket Shield season. In June 2018, he was awarded a contract with Canterbury for the 2018–19 season.

In 2018, Ellis was involved in a bizarre incident when a shot off Northern Districts batsman Jeet Raval ricocheted off his head and crossed the boundary on the full, going for six runs.
