= Daniel Flynn (cricketer) =

New Zealand cricketer

Personal information
- Full name: Daniel Raymond Flynn
- Born: 16 April 1985 (age 41); Rotorua, Bay of Plenty, New Zealand
- Batting: Left-handed
- Bowling: Left-arm leg spin
- Role: Batsman

International information
- National side: New Zealand (2008–2013)
- Test debut (cap 238): 15 May 2008 v England
- Last Test: 11 January 2013 v South Africa
- ODI debut (cap 148): 23 February 2008 v England
- Last ODI: 16 July 2012 v West Indies
- T20I debut (cap 31): 7 February 2008 v England
- Last T20I: 1 July 2012 v West Indies

Domestic team information
- Years: Team
- 2004/05–2019/20: Northern Districts

Career statistics
Competition	Test	ODI	T20I	FC
Matches	24	20	5	135
Runs scored	1,038	228	59	7,815
Batting average	25.95	15.20	11.80	35.04
100s/50s	0/6	0/0	0/0	21/29
Top score	95	35	23	241
Balls bowled	6	24	6	283
Wickets	0	0	0	1
Bowling average	–	–	–	160.00
5 wickets in innings	–	–	–	0
10 wickets in match	–	–	–	0
Best bowling	–	–	–	1/37
Catches/stumpings	10/–	4/–	2/–	55/–
- Source: Cricinfo, 13 August 2020

Daniel Raymond Flynn (born 16 April 1985) is a New Zealand former cricketer who played for Northern Districts and has also represented the New Zealand international side. In April 2020, Flynn announced his retirement from cricket.

== Domestic career ==
He has captained the New Zealand Under-19 side in Youth ODIs. He was educated at Tauranga Boys' College and was in the 1st XI from 1999 to 2002, being captain in his last two years.

Daniel is a resident of Tauranga, which is in the Bay of Plenty, New Zealand. This falls into the catchment area of the Northern Districts Cricket Association. He has played two seasons at Barnards Green Cricket Club in Worcestershire, England. Daniel holds the league record for runs scored in the Worcestershire League with a highest score of 184. In March 2011 Flynn joined Dunfermline Knights, Scotland, to play for the 2011 season.

In June 2018, he was awarded a contract with Northern Districts for the 2018–19 season. In November 2019, during the 2019–20 Plunket Shield season, Flynn played in his 100th first-class match.

== International career ==
On 6 February 2008, Flynn took the place of the injured Jacob Oram for the second international Twenty20 against England, having impressed on 30 January, hitting 149 in a domestic match. New Zealand fell to a second defeat in the Twenty20 series, however, with Flynn surviving only two deliveries, making one run, before being dismissed by Graeme Swann. He then replaced an out-of-form Peter Fulton for the final One Day International on 23 February 2008. Flynn then accompanied the New Zealand team to England and, on 15 May 2008 made his test debut.

On 23 May, whilst batting at number 6 for New Zealand, against England, Flynn was hit in the grille by a rising ball from James Anderson. Flynn retired hurt and lost a tooth. It was also stated on TMS that more teeth were loosened and removed by a dentist later that day.
