= Pakistani cricket team in New Zealand in 2017–18 =

International cricket tour

	New Zealand	Pakistan
- Dates: 3 January – 28 January 2018
Captains	Kane Williamson (Note: Tim Southee replaced Kane Williamson as captain for New Zealand's first T20I.)	Sarfaraz Ahmed

One Day International series
- Results: New Zealand won the 5-match series 5–0
Most runs	Martin Guptill (310)	Fakhar Zaman (150)
Most wickets	Trent Boult (9)	Rumman Raees (8)
- Player of the series: Martin Guptill (NZ)

Twenty20 International series
- Results: Pakistan won the 3-match series 2–1
Most runs	Martin Guptill (87)	Babar Azam (109)
Most wickets	Mitchell Santner (4); Seth Rance (4)	Shadab Khan (5)
- Player of the series: Mohammad Amir (Pak)

The Pakistan cricket team toured New Zealand in January 2018 to play five One Day Internationals (ODIs) and three Twenty20 International (T20I) matches. New Zealand won the ODI series 5–0, their second ever 5-0 bilateral series win, the first being against the West Indies in 2000. Pakistan won the T20I series 2–1. It was Pakistan's first T20I series win in New Zealand and as a result, Pakistan moved to the top of the ICC T20I Championship rankings.

== Squads ==
ODIs		T20Is	
New Zealand	Pakistan	New Zealand	Pakistan
Kane Williamson (c); Todd Astle; Trent Boult; Doug Bracewell; Lockie Ferguson; Colin de Grandhomme; Martin Guptill; Matt Henry; Tom Latham (wk); Colin Munro; Henry Nicholls; Seth Rance; Mitchell Santner; Tim Southee (vc); Ross Taylor; George Worker	Sarfaraz Ahmed (c, wk); Azhar Ali; Hasan Ali; Umar Amin; Mohammad Amir; Faheem Ashraf; Babar Azam; Imam-ul-Haq; Mohammad Hafeez; Shadab Khan; Shoaib Malik; Mohammad Nawaz; Rumman Raees; Haris Sohail; Aamer Yamin; Fakhar Zaman	Kane Williamson (c); Tom Blundell; Trent Boult; Tom Bruce; Colin de Grandhomme; Lockie Ferguson; Martin Guptill; Anaru Kitchen; Colin Munro; Glenn Phillips (wk); Seth Rance; Mitchell Santner; Ish Sodhi; Tim Southee; Ross Taylor; Ben Wheeler	Sarfaraz Ahmed (c, wk); Hasan Ali; Umar Amin; Mohammad Amir; Faheem Ashraf; Babar Azam; Mohammad Hafeez; Shadab Khan; ~~Shoaib Malik~~; Mohammad Nawaz; Rumman Raees; Ahmed Shehzad; Haris Sohail; Aamer Yamin; Fakhar Zaman

Doug Bracewell was ruled out of New Zealand's squad for the first two ODIs with a hamstring strain and was replaced by George Worker. Worker was then replaced by Colin de Grandhomme in New Zealand's squad for the final three ODIs.

For the final ODI, Trent Boult was rested and replaced by Seth Rance in New Zealand's squad. For the T20I series, Trent Boult and Lockie Ferguson were selected only for the second and third T20I, Tim Southee was selected for first and third T20I and Ross Taylor was selected only for the first T20I. Pakistan's Shoaib Malik, injured during the 4th ODI, was replaced by Umar Amin for the final ODI. Tim Southee captained New Zealand for first T20I as Kane Williamson was ruled out due to an injury. Ross Taylor and Tom Blundell were added to New Zealand's squad for the last T20I as replacements for Colin Munro and Glenn Phillips, respectively.

== Tour match ==
=== One-day match: New Zealand XI vs Pakistan ===
3 January 2018
11:00
Scorecard

Pakistan; 341/9 (50 overs)	v	New Zealand XI; 221 (47.1 overs)
Fakhar Zaman 106 (84); Aniket Parikh 3/74 (10 overs)		Michael Davidson 54 (81); Shadab Khan 4/52 (9.1 overs)

Pakistani won by 120 runs
Saxton Oval, Nelson
Umpires: John Bromley (NZ) and John Dempsey (NZ)

- New Zealand XI won the toss and elected to field.
- Ben Beecroft, Lauchie Johns, Aniket Parikh and Michael Rae (New Zealand XI) all made their List A debuts.

== ODI series ==
=== 1st ODI ===
6 January 2018
11:00
Scorecard

New Zealand; 315/7 (50 overs)	v	Pakistan; 166/6 (30.1 overs)
Kane Williamson 115 (117); Hasan Ali 3/61 (10 overs)		Fakhar Zaman 82* (86); Tim Southee 3/22 (6.1 overs)

New Zealand won by 61 runs (DLS method)
Basin Reserve, Wellington
Umpires: Wayne Knights (NZ) and Ruchira Palliyaguruge (SL)
Player of the match: Kane Williamson (NZ)

- Pakistan won the toss and elected to field.
- Kane Williamson (NZ) scored his tenth century in ODIs.
- Williamson's century was only the third ODI century at this ground and the first since 1989.
- New Zealand's made the highest total at this ground in ODIs.

=== 2nd ODI ===
9 January 2018
11:00
Scorecard

Pakistan; 246/9 (50 overs)	v	New Zealand; 151/2 (23.5 overs)
Mohammad Hafeez 60 (71); Lockie Ferguson 3/39 (10 overs)		Martin Guptill 86* (71); Mohammad Amir 1/18 (5 overs)

New Zealand won by 8 wickets (DLS method)
Saxton Oval, Nelson
Umpires: Chris Brown (NZ) and Richard Illingworth (Eng)
Player of the match: Martin Guptill (NZ)

- Pakistan won the toss and elected to bat.
- New Zealand were set a revised target of 151 runs in 25 overs.
- Mohammad Hafeez became the tenth batsman for Pakistan to score 6,000 runs in ODIs.

=== 3rd ODI ===
13 January 2018
11:00

New Zealand; 257 (50 overs)	v	Pakistan; 74 (27.2 overs)
Kane Williamson 73 (101); Rumman Raees 3/51 (10 overs)		Rumman Raees 16* (48); Trent Boult 5/17 (7.2 overs)

New Zealand won by 183 runs
University Oval, Dunedin
Umpires: Wayne Knights (NZ) and Ruchira Palliyaguruge (SL)
Player of the match: Trent Boult (NZ)

- New Zealand won the toss and elected to bat.

=== 4th ODI ===
16 January 2018
14:00 (D/N)
Scorecard

Pakistan; 262/8 (50 overs)	v	New Zealand; 263/5 (45.5 overs)
Mohammad Hafeez 81 (80); Tim Southee 1/44 (8 overs)		Colin de Grandhomme 74* (40); Shadab Khan 3/42 (10 overs)

New Zealand won by 5 wickets
Seddon Park, Hamilton
Umpires: Richard Illingworth (Eng) and Wayne Knights (NZ)
Player of the match: Colin de Grandhomme (NZ)

- Pakistan won the toss and elected to bat.
- Ross Taylor (NZ) played in his 200th ODI.

=== 5th ODI ===
19 January 2018
11:00
Scorecard

New Zealand; 271/7 (50 overs)	v	Pakistan; 256 (49 overs)
Martin Guptill 100 (126); Rumman Raees 3/67 (10 overs)		Haris Sohail 63 (87); Matt Henry 4/53 (10 overs)

New Zealand won by 15 runs
Basin Reserve, Wellington
Umpires: Chris Brown (NZ) and Ruchira Palliyaguruge (SL)
Player of the match: Martin Guptill (NZ)

- New Zealand won the toss and elected to bat.
- Martin Guptill became the second New Zealand player and ninth overall to score a century against each of the other nine full member Test-playing nations.
- Ross Taylor made his 58th score of 50 or more, the most by a New Zealand player.

== T20I series ==
=== 1st T20I ===
22 January 2018
16:00 (D/N)
Scorecard

Pakistan; 105 (19.4 overs)	v	New Zealand; 106/3 (15.5 overs)
Babar Azam 41 (41); Tim Southee 3/13 (4 overs)		Colin Munro 49* (43); Rumman Raees 2/24 (4 overs)

New Zealand won by 7 wickets
Wellington Regional Stadium, Wellington
Umpires: Wayne Knights (NZ) and Chris Brown (NZ)
Player of the match: Colin Munro (NZ)

- New Zealand won the toss and elected to field.

=== 2nd T20I ===
25 January 2018
19:00 (N)
Scorecard

Pakistan; 201/4 (20 overs)	v	New Zealand; 153 (18.3 overs)
Babar Azam 50* (29); Ben Wheeler 2/36 (4 overs)		Mitchell Santner 37 (28); Faheem Ashraf 3/22 (3.3 overs)

Pakistan won by 48 runs
Eden Park, Auckland
Umpires: Chris Brown (NZ) and Shaun Haig (NZ)
Player of the match: Fakhar Zaman (Pak)

- Pakistan won the toss and elected to bat.
- This was Pakistan's first win against New Zealand since January 2016 in fourteen matches across all formats.

=== 3rd T20I ===
28 January 2018
19:00 (N)
Scorecard

Pakistan; 181/6 (20 overs)	v	New Zealand; 163/6 (20 overs)
Fakhar Zaman 46 (36); Mitchell Santner 2/24 (4 overs)		Martin Guptill 59 (43); Shadab Khan 2/19 (4 overs)

Pakistan won by 18 runs
Bay Oval, Mount Maunganui
Umpires: Shaun Haig (NZ) and Wayne Knights (NZ)
Player of the match: Shadab Khan (Pak)

- Pakistan won the toss and elected to bat.
