= 2018–19 Ford Trophy =

Cricket tournament

- Dates: 24 October – 1 December 2018
- Administrator: New Zealand Cricket
- Cricket format: List A cricket
- Tournament format(s): Round-robin and Knockout
- Champions: Wellington (8th title)
- Participants: 6
- Matches: 32
- Most runs: Andrew Fletcher (618)
- Most wickets: Hamish Bennett (28)
- Official website: www.blackcaps.co.nz

The 2018–19 Ford Trophy was the 48th season of The Ford Trophy, the List A cricket tournament in New Zealand. It was the eighth in a sponsorship deal between New Zealand Cricket and Ford Motor Company. Originally scheduled to take place between December 2018 and February 2019, it was brought forward, starting on 24 October and finished on 1 December 2018. Unlike the previous edition of the competition, the tournament featured ten rounds of matches, instead of eight. Auckland were the defending champions.

On 7 November 2018, in the fifth round fixture between Northern Districts and Central Districts, a new record in List A cricket was set for the most runs scored off one over, with 43. Northern Districts' batsmen Joe Carter and Brett Hampton scored the runs from the bowling of Willem Ludick. The over included two no-balls, six sixes, a four and a single.

Following the conclusion of the group stage, Otago finished top of the table, and progressed directly to the final of the tournament. Wellington and Auckland finished second and third respectively, progressing to the elimination final. In the elimination match, Wellington beat Auckland by three wickets, with James Neesham scoring 120 not out. In the final, Wellington beat Otago by three wickets to win their eighth title.

== Points table ==
Pos	Team	Pld	W	L	NR	BP	Pts	NRR
1	Otago	10	7	3	0	2	30	−0.173
2	Wellington	10	6	3	1	3	29	0.962
3	Auckland	10	5	5	0	1	21	−0.410
4	Northern Districts	10	4	4	2	0	20	−0.285
5	Central Districts	10	3	5	2	1	17	0.038
6	Canterbury	10	2	7	1	1	11	−0.107

Advances to Grand Final
Advance to Elimination Final

== Fixtures ==
=== Round 1 ===
24 October 2018
Scorecard

Northern Districts; 268 (45.3 overs)	v	Auckland; 271/8 (49.4 overs)
Brett Hampton 79* (52); Mitchell McClenaghan 3/57 (8 overs)		Sean Solia 133* (138); Trent Boult 3/61 (10 overs)

Auckland won by 2 wickets
Eden Park Outer Oval, Auckland
Umpires: Billy Bowden and Wayne Knights

- Auckland won the toss and elected to field.

24 October 2018
Scorecard

Central Districts; 269/7 (50 overs)	v	Otago; 232 (44.5 overs)
Ben Smith 93 (100); Nathan Smith 2/44 (6 overs)		Josh Finnie 63 (49); Ryan McCone 3/34 (7.5 overs)

Central Districts won by 37 runs
Saxton Oval, Nelson
Umpires: Chris Brown and Ashley Mehrotra

- Otago won the toss and elected to field.
- Willem Ludick, Ma'ara Ave, Felix Murray (Central Districts) and Mitch Renwick (Otago) all made their List A debuts.

24 October 2018
Scorecard

Canterbury; 286 (48.4 overs)	v	Wellington; 288/3 (47.1 overs)
Cole McConchie 90 (90); Ollie Newton 3/37 (9.4 overs)		Andrew Fletcher 132* (155); Andrew Ellis 1/43 (7 overs)

Wellington won by 7 wickets
Basin Reserve, Wellington
Umpires: Shaun Haig and Garth Stirrat

- Wellington won the toss and elected to bat.
- Andrew Fletcher, Jakob Bhula, Ben Sears (Wellington) and Theo van Woerkom (Canterbury) all made their List A debuts.
- Andrew Fletcher (Wellington) scored his first century in List A cricket.
- Lauchie Johns (Wellington) set a new List A record in New Zealand for the most catches in a match (7).

=== Round 2 ===
28 October 2018
Scorecard

Auckland; 276/9 (50 overs)	v	Wellington; 263 (47.1 overs)
Sean Solia 63 (84); Hamish Bennett 3/44 (10 overs)		Michael Bracewell 120 (127); Michael Barry 3/37 (7 overs)

Auckland won by 13 runs
Eden Park Outer Oval, Auckland
Umpires: Shaun Haig and Wayne Knights

- Wellington won the toss and elected to field.

28 October 2018
Scorecard

Central Districts; 163 (43.4 overs)	v	Canterbury; 166/5 (35.4 overs)
Christian Leopard 29 (32); Will Williams 4/34 (10 overs)		Tom Latham 73* (84); Doug Bracewell 2/25 (9 overs)

Canterbury won by 5 wickets
Pukekura Park, New Plymouth
Umpires: John Bromley and Tim Parlane

- Central Districts won the toss and elected to field.

28 October 2018
Scorecard

Northern Districts; 179 (44.4 overs)	v	Otago; 180/1 (37.4 overs)
Daryl Mitchell 76 (109); Jacob Duffy 4/29 (8.4 overs)		Hamish Rutherford 102* (125); Neil Wagner 1/39 (7 overs)

Otago won by 9 wickets
Seddon Park, Hamilton
Umpires: Chris Brown and Billy Bowden

- Otago won the toss and elected to field.

=== Round 3 ===
31 October 2018
Scorecard

Central Districts	v	Northern Districts

Match abandoned
Saxton Oval, Nelson
Umpires: Billy Bowden and Ashley Mehrotra

- No toss.
- No play was possible due to rain.

31 October 2018
Scorecard

Wellington; 301/6 (50 overs)	v	Otago; 108 (31 overs)
Andrew Fletcher 125 (150); Jacob Duffy 2/45 (10 overs)		Hamish Rutherford 44 (73); James Neesham 3/17 (7 overs)

Wellington won by 193 runs
Basin Reserve, Wellington
Umpires: Derek Walker and Tony Gillies

- Otago won the toss and elected to field.
- This was Wellington's biggest winning margin, by runs, in List A cricket.

31 October 2018
Scorecard

Canterbury; 243 (49.3 overs)	v	Auckland; 237/9 (50 overs)
Henry Nicholls 89 (111); Sean Solia 4/38 (9.3 overs)		Ben Horne 56 (58); Cole McConchie 3/41 (8 overs)

Canterbury won by 6 runs
Hagley Oval, Christchurch
Umpires: John Bromley and Tim Parlane

- Auckland won the toss and elected to field.
- Andrew Hazeldine (Canterbury) made his List A debut.

=== Round 4 ===
4 November 2018
Scorecard

Auckland; 270/5 (50 overs)	v	Canterbury; 267/7 (50 overs)
Craig Cachopa 106 (122); Will Williams 2/56 (10 overs)		Chad Bowes 96 (109); Danru Ferns 4/35 (10 overs)

Auckland won by 3 runs
Eden Park Outer Oval, Auckland
Umpires: Billy Bowden and John Dempsey

- Canterbury won the toss and elected to field.
- William O'Donnell (Auckland) made his List A debut.

4 November 2018
Scorecard

Otago; 208/7 (32 overs)	v	Central Districts; 194 (31.4 overs)
Neil Broom 68 (58); Willem Ludick 2/27 (6 overs)		Josh Clarkson 64 (50); Matthew Bacon 3/35 (6.4 overs)

Otago won by 16 runs (D/L method)
University Oval, Dunedin
Umpires: Shaun Haig and John Bromley

- Otago won the toss and elected to bat.
- Dean Foxcroft (Central Districts) made his List A debut.

4 November 2018
Scorecard

Wellington; 269 (50 overs)	v	Northern Districts; 230 (47.5 overs)
James Neesham 86 (67); Anton Devcich 5/46 (10 overs)		Peter Bocock 54* (46); Hamish Bennett 4/34 (7.5 overs)

Wellington won by 39 runs
Basin Reserve, Wellington
Umpires: Chris Brown and Tony Gillies

- Northern Districts won the toss and elected to field.

=== Round 5 ===
7 November 2018
Scorecard

Otago; 309/8 (50 overs)	v	Canterbury; 247 (47.4 overs)
Hamish Rutherford 154 (141); Henry Shipley 4/60 (10 overs)		Jack Boyle 71 (98); Matthew Bacon 3/47 (8.4 overs)

Otago won by 62 runs
University Oval, Dunedin
Umpires: Shaun Haig and John Bromley

- Otago won the toss and elected to bat.
- Blake Coburn (Canterbury) made his List A debut.

7 November 2018
Scorecard

Wellington; 278 ( overs)	v	Auckland; 158 (41.4 overs)
Devon Conway 94 (122); Sean Solia 3/37 (7 overs)		William Somerville 50 (60); Malcolm Nofal 3/28 (7 overs)

Wellington won by 120 runs
Basin Reserve, Wellington
Umpires: Derek Walker and Tim Parlane

- Wellington won the toss and elected to bat.

7 November 2018
Scorecard

Northern Districts; 313/7 (50 overs)	v	Central Districts; 288/9 (50 overs)
Joe Carter 102* (77); Doug Bracewell 3/64 (10 overs)		Dean Foxcroft 120* (105); Daryl Mitchell 3/51 (10 overs)

Northern Districts won by 25 runs
Seddon Park, Hamilton
Umpires: Chris Brown and Glen Walklin

- Central Districts won the toss and elected to field.
- Joe Carter (Northern Districts) scored his first century in List A cricket.

=== Round 6 ===
10 November 2018
Scorecard

Central Districts; 295/8 (50 overs)	v	Auckland; 125 (30.1 overs)
Dean Foxcroft 90 (98); Michael Barry 3/49 (7 overs)		Michael Barry 36 (58); Ben Wheeler 4/24 (7 overs)

Central Districts won by 170 runs
Eden Park Outer Oval, Auckland
Umpires: Chris Brown and Garth Stirrat

- Auckland won the toss and elected to field.
- R Majithia and Michael Snedden (Auckland) both made their List A debuts.

10 November 2018
Scorecard

Canterbury; 251/7 (50 overs)	v	Northern Districts; 254/7 (48.3 overs)
Jack Boyle 66 (91); Anton Devcich 3/55 (10 overs)		Nick Kelly 63 (78); Andrew Hazeldine 2/68 (10 overs)

Northern Districts won by 3 wickets
Seddon Park, Hamilton
Umpires: Tony Gillies and Ashley Mehrotra

- Canterbury won the toss and elected to bat.
- Jeff Case (Canterbury) made his List A debut.

10 November 2018
Scorecard

Otago; 218 (49.5 overs)	v	Wellington; 211 (46.2 overs)
Josh Finnie 53 (48); Ollie Newton 5/46 (8.5 overs)		James Neesham 100 (105); Jacob Duffy 5/38 (10 overs)

Otago won by 7 runs
University Oval, Dunedin
Umpires: Shaun Haig and Derek Walker

- Otago won the toss and elected to bat.

=== Round 7 ===
14 November 2018
Scorecard

Wellington; 266/8 (50 overs)	v	Central Districts; 208 (43.4 overs)
Andrew Fletcher 100 (123); Ben Wheeler 3/47 (10 overs)		Ben Wheeler 56 (49); Malcolm Nofal 3/36 (9.4 overs)

Wellington won by 58 runs
Lincoln No. 3, Lincoln
Umpires: Tony Gillies and Tim Parlane

- Wellington won the toss and elected to bat.

14 November 2018
Scorecard

Auckland; 250/9 (50 overs)	v	Otago; 251/7 (49 overs)
Craig Cachopa 84 (72); Michael Rippon 3/47 (10 overs)		Neil Broom 49 (58); Danru Ferns 2/40 (7 overs)

Otago won by 3 wickets
Bert Sutcliffe Oval, Lincoln
Umpires: Billy Bowden and Eugene Sanders

- Auckland won the toss and elected to bat.
- Teja Nidamanuru (Auckland) made his List A debut.

14 November 2018
Scorecard

Canterbury; 307/4 (50 overs)	v	Northern Districts; 311/6 (48.2 overs)
Jack Boyle 126 (146); Brett Randell 2/63 (10 overs)		Dean Brownlie 73 (83); Blake Coburn 2/55 (9 overs)

Northern Districts won by 4 wickets
Hagley Oval, Christchurch
Umpires: Derek Walker and Ashley Mehrotra

- Canterbury won the toss and elected to bat.

=== Round 8 ===
16 November 2018
Scorecard

Wellington; 256/7 (50 overs)	v	Canterbury; 233 (48.4 overs)
Andrew Fletcher 76 (104); Cole McConchie 3/28 (10 overs)		Stephen Murdoch 83 (98); Hamish Bennett 3/36 (9 overs)

Wellington won by 23 runs
Hagley Oval, Christchurch
Umpires: Billy Bowden and Damian Morrow

- Wellington won the toss and elected to bat.

16 November 2018
Scorecard

Central Districts; 226 (47.5 overs)	v	Auckland; 229/6 (45 overs)
Josh Clarkson 111 (107); Ben Lister 3/33 (10 overs); Matt McEwan 3/33 (10 overs)		Ben Horne 61 (68); Dean Foxcroft 3/39 (10 overs)

Auckland won by 4 wickets
Bert Sutcliffe Oval, Lincoln
Umpires: John Bromley and Tony Gillies

- Central Districts won the toss and elected to bat.

16 November 2018
Scorecard

Otago; 291/6 (50 overs)	v	Northern Districts; 292/3 (47.4 overs)
Michael Rippon 71* (64); Brett Randell 3/32 (9 overs)		Dean Brownlie 110 (115); Matthew Bacon 2/62 (8 overs)

Northern Districts won by 7 wickets
Lincoln No. 3, Lincoln
Umpires: Derek Walker and Ashley Mehrotra

- Northern Districts won the toss and elected to field.

=== Round 9 ===
18 November 2018
Scorecard

Canterbury; 270 (50 overs)	v	Otago; 271/6 (49.4 overs)
Chad Bowes 104 (117); Jacob Duffy 6/35 (10 overs)		Brad Wilson 126 (140); Blake Coburn 2/47 (10 overs)

Otago won by 4 wickets
Hagley Oval, Christchurch
Umpires: Tony Gillies and Ashley Mehrotra

- Canterbury won the toss and elected to bat.
- Ben Lockrose (Otago) made his List A debut.

18 November 2018
Scorecard

Central Districts; 279 (49.2 overs)	v	Wellington; 188 (39.4 overs)
Tom Bruce 87 (90); James Neesham 3/44 (10 overs)		Jakob Bhula 99 (122); Ben Wheeler 1/18 (8.4 overs)

Central Districts won by 7 runs (D/L method)
Bert Sutcliffe Oval, Lincoln
Umpires: Derek Walker and Tim Parlane

- Wellington won the toss and elected to field.

18 November 2018
Scorecard

Northern Districts; 275/8 (50 overs)	v	Auckland; 246/5 (36.1 overs)
Scott Kuggeleijn 75* (57); Ronnie Hira 3/62 (10 overs)		Colin Munro 143 (93); Joe Walker 2/46 (7 overs)

Auckland won by 58 runs (D/L method)
Lincoln No. 3, Lincoln
Umpires: Billy Bowden and John Bromley

- Auckland won the toss and elected to field.

=== Round 10 ===
24 November 2018
Scorecard

Central Districts	v	Canterbury

Match abandoned
Pukekura Park, New Plymouth
Umpires: Derek Walker and Tim Parlane

- No toss.
- No play was possible due to rain.

24 November 2018
Scorecard

Wellington; 20/2 (5.2 overs)	v	Northern Districts
Jakob Bhula 9 (17); Scott Kuggeleijn 2/14 (3 overs)

No result
Cobham Oval, Whangārei
Umpires: John Dempsey and Tony Gillies

- Northern Districts won the toss and elected to field.
- Rain prevented any further play.

24 November 2018
Scorecard

Otago; 283/7 (50 overs)	v	Auckland; 280/7 (50 overs)
Neil Broom 50 (64); Ronnie Hira 4/46 (10 overs)		Ben Horne 63 (78); Nathan Smith 2/44 (8 overs)

Otago won by 3 runs
Queens Park, Invercargill
Umpires: Shaun Haig and John Bromley

- Otago won the toss and elected to bat.

== Finals ==
Elimination Final			Grand Final
			1	Otago	234/8 (50 overs)
2	Wellington	237/7 (48.1 overs)	2	Wellington	235/7 (48.4 overs)
3	Auckland	236 (47.5 overs)

Elimination Final
28 November 2018
Scorecard

Auckland; 236 (47.5 overs)	v	Wellington; 237/7 (48.1 overs)
Graeme Beghin 69 (73); Ollie Newton 5/47 (10 overs)		James Neesham 120* (107); Ben Lister 3/51 (9 overs)

Wellington won by 3 wickets
Eden Park Outer Oval, Auckland
Umpires: Derek Walker and Tim Parlane

- Auckland won the toss and elected to bat.

Final
1 December 2018
Scorecard

Otago; 234/8 (50 overs)	v	Wellington; 235/7 (48.4 overs)
Christi Viljoen 87* (107); Hamish Bennett 4/46 (10 overs)		Malcolm Nofal 73 (96); Jacob Duffy 3/50 (10 overs)

Wellington won by 3 wickets
University Oval, Dunedin
Umpires: Chris Brown and Billy Bowden

- Otago won the toss and elected to bat.
