= Bangladeshi cricket team in New Zealand in 2018–19 =

International cricket tour

	New Zealand	Bangladesh
- Dates: 10 February – 20 March 2019
Captains	Kane Williamson (Note: Tom Latham captained New Zealand for the third ODI.)	Mahmudullah (Tests); Mashrafe Mortaza (ODIs)

Test series
- Result: New Zealand won the 3-match series 2–0
Most runs	Kane Williamson (274)	Tamim Iqbal (278)
Most wickets	Neil Wagner (16)	Abu Jayed (3)

One Day International series
- Results: New Zealand won the 3-match series 3–0
Most runs	Martin Guptill (264)	Sabbir Rahman (158)
Most wickets	Tim Southee (6); Trent Boult (6)	Mustafizur Rahman (4)
- Player of the series: Martin Guptill (NZ)

The Bangladesh cricket team toured New Zealand in February and March 2019 to play three Tests and three One Day Internationals (ODIs). The ODI fixtures were part of both teams' preparation for the 2019 Cricket World Cup. The tour ended early, with the cancellation of the third and final Test match, following the Christchurch mosque shootings.

The tour started two day after the conclusion of the 2018–19 Bangladesh Premier League, with Bangladesh's coach Steve Rhodes saying that it is "far from ideal preparation". Conversely, Bangladesh's wicket-keeper batsman Mushfiqur Rahim said it would be ideal preparation ahead of the World Cup, with New Zealand having conditions similar to those in England.

New Zealand won the ODI series 3–0, their fourth-consecutive whitewash in a bilateral ODI series at home against Bangladesh. Ross Taylor became New Zealand's leading run-scorer in One Day International cricket, after he surpassed Stephen Fleming's career total in the third ODI.

Ahead of the tour to New Zealand, Bangladesh's Test captain Shakib Al Hasan suffered a hand injury. Mahmudullah was named as the captain of Bangladesh's team for the first and second Tests. Shakib was eventually ruled out of the third Test. Kane Williamson was ruled out of New Zealand's squad for the third and final Test, with Tim Southee named as captain in his place.

However, the third Test was called off a day before the scheduled start of the match of 15 March 2019, due to the Christchurch mosque shootings. The Bangladesh team were on their way to one of the mosques in Christchurch for Friday prayers, but the team were able to escape to Hagley Oval. The Bangladesh Cricket Board (BCB) later confirmed that the team was safe and back at their hotel. New Zealand had won the first two Test matches to win the series 2–0.

== Squads ==
Tests		ODIs	
New Zealand	Bangladesh	New Zealand	Bangladesh
Kane Williamson (c); Todd Astle; Tom Blundell; Trent Boult; Colin de Grandhomme; Matt Henry; Tom Latham; Henry Nicholls; Jeet Raval; Tim Southee; Ross Taylor; Neil Wagner; BJ Watling (wk); Will Young	Mahmudullah (c); ~~Shakib Al Hasan (c)~~; Khaled Ahmed; ~~Taskin Ahmed~~; Litton Das (wk); Mominul Haque; Mehedi Hasan; Nayeem Hasan; Ebadot Hossain; Tamim Iqbal; Shadman Islam; Taijul Islam; Abu Jayed; Mohammad Mithun; Mushfiqur Rahim (wk); Mustafizur Rahman; Soumya Sarkar	Kane Williamson (c); Todd Astle; Trent Boult; Colin de Grandhomme; Lockie Ferguson; Martin Guptill; Matt Henry; Tom Latham (wk); Colin Munro; James Neesham; Henry Nicholls; Mitchell Santner; Tim Southee; Ross Taylor; Will Young	Mashrafe Mortaza (c); ~~Shakib Al Hasan (vc)~~; ~~Taskin Ahmed~~; Litton Das (wk); Mehedi Hasan; Nayeem Hasan; Rubel Hossain; Tamim Iqbal; Shafiul Islam; Mahmudullah; Mohammad Mithun (wk); Mushfiqur Rahim (wk); Mustafizur Rahman; Sabbir Rahman; Mohammad Saifuddin; Soumya Sarkar

Ahead of the tour, Taskin Ahmed was ruled out of Bangladesh's squad due to injury. Shafiul Islam and Ebadot Hossain replaced him in Bangladesh's ODI and Test squads respectively. Shakib Al Hasan was ruled out of Bangladesh's ODI squad, after fracturing a finger in the final of the 2018–19 Bangladesh Premier League. Kane Williamson was selected for the first two ODIs in New Zealand's squad, with Colin Munro replacing him in the team for the third ODI, and Tom Latham leading the squad.

After the conclusion of the third ODI, Soumya Sarkar was added to Bangladesh's Test squad as cover for Shakib Al Hasan. Ahead of the third Test, Tom Blundell was added to New Zealand's squad, as cover for BJ Watling. Kane Williamson was ruled out of New Zealand's squad for the third Test, with Will Young added to the squad as his replacement.

== Tour matches ==
=== 50 over match: New Zealand XI vs Bangladesh ===
10 February 2019
11:00
Scorecard

Bangladesh; 247 (46.1 overs)	v	New Zealand XI; 251/8 (48.1 overs)
Mahmudullah 72 (88); Iain McPeake 4/38 (8.1 overs)		Andrew Fletcher 92 (112); Mustafizur Rahman 2/33 (9 overs)

New Zealand XI won by 2 wickets
Bert Sutcliffe Oval, Lincoln
Umpires: John Bromley (NZ) and Eugene Sanders (NZ)

- New Zealand XI won the toss and elected to field.

=== Two-day match: New Zealand XI vs Bangladesh ===
23–24 February 2019
Scorecard

Bangladesh	v	New Zealand XI
411 (96.1 overs); Shadman Islam 67 (113); Blake Coburn 2/92 (25.1 overs)		57/2 (12 overs); Andrew Fletcher 43 (32); Ebadot Hossain 1/4 (1 over)

Match drawn
Bert Sutcliffe Oval, Lincoln
Umpires: Tony Gillies (NZ) and Derek Walker (NZ)

- Bangladesh won the toss and elected to bat.
- Only 12 overs of play were possible on day 2 due to rain.

== ODI series ==
=== 1st ODI ===
13 February 2019
14:00 (D/N)
Scorecard

Bangladesh; 232 (48.5 overs)	v	New Zealand; 233/2 (44.3 overs)
Mohammad Mithun 62 (90); Trent Boult 3/40 (9.5 overs)		Martin Guptill 117* (116); Mahmudullah 1/27 (5 overs)

New Zealand won by 8 wickets
McLean Park, Napier
Umpires: Chris Brown (NZ) and Sundaram Ravi (Ind)
Player of the match: Martin Guptill (NZ)

- Bangladesh won the toss and elected to bat.
- Mashrafe Mortaza played his 100th international cricket match as captain of Bangladesh.
- Martin Guptill (NZ) scored his fifteenth century in ODIs.

=== 2nd ODI ===
16 February 2019
11:00
Scorecard

Bangladesh; 226 (49.4 overs)	v	New Zealand; 229/2 (36.1 overs)
Mohammad Mithun 57 (69); Lockie Ferguson 3/43 (10 overs)		Martin Guptill 118 (88); Mustafizur Rahman 2/42 (9 overs)

New Zealand won by 8 wickets
Hagley Oval, Christchurch
Umpires: Marais Erasmus (SA) and Shaun Haig (NZ)
Player of the match: Martin Guptill (NZ)

- New Zealand won the toss and elected to field.
- Mushfiqur Rahim became the second cricketer for Bangladesh to appear in 200 ODIs.

=== 3rd ODI ===
20 February 2019
11:00
Scorecard

New Zealand; 330/6 (50 overs)	v	Bangladesh; 242 (47.2 overs)
Ross Taylor 69 (82); Mustafizur Rahman 2/93 (10 overs)		Sabbir Rahman 102 (110); Tim Southee 6/65 (9.2 overs)

New Zealand won by 88 runs
University Oval, Dunedin
Umpires: Wayne Knights (NZ) and Sundaram Ravi (Ind)
Player of the match: Tim Southee (NZ)

- Bangladesh won the toss and elected to field.
- Ross Taylor scored his 8,000th run in ODIs, and became the leading run-scorer for New Zealand in ODIs.
- Sabbir Rahman (Ban) scored his first century in ODIs.

== Test series ==
=== 1st Test ===
28 February–4 March 2019 (Note: While five days of play were scheduled for each Test, the first Test reached a result in four days.)
Scorecard

Bangladesh	v	New Zealand
234 (59.2 overs); Tamim Iqbal 126 (128); Neil Wagner 5/47 (16.2 overs)		715/6d (163 overs); Kane Williamson 200* (257); Soumya Sarkar 2/68 (21 overs)
429 (103 overs); Soumya Sarkar 149 (171); Trent Boult 5/123 (28 overs)

New Zealand won by an innings and 52 runs
Seddon Park, Hamilton
Umpires: Nigel Llong (Eng) and Paul Reiffel (Aus)
Player of the match: Kane Williamson (NZ)

- New Zealand won the toss and elected to field.
- Ebadot Hossain (Ban) made his Test debut.
- Jeet Raval (NZ) scored his first century in Tests.
- Kane Williamson became the first batsman for New Zealand to score twenty centuries in Tests.
- Kane Williamson also became the fastest batsman for New Zealand, in terms of innings, to score 6,000 runs in Tests (126).
- New Zealand made their highest total in an innings in Tests.
- Soumya Sarkar (Ban) scored his first century in Tests.
- BJ Watling took his 202nd dismissal, the most for a New Zealand wicket-keeper in Tests, surpassing Adam Parore's record of 201.

=== 2nd Test ===
8–12 March 2019
Scorecard

Bangladesh	v	New Zealand
211 (61 overs); Tamim Iqbal 74 (114); Neil Wagner 4/28 (13 overs)		432/6d (84.5 overs); Ross Taylor 200 (212); Abu Jayed 3/94 (18.5 overs)
209 (56 overs); Mahmudullah 67 (69); Neil Wagner 5/45 (14 overs)

New Zealand won by an innings and 12 runs
Basin Reserve, Wellington
Umpires: Ruchira Palliyaguruge (SL) and Paul Reiffel (Aus)
Player of the match: Ross Taylor (NZ)

- New Zealand won the toss and elected to field.
- No play was possible on days 1 and 2 due to rain.

=== 3rd Test ===
16–20 March 2019
Scorecard

New Zealand	v	Bangladesh

Match cancelled
Hagley Oval, Christchurch
Umpires: Nigel Llong (Eng) and Ruchira Palliyaguruge (SL)

- The match was called off on 15 March in the aftermath of the Christchurch mosque shootings.
