= 2018–19 Super Smash (men's cricket) =

Cricket tournament

2018–19 Men's Super Smash
- Dates: 22 December 2018 – 17 February 2019
- Administrator(s): New Zealand Cricket
- Cricket format: Twenty20 cricket
- Tournament format(s): Round-robin and knockout
- Champions: Central Stags (3rd title)
- Participants: 6
- Matches: 32
- Most runs: Devon Conway (363)
- Most wickets: Kyle Jamieson (22)
- Official website: Super Smash

The 2018–19 Burger King Super Smash (named after the competition's sponsor Burger King) was the fourteenth season of the Men's Super Smash Twenty20 cricket tournament in New Zealand. It took place from 22 December 2018 to 17 February 2019. Northern Knights were the defending champions.

On 1 January 2019, in the match between Auckland Aces and Canterbury Kings, Canterbury's Kyle Jamieson took the best figures by a bowler in a T20 match in New Zealand, and the third-best figures ever, when he took six wickets for seven runs from his four overs.

On 25 January 2019, Northern Knights were the first team to reach the final of the tournament, after they beat Central Stags by 131 runs, securing a home final in the process. On 2 February 2019, the Auckland Aces beat the Northern Knights by six wickets to confirm their spot in the playoffs. The Central Stags became the third and final team to reach the playoffs. In the Preliminary Final, Central Stags beat Auckland Aces by 44 runs to progress to the final.

In the final, Central Stags beat the defending champions, Northern Knights, by 67 runs to win their third title.

== Round-robin ==
=== Points table ===
Pos	Team	Pld	W	L	T	NR	Pts	NRR
1	Northern Knights	10	7	3	0	0	28	1.036
2	Auckland Aces	10	6	2	0	2	28	0.571
3	Central Stags	10	5	4	0	1	22	−0.638
4	Otago Volts	10	3	5	0	2	16	−0.637
5	Wellington Firebirds	10	3	6	0	1	14	−0.019
6	Canterbury Kings	10	3	7	0	0	12	−0.412

Advanced to the Final Advanced to the Preliminary Final

=== Fixtures ===
22 December 2018
Scorecard

Northern Knights; 215/6 (20 overs)	v	Wellington Firebirds; 170 (18.1 overs)
Dean Brownlie 99 (46); Jeetan Patel 2/39 (4 overs)		Devon Conway 45 (23); Anton Devcich 4/27 (4 overs)

Northern Districts won by 45 runs
Seddon Park, Hamilton
Umpires: Billy Bowden and Wayne Knights

- Wellington won the toss and elected to field.

23 December 2018
Scorecard

Canterbury Kings; 184/5 (20 overs)	v	Otago Volts; 188/5 (19.3 overs)
Stephen Murdoch 54 (33); Christi Viljoen 2/13 (2 overs)		Hamish Rutherford 54 (29); Kyle Jamieson 2/40 (4 overs)

Otago won by 5 wickets
University Oval, Dunedin
Umpires: Shaun Haig and Derek Walker

- Canterbury won the toss and elected to bat.
- Henry Shipley (Canterbury) and Mitch Renwick (Otago) both made their T20 debuts.

24 December 2018
Scorecard

Auckland Aces	v	Wellington Firebirds

Match abandoned
Eden Park Outer Oval, Auckland
Umpires: Chris Brown and Tony Gillies

- No toss.
- No play was possible due to rain.

27 December 2018
Scorecard

Northern Knights; 156/8 (20 overs)	v	Central Stags; 157/5 (19.2 overs)
Tim Seifert 55 (42); Blair Tickner 3/32 (4 overs)		Tom Bruce 88* (52); Scott Kuggeleijn 2/24 (4 overs)

Central Districts won by 5 wickets
Bay Oval, Mount Maunganui
Umpires: Billy Bowden and Chris Brown

- Central Districts won the toss and elected to field.
- Felix Murray (Central Districts) made his T20 debut.

28 December 2018
Scorecard

Otago Volts; 167/7 (20 overs)	v	Wellington Firebirds; 166/9 (20 overs)
Anaru Kitchen 52 (34); James Neesham 4/24 (4 overs)		Michael Bracewell 60 (29); Christi Viljoen 4/23 (4 overs)

Otago won by 1 run
Basin Reserve, Wellington
Umpires: John Bromley and Ashley Mehrotra

- Otago won the toss and elected to bat.

29 December 2018
Scorecard

Central Stags; 107 (17.1 overs)	v	Auckland Aces; 111/5 (16.4 overs)
Will Young 26 (22); William Somerville 3/28 (4 overs)		Martin Guptill 71* (51); Ben Wheeler 2/12 (4 overs)

Auckland won by 5 wickets
Pukekura Park, New Plymouth
Umpires: Chris Brown and Shaun Haig

- Auckland won the toss and elected to field.

30 December 2018
Scorecard

Otago Volts; 99/7 (20 overs)	v	Northern Knights; 101/5 (17.4 overs)
Anaru Kitchen 31 (41); Scott Kuggeleijn 2/11 (4 overs)		Dean Brownlie 34* (32); Jacob Duffy 3/18 (4 overs)

Northern Districts won by 5 wickets
Molyneux Park, Alexandra
Umpires: Eugene Sanders and Derek Walker

- Otago won the toss and elected to bat.

31 December 2018
Scorecard

Central Stags; 136/9 (20 overs)	v	Wellington Firebirds; 140/2 (15.4 overs)
Josh Clarkson 31 (19); Hamish Bennett 3/22 (4 overs)		Michael Bracewell 74 (42); Seth Rance 1/22 (3 overs)

Wellington won by 8 wickets
Pukekura Park, New Plymouth
Umpires: Chris Brown and Shaun Haig

- Wellington won the toss and elected to field.
- Willem Ludick, Dean Foxcroft (Central Districts) and Ben Sears (Wellington) all made their T20 debuts.

1 January 2019
Scorecard

Auckland Aces; 110 (19 overs)	v	Canterbury Kings; 111/5 (17.4 overs)
William Somerville 27 (18); Kyle Jamieson 6/7 (4 overs)		Cole McConchie 47* (42); Mitchell McClenaghan 3/26 (4 overs)

Canterbury won by 5 wickets
Eden Park Outer Oval, Auckland
Umpires: Billy Bowden and Wayne Knights

- Canterbury won the toss and elected to field.

6 January 2019
Scorecard

Northern Knights; 155/9 (20 overs)	v	Auckland Aces; 153/9 (20 overs)
Daryl Mitchell 78 (51); Mitchell McClenaghan 3/23 (3 overs)		Craig Cachopa 39 (17); Scott Kuggeleijn 4/18 (4 overs)

Northern Districts won by 2 runs
Seddon Park, Hamilton
Umpires: Billy Bowden and John Bromley

- Northern Districts won the toss and elected to bat.

6 January 2019
Scorecard

Central Stags	v	Otago Volts

Match abandoned
University Oval, Dunedin
Umpires: Damian Morrow and Ashley Mehrotra

- No toss.
- No play was possible due to rain.

6 January 2019
Scorecard

Wellington Firebirds; 200/5 (20 overs)	v	Canterbury Kings; 135 (18.2 overs)
Michael Bracewell 69 (34); Jeremy Benton 1/26 (3 overs)		Cole McConchie 83 (52); Ben Sears 4/16 (4 overs)

Wellington won by 65 runs
Basin Reserve, Wellington
Umpires: Wayne Knights and Tony Gillies

- Canterbury won the toss and elected to field.

9 January 2019
Scorecard

Canterbury Kings; 193/5 (20 overs)	v	Northern Knights; 197/8 (19.4 overs)
Chad Bowes 67 (46); Chris Jordan 2/36 (4 overs)		Brett Hampton 55 (41); Andrew Ellis 3/35 (4 overs)

Northern Districts won by 2 wickets
Hagley Oval, Christchurch
Umpires: Derek Walker and Garth Stirrat

- Northern Districts won the toss and elected to field.

10 January 2019
Scorecard

Central Stags; 208/7 (20 overs)	v	Otago Volts; 154/8 (20 overs)
Dean Foxcroft 56 (41); Nathan Smith 3/30 (4 overs)		Brad Wilson 32* (21); Ben Wheeler 4/26 (4 overs)

Central Districts won by 54 runs
McLean Park, Napier
Umpires: Billy Bowden and Tony Gillies

- Otago won the toss and elected to field.

12 January 2019
Scorecard

Northern Knights; 157/7 (20 overs)	v	Wellington Firebirds; 145/6 (20 overs)
Daryl Mitchell 49 (41); Ollie Newton 3/26 (4 overs)		Adam Hose 52 (44); Kyle Abbott 2/19 (4 overs); Daryl Mitchell 2/19 (4 overs)

Northern Districts won by 12 runs
Basin Reserve, Wellington
Umpires: Billy Bowden and John Bromley

- Northern Districts won the toss and elected to bat.
- Troy Johnson (Wellington) made his T20 debut.

13 January 2019
Scorecard

Auckland Aces; 117/1 (11 overs)	v	Otago Volts
Martin Guptill 62* (37); Jacob Duffy 1/11 (2 overs)

No result
University Oval, Dunedin
Umpires: Shaun Haig and John Dempsey

- Rain durting Auckland's innings prevented any further play.

13 January 2019
Scorecard

Canterbury Kings; 112/8 (20 overs)	v	Central Stags; 113/4 (16.5 overs)
Todd Astle 25 (27); Blair Tickner 3/15 (4 overs)		Tom Bruce 45* (31); Kyle Jamieson 2/20 (4 overs)

Central Districts won by 6 wickets
Hagley Oval, Christchurch
Umpires: Chris Brown and Derek Walker

- Central Districts won the toss and elected to field.

16 January 2019
Scorecard

Northern Knights; 154/5 (16 overs)	v	Canterbury Kings; 146/6 (16 overs)
Nick Kelly 56 (35); Matt Henry 2/29 (4 overs)		Henry Nicholls 40 (25); Corey Anderson 2/31 (3 overs)

Northern Districts won by 6 runs (D/L method)
Seddon Park, Hamilton
Umpires: Wayne Knights and Ashley Mehrotra

- Canterbury won the toss and elected to field.
- Canterbury were set a revised target of 153 runs from 16 overs due to rain.

18 January 2019
Scorecard

Wellington Firebirds; 122 (18.2 overs)	v	Auckland Aces; 123/4 (17.4 overs)
Adam Hose 38 (35); Colin Munro 4/15 (4 overs)		Mark Chapman 47* (41); Ollie Newton 2/20 (4 overs)

Auckland won by 6 wickets
Basin Reserve, Wellington
Umpires: John Bromley and Tony Gillies

- Wellington won the toss and elected to bat.

19 January 2019
Scorecard

Central Stags; 225/3 (20 overs)	v	Canterbury Kings; 207/4 (20 overs)
Will Young 89* (50); Matt Henry 2/37 (4 overs)		Tom Latham 110 (60); Ajaz Patel 5/53 (4 overs)

Central Districts won by 18 runs
McLean Park, Napier
Umpires: Shaun Haig and Ashley Mehrotra

- Central Districts won the toss and elected to bat.

20 January 2019
Scorecard

Auckland Aces; 184/5 (20 overs)	v	Otago Volts; 180/8 (20 overs)
Craig Cachopa 73 (38); Christi Viljoen 2/36 (4 overs)		Hamish Rutherford 37 (31); Matt Quinn 2/33 (4 overs); Mitchell McClenaghan 2/33 (4 overs)

Auckland won by 4 runs
Eden Park Outer Oval, Auckland
Umpires: Chris Brown and Wayne Knights

- Otago won the toss and elected to field.
- Josh Tasman-Jones (Otago) made his T20 debut.

25 January 2019
Scorecard

Northern Knights; 230/5 (20 overs)	v	Central Stags; 99 (14.1 overs)
Brett Hampton 64 (31); Blair Tickner 2/37 (4 overs)		Josh Clarkson 23 (19); Tarun Nethula 6/23 (3.1 overs)

Northern Districts won by 131 runs
McLean Park, Napier
Umpires: Billy Bowden and Shaun Haig

- Central Districts won the toss and elected to field.

26 January 2019
Scorecard

Canterbury Kings; 122/8 (20 overs)	v	Auckland Aces; 126/1 (17.1 overs)
Cam Fletcher 43 (43); Matt Quinn 4/20 (4 overs)		Glenn Phillips 56 (46); Kyle Jamieson 1/24 (4 overs)

Auckland won by 9 wickets
Hagley Oval, Christchurch
Umpires: Damian Morrow and Ashley Mehrotra

- Canterbury won the toss and elected to bat.
- Tom MacRury (Canterbury) made his T20 debut.

27 January 2019
Scorecard

Wellington Firebirds; 221/3 (20 overs)	v	Otago Volts; 210/8 (20 overs)
Devon Conway 105* (60); Nathan Smith 1/43 (4 overs)		Neil Broom 65 (34); Rachin Ravindra 3/32 (4 overs)

Wellington won by 11 runs
University Oval, Dunedin
Umpires: Derek Walker and John Bromley

- Wellington won the toss and elected to bat.

1 February 2019
Scorecard

Central Stags; 161/7 (20 overs)	v	Wellington Firebirds; 150 (19.4 oers)
Dean Foxcroft 51 (42); Logan van Beek 2/19 (4 overs)		Luke Woodcock 63 (49); Blair Tickner 3/25 (4 overs)

Central Districts won by 11 runs
Basin Reserve, Wellington
Umpires: Shaun Haig and Eugene Sanders

- Central Districts won the toss and elected to bat.
- Bayley Wiggins (Central Districts) made his T20 debut.

2 February 2019
Scorecard

Canterbury Kings; 172/4 (20 overs)	v	Otago Volts; 142 (19.2 overs)
Stephen Murdoch 64 (38); Michael Rippon 1/20 (4 overs)		Ben Cox 49 (40); Kyle Jamieson 4/23 (3.2 overs)

Canterbury won by 30 runs
Hagley Oval, Christchurch
Umpires: Derek Walker and Garth Stirrat

- Otago won the toss and elected to field.

2 February 2019
Scorecard

Northern Knights; 196/8 (20 overs)	v	Auckland Aces; 197/4 (19.2 overs)
Nick Kelly 37 (23); Colin Munro 2/28 (2 overs)		Craig Cachopa 60 (39); Neil Wagner 1/20 (3 overs)

Auckland won by 6 wickets
Eden Park Outer Oval, Auckland
Umpires: Billy Bowden and John Dempsey

- Auckland won the toss and elected to field.

9 February 2019
Scorecard

Wellington Firebirds; 132/8 (20 overs)	v	Canterbury Kings; 137/3 (17 overs)
Malcolm Nofal 28 (29); Kyle Jamieson 3/22 (4 overs)		Chad Bowes 72 (43); Luke Woodcock 1/12 (2 overs)

Canterbury won by 7 wickets
Hagley Oval, Christchurch
Umpires: Derek Walker and John Bromley

- Wellington won the toss and elected to bat.
- Lauchie Johns (Wellington) made his T20 debut.

9 February 2019
Scorecard

Central Stags; 174/9 (20 overs)	v	Auckland Aces; 176/2 (17.1 overs)
George Worker 52 (43); Ronnie Hira 3/22 (3 overs)		Mark Chapman 75* (41); Adam Milne 2/35 (4 overs)

Auckland won by 8 wickets
Eden Park Outer Oval, Auckland
Umpires: John Dempsey and Ashley Mehrotra

- Central Districts won the toss and elected to bat.

9 February 2019
Scorecard

Northern Knights; 150/9 (20 overs)	v	Otago Volts; 151/5 (18.5 overs)
Corey Anderson 42 (29); Christi Viljoen 3/39 (4 overs)		Hamish Rutherford 49 (34); Brett Hampton 2/31 (3.5 overs)

Otago won by 5 wickets
Bay Oval, Mount Maunganui
Umpires: Billy Bowden and Tim Parlane

- Northern Districts won the toss and elected to bat.

== Finals ==
Preliminary Final
15 February 2019
Scorecard

Central Stags; 219/4 (20 overs)	v	Auckland Aces; 175/5 (20 overs)
Will Young 83 (54); Mitchell McClenaghan 2/33 (4 overs)		Daniel Bell-Drummond 64 (43); Seth Rance 2/31 (4 overs)

Central Districts won by 44 runs
Eden Park Outer Oval, Auckland
Umpires: Chris Brown and Billy Bowden

- Auckland won the toss and elected to field.

Final
17 February 2019
Scorecard

Central Stags; 147/8 (20 overs)	v	Northern Knights; 80 (14.4 overs)
Dean Foxcroft 63 (50); Mitchell Santner 2/23 (3 overs)		Tim Seifert 18 (16); Adam Milne 3/12 (2.4 overs)

Central Districts won by 67 runs
Seddon Park, Hamilton
Umpires: Chris Brown and Wayne Knights

- Central Districts won the toss and elected to bat.
