= 2017–18 Ford Trophy =

Cricket tournament

- Dates: 3 December 2017 – 24 February 2018
- Administrator: New Zealand Cricket
- Cricket format: List A cricket
- Tournament format(s): Round-robin and Knockout
- Champions: Auckland (11th title)
- Participants: 6
- Matches: 28
- Most runs: Mark Chapman (480)
- Most wickets: Tarun Nethula (21)
- Official website: www.blackcaps.co.nz

The 2017–18 Ford Trophy was the 47th season of the official List A cricket tournament in New Zealand, and the seventh in a sponsorship deal between New Zealand Cricket and Ford Motor Company. The competition ran from 3 December 2017 to 24 February 2018. Canterbury were the defending champions.

The final round of fixtures were all abandoned due to rain. As a result, Central Districts topped the table and were joined in the final stage with Auckland, Northern Districts and Canterbury. After the preliminary final matches, Central Districts and Auckland had progressed to the tournament final.

Auckland won the tournament, beating Central Districts by six wickets in the final.

== Points table ==
Pos	Team	Pld	W	L	NR	BP	Pts	NRR
1	Central Districts	8	6	1	1	3	29	1.023
2	Auckland	8	4	3	1	2	20	0.198
3	Northern Districts	8	4	2	2	0	20	−0.117
4	Canterbury	8	2	4	2	0	12	−0.109
5	Wellington	8	2	5	1	0	10	−0.288
6	Otago	8	2	5	1	0	10	−0.736

Teams qualified for the finals

== Fixtures ==
=== Round 1 ===
3 December 2017
Scorecard

Wellington; 263/8 (50 overs)	v	Northern Districts; 267/5 (49.5 overs)
Stephen Murdoch 42 (55); Tim Southee 3/50 (10 overs)		BJ Watling 115 (132); Matt Taylor 2/16 (3 overs)

Northern Districts won by 5 wickets
Cobham Oval, Whangārei
Umpires: Ashley Mehrotra and Derek Walker

- Wellington won the toss and elected to bat.

3 December 2017
Scorecard

Canterbury; 221/9 (50 overs)	v	Otago; 222/7 (47.3 overs)
Todd Astle 51 (82); Jack Hunter 3/19 (4 overs)		Hamish Rutherford 100 (123); Todd Astle 3/35 (10 overs)

Otago won by 3 wickets
Mainpower Oval, Rangiora
Umpires: John Dempsey and Tim Parlane

- Otago won the toss and elected to field.
- Jeremy Benton and Fraser Sheat (Canterbury) both made their List A debuts.

3 December 2017
Scorecard

Central Districts; 224 (44.5 overs)	v	Auckland; 228/5 (41 overs)
Tom Bruce 56 (64); Tarun Nethula 4/64 (10 overs)		Glenn Phillips 48 (41); Blair Tickner 2/57 (10 overs)

Auckland won by 5 wickets
Pukekura Park, New Plymouth
Umpires: John Bromley and Tony Gillies

- Central Districts won the toss and elected to bat.
- Ben Lister (Auckland) made his List A debut.

=== Round 2 ===
6 December 2017
Scorecard

Central Districts; 334/8 (50 overs)	v	Northern Districts; 249 (43.1 overs)
Jesse Ryder 107 (106); Brent Arnel 2/55 (8 overs)		Daryl Mitchell 52 (57); Adam Milne 3/35 (8 overs)

Central Districts won by 85 runs
Cobham Oval, Whangārei
Umpires: Ashley Mehrotra and Derek Walker

- Central Districts won the toss and elected to bat.

6 December 2017
Scorecard

Wellington; 253 (49.1 overs)	v	Otago; 255/4 (46.1 overs)
Devon Conway 74* (100); Jack Hunter 3/35 (6.1 overs)		Shawn Hicks 83* (116); Ian McPeake 1/31 (6 overs)

Otago won by 6 wickets
University Oval, Dunedin
Umpires: John Bromley and Tim Parlane

- Otago won the toss and elected to field.

6 December 2017
Scorecard

Canterbury; 277/9 (50 overs)	v	Auckland; 281/3 (42.3 overs)
Todd Astle 53 (49); Mitchell McClenaghan 4/41 (10 overs)		Colin Munro 174* (118); Tim Johnston 2/47 (10 overs)

Auckland won by 7 wickets
Eden Park Outer Oval, Auckland
Umpires: Tony Gillies and Wayne Knights

- Canterbury won the toss and elected to bat.

=== Round 3 ===
10 December 2017
Scorecard

Auckland; 266/7 (46 overs)	v	Wellington; 274/5 (37.4 overs)
Mark Chapman 125* (119); Hamish Bennett 2/33 (8 overs)		Stephen Murdoch 117 (120); Mitchell McClenaghan 3/60 (9 overs)

Wellington won by 5 wickets (D/L method)
Eden Park Outer Oval, Auckland
Umpires: John Bromley and Ashley Mehrotra

- Wellington won the toss and elected to field.

10 December 2017
Scorecard

Northern Districts; 274 (50 overs)	v	Canterbury; 231 (46.3 overs)
Anton Devcich 59 (74); Matt Henry 3/35 (10 overs)		Michael Pollard 119 (134); Brent Arnel 4/40 (8.3 overs)

Northern Districts won by 43 runs
Hagley Oval, Christchurch
Umpires: Shaun Haig and Wayne Knights

- Northern Districts won the toss and elected to bat.

10 December 2017
Scorecard

Otago; 287/7 (50 overs)	v	Central Districts; 291/7 (46.5 overs)
Michael Rippon 61 (37); Doug Bracewell 3/49 (10 overs)		Dane Cleaver 124* (124); Rob Nicol 2/44 (8 overs)

Central Districts won by 3 wickets
Pukekura Park, New Plymouth
Umpires: Billy Bowden and Tim Parlane

- Otago won the toss and elected to bat.

=== Round 4 ===
27 January 2018
Scorecard

Otago; 254/9 (50 overs)	v	Canterbury; 257/2 (44.2 overs)
Neil Broom 81 (113); Ed Nuttall 4/58 (10 overs)		Chad Bowes 112* (126); James Neesham 1/17 (5 overs)

Canterbury won by 8 wickets
University Oval, Dunedin
Umpires: John Bromley and Tim Parlane

- Otago won the toss and elected to bat.

27 January 2018
Scorecard

Central Districts; 299/7 (50 overs)	v	Auckland; 176 (40.3 overs)
Josh Clarkson 103 (95); Sean Solia 4/46 (8 overs)		Glenn Phillips 43 (72); Adam Milne 2/20 (6 overs)

Central Districts won by 123 runs
Colin Maiden Park, Auckland
Umpires: Billy Bowden and Eugene Sanders

- Central Districts won the toss and elected to bat.
- Graeme Beghin and Jamie Brown (Auckland) both made their List A debuts.

27 January 2018
Scorecard

Wellington; 320/9 (50 overs)	v	Northern Districts; 324/6 (47.3 overs)
Devon Conway 93 (96); Brett Randell 4/44 (10 overs)		Daryl Mitchell 126* (101); Peter Younghusband 2/53 (10 overs)

Northern Districts won by 4 wickets
Basin Reserve, Wellington
Umpires: John Dempsey and Derek Walker

- Northern District won the toss and elected to field.
- Ollie Newton (Wellington) made his List A debut.

=== Round 5 ===
31 January 2018
Scorecard

Otago; 272 (49.2 overs)	v	Wellington; 273/7 (47.2 overs)
James Neesham 62 (48); Logan van Beek 3/35 (9.2 overs)		Malcolm Nofal 108 (111); Jack Hunter 3/57 (9 overs)

Wellington won by 3 wickets
Basin Reserve, Wellington
Umpires: Tony Gillies and Ashley Mehrotra

- Wellington won the toss and elected to field.
- Alex Ridley (Wellington) and Matthew Bacon (Otago) both made their List A debuts.
- Malcolm Nofal (Wellington) scored his first century in List A cricket.

31 January 2018
Scorecard

Auckland; 299/8 (50 overs)	v	Northern Districts; 217 (44.5 overs)
Mark Chapman 71 (62); Brent Arnel 3/47 (9 overs)		Daryl Mitchell 50 (53); Tarun Nethula 5/57 (10 overs)

Auckland won by 82 runs
Cobham Oval, Whangārei
Umpires: Billy Bowden and John Bromley

- Auckland won the toss and elected to bat first.

31 January 2018
Scorecard

Canterbury; 286/7 (50 overs)	v	Central Districts; 287/8 (49.5 overs)
Andrew Ellis 93* (103); Ajaz Patel 2/44 (10 overs)		Ben Smith 82 (111); Andrew Ellis 2/35 (6 overs)

Central Districts won by 2 wickets
Fitzherbert Park, Palmerston North
Umpires: Garth Stirrat and Derek Walker

- Canterbury won the toss and elected to bat.
- Christian Leopard (Central Districts) made his List A debut.

=== Round 6 ===
4 February 2018
Scorecard

Otago; 167 (43.1 overs)	v	Central Districts; 169/4 (24 overs)
James Neesham 40 (48); Blair Tickner 4/43 (10 overs)		George Worker 55 (62); Michael Rae 3/45 (8 overs)

Central Districts won by 6 wickets
Queen's Park, Invercargill
Umpires: Tony Gillies and Eugene Sanders

- Otago won the toss and elected to bat.

4 February 2018
Scorecard

Auckland; 264/9 (50 overs)	v	Wellington; 185 (42.3 overs)
Mark Chapman 117 (104); Logan van Beek 3/55 (10 overs)		Malcolm Nofal 35 (58); Jamie Brown 4/38 (10 overs)

Auckland won by 79 runs
Basin Reserve, Wellington
Umpires: Damian Morrow and Tim Parlane

- Wellington won the toss and elected to field.

4 February 2018
Scorecard

Northern Districts; 247/5 (50 overs)	v	Canterbury; 9/0 (1.5 overs)
Nick Kelly 59 (69); Andrew Ellis 1/25 (3 overs)		Chad Bowes 8* (8)

No result
Cobham Oval, Whangārei
Umpires: Billy Bowden and Tony Gillies

- Northern Districts won the toss and elected to bat.

=== Round 7 ===
7 February 2018
Scorecard

Canterbury; 341/8 (50 overs)	v	Auckland; 228 (47.4 overs)
Henry Nicholls 70 (78); Tarun Nethula 3/43 (9 overs)		Jeet Raval 58 (87); Tim Johnston 3/33 (10 overs)

Canterbury won by 38 runs
Hagley Oval, Christchurch
Umpires: John Dempsey and Tony Gillies

- Canterbury won the toss and elected to bat.

7 February 2018
Scorecard

Northern Districts; 341/8 (50 overs)	v	Otago; 275 (48.1 overs)
Nick Kelly 106 (133); James Neesham 2/27 (4 overs)		Derek de Boorder 77 (75); Brett Hampton 3/31 (7 overs)

Northern Districts won by 66 runs
University Oval, Dunedin
Umpires: Shaun Haig and Derek Walker

- Northern Districts won the toss and elected to bat.

7 February 2018
Scorecard

Wellington; 257/7 (50 overs)	v	Central Districts; 258/7 (47 overs)
Malcolm Nofal 78 (104); Adam Milne 2/39 (10 overs)		George Worker 70 (107); Alex Ridley 3/40 (10 overs)

Central Districts won by 3 wickets
Basin Reserve, Wellington
Umpires: Ashley Mehrotra and Tim Parlane

- Central Districts won the toss and elected to field.

=== Round 8 ===
11 February 2018
Scorecard

Canterbury	v	Wellington

Match abandoned
Hagley Oval, Christchurch
Umpires: Billy Bowden and Ashley Mehrotra

- No toss.

11 February 2018
Scorecard

Central Districts	v	Northern Districts

Match abandoned
McLean Park, Napier
Umpires: Tim Parlane and Derek Walker

- No toss.

11 February 2018
Scorecard

Auckland	v	Otago

Match abandoned
Eden Park Outer Oval, Auckland
Umpires: Tony Gillies and Wayne Knights

- No toss.

== Finals ==
1st Preliminary Final
17 February 2018
Scorecard

Auckland; 240 (45.5 overs)	v	Central Districts; 191/3 (25.4 overs)
Ben Horne 63 (52); Doug Bracewell 3/60 (9.5 overs)		Jesse Ryder 53* (34); Sean Solia 1/17 (2 overs)

Central Districts won by 7 wickets (D/L method)
Pukekura Park, New Plymouth
Umpires: Tony Gillies and Derek Walker

- Central Districts won the toss and elected to field.
- Finn Allen (Auckland) made his List A debut.

2nd Preliminary Final
17 February 2018
Scorecard

Canterbury; 287 (49.2 overs)	v	Northern Districts; 119 (31.2 overs)
Henry Nicholls 122 (131); Brent Arnel 4/45 (9.2 overs)		Joe Walker 31* (31); Matt Henry 3/21 (8.2 overs)

Canterbury won by 168 runs
Cobham Oval, Whangārei
Umpires: Billy Bowden and Ashley Mehrotra

- Canterbury won the toss and elected to bat.

3rd Preliminary Final
21 February 2018
Scorecard

Auckland; 304/6 (50 overs)	v	Canterbury; 197 (37.2 overs)
Jeet Raval 149 (153); Andrew Ellis 2/52 (7 overs)		Michael Pollard 47 (50); Tarun Nethula 4/43 (9.2 overs)

Auckland won by 107 runs
Colin Maiden Park, Auckland
Umpires: Derek Walker and Tim Parlane

- Auckland won the toss and elected to bat.

Final
24 February 2018
Scorecard

Central Districts; 197 (46.4 overs)	v	Auckland; 201/4 (32.4 overs)
Tom Bruce 49 (48); Lockie Ferguson 3/28 (9.4 overs)		Glenn Phillips 63 (75); Ben Wheeler 2/31 (5 overs)

Auckland won by 6 wickets
Pukekura Park, New Plymouth
Umpires: Tim Parlane and Billy Bowden

- Central Districts won the toss and elected to bat.
