= New Zealand cricket team in South Africa in 2015 =

International cricket tour

	South Africa	New Zealand
- Dates: 14 August 2015 – 26 August 2015
Captains	AB de Villiers	Kane Williamson

One Day International series
- Results: South Africa won the 3-match series 2–1
Most runs	Hashim Amla (176)	Tom Latham (178)
Most wickets	Imran Tahir (5), David Wiese (5)	Adam Milne (5)
- Player of the series: Hashim Amla (SA)

Twenty20 International series
- Results: 2-match series drawn 1–1
Most runs	Rilee Rossouw (64)	Martin Guptill (102)
Most wickets	Kagiso Rabada (5)	Mitchell McClenaghan (3)
- Player of the series: Martin Guptill (NZ)

The New Zealand cricket team toured South Africa from 14 to 26 August 2015. The tour consisted of three One Day International and two Twenty20 International matches. In June Brendon McCullum was named as the captain for New Zealand on this tour. However, in July, it was announced that McCullum had been rested for this tour and the tour to Zimbabwe, being replaced by Kane Williamson.

South Africa won the ODI series 2–1 and the T20I series was drawn 1–1.

== Squads ==
ODIs		T20Is	
South Africa	New Zealand	South Africa	New Zealand
AB de Villiers (c); Kyle Abbott; Hashim Amla; Farhaan Behardien; ~~Faf du Plessis~~^{1}; David Miller; Aaron Phangiso; Vernon Philander; Kagiso Rabada; Rilee Rossouw; Dale Steyn; Imran Tahir; Morne van Wyk; David Wiese; Dean Elgar	Kane Williamson (c); Doug Bracewell; Grant Elliott; Martin Guptill; Matt Henry; Tom Latham; Mitchell McClenaghan; Nathan McCullum; Adam Milne; Colin Munro; James Neesham; Luke Ronchi; Mitchell Santner; ~~Ross Taylor~~^{1}; Ben Wheeler	AB de Villiers (c); Kyle Abbott; Hashim Amla; Farhaan Behardien; ~~Faf du Plessis~~ ^{1}; JP Duminy; Eddie Leie; David Miller; Morne Morkel; Aaron Phangiso; Kagiso Rabada; Rilee Rossouw; Morne van Wyk; David Wiese	Kane Williamson (c); Doug Bracewell; Grant Elliott; Martin Guptill; Matt Henry; Tom Latham; Mitchell McClenaghan; Nathan McCullum; Adam Milne; Colin Munro; James Neesham; Luke Ronchi; Mitchell Santner; ~~Ross Taylor~~^{1}; Ben Wheeler

^{1} Ross Taylor was injured in training the day before the 3rd ODI against Zimbabwe and was ruled out of the rest of New Zealand's tour in Africa. Faf du Plessis was injured for the T20I series, so AB de Villiers captained South Africa. The injury ruled out du Plessis for the ODI and T20I series. Farhaan Behardien and Dean Elgar were added to the squad.

== T20I series ==
=== 1st T20I ===
14 August 2015
Scorecard

New Zealand; 151/8 (20 overs)	v	South Africa; 152/4 (17.5 overs)
Kane Williamson 42 (21); David Wiese 2/24 (4 overs)		Hashim Amla 48 (41); Doug Bracewell 1/17 (3 overs)

South Africa won by 6 wickets
Kingsmead, Durban
Umpires: Johan Cloete (SA) and Shaun George (SA)
Player of the match: Aaron Phangiso (SA)

- South Africa won the toss and elected to field.

=== 2nd T20I ===
16 August 2015
Scorecard

New Zealand; 177/7 (20 overs)	v	South Africa; 145/8 (20 overs)
Martin Guptill 60 (35); Kagiso Rabada 3/30 (4 overs)		Farhaan Behardien 36 (27); Ish Sodhi 2/27 (4 overs)

New Zealand won by 32 runs
Centurion Park, Centurion
Umpires: Johan Cloete (SA) and Shaun George (SA)
Player of the match: Martin Guptill (NZ)

- New Zealand won the toss and elected to bat.

== ODI series ==
=== 1st ODI ===
19 August 2015
Scorecard

South Africa; 304/7 (50 overs)	v	New Zealand; 284 (48.1 overs)
Hashim Amla 124 (126); Adam Milne 2/51 (10 overs)		Tom Latham 60 (80); Imran Tahir 2/40 (10 overs)

South Africa won by 20 runs
Centurion Park, Centurion
Umpires: Johan Cloete (SA) and Ian Gould (Eng)
Player of the match: Hashim Amla (SA)

- New Zealand won the toss and elected to field.
- David Wiese (SA) made his ODI debut.

=== 2nd ODI ===
23 August 2015
Scorecard

South Africa; 204 (49.3 overs)	v	New Zealand; 207/2 (44.3 overs)
Farhaan Behardien 70 (87); Doug Bracewell 3/31 (10 overs)		Martin Guptill 103* (134); Aaron Phangiso 1/37 (10 overs)

New Zealand won by 8 wickets
Senwes Park, Potchefstroom
Umpires: Shaun George (SA) and Ian Gould (Eng)
Player of the match: Martin Guptill (NZ)

- South Africa won the toss and elected to bat.
- George Worker (NZ) made his ODI debut.

=== 3rd ODI ===
26 August 2015 (D/N)
Scorecard

South Africa; 283/7 (50 overs)	v	New Zealand; 221 (49.2 overs)
AB de Villiers 64 (48); Ben Wheeler 3/71 (10 overs)		Tom Latham 54 (74); David Wiese 3/58 (9 overs)

South Africa won by 62 runs
Kingsmead, Durban
Umpires: Johan Cloete (SA) and Ian Gould (Eng)
Player of the match: AB de Villiers (SA)

- South Africa won the toss and elected to bat.
