= New Zealand cricket team in Zimbabwe in 2015 =

International cricket tour

	Zimbabwe	New Zealand
- Dates: 2 August 2015 – 9 August 2015
Captains	Elton Chigumbura	Kane Williamson

One Day International series
- Results: New Zealand won the 3-match series 2–1
Most runs	Craig Ervine (174)	Kane Williamson (187)
Most wickets	Graeme Cremer (3)	Nathan McCullum (5)
- Player of the series: Kane Williamson (NZ)

Twenty20 International series
- Results: New Zealand won the 1-match series 1–0
Most runs	Craig Ervine (42)	George Worker (62)
Most wickets	Sean Williams (3)	Adam Milne (2); Mitchell McClenaghan (2)
- Player of the series: Craig Ervine (Zim)

The New Zealand cricket team toured Zimbabwe between 2 and 9 August 2015. The tour consisted of three One Day International (ODI) matches and one Twenty20 International (T20I). For the first ODI, New Zealand played under the name of Aotearoa. This is the Māori name for New Zealand. The tour coincided with te Wiki o te Reo Māori (Māori Language Week).

In June Brendon McCullum was confirmed as the captain for New Zealand on this tour. However, in July, it was announced that McCullum had been rested for this tour and the tour to South Africa, being replaced by Kane Williamson. New Zealand won the ODI series 2–1 and the T20I series 1–0.

== Squads ==
ODIs		T20Is	
Zimbabwe	New Zealand	Zimbabwe	New Zealand
Elton Chigumbura (c); Regis Chakabva; Chamu Chibhabha; Graeme Cremer; Craig Ervine; Luke Jongwe; Neville Madziva; Hamilton Masakadza; Christopher Mpofu; John Nyumbu; Tinashe Panyangara; Sikandar Raza; Vusi Sibanda; Prosper Utseya; Sean Williams	Kane Williamson (c); Grant Elliott; Martin Guptill; Matt Henry; Tom Latham; Mitchell McClenaghan; Nathan McCullum; Adam Milne; Colin Munro; James Neesham; Luke Ronchi; ~~Mitchell Santner~~; Ish Sodhi; Ross Taylor; Ben Wheeler; George Worker	Elton Chigumbura (c); Regis Chakabva; Chamu Chibhabha; Graeme Cremer; Craig Ervine; Luke Jongwe; Hamilton Masakadza; Christopher Mpofu; Taurai Muzarabani; John Nyumbu; Tinashe Panyangara; Sikandar Raza; Prosper Utseya; Malcolm Waller; Sean Williams	Kane Williamson (c); Grant Elliott; Martin Guptill; Matt Henry; Tom Latham; Mitchell McClenaghan; Nathan McCullum; Adam Milne; Colin Munro; James Neesham; Luke Ronchi; ~~Mitchell Santner~~; Ish Sodhi; ~~Ross Taylor~~; Ben Wheeler; George Worker

New Zealand's Mitchell Santner was ruled out of the tour after fracturing his thumb. He was replaced by George Worker. Ross Taylor was injured in training the day before the 3rd ODI and was ruled out of the rest of the tour.

== ODI series ==
=== 1st ODI ===
2 August 2015
Scorecard

New Zealand; 303/4 (50 overs)	v	Zimbabwe; 304/3 (49.0 overs)
Ross Taylor 112* (122); Tinashe Panyangara 2/50 (10 overs)		Craig Ervine 130* (108); Nathan McCullum 3/62 (9 overs)

Zimbabwe won by 7 wickets
Harare Sports Club, Harare
Umpires: Richard Illingworth (Eng) and Russell Tiffin (Zim)
Player of the match: Craig Ervine (Zim)

- Zimbabwe won the toss and elected to field.
- Ish Sodhi (NZ) made his ODI debut.

=== 2nd ODI ===
4 August 2015
Scorecard

Zimbabwe; 235/9 (50.0 ov)	v	New Zealand; 236/0 (42.2 overs)
Sikandar Raza 100* (95); Ish Sodhi 3/38 (10 overs)		Martin Guptill 116* (138)

New Zealand won by 10 wickets
Harare Sports Club, Harare
Umpires: Richard Illingworth (Eng) and Jeremiah Matibiri (Zim)
Player of the match: Martin Guptill (NZ) and Tom Latham (NZ)

- Zimbabwe won the toss and elected to bat.

=== 3rd ODI ===
7 August 2015
Scorecard

New Zealand; 273/6 (50 overs)	v	Zimbabwe; 235 (47.4 overs)
Kane Williamson 90 (109); Graeme Cremer 3/44 (10 overs)		Sean Williams 63 (62); Mitchell McClenaghan 3/36 (8.4 overs)

New Zealand won by 38 runs
Harare Sports Club, Harare
Umpires: Richard Illingworth (Eng) and Jeremiah Matibiri (Zim)
Player of the match: Kane Williamson (NZ)

- Zimbabwe won the toss and elected to field.

== T20I series ==
=== Only T20I ===
9 August 2015
Scorecard

New Zealand; 198/5 (20 overs)	v	Zimbabwe; 118/8 (20 overs)
George Worker 62 (38); Sean Williams 3/28 (4 overs)		Craig Ervine 42 (46); Adam Milne 2/10 (4 overs)

New Zealand won by 80 runs
Harare Sports Club, Harare
Umpires: Langton Rusere (Zim) and Russell Tiffin (Zim)
Player of the match: George Worker (NZ)

- Zimbabwe won the toss and elected to field.
- George Worker (NZ) made his T20I debut.
