= Jakob Bhula =

New Zealand cricketer (born 1999)

Personal information
- Full name: Jakob Jarrod Naran Patel Bhula
- Born: 12 December 1999 (age 26); Wellington, New Zealand
- Bowling: Off spin
- Role: Opening batsman, All-rounder
- Source: Cricinfo, 24 October 2018

Jakob Jarrod Naran Patel Bhula (born 12 December 1999) is a New Zealand cricketer. Bhula was born to an Indian Gujarati family on 12 December 1999 in Wellington, New Zealand.

== Career ==
He made his List A debut for Wellington in the 2018–19 Ford Trophy on 24 October 2018. Prior to his List A debut, he was named in New Zealand's squad for the 2018 Under-19 Cricket World Cup. During the tournament, he scored 180 runs against Kenya, the highest individual total in all Under-19 World Cups.

He made his first-class debut for Wellington in the 2018–19 Plunket Shield season on 6 December 2018. He made his Twenty20 debut on 6 January 2022, for Wellington in the 2021–22 Super Smash.
