= Felix Murray =

New Zealand cricketer (born 1998)

Personal information
- Born: 29 October 1998 (age 28)
- Source: Cricinfo, 17 March 2018

Felix Murray (born 29 October 1998) is a New Zealand cricketer, who bats left-handed and bowls slow left-arm orthodox. He made his first-class debut for Central Districts in the 2017–18 Plunket Shield season on 17 March 2018. Prior to his first-class debut, he was named in New Zealand's squad for the 2018 Under-19 Cricket World Cup.

He made his List A debut for Central Districts in the 2018–19 Ford Trophy on 24 October 2018. He made his Twenty20 debut for Central Districts in the 2018–19 Super Smash on 27 December 2018.
