= Joe Wheeler (rugby union) =

NZ rugby union player

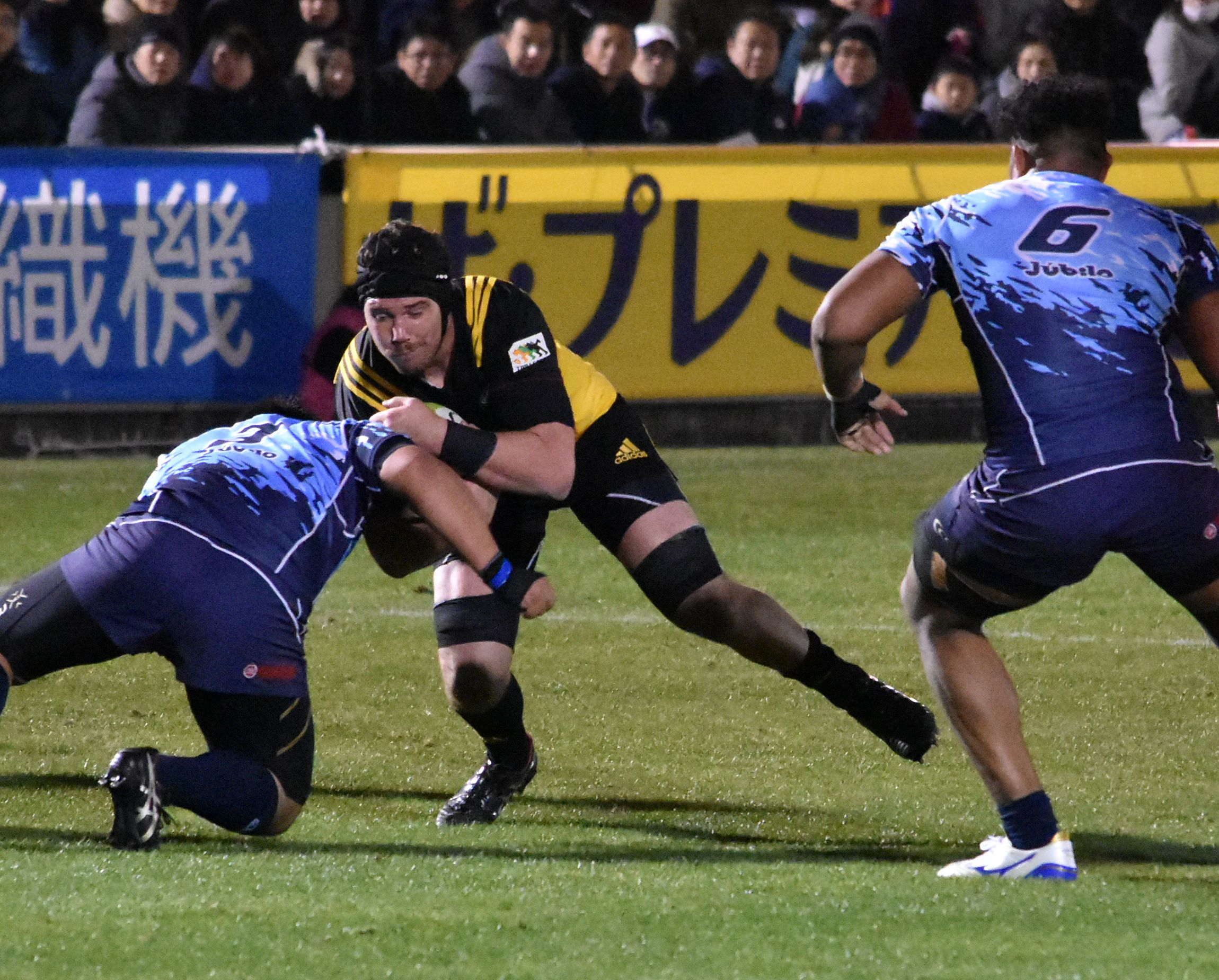
- Born: Joseph Thomas Wheeler; 20 October 1987 (age 39) Christchurch, New Zealand
- Height: 2.00 m (6 ft 6 1/2 in)
- Weight: 115 kg (18 st 2 lb; 254 lb)
- School: Marlborough Boys' College
- Notable relative(s): Ben Wheeler (brother); Ray Dowker (grandfather)

Rugby union career
- Position(s): Lock; Flanker
Senior career
Years	Team	Apps	(Points)
2016−2020	Suntory Sungoliath	48	(10)
- Correct as of 19 August 2020
Provincial / State sides
Years	Team	Apps	(Points)
2008–2015, 2019	Tasman	80	(40)
- Correct as of 19 August 2020
Super Rugby
Years	Team	Apps	(Points)
2010–2012	Crusaders	4	(0)
2013–2017	Highlanders	65	(5)
- Correct as of 19 August 2020
International career
Years	Team	Apps	(Points)
2013–2015, 2017	Māori All Blacks	5	(0)
- Correct as of 19 August 2020

Joseph Thomas Wheeler (born 20 October 1987) is a New Zealand television presenter and former rugby union player. He played as a lock or flanker for Suntory Sungoliath in the Japanese Top League. Wheeler was selected in the New Zealand Māori All Blacks and represented them on the November 2013 tour of North America.

== Rugby career ==
A product of the Marlborough Boys' College 1st XV, Wheeler made his Super Rugby debut for the Crusaders against the Sharks in 2010. He joined the Highlanders for the 2013 Super Rugby season on a two-year deal.

== Television career ==
After retiring from playing rugby, Wheeler was hired by Sky Sport to commentate rugby.

In April 2021, Wheeler apologised after mimicking an Asian accent in an offensive way when talking about former teammate Kazuki Himeno during a post-match interview with another Highlanders player.

== Personal life ==
Wheeler comes from a successful sporting family of Ngāi Tahu descent: his brother Ben Wheeler is a cricketer who plays for Central Districts; and his grandfather Ray Dowker was a multi-talented athlete who represented Canterbury in cricket, football and many other codes.

In December 2015, Wheeler became engaged to his girlfriend of six years Courtney MacKay, one of the contestants from season 5 of The Block NZ. They married in 2017, and had a daughter in 2019.
