= Willem Ludick =

South African cricketer (born 1997)

Willem Cornelius Ludick
Personal information
- Born: 20 March 1997 (age 29); Pretoria, South Africa

Domestic team information
- Years: Team
- 2017/18–2019/20: Central Districts
- Source: Cricinfo, 17 March 2018

Willem Cornelius Ludick (born 20 March 1997) is a South African-born cricketer who has played domestic cricket in New Zealand. In 2020, Ludick had moved to Texas, with an aim of possibly representing the United States. He is the grandson of South African Olympic boxer Willie Ludick.

== Career ==
He made his first-class debut for the Central Stags, also known as Central Districts in the 2017–18 Plunket Shield season on 17 March 2018. Prior to his first-class debut, he was part of South Africa's squad for the 2016 Under-19 Cricket World Cup.

In June 2018, he was awarded a contract with Central Districts for the 2018–19 season. He made his List A debut for Central Districts in the 2018–19 Ford Trophy on 24 October 2018.

On 7 November 2018, in the fifth round fixture of the 2018–19 Ford Trophy between Central Districts and Northern Districts cricket team, he conceded 43 runs from one over, the most in List A cricket. Central Districts' batsmen Joe Carter and Brett Hampton scored the runs, which included two no-balls, six sixes, a four and a single.

He made his Twenty20 debut for Central Districts in the 2018–19 Super Smash on 31 December 2018. In June 2020, it was announced he was leaving the Central Stags to pursue his cricket career in the United States. In June 2021, Ludick was selected in the players' draft ahead of the Minor League Cricket tournament.
