= Lauchie Johns =

New Zealand cricketer (born 1996)

Personal information
- Born: 1 July 1996 (age 30)
- Source: Cricinfo, 24 November 2017

Lauchlan Ritchie Johns (born 1 July 1996), known professionally as Lauchie Johns is a New Zealand cricketer. He plays as a wicket-keeper. He made his first-class debut for Wellington in the 2017–18 Plunket Shield season on 24 November 2017. He made his List A debut for New Zealand XI against Pakistan on 3 January 2018. In June 2018, he was awarded a contract with Wellington for the 2018–19 season.

On 24 October 2018, during the 2018–19 Ford Trophy match against Canterbury, he set a new List A record in New Zealand for the most catches in a match, with seven. He made his Twenty20 debut for Wellington in the 2018–19 Super Smash on 9 February 2019.

In June 2020, he was offered a contract by Wellington ahead of the 2020–21 domestic cricket season. Johns will embark on his first overseas club placement in the 2022 English season, featuring for Camberley Cricket Club in the Surrey Championship.
