= Ray Dowker =

New Zealand cricketer

Personal information
- Full name: Raymond Thomas Dowker
- Born: 6 July 1919; New Brighton, Christchurch, Canterbury, New Zealand
- Died: 17 December 2004 (aged 85); Christchurch, Canterbury, New Zealand
- Batting: Right-handed
- Role: Batsman
- Relatives: Joe Wheeler (grandson); Ben Wheeler (grandson)

Domestic team information
- Years: Team
- 1949/50–1956/57: Canterbury
- FC debut: 7 January 1950 Canterbury v Otago
- Last FC: 15 February 1957 Canterbury v Auckland

Career statistics
Competition	First-class
Matches	24
Runs scored	1,147
Batting average	30.18
100s/50s	1/7
Top score	122
Balls bowled	56
Wickets	3
Bowling average	15.66
5 wickets in innings	0
10 wickets in match	0
Best bowling	2/25
Catches/stumpings	16/–
- Source: CricketArchive, 17 October 2009

Raymond Thomas Dowker (6 July 1919 – 17 December 2004) was a New Zealand cricketer who played first-class cricket for Canterbury between 1949 and 1957.

A right-handed batsman, Dowker played 24 games – scoring 1,147 runs at 30.18 including one century, 122 against Auckland on 7 January 1955. Born in New Brighton, in Christchurch, Canterbury, New Zealand, he was one of the New Zealand Cricket Almanack Players of the Year for 1955. With 366 runs at an average of 45.75, he was the highest scorer in the Plunket Shield in the 1954–55 season. In 1955-56 he captained Canterbury to outright victory in all four of their Plunket Shield matches, thus winning the trophy.

Dowker was also a successful football player and won the 1945 Chatham Cup with Western AFC. He went on to represent Canterbury at football in 1948.

His grandsons have also been successful in New Zealand sport. The sons of his daughter Catherine Wheeler (née Dowker), Joe Wheeler and Ben Wheeler, have played Rugby and cricket respectively for regional and national teams.
