= Tom MacRury =

New Zealand cricketer (born 1994)

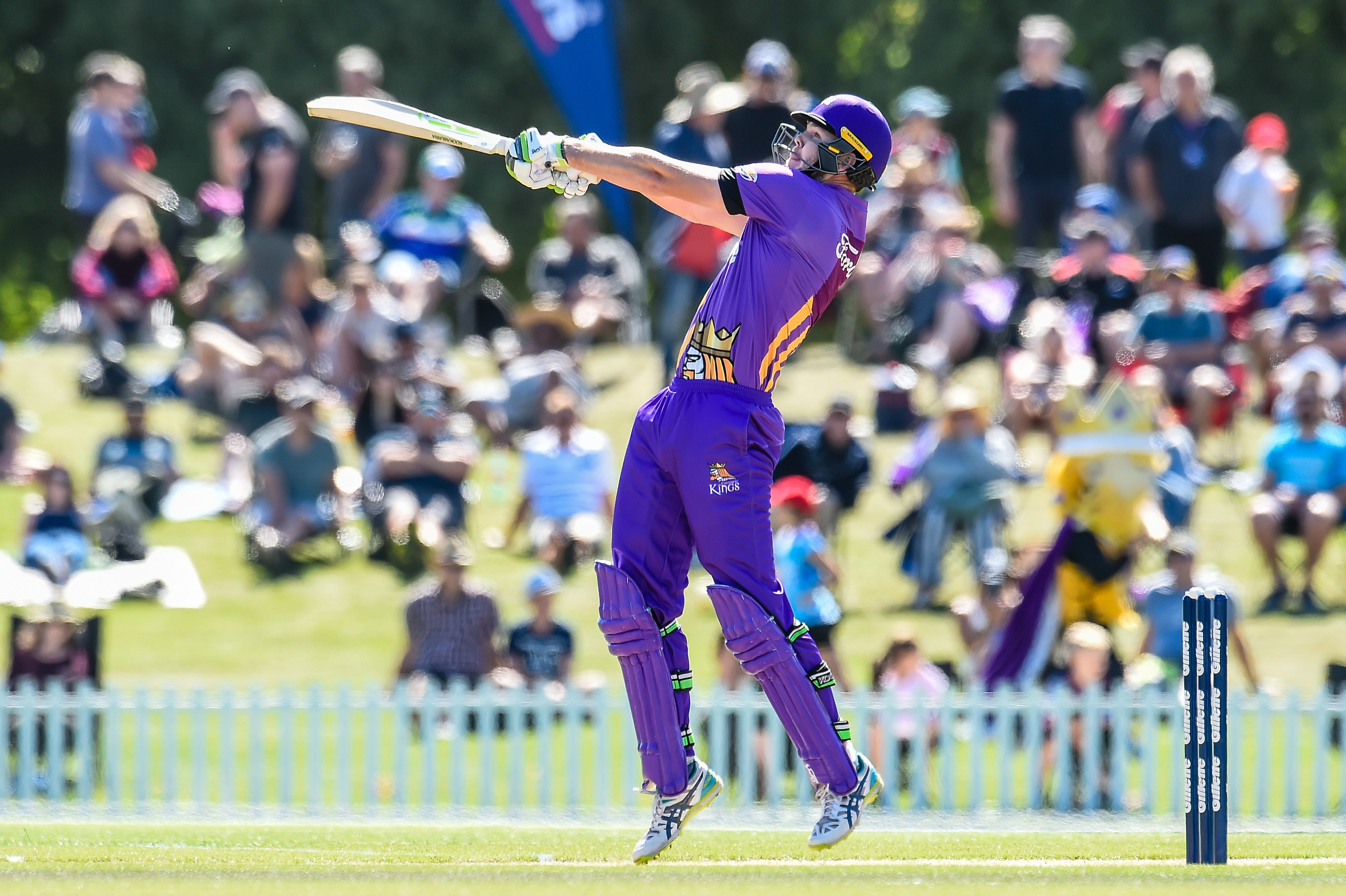
- MacRury in 2019

Personal information
- Born: 21 August 1994 (age 32); Tauranga, New Zealand
- Nickname: Moxy
- Height: 2.01 m (6 ft 7 in)
- Batting: Left-handed
- Bowling: Right-arm off break
- Role: All Rounder

Domestic team information
- Years: Team
- 2019: Canterbury cricket team
- Source: Cricinfo, 25 January 2019

Tom MacRury (born 21 August 1994) is a New Zealand cricketer. He made his Twenty20 debut for Canterbury in the 2018–19 Super Smash on 26 January 2019.

MacRury is an off spin bowler and a top-order left-handed batsman. In 2023, MacRury joined Grappenhall CC in the Cheshire Premier League, becoming the first Grappers cricketer to score 500 runs and take 50 wickets in the same season.

In December 2023, Tom MacRury re-signed with Grappenhall for the 2024 season.

In May 2024, MacRury made the fastest 1st XI league century in Grappenhall's history, from 61 balls.
