= Jamie Brown (cricketer) =

New Zealand cricketer (born 1993)

Personal information
- Full name: Jamie Brown
- Born: 20 June 1993 (age 33)
- Source: Cricinfo, 27 January 2018

Jamie Brown (born 20 June 1993) is a New Zealand cricketer. He made his List A debut for Auckland in the 2017–18 Ford Trophy on 27 January 2018. He made his first-class debut for Auckland in the 2017–18 Plunket Shield season on 1 March 2018. In June 2018, he was awarded a contract with Auckland for the 2018–19 season. In September 2018, he was named in the Auckland Aces' squad for the 2018 Abu Dhabi T20 Trophy. He made his Twenty20 debut for the Auckland Aces in the 2018 Abu Dhabi T20 Trophy on 4 October 2018.

In June 2020, he was offered a contract by Auckland ahead of the 2020–21 domestic cricket season.
