= Alex Ridley =

New Zealand cricketer (born 1996)

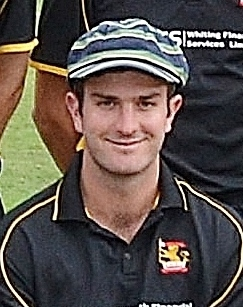

Personal information
- Born: 5 July 1996 (age 30)
- Source: Cricinfo, 31 January 2018

Alex Ridley (born 5 July 1996) is a New Zealand cricketer. He made his List A debut for Wellington in the 2017–18 Ford Trophy on 31 January 2018. He made his first-class debut for Wellington in the 2017–18 Plunket Shield season on 1 March 2018.
