= Joe Carter (cricketer) =

New Zealander cricketer (born 1992)

Personal information
- Full name: Joseph Franklyn Carter
- Born: 17 December 1992 (age 33); Hemel Hempstead, Hertfordshire, England
- Batting: Right-handed
- Bowling: Right-arm off break
- Role: Batsman

Domestic team information
- Years: Team
- 2013/14–present: Northern Districts
- FC debut: 31 October 2013 Northern Districts v Auckland
- LA debut: 5 March 2014 Northern Districts v Otago

Career statistics
Competition	FC	LA	T20
Matches	88	74	54
Runs scored	5458	2211	959
Batting average	37.38	35.09	21.79
100s/50s	12/31	3/14	0/5
Top score	197	106	83
Catches/stumpings	69/–	33/–	18/–
- Source: Cricinfo, 21 March 2026

Joseph Franklyn Carter (born 17 December 1992) is a New Zealand cricketer who plays for Northern Districts. Educated at Tauranga Boys' College where he captained the 2010 First XI, Carter made his Twenty20 debut for Northern Districts on 4 December 2016 in the 2016–17 Super Smash. Prior to his Twenty20 debut, he was part of New Zealand's squad for the 2012 Under-19 Cricket World Cup.

On 7 November 2018, in the fifth round fixture of the 2018–19 Ford Trophy between Northern Districts and Central Districts, he and Brett Hampton set a new record in List A cricket for the most runs scored off one over, with 43. The over was bowled by Willem Ludick and included two no-balls, six sixes, a four and a single.

In March 2020, in round five of the 2019–20 Plunket Shield season, Carter and Mark Chapman scored centuries in both innings of the match. It was the first time that two batsman had scored a century in each innings in the same match in the Plunket Shield. In November 2020, Carter was named in the New Zealand A cricket team for practice matches against the touring West Indies team.
