= Aniket Parikh =

New Zealand cricketer (born 1997)

Personal information
- Full name: Aniket Arpon Parikh
- Born: 7 July 1997 (age 29); Gujarat, India
- Source: ESPNcricinfo, 26 February 2017

Aniket Arpon Parikh (born 7 July 1997) is a New Zealand cricketer. He made his first-class debut for Auckland on 25 February 2017 in the 2016–17 Plunket Shield season. Prior to his debut, he was named in New Zealand's squad for the 2016 Under-19 Cricket World Cup.

He made his List A debut for New Zealand XI against Pakistan on 3 January 2018.
