= Christian Leopard =

New Zealand cricketer (born 1997)

Personal information
- Born: 17 September 1997 (age 29); Hastings, New Zealand
- Source: ESPNcricinfo, 5 November 2016

Christian Leopard (born 17 September 1997) is a New Zealand cricketer. He made his first-class debut for Central Districts on 5 November 2016 in the 2016–17 Plunket Shield season. Prior to his debut, he was part of New Zealand's squad for the 2016 Under-19 Cricket World Cup.

He made his Twenty20 debut for Central Districts in the 2017–18 Super Smash on 22 December 2017. He made his List A debut for Central Districts in the 2017–18 Ford Trophy on 31 January 2018. In June 2018, he was awarded a contract with Central Districts for the 2018–19 season.
