= Ollie Newton =

New Zealand cricketer (born 1988)

Personal information
- Full name: Oliver Robert Newton
- Born: 22 August 1988 (age 38); Dunedin, New Zealand
- Batting: Left-handed
- Bowling: Right-arm medium

Domestic team information
- Years: Team
- 2015-present: Wellington (squad no. 33)
- Source: ESPNcricinfo, 22 November 2016

Ollie Newton (born 22 August 1988) is a New Zealand cricketer. He made his Twenty20 debut for Wellington on 6 December 2015 in the 2015–16 Georgie Pie Super Smash. He made his first-class debut for Wellington in the 2017–18 Plunket Shield season on 23 October 2017. He made his List A debut for Wellington in the 2017–18 Ford Trophy on 27 January 2018. In June 2018, he was awarded a contract with Wellington for the 2018–19 season. He was the joint-leading wicket-taker for Wellington in the 2018–19 Super Smash, with eleven dismissals in nine matches.

In June 2020, he was offered a contract by Wellington ahead of the 2020–21 domestic cricket season.
