= Blake Coburn =

New Zealand cricketer

Personal information
- Full name: Blake Peter Coburn
- Born: 25 December 1995 (age 30); Christchurch, New Zealand
- Batting: Right-handed
- Bowling: Slow left-arm wrist-spin
- Role: Bowler

Domestic team information
- Years: Team
- 2017–18 to 2022–23: Canterbury

Career statistics
Competition	FC	LA	T20
Matches	8	9	17
Runs scored	50	42	44
Batting average	5.55	8.40	14.66
100s/50s	0/0	0/0	0/0
Top score	17	15*	12*
Balls bowled	880	377	294
Wickets	16	10	11
Bowling average	33.06	38.20	37.18
5 wickets in innings	1	0	0
10 wickets in match	0	–	–
Best bowling	7/64	2/25	4/17
Catches/stumpings	1/–	2/–	5/–
- Source: Cricinfo, 10 June 2023

Blake Peter Coburn (born 25 December 1995) is a New Zealand cricketer. He played for Canterbury from 2017–18 to 2022–23.

Coburn was born in Christchurch and educated there at Shirley Boys' High School. A left-arm wrist-spin bowler, he has an unusual bowling action: his torso rotates downward and his head gets below the horizontal when releasing the ball.

Coburn made his first-class debut for Canterbury in the 2017–18 Plunket Shield season on 23 October 2017. In November 2017, in his second match, he took 7 for 64 in the second innings to lead Canterbury to victory over Northern Districts by 8 runs. He made his Twenty20 debut for Canterbury in the 2017–18 Super Smash on 17 December 2017.

He made his List A debut for Canterbury in the 2018–19 Ford Trophy on 7 November 2018. After some time out of the Canterbury team, he was awarded a contract for the 2022–23 season.

Coburn announced his retirement from professional cricket in June 2023, aged 27.
