= Andrew Fletcher (cricketer) =

New Zealand cricketer (born 1993)

Personal information
- Born: 29 March 1993 (age 33)
- Source: Cricinfo, 10 October 2018

Andrew Fletcher (born 29 March 1993) is a New Zealand cricketer. He made his first-class debut for Wellington in the 2018–19 Plunket Shield season on 10 October 2018.

He made his List A debut for Wellington in the 2018–19 Ford Trophy on 24 October 2018, scoring 132 runs not out. One week later, in his third List A match, he scored his second century for Wellington, with 125 runs from 150 balls. He finished the tournament as the leading run-scorer, with 618 runs in twelve matches.

In June 2020, he was offered a contract by Wellington ahead of the 2020–21 domestic cricket season.
