= Brett Hampton =

New Zealand cricketer (born 1991)

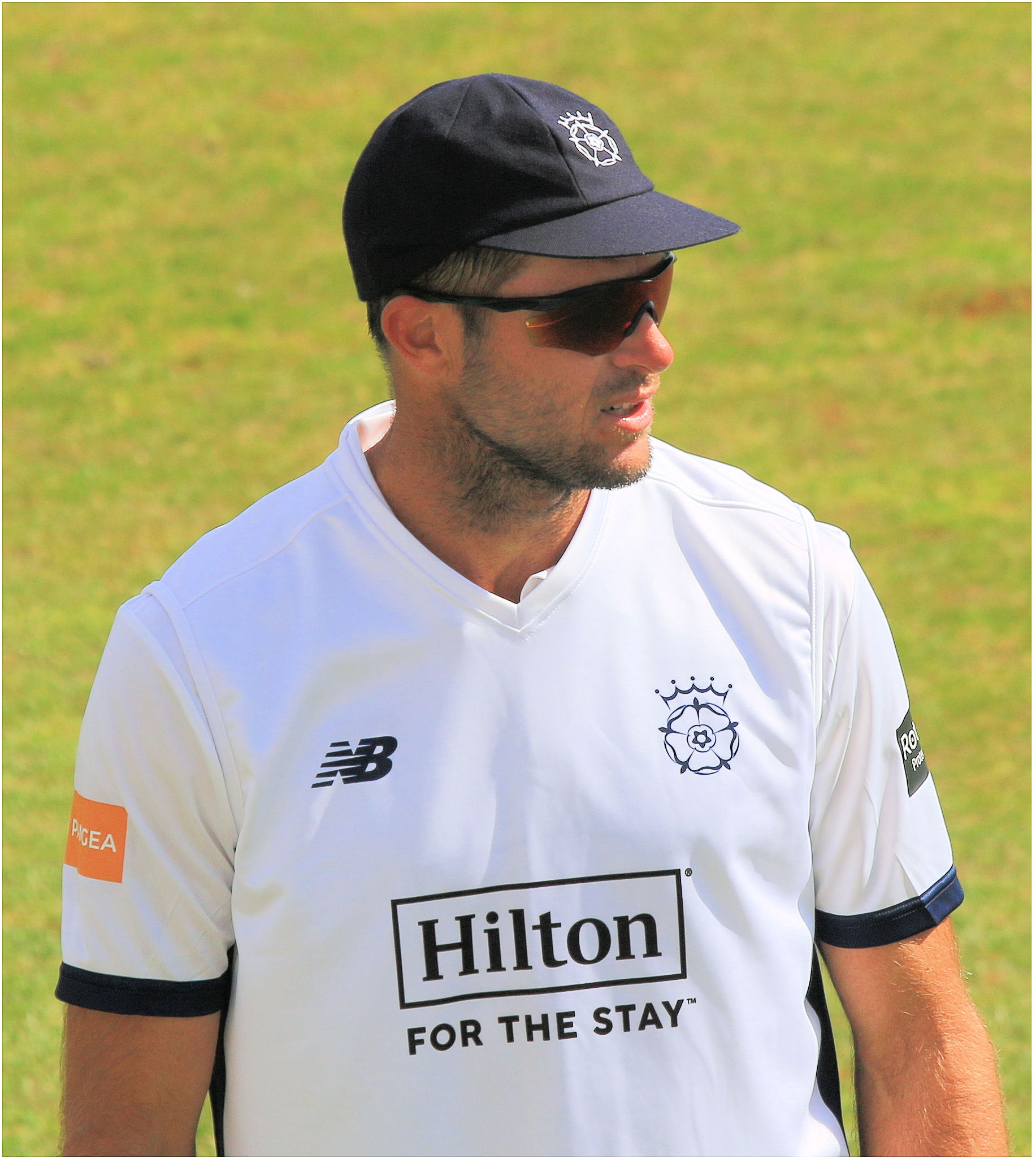
- Hampton playing for Hampshire in 2025

Personal information
- Born: 30 April 1991 (age 35); Tauranga, New Zealand
- Batting: Right-handed
- Bowling: Right-arm fast-medium
- Role: All-rounder

Domestic team information
- Years: Team
- 2011/12–present: Northern Districts
- 2017/18: Canterbury
- 2025: Hampshire
- First-class debut: 23 October 2015 Northern Districts v Auckland
- List A debut: 2 March 2014 Northern Districts v Auckland

Career statistics
| Competition | FC | LA | T20 |
|---|---|---|---|
| Matches | 45 | 93 | 75 |
| Runs scored | 1,715 | 2,123 | 908 |
| Batting average | 28.11 | 34.80 | 15.92 |
| 100s/50s | 2/10 | 1/14 | 0/3 |
| Top score | 121 | 126* | 64 |
| Balls bowled | 5,208 | 3,167 | 476 |
| Wickets | 94 | 82 | 30 |
| Bowling average | 30.06 | 34.32 | 23.13 |
| 5 wickets in innings | 2 | 0 | 0 |
| 10 wickets in match | 0 | 0 | – |
| Best bowling | 7/41 | 4/30 | 3/1 |
| Catches/stumpings | 24/– | 27/– | 37/– |
- Source: Cricinfo, 31 December 2025

Brett Hampton (born 30 April 1991) is a New Zealand cricketer who plays for Northern Districts. Educated at Tauranga Boys' College, he made his first-class debut on 23 October 2015 in the 2015–16 Plunket Shield. In June 2018, he was awarded a contract with Northern Districts for the 2018–19 season.

On 7 November 2018, in the fifth round fixture of the 2018–19 Ford Trophy between Northern Districts and Central Districts, he and Joe Carter set a new record in List A cricket for the most runs scored off one over, with 43. The over was bowled by Willem Ludick and included two no-balls, six sixes, a four and a single.

On 10 March 2024, he scored his maiden century in first-class cricket, against Auckland in the 2023–24 Plunket Shield season.

Hampton signed a short-term contract with Hampshire County Cricket Club in March 2025, to play in the opening two months of that year's English County Championship.
