= List of international cricket centuries by Kane Williamson =

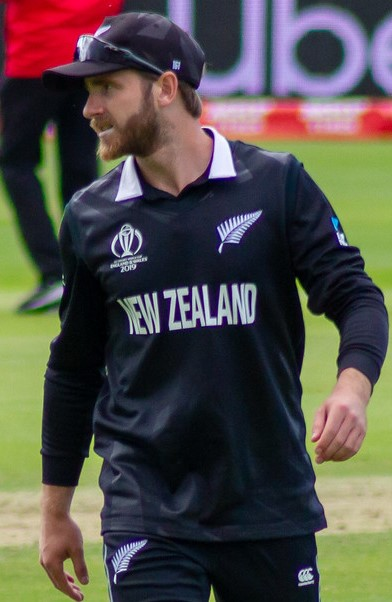
Kane Williamson fielding in a 2019 Cricket World Cup match vs. Afghanistan

Kane Williamson is an international cricketer who represented the New Zealand national cricket team. He is the former captain of Black Caps, serving them in all formats. A right handed top order batsman, he has scored 48 centuries—33 in Tests and 15 in ODIs, which is the most scored by a New Zealand cricketer as of March 2025. In January 2015, former New Zealand cricketer Martin Crowe noted that, "we're seeing the dawn of probably our greatest ever batsman" in Williamson.

Williamson made his ODI debut against India in August 2010 and scored his first century two months later when he made 108 against Bangladesh; New Zealand lost the match by nine runs. His 69-ball 100 not out—made against Zimbabwe in October 2011—is the fourth fastest ODI century by a New Zealander. (Note: The top three players are Corey Anderson, Jesse Ryder and Craig McMillan.) His highest score of 148 came against the West Indies in the 2019 World Cup.

Williamson scored a century on his debut Test match against India in November 2010; he was the eighth New Zealander to achieve this feat. His highest score of 251 was made against West Indies at Seddon Park, Hamilton in December 2020. He became the sixth player to score 10 Test centuries before the age of 25 when he made 132 against England at Lord's. (Note: The others were Don Bradman, Neil Harvey, Garfield Sobers and Sachin Tendulkar.) In August 2016, he became the fastest and youngest player to score centuries against all Test-playing nations in the format at the time. (Note: Williamson achieved the feat in 50 matches (91 innings) at the age of 25.) (Note: Since then, Afghanistan and Ireland have acquired Test status.) In March 2023, Kane Williamson scored his 6th Double Century and became the first New Zealand Batter to hit 5, or more double-centuries. As of February 2025, he has the most Test centuries and double centuries for New Zealand. Williamson also ranks fourteenth among cricketers with most centuries in international cricket.

Williamson has played 87 T20Is since his debut in October 2011 and is yet to score a century in the format; his highest score of 95 came against India in January 2020 in a losing cause.

== Key ==
- * – Remained not out
- ‡ – Captain of New Zealand in that match
- † – Man of the match
- (D/L) – Result was determined by the Duckworth–Lewis method

== Test centuries ==
Test centuries scored by Kane Williamson
No.	Score	Against	Pos.	Inn.	Test	Venue	H/A/N	Date	Result	Ref
1	131	India	6	2	1/3	Sardar Patel Stadium, Ahmedabad	Away	4 November 2010	Drawn	
2	102*	South Africa	4	4	3/3	Basin Reserve, Wellington	Home	23 March 2012	Drawn	
3	135	Sri Lanka	3	1	2/2	Paikiasothy Saravanamuttu Stadium, Colombo	Away	25 November 2012	Won	
4	114	Bangladesh	3	1	1/2	Zohur Ahmed Chowdhury Stadium, Chittagong	Away	9 October 2013	Drawn	
5	113	India	3	1	1/2	Eden Park, Auckland	Home	6 February 2014	Won	
6	113	West Indies	3	1	1/3	Sabina Park, Kingston	Away	8 June 2014	Won	
7	161* †	West Indies	3	3	3/3	Kensington Oval, Bridgetown	Away	23 June 2014	Won	
8	192	Pakistan	3	2	3/3	Sharjah Cricket Stadium, Sharjah	Neutral	26 November 2014	Won	
9	242* †	Sri Lanka	3	3	2/2	Basin Reserve, Wellington	Home	3 January 2015	Won	
10	132	England	3	2	1/2	Lord's, London	Away	21 May 2015	Lost	
11	140	Australia	3	2	1/3	The Gabba, Brisbane	Away	5 November 2015	Lost	
12	166	Australia	3	2	2/3	WACA Ground, Perth	Away	13 November 2015	Drawn	
13	108* †	Sri Lanka	3	4	2/2	Seddon Park, Hamilton	Home	18 December 2015	Won	
14	113 † ‡	Zimbabwe	3	1	2/2	Queens Sports Club, Bulawayo	Away	6 August 2016	Won	
15	104* ‡	Bangladesh	3	4	1/2	Basin Reserve, Wellington	Home	12 January 2017	Won	
16	130 ‡	South Africa	3	2	1/3	University of Otago Oval, Dunedin	Home	8 March 2017	Drawn	
17	176 † ‡	South Africa	3	2	3/3	Seddon Park, Hamilton	Home	25 March 2017	Drawn	
18	102 ‡	England	3	2	1/2	Eden Park, Auckland	Home	22 March 2018	Won	
19	139 † ‡	Pakistan	3	3	3/3	Sheikh Zayed Cricket Stadium, Abu Dhabi	Neutral	3 December 2018	Won	
20	200* † ‡	Bangladesh	3	2	1/3	Seddon Park, Hamilton	Home	28 February 2019	Won	
21	104* ‡	England	3	3	2/2	Seddon Park, Hamilton	Home	29 November 2019	Drawn	
22	251 † ‡	West Indies	3	1	1/2	Seddon Park, Hamilton	Home	3 December 2020	Won	
23	129 † ‡	Pakistan	3	1	1/2	Bay Oval, Mount Maunganui	Home	26 December 2020	Won	
24	238 ‡	Pakistan	3	2	2/2	Hagley Oval, Christchurch	Home	3 January 2021	Won	
25	200* †	Pakistan	3	2	1/2	National Bank Cricket Arena, Karachi	Away	26 December 2022	Drawn	
26	132 †	England	3	3	2/2	Basin Reserve, Wellington	Home	24 February 2023	Won	
27	121*	Sri Lanka	3	4	1/2	Hagley Oval, Christchurch	Home	9 March 2023	Won	
28	215	Sri Lanka	3	1	2/2	Basin Reserve, Wellington	Home	17 March 2023	Won	
29	104	Bangladesh	3	2	1/2	Sylhet International Cricket Stadium, Sylhet	Away	29 November 2023	Lost	
30	118	South Africa	3	1	1/2	Bay Oval, Mount Maunganui	Home	4 February 2024	Won	
31	109	South Africa	3	3	1/2	Bay Oval, Mount Maunganui	Home	4 February 2024	Won	
32	133*	South Africa	3	4	2/2	Seddon Park, Hamilton	Home	13 February 2024	Won	
33	156	England	3	3	3/3	Seddon Park, Hamilton	Home	14 December 2024	Won	

== One Day International centuries ==
ODI centuries scored by Kane Williamson
No.	Score	Against	Pos.	Inn.	S/R	Venue	H/A/N	Date	Result	Ref
1	108	Bangladesh	5	2	81.81	Sher-e-Bangla National Cricket Stadium, Dhaka	Away	14 October 2010	Lost	
2	100*	Zimbabwe	6	1	144.92	Queens Sports Club, Bulawayo	Away	25 October 2011	Lost	
3	145* †	South Africa	3	1	106.61	De Beers Diamond Oval, Kimberley	Away	22 January 2013	Won	
4	123 † ‡	Pakistan	3	1	117.14	Sheikh Zayed Cricket Stadium, Abu Dhabi	Neutral	17 December 2014	Won	
5	103 †	Sri Lanka	3	2	96.26	Saxton Oval, Nelson	Home	20 January 2015	Won	
6	112 †	Pakistan	3	1	127.27	McLean Park, Napier	Home	3 February 2015	Won	
7	118 †	England	3	2	104.42	Rose Bowl, Southampton	Away	14 June 2015	Won	
8	118 † ‡	India	3	1	92.18	Feroz Shah Kotla Ground, Delhi	Away	20 October 2016	Won	
9	100 ‡	Australia	3	1	103.09	Edgbaston Cricket Ground, Birmingham	Neutral	2 June 2017	No result	
10	115 † ‡	Pakistan	3	1	98.29	Basin Reserve, Wellington	Home	6 January 2018	Won (D/L)	
11	112* ‡	England	3	2	78.32	Westpac Stadium, Wellington	Home	3 March 2018	Lost	
12	106* † ‡	South Africa	3	2	76.81	Edgbaston Cricket Ground, Birmingham	Neutral	19 June 2019	Won	
13	148 † ‡	West Indies	3	1	96.10	Old Trafford Cricket Ground, Manchester	Neutral	22 June 2019	Won	
14	133* †	South Africa	3	2	117.69	Gaddafi Stadium, Lahore	Neutral	10 February 2025	Won	
15	102	South Africa	3	1	108.51	Gaddafi Stadium, Lahore	Neutral	5 March 2025	Won	
