= Kane Williamson =

New Zealand cricketer (born 1990)

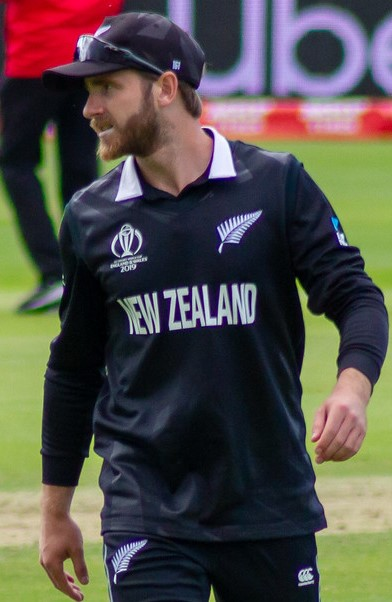
- Williamson during 2019 Cricket World Cup

Personal information
- Full name: Kane Stuart Williamson
- Born: 8 August 1990 (age 36); Tauranga, New Zealand
- Height: 172 cm (5 ft 8 in)
- Batting: Right-handed
- Bowling: Right-arm off-break
- Role: Top-order batter

International information
- National side: New Zealand (2010–2026)
- Test debut (cap 248): 4 November 2010 v India
- Last Test: 4 June 2026 v England
- ODI debut (cap 161): 10 August 2010 v India
- Last ODI: 29 October 2025 v England
- ODI shirt no.: 22
- T20I debut (cap 49): 16 October 2011 v Zimbabwe
- Last T20I: 17 June 2024 v Papua New Guinea
- T20I shirt no.: 22

Domestic team information
- Years: Team
- 2007/08–present: Northern Districts
- 2011–2012: Gloucestershire
- 2013–2018: Yorkshire
- 2015–2022: Sunrisers Hyderabad
- 2017: Barbados Tridents
- 2023–2024: Gujarat Titans
- 2025–2026: Durban's Super Giants
- 2025: Karachi Kings
- 2025: Middlesex
- 2025: London Spirit
- 2026: Rajshahi Warriors

Career statistics
Competition	Test	ODI	T20I	FC
Matches	110	175	93	182
Runs scored	9,515	7,256	2,575	14,677
Batting average	54.06	48.69	33.44	50.96
100s/50s	33/38	15/47	0/18	45/66
Top score	251	148	95	284*
Balls bowled	2,151	1,467	118	6,624
Wickets	30	37	6	86
Bowling average	40.23	35.40	27.33	43.26
5 wickets in innings	0	0	0	1
10 wickets in match	0	0	0	0
Best bowling	4/44	4/22	2/16	5/75
Catches/stumpings	96/–	76/–	45/–	162/–
Medal record
Men's cricket
Representing New Zealand
ICC Cricket World Cup
Runner-up	2015 Australia & New Zealand
Runner-up	2019 England & Wales
ICC T20I World Cup
Runner-up	2021 UAE & Oman
ICC World Test Championship
Winner	2019–2021
ICC Champions Trophy
Runner-up	2025 Pakistan
- Source: ESPNcricinfo, 7 June 2026

Kane Stuart Williamson (born 8 August 1990) is a New Zealand former international cricketer who captained the New Zealand national cricket team in all formats of the game. A right-handed batsman and an occasional off spin bowler, Williamson is the leading run-scorer for New Zealand in Test cricket and is widely regarded as one of the world's best contemporary batsmen and one of the greatest New Zealand captains and batsmen of all time. He captained New Zealand to victory in the 2021 ICC World Test Championship final and to the finals of the 2019 Cricket World Cup and 2021 T20 World Cup. He was also a part of the New Zealand squad to finish as runners-up at the 2015 Cricket World Cup and the 2025 ICC Champions Trophy. Williamson retired from international cricket on 12 June 2026.

Williamson made his first-class cricket debut while still a schoolboy at Tauranga Boys' College, in December 2007. He made his U-19 debut against the touring Indian U-19 team the same year and was named captain of the New Zealand U-19 team for the 2008 U-19 Cricket World Cup. He made his international debut in 2010. Williamson has represented New Zealand at the 2011, 2015, 2019 and 2023 editions of the Cricket World Cup and 2012, 2014, 2016, 2021, 2022 and 2024 editions of the ICC World Twenty20. He made his full-time captaincy debut for New Zealand in the 2016 ICC World Twenty20 in India. He captained New Zealand at the 2019 Cricket World Cup, leading the team to the final and winning the Player of the Tournament award in the process. On 31 December 2020, he reached a Test batting rating of 890, surpassing Steve Smith and Joe Root as the number one ranked Test batsmen in the world. He was nominated for the Sir Garfield Sobers Award for ICC Male Cricketer of the Decade, and the award for Test cricketer of the decade. Ian Chappell and Martin Crowe have ranked Williamson among the top four Test cricket batsmen, along with Joe Root, Steve Smith, Virat Kohli of the current era.

Williamson was the only New Zealander to be named in the ICC Test Team of the Decade (2011–2020). He won the ICC Spirit of Cricket award in 2018. The late former New Zealand cricketer Martin Crowe noted that "we're seeing the dawn of probably our greatest ever batsman" in Williamson. In June 2021, he captained New Zealand to win the inaugural ICC World Test Championship, the first ICC trophy the team won since winning the 2000 ICC KnockOut Trophy. In November 2021, he led New Zealand to the final of the ICC T20 World Cup. He is widely regarded as one of the greatest batsmen of his generation. Williamson retired from all international cricket on June 12, 2026, with immediate effect, after making 0 and 18 against England at Lords. Speaking on the decision, Williamson said "I've thought about it for a while, but over the last few days it's become clear now is the right time," and "I've always felt a strong drive and hunger for international cricket, and I take pride in knowing I've given it my all in every match I've played for New Zealand. Continuing with anything less wouldn't be right and I feel fortunate to step away on my own terms.

== Early life ==
Williamson was born on 8 August 1990 in Tauranga, in the Bay of Plenty region on the North Island of New Zealand. His father Brett was a sales representative who had played under-17 and club cricket in New Zealand and his mother Sandra had been a representative basketball player. He has a twin brother Logan, who is one minute younger than him. The brothers have three older sisters, Anna, Kylie and Sophie. All three were accomplished volleyball players, and Anna and Sophie were in New Zealand age group teams. Williamson's grandmother Joan Williamson-Orr served as mayor of Taupō. His first cousin Dane Cleaver has also played international cricket for New Zealand.

Williamson played senior representative cricket at the age of 14 and first-class cricket at 16. He attended Tauranga Boys' College from 2004 to 2008, where he was head boy in his final year. He was coached by Pacey Depina who described Williamson as having "a thirst to be phenomenal – but not at anyone else's expense." He reportedly scored 40 centuries before he left school.

== Domestic career ==
=== Northern Districts ===
Williamson made his debut for Northern Districts in 2007 at the age of 17, who he has remained with for the duration of his New Zealand domestic career. He scored his first T20 hundred, on 19 September 2014, making 101* in 49 balls to guide Northern Districts to a comfortable win against Cape Cobras in Champions League Twenty20 2014.

=== English county cricket ===
Williamson signed for Gloucestershire to play in the 2011 English county season. On 14 August 2013, he signed for Yorkshire for the rest of the season and subsequently signed to return for the 2014 season, when his team won the County Championship. He signed to return the latter part of the 2015 season, but when incumbent overseas player Aaron Finch was not selected for the Australia ODI squad, Yorkshire ultimately chose to extend Finch's deal in place of Williamson. He subsequently signed a deal for part of the 2016 season, and also returned for a part of the 2018 season.

In 2025, Middlesex announced that they would be signing him for the upcoming 2025 season, as well as playing for the London Spirit.

=== Indian Premier League ===
In February 2015, a Williamson signed for Indian Premier League team Sunrisers Hyderabad (SRH). He played for the team in the 2016 season, winning the title, and was retained for the 2017 and 2018 seasons. He captained the team in 2018, replacing David Warner. Under Williamson's captaincy, Sunrisers Hyderabad finished runners-up and he was the season's leading scorer with 735 runs. In IPL 2021, Kane took over the captaincy from David Warner in the middle of the season. He was retained by the franchise for the 2022 edition as the captain, but failed to perform, scoring one half-century. Ahead of the 2023 season, he was bought by the Gujarat Titans, but was injured in the first match of the season. He would go on to play for the Titans for the 2024 season before being released and would remain unsold for the 2025 season.

=== The Hundred ===
==== Birmingham Phoenix ====
In the 2021 The Hundred season, Williamson was drafted for Birmingham Phoenix but withdrew because of an ongoing elbow injury.

==== London Spirit ====
In The Hundred 2025, Williamson became the first male to become a direct signing for London Spirit. He becomes the captain of the Spirit as well as playing for the host county Middlesex. He played all 8 games for Spirit, scoring 204 runs as the team won just 3 games, failing to qualify for the playoffs.

=== Other Tournaments ===
Williamson has featured in several T20 franchise leagues around the world.

He played for Gloucestershire in the Friends Life t20 in 2011 and 2012, scoring 324 runs across 17 matches.

He later represented Yorkshire in the NatWest T20 Blast in 2014 and 2016, amassing 302 runs in 12 matches at a strike rate of 118.89. He returned to the Vitality Blast with Yorkshire in 2018 and joined Middlesex for the 2025 season. As of August 2025, he had made 24 appearances in the competition, scoring 676 runs.

In other T20 leagues, Williamson played for the Barbados Tridents in the 2017 Caribbean Premier League, scoring 172 runs without any half-centuries or centuries.

He featured in the third season of the SA20 for Durban's Super Giants in January and February 2025, scoring 233 runs in 8 matches at an average of 46.60 and a strike rate of 118.87. Williamson returned to Durban's Super Giants in the 2026 SA20 season, replacing Taijul Islam. He went on to play 7 matches as the team finished 5th and he scored just 110 runs the whole season.

Williamson has also won two major franchise T20 titles. He was part of the Sunrisers Hyderabad squad that won the 2016 Indian Premier League title. Most recently, in January 2026, he joined the Rajshahi Warriors in the 12th edition of the Bangladesh Premier League. He contributed key performances—including an unbeaten 45* off 38 balls in Qualifier 2 and 24 off 15 balls in the final (adding a partnership with centurion Tanzid Hasan)—to help the team reach and win both playoff matches, defeating Sylhet Titans in Qualifier 2 and Chattogram Royals by 63 runs in the final to secure their maiden BPL title.

== International career ==
Williamson was 17, when he led the New Zealand Under-19 team in the World Cup in Malaysia in 2008. New Zealand reached the semi-final, where they lost to the eventual champions India. On 24 March 2010, Williamson was named in the New Zealand Test squad for the second Test against Australia, but ultimately he did not play in the match.

Williamson made his One-Day International debut against India on 10 August 2010. He was dismissed for a 9th ball duck. In his second match, he was bowled by Angelo Mathews for a second ball duck. He scored his maiden ODI century against Bangladesh on 14 October 2010 in Dhaka and hence became the youngest centurion in New Zealand's cricket history. Due to his performance on the Bangladesh tour where New Zealand suffered a 4–0 whitewash, Williamson was selected in the New Zealand Test squad for the tour of India that followed.

Williamson made his Test cricket debut against India at Ahmedabad on 4 November 2010. In his first innings he scored 131 runs off 299 balls and became the eighth New Zealand player to score a century on Test debut.

=== Rising through the ranks ===
Williamson scored 161* against West Indies in June 2014, his second century of the series and helped secure a rare away Test series victory for his team. He finished as the leading overall run scorer in the series with 413 runs, and was denied a double century only by rain, which encouraged skipper Brendon McCullum to declare in the interest of obtaining a result in the match. He was also reported for a suspect bowling action in April 2014, but was cleared in December 2014. He was also named as captain ahead of the ODI and Twenty20 series against Pakistan in December 2014 as McCullum was rested.

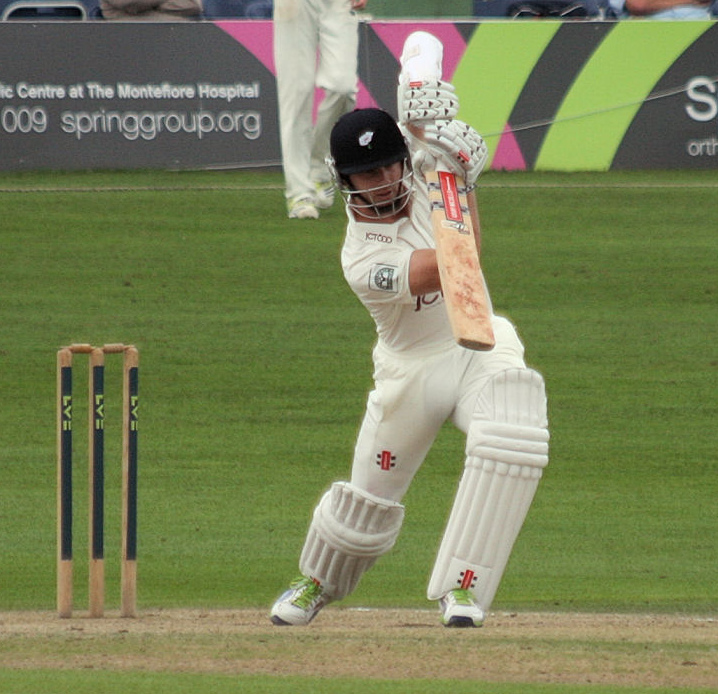
Williamson batting against Sussex in 2013

Williamson scored 100* off 69 balls against Zimbabwe at Bulawayo, which at the time was the second fastest century by a New Zealander in a One-Day International. He also established one of the most potent top-order partnership with Ross Taylor, with Williamson himself being the most prolific number-three batsman for the national team since former captain Stephen Fleming. As a fielder, his position is predominantly at gully.

In 2015, he started with 69 and 242* against Sri Lanka, with two catches in the field in a man-of-the-match performance. On 3 February 2015, he scored the 99th ODI century in the New Zealand's history, against Pakistan; Ross Taylor scored the 100th in the same match. He also scored over 700 runs before the 2015 Cricket World Cup in the first two months of the calendar year. On 17 June 2015 he became the fifth-fastest batsmen and fastest New Zealander to score 3,000 runs, getting them in just 78 innings. On 15 November 2015 Williamson and Taylor became the first pair of away batsmen to each score 2nd innings centuries at WACA Ground in Perth.

In December 2015, during the second Test against Sri Lanka, Williamson broke the record for the most Test runs scored in a calendar year by a New Zealander, with 1172 runs. He also ended 2015 with 2692 runs, the highest total across all forms of international cricket for the year, and third highest total in a single year.

He was awarded the T20 Player of the Year by NZC for the 2014–15 season.

=== Captaincy ===
In March 2016, Williamson assumed the position of captain of New Zealand across all forms of cricket after the retirement of Brendon McCullum, beginning with the World T20I cup in India. He was named as captain of the 'Team of the Tournament' by ESPNcricinfo and Cricbuzz. He also picked up NZ player of the year, Test player of the year and the Redpath Cup for top batsman in first class cricket for the second year in a row.

In August 2016, during the Test series against Zimbabwe, Williamson became the thirteenth batsman to score a century against all the other Test playing nations. He completed this in the fewest innings, the quickest time from his Test debut and became the youngest player to achieve this feat.

Williamson set a new record for scoring the most centuries by a New Zealand batsman in Tests, with his 18th, in March 2018 when he score 102 against England at Auckland. Later that year, he scored his 10,000th run in first-class cricket, batting for the English team Yorkshire in the 2018 County Championship. On 8 December 2018, he scored his 19th Test century in the deciding 3rd game in the Pakistan away series. On 7 December 2018, Williamson became the first player from New Zealand to cross 900 rating points in the ICC Test batting rankings. During the 2019 Test series against Bangladesh, Williamson scored 200 not out as New Zealand posted a team total of 715, their highest ever in a Test innings. He also became the fastest New Zealand player to score 6,000 runs in Test cricket.

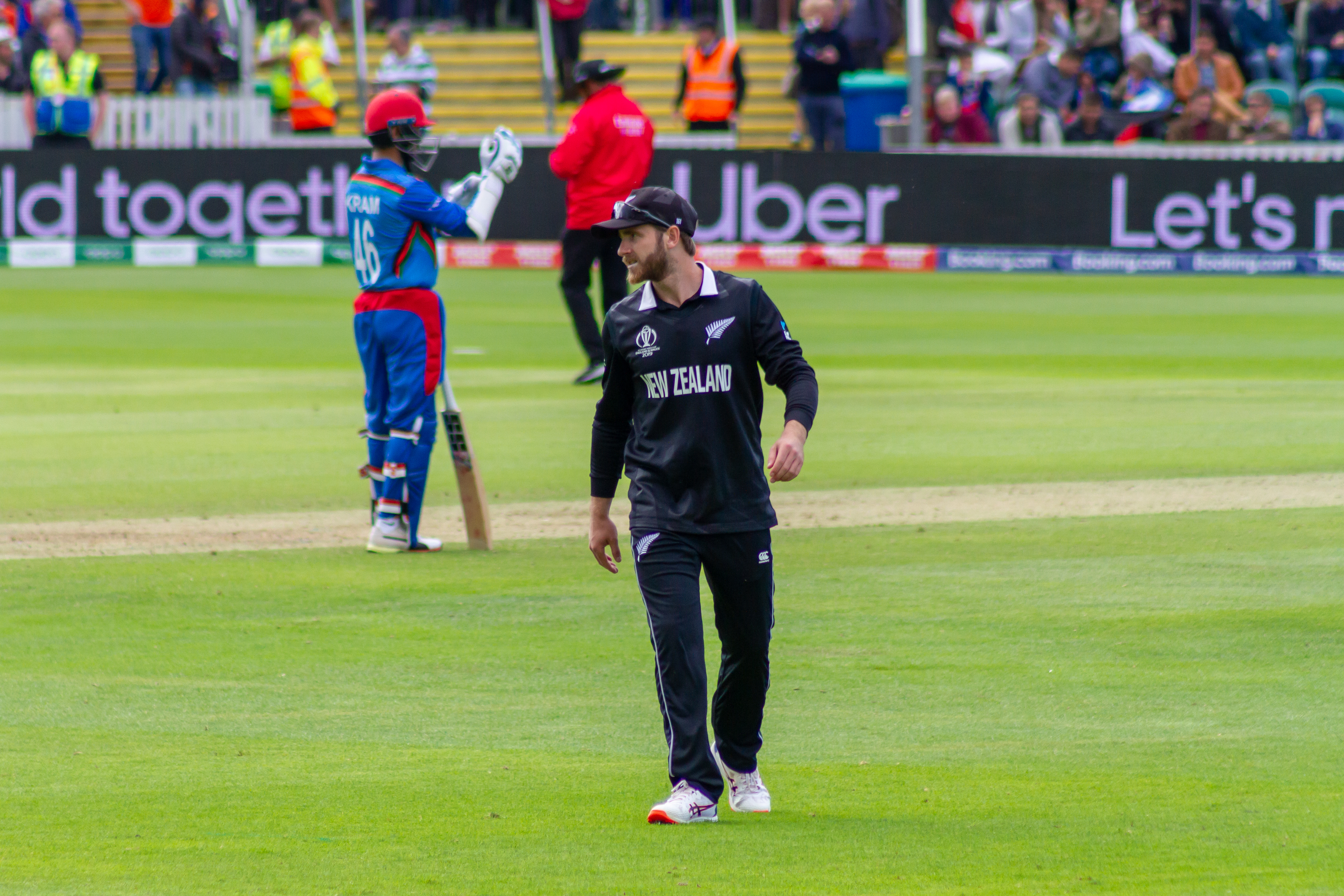
Kane Williamson in Cricket World Cup 2019

In April 2019, he was named the captain of New Zealand's squad for the 2019 Cricket World Cup. During the tournament, he scored an unbeaten 106 to guide New Zealand to victory over South Africa, scoring his 3,000th run as captain of New Zealand in ODIs in the process. On 22 June, Williamson scored 148 runs off 154 balls in a 5-run victory over West Indies, his career best score in ODI cricket. One week later, in the match against Australia, Williamson became the third-fastest batsman, in terms of innings, to score 6,000 runs in ODIs, doing so in his 139th innings. At the end of the World Cup, he was awarded the Player of the Tournament award after becoming the highest scoring captain in a single World Cup, making 578 runs in 10 matches. He was named as captain of the 'Team of the Tournament' by the ICC and ESPNcricinfo.

In November 2020, Williamson was nominated for the Sir Garfield Sobers Award for ICC Men's Cricketer of the Decade, and the award for Test cricketer of the decade. On 4 December, Williamson scored 251 runs, his highest test score, in the first innings of the first Test against West Indies and helped New Zealand win the match by an innings and 134 runs.

In June 2021, he led New Zealand to victory in the inaugural ICC World Test Championship, beating India in the final by eight wickets. In August 2021, Williamson was named as the captain of New Zealand's squad for the 2021 ICC Men's T20 World Cup. Under his captaincy, New Zealand reached their third consecutive ICC event final across all formats after beating England in the semi-final of the T20 World Cup. In the final, Williamson scored a brilliant knock of 85 off 48 balls but ended up on the losing team after facing defeat to Australia by 8 wickets. He was New Zealand's top scorer in the tournament with 216 runs at an average of 43.20.

=== Post-captaincy ===
In December 2022, Williamson stepped down as New Zealand's Test captain, ahead of their tour to Pakistan. In the first Test, he scored his fifth double century in Tests, and became the first New Zealand batter to hit five double centuries in Test cricket. He also became the first New Zealand batter to achieve the milestone of 25 centuries in Test cricket.

On 28 February 2023, Williamson surpassed Ross Taylor's tally of 7,683 runs to become New Zealand's highest run scorer in Test cricket, on the same day he also scored his 26th Test century against England in the second Test of the two match Test series.

On 18 March 2023, Williamson scored his 28th century in test cricket. He went on to turn the innings into his 6th test match double century.

In May 2024, he was named captain of New Zealand’s squad for the 2024 ICC Men's T20 World Cup tournament. In June 2024, he stepped down from white-ball captaincy following New Zealand's group-stage exit from the T20 World Cup.

On 10 February 2025, Williamson scored his 14th ODI century, his first since 22 June 2019, a span of 2060 days. Williamson would go on to score 200 runs in the 2025 Champions Trophy, making a contribution to New Zealand's run to the final where they would lose to India.

=== T20I Retirement and later career ===
On 2 November 2025, he announced his retirement from T20I cricket to focus on Test cricket.

=== International Retirement ===
On 12 June 2026, Williamson announced his retirement from all international cricket, having previously retired from T20 Internationals in late 2025. Explaining his reasons behind the decision, Williamson said "I've thought about it for a while, but over the last few days it's become clear now is the right time," and "I've always felt a strong drive and hunger for international cricket, and I take pride in knowing I've given it my all in every match I've played for New Zealand. Continuing with anything less wouldn't be right and I feel fortunate to step away on my own terms. The decision came after he made just 0 and 18 at Lords against England, and means that he ended his career with 9515 runs in Test Cricket, the most of any Kiwi, and just 485 short of the magical 10000 run mark. Williamson also finished on 7256 One Day International runs and 2575 T20 International runs, finishing his international career on 19346 runs.

== International centuries ==
As of March 2025, Williamson has scored 33 Test and 15 ODI centuries. His highest score in Test is 251 and 148 in ODIs. He retired without scoring a century in T20Is, his highest in that format being 95.

== Personal life ==
He bowls and bats right handed but writes left handed. Williamson has three children, two daughters and a son with wife Sarah Raheem whom he first met in 2015. During the New Zealand vs Pakistan 2014 ODI series, Williamson donated his entire match fee for all five ODIs to the victims of the 2014 Peshawar school massacre.

Awards
Preceded by Brendon McCullum	New Zealand's Sportsman of the Year; 2015; 2021	Succeeded by Mahé Drysdale
Preceded by Israel Adesanya	New Zealand's Sportsman of the Year; 2015; 2021	Succeeded by Nico Porteous
Preceded by Mitchell Starc	ICC Cricket World Cup Player of the Series; 2019	Incumbent
