= George Worker =

New Zealand cricketer

Personal information
- Full name: George Herrick Worker
- Born: 23 August 1989 (age 37); Palmerston North, New Zealand
- Height: 6 ft 2 in (1.88 m)
- Batting: Left-handed
- Bowling: Slow left-arm orthodox
- Role: All-Rounder
- Relatives: Rupert Worker (great-uncle)

International information
- National side: New Zealand (2015–2018)
- ODI debut (cap 188): 23 August 2015 v South Africa
- Last ODI: 11 November 2018 v Pakistan
- ODI shirt no.: 64
- T20I debut (cap 67): 9 August 2015 v Zimbabwe
- Last T20I: 14 August 2015 v South Africa
- T20I shirt no.: 64

Domestic team information
- Years: Team
- 2007/08–2010/11: Central Districts (squad no. 33)
- 2011/12–2013/14: Canterbury
- 2011: Scotland
- 2014/15–2020/21: Central Districts
- 2019: Jamaica Tallawahs
- 2021/22–2023/24: Auckland

Career statistics
Competition	ODI	T20I	FC	LA
Matches	10	2	126	169
Runs scored	272	90	6,400	6,721
Batting average	34.00	45.00	29.49	43.64
100s/50s	0/3	0/1	11/33	18/37
Top score	58	62	210	194
Balls bowled	6	12	6,786	2,484
Wickets	0	1	58	60
Bowling average	–	19.00	67.32	38.78
5 wickets in innings	–	0	0	0
10 wickets in match	–	0	0	0
Best bowling	–	1/19	4/58	4/22
Catches/stumpings	5/–	1/–	115/–	57/–
- Source: Cricinfo, 14 August 2024

George Herrick Worker (born 23 August 1989) is a New Zealand former international cricketer. He was named in New Zealand's squad for their tour to Zimbabwe in August 2015, after Mitchell Santner was ruled out due to injury. He made his Twenty20 International debut for New Zealand on 9 August 2015. He made his One Day International debut for New Zealand against South Africa on 23 August 2015. On 13 August 2024, he was announced his retirement from professional cricket at the age of 34 to take up an opportunity with an investment services firm.

== Domestic and franchise career ==
He made his first class debut scoring 71 runs opening the batting for Central Districts in December 2007. He captained the Palmerston North Boys High School, the same school Jacob Oram had attended, first eleven for two years. He has represented the Central Districts Under 19 side. He skippered the New Zealand Under-19s, featured in the ICC Under-19 World Cup in Malaysia then toured England in 2008.

A genuine all-rounder who bats in the top order and bowls left-arm spin, Worker made his first-class debut for Central Districts in December 2007, hitting 71 on debut. He played over 80 matches across all three formats for the Stags, including the 2010 Champions League tournament in South Africa, before switching to the Canterbury Wizards for the 2011/12 season, where he has recently posted his maiden first-class hundred (120*) against Auckland Aces.

In 2010/11 Worker enjoyed his best season on the domestic circuit in all formats. He hit 335 runs at 30.45, with three fifties in the first-class arena, then an impressive 307 runs at 51.16 including his maiden hundred in domestic cricket. In the T20 format, 207 runs at 25.87 and 4 wickets at 10, with an economy rate of 5.71 pushed his name forward for international consideration.

Worker, has not only played Under-19 cricket for New Zealand, but featured for the national Emerging Players side against the touring England Lions in 2009. Later that year, he was part of the same side that played in the Cricket Australia Emerging Players Tournament in Brisbane.

He has also just returned from a success stint abroad, where he played league cricket in Scotland for Stewart's Melville Royal High Cricket Club which culminated in playing in the CB40 competition for Scotland. He was the leading run-scorer for the team in two of his three fixtures.

In the 2016–17 Ford Trophy, Worker scored the most runs in the tournament, with 659 in ten matches.

On 3 June 2018, he was selected to play for the Montreal Tigers in the players' draft for the inaugural edition of the Global T20 Canada tournament.

In October 2020, in the second round of the 2020–21 Plunket Shield season, Worker played in his 100th first-class match. In January 2021, in the 2020–21 Super Smash, Worker scored his first century in T20 cricket.

== International career ==
Worker was named in 12-men New Zealand's squad for their tour to Zimbabwe in August 2015, after Mitchell Santner was ruled out due to injury. His first international appearance came during the single Twenty20 International on 9 August 2015. He top scored in the match with 62 runs off 38 balls and was the player of the match.

In November 2017, he was added to New Zealand's Test squad for their series against the West Indies.

In May 2018, he was one of twenty players to be awarded a new contract for the 2018–19 season by New Zealand Cricket.
