= Ben Wheeler (cricketer) =

New Zealand cricketer (born 1991)

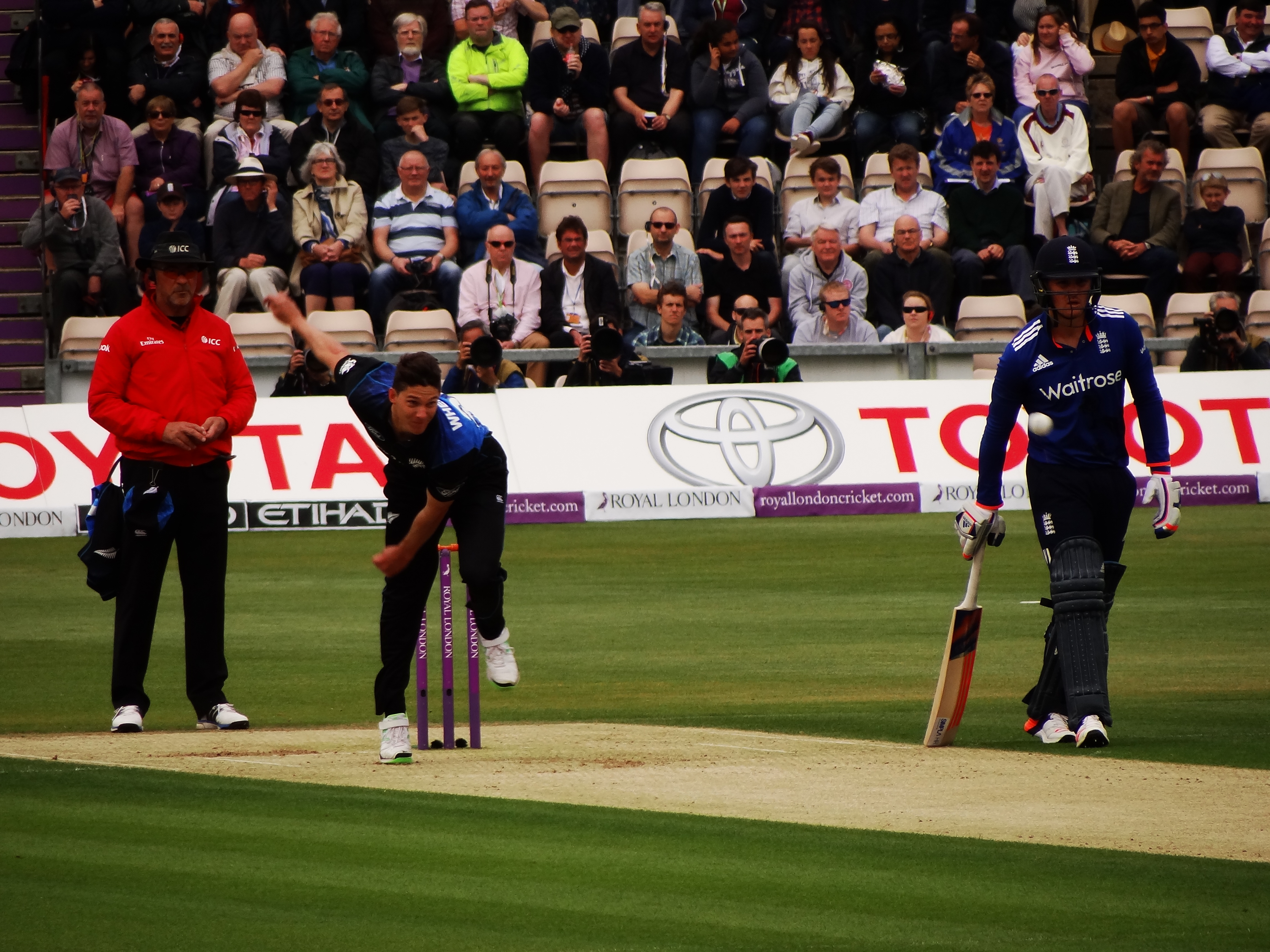
- Wheeler in 2015 playing against England

Personal information
- Full name: Ben Matthew Wheeler
- Born: 10 November 1991 (age 35); Blenheim, New Zealand
- Batting: Right-handed
- Bowling: Left-arm medium-fast
- Role: Bowling all-rounder

International information
- National side: New Zealand (2015–2017)
- ODI debut (cap 185): 14 June 2015 v England
- Last ODI: 26 August 2015 v South Africa
- ODI shirt no.: 25
- T20I debut (cap 72): 3 January 2017 v Bangladesh
- Last T20I: 17 February 2017 v South Africa
- T20I shirt no.: 25

Domestic team information
- Years: Team
- 2009/10–2021/22: Central Districts (squad no. 10)

Career statistics
| Competition | ODI | T20I | FC | LA |
|---|---|---|---|---|
| Matches | 6 | 6 | 42 | 39 |
| Runs scored | 58 | 37 | 854 | 436 |
| Batting average | – | 18.50 | 19.40 | 24.22 |
| 100s/50s | 0/0 | 0/0 | 0/6 | 0/3 |
| Top score | 39* | 30 | 81* | 80* |
| Balls bowled | 309 | 128 | 7.085 | 1,810 |
| Wickets | 8 | 7 | 121 | 49 |
| Bowling average | 39.37 | 30.85 | 28.69 | 33.79 |
| 5 wickets in innings | 0 | 0 | 3 | 0 |
| 10 wickets in match | 0 | 0 | 0 | 0 |
| Best bowling | 3/63 | 2/16 | 6/60 | 4/24 |
| Catches/stumpings | 1/– | 1/– | 22/– | 10/– |
- Source: ESPNcricinfo, 26 April 2022

Ben Matthew Wheeler (born 10 November 1991) is a New Zealand former international cricketer who played limited over cricket for the national side. He made his One Day International debut against England on 14 June 2015.

== Domestic career ==
Wheeler played for Central Districts in the Plunket Shield and Marlborough in the Hawke Cup. He is the grandson of Ray Dowker who played for the Canterbury Wizards in the Plunket Shield, and the younger brother of Otago Highlanders lock, Joe Wheeler.

In June 2018, he was awarded a contract with Central Districts for the 2018–19 season. He was the leading wicket-taker for Central Districts in the 2018–19 Ford Trophy, with ten dismissals in four matches.

== International career ==
Wheeler was part of the New Zealand squad for the 2010 Under 19 Cricket World Cup.

Wheeler was called up to New Zealand ODI squad in 2015 after the World Cup. Wheeler made his debut in the third ODI against England picking up 3/63 in his 10 overs. On 3 January 2017 he made his T20I debut for New Zealand against Bangladesh.
