= 2019–20 Plunket Shield season =

Cricket tournament

2019–20 Plunket Shield
- Dates: 21 October 2019 – 29 March 2020
- Cricket format: First-class
- Tournament format: Round-robin
- Champions: Wellington (21st title)
- Participants: 6
- Matches: 24
- Most runs: Devon Conway (701)
- Most wickets: Jacob Duffy (22); Neil Wagner (22)

The 2019–20 Plunket Shield was the 94th season of the Plunket Shield, the domestic first-class cricket competition in New Zealand. It took place between October 2019 and March 2020. As per the previous edition of the competition, the tournament was scheduled to feature eight rounds of matches.

In round two of the tournament, Michael Snedden became the first fourth-generation cricketer to play first-class cricket in New Zealand, when he made his debut for Wellington. In round five, Mark Chapman and Joe Carter scored centuries in both innings for Auckland, the first time that two batsman had scored a century in each innings in the same match in the Plunket Shield.

On 16 March 2020, the final two rounds of the tournament were cancelled, due to the COVID-19 pandemic. New Zealand Cricket announced that Wellington had won the tournament. It was Wellington's 21st title, and their first since the 2003–04 season.

== Points table ==
Team	Pld	W	L	D	Ab	Pts
Wellington	6	4	1	1	0	83
Central Districts	6	2	3	1	0	57
Otago	6	2	1	2	0	55
Auckland	6	2	1	2	1	54
Canterbury	6	1	3	2	0	45
Northern Districts	6	1	3	2	0	42

Champions

== Fixtures ==
=== Round 1 ===
21–24 October 2019
Scorecard

Otago	v	Wellington
199 (63.2 overs); Mitch Renwick 42 (68); Logan van Beek 4/43 (16 overs)		372 (96.3 overs); Devon Conway 96 (180); Jacob Duffy 7/89 (24 overs)
219 (66.2 overs); Dean Foxcroft 54 (78); Malcolm Nofal 4/15 (9.2 overs)		50/2 (11.1 overs); Rachin Ravindra 26* (35); Jacob Duffy 2/17 (6 overs)

Wellington won by 8 wickets
Basin Reserve, Wellington
Umpires: Billy Bowden and Ashley Mehrotra

- Wellington won the toss and elected to field.
- Dale Phillips (Otago) made his first-class debut.

21–24 October 2019
Scorecard

Canterbury	v	Northern Districts
390 (121.4 overs); Cole McConchie 107 (152); Trent Boult 3/70 (23 overs)		498/6 (136.1 overs); Daryl Mitchell 170* (264); Will Williams 1/59 (23 overs)

Match drawn
Hagley Oval, Christchurch
Umpires: Shaun Haig and Jacobs

- Canterbury won the toss and elected to bat.

21–24 October 2019
Scorecard

Auckland	v	Central Districts
210 (85.4 overs); Martin Guptill 69 (162); Willem Ludick 3/29 (18 overs)		169 (68.3 overs); Brad Schmulian 74* (129); Matt McEwan 4/51 (21.3 overs)
189/9d (78 overs); Ben Horne 55* (154); Willem Ludick 3/43 (18 overs)		192 (57.5 overs); Dane Cleaver 72 (95); Matt McEwan 4/39 (14.5 overs)

Auckland won by 38 runs
Eden Park Outer Oval, Auckland
Umpires: Wayne Knights and Tim Parlane

- Central Districts won the toss and elected to field.

=== Round 2 ===
29 October – 1 November 2019
Scorecard

Wellington	v	Canterbury
525/7d (118 overs); Devon Conway 327* (352); Matt Henry 3/100 (30 overs)		415/9d (133.2 overs); Tom Latham 224 (381); Michael Bracewell 2/54 (16 overs)
247/6d (44.3 overs); Devon Conway 66 (78); Will Williams 3/40 (11 overs)		313 (74 overs); Matt Henry 43 (40); Malcolm Nofal 4/100 (19 overs)

Wellington won by 44 runs
Basin Reserve, Wellington
Umpires: Derek Walker and Garth Stirrat

- Canterbury won the toss and elected to field.
- Michael Snedden (Wellington) made his first-class debut.
- Devon Conway (Wellington) scored the ninth triple century in first-class cricket in New Zealand, and scored the most runs in a first-class match in New Zealand (393).
- Todd Astle became the first bowler for Canterbury to take 300 first-class wickets.

30 October – 2 November 2019
Scorecard

Otago	v	Auckland

Match abandoned
University Oval, Dunedin
Umpires: Jacobs and John Bromley

- No toss
- No play was possible due to rain.

30 October – 2 November 2019
Scorecard

Central Districts	v	Northern Districts
371 (117.5 overs); George Worker 130 (248); Brett Randell 3/50 (24 overs)		202 (69.1 overs); Brett Randell 56 (97); Seth Rance 3/50 (17 overs)
204 (53.5 overs); Tom Bruce 60 (79); Neil Wagner 5/62 (18.5 overs)		299 (116.3 overs); Bharat Popli 87 (202); Brad Schmulian 4/34 (16.3 overs)

Central Districts won by 74 runs
Bay Oval, Mount Maunganui
Umpires: Billy Bowden and Tim Parlane

- Northern Districts won the toss and elected to field.
- Raymond Toole and Jarrod McKay (Central Districts) both made their first-class debuts.

=== Round 3 ===
8–11 November 2019
Scorecard

Central Districts	v	Canterbury
164 (60.2 overs); Greg Hay 37 (108); Fraser Sheat 4/52 (15 overs)		212 (59.1 overs); Stephen Murdoch 75 (128); Willem Ludick 4/51 (17 overs)
287/9 (102 overs); Ben Smith 82 (175); Matt Henry 3/95 (28 overs)

Match drawn
Saxton Oval, Nelson
Umpires: Billy Bowden and Ashley Mehrotra

- Canterbury won the toss and elected to field.
- Ben Stoyanoff (Central Districts) made his first-class debut.

8–11 November 2019
Scorecard

Wellington	v	Auckland
91 (31.3 overs); Devon Conway 22 (34); Lockie Ferguson 4/23 (9.3 overs)		217 (66.4 overs); Robert O'Donnell 60* (85); Ben Sears 6/43 (13.4 overs)
104/2 (27 overs); Fraser Colson 34 (44); Matt McEwan 1/27 (10 overs)

Match drawn
Basin Reserve, Wellington
Umpires: Derek Walker and Tim Parlane

- Auckland won th toss and elected to field.
- No play was possible on days 3 and 4 due to rain.
- Lockie Ferguson (Auckland) took his 150th first-class wicket.

8–11 November 2019
Scorecard

Northern Districts	v	Otago
243 (82.1 overs); Henry Cooper 149 (239); Michael Rippon 4/60 (25.1 overs)		349 (127.2 overs); Nathan Smith 114 (193); Neil Wagner 6/114 (40.2 overs)
104/6 (61 overs); Henry Cooper 30 (77); Michael Rippon 5/33 (27 overs)

Match drawn
University Oval, Dunedin
Umpires: John Dempsey and John Bromley

- Northern Districts won the toss and elected to bat.
- No play was possible on day 3 due to rain.
- Daniel Flynn (Northern Districts) played in his 100th first-class match.

=== Round 4 ===
22–25 February 2020
Scorecard

Auckland	v	Otago
467/6d (119 overs); Martin Guptill 110 (157); Jacob Duffy 2/88 (28 overs)		281 (97.4 overs); Nick Kelly 118 (228); Louis Delport 5/77 (28 overs)
184/5d (20.5 overs); Jeet Raval 66 (53); Dean Foxcroft 3/25 (4.5 overs)		227/9 (93 overs); Nathan Smith 41* (133); Lockie Ferguson 3/60 (20 overs)

Match drawn
Eden Park Outer Oval, Auckland
Umpires: John Dempsey and Ashley Mehrotra

- Otago won the toss and elected to field.
- Louis Delport (Auckland) took his maiden five-wicket haul in first-class cricket.

22–25 February 2020
Scorecard

Wellington	v	Canterbury
316 (77.1 overs); Michael Bracewell 87 (97); Andrew Hazeldine 4/62 (13.1 overs)		570/8d (154 overs); Leo Carter 226* (367); Iain McPeake 3/80 (23 overs)
120 (34.1 overs); Fraser Colson 44 (60); Theo van Woerkom 2/9 (3 overs)

Canterbury won by an innings and 134 runs
Mainpower Oval, Rangiora
Umpires: Derek Walker and Tim Parlane

- Canterbury won the toss and elected to field.
- Troy Johnson (Wellington) made his first-class debut.
- Leo Carter (Canterbury) scored his maiden double century in first-class cricket.

22–25 February 2020
Scorecard

Northern Districts	v	Central Districts
271 (90.3 overs); Bharat Popli 62 (132); Blair Tickner 4/59 (20 overs)		482 (140.5 overs); Dane Cleaver 201 (223); Mitchell Santner 4/111 (44.5 overs)
283 (104.4 overs); Ish Sodhi 57 (97); Brad Schmulian 3/63 (24 overs)		73/2 (7 overs); Dane Cleaver 38 (18); Brett Randell 1/5 (1 over)

Central Districts won by 8 wickets
McLean Park, Napier
Umpires: Shaun Haig and Donovan Koch

- Central Districts won the toss and elected to field.
- Katene Clarke (Northern Districts) made his first-class debut.

=== Round 5 ===
1–4 March 2020
Scorecard

Otago	v	Canterbury
287 (83.5 overs); Nathan Smith 78 (136); Matt Henry 4/88 (18.5 overs)		145 (58.1 overs); Cam Fletcher 32 (72); Jacob Duffy 3/30 (18 overs)
160 (53.3 overs); Michael Rippon 30 (74); Matt Henry 4/49 (17.3 overs)		240 (65.5 overs); Ken McClure 98 (126); Jacob Duffy 4/46 (17 overs)

Otago won by 62 runs
Queens Park, Invercargill
Umpires: Derek Walker and Tim Parlane

- Otago won the toss and elected to bat.

1–4 March 2020
Scorecard

Northern Districts	v	Auckland
438 (119.4 overs); Joe Carter 169 (244); Ben Lister 2/53 (26 overs)		351/5d (86.2 overs); Mark Chapman 143 (166); James Baker 2/55 (19.2 overs)
283 (74 overs); Joe Carter 120 (197); Sean Solia 4/33 (9 overs)		374/9 (74.5 overs); Mark Chapman 146 (186); James Baker 4/83 (20 overs)

Auckland won by 1 wicket
Eden Park Outer Oval, Auckland
Umpires: Wayne Knights and Ashley Mehrotra

- Auckland won the toss and elected to field.
- Mark Chapman and Joe Carter (Auckland) scored centuries in both innings, the first time that two batsman had scored a century in each innings in the same match in the Plunket Shield.

1–4 March 2020
Scorecard

Central Districts	v	Wellington
96 (36.4 overs); Greg Hay 62 (110); James Neesham 3/17 (9.4 overs)		298 (99 overs); Michael Bracewell 70 (156); Blair Tickner 5/96 (27 overs)
254 (73.1 overs); Brad Schmulian 68* (77); Jamie Gibson 3/36 (11 overs)		53/1 (16.2 overs); Devon Conway 19* (31); Willem Ludick 1/24 (4.2 overs)

Wellington won by 9 wickets
Basin Reserve, Wellington
Umpires: Billy Bowden and John Dempsey

- Wellington won the toss and elected to field.
- Stefan Hook-Sporry (Central Districts) made his first-class debut.

=== Round 6 ===
10–13 March 2020
Scorecard

Northern Districts	v	Canterbury
294 (88.3 overs); Scott Kuggeleijn 72* (85); Will Williams 4/52 (26 overs)		243 (86.4 overs); Stephen Murdoch 56 (123); James Baker 5/59 (26.4 overs)
302/5d (74 overs); Henry Cooper 130 (211); Theo van Woerkom 4/76 (21 overs)		172 (63.3 overs); Stephen Murdoch 55 (101); Joe Walker 5/41 (18.3 overs)

Northern Districts won by 181 runs
Seddon Park, Hamilton
Umpires: John Dempsey and Wayne Knights

- Canterbury won the toss and elected to field.

10–13 March 2020
Scorecard

Central Districts	v	Otago
297 (82.2 overs); Greg Hay 83 (131); Michael Rae 2/63 (20 overs)		266/7d (76 overs); Mitch Renwick 74* (116); Ajaz Patel 4/87 (26 overs)
256/2d (43 overs); Will Young 133* (118); Nathan Smith 1/50 (11 overs)		291/7 (75 overs); Michael Rippon 95* (111); Ajaz Patel 3/97 (26 overs)

Otago won by 3 wickets
University Oval, Dunedin
Umpires: Shaun Haig and Derek Walker

- Otago won the toss and elected to field.
- No play was possible on day 1 due to rain.

10–13 March 2020
Scorecard

Auckland	v	Wellington
179 (55.3 overs); Sean Solia 69 (81); Michael Snedden 3/42 (13 overs)		360 (153.4 overs); Rachin Ravindra 101 (187); Glenn Phillips 4/87 (51 overs)
174 (83.4 overs); Finn Allen 66 (115); Michael Bracewell 5/43 (29.4 overs)

Wellington won by an innings and 7 runs
Eden Park Outer Oval, Auckland
Umpires: Chris Brown and Ashley Mehrotra

- Auckland won the toss and elected to bat.
- Rachin Ravindra (Wellington) scored his maiden century in first-class cricket.
- Michael Bracewell (Wellington) took his maiden five-wicket haul in first-class cricket.

=== Round 7 ===
18–21 March 2020
Scorecard

Northern Districts	v	Auckland

Match cancelled
Cobham Oval, Whangārei

18–21 March 2020
Scorecard

Canterbury	v	Otago

Match cancelled
Hagley Oval, Christchurch

18–21 March 2020
Scorecard

Central Districts	v	Wellington

Match cancelled
McLean Park, Napier

=== Round 8 ===
26–29 March 2020
Scorecard

Northern Districts	v	Wellington

Match cancelled
Seddon Park, Hamilton

26–29 March 2020
Scorecard

Central Districts	v	Otago

Match cancelled
McLean Park, Napier

26–29 March 2020
Scorecard

Canterbury	v	Auckland

Match cancelled
Mainpower Oval, Rangiora
