= 2019–20 Ford Trophy =

Cricket tournament

- Dates: 17 November 2019 – 16 February 2020
- Administrator(s): New Zealand Cricket
- Cricket format: List A cricket
- Tournament format(s): Round-robin and Knockout
- Champions: Auckland (12th title)
- Participants: 6
- Matches: 32
- Most runs: Devon Conway (553)
- Most wickets: Ben Lister (23)
- Official website: www.blackcaps.co.nz

The 2019–20 Ford Trophy was the 49th season of The Ford Trophy, the List A cricket tournament in New Zealand. It was the ninth in a sponsorship deal between New Zealand Cricket and Ford Motor Company. It took place between November 2019 and February 2020. As per the previous edition of the competition, the tournament featured ten rounds of matches. Wellington were the defending champions.

Following the conclusion of the group stage, Auckland advanced directly to the final, with Canterbury and Otago progressing to the elimination final. In the elimination final, Otago beat Canterbury by six runs to progress to the final. In the final, Auckland beat Otago by two wickets to win the tournament.

== Points table ==
Pos	Team	Pld	W	L	NR	BP	Pts	NRR
1	Auckland	10	6	4	0	4	28	0.462
2	Canterbury	10	5	4	1	3	25	0.084
3	Otago	10	5	4	1	2	24	0.212
4	Northern Districts	10	5	4	1	2	24	−0.004
5	Wellington	10	5	5	0	1	21	0.014
6	Central Districts	10	2	7	1	0	10	−0.838

Advances to Grand Final
Advance to Elimination Final

== Fixtures ==
=== Round 1 ===
17 November 2019
Scorecard

Wellington; 191 (44.5 overs)	v	Auckland; 195/6 (39.2 overs)
Jamie Gibson 64 (99); Ben Lister 5/18 (7.5 overs)		Sean Solia 65* (92); Ollie Newton 3/32 (8 overs)

Auckland won by 4 wickets
Eden Park Outer Oval, Auckland
Umpires: Billy Bowden and John Dempsey

- Auckland won the toss and elected to field.
- Louis Delport (Auckland) made his List A debut.
- Ben Lister (Auckland) took his first five-wicket haul in List A cricket.

17 November 2019
Scorecard

Central Districts; 349/4 (50 overs)	v	Canterbury; 3/0 (2.4 overs)
George Worker 135 (124); Andrew Ellis 3/68 (10 overs)		Chad Bowes 2* (10)

No result
Fitzherbert Park, Palmerston North
Umpires: Derek Walker and Damian Morrow

- Canterbury won the toss and elected to field.
- Rain during Canterbury's innings prevented any further play.
- Ryan Watson, Jayden Lennox and Raymond Toole (Central Districts) all made their List A debuts.
- Ben Smith (Central Districts) scored his first century in List A cricket.

17 November 2019
Scorecard

Otago; 282 (50 overs)	v	Northern Districts; 226/8 (44.2 overs)
Nick Kelly 120 (139); Brett Randell 4/59 (10 overs)		Henry Cooper 75 (83); Nathan Smith 3/21 (7 overs)

Otago won by 28 runs (DLS method)
Seddon Park, Hamilton
Umpires: Ashley Mehrotra and Tim Parlane

- Northern Districts won the toss and elected to field.
- Katene Clarke (Northern Districts) and Dale Phillips (Otago) both made their List A debuts.

=== Round 2 ===
21 November 2019
Scorecard

Auckland; 271 (50 overs)	v	Central Districts; 171 (40 overs)
Robert O'Donnell 69 (63); Seth Rance 3/47 (10 overs)		Tom Bruce 56 (59); Lockie Ferguson 5/38 (9 overs)

Auckland won by 100 runs
Eden Park Outer Oval, Auckland
Umpires: John Dempsey and Ashley Mehrotra

- Auckland won the toss and elected to bat.

21 November 2019
Scorecard

Northern Districts; 296/5 (50 overs)	v	Canterbury; 212 (42.4 overs)
Jack Boyle 126 (140); Zak Gibson 2/49 (9 overs)		Katene Clarke 48 (67); Andrew Ellis 2/32 (8 overs)

Northern Districts won by 84 runs
Seddon Park, Hamilton
Umpires: Billy Bowden and Tim Parlane

- Northern Districts won the toss and elected to field.

21 November 2019
Scorecard

Otago; 229/9 (50 overs)	v	Wellington; 230/5 (45.3 overs)
Nick Kelly 65 (85); Ollie Newton 3/36 (9 overs)		Devon Conway 79 (88); Matthew Bacon 1/27 (7 overs)

Wellington won by 5 wickets
Queens Park, Invercargill
Umpires: Shaun Haig and Wayne Knights

- Otago won the toss and elected to bat.
- Blair Soper (Otago) made his List A debut.

=== Round 3 ===
25 November 2019
Scorecard

Canterbury; 292/5 (50 overs)	v	Otago; 175 (38.5 overs)
Chad Bowes 76 (79); Nathan Smith 1/37 (8 overs)		Michael Rippon 48* (68); Andrew Hazeldine 3/14 (4 overs)

Canterbury won by 117 runs
Hagley Oval, Christchurch
Umpires: Garth Stirrat and Wayne Knights

- Canterbury won the toss and elected to bat.

25 November 2019
Scorecard

Central Districts; 270 (50 overs)	v	Northern Districts; 271/5 (48.4 overs)
Dane Cleaver 83 (100); Daryl Mitchell 3/54 (8 overs)		Tim Seifert 65 (89); Seth Rance 2/51 (10 overs)

Northern Districts won by 5 wickets
Bert Sutcliffe Oval, Lincoln
Umpires: Billy Bowden and John Dempsey

- Central Districts won the toss and elected to bat.

25 November 2019
Scorecard

Wellington; 344/5 (50 overs)	v	Auckland; 337/9 (50 overs)
Rachin Ravindra 130 (109); William Somerville (cricketer) 2/46 (10 overs)		Colin Munro 119 (87); Ollie Newton 3/53 (10 overs)

Wellington won by 7 runs
Lincoln No. 3, Lincoln
Umpires: Derek Walker and John Bromley

- Wellington won the toss and elected to bat.
- Rachin Ravindra (Wellington) scored his first century in List A cricket.

=== Round 4 ===
27 November 2019
Scorecard

Auckland; 310/5 (50 overs)	v	Otago; 213 (40.2 overs)
Glenn Phillips 156 (135); Nathan Smith 3/41 (10 overs)		Neil Broom 66 (84); Ben Lister 2/28 (7 overs)

Auckland won by 97 runs
Bert Sutcliffe Oval, Lincoln
Umpires: Derek Walker and John Bromley

- Auckland won the toss and elected to bat.

27 November 2019
Scorecard

Canterbury; 283 (49 overs)	v	Northern Districts; 282/9 (50 overs)
Cole McConchie 58 (70); Scott Kuggeleijn 4/50 (9 overs)		Dean Brownlie 66 (74); Edward Nuttall 3/69 (10 overs)

Canterbury won by 1 run
Hagley Oval, Christchurch
Umpires: Chris Brown and Tim Parlane

- Canterbury won the toss and elected to bat.

27 November 2019
Scorecard

Central Districts; 251/8 (50 overs)	v	Wellington; 222 (46.2 overs)
Tom Bruce 54 (58); Jeetan Patel 2/40 (10 overs)		Michael Bracewell 66 (93); Seth Rance 4/33 (8.2 overs)

Central Districts won by 29 runs
Lincoln No. 3, Lincoln
Umpires: Billy Bowden and John Dempsey

- Central Districts won the toss and elected to bat.
- Brad Schmulian (Central Districts) made his List A debut.

=== Round 5 ===
29 November 2019
Scorecard

Auckland; 401/8 (50 overs)	v	Canterbury; 217 (36.4 overs)
Colin Munro 167 (94); Edward Nuttall 3/67 (10 overs)		Jack Boyle 92 (82); William Somerville 4/48 (10 overs)

Auckland won by 184 runs
Hagley Oval, Christchurch
Umpires: Chris Brown and Kim Cotton

- Auckland won the toss and elected to bat.

29 November 2019
Scorecard

Central Districts; 285/7 (50 overs)	v	Northern Districts; 289/4 (48.1 overs)
Dane Cleaver 108 (102); Scott Kuggeleijn 3/39 (10 overs)		Joe Carter 78* (78); Seth Rance 2/54 (9.1 overs)

Northern Districts won by 6 wickets
Lincoln No. 3, Lincoln
Umpires: John Dempsey and Ashley Mehrotra

- Central Districts won the toss and elected to bat.

29 November 2019
Scorecard

Otago; 262/6 (50 overs)	v	Wellington; 260 (49.4 overs)
Neil Broom 112 (127); Ollie Newton 2/48 (10 overs)		Malcolm Nofal 87 (102); Dean Foxcroft 3/42 (10 overs)

Otago won by 2 runs
Bert Sutcliffe Oval, Lincoln
Umpires: Eugene Sanders and Tim Parlane

- Otago won the toss and elected to bat.

=== Round 6 ===
26 January 2020
Scorecard

Canterbury; 332/6 (50 overs)	v	Auckland; 328 (50 overs)
Henry Nicholls 120 (124); Louis Delport 2/50 (10 overs)		Ben Horne 101 (73); Andrew Ellis 3/47 (8 overs)

Canterbury won by 4 runs
Colin Maiden Park, Auckland
Umpires: Billy Bowden and Damian Morrow

- Canterbury won the toss and elected to bat.

26 January 2020
Scorecard

Otago; 407/4 (50 overs)	v	Central Districts; 282 (41.3 overs)
Hamish Rutherford 155 (104); Willem Ludick 2/65 (8 overs)		Kieran Noema-Barnett 76 (56); Anaru Kitchen 4/34 (6.3 overs)

Otago won by 125 runs
University Oval, Dunedin
Umpires: John Bromley and Cory Black

- Otago won the toss and elected to bat.
- Tommy Clout (Otago) made his List A debut.

26 January 2020
Scorecard

Wellington; 265/8 (50 overs)	v	Northern Districts; 266/9 (49.4 overs)
Devon Conway 138 (113); Anurag Verma 4/62 (10 overs)		Henry Cooper 83 (104); Iain McPeake 4/51 (10 overs)

Northern Districts won by 1 wicket
Basin Reserve, Wellington
Umpires: Eugene Sanders and John Dempsey

- Northern Districts won the toss and elected to field.

=== Round 7 ===
29 January 2020
Scorecard

Auckland; 297/7 (50 overs)	v	Northern Districts; 239 (46.4 overs)
Ben Horne 70 (46); Brett Randell 3/39 (9 overs)		BJ Watling 73 (97); Louis Delport 3/41 (10 overs)

Auckland won by 58 runs
Eden Park Outer Oval, Auckland
Umpires: Damian Morrow and Garth Stirrat

- Northern Districts won the toss and elected to field.

29 January 2020
Scorecard

Central Districts; 345/2 (50 overs)	v	Otago; 290 (45.5 overs)
Ben Smith 149* (151); Dean Foxcroft 1/39 (7 overs)		Dean Foxcroft 138 (141); Kieran Noema-Barnett 3/26 (2.5 overs)

Central Districts won by 55 runs
Saxton Oval, Nelson
Umpires: KS Jagannathan and Derek Walker

- Otago won the toss and elected to field.
- Bayley Wiggins (Central Districts) made his List A debut.

29 January 2020
Scorecard

Canterbury; 267/7 (50 overs)	v	Wellington; 268/4 (48.1 overs)
Cam Fletcher 73 (58); James Neesham 5/29 (10 overs)		Michael Bracewell 81* (82); Andrew Hazeldine 2/42 (7 overs)

Wellington won by 6 wickets
Basin Reserve, Wellington
Umpires: Cory Black and Tim Parlane

- Canterbury won the toss and elected to bat.

=== Round 8 ===
1 February 2020
Scorecard

Wellington; 275/7 (50 overs)	v	Canterbury; 253 (49.4 overs)
Tom Blundell 97 (99); Andrew Ellis 3/38 (10 overs)		Henry Nicholls 55 (71); Jakob Bhula 2/15 (4 overs)

Wellington won by 22 runs
Basin Reserve, Wellington
Umpires: Glen Walklin and Tim Parlane

- Wellington won the toss and elected to bat.
- Brett Johnson (Wellington) made his List A debut.

2 February 2020
Scorecard

Central Districts; 282/8 (50 overs)	v	Auckland; 283/6 (48 overs)
Bayley Wiggins 98 (109); Louis Delport 2/47 (10 overs)		Jeet Raval 118 (120); Seth Rance 2/54 (9 overs)

Auckland won by 4 wickets
Pukekura Park, New Plymouth
Umpires: Eugene Sanders and Garth Stirrat

- Auckland won the toss and elected to field.

2 February 2020
Scorecard

Otago	v	Northern Districts

Match abandoned
University Oval, Dunedin
Umpires: PJ Pasco and Derek Walker

- No toss.
- No play was possible due to rain.

=== Round 9 ===
5 February 2020
Scorecard

Northern Districts; 237 (48.3 overs)	v	Auckland; 174 (44.5 overs)
Katene Clarke 69 (79); Ben Lister 6/51 (9.3 overs)		Colin Munro 40 (53); Jake Gibson 5/31 (8.5 overs)

Northern Districts won by 63 runs
Cobham Oval, Whangārei
Umpires: Billy Bowden and Damian Morrow

- Northern Districts won the toss and elected to bat.
- Jake Gibson (Northern Districts) made his List A debut.

5 February 2020
Scorecard

Wellington; 293/5 (46 overs)	v	Central Districts; 175 (38.5 overs)
Devon Conway 112 (89); Raymond Toole 2/31 (8 overs)		Kieran Noema-Barnett 68 (95); Michael Bracewell 3/30 (8 overs)

Wellington won by 118 runs
Basin Reserve, Wellington
Umpires: Eugene Sanders and Derek Walker

- Central Districts won the toss and elected to field.
- Luke Georgeson (Wellington) made his List A debut.

5 February 2020
Scorecard

Otago; 253/8 (50 overs)	v	Canterbury; 230 (48.4 overs)
Dean Foxcroft 72 (87); Will Williams 3/54 (10 overs)		Andrew Ellis 44 (75); Jacob Duffy 5/38 (9.4 overs)

Otago won by 23 runs
Hagley Oval, Christchurch
Umpires: John Bromley and Tim Parlane

- Otago won the toss and elected to bat.
- Angus McKenzie (Otago) made his List A debut.

=== Round 10 ===
9 February 2020
Scorecard

Otago; 354/6 (50 overs)	v	Auckland; 144 (31.2 overs)
Neil Broom 104 (111); Louis Delport 2/64 (10 overs)		Jeet Raval 51 (58); Michael Rippon 5/21 (7 overs)

Otago won by 210 runs
University Oval, Dunedin
Umpires: KS Jagannathan and Eugene Sanders

- Otago won the toss and elected to bat.

9 February 2020
Scorecard

Central Districts; 237 (50 overs)	v	Canterbury; 239/1 (37.2 overs)
Bayley Wiggins 103 (94); Todd Astle 4/36 (10 overs)		Chad Bowes 114* (104); Ajaz Patel 1/49 (10 overs)

Canterbury won by 9 wickets
Pukekura Park, New Plymouth
Umpires: Glen Walklin and John Bromley

- Central Districts won the toss and elected to bat.

9 February 2020
Scorecard

Northern Districts; 249/9 (50 overs)	v	Wellington; 167 (42.2 overs)
Anton Devcich 76 (89); Iain McPeake 5/40 (9 overs)		Michael Bracewell 38 (43); Joe Walker 3/35 (10 overs)

Northern Districts won by 82 runs
Cobham Oval, Whangārei
Umpires: Derek Walker and Damian Morrow

- Northern Districts won the toss and elected to bat.

== Finals ==
Elimination Final			Grand Final
			1	Auckland	285/8 (44 overs)
2	Canterbury	288 (49.4 overs)	3	Otago	283 (49.4 overs)
3	Otago	294/9 (50 overs)

Elimination Final
13 February 2020
Scorecard

Otago; 294/9 (50 overs)	v	Canterbury; 288 (49.4 overs)
Mitch Renwick 75 (93); Todd Astle 2/44 (10 overs)		Jack Boyle 119 (131); Nathan Smith 3/41 (9.4 overs)

Otago won by 6 runs
Hagley Oval, Christchurch
Umpires: John Dempsey and Tim Parlane

- Otago won the toss and elected to bat.

Final
16 February 2020
Scorecard

Otago; 283 (49.4 overs)	v	Auckland; 285/8 (44 overs)
Anaru Kitchen 60 (54); Glenn Phillips 3/40 (8 overs)		Colin Munro 104 (60); Jacob Duffy 4/58 (10 overs)

Auckland won by 2 wickets
Eden Park Outer Oval, Auckland
Umpires: John Dempsey and Wayne Knights

- Otago won the toss and elected to bat.
