= 2018–19 Plunket Shield season =

Cricket tournament

2018–19 Plunket Shield
- Dates: 10 October 2018 – 20 March 2019
- Cricket format: First-class
- Tournament format: Round-robin
- Champions: Central Districts (11th title)
- Participants: 6
- Matches: 24
- Most runs: Devon Conway (659)
- Most wickets: Ish Sodhi (36)

The 2018–19 Plunket Shield was the 93rd season of the Plunket Shield, the domestic first-class cricket competition in New Zealand. It took place between October 2018 and March 2019. Unlike the previous edition of the competition, the tournament featured eight rounds of matches, instead of ten. Up to eleven international players, including New Zealand's captain Kane Williamson, were available for the opening round of the tournament.

In the opening round of fixtures, in the match between Central Districts and Canterbury, both teams declared one of their innings for no runs, in a rain-affected match, to ensure that a result was possible. The same situation also happened in round seven of the tournament, with Auckland declaring their first innings for no runs and Canterbury declaring their innings on 22/2 to get a result.

Ahead of the final round of fixtures, Central Districts had a fifteen point lead over Canterbury, needing just five more points to win the competition and retain their title. However, following the Christchurch mosque shootings, Canterbury withdrew from their final game, against Wellington, therefore Central Districts retained their title. It was the first time in more than fifty years that Central Districts had won back-to-back titles.

== Points table ==
Team	Pld	W	L	D	Ab	Pts
Central Districts	8	5	2	1	0	106
Canterbury	8	4	2	1	1	85
Auckland	8	3	2	3	0	77
Northern Districts	8	3	2	3	0	72
Wellington	8	1	3	3	1	54
Otago	8	1	6	1	0	41

Champions

== Fixtures ==
=== Round 1 ===
10–13 October 2018
Scorecard

Central Districts	v	Canterbury
352/7d (102.3 overs); Willem Ludick 116* (184); Matt Henry 4/115 (29.3 overs)		0/0d (0 overs)
0/0d (0 overs)		207 (88 overs); Henry Nicholls 43 (106); Seth Rance 5/53 (20 overs)

Central Districts won by 145 runs
Saxton Oval, Nelson
Umpires: Billy Bowden and John Bromley

- Canterbury won the toss and elected to field.
- No play was possible on days 2 and 3 due to rain.

10–13 October 2018
Scorecard

Otago	v	Northern Districts
108 (34.4 overs); Jacob Duffy 31 (30); Trent Boult 3/23 (10.4 overs)		136 (36.2 overs); Trent Boult 61 (37); Matthew Bacon 4/31 (9 overs)
231 (74 overs); Hamish Rutherford 115 (205); Neil Wagner 4/75 (22 overs)		204/2 (61.5 overs); Kane Williamson 83 (120); Michael Rippon 1/28 (10 overs)

Northern Districts won by 8 wickets
Bay Oval, Mount Maunganui
Umpires: Derek Walker and Tim Parlane

- Northern Districts won the toss and elected to field.

10–13 October 2018
Scorecard

Wellington	v	Auckland
255 (72.1 overs); Michael Bracewell 53 (97); Matt McEwan 4/48 (17 overs)		107/2 (38 overs); Devon Conway 39* (104); Ben Lister 1/19 (6 overs)

Match drawn
Basin Reserve, Wellington
Umpires: Tony Gillies and Ashley Mehrotra

- Auckland won the toss and elected to field.
- No play was possible on day 3 due to rain.
- Andrew Fletcher (Wellington) and Graeme Beghin (Auckland) both made their first-class debuts.

=== Round 2 ===
17–20 October 2018
Scorecard

Central Districts	v	Auckland
360 (96.5 overs); Dane Cleaver 117 (174); Matt McEwan 3/65 (22.5 overs)		184 (65.5 overs); Robert O'Donnell 36 (57); Adam Milne 3/30 (11 overs)
174 (56 overs); Christian Leopard 37 (51); Sean Solia 3/23 (6 overs)		199 (69.3 overs); Jeet Raval 57 (90); Doug Bracewell 3/33 (17 overs)

Central Districts won by 151 runs
Eden Park Outer Oval, Auckland
Umpires: Wayne Knights and Tony Gillies

- Auckland won the toss and elected to field.

17–20 October 2018
Scorecard

Northern Districts	v	Canterbury
378 (114.3 overs); Colin de Grandhomme 115 (135); Cole McConchie 2/41 (11.3 overs)		228 (88.1 overs); Stephen Murdoch 59 (147); Ish Sodhi 3/48 (23 overs)
234/6d (42.1 overs); Henry Cooper 58 (66); Matt Henry 2/64 (13.1 overs)		221/9 (96 overs); Jack Boyle 108 (244); Ish Sodhi 4/82 (38 overs)

Match drawn
Hagley Oval, Christchurch
Umpires: Billy Bowden and Shaun Haig

- Canterbury won the toss and elected to field.
- Jack Boyle (Canterbury) scored his maiden century in first-class cricket.

17–20 October 2018
Scorecard

Wellington	v	Otago
509/5d (135.4 overs); Devon Conway 203* (389); Nathan Smith 2/91 (28.4 overs)		190 (69.5 overs); Michael Rippon 47 (73); Hamish Bennett 4/60 (23 overs)
		218 (69.5 overs) (f/o); Michael Rippon 57* (70); Jeetan Patel 3/75 (32 overs)

Wellington won by an innings and 101 runs
Basin Reserve, Wellington
Umpires: Chris Brown and Derek Walker

- Otago won the toss and elected to field.

=== Round 3 ===
6–9 December 2018
Scorecard

Northern Districts	v	Wellington
251 (58.4 overs); Joe Carter 109 (128); Ollie Newton 4/58 (15.4 overs)		287/9d (92.2 overs); Devon Conway 74 (158); James Baker 4/68 (25 overs)
276 (85.1 overs); Peter Bocock 56 (72); Jeetan Patel 4/88 (28.1 overs)		142 (42.3 overs); Devon Conway 62 (99); Joe Walker 5/25 (11.3 overs)

Northern Districts won by 98 runs
Seddon Park, Hamilton
Umpires: Ashley Mehrotra and Tim Parlane

- Wellington won the toss and elected to field.
- Jakob Bhula and Ben Sears (Wellington) both made their first-class debuts.

6–9 December 2018
Scorecard

Central Districts	v	Otago
511/6d (160 overs); Greg Hay 226 (461); Nathan Smith 2/54 (23 overs)		162 (81.3 overs); Shawn Hicks 42 (121); Blair Tickner 4/26 (20 overs)
		265 (133.1 overs) (f/o); Josh Finnie 72 (167); Dean Foxcroft 4/57 (31 overs)

Central Districts won by an innings and 84 runs
Molyneux Park, Alexandra
Umpires: Derek Walker and John Bromley

- Central Districts won the toss and elected to bat.
- Camden Hawkins, Ben Lockrose (Otago) and Dean Foxcroft (Central Districts) all made their first-class debuts.

6–9 December 2018
Scorecard

Canterbury	v	Auckland
220 (90.2 overs); Cam Fletcher 79 (188); Sean Solia 3/31 (14 overs)		246 (76.2 overs); Sean Solia 51 (103); Theo van Woerkom 4/70 (23 overs)
282 (97 overs); Theo van Woerkom 61 (146); Jamie Brown 2/38 (12 overs)		257/6 (70.4 overs); Mark Chapman 89 (115); Theo van Woerkom 4/94 (22 overs)

Auckland won by 4 wickets
Eden Park Outer Oval, Auckland
Umpires: Billy Bowden and Tony Gillies

- Auckland won the toss and elected to field.

=== Round 4 ===
14–17 December 2018
Scorecard

Northern Districts	v	Auckland
134 (51.3 overs); Daniel Flynn 32 (65); Danru Ferns 4/33 (11 overs)		272 (80.3 overs); Sean Solia 71 (145); Scott Kuggeleijn 5/68 (20.3 overs)
262 (73 overs); Joe Carter 69 (95); Sean Solia 3/61 (12 overs)		127/1 (25.2 overs); Glenn Phillips 57* (69); Scott Kuggeleijn 1/35 (8 overs)

Auckland won by 9 wickets
Eden Park Outer Oval, Auckland
Umpires: Billy Bowden and Ashley Mehrotra

- Auckland won the toss and elected to field.

14–17 December 2018
Scorecard

Central Districts	v	Wellington
158 (55 overs); Brad Schmulian 49 (99); Hamish Bennett 5/39 (20 overs)		429 (133.5 overs); Michael Bracewell 98 (223); Dean Foxcroft 5/67 (29 overs)
336/4 (142 overs); Kieran Noema-Barnett 76 (208); Hamish Bennett 1/32 (15 overs)

Match drawn
Saxton Oval, Nelson
Umpires: Eugene Sanders and Wayne Knights

- Wellington won the toss and elected to field.

14–17 December 2018
Scorecard

Otago	v	Canterbury
206 (61.4 overs); Hamish Rutherford 45 (80); Andrew Hazeldine 5/33 (14.4 overs)		438 (130.1 overs); Cam Fletcher 108 (220); Matthew Bacon 4/97 (24.1 overs)
246 (97 overs); Camden Hawkins 76 (211); Kyle Jamieson 3/38 (20 overs)		15/1 (6 overs); Chad Bowes 7* (15); Nathan Smith 1/11 (3 overs)

Canterbury won by 9 wickets
University Oval, Dunedin
Umpires: Shaun Haig and Tim Parlane

- Otago won the toss and elected to bat.

=== Round 5 ===
21–24 February 2019
Scorecard

Central Districts	v	Canterbury
261 (66 overs); Tom Bruce 74 (75); Matt Henry 5/76 (20 overs)		280 (90.4 overs); Cam Fletcher 60 (111); Seth Rance 4/67 (17 overs)
226 (71.2 overs); George Worker 83 (126); Cole McConchie 4/46 (16.2 overs)		208/8 (56.5 overs); Stephen Murdoch 47 (72); Ryan McCone 4/25 (9.5 overs)

Canterbury won by 2 wickets
Mainpower Oval, Rangiora
Umpires: Garth Stirrat and Tim Parlane

- Central Districts won the toss and elected to bat.
- Todd Astle became the leading wicket-taker for Canterbury.
- Stephen Murdoch (Canterbury) scored his 5,000th run in the Plunket Shield.

21–24 February 2019
Scorecard

Wellington	v	Northern Districts
400/5d (103.5 overs); Devon Conway 156* (214); James Baker 2/75 (26 overs)		81/1d (24.2 overs); Tim Seifert 42* (61); Hamish Bennett 1/17 (6.2 overs)
53/2d (5.5 overs); Michael Bracewell 21* (8); James Baker 1/21 (2.5 overs)		312/9 (96 overs); BJ Watling 77 (144); Hamish Bennett 5/68 (20 overs)

Match drawn
Basin Reserve, Wellington
Umpires: Michael Graham-Smith and Billy Bowden

- Northern Districts won the toss and elected to field.
- No play was possible on day 4 due to rain.

21–24 February 2019
Scorecard

Auckland	v	Otago
337 (101.3 overs); Mark Chapman 104 (145); Matthew Bacon 4/78 (22.3 overs)		154 (65.3 overs); Hamish Rutherford 54 (96); Ben Lister 3/39 (15 overs)
		86 (27.3 overs) (f/o); Michael Rippon 25 (43); Matt McEwan 5/23 (12 overs)

Auckland won by an innings and 97 runs
Eden Park Outer Oval, Auckland
Umpires: John Dempsey and Ruchira Palliyaguruge

- Otago won the toss and elected to field.
- Tommy Clout (Otago) made his first-class debut.

=== Round 6 ===
1–4 March 2019
Scorecard

Canterbury	v	Wellington
424/8d (131 overs); Cole McConchie 162 (245); Hamish Bennett 5/85 (28 overs)		249 (83.1 overs); Michael Bracewell 74 (136); Matt Henry 5/46 (24.1 overs)
128/1 (23.1 overs); Stephen Murdoch 62* (75); Jeetan Patel 1/41 (8 overs)		301 (122.3 overs) (f/o); Ollie Newton 68 (232); Matt Henry 4/64 (31 overs)

Canterbury won by 9 wickets
Hagley Oval, Christchurch
Umpires: John Bromley and Tony Gillies

- Wellington won the toss and elected to field.

1–4 March 2019
Scorecard

Central Districts	v	Otago
584/8d (145.1 overs); Greg Hay 158 (327); Michael Rippon 4/174 (31.1 overs)		244 (88.2 overs); Nathan Smith 45 (94); Blair Tickner 4/25 (15 overs)
		335 (106.3 overs) (f/o); Hamish Rutherford 99 (218); Ajaz Patel 4/84 (35 overs)

Central Districts won by an innings and 5 runs
McLean Park, Napier
Umpires: Billy Bowden and John Dempsey

- Central Districts won the toss and elected to bat.
- Max Chu (Otago) made his first-class debut.

1–4 March 2019
Scorecard

Auckland	v	Northern Districts
468/9d (131 overs); Glenn Phillips 138* (227); Ish Sodhi 6/127 (38 overs)		376 (145 overs); Scott Kuggeleijn 66 (140); William Somerville 4/141 (54 overs)
249/6 (77 overs); Graeme Beghin 58 (96); Scott Kuggeleijn 2/47 (10 overs)

Match drawn
Cobham Oval, Whangārei
Umpires: Chris Brown and Tim Parlane

- Auckland won the toss and elected to bat.

=== Round 7 ===
9–12 March 2019
Scorecard

Wellington	v	Otago
284 (84.5 overs); Luke Woodcock 80 (158); Matthew Bacon 6/73 (16.5 overs)		285 (93.2 overs); Camden Hawkins 59 (95); Hamish Bennett 4/28 (27 overs)
307/9d (84.2 overs); Tom Blundell 100* (152); Matthew Bacon 4/71 (17 overs)		308/7 (70.5 overs); Mitch Renwick 66 (75); Hamish Bennett 2/43 (15 overs)

Otago won by 3 wickets
University Oval, Dunedin
Umpires: Derek Walker and John Bromley

- Wellington won the toss and elected to bat.

9–12 March 2019
Scorecard

Canterbury	v	Auckland
328 (121.3 overs); Stephen Murdoch 130* (297); William Somerville 3/80 (30 overs)		0/0d (0 overs)
22/2d (9.1 overs); Stephen Murdoch 11* (20); William Somerville 2/8 (4.1 overs)		270 (82.5 overs); Glenn Phillips 76 (107); Todd Astle 5/69 (22 overs)

Canterbury won by 80 runs
Mainpower Oval, Rangiora
Umpires: Wayne Knights and Tony Gillies

- Auckland won the toss and elected to field.

9–12 March 2019
Scorecard

Northern Districts	v	Central Districts
167 (53 overs); Scott Kuggeleijn 37 (65); Ajaz Patel 3/26 (6 overs)		216 (67.5 overs); Greg Hay 52 (100); Ish Sodhi 4/62 (26.5 overs)
222 (102.4 overs); Daryl Mitchell 41 (152); Ryan McCone 5/47 (24.4 overs)		174/9 (72.1 overs); Greg Hay 59 (163); Ish Sodhi 5/77 (30.1 overs)

Central Districts won by 1 wicket
McLean Park, Napier
Umpires: Ashley Mehrotra and Tim Parlane

- Northern Districts won the toss and elected to bat.

=== Round 8 ===
17–20 March 2019
Scorecard

Northern Districts	v	Central Districts
194 (60 overs); Tim Seifert 57 (99); Doug Bracewell 4/46 (15 overs)		281 (85.2 overs); Tom Bruce 56 (75); Ish Sodhi 3/80 (30 overs)
463/6d (138 overs); Dean Brownlie 104 (165); Ajaz Patel 3/162 (54 overs)		234 (91.5 overs); Kieran Noema-Barnett 101 (173); Ish Sodhi 4/99 (35.5 overs)

Northern Districts won by 142 runs
Seddon Park, Hamilton
Umpires: Wayne Knights and Ashley Mehrotra

- Northern Districts won the toss and elected bat.

17–20 March 2019
Scorecard

Otago	v	Auckland
483 (136.3 overs); Mitch Renwick 131 (186); Ben Lister 3/61 (17 overs)		247 (81 overs); Glenn Phillips 92 (128); Matthew Bacon 3/54 (18 overs)
		373/5 (113 overs) (f/o); Graeme Beghin 140 (240); Matthew Bacon 3/81 (22 overs)

Match drawn
University Oval, Dunedin
Umpires: Billy Bowden and Shaun Haig

- Auckland won the toss and elected to field.
- William O'Donnell (Auckland) made his first-class debut.
- Mitch Renwick (Otago) scored his maiden century in first-class cricket.
- Graeme Beghin (Auckland) scored his maiden century in first-class cricket.

17–20 March 2019
Scorecard

Wellington	v	Canterbury

Match cancelled
Basin Reserve, Wellington
Umpires: Derek Walker and Tim Parlane

- No toss.
- The match was cancelled following the Christchurch mosque shootings.
