= 2015–16 Ford Trophy =

Cricket tournament

- Dates: 27 December 2015 – 30 January 2016
- Administrator(s): New Zealand Cricket
- Cricket format: List A cricket
- Tournament format(s): Round-robin and knockout
- Champions: Central Districts (6th title)
- Participants: 6
- Matches: 28
- Most runs: Neil Broom (508)
- Most wickets: Seth Rance (19)
- Official website: www.blackcaps.co.nz

The 2015–16 Ford Trophy was the 45th season of the official List A cricket tournament in New Zealand, and the fifth in a sponsorship deal between New Zealand Cricket and Ford Motor Company. The competition ran from 27 December 2015 to 30 January 2016, and was won by the Central Districts who thrashed Canterbury to defend their title.

== Points table ==
Pos	Team	Pld	W	L	T	NR	BP	Pts	NRR
1	Canterbury	8	5	1	0	2	3	27	1.041
2	Central Districts	8	4	2	0	2	2	22	0.473
3	Otago	8	3	3	1	1	2	18	0.725
4	Auckland	8	4	4	0	0	1	17	−0.579
5	Northern Districts	8	3	5	0	0	1	13	−0.253
6	Wellington	8	1	5	1	1	0	8	−1.209

Teams qualified for the finals

== Group stage ==
=== Round 1 ===
27 December 2015
11:00
Scorecard

Central Districts; 167 (42.3 overs)	v	Canterbury; 168/4 (41.4 overs)
Dane Cleaver 33 (52); Todd Astle 3/38 (10 overs)		Ronnie Hira 70* (92); Seth Rance 2/29 (10 overs)

Canterbury won by 6 wickets
McLean Park, Napier
Umpires: Wayne Knights and Garth Stirrat

- Central Districts won the toss and elected to bat.
- Michael Davidson (Canterbury), Josh Clarkson and Ajaz Patel (Central Districts) all made their List A debuts.

27 December 2015
11:00
Scorecard

Otago; 313/8 (50 overs)	v	Auckland; 314/8 (49.3 overs)
Neil Broom 101 (99); Lachie Ferguson 4/68 (10 overs)		Colin Munro 110 (79); Mark Craig 2/52 (10 overs)

Auckland won by 2 wickets
Molyneux Park, Alexandra
Umpires: Barry Frost and Ashley Mehrotra

- Otago won the toss and elected to bat.
- Lachie Ferguson, Shawn Hicks (Auckland) and Warren Barnes (Otago) all made their List A debuts.

27 December 2015
11:00
Scorecard

Northern Districts; 267/9 (50 overs)	v	Wellington; 268/5 (45.4 overs)
Daniel Flynn 69 (84); Brent Arnel 4/45 (10 overs)		Craig Cachopa 95 (84); James Baker 2/50 (9 overs)

Wellington won by 5 wickets
Basin Reserve, Wellington
Umpires: Chris Brown and Tony Gillies

- Wellington won the toss and elected to field.

=== Round 2 ===
30 December 2015
11:00
Scorecard

Auckland; 278/8 (50 overs)	v	Northern Districts; 267/9 (50 overs)
Brad Cachopa 93 (116); James Baker 3/62 (10 overs)		Corey Anderson 88 (87); Lachie Ferguson 2/37 (10 overs)

Auckland won by 11 runs
Seddon Park, Hamilton
Umpires: Wayne Knights and Ashley Mehrotra

- Northern Districts won the toss and elected to field.

30 December 2015
11:00
Scorecard

Canterbury; 228 (47.4 overs)	v	Otago; 163 (39.5 overs)
Peter Fulton 81 (92); Sam Wells 3/44 (10 overs)		Neil Wagner 37* (40); Todd Astle 2/10 (4.2 overs)

Canterbury won by 65 runs
Molyneux Park, Alexandra
Umpires: Shaun Haig and Phil Jones

- Otago won the toss and elected to field.

30 December 2015
11:00
Scorecard

Central Districts; 241 (44.2 overs)	v	Wellington; 209 (48 overs)
George Worker 114 (120); Luke Woodcock 3/25 (7.2 overs)		Luke Woodcock 102 (103); Seth Rance 4/32 (9 overs)

Central Districts won by 32 runs
Basin Reserve, Wellington
Umpires: Barry Frost and Tony Gillies

- Central Districts won the toss and elected to bat.

=== Round 3 ===
3 January 2016
11:00
Scorecard

Northern Districts; 302/8 (50 overs)	v	Auckland; 201 (40.3 overs)
Corey Anderson 98 (119); James Fuller 4/54 (9 overs)		Robert O'Donnell 62 (88); Brett Hampton 4/30 (7.3 overs)

Northern Districts won by 101 runs
Eden Park Outer Oval, Auckland
Umpires: Tony Gillies and Phil Jones

- Auckland won the toss and elected to field.

3 January 2016
11:00
Scorecard

Wellington; 32/3 (5.4 overs)	v	Canterbury
Michael Papps 21 (15); Ed Nuttall 2/15 (3 overs)

No result
Hagley Oval, Christchurch
Umpires: Chris Brown and Wayne Knights

- Canterbury won the toss and elected to field.
- Rain stopped played during the 6th over of Wellington's innings.

3 January 2016
11:00
Scorecard

Central Districts	v	Otago

Match abandoned
Pukekura Park, New Plymouth
Umpires: Barry Frost and Tim Parlane

- No toss.

=== Round 4 ===
6 January 2016
11:00
Scorecard

Auckland; 288/9 (50 overs)	v	Wellington; 276 (49.5 overs)
Michael Guptill-Bunce 73 (73); Matt McEwan 3/76 (10 overs)		Tom Blundell 73 (68); Shawn Hicks 2/28 (8 overs)

Auckland won by 12 runs
Eden Park Outer Oval, Auckland
Umpires: Tony Gillies and Ashley Mehrotra

- Auckland won the toss and elected to bat.
- Michael Guptill-Bunce (Auckland) made his List A debut.

6 January 2016
11:00
Scorecard

Canterbury; 257/7 (50 overs)	v	Otago; 210 (46.1 overs)
Todd Astle 59 (85); Neil Wagner 3/42 (10 overs)		Hamish Rutherford 46 (76); Todd Astle 3/31 (9.1 overs)

Canterbury won by 47 runs
Hagley Oval, Christchurch
Umpires: Chris Brown and Tim Parlane

- Canterbury won the toss and elected to bat.

6 January 2016
11:00
Scorecard

Central Districts; 363/9 (50 overs)	v	Northern Districts; 282 (45.5 overs)
Will Young 85 (57); Tony Goodin 4/69 (10 overs)		Daryl Mitchell 102 (107); Seth Rance 4/53 (8 overs)

Central Districts won by 81 runs
Pukekura Park, New Plymouth
Umpires: Barry Frost and S. K. Ryan

- Central Districts won the toss and elected to bat.
- Blair Tickner (Central Districts), Tony Goodin and Nick Kelly (Northern Districts) all made their List A debuts.

=== Round 5 ===
9 January 2016
11:00
Scorecard

Auckland; 243/7 (50 overs)	v	Canterbury; 245/4 (37.4 overs)
Brad Cachopa 107 (146); Todd Astle 3/44 (10 overs)		Peter Fulton 65 (55); Lachie Ferguson 2/65 (9.4 overs)

Canterbury won by 6 wickets
Eden Park Outer Oval, Auckland
Umpires: Wayne Knights and Ashley Mehrotra

- Canterbury won the toss and elected to field.

10 January 2016
11:00
Scorecard

Central Districts; 324/7 (50 overs)	v	Wellington; 141/4 (29.2 overs)
Jesse Ryder 83 (74); Jeetan Patel 3/61 (10 overs)		Michael Pollard 43 (48); Blair Tickner 2/45 (6 overs)

Central Districts won by 55 runs (D/L method)
Fitzherbert Park, Palmerston North
Umpires: John Bromley and Tim Parlane

- Wellington won the toss and elected to field.

10 January 2016
11:00
Scorecard

Otago; 298/6 (50 overs)	v	Northern Districts; 295/7 (50 overs)
Neil Broom 124 (128); Tony Goodin 3/57 (10 overs)		Anton Devcich 81 (78); Neil Wagner 2/55 (10 overs)

Otago won by 3 runs
Cobham Oval, Whangārei
Umpires: Barry Frost and Tony Gillies

- Northern Districts won the toss and elected to field.

=== Round 6 ===
13 January 2016
11:00
Scorecard

Canterbury; 265 (48.5 overs)	v	Auckland; 167 (35.5 overs)
Tom Latham 96 (111); Colin de Grandhomme 3/42 (8 overs)		Mark Chapman 34 (33); Ed Nuttall 4/50 (10 overs)

Canterbury won by 98 runs
Hagley Oval, Christchurch
Umpires: Tim Parlane and Derek Walker

- Canterbury won the toss and elected to bat.
- Michael Barry (Auckland) made his List A debut.

13 January 2016
11:00
Scorecard

Central Districts; 224 (48.5 overs)	v	Northern Districts; 227/2 (42.4 overs)
Doug Bracewell 80 (103); James Baker 3/30 (7 overs)		Dean Brownlie 107* (129); Seth Rance 1/22 (6 overs)

Northern Districts won by 8 wickets
Cobham Oval, Whangārei
Umpires: Chris Jones and Phil Jones

- Central Districts won the toss and elected to bat.

13 January 2016
11:00
Scorecard

Otago; 249 (47.5 overs)	v	Wellington; 74/1 (23 overs)
Neil Broom 54 (57); Brent Arnel 2/23 (9 overs)		Stephen Murdoch 35* (62); Jacob Duffy 1/8 (5 overs)

Match tied (D/L method)
Basin Reserve, Wellington
Umpires: Tony Gillies and Ashley Mehrotra

- Otago won the toss and elected to bat.

=== Round 7 ===
17 January 2016
11:00
Scorecard

Central Districts; 110/4 (18.3 overs)	v	Canterbury
Ben Smith 36* (40); Kyle Jamieson 2/23 (4 overs)

No result
Hagley Oval, Christchurch
Umpires: Tony Gillies and R. G. Hooper

- Canterbury won the toss and elected to field.
- Ken McClure and Henry Shipley (Canterbury) both made their List A debuts.

17 January 2016
11:00
Scorecard

Northern Districts; 181 (46.1 overs)	v	Otago; 187/2 (27.4 overs)
Dean Brownlie 44 (81); Sam Wells 3/25 (10 overs)		Neil Broom 69* (76); James Baker 1/42 (7 overs)

Otago won by 8 wickets
University Oval, Dunedin
Umpires: Barry Frost and Ashley Mehrotra

- Otago won the toss and elected to field.

17 January 2016
11:00
Scorecard

Wellington; 199 (49.1 overs)	v	Auckland; 203/3 (39 overs)
Michael Pollard 51 (78); Colin de Grandhomme 4/37 (10 overs)		Brad Cachopa 85 (118); Anurag Verma 3/48 (7 overs)

Auckland won by 7 wickets
Basin Reserve, Wellington
Umpires: Shaun Haig and Tim Parlane

- Wellington won the toss and elected to bat.

=== Round 8 ===
20 January 2016
11:00
Scorecard

Central Districts; 348/7 (50 overs)	v	Auckland; 301/9 (50 overs)
Tom Bruce 91 (62); Donovan Grobbelaar 4/65 (10 overs)		Mark Chapman 157 (111); Seth Rance 3/40 (9 overs)

Central Districts won by 47 runs
Eden Park Outer Oval, Auckland
Umpires: Barry Frost and Wayne Knights

- Auckland won the toss and elected to field.

20 January 2016
11:00
Scorecard

Canterbury; 251/8 (50 overs)	v	Northern Districts; 255/7 (49.4 overs)
Andrew Ellis 96* (119); Tony Goodin 3/36 (7 overs)		Dean Brownlie 67 (77); Tim Johnston 3/39 (10 overs)

Northern Districts won by 3 wickets
Bay Oval, Mount Maunganui
Umpires: Tony Gillies and Ashley Mehrotra

- Canterbury won the toss and elected to bat.
- Cody Andrews (Northern Districts) made his List A debut.

20 January 2016
11:00
Scorecard

Otago; 362/8 (50 overs)	v	Wellington; 141 (23.3 overs)
Hamish Rutherford 126 (90); Luke Woodcock 3/56 (7 overs)		Michael Pollard 35 (27); Neil Wagner 4/43 (8.3 overs)

Otago won by 221 runs
Queen's Park, Invercargill
Umpires: John Dempsey and Tim Parlane

- Otago won the toss and elected to bat.

== Finals ==
=== 1st Preliminary Final ===
23 January 2016
11:00
Scorecard

Canterbury; 294/8 (50 overs)	v	Central Districts; 295/8 (49.3 overs)
Tom Latham 126 (135); Doug Bracewell 3/55 (10 overs)		Jesse Ryder 136 (114); Kyle Jamieson 3/59 (10 overs)

Central Districts won by 2 wickets
Hagley Oval, Christchurch
Umpires: Tony Gillies and Wayne Knights

- Central Districts won the toss and elected to field.

=== 2nd Preliminary Final ===
23 January 2016
11:00
Scorecard

Otago; 312/7 (50 overs)	v	Auckland; 159/8 (34 overs)
Neil Broom 109 (120); Donovan Grobbelaar 3/48 (8 overs)		Robert O'Donnell 37 (42); Jacob Duffy 3/16 (6 overs)

Otago won by 125 runs (D/L method)
Queen's Park, Invercargill
Umpires: Chris Brown and Tim Parlane

- Otago won the toss and elected to bat.

=== 3rd Preliminary Final ===
27 January 2016
11:00
Scorecard

Canterbury; 108/4 (26 overs)	v	Otago
Ken McClure 34* (48); Jacob Duffy 2/24 (6 overs)

No result
Hagley Oval, Christchurch
Umpires: Chris Brown and Tim Parlane

- Otago won the toss and elected to field.
- Canterbury advanced to the final, after finishing above Otago in the points table.

=== Final ===
30 January 2016
11:00
Scorecard

Central Districts; 405/6 (50 overs)	v	Canterbury; 249 (37.4 overs)
George Worker 159 (151); Kyle Jamieson 2/81 (9 overs)		Andrew Ellis 101 (76); Bevan Small 3/59 (7 overs)

Central Districts won by 156 runs
Pukekura Park, New Plymouth
Umpires: Wayne Knights and Tim Parlane

- Central Districts won the toss and elected to bat.
