= 2017–18 Super Smash =

Cricket tournament

- Dates: 13 December 2017 – 20 January 2018
- Administrator: New Zealand Cricket
- Cricket format: Twenty20 cricket
- Tournament format(s): Round-robin and knockout
- Champions: Northern Knights (2nd title)
- Participants: 6
- Matches: 32
- Most runs: Anton Devcich (343)
- Most wickets: Blair Tickner (21)
- Official website: Super Smash

The 2017–18 Burger King Super Smash (named after the competition's sponsor Burger King) was the thirteenth season of the Men's Super Smash Twenty20 cricket tournament in New Zealand. The competition was run from 13 December 2017 to 20 January 2018. The Wellington Firebirds were the defending champions.

Following the completion of the round-robin fixtures, Northern Knights, Auckland Aces and Central Stags had qualified for the finals of the competition. Northern Knights won the tournament after they beat Central Stags by nine wickets in the final.

== Points table ==
Pos	Team	Pld	W	L	NR	Pts	NRR
1	Northern Knights	10	7	2	1	30	0.753
2	Auckland Aces	10	5	3	2	24	0.205
3	Central Stags	10	5	4	1	22	1.049
4	Canterbury Kings	10	4	5	1	18	0.959
5	Wellington Firebirds	10	3	5	2	16	−0.280
6	Otago Volts	10	2	7	1	10	−2.709

Team qualified for the finals

== Fixtures ==
=== Round-robin ===
13 December 2017
Scorecard

Central Stags; 192/5 (20 overs)	v	Auckland Aces; 194/4 (18.2 overs)
Jesse Ryder 54 (40); Lockie Ferguson 2/34 (4 overs); Tarun Nethula 2/34 (4 overs)		Robert O'Donnell 54* (37); Blair Tickner 2/44 (4 overs)

Auckland won by 5 wickets
Eden Park Outer Oval, Auckland
Umpires: Shaun Haig and Wayne Knights

- Central Districts won the toss and elected to bat.
- Teja Nidamanuru and Ben Lister (Auckland) both made their T20 debuts.

14 December 2017
Scorecard

Canterbury Kings; 217/9 (20 overs)	v	Otago Volts; 83 (11.4 overs)
Ben Stokes 93 (47); Jacob Duffy 5/39 (4 overs)		Rob Nicol 26 (16); Todd Astle 3/18 (2.4 overs)

Canterbury won by 134 runs
Hagley Oval, Christchurch
Umpires: Tim Parlane and Derek Walker

- Canterbury won the toss and elected to bat first.
- Nick Kwant, Will Williams (Canterbury) and Jack Hunter (Otago) all made their T20 debuts.
- This was Otago's joint-lowest score in a T20.

14 December 2017
Scorecard

Wellington Firebirds; 176/5 (20 overs)	v	Northern Knights; 144/7 (20 overs)
Michael Bracewell 56* (28); Ish Sodhi 2/21 (4 overs)		Ish Sodhi 51 (36); Anurag Verma 3/37 (4 overs)

Wellington won by 32 runs
Seddon Park, Hamilton
Umpires: Billy Bowden and Chris Brown

- Northern Districts won the toss and elected to field.
- Brett Randell (Northern Districts) made his T20 debut.

16 December 2017
Scorecard

Northern Knights; 214/9 (20 overs)	v	Auckland Aces; 207/6 (20 overs)
Tim Seifert 107 (42); Ben Lister 3/30 (4 overs)		Glenn Phillips 65 (38); Ben Laughlin 3/27 (4 overs)

Northern Districts won by 7 runs
Bay Oval, Mount Maunganui
Umpires: Billy Bowden and Wayne Knights

- Northern Districts won the toss and elected to bat.
- Tim Seifert (Northern Districts) scored the fastest century in a domestic T20 match in New Zealand.

17 December 2017
Scorecard

Central Stags; 213/5 (20 overs)	v	Canterbury Kings; 205/6 (20 overs)
Jesse Ryder 84 (40); Andrew Ellis 2/28 (3 overs)		Cam Fletcher 74* (39); Seth Rance 2/37 (4 overs); Blair Tickner 2/37 (4 overs)

Central Districts won by 8 runs
Saxton Oval, Nelson
Umpires: John Bromley and Ashley Mehrotra

- Central Districts won the toss and elected to bat.
- Blake Coburn and Andrew Hazeldine (Canterbury) both made their T20 debuts.

17 December 2017
Scorecard

Otago Volts	v	Wellington Firebirds

No result
University Oval, Dunedin
Umpires: Shaun Haig and Tim Parlane

- Otago won the toss.
- No play was possible due to rain.

20 December 2017
Scorecard

Northern Knights; 145/6 (20 overs)	v	Wellington Firebirds; 144/9 (20 overs)
Dean Brownlie 34 (26); Samit Patel 3/28 (4 overs)		Devon Conway 53 (36); Ish Sodhi 2/23 (4 overs)

Northern Districts won by 1 run
Basin Reserve, Wellington
Umpires: Tim Parlane and Derek Walker

- Northern Districts won the toss and elected to bat.

22 December 2017
Scorecard

Canterbury Kings; 174/5 (20 overs)	v	Central Stags; 157/9 (20 overs)
Chad Bowes 82 (55); Blair Tickner 2/21 (4 overs)		Dane Cleaver 30 (21); Jeremy Benton 3/27 (4 overs)

Canterbury won by 17 runs
Mainpower Oval, Rangiora
Umpires: Tony Gillies and Ashley Mehrotra

- Canterbury won the toss and elected to bat first.
- Christian Leopard (Central Districts) made his T20 debut.

23 December 2017
Scorecard

Northern Knights; 212/8 (20 overs)	v	Otago Volts; 106 (15 overs)
Daniel Flynn 47 (26); Warren Barnes 3/33 (3 overs)		Shawn Hicks 52 (28); Anton Devcich 4/12 (3 overs)

Northern Districts won by 106 runs
Seddon Park, Hamilton
Umpires: Billy Bowden and Tim Parlane

- Otago won the toss and elected to field.

24 December 2017
Scorecard

Wellington Firebirds; 206/7 (20 overs)	v	Auckland Aces; 208/8 (20 overs)
Luke Ronchi 102 (46); Tarun Nethula 3/27 (4 overs)		Mark Chapman 64 (24); Luke Woodcock 2/12 (2 overs)

Auckland won by 2 wickets
Eden Park Outer Oval, Auckland
Umpires: Billy Bowden and Shaun Haig

- Auckland won the toss and elected to field.
- Ian McPeake (Wellington) made his T20 debut.
- Luke Ronchi (Wellington) scored the second-fastest century in a T20 in New Zealand.

26 December 2017
Scorecard

Wellington Firebirds	v	Auckland Aces

Match abandoned
Basin Reserve, Wellington
Umpires: John Dempsey and Ashley Mehrotra

- No toss.
- No play was possible due to rain.

26 December 2017
Scorecard

Otago Volts; 144/9 (20 overs)	v	Canterbury Kings; 147/4 (18.1 overs)
Rob Nicol 65 (58); Andrew Ellis 5/16 (4 overs)		Nick Kwant 48 (35); Warren Barnes 2/20 (4 overs)

Canterbury won by 6 wickets
Molyneux Park, Alexandra
Umpires: John Bromley and Chris Gaffaney

- Otago won the toss and elected to bat.

27 December 2017
Scorecard

Central Stags; 201/4 (20 overs)	v	Northern Knights; 151/9 (20 overs)
Josh Clarkson 52* (25); Brent Arnel 2/35 (4 overs)		Tim Seifert 37 (32); Blair Tickner 4/24 (4 overs)

Central Districts won by 49 runs
Bay Oval, Mount Maunganui
Umpires: Billy Bowden and Shaun Haig

- Central Districts won the toss and elected to bat.

28 December 2017
Scorecard

Otago Volts; 147/7 (20 overs)	v	Auckland Aces; 150/3 (17.5 overs)
Hamish Rutherford 51 (47); Ben Lister 3/25 (4 overs)		Craig Cachopa 52* (35); Ben Lockrose 1/23 (4 overs)

Auckland won by 7 wickets
Molyneux Park, Alexandra
Umpires: Chris Gaffaney and Derek Walker

- Otago won the toss and elected to bat.
- Ben Lockrose (Otago) made his T20 debut.

28 December 2017
Scorecard

Canterbury Kings; 138/9 (20 overs)	v	Wellington Firebirds; 139/5 (18.3 overs)
Andrew Ellis 36 (29); Anurag Verma 2/15 (3 overs)		Tom Blundell 53 (37); Tim Johnston 2/20 (4 overs)

Wellington won by 5 wickets
Basin Reserve, Wellington
Umpires: John Dempsey and Ashley Mehrotra

- Canterbury won the toss and elected to bat.

30 December 2017
Scorecard

Central Stags; 181/8 (20 overs)	v	Northern Knights; 182/5 (18 overs)
George Worker 75 (38); Anton Devcich 3/21 (4 overs)		Tim Seifert 47 (36); Ajaz Patel 2/37 (4 overs)

Northern Districts won by 5 wickets
Pukekura Park, New Plymouth
Umpires: Ashley Mehrotra and Damian Morrow

- Central Districts won the toss and elected to bat.

31 December 2017
Scorecard

Otago Volts; 159/7 (20 overs)	v	Wellington Firebirds; 162/3 (13 overs)
Shawn Hicks 50 (37); Samit Patel 2/26 (4 overs)		Luke Ronchi 49 (32); Rob Nicol 1/13 (2 overs)

Wellington won by 7 wickets
Basin Reserve, Wellington
Umpires: Billy Bowden and Derek Walker

- Wellington won the toss and elected to field.

1 January 2018
Scorecard

Auckland Aces; 168/5 (20 overs)	v	Canterbury Kings; 161/8 (20 overs)
Mark Chapman 101 (58); Edward Nuttall 2/23 (3 overs)		Tom Latham 46 (31); Tarun Nethula 2/32 (4 overs)

Auckland won by 7 runs
Hagley Oval, Christchurch
Umpires: John Bromley and Tim Parlane

- Auckland won the toss and elected to bat.
- Mark Chapman (Auckland) scored his first century in T20s.

2 January 2018
Scorecard

Otago Volts; 156/8 (20 overs)	v	Northern Knights; 158/1 (16 overs)
Josh Finnie 46 (28); Chris Jordan 2/28 (4 overs)		Anton Devcich 88* (51); Jacob Duffy 1/27 (3 overs)

Northern Districts won by 9 wickets
University Oval, Dunedin
Umpires: Tony Gillies and Derek Walker

- Otago won the toss and elected to bat.
- Llew Johnson, Matthew Bacon (Otago) and Sean Davey (Northern Districts) all made their T20 debuts.

4 January 2018
Scorecard

Central Stags	v	Auckland Aces

Match abandoned
Pukekura Park, New Plymouth
Umpires: Billy Bowden and Tim Parlane

- No toss.
- No play was possible due to rain.

5 January 2018
Scorecard

Canterbury Kings	v	Northern Knights

Match abandoned
Hagley Oval, Christchurch
Umpires: John Bromley and Tony Gillies

- No toss.
- No play was possible due to rain.

6 January 2018
Scorecard

Central Stags; 147/9 (20 overs)	v	Otago Volts; 153/7 (18.2 overs)
Seth Rance 42 (15); Michael Rae 3/14 (4 overs)		Rob Nicol 43 (41); Seth Rance 3/33 (4 overs)

Otago won by 3 wickets
Pukekura Park, New Plymouth
Umpires: Tim Parlane and Eugene Sanders

- Central Districts won the toss and elected to bat.

7 January 2018
Scorecard

Auckland Aces; 202/5 (20 overs)	v	Northern Knights; 203/4 (16.5 overs)
Mark Chapman 57 (30); Ish Sodhi 2/35 (4 overs)		Anton Devcich 76 (37); Ronnie Hira 2/24 (3 overs)

Northern Districts won by 6 wickets
Eden Park Outer Oval, Auckland
Umpires: Billy Bowden and Ashley Mehrotra

- Northern Districts won the toss and elected to field.

7 January 2018
Scorecard

Canterbury Kings; 150/7 (20 overs)	v	Wellington Firebirds; 88 (14.5 overs)
Chad Bowes 41 (33); Logan van Beek 2/15 (4 overs)		Michael Bracewell 41* (34); Edward Nuttall 3/13 (3 overs)

Canterbury won by 62 runs
Hagley Oval, Christchurch
Umpires: Tony Gillies and Derek Walker

- Wellington won the toss and elected to field.

9 January 2018
Scorecard

Otago Volts; 217/9 (20 overs)	v	Central Stags; 99 (13.4 overs)
Will Young 79 (43); Matthew Bacon 4/31 (4 overs)		Michael Rippon 22 (14); Seth Rance 3/15 (2.4 overs)

Central Districts won by 118 runs
Queens Park, Invercargill
Umpires: Eugene Sanders and Derek Walker

- Otago won the toss and elected to field.

10 January 2018
Scorecard

Canterbury Kings; 145/9 (20 overs)	v	Auckland Aces; 149/6 (17.4 overs)
Cam Fletcher 46 (42); Ronnie Hira 4/26 (4 overs)		Robert O'Donnell 55 (42); Will Williams 2/10 (1 over)

Auckland won by 4 wickets
Eden Park Outer Oval, Auckland
Umpires: Billy Bowden and Tim Parlane

- Auckland won the toss and elected to field.

12 January 2018
Scorecard

Central Stags; 209/6 (20 overs)	v	Wellington Firebirds; 153 (19 overs)
Tom Bruce 59 (29); Logan van Beek 3/60 (4 overs)		Tom Blundell 53 (41); Seth Rance 2/19 (3 overs)

Central Districts won by 56 runs
Pukekura Park, New Plymouth
Umpires: Ashley Mehrotra and Garth Stirrat

- Central Districts won the toss and elected to bat.

14 January 2018
Scorecard

Canterbury Kings; 190/5 (20 overs)	v	Northern Knights; 191/6 (18.5 overs)
Chad Bowes 39 (18); Ish Sodhi 2/29 (4 overs)		Dean Brownlie 86 (50); Cole McConchie 2/26 (3 overs)

Northern Districts won by 4 wickets
Seddon Park, Hamilton
Umpires: Garth Stirrat and Derek Walker

- Northern Districts won the toss and elected to field.

14 January 2018
Scorecard

Central Stags; 194/6 (20 overs)	v	Wellington Firebirds; 165/5 (20 overs)
Jesse Ryder 52 (35); Ollie Newton 2/19 (2 overs)		Samit Patel 38 (39); Ben Wheeler 2/30 (4 overs)

Central Districts won by 29 runs
Basin Reserve, Wellington
Umpires: John Bromley and Tim Parlane

- Central Districts won the toss and elected to bat.

14 January 2018
Scorecard

Auckland Aces; 139/9 (20 overs)	v	Otago Volts; 143/8 (19.5 overs)
Robert O'Donnell 34 (31); Matthew Bacon 4/31 (4 overs)		Derek de Boorder 50* (40); Sam Curran 2/20 (4 overs)

Otago won by 2 wickets
Eden Park Outer Oval, Auckland
Umpires: Billy Bowden and Tony Gillies

- Otago won the toss and elected to field.

=== Finals ===
Elimination Final
17 January 2018
Scorecard

Central Stags; 163/6 (20 overs)	v	Auckland Aces; 127 (17.3 overs)
Dane Cleaver 54 (33); Sean Solia 2/16 (2 overs)		Craig Cachopa 38 (27); Seth Rance 3/22 (3.3 overs)

Central Districts won by 36 runs
Eden Park Outer Oval, Auckland
Umpires: Billy Bowden and Derek Walker

- Auckland won the toss and elected to field.

Final
20 January 2018
Scorecard

Central Stags; 99/8 (20 overs)	v	Northern Knights; 103/1 (8.5 overs)
George Worker 37 (33); Anton Devcich 3/16 (4 overs)		Anton Devcich 51* (24); Blair Tickner 1/30 (2 overs)

Northern District won by 9 wickets
Seddon Park, Hamilton
Umpires: Billy Bowden and Tim Parlane

- Central District won the toss elected to bat.
