= 2017–18 Plunket Shield season =

Cricket tournament in New Zealand

2017–18 Plunket Shield
- Dates: 23 October 2017 – 5 April 2018
- Cricket format: First-class
- Tournament format: Round-robin
- Champions: Central Districts (10th title)
- Participants: 6
- Matches: 30
- Most runs: Michael Papps (814)
- Most wickets: Ajaz Patel (48)

The 2017–18 Plunket Shield was the 92nd season of the Plunket Shield, the domestic first-class cricket competition in New Zealand. The competition started on 23 October 2017 and finished on 5 April 2018.

The round eight fixture between Canterbury and Auckland at the Mainpower Oval in Rangiora was called off due to an unsafe pitch. The umpires abandoned the game after only three balls were bowled on day three of the match.

Central Districts won the tournament, following the final round of fixtures, after their nearest rivals, Wellington, failed to win their last match.

== Points table ==
Team	Pld	W	L	D	Ab	Pts
Central Districts	10	6	0	4	0	131
Wellington	10	6	3	1	0	127
Auckland	10	5	3	2	0	105
Northern Districts	10	2	4	4	0	80
Otago	10	2	7	1	0	79
Canterbury	10	2	6	2	0	64

Winner

== Fixtures ==
=== Round 1 ===
23–26 October 2017
Scorecard

Auckland	v	Wellington
62 (23 overs); Tarun Nethula 23 (48); Ollie Newton 4/26 (8 overs)		553/3d (137 overs); Michael Papps 316* (435); Lockie Ferguson 2/127 (26 overs)
286 (103.3 overs); Jeet Raval 73 (201); Ian McPeake 3/51 (17 overs)

Wellington won by an innings and 205 runs
Basin Reserve, Wellington
Umpires: Shaun Haig and Tim Parlane

- Wellington won the toss and elected to field.
- Ollie Newton (Wellington) made his first-class debut.
- Michael Papps made the highest individual score for Wellington and became the oldest New Zealand batsman to score a triple century in first-class cricket.
- Michael Papps and Luke Woodcock made the highest opening partnership and the highest partnership for any wicket in first-class cricket in New Zealand with 432 runs.

23–26 October 2017
Scorecard

Northern Districts	v	Central Districts
439/5d (103.5 overs); Bharat Popli 84 (192); Ajaz Patel 3/83 (26.5 overs)		313/7d (78 overs); Brad Schmulian 203 (207); Scott Kuggeleijn 3/67 (15 overs)
181/9d (35 overs); Daniel Flynn 64 (60); Ajaz Patel 6/48 (11 overs)		223/7 (65 overs); Greg Hay 76 (131); James Baker 2/19 (7 overs)

Match drawn
Bay Oval, Mount Maunganui
Umpires: Tony Gillies and Wayne Knights

- Central Districts won the toss and elected to field.
- No play was possible on day 1.
- Brad Schmulian (Central Districts) made his first-class debut.
- Brad Schmulian made the highest total on debut in first-class cricket in New Zealand.

23–26 October 2017
Scorecard

Canterbury	v	Otago
155 (68.1 overs); Michael Pollard 54 (136); Jacob Duffy 3/24 (15 overs)		216 (88.5 overs); Brad Wilson 58 (184); Tim Johnston 3/49 (30.5 overs)
299 (81.5 overs); Brett Hampton 60 (55); Mark Craig 4/87 (32 overs)		239/3 (80.4 overs); Hamish Rutherford 90 (126); Blake Coburn 2/87 (24.4 overs)

Otago won by 7 wickets
Hagley Oval, Christchurch
Umpires: Billy Bowden and Chris Brown

- Canterbury won the toss and elected to bat.
- Blake Coburn and Fraser Sheat (Canterbury) both made their first-class debuts.

=== Round 2 ===
30 October–2 November 2017
Scorecard

Central Districts	v	Auckland
472 (108.2 overs); Jesse Ryder 175 (237); Lockie Ferguson 5/129 (27 overs)		349 (96.1 overs); Michael Guptill-Bunce 78 (126); Blair Tickner 3/64 (19 overs)
302/5d (62.4 overs); Jesse Ryder 106* (107); Jeet Raval 1/2 (0.4 overs)		169 (57 overs); Ben Horne 46 (95); Ajaz Patel 3/59 (18 overs)

Central Districts won by 256 runs
Saxton Oval, Nelson
Umpires: Chris Brown and Wayne Knights

- Auckland won the toss and elected to field.
- Jesse Ryder (Central Districts) scored his 25th century in first-class cricket.

30 October–2 November 2017
Scorecard

Canterbury	v	Northern Districts
381 (128.5 overs); Cole McConchie 85 (158); Scott Kuggeleijn 3/88 (29 overs)		339 (105.4 overs); Anton Devcich 116 (112); Tim Johnston 5/78 (27 overs)
202 (54.3 overs); Daniel Sams 88 (74); James Baker 3/27 (11 overs)		236 (89.2 overs); Henry Cooper 52 (126); Blake Coburn 7/64 (27.2 overs)

Canterbury won by 8 runs
Mainpower Oval, Rangiora
Umpires: John Bromley and Shaun Haig

- Canterbury won the toss and elected to bat.
- Daniel Sams (Canterbury) made his first-class debut.
- Blake Coburn (Canterbury) took his best figures and his first five-wicket haul in first-class cricket.

30 October–2 November 2017
Scorecard

Wellington	v	Otago
369 (89.1 overs); Stephen Murdoch 114 (187); Neil Wagner 4/80 (24.1 overs)		184 (54.3 overs); Neil Wagner 43 (43); Hamish Bennett 3/31 (12 overs)
		142 (53.3 overs) (f/o); Rob Nicol 39 (68); Hamish Bennett 4/30 (14 overs)

Wellington won by an innings and 43 runs
Basin Reserve, Wellington
Umpires: Ashley Mehrotra and Derek Walker

- Otago won the toss and elected to field.
- Luke Woodcock played in his 128th game for Wellington, the most first-class appearances for a player with one team in New Zealand.

=== Round 3 ===
7–10 November 2017
Scorecard

Wellington	v	Northern Districts
380 (108.2 overs); Stephen Murdoch 97 (203); Brent Arnel 5/73 (34.2 overs)		249 (80.3 overs); Dean Brownlie 82 (132); Logan van Beek 4/60 (21 overs)
158 (46 overs); Fraser Colson 40 (63); James Baker 4/34 (11 overs)		207 (65.3 overs); Dean Brownlie 72 (117); Logan van Beek 6/57 (14.3 overs)

Wellington won by 82 runs
Seddon Park, Hamilton
Umpires: Billy Bowden and Tony Gillies

- Northern Districts won the toss and elected to field.
- Logan van Beek (Wellington) took his maiden 10-wicket match haul in first-class cricket.

7–10 November 2017
Scorecard

Auckland	v	Otago
213 (71 overs); Ben Horne 56 (88); Warren Barnes 4/36 (16 overs)		170 (42.4 overs); Anaru Kitchen 44 (74); Lockie Ferguson 7/34 (15 overs)
277 (111.5 overs); Robert O'Donnell 84 (200); James Neesham 3/46 (17 overs)		185 (62.1 overs); Derek de Boorder 39 (134); Lockie Ferguson 5/44 (19.1 overs)

Auckland won by 135 runs
Eden Park Outer Oval, Auckland
Umpires: John Bromley and Wayne Knights

- Otago won the toss and elected to field.
- Danru Ferns, Ben Lister (Auckland) and Warren Barnes (Otago) all made their first-class debuts.

7–10 November 2017
Scorecard

Canterbury	v	Central Districts
498/7d (129 overs); Greg Hay 140 (250); Daniel Sams 2/97 (28 overs)		194 (64 overs); Michael Pollard 62 (142); Seth Rance 5/32 (15 overs)
		218 (97.2 overs) (f/o); Cole McConchie 56 (150); Blair Tickner 4/41 (18 overs)

Central Districts won by an innings and 86 runs
Hagley Oval, Christchurch
Umpires: Chris Brown and Tim Parlane

- Central Districts won the toss and elected to bat.

=== Round 4 ===
15–18 November 2017
Scorecard

Canterbury	v	Wellington
118 (39.5 overs); Chad Bowes 29 (56); Hamish Bennett 5/14 (10.5 overs)		159 (58.4 overs); Michael Papps 44 (81); Henry Shipley 5/37 (11.4 overs)
156 (45.1 overs); Cam Fletcher 33 (56); Hamish Bennett 5/34 (14 overs)		116/5 (27.2 overs); Michael Papps 48 (67); Will Williams 2/14 (3 overs)

Wellington won by 5 wickets
Basin Reserve, Wellington
Umpires: Billy Bowden and Garth Stirrat

- Wellington won the toss and elected to field.
- Hamish Bennett (Wellington) took his maiden ten-wicket match haul in first-class cricket.
- Andrew Ellis scored his 5,000th run for Canterbury in first-class cricket.

15–18 November 2017
Scorecard

Otago	v	Central Districts
513/7d (139 overs); Hamish Rutherford 142 (247); Adam Milne 3/90 (26 overs)		359 (106.3 overs); Tom Bruce 57 (88); Jacob Duffy 3/84 (25 overs)
177 (35.1 overs); Hamish Rutherford 39 (33); Adam Milne 5/64 (13 overs)		334/8 (83.1 overs); Ross Taylor 90 (154); Jacob Duffy 5/59 (20 overs)

Central Districts won by 2 wickets
University Oval, Dunedin
Umpires: John Dempsey and Tony Gillies

- Otago won the toss and elected to bat.

15–18 November 2017
Scorecard

Northern Districts	v	Auckland
148 (55.5 overs); Mitchell Santner 55 (138); Ben Lister 5/29 (15 overs)		315 (95.2 overs); Michael Guptill-Bunce 62 (129); Scott Kuggeleijn 5/36 (15.2 overs)
238 (93.1 overs); Mitchell Santner 53 (122); Matt McEwan 6/48 (20.1 overs)		75/2 (16.1 overs); Martin Guptill 52* (49); Scott Kuggeleijn 1/24 (3.1 overs)

Auckland won by 8 wickets
Seddon Park, Hamilton
Umpires: Ashley Mehrotra and Tim Parlane

- Auckland won the toss and elected to field.
- Ben Lister (Auckland) took his maiden five-wicket haul in first-class cricket.

=== Round 5 ===
24–27 November 2017
Scorecard

Auckland	v	Canterbury
181 (42.5 overs); Mark Chapman 76 (72); Daniel Sams 4/55 (15.5 overs)		211 (59.4 overs); Daniel Sams 57 (51); Matt McEwan 3/49 (16.4 overs)
345 (71.5 overs); Glenn Phillips 104 (102); Fraser Sheat 3/45 (10 overs)		291 (80.2 overs); Leo Carter 63 (110); Glenn Phillips 3/45 (14 overs)

Auckland won by 24 runs
Eden Park Outer Oval, Auckland
Umpires: John Dempsey and Ashley Mehrotra

- Canterbury won the toss and elected to field.

24–27 November 2017
Scorecard

Northern Districts	v	Otago
456 (137.2 overs); Tim Seifert 167* (230); Anaru Kitchen 3/19 (9.2 overs)		248 (97.5 overs); Hamish Rutherford 67 (161); Brent Arnel 5/76 (28 overs)
135/9d (41 overs); Daryl Mitchell 29 (86); Jacob Duffy 5/49 (12 overs)		318 (98.5 overs); Brad Wilson 111 (228); Ish Sodhi 5/124 (41.5 overs)

Northern Districts won by 25 runs
Molyneux Park, Alexandra
Umpires: Chris Brown and Tim Parlane

- Northern Districts won the toss and elected to bat.

24–27 November 2017
Scorecard

Wellington	v	Central Districts
171 (54.2 overs); Fraser Colson 88 (131); Blair Tickner 4/45 (13.2 overs)		172 (60.4 overs); Dane Cleaver 73 (116); Ian McPeake 5/50 (17 overs)
172 (39.2 overs); Matt Taylor 49 (49); Doug Bracewell 3/22 (10 overs)		172/3 (52 overs); Greg Hay 85* (163); Ian McPeake 2/60 (15 overs)

Central Districts won by 7 wickets
Saxton Oval, Nelson
Umpires: John Bromley and Derek Walker

- Central Districts won the toss and elected to field.
- Lauchie Johns (Wellington) made his first-class debut.
- Blair Tickner (Central Districts) took at hat-trick in the first innings.

=== Round 6 ===
1–4 March 2018
Scorecard

Auckland	v	Northern Districts
339 (94 overs); Glenn Phillips 93 (126); James Baker 6/72 (23 overs)		237 (65 overs); Tim Seifert 78 (92); Matt McEwan 5/60 (20 overs)
199 (69 overs); Sean Solia 45 (87); Brent Arnel 4/58 (22 overs)		161 (57 overs); BJ Watling 45 (105); Ben Lister 4/34 (13 overs)

Auckland won by 140 runs
Eden Park Outer Oval, Auckland
Umpires: John Dempsey and Tim Parlane

- Northern Districts won the toss and elected to field.
- Jamie Brown (Auckland) made his first-class debut.
- Matt McEwan (Auckland) took a hat-trick.

1–4 March 2018
Scorecard

Canterbury	v	Wellington
156 (52 overs); Andrew Ellis 53 (86); Ian McPeake 5/30 (12 overs)		166 (49.5 overs); Stephen Murdoch 38 (37); Kyle Jamieson 5/61 (16 overs)
53 (18.4 overs); Kyle Jamieson 15* (15); Ian McPeake 5/21 (6.4 overs)		44/0 (7.2 overs); Michael Papps 28* (23)

Wellington won by 10 wickets
Hagley Oval, Christchurch
Umpires: Greg Davidson and Billy Bowden

- Wellington won the toss and elected to field.
- Andrew Hazeldine (Canterbury) and Alex Ridley (Wellington) both made their first-class debuts.
- Logan van Beek (Wellington) took a hat-trick.
- Canterbury's second innings total of 53 was their fourth-lowest total in first-class cricket since 1900.

2–5 March 2018
Scorecard

Otago	v	Central Districts
289 (84 overs); Derek de Boorder 73 (165); Seth Rance 5/58 (19 overs)		188 (69.1 overs); Will Young 49 (139); Neil Wagner 5/45 (19 overs)
162 (72.1 overs); Shawn Hicks 42 (129); Ajaz Patel 5/44 (21.1 overs)		264/4 (95.2 overs); Greg Hay 134* (269); Jacob Duffy 1/32 (17 overs)

Central Districts won by 6 wickets
McLean Park, Napier
Umpires: John Bromley and Tony Gillies

- Central Districts won the toss and elected to field.
- Greg Hay (Central Districts) scored his 10th century in first-class cricket.

=== Round 7 ===
9–12 March 2018
Scorecard

Canterbury	v	Northern Districts
193 (72.4 overs); Michael Pollard 48 (114); James Baker 5/52 (23 overs)		409/4d (75 overs); Daniel Flynn 157 (177); Blake Coburn 1/61 (8 overs)
141/2 (42 overs); Chad Bowes 93 (129); Daryl Mitchell 1/33 (8 overs)

Match drawn
Cobham Oval, Whangārei
Umpires: Garth Stirrat and Tim Parlane

- Canterbury won the toss and elected to bat.
- Trevor Garrett (Canterbury) made his first-class debut.

9–12 March 2018
Scorecard

Central Districts	v	Auckland
524 (132.5 overs); Will Young 162 (196); Matt McEwan 3/92 (28.5 overs)		205 (85.5 overs); Glenn Phillips 63 (142); Ajaz Patel 5/42 (28.5 overs)
		181/8 (82 overs) (f/o); Sean Solia 59 (137); Ajaz Patel 5/39 (32 overs)

Match drawn
Eden Park Outer Oval, Auckland
Umpires: Eugene Sanders and Billy Bowden

- Central Districts won the toss and elected to bat.
- Finn Allen (Auckland) made his first-class debut.

10–13 March 2018
Scorecard

Wellington	v	Otago
194 (68.4 overs); Michael Bracewell 58* (117); Mark Craig 4/42 (16.4 overs)		289 (84 overs); James Neesham 93 (111); Jeetan Patel 7/105 (36 overs)
309 (108 overs); Michael Papps 128 (277); Michael Rae 5/18 (8 overs)		196 (80 overs); Neil Broom 43* (109); Ian McPeake 3/44 (14 overs)

Wellington won by 18 runs
University Oval, Dunedin
Umpires: Ashley Mehrotra and Derek Walker

- Wellington won the toss and elected to bat.

=== Round 8 ===
17–20 March 2018
Scorecard

Canterbury	v	Auckland
485/6d (140 overs); Ken McClure 210 (414); Matt McEwan 3/115 (28 overs)		66/6 (49 overs); Sean Solia 17 (103); Will Williams 4/16 (20 overs)

Match drawn
Mainpower Oval, Rangiora
Umpires: Ashley Mehrotra and John Dempsey

- Canterbury won the toss and elected to bat.
- Ken McClure (Canterbury) scored his maiden double century in first-class cricket.
- Cam Fletcher (Canterbury) scored his maiden century in first-class cricket.
- The match was called off in the first over of day three due to an unsafe pitch.

17–20 March 2018
Scorecard

Otago	v	Northern Districts
331 (116.4 overs); Derek de Boorder 89 (185); Ish Sodhi 7/98 (38.4 overs)		227/8d (70.4 overs); Daryl Mitchell 51* (75); Michael Rippon 4/73 (22.4 overs)
101/3 (23 overs); Hamish Rutherford 32 (33); Joe Walker 1/6 (4 overs)

Match drawn
Cobham Oval, Whangārei
Umpires: Eugene Sanders and Tony Gillies

- Otago won the toss and elected to bat.
- Peter Bocock (Northern Districts) made his first-class debut.

17–20 March 2018
Scorecard

Wellington	v	Central Districts
530 (123.1 overs); Malcolm Nofal 179 (245); Willem Ludick 4/102 (26 overs)		423 (124.2 overs); Tom Bruce 89 (131); Jeetan Patel 5/116 (37.2 overs)
264/8d (78 overs); Devon Conway 103* (178); Blair Tickner 4/75 (15 overs)		108/8 (57 overs); Jesse Ryder 39 (80); Ian McPeake 3/23 (12 overs)

Match drawn
Basin Reserve, Wellington
Umpires: Derek Walker and Tim Parlane

- Central Districts won the toss and elected to field.
- Willem Ludick and Felix Murray (Central Districts) both made their first-class debuts.
- Malcolm Nofal (Wellington) scored his maiden century in first-class cricket.

=== Round 9 ===
25–28 March 2018
Scorecard

Wellington	v	Northern Districts
137 (49.3 overs); Luke Woodcock 51 (87); Ish Sodhi 7/30 (15.3 overs)		323 (91.3 overs); Tim Seifert 124 (183); Jeetan Patel 5/85 (26.3 overs)
130 (49.1 overs); Michael Papps 39 (47); Ish Sodhi 5/32 (20.1 overs)

Northern Districts won by an innings and 56 runs
Basin Reserve, Wellington
Umpires: John Dempsey and Tony Gillies

- Northern Districts won the toss and elected to field.

25–28 March 2018
Scorecard

Otago	v	Auckland
305 (82 overs); Jacob Duffy 46 (56); Lockie Ferguson 5/63 (20 overs)		134 (44.5 overs); Matt McEwan 39 (51); Michael Rae 3/24 (10 overs)
		134 (41 overs) (f/o); Mark Chapman 41 (55); Jacob Duffy 5/29 (11 overs)

Otago won by an innings and 37 runs
University Oval, Dunedin
Umpires: Shaun Haig and Garth Stirrat

- Auckland won the toss and elected to field.

25–28 March 2018
Scorecard

Central Districts	v	Canterbury
361/7d (107 overs); Tom Bruce 78* (114); Theo van Woerkom 3/123 (29 overs)		97 (39.4 overs); Michael Davidson 25 (62); Blair Tickner 5/23 (9 overs)
		205 (89.4 overs) (f/o); Cole McConchie 63 (144); Ajaz Patel 5/67 (32.4 overs)

Central Districts won by an innings and 58 runs
McLean Park, Napier
Umpires: Ashley Mehrotra and Billy Bowden

- Central Districts won the toss and elected to bat.
- Jeff Case (Canterbury) made his first-class debut.

=== Round 10 ===
2–5 April 2018
Scorecard

Northern Districts	v	Central Districts
134 (43.4 overs); Scott Kuggeleijn 48* (83); Seth Rance 6/26 (11 overs)		99 (32.5 overs); Seth Rance 33 (25); Scott Kuggeleijn 7/48 (13.5 overs)
483 (126.5 overs); Anton Devcich 106 (76); Ajaz Patel 6/143 (35.5 overs)		284/4 (111.5 overs); Dane Cleaver 87* (179); Brent Arnel 4/35 (24.5 overs)

Match drawn
McLean Park, Napier
Umpires: Tim Parlane and Billy Bowden

- Central Districts won the toss and elected to field.

2–5 April 2018
Scorecard

Canterbury	v	Otago
225 (74.3 overs); Chad Bowes 85 (134); Matthew Bacon 4/55 (20 overs)		264 (84.5 overs); James Neesham 79 (79); Theo van Woerkom 2/30 (14 overs)
304 (99.1 overs); Michael Davidson 101* (231); Warren Barnes 6/64 (18.1 overs)		170 (51.3 overs); James Neesham 42 (57); Fraser Sheat 3/31 (8 overs)

Canterbury won by 95 runs
University Oval, Dunedin
Umpires: John Bromley and Derek Walker

- Otago won the toss and elected to field.

2–5 April 2018
Scorecard

Auckland	v	Wellington
304 (94 overs); Robert O'Donnell 93* (162); Logan van Beek 6/46 (17 overs)		174 (47.2 overs); Ian McPeake 33* (36); Lockie Ferguson 5/63 (16 overs)
163 (51.5 overs); Sean Solia 59 (112); Jeetan Patel 5/37 (13.5 overs)		173 (57.5 overs); Devon Conway 47 (100); Louis Delport 4/42 (22 overs)

Auckland won by 120 runs
Eden Park Outer Oval, Auckland
Umpires: Wayne Knights and Chris Brown

- Wellington won the toss and elected to field.
