= Stefan Hook-Sporry =

New Zealand cricketer (born 1995)

Personal information
- Born: 16 August 1995 (age 31)
- Source: Cricinfo, 1 March 2020

Stefan Hook-Sporry (born 16 August 1995) is a New Zealand cricketer. He made his first-class debut on 1 March 2020, for Central Districts in the 2019–20 Plunket Shield season.
