= Warren Barnes (cricketer) =

New Zealand cricketer (born 1992)

Personal information
- Full name: Warren Dale Barnes
- Born: 8 May 1992 (age 34); Johannesburg, South Africa
- Batting: Right-handed
- Bowling: Right-arm medium fast

Domestic team information
- Years: Team
- 2015/16–2018/19: Otago
- Source: Cricinfo, 3 January 2022

Warren Dale Barnes (born 8 May 1992) is a South African-born New Zealand cricketer who played for Otago. He made his List A debut on 27 December 2015 in the 2015–16 Ford Trophy. He made his first-class debut for Otago in the 2017–18 Plunket Shield season on 7 November 2017.

In December 2017, during a Twenty20 match between Otago and Northern Districts in the 2017–18 Super Smash, Barnes wore a protective helmet when he bowled. This is because it was felt he was particularly vulnerable due to his bowling action. The helmet is based on a hockey mask and was amended by a prosthetics designer in Dunedin to cover the top of the head.

In June 2018, he was awarded a contract with Otago for the 2018–19 season.
