= Andrew Nuttall =

New Zealand cricketer (born 1957)

Personal information
- Born: 7 September 1957 (age 69)
- Source: Cricinfo, 17 March 2020

Andrew Nuttall (born 7 September 1957) is a New Zealand cricketer. He played in 19 first-class and 10 List A matches for Canterbury between 1977 and 1990. In February 2020, he was named in New Zealand's squad for the Over-50s Cricket World Cup in South Africa. However, the tournament was cancelled during the third round of matches due to the COVID-19 pandemic. He recently started playing for the historic willows cricket club situated in Loburn Christchurch, and currently holds the record for the most wickets taken.
