= Tim Seifert =

New Zealand cricketer (born 1994)

Personal information
- Full name: Tim Louis Seifert
- Born: 14 December 1994 (age 31); Whanganui, New Zealand
- Nickname: Bam Bam
- Batting: Right-handed
- Role: Wicket-keeper-batsman

International information
- National side: New Zealand (2018–present)
- ODI debut (cap 195): 3 January 2019 v Sri Lanka
- Last ODI: 15 November 2026 v India
- ODI shirt no.: 43
- T20I debut (cap 78): 13 February 2018 v England
- Last T20I: 1 November 2026 v India
- T20I shirt no.: 43

Domestic team information
- Years: Team
- 2014/15–present: Northern Districts
- 2020: Trinbago Knight Riders
- 2021, 2026: Kolkata Knight Riders
- 2022: Delhi Capitals
- 2022: Sussex
- 2023–present: Galle Marvels
- 2024/25: Melbourne Renegades
- 2025: Karachi Kings
- 2026-present: Manchester Super Giants

Career statistics
Competition	ODI	T20I	FC	LA
Matches	9	95	69	76
Runs scored	169	2,408	3,693	1,970
Batting average	24.14	30.87	32.39	29.40
100s/50s	0/1	0/18	7/19	5/9
Top score	58	97*	167*	109*
Catches/stumpings	16/1	48/13	179/16	99/12
Medal record
Men's Cricket
Representing New Zealand
ICC T20 World Cup
Runner-up	2021 UAE & Oman
Runner-up	2026 India & Sri Lanka
- Source: ESPNcricinfo, 15 November 2026

Tim Seifert (born 14 December 1994) is a New Zealand international cricketer. He was part of New Zealand's squad for the 2014 ICC Under-19 Cricket World Cup, and made his international debut for the New Zealand cricket team in February 2018.

== Domestic and T20 franchise career ==
=== New Zealand domestic ===
In December 2017, Seifert scored the fastest century in a domestic Twenty20 match in New Zealand, batting for Northern Districts against Auckland in the 2017–18 Super Smash. He made 100 runs off 40 deliveries.

He was the leading run-scorer in the 2017–18 Plunket Shield season for Northern Districts, with 703 runs in nine matches. In June 2018, he was awarded a contract with Northern Districts for the 2018–19 season.

=== Indian Premier League (IPL) ===
In October 2020, he replaced the injured Ali Khan in the Kolkata Knight Riders team in the 2020 Indian Premier League (IPL), but did not play a match during the competition. Seifert was retained in the Kolkata squad for the following season's IPL but did not play before the suspension of the league in May during the COVID-19 pandemic. His departure from India was delayed after he tested positive for the virus.

In February 2022, he was bought by the Delhi Capitals in the auction for the 2022 Indian Premier League tournament.

=== Lanka Premier League (LPL) ===
In July 2022, he was signed by the Dambulla Giants for the third edition of the Lanka Premier League (LPL). In June 2023, he was bought by the Galle Titans for the 2023 Lanka Premier League.

The Galle Marvels retained him in their squad for the 2024 Lanka Premier League. Tim Seifert emerged as a key player for his team. He scored 400 runs in ten matches at an average of 57.14. His consistent and aggressive batting style was instrumental in the Galle Marvels' campaign, leading him to finish as the tournament's leading run-scorer and win the Green Cap.

=== Caribbean Premier League (CPL) ===
In July 2020, he was named in the Trinbago Knight Riders squad for the 2020 Caribbean Premier League.

In 2025, he was signed by the Saint Lucia Kings for the 2025 Caribbean Premier League. His CPL 2025 campaign has been highlighted by a record-equalling century for the Saint Lucia Kings against the Antigua and Barbuda Falcons on August 31, 2025, at Gros Islet. Seifert smashed an unbeaten 125 runs off 53 balls, reaching his century in a blistering 40 balls, which equalled Andre Russell's record for the fastest century in CPL history.

=== The Hundred ===
During the 2026 Men's 100, Seifert hit 394 runs in 10 innings batting for the Manchester Super Giants. He won the player of the match in the final and the player of the series award, as the Super Giants won their first title.

== International career ==
In February 2018, Seifert was added to New Zealand's T20 International (T20I) squad for the 2017–18 Trans-Tasman Tri-Series, making his debut for New Zealand against England on 13 February 2018. In December 2018, he was named in New Zealand's One Day International (ODI) squad for their series against Sri Lanka, going on to make his ODI debut during the series in January 2019.

In August 2021, Seifert was named in New Zealand's squad for the 2021 ICC Men's T20 World Cup.

In August 2023, Seifert was selected for New Zealand's T20I tour of the UAE and the T20I leg of New Zealand's tour of England.

In Feb 2024, Seifert came in as wicket keeper to replace the injured Conway, against Australia, in the 3rd T20I.

In the 2026 ICC Men's T20 World Cup, Tim Seifert and Finn Allen set a tournament record by scoring a 175-run opening partnership against the United Arab Emirates in Chennai. On 4 March 2026, in the ICC Men's T20 World Cup semi-final against South Africa, Seifert scored 58 runs off 33 balls in Kolkata. He top scored for the losing New Zealand team in the final, scoring 52 off 26 balls.
