= Greg Hay =

New Zealand cricketer (born 1984)

Personal information
- Full name: Gregory Robert Hay
- Born: 14 July 1984 (age 42); Rotorua, New Zealand
- Batting: Right-handed
- Bowling: Right-arm off break
- Role: Batsman

Domestic team information
- Years: Team
- 2006/07–2023-24: Central Districts
- FC debut: 21 November 2006 Central Districts v Wellington
- Last FC: 24 March 2024 Central Districts v Otago cricket team
- LA debut: 23 December 2006 Central Districts v Wellington
- Last LA: 9 February 2020 Central Districts v Canterbury cricket team

Career statistics
| Competition | FC | LA | T20 |
|---|---|---|---|
| Matches | 106 | 32 | 27 |
| Runs scored | 7,240 | 1,089 | 508 |
| Batting average | 42.09 | 40.33 | 26.73 |
| 100s/50s | 18/34 | 0/7 | 0/4 |
| Top score | 226 | 85 | 76 |
| Balls bowled | 282 | – | 3 |
| Wickets | 2 | – | 0 |
| Bowling average | 100.50 | – | – |
| 5 wickets in innings | 0 | – | – |
| 10 wickets in match | 0 | – | – |
| Best bowling | 1/8 | – | – |
| Catches/stumpings | 54/– | 7/– | 10/– |
- Source: Cricinfo, 11 April 2024

Gregory Robert Hay (born 14 July 1984) is a New Zealand cricketer who played for Central Districts (officially known as the Central Stags) and for Nelson in the Hawke Cup competition until his retirement in March 2024.

He is one of just two men to have lifted the Plunket Shield twice as the Central Stags captain, and retired as one of only two Central Stags players to have scored more than 7,000 first-class runs for his team.

== Playing career ==
After scoring 98 not out on first-class debut, Hay scored 55 on List A debut. His early career was punctuated by four seasons in which he did not play representative cricket at all, but after his return to the Central Stags in 2013/14, he enjoyed the most productive and successful years of his career.

Hay also represented New Zealand A and played for and captained Bath Cricket Club in Somerset, England, and played in Minor League Cricket for the San Diego Surf Riders.

He was the leading run-scorer in the 2017–18 Plunket Shield season for the Central Stags with 786 runs in nine matches, and again in the 2023-24 Plunket Shield season with 643 runs from eight matches, scoring two centuries in his final season and finishing in the top three runscorers nationally. In June 2018, he was awarded a contract with Central Districts for the 2018–19 season. He was also the leading run-scorer for Central Districts in the 2018–19 Ford Trophy, with 351 runs in eight matches.

Hay was selected by the San Diego Surf Riders for the 2022 edition of Minor League Cricket. He scored an unbeaten 110 off 60 runs in his 7th appearance in a loss to the Bay Blazers.
