= Edward Nuttall =

New Zealander cricketer (born 1993)

Personal information
- Full name: Edward James Nuttall
- Born: 15 July 1993 (age 33); Christchurch, New Zealand
- Batting: Left-handed
- Bowling: Left-arm fast-medium
- Role: Bowler
- Relatives: Andrew Nuttall (father)

Domestic team information
- Years: Team
- 2011/12–2023/24: Canterbury

Career statistics
Competition	FC	LA	T20
Matches	44	54	77
Runs scored	151	42	47
Batting average	9.43	4.66	11.75
100s/50s	0/0	0/0	0/0
Top score	24*	13	13*
Balls bowled	6,472	2,283	1,489
Wickets	134	73	73
Bowling average	31.76	28.72	29.36
5 wickets in innings	4	0	0
10 wickets in match	0	–	–
Best bowling	6/35	4/50	3/13
Catches/stumpings	14/–	14/–	22/–
- Source: Cricinfo, 6 October 2026

Edward James Nuttall (born 15 July 1993) is a cricketer from New Zealand who played for Canterbury from 2011–12 to 2023–24.

Nuttall was born in Christchurch, where he attended Canterbury Boys' High School. His father, Andrew Nuttall, also played first-class cricket for Canterbury.

A left-arm fast bowler, Nuttall represented New Zealand in the 2011 ICC Under-19 Cricket World Cup. In June 2018, he was awarded a contract with Canterbury for the 2018–19 season. In June 2020, he was offered a contract by Canterbury ahead of the 2020–21 domestic cricket season. He also played Hawke Cup cricket for Canterbury Country.

Nuttall's best first-class bowling figures were 6 for 35 in the last match of the 2014–15 Plunket Shield, when Canterbury's victory over Northern Districts gave Canterbury the title.

Nuttall announced his retirement in October 2026 and took up a position in the insurance industry.
