= Malcolm Nofal =

South African cricketer

Personal information
- Born: 18 September 1991 (age 33)
- Batting: Left-handed
- Bowling: Slow left-arm orthodox
- Role: Allrounder

Domestic team information
- Years: Team
- 2010–2014: Gauteng
- 2017–2020: Wellington
- 2021–present: Limpopo
- Source: Cricinfo, 27 January 2022

Malcolm Nofal (born 18 September 1991) is a South African cricketer. He made his first-class debut for Gauteng in the 2010–11 CSA Provincial Three-Day Challenge on 28 October 2010 and played for the South Africa Under-19s at the 2010 Under-19 Cricket World Cup in New Zealand.

In January 2018, he scored his first century in List A cricket, while playing for Wellington in the 2017–18 Ford Trophy in New Zealand. In March 2018, he scored his maiden century in first-class cricket, batting for Wellington in the 2017–18 Plunket Shield season. He went on to score 179 runs before being dismissed. In June 2018, he was awarded a contract with Wellington for the 2018–19 season.

Nofal emigrated to Wellington, New Zealand in 2015 after finding it too difficult to break through in South African cricket. However, he returned to South Africa in 2020, and signed to play in the Leinster League in Ireland for the 2022 season.
