= Will Williams =

New Zealand cricketer

Personal information
- Full name: William Salter Austen Williams
- Born: 6 October 1992 (age 34); Christchurch, New Zealand
- Batting: Right-handed
- Bowling: Right-arm medium-fast
- Role: Bowler

Domestic team information
- Years: Team
- 2012/13–2021/22: Canterbury
- 2022–2025: Lancashire
- 2026–: Gloucestershire
- First-class debut: 12 November 2012 Canterbury v Otago
- List A debut: 18 January 2017 Canterbury v Northern Districts

Career statistics
Competition	FC	LA	T20
Matches	88	65	39
Runs scored	1,165	224	80
Batting average	12.94	10.18	26.66
100s/50s	0/2	0/0	0/0
Top score	98	21	29*
Balls bowled	14,610	3,105	537
Wickets	251	85	30
Bowling average	24.09	30.82	28.60
5 wickets in innings	4	0	1
10 wickets in match	0	0	0
Best bowling	6/24	4/20	5/12
Catches/stumpings	37/–	26/–	26/–
- Source: ESPNcricinfo, 11 September 2026

William Salter Austen Williams (born 6 October 1992) is a New Zealand and English cricketer. He made his List A debut for Canterbury on 18 January 2017 in the 2016–17 Ford Trophy. He made his Twenty20 debut for Canterbury in the 2017–18 Super Smash on 14 December 2017.

A right-arm medium-fast bowler, Williams was the leading wicket-taker in the 2017–18 Plunket Shield season for Canterbury, with 19 dismissals in eight matches. In June 2018, he was awarded a contract with Canterbury for the 2018–19 season. On 9 January 2020, in the 2019–20 Super Smash against the Wellington Firebirds, Williams took a hat-trick.

In June 2020, he was offered a contract by Canterbury ahead of the 2020–21 domestic cricket season. In October 2020, in the second round of the 2020–21 Plunket Shield season, Williams took his first five-wicket haul in first-class cricket. In the next round of the tournament, he took another five-wicket haul, with 5/26 against Northern Districts.

In June 2022, Williams was signed on a short-term overseas contract by Lancashire County Cricket Club to play in the County Championship in England. The following month, Williams was signed as a local player by Lancashire until the end of the 2025 season, ending his Canterbury career.

In August 2025, it was announced that Williams would be moving to Gloucestershire after signing a three-year contract with the club starting in 2026.

In addition to his cricketing career, Williams is also a pilot.
