= Brad Schmulian =

New Zealand cricketer

Bradley Dean Schmulian
Personal information
- Born: 3 August 1990 (age 36); Cape Town, South Africa
- Batting: Right handed
- Bowling: Right arm Leg spin
- Role: All-rounder

Domestic team information
- Years: Team
- 2016/17–present: Central Districts

Career statistics
Competition	First-class	List A
Matches	58	50
Runs scored	3,735	1,795
Batting average	41.04	46.02
100s/50s	8/19	4/11
Top score	203	136*
Balls bowled	2,492	526
Wickets	45	7
Bowling average	28.40	84.57
5 wickets in innings	0	0
10 wickets in match	0	0
Best bowling	4/34	3/39
Catches/stumpings	26/–	9/–
- Source: Cricinfo, 31 December 2025

Bradley Dean Schmulian (born 3 August 1990) is a New Zealand cricketer who plays for Central Districts.

== Early life ==
He was born in Cape Town, South Africa, and moved to New Zealand at the age of nine. Schmulian was awarded the Auckland Cricket Association Men's Player of the Year in 2011/12, 2012/13 and 2015/16. He made a move to Hawke’s Bay from Auckland in November 2016 when he was not getting the opportunity in the Auckland cricket provincial setup. Schmulian played club cricket in Australia for the Waratah's club in Darwin. He picked up the coveted Ralph Wiese Medal and Premier Grade Cricketer Of The Year award in Darwin in 2017 with an average of 89.13 runs for the season.

== Domestic career ==
He made his first-class debut for Central Districts in the 2017–18 Plunket Shield season on 23 October 2017. In the match, he scored 203 runs in the first innings, the highest total on debut in first-class cricket in New Zealand. The previous highest total for a player on debut in a New Zealand first-class match was 175, made by George Watson in the 1880–81 season. He is the first player from New Zealand to score a double century on first-class debut. He made his List A debut on 27 November 2019, for Central Districts in the 2019–20 Ford Trophy.

== See also ==
- List of double centuries scored on first-class cricket debut
