= Matt McEwan =

New Zealander cricketer (born 1991)

Personal information
- Full name: Matthew Brook McEwan
- Born: 15 February 1991 (age 35); Christchurch, New Zealand
- Relatives: Paul McEwan (father)
- Source: Cricinfo, 30 October 2015

Matthew Brook McEwan (born 15 February 1991) is a New Zealand cricketer who plays for Auckland. In March 2018, in round six of the 2017–18 Plunket Shield season, he took a hat-trick for Auckland against Northern Districts.

He was the leading wicket-taker in the 2017–18 Plunket Shield season for Auckland, with 36 dismissals in nine matches. In June 2018, he was awarded a contract with Auckland for the 2018–19 season. In September 2018, he was named in the Auckland Aces' squad for the 2018 Abu Dhabi T20 Trophy.

In June 2020, he was offered a contract by Auckland ahead of the 2020–21 domestic cricket season.
