= Stephen Murdoch =

New Zealander cricketer (born 1983)

Personal information
- Full name: Stephen Joseph Murdoch
- Born: 6 August 1983 (age 43); Wellington, New Zealand
- Batting: Right-handed

Career statistics
Competition	FC	LA	T20
Matches	83	61	49
Runs scored	5306	2042	976
Batting average	37.10	36.46	24.40
100s/50s	13/31	5/12	0/7
Top score	171	136	92*
Balls bowled	14	–	–
Wickets	1	–	–
Bowling average	13.00	–	–
5 wickets in innings	0	–	–
10 wickets in match	0	–	–
Best bowling	1/0	–	–
Catches/stumpings	53/–	22/–	21/–
- Source: Cricinfo, 9 November 2019

Stephen Murdoch (born 6 August 1983) is a New Zealand cricketer who has played for Wellington and Canterbury.

After playing for Wellington from 2009–10 to 2017–18, in June 2018 Murdoch was awarded a contract with Canterbury for the 2018–19 season. In February 2019, in the 2018–19 Plunket Shield season, Murdoch scored his 5,000th run in the Plunket Shield.

Batting in his usual position at number three, Murdoch hit his highest first-class score of 171 for Wellington against Central Districts in Nelson in 2015–16. He made his highest List A score in 2012-13 when Wellington were chasing Otago's total of 349; going to the wicket at 6 for 1 he made 136 off 124 balls, adding 273 for the second wicket with Michael Papps, and Wellington went on to win with eight balls to spare.
