= Cam Fletcher =

New Zealander cricketer (born 1993)

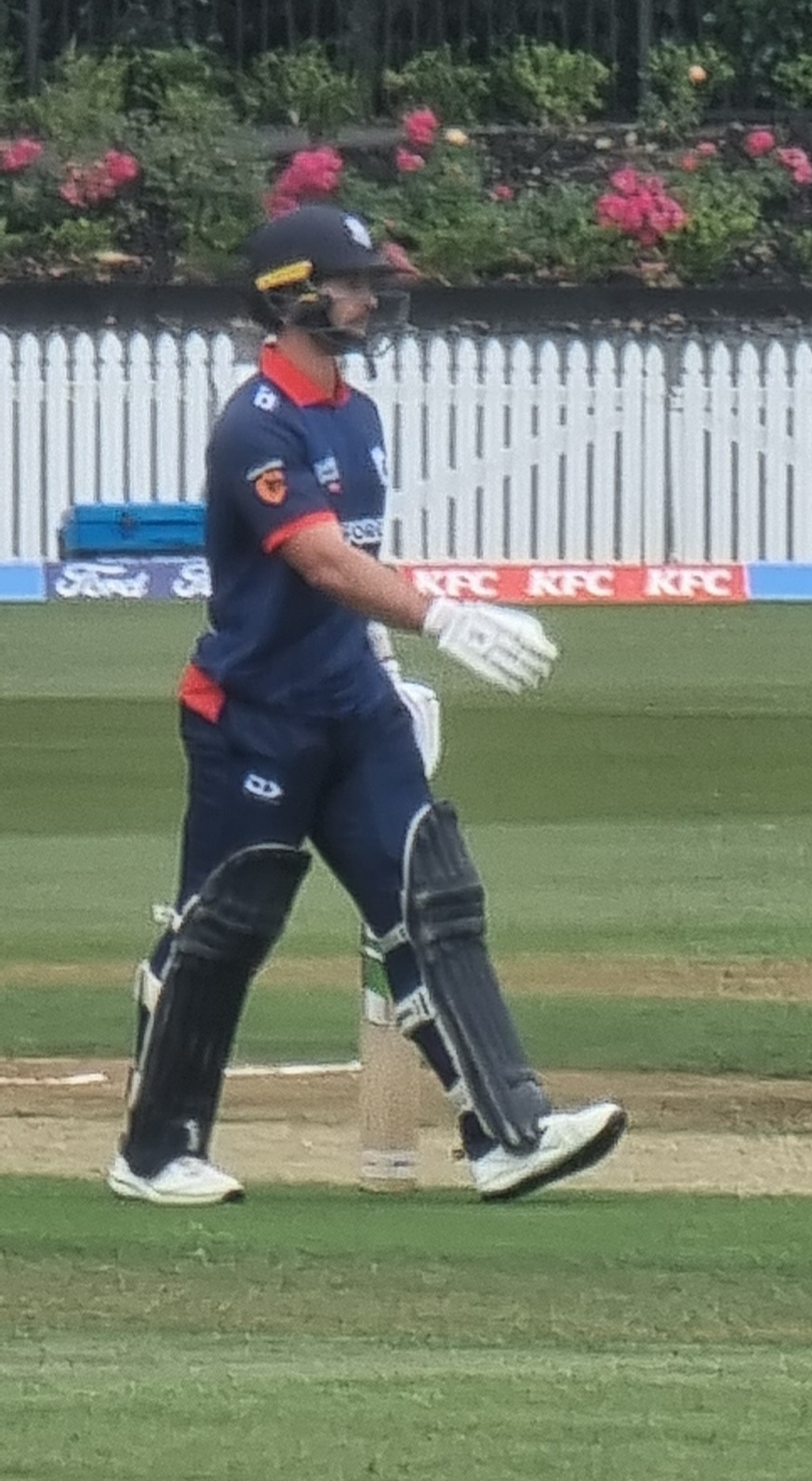
- Fletcher playing for the Auckland Aces in 2025.

Personal information
- Full name: Cameron Dean Fletcher
- Born: 1 March 1993 (age 33); Auckland, New Zealand
- Batting: Right-handed
- Role: Wicket-keeper-batter

Domestic team information
- Years: Team
- 2012/13–2013/14: Northern Districts
- 2014/15–2022/23: Canterbury
- 2023: Glamorgan
- 2023/24–present: Auckland
- 2024: Derbyshire

Career statistics
Competition	FC	LA	T20
Matches	87	91	113
Runs scored	3,663	1,608	2,090
Batting average	33.00	30.33	33.17
100s/50s	6/18	0/7	0/11
Top score	157	86*	74*
Catches/stumpings	272/17	100/11	77/21
- Source: Cricinfo, 15 January 2025

Cameron Dean Fletcher (born 1 March 1993) is a New Zealand cricketer who currently plays for Auckland. He has previously represented Canterbury and Northern Districts.

== Early life ==
Cameron Fletcher was born in Auckland, New Zealand. As a teenager he attended Kelston Boys' High School.

== Domestic career ==
Fletcher began his domestic career with Northern Districts, making his First-class and List A debuts for them in February 2013.

He was then awarded a contract to play for Canterbury for the 2014–15 season.

In March 2018, in the 2017–18 Plunket Shield season, Fletcher scored his maiden century in first-class cricket. In June 2018, he was awarded a contract with Canterbury for the 2018–19 season. In June 2020, Fletcher was offered a contract by Canterbury ahead of the 2020–21 domestic cricket season.

Ahead of the 2023/24 season, Fletcher signed with Auckland, after spending 10 years with Canterbury.

In 2024, Fletcher joined Derbyshire for the Vitality Blast, having represented Glamorgan in the previous year's tournament.

== International career ==
=== New Zealand Under-19 ===
In 2012, Fletcher was named in the New Zealand Under-19 squad, alongside future Black Caps Will Young, Ish Sodhi and Jacob Duffy. The squad went to Australia for both a quadrangular series against England, India and the hosts, and the Under-19 World Cup. He scored 49 in a last-ball victory over the West Indies in the quarter-finals, and 53 as New Zealand were beaten by India in the semi-finals.

=== New Zealand ===
In February 2022, Fletcher was named in New Zealand's Test squad for their series against South Africa. In May 2022, he was named in New Zealand's Test squad for their tour of England. However, he did not play in either series.

=== New Zealand A ===
In August 2022, Fletcher was named in the New Zealand A squad to tour India.
