= Iain McPeake =

New Zealand cricketer (born 1991)

Personal information
- Born: 24 May 1991 (age 35); Lower Hutt, New Zealand
- Source: Cricinfo, 8 March 2016

Iain McPeake (born 24 May 1991) is a New Zealand cricketer. He made his first-class debut for Wellington on 8 March 2016 in the 2015–16 Plunket Shield. He made his List A debut for Wellington on 27 January 2017 in the 2016–17 Ford Trophy. He made his Twenty20 debut for Wellington in the 2017–18 Super Smash on 24 December 2017.

In June 2018, he was awarded a contract with Wellington for the 2018–19 season. In June 2020, he was offered a contract by Wellington ahead of the 2020–21 domestic cricket season.
