= Andrew Hazeldine =

New Zealand cricketer (born 1994)

Personal information
- Full name: Andrew Thomas Edward Hazeldine
- Born: 13 July 1994 (age 32); Portsmouth, Hampshire, England
- Batting: Left-handed
- Bowling: Left-arm fast
- Role: Bowler

Domestic team information
- Years: Team
- 2017/18–2021/22: Canterbury
- 2022/23–: Otago
- FC debut: 1 March 2018 Canterbury v Wellington
- LA debut: 31 October 2018 Canterbury v Auckland

Career statistics
| Competition | FC | LA | T20 |
|---|---|---|---|
| Matches | 22 | 32 | 24 |
| Runs scored | 427 | 241 | 61 |
| Batting average | 14.72 | 16.06 | 6.77 |
| 100s/50s | 0/0 | 0/1 | 0/0 |
| Top score | 41 | 54* | 12* |
| Balls bowled | 2,730 | 1,432 | 414 |
| Wickets | 46 | 44 | 22 |
| Bowling average | 44.97 | 32.34 | 26.31 |
| 5 wickets in innings | 1 | 1 | 0 |
| 10 wickets in match | 0 | 0 | 0 |
| Best bowling | 5/33 | 5/36 | 3/20 |
| Catches/stumpings | 7/– | 10/– | 4/– |
- Source: CricInfo, 9 April 2025

Andrew Thomas Edward Hazeldine (born 13 July 1994) is a cricketer. He holds dual British and New Zealand citizenship. He made his Twenty20 debut for Canterbury in the 2017–18 Super Smash on 17 December 2017. He made his first-class debut for Canterbury in the 2017–18 Plunket Shield season on 1 March 2018. In June 2018, he was awarded a contract with Canterbury for the 2018–19 season. He made his List A debut for Canterbury in the 2018–19 Ford Trophy on 31 October 2018.

In June 2020, he was offered a contract by Canterbury ahead of the 2020–21 domestic cricket season. However, in September 2020, Hazeldine was diagnosed with Hodgkin's Lymphoma, ruling him out of the season.
