= Anurag Verma =

New Zealander cricketer (born 1990)

- Born: August 5, 1990 (age 36); Hamilton, New Zealand

Anurag Verma (born 5 August 1990) is a New Zealand cricketer who plays for Wellington. He is a right-handed middle-order batsman and right-arm medium-fast bowler. He had previously played first-class, List-A and Twenty20 games for Northern Districts. After making his debut as a substitute against Otago in Dunedin on 20 November 2011, he took 7-82 against Auckland in Hamilton in his first full match.

He played his first competitive match in early 2007, taking 3 for 54 against Canterbury Country in the Hawke Cup. In December 2007 he was called up for the Under-19 v NZCPA Masters fixture, where he dismissed former New Zealand opener Matt Horne. He was subsequently included in the squad for the Under-19 World Cup in Malaysia.

He has been contracted to play for the Wellington Firebirds for the 2015–16 season.
