= James Baker (New Zealand cricketer) =

New Zealander cricketer (born 1988)

Personal information
- Full name: James David Baker
- Born: 16 February 1988 (age 38); Tokoroa, New Zealand
- Batting: Right-handed
- Bowling: Right-arm medium-fast

International information
- National side: Samoa
- T20I debut (cap 1): 8 July 2019 v PNG
- Last T20I: 15 September 2022 v Fiji

Domestic team information
- Years: Team
- 2010/11–2020/21: Northern Districts

Career statistics
Competition	T20I	FC	LA
Matches	10	76	15
Runs scored	68	592	94
Batting average	22.66	11.60	31.33
100s/50s	0/0	0/0	0/0
Top score	40*	41*	48
Balls bowled	144	12,600	708
Wickets	6	201	20
Bowling average	31.50	29.65	37.75
5 wickets in innings	0	7	0
10 wickets in match	0	1	0
Best bowling	2/32	6/72	3/30
Catches/stumpings	6/–	24/–	4/–
- Source: Cricinfo, 17 January 2023

James Baker (born 16 February 1988) is a Somoan cricketer who plays for Northern Districts and captains the Samoa cricket team. He was the leading wicket-taker in the 2017–18 Plunket Shield season for Northern Districts, with 34 dismissals in ten matches. In June 2018, he was awarded a contract with Northern Districts for the 2018–19 season.

In June 2019, he was selected to represent the Samoa cricket team in the men's tournament at the 2019 Pacific Games. He made his Twenty20 International (T20I) debut against Papua New Guinea, on 8 July 2019. Samoa's 157-run victory against New Caledonia in the tournament's bronze medal match earned Baker a bronze medal.
