= Hamish Rutherford =

New Zealand cricketer

Personal information
- Full name: Hamish Duncan Rutherford
- Born: 27 April 1989 (age 37); Dunedin, Otago, New Zealand
- Batting: Left-handed
- Bowling: Slow left-arm orthodox
- Role: Opening batsman
- Relatives: Ken Rutherford (father); Ian Rutherford (uncle)

International information
- National side: New Zealand (2013–2019)
- Test debut (cap 260): 6 March 2013 v England
- Last Test: 3 January 2015 v Sri Lanka
- ODI debut (cap 179): 20 February 2013 v England
- Last ODI: 31 October 2013 v Bangladesh
- T20I debut (cap 61): 9 February 2013 v England
- Last T20I: 6 September 2019 v Sri Lanka

Domestic team information
- Years: Team
- 2008/09–2023/24: Otago (squad no. 7)
- 2013: Essex
- 2015–2016: Derbyshire
- 2019–2020: Worcestershire
- 2021: Glamorgan
- 2022: Leicestershire

Career statistics
Competition	Test	ODI	FC	LA
Matches	16	4	130	127
Runs scored	755	15	7,863	4,326
Batting average	26.96	3.75	35.26	37.61
100s/50s	1/1	0/0	17/40	13/19
Top score	171	11	239	155
Balls bowled	6	–	222	66
Wickets	0	–	1	1
Bowling average	–	–	113.00	54.00
5 wickets in innings	–	–	0	0
10 wickets in match	–	–	0	0
Best bowling	–	–	1/26	1/4
Catches/stumpings	11/–	2/–	76/–	34/–
- Source: CricInfo, 28 January 2024

Hamish Duncan Rutherford (born 27 April 1989) is a New Zealand former professional cricketer who played first-class cricket for Otago and represented New Zealand in international cricket. A left-handed batsman and occasional left-arm spin bowler, Rutherford is the son of former New Zealand Test captain Ken Rutherford and nephew of Ian Rutherford. He was born at Dunedin in 1989 and educated at Otago Boys' High School in the city.

== Domestic career ==
Rutherford made his senior representative debut for Otago during the 2008–09 season. He was the leading run-scorer in the 2017–18 Plunket Shield season for Otago, with 577 runs in ten matches. In June 2018, he was awarded a contract with Otago for the 2018–19 season. He was also the leading run-scorer for Otago in the 2018–19 Ford Trophy, with 393 runs in seven matches, and the leading run-scorer for the team in the 2018–19 Super Smash, with 227 runs in nine matches.

In June 2020, he was offered a contract by Otago ahead of the 2020–21 domestic cricket season. As well as Otago he played County Cricket in the UK for Essex in 2013, Derbyshire in 2015 and 2016, Worcestershire in 2019 and 2020, Glamorgan in 2021 and Leicestershire in 2022.

On 18 January 2024, Rutherford announced he would retire from all forms of cricket at the end of Otago's 2023–24 Super Smash campaign at the end of the month. He played in more than 450 senior matches, including more than 280 for Otago.

== International career ==
Rutherford scored 171 runs on his Test match debut against England in March 2013, at the time the seventh-highest score on debut. It was the second highest score by an opening batsman in their Test debut. The score was the only century of his international career.

Rutherford had made his Twenty20 International (T20I) and One Day International (ODI) debut site previous month, also against England. He went on to play a total of 16 Test matches, four ODIs and eight T20Is in an international career that lasted until 2019.

== Concussion issues ==
Rutherford suffered a number of concussions playing cricket. The most recent occurred in December 2020 during training resulting in him missing several games for Otago. He had previously been hit while batting by Jofra Archer in 2019 and by Lockie Ferguson during the 2019–20 New Zealand domestic one-day final and in 2015 by Scott Kuggeleijn, a ball that resulted in Rutherford taking three months off cricket to recover.
