= Wayne Knights =

Cricket umpire

Personal information
- Full name: Wayne Roger Knights
- Born: 25 August 1970 (age 56); Auckland, New Zealand
- Role: Umpire

Umpiring information
- Tests umpired: 4 (2020–2022)
- ODIs umpired: 27 (2016–2025)
- T20Is umpired: 53 (2017–2026)
- WODIs umpired: 4 (2008–2015)
- WT20Is umpired: 6 (2010–2018)
- Source: Cricinfo, 19 June 2023

Wayne Roger Knights (born 25 August 1970) is a New Zealand cricket umpire. Along with Tim Parlane, Knights umpired the final of the 2015–16 Ford Trophy, in January 2016. He was added to the ICC International Panel of Umpires in June 2016. He stood in his first One Day International (ODI) match, between New Zealand and Bangladesh, on 26 December 2016.

Knights made his Twenty20 International (T20I) umpiring debut in a match on 3 January 2017, also between New Zealand and Bangladesh. He was one of the twelve on-field umpires for the 2018 ICC Women's World Twenty20. He was named as one of the sixteen umpires in January 2020, for the 2020 Under-19 Cricket World Cup, in South Africa. He stood in his first Test match on 3 December 2020, between New Zealand and the West Indies.

In January 2023, he was named as one of the on-field umpires for the 2023 ICC Under-19 Women's T20 World Cup.

== See also ==
- List of Test cricket umpires
- List of One Day International cricket umpires
- List of Twenty20 International cricket umpires
