= Seth Rance =

New Zealander cricketer

Personal information
- Full name: Seth Hayden Arnold Rance
- Born: 23 August 1987 (age 39); Wellington, New Zealand
- Batting: Right-handed
- Bowling: Right-arm fast-medium
- Role: Bowler

International information
- National side: New Zealand (2017–2019)
- ODI debut (cap 192): 14 May 2017 v Ireland
- Last ODI: 17 May 2017 v Bangladesh
- T20I debut (cap 76): 29 December 2017 v West Indies
- Last T20I: 6 September 2019 v Sri Lanka

Domestic team information
- Years: Team
- 2008/09–2022/23: Central Districts

Career statistics
Competition	ODI	T20I	FC	LA
Matches	2	8	49	72
Runs scored	–	10	910	283
Batting average	–	3.33	17.50	10.48
100s/50s	–	0/0	0/4	0/0
Top score	–	8	71	45
Balls bowled	105	162	8,017	3,286
Wickets	1	10	152	114
Bowling average	110.00	24.50	27.55	23.91
5 wickets in innings	0	0	7	0
10 wickets in match	0	0	0	0
Best bowling	1/44	3/26	6/26	4/25
Catches/stumpings	3/–	0/–	17/–	16/–
- Source: Cricinfo, 4 October 2024

Seth Rance (born 23 August 1987) is a New Zealand cricketer who played domestically for Central Districts (the Central Stags) until late 2022. He made his international debut for the New Zealand cricket team in May 2017.

== Domestic career ==
Along with Brent Arnel, he was the joint-highest wicket-taker in the 2016–17 Super Smash, with fifteen dismissals. In June 2018, he was awarded a contract with Central Districts for the 2018–19 season.

In December 2021, in the 2021–22 Super Smash, Rance took his first five-wicket haul in T20 cricket.

Renowned for his prodigious late in-swing deliveries, Rance announced his retirement from New Zealand Domestic representative cricket in April 2024, citing the ruptured latissimus dorsi tendon he suffered in December 2022 as one of the main reasons.

== International career ==
In April 2017, he was named in New Zealand's One Day International (ODI) squad for the 2017 Ireland Tri-Nation Series. He made his ODI debut for New Zealand against Ireland on 14 May 2017. He made his T20I debut for New Zealand against the West Indies on 29 December 2017.
