= Jacob Duffy =

New Zealand cricketer (born 1994)

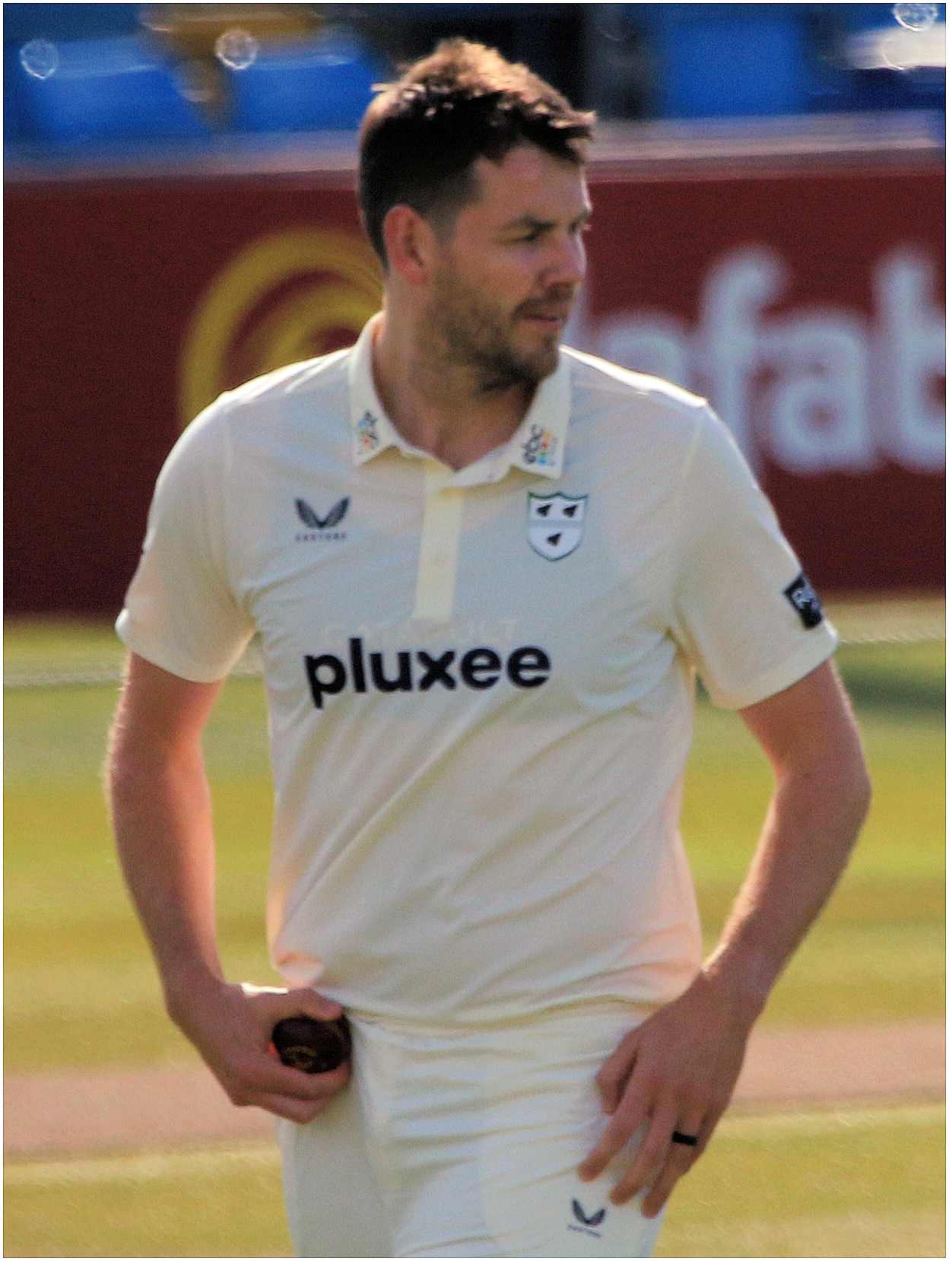
- Duffy playing for Worcestershire in 2025

Personal information
- Full name: Jacob Andrew Duffy
- Born: 2 August 1994 (age 32); Lumsden, Southland, New Zealand
- Batting: Right-handed
- Bowling: Right-arm fast-medium
- Role: Bowler
- Relatives: Ryan Duffy (brother)

International information
- National side: New Zealand (2020–present)
- Test debut (cap 289): 7 August 2025 v Zimbabwe
- Last Test: 18 December 2025 v West Indies
- ODI debut (cap 205): 12 July 2022 v Ireland
- Last ODI: 15 November 2026 v India
- ODI shirt no.: 27
- T20I debut (cap 86): 18 December 2020 v Pakistan
- Last T20I: 1 November 2026 v India
- T20I shirt no.: 27

Domestic team information
- Years: Team
- 2011/12–present: Otago
- 2011/12–2017/18: Southland
- 2022: Kent
- 2024: Nottinghamshire
- 2025: Worcestershire
- 2025: Northern Superchargers
- 2026: Royal Challengers Bengaluru

Career statistics
Competition	Test	ODI	T20I	FC
Matches	4	28	52	112
Runs scored	78	43	40	1,526
Batting average	19.50	10.75	8.00	13.15
100s/50s	0/0	0/0	0/0	0/3
Top score	36	15*	9*	71
Balls bowled	1,030	1,169	1,009	20,753
Wickets	25	49	67	343
Bowling average	16.28	23.59	20.76	31.58
5 wickets in innings	3	0	0	16
10 wickets in match	0	0	0	0
Best bowling	5/34	3/35	4/14	7/89
Catches/stumpings	2/–	6/–	15/–	44/–
Medal record
Men's Cricket
Representing New Zealand
ICC T20 World Cup
Runner-up	2026 India & Sri Lanka
ICC Champions Trophy
Runner-up	2025 Pakistan
- Source: Cricinfo, 15 November 2026

Jacob Duffy (born 2 August 1994) is a cricketer who plays for New Zealand and Otago in Domestic cricket. Duffy made his senior debut in an HRV Cup match against Northern Districts in January 2012. He made his international debut for the New Zealand cricket team in December 2020.

== Early life and education ==
Duffy was born at Lumsden in the Southland Region and was educated at Southland Boys' High School in Invercargill.

== Career ==
Duffy playing a Test match for New Zealand against India in November 2026

Duffy was the joint-leading wicket-taker in the 2017–18 Plunket Shield season for Otago, with 29 dismissals in eight matches. In June 2018, he was awarded a contract with Otago for the 2018–19 season. He was the leading wicket-taker for Otago in the 2018–19 Ford Trophy, with 25 dismissals in eleven matches. He was the joint-leading wicket-taker for Otago in the 2018–19 Super Smash, with thirteen dismissals in nine matches.

In June 2020, Duffy was offered a contract by Otago ahead of the 2020–21 domestic cricket season.

In November 2020, Duffy was named in the New Zealand A cricket team for practice matches against the touring West Indies team. The following month, he was named in New Zealand's Twenty20 International (T20I) squad for their series against Pakistan. He made his T20I debut for New Zealand on 18 December 2020, against Pakistan. He took 4 wickets for 33 from his four overs, and was named the player of the match.

In April 2021, Duffy was named in New Zealand's Test squad for their series against England, and for the final of the 2019–21 ICC World Test Championship. In May 2022, Duffy was again named in New Zealand's Test squad for their tour of England.

On 2 June 2022, Duffy signed a short-term deal to play as an overseas player for Kent County Cricket Club in two County Championship matches. He took eight wickets, with a five-wicket haul which included three wickets in an over, in his debut for the county.

In June 2022, Duffy was named in New Zealand's One Day International (ODI) squad for their tour of Ireland. He made his ODI debut on 12 July 2022, for New Zealand against Ireland.

In September 2024, Duffy signed a short-term contract with Nottinghamshire County Cricket Club to play in the club's final two matches of the County Championship season. In December of that year, Duffy signed for Worcestershire County Cricket Club for the first half of the 2025 season.
