= Garth Stirrat =

Cricket umpire

Personal information
- Full name: Garth Andrew Stirrat
- Born: 5 November 1968 (age 58); Wellington, New Zealand
- Role: Umpire

Umpiring information
- WODIs umpired: 3 (2016–2017)
- WT20Is umpired: 1 (2020)
- Source: CricketArchive (subscription required), 22 February 2023

Garth Stirrat (born 5 November 1968) is a New Zealand cricket umpire. He has stood in domestic matches in the 2016–17 Plunket Shield season and the 2016–17 Ford Trophy. He has also stood as an umpire in international matches featuring the New Zealand women's cricket team.
