= West Indian cricket team in New Zealand in 2025–26 =

International cricket tour

	New Zealand	West Indies
- Dates: 5 November – 22 December 2025
Captains	Tom Latham (Tests); Mitchell Santner (ODIs & T20Is)	Roston Chase (Tests); Shai Hope (ODIs & T20Is)

Test series
- Result: New Zealand won the 3-match series 2–0
Most runs	Devon Conway (452)	Justin Greaves (283)
Most wickets	Jacob Duffy (23)	Kemar Roach (10)
- Player of the series: Jacob Duffy (NZ)

One Day International series
- Results: New Zealand won the 3-match series 3–0
Most runs	Devon Conway (150)	Shai Hope (162)
Most wickets	Kyle Jamieson (7)	Jayden Seales (6)
- Player of the series: Kyle Jamieson (NZ)

Twenty20 International series
- Results: New Zealand won the 5-match series 3–1
Most runs	Tim Robinson (134)	Romario Shepherd (128)
Most wickets	Jacob Duffy (10)	Roston Chase (5)
- Player of the series: Jacob Duffy (NZ)

The West Indies cricket team toured New Zealand in November and December 2025 to play the New Zealand cricket team. The tour consisted of three Test, three One Day International (ODI) and five Twenty20 International (T20I) matches. The Test series formed part of the 2025–2027 ICC World Test Championship. In June 2025, the New Zealand Cricket (NZC) confirmed the fixtures for the tour, as a part of the 2025–26 home international season.

== Squads ==
New Zealand			West Indies		
Tests	ODIs	T20Is	Tests	ODIs	T20Is
Tom Latham (c, wk); Tom Blundell (wk); Michael Bracewell; Kris Clarke; Devon Conway; Jacob Duffy; Zak Foulkes; Mitchell Hay (wk); Matt Henry; Daryl Mitchell; Ajaz Patel; Glenn Phillips; Michael Rae; Rachin Ravindra; ~~Mitchell Santner~~; Nathan Smith; Blair Tickner; Kane Williamson; Will Young	Mitchell Santner (c); Michael Bracewell; Mark Chapman; Devon Conway; Jacob Duffy; Zak Foulkes; Matt Henry; Kyle Jamieson; Tom Latham (wk); Daryl Mitchell; Henry Nicholls; Rachin Ravindra; Nathan Smith; Blair Tickner; Will Young	Mitchell Santner (c); Michael Bracewell; Mark Chapman; Devon Conway; Jacob Duffy; Zak Foulkes; Mitchell Hay (wk); Kyle Jamieson; Daryl Mitchell; James Neesham; Rachin Ravindra; Tim Robinson; ~~Tim Seifert (wk)~~; Nathan Smith; Ish Sodhi	Roston Chase (c); Jomel Warrican (vc); Alick Athanaze; John Campbell; Tagenarine Chanderpaul; Justin Greaves; Kavem Hodge; Shai Hope (wk); Tevin Imlach (wk); Brandon King; Johann Layne; Anderson Phillip; Kemar Roach; Jayden Seales; Ojay Shields	Shai Hope (c, wk); Alick Athanaze; Ackeem Auguste; John Campbell; Keacy Carty; Roston Chase; Matthew Forde; Justin Greaves; Amir Jangoo (wk); Johann Layne; Khary Pierre; Sherfane Rutherford; Jayden Seales; Romario Shepherd; Shamar Springer	Shai Hope (c, wk); Alick Athanaze; Ackeem Auguste; Roston Chase; Matthew Forde; Jason Holder; Akeal Hosein; Amir Jangoo (wk); Brandon King; Khary Pierre; Rovman Powell; Sherfane Rutherford; Jayden Seales; Romario Shepherd; Shamar Springer

On 4 November, Tim Seifert was ruled out of the T20I series with a broken finger and was replaced by Mitchell Hay. On 17 November, Daryl Mitchell was ruled out of the second ODI due to a left groin strain, and Henry Nicholls was added to the squad as a cover. On 18 November, Mitchell was ruled out of the remainder of the ODI series. On 8 December Matt Henry (calf), Mitchell Santner (groin) and Nathan Smith (side) were ruled out of the remainder of the Test series and were replaced by Kris Clarke and Michael Rae. On the same day Glenn Phillips was added to the Test squad for the remainder of the series. On 9 December, Tom Blundell was ruled out of the second Test due to hamstring injury, and was replaced by Mitchell Hay. On 15 December, Blair Tickner was ruled out of the third Test due to dislocation of shoulder during second Test, and was replaced by Ajaz Patel.

== Tour match ==
26–27 November 2025
Scorecard

West Indies	v	New Zealand XI
346/5d (96 overs); Tagenarine Chanderpaul 85 (211); Toby Hart 1/28 (12 overs)		264 (73.4 overs); Cameron Paul 91 (135); Johann Layne 3/33 (9 overs)

Match drawn
Bert Sutcliffe Oval, Lincoln
Umpires: Cory Black (NZ) and Kim Cotton (NZ)

- West Indies won the toss and elected to bat.

== T20I series ==
=== 1st T20I ===
5 November 2025
19:15 (N)
Scorecard

West Indies; 164/6 (20 overs)	v	New Zealand; 157/9 (20 overs)
Shai Hope 53 (39); Jacob Duffy 2/19 (4 overs)		Mitchell Santner 55* (28); Roston Chase 3/26 (4 overs)

West Indies won by 7 runs
Eden Park, Auckland
Umpires: Shaun Haig (NZ) and Wayne Knights (NZ)
Player of the match: Roston Chase (WI)

- New Zealand won the toss and elected to field.
- James Neesham (NZ) scored his 1,000th run in T20Is.

=== 2nd T20I ===
6 November 2025
19:15 (N)
Scorecard

New Zealand; 207/5 (20 overs)	v	West Indies; 204/8 (20 overs)
Mark Chapman 78 (28); Roston Chase 2/33 (4 overs)		Rovman Powell 45 (16); Mitchell Santner 3/31 (4 overs)

New Zealand won by 3 runs
Eden Park, Auckland
Umpires: Cory Black (NZ) and Chris Brown (NZ)
Player of the match: Mark Chapman (NZ)

- West Indies won the toss and elected to field.

=== 3rd T20I ===
9 November 2025
13:15
Scorecard

New Zealand; 177/9 (20 overs)	v	West Indies; 168 (19.5 overs)
Devon Conway 56 (34); Matthew Forde 2/20 (4 overs)		Romario Shepherd 49 (34); Ish Sodhi 3/34 (4 overs)

New Zealand won by 9 runs
Saxton Oval, Nelson
Umpires: Chris Brown (NZ) and Shaun Haig (NZ)
Player of the match: Ish Sodhi (NZ)

- New Zealand won the toss and elected to bat.

=== 4th T20I ===
10 November 2025
13:15
Scorecard

West Indies; 38/1 (6.3 overs)	v	New Zealand
Alick Athanaze 21 (18); James Neesham 1/5 (1 over)

No result
Saxton Oval, Nelson
Umpires: Kim Cotton (NZ) and Wayne Knights (NZ)

- New Zealand won the toss and elected to field.
- No further play was possible due to rain.

=== 5th T20I ===
13 November 2025
13:15
Scorecard

West Indies; 140 (18.4 overs)	v	New Zealand; 141/2 (15.4 overs)
Roston Chase 38 (32); Jacob Duffy 4/35 (4 overs)		Devon Conway 47* (42); Shamar Springer 1/8 (2 overs)

New Zealand won by 8 wickets
University of Otago Oval, Dunedin
Umpires: Shaun Haig (NZ) and Wayne Knights (NZ)
Player of the match: Jacob Duffy (NZ)

- New Zealand won the toss and elected to field.
- Mark Chapman (NZ) played in his 100th T20I.
- Jacob Duffy (NZ) took his 50th wicket in T20Is.

== ODI series ==
=== 1st ODI ===
16 November 2025
14:00 (D/N)
Scorecard

New Zealand; 269/7 (50 overs)	v	West Indies; 262/6 (50 overs)
Daryl Mitchell 119 (118); Jayden Seales 3/41 (9 overs)		Sherfane Rutherford 55 (61); Kyle Jamieson 3/52 (10 overs)

New Zealand won by 7 runs
Hagley Oval, Christchurch
Umpires: Chris Brown (NZ) and Allahudien Paleker (SA)
Player of the match: Daryl Mitchell (NZ)

- West Indies won the toss and elected to field.
- Shamar Springer (WI) made his ODI debut.

=== 2nd ODI ===
19 November 2025
14:00 (D/N)
Scorecard

West Indies; 247/9 (34 overs)	v	New Zealand; 248/5 (33.3 overs)
Shai Hope 109* (69); Nathan Smith 4/42 (7 overs)		Devon Conway 90 (84); Justin Greaves 1/35 (4 overs)

New Zealand won by 5 wickets
McLean Park, Napier
Umpires: Kumar Dharmasena (SL) and Wayne Knights (NZ)
Player of the match: Shai Hope (WI)

- New Zealand won the toss and elected to field.
- The match was reduced to 34 overs per side due to rain.
- Shai Hope (WI) scored his 6,000th run in ODIs. He became the first player to hit centuries against all other full member nations in international cricket.

=== 3rd ODI ===
22 November 2025
14:00 (D/N)
Scorecard

West Indies; 161 (36.2 overs)	v	New Zealand; 162/6 (30.3 overs)
Roston Chase 38 (51); Matt Henry 4/43 (9.2 overs)		Mark Chapman 64 (63); Jayden Seales 2/35 (8 overs)

New Zealand won by 4 wickets
Seddon Park, Hamilton
Umpires: Chris Brown (NZ) and Allahudien Paleker (SA)
Player of the match: Matt Henry (NZ)

- West Indies won the toss and elected to bat.

== Test series ==
=== 1st Test ===
2–6 December 2025
Scorecard

New Zealand	v	West Indies
231 (70.3 overs); Kane Williamson 52 (102); Ojay Shields 2/34 (9 overs)		167 (75.4 overs); Shai Hope 56 (107); Jacob Duffy 5/34 (17.4 overs)
466/8d (109 overs); Rachin Ravindra 176 (185); Kemar Roach 5/78 (22 overs)		457/6 (163.3 overs); Justin Greaves 202* (388); Jacob Duffy 3/122 (43 overs)

Match drawn
Hagley Oval, Christchurch
Umpires: Paul Reiffel (Aus) and Alex Wharf (Eng)
Player of the match: Justin Greaves (WI)

- West Indies won the toss and elected to field.
- Only 70 overs of play was possible on day 1 due to rain.
- Ojay Shields (WI) made his Test debut.
- Jacob Duffy (NZ) took his maiden five-wicket haul in Tests.
- Tom Latham (NZ) scored his 6,000th run in Tests.
- Justin Greaves (WI) scored his maiden double century in Tests.
- World Test Championship points: New Zealand 4, West Indies 4.

=== 2nd Test ===
10–12 December 2025
Scorecard

West Indies	v	New Zealand
205 (75 overs); Shai Hope 48 (80); Blair Tickner 4/32 (16 overs)		278/9d (74.4 overs); Mitchell Hay 61 (93); Anderson Phillip 3/70 (13 overs)
128 (46.2 overs); Kavem Hodge 35 (75); Jacob Duffy 5/38 (17.2 overs)		57/1 (10 overs); Devon Conway 28* (22); Anderson Phillip 1/17 (2 overs)

New Zealand won by 9 wickets
Basin Reserve, Wellington
Umpires: Allahudien Paleker (SA) and Paul Reiffel (Aus)
Player of the match: Jacob Duffy (NZ)

- New Zealand won the toss and elected to field.
- Mitchell Hay and Michael Rae (NZ) both made their Test debuts.
- World Test Championship points: New Zealand 12, West Indies 0.

=== 3rd Test ===
18–22 December 2025
Scorecard

New Zealand	v	West Indies
575/8d (155 overs); Devon Conway 227 (367); Justin Greaves 2/83 (29 overs)		420 (128.2 overs); Kavem Hodge 123* (275); Jacob Duffy 4/86 (35 overs)
306/2d (54 overs); Tom Latham 101 (130); Kavem Hodge 2/80 (17 overs)		138 (80.3 overs); Brandon King 67 (96); Jacob Duffy 5/42 (22.3 overs)

New Zealand won by 323 runs
Bay Oval, Mount Maunganui
Umpires: Allahudien Paleker (SA) and Alex Wharf (Eng)
Player of the match: Devon Conway (NZ)

- New Zealand won the toss and elected to bat.
- Devon Conway and Tom Latham scored highest opening partnership in World Test Championship history.
- Devon Conway became the first-ever New Zealand batter to score double-century and a century in the same Test.
- World Test Championship points: New Zealand 12, West Indies 0.
