= Indian cricket team in New Zealand in 2026–27 =

International cricket tour

	New Zealand	India
- Dates: 22 October – 1 December 2026
Captains	Tom Latham (Tests); Mitchell Santner (ODIs & T20Is)	Shubman Gill (Tests & ODIs) (Note: Shreyas Iyer captained India in 4th and 5th ODIs); Shreyas Iyer (T20Is)

Test series

One Day International series
- Results: India won the 5-match series 3–1
Most runs	Will Young (162)	Virat Kohli (86)
Most wickets	Jacob Duffy (9)	Gurnoor Brar (9)
- Player of the series: Gurnoor Brar (Ind)

Twenty20 International series
- Results: India won the 5-match series 3–2
Most runs	Glenn Phillips (341)	Abhishek Sharma (197)
Most wickets	Mitchell Santner (9)	Arshdeep Singh (6)
- Player of the series: Glenn Phillips (NZ)

1st Test match between New Zealand and India at the Basin Reserve in Wellington

The India cricket team is touring New Zealand from October to December 2026 to play two Tests, five One Day Internationals (ODIs) and five Twenty20 International (T20I) matches. The Test series forms a part of the 2025–2027 World Test Championship cycle. In June 2026, New Zealand Cricket (NZC) confirmed the fixtures for the tour, as a part of the 2026 home international season. This is the biggest bilateral series played between both nations.

India won the five-match T20I series by 3–2, after winning the initial three T20Is, despite a late comeback by New Zealand. India also won the five-match ODI series by 3–1.

== Squads ==
New Zealand			India		
Tests	ODIs	T20Is	Tests	ODIs	T20Is
Tom Latham (c); Tom Blundell (wk); Devon Conway (wk); Jacob Duffy; Dean Foxcroft; Matt Henry; Kyle Jamieson; Daryl Mitchell; Henry Nicholls; Glenn Phillips; Rachin Ravindra; ~~Mitchell Santner~~; Nathan Smith; Blair Tickner; Will Young	Mitchell Santner (c); Finn Allen (Note: Only for 4th and 5th ODIs); Michael Bracewell; ~~Mark Chapman~~; ~~Devon Conway (wk) (Note: Only for 1st, 2nd and 3rd ODIs)~~; Kristian Clarke; Josh Clarkson (Note: Only for 5th ODI); Jacob Duffy; Lockie Ferguson; Matthew Fisher (Note: Matthew Fisher was originally in squad for 4th and 5th ODIs, however he was added to squad in 2nd ODI due to Blair Ticker's concussion injury.); Dean Foxcroft; Mitchell Hay (wk); Matt Henry (Note: Matt Henry was originally in squad for first three ODIs, however as he was ruled out from them he was subsequently cleared for 4th and 5th ODIs.); Kyle Jamieson (Note: Jamieson was initially in squad for first three ODIs, however he was later added to squad for 4th and 5th ODIs.); Nick Kelly; Tom Latham (wk); Daryl Mitchell; Henry Nicholls; Glenn Phillips; Brett Randell; ~~Rachin Ravindra~~; Tim Seifert (wk); Nathan Smith; Blair Tickner; Will Young	Mitchell Santner (c); Finn Allen; Michael Bracewell; ~~Mark Chapman~~; Josh Clarkson; Devon Conway (wk); Jacob Duffy; Lockie Ferguson; Matthew Fisher; ~~Zak Foulkes~~; Matt Henry; Bevon Jacobs; Kyle Jamieson; Adam Milne; Daryl Mitchell; Glenn Phillips; Tim Seifert (wk); Nathan Smith; Blair Tickner	Shubman Gill (c); KL Rahul (vc); Gurnoor Brar; Jasprit Bumrah; Akash Deep; Ravindra Jadeja; Yashasvi Jaiswal; Dhruv Jurel (wk); Anshul Kamboj; Prasidh Krishna; Devdutt Padikkal; Rishabh Pant (wk); Nitish Kumar Reddy; Mohammed Siraj; Sai Sudharsan; Washington Sundar; ~~Kuldeep Yadav~~	Shubman Gill (c); Shreyas Iyer (vc); Gurnoor Brar; Naman Dhir; Ruturaj Gaikwad; Anshul Kamboj; Ishan Kishan (wk) (Note: Kishan was India's vice-captain for the 4th and 5th ODIs); Virat Kohli; ~~Prasidh Krishna~~; Kumar Kushagra (wk); Auqib Nabi; Axar Patel; KL Rahul (wk); Nitish Kumar Reddy (Note: Only for 1st ODI.); Rohit Sharma; Arshdeep Singh; Mohammed Siraj; Yash Thakur; Tilak Varma; Kuldeep Yadav	Shreyas Iyer (c); Tilak Varma (vc); Varun Chakaravarthy; Naman Dhir; Shivam Dube; Ishan Kishan (wk); Bhuvneshwar Kumar; Axar Patel; Nitish Kumar Reddy; Sanju Samson (wk); Abhishek Sharma; Arshdeep Singh; Vaibhav Sooryavanshi; Kuldeep Yadav; Mayank Yadav; Prince Yadav

On 9 October, Mark Chapman and Zak Foulkes were ruled out of the T20I series due to hamstring and hip flexor injuries respectively. They were replaced by Josh Clarkson and Blair Tickner. On 28 October, Lockie Ferguson and Matt Henry were ruled out from the 4th and 5th T20Is due to calf injury and quad injury respectively. Later, Matthew Fisher was announced as the replacement. On 30 October, Prasidh Krishna was ruled out of the ODI series due to hamstring injury. On 31 October, Auqib Nabi who was originally in squad for only 4th and 5th ODIs was added for all five ODI matches. On 1 November, Mark Chapman and Rachin Ravindra were ruled out of the ODI series due to hamstring and shoulder injuries respectively. Later, Tim Seifert was made available for all five ODI matches while Dean Foxcroft and Henry Nicholls were added to the squad as replacements. On 6 November, Devon Conway was ruled out of the ODI series due to concussion injury. Later, Nick Kelly was included for all five ODI games. On 9 November, Lockie Ferguson was ruled out of remaining ODI matches, Matt Henry was cleared for 4th ODI and Blair Tickner was ruled out due to concussion. He was later replaced by Kristian Clarke. On 12 November, Brett Randell was added to the squad for 4th and 5th ODIs while Josh Clarkson was added in squad for 5th ODI. On 14 November, Gurnoor Brar was added to India's Test squad while Kuldeep Yadav was released from the squad. On 17 November, Mitchell Santner was ruled out of the Test series due to fractur in his right hand and was replaced by Dean Foxcroft in New Zealand's squad.

== T20I series ==
=== 1st T20I ===
22 October 2026
20:00 (N)
Scorecard

New Zealand; 225/4 (20 overs)	v	India; 230/6 (19.4 overs)
Glenn Phillips 82* (40); Mayank Yadav 1/40 (4 overs)		Sanju Samson 67 (33); Michael Bracewell 2/37 (4 overs)

India won by 4 wickets
Hagley Oval, Christchurch
Umpires: Chris Brown (NZ) and Shaun Haig (NZ)
Player of the match: Sanju Samson (Ind)

- India won the toss and elected to field.
- Arshdeep Singh (Ind) played his 100th T20I match.
- This was New Zealand's highest total at this venue in T20Is.
- This was India's highest successful run-chase in T20Is.

=== 2nd T20I ===
24 October 2026
20:00 (N)
Scorecard

New Zealand; 180/5 (20 overs)	v	India; 181/6 (19.5 overs)
Glenn Phillips 70 (43); Arshdeep Singh 2/33 (4 overs)		Tilak Varma 51* (26); Mitchell Santner 4/21 (4 overs)

India won by 4 wickets
Hagley Oval, Christchurch
Umpires: Kim Cotton (NZ) and Shaun Haig (NZ)
Player of the match: Tilak Varma (Ind)

- India won the toss and elected to field.
- This was India's 300th T20I.

=== 3rd T20I ===
27 October 2026
20:00 (N)
Scorecard

New Zealand; 198/3 (20 overs)	v	India; 199/4 (13.2 overs)
Daryl Mitchell 89* (52); Arshdeep Singh 1/33 (4 overs)		Abhishek Sharma 113 (38); Kyle Jamieson 2/45 (3.2 overs)

India won by 6 wickets
Wellington Regional Stadium, Wellington
Umpires: Cory Black (NZ) and Chris Brown (NZ)
Player of the match: Abhishek Sharma (Ind)

- India won the toss and elected to field.
- Glenn Phillips (NZ) played his 100th T20I match.
- Michael Bracewell and Jacob Duffy (NZ) both played in their 50th T20I match.
- Daryl Mitchell (NZ) scored his 2,000th run in T20Is.
- This was the second quickest chase of 190 runs or more in the history of T20Is.

=== 4th T20I ===
30 October 2026
20:00 (N)
Scorecard

New Zealand; 259/7 (20 overs)	v	India; 172/9 (20 overs)
Glenn Phillips 107 (49); Mayank Yadav 3/48 (4 overs)		Tilak Varma 35 (35); Jacob Duffy 4/23 (4 overs)

New Zealand won by 87 runs
Eden Park, Auckland
Umpires: Chris Brown (NZ) and Phillip Gillespie (Aus)
Player of the match: Glenn Phillips (NZ)

- India won the toss and elected to field.
- Arshdeep Singh (Ind) and Mitchell Santner (NZ) both took their 150th wicket in T20Is.
- This was New Zealand's highest total in T20Is.

=== 5th T20I ===
1 November 2026
20:00 (N)
Scorecard

India; 191/8 (20 overs)	v	New Zealand; 195/3 (18 overs)
Ishan Kishan 61 (32); Adam Milne 4/19 (4 overs)		Tim Seifert 93 (50); Nitish Kumar Reddy 1/19 (2 overs)

New Zealand won by 7 wickets
Seddon Park, Hamilton
Umpires: Phillip Gillespie (Aus) and Shaun Haig (NZ)
Player of the match: Adam Milne (NZ)

- New Zealand won the toss and elected to field.
- Varun Chakaravarthy (Ind) played in his 50th T20I match.
- Ishan Kishan (Ind) scored his 2,000th run in T20Is.
- Glenn Phillips (NZ) broke the record for most runs (341) in a five-match bilateral T20I series.

== ODI series ==
=== 1st ODI ===
4 November 2026
15:00 (D/N)
Scorecard

New Zealand; 185 (40.2 overs)	v	India; 143/5 (22.4 overs)
Tim Seifert 38 (43); Arshdeep Singh 4/70 (10 overs)		Virat Kohli 74 (51); Jacob Duffy 3/49 (7 overs)

India won by 5 wickets (DLS method)
Eden Park, Auckland
Umpires: Phillip Gillespie (Aus) and Paul Reiffel (Aus)
Player of the match: Anshul Kamboj (Ind)

- India won the toss and elected to field.
- India were set a revised target of 143 from 32 overs due to rain.

=== 2nd ODI ===
7 November 2026
15:00 (D/N)
Scorecard

New Zealand; 134 (41 overs)	v	India; 113/7 (26 overs)
Daryl Mitchell 55 (104); Gurnoor Brar 4/30 (10 overs)		Shreyas Iyer 30 (46); Kyle Jamieson 3/35 (10 overs)

India won by 4 runs (DLS method)
Wellington Regional Stadium, Wellington
Umpires: Chris Brown (NZ) and Kumar Dharmasena (SL)
Player of the match: Gurnoor Brar (Ind)

- India won the toss and elected to field.
- No further play was possible due to rain.
- India were 4 runs ahead of the DLS par score of 109 runs from 26 overs.
- Matthew Fisher (NZ) replaced Blair Tickner as a concussion substitute during the second innings of the match.

=== 3rd ODI ===
10 November 2026
15:00 (D/N)
Scorecard

New Zealand	v	India

No result
Seddon Park, Hamilton
Umpires: Chris Brown (NZ) and Paul Reiffel (Aus)

- India won the toss and elected to field.
- No play was possible due to rain.
- Paul Reiffel (Aus) stood as the on-field umpire in his 100th ODI.

=== 4th ODI ===
13 November 2026
15:00 (D/N)
Scorecard

New Zealand; 333 (50 overs)	v	India; 89 (26.4 overs)
Will Young 125 (108); Axar Patel 2/39 (10 overs)		Ishan Kishan 27 (53); Matt Henry 6/27 (9.4 overs)

New Zealand won by 244 runs
Bay Oval, Mount Maunganui
Umpires: Chris Brown (NZ) and Kumar Dharmasena (SL)
Player of the match: Matt Henry (NZ)

- India won the toss and elected to field.
- Shreyas Iyer captained India for the first time in ODIs.

=== 5th ODI ===
15 November 2026
15:00 (D/N)
Scorecard

India; 209 (42.1 overs)	v	New Zealand; 187 (48.1 overs)
Axar Patel 46 (55); Mitchell Santner 3/47 (10 overs)		Dean Foxcroft 31 (42); Arshdeep Singh 3/30 (10 overs)

India won by 22 runs
Bay Oval, Mount Maunganui
Umpires: Wayne Knights (NZ) and Paul Reiffel (Aus)
Player of the match: Arshdeep Singh (Ind)

- New Zealand won the toss and elected to field.
- Yash Thakur (Ind) made his ODI debut.
- Michael Bracewell (NZ) played his 50th ODI match.

== Test series ==
=== 1st Test ===
19–23 November 2026
Scorecard

New Zealand	v	India
368 (121 overs); Henry Nicholls 175* (335); Jasprit Bumrah 4/92 (29 overs)		720/9d (166 overs); KL Rahul 136 (290); Glenn Phillips 3/154 (24 overs)
119/2 (45 overs); Devon Conway 59* (137); Prasidh Krishna 1/20 (8 overs)

Stumps, Day 4
Basin Reserve, Wellington
Umpires: Kumar Dharmasena (SL) and Richard Illingworth (Eng)

- India won the toss and elected to field.
- Glenn Phillips (NZ) scored his 1,000th run in Tests. He also became the first player to score centuries in all three formats of international cricket against India in a calendar year.
- KL Rahul became the first Indian opener to hit Test centuries in all SENA nations.
- Rishabh Pant (Ind) became the first Asian wicket-keeper to score Test centuries in all SENA nations.
- India's 720 was the highest Test total ever scored in New Zealand and also their highest total in overseas Tests.

=== 2nd Test ===
27 November–1 December 2026
Scorecard

New Zealand	v	India

Hagley Oval, Christchurch

== India A cricket team in New Zealand in 2026–27 ==
India A cricket team in New Zealand in 2026–27
	New Zealand A	India A
- Dates: 24 October – 10 November 2026
Captains	Rhys Mariu	Dhruv Jurel

FC series
- Result: 3-match series drawn 0–0
Most runs	Dean Foxcroft (196)	Devdutt Padikkal (326)
Most wickets	Zak Gibson (8)	Auqib Nabi (6)

India A cricket team toured New Zealand to play against New Zealand A cricket team in October and November 2026. The tour consisted of three First-class matches.

=== Squad ===
New Zealand A	India A
Rhys Mariu (c); Adithya Ashok; Matt Boyle; Max Chu; Kristian Clarke; Matthew Fisher; Dean Foxcroft; Zak Gibson; Mitch Hay (wk); Curtis Heaphy; Simon Keene; Nick Kelly; Jayden Lennox; Ben Lister; Jarrod McKay; Henry Nicholls; Cameron Paul; Tim Robinson; Fraser Sheat	Dhruv Jurel (c, wk); Jasprit Bumrah; Mukesh Choudhary; Akash Deep; Ravindra Jadeja; Yashasvi Jaiswal; Anshul Kamboj; Prasidh Krishna; Mukesh Kumar; Kumar Kushagra (wk); Devdutt Padikkal; Shikhar Mohan; Auqib Nabi; ~~Rishabh Pant (wk)~~; KL Rahul; Yash Rathod; Nitish Kumar Reddy; Mohammed Siraj; Ravichandran Smaran; Sai Sudharsan; Manav Suthar; Washington Sundar; Tilak Varma

On 12 October 2026, Rishabh Pant was ruled out for the first two matches and was later replaced by Kumar Kushagra. On 23 October 2026, Shikhar Mohan was added to the India A squad for the last two matches in the place of KL Rahul. Mohammed Siraj was added into the squad for the second match while Prasidh Krishna and Nitish Kumar Reddy were added to the squad for the third match. On 5 November, Rishabh Pant was ruled out of the entire series and later Jasprit Bumrah and Ravindra Jadeja were added to the squad for the third match. Tilak Varma was also added to the squad for the third match.

=== First-class series ===
==== 1st unofficial Test ====
24–27 October 2026
Scorecard

India A	v	New Zealand A
113 (39.3 overs); Yash Rathod 44* (49); Simon Keene 5/24 (11.3 overs)		317 (89.3 overs); Rhys Mariu 76 (137); Anshul Kamboj 3/52 (20 overs)
516 (123.1 overs); Devdutt Padikkal 199 (248); Zak Gibson 3/80 (20.1 overs)		187/9 (65 overs); Curtis Heaphy 90* (187); Auqib Nabi 3/28 (10 overs)

Match drawn
Bert Sutcliffe Oval, Lincoln
Umpires: Kannan Jagannathan (NZ) and Brad Wilson (NZ)

- New Zealand A won the toss and elected to field.

==== 2nd unofficial Test ====
31 October – 3 November 2026
Scorecard

India A	v	New Zealand A
346 (102.4 overs); Dhruv Jurel 105 (171); Fraser Sheat 4/63 (24 overs)		424 (132.5 overs); Matt Boyle 110 (152); Mukesh Kumar 5/87 (29 overs)
282/2 (52.4 overs); Yashasvi Jaiswal 155* (162); Brett Randell 1/62 (14 overs)

Match drawn
Hagley Oval, Christchurch
Umpires: Cory Black (NZ) and Craig Pryor (NZ)

- New Zealand A won the toss and elected to field.

==== 3rd unofficial Test ====
7–10 November 2026
Scorecard

India A	v	New Zealand A
464/5d (146 overs); Yashasvi Jaiswal 102 (138); Zak Gibson 2/73 (23.1 overs)		36/2 (14 overs); Curtis Heaphy 19 (35); Prasidh Krishna 2/12 (5 overs)

Match drawn
Bert Sutcliffe Oval, Lincoln
Umpires: Kim Cotton (NZ) and Shaun Haig (NZ)

- New Zealand A won the toss and elected to field.
- No play was possible on Day 3 and Day 4 due to rain.
