= Sri Lankan cricket team in New Zealand in 2018–19 =

International cricket tour

	New Zealand	Sri Lanka
- Dates: 8 December 2018 – 11 January 2019
Captains	Kane Williamson (Tests & ODIs); Tim Southee (T20I)	Dinesh Chandimal (Tests); Lasith Malinga (ODIs & T20I)

Test series
- Result: New Zealand won the 2-match series 1–0
Most runs	Tom Latham (450)	Angelo Mathews (258)
Most wickets	Tim Southee (13)	Lahiru Kumara (9)

One Day International series
- Results: New Zealand won the 3-match series 3–0
Most runs	Ross Taylor (281)	Thisara Perera (224)
Most wickets	Ish Sodhi (8)	Lasith Malinga (7)

Twenty20 International series
- Results: New Zealand won the 1-match series 1–0
Most runs	Doug Bracewell (44)	Thisara Perera (43)
Most wickets	Lockie Ferguson (3); Ish Sodhi (3)	Kasun Rajitha (3)

The Sri Lanka cricket team toured New Zealand from December 2018 to January 2019 to play two Tests, three One Day Internationals (ODIs) and one Twenty20 International (T20I) match. They also played a three-day warm-up match ahead of the Test series.

Sri Lanka Cricket recalled batsmen Lahiru Thirimanne and Sadeera Samarawickrama after a year out of the Sri Lankan team. Bowler Nuwan Pradeep was also recalled to the team after previously being ruled out through injury.

New Zealand won the Test series 1–0, after the first match was drawn. It was their fourth consecutive series win, the first time they had achieved that in Test cricket. New Zealand won the ODI series 3–0. New Zealand scored the most runs by a team in a three-match bilateral ODI series. New Zealand's series aggregate of 1,054 runs are the most for any team in a three-match ODI series. They surpassed India's total of 1,053 runs in their home series against England in 2017. New Zealand also went on to win the one-off T20I match by 35 runs.

== Squads ==
Tests		ODIs		T20I	
New Zealand	Sri Lanka	New Zealand	Sri Lanka	New Zealand	Sri Lanka
Kane Williamson (c); Trent Boult; Colin de Grandhomme; Matt Henry; Tom Latham; Henry Nicholls; Ajaz Patel; Jeet Raval; Tim Southee; Ross Taylor; Neil Wagner; BJ Watling (wk); Will Young	Dinesh Chandimal (c); Dimuth Karunaratne (vc); Dushmantha Chameera; Niroshan Dickwella (wk); Danushka Gunathilaka; Lahiru Kumara; Suranga Lakmal; Angelo Mathews; Kusal Mendis; Dilruwan Perera; Nuwan Pradeep; Kasun Rajitha; Sadeera Samarawickrama; Lakshan Sandakan; Dhananjaya de Silva; Roshen Silva; Lahiru Thirimanne	Kane Williamson (c); Trent Boult; Doug Bracewell; Lockie Ferguson; Martin Guptill; Matt Henry; Colin Munro; James Neesham; Henry Nicholls; Tim Seifert (wk); Ish Sodhi; Tim Southee; Ross Taylor	Lasith Malinga (c); Dushmantha Chameera; Dinesh Chandimal; Niroshan Dickwella (wk); Asela Gunaratne; Danushka Gunathilaka; Lahiru Kumara; ~~Angelo Mathews~~; Kusal Mendis; Kusal Perera; Thisara Perera; Nuwan Pradeep; Seekkuge Prasanna; Kasun Rajitha; Sadeera Samarawickrama; Lakshan Sandakan; Dasun Shanaka; Dhananjaya de Silva	Tim Southee (c); Doug Bracewell; Lockie Ferguson; Martin Guptill; Scott Kuggeleijn; Colin Munro; ~~James Neesham~~; Henry Nicholls; Glenn Phillips; Seth Rance; Mitchell Santner; Tim Seifert (wk); Ish Sodhi; Ross Taylor	Lasith Malinga (c); Dushmantha Chameera; Dinesh Chandimal; Niroshan Dickwella (wk); Asela Gunaratne; Danushka Gunathilaka; Lahiru Kumara; ~~Angelo Mathews~~; Kusal Mendis; Kusal Perera; Thisara Perera; Nuwan Pradeep; Seekkuge Prasanna; Kasun Rajitha; Sadeera Samarawickrama; Lakshan Sandakan; Dasun Shanaka; Dhananjaya de Silva

Angelo Mathews suffered an injury during the second Test and was later ruled out of Sri Lanka's squads for the limited overs fixtures, with Sadeera Samarawickrama replacing him. James Neesham suffered an injury during the third ODI and was replaced by Doug Bracewell in New Zealand's squad for the one-off T20I match.

== Tour match ==
=== Three-day match: New Zealand XI vs Sri Lanka ===
8–10 December 2018
Scorecard

Sri Lanka	v	New Zealand XI
210/9d (59 overs); Angelo Mathews 128* (177); Blake Coburn 3/44 (13 overs)		270/8d (82 overs); Sandeep Patel 69 (106); Dilruwan Perera 2/30 (12 overs)
321/5d (80 overs); Danushka Gunathilaka 83 (77); Peter Younghusband 2/48 (20 overs)		139/2 (28.3 overs); William O'Donnell 52* (57); Kasun Rajitha 1/12 (5 overs)

Match drawn
McLean Park, Napier
Umpires: John Dempsey (NZ) and Eugene Sanders (NZ)

- Sri Lanka won the toss and elected to bat.

== Test series ==
=== 1st Test ===
15–19 December 2018
Scorecard

Sri Lanka	v	New Zealand
282 (90 overs); Angelo Mathews 83 (153); Tim Southee 6/68 (27 overs)		578 (157.3 overs); Tom Latham 264* (489); Lahiru Kumara 4/127 (31.3 overs)
287/3 (115 overs); Kusal Mendis 141* (335); Tim Southee 2/52 (25 overs)

Match drawn
Basin Reserve, Wellington
Umpires: Michael Gough (Eng) and Rod Tucker (Aus)
Player of the match: Tom Latham (NZ)

- New Zealand won the toss and elected to field.
- Only 13 overs were bowled on day 5 due to rain.
- Tom Latham (NZ) made the highest score while carrying the bat in Tests.
- It was also Latham's first double century in Tests and the first time a New Zealand batsman had carried the bat since Glenn Turner did so against the West Indies in 1972.

=== 2nd Test ===
26–30 December 2018
Scorecard

New Zealand	v	Sri Lanka
178 (50 overs); Tim Southee 68 (65); Suranga Lakmal 5/54 (19 overs)		104 (41 overs); Angelo Mathews 33* (88); Trent Boult 6/30 (15 overs)
585/4d (153 overs); Tom Latham 176 (370); Lahiru Kumara 2/134 (32 overs)		236 (106.2 overs); Kusal Mendis 67 (147); Neil Wagner 4/48 (29 overs)

New Zealand won by 423 runs
Hagley Oval, Christchurch
Umpires: Michael Gough (Eng) and Richard Illingworth (Eng)
Player of the match: Tim Southee (NZ)

- Sri Lanka won the toss and elected to field.
- This was New Zealand's largest winning margin, by runs, in Tests.

== ODI series ==
=== 1st ODI ===
3 January 2019
14:00 (D/N)
Scorecard

New Zealand; 371/7 (50 overs)	v	Sri Lanka; 326 (49 overs)
Martin Guptill 138 (139); Nuwan Pradeep 2/72 (8 overs)		Kusal Perera 102 (86); James Neesham 3/38 (8 overs)

New Zealand won by 45 runs
Bay Oval, Mount Maunganui
Umpires: Chris Brown (NZ) and Paul Wilson (Aus)
Player of the match: Martin Guptill (NZ)

- New Zealand won the toss and elected to bat.
- Tim Seifert (NZ) made his ODI debut.
- Martin Guptill became the fifth batsman for New Zealand to score 6,000 runs in ODIs.
- James Neesham scored the most runs in one over by a New Zealand batsman in ODIs (34).

=== 2nd ODI ===
5 January 2019
14:00 (D/N)
Scorecard

New Zealand; 319/7 (50 overs)	v	Sri Lanka; 298 (46.2 overs)
Ross Taylor 90 (105); Lasith Malinga 2/45 (10 overs)		Thisara Perera 140 (74); Ish Sodhi 3/55 (10 overs)

New Zealand won by 21 runs
Bay Oval, Mount Maunganui
Umpires: Shaun Haig (NZ) and Richard Illingworth (Eng)
Player of the match: Thisara Perera (SL)

- New Zealand won the toss and elected to bat.
- Colin Munro (NZ) scored his 1,000th run in ODIs.
- Thisara Perera (SL) scored his first century in ODIs and the fastest century against New Zealand in ODIs (57 balls).
- Thisara Perera scored thirteen sixes in his innings, the most by a Sri Lankan batsman in an ODI, and the most sixes by a batsman on the losing side in ODIs.

=== 3rd ODI ===
8 January 2019
11:00
Scorecard

New Zealand; 364/4 (50 overs)	v	Sri Lanka; 249 (41.4 overs)
Ross Taylor 137 (131); Lasith Malinga 3/93 (10 overs)		Thisara Perera 80 (63); Lockie Ferguson 4/40 (8 overs)

New Zealand won by 115 runs
Saxton Oval, Nelson
Umpires: Wayne Knights (NZ) and Paul Wilson (Aus)
Player of the match: Ross Taylor (NZ)

- Sri Lanka won the toss and elected to field.
- Ross Taylor (NZ) scored his 20th century in ODIs, and became the first New Zealand player to reach 20 centuries in any one format of the game.
- Henry Nicholls (NZ) scored his first century in ODIs.

== T20I match ==
=== Only T20I ===
11 January 2019
19:00 (N)
Scorecard

New Zealand; 179/7 (20 overs)	v	Sri Lanka; 144 (16.5 overs)
Doug Bracewell 44 (26); Kasun Rajitha 3/44 (4 overs)		Thisara Perera 43 (24); Lockie Ferguson 3/21 (3 overs)

New Zealand won by 35 runs
Eden Park, Auckland
Umpires: Shaun Haig (NZ) and Wayne Knights (NZ)
Player of the match: Doug Bracewell (NZ)

- Sri Lanka won the toss and elected to field.
- Scott Kuggeleijn (NZ) and Lahiru Kumara (SL) both made their T20I debuts.
