= World Test Championship records =

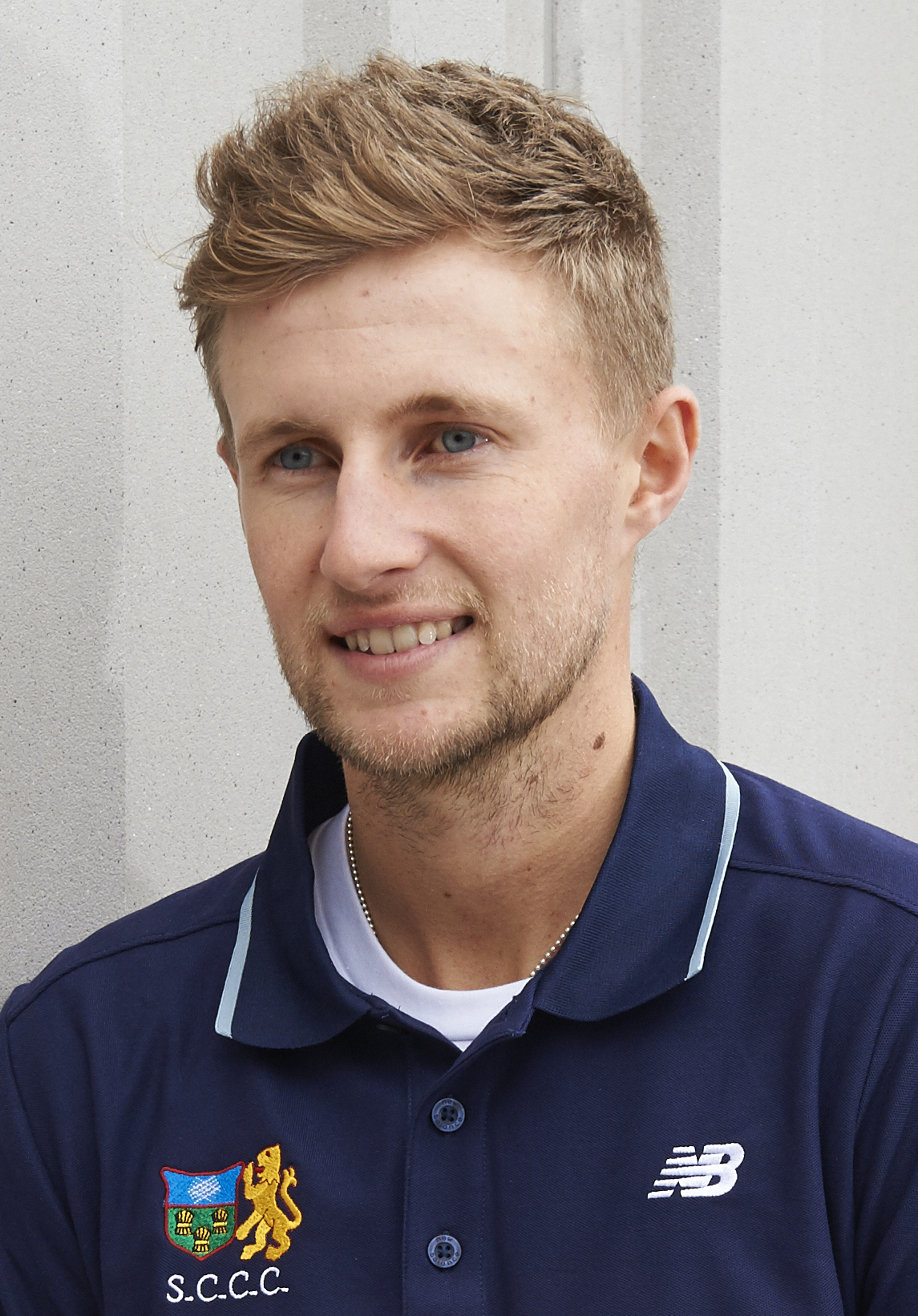
England's Joe Root has scored the most runs, most centuries and appeared in the most number of matches in this tournament.

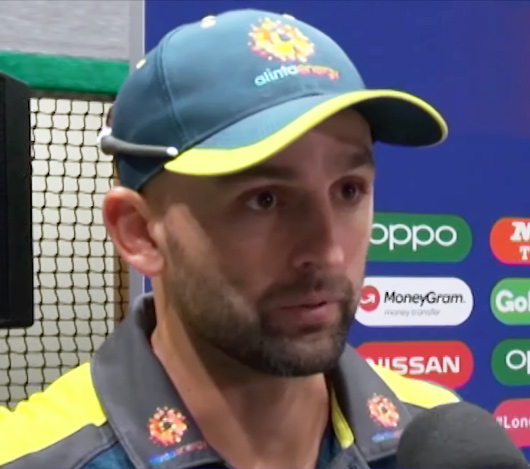
Australia's Nathan Lyon has taken most wickets, most ten-fer in a match.

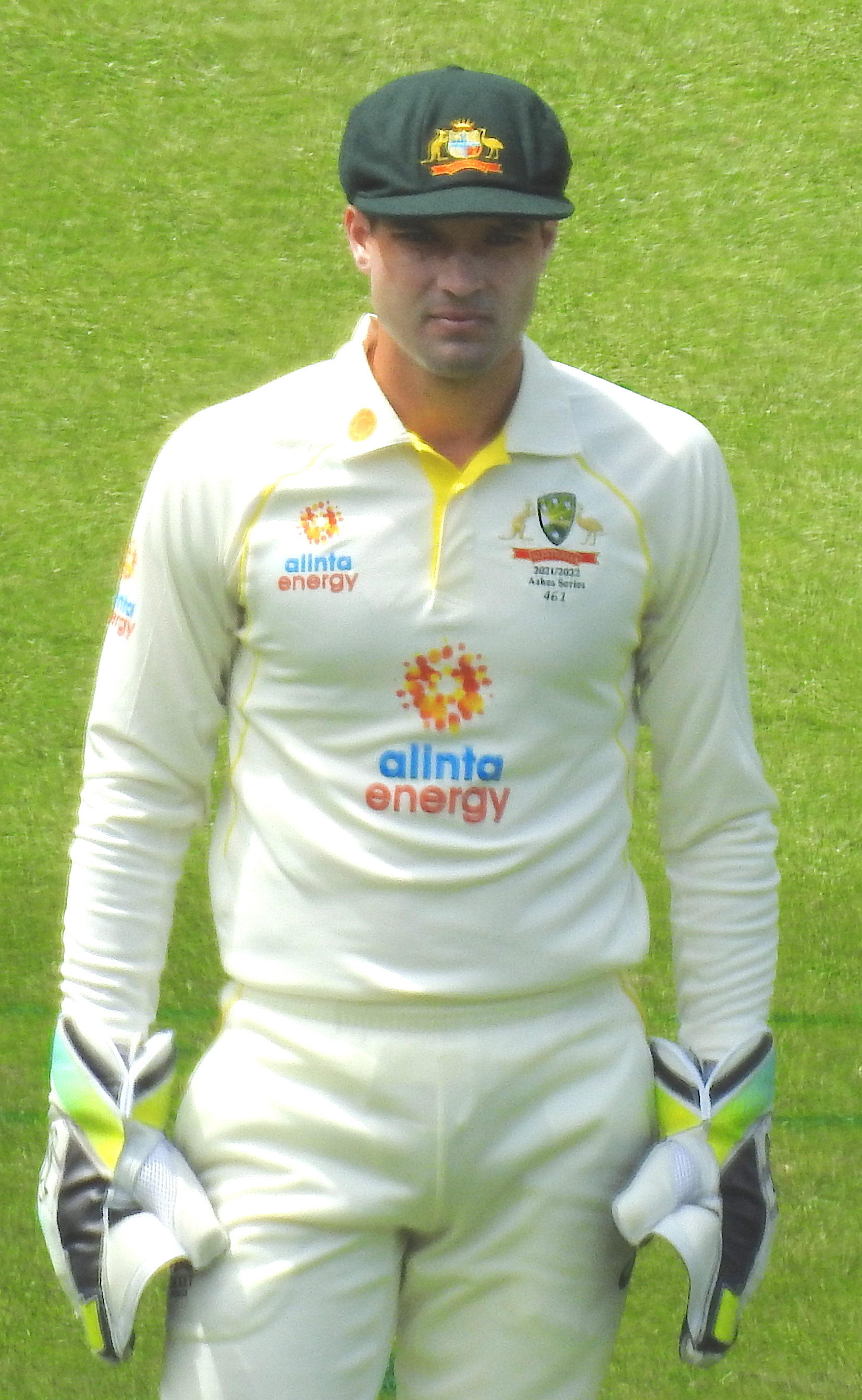
Australia's Alex Carey has effected the most number of dismissals in this tournament.

The ICC World Test Championship, also referred to as the Test World Cup, is a league competition for Test cricket run by the International Cricket Council (ICC), which started on 1 August 2019. It is the premier championship for Test cricket. It is in line with the ICC's goal of having one pinnacle tournament for each of the three formats of international cricket.

== Team records ==
=== Overview ===
Team	Span		Statistics								Best performance
Team	First Edition	Last Edition	Matches	Won	Lost	Draw	Tied	% Win	% Loss	% Draw	Best performance
Australia	2019–2021	2025–2027	67	42	16	9	0	62.69	23.88	13.43	Champions (2021–2023)
South Africa	2019–2021	2025–2027	49	28	19	2	0	57.14	38.78	4.08	Champions (2023–2025)
New Zealand	2019–2021	2025–2027	45	23	18	4	0	51.11	40.00	8.88	Champions (2019–2021)
India	2019–2021	2025–2027	67	36	23	8	0	53.73	34.32	11.94	Runners-up (2019–2021, 2021–2023)
England	2019–2021	2025–2027	81	39	33	9	0	48.14	40.74	11.11	4th place (2019–2021, 2021–2023)
Sri Lanka	2019–2021	2025–2027	45	13	23	9	0	28.89	51.11	20.00	5th place (2021–2023)
Pakistan	2019–2021	2025–2027	51	16	27	8	0	31.37	52.94	15.69	6th place (2019–2021)
Bangladesh	2019–2021	2025–2027	40	8	28	4	0	20.00	70.00	10.00	7th place (2023–2025)
West Indies	2019–2021	2025–2027	53	13	31	9	0	24.53	58.49	16.98	8th place (2019–2021, 2021–2023, 2023–2025)
Last updated: 20 November 2026

=== Team scoring records ===
==== Highest innings total ====
Score	Team	Opponent	Venue	Date
823/7d (150.0 overs)	England	Pakistan	Multan Cricket Stadium, Multan, Pakistan	7 October 2024
669 (157.1 overs)	England	India	Old Trafford, Manchester, England	23 July 2025
659/6d (158.5 overs)	New Zealand	Pakistan	Hagley Oval, Christchurch, New Zealand	3 January 2021
657 (101.0 overs)	England	Pakistan	Rawalpindi Cricket Stadium, Rawalpindi, Pakistan	1 December 2022
654/6d (154.0 overs)	Australia	Sri Lanka	Galle International Stadium, Galle, Sri Lanka	29 January 2025
Last updated: 26 July 2025

==== Lowest innings total ====
Score	Team	Opponent	Venue	Date
27 (14.3 overs)	West Indies	Australia	Sabina Park, Kingston, West Indies	12 July 2025
36 (21.2 overs)	India	Australia	Adelaide Oval, Adelaide, Australia	17 December 2020
42 (13.5 overs)	Sri Lanka	South Africa	Kingsmead Cricket Ground, Durban, South Africa	27 November 2024
46 (31.2 overs)	India	New Zealand	M. Chinnaswamy Stadium, Bengaluru, India	17 October 2024
53 (19.0 overs)	Bangladesh	South Africa	Kingsmead Cricket Ground, Durban, South Africa	31 March 2022
Last updated: 14 July 2025

==== Highest match aggregate ====
Score	Teams	Venue	Date
1768–37	England (657 & 264–7 d) v Pakistan (579 & 268)	Rawalpindi Cricket Stadium, Rawalpindi, Pakistan	1 December 2022
1692–36	India (587 & 427–6 d) v England (407 & 271)	Edgbaston Cricket Ground, Birmingham, England	2 July 2025
1675–35	New Zealand (553 & 284 d) v England (539 & 299–5)	Trent Bridge, Nottingham, England	10 June 2023
1673–35	India (471 & 364) v England (465 & 373–5)	Headingley, Leeds, England	20 June 2025
1599–26	Pakistan (556 & 220) v England (823–7 d)	Multan Cricket Stadium, Multan, Pakistan	6 October 2024
Last updated: 6 July 2025

==== Lowest match aggregate ====
Score	Teams	Venue	Date
369–30	Bangladesh (64 & 95) v Australia (210)	Great Barrier Reef Arena, Mackay, Australia	22 August 2026
387–30	England (112 & 81) v India (145 & 49–0)	Narendra Modi Stadium, Ahmedabad, India	24 February 2021
464–33	South Africa (55 & 176) v India (153 & 80–3)	Newlands Cricket Ground, Cape Town, South Africa	3 January 2024
504–34	South Africa (152 & 99) v Australia (218 & 35–4)	The Gabba, Brisbane, Australia	17 December 2022
516–40	Australia (225 & 121) v West Indies(143 & 27)	Sabina Park, Kingston, West Indies	12 July 2025
Last updated: 23 August 2026

=== Result records ===
==== Greatest win margin (by innings) ====
Margin	Team	Opponent	Venue	Date
Innings and 276 runs	New Zealand	South Africa	Hagley Oval, Christchurch, New Zealand	17 February 2022
Innings and 273 runs	South Africa	Bangladesh	Zohur Ahmed Chowdhury Stadium, Chittagong, Bangladesh	29 October 2024
Innings and 242 runs	Australia	Sri Lanka	Galle International Stadium, Galle, Sri Lanka	29 January 2025
Innings and 222 runs	India	Sri Lanka	Inderjit Singh Bindra Stadium, Mohali, India	4 March 2022
Innings and 222 runs	Pakistan	Sri Lanka	Singhalese Sports Club Cricket Ground, Colombo, Sri Lanka	24 July 2023
Last updated: 1 February 2025

==== Greatest win margin (by runs) ====
Margin	Team	Opponent	Venue	Date
434 runs	India	England	Niranjan Shah Stadium, Rajkot, India	15 February 2024
423 runs	New Zealand	England	Seddon Park, Hamilton, New Zealand	14 December 2024
419 runs	Australia	West Indies	Adelaide Oval, Adelaide, Australia	8 December 2022
408 runs	South Africa	India	Assam Cricket Association Stadium, Guwahati, India	22 November 2025
372 runs	India	New Zealand	Wankhede Stadium, Mumbai, India	3 December 2021
Last updated: 26 November 2025

==== Highest successful run chase ====
Score	Target	Team	Overs	RR	Opposition	Venue	Date
395/7	395	West Indies	127.3	3.10	Bangladesh	Zohur Ahmed Chowdhury Stadium, Chittagong, Bangladesh	7 February 2021
378/3	378	England	76.4	4.93	India	Edgbaston Cricket Ground, Birmingham, England	5 July 2022
373/5	371	England	82.0	4.54	India	Headingley Cricket Ground, Leeds, England	20 June 2025
362/9	359	England	125.4	2.88	Australia	Headingley Cricket Ground, Leeds, England	25 August 2019
344/6	342	Pakistan	127.2	2.70	Sri Lanka	Galle International Stadium, Galle, Sri Lanka	20 July 2022
Last updated: 24 June 2025

==== Narrowest win margin (by runs) ====
Margin	Team	Opponent	Venue	Date
6 runs	India	England	The Oval, London	31 July 2025
8 runs	West Indies	Australia	The Gabba, Brisbane, Australia	25 January 2024
17 runs	West Indies	Bangladesh	Sher-e-Bangla National Cricket Stadium, Mirpur, Bangladesh	11 February 2021
22 runs	England	India	Lord's, London, England	10 July 2025
25 runs	New Zealand	India	Wankhede Stadium, Mumbai, India	1 November 2024
Last updated: 4 August 2025

==== Narrowest win margin (by wickets) ====
Margin	Team	Opponent	Venue	Date
1 wicket	England	Australia	Headingley Cricket Ground, Headingley, England	22 August 2019
1 wicket	West Indies	Pakistan	Sabina Park, Kingston, Jamaica	12 August 2021
2 wickets	New Zealand	Sri Lanka	Hagley Oval, Christchurch, New Zealand	9 March 2023
2 wickets	Australia	England	Edgbaston Cricket Ground, Birmingham, England	16 June 2023
2 wickets	South Africa	Pakistan	Centurion Park, Centurion, South Africa	26 December 2024
Last updated: 29 December 2024

== Batting records ==
=== Most career runs ===
Runs	Batsman	Matches	Innings	NO	Average	HS	100s	50s
6,815	(England) Joe Root	80	147	13	50.85	262	23	25
4,804	(Australia) Steve Smith	63	110	12	49.02	211	14	21
4,651	(Australia) Marnus Labuschagne	63	115	9	43.87	215	11	24
4,200	(Australia) Travis Head	62	106	5	41.58	175	12	15
3,857	(England) Ben Stokes	64	117	7	35.06	176	8	19
Last updated: 31 October 2026

=== Most runs at each batting position ===
Batting position	Player	Runs	Average	Ref
Opener	(New Zealand) Tom Latham	2,944	36.34	
Number 3	(Australia) Marnus Labuschagne	4,313	45.40	
Number 4	(England) Joe Root	5,700	51.81	
Number 5	(England) Harry Brook	3,170	52.83	
Number 6	(England) Ben Stokes	1,796	30.96	
Number 7	(Australia) Alex Carey	1,533	31.28	
Number 8	(Bangladesh) Mehidy Hasan Miraz	792	28.28	
Number 9	(Australia) Mitchell Starc	778	22.22	
Number 10	(Australia) Nathan Lyon	622	14.13	
Number 11	(Cricket West Indies) Jayden Seales	203	9.22	
Last updated: 19 November 2026

=== Highest individual scores ===
Runs	Batsman	Balls	4s	6s	Opposition	Ground	Match date
335*	(Australia) David Warner	418	39	1	Pakistan	Adelaide Oval, Adelaide, Australia	29 November 2019
317	(England) Harry Brook	322	29	3	Pakistan	Multan Cricket Stadium, Multan, Pakistan	7 October 2024
269	(India) Shubman Gill	387	30	3	England	Edgbaston Cricket Ground, Birmingham, England	2 July 2025
267	(England) Zak Crawley	393	34	1	Pakistan	Rose Bowl, Southampton, England	21 August 2020
262	(England) Joe Root	375	17	0	Pakistan	Multan Cricket Stadium, Multan, Pakistan	7 October 2024
Last updated: 3 July 2025

=== Highest averages ===
Average	Batsman	Matches	Innings	Runs	NO	100s	50s
58.17	(New Zealand) Kane Williamson	32	58	3,025	6	11	7
51.01	(England) Harry Brook	37	64	3,214	1	9	17
50.85	(England) Joe Root	80	147	6,815	13	23	25
49.02	(Australia) Steve Smith	63	110	4,804	12	14	21
47.92	(India) Yashasvi Jaiswal	30	56	2,588	2	7	13
Qualification: Minimum 50 innings | Last updated: 22 October 2026

=== Most centuries ===
Centuries	Batsman	Matches	Innings
23	(England) Joe Root	80	147
14	(Australia) Steve Smith	63	110
12	(Australia) Travis Head	62	106
11	(New Zealand) Kane Williamson	32	58
11	(Australia) Marnus Labuschagne	63	115
Last updated: 31 October 2026

=== Most 50+ scores ===
50s	Batsman	Matches	Innings
48	(England) Joe Root	80	147
35	(Australia) Steve Smith	63	110
35	(Australia) Marnus Labuschagne	63	115
32	(Pakistan) Babar Azam	45	83
27	(Australia) Travis Head	62	106
27	(England) Ben Stokes	64	117
Last updated: 20 November 2026

=== Most sixes ===
6s	Batsman	Matches	Innings
88	(England) Ben Stokes	64	117
82	(India) Rishabh Pant	42	74
56	(India) Rohit Sharma	40	69
46	(India) Shubman Gill	42	76
45	(India) Yashasvi Jaiswal	30	56
Last updated: 12 September 2026

=== Most runs in a tournament ===
Runs	Batsman	Matches	Innings	NO	Average	HS	100s	50s	Edition
1,968	(England) Joe Root	22	40	4	54.66	262	7	7	2023–2025
1,915	(England) Joe Root	22	40	4	53.19	180*	8	6	2021–2023
1,798	(India) Yashasvi Jaiswal	19	36	2	52.88	214*	4	10	2023–2025
1,675	(Australia) Marnus Labuschagne	13	23	0	72.82	215	5	9	2019–2021
1,660	(England) Joe Root	20	37	2	47.43	228	3	8	2019–2021
Last updated: 4 January 2025

== Bowling records ==
=== Most career wickets ===
Wickets	Player	Matches	Innings	Runs	Overs	BBI	BBM	Average	5WI	10WM
249	(Australia) Mitchell Starc	59	114	5,997	1,727.5	7/58	10/51	24.08	9	2
234	(Australia) Pat Cummins	57	105	5,314	1,809.4	6/28	10/97	22.70	10	1
234	(Australia) Nathan Lyon	59	105	6,452	2,311.0	8/64	11/99	27.57	10	3
195	(India) Ravichandran Ashwin	41	78	4,191	1,479.0	7/71	12/131	21.49	11	1
185	(India) Jasprit Bumrah	42	79	3,558	1,269.1	6/27	9/91	19.23	13	0
Last updated: 31 October 2026

=== Best bowling figure in an innings ===
Figure	Bowler	Overs	Mdns	Econ	Opposition	Venue	Match date
10/119	(New Zealand) Ajaz Patel	47.5	12	2.48	India	Wankhede Stadium, Mumbai, India	3 December 2021
8/42	(Pakistan) Sajid Khan	15.0	4	2.80	Bangladesh	Sher-e-Bangla National Cricket Stadium, Mirpur, Bangladesh	4 December 2021
8/46	(Pakistan) Noman Ali	16.3	1	2.78	England	Multan Cricket Stadium, Multan, Pakistan	15 October 2024
8/64	(Australia) Nathan Lyon	23.3	1	2.72	India	Holkar Stadium, Indore, India	1 March 2023
7/13	(South Africa) Marco Jansen	6.5	1	1.90	Sri Lanka	Kingsmead Cricket Ground, Durban, South Africa	27 November 2024
Last updated: 29 November 2024

=== Best bowling figures in a match ===
Figure	Bowler	Overs	Mdns	Opposition	Venue	Match date
14/225	(New Zealand) Ajaz Patel	73.5	15	India	Wankhede Stadium, Mumbai, India	3 December 2021
13/157	(New Zealand) Mitchell Santner	48.3	3	India	Maharashtra Cricket Association Stadium, Pune, India	24 October 2024
12/106	(England) Gus Atkinson	26.0	7	West Indies	Lord's, London, England	10 July 2024
12/128	(Pakistan) Sajid Khan	47.4	12	Bangladesh	Sher-e-Bangla National Cricket Stadium, Mirpur, Bangladesh	4 December 2021
12/131	(India) Ravichandran Ashwin	46.0	13	West Indies	Windsor Park, Roseau, Dominica	12 July 2023
Last updated: 26 October 2024

=== Best averages ===
Average	Bowler	Matches	Wickets	Runs	Balls
17.47	(Cricket West Indies) Kyle Mayers	16	34	594	1,458
18.44	(Australia) Scott Boland	20	87	1,605	3,365
18.67	(England) Ollie Robinson	21	91	1,699	3,825
19.23	(India) Jasprit Bumrah	42	185	3,558	7,615
19.63	(New Zealand) Kyle Jamieson	20	87	1,708	3,702
Qualification: Minimum 1000 deliveries bowled Last updated: 22 October 2026

=== Best strike-rates ===
Strike Rate	Bowler	Matches	Wickets	Runs	Balls
37.15	(England) Josh Tongue	13	69	1,774	2,564
38.43	(Cricket West Indies) Shamar Joseph	17	69	1,721	2,652
38.67	(Australia) Scott Boland	20	87	1,605	3,365
38.75	(India) Kuldeep Yadav	12	53	1,228	2,054
39.92	(South Africa) Kagiso Rabada	39	182	4,025	7,266
Qualification: Minimum 1000 deliveries bowled Last updated: 19 November 2026

=== Most five-wicket-hauls in an innings ===
5WI	Player	Matches	Innings
13	(India) Jasprit Bumrah	42	79
11	(India) Ravichandran Ashwin	41	78
10	(Australia) Pat Cummins	57	105
10	(Australia) Nathan Lyon	59	105
9	4 players		
Last updated: 31 October 2026

=== Most ten-wicket haul in a match ===
10WM	Player	Matches	Innings
3	(Pakistan) Noman Ali	20	38
3	(Australia) Nathan Lyon	59	105
2	(Pakistan) Sajid Khan	14	27
2	(New Zealand) Ajaz Patel	16	29
2	(India) Ravindra Jadeja	50	93
2	(Australia) Mitchell Starc	59	114
Last updated: 31 October 2026

=== Most runs conceded in an innings ===
Runs	Bowler	Overs	Mdns	Opposition	Venue	Match date
235	(Pakistan) Zahid Mahmood	33.0	1	England	Rawalpindi Cricket Stadium, Rawalpindi, Pakistan	1 December 2022
234	(Sri Lanka) Sonal Dinusha	56.0	1	West Indies	Sir Vivian Richards Stadium, North Sound, Antigua and Barbuda	25 June 2026
205	(Pakistan) Yasir Shah	48.4	1	Australia	The Gabba, Brisbane, Australia	21 November 2019
205	(Pakistan) Abrar Ahmed	67.5	8	New Zealand	National Stadium, Karachi, Australia	26 December 2022
198	(Bangladesh) Taijul Islam	52.5	5	South Africa	Zohur Ahmed Chowdhury Stadium, Chittagong, Bangladesh	29 October 2024
Last updated: 10 July 2026

=== Most wickets in a tournament ===
Wickets	Player	Matches	Innings	Runs	Overs	BBI	BBM	Avg	5WI	10WM	Edition
88	(Australia) Nathan Lyon	20	34	2,299	889.2	8/64	11/99	26.12	5	1	2021–2023
80	(Australia) Pat Cummins	18	35	1,879	563.5	6/28	10/97	23.48	6	1	2023–2025
77	(India) Jasprit Bumrah	15	28	1,162	393.4	6/45	9/91	15.09	5	0	2023–2025
77	(Australia) Mitchell Starc	19	37	2,071	538.0	6/48	8/108	26.85	2	0	2023–2025
73	(Australia) Mitchell Starc	13	25	1,307	366.2	7/58	10/51	17.90	5	2	2025–2027
Last updated: 31 October 2026

== Wicket-keeping records ==
=== Most dismissals ===
Dismissals	Player	Matches	Innings	Catches	Stumping	Max dis	Dis/Inn
221	(Australia) Alex Carey	53	101	201	20	6	2.188
140	(India) Rishabh Pant	42	82	124	16	5	1.707
131	(Pakistan) Mohammad Rizwan	44	77	121	10	6	1.701
118	(Cricket West Indies) Joshua Da Silva	33	60	113	5	7	1.966
110	(New Zealand) Tom Blundell	40	65	97	13	4	1.692
Last updated: 31 October 2026

=== Most dismissals in an innings ===
Dismissals	Player	Catches	Stumping	Inning	Opposition	Venue	Match Date
8	(Bangladesh) Litton Das	6	2	2	South Africa	Wanderers Stadium, Johannesburg, South Africa	15 November 2026
7	(Cricket West Indies) Joshua Da Silva	7	0	3	South Africa	Centurion Park, Centurion, South Africa	28 February 2023
6	(South Africa) Quinton de Kock	6	0	2	England	Centurion Park, Centurion, South Africa	26 December 2019
6	(Australia) Alex Carey	6	0	4	West Indies	Adelaide Oval, Adelaide, Australia	8 December 2022
6	(Pakistan) Mohammad Rizwan	6	0	1	South Africa	Newlands Cricket Ground, Cape Town, South Africa	3 January 2025
6	(Pakistan) Ghazi Ghori	6	0	2	Sri Lanka	Rawalpindi Cricket Stadium, Rawalpindi, Pakistan	9 November 2026
Last updated: 18 November 2026

=== Most dismissals in a match ===
Dismissals	Player	Catches	Stumping	Opposition	Venue	Match Date
10	(Australia) Alex Carey	10	0	New Zealand	Hagley Oval, Christchurch, New Zealand	8 March 2024
9	(Australia) Alex Carey	9	0	West Indies	Adelaide Oval, Adelaide, Australia	8 December 2022
9	(Australia) Alex Carey	6	3	England	Edgbaston Cricket Ground, Birmingham, England	16 June 2023
9	(India) Rishabh Pant	9	0	Australia	The Gabba, Brisbane, Australia	14 December 2024
Last updated: 18 December 2024

=== Most dismissals in a tournament ===
Dismissals	Player	Matches	Innings	Catches	Stumping	Max dis	Dis/Inn	Edition
98	(Australia) Alex Carey	20	39	82	16	5	2.512	2023–2025
68	(Australia) Alex Carey	20	37	66	2	6	1.837	2021–2023
65	(Australia) Tim Paine	14	28	63	2	5	2.321	2019–2021
57	(Cricket West Indies) Joshua Da Silva	13	26	54	3	7	2.192	2021–2023
55	(Australia) Alex Carey	13	25	53	2	5	2.200	2025–2027
Last updated: 31 October 2026

== Fielding records ==
=== Most catches ===
Catches	Player	Matches	Innings	Max dis	Ct/Inn
128	(Australia) Steve Smith	63	121	5	1.057
112	(England) Joe Root	80	155	3	0.722
63	(South Africa) Aiden Markram	37	71	5	0.887
63	(England) Zak Crawley	57	109	4	0.577
59	(England) Harry Brook	37	74	4	0.797
Last updated: 19 November 2026

=== Most catches in an innings ===
Catches	Player	Inns	Opposition	Venue	Match Date
5	(England) Ben Stokes	2	South Africa	Newlands Cricket Ground, Cape Town, South Africa	3 January 2020
5	(Sri Lanka) Lahiru Thirimanne	2	England	Galle International Stadium, Galle, Sri Lanka	22 January 2021
5	(Australia) Steve Smith	2	England	Headingley Cricket Ground, Headingley, England	6 July 2023
5	(Sri Lanka) Dhananjaya de Silva	2	New Zealand	Galle International Stadium, Galle, Sri Lanka	26 September 2024
5	(South Africa) Aiden Markram	2	India	Assam Cricket Association Stadium, Guwahati, India	22 November 2025
Last updated: 24 November 2025

=== Most catches in a match ===
Catches	Player	Opposition	Venue	Match Date
9	(South Africa) Aiden Markram	India	Assam Cricket Association Stadium, Guwahati, India	22 November 2025
7	(New Zealand) Tom Latham	West Indies	Hagley Oval, Christchurch, New Zealand	2 December 2025
6	(Australia) David Warner	England	Headingley Cricket Ground, Leeds, South Africa	22 August 2019
6	(Australia) Steve Smith	England	The Oval, London, England	12 September 2019
6	(England) Ben Stokes	South Africa	Newlands Cricket Ground, Cape Town, South Africa	3 January 2020
6	(England) Ollie Pope	South Africa	St George's Park Cricket Ground, Gqeberha, South Africa	16 January 2020
6	(England) Moeen Ali	India	The Oval, London, England	2 September 2021
6	(Australia) Steve Smith	England	Adelaide Oval, Adelaide, Australia	16 December 2021
6	(New Zealand) Tom Latham	Bangladesh	Hagley Oval, Christchurch, New Zealand	9 January 2022
6	(England) Zak Crawley	India	Edgbaston Cricket Ground, Birmingham, England	1 July 2022
6	(South Africa) David Bedingham	Pakistan	Newlands Cricket Ground, Cape Town, South Africa	3 January 2025
Last updated: 6 December 2025

=== Most catches in a tournament ===
Catches	Player	Matches	Innings	Max dis	Ct/Inn	Edition
43	(Australia) Steve Smith	20	39	5	1.102	2023–2025
35	(England) Harry Brook	16	32	4	1.093	2025–2027
35	(England) Joe Root	22	43	3	0.813	2023–2025
34	(Australia) Steve Smith	20	37	3	0.918	2021–2023
34	(England) Joe Root	20	38	3	0.894	2019–2021
Last updated: 12 September 2026

== Partnership records ==
=== Highest partnership by wickets ===
Partnership	Wicket	Players	Team	Against	Match date
323	1st	Tom Latham and Devon Conway	New Zealand	West Indies	18 December 2025
361	2nd	David Warner and Marnus Labuschagne	Australia	Pakistan	29 November 2019
363	3rd	Kane Williamson and Henry Nicholls	New Zealand	Sri Lanka	17 March 2023
454	4th	Joe Root and Harry Brook	England	Pakistan	7 October 2024
359	5th	Zak Crawley and Jos Buttler	England	Pakistan	21 August 2020
401	6th	Amir Jangoo and Roston Chase	West Indies	Sri Lanka	25 June 2026
241	7th	Jamie Overton and Jonny Bairstow	England	New Zealand	23 June 2022
183	8th	Temba Bavuma and Simon Harmer	South Africa	Australia	18 October 2026
134	9th	Matt Renshaw and Nathan Lyon	Australia	South Africa	9 October 2026
116	10th	Cameron Green and Josh Hazlewood	Australia	New Zealand	29 February 2024
Last updated: 20 October 2026

=== Highest partnership by runs ===
Partnership	Wicket	Players	Team	Against	Match date
454	4th	Joe Root and Harry Brook	England	Pakistan	7 October 2024
401	6th	Amir Jangoo and Roston Chase	West Indies	Sri Lanka	25 June 2026
369	4th	Kane Williamson and Henry Nicholls	New Zealand	Pakistan	3 January 2021
363	3rd	Kane Williamson and Henry Nicholls	New Zealand	Sri Lanka	17 March 2023
361	2nd	David Warner and Marnus Labuschagne	Australia	Pakistan	29 November 2019
Last updated: 27 June 2026

== Individual records ==
=== Most appearances ===
Matches	Player	Period
80	(England) Joe Root	2019–2026
64	(England) Ben Stokes	2019–2026
63	(Australia) Steve Smith	2019–2026
63	(Australia) Marnus Labuschagne	2019–2026
62	(Australia) Travis Head	2019–2026
Last updated: 31 October 2026

=== Most matches as captain ===
Matches	Player	Period
43	(Australia) Pat Cummins	2021–2026
40	(England) Ben Stokes	2020–2026
36	(England) Joe Root	2019–2026
32	(Cricket West Indies) Kraigg Brathwaite	2021–2025
24	3 players	
Last updated: 31 October 2026

=== Most matches as an umpire ===
Matches	Player	Period
41	(New Zealand) Chris Gaffaney	2019–2026
38	(England) Richard Illingworth	2019–2026
37	(England) Richard Kettleborough	2019–2026
36	(India) Nitin Menon	2021–2026
34	(Australia) Rod Tucker	2019–2026
Last updated: 9 November 2026

=== Most matches as an umpire (finals) ===
Matches	Umpire	Period
3	(England) Richard Illingworth	2021–2025
2	(New Zealand) Chris Gaffaney	2023–2025
1	(England) Michael Gough	2021
Last updated: 11 June 2025

== See also ==
- List of Test cricket records
