= Tejaswi Jaiswal =

Indian cricketer (born 1997)

Personal information
- Full name: Tejasvi Bhupendra Kumar Jaiswal
- Born: 2 March 1997 (age 29); Suriyawan, Uttar Pradesh, India
- Batting: Left-handed
- Bowling: Right-arm medium
- Role: Allrounder
- Relatives: Yashasvi Jaiswal (brother)

Domestic team information
- Years: Team
- 2022–present: Tripura

Career statistics
Competition	FC	LA	T20
Matches	5	1	2
Runs scored	164	23	3
Batting average	23.42	23.00	1.50
100s/50s	0/1	0/0	0/0
Top score	82	23	2
Balls bowled	174	–	–
Wickets	1	–	–
Bowling average	77.00	–	–
5 wickets in innings	0	–	–
10 wickets in match	0	–	–
Best bowling	1/34	–	–
Catches/stumpings	2/–	0/–	0/–
- Source: Cricinfo, 20 March 2025

Tejaswi Bhupendra Kumar Jaiswal (born 2 March 1997) is an Indian cricketer who plays for Tripura. He made his Twenty20 debut on 23 November 2024, for Tripura in the 2024–25 Syed Mushtaq Ali Trophy. He made his first-class debut on 18 October 2024, for Tripura in the 2024–25 Ranji Trophy. He made his List A debut on 3 January 2025, for Tripura in the 2024–25 Vijay Hazare Trophy.
