= Kumar Kushagra =

Indian cricketer (born 2004)

Personal information
- Born: 23 October 2004 (age 22); Bokaro, Jharkhand, India
- Batting: Right-handed
- Role: Wicket-keeper batsman

International information
- National side: India (2026–present)

Domestic team information
- Years: Team
- 2021–present: Jharkhand
- 2024: Delhi Capitals
- 2025–present: Gujarat Titans

Career statistics
Competition	FC	LA	T20
Matches	30	35	32
Runs scored	1,912	1,240	676
Batting average	41.56	56.36	28.16
100s/50s	4/5	2/9	0/5
Top score	266	143*	86*
Catches/stumpings	49/14	34/3	24/3
- Source: ESPNcricinfo, 3 January 2026

Kumar Kushagra (born 23 October 2004) is an Indian cricketer who plays for Jharkhand in domestic cricket and Gujarat Titans in the Indian Premier League.

He made his List A debut on 20 February 2021, for Jharkhand in the 2020–21 Vijay Hazare Trophy. Prior to his debut, he was named in India's squad for the 2020 Under-19 Cricket World Cup. He made his Twenty20 debut on 4 November 2021, for Jharkhand in the 2021–22 Syed Mushtaq Ali Trophy.

He made his first-class debut on 24 February 2022, for Jharkhand in the 2021–22 Ranji Trophy. In March 2022, in the preliminary quarter-final match of Ranji Trophy, Kushagra scored his maiden century in first-class cricket, before going on to convert it into his maiden double century in first-class cricket. His innings of 67 off 37 balls for Jharkhand in the Vijay Hazare Trophy impressed many. In the IPL 2024 auctions held in Dubai, he was picked by the Delhi Capitals for 7.2 crore.

== International career ==
In October 2026, Kushagra earned his maiden call-up to the Indian One Day International (ODI) squad for the final two matches of the New Zealand series, drafted in as a wicketkeeping option alongside Ishan Kishan during KL Rahul's absence.
