= South African cricket team in New Zealand in 2016–17 =

International cricket tour

	New Zealand	South Africa
- Dates: 14 February – 29 March 2017
Captains	Kane Williamson	Faf du Plessis ( Tests & T20I); AB de Villiers (ODIs)

Test series
- Result: South Africa won the 3-match series 1–0
Most runs	Kane Williamson (309)	Dean Elgar (265)
Most wickets	Neil Wagner (12)	Keshav Maharaj (15)

One Day International series
- Results: South Africa won the 5-match series 3–2
Most runs	Ross Taylor (195)	AB de Villiers (262)
Most wickets	Trent Boult (6)	Kagiso Rabada (8)

Twenty20 International series
- Results: South Africa won the 1-match series 1–0
Most runs	Tom Bruce (33)	Hashim Amla (62)
Most wickets	Trent Boult (2); Colin de Grandhomme (2)	Imran Tahir (5)

The South African cricket team toured New Zealand during February to March 2017 to play three Test matches, five One Day Internationals (ODIs) and one Twenty20 International (T20I) match. In January 2017 the current South African Test captain AB de Villiers said he would be unavailable for selection for this series. The fourth ODI, which was originally scheduled to be played at McLean Park, Napier, was moved to Seddon Park, Hamilton. This was due to need for urgent work on the venue's turf, drainage and irrigation system.

South Africa won the one-off T20I match by 78 runs, and the five-match ODI series 3–2, reclaiming the number one spot in the ODI ranking. It was South Africa's seventh consecutive win in a bilateral ODI series, ending New Zealand's eighth successive bilateral ODI series winning streak at home. South Africa won the Test series 1–0, with the first and third Tests ending as draws, leading to the confirmation of South Africa as the number two Test ranked nation by the cut-off date of 1 April 2017 behind India.

== Squads ==
Tests		ODIs		T20I	
New Zealand	South Africa	New Zealand	South Africa	New Zealand	South Africa
Kane Williamson (c); ~~Trent Boult~~; Neil Broom; Colin de Grandhomme; Matt Henry; Tom Latham; James Neesham; Henry Nicholls; Jeetan Patel; Jeet Raval; Mitchell Santner; ~~Tim Southee~~; ~~Ross Taylor~~; Neil Wagner; BJ Watling (wk)	Faf du Plessis (c); Hashim Amla; Temba Bavuma; Stephen Cook; Quinton de Kock (wk); Theunis de Bruyn; JP Duminy; Dean Elgar; Heinrich Klaasen; Keshav Maharaj; Morné Morkel; ~~Chris Morris~~; ~~Duanne Olivier~~; Wayne Parnell; Vernon Philander; Dane Piedt; Kagiso Rabada	Kane Williamson (c); Trent Boult; Neil Broom; Dean Brownlie; Lockie Ferguson; Colin de Grandhomme; Martin Guptill; Matt Henry; Tom Latham (wk); James Neesham; Jeetan Patel; Luke Ronchi (wk); Mitchell Santner; Ish Sodhi; Tim Southee; Ross Taylor	AB de Villiers (c); Faf du Plessis; Hashim Amla; Farhaan Behardien; Quinton de Kock (wk); JP Duminy; Imran Tahir; David Miller; Chris Morris; Wayne Parnell; Dane Paterson; Andile Phehlukwayo; Dwaine Pretorius; Kagiso Rabada; Tabraiz Shamsi	Kane Williamson (c); Corey Anderson; Trent Boult; Tom Bruce; Lockie Ferguson; Colin de Grandhomme; ~~Martin Guptill~~; Colin Munro; James Neesham; Glenn Phillips; Luke Ronchi (wk); Mitchell Santner; Ish Sodhi; Tim Southee; Ben Wheeler	Faf du Plessis (c); Hashim Amla; Farhaan Behardien; Quinton de Kock (wk); AB de Villiers; JP Duminy; Imran Tahir; David Miller; Chris Morris; Wayne Parnell; Dane Paterson; Andile Phehlukwayo; Dwaine Pretorius; Kagiso Rabada; Tabraiz Shamsi

Martin Guptill was ruled out of New Zealand's limited-overs squads due to injury. Glenn Phillips replaced him for the T20I match and Dean Brownlie replaced him for the ODI matches. However, ahead of the fourth ODI, Guptill and Jeetan Patel were added to the ODI squad and Matt Henry was released. However, ahead of the fifth ODI, Matt Henry was added back to the ODI squad. Ross Taylor was ruled out of the New Zealand squad for the 2nd Test due to calf injury sustained during the 1st Test. Neil Broom was named as his replacement. Matt Henry was also included in the Test squad. Dane Piedt was added to South Africa's squad ahead of the second Test. With Piedt added to South Africa's squad, Chris Morris was released from the team. Trent Boult was ruled out of New Zealand's squad for the 2nd Test due to leg injury sustained during the 1st Test. Duanne Olivier was released from South Africa's squad ahead of the third Test. Tim Southee was ruled out of the final Test with a hamstring injury.

== Tour match ==
14 February 2017
15.00 (D/N)
Scorecard

New Zealand XI	v	South Africa

Match abandoned
Eden Park Outer Oval, Auckland
Umpires: Chris Brown (NZ) and Wayne Knights (NZ)

- No toss.
- No play was possible due to rain.

== T20I series ==
=== Only T20I ===
17 February 2017
19.00 (D/N)
Scorecard

South Africa; 185/6 (20 overs)	v	New Zealand; 107 (14.5 overs)
Hashim Amla 62 (43); Trent Boult 2/8 (4 overs)		Tom Bruce 33 (27); Imran Tahir 5/24 (3.5 overs)

South Africa won by 78 runs
Eden Park, Auckland
Umpires: Chris Brown (NZ) and Wayne Knights (NZ)
Player of the match: Imran Tahir (SA)

- New Zealand won the toss and elected to field.
- Glenn Phillips (NZ) made his T20I debut.
- Imran Tahir (SA) took his maiden five-wicket haul in T20Is and became the second-quickest bowler, in terms of matches, to take 50 wickets in T20Is (31).

== ODI series ==
=== 1st ODI ===
19 February 2017
14.00 (D/N)
Scorecard

New Zealand; 207/7 (34 overs)	v	South Africa; 210/6 (33.5 overs)
Kane Williamson 59 (53); Chris Morris 4/62 (7 overs)		Quinton de Kock 69 (64); Tim Southee 2/47 (6.5 overs)

South Africa won by 4 wickets
Seddon Park, Hamilton
Umpires: Wayne Knights (NZ) and Joel Wilson (WI)
Player of the match: Quinton de Kock (SA)

- South Africa won the toss and elected to field.
- Rain reduced the match to 34 overs per side.
- South Africa equalled their record of most consecutive wins in ODIs (12).

=== 2nd ODI ===
22 February 2017
11.00
Scorecard

New Zealand; 289/4 (50 overs)	v	South Africa; 283/9 (50 overs)
Ross Taylor 102* (110); Dwaine Pretorius 2/40 (10 overs)		Quinton de Kock 57 (65); Trent Boult 3/63 (10 overs)

New Zealand won by 6 runs
Hagley Oval, Christchurch
Umpires: Chris Brown (NZ) and Paul Reiffel (Aus)
Player of the match: Ross Taylor (NZ)

- South Africa won the toss and elected to field.
- Ross Taylor became New Zealand's quickest batsman to reach 6,000 runs in ODIs, and his 17th ODI century broke the record for most ODI hundreds by a New Zealand batsman.
- Ross Taylor became the sixth batsman to score ODI centuries against all Full Member teams.
- South Africa's longest winning streak in ODIs ended after 12 consecutive wins.

=== 3rd ODI ===
25 February 2017
14.00 (D/N)
Scorecard

South Africa; 271/8 (50 overs)	v	New Zealand; 112 (32.2 overs)
AB de Villiers 85 (80); Colin de Grandhomme 2/40 (10 overs)		Colin de Grandhomme 34* (34); Dwaine Pretorius 3/5 (5.2 overs)

South Africa won by 159 runs
Westpac Stadium, Wellington
Umpires: Chris Brown (NZ) and Joel Wilson (WI)
Player of the match: AB de Villiers (SA)

- South Africa won the toss and elected to bat.
- AB de Villiers (SA) became the quickest batsman to score 9000 runs in ODIs.

=== 4th ODI ===
1 March 2017
14.00 (D/N)
Scorecard

South Africa; 279/8 (50 overs)	v	New Zealand; 280/3 (45 overs)
AB de Villiers 72* (59); Jeetan Patel 2/57 (10 overs)		Martin Guptill 180* (138); Imran Tahir 2/54 (10 overs)

New Zealand won by 7 wickets
Seddon Park, Hamilton
Umpires: Wayne Knights (NZ) and Paul Reiffel (Aus)
Player of the match: Martin Guptill (NZ)

- South Africa won the toss and elected to bat.
- For the first time in an ODI, two spinners opened the bowling in the first innings.
- Martin Guptill made the highest score for New Zealand against South Africa in ODIs.
- Guptill made the highest score in the second innings by a New Zealand batsman in ODIs and hit the most sixes in an ODI innings at this venue (11).
- Guptill's third-wicket stand of 180 with Ross Taylor is the joint second-highest for New Zealand in ODIs and highest for any wicket against South Africa in ODIs.

=== 5th ODI ===
4 March 2017
14.00 (D/N)
Scorecard

New Zealand; 149 (41.1 overs)	v	South Africa; 150/4 (32.2 overs)
Colin de Grandhomme 32 (48); Kagiso Rabada 3/25 (7.1 overs)		Faf du Plessis 51* (90); Jeetan Patel 2/26 (5 overs)

South Africa won by 6 wickets
Eden Park, Auckland
Umpires: Chris Brown (NZ) and Joel Wilson (WI)
Player of the match: Kagiso Rabada (SA)

- South Africa won the toss and elected to field.
- Hashim Amla (SA) played his 150th ODI.
- This was New Zealand's lowest score in an ODI when batting first against South Africa.
- Imran Tahir (SA) recorded the most economical figures by a South African spinner in an ODI, with 2 wickets for 14 runs from 10 overs.

== Test series ==
=== 1st Test ===
8–12 March 2017
Scorecard

South Africa	v	New Zealand
308 (122.4 overs); Dean Elgar 140 (299); Trent Boult 4/64 (32.4 overs)		341 (114.3 overs); Kane Williamson 130 (241); Keshav Maharaj 5/94 (28.3 overs)
224/6 (102 overs); Dean Elgar 89 (249); Neil Wagner 2/57 (27 overs)

Match drawn
University of Otago Oval, Dunedin
Umpires: Kumar Dharmasena (SL) and Bruce Oxenford (Aus)
Player of the match: Dean Elgar (SA)

- South Africa won the toss and elected to bat.
- No play was possible on day 5 due to rain.
- Jeet Raval and Kane Williamson's 102-run partnership is the highest 2nd-wicket partnership for New Zealand against South Africa in Tests.
- Keshav Maharaj (SA) took his maiden five-wicket haul in Tests.

=== 2nd Test ===
16–20 March 2017
Scorecard

New Zealand	v	South Africa
268 (79.3 overs); Henry Nicholls 118 (161); JP Duminy 4/47 (11.3 overs)		359 (98 overs); Quinton de Kock 91 (118); Colin de Grandhomme 3/52 (23 overs)
171 (63.2 overs); Jeet Raval 80 (174); Keshav Maharaj 6/40 (20.2 overs)		83/2 (24.3 overs); Hashim Amla 38* (61); Tim Southee 1/17 (6 overs)

South Africa won by 8 wickets
Basin Reserve, Wellington
Umpires: Kumar Dharmasena (SL) and Rod Tucker (Aus)
Player of the match: Keshav Maharaj (SA)

- South Africa won the toss and elected to field.
- Neil Broom (NZ) made his Test debut.
- Henry Nicholls (NZ) scored his first century in Tests.
- Morne Morkel and Vernon Philander's partnership of 57 was the best for the 10th wicket for South Africa against New Zealand.

=== 3rd Test ===
25–29 March 2017
Scorecard

South Africa	v	New Zealand
314 (89.2 overs); Quinton de Kock 90 (118); Matt Henry 4/93 (24 overs)		489 (162.1 overs); Kane Williamson 176 (285); Morné Morkel 4/100 (36.1 overs)
80/5 (39 overs); Hashim Amla 19 (40); Jeetan Patel 2/22 (12 overs)

Match drawn
Seddon Park, Hamilton
Umpires: Bruce Oxenford (Aus) and Rod Tucker (Aus)
Player of the match: Kane Williamson (NZ)

- South Africa won the toss and elected to bat.
- Only 41 overs of play were possible on day 1 due to rain, and no play was possible on day 5 also due to rain.
- Theunis de Bruyn (SA) made his Test debut.
- Kane Williamson (NZ) made his 17th Test century, the joint-most by a New Zealand batsman.
- Kane Williamson also took the fewest innings for a New Zealand batsman to reach 5,000 runs in Tests (110).
- Morné Morkel (SA) took his 250th wicket in Tests.
