= Yashasvi Jaiswal =

Indian cricketer (born 2001)

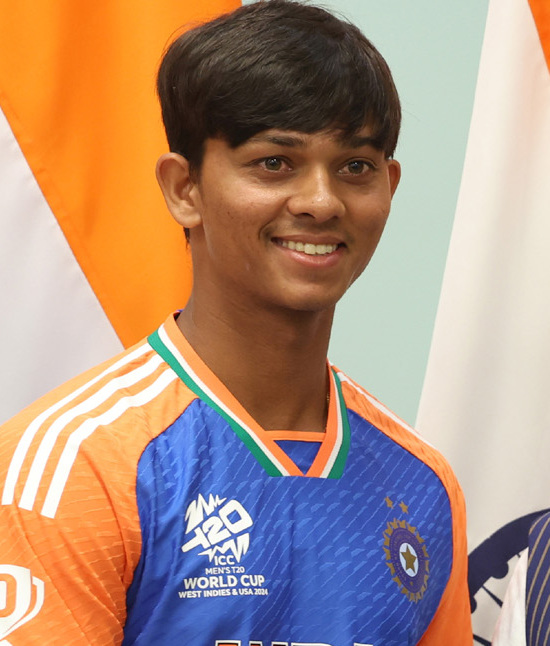

Personal information
- Full name: Yashasvi Bhupendra Kumar Jaiswal
- Born: 28 December 2001 (age 24); Suriyawan, Uttar Pradesh, India
- Height: 183 cm (6 ft 0 in)
- Batting: Left-handed
- Bowling: Right-arm leg break
- Role: Opening batter
- Relatives: Tejaswi Jaiswal (brother)

International information
- National side: India (2023–present)
- Test debut (cap 306): 12 July 2023 v West Indies
- Last Test: 6 June 2026 v Afghanistan
- ODI debut (cap 257): 6 February 2025 v England
- Last ODI: 17 June 2026 v Afghanistan
- ODI shirt no.: 64
- T20I debut (cap 105): 8 August 2023 v West Indies
- Last T20I: 30 July 2024 v Sri Lanka
- T20I shirt no.: 64

Domestic team information
- Years: Team
- 2018–present: Mumbai
- 2020–present: Rajasthan Royals

Career statistics
Competition	Test	ODI	T20I	FC
Matches	28	6	23	50
Runs scored	2,511	285	723	4,867
Batting average	49.23	71.25	36.15	55.30
100s/50s	7/13	2/0	1/5	17/18
Top score	214*	116*	100	265
Catches/stumpings	25/–	2/–	15/–	43/–
Medal record
Men's cricket
Representing India
ICC T20 World Cup
Winner	2024 West Indies & USA
Asian Games
Gold medal – first place	2022 Hangzhou
ICC U19 World Cup
Runner-up	2020 South Africa
ACC U19 Asia Cup
Winner	2018 Bangladesh
- Source: ESPNcricinfo, 30 March 2026

Yashasvi Bhupendra Kumar Jaiswal (Hindi: [jʌʃʌˈsʋiː ˈdʒɛːswaːl]; often stylized as Y.B. Jaiswal) is an Indian international cricketer who plays for the Indian national cricket team in all formats of this game. He made his international debut in the first Test against the West Indies in July 2023, scoring a century in his first innings in Test cricket. He plays for Mumbai in domestic cricket and Rajasthan Royals in the Indian Premier League. He was featured in Time 100 Next list of Time Magazine in 2025.

A left-handed opening batter, Jaiswal gained particular attention when he scored double centuries in two consecutive test matches against England in a 5-match Test series in 2024. He is the third Indian batter to achieve the feat after Vinod Kambli and Virat Kohli. Yashasvi is the third youngest cricketer in Test history to have two double centuries to his name after Sir Don Bradman and Vinod Kambli. In the same series, he equaled the world record held by Wasim Akram for the most number of sixes (12) scored by a cricketer in a test innings. Also he became only the second Indian after Sunil Gavaskar to score 700 runs in a Test series.

He was a member of the Indian squad which won the gold medal at the 2022 Asian Games in 2023 and the finalist squad of the 2020 Under-19 Cricket World Cup, where he was the Player of the Tournament and the highest run scorer. He was also a standby member of the Indian squad which played the 2023 ICC World Test Championship final and finished as runners up. He was also a part of the Indian team which won the 2024 T20 World Cup, but did not feature in any of the matches during the tournament.

== Early life ==
Yashasvi Jaiswal was born on 28 December 2001 in Suriyawan, Bhadohi, Uttar Pradesh, as the youngest of four children, to Bhupendra Jaiswal, the owner of a small hardware store, and Kanchan Jaiswal, a housewife. He has an older brother and two older sisters. At the age of ten, he moved to Mumbai to receive cricket training at Azad Maidan. He was initially given accommodation in a dairy shop in return for work but was evicted by the shopkeeper as he was unable to work frequently due to his practice schedules. As a result, he lived in a tent with the groundsmen at the Maidan, where he sold panipuri to make ends meet.

After living in tents for three years, Jaiswal's cricketing potential was spotted in December 2013 by Jwala Singh, who ran a cricket academy in Santacruz. He provided Jaiswal with a place to stay, before becoming his legal guardian and obtaining his power of attorney.

== Youth career ==
Jaiswal first came to prominence in 2015 when he scored 319 not out and took 13/99 in a Giles Shield match, an all-round record in schools cricket in India. He was selected for the Mumbai under-16 squad and later the India national under-19 cricket team. He scored 318 runs and became player of the tournament at the 2018 Under-19 Asia Cup which India won.

In 2019, Jaiswal scored 173 from 220 balls in a Youth Test match against South Africa under-19s. Later that year, he scored 294 runs in seven matches, including four half-centuries, in the under-19 tri-series in England. In December 2019, he was named in India's squad for the 2020 Under-19 Cricket World Cup. Jaiswal was the leading run scorer in 2020 Under-19 Cricket World Cup and went on to win Player of the tournament which includes a century in the semifinal against Pakistan.

== Domestic career ==
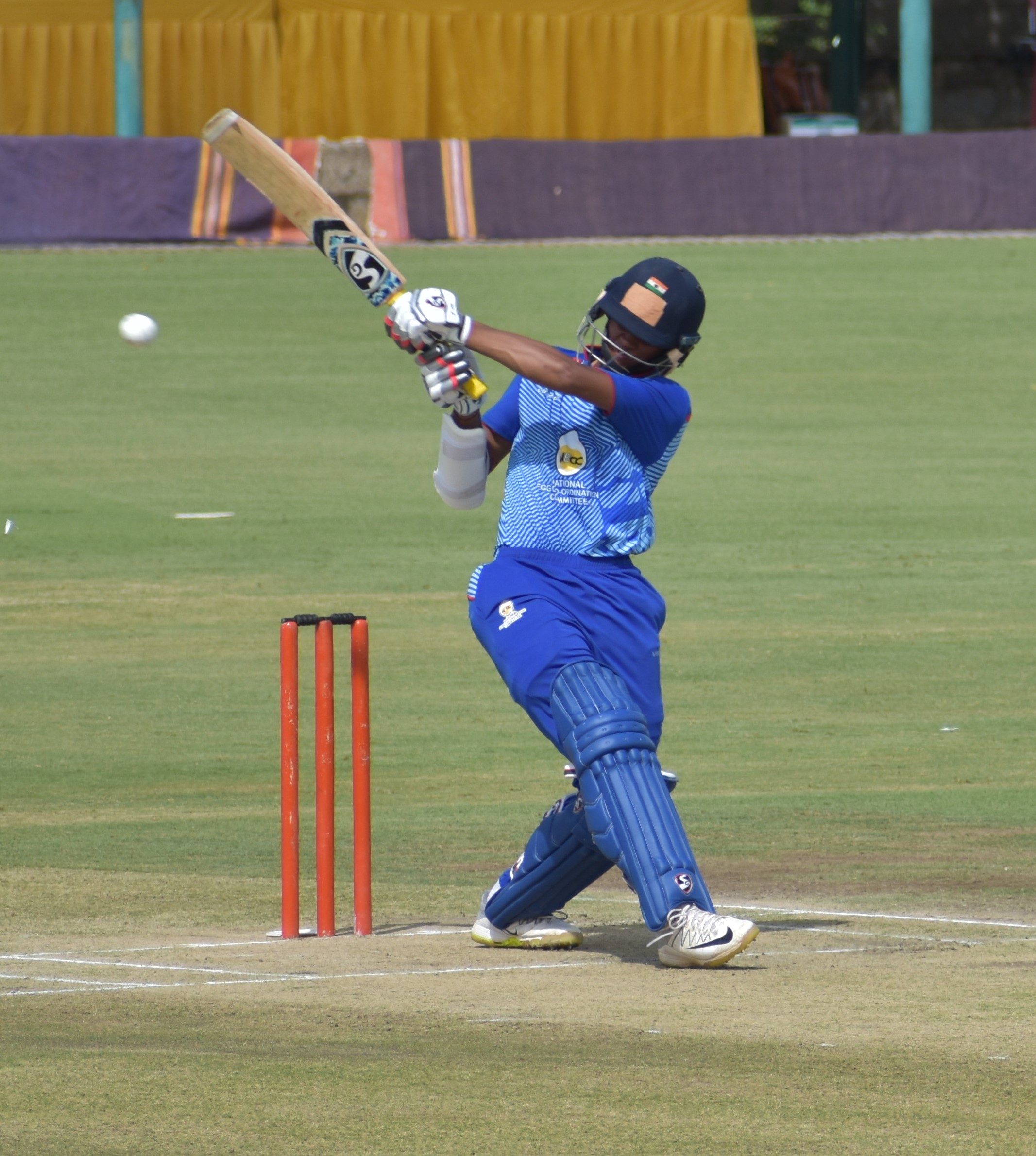
Jaiswal in 2019

Jaiswal made his first-class debut for Mumbai in the 2018–19 Ranji Trophy on 7 January 2019 and his List A debut on 28 September 2019 in the 2019–20 Vijay Hazare Trophy. On 16 October 2019, he scored 203 runs from 154 balls in a Vijay Hazare Trophy match against Jharkhand and became the youngest double centurion in the history of List A cricket at 17 years, 292 days. His innings included 17 fours and 12 sixes and he was one of the top five run-scorers during the competition, scoring 564 runs in six matches at a batting average of 112.80. He was named in the India B squad for the 2019–20 Deodhar Trophy.

== International career ==
Jaiswal playing a Test match for India against New Zealand in November 2026

In June 2023, Jaiswal received his maiden call up to India's Test squad for the series against the West Indies. He made his debut in the first Test of the series, hitting a century while opening the batting with a score of 171 runs. He also received the Player of the Match award. He made his T20I debut in the 3rd match of the T20I series against West Indies in August 2023. He scored his maiden T20I half-century –84* off 51 balls – in the fourth match of the series while sharing a 165-run opening partnership with Shubman Gill.

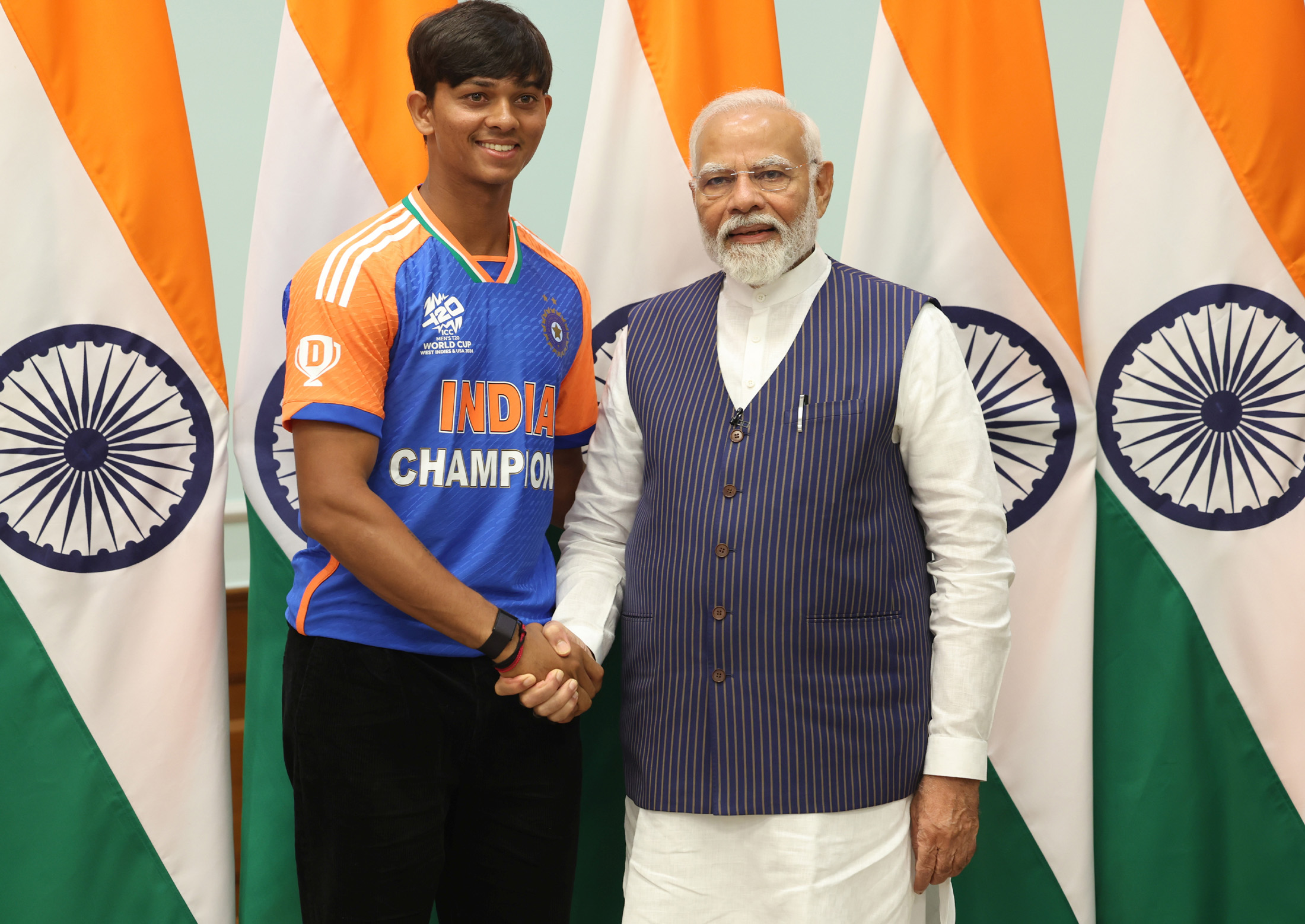
Jaiswal meeting Narendra Modi in 2024

In January 2024, he was selected in India's squad for the 5-match Test series against England at home. In the first innings of the first Test, he scored 80 runs off just 74 balls. In the second match of the series, he made his maiden double century, scoring 209 runs off 290 balls in the first innings. He became the third youngest Indian batsman, after Sunil Gavaskar and Vinod Kambli, to score a double hundred in Test cricket. In the next match of the series, Jaiswal scored another double century, becoming third Indian batter after Vinod Kambli and Virat Kohli to hit double centuries in consecutive Test matches. He also hit 12 sixes during the innings, equaling the record of most sixes in a Test innings.

Jaiswal is the first player in Test history to hit 20 sixes in a series. After Sunil Gavaskar, he is the second Indian to score 500 runs in a Test series at the age of 22. He also scored the most runs for an Indian in a Test series against England.

He was nominated by International Cricket Council for ICC Men's Player of the Month Award for the month of February 2024. In May 2024, he was named in India's squad for the 2024 ICC Men's T20 World Cup tournament.

In the 2024-25 Border-Gavaskar Trophy, he was the highest run-scorer for India with 391 runs averaging at 43.44. In the second innings of the first Test, Jaiswal scored 161 runs. Jasprit Bumrah said it was Jaiswal's best Test innings yet. Yashasvi Jaiswal made history by scoring centuries on his maiden Tests in the West Indies (debut, 171 runs), Australia (161 runs in Perth), and England (101 runs at Leeds). Notably, he became the first visiting batter to achieve centuries on debut in both England and Australia, showcasing his exceptional batting skills across different conditions.

On 6 February 2025, Jaiswal made his ODI debut against England. He made 15 runs off 22 balls. In the Anderson–Tendulkar Trophy he scored two centuries, one in the first test match of the series scoring 101 and second in last test match of the series 118. In late-2025, he was selected for the three-match ODI series against South Africa at home, replacing the injured ODI captain Shubman Gill. In the last match of the ODI series, he went on to make his maiden ODI century, remaining unbeaten on 116* off 121 deliveries. He was named the Player of the Match too, helping India clinch the series 2–1.

== List of International Cricket centuries ==
Yashasvi Jaiswal has scored 10 international centuries - 7 in Test Cricket, 2 in One Day International and 1 in Twenty20 international.

=== Test cricket centuries ===
No.	Runs	Balls	Against	Pos.	Inn.	Venue	H/A	Date	Result
1	171	387	West Indies	1	2	Windsor Park, Dominica	Away	12 July 2023	Won
2	209	290	England	1	1	ACA-VDCA Cricket Stadium, Visakhapatnam	Home	2 February 2024	Won
3	214*	236	England	1	3	Saurashtra Cricket Association Stadium, Rajkot	Home	15 February 2024	Won
4	161	297	Australia	1	3	Optus Stadium, Perth	Away	22 November 2024	Won
5	101	159	England	1	1	Headingley, Leeds	Away	20 June 2025	Lost
6	118	164	England	1	3	The Oval, London	Away	31 July 2025	Won
7	175	258	West Indies	1	1	Arun Jaitley Cricket Stadium, Delhi	Home	10 October 2025	Won

=== ODI Centuries ===
No.	Runs	Balls Faced	Against	Pos.	Inn.	S/R	Venue	H/A/N	Date	Result
1	116*	121	South Africa	1	2	95.87	ACA-VDCA Cricket Stadium, Visakhapatnam	Home	6 December 2025	Won
2	110*	86	Afghanistan	1	2	127.91	MA Chidambaram Stadium , Chennai	Home	20 June 2026	Won

=== T20I Centuries ===
No.	Runs	Balls Faced	Against	Pos.	Inn.	S/R	Venue	H/A/N	Date	Result
1	100	49	Nepal	1	1	204.08	Zhejiang University of Technology Cricket Field, Hangzhou	Neutral	3 October 2023	Won

== Franchise career ==
In the 2020 IPL auction, he was bought by the Rajasthan Royals and made his Twenty20 cricket debut for the team on 22 September 2020. He made his maiden T20 half-century against Chennai Super Kings on 2 October 2021, the second fastest in franchise history at the time, and his maiden T20 century on 30 April 2023, scoring 124 from 62 balls against Mumbai Indians and recording the 2nd highest score in an IPL match at the Wankhede Stadium.

On 11 May 2023 he hit the fastest Indian Premier League (IPL) half-century in just 13 balls against Kolkata Knight Riders, surpassing the previous record jointly held by KL Rahul and Pat Cummins. He finished the 2023 Indian Premier League as Rajasthan's leading run scorer with 625 runs in 14 matches.

In the 2024 season, Jaiswal scored an unbeaten 104 to lead Rajasthan Royals to victory over Mumbai Indians. The Royals eventually made it to the playoffs, but lost to Sunrisers Hyderabad in the semi-final.
