= Ojay Shields =

Jamaican cricketer

Personal information
- Born: 14 February 1996 (age 30); Jamaica
- Batting: Right-handed
- Bowling: Right-arm medium-fast

International information
- National side: West Indies (2025–present)
- Test debut (cap 347): 2 December 2025 v New Zealand
- Last Test: 10 December 2025 v New Zealand

Domestic team information
- Years: Team
- 2017/18–present: Combined Campuses and Colleges
- 2022/23–present: Jamaica

Career statistics
Competition	Test	FC	LA
Matches	2	18	11
Runs scored	9	167	3
Batting average	3.00	7.95	1.00
100s/50s	0/0	0/0	0/0
Top score	9	22	3
Balls bowled	252	2,151	336
Wickets	5	39	6
Bowling average	35.20	36.84	60.16
5 wickets in innings	0	0	0
10 wickets in match	0	0	–
Best bowling	2/34	4/86	2/44
Catches/stumpings	0/–	4/–	3/–
- Source: Cricinfo, 11 December 2025

Ojay Shields (born 14 February 1996) is a Jamaican cricketer who currently plays for Combined Campuses and Colleges and Jamaica in domestic cricket. He has represented the West Indies in international cricket.

== Early life ==
He held the post of the Physical Education (PE) teacher at Enid Bennett High School in Jamaica.

== Career ==
He made his List A debut on 1 February 2018, playing for the Combined Campuses and Colleges against the Trinidad and Tobago in the 2017–18 Regional Super50. He made his first class debut for the Jamaica against Barbados in the 2022–23 West Indies Championship on 8 February 2023.

In November 2025, Shields was named in West Indies Test squad for their series against New Zealand. On 2 December 2025, he made his international (Test) debut for West Indies against New Zealand at Hagley Oval in Christchurch.
