= List of international cricket centuries by Ross Taylor =

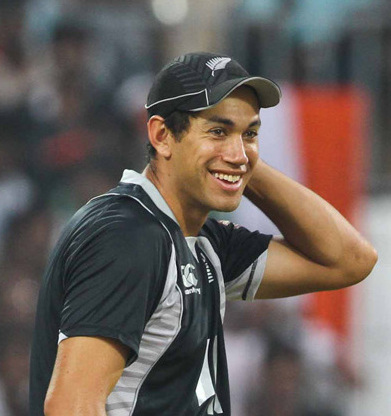
Ross Taylor's 40 centuries in international cricket are the most by a New Zealander.

Ross Taylor is a former cricketer who represented the New Zealand national cricket team. He has scored 19 centuries (100 or more runs in a single innings) in Test and 21 in One Day International (ODI) matches. Taylor made his Test debut against South Africa at New Wanderers Stadium, Johannesburg, in November 2007. His first century came four months later against England at the Seddon Park, Hamilton. His highest score of 290 came against Australia at the WACA Ground, Perth in 2015. Taylor has scored Test centuries at ten cricket grounds, including seven at venues outside New Zealand. He has scored his nineteen Test centuries against eight different opponents and most of his centuries (four) have come against the West Indies.

Taylor made his ODI debut in March 2006 against West Indies at McLean Park, Napier. His first century came in December 2006 against Sri Lanka at the same ground; he scored 128 not out in the match which New Zealand lost by seven wickets. His highest ODI score of 181 not out came against England at the University Oval in March 2018. Taylor's 102 not out (off 70 balls) against Pakistan in February 2015 is the fifth-fastest century by a New Zealander in ODIs. He has not scored any centuries in Twenty20 International (T20I) matches. As of December 2019, Taylor is joint 16th in the list of century-makers in international cricket with 40, and the highest ranked New Zealander.

== Key ==
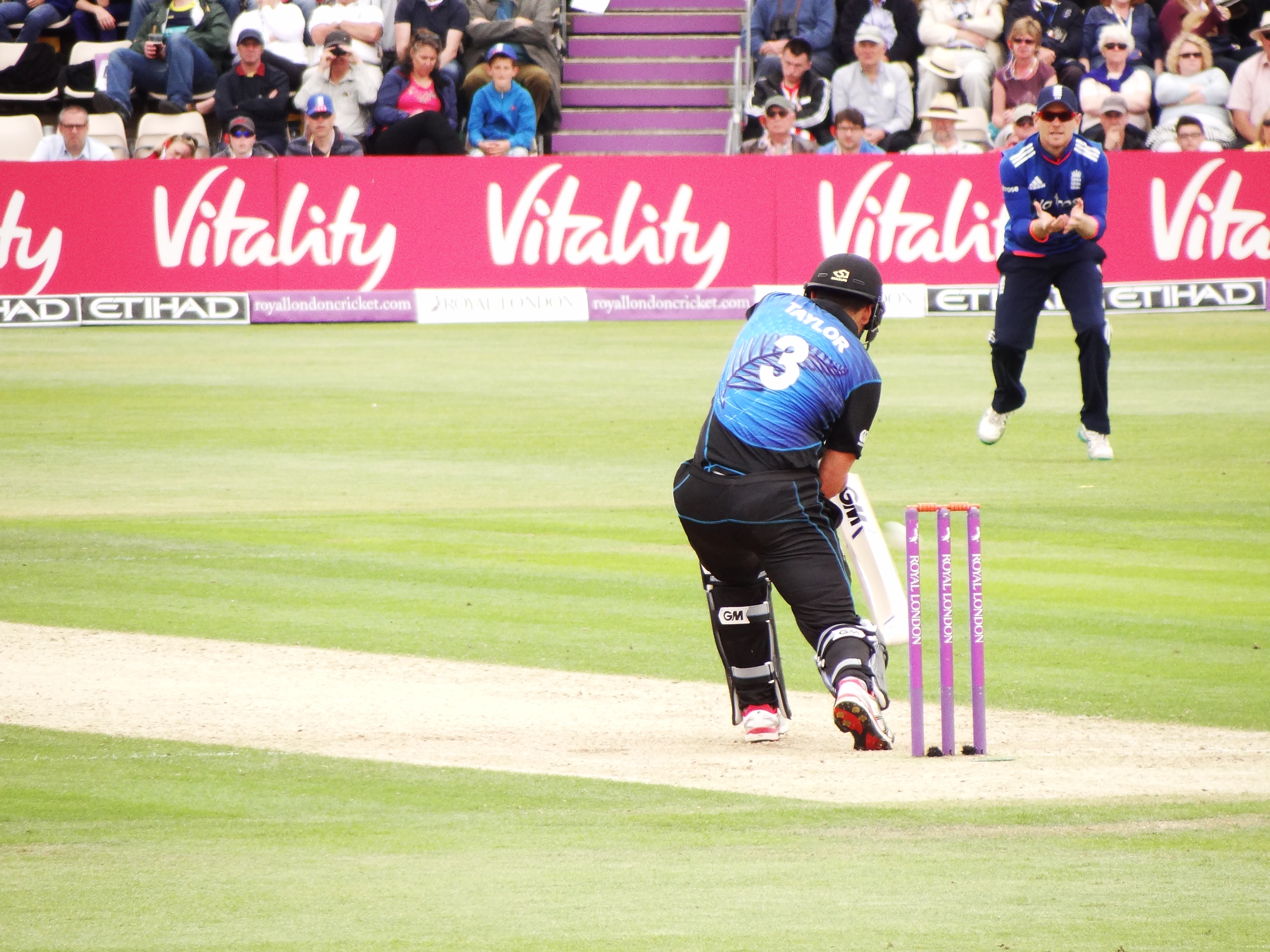
Ross Taylor batting against England in 2015

Key
Symbol	Meaning
*	Remained not out
†	Man of the match
Match	Matches played
Pos.	Position in the batting order
Inn.	The innings of the match
Test	The number of the Test match played in that series
S/R	Strike rate during the innings
H/A/N	Venue was at home (New Zealand), away or neutral
Date	Date the match was held, or the starting date of match for Test matches
Lost	The match was lost by New Zealand
Won	The match was won by New Zealand
Drawn	The match was drawn

== Test centuries ==
List of Test centuries scored by Ross Taylor
No.	Score	Against	Pos.	Inn.	Test	Venue	H/A/N	Date	Result	Ref
1	120	England	5	1	1/3	Seddon Park, Hamilton	Home	5 March 2008	Won	
2	154*	England	4	1	2/3	Old Trafford, Manchester	Away	23 May 2008	Lost	
3	151	India	4	1	2/3	McLean Park, Napier	Home	26 March 2009	Drawn	
4	107	India	4	4	3/3	Basin Reserve, Wellington	Home	3 April 2009	Drawn	
5	138	Australia	4	2	2/2	Seddon Park, Hamilton	Home	27 March 2010	Lost	
6	122*	Zimbabwe	4	1	1/1	McLean Park, Napier	Home	26 January 2012	Won	
7	113	India	4	1	2/2	M. Chinnaswamy Stadium, Bangalore	Away	31 August 2012	Lost	
8	142 †	Sri Lanka	4	1	2/2	Paikiasothy Saravanamuttu Stadium, Colombo	Away	25 November 2012	Won	
9	217* †	West Indies	4	1	1/3	University of Otago Oval, Dunedin	Home	3 December 2013	Drawn	
10	129	West Indies	4	1	2/3	Basin Reserve, Wellington	Home	11 December 2013	Won	
11	131 †	West Indies	4	2	3/3	Seddon Park, Hamilton	Home	19 December 2013	Won	
12	104 †	Pakistan	4	3	2/3	Dubai International Cricket Stadium, Dubai	Neutral	17 November 2014	Drawn	
13	290 †	Australia	4	2	2/3	WACA Ground, Perth	Away	13 November 2015	Drawn	
14	173* †	Zimbabwe	4	2	1/2	Queens Sports Club, Bulawayo	Away	28 July 2016	Won	
15	124*	Zimbabwe	4	1	2/2	Queens Sports Club, Bulawayo	Away	6 August 2016	Won	
16	102*	Pakistan	4	3	2/2	Seddon Park, Hamilton	Home	25 November 2016	Won	
17	107* †	West Indies	4	3	2/2	Seddon Park, Hamilton	Home	9 December 2017	Won	
18	200 †	Bangladesh	4	2	2/3	Basin Reserve, Wellington	Home	8 March 2019	Won	
19	105*	England	4	3	2/2	Seddon Park, Hamilton	Home	29 November 2019	Drawn	

== One Day International centuries ==
List of ODI centuries scored by Ross Taylor
No.	Score	Against	Pos.	Inn.	S/R	Venue	H/A/N	Date	Result	Ref
1	128*	Sri Lanka	3	1	96.24	McLean Park, Napier	Home	28 December 2006	Lost	
2	117 †	Australia	3	2	92.12	Eden Park, Auckland	Home	18 February 2007	Won	
3	103 †	Bangladesh	4	1	86.55	Chittagong Divisional Stadium, Chittagong	Away	14 October 2008	Won	
4	131* †	Pakistan	4	1	105.64	Pallekele International Cricket Stadium, Pallekele	Neutral	8 March 2011	Won	
5	119	Zimbabwe	4	1	94.44	Queens Sports Club, Bulawayo	Away	25 October 2011	Lost	
6	110	West Indies	4	2	95.65	Warner Park, Basseterre, Saint Kitts	Away	14 July 2012	Lost	
7	100	England	4	1	85.47	McLean Park, Napier	Home	20 February 2013	Lost	
8	107*	Bangladesh	4	1	115.05	Khan Shaheb Osman Ali Stadium, Fatullah	Away	3 November 2013	Lost	
9	112* †	India	4	2	88.18	Seddon Park, Hamilton	Home	28 January 2014	Won	
10	102 †	India	4	1	96.22	Wellington Regional Stadium, Wellington	Home	31 January 2014	Won	
11	105*	Pakistan	4	1	77.77	Dubai International Cricket Stadium, Dubai	Neutral	8 December 2014	Lost	
12	102*	Pakistan	4	1	145.71	McLean Park, Napier	Home	3 February 2015	Won	
13	119* †	England	4	1	123.95	The Oval, London	Away	12 June 2015	Won	
14	110	England	4	2	89.43	Rose Bowl, Southampton	Away	14 June 2015	Won	
15	112*	Zimbabwe	4	1	91.80	Harare Sports Club, Harare	Away	2 August 2015	Lost	
16	107	Australia	4	1	105.94	Seddon Park, Hamilton	Home	5 February 2017	Won	
17	102* †	South Africa	4	1	92.72	Hagley Oval, Christchurch	Home	22 February 2017	Won	
18	113 †	England	4	2	97.41	Seddon Park, Hamilton	Home	25 February 2018	Won	
19	181* †	England	4	2	123.12	University Oval, Dunedin	Home	7 March 2018	Won	
20	137 †	Sri Lanka	4	1	104.58	Saxton Oval, Nelson	Home	8 January 2019	Won	
21	109* †	India	4	2	129.76	Seddon Park, Hamilton	Home	5 February 2020	Won	
