= Rhys Mariu =

New Zealand cricketer (born 2001)

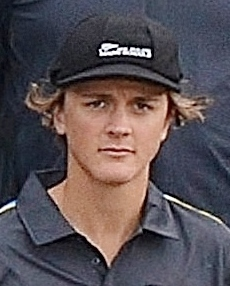
- Mariu in 2019

Personal information
- Full name: Rhys Andrew Mariu
- Born: 15 December 2001 (age 24); Christchurch, New Zealand
- Height: 1.88 m (6 ft 2 in)
- Batting: Right-handed
- Bowling: Right-arm medium
- Role: Batsman

International information
- National side: New Zealand (2025)
- ODI debut (cap 223): 2 April 2025 v Pakistan
- Last ODI: 5 April 2025 v Pakistan
- ODI shirt no.: 27

Domestic team information
- Years: Team
- 2022/23–: Canterbury

Career statistics
| Competition | ODI | FC | LA | T20 |
|---|---|---|---|---|
| Matches | 2 | 27 | 27 | 9 |
| Runs scored | 76 | 2,372 | 772 | 120 |
| Batting average | 38.00 | 55.16 | 32.16 | 17.14 |
| 100s/50s | 0/1 | 8/8 | 0/4 | 0/0 |
| Top score | 58 | 249 | 87 | 43 |
| Catches/stumpings | 0/– | 36/– | 11/– | 0/– |
- Source: Cricinfo, 30 March 2026

Rhys Andrew Mariu (born 15 December 2001) is a New Zealand cricketer who has played for Canterbury since the 2022–23 season. He played his first match for New Zealand in a One-Day International in April 2025.

== Career ==
Mariu was born in Christchurch and grew up in Woodend and Rangiora in North Canterbury. He attended St Andrew's College, Christchurch. As of 2024, Mariu is studying law and commerce at the University of Canterbury.

An opening batsman, Mariu has played Hawke Cup cricket for Canterbury Country since 2019–20. He made his first-class debut in the 2022–23 Plunket Shield season, scoring 68 and 78 not out in Canterbury's victory over Northern Districts. He did not play in the opening round of the 2024–25 Plunket Shield season, but in the second round, captaining Canterbury for the first time, he scored 240 in Canterbury's victory over Central Districts. In his next match a few days later, he scored 185, giving him 1,122 runs after 10 first-class matches at an average of 70.12.

Mariu was named in the New Zealand squad for the One-Day International series against Pakistan in April 2025. He made his international debut in the second ODI in Hamilton, scoring 18 off 25 balls as New Zealand won by 84 runs. In the third match he scored his maiden ODI half-century, 58 off 61 balls, in New Zealand's victory by 43 runs at Bay Oval.

Mariu toured South Africa with New Zealand A in August–September 2025. In the two unofficial Tests against South Africa A he scored 249 (off 258 balls), 30 and 135.
