= Gurnoor Brar =

Indian Cricketer (Born 2000)

Personal information
- Full name: Gurnoor Singh Brar
- Born: 25 May 2000 (age 26); Muktsar, Punjab, India
- Height: 6 ft 5 in (196 cm)
- Batting: Left-Handed
- Bowling: Right-Arm fast
- Role: Bowler

International information
- National side: India (2026–present)
- ODI debut (cap 262): 13 June 2026 v Afghanistan
- Last ODI: 7 November 2026 v New Zealand
- ODI shirt no.: 15

Domestic team information
- Years: Team
- 2022/23–present: Punjab
- 2023: Punjab Kings
- 2025–present: Gujarat Titans

Career statistics
Competition	ODI	FC	LA	T20
Matches	13	18	12	9
Runs scored	3	304	29	18
Batting average	3.00	15.20	7.25	6.00
100s/50s	0/0	0/1	0/0	0/0
Top score	3	64	25	8
Balls bowled	137	2,356	571	187
Wickets	23	52	23	10
Bowling average	31.48	27.30	31.48	33.70
5 wickets in innings	0	1	0	0
10 wickets in match	0	0	–	–
Best bowling	3/27	5/14	4/57	3/23
Catches/stumpings	1/–	4/–	4/–	5/–
- Source: Cricinfo, 29 June 2026

Gurnoor Brar (born 25 May 2000) is an Indian international cricketer who plays as a right-arm fast bowler. He has played for India since 2026 and Punjab since 2022. In the Indian Premier League (IPL), he has represented Gujarat Titans since 2025 and Punjab Kings in 2023.

== Domestic Career ==
Before his professional debut, Brar was a net bowler for five-time champions Mumbai Indians in the 2019 Indian Premier League.

On 14 December 2022, Brar made his professional, and List A debut for Punjab against Goa. On 20 December 2022, Brar made his first-class debut for Punjab against Railways.

On 10 January 2023, during a Ranji Trophy match against Jammu and Kashmir, Brar made the headlines after he stabilized Punjab's first innings by scoring 64 and was in a 100-run partnership with Siddharth Kaul, which helped them win by 4 wickets.

== Franchise Career ==
Brar was bought by Punjab Kings for the 2023 Indian Premier League season as a replacement for Raj Bawa for Rs. 20 Lakhs. He made his IPL, and Twenty20 debut for Punjab Kings against Lucknow Super Giants, on 28 April 2023.

== International Career ==
He was named in India's Test and One Day International (ODI) squads for the 2026 home series against Afghanistan, and made his international debut in the first ODI on 13 June.
