= Glenn Phillips (cricketer) =

New Zealand cricketer (born 1996)

- Phillips playing for New Zealand in 2026

Personal information
- Full name: Glenn Dominic Phillips
- Born: 6 December 1996 (age 29); East London, South Africa
- Batting: Right-handed
- Bowling: Right arm off-break
- Role: Occasionally Wicket-keeper-batter / All-rounder
- Relatives: Dale Phillips (brother)

International information
- National side: New Zealand (2017–present)
- Test debut (cap 278): 3 January 2020 v Australia
- Last Test: 17 June 2026 v England
- ODI debut (cap 204): 10 July 2022 v Ireland
- Last ODI: 7 November 2026 v India
- ODI shirt no.: 23
- T20I debut (cap 74): 17 February 2017 v South Africa
- Last T20I: 1 November 2026 v India
- T20I shirt no.: 23

Domestic team information
- Years: Team
- 2014/15–2021/22: Auckland
- 2017–2020: Jamaica Tallawahs
- 2021–2022: Gloucestershire
- 2021, 2023–2024: Welsh Fire
- 2021: Barbados Royals
- 2021: Rajasthan Royals
- 2022/23–: Otago
- 2023: Sunrisers Hyderabad
- 2024: Colombo Strikers
- 2025–present: Gujarat Titans

Career statistics
Competition	Test	ODI	T20I	FC
Matches	19	49	102	69
Runs scored	956	1,292	2,627	4,329
Batting average	35.40	40.37	35.02	40.45
100s/50s	1/5	2/5	3/15	9/26
Top score	100	106*	108	147
Balls bowled	1,722	816	230	5,099
Wickets	33	16	9	82
Bowling average	31.03	51.56	36.33	36.37
5 wickets in innings	1	0	0	1
10 wickets in match	0	0	0	0
Best bowling	5/45	3/37	3/6	5/45
Catches/stumpings	20/–	30/–	68/2	66/–
Medal record
Men's Cricket
Representing New Zealand
ICC T20 World Cup
Runner-up	2021 UAE & Oman
Runner-up	2026 India & Sri Lanka
ICC Champions Trophy
Runner-up	2025 Pakistan
- Source: Cricinfo, 7 November 2026

Glenn Dominic Phillips (born 6 December 1996) is a New Zealand professional cricket all-rounder who bats right-handed, bowls right-arm off-spin and occasionally keeps wicket. He represents New Zealand in international cricket, Otago in domestic cricket and the Gujarat Titans in the Indian Premier League (IPL). Having begun his domestic career with Auckland and made his international debut in 2017, Phillips has played extensively in limited-overs leagues around the world, including the Caribbean Premier League (CPL), the Lanka Premier League (LPL) and Major League Cricket (MLC), alongside The Hundred and the T20 Blast in England.

== Early life and education ==
Phillips was born in East London, South Africa, and emigrated to New Zealand with his family at the age of five. His parents played field hockey at a competitive level in South Africa, whereas his grandfather was a club footballer. He was educated at Sacred Heart College, Auckland, where he played cricket.

== Career ==
=== Domestic and franchise career ===
Phillips made his List A debut on 24 January 2015 in the Ford Trophy.

Phillips made his Twenty20 debut on 4 December 2016 in the 2016–17 Super Smash against Otago, scoring 55 from 32 deliveries opening the batting. He was the highest run-scorer in the competition during the season, with 369 runs. He scored his first century, 116 not out, in Auckland's final group-stage match against Central Districts, becoming the second domestic player since Hamish Marshall to score centuries in all three forms of the game and the first to do so within a single domestic season.

He made his first-class debut on 6 March 2017 in the 2016–17 Plunket Shield season against Canterbury. In June 2018, he was awarded a contract with Auckland for the 2018–19 season.

Ahead of the 2018 Caribbean Premier League, he was named as one of five players to watch in the tournament. In June 2020, he was offered a contract by Auckland ahead of the 2020–21 domestic cricket season. In July 2020, he was named in the Jamaica Tallawahs squad for the 2020 Caribbean Premier League. In 2021, he played for Welsh Fire in the inaugural season of the Hundred. In August 2021, he was named in the Barbados Royals' squad for the 2021 Caribbean Premier League.

In February 2022, he was bought by Sunrisers Hyderabad in the auction for the 2022 Indian Premier League tournament. In April 2022, Phillips was re-signed by Gloucestershire for the 2022 T20 Blast in England. In April 2022, Phillips signed to play for Otago for the 2022–23 domestic season in New Zealand. He joined younger brother Dale at Otago and stated his desire to become a genuine all-rounder under coach Dion Ebrahim. As he secured a central New Zealand cricket contract in May 2022, his deal did not contribute to the Otago salary bill.

Phillips played for the Washington Freedom in the inaugural 2023 season of Major League Cricket and returned to the franchise for the 2025 season.

=== International career ===
Phillips, alongside Henry Nicholls, playing a Test match for New Zealand against India in November 2026

After having been a member of New Zealand's squad for the 2016 Under-19 Cricket World Cup, Phillips was added to New Zealand's Twenty20 International (T20I) squad for their series against South Africa in February 2017 as a replacement for the injured Martin Guptill. He made his debut during the series and in October was named in the One Day International (ODI) squad against India. He did not play in the ODI series, but did play in the second and third T20Is of the series and retained his place in the team against the West Indian and Pakistani teams which toured New Zealand later in the season.

Phillips played more Twenty20 Internationals later in the year, although he then dropped out of the New Zealand team, not playing at all in 2019. In January 2020 he was flown to Sydney ahead of New Zealand's third Test match on their tour of Australia as cover for Kane Williamson and Henry Nicholls who were ill. With neither player able to take part in the match, Phillips made his Test debut, top-scoring in New Zealand's first innings with 52 runs. He came back into New Zealand's T20I team in November 2020, the first T20I series involving the team after the COVID-19 pandemic had led to most of their scheduled matches during the year being cancelled. In the second match against the West Indies he scored his first century in T20I cricket. The innings, in which Phillips scored 108 runs, saw him reach his century in 46 balls, setting a new record for the fastest century by a New Zealand batsman in a Twenty20 International match.

More T20I appearances followed, and in May 2021 Phillips was awarded his first central contract by New Zealand Cricket. In August he was named in the squad for the 2021 ICC Men's T20 World Cup, playing in each of the team's matches in the competition and scoring a total of 105 runs as New Zealand reached the final. The following June he was named in New Zealand's ODI and T20I squads for their tours of Ireland, Scotland and the Netherlands. He made his ODI debut on 10 July 2022 against Ireland and went on to play in each ODI and all but one of the T20I matches on the tour.

Later in 2022, Phillips was part of New Zealand's squad for the 2022 ICC Men's T20 World Cup in Australia. He scored his second Twenty20 International century against Sri Lanka, making a score of 104 in the team's second group game of the competition. He finished the World Cup as the team's leading run scorer with 201 runs; as well as his century he scored 62 against England in the group stage. The following year saw Phillips named in the squad for the 2023 Cricket World Cup in India. He played in all of the team's matches during the competition, scoring 285 runs as New Zealand reached the semi-final.

Following the World Cup, Phillips was selected in New Zealand's Test squad for the tour of Bangladesh. He played in both Test matches, his first Tests since his debut in early 2020. In the first match he took four wickets in the first innings, his first in Test cricket, and another in the second, and in the second Test made scores of 87 and 40 not out and took another three wickets. He retained his place in the Test team for the tours by South Africa and Australia in 2023–24 and played in all three T20Is against Bangladesh and all five against Pakistan, scoring 70 not out from 52 balls in the fourth match against Pakistan as part of a match-winning partnership of 139 runs with Daryl Mitchell.

In May 2024, he was named in New Zealand’s squad for the 2024 ICC Men's T20 World Cup tournament.

In January 2026, Phillips was named in New Zealand's 15 man squad for the 2026 ICC Men's T20 World Cup tournament.

On 21 January 2026, Phillips became the fourth New Zealand cricketer to score over 2,000 runs in T-20 Internationals, reaching the milestone in his 84th T20I during the first match against India in Nagpur, where he scored 78 off 40 balls.

On 18 June 2026, Phillips made his maiden Test century, scoring exactly 100 for New Zealand against England at The Oval in London.

On 30 October, 2026, Phillips hit his 3rd T20I century against India during the 4th T20I, finishing on 107 runs off 49 deliveries. The century came in 46 balls, which is his joint quickest. His innings powered New Zealand to their highest ever T20I score, at 259/7. He was named player of the match as New Zealand won by 87 runs. Phillips broke the record for most runs scored in a single bilateral T20I series, with 341 runs across 5 innings.

== Personal life ==
Phillips was diagnosed with attention deficit hyperactivity disorder (ADHD) during his childhood. Phillips has described his ADHD condition as "a little switch that flicks me above the rest when I have to bring out the energy."

Phillips obtained his pilot licence in September 2025.
