= Suriyawan =

Town in Sant Ravidas Nagar, Uttar Pradesh

- Town
- Location in Uttar Pradesh, India
- Coordinates: 25°28′N 82°25′E
- Country: India
- State: Uttar Pradesh
- District: Bhadohi

Government
  - Type: Nagar Panchayat

Population (2011)
  - Total: 18,843

Languages
  - Official: Hindi, Urdu
- Time zone: UTC+5:30 (IST)
- PIN: 221404
- Vehicle registration: UP-66

Suriyawan is a town and a nagar panchayat in Bhadohi district in the Indian state of Uttar Pradesh.

== Demographics ==
According to 2011 census of India, Suriyawan had a population of 18,843. Males constitute 52% of the population and females 48%. In Suriyawan, 16% of the population is under 6 years of age.
