= Cameron Paul =

New Zealand cricketer

Personal information
- Full name: Cameron Behrnes Paul
- Born: 29 December 2004 (age 21); Christchurch, New Zealand
- Batting: Right-handed
- Bowling: Right-arm fast

Domestic team information
- Years: Team
- 2023/24–: Canterbury

Career statistics
Competition	FC	LA	T20
Matches	5	3	5
Runs scored	111	0	5
Batting average	18.50	0.00	5.00
100s/50s	0/0	0/0	0/0
Top score	35	0	3*
Balls bowled	756	72	84
Wickets	23	5	7
Bowling average	21.78	12.00	18.14
5 wickets in innings	2	0	0
10 wickets in match	0	–	–
Best bowling	5/34	3/17	3/32
Catches/stumpings	2/–	0/–	1/–
- Source: Cricinfo, 11 January 2026

Cameron Behrnes Paul (born 29 December 2004) is a New Zealand cricketer who has played for Canterbury since the 2023–24 season.

Paul was born in Christchurch and attended Christchurch Boys' High School and St Andrews College. A fast bowler and middle-order batter, he has played Hawke Cup cricket for Canterbury Country since 2023–24.

Paul made his first-class debut in the 2024–25 Plunket Shield season, taking 5 for 34 in the first innings in Canterbury's victory over Central Districts. In his first List A match, a year earlier, he took 3 for 17 when Canterbury beat Wellington.
