= Henry Nicholls (cricketer) =

New Zealander cricketer (born 1991)

- Nicholls playing for New Zealand in 2026

Personal information
- Full name: Henry Michael Nicholls
- Born: 15 November 1991 (age 35); Christchurch, New Zealand
- Batting: Left-handed
- Bowling: Right-arm off-break
- Role: Top-order batter

International information
- National side: New Zealand (2015–present)
- Test debut (cap 269): 12 February 2016 v Australia
- Last Test: 25 June 2026 v England
- ODI debut (cap 189): 26 December 2015 v Sri Lanka
- Last ODI: 7 November 2026 v India
- ODI shirt no.: 86
- T20I debut (cap 69): 26 March 2016 v Bangladesh
- Last T20I: 10 September 2021 v Bangladesh
- T20I shirt no.: 86

Domestic team information
- Years: Team
- 2011/12–present: Canterbury
- 2015/16: Sydney Thunder
- 2018: Derbyshire
- 2025: Worcestershire
- 2026: Somerset

Career statistics
Competition	Test	ODI	T20I	FC
Matches	60	94	10	147
Runs scored	3,358	2,435	100	9,378
Batting average	39.50	32.03	12.50	42.62
100s/50s	11/12	1/17	0/0	24/47
Top score	200*	124*	36*	226
Catches/stumpings	36/–	41/–	3/–	134/–
Medal record
Men's Cricket
Representing New Zealand
ICC Cricket World Cup
Runner-up	2019 England and Wales
ICC World Test Championship
Winner	2019-2021
- Source: ESPNcricinfo, 7 November 2026

Henry Michael Nicholls (born 15 November 1991) is a New Zealand professional cricket left-handed batter who represents the New Zealand national team and Canterbury. He was a member of the squads that won the 2019–2021 World Test Championship and finished runners-up at the 2019 Cricket World Cup.

== Career ==
Nicholls playing a Test match for New Zealand against India in November 2026

Nicholls made his domestic debut for Canterbury on 7 November 2011 at the 2011–12 Plunket Shield season. His maiden first-class career century was against Wellington at the start of the 2014–15 season.

In December 2015, Nicholls was named in New Zealand's One Day International (ODI) squad for their series against Sri Lanka. He made his ODI debut on 26 December 2015 at Hagley Oval, Christchurch, which is his home ground for Canterbury. He scored 23 not out off 21 balls in that game as New Zealand won by 7 wickets.

He scored 82 runs, against Pakistan on 25 January 2016 at Basin Reserve, which became a match-winning knock at the end. New Zealand won the match by 70 runs and Nicholls was adjudged man of the match.

He made his Test debut on 12 February 2016 against Australia.

In February 2016, Nicholls was added to New Zealand's squad for the 2016 ICC World Twenty20 tournament, also as a backup wicketkeeper to Luke Ronchi. He made his Twenty20 International debut for New Zealand on 26 March 2016 against Bangladesh in the 2016 ICC World Twenty20 tournament.

In March 2017, during the second Test against South Africa at the Basin Reserve, Wellington, Nicholls scored his first century in Tests, scoring 118 in the first innings.

In May 2018, he was one of twenty players to be awarded a new contract for the 2018–19 season by New Zealand Cricket. In January 2019, during the third ODI against Sri Lanka, Nicholls scored his first ODI century, making 124 not out off 80 balls.

In April 2019, he was named in New Zealand's squad for the 2019 Cricket World Cup. In the final, he top scored for New Zealand with 55 runs. In November 2020, Nicholls was named in the New Zealand A cricket team for practice matches against the touring West Indies team.

In November 2023, Nicholls was reported to New Zealand Cricket for an issue surrounding ball tampering during a Plunket Shield fixture between Auckland and Canterbury. In the 32nd, 35th and 37th over Nicholls was caught rubbing the ball against his helmet. During the second ODI against Bangladesh, on 20 December 2023, he scored 95 runs and completed his 2000 runs in ODIs,

Nicholls was included in the ODI and T20I squads for the Black Caps' 2024 tour of Sri Lanka, but only featured in the ODIs.

== Personal life ==
Nicholls has two older brothers, one of whom, Willy Nicholls, is a media correspondent for the Black Caps and White Ferns.
