= 2024–25 Super Smash (men's cricket) =

New Zealand Cricket tournament

2024–25 Men's Super Smash
- Dates: 26 December 2024 – 2 February 2025
- Administrator: New Zealand Cricket
- Cricket format: Twenty20
- Tournament format(s): Double round-robin and Finals
- Champions: Central Stags (4th title)
- Runners-up: Canterbury Kings
- Participants: 6
- Matches: 32
- Most runs: Matt Boyle (377) (Canterbury Kings)
- Most wickets: Blair Tickner (16) (Central Stags)
- Official website: Super Smash

The 2024–25 Super Smash was the 20th season of the men's Super Smash Twenty20 cricket competition played in New Zealand that took place between 26 December 2024 and 2 February 2025. The Auckland Aces were the defending champions coming into the tournament.

The tournament ran alongside the 2024–25 Plunket Shield and 2024–25 Ford Trophy.

The tournament was won by the Central Stags, who defeated Canterbury in the final and was chosen to participate in the 2025 Global Super League.

== Competition format ==
Teams played in a double round-robin in a group of six, therefore playing 10 matches each. Matches were played using a Twenty20 format. The top team in the group advanced straight to the final, whilst the second and third placed teams played off in an elimination final.

The group worked on a points system with positions being based on the total points. Points were awarded as follows:

Results	Points
Win	4 points
Tie	2 points
No result	2 points
Loss	0 points

== Teams and standings ==
=== Points table ===
Pos	Team	Pld	W	L	T	NR	Pts	NRR	Qualification
1	Central Stags	10	6	2	0	2	28	0.187	Advance to Grand Final
2	Northern Brave	10	4	3	0	3	22	−0.564	Advance to Elimination Final
3	Canterbury Kings	10	4	5	0	1	18	0.280	Advance to Elimination Final
4	Wellington Firebirds	10	4	5	0	1	18	−0.115	
5	Otago Volts	10	4	5	0	1	18	−0.129	
6	Auckland Aces	10	3	5	0	2	16	0.268	

Source: Dream11 Super Smash, ESPNcricinfo

=== Match summary ===
Team	Group matches										Play-offs	
Team	1	2	3	4	5	6	7	8	9	10	EF	F
Auckland Aces	2	4	8	8	8	8	12	16	16	16		
Canterbury Kings	0	0	0	4	4	8	12	12	14	18	W	L
Central Stags	4	4	8	12	12	16	20	22	24	28	→	W
Northern Brave	2	6	6	10	14	14	16	20	22	24	L	
Otago Volts	4	6	6	10	14	18	18	18	18	18		
Wellington Firebirds	0	4	4	4	8	8	8	12	16	18		

Win	Loss	Tie	No result	Eliminated

- Note: The total points at the end of each group match are listed.
- Note: Click on the points or results to see the match summary.

== League stage ==
Match 1
26 December 2024
17:55 (D/N)
Scorecard

Northern Brave	v	Auckland Aces

Match abandoned
Seddon Park, Hamilton
Umpires: Billy Bowden and Wayne Knights

- No toss.
- No play was possible due to rain.

Match 2
27 December 2024
16:25 (D/N)
Scorecard

Otago Volts; 165/9 (20 overs)	v	Canterbury Kings; 155 (20 overs)
Max Chu 82 (46); Angus McKenzie 2/15 (2 overs)		Cole McConchie 49 (34); Dean Foxcroft 2/22 (4 overs)

Otago Volts won by 10 runs
Molyneux Park, Alexandra
Umpires: John Dempsey and Neil Louw
Player of the match: Max Chu (Otago Volts)

- Canterbury Kings won the toss and elected to field.
- Harry Chamberlain (Canterbury Kings) and Mason Clarke (Otago Volts) both made their T20 debuts.

Match 3
29 December 2024
16:25 (D/N)
Scorecard

Auckland Aces; 106 (16.1 overs)	v	Otago Volts; 26/0 (1.5 overs)
Martin Guptill 31 (23); Dean Foxcroft 4/18 (4 overs)		Dale Phillips 17* (10)

No result
Molyneux Park, Alexandra
Umpires: James Blunt and Kannan Jagannathan

- Otago Volts won the toss and elected to field.
- Siddhesh Dixit, Simon Keene and Michael Sclanders (Auckland Aces) all made their T20 debuts.

Match 4
31 December 2024
16:25 (D/N)
Scorecard

Otago Volts; 154/8 (20 overs)	v	Central Stags; 158/3 (18.5 overs)
Llew Johnson 53 (29); Blair Tickner 3/37 (4 overs)		Will Young 50 (37); Mason Clarke 1/14 (3 overs)

Central Stages won by 7 wickets
Molyneux Park, Alexandra
Umpires: James Blunt and John Dempsey
Player of the match: Tom Bruce (Central Stags)

- Otago Volts won the toss and elected to bat.
- Sam Cassidy (Central Stage) made his T20 debut.

Match 5
1 January 2025
16:25 (D/N)
Scorecard

Wellington Firebirds; 160/8 (20 overs)	v	Northern Brave; 166/4 (18.2 overs)
Nick Greenwood 48 (30); Kris Clarke 3/32 (4 overs)		Joe Carter 66 (44); Nick Greenwood 1/2 (1 over)

Northern Brave won by 6 wickets
Seddon Park, Hamilton
Umpires: Cory Black and Pete Pasco
Player of the match: Joe Carter (Northern Brave)

- Wellington Firebirds won the toss and elected to bat.
- Fergus Lellman and Ben Pomare (Northern Brave) both made their T20 debuts.

Match 6
3 January 2025
16:25 (D/N)
Scorecard

Auckland Aces; 185/8 (20 overs)	v	Canterbury Kings; 172 (19.2 overs)
Martin Guptill 60 (35); Henry Shipley 5/19 (4 overs)		Chad Bowes 56 (30); Jock McKenzie 3/31

Auckland Aces won by 13 runs
Eden Park, Auckland
Umpires: Kannan Jagannathan and Allen Stanley
Player of the match: Bevon Jacobs (Auckland Aces)

- Canterbury Kings won the toss and elected to field.
- Henry Shipley (Canterbury Kings) took his first five-wicket haul in T20s.

Match 7
4 January 2025
16:25 (D/N)
Scorecard

Wellington Firebirds; 190/5 (20 overs)	v	Central Stags; 179 (20 overs)
Tim Robinson 57 (36); Angus Schaw 3/25 (4 overs)		Jack Boyle 66 (45); James Hartshorn 5/24 (4 overs)

Wellington Firebirds won by 11 runs
Saxton Oval, Nelson
Umpires: John Dempsey and Greg Pennell
Player of the match: James Hartshorn (Wellington Firebirds)

- Wellington Firebirds won the toss and elected to bat.
- James Hartshorn (Wellington Firebirds) made his T20 debut and also took a five-wicket haul.

Match 8
6 January 2025
16:25 (D/N)
Scorecard

Central Stags; 1995/5 (20 overs)	v	Northern Brave; 131 (18.1 overs)
Tom Bruce 64* (31); Rohit Gulati 3/20 (4 overs)		Jeet Raval 31 (24); Jayden Lennox 3/14 (4 overs)

Central Stags won by 64 runs
Saxton Oval, Nelson
Umpires: Wayne Knights and Greg Pennell
Player of the match: Tom Bruce (Central Stags)

- Central Stags won the toss and elected to bat.
- Rohit Gulati (Northern Brave) made his T20 debut.

Match 9
7 January 2025
14:10
Scorecard

Canterbury Kings; 169/7 (20 overs)	v	Otago Volts; 170/5 (18.4 overs)
Matthew Boyle 81* (51); Andrew Hazeldine 3/40 (4 overs)		Dean Foxcroft 60* (38); Ish Sodhi 2/24 (3 overs)

Otago Volts won by 5 wickets
Hagley Oval, Christchurch
Umpires: Chris Brown and Glen Walklin
Player of the match: Dean Foxcroft (Otago Volts)

- Otago Volts won the toss and elected to field.
- Rhys Mariu (Canterbury Kings) made his T20 debut.

Match 10
9 January 2025
16:25 (D/N)
Scorecard

Wellington Firebirds; 192/4 (20 overs)	v	Central Stags; 196/4 (20 overs)
Tim Robinson 89 (57); Brett Randell 2/30 (4 overs)		Jack Boyle 77 (43); Ben Sears 2/39 (4 overs)

Central Stags won by 6 wickets
Basin Reserve, Wellington
Umpires: Billy Bowden and Vinit Mahna
Player of the match: Jack Boyle (Central Stags)

- Wellington Firebirds won the toss and elected to bat.
- Toby Findlay (Central Stags) made his T20 debut.

Match 11
10 January 2025
17:55 (D/N)
Scorecard

Canterbury Kings; 173/9 (20 overs)	v	Auckland Aces; 132/9 (20 overs)
Chad Bowes 59 (31); Danru Ferns 3/27 (4 overs)		Michael Sclanders 23 (22); Zakary Foulkes 3/27 (4 overs)

Canterbury Kings won by 41 runs
Hagley Oval, Christchurch
Umpires: Chris Brown and John Dempsey
Player of the match: Chad Bowes (Canterbury Kings)

- Canterbury Kings won the toss and elected to bat.
- Lachlan Stackpole (Auckland Aces) made his T20 debut.

Match 12
12 January 2025
16:25 (D/N)
Scorecard

Central Stags; 133/6 (20 overs)	v	Otago Volts; 134/2 (9.4 overs)
Tom Bruce 44 (28); Luke Georgeson 2/24 (4 overs)		Jamal Todd 51* (28); Blair Tickner 2/34 (2 overs)

Otago Volts won by 8 wickets
Fitzherbert Park, Palmerston North
Umpires: Kannan Jagannathan and Greg Pennell
Player of the match: Jamal Todd (Otago Volts)

- Otago Volts won the toss and elected to field.

Match 13
13 January 2025
16:25 (D/N)
Scorecard

Auckland Aces; 187/5 (20 overs)	v	Northern Brave; 193/5 (19.1 overs)
Bevon Jacobs 90* (56); Neil Wagner 2/20 (4 overs)		Katene Clarke 90 (57); Jock McKenzie 3/33 (4 overs)

Northern Brave won by 5 wickets
Seddon Park, Hamilton
Umpires: Billy Bowden and Wayne Knights
Player of the match: Katene Clarke and Robert O'Donnell (Northern Brave)

- Auckland Aces won the toss and elected to bat.

Match 14
14 January 2025
16:25 (D/N)
Scorecard

Otago Volts; 164/7 (20 overs)	v	Wellington Firebirds; 149 (18.4 overs)
Dale Phillips 43 (25); Peter Younghusband 2/22 (4 overs)		Michael Bracewell 61 (31); Jacob Duffy 3/25 (3.4 overs)

Otago Volts won by 15 runs
Basin Reserve, Wellington
Umpires: Cory Black and Damian Morrow
Player of the match: Matthew Bacon (Otago Volts)

- Wellington Firebirds won the toss and elected to field.

Match 15
15 January 2025
16:25 (D/N)
Scorecard

Auckland Aces; 139/8 (20 overs)	v	Central Stags; 142/2 (17.2 overs)
William O'Donnell 32 (32); Jayden Lennox 3/10 (4 overs)		Jack Boyle 82* (60); Angus Olliver 1/19 (3.2 overs)

Central Stags won by 8 wickets
McLean Park, Napier
Umpires: Chris Brown and Tyron Davies
Player of the match: Jayden Lennox (Central Stags)

- Central Stags won the toss and elected to field.
- Angus Olliver (Auckland Aces) made his T20 debut.

Match 16
16 January 2025
16:25 (D/N)
Scorecard

Northern Brave; 212/2 (20 overs)	v	Otago Volts; 208/8 (20 overs)
Katene Clarke 106 (65)		Leo Carter 54 (35); Neil Wagner 2/31 (4 overs)

Northern Brave won by 8 runs
University of Otago Oval, Dunedin
Umpires: Shaun Haig and Pete Pasco
Player of the match: Katene Clarke (Northern Brave)

- Otago Volts won the toss and elected to field.
- Katene Clarke (Northern Brave) scored his maiden century in T20s.

Match 17
17 January 2025
17:55 (D/N)
Scorecard

Central Stags; 190/4 (20 overs)	v	Canterbury Kings; 175/8 (20 overs)
Curtis Heaphy 78 (57); Zakary Foulkes 2/38 (4 overs)		Michael Rippon 38 (22); Blair Tickner 4/23 (3 overs)

Central Stags won by 15 runs
McLean Park, Napier
Umpires: Cory Black and Glen Walkin
Player of the match: Curtis Heaphy (Central Stags)

- Canterbury Kings won the toss and elected to field.

Match 18
18 January 2025
14:25
Scorecard

Wellington Firebirds; 186/3 (20 overs)	v	Otago Volts; 153 (18.5 overs)
Tim Robinson 76* (58); Ben Lockrose 1/27 (4 overs)		Glenn Phillips 49 (32); Ben Sears 4/29 (4 overs)

Wellington Firebirds won by 33 runs
University of Otago Oval, Dunedin
Umpires: Chris Brown and Neil Louw
Player of the match: Ben Sears (Wellington Firebirds)

- Wellington Firebirds won the toss and elected to bat.

Match 19
19 January 2025
16:25 (D/N)
Scorecard

Canterbury Kings; 165/9 (20 overs)	v	Northern Brave; 142/8 (20 overs)
Matthew Boyle 49 (26); Freddy Walker 2/18 (4 overs)		Katene Clarke 31 (34); William O'Rourke 3/26 (4 overs)

Canterbury Kings won by 23 runs
Seddon Park, Hamilton
Umpires: Greg Pennell and SB Martin
Player of the match: Ish Sodhi (Canterbury Kings)

- Canterbury Kings won the toss and elected to bat.

Match 20
20 January 2025
16:25 (D/N)
Scorecard

Auckland Aces; 215/3 (20 overs)	v	Wellington Firebirds; 162 (17.2 overs)
Martin Guptill 82 (49); Michael Snedden 2/39 (4 overs)		Muhammad Abbas 57 (26); Danru Ferns 4/16 (3 overs)

Auckland Aces won by 53 runs
Basin Reserve, Wellington
Umpires: Shaun Haig and Craig Pryor
Player of the match: Simon Keene (Auckland Aces)

- Wellington Firebirds won the toss and elected to field.

Match 21
21 January 2025
17:55 (D/N)
Scorecard

Northern Brave	v	Central Stags

Match abandoned
Seddon Park, Hamilton
Umpires: Cory Black and SB Martin

- No toss.
- No play was possible due to rain.

Match 22
22 January 2025
16:25 (D/N)
Scorecard

Canterbury Kings; 164/7 (20 overs)	v	Wellington Firebirds; 153/8 (20 overs)
Cole McConchie 51 (39); Michael Bracewell 1/20 (3 overs)		Nick Kelly 40 (39); Matt Henry 3/21 (4 overs)

Canterbury Kings won by 11 runs
Basin Reserve, Wellington
Umpires: Shaun Haig and Kannan Jagannathan
Player of the match: Matt Henry (Canterbury Kings)

- Canterbury Kings won the toss and elected to bat.

Match 23
23 January 2025
16:25 (D/N)
Scorecard

Auckland Aces; 197/6 (20 overs)	v	Otago Volts; 128 (16.2 overs)
Mark Chapman 68 (40); Andrew Hazeldine 2/19 (4 overs)		Dale Phillips 40 (25); Adithya Ashok 3/22 (4 overs)

Auckland Aces won by 69 runs
Eden Park, Auckland
Umpires: Chris Brown and Craig Pryor
Player of the match: Adithya Ashok (Auckland Aces)

- Auckland Aces won the toss and elected to bat.

Match 24
24 January 2025
17:55 (D/N)
Scorecard

Wellington Firebirds; 167 (20 overs)	v	Canterbury Kings; 136 (18.5 overs)
Jesse Tashkoff 52 (40); Matt Henry 5/18 (4 overs)		Tom Latham 26 (23); Michael Bracewell 4/31 (4 overs)

Wellington Firebirds won by 31 runs
Hagley Oval, Christchurch
Umpires: Shaun Haig and Pete Pasco
Player of the match: Michael Bracewell (Wellington Firebirds)

- Canterbury Kings won the toss and elected to field.
- Matt Henry (Canterbury Kings) took his first five-wicket haul in T20s.

Match 25
25 January 2025
17:55 (D/N)
Scorecard

Otago Volts; 143/7 (20 overs)	v	Northern Brave; 146/6 (17.3 overs)
Jamal Todd 75 (55); Kristian Clarke 2/22 (3 overs)		Robert O'Donnell 39 (32); Jacob Duffy 2/19 (4 overs)

Northern Brave won by 4 wickets
Bay Oval, Mount Maunganui
Umpires: Kannan Jagannathan (NZ) and Jonathan Kennedy (Ire)
Player of the match: Robert O'Donnell (Northern Brave)

- Northern Brave won the toss and elected to field.

Match 26
26 January 2025
16:25 (D/N)
Scorecard

Canterbury Kings; 45/6 (11 overs)	v	Central Stags
Curtis Heaphy 12 (18); Kyle Jamieson 4/12 (4 overs)

No result
Hagley Oval, Christchurch
Umpires: Cory Black and Pete Pasco

- Canterbury Kings won the toss and elected to field.
- Rain prevented any further play.

Match 27
27 January 2025
12:40
Scorecard

Auckland Aces; 150/6 (20 overs)	v	Wellington Firebirds; 152/4 (19.2 overs)
Bevon Jacobs 37 (32); Rachin Ravindra 2/23 (4 overs)		Rachin Ravindra 48 (38); Angus Olliver 3/28 (4 overs)

Wellington Firebirds won by 6 wickets
Eden Park, Auckland
Umpires: Jonathan Kennedy (Ire) and Greg Pennell (NZ)
Player of the match: Rachin Ravindra (Wellington Firebirds)

- Auckland Aces won the toss and elected to bat.

Match 28
28 January 2025
17:55 (D/N)
Scorecard

Canterbury Kings; 175/7 (20 overs)	v	Northern Brave; 119/9 (20 overs)
Daryl Mitchell 67 (44); Kris Clarke 2/20 (3 overs)		Jeet Raval 20 (12); Cole McConchie 4/31 (4 overs)

Canterbury Kings won by 56 runs
Hagley Oval, Christchurch
Umpires: Billy Bowden and Brad Wilson
Player of the match: Matt Boyle (Canterbury Kings)

- Canterbury Kings won the toss and elected to bat.

Match 29
29 January 2025
17:55 (D/N)
Scorecard

Auckland Aces; 147/9 (18 overs)	v	Central Stags; 149/5 (17.3 overs)
Cam Fletcher 31 (25); Brett Randell 3/25 (4 overs)		Tom Bruce 37 (31); Jock McKenzie 2/33 (4 overs)

Central Stags won by 5 wickets (DLS method)
McLean Park, Napier
Umpires: John Dempsey and Greg Pennell
Player of the match: Tom Bruce (Central Stags)

- Central Stags won the toss and elected to field.
- The match was reduced to 18 overs per side due to rain.

Match 30
30 January 2025
16:25 (D/N)
Scorecard

Wellington Firebirds	v	Northern Brave

Match abandoned
Basin Reserve, Wellington
Umpires: Shaun Haig (NZ) and Jonathan Kennedy (Ire)

- No toss.
- No play was possible due to rain.

== Finals ==
Elimination Final			Grand Final
			1	Central Stags	136/4 (17.2 overs)
2	Northern Brave	110/9 (20 overs)	EW	Canterbury Kings	135/8 (20 overs)
3	Canterbury Kings	111/3 (13.1 overs)

=== Elimination Final ===
Elimination Final
1 February 2025
16:25 (D/N)
Scorecard

Northern Brave; 110/9 (20 overs)	v	Canterbury Kings; 111/3 (13.1 overs)
Jeet Raval 45 (39); Henry Shipley 3/17 (3 overs)		Matt Boyle 48 (25); Fergus Lellman 2/13 (2.3 overs)

Canterbury Kings won by 7 wickets
Basin Reserve, Wellington
Umpires: John Dempsey and Pete Pasco
Player of the match: Matt Henry (Canterbury Kings)

- Canterbury Kings won the toss and elected to field.

=== Grand Final ===
Grand Final
2 February 2025
16:25 (D/N)
Scorecard

Canterbury Kings; 135/8 (20 overs)	v	Central Stags; 136/4 (17.2 overs)
Daryl Mitchell 46 (38); Toby Findlay 3/29 (4 overs)		Dane Cleaver 43 (34); Kyle Jamieson 2/24 (4 overs)

Central Stags won by 6 wickets
Basin Reserve, Wellington
Umpires: Cory Black and Shaun Haig
Player of the match: Dane Cleaver (Central Stags)

- Central Stags won the toss and elected to field.

== Season statistics ==
Highest team total
Score (overs)	Team	Opponent	Result	Venue	Date
215/3 (20.0)	Auckland Aces	Wellington Firebirds	Won	Basin Reserve, Wellington	20 January 2025
212/2 (20.0)	Northern Brave	Otago Volts	Won	University of Otago Oval, Dunedin	16 January 2025
204/8 (20.0)	Otago Volts	Northern Brave	Lost	University of Otago Oval, Dunedin	16 January 2025
197/6 (20.0)	Auckland Aces	Otago Volts	Won	Eden Park, Auckland	23 January 2025
196/4 (20.0)	Central Stags	Wellington Firebirds	Won	Basin Reserve, Wellington	9 January 2025

- Source: ESPNCricinfo

Lowest team totals (completed innings)
Score (overs)	Team	Opponent	Venue	Date
106 (16.1)	Auckland Aces	Otago Volts	Molyneux Park, Alexandra	29 December 2024
110/9 (20.0)	Northern Brave	Canterbury Kings	Basin Reserve, Wellington	1 February 2025
119/9 (20.0)	Northern Brave	Canterbury Kings	Hagley Oval, Christchurch	28 January 2025
128 (16.2)	Otago Volts	Auckland Aces	Eden Park, Auckland	23 January 2025
131 (18.1)	Northern Brave	Central Stags	Saxton Oval, Nelson	6 January 2025

- Source: ESPNCricinfo

Most individual runs
Runs	Player	Team
377	Matt Boyle	Canterbury Kings
339	Tom Bruce	Central Stags
285	Jack Boyle	Central Stags
282	Katene Clarke	Northern Brave
263	Bevon Jacobs	Auckland Aces

- Source: ESPNcricinfo

Highest individual score
Runs	Batsmen	Team	Opposition
106	Katene Clarke	Northern Brave	Otago Volts
90*	Bevon Jacobs	Auckland Aces	Northern Brave
90	Katene Clarke	Northern Brave	Auckland Aces
89	Tim Robinson	Wellington Firebirds	Central Stags
83	Joe Carter	Northern Brave	Auckland Aces

- Source: ESPNcricinfo

Most wickets
Wickets	Player	Team
16	Blair Tickner	Central Stags
14	Danru Ferns	Auckland Aces
14	Kyle Jamieson	Canterbury Kings
13	Zakary Foulkes	Canterbury Kings
13	Andrew Hazeldine	Otago Volts
13	Jock McKenzie	Auckland Aces

- Source: ESPNcricinfo

Best individual bowling figures
BBI	Player	Team	Opposition
5/18	Matt Henry	Canterbury Kings	Wellington Firebirds
5/19	Henry Shipley	Canterbury Kings	Auckland Aces
5/24	James Hartshorn	Wellington Firebirds	Central Stags
4/12	Kyle Jamieson	Canterbury Kings	Central Stags
4/16	Danru Ferns	Auckland Aces	Wellington Firebirds

- Source: ESPNcricinfo
