= 2024–25 Ford Trophy =

Cricket tournament

- Dates: 20 October 2024 – 2 March 2025
- Administrator: New Zealand Cricket
- Cricket format: List A cricket
- Tournament format(s): Round-robin and Knockout
- Champions: Canterbury (17th title)
- Participants: 6
- Matches: 32
- Most runs: Curtis Heaphy (502)
- Most wickets: Matthew Bacon (21)
- Official website: Ford Trophy

The 2024–25 Ford Trophy was the 54rd season of The Ford Trophy, the List A cricket tournament that played in New Zealand. It was the twelfth in a sponsorship deal between New Zealand Cricket and Ford Motor Company. The tournament began from 20 October 2024 and ended on 2 March 2025. Canterbury were the defending champions.

Canterbury defend their title by defeating Auckland in the final.

== Points table ==
Pos	Team	Pld	W	L	T	NR	Pts	NRR	Qualification
1	Canterbury	10	7	2	0	1	33	0.804	Advance to Grand Final
2	Auckland	10	6	4	0	0	27	0.479	Advance to Elimination Final
3	Central Districts	10	5	4	0	1	25	0.182	Advance to Elimination Final
4	Otago	10	5	5	0	0	23	0.156	
5	Wellington	10	4	5	0	1	19	−0.442	
6	Northern Districts	10	1	8	0	1	6	−1.195	

Source: ESPNcricinfo
- Points awarded as follows:
  - Won - 4, Lost - 0, Tied - 2, No Result - 2, Abandoned - 2, Bonus Point (Run Rate 1.25x Opponents') - 1

== Fixtures ==
=== Round 1 ===
20 October 2024
10:30
Scorecard

Otago; 316/9 (50 overs)	v	Northern Districts; 141 (38.4 overs)
Dale Phillips 89 (109); Scott Kuggeleijn 4/50 (10 overs)		Fergus Lellman 33 (43); Dean Foxcroft 3/36 (8.4 overs)

Otago won by 175 runs
Cobham Oval, Whangārei
Umpires: Chris Brown and Wayne Knights

- Northern Districts won the toss and elected to field.
- Fergus Lellman (Northern Districts) made his List A debut.
- Points: Otago 5, Northern Districts 0

20 October 2024
10:30
Scorecard

Auckland; 244/6 (50 overs)	v	Central Districts; 205 (45.2 overs)
William O'Donnell 115 (132); Blair Tickner 4/66 (10 overs)		Tom Bruce 73 (65); James Neesham 4/32 (9 overs)

Auckland won by 39 runs
Pukekura Park, New Plymouth
Umpires: John Dempsey and Greg Pennell

- Central Districts won the toss and elected to field.
- Points: Auckland 4, Central Districts 0

20 October 2024
10:30
Scorecard

Wellington; 129 (40.2 overs)	v	Canterbury; 130/4 (22.3 overs)
Troy Johnson 30 (65); Angus McKenzie 5/14 (8.2 overs)		Chad Bowes 48* (49); Logan van Beek 2/24 (6 overs)

Canterbury won by 6 wickets
Basin Reserve, Wellington
Umpires: Cory Black and Kannan Jagannathan

- Canterbury won the toss and elected to field.
- Angus McKenzie (Canterbury) took his first five-wicket haul in List A cricket.
- Points: Canterbury 5, Wellington 0

=== Round 2 ===
23 October 2024
10:30
Scorecard

Auckland; 140 (43.1 overs)	v	Wellington; 141/6 (30.5 overs)
Michael Sclanders 35 (50); Liam Dudding 2/9 (6.1 overs)		Tim Robinson 72 (95); Lockie Ferguson 3/33 (8 overs)

Wellington won by 4 wickets
Bay Oval, Mount Maunganui
Umpires: Chris Brown and Greg Pennell

- Wellington won the toss and elected to field.
- Yahya Zeb (Wellington) made his List A debut.
- Points: Wellington 5, Auckland 0

23 October 2024
10:30
Scorecard

Northern Districts; 352/8 (44 overs)	v	Central Districts; 344/8 (44 overs)
Tim Seifert 102 (87); Blair Tickner 3/59 (9 overs)		Brad Schmulian 126 (101); Brett Hampton 2/57 (9 overs)

Northern Districts won by 8 runs
Pukekura Park, New Plymouth
Umpires: Wayne Knights and Vinit Mahna

- Northern Districts won the toss and elected to bat.
- The match was reduced to 44 overs per side due to rain.
- Points: Northern Districts 4, Central Districts 0

23 October 2024
10:30
Scorecard

Canterbury; 343/9 (50 overs)	v	Otago; 103 (24.5 overs)
Chad Bowes 205 (110); Matthew Bacon 5/50 (10 overs)		Luke Georgeson 34 (52); Michael Rippon 3/9 (2.5 overs)

Canterbury won by 240 runs
Hagley Oval, Christchurch
Umpires: Shaun Haig and Neil Louw

- Otago won the toss and elected to field.
- Chad Bowes (Canterbury) scored his first double centuries in List A cricket and became fastest to do so in 103 balls breaking the record previously held jointly by Travis Head and Narayan Jagadeesan.
- Points: Canterbury 5, Otago 0

=== Round 3 ===
26 October 2024
10:30
Scorecard

Otago; 283/9 (50 overs)	v	Auckland; 285/6 (49.1 overs)
Dale Phillips 72 (92); Danru Ferns 3/66 (9 overs)		Michael Sclanders 107 (112); Travis Muller 3/63 (10 overs)

Auckland won by 4 wickets
Bay Oval, Mount Maunganui
Umpires: Cory Black and Chris Brown

- Auckland won the toss and elected to field.
- Points: Auckland 4, Otago 0

26 October 2024
10:30
Scorecard

Central Districts; 93/2 (22.4 overs)	v	Wellington
Curtis Heaphy 41* (71); Logan van Beek 1/18 (4 overs)

No result
Basin Reserve, Auckland
Umpires: Tyron Davies and Shaun Haig

- Wellington won the toss and elected to field.
- No further play was possible due to rain.
- Points: Central Districts 2, Wellington 2

26 October 2024
10:30
Scorecard

Canterbury	v	Northern Districts

Match abandoned
Hagley Oval, Christchurch
Umpires: John Dempsey and Pete Pasco

- No toss.
- No play was possible due to rain.
- Points: Canterbury 2, Northern Districts 2

=== Round 4 ===
30 October 2024
10:30
Scorecard

Canterbury; 109 (30 overs)	v	Auckland; 108/3 (21.4 overs)
Zakary Foulkes 27 (60); Simon Keene 5/29 (7 overs)		Sean Solia 45 (52); Angus Mckenzie 1/22 (5 overs)

Auckland won by 7 wickets (DLS method)
Bay Oval, Mount Maunganui
Umpires: Billy Bowden and Neil Louw

- Auckland won the toss and elected to field.
- The match was reduced to 44 overs per side due to rain.
- Simon Keene (Auckland) took his first five-wicket haul in List A cricket.
- Auckland were set a revised targets of 107 runs from 44 overs due to rain.
- Points: Auckland 4, Canterbury 0

30 October 2024
10:30
Scorecard

Wellington; 248 (48.3 overs)	v	Northern Districts; 199 (37.3 overs)
Muhammad Abbas 79 (70); Neil Wagner 3/49 (10 overs)		Brett Hampton 53 (36); Peter Younghusband 5/42 (7.3 overs)

Wellington won by 49 runs
Seddon Park, Hamilton
Umpires: Chris Brown and Greg Pennell

- Northern Districts won the toss and elected to field.
- Points: Wellington 4, Northern Districts 0

30 October 2024
10:30
Scorecard

Central Districts; 330/7 (50 overs)	v	Otago; 222/9 (42.4 overs)
Curtis Heaphy 142 (145); Jake Gibson 3/67 (10 overs)		Thorn Parkes 59 (70); Jayden Lennox 3/67 (9.4 overs)

Central Districts won by 108 runs
University of Otago Oval, Dunedin
Umpires: Shaun Haig and Kannan Jagannathan

- Otago won the toss and elected to field.
- Points: Central Districts 4, Otago 0

=== Round 5 ===
3 November 2024
10:30
Scorecard

Northern Districts; 248 (46.3 overs)	v	Auckland; 252/5 (35.1 overs)
Henry Cooper 86 (108); James Neesham 3/29 (8.3 overs)		James Neesham 69 (54); Scott Kuggeleijn 3/67 (10 overs)

Auckland won by 5 wickets
Seddon Park, Hamilton
Umpires: Wayne Knights and Stu Martin

- Auckland won the toss and elected to field.
- Points: Auckland 5, Northern Districts 0

3 November 2024
10:30
Scorecard

Canterbury; 204 (49.1 overs)	v	Central Districts; 201/7 (50 overs)
Rhys Mariu 41 (63); Raymond Toole 4/29 (10 overs)		Curtis Heaphy 56 (85); Fraser Sheat 2/21 (10 overs)

Canterbury won by 3 runs
Rangiora Recreation Ground, Rangiora
Umpires: John Dempsey and Kannan Jagannathan

- Central Districts won the toss and elected to field.
- Matt Rowe (Canterbury) made his List A debut.
- Points: Canterbury 4, Central Districts 0

3 November 2024
10:30
Scorecard

Otago; 273 (49.3 overs)	v	Wellington; 159 (39.4 overs)
Llew Johnson 78 (59); Nick Greenwood 4/28 (7 overs)		Logan van Beek 65 (76); Luke Georgeson 4/38 (10 overs)

Otago won by 114 runs
University of Otago Oval, Dunedin
Umpires: Shaun Haig and Peter Pasco

- Otago won the toss and elected to bat.
- Toby Hart (Otago) made his List A debut.
- Points: Otago 5, Wellington 0

=== Round 6 ===
6 February 2025
10:30
Scorecard

Auckland; 285 (50 overs)	v	Central Districts; 286/4 (48 overs)
Cam Fletcher 80 (76); Brett Randell 5/57 (10 overs)		Tom Bruce 139 (124); Jock McKenzie 2/46 (9 overs)

Central Districts won by 6 wickets
Eden Park, Auckland
Umpires: Billy Bowden and Craig Pryor

- Auckland won the toss and elected bat.
- Harjot Johal, Lachlan Stackpole and Quinn Sunde (Auckland) all made their List A debuts.
- Points: Central Districts 4, Auckland 0

6 February 2025
10:30
Scorecard

Northern Districts; 200 (43.4 overs)	v	Wellington; 201/6 (46 overs)
Joe Carter 49 (57); Peter Younghusband 3/42 (6.4 overs)		Muhammad Abbas 59* (68); Henry Cooper 2/21 (10 overs)

Wellington won by 4 wickets
Basin Reserve, Auckland
Umpires: John Dempsey and Neil Louw

- Northern Districts won the toss and elected to bat.
- Points: Wellington 4, Northern Districts 0

6 February 2025
10:30
Scorecard

Canterbury; 322/7 (50 overs)	v	Otago; 321/7 (50 overs)
Scott Janett 115 (115); Matthew Bacon 4/60 (9 overs)		Llew Johnson 115 (118); Fraser Sheat 3/49 (9 overs)

Canterbury won by 1 run
University of Otago Oval, Dunedin
Umpires: Wayne Knights and Greg Pennell

- Otago won the toss and elected to field.
- Mason Clarke, Jamal Todd (Otago) and Scott Janett (Canterbury) all made their List A debuts.
- Scott Janett (Canterbury) scored his first century in List A cricket.
- Points: Canterbury 4, Otago 0

=== Round 7 ===
10 February 2025
10:30
Scorecard

Northern Districts; 210 (49.5 overs)	v	Central Districts; 212/4 (40 overs)
Ben Pomare 63 (70); Brett Randell 5/37 (9.5 overs)		Brad Schmulian 74* (104); Brett Hampton 1/16 (6 overs)

Central Districts won by 6 wickets
Cobham Oval, Whangārei
Umpires: Billy Bowden and Brad Wilson

- Northern Districts won the toss and elected to bat.
- Rohit Gulati (Northern Districts) made his List A debut.
- Points: Central Districts 5, Northern Districts 0

10 February 2025
10:30
Scorecard

Canterbury; 321/5 (50 overs)	v	Wellington; 242 (49.3 overs)
Matthew Boyle 131 (124); Liam Dudding 3/57 (9 overs)		Nick Kelly 118 (99); Fraser Sheat 2/39 (9 overs)

Canterbury won by 79 runs
Hagley Oval, Christchurch
Umpires: Cory Black and Craig Pryor

- Wellington won the toss and elected to field.
- Matthew Boyle and Cole McConchie (Canterbury) both scored their first centuries in List A cricket.
- Points: Canterbury 5, Wellington 0

10 February 2025
10:30
Scorecard

Otago; 268 (49.2 overs)	v	Auckland; 271/7 (49.5 overs)
Dean Foxcroft 100 (105); Danru Ferns 4/45 (8.2 overs)		Sean Solia 55 (61); Jake Gibson 2/48 (6.5 overs)

Auckland won by 3 wickets
University of Otago Oval, Dunedin
Umpires: Kim Cotton and John Dempsey

- Otago won the toss and elected to bat.
- Points: Auckland 4, Otago 0

=== Round 8 ===
14 February 2025
10:30
Scorecard

Auckland; 230 (48.4 overs)	v	Northern Districts; 159 (42.2 overs)
Cam Fletcher 66 (118); Brett Hampton 3/46 (9 overs)		Brett Hampton 61 (54); Angus Olliver 2/26 (6 overs)

Auckland won by 71 runs
Eden Park, Auckland
Umpires: Wayne Knights and Neil Louw

- Northern Districts won the toss and elected to field.
- Points: Auckland 5, Northern Districts 0

14 February 2025
10:30
Scorecard

Canterbury; 176 (47.3 overs)	v	Central Districts; 180/3 (39.3 overs)
Cole McConchie 67 (97); Raymond Toole 3/7 (8.3 overs)		Jack Boyle 88* (98); Ish Sodhi 1/24 (5 overs)

Central Districts won by 7 wickets
Rangiora Recreation Ground, Rangiora
Umpires: Shaun Haig and Greg Pennell

- Central Districts won the toss and elected to field.
- Toby Findlay (Central Districts) made his List A debut.
- Points: Central Districts 5, Canterbury 0

14 February 2025
10:30
Scorecard

Otago; 349/8 (50 overs)	v	Wellington; 331 (49.2 overs)
Max Chu 97* (67); Logan van Beek 4/85 (10 overs)		Jesse Tashkoff 148 (125); Andrew Hazeldine 4/48 (10 overs)

Otago won by 18 runs
Basin Reserve, Auckland
Umpires: Cory Black and John Dempsey

- Wellington won the toss and elected to field.
- Jesse Tashkoff (Wellington) scored his first century in List A cricket.
- Points: Otago 4, Wellington 0

=== Round 9 ===
18 February 2025
10:30
Scorecard

Northern Districts; 262/5 (39 overs)	v	Canterbury; 263/7 (37.1 overs)
Tim Seifert 109* (71); Henry Shipley 3/43 (7 overs)		Rhys Mariu 87 (83); Brett Hampton 3/41 (7 overs)

Canterbury won by 3 wickets
Seddon Park, Hamilton
Umpires: Wayne Knights and Greg Pennell

- Canterbury won the toss and elected to field.
- The match was reduced to 39 overs per side due to rain.
- Points: Canterbury 4, Northern Districts 0

18 February 2025
10:30
Scorecard

Central Districts; 162 (45.4 overs)	v	Otago; 164/5 (29.5 overs)
Brad Schmulian 78 (117); Matthew Bacon 3/24 (7.4 overs)		Dale Phillips 58 (59); Raymond Toole 2/30 (7.5 overs)

Otago won by 5 wickets
McLean Park, Napier
Umpires: John Dempsey and Stu Martin

- Otago won the toss and elected to field.
- Points: Otago 5, Central Districts 0

18 February 2025
10:30
Scorecard

Auckland; 194/6 (31 overs)	v	Wellington; 198/3 (30.5 overs)
Jock McKenzie 50 (66); Muhammad Abbas 3/34 (6 overs)		Jesse Tashkoff 84* (86); Ben Lister 1/31 (5 overs)

Wellington won by 7 wickets
Basin Reserve, Auckland
Umpires: Cory Black and Chris Brown

- Wellington won the toss and elected to field.
- The match was reduced to 31 overs per side due to rain.
- Points: Wellington 4, Auckland 0

=== Round 10 ===
23 February 2025
10:30
Scorecard

Central Districts; 253 (48.3 overs)	v	Wellington; 251 (41.2 overs)
Tom Bruce 73 (54); Liam Dudding 3/55 (9 overs)		Muhammad Abbas 104 (120; Jayden Lennox 4/52 (9.2 overs)

Central Districts won by 2 runs
Pukekura Park, New Plymouth
Umpires: Cory Black and Wayne Knights

- Wellington won the toss and elected to field.
- Muhammad Abbas (Wellington) scored his first century in List A cricket.
- Points: Central Districts 4, Wellington 0

23 February 2025
10:30
Scorecard

Canterbury; 207/6 (24 overs)	v	Auckland; 206/4 (24 overs)
Rhys Mariu 63 (41); Nikith Perera 2/26 (3 overs)		Finn Allen 48 (32); Michael Rippon 1/7 (1 over)

Canterbury won by 1 run
Rangiora Recreation Ground, Rangiora
Umpires: Chris Brown and Greg Pennell

- Auckland won the toss and elected to field.
- The match was reduced to 24 overs per side due to rain.
- Points: Canterbury 4, Auckland 0

23 February 2025
10:30
Scorecard

Northern Districts; 226/6 (31 overs)	v	Otago; 232/3 (29.3 overs)
Brett Hampton 56* (30); Matthew Bacon 2/59 (7 overs)		Llew Johnson 85* (62); Matthew Fisher 2/49 (7 overs)

Otago won by 7 wickets
Queens Park, Invercargill
Umpires: Billy Bowden and Peter Pasco

- Otago won the toss and elected to field.
- The match was reduced to 31 overs per side due to rain.
- Points: Otago 4, Northern Districts 0

== Finals ==
Elimination Final			Grand Final
			1	Canterbury	254/4 (46 overs)
2	Auckland	327/9 (50 overs)	2	Auckland	250 (50 overs)
3	Central Districts	236 (43.3 overs)

=== Elimination Final ===
28 February 2025
10:30
Scorecard

Auckland; 327/9 (50 overs)	v	Central Districts; 236 (43.3 overs)
James Neesham 128 (82); Brett Randell 4/49 (10 overs)		Curtis Heaphy 69* (65); James Neesham 3/53 (8 overs)

Auckland won by 91 runs
University of Otago Oval, Dunedin
Umpires: Cory Black and Shaun Haig

- Central Districts won the toss and elected to field.

=== Grand Final ===
2 March 2025
10:30
Scorecard

Auckland; 250 (50 overs)	v	Canterbury; 254/4 (46 overs)
Lachlan Stackpole 58* (64); Zak Foulkes 3/40 (10 overs)		Mitchell Hay 86* (76); James Neesham 1/26 (3 overs)

Canterbury won by 6 wickets
University of Otago Oval, Dunedin
Umpires: Chris Brown and Wayne Knights

- Auckland won the toss and elected to bat.
