= 2025–26 Ford Trophy =

Cricket tournament

- Dates: 25 October 2025 – 22 February 2026
- Administrator: New Zealand Cricket
- Cricket format: List A cricket
- Tournament format(s): Double round-robin and Knockout
- Champions: Central Districts (8th title)
- Participants: 6
- Matches: 32
- Most runs: Henry Nicholls (588)
- Most wickets: Josh Clarkson (23)
- Official website: Ford Trophy

The 2025–26 Ford Trophy was the 55th season of Ford Trophy, the List A cricket tournament that is scheduled to be played in New Zealand. It was the thirteenth in a sponsorship deal between New Zealand Cricket and Ford Motor Company. The tournament was held from 25 October 2025 to 22 February 2026.

Canterbury were the defending champions.

== Teams and standings ==
=== Points table ===
Pos	Team	Pld	W	L	T	NR	Pts	NRR	Qualification
1	Canterbury	10	7	2	0	1	35	1.408	Advance to Grand Final
2	Central Districts	10	6	3	0	1	29	0.183	Advance to Elimination Final
3	Wellington	10	6	4	0	0	26	−0.114	Advance to Elimination Final
4	Auckland	10	4	5	0	1	21	0.163	
5	Northern Districts	10	3	5	0	2	19	0.207	
6	Otago	10	0	7	0	3	6	−1.534	

Source: ESPNcricinfo, NZC
- Points awarded as follows:
  - Won - 4, Lost - 0, Tied - 2, No Result - 2, Abandoned - 2, Bonus Point (Run Rate 1.25x Opponents') - 1

=== Points summary ===
Team	Group matches										Play-offs	
Team	1	2	3	4	5	6	7	8	9	10	EF	F
Auckland	5	10	10	10	14	14	14	14	16	21		
Canterbury	5	5	9	14	18	23	28	30	35	35	→	L
Central Districts	5	5	9	14	14	18	23	23	25	29	W	W
Northern Districts	0	5	5	5	7	12	12	17	19	19		
Otago	0	0	0	0	2	2	2	4	6	6		
Wellington	0	4	8	12	12	12	17	21	21	26	L	

Win	Loss	Tie	No result	Eliminated

- Note: The total points at the end of each group match are listed.
- Note: Click on the points or results to see the match summary.

== Fixtures ==
=== Round 1 ===
25 October 2025
10:30
Scorecard

Northern Districts; 168 (46.4 overs)	v	Auckland; 169/4 (28.5 overs)
Joe Carter 53 (83); Jock McKenzie 3/36 (8 overs)		Bevon Jacobs 67* (45); Scott Kuggeleijn 2/31 (6 overs)

Auckland won by 6 wickets
Eden Park Outer Oval, Auckland
Umpires: Billy Bowden and Vinit Mahna

- Auckland won the toss and elected to field.
- Siddhesh Dixit, Harrish Kannan (Auckland) and Xavier Bell (Northern Districts) all made their List A debuts.
- Points: Auckland 5, Northern Districts 0

25 October 2025
10:30
Scorecard

Wellington; 199 (40.5 overs)	v	Central Districts; 201/6 (39.2 overs)
Gareth Severin 60 (68); Josh Clarkson 5/32 (10 overs)		Brad Schmulian 60 (96); Peter Younghusband 2/37 (8 overs)

Central Districts won by 4 wickets
Pukekura Park, New Plymouth
Umpires: John Dempsey and Craig Pryor

- Central Districts won the toss and elected to field.
- Josh Clarkson (Central Districts) took his first five-wicket haul in List A cricket.
- Points: Central Districts 5, Wellington 0

25 October 2025
10:30
Scorecard

Otago; 206 (48.5 overs)	v	Canterbury; 207/4 (38.5 overs)
Jack Boyle 64 (77); Michael Rippon 3/28 (9 overs)		Henry Nicholls 117* (125); Matthew Bacon 1/34 (5 overs)

Canterbury won by 6 wickets
Hagley Oval, Christchurch
Umpires: Kannan Jagannathan and Greg Pennell

- Otago won the toss and elected to bat.
- Points: Canterbury 5, Otago 0

=== Round 2 ===
30 October 2025
10:30
Scorecard

Auckland; 232 (47.5 overs)	v	Otago; 137 (31 overs)
Cam Fletcher 46 (64); Ben Lockrose 3/33 (8.5 overs)		Llew Johnson 31 (29); Adithya Ashok 4/43 (7 overs)

Auckland won by 95 runs
Eden Park Outer Oval, Auckland
Umpires: John Dempsey and Brad Wilson

- Otago won the toss and elected to field.
- Points: Auckland 5, Otago 0

30 October 2025
10:30
Scorecard

Northern Districts; 271/8 (49 overs)	v	Central Districts; 156 (42.4 overs)
Kris Clarke 100* (107); Josh Clarkson 4/42 (10 overs)		Curtis Heaphy 58* (97); Zak Gibson 3/10 (7 overs)

Northern Districts won by 113 runs (DLS method)
Pukekura Park, New Plymouth
Umpires: Billy Bowden and Greg Pennell

- Central Districts won the toss and elected to field.
- The match was reduced to 49 overs per side due to rain.
- Central Districts were set a revised target of 270 runs from 49 overs.
- Kris Clarke (Northern Districts) scored his maiden century in List A cricket.
- Points: Northern Districts 5, Central Districts 0

30 October 2025
10:30
Scorecard

Canterbury; 258 (49.5 overs)	v	Wellington; 259/8 (49 overs)
Matt Boyle 73 (78); James Hartshorn 3/57 (9.5 overs)		Peter Younghusband 83 (97); Angus McKenzie 3/38 (10 overs)

Wellington won by 2 wickets
Basin Reserve, Wellington
Umpires: Kannan Jagannathan and Peter Pasco

- Wellington won the toss and elected to field.
- Points: Wellington 4, Canterbury 0

=== Round 3 ===
3 November 2025
10:30
Scorecard

Northern Districts; 233 (46.3 overs)	v	Wellington; 234/7 (43.3 overs)
Brett Hampton 68 (61); Michael Snedden 3/51 (8.3 overs)		Tim Robinson 113 (118); Joshua Brow 3/35 (6.3 overs)

Wellington won by 3 wickets
Seddon Park, Hamilton
Umpires: Kannan Jagannathan and Damian Morrow

- Wellington won the toss and elected to field.
- Tim Robinson (Wellington) scored his maiden century in List A cricket.
- Points: Wellington 4, Northern Districts 0

3 November 2025
10:30
Scorecard

Canterbury; 337/8 (50 overs)	v	Auckland; 316/9 (50 overs)
Henry Nicholls 138 (124); Jock McKenzie 3/53 (7 overs)		Ryan Harrison 79 (47); Angus McKenzie 2/49 (10 overs)

Canterbury won by 21 runs
Hagley Oval, Christchurch
Umpires: Billy Bowden and Peter Pasco

- Auckland won the toss and elected to field.
- Points: Canterbury 4, Auckland 0

3 November 2025
10:30
Scorecard

Central Districts; 233/8 (50 overs)	v	Otago; 226 (48.1 overs)
Tom Bruce 72 (95); Jarrod McKay 3/39 (10 overs)		Troy Johnson 50 (40); Josh Clarkson 3/23 (10 overs)

Central Districts won by 7 runs
University of Otago Oval, Dunedin
Umpires: Greg Pennell and Niel Louw

- Otago won the toss and elected to field.
- Points: Central Districts 4, Otago 0

=== Round 4 ===
8 November 2025
10:30
Scorecard

Central Districts; 337/5 (50 overs)	v	Auckland; 201 (41.3 overs)
Brad Schmulian 136* (147); Rohit Gulati 2/32 (10 overs)		Harrish Kannan 106 (122); Josh Clarkson 4/43 (10 overs)

Central Districts won by 136 runs
Eden Park Outer Oval, Auckland
Umpires: Vinit Mahna and Craig Pryor

- Central Districts won the toss and elected to bat.
- Jaskaran Sandhu (Auckland) made his List A debut.
- Harrish Kannan (Auckland) scored his maiden century in List A cricket.
- Points: Central Districts 5, Auckland 0

8 November 2025
10:30
Scorecard

Northern Districts; 210/8 (50 overs)	v	Canterbury; 211/4 (39.3 overs)
Robert O'Donnell 106 (122); Raunaq Kapur 3/30 (10 overs)		Rhys Mariu 67* (74); Tim Pringle 2/33 (10 overs)

Canterbury won by 6 wickets
Seddon Park, Hamilton
Umpires: Billy Bowden and John Dempsey

- Northern Districts won the toss and elected to bat.
- Snehith Reddy (Northern Districts) made his List A debut.
- Points: Canterbury 5, Northern Districts 0

8 November 2025
10:30
Scorecard

Otago; 227 (49.5 overs)	v	Wellington; 228/6 (46.2 overs)
Max Chu 57 (62); Peter Younghusband 3/39 (10 overs)		Tom Blundell 64* (84); Jarrod McKay 2/47 (10 overs)

Wellington won by 4 wickets
Basin Reserve, Wellington
Umpires: Tyron Davies and Glen Walklin

- Otago won the toss and elected to bat.
- Sam Mycock (Wellington) and Thomas O'Connor (Otago) both made their List A debuts.
- Points: Wellington 4, Otago 0

=== Round 5 ===
12 November 2025
10:30
Scorecard

Northern Districts; 209/5 (41.3 overs)	v	Otago
Robert O'Donnell 66 (78); Jack Boyle 2/29 (7 overs)

No result
Bay Oval, Mount Maunganui
Umpires: Stu Martin and Greg Pennell

- Otago won the toss and elected to field.
- No further play was possible due to rain.
- Aryan Mann (Northern Districts) made his List A debut.
- Points: Northern Districts 2, Otago 2

12 November 2025
10:30
Scorecard

Auckland; 286/9 (50 overs)	v	Wellington; 232/9 (50 overs)
Cam Fletcher 100 (102); Michael Snedden 3/66 (10 overs)		Tom Blundell 77 (87); Ryan Harrison 2/24 (6 overs)

Auckland won by 54 runs
Basin Reserve, Wellington
Umpires: Kannan Jagannathan and Brad Wilson

- Wellington won the toss and elected to field.
- Points: Auckland 4, Wellington 0

12 November 2025
10:30
Scorecard

Central Districts; 264/5 (50 overs)	v	Canterbury; 266/2 (43.4 overs)
Tom Bruce 102* (136); Fraser Sheat 3/46 (10 overs)		Chad Bowes 102 (97); Raymond Toole 1/48 (8 overs)

Canterbury won by 8 wickets
Rangiora Recreation Ground, Rangiora
Umpires: John Dempsey and Niel Louw

- Central Districts won the toss and elected to bat.
- Points: Canterbury 4, Central Districts 0

=== Round 6 ===
4 February 2026
10:30
Scorecard

Canterbury; 384/5 (50 overs)	v	Auckland; 124 (19.3 overs)
Henry Nicholls 122 (118); Harjot Johal 2/70 (10 overs)		Sean Solia 48 (52); Cole McConchie 4/15 (3 overs)

Canterbury won by 84 runs (DLS method)
Eden Park Outer Oval, Auckland
Umpires: John Dempsey and Vinit Mahna

- Auckland won the toss and elected to field.
- Auckland were set a revised target of 209 runs from 21 overs due to rain.
- Callum Cameron and LLB Harper (Canterbury) both made their List A debuts.
- Points: Canterbury 5, Auckland 0

4 February 2026
10:30
Scorecard

Central Districts; 307/4 (36 overs)	v	Wellington; 289/8 (36 overs)
Brad Schmulian 148* (98); Peter Younghusband 2/55 (7 overs)		Tim Robinson 100 (79); Angus Schaw 2/32 (5 overs)

Central Districts won by 18 runs
Basin Reserve, Wellington
Umpires: Tyron Davies and Greg Pennell

- Wellington won the toss and elected to field.
- The match was reduced to 36 overs per side due to rain.
- Oscar Jackson (Wellington) made his List A debut.
- Points: Central Districts 4, Wellington 0

4 February 2026
10:30
Scorecard

Otago; 148 (42.3 overs)	v	Northern Districts; 149/2 (20.4 overs)
Max Chu 78 (123); Scott Kuggeleijn 5/32 (10 overs)		Fergus Lellman 51* (54); Jarrod McKay 1/34 (5 overs)

Northern Districts won by 8 wickets
University of Otago Oval, Dunedin
Umpires: Kim Cotton and Kannan Jagannathan

- Northern Districts won the toss and elected to field.
- Zac Cumming (Otago) made his List A debut.
- Points: Northern Districts 5, Otago 0

=== Round 7 ===
7 February 2026
10:30
Scorecard

Auckland; 163 (50 overs)	v	Central Districts; 164/5 (39.5 overs)
Bevon Jacobs 47 (76); Brett Randell 3/24 (10 overs)		Dean Foxcroft 56 (79); Harjot Johal 2/18 (4 overs)

Central Districts won by 5 wickets
McLean Park, Napier
Umpires: John Dempsey and Glen Walklin

- Auckland won the toss and elected to bat.
- Points: Central Districts 5, Auckland 0

7 February 2026
10:30
Scorecard

Canterbury; 158 (42.5 overs)	v	Northern Districts; 162/2 (30.1 overs)
Henry Cooper 30 (49); Fraser Sheat 2/23 (8 overs)		Tom Latham 103* (97); Scott Kuggeleijn 1/34 (7 overs)

Canterbury won by 8 wickets
Rangiora Recreation Ground, Rangiora
Umpires: Billy Bowden and Regan Dalley

- Canterbury won the toss and elected to field.
- Cooper Rowell (Northern Districts) made his List A debut.
- Points: Canterbury 5, Northern Districts 0

7 February 2026
10:30
Scorecard

Wellington; 269/9 (50 overs)	v	Otago; 213 (45.5 overs)
Nick Kelly 81 (118); Matthew Bacon 3/43 (10 overs)		Luke Georgeson 52 (64); Liam Dudding 4/31 (6 overs)

Wellington won by 56 runs
University of Otago Oval, Dunedin
Umpires: Kannan Jagannathan and Greg Pennell

- Wellington won the toss and elected to bat.
- Points: Wellington 5, Otago 0

=== Round 8 ===
10 February 2026
10:30
Scorecard

Auckland; 240/8 (50 overs)	v	Wellington; 243/5 (43.5 overs)
Sean Solia 42 (62); Nick Greenwood 3/24 (10 overs)		Oscar Jackson 57 (27); Adithya Ashok 3/50 (10 overs)

Wellington won by 5 wickets
Eden Park Outer Oval, Auckland
Umpires: Billy Bowden and Craig Pryor

- Auckland won the toss and elected to bat.
- Points: Wellington 4, Auckland 0

10 February 2026
10:30
Scorecard

Northern Districts; 309/8 (50 overs)	v	Central Districts; 240 (43.3 overs)
Xavier Bell 66 (73); Brett Randell 2/49 (7 overs)		Dean Foxcroft 72 (56); Tim Pringle 4/29 (10 overs)

Northern Districts won by 69 runs
Seddon Park, Hamilton
Umpires: Kannan Jagannathan and Damian Morrow

- Central Districts won the toss and elected to field.
- Points: Northern Districts 5, Central Districts 0

10 February 2026
10:30
Scorecard

Otago	v	Canterbury

Match abandoned
Queen's Park, Invercargill
Umpires: Kim Cotton and Pete Pasco

- No toss.
- No play was possible due to rain.
- Points: Otago 2, Canterbury 2

=== Round 9 ===
13 February 2026
10:30
Scorecard

Northern Districts; 0/1 (0.2 overs)	v	Auckland
Simon Keene 1/0 (0.2 overs)

No result
Cobham Oval, Whangārei
Umpires: Billy Bowden and Brad Wilson

- Auckland won the toss and elected to field.
- The match was reduced to 41 overs per side due to rain.
- Rain prevented any further play.
- Points: Northern Districts 2, Auckland 2

13 February 2026
10:30
Scorecard

Otago; 8/0 (1.4 overs)	v	Central Districts
Jacob Cumming 6* (5)

No result
Saxton Oval, Nelson
Umpires: John Dempsey and Greg Pennell

- Central Districts won the toss and elected to field.
- Rain prevented any further play.
- Hugo Bogue (Otago) made his List A debut.
- Points: Central Districts 2, Otago 2

13 February 2026
10:30
Scorecard

Wellington; 68 (22.2 overs)	v	Canterbury; 69/2 (11.5 overs)
Tom Blundell 21 (17); Michael Rae 5/15 (5.2 overs)		Henry Nicholls 44* (38); Nathan Smith 2/27 (6 overs)

Canterbury won by 8 wickets
Hagley Oval, Christchurch
Umpires: Regan Dalley and Kannan Jagannathan

- Canterbury won the toss and elected to field.
- Points: Canterbury 5, Wellington 0

=== Round 10 ===
17 February 2026
10:30
Scorecard

Central Districts; 276/8 (50 overs)	v	Canterbury
Curtis Heaphy 117* (142); Michael Rae 3/51 (10 overs)		Raunaq Kapur 60* (69); Brett Randell 3/50 (10 overs)

Central Districts won by 22 runs
Saxton Oval, Nelson
Umpires: John Dempsey and Kannan Jagannathan

- Central Districts won the toss and elected to bat.
- Points: Central Districts 4, Canterbury 0

17 February 2026
10:30
Scorecard

Otago; 158 (43.3 overs)	v	Auckland; 161/4 (23.4 overs)
Jacob Cumming 49 (66); Rohit Gulati 3/22 (10 overs)		Dale Phillips 54 (54); Jarrod McKay 4/39 (7 overs)

Auckland won by 6 wickets
Queenstown Events Centre, Queenstown
Umpires: Billy Bowden and Greg Pennell

- Auckland won the toss and elected to field.
- Points: Auckland 5, Otago 0

18 February 2026
10:30
Scorecard

Wellington; 281/7 (50 overs)	v	Northern Districts; 163 (36.1 overs)
Nathan Smith 64* (47); Scott Kuggeleijn 3/69 (10 overs)		Xavier Bell 54 (58); Peter Younghusband 4/38 (9.1 overs)

Wellington won by 118 runs
Basin Reserve, Wellington
Umpires: Cory Black and Craig Pryor

- Northern Districts won the toss and elected to field.
- Points: Wellington 5, Northern Districts 0

== Finals ==
Elimination Final			Grand Final
			1	Canterbury	302/7 (50 overs)
2	Central Districts	349/5 (50 overs)	EF	Central Districts	303/4 (47.5 overs)
3	Wellington	138 (32.2 overs)

=== Elimination Final ===
Elimination Final
20 February 2026
10:30
Scorecard

Central Districts; 349/5 (50 overs)	v	Wellington; 138 (32.2 overs)
Will Young 105 (109); Nathan Smith 1/51 (10 overs)		Nathan Smith 30 (41); Brett Randell 3/30 (9 overs)

Central Districts won by 211 runs
Basin Reserve, Wellington
Umpires: John Dempsey and Kannan Jagannathan

- Wellington won the toss and elected to field.

=== Grand Final ===
Grand Final
22 February 2026
10:30
Scorecard

Canterbury; 302/7 (50 overs)	v	Central Districts; 303/4 (47.5 overs)
Henry Nicholls 115 (125); Josh Clarkson 2/44 (10 overs)		Will Young 157 (132); Fraser Sheat 2/38 (9 overs)

Central Districts won by 6 wickets
Basin Reserve, Wellington
Umpires: Cory Black and Billy Bowden

- Canterbury won the toss and elected to bat.
- Will Young (Central Districts) scored his 5,000th run in List A cricket.
