= 2024–25 Plunket Shield season =

Cricket tournament

2024–25 Plunket Shield
- Dates: 11 November 2024 – 1 April 2025
- Administrator: New Zealand Cricket
- Cricket format: First-class
- Tournament format: Round-robin
- Champions: Northern Districts (9th title)
- Participants: 6
- Matches: 24
- Most runs: Nick Kelly (749) (Wellington)
- Most wickets: Logan van Beek (36) (Wellington)

The 2024–25 Plunket Shield was the 99th season of the Plunket Shield, a domestic first-class cricket competition that was played in New Zealand. The tournament started on 11 November 2024, and concluded on 1 April 2025.

Northern Districts won the competition, after defeating Otago to claim first place on the points table.

== Points table ==
Pos	Team	Pld	W	L	D	Pts
1	Northern Districts (C)	8	5	0	3	109
2	Wellington	8	4	3	1	100
3	Canterbury	8	3	4	1	86
4	Central Districts	8	3	3	2	79
5	Otago	8	1	4	3	54
6	Auckland	8	1	3	4	51

Source: ESPNcricinfo
Rules for classification: 1) points; 2) wins; 3) net average per wicket.
- Points system: 12 for a win, 6 for a tie, 0 for a draw or loss.
- Batting bonus points: 1 point each for reaching 200, 250, 300, and 350 runs within the first 110 overs of each team's first innings.
- Bowling bonus points: 1 point each for taking 3, 5, 7, and 9 wickets within the first 110 overs of each team's first innings.
  (C) Champion

== Fixtures ==
=== Round 1 ===
11–14 November 2024
Scorecard

Otago	v	Central Districts
203 (64.4 overs); Max Chu 85 (106); Brett Randell 4/21 (11.1 overs)		359/9d (120 overs); Dane Cleaver 151* (279); Travis Muller 3/52 (23 overs)
186 (79.5 overs); Max Chu 66 (149); Blair Tickner 3/40 (15 overs)		31/2 (10.4 overs); Jack Boyle 12 (24); Travis Muller 1/13 (5 overs)

Central Districts won by 8 wickets
McLean Park, Napier
Umpires: John Dempsey and Wayne Knights

- Otago won the toss and elected to bat.
- Hunter Kindley and Zac Cumming (Otago) both made their first-class debuts.
- Points: Central Districts 19, Otago 4

11–14 November 2024
Scorecard

Auckland	v	Wellington
184 (52.2 overs); Bevon Jacobs 75 (100); Logan van Beek 5/53 (15 overs)		270 (86.4 overs); Logan van Beek 101 (162); Jordan Sussex 4/50 (20.4 overs)
317 (90.5 overs); Bevon Jacobs 79 (150); Liam Dudding 4/49 (17.5 overs)		177 (46.3 overs); Tom Blundell 63 (85); Danru Ferns 3/40 (10 overs)

Auckland won by 54 runs
Basin Reserve, Wellington
Umpires: Cory Black and Kim Cotton

- Auckland won the toss and elected to bat.
- Bevon Jacobs (Auckland) made his first-class debut.
- Samrath Singh made his first-class debut after replacing Cam Fletcher as a concussion substitute for Auckland during the second innings of Wellington.
- Points: Auckland 16, Wellington 6

11–14 November 2024
Scorecard

Canterbury	v	Northern Districts
361/9d (87 overs); Chad Bowes 107 (113); Kris Clarke 4/83 (20 overs)		352/9d (109 overs); Sandeep Patel 56 (92); Daryl Mitchell 2/16 (10 overs)
193 (58 overs); Cole McConchie 43 (77); Matthew Fisher 3/30 (11 overs)		203/3 (52.5 overs); Jeet Raval 93 (140); Cole McConchie 2/20 (3.5 overs)

Northern Districts won by 7 wickets
Hagley Oval, Christchurch
Umpires: Billy Bowden and Kannan Jagannathan

- Northern Districts won the toss and elected to field.
- Jesse Frew (Canterbury) made his first-class debut.
- Points: Northern Districts 20, Canterbury 8

=== Round 2 ===
19–22 November 2024
Scorecard

Northern Districts	v	Auckland
268 (84.5 overs); Kane Williamson 60 (122); Jordan Sussex 3/53 (17 overs)		150 (53.4 overs); Simon Keene 60 (64); Scott Kuggeleijn 5/43 (14 overs)
252/5d (56.5 overs); Jeet Raval 120* (144); Sean Solia 3/35 (9 overs)		191 (56 overs); Bevon Jacobs 44 (65); Scott Kuggeleijn 4/44 (16 overs)

Northern Districts won by 179 runs
Seddon Park, Hamilton
Umpires: Chris Brown and Wayne Knights

- Auckland won the toss and elected to field.
- Siddhesh Dixit (Auckland) made his first-class debut.
- Points: Northern Districts 18, Auckland 4

19–22 November 2024
Scorecard

Central Districts	v	Canterbury
202 (87 overs); Dane Cleaver 54* (105); Cameron Paul 5/34 (14 overs)		492/7d (124 overs); Rhys Mariu 240 (330); Raymond Toole 2/63 (28 overs)
303 (103 overs); Curtis Heaphy 81 (116); William O'Rourke 4/38 (18 overs)		14/0 (2.5 overs); Rhys Mariu 8* (8)

Canterbury won by 10 wickets
Saxton Oval, Nelson
Umpires: John Dempsey and Greg Pennell

- Canterbury won the toss and elected to field.
- Tyler Annand (Central Districts), Scott Janett, Cameron Paul (Canterbury) all made their first-class debuts.
- Cameron Paul (Canterbury) took his first five-wicket haul in first-class cricket.
- Points: Canterbury 20, Central Districts 2

19–22 November 2024
Scorecard

Wellington	v	Otago
357 (98.1 overs); Nick Kelly 161 (232); Jarrod McKay 4/84 (22.1 overs)		303/8d (92.1 overs); Dale Phillips 135 (250); Liam Dudding 3/61 (20.1 overs)
211/7 (58 overs); Nick Kelly 101* (146); Jarrod McKay 3/66 (15 overs)

Match drawn
University of Otago Oval, Dunedin
Umpires: Kim Cotton and Shaun Haig

- Otago won the toss and elected to field.
- Sam Mycock (Wellington) made his first-class debut.
- Points: Wellington 7, Otago 7

=== Round 3 ===
28 November–1 December 2024
Scorecard

Auckland	v	Canterbury
567/9d (140 overs); Mark Chapman 276 (325); Michael Rippon 4/120 (22 overs)		446/3 (110 overs); Rhys Mariu 185 (240); Danru Ferns 2/69 (20 overs)

Match drawn
Eden Park, Auckland
Umpires: Chris Brown and Pete Pasco

- Auckland won the toss and elected to bat.
- Only 8 overs of play was possible on Day 3 due to rain.
- Points: Auckland 5, Canterbury 5

28 November–1 December 2024
Scorecard

Otago	v	Northern Districts
301/9d (87 overs); Dean Foxcroft 71 (135); Scott Johnston 4/51 (15 overs)		365 (82.3 overs); Brett Hampton 121 (86); Luke Georgeson 3/81 (25 overs)
231 (63.1 overs); Thorn Parkes 68 (126); Matthew Fisher 4/72 (15.1 overs)		145/2 (24.2 overs); Jeet Raval 43 (51); Dean Foxcroft 1/15 (4 overs)

Match drawn
Seddon Park, Hamilton
Umpires: Cory Black and Neil Louw

- Northern Districts won the toss and elected to field.
- Only 37.3 overs of play was possible on Day 3 due to rain.
- Points: Otago 7, Northern Districts 7

28 November–1 December 2024
Scorecard

Wellington	v	Central Districts
251/9d (89 overs); Tim Robinson 92 (126); Jayden Lennox 3/53 (22.1 overs)		302 (112 overs); Dane Cleaver 89 (181); Logan van Beek 4/50 (21 overs)
217 (76 overs); Nick Kelly 85 (166); Blair Tickner 4/52 (22 overs)		167/1 (51.1 overs); Curtis Heaphy 75* (178); James Hartshorn 1/29 (12 overs)

Central Districts won by 9 wickets
McLean Park, Napier
Umpires: Kannan Jagannathan and Wayne Knights

- Wellington won the toss and elected to bat.
- Only 67 overs of play was possible on Day 3 due to rain.
- Points: Central Districts 18, Wellington 6

=== Round 4 ===
7–10 December 2024
Scorecard

Auckland	v	Wellington
329 (95.2 overs); Sean Solia 170* 271; Peter Younghusband 8/127 (31.2 overs)		329 (98.5 overs); Nick Kelly 131 (216); Adithya Ashok 4/65 (27.5 overs)
186 (68.2 overs); Sean Solia 62 (120); Michael Bracewell 5/56 (23 overs)		190/6 (52.3 overs); Nick Greenwood 54 (100); Adithya Ashok 4/76 (23.3 overs)

Wellington won by 4 wickets
Eden Park, Auckland
Umpires: Chris Brown and Kim Cotton

- Auckland won the toss and elected to bat.
- Points: Wellington 19, Auckland 7

7–10 December 2024
Scorecard

Northern Districts	v	Central Districts
204 (59 overs); Bharat Popli 61 (126); Will Clark 5/62 (14 overs)		391 (115.3 overs); Will Clark 109 (130); Matthew Fisher 4/46 (21.3 overs)
362/7 (172 overs); Jeet Raval 107 (396); Brett Randell 2/66 (33 overs)

Match drawn
Bay Oval, Mount Maunganui
Umpires: Shaun Haig and Greg Pennell

- Central Districts won the toss and elected to field.
- Jack Harris (Central Districts) and Matthew Fisher (Northern Districts) both made their first-class debuts.
- Will Clark (Central Districts) took his first five-wicket haul and scored his first century in first-class cricket.
- Points: Central Districts 8, Northern Districts 3

7–10 December 2024
Scorecard

Otago	v	Canterbury
117 (37.5 overs); Luke Georgeson 25 (33); Zak Foulkes 5/47 (12 overs)		331 (96 overs); Rhys Mariu 87 (117); Luke Georgeson 3/45 (15 overs)
515 (174.5 overs); Luke Georgeson 159* (459); Fraser Sheat 3/65 (30 overs)		302/5 (66.1 overs); Rhys Mariu 70 (80); Dean Foxcroft 2/64 (20.1 overs)

Canterbury won by 5 wickets
Rangiora Recreation Ground, Rangiora
Umpires: John Dempsey and Kannan Jagannathan

- Canterbury won the toss and elected to field.
- Bradley Kneebone made his first-class debut after replacing Max Chu as a concussion substitute for Otago during the second innings of Otago.
- Luke Georgeson (Otago) scored his first century in first-class cricket.
- Points: Canterbury 19, Otago 4

=== Round 5 ===
5–8 March 2025
Scorecard

Central Districts	v	Auckland
700/5d (151 overs); Tom Bruce 345 (401); Jock McKenzie 2/101 (25 overs)		421 (131.3 overs); Bevon Jacobs 157 (257); Angus Schaw 3/42 (12 overs)
		151/3 (67.4 overs) (f/o); Siddhesh Dixit 64 (119); Jack Boyle 1/10 (5 overs)

Match drawn
Eden Park, Auckland
Umpires: Wayne Knights and Brad Wilson

- Auckland won the toss and elected to field.
- Lachlan Stackpole (Auckland) made his first-class debut.
- Tom Bruce (Central Districts) scored third highest score in New Zealand's first-class history.
- Bevon Jacobs (Auckland) scored his first century in first-class cricket.
- Angus Schaw replaced Brett Randell as a concussion substitute for Central Districts during first innings of Auckland.
- Points: Central Districts 6, Auckland 4

5–8 March 2025
Scorecard

Northern Districts	v	Canterbury
278 (79.3 overs); Joe Carter 132 (179); Fraser Sheat 3/26 (16 overs)		222 (60.2 overs); Henry Nicholls 52 (84); Joshua Brown 4/51 (10.2 overs)
380 (85.5 overs); Bharat Popli 125 (185); Michael Rae 3/97 (13 overs)		382 (90.2 overs); Zak Foulkes 75 (104); Kris Clarke 5/69 (19 overs)

Northern Districts won by 54 runs
Seddon Park, Hamilton
Umpires: Chris Brown and Neil Louw

- Canterbury won the toss and elected to field.
- Points: Northern Districts 18, Canterbury 5

5–8 March 2025
Scorecard

Wellington	v	Otago
355 (90.3 overs); Nick Kelly 134 (218); Matthew Bacon 5/69 (22 overs)		283 (87 overs); Thorn Parkes 97* (177); Muhammad Abbas 3/22 (8 overs)
316/8d (75 overs); Tim Robinson 85 (112); Dale Phillips 2/47 (8 overs)		217 (74.2 overs); Llew Johnson 80* (165); Logan van Beek 4/56 (20 overs)

Wellington won by 171 runs
Basin Reserve, Wellington
Umpires: Kim Cotton and John Dempsey

- Otago won the toss and elected to field.
- Points: Wellington 20, Otago 6

=== Round 6 ===
13–16 March 2025
Scorecard

Auckland	v	Northern Districts
329 (110.3 overs); Siddhesh Dixit 74 (150); Jeet Raval 3/12 (5 overs)		455 (108.2 overs); Henry Cooper 148 (229); Adithya Ashok 6/110 (25.2 overs)
364 (146.1 overs); Cam Fletcher 132* (289); Jeet Raval 5/43 (18.1 overs)		46/1 (6 overs); Henry Cooper 19 (10); Jock McKenzie 1/29 (3 overs)

Match drawn
Eden Park, Auckland
Umpires: Billy Bowden and Brad Wilson

- Northern Districts won the toss and elected to field.
- Nathan Robinson (Auckland) and Rohit Gulati (Northern Districts) both made their first-class debuts.
- Jeet Raval (Northern Districts) took his first five-wicket haul in first-class cricket.
- Points: 7, Northern Districts 7

13–16 March 2025
Scorecard

Wellington	v	Canterbury
350 (111.5 overs); Tom Blundell 70 (124); Angus McKenzie 3/59 (30 overs)		68 (31.1 overs); Cameron Paul 15 (39); Liam Dudding 4/23 (10 overs)
220 (65.5 overs); Gareth Severin 72 (111); Cameron Paul 3/66 (11 overs)		483 (146.1 overs); Henry Nicholls 171 (383); Logan van Beek 5/89 (33.1 overs)

Wellington won by 19 runs
Rangiora Recreation Ground, Rangiora
Umpires: Cory Black and Pete Pasco

- Canterbury won the toss and elected to field.
- Points: Wellington 20, Canterbury 3

13–16 March 2025
Scorecard

Otago	v	Central Districts
390/7d (119.5 overs); Thorn Parkes 85 (171); Tyler Annand 2/70 (26 overs)		300/6d (108.4 overs); Josh Clarkson 104 (178); Dale Phillips 2/26 (7.4 overs)
234/9d (64 overs); Dale Phillips 52 (88); Jayden Lennox 5/66 (21 overs)		254 (70 overs); Dane Cleaver 98* (155); Dean Foxcroft 4/89 (83)

Otago won by 70 runs
Molyneux Park, Alexandra
Umpires: John Dempsey and Craig Pryor

- Central Districts won the toss and elected to field.
- Thomas O'Connor (Otago) made his first-class debut.
- Jayden Lennox (Central Districts) took his first five-wicket haul in first-class cricket.
- Points: Otago 16, Central Districts 5

=== Round 7 ===
21–24 March 2025
Scorecard

Northern Districts	v	Wellington
119 (44.1 overs); Brett Hampton 31 (38); Liam Dudding 4/19 (12 overs)		189 (61.1 overs); Tom Blundell 43 (89); Brett Hampton 3/38 (11.1 overs)
335 (88 overs); Robert O'Donnell 150 (186); Logan van Beek 4/69 (17 overs)		245 (76.5 overs); Gareth Severin 83 (145); Scott Kuggeleijn 5/57 (18.5 overs)

Northern Districts won by 20 runs
Basin Reserve, Wellington
Umpires: John Dempsey and Pete Pasco

- Wellington won the toss and elected to field.
- Points: Northern Districts 16, Wellington 4

21–24 March 2025
Scorecard

Central Districts	v	Canterbury
111 (33.5 overs); Josh Clarkson 30 (48); Michael Rae 6/31 (8.5 overs)		423 (104.3 overs); Cole McConchie 109 (152); Jayden Lennox 3/51 (12.3 overs)
180 (77.3 overs); Will Young 55 (105); Cameron Paul 5/60 (15 overs)

Canterbury won by an innings and 132 runs
Hagley Oval, Christchurch
Umpires: Kannan Jagannathan and Greg Pennell

- Canterbury won the toss and elected to field.
- Points: Canterbury 20, Central Districts 4

21–24 March 2025
Scorecard

Otago	v	Auckland
306/9d (84 overs); Thorn Parkes 97 (126); Siddhesh Dixit 2/18 (8 overs)		190 (79.2 overs); William O'Donnell 58 (180); Dean Foxcroft 4/51 (24.2 overs)
175/6d (35 overs); Dean Foxcroft 37 (29); Jock McKenzie 2/31 (4 overs)		185/6 (68 overs); Cam Fletcher 62* (117); Dean Foxcroft 2/32 (21 overs)

Match drawn
University of Otago Oval, Dunedin
Umpires: Billy Bowden and Derek Walker

- Otago won the toss and elected to bat.
- No play was possible on day 3 due to rain.
- Points: Otago 7, Auckland 4

=== Round 8 ===
29 March–1 April 2025
Scorecard

Auckland	v	Central Districts
184 (76.3 overs); William O'Donnell 71 (150); Jayden Lennox 4/60 (20.3 overs)		219 (77.1 overs); Dane Cleaver 70 (96); Matt Gibson 3/34 (10 overs)
90 (43.3 overs); Louis Delport 20 (42); Blair Tickner 5/30 (11.3 overs)		56/1 (10.5 overs); Dane Cleaver 23* (16); Louis Delport 1/13 (2 overs)

Central Districts won by 9 wickets
Fitzherbert Park, Palmerston North
Umpires: Kim Cotton and John Dempsey

- Auckland won the toss and elected to bat.
- Points: Central Districts 17, Auckland 4

29 March–1 April 2025
Scorecard

Wellington	v	Canterbury
269 (93.2 overs); Sam Mycock 73 (177); Michael Rae 3/63 (20.2 overs)		274 (85.1 overs); Ish Sodhi 79 (143); Liam Dudding 4/75 (18.1 overs)
396/7d (94 overs); Tom Blundell 119 (115); Michael Rae 3/18 (80 overs)		97 (27.2 overs); Matthew Boyle 24 (33); Michael Snedden 3/11 (4 overs)

Wellington won by 294 runs
Basin Reserve, Wellington
Umpires: Kannan Jagannathan and Greg Pennell

- Canterbury won the toss and elected to field.
- Harry Chamberlain replaced Rhys Mariu as a concussion substitute for Canterbury during second innings of Wellington.
- Jesse Tashkoff (Wellington) scored his first century in first-class cricket.
- Points: Wellington 18, Canterbury 6

29 March–1 April 2025
Scorecard

Northern Districts	v	Otago
411/7d (108 overs); Joe Carter 138 (229); Andrew Hazeldine 3/115 (25 overs)		145 (56 overs); Dean Foxcroft 54 (90); Jeet Raval 4/20 (11 overs)
140/2d (11 overs); Scott Kuggeleijn 71 (26); Toby Hart 1/20 (2 overs)		272 (88.3 overs); Thorn Parkes 50 (99); Neil Wagner 5/53 (21 overs)

Northern Districts won by 134 runs
University of Otago Oval, Dunedin
Umpires: Shaun Haig and Craig Pryor

- Otago won the toss and elected to field.
- Toby Hart (Otago) made his first-class debut.
- Scott Kuggeleijn (Northern Districts) scored fastest half century in New Zealand's first-class cricket history, in terms of balls (19).
- Ben Lockrose replaced Andrew Hazeldine as a concussion substitute for Otago during second innings of Otago.
- Points: Northern Districts 20, Otago 3
