= 2023–24 Plunket Shield season =

Cricket tournament

2023–24 Plunket Shield
- Dates: 20 October 2023 – 27 March 2024
- Administrator: New Zealand Cricket
- Cricket format: First-class
- Tournament format: Round-robin
- Champions: Wellington (22nd title)
- Participants: 6
- Matches: 24
- Most runs: Dale Phillips (686) (Otago)
- Most wickets: Nathan Smith (33) (Wellington)

The 2023–24 Plunket Shield was the 98th season of the Plunket Shield, the domestic first-class cricket competition that is played in New Zealand. The tournament started on 20 October 2023, and the final round of matches began on 24 March 2024.

Wellington won the tournament to clinch their 22nd Plunket Shield title, finishing on 94 points with 4 wins, despite rain washing out the final day of the last round.

== Points table ==
Pos	Team	Pld	W	D	L	Pts
1	Wellington (C)	8	4	4	0	94
2	Northern Districts	8	4	3	1	91
3	Central Districts	8	3	3	2	85
4	Canterbury	8	3	2	3	84
5	Otago	8	1	2	5	54
6	Auckland	8	1	2	5	51

Source: ESPNcricinfo
Rules for classification: 1) points; 2) wins; 3) net average per wicket.
- Points system: 12 for a win, 6 for a tie, 0 for a draw or loss.
- Batting bonus points: 1 point each for reaching 200, 250, 300, and 350 runs within the first 110 overs of each team's first innings.
- Bowling bonus points: 1 point each for taking 3, 5, 7, and 9 wickets within the first 110 overs of each team's first innings.
  (C) Champion

== Fixtures ==
=== Round 1 ===
20–23 October 2023
Scorecard

Central Districts	v	Auckland
509/8d (141.5 overs); Greg Hay 115 (284); Adithya Ashok 4/141 (31 overs)		264 (81 overs); Sean Solia 81 (165); Blair Tickner 3/57 (16 overs)
		168 (60.5 overs) (f/o); George Worker 67 (126); Raymond Toole 4/33 (13 overs)

Central Districts won by an innings and 77 runs
Eden Park Outer Oval, Auckland
Umpires: Billy Bowden and Wayne Knights

- Auckland won the toss and elected to field.
- Points: Central Districts 19, Auckland 3

20–23 October 2023
Scorecard

Otago	v	Northern Districts
267 (83.5 overs); Max Chu 80 (180); Scott Kuggeleijn 6/60 (19.5 overs)		376/9 (88.2 overs); Sandeep Patel 145 (186); Jacob Duffy 3/51 (21) overs)
77 (34.3 overs); Ben Lockrose 34 (29); Scott Kuggeleijn 3/24 (14 overs)

Northern Districts won by an innings and 32 runs
Seddon Park, Hamilton
Umpires: John Dempsey and Tim Parlane

- Northern Districts won the toss and elected to field.
- Jamal Todd (Otago) made his first-class debut.
- Sandeep Patel (Northern Districts) scored his maiden century in first-class cricket.
- Points: Northern Districts 20, Otago 6.

20–23 October 2023
Scorecard

Wellington	v	Canterbury
325 (104.5 overs); Nick Greenwood 79 (130); Zak Foulkes 4/43 (14.5 overs)		156 (45.1 overs); Michael Rippon 31 (40); Peter Younghusband 3/5 (2.1 overs)
145 (41.5 overs); Muhammad Abbas 41 (55); Fraser Sheat 4/50 (13.5 overs)		185 (54.5 overs); Mitchell Hay 44 (55); Nathan Smith 3/39 (14 overs)

Wellington won by 129 runs
Eden Park Outer Oval, Auckland
Umpires: Kim Cotton and Shaun Haig

- Canterbury won the toss and elected to field.
- Dylan Hunter (Canterbury) made his first-class debut.
- Points: Wellington 19, Canterbury 4.

=== Round 2 ===
28–31 October 2023
Scorecard

Auckland	v	Northern Districts
184 (61 overs); Robert O'Donnell 61 (92); Kris Clarke 6/45 (14 overs)		295 (81.1 overs); Brett Hampton 59 (73); Adithya Ashok 7/103 (26.1 overs)
161 (47.3 overs); Quinn Sunde 35 (60); Matthew Fisher 6/45 (15 overs)		51/1 (4.1 overs); Tim Seifert 24 (11); Danru Ferns 1/15 (2.1 overs)

Northern Districts won by 9 wickets
Eden Park, Auckland
Umpires: Billy Bowden and Tim Parlane

- Northern Districts won the toss and elected to field.
- Points: Northern Districts 18, Auckland 4.

28–31 October 2023
Scorecard

Wellington	v	Central Districts
201 (63.1 overs); Callum McLachlan 49 (72); Raymond Toole 3/45 (11 overs)		169 (64.1 overs); Brett Randell 40 (81); Nathan Smith 4/34 (15.1 overs)
324 (104.5 overs); Nick Kelly 98 (114); Brett Randell 3/45 (15 overs)		184 (58.4 overs); Ajaz Patel 49 (55); James Hartshorn 4/17 (7 overs)

Wellington won by 172 runs
Saxton Oval, Nelson
Umpires: John Dempsey and Kannan Jagannathan

- Wellington won the toss and elected to bat.
- Points: Wellington 17, Central Districts 4.

28–31 October 2023
Scorecard

Canterbury	v	Otago
313/9 (94.5 overs); Henry Nicholls 124 (186); Jack Gibson 4/58 (18 overs)		184 (61.3 overs); Dale Phillips 61 (75); Fraser Sheat 4/25 (14 overs)
333/4d (91 overs); Cole McConchie 108 (167); Jacob Duffy 2/70 (18 overs)		254/9 (109.2 overs); Jamal Todd 64 (177); Kyle Jamieson 4/43 (22 overs)

Match drawn
Hagley Oval, Christchurch
Umpires: Cory Black and Derek Walker

- Otago won the toss and elected to field.
- Points: Canterbury 7, Otago 4.

=== Round 3 ===
6–9 November 2023
Scorecard

Wellington	v	Northern Districts
270 (64.1 overs); Tim Robinson 60 (85); Kris Clarke 6/77 (18 overs)		191 (45.2 overs); Brett Hampton 85 (77); Nathan Smith 5/67 (17.2 overs)
224/9d (55.5 overs); Nick Greenwood 73 (102); Scott Kuggeleijn 4/53 (14 overs)		248/4 (67 overs); Henry Cooper 73 (124); Tim Robinson 2/11 (4 overs)

Match drawn
Basin Reserve, Wellington
Umpires: Billy Bowden and Cory Black

- Northern Districts won the toss and elected to field.
- Points: Wellington 6, Northern Districts 4.

6–9 November 2023
Scorecard

Auckland	v	Canterbury
217 (90.1 overs); George Worker 60 (117); Michael Rae 3/27 (13.1 overs)		413/9d (121 overs); Henry Nicholls 120 (214); Adithya Ashok 3/127 (46 overs)
256 (128.3 overs); Sean Solia 67 (165); Michael Rippon 4/85 (43 overs)		63/2 (16.1 overs); Henry Nicholls 30* (47); Simon Keene 1/15 (5 overs)

Canterbury won by 8 wickets
Hagley Oval, Christchurch
Umpires: Kim Cotton and Derek Walker

- Canterbury won the toss and elected to field.
- Points: Canterbury 20, Auckland 3.

6–9 November 2023
Scorecard

Central Districts	v	Otago
182 (77 overs); Gerg Hay 59 (175); Jacob Duffy 3/28 (18 overs)		210 (85.1 overs); Thorn Parkes 70 (139); Doug Bracewell 4/39 (18.1 overs)
332/9d (109 overs); Tom Bruce 105* (180); Jacob Duffy 3/58 (27 overs)		254 (57.1 overs); Dale Phillips 85 (130); Doug Bracewell 3/49 (11 overs)

Central Districts won by 50 runs
University of Otago Oval, Dunedin
Umpires: Shaun Haig and Wayne Knights

- Otago won the toss and elected to field.
- Points: Central Districts 16, Otago 5.

=== Round 4 ===
15–18 November 2023
Scorecard

Auckland	v	Wellington
500/8d (150 overs); Sean Solia 206 (434); Peter Younghusband 3/167 (47 overs)		352/9 (106.2 overs); Gareth Severin 143 (253); Louis Delport 6/98 (36.2 overs)

Match drawn
Eden Park, Auckland
Umpires: Kannan Jagannathan and Derek Walker

- Auckland won the toss and elected to bat.
- Gareth Severin (Wellington) scored his maiden century in first-class cricket.
- Points: Auckland 7, Wellington 5.

15–18 November 2023
Scorecard

Canterbury	v	Central Districts
225 (80 overs); Matthew Boyle 54 (88); Brett Randell 4/25 (17 overs)		177 (73.1 overs); Dane Cleaver 34 (68); William O'Rourke 3/24 (15 overs)
320 (81 overs); Angus McKenzie 53 (87); Raymond Toole 6/90 (19 overs)		256/8 (76 overs); Jack Boyle 72 (139); William O'Rourke 3/54 (17 overs)

Match drawn
McLean Park, Napier
Umpires: John Dempsey and Wayne Knights

- Canterbury won the toss and elected to bat.
- Points: Canterbury 5, Central Districts 4.

15–18 November 2023
Scorecard

Northern Districts	v	Otago
117 (34.5 overs); Scott Kuggeleijn 36 (41); Luke Georgeson 4/33 (8.5 overs)		240 (72 overs); Dale Phillips 70 (75); Brett Hampton 7/41 (19 overs)
336 (96.1 overs); Joe Carter 98 (247); Jacob Duffy 6/89 (27.1 overs)		179 (63.5 overs); Luke Georgeson 65* (155); Neil Wagner 4/38 (14.5 overs)

Northern Districts won by 34 runs
University of Otago Oval, Dunedin
Umpires: Cory Black and Tim Parlane

- Otago won the toss and elected to field.
- Llew Johnson (Otago) made his first-class debut.
- Points: Northern Districts 16, Otago 5

=== Round 5 ===
29 February – 3 March 2024
Scorecard

Central Districts	v	Northern Districts
427 (128.1 overs); Angus Schaw 114 (199); Matthew Fisher 4/100 (27 overs)		331 (126.5 overs); Bharat Popli 111 (203); Ajaz Patel 7/78 (39.5 overs)
117/2 (33 overs); Curtis Heaphy 58* (122); Tim Pringle 1/16 (6 overs)

Match drawn
Bay Oval, Mount Maunganui
Umpires: Kim Cotton and Tim Parlane

- Central Districts won the toss and elected to bat.
- Angus Schaw (Central Districts) made his first-class debut and scored his maiden century in first-class cricket.
- Blair Tickner was replaced by Jayden Lennox during the match after sustaining a concussion.
- Points: Central Districts 7, Northern Districts 5

29 February – 3 March 2024
Scorecard

Canterbury	v	Wellington
526 (127.3 overs); Rhys Mariu 145 (263); Peter Younghusband 3/99 (25.5 overs)		308 (81.5 overs); Nick Kelly 138 (201); Angus McKenzie 4/64 (17 overs)
109 (44.4 overs); Mitchell Hay 35* (91); Nathan Smith 6/36 (14.4 overs)		328/5 (91.2 overs); Muhammad Abbas 110* (160); Zakary Foulkes 2/83 (16.2 overs)

Wellington won by 5 wickets
Rangiora Recreation Ground, Rangiora
Umpires: John Dempsey and Shaun Haig

- Wellington won the toss and elected to field.
- Ken McClure was replaced by Michael Rippon during the match after sustaining a concussion.
- Points: Wellington 17, Canterbury 8

29 February – 3 March 2024
Scorecard

Auckland	v	Otago
410 (107.2 overs); Mark Chapman 123 (194); Travis Muller 3/80 (18 overs)		319 (103 overs); Thorn Parkes 67 (125); Harjot Johal 4/53 (20 overs)
295/4d (61 overs); Robert O'Donnell 151* (146); Travis Muller 2/40 (11 overs)		327/9 (103 overs); Dean Foxcroft 174 (238); Harjot Johal 3/64 (18 overs)

Match drawn
University Oval, Dunedin
Umpires: Cory Black and Chris Brown

- Auckland won the toss and elected to bat.
- Harjot Johal, Jock McKenzie and Angus Olliver (Auckland) all made their first-class debuts.
- Points: Auckland 8, Otago 7

=== Round 6 ===
8–11 March 2024
Scorecard

Northern Districts	v	Auckland
247 (89.1 overs); Joe Carter 124 (227); Danru Ferns 6/62 (17.1 overs)		158 (51.5 overs); Harjot Johal 65 (99); Brett Hampton 3/18 (11 overs)
334/9d (99.5 overs); Brett Hampton 100* (100); Louis Delport 4/131 (37 overs)		360 (138.4 overs); William O'Donnell 93 (258); Henry Cooper 3/38 (11.4 overs)

Northern Districts won by 63 runs
Seddon Park, Hamilton
Umpires: Cory Black and Derek Walker

- Auckland won the toss and elected to field.
- Brett Hampton (Northern Districts) scored his maiden century in first-class cricket.
- Points: Northern Districts 17, Auckland 4

8–11 March 2024
Scorecard

Wellington	v	Central Districts
295 (92.3 overs); Nick Greenwood 54 (83); Liam Dudding 4/67 (18.3 overs)		572/9d (149 overs); Brad Schmulian 186 (257); Jesse Tashkoff 2/80 (18 overs)
290/9 (118 overs); Logan van Beek 52* (119); Blair Tickner 3/79 (28 overs)

Match drawn
Fitzherbert Park, Palmerston North
Umpires: Wayne Knights and Pete Pasco

- Central Districts won the toss and elected to field.
- Curtis Heaphy (Central Districts) scored his maiden century in first-class cricket.
- Points: Wellington 3, Central Districts 8

8–11 March 2024
Scorecard

Canterbury	v	Otago
144 (38.5 overs); Michael Rippon 27 (58); Luke Georgeson 5/60 (12.5 overs)		188 (63 overs); Luke Georgeson 45 (80); Sean Davey 5/41 (18 overs)
180 (68.1 overs); Angus McKenzie 42* (60); Jacob Duffy 4/36 (19.1 overs)		138/1 (68.1 overs); Dale Phillips 70* (93); Michael Rippon 1/31 (5 overs)

Otago won by 9 wickets
Molyneux Park, Alexandra
Umpires: Billy Bowden and Kim Cotton

- Otago won the toss and elected to field.
- Luke Georgeson (Otago) took his maiden five-wicket haul in first-class cricket.
- Points: Otago 16, Canterbury 4

=== Round 7 ===
16–19 March 2024
Scorecard

Auckland	v	Central Districts
240 (93.3 overs); Jock McKenzie 48 (103); Blair Tickner 4/62 (22.3 overs)		340 (111.3 overs); Tom Bruce 95 (154); Ben Lister 3/37 (23 overs)
281 (81.3 overs); Mark Chapman 83 (68); Liam Dudding 3/44 (11.3 overs)		140 (45.3 overs); Tom Bruce 37 (55); Jordan Sussex 6/46 (15.3 overs)

Auckland won by 41 runs
McLean Park, Napier
Umpires: John Dempsey and Glen Walklin

- Central Districts won the toss and elected to field.
- Jordan Sussex (Auckland) took his maiden five-wicket haul in first-class cricket.
- Points: Auckland 17, Central Districts 7

16–19 March 2024
Scorecard

Otago	v	Wellington
280 (83.5 overs); Dale Phillips 127 (203); Peter Younghusband 5/65 (19 overs)		421 (128.4 overs); Gareth Severin 105 (178); Dean Foxcroft 6/84 (27 overs)
99 (27.4 overs); Max Chu 17 (19); Michael Bracewell 8/41 (11.4 overs)

Wellington won by an innings 42 runs
Basin Reserve, Wellington
Umpires: Chris Brown and Tim Parlane

- Wellington won the toss and elected to field.
- Points: Wellington 20, Otago 6

16–19 March 2024
Scorecard

Northern Districts	v	Canterbury
235 (75.5 overs); Scott Kuggeleijn 65 (102); Zak Foulkes 3/54 (15 overs)		398 (124.3 overs); Mitchell Hay 146 (259); Scott Kuggeleijn 6/79 (31.3 overs)
298 (105.3 overs); Joe Carter 54 (94); Michael Rae 4/73 (22.3 overs)		136/5 (32.1 overs); Chad Bowes 87* (69); Brett Hampton 2/35 (8 overs)

Canterbury won by 5 wickets
Rangiora Recreation Ground, Rangiora
Umpires: Shaun Haig and Greg Pennell

- Canterbury won the toss and elected to field.
- Mitchell Hay (Canterbury) scored his maiden century in first-class cricket.
- Points: Canterbury 19, Northern Districts 3

=== Round 8 ===
24–27 March 2024
Scorecard

Auckland	v	Canterbury
216 (67 overs); Quinn Sunde 41 (85); Zak Foulkes 5/38 (16 overs)		242 (59.5 overs); Mitchell Hay 54* (96); Jordan Sussex 8/71 (18.5 overs)
257 (79 overs); Sean Solia 84 (140); Sean Davey 4/48 (17 overs)		232/4 (47.5 overs); Rhys Mariu 62* (77); Louis Delport 3/80 (15.5 overs)

Canterbury won by 6 wickets
Eden Park Outer Oval, Auckland
Umpires: Billy Bowden and Wayne Knights

- Canterbury won the toss and elected to field.
- Zak Foulkes (Canterbury) took his maiden five-wicket haul in first-class cricket.
- Points: Canterbury 17, Auckland 5

24–27 March 2024
Scorecard

Wellington	v	Northern Districts
323 (103.5 overs); Tom Blundell 103 (157); Joe Walker 4/96 (29 overs)		362 (98.1 overs); Tim Seifert 104 (137); Logan van Beek 3/72 (13.1 overs)
127/4 (36 overs); Tim Robinson 44 (88); Joe Walker 2/45 (9 overs)

Match drawn
Seddon Park, Hamilton
Umpires: John Dempsey and Shaun Haig

- Wellington won the toss and elected to bat.
- No play was possible on day 4 due to rain.
- Points: Wellington 7, Northern Districts 8

24–27 March 2024
Scorecard

Otago	v	Central Districts
309 (84.5 overs); Dale Phillips 144 (210); William Clark 3/54 (14 overs)		580 (169.3 overs); Greg Hay 179 (434); Travis Muller 2/55 (22 overs)
231 (87.2 overs); Travis Muller 71 (197); Liam Dudding 5/32 (18 overs)

Central Districts won by an innings and 40 runs
McLean Park, Napier
Umpires: Damian Morrow and Derek Walker

- Central Districts won the toss and elected to field.
- Points: Central Districts 20, Otago 5
