= 2021–22 Ford Trophy =

Cricket tournament

- Dates: 30 November 2021 – 26 February 2022
- Administrator: New Zealand Cricket
- Cricket format: List A cricket
- Tournament format(s): Round-robin and Knockout
- Champions: Auckland (13th title)
- Participants: 6
- Matches: 30
- Most runs: George Worker (672)
- Most wickets: Lockie Ferguson (14); Matthew Bacon (14)
- Official website: www.blackcaps.co.nz

The 2021–22 Ford Trophy was the 51st season of The Ford Trophy, the List A cricket tournament that was played in New Zealand. It was the eleventh in a sponsorship deal between New Zealand Cricket and Ford Motor Company. The tournament ran from November 2021 to February 2022. In July 2021, New Zealand Cricket named all the squads for the domestic teams ahead of the 2021–22 season, and confirmed the fixtures in September 2021. Canterbury were the defending champions.

Following the completion of matches played on 20 February 2022, Central Districts were the first team to reach the final of the tournament. They were joined by Auckland, who beat Otago in their penultimate group match to secure their berth in the final. In the final, Auckland beat Central Districts by eight wickets to win the tournament.

== Points table ==
Pos	Team	Pld	W	L	NR	Pts	NRR
1	Central Districts	9	5	0	4	31	2.925
2	Auckland	8	5	3	0	23	0.373
3	Wellington	10	4	3	3	23	0.361
4	Northern Districts	10	2	4	4	18	0.096
5	Otago	9	3	5	1	15	−1.128
6	Canterbury	10	1	5	4	12	−1.495

Source: ESPN Cricinfo

Advanced to the Final

== Fixtures ==
30 November 2021
Scorecard

Northern Districts; 239/8 (32 overs)	v	Canterbury; 240/3 (27.2 overs)
Jeet Raval 74 (57); Matt Henry 2/42 (7 overs)		Ken McClure 87 (55); Joe Walker 1/34 (5 overs)

Canterbury won by 7 wickets
Seddon Park, Hamilton
Umpires: Chris Brown and Tim Parlane

- Canterbury won the toss and elected to field.
- The match was reduced to 32 overs per side due to rain.

1 December 2021
Scorecard

Wellington; 255/7 (50 overs)	v	Otago; 242 (49 overs)
Troy Johnson 73 (87); Michael Rippon 4/41 (10 overs)		Neil Broom 72 (94); Peter Younghusband 3/56 (10 overs)

Wellington won by 13 runs
Basin Reserve, Wellington
Umpires: Cory Black and Shaun Haig

- Otago won the toss and elected to field.

6 December 2021
Scorecard

Canterbury	v	Northern Districts

Match abandoned
Rangiora Recreation Ground, Rangiora
Umpires: John Bromley and Tim Parlane

- No toss.
- No play was possible due to rain.

14 December 2021
Scorecard

Canterbury; 222 (49.2 overs)	v	Otago; 223/5 (42.5 overs)
Henry Shipley 55 (67); Matthew Bacon 4/45 (7.2 overs)		Josh Finnie 72* (74); Will Williams 2/28 (10 overs)

Otago won by 5 wickets
University Oval, Dunedin
Umpires: Derek Walker and John Bromley

- Otago won the toss and elected to field.

15 December 2021
Scorecard

Northern Districts	v	Central Districts

Match abandoned
Seddon Park, Hamilton
Umpires: Billy Bowden and Kim Cotton

- No toss
- No play was possible due to rain.

21 December 2021
Scorecard

Wellington; 333/9 (50 overs)	v	Otago; 238 (43.4 overs)
Troy Johnson 88 (78); Jacob Duffy 3/70 (7 overs)		Michael Rippon 68* (65); Michael Bracewell 3/36 (8 overs)

Wellington won by 95 runs
Basin Reserve, Wellington
Umpires: Shaun Haig and Eugene Sanders

- Otago won the toss and elected to field.
- Llew Johnson (Otago) made his List A debut.

1 January 2022
Scorecard

Wellington; 307/9 (50 overs)	v	Auckland; 310/4 (49.4 overs)
Finn Allen 86 (55); Danru Ferns 3/68 (10 overs)		George Worker 132 (128); Peter Younghusband 1/47 (8 overs)

Auckland won by 6 wickets
Basin Reserve, Wellington
Umpires: Kim Cotton and Derek Walker

- Wellington won the toss and elected to bat.
- Adithya Ashok (Auckland) made his List A debut.

3 January 2022
Scorecard

Auckland; 207 (48.3 overs)	v	Wellington; 210/5 (42.5 overs)
William Somerville 59 (77); Logan van Beek 3/29 (10 overs)		Luke Georgeson 51 (52); William Somerville 2/28 (10 overs)

Wellington won by 5 wickets
Eden Park, Auckland
Umpires: Kim Cotton and Derek Walker

- Auckland won the toss and elected to bat.

3 January 2022
Scorecard

Otago; 258/7 (50 overs)	v	Canterbury; 205 (43.3 overs)
Mitch Renwick 55 (85); William O'Rourke 2/31 (10 overs)		Henry Shipley 78 (64); Matthew Bacon 4/51 (9.3 overs)

Otago won by 53 runs
Rangiora Recreation Ground, Rangiora
Umpires: John Dempsey and Tim Parlane

- Canterbury won the toss and elected to field.
- William O’Rourke (Canterbury) made his List A debut.

6 January 2022
Scorecard

Northern Districts; 143 (35.4 overs)	v	Central Districts; 145/4 (30.4 overs)
Joe Carter 38 (54); Seth Rance 4/25 (7.4 overs)		Josh Clarkson 50* (34); Anurag Verma 2/49 (8.4 overs)

Central Districts won by 6 wickets
Pukekura Park, New Plymouth
Umpires: Cory Black and Billy Bowden

- Central Districts won the toss and elected to field.

9 January 2022
Scorecard

Auckland; 221 (49.2 overs)	v	Northern Districts; 222/2 (38.1 overs)
Ben Horne 45 (57); Anurag Verma 3/29 (6.2 overs)		Joe Carter 105* (95); Ross ter Braak 1/32 (7 overs)

Northern Districts won by 8 wickets
Eden Park, Auckland
Umpires: Billy Bowden and John Bromley

- Northern Districts won the toss and elected to field.

11 January 2022
Scorecard

Auckland; 303/7 (50 overs)	v	Northern Districts; 256 (39.5 overs)
George Worker 132 (142); Zak Gibson 4/61 (10 overs)		Colin de Grandhomme 126 (104); Lockie Ferguson 6/34 (8 overs)

Auckland won by 47 runs
Eden Park, Auckland
Umpires: Billy Bowden and Tim Parlane

- Northern Districts won the toss and elected to field.

1 February 2022
Scorecard

Central Districts; 296/7 (50 overs)	v	Auckland; 183 (39.3 overs)
Will Young 107 (110); Adithya Ashok 3/53 (10 overs)		Martin Guptill 54 (83); Blair Tickner 4/37 (7.3 overs)

Central Districts won by 113 runs
Fitzherbert Park, Palmerston North
Umpires: John Bromley and Shaun Haig

- Auckland won the toss and elected to field.

4 February 2022
Scorecard

Canterbury; 218/8 (50 overs)	v	Wellington; 219/7 (42.2 overs)
Chad Bowes 99 (116); Logan van Beek 2/28 (5 overs)		Finn Allen 68 (65); Matt Henry 2/47 (9 overs)

Wellington won by 3 wickets
Basin Reserve, Wellington
Umpires: Billy Bowden and John Dempsey

- Wellington won the toss and elected to field.

4 February 2022
Scorecard

Otago	v	Central Districts

Match abandoned
University Oval, Dunedin
Umpires: Chris Gaffaney and Cory Black

- No toss.
- No play was possible due to rain.

6 February 2022
Scorecard

Wellington	v	Canterbury

Match abandoned
Basin Reserve, Wellington
Umpires: Billy Bowden and John Dempsey

- No toss.
- No play was possible due to rain.

6 February 2022
Scorecard

Central Districts; 314/7 (37 overs)	v	Otago; 114 (23.5 overs)
Bayley Wiggins 80 (64); Matthew Bacon 2/59 (6 overs)		Max Chu 31 (38); Seth Rance 3/19 (5 overs)

Central Districts won by 200 runs
University Oval, Dunedin
Umpires: Chris Gaffaney and Shaun Haig

- Otago won the toss and elected to field.
- The match was reduced to 37 overs per side due to rain.

11 February 2022
Scorecard

Northern Districts	v	Wellington

Match abandoned
Seddon Park, Hamilton
Umpires: Damian Morrow and Pete Pasco

- No toss.
- No play was possible due to rain.

11 February 2022
Scorecard

Canterbury	v	Central Districts

Match abandoned
Hagley Oval, Christchurch
Umpires: Chris Brown and John Bromley

- No toss.
- No play was possible due to rain.

13 February 2022
Scorecard

Canterbury	v	Central Districts

Match abandoned
Rangiora Recreation Ground, Rangiora

- No toss.
- No play was possible due to rain.

13 February 2022
Scorecard

Northern Districts	v	Wellington

Match abandoned
Seddon Park, Hamilton

- No toss.
- No play was possible due to rain.

18 February 2022
Scorecard

Central Districts; 310/5 (29 overs)	v	Wellington; 184/6 (20 overs)
Ross Taylor 111* (51); Nathan Smith 3/51 (6 overs)		Michael Bracewell 93 (42); Jayden Lennox 3/57 (6 overs)

Central Districts won by 43 runs (DLS method)
Pukekura Park, New Plymouth
Umpires: Eugene Sanders and Kannan Jagannathan

- Wellington won the toss and elected to field.
- Wellington were set a revised target of 228 runs from 20 overs due to rain.

18 February 2022
Scorecard

Auckland; 365/5 (50 overs)	v	Canterbury; 146 (32.2 overs)
Robert O'Donnell 100* (79); Henry Shipley 2/65 (10 overs)		Leo Carter 36 (38); Adithya Ashok 4/25 (7 overs)

Auckland won by 219 runs
Eden Park, Auckland
Umpires: Billy Bowden and Pete Pasco

- Canterbury won the toss and elected to field.

18 February 2022
Scorecard

Otago; 139 (39.5 overs)	v	Northern Districts; 140/4 (22.4 overs)
Nick Kelly 59 (82); Matthew Fisher 3/24 (8.5 overs)		Tim Seifert 51 (46); Michael Rippon 3/50 (8.4 overs)

Northern Districts won by 6 wickets
Cobham Oval, Whangārei
Umpires: Damian Morrow and Tim Parlane

- Northern Districts won the toss and elected to field.
- Chris Swanson (Northern Districts) made his List A debut.

20 February 2022
Scorecard

Otago; 132 (42.4 overs)	v	Northern Districts; 118 (26.3 overs)
Dale Phillips 36 (54); Matthew Fisher 4/34 (8.4 overs)		Tim Seifert 45 (44); Ben Lockrose 3/17 (3.3 overs)

Otago won by 1 run (DLS method)
Cobham Oval, Whangārei
Umpires: Damian Morrow and Tim Parlane

- Otago won the toss and elected to bat.
- Northern Districts were set a revised target of 120 runs from 26.3 overs due to rain.

20 February 2022
Scorecard

Wellington; 191/8 (32 overs)	v	Central Districts; 194/8 (24.5 overs)
Jakob Bhula 50 (56); Adam Milne 3/35 (7 overs)		Ross Taylor 50 (31); Logan van Beek 2/34 (4 overs)

Central Districts won by 2 wickets
Pukekura Park, New Plymouth
Umpires: Eugene Sanders and Kannan Jagannathan

- Wellington won the toss and elected to bat.
- The match was reduced to 32 overs per side due to rain.

20 February 2022
Scorecard

Canterbury; 226/9 (50 overs)	v	Auckland; 227/4 (36.5 overs)
Leo Carter 58 (73); Lockie Ferguson 2/25 (7 overs)		Glenn Phillips 122* (102); William O’Rourke 1/40 (7 overs)

Auckland won by 6 wickets
Eden Park, Auckland
Umpires: Billy Bowden and Pete Pasco

- Canterbury won the toss and elected to bat.
- Zak Foulkes (Canterbury) made his List A debut.

22 February 2022
Scorecard

Auckland; 380/6 (50 overs)	v	Otago; 284/6 (50 overs)
Martin Guptill 137 (106); Angus McKenzie 3/66 (10 overs)		Anaru Kitchen 106* (95); Simon Keene 4/47 (10 overs)

Auckland won by 96 runs
Eden Park, Auckland
Umpires: Billy Bowden and Tim Parlane

- Auckland won the toss and elected to bat.
- Simon Keene (Auckland) made his List A debut.

24 February 2022
Scorecard

Central Districts; 301 (49.2 overs)	v	Auckland; 305/7 (49.3 overs)
Brad Schmulian 78 (98); Ollie Pringle 4/51 (9 overs)		George Worker 139* (144); Adam Milne 2/18 (6 overs)

Auckland won by 3 wickets
Eden Park, Auckland
Umpires: Billy Bowden and Tim Parlane

- Central Districts won the toss and elected to bat.

== Final ==
Final
26 February 2022
Scorecard

Central Districts; 213 (49.5 overs)	v	Auckland; 217/2 (36.1 overs)
Tom Bruce 63 (66); Lockie Ferguson 4/32 (10 overs)		Mark Chapman 92* (75); Seth Rance 1/25 (6 overs)

Auckland won by 8 wickets
John Davies Oval, Queenstown
Umpires: Derek Walker and John Bromley

- Auckland won the toss and elected to field.
