= 2026–27 Ford Trophy =

Cricket tournament

- Dates: 28 October 2026 – 21 February 2027
- Administrator: New Zealand Cricket
- Cricket format: List A cricket
- Tournament format(s): Double round-robin and Knockout
- Participants: 6
- Matches: 32
- Official website: Ford Trophy

The 2026–27 Ford Trophy is the 56th season of the New Zealand domestic List A cricket tournament. It is the 13th in a sponsorship deal between New Zealand Cricket and Ford Motor Company. The tournament is being held from 28 October 2026 to 21 February 2027.

Central Districts are the defending champions.

== Teams and standings ==
=== Points table ===
Pos	Team	Pld	W	L	T	NR	Pts	NRR	Qualification
1	Auckland	0	0	0	0	0	0	—	Advance to Grand Final
2	Canterbury	0	0	0	0	0	0	—	Advance to Elimination Final
3	Central Districts	0	0	0	0	0	0	—	Advance to Elimination Final
4	Northern Districts	0	0	0	0	0	0	—	
5	Otago	0	0	0	0	0	0	—	
6	Wellington	0	0	0	0	0	0	—	

Source: Cricinfo, NZC
- Points awarded as follows:
  - Won - 4, Lost - 0, Tied - 2, No Result - 2, Abandoned - 2, Bonus Point (Run Rate 1.25x Opponents') - 1

=== Points summary ===
Team	Group matches										Play-offs	
Team	1	2	3	4	5	6	7	8	9	10	EF	F
Auckland	4											
Canterbury	0											
Central Districts	0											
Northern Districts	4											
Otago	5											
Wellington	0											

Win	Loss	Tie	No result	Eliminated

- Note: The total points at the end of each group match are listed.
- Note: Click on the points or results to see the match summary.

== Fixtures ==
=== Round 1 ===
Match 1
28 October 2026
10:30
Scorecard

Auckland; 361/5 (50 overs)	v	Canterbury; 311 (44.1 overs)
Sean Solia 120 (119); Angus McKenzie 2/61 (10 overs)		Chad Bowes 154 (106); Adithya Ashok 3/64 (9 overs)

Auckland won by 33 runs (DLS method)
Eden Park Outer Oval, Auckland
Umpires: Vinit Mahna and Greg Pennell

- Canterbury won the toss and elected to field.
- Harry Cullen-Hieatt, Luke Watson and Jack Wright (Auckland) all made their List A debuts.
- Canterbury were set a revised target of 345 runs from 46 overs due to rain.
- Points: Auckland 4, Canterbury 0

Match 2
28 October 2026
10:30
Scorecard

Northern Districts; 403/6 (50 overs)	v	Central Districts; 341 (44.2 overs)
Robert O'Donnell 145 (102); Toby Findlay 3/77 (10 overs)		Sam Cassidy 137 (93); Joshua Brown 3/36 (8.2 overs)

Northern Districts won by 62 runs
Saxton Oval, Nelson
Umpires: John Dempsey and Tyron Davies

- Northern Districts won the toss and elected to bat.
- Sam Cassidy, Taylor Bettelheim (Central Districts) and James Naylor (Northern Districts) all made their List A debuts.
- Sam Cassidy (Central Districts) scored his maiden century in List A cricket.
- Points: Northern Districts 4, Central Districts 0

Match 3
29 October 2026
10:30
Scorecard

Wellington; 213 (48.1 overs)	v	Otago; 214/4 (37.1 overs)
Oscar Jackson 52 (59); Matthew Bacon 3/41 (9 overs)		Jack Boyle 74* (111); Liam Dudding 1/32 (7.1 overs)

Otago won by 6 wickets
Basin Reserve, Wellington
Umpires: Billy Bowden and Neil Louw

- Otago won the toss and elected to field.
- Sam Morgan (Wellington) and Tom Jones (Otago) both made their List A debuts.
- Points: Otago 5, Wellington 0

=== Round 2 ===
Match 4
31 October 2026
10:30
Scorecard

Northern Districts	v	Auckland

Match 5
31 October 2026
10:30
Scorecard

Canterbury	v	Wellington

Match 6
31 October 2026
10:30
Scorecard

Otago	v	Central Districts

=== Round 3 ===
Match 7
4 November 2026
10:30
Scorecard

Central Districts	v	Auckland

Match 8
4 November 2026
10:30
Scorecard

Wellington	v	Northern Districts

Match 9
4 November 2026
10:30
Scorecard

Otago	v	Canterbury

=== Round 4 ===
Match 10
8 November 2026
10:30
Scorecard

Northern Districts	v	Otago

Match 11
8 November 2026
10:30
Scorecard

Wellington	v	Auckland

Match 12
8 November 2026
10:30
Scorecard

Central Districts	v	Canterbury

=== Round 5 ===
Match 13
12 November 2026
10:30
Scorecard

Auckland	v	Otago

Match 14
12 November 2026
10:30
Scorecard

Central Districts	v	Wellington

Match 15
12 November 2026
10:30
Scorecard

Canterbury	v	Northern Districts

=== Round 6 ===
Match 16
3 February 2027
10:30
Scorecard

Auckland	v	Wellington

Match 17
3 February 2027
10:30
Scorecard

Central Districts	v	Canterbury

Match 18
3 February 2027
10:30
Scorecard

Otago	v	Northern Districts

=== Round 7 ===
Match 19
5 February 2027
10:30
Scorecard

Canterbury	v	Auckland

Match 20
5 February 2027
10:30
Scorecard

Northern Districts	v	Wellington

Match 21
7 February 2027
10:30
Scorecard

Central Districts	v	Otago

=== Round 8 ===
Match 22
10 February 2027
10:30
Scorecard

Auckland	v	Central Districts

Match23
10 February 2027
10:30
Scorecard

Northern Districts	v	Canterbury

Match 24
10 February 2027
10:30
Scorecard

Otago	v	Wellington

=== Round 9 ===
Match 25
13 February 2027
10:30
Scorecard

Northern Districts	v	Central Districts

Match 26
13 February 2027
10:30
Scorecard

Canterbury	v	Wellington

Match27
13 February 2027
10:30
Scorecard

Otago	v	Auckland

=== Round 10 ===
Match 28
16 February 2027
10:30
Scorecard

Auckland	v	Northern Districts

Match 29
16 February 2027
10:30
Scorecard

Wellington	v	Central Districts

Match 30
16 February 2027
10:30
Scorecard

Canterbury	v	Otago

== Finals ==
Elimination Final	Grand Final
	1
2	EF
3
