= 2023–24 Super Smash =

2023–24 Super Smash may refer to:

- 2023–24 Super Smash (men's cricket)
- 2023–24 Super Smash (women's cricket)
