= 2023–24 Super Smash (men's cricket) =

New Zealand Cricket tournament

2023–24 Men's Super Smash
- Dates: 19 December 2023 – 28 January 2024
- Administrator: New Zealand Cricket
- Cricket format: Twenty20
- Tournament format(s): Double round-robin and Finals
- Champions: Auckland Aces (5th title)
- Runners-up: Canterbury Kings
- Participants: 6
- Matches: 32
- Most runs: Henry Nicholls (317)
- Most wickets: Danru Ferns (18)
- Official website: Super Smash

The 2023–24 Super Smash was the 19th season of the men's Super Smash Twenty20 cricket competition played in New Zealand. It took place between 19 December 2023 and 28 January 2024. Northern Brave were the defending champions.

Auckland won the competition.

== Competition format ==
Teams played a double round-robin in a group of six, playing 10 matches overall. Matches were played using a Twenty20 format. The top team in the group advanced straight to the final, whilst the second and third placed teams played off in an elimination final.

The group worked on a points system with positions being based on the total points. Points were awarded as follows:

Results	Points
Win	4 points
Tie	2 points
No result	2 points
Loss	0 points

== Points table ==
Pos	Team	Pld	W	L	T	NR	Pts	NRR	Qualification
1	Auckland Aces	10	6	2	0	2	28	1.247	Advances to Grand Final
2	Canterbury Kings	10	5	3	0	2	24	0.632	Advances to Elimination Final
3	Wellington Firebirds	10	5	4	0	1	22	0.713	Advances to Elimination Final
4	Central Stags	10	4	3	1	2	22	0.337	
5	Otago Volts	10	2	5	1	2	14	−1.675	
6	Northern Brave	10	2	7	0	1	10	−1.226	

Source: Dream11 Super Smash ESPNCricinfo

== Fixtures ==
=== Round-robin ===
19 December 2023
Scorecard

Auckland Aces; 185/5 (20 overs)	v	Canterbury Kings; 158 (17.5 overs)
Robert O'Donnell 54* (38); Michael Rippon 2/27 (4 overs)		Mitchell Hay 43 (25); James Neesham 3/26 (3.5 overs)

Auckland Aces won by 27 runs
Eden Park, Auckland
Umpires: Wayne Knights and Damian Morrow
Player of the match: Danru Ferns (Auckland Aces)

- Canterbury Kings won the toss and elected to field.
- Nikith Perera (Auckland Aces) and Bevon Jacobs (Canterbury Kings) both made their T20 debuts.

21 December 2023 (D/N)
Scorecard

Wellington Firebirds; 234/5 (20 overs)	v	Otago Volts; 160 (16.5 overs)
Tim Robinson 139 (64); Travis Muller 1/16 (3 overs)		Jake Gibson 56 (31); Peter Younghusband 3/33 (4 overs)

Wellington Firebirds won by 74 runs
Basin Reserve, Wellington
Umpires: Cory Black and Tim Parlane
Player of the match: Tim Robinson (Wellington Firebirds)

- Wellington Firebirds won the toss and elected to bat.
- Jesse Tashkoff, Muhammad Abbas (Wellington Firebirds) and Ollie White (Otago Volts) all made their T20 debuts.

22 December 2023 (D/N)
Scorecard

Northern Brave; 196/9 (20 Overs)	v	Central Stags; 141 (19.5 Overs)
Jeet Raval 52 (29); Ajaz Patel 3/35 (4)		Curtis Heaphy 31 (34); Scott Kuggeleijn 2/17 (3)

Northern Brave won by 55 runs
Seddon Park, Hamilton
Umpires: Kim Cotton and Wayne Knights
Player of the match: Tim Seifert (Northern Brave)

- Central Districts won the toss and elected to field.
- Curtis Heaphy (Central Stags) made his T20 debut.

24 December 2023
Scorecard

Wellington Firebirds	v	Auckland Aces

Match abandoned
Basin Reserve, Wellington
Umpires: John Dempsey and Tim Parlane

- No toss
- No play was possible due to rain

26 December 2023 (D/N)
Scorecard

Canterbury Kings; 2/0 (0.3 over)	v	Otago Volts
Henry Nicholls 1* (1)

No result
Hagley Oval, Christchurch
Umpires: Cory Black and Kannan Jagannathan

- Otago Volts won the toss and elected to field.
- Rain prevented any further play.

27 December 2023 (D/N)
Scorecard

Central Stags; 206/5 (20 overs)	v	Northern Brave; 150 (19.2 overs)
Doug Bracewell 93* (33); Scott Kuggeleijn 2/20 (4 overs)		Scott Kuggeleijn 36 (16); Jayden Lennox 4/15 (4 overs)

Central Stags won by 56 runs
Fitzherbert Park, Palmerston North
Umpires: Tim Parlane and Vinit Mahna
Player of the match: Doug Bracewell (Central Stags)

- Northern Brave won the toss and elected to field.

27 December 2023 (D/N)
Scorecard

Otago Volts; 47 (12.4 overs)	v	Wellington Firebirds; 53/1 (4.3 overs)
Matthew Bacon 9* (14); Nathan Smith 4/5 (4 overs)		Tim Robinson 30 (16); Matthew Bacon 1/1 (0.4 over)

Wellington Firebirds won by 9 wickets
Molyneux Park, Alexandra
Umpires: John Dempsey and Kannan Jagannathan
Player of the match: Nathan Smith (Wellington Firebirds)

- Otago Volts won the toss and elected to bat.

29 December 2023 (D/N)
Scorecard

Central Stags	v	Auckland Aces

Match abandoned
Pukekura Park, New Plymouth
Umpires: Greg Pennell and Derek Walker

- No toss
- No play was possible due to rain.

30 December 2023 (D/N)
Scorecard

Canterbury Kings; 185/4 (20 overs)	v	Central Stags; 142/8 (19 overs)
Cole McConchie 79* (47); Bevan Small 3/46 (4 overs)		Dane Cleaver 47 (36); Michael Rae 2/25 (4 overs)

Canterbury Kings won by 33 runs (DLS method)
Pukekura Park, New Plymouth
Umpires: Cory Black and Greg Pennell
Player of the match: Cole McConchie (Canterbury Kings)

- Central Stags won the toss and elected to field.
- Central Stags were set a revised target of 176 runs from 19 overs.

1 January 2024 (D/N)
Scorecard

Auckland Aces; 151/9 (20 overs)	v	Otago Volts; 154/7 (19.4 overs)
Robert O'Donnell 35 (38); Jake Gibson 3/26 (4 overs)		Dean Foxcroft 51 (39); Lousi Delport 3/16 (4 overs)

Otago Volts won by 3 wickets
Molyneux Park, Alexandra
Umpires: Pete Pasco and Derek Walker
Player of the match: Travis Muller (Otago Volts)

- Otago Volts won the toss and elected to field.

2 January 2024 (D/N)
Scorecard

Wellington Firebirds; 177/8 (20 overs)	v	Northern Brave; 154/8 (20 overs)
Jesse Tashkoff 22 (14); Neil Wagner 3/17 (4 overs)		Jeet Raval 62 (42); Peter Younghusband 3/21 (4 overs)

Wellington Firebirds won by 23 runs
Bay Oval, Mount Maunganui
Umpires: John Dempsey and Tim Parlane
Player of the match: Tom Blundell (Wellington Firebirds)

- Wellington Firebirds won the toss and elected to bat.

3 January 2024 (D/N)
Scorecard

Otago Volts; 171/5 (20 overs)	v	Canterbury Kings; 175/6 (18.5 overs)
Hamish Rutherford 52 (39); Zakary Foulkes 3/33 (4 overs)		Henry Nicholls 59 (33); Travis Muller 2/28 (3 overs)

Canterbury Kings won by 4 wickets
Molyneux Park, Alexandra
Umpires: Shaun Haig and Pete Pasco
Player of the match: Henry Nicholls (Canterbury Kings)

- Otago Volts won the toss and elected to bat.

4 January 2024 (D/N)
Scorecard

Auckland Aces; 192/6 (20 overs)	v	Wellington Firebirds; 139 (18.3 overs)
Martin Guptill 85* (52); Ben Sears 2/32 (3 overs)		Muhammad Abbas 32 (38); Danru Ferns 3/26 (4 overs)

Auckland Aces won by 53 runs
Eden Park, Auckland
Umpires: Tim Parlane and Wayne Knights
Player of the match: Martin Guptill (Auckland Aces)

- Wellington Firebirds won the toss and elected to field.

5 January 2024 (D/N)
Scorecard

Canterbury Kings; 21/4 (4.5 overs)	v	Central Stags
Bayley Wiggins 8 (8); Matt Henry 2/11 (2.5 oversO

No result
Hagley Oval, Christchurch
Umpires: Billy Bowden and Kim Cotton

- Canterbury Kings won the toss and elected to field.
- Rain prevented any further play.

6 January 2024 (D/N)
Scorecard

Northern Brave; 128 (18.3 overs)	v	Otago Volts; 132/2 (17 overs)
Mitchell Santner 49 (34); Jacob Duffy 4/19 (3.3 overs)		Dean Foxcroft 55* (48); Neil Wagner 1/23 (3 overs)

Otago Volts won by 8 wickets
Seddon Park, Hamilton
Umpires: Chris Brown and Derek Walker
Player of the match: Glenn Phillips (Otago Volts)

- Northern Brave won the toss and elected to bat.

7 January 2024 (D/N)
Scorecard

Canterbury Kings; 140/5 (20 overs)	v	Auckland Aces; 141/2 (15.2 overs)
Daryl Mitchell 57* (50); Louis Delport 2/20 (4 overs)		Finn Allen 78* (46); Zakary Foulkes 1/13 (2.2 overs)

Auckland Aces won by 8 wickets
Hagley Oval, Christchurch
Umpires: Kim Cotton and Kannan Jagannathan
Player of the match: Finn Allen (Auckland Aces)

- Auckland Aces won the toss and elected to field.

8 January 2024 (D/N)
Scorecard

Central Stags; 158/7 (20 overs)	v	Wellington Firebirds; 160/6 (19.1 overs)
Will Young 50 (33); Logan van Beek 3/24 (4 overs)		Muhammad Abbas 72 (38); Bevan Small 4/22 (4 overs)

Wellington Firebirds won by 4 wickets
McLean Park, Napier
Umpires: Wayne Knights and Tim Parlane
Player of the match: Muhammad Abbas (Wellington Firebirds)

- Central Stags won the toss and elected to bat.

9 January 2024 (D/N)
Scorecard

Canterbury Kings; 202/3 (20 overs)	v	Northern Brave; 169/9 (20 overs)
Henry Nicholls 76* (50); Henry Cooper 1/21 (3 overs)		Katene Clarke 30 (29); Michael Rae 3/44 (4 overs)

Canterbury Kings won by 33 runs
Hagley Oval, Christchurch
Umpires: Chris Brown and Shaun Haig
Player of the match: Mitchell Hay (Canterbury Kings)

- Northern Brave won the toss and elected to field.

10 January 2024 (D/N)
Scorecard

Central Stags; 187/5 (20 overs)	v	Otago Volts; 135 (18 overs)
Will Young 101* (63); Andrew Hazeldine 1/30 (4 overs)		Max Chu 34 (20); Ajaz Patel 4/24 (4 overs)

Central Stags won by 52 runs
McLean Park, Napier
Umpires: Cory Black and Derek Walker
Player of the match: Will Young (Central Stags)

- Otago Volts won the toss and elected to field.

11 January 2024
Scorecard

Wellington Firebirds; 184/5 (20 overs)	v	Canterbury Kings; 163/7 (20 overs)
Tim Robinson 86 (46); Angus McKenzie 3/15 (3 overs)		Tom Latham 44 (34); Michael Bracewell 2/25 (4 overs)

Wellington Firebirds won by 21 runs
Hagley Oval, Christchurch
Umpires: John Dempsey and Tim Parlane
Player of the match: Tim Robinson (Wellington Firebirds)

- Canterbury Kings won the toss and elected to field.

12 January 2024 (D/N)
Scorecard

Northern Brave; 121 (19 overs)	v	Auckland Aces; 127/2 (16.3 overs)
Joe Carter 48 (39); Lockie Ferguson 4/14 (4 overs)		Sean Solia 67* (42); Kris Clarke 1/22 (3 overs)

Auckland Aces won by 8 wickets
Bay Oval, Mount Maunganui
Umpires: Billy Bowden and Greg Pennell
Player of the match: Lockie Ferguson (Auckland Aces)

- Northern Brave won the toss and elected to bat.

13 January 2024 (D/N)
Scorecard

Wellington Firebirds; 147/8 (20 overs)	v	Central Stags; 148/4 (16.5 overs)
Logan van Beek 41* (24); Doug Bracewell 2/21 (4 overs)		Jack Boyle 57 (43); Jesse Tashkoff 1/14 (2 overs)

Central Stags won by 6 wickets
Basin Reserve, Wellington
Umpires: Cory Black and Glen Walkin
Player of the match: Doug Bracewell (Central Stags)

- Wellington Firebirds won the toss and elected to bat.

14 January 2024
Scorecard

Otago Volts; 138 (19.3 overs)	v	Auckland Aces; 139/3 (17.5 overs)
Dean Foxcroft 46* (48); Jock McKenzie 3/31 (4 overs)		Cam Fletcher 74* (51); Jacob Duffy 1/15 (3.5 overs)

Auckland Aces won by 7 wickets
Eden Park, Auckland
Umpires: Billy Bowden and Tim Parlane
Player of the match: Cam Fletcher (Auckland Aces)

- Otago Volts won the toss and elected to bat.
- Jock McKenzie (Auckland Aces) made his T20 debut.

15 January 2024 (D/N)
Scorecard

Wellington Firebirds; 102 (18.3 overs)	v	Northern Brave; 105/3 (15.3 overs)
Nathan Smith 26 (21); Matthew Fisher 2/12 (2 overs)		Jeet Raval 32 (28); Nathan Smith 1/16 (4 overs)

Northern Brave won by 7 wickets
Basin Reserve, Wellington
Umpires: Cory Black and Derek Walker
Player of the match: Scott Kuggeleijn (Northern Brave)

- Northern Brave won the toss and elected to field.

16 January 2024 (D/N)
Scorecard

Central Stags; 173/5 (20 overs)	v	Auckland Aces; 158/9 (20 overs)
Dane Cleaver 87* (49); Ben Lister 2/22 (4 overs)		William O'Donnell 45 (26); Bevan Small 3/25 (4 overs)

Central Stags won by 15 runs
Eden Park, Auckland
Umpires: Damian Morrow and Tim Parlane
Player of the match: Dane Cleaver (Central Stags)

- Auckland Aces won the toss and elected to field.

18 January 2024 (D/N)
Scorecard

Northern Brave; 228/6 (20 overs)	v	Canterbury Kings; 138/7 (20 overs)
Chad Bowes 85 (43); Brett Hampton 2/61 (4 overs)		Tim Pringle 38* (32); William O'Rourke 4/23 (4 overs)

Canterbury won by 90 runs
Seddon Park, Hamilton
Umpires: John Dempsey and Glen Walklin
Player of the match: William O'Rourke (Canterbury Kings)

- Northern Brave won the toss and elected to field.
- Flynn McGregor-Sumpter (Northern Brave) made his T20 debut.

19 January 2024 (D/N)
Scorecard

Otago Volts; 139/5 (20 overs)	v	Central Stags; 139/8 (20 overs)
Dean Foxcroft 42 (32); Jayden Lennox 2/13 (3 overs)		Tom Bruce 63 (44); Jacob Duffy 2/14 (4 overs)

Match tied
University Oval, Dunedin
Umpires: Pete Pasco and Tim Parlane
Player of the match: Tom Bruce (Central Stags)

- Central Stags won the toss and elected to field.
- Jamal Todd (Otago Volts) made his T20 debut.

20 January 2024 (D/N)
Scorecard

Auckland Aces; 181/4 (20 overs)	v	Northern Brave; 137/10(19.5 Overs)
Robert O'Donnell 47 (33); Tim Pringle 2/23 (4 overs)		Katene Clarke 32 (27); Danru Ferns 3/27 (4 overs)

Auckland Aces won by 44 runs
Eden Park, Auckland
Umpires: Billy Bowden and Damian Morrow
Player of the match: Louis Delport (Auckland Aces)

- Northern Brave won the toss and elected to field.

22 January 2024 (D/N)
Scorecard

Canterbury Kings; 178/4 (20 overs)	v	Wellington Firebirds; 160/9 (20 overs)
Tom Latham 60 (49); Logan van Beek 2/21 (2 overs)		Gareth Severin 41 (36); Zakary Foulkes 2/23 (4)

Canterbury Kings won by 18 runs
Basin Reserve, Wellington
Umpires: John Dempsey and Pete Pasco
Player of the match: Henry Nicholls (Canterbury Kings)

- Wellington Firebirds won the toss and elected to field.
- Henry Nicholls (Canterbury Kings) made his T20 debut.

23 January 2024 (D/N)
Scorecard

Northern Brave; 36/5 (7.2 overs)	v	Otago Volts
Peter Bocock 10 (9); Andrew Hazeldine 3/20 (4)

No result
University Oval, Dunedin
Umpires: Derek Walker and Tim Parlane

- Otago Volts won the toss and elected to field.
- Rain prevented any further play.

== Finals ==
=== Bracket ===
Elimination Final			Grand Final
			1	Auckland Aces	Rainout (NR)
2	Canterbury Kings	177/6 (20 overs)	EFW	Canterbury Kings	133/2 (14.2 overs)
3	Wellington Firebirds	173/7 (20 overs)

=== Elimination Final ===
26 January 2023
Scorecard

Wellington Firebirds; 173/7 (20 overs)	v	Canterbury Kings; 177/6 (20 overs)
Michael Bracewell 54* (24); Zakary Foulkes 3/31 (4 overs)		Cole McConchie 53 (38); Ben Sears 2/23 (4 overs)

Canterbury Kings won by 4 wickets
Seddon Park, Hamilton
Umpires: Chris Brown and Wayne Knights
Player of the match: Matt Henry (Canterbury Kings)

- Wellington Firebirds won the toss and elected to bat.

=== Grand Final ===
28 January 2024 (D/N)
Scorecard

Canterbury Kings; 133/2 (14.2 overs)	v	Auckland Aces
Tom Latham 58* (33); Ben Lister 1/9 (2 overs)

Match abandoned
Eden Park, Auckland
Umpires: Kim Cotton and Shaun Haig

- Auckland Aces won the 2023/24 Super Smash due to finishing at the top of the table.

== Statistics ==
=== Most runs ===
Player	Team	Innings	Runs
Henry Nicholls	Canterbury Kings	10	317
Tim Robinson	Wellington Firebirds	6	298
Dane Cleaver	Central Stags	9	281
Nick Kelly	Wellington Firebirds	10	245
Tom Latham	Canterbury Kings	7	243

- Source: ESPN Cricinfo

=== Most wickets ===
Player	Team	Matches	Wickets
Danru Ferns	Auckland Aces	9	18
Bevan Small	Central Stags	9	16
Logan van Beek	Wellington Firebirds	10	15
Ben Lister	Auckland Aces	9	14
Zakary Foulkes	Canterbury Kings	12	14

- Source: ESPN Cricinfo
