= Ford Trophy =

Domestic One Day Cricket Competition

The Ford Trophy
- Countries: New Zealand
- Administrator: New Zealand Cricket
- Format: List A
- First edition: 1971–72
- Latest edition: 2025–26
- Next edition: 2026–27
- Tournament format: Round-robin, preliminary finals and final
- Number of teams: 6
- Current champion: Central Districts (8th title)
- Most successful: Canterbury (17 titles)
- TV: NZ Cricket Youtube (all matches including final)
- Website: blackcaps.co.nz/domestic/the-ford-trophy

The Ford Trophy is the main domestic List A limited overs cricket competition in New Zealand. Previous sponsor State Insurance did not renew naming rights in 2009, resulting in the competition being renamed the New Zealand Cricket one-day competition. The competition was renamed the Ford Trophy following a partnership between New Zealand Cricket and Ford Motor Company in 2011.

== Tournament name ==
Since its commencement in 1971/72, the competition has had several sponsors, each one exercising its naming rights. The competition has been known as:

- New Zealand Motor Corporation Knock-Out – from 1971–72 to 1976–77
- Gillette Cup – from 1977–78 to 1978–79
- National Knock-Out – from 1979 to 1980
- Shell Cup – from 1980–81 to 2000–01
- State Shield – from 2001–02 to 2008–09
- New Zealand One-Day Cricket Competition – from 2009–10 to 2010–11
- The Ford Trophy – from 2011–12 to present

== Format ==
Between 1971–72 and 1979–80, the competition was played on a knock-out basis with a preliminary round, semi-finals and a final. From 1980–81 to 1984–85 the competition was played in a league format with all six teams playing each other once and the top two teams playing off in a final. Between 1985–86 and 1988–89, the side on top of the league after a single round-robin were declared champions. Semi-Finals and Finals were re-introduced from 1989 to 1990 onwards. From 1993–to 94 teams played each other home and away (10 matches) in the league format. From the 2009/10 season onward teams play each other once (five games) followed by three randomly selected teams a second time, forming an eight-game round-robin.

Games in the competition consist of 50 6-ball overs. The competition was originally 40 8-ball overs per innings until 1979–80 when overs throughout the world were standardized to 6 balls.

== Teams ==
Team	Last win	Wins
Canterbury	2024–25	17
Auckland	2021–22	13
Central Districts	2025–26	8
Wellington	2018–19	8
Northern Districts	2009–10	7
Otago	2007–08	2

== Winners ==
Season	Team
1971–72	Canterbury
1972–73	Auckland
1973–74	Wellington
1974–75	Wellington
1975–76	Canterbury
1976–77	Canterbury
1977–78	Canterbury
1978–79	Auckland
1979–80	Northern Districts
1980–81	Auckland
1981–82	Wellington
1982–83	Auckland
1983–84	Auckland
1984–85	Central Districts
1985–86	Canterbury
1986–87	Auckland
1987–88	Otago
1988–89	Wellington
1989–90	Auckland
1990–91	Wellington
1991–92	Canterbury
1992–93	Canterbury
1993–94	Canterbury
1994–95	Northern Districts
1995–96	Canterbury
1996–97	Canterbury
1997–98	Northern Districts
1998–99	Canterbury
1999-00	Canterbury
2000–01	Central Districts
2001–02	Wellington
2002–03	Northern Districts
2003–04	Central Districts
2004–05	Northern Districts
2005–06	Canterbury
2006–07	Auckland
2007–08	Otago
2008–09	Northern Districts
2009–10	Northern Districts
2010–11	Auckland
2011–12	Central Districts
2012–13	Auckland
2013–14	Wellington
2014–15	Central Districts
2015–16	Central Districts
2016–17	Canterbury
2017–18	Auckland
2018–19	Wellington
2019–20	Auckland
2020–21	Canterbury
2021–22	Auckland
2022–23	Central Districts
2023–24	Canterbury
2024–25	Canterbury
2025–26	Central Districts

== See also ==
- Plunket Shield
- Hallyburton Johnstone Shield
- Men's Super Smash
- Women's Super Smash
