= Michael Sclanders =

South African cricketer (born 2000)

Personal information
- Born: 30 March 2000 (age 26)

Domestic team information
- Years: Team
- 2021/22: KwaZulu-Natal Inland
- Source: Cricinfo, 29 October 2021

Michael Sclanders (born 30 March 2000) is a South African cricketer. He made his first-class debut on 29 October 2021, for KwaZulu-Natal Inland in the 2021–22 CSA 4-Day Series. He made his List A debut on 18 March 2022, for KwaZulu-Natal Inland in the 2021–22 CSA One-Day Cup.
