= Jesse Tashkoff =

New Zealand cricketer

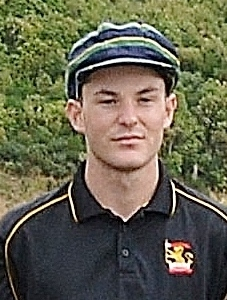

Personal information
- Full name: Jesse Michael Tashkoff
- Born: 7 November 2000 (age 26); Lower Hutt, New Zealand
- Batting: Right-handed
- Bowling: Slow left-arm orthodox
- Role: All-rounder

Domestic team information
- Years: Team
- 2022/23–present: Wellington (squad no. 41)

Career statistics
Competition	FC	LA	T20
Matches	2	4	13
Runs scored	65	86	198
Batting average	16.25	21.50	19.80
100s/50s	0/0	0/1	0/1
Top score	28	77	52
Balls bowled	132	102	72
Wickets	2	1	2
Bowling average	51.50	97.00	59.50
5 wickets in innings	0	0	0
10 wickets in match	0	–	–
Best bowling	2/80	1/47	1/14
Catches/stumpings	0/–	2/–	5/–
- Source: ESPNcricinfo, 24 January 2025

Jesse Michael Tashkoff (born 7 November 2000) is a New Zealand cricketer who plays for Wellington. He made his first-class debut for Wellington against Canterbury on 21 March 2023. Prior to his senior debut, Tashkoff was captain of the New Zealand under-19s in the 2020 Under-19 Cricket World Cup. He received recognition during the tournament for sportsmanship after assisting Kirk McKenzie off the pitch after the batter was injured in the quarter-final.
