= Llew Johnson =

New Zealand cricketer (born 2000)

Personal information
- Full name: Llewellyn Cullen Johnson
- Born: 1 February 2000 (age 26); Timaru, South Canterbury, New Zealand
- Batting: Right-handed
- Role: Wicket-keeper

Domestic team information
- Years: Team
- 2015/16–2020/21: North Otago
- 2017/18–: Otago
- T20 debut: 2 January 2018 Otago v Northern Districts
- LA debut: 21 December 2021 Otago v Wellington

Career statistics
Competition	FC	LA	T20
Matches	9	30	46
Runs scored	334	728	629
Batting average	23.85	30.33	16.12
100s/50s	0/1	1/4	0/2
Top score	80*	115	72
Catches/stumpings	11/–	14/–	17/–
- Source: CricInfo, 9 April 2025

Llewellyn Cullen Johnson (born 1 February 2000) is a New Zealand cricketer. He made his Twenty20 debut for Otago in the 2017–18 Super Smash on 2 January 2018. He made his List A debut on 21 December 2021, for Otago in the 2021–22 Ford Trophy. He made his first-class debut on 15 November 2023, for Otago in 2023–24 Plunket Shield season.
