= Fraser Sheat =

New Zealand cricketer (born 1998)

Personal information
- Full name: Fraser William Sheat
- Born: 29 April 1998 (age 28); Christchurch, Canterbury, New Zealand
- Relatives: Frank Rapley (grandfather)

Domestic team information
- Years: Team
- 2017/18–: Canterbury
- 2024: Glamorgan
- 2026: Nottinghamshire

Career statistics
Competition	FC	LA	T20
Matches	54	29	13
Runs scored	951	88	6
Batting average	21.13	22.00	3.00
100s/50s	0/3	0/0	0/0
Top score	61*	35*	3*
Balls bowled	8,989	1,326	237
Wickets	156	40	11
Bowling average	27.81	25.50	28.18
5 wickets in innings	3	0	0
10 wickets in match	0	0	0
Best bowling	5/25	3/22	3/13
Catches/stumpings	25/–	8/–	5/–
- Source: Cricinfo, 14 September 2026

Fraser William Sheat (born 29 April 1998) is a New Zealand cricketer. He made his first-class debut for Canterbury in the 2017–18 Plunket Shield season on 23 October 2017. He made his List A debut for Canterbury in the 2017–18 Ford Trophy on 3 December 2017.

In June 2020, he was offered a contract by Canterbury ahead of the 2020–21 domestic cricket season. In October 2020, in the second round of the 2020–21 Plunket Shield season, Sheat took his first five-wicket haul in first-class cricket. He made his Twenty20 debut on 3 January 2021, for Canterbury in the 2020–21 Super Smash.

In August 2026, Sheat signed a short-term contract with Nottinghamshire for the final five matches of that year's County Championship season.
