= Jock McKenzie (sportsperson, born 2001) =

New Zealand rugby union player and cricketer

- Full name: Jock James McKenzie
- Born: 9 November 2001 (age 25) Auckland, New Zealand
- School: Westlake Boys High School

Rugby union career
- Position: Fly-half / Fullback
- Current team: Auckland, Blues
Senior career
| Years | Team | Apps | (Points) |
| 2021– | Auckland | 0 | (0) |
| 2022– | Blues | 3 | (3) |
- Correct as of 29 March 2022

Jock McKenzie
Cricket information
- Batting: Right-handed
- Bowling: Right-arm fast-medium
- Role: Bowler

Domestic team information
- Years: Team
- 2023/24: Auckland
- T20 debut: 14 January 2024 Auckland v Otago
- FC debut: 29 February 2024 Auckland v Otago

Career statistics
| Competition | FC | LA | T20 |
|---|---|---|---|
| Matches | 4 | 10 | 6 |
| Runs scored | 246 | 93 | 38 |
| Batting average | 41.00 | 18.6 | 12.66 |
| 100s/50s | 0/1 | 0/1 | 0/0 |
| Top score | 74* | 66 | 16 |
| Balls bowled | 407 | 449 | 143 |
| Wickets | 3 | 10 | 7 |
| Bowling average | 66.66 | 41.40 | 20.42 |
| 5 wickets in innings | 0 | 0 | 0 |
| 10 wickets in match | 0 | 0 | 0 |
| Best bowling | 2/41 | 2/35 | 3/31 |
| Catches/stumpings | 1/– | 2/– | 5/– |
- Source: ESPNcricinfo, 7 January 2025

Jock James McKenzie (born 9 November 2001) is a New Zealand rugby union player and cricketer who plays for the Blues in Super Rugby and the Auckland in top-class cricket.

His rugby playing position is fly-half or fullback. He was named in the Blues squad for the rescheduled Round 1 of the 2022 Super Rugby Pacific season. He made his debut in the same match, coming on as a replacement. He was also named in the Auckland squad for the 2021 Bunnings NPC, but didn't make an appearance.

His brother Angus currently plays cricket for Canterbury, having also previously represented Otago.
