= Liam Dudding =

New Zealand cricketer (born 1994)

Personal information
- Full name: Liam Raymond Dudding
- Born: 13 June 1994 (age 32); Hamilton, New Zealand
- Batting: Right-handed
- Bowling: Right-arm medium-fast
- Role: Bowler

Domestic team information
- Years: Team
- 2015/16–2023/24: Central Districts
- 2024/25–: Wellington

Career statistics
Competition	FC	LA	T20
Matches	19	18	2
Runs scored	153	48	–
Batting average	8.05	9.60	–
100s/50s	0/0	0/0	–
Top score	29	19*	–
Balls bowled	3,066	731	30
Wickets	74	24	1
Bowling average	24.06	30.25	51.00
5 wickets in innings	2	0	0
10 wickets in match	0	0	0
Best bowling	5/32	3/42	1/24
Catches/stumpings	5/–	1/–	0/–
- Source: Cricinfo, 29 October 2025

Liam Raymond Dudding (born 13 June 1994) is a New Zealand cricketer. He made his first-class debut for Central Districts on 15 March 2016 in the 2015–16 Plunket Shield. He made his List A debut for Central Districts on 25 January 2017 in the 2016–17 Ford Trophy.

Dudding was educated at St John's College, Hastings. An opening bowler, he has played Hawke Cup cricket for Hawke's Bay since 2015. He became a full-time contracted player for Central Districts in July 2022. His best first-class bowling figures are 5 for 65 and 3 for 28 in the Plunket Shield match against Wellington in November 2022.
