= Peter Younghusband =

New Zealand cricketer (born 1990)

Personal information
- Born: 17 February 1990 (age 36); Harare, Zimbabwe
- Batting: Right-handed
- Bowling: Right-arm leg break

Domestic team information
- Years: Team
- 2015–present: Wellington (squad no. 17)

Career statistics
Competition	FC	LA	T20
Matches	37	70	57
Runs scored	1,338	666	154
Batting average	25.73	20.18	11.00
100s/50s	0/7	0/2	0/0
Top score	97	83	23*
Balls bowled	5,343	3,125	1,061
Wickets	86	71	52
Bowling average	35.31	38.25	24.26
5 wickets in innings	3	1	0
10 wickets in match	1	0	0
Best bowling	8/127	5/42	3/19
Catches/stumpings	43/–	29/–	29/–
- Source: ESPNcricinfo, 31 December 2025

Peter Younghusband (born 17 February 1990) is a New Zealand cricketer. He made his List A debut for Wellington on 21 January 2015 in the 2014–15 Ford Trophy. He made his Twenty20 debut for Wellington on 30 December 2016 in the 2016–17 Super Smash. He made his first-class debut for Wellington on 25 February 2017 in the 2016–17 Plunket Shield season.

In June 2018, he was awarded a contract with Wellington for the 2018–19 season. In June 2020, he was offered a contract by Wellington ahead of the 2020–21 domestic cricket season. Noted for his excellent fielding, He played regularly as a sub fielder for the Blackcaps before beginning his domestic career.

Younghusband was educated at Nelson College from 2005 to 2007.
