= Angus McKenzie (cricketer) =

New Zealand cricketer (born 1998)

Personal information
- Full name: Angus William McKenzie
- Born: 17 July 1998 (age 28); Wellington, New Zealand
- Batting: Left-handed
- Bowling: Right-arm medium

Domestic team information
- Years: Team
- 2019/20–2021/22: Otago
- 2022/23–: Canterbury

Career statistics
Competition	FC	LA	T20
Matches	23	26	26
Runs scored	426	294	52
Batting average	15.21	18.37	6.5
100s/50s	0/1	0/1	0/0
Top score	53	58	12
Balls bowled	3,539	847	437
Wickets	42	25	28
Bowling average	35.66	27.28	21.78
5 wickets in innings	0	1	0
10 wickets in match	0	0	0
Best bowling	4/64	5/14	4/15
Catches/stumpings	6/–	6/–	9/–
- Source: Cricinfo, 7 January 2025

Angus William McKenzie (born 17 July 1998) is a New Zealand cricketer. He made his List A debut on 5 February 2020, for Otago in the 2019–20 Ford Trophy. He made his first-class debut on 18 March 2021, for Otago in the 2020–21 Plunket Shield season. He made his Twenty20 debut on 12 December 2021, for Otago in the 2021–22 Super Smash.

After playing for Otago for three seasons, McKenzie moved to play for Canterbury ahead of the 2022–23 season.

His brother Jock plays cricket for Auckland, and has also played rugby for Auckland and the Blues.
