= New Zealand cricket team in Bangladesh in 2026 =

International cricket tour

New Zealand men's cricket team in Bangladesh in 2026
	Bangladesh	New Zealand
- Dates: 17 April – 2 May 2026
Captains	Mehidy Miraz (ODIs); Litton Das (T20Is)	Tom Latham (ODIs); Nick Kelly (T20Is)

One Day International series
- Results: Bangladesh won the 3-match series 2–1
Most runs	Najmul Hossain Shanto (155)	Nick Kelly (149); Dean Foxcroft (149)
Most wickets	Nahid Rana (8)	Will O'Rourke (5); Jayden Lennox (5)
- Player of the series: Nahid Rana (Ban)

Twenty20 International series
- Results: 3-match series drawn 1–1
Most runs	Towhid Hridoy (84)	Bevon Jacobs (63)
Most wickets	Shoriful Islam (4)	Josh Clarkson (4)
- Player of the series: Towhid Hridoy (Ban)

The New Zealand cricket team toured Bangladesh in April and May 2026 to play three ODI and three Twenty20 International (T20I). In March 2026, the Bangladesh Cricket Board (BCB) confirmed the fixtures for the tour. However, the match timings of both the series were brought forward to save electricity amid the energy crisis.

Bangladesh won the ODI series by a 2-1 margin, which was their third successive ODI series win at home since October 2025. While the T20I series was drawn by 1-1, as the 2nd T20I washed out.

== Squads ==
Bangladesh		New Zealand	
ODIs	T20Is	ODIs	T20Is
Mehidy Hasan Miraz (c); Najmul Hossain Shanto(vc); Taskin Ahmed; Litton Das (wk); Saif Hassan; Tanzid Hasan Tamim; Afif Hossain; Rishad Hossain; Tawhid Hridoy; Tanvir Islam; Mahidul Islam Ankon (wk); Mustafizur Rahman; Nahid Rana; Soumya Sarkar; Shoriful Islam	Litton Das (c, wk); Saif Hassan(vc); Nasum Ahmed; Parvez Hossain Emon (wk); Mahedi Hasan; Nurul Hasan (wk); Tanzid Hasan Tamim; Rishad Hossain; Shamim Hossain; Tawhid Hridoy; Shoriful Islam; Ripon Mondol; Mohammad Saifuddin; Tanzim Hasan Sakib; Abdul Gaffar Saqlain	Tom Latham (c); Muhammad Abbas; Adithya Ashok; ~~Kristian Clarke~~; Josh Clarkson; Dane Cleaver (wk); Dean Foxcroft; Nick Kelly; Jayden Lennox; Ben Lister; Henry Nicholls; Will O'Rourke; ~~Ben Sears~~; Nathan Smith; Blair Tickner; Will Young	Tom Latham (c); Katene Clarke; ~~Kristian Clarke~~; Josh Clarkson; Dane Cleaver (wk); Matt Fisher; Dean Foxcroft; Bevon Jacobs; Nick Kelly; Jayden Lennox; Ben Lister; Tim Robinson; Ben Sears; Nathan Smith; Ish Sodhi; Blair Tickner

Ahead of the tour Ben Lister was added to the New Zealand's squad as an injury replacement for Kristian Clarke who was ruled out. Ben Sears was also ruled out of the ODI series following his callup to the 2026 Pakistan Super League.

== ODI series ==
=== 1st ODI ===
17 April 2026
11:00 (D/N)
Scorecard

New Zealand; 247/8 (50 overs)	v	Bangladesh; 221 (48.3 overs)
Henry Nicholls 68 (83); Shoriful Islam 2/27 (10 overs)		Saif Hassan 57 (76); Blair Tickner 3/45 (9.3 overs)

New Zealand won by 26 runs
Sher-e-Bangla National Cricket Stadium, Dhaka
Umpires: Tanvir Ahmed (Ban) and Nitin Menon (Ind)
Player of the match: Dean Foxcroft (NZ)

- New Zealand won the toss and elected to bat.

=== 2nd ODI ===
20 April 2026
11:00 (D/N)
Scorecard

New Zealand; 198 (48.4 overs)	v	Bangladesh; 199/4 (35.3 overs)
Nick Kelly 83 (102); Nahid Rana 5/32 (10 overs)		Tanzid Hasan 76 (58); Jayden Lennox 2/36 (9 overs)

Bangladesh won by 6 wickets
Sher-e-Bangla National Cricket Stadium, Dhaka
Umpires: Richard Illingworth (Eng) and Gazi Sohel (Ban)
Player of the match: Nahid Rana (Ban)

- New Zealand won the toss and elected to bat.
- Litton Das (Ban) played his 100th ODI match.

=== 3rd ODI ===
23 April 2026
11:00 (D/N)
Scorecard

Bangladesh; 265/8 (50 overs)	v	New Zealand; 210 (44.5 overs)
Najmul Hossain Shanto 105 (119); Will O'Rourke 3/32 (7 overs)		Dean Foxcroft 75 (72); Mustafizur Rahman 5/43 (9 overs)

Bangladesh won by 55 runs
Bir Shrestho Flight Lieutenant Matiur Rahman Cricket Stadium, Chattogram
Umpires: Masudur Rahman (Ban) and Nitin Menon (Ind)
Player of the match: Najmul Hossain Shanto (Ban)

- New Zealand won the toss and elected to field.

== T20I series ==
=== 1st T20I ===
27 April 2026
14:00
Scorecard

New Zealand; 182/6 (20 overs)	v	Bangladesh; 183/4 (18 overs)
Dane Cleaver 51 (28); Rishad Hossain 2/32 (4 overs)		Tawhid Hridoy 51* (27); Ish Sodhi 2/40 (4 overs)

Bangladesh won by 6 wickets
Bir Shrestho Flight Lieutenant Matiur Rahman Cricket Stadium, Chittagong
Umpires: Morshed Ali Khan (Ban) and Gazi Sohel (Ban)
Player of the match: Tawhid Hridoy (Ban)

- Bangladesh won the toss and elected to field.
- Matt Fisher and Nathan Smith (NZ) both made their T20I debuts.

=== 2nd T20I ===
29 April 2026
14:00
Scorecard

Bangladesh	v	New Zealand

Match abandoned
Bir Shrestho Flight Lieutenant Matiur Rahman Cricket Stadium, Chittagong
Umpires: Tanvir Ahmed (Ban) and Masudur Rahman (Ban)

- No toss.
- No play was possible due to rain.

=== 3rd T20I ===
2 May 2026
14:00
Scorecard

Bangladesh; 102 (14.2 overs)	v	New Zealand; 104/4 (11.4 overs)
Towhid Hridoy 33 (24); Josh Clarkson 3/9 (2 overs)		Bevon Jacobs 62* (31); Shoriful Islam 3/19 (3 overs)

New Zealand won by 6 wickets (DLS method)
Sher-e-Bangla National Cricket Stadium, Dhaka
Umpires: Masudur Rahman (Ban) and Gazi Sohel (Ban)
Player of the match: Bevon Jacobs (NZ)

- New Zealand won the toss and elected to field.
- The match was reduced to 15 overs per side due to rain.
- Jayden Lennox (NZ) made his T20I debut.
