= 2023–24 Ford Trophy =

Cricket tournament

- Dates: 25 November 2023 – 24 February 2024
- Administrator(s): New Zealand Cricket
- Cricket format: List A cricket
- Tournament format(s): Round-robin and Knockout
- Champions: Canterbury (16th title)
- Participants: 6
- Matches: 32
- Most runs: Robert O'Donnell (635)
- Most wickets: Kris Clarke (18)
- Official website: Newzealand Cricket

The 2023–24 Ford Trophy is the 53rd season of The Ford Trophy, the List A cricket tournament that is played in New Zealand. It is the twelfth in a sponsorship deal between New Zealand Cricket and Ford Motor Company. The tournament is being held from 25 November 2023 to 24 February 2024. Central Districts were the defending champions.

Following the completion of matches played on 18 February 2024, Canterbury were the first team to reach the final of the tournament. They were joined by Auckland, who beat Otago in their penultimate group match to secure their berth in the final. In the final, Canterbury beat Auckland by five wickets to win their 16th title.

== Points table ==
| Pos | Team | Pld | W | L | T | NR | Pts | NRR |
|---|---|---|---|---|---|---|---|---|
| 1 | Canterbury | 10 | 5 | 3 | 0 | 2 | 29 | 1.287 |
| 2 | Otago | 10 | 5 | 3 | 0 | 2 | 27 | 0.387 |
| 3 | Auckland | 10 | 6 | 4 | 0 | 0 | 24 | −0.334 |
| 4 | Northern Districts | 10 | 4 | 4 | 0 | 2 | 22 | 0.087 |
| 5 | Central Districts | 10 | 3 | 5 | 0 | 2 | 17 | −0.587 |
| 6 | Wellington | 10 | 2 | 6 | 0 | 2 | 13 | −0.786 |

Updated to match(es) played on 18 February 2024. Source: ESPNcricinfo

Advances to Grand Final
Advance to Elimination Final

== Fixtures ==
25 November 2023
10:30
Scorecard

| Northern Districts; 272/7 (50 overs) | v | Central Districts; 244/8 (50 overs) |
| Jeet Raval 96 (103); Bevan Small 2/69 (10 overs) | | Dane Cleaver 93 (101); Kris Clarke 2/33 (10 overs) |

Northern Districts won by 28 runs
Saxton Oval, Nelson
Umpires: John Dempsey and Wayne Knights

- Northern Districts won the toss and elected to bat.
- Points: Northern Districts 4, Central Districts 0

25 November 2023
10:30
Scorecard

| Canterbury; 220 (49.2 overs) | v | Wellington; 157 (32 overs) |
| Mitchell Hay 75 (91); Adam Milne 5/24 (9.2 overs) | | Tim Robinson 51 (46); Cameron Paul 3/17 (6 overs) |

Canterbury won by 63 runs
Hagley Oval, Christchurch
Umpires: Chris Brown and Damian Morrow

- Wellington won the toss and elected to field.
- Points: Canterbury 5, Wellington 0
- Bevon Jacobs, Cameron Paul, Dylan Hunter (Canterbury) and Gareth Severin (Wellington) all made their List A debuts.

25 November 2023
10:30
Scorecard

| Otago; 302/6 (50 overs) | v | Auckland; 260 (44.5 overs) |
| Dale Phillips 107 (99); Adithya Ashok 2/60 (10 overs) | | William O'Donnell 83 (101); Matthew Bacon 5/38 (8.5 overs) |

Otago won by 42 runs
Queens Park, Invercargill
Umpires: Shaun Haig and Tim Parlane

- Auckland won the toss and elected to field.
- Points: Otago 4, Auckland 0

29 November 2023
10:30
Scorecard

| Otago; 268/7 (50 overs) | v | Auckland; 274/3 (46.3 overs) |
| Thorn Parkes 78 (93); Danru Ferns 3/41 (9 overs) | | Finn Allen 168 (110); Jacob Duffy 1/53 (10 overs); Travis Muller 1/53 (10 overs) |

Auckland won by 7 wickets
Eden Park Outer Oval, Auckland
Umpires: Billy Bowden and Wayne Knights

- Otago won the toss and elected to bat.
- Points: Auckland 4, Otago 0

29 November 2023
10:30
Scorecard

| Wellington; 198 (49.4 overs) | v | Northern Districts; 199/4 (32.4 overs) |
| Troy Johnson 57 (102); Scott Kuggeleijn 3/40 (9.4 overs) | | Joe Carter 54 (44); Ben Sears 2/17 (6 overs) |

Northern Districts won by 6 wickets
Seddon Park, Hamilton
Umpires: Shaun Haig and Pete Pasco

- Wellington won the toss and elected to bat.
- Points: Northern Districts 5, Wellington 0

29 November 2023
10:30
Scorecard

| Canterbury; 278 (46.4 overs) | v | Central Districts; 280/6 (48.5 overs) |
| Mitchell Hay 82 (80); Raymond Toole 5/72 (9.4 overs) | | Curtis Heaphy 70 (107); Zak Foulkes 2/53 (9.5 overs) |

Central Districts won by 4 wickets
Pukekura Park, New Plymouth
Umpires: John Dempsey and Tim Parlane

- Central Districts won the toss and elected to field.
- Points: Central Districts 4, Canterbury 0
- Curtis Heaphy (Central Districts) made his List A debut.

3 December 2023
10:30
Scorecard

| Northern Districts | v | Otago |

No result
Seddon Park, Hamilton
Umpires: Wayne Knights and Greg Pennell

- Otago won the toss and elected to field.
- No play was possible due to rain.
- Points: Northern Districts 2, Otago 2

3 December 2023
10:30
Scorecard

| Central Districts | v | Wellington |

Match abandoned without a ball bowled
Fitzherbert Park, Palmerston North
Umpires: Billy Bowden and Pete Pasco

- No play was possible due to rain.
- Points: Central Districts 2, Wellington 2

3 December 2023
10:30
Scorecard

| Canterbury; 250/7 (50 overs) | v | Auckland; 251/5 (49 overs) |
| Michael Rippon 67* (68); Danru Ferns 2/48 (8 overs) | | Robert O'Donnell 70 (91); Cole McConchie 2/44 (9 overs) |

Auckland won by 5 wickets
Hagley Oval, Christchurch
Umpires: Tim Parlane and Glen Walklin

- Canterbury won the toss and elected to bat.
- Points: Auckland 4, Canterbury 0

7 December 2023
10:30
Scorecard

| Auckland; 307/5 (50 overs) | v | Northern Districts; 253 (46.1 overs) |
| Finn Allen 120 (97); Joe Walker 2/56 (9 overs) | | Brett Hampton 67 (54); Sean Solia 2/24 (7 overs) |

Auckland won by 54 runs
Cobham Oval, Whangārei
Umpires: Billy Bowden and Wayne Knights

- Auckland won the toss and elected to bat.
- Points: Auckland 4, Northern Districts 0

7 December 2023
10:30
Scorecard

| Central Districts; 236/9 (50 overs) | v | Otago; 154 (40 overs) |
| William Clark 57* (57); Travis Muller 3/25 (10 overs) | | Max Chu 35 (61); Josh Clarkson 3/37 (8 overs) |

Central Districts won by 82 runs
Pukekura Park, New Plymouth
Umpires: John Dempsey and Neil Louw

- Otago won the toss and elected to field.
- Points: Central Districts 5, Otago 0

7 December 2023
10:30
Scorecard

| Wellington; 247/8 (50 overs) | v | Canterbury; 192 (44 overs) |
| Nick Greenwood 64 (88); William O'Rourke 3/34 (10 overs) | | Chad Bowes 47 (55); Adam Milne 3/23 (9 overs) |

Wellington won by 55 runs
Basin Reserve, Wellington
Umpires: Damian Morrow and Tim Parlane

- Canterbury won the toss and elected to field.
- Points: Wellington 5, Canterbury 0

12 December 2023
10:30
Scorecard

| Canterbury | v | Otago |

Match abandoned without a ball bowled
Queens Park, Invercargill
Umpires: Shaun Haig and Pete Pasco

- No play was possible due to rain.
- Points: Canterbury 2, Otago 2

12 December 2023
10:30
Scorecard

| Central Districts; 185 (49.5 overs) | v | Northern Districts; 189/6 (42.1 overs) |
| Curtis Heaphy 55 (105); Kris Clarke 3/25 (8 overs) | | Joe Carter 48 (48); Raymond Toole 2/26 (8 overs) |

Northern Districts won by 4 wickets
Cobham Oval, Whangārei
Umpires: Damian Morrow and Tim Parlane

- Central Districts won the toss and elected to bat.
- Points: Northern Districts 4, Central Districts 0

13 December 2023
10:30
Scorecard

| Auckland; 295/3 (38.3 overs) | v | Wellington; 266/5 (35 overs) |
| Sean Solia 92 (88); Ben Sears 1/32 (7.3 overs) | | Troy Johnson 97* (86); Ben Lister 2/49 (7 overs) |

Auckland won by 10 runs (DLS method)
Eden Park Outer Oval, Auckland
Umpires: Billy Bowden and Glen Walklin

- Wellington won the toss and elected to field.
- Wellington were set a revised target of 277 runs from 35 overs due to rain.
- Points: Auckland 5, Wellington 0

1 February 2024
10:30
Scorecard

| Northern Districts; 319/6 (50 overs) | v | Auckland; 215 (44.4 overs) |
| Brett Hampton 126* (100); Ben Lister 2/52 (10 overs) | | Cole Briggs 30 (42); Mattew Fisher 5/46 (10 overs) |

Northern Districts won by 104 runs
Eden Park Outer Oval, Auckland
Umpires: Billy Bowden and Wayne Knights

- Auckland won the toss and elected to field.
- Jock McKenzie (Auckland) made his List A debut.
- Brett Hampton (Northern Districts) scored his maiden century in List A cricket.
- Points: Northern Districts 5, Auckland 0

2 February 2024
10:30
Scorecard

| Wellington; 281 (47 overs) | v | Central Districts; 90/0 (19.3 overs) |
| Logan van Beek 136 (99); Josh Clarkson 2/16 (5 overs) | | Curtis Heaphy 45* (70) |

No result
Basin Reserve, Wellington
Umpires: Cory Black and Neil Louw

- The match was reduced to 47 overs per side due to rain.
- Central Districts were set a revised target of 274 runs from 47 overs due to rain.
- No further play was possible due to rain.
- Logan van Beek (Wellington) scored his maiden century in List A cricket.
- Points: Wellington 2, Central Districts 2

2 February 2024
10:30
Scorecard

| Otago; 135 (29.2 overs) | v | Canterbury; 133/2 (19.2 overs) |
| Andrew Hazeldine 41* (36); William O'Rourke 6/20 (9 overs) | | Henry Nicholls 49* (55); Jacob Duffy 1/42 (7 overs) |

Canterbury won by 8 wickets (DLS method)
Rangiora Recreation Ground, Rangiora
Umpires: Kim Cotton and John Dempsey

- Canterbury won the toss and elected to field.
- The match was reduced to 44 overs per side due to rain.
- Jacob Cumming (Otago) made his List A debut.
- Points: Canterbury 5, Otago 0

6 February 2024
10:30
Scorecard

| Canterbury; 287/7 (50 overs) | v | Auckland; 168 (40 overs) |
| Leo Carter 80 (106); Angus Olliver 3/42 (10 overs) | | William O'Donnell 45 (63); Zak Foulkes 3/15 (7 overs) |

Canterbury won by 119 runs
Basin Reserve, Wellington
Umpires: Wayne Knights and Glen Walklin

- Auckland won the toss and elected to field.
- Nikith Perera and Angus Olliver (Auckland) both made their List A debuts.
- Points: Canterbury 5, Auckland 0

6 February 2024
10:30
Scorecard

| Wellington; 330/8 (50 overs) | v | Northern Districts; 285 (49 overs) |
| Nick Kelly 106 (97); Kris Clarke 5/67 (10 overs) | | Henry Cooper 121 (132); Nathan Smith 3/57 (9 overs) |

Wellington won by 45 runs
Basin Reserve, Wellington
Umpires: Kim Cotton and John Dempsey

- Wellington won the toss and elected to bat.
- Jesse Tashkoff (Wellington) made his List A debut.
- Points: Wellington 4, Northern Districts 0

10 February 2024
10:30
Scorecard

| Auckland; 233 (49.1 overs) | v | Central Districts; 234/4 (49.1 overs) |
| George Worker 56 (91); Ajaz Patel 3/31 (10 overs) | | Brad Schmulian 104* (127); Ben Lister 1/29 (10 overs) |

Central Districts won by 6 wickets
McLean Park, Napier
Umpires: Billy Bowden and Kannan Jagannathan

- Auckland won the toss and elected to bat.
- Brad Schmulian (Central Districts) scored his maiden century in List A cricket.
- Points: Central Districts 4, Auckland 0

10 February 2024
10:30
Scorecard

| Otago; 226 (44.4 overs) | v | Wellington; 211 (48.1 overs) |
| Dale Phillips 57 (65); Logan van Beek 3/27 (9 overs) | | Troy Johnson 83 (109); Luke Georgeson 5/37 (10 overs) |

Otago won by 15 runs
Basin Reserve, Wellington
Umpires: Cory Black and John Dempsey

- Wellington won the toss and elected to field.
- Points: Otago 4, Wellington 0

10 February 2024
14:00 (D/N)
Scorecard

| Canterbury; 273 (49.3 overs) | v | Northern Districts; 29/2 (10 overs) |
| Chad Bowes 74 (72); Brett Hampton 3/53 (10 overs) | | Katene Clarke 16 (26); Zak Foulkes 1/12 (5 overs) |

No result
Hagley Oval, Christchurch
Umpires: Tim Parlane and Glen Walklin

- Northern Districts won the toss and elected to field.
- Ewald Schreuder (Northern Districts) made his List A debut.
- Points: Canterbury 2, Northern Districts 2

14 February 2024
10:30
Scorecard

| Wellington; 285/8 (50 overs) | v | Auckland; 289/6 (50 overs) |
| Jesse Tashkoff 77 (55); Jock McKenzie 2/44 (10 overs) | | Robert O'Donnell 115 (110); Nathan Smith 2/38 (10 overs) |

Auckland won by 4 wickets
Basin Reserve, Wellington
Umpires: Wayne Knights and Derek Walker

- Wellington won the toss and elected to bat.
- Points: Auckland 4, Wellington 0

14 February 2024
10:30
Scorecard

| Canterbury; 349/8 (50 overs) | v | Central Districts; 166 (39.2 overs) |
| Henry Nicholls 138 (123); Josh Clarkson 4/60 (9 overs) | | Doug Bracewell 94 (85); Zak Foulkes 3/25 (8 overs) |

Canterbury won by 183 runs
Hagley Oval, Christchurch
Umpires: Chris Brown and Tim Parlane

- Canterbury won the toss and elected to bat.
- Points: Canterbury 5, Central Districts 0

14 February 2024
10:30
Scorecard

| Northern Districts; 184 (48.1 overs) | v | Otago; 187/4 (39.1 overs) |
| Jeet Raval 78 (102); Jacob Duffy 3/32 (10 overs) | | Thorn Parkes 47* (70); Matthew Fisher 3/37 (9 overs) |

Otago won by 6 wickets
John Davies Oval, Queenstown
Umpires: Cory Black and John Dempsey

- Otago won the toss and elected to field.
- Points: Otago 5, Northern Districts 0

18 February 2024
10:30
Scorecard

| Central Districts; 243 (49.4 overs) | v | Auckland; 247/5 (48.5 overs) |
| Brad Schmulian 107 (109); Ben Lister 3/36 (10 overs) | | William O'Donnell 90* (95); Blair Tickner 3/45 (10 overs) |

Auckland won by 5 wickets
Eden Park Outer Oval, Auckland
Umpires: Billy Bowden and Chris Brown

- Auckland won the toss and elected to field.
- Points: Auckland 4, Central Districts 0

18 February 2024
10:30
Scorecard

| Canterbury; 160 (44.5 overs) | v | Northern Districts; 164/2 (36 overs) |
| Joe Carter 56 (82); Fraser Sheat 3/26 (8 overs) | | Henry Nicholls 85* (102); Tim Pringle 2/29 (8 overs) |

Canterbury won by 8 wickets
Bay Oval, Mount Maunganui
Umpires: John Dempsey and Wayne Knights

- Northern Districts won the toss and elected to bat.
- Ben Pomare and Joshua Brown (Northern Districts) both made their List A debuts.
- Points: Canterbury 5, Northern Districts 0

18 February 2024
10:30
Scorecard

| Otago; 57 (22.3 overs) | v | Wellington; 60/2 (9.5 overs) |
| Muhammad Abbas 11 (17); Luke Georgeson 5/11 (6.3 overs) | | Luke Georgeson 27 (25); Nathan Smith 1/12 (4 overs) |

Otago won by 8 wickets
John Davies Oval, Queenstown
Umpires: Shaun Haig and Tim Parlane

- Wellington won the toss and elected to bat.
- Luke Georgeson (Wellington) took his first five-wicket haul in List A cricket.
- Points: Otago 5, Wellington 0

== Finals ==
| Elimination Final | | | Grand Final |
| | | | 1 | Canterbury | 208/5 (37.1 overs) |
| 2 | Otago | 276 (50 overs) | 3 | Auckland | 264/5 (50 overs) |
| 3 | Auckland | 277/6 (48.3 overs) |

=== Elimination Final ===
21 February 2024
10:30
Scorecard

| Otago; 276 (50 overs) | v | Auckland; 277/6 (48.3 overs) |
| Luke Georgeson 120 (150); Danru Ferns 3/42 (8 overs) | | Robert O'Donnell 104 (114); Dean Foxcroft 2/41 (10 overs) |

Auckland won by 4 wickets
University of Otago Oval, Dunedin
Umpires: Cory Black and Billy Bowden

- Auckland won the toss and elected to field.

=== Grand Final ===
24 February 2024
10:30
Scorecard

| Auckland; 264/5 (50 overs) | v | Canterbury; 208/5 (37.1 overs) |
| Robert O'Donnell 74* (80); Zak Foulkes 2/55 (10 overs) | | Tom Latham 64 (82); Ben Lister 2/22 (8 overs) |

Canterbury won by 5 wickets (DLS method)
Hagley Oval, Christchurch
Umpires: Cory Black and John Dempsey

- Canterbury won the toss and elected to field.
- Canterbury were set a revised target of 206 runs in 38 overs due to rain.
