= New Zealand A cricket team in Bangladesh in 2025 =

International cricket tour

| | Bangladesh A | New Zealand A |
- Dates: 5 – 24 May 2025
| Captains | Nurul Hasan | Joe Carter (First-class); Nick Kelly (List A) |

FC series
- Result: New Zealand A won the 2-match series 1–0
| Most runs | Nurul Hasan (182) | Nick Kelly (245) |
| Most wickets | Khaled Ahmed (10) | Jayden Lennox (7) |

LA series
- Result: Bangladesh A won the 3-match series 2–1
| Most runs | Mahidul Islam Ankon (147) | Dale Phillips (113) |
| Most wickets | Tanvir Islam (5); Mosaddek Hossain (5) | Adithya Ashok (4); Kris Clarke (4) |

The New Zealand A cricket team toured Bangladesh in May 2025 to play against the Bangladesh A cricket team. The tour consisted of two first-class matches and three List A cricket matches.

Bangladesh won the List A series 2–1. New Zealand won the first-class series 1–0, with one match drawn.

== Squads ==
| Bangladesh A | | New Zealand A | |
| First-class | List A | First-class | List A |
|---|---|---|---|
| Nurul Hasan (c, wk); Khaled Ahmed; Nasum Ahmed; Yasir Ali; Mahidul Islam Ankon; Parvez Hossain Emon; Anamul Haque; Amite Hasan; Nayeem Hasan; Saif Hassan; Zakir Hasan; Afif Hossain; Ebadot Hossain; Mosaddek Hossain; Shamim Hossain; Shoriful Islam; Tanvir Islam; Mahmudul Hasan Joy; Hasan Murad; Mohammad Naim; Mustafizur Rahman; Rejaur Rahman Raja | Nurul Hasan (c, wk); Yasir Ali; Mahidul Islam Ankon; Parvez Hossain Emon; Nayeem Hasan; Saif Hassan; Anamul Haque; Ebadot Hossain; Mosaddek Hossain; Shamim Hossain; Shoriful Islam; Tanvir Islam; Mohammad Naim; Rejaur Rahman Raja; Mustafizur Rahman | Joe Carter (c); Nick Kelly; Muhammad Abbas; Adi Ashok; Matt Boyle; Kris Clarke; Josh Clarkson; Zak Foulkes; Dean Foxcroft; Mitchell Hay (wk); Curtis Heaphy; Jayden Lennox; Ben Lister; Rhys Mariu; Dale Phillips | Nick Kelly (c); Joe Carter; Muhammad Abbas; Adi Ashok; Matt Boyle; Kris Clarke; Josh Clarkson; Zak Foulkes; Dean Foxcroft; Mitchell Hay (wk); Curtis Heaphy; Jayden Lennox; Ben Lister; Rhys Mariu; Dale Phillips |

== List A series ==
=== 1st Unofficial ODI ===
5 May 2025
09:30
Scorecard

| New Zealand A 147 (34.3 overs) | v | Bangladesh A 149/3 (27.2 overs) |
| Dean Foxcroft 72 (64); Khaled Ahmed 3/27 (7 overs) | | Mahidul Islam Ankon 42* (61); Kris Clarke 2/30 (5 overs) |

Bangladesh A won by 7 wickets
Sylhet International Cricket Stadium, Sylhet
Umpires: Tanvir Ahmed (Ban) and Gazi Sohel (Ban)
Player of the match: Khaled Ahmed (Bangladesh A)

- New Zealand A won the toss and elected to bat.

=== 2nd Unofficial ODI ===
7 May 2025
09:30
Scorecard

| Bangladesh A 344/5 (50 overs) | v | New Zealand A 257 (43.1 overs) |
| Nurul Hasan 112 (101); Kris Clarke 2/70 (10 overs) | | Dale Phillips 79 (54); Mosaddek Hossain 3/50 (10 overs) |

Bangladesh A won by 87 runs
Sylhet International Cricket Stadium, Sylhet
Umpires: Tanvir Ahmed (Ban) and Morshed Ali Khan (Ban)
Player of the match: Nurul Hasan (Bangladesh A)

- New Zealand A won the toss and elected to field.

=== 3rd Unofficial ODI ===
10 May 2025
09:30
Scorecard

| Bangladesh A 226 (47.4 overs) | v | New Zealand A 231/6 (48.2 overs) |
| Nasum Ahmed 67 (97); Adithya Ashok 3/44 (10 overs) | | Dean Foxcroft 36* (43); Nayeem Hasan 2/30 (10 overs) |

New Zealand A won by 4 wickets
Sylhet International Cricket Stadium, Sylhet
Umpires: Morshed Ali Khan (Ban) and Gazi Sohel (Ban)
Player of the match: Dean Foxcroft (New Zealand A)

- New Zealand A won the toss and elected to field.

== First-class series ==
=== 1st Unofficial Test ===
14–17 May 2025
Scorecard

| New Zealand A | v | Bangladesh A |
| 256 (75.2 overs); Mitchell Hay 81 (134); Khaled Ahmed 6/59 (21.2 overs) | | 268 (69.3 overs); Nurul Hasan 107 (88); Josh Clarkson 4/44 (15 overs) |
| 257 (80.1 overs); Nick Kelly 122 (207); Hasan Murad 5/61 (24.1 overs) | | 175 (65.2 overs); Mahidul Islam Ankon 57* (167); Adithya Ashok 5/54 (17 overs) |

New Zealand A won by 70 runs
Sylhet International Cricket Stadium, Sylhet
Umpires: Morshed Ali Khan (Ban) and Masudur Rahman (Ban)
Player of the match: Adithya Ashok (New Zealand A)

- Bangladesh A won the toss and elected to field.

=== 2nd Unofficial Test ===
21–24 May 2025
Scorecard

| Bangladesh A | v | New Zealand A |
| 357 (89.5 overs); Mohammad Naim 82 (94); Ben Lister 3/43 (13 overs) | | 379 (125.2 overs); Nick Kelly 103 (167); Nayeem Hasan 4/102 (44.2 overs) |
| 87/2 (24 overs); Anamul Haque 24 (23); Ben Lister 1/17 (4 overs) |

Match drawn
Sher-e-Bangla National Cricket Stadium, Dhaka
Umpires: Masudur Rahman (Ban) and Gazi Sohel (Ban)
Player of the match: Nick Kelly (New Zealand A)

- Bangladesh A won the toss and elected to bat.
