= New Zealand cricket team in West Indies in 2026 =

International cricket tour

	West Indies	New Zealand
- Dates: 11 – 21 July 2026
Captains	Shai Hope	Mitchell Santner

One Day International series
- Results: New Zealand won the 5-match series 3–2
Most runs	Keacy Carty (194)	Will Young (176)
Most wickets	Gudakesh Motie (9)	Jayden Lennox (14)
- Player of the series: Jayden Lennox (NZ)

The New Zealand cricket team toured West Indies in July 2026 to play the West Indies cricket team in a five match One Day International series. In May 2026, Cricket West Indies (CWI) had confirmed the fixtures for the tour as part of the 2026 home international season.

== Squads ==
West Indies	New Zealand
Shai Hope (c, wk); Ackeem Auguste; John Campbell; Keacy Carty; Roston Chase; Matthew Forde; Justin Greaves; Amir Jangoo (wk); Alzarri Joseph; Shamar Joseph; Vitel Lawes; Gudakesh Motie; Keemo Paul; Sherfane Rutherford; Jayden Seales	Mitchell Santner (c); Michael Bracewell; Mark Chapman; Kristian Clarke; Jacob Duffy; Matthew Fisher; Dean Foxcroft; Mitchell Hay (wk); Nick Kelly; Tom Latham (wk); Jayden Lennox; Ben Lister; Daryl Mitchell; Henry Nicholls; ~~Ben Sears~~; Nathan Smith; Will Young

On 1 July, Ben Sears was ruled out of the series due to an ankle injury, and was replaced by Ben Lister.

== ODI series ==
=== 1st ODI ===
11 July 2026
14:30 (D/N)
Scorecard

New Zealand; 267 (49.5 overs)	v	West Indies; 268/3 (48.5 overs)
Daryl Mitchell 65 (73); Alzarri Joseph 4/41 (8.5 overs)		Keacy Carty 95 (112); Michael Bracewell 1/33 (5 overs)

West Indies won by 7 wickets
Providence Stadium, Georgetown
Umpires: Deighton Butler (WI) and Alex Wharf (Eng)
Player of the match: Keacy Carty (WI)

- West Indies won the toss and elected to field.
- Vitel Lawes (WI) and Matthew Fisher (NZ) both made their ODI debuts.
- This was West Indies' 900th ODI match.

=== 2nd ODI ===
13 July 2026
14:30 (D/N)
Scorecard

West Indies; 138 (36 overs)	v	New Zealand; 141/5 (32.4 overs)
John Campbell 43 (41); Jayden Lennox 5/19 (8 overs)		Tom Latham 37* (61); Khary Pierre 2/33 (9 overs)

New Zealand won by 5 wickets
Providence Stadium, Georgetown
Umpires: Zahid Bassarath (WI) and Ahsan Raza (Pak)
Player of the match: Jayden Lennox (NZ)

- New Zealand won the toss and elected to field.
- Jayden Lennox (NZ) took his maiden five-wicket haul in ODIs.
- This was New Zealand's 400th ODI victory.

=== 3rd ODI ===
16 July 2026
14:30 (D/N)
Scorecard

West Indies; 140 (37.1 overs)	v	New Zealand; 141/4 (39.3 overs)
Keacy Carty 48 (77); Jayden Lennox 4/52 (10 overs)		Tom Latham 31* (53); Vitel Lawes 3/39 (10 overs)

New Zealand won by 6 wickets
Providence Stadium, Georgetown
Umpires: Deighton Butler (WI) and Alex Wharf (Eng)
Player of the match: Jayden Lennox (NZ)

- New Zealand won the toss and elected to field.

=== 4th ODI ===
19 July 2026
14:30 (D/N)
Scorecard

West Indies; 188 (44.4 overs)	v	New Zealand; 189/9 (44.1 overs)
Amir Jangoo 51 (73); Matthew Fisher 3/40 (8 overs)		Mark Chapman 80 (82); Gudakesh Motie 5/47 (10 overs)

New Zealand won by 1 wicket
Kensington Oval, Bridgetown
Umpires: Ahsan Raza (Pak) and Leslie Reifer (WI)
Player of the match: Mitchell Santner (NZ)

- New Zealand won the toss and elected to field.
- Gudakesh Motie (WI) took his maiden five-wicket haul in ODIs.

=== 5th ODI ===
21 July 2026
14:30 (D/N)
Scorecard

New Zealand; 268/9 (50 overs)	v	West Indies; 269/8 (47.3 overs)
Tom Latham 69 (71); Alzarri Joseph 2/38 (10 overs)		Shimron Hetmyer 69* (64); Jayden Lennox 3/35 (9 overs)

West Indies won by 2 wickets
Kensington Oval, Bridgetown
Umpires: Leslie Reifer (WI) and Alex Wharf (Eng)
Player of the match: Shimron Hetmyer (WI)

- West Indies won the toss and elected to field.
