= New Zealand cricket team in India in 2025–26 =

International cricket tour

	India	New Zealand
- Dates: 11 – 31 January 2026
Captains	Shubman Gill (ODIs); Suryakumar Yadav (T20Is)	Michael Bracewell (ODIs); Mitchell Santner (T20Is)

One Day International series
- Results: New Zealand won the 3-match series 2–1
Most runs	Virat Kohli (240)	Daryl Mitchell (352)
Most wickets	Harshit Rana (6)	Kristian Clarke (7)
- Player of the series: Daryl Mitchell (NZ)

Twenty20 International series
- Results: India won the 5-match series 4–1
Most runs	Suryakumar Yadav (242)	Glenn Phillips (176)
Most wickets	Arshdeep Singh (8)	Jacob Duffy (6)
- Player of the series: Suryakumar Yadav (Ind)

The New Zealand cricket team toured India in January 2026 to play the India cricket team. The tour consisted of three One Day International (ODI) and five Twenty20 Internationals (T20I) matches. The T20I series formed part of both teams' preparation ahead of the 2026 Men's T20 World Cup tournament. In June 2025, the Board of Control for Cricket in India (BCCI) confirmed the fixtures for the tour, as a part of the 2025–26 home international season.

As a result of the 3rd ODI, New Zealand won their first ODI series in Indian soil.

== Squads ==
India		New Zealand	
ODIs	T20Is	ODIs	T20Is
Shubman Gill (c); Shreyas Iyer (vc); Ayush Badoni (Note: Only for 2nd and 3rd ODIs); Ravindra Jadeja; Yashasvi Jaiswal; Dhruv Jurel (wk); Virat Kohli; Prasidh Krishna; ~~Rishabh Pant (wk)~~; KL Rahul (wk); Harshit Rana; Nitish Kumar Reddy; Rohit Sharma; Arshdeep Singh; Mohammed Siraj; Washington Sundar; Kuldeep Yadav	Suryakumar Yadav (c); Axar Patel (vc); Ravi Bishnoi; Jasprit Bumrah; Varun Chakaravarthy; Shivam Dube; Shreyas Iyer (Note: Only for 1st, 2nd and 3rd T20Is); Ishan Kishan (wk); Hardik Pandya; Harshit Rana; Sanju Samson (wk); Abhishek Sharma; Arshdeep Singh; Rinku Singh; ~~Washington Sundar~~; Tilak Varma (Note: Only for 4th and 5th T20Is); Kuldeep Yadav	Michael Bracewell (c); Adithya Ashok; Kristian Clarke; Josh Clarkson; Devon Conway; Zak Foulkes; Mitchell Hay (wk); Kyle Jamieson; Nick Kelly; Jayden Lennox; Daryl Mitchell; Henry Nicholls; Glenn Phillips; Michael Rae; Will Young	Mitchell Santner (c); Finn Allen; Michael Bracewell; Mark Chapman; Kristian Clarke; Devon Conway (wk); Jacob Duffy; Lockie Ferguson; Zak Foulkes; Matt Henry; Kyle Jamieson; Bevon Jacobs; Daryl Mitchell; James Neesham; Glenn Phillips; Rachin Ravindra; Tim Robinson; Tim Seifert; Ish Sodhi

On 11 January, Rishabh Pant was ruled out of the ODI series due to injury, and Dhruv Jurel was named as his replacement. On 12 January, Washington Sundar was ruled out of the remainder of ODI series due to left lower rib injury, and Ayush Badoni was named as his replacement. On 16 January, Washington Sundar was ruled out of the T20I series due to injuries, and Ravi Bishnoi and Shreyas Iyer were added into the squad as replacements.

On 20 January, Kristian Clarke was added into the T20I squad for the first three T20Is.

== ODI series ==
=== 1st ODI ===
11 January 2026
13:30 (D/N)
Scorecard

New Zealand; 300/8 (50 overs)	v	India; 306/6 (49 overs)
Daryl Mitchell 84 (71); Mohammed Siraj 2/40 (8 overs)		Virat Kohli 93 (91); Kyle Jamieson 4/41 (10 overs)

India won by 4 wickets
Baroda Cricket Association Stadium, Vadodara
Umpires: K. N. Ananthapadmanabhan (Ind) and Richard Illingworth (Eng)
Player of the match: Virat Kohli (Ind)

- India won the toss and elected to field.
- Kristian Clarke (NZ) made his ODI debut.
- This was the first ODI match to be played at this venue.
- Rohit Sharma (Ind) becomes the first player to complete 650 sixes in international cricket.
- Virat Kohli (Ind) scored his 28,000th run and surpassed Kumar Sangakkara to become the second highest run scorer ever in international cricket.

=== 2nd ODI ===
14 January 2026
13:30 (D/N)
Scorecard

India; 284/7 (50 overs)	v	New Zealand; 286/3 (47.3 overs)
KL Rahul 112* (92); Kristian Clarke 3/56 (8 overs)		Daryl Mitchell 131* (117); Prasidh Krishna 1/49 (9 overs)

New Zealand won by 7 wickets
Niranjan Shah Stadium, Rajkot
Umpires: Richard Illingworth (Eng) and Rohan Pandit (Ind)
Player of the match: Daryl Mitchell (NZ)

- New Zealand won the toss and elected to field.
- Jayden Lennox (NZ) made his ODI debut.

=== 3rd ODI ===
18 January 2026
13:30 (D/N)
Scorecard

New Zealand; 337/8 (50 overs)	v	India; 296 (46 overs)
Daryl Mitchell 137 (131); Arshdeep Singh 3/63 (10 overs)		Virat Kohli 124 (108); Kristian Clarke 3/54 (9 overs)

New Zealand won by 41 runs
Holkar Stadium, Indore
Umpires: K. N. Ananthapadmanabhan (Ind) and Richard Illingworth (Eng)
Player of the match: Daryl Mitchell (NZ)

- India won the toss and elected to field.
- Mohammed Siraj (Ind) played in his 50th ODI match.
- This was New Zealand's first ODI series victory in India.
- This was India's first defeat at this venue in ODIs.

== T20I series ==
=== 1st T20I ===
21 January 2026
19:00 (N)
Scorecard

India; 238/7 (20 overs)	v	New Zealand; 190/7 (20 overs)
Abhishek Sharma 84 (35); Jacob Duffy 2/27 (4 overs)		Glenn Phillips 78 (40); Shivam Dube 2/28 (3 overs)

India won by 48 runs
Vidarbha Cricket Association Stadium, Nagpur
Umpires: Nitin Menon (Ind) and Rohan Pandit (Ind)
Player of the match: Abhishek Sharma (Ind)

- New Zealand won the toss and elected to field.
- Kristian Clarke (NZ) made his T20I debut.
- Suryakumar Yadav (Ind) played in his 100th T20I match.
- This was India's highest T20I score against New Zealand.

=== 2nd T20I ===
23 January 2026
19:00 (N)
Scorecard

New Zealand; 208/6 (20 overs)	v	India; 209/3 (15.2 overs)
Mitchell Santner 47* (27); Kuldeep Yadav 2/35 (4 overs)		Suryakumar Yadav 82* (37); Ish Sodhi 1/34 (3 overs)

India won by 7 wickets
Shaheed Veer Narayan Singh International Cricket Stadium, Raipur
Umpires: K. N. Ananthapadmanabhan (Ind) and Jayaraman Madanagopal (Ind)
Player of the match: Ishan Kishan (Ind)

- India won the toss and elected to field.
- This was India's 100th T20I match on the home soil. Thus, it also became the first Asian team to do the same.
- This was India's joint-highest successful run chase in T20Is.
- This was also the fastest 200-plus run chase in T20Is.

=== 3rd T20I ===
25 January 2026
19:00 (N)
Scorecard

New Zealand; 153/9 (20 overs)	v	India; 155/2 (10 overs)
Glenn Phillips 48 (40); Jasprit Bumrah 3/17 (4 overs)		Abhishek Sharma 68* (20); Matt Henry 1/28 (2 overs); Ish Sodhi 1/28 (2 overs)

India won by 8 wickets
Assam Cricket Association Stadium, Guwahati
Umpires: Jayaraman Madanagopal (Ind) and Nitin Menon (Ind)
Player of the match: Jasprit Bumrah (Ind)

- India won the toss and elected to field.

=== 4th T20I ===
28 January 2026
19:00 (N)
Scorecard

New Zealand; 215/7 (20 overs)	v	India; 165 (18.4 overs)
Tim Seifert 62 (36); Arshdeep Singh 2/33 (4 overs)		Shivam Dube 65 (23); Mitchell Santner 3/26 (4 overs)

New Zealand won by 50 runs
ACA–VDCA Cricket Stadium, Visakhapatnam
Umpires: K. N. Ananthapadmanabhan (Ind) and Rohan Pandit (Ind)
Player of the match: Tim Seifert (NZ)

- India won the toss and elected to field.

=== 5th T20I ===
31 January 2026
19:00 (N)
Scorecard

India; 271/5 (20 overs)	v	New Zealand; 225 (19.4 overs)
Ishan Kishan 103 (43); Lockie Ferguson 2/41 (4 overs)		Finn Allen 80 (38); Arshdeep Singh 5/51 (4 overs)

India won by 46 runs
Greenfield International Stadium, Thiruvananthapuram
Umpires: Jayaraman Madanagopal (Ind) and Nitin Menon (Ind)
Player of the match: Ishan Kishan (Ind)

- India won the toss and elected to bat.
- Suryakumar Yadav (Ind) scored his 3,000th run in T20Is. He also became the fastest player (by balls faced) to the same in T20Is.
- Ishan Kishan (Ind) scored his 1,000th run and maiden century in T20Is.
- Arshdeep Singh (Ind) took his first five-wicket haul in T20Is.
- This was India's highest T20I score against New Zealand, surpassing previous 238/6 in first T20I of this series.
