= Sri Lankan cricket team in New Zealand in 2024–25 =

International cricket tour

	New Zealand	Sri Lanka
- Dates: 28 December 2024 – 11 January 2025
Captains	Mitchell Santner	Charith Asalanka

One Day International series
- Results: New Zealand won the 3-match series 2–1
Most runs	Mark Chapman (172)	Kamindu Mendis (113)
Most wickets	Matt Henry (9)	Maheesh Theekshana (7)
- Player of the series: Matt Henry (NZ)

Twenty20 International series
- Results: New Zealand won the 3-match series 2–1
Most runs	Daryl Mitchell (115)	Kusal Perera (149)
Most wickets	Jacob Duffy (8)	Wanindu Hasaranga (6)
- Player of the series: Jacob Duffy (NZ)

The Sri Lanka cricket team toured New Zealand in December 2024 and January 2025 to play the New Zealand cricket team. The tour consisted of three One Day International (ODI) and three Twenty20 International (T20I) matches. In July 2024, the New Zealand Cricket (NZC) confirmed the fixtures for the tour, as a part of the 2024–25 home international season.

== Squads ==
New Zealand		Sri Lanka	
ODIs	T20Is	ODIs	T20Is
Mitchell Santner (c); Michael Bracewell; Mark Chapman; Jacob Duffy; Mitchell Hay (wk); Matt Henry; Tom Latham (wk); Daryl Mitchell; William O'Rourke; Glenn Phillips; Rachin Ravindra; Nathan Smith; Will Young	Mitchell Santner (c); Michael Bracewell; Mark Chapman; Jacob Duffy; Zak Foulkes; Mitchell Hay (wk); Matt Henry; Bevon Jacobs; Daryl Mitchell; Glenn Phillips; Rachin Ravindra; Tim Robinson; Nathan Smith	Charith Asalanka (c); Asitha Fernando; Avishka Fernando; Nuwanidu Fernando; Wanindu Hasaranga; Lahiru Kumara; Janith Liyanage; Nishan Madushka (wk); Eshan Malinga; Kamindu Mendis; Kusal Mendis (wk); Pathum Nissanka; Mohamed Shiraz; Maheesh Theekshana; Jeffrey Vandersay; Dunith Wellalage; Chamindu Wickramasinghe	Charith Asalanka (c); Dinesh Chandimal (wk); Asitha Fernando; Avishka Fernando; Binura Fernando; Wanindu Hasaranga; Kamindu Mendis; Kusal Mendis (wk); Pathum Nissanka; Matheesha Pathirana; Kusal Perera (wk); Bhanuka Rajapaksa; Maheesh Theekshana; Nuwan Thushara; Jeffrey Vandersay; Chamindu Wickramasinghe

== Tour matches ==
New Zealand XI played two warm-up games against touring Sri Lankan team on 23 December. One match was played in T20 format while the other match was played in T10 format.

=== 10 overs match ===
23 December 2024
Scorecard

Sri Lanka; 128/2 (10 overs)	v	New Zealand XI; 96/2 (10 overs)
Wanindu Hasaranga 27 (11); Matthew Fisher 1/12 (1 over)		Matthew Boyle 57* (34); Nuwan Thushara 2/10 (2 overs)

Sri Lanka won by 32 runs
Bert Sutcliffe Oval, Lincoln
Umpires: Regan Dalley and Kannan Jagannathan

- No toss

=== 20 overs match ===
23 December 2024
11:00
Scorecard

New Zealand XI; 94 (13.4 overs)	v	Sri Lanka; 97/3 (10.5 overs)
Bevon Jacobs 39 (16); Wanindu Hasaranga 3/12 (2.3 overs)		Kusal Perera 30 (22); Ben Lister 1/10 (2 overs)

Sri Lanka won by 7 wickets
Bert Sutcliffe Oval, Lincoln
Umpires: Regan Dalley and Kannan Jagannathan

- No toss

== T20I series ==
=== 1st T20I ===
28 December 2024
19:15 (N)
Scorecard

New Zealand; 172/8 (20 overs)	v	Sri Lanka; 164/8 (20 overs)
Daryl Mitchell 62 (42); Binura Fernando 2/22 (4 overs)		Pathum Nissanka 90 (60); Jacob Duffy 3/21 (4 overs)

New Zealand won by 8 runs
Bay Oval, Mount Maunganui
Umpires: Chris Brown (NZ) and Shaun Haig (NZ)
Player of the match: Jacob Duffy (NZ)

- Sri Lanka won the toss and elected to field.

=== 2nd T20I ===
30 December 2024
19:15 (N)
Scorecard

New Zealand; 186/5 (20 overs)	v	Sri Lanka; 141 (19.1 overs)
Mark Chapman 42 (29); Wanindu Hasaranga 2/28 (4 overs)		Kusal Perera 48 (35); Jacob Duffy 4/15 (4 overs)

New Zealand won by 45 runs
Bay Oval, Mount Maunganui
Umpires: Kim Cotton (NZ) and Wayne Knights (NZ)
Player of the match: Mitchell Hay (NZ)

- Sri Lanka won the toss and elected to field.

=== 3rd T20I ===
2 January 2025
13:15
Scorecard

Sri Lanka; 218/5 (20 overs)	v	New Zealand; 211/7 (20 overs)
Kusal Perera 101 (46); Daryl Mitchell 1/6 (1 over)		Rachin Ravindra 69 (39); Charith Asalanka 3/50 (4 overs)

Sri Lanka won by 7 runs
Saxton Oval, Nelson
Umpires: Chris Brown (NZ) and Shaun Haig (NZ)
Player of the match: Kusal Perera (SL)

- New Zealand won the toss and elected to field.
- Kusal Perera (SL) scored his 2,000th run and maiden century in T20Is. He became the third Sri Lankan player to score a T20I century after Tillakaratne Dilshan and Mahela Jayawardene.
- This was Sri Lanka's first victory in T20Is in New Zealand since 2006.

== ODI series ==
=== 1st ODI ===
5 January 2025
11:00
Scorecard

Sri Lanka; 178 (43.4 overs)	v	New Zealand; 180/1 (26.2 overs)
Avishka Fernando 56 (63); Matt Henry 4/19 (10 overs)		Will Young 90* (86); Chamindu Wickramasinghe 1/28 (3.2 overs)

New Zealand won by 9 wickets
Basin Reserve, Wellington
Umpires: Shaun Haig (NZ) and Richard Illingworth (Eng)
Player of the match: Matt Henry (NZ)

- New Zealand won the toss and elected to field.
- Eshan Malinga (SL) made his ODI debut.

=== 2nd ODI ===
8 January 2025
14:00 (D/N)
Scorecard

New Zealand; 255/9 (37 overs)	v	Sri Lanka; 142 (30.2 overs)
Rachin Ravindra 79 (63); Maheesh Theekshana 4/44 (8 overs)		Kamindu Mendis 64 (66); William O'Rourke 3/31 (6.2 overs)

New Zealand won by 113 runs
Seddon Park, Hamilton
Umpires: Cory Black (NZ) and Richard Kettleborough (Eng)
Player of the match: Rachin Ravindra (NZ)

- Sri Lanka won the toss and elected to field.
- The match was reduced to 37 overs per side due to rain.
- Maheesh Theekshana (SL) took a hat-trick.

=== 3rd ODI ===
11 January 2025
14:00 (D/N)
Scorecard

Sri Lanka; 290/8 (50 overs)	v	New Zealand; 150 (29.4 overs)
Pathum Nissanka 66 (42); Matt Henry 4/55 (10 overs)		Mark Chapman 81 (81); Asitha Fernando 3/26 (7 overs)

Sri Lanka won by 140 runs
Eden Park, Auckland
Umpires: Shaun Haig (NZ) and Richard Illingworth (Eng)
Player of the match: Asitha Fernando (SL)

- Sri Lanka won the toss and elected to bat.
- Matt Henry (NZ) took his 150th wicket in ODIs.
