= New Zealand cricket team in Pakistan in 2024 =

International cricket tour

| | Pakistan | New Zealand |
- Dates: 18 – 27 April 2024
| Captains | Babar Azam | Michael Bracewell |

Twenty20 International series
- Results: 5-match series drawn 2–2
| Most runs | Babar Azam (125) | Mark Chapman (126) |
| Most wickets | Shaheen Afridi (8) | William O'Rourke (4) |
- Player of the series: Shaheen Afridi (Pak)

The New Zealand cricket team toured Pakistan in April 2024 to play five Twenty20 International (T20I) matches. The series formed part of both teams' preparations for the 2024 ICC Men's T20 World Cup. The first three T20Is of the series took place in Rawalpindi and the entourage moved to Lahore for the remaining two T20Is.

The Pakistan Cricket Board (PCB) announced Azhar Mahmood as Pakistan's head coach for the series. See More on buzzer

== Squads ==
| Pakistan | New Zealand |
|---|---|
| Babar Azam (c); Abbas Afridi; Shaheen Afridi; Abrar Ahmed; Iftikhar Ahmed; Mohammad Amir; Saim Ayub; ~~Azam Khan (wk)~~; Haseebullah Khan (wk); Irfan Khan; Shadab Khan; Usman Khan; Zaman Khan; Usama Mir; Mohammad Rizwan (wk); Naseem Shah; Imad Wasim; Fakhar Zaman | Michael Bracewell (c); ~~Finn Allen~~; Tom Blundell (wk); Mark Chapman; Josh Clarkson; Jacob Duffy; Zak Foulkes; Dean Foxcroft; Ben Lister; Cole McConchie; ~~Adam Milne~~; Jimmy Neesham; Will O'Rourke; Tim Robinson; Ben Sears; Tim Seifert (wk); Ish Sodhi |

On 9 April 2024, the PCB announced the 17-member squad for the series. Haseebullah Khan, Mohammad Ali, Mohammad Wasim Jr., Sahibzada Farhan, and Salman Ali Agha were all named as reserves.

On 12 April 2024, New Zealand's Finn Allen and Adam Milne were ruled out of the series due to their respective injuries, with Tom Blundell and Zak Foulkes were named as their replacements.

On 20 April 2024, Pakistan's Azam Khan was ruled out of series due to an injury, with Haseebullah Khan moved to main squad.

On 24 April 2024, both Mohammad Rizwan and Irfan Khan were ruled out of the Pakistan's squad for last two T20Is.

== T20I series ==
=== 1st T20I ===
18 April 2024
19:30 (N)
Scorecard

| New Zealand; 2/1 (0.2 overs) | v | Pakistan |
| Tim Robinson 0 (2); Shaheen Afridi 1/0 (0.2 overs) |

No result
Rawalpindi Cricket Stadium, Rawalpindi
Umpires: Aleem Dar (Pak) and Ahsan Raza (Pak)

- New Zealand won the toss and elected to bat.
- The match was reduced to 5 overs per side due to rain. No further play was possible due to rain.
- Abrar Ahmed, Irfan Khan, Usman Khan (Pak) and Tim Robinson (NZ) all made their T20I debuts.
- Michael Bracewell captained New Zealand for the first time in T20Is.

=== 2nd T20I ===
20 April 2024
19:30 (N)
Scorecard

| New Zealand; 90 (19.1 overs) | v | Pakistan; 92/3 (12.1 overs) |
| Mark Chapman 19 (16); Shaheen Afridi 3/13 (3.1 overs) | | Mohammad Rizwan 45* (34); Ben Lister 1/10 (2 overs) |

Pakistan won by 7 wickets
Rawalpindi Cricket Stadium, Rawalpindi
Umpires: Aleem Dar (Pak) and Asif Yaqoob (Pak)
Player of the match: Shaheen Afridi (Pak)

- Pakistan won the toss and elected to field.
- Mohammad Rizwan (Pak) became the fastest player to score 3,000 runs in T20Is (79 innings), beating Virat Kohli (Ind) and Babar Azam (Pak) (81 innings each).

=== 3rd T20I ===
21 April 2024
19:30 (N)
Scorecard

| Pakistan; 178/4 (20 overs) | v | New Zealand; 179/3 (18.2 overs) |
| Shadab Khan 41 (20); Ish Sodhi 2/25 (4 overs) | | Mark Chapman 87* (42); Abbas Afridi 2/27 (3 overs) |

New Zealand won by 7 wickets
Rawalpindi Cricket Stadium, Rawalpindi
Umpires: Ahsan Raza (Pak) and Asif Yaqoob (Pak)
Player of the match: Mark Chapman (NZ)

- New Zealand won the toss and elected to field.
- Zak Foulkes and William O'Rourke (NZ) both made their T20I debuts.

=== 4th T20I ===
25 April 2024
19:30 (N)
Scorecard

| New Zealand; 178/7 (20 overs) | v | Pakistan; 174/8 (20 overs) |
| Tim Robinson 51 (36); Abbas Afridi 3/20 (3 overs) | | Fakhar Zaman 61 (45); William O’Rourke 3/27 (4 overs) |

New Zealand won by 4 runs
Gaddafi Stadium, Lahore
Umpires: Faisal Afridi (Pak) and Rashid Riaz (Pak)
Player of the match: William O’Rourke (NZ)

- Pakistan won the toss and elected to field.

=== 5th T20I ===
27 April 2024
19:30 (N)
Scorecard

| Pakistan; 178/5 (20 overs) | v | New Zealand; 169 (19.2 overs) |
| Babar Azam 69 (44); James Neesham 1/13 (1 over) | | Tim Seifert 52 (33); Shaheen Afridi 4/30 (4 overs) |

Pakistan won by 9 runs
Gaddafi Stadium, Lahore
Umpires: Faisal Afridi (Pak) and Rashid Riaz (Pak)
Player of the match: Shaheen Afridi (Pak)

- New Zealand won the toss and elected to field.
