= New Zealand cricket team in Zimbabwe in 2025 =

International cricket tour

	Zimbabwe	New Zealand
- Dates: 30 July – 11 August 2025
Captains	Craig Ervine	Mitchell Santner

Test series
- Result: New Zealand won the 2-match series 2–0
Most runs	Tafadzwa Tsiga (95)	Devon Conway (245)
Most wickets	Blessing Muzarabani (4)	Matt Henry (16)
- Player of the series: Matt Henry (NZ)

The New Zealand cricket team toured Zimbabwe in July and August 2025 to play the Zimbabwe cricket team. The tour consisted of two Test matches, preceded by a tri-nation T20I series also involving South Africa. In March 2025, the Zimbabwe Cricket (ZC) confirmed the fixtures for the tour, as a part of the 2025 home international season.

== Squads ==
Zimbabwe	New Zealand
Craig Ervine (c); Brian Bennett; Tanaka Chivanga; Ben Curran; Trevor Gwandu; Roy Kaia; Tanunurwa Makoni; Clive Madande (wk); Vincent Masekesa; Wellington Masakadza; Blessing Muzarabani; Newman Nyamhuri; Sikandar Raza; Brendan Taylor (wk) (Note: In squad for second Test only.); Tafadzwa Tsiga (wk); Nick Welch; Sean Williams	Mitchell Santner (c); ~~Tom Latham (c, wk)~~; Tom Blundell (wk); Michael Bracewell (Note: In squad for first Test only.); Devon Conway (wk); Jacob Duffy; Matthew Fisher; Zak Foulkes; Matt Henry; Bevon Jacobs; Ben Lister; Daryl Mitchell; Henry Nicholls; Will O'Rourke; Ajaz Patel; ~~Glenn Phillips~~; Rachin Ravindra; Nathan Smith; Will Young

On 18 July, Glenn Phillips was ruled out of the series due to right groin injury. On 24 July, Michael Bracewell was added into the squad for the first Test as replacement for Phillips. On 29 July, Tom Latham was ruled out of the first Test due to shoulder injury and Mitchell Santner was named as captain. On 3 August, Nathan Smith was ruled out of the second Test due to an abdominal strain, with Zak Foulkes named was his replacement. Also Ben Lister was added as a cover for Will O'Rourke. On 6 August, Will O'Rourke was ruled out of the second Test due to a back injury. On 6 August, Latham was ruled out of the second Test, with Bevon Jacobs added to the squad.

On 30 July, Brendan Taylor was added to the squad for the second Test.

== Test series ==
=== 1st Test ===
30 July–1 August 2025
Scorecard

Zimbabwe	v	New Zealand
149 (60.3 overs); Craig Ervine 39 (116); Matt Henry 6/39 (15.3 overs)		307 (96.1 overs); Devon Conway 88 (170); Blessing Muzarabani 3/73 (26 overs)
165 (67.1 overs); Sean Williams 49 (66); Mitchell Santner 4/27 (17.1 overs)		8/1 (2.2 overs); Henry Nicholls 4* (2); Newman Nyamhuri 1/8 (1.2 overs)

New Zealand won by 9 wickets
Queens Sports Club, Bulawayo
Umpires: Alex Wharf (Eng) and Asif Yaqoob (Pak)
Player of the match: Matt Henry (NZ)

- Zimbabwe won the toss and elected to bat.
- Mitchell Santner captained New Zealand for the first time in Tests.

=== 2nd Test ===
7–9 August 2025
Scorecard

Zimbabwe	v	New Zealand
125 (48.5 overs); Brendan Taylor 44 (107); Matt Henry 5/40 (15 overs)		601/3d (130 overs); Rachin Ravindra 165* (139); Blessing Muzarabani 1/101 (24 overs)
117 (28.1 overs); Nick Welch 47* (71); Zak Foulkes 5/37 (9 overs)

New Zealand won by an innings and 359 runs
Queens Sports Club, Bulawayo
Umpires: Alex Wharf (Eng) and Asif Yaqoob (Pak)
Player of the match: Devon Conway (NZ)

- Zimbabwe won the toss and elected to bat.
- Jacob Duffy, Matthew Fisher and Zak Foulkes (NZ) all made their Test debuts.
- Zak Foulkes (NZ) took his first five-wicket haul in Tests, and the best match figures (9/75) for a New Zealand bowler on Test debut.
- This was the biggest loss for Zimbabwe and the largest win for New Zealand (in terms of runs) in Tests.
