= 2025 Zimbabwe Tri-Nation Series =

International cricket tournament

- Date: 14–26 July 2025
- Location: Zimbabwe
- Result: New Zealand won the series
- Player of the series: Matt Henry (NZ)
Teams
New Zealand	South Africa	Zimbabwe
Captains
Mitchell Santner	Rassie van der Dussen	Sikandar Raza
Most runs
Tim Seifert (196)	Dewald Brevis (133)	Brian Bennett (113)
Most wickets
Matt Henry (10)	Lungi Ngidi (5)	Richard Ngarava (8)

The 2025 Zimbabwe Tri-Nation Series was a cricket tournament held from 14 to 26 July 2025 in Zimbabwe. It was a tri-nation series involving Zimbabwe, South Africa and New Zealand cricket teams, with the matches played in Twenty20 International (T20I) format. All the matches were played at the Harare Sports Club in a double round-robin format.

== Squads ==
New Zealand	South Africa	Zimbabwe
Mitchell Santner (c); ~~Finn Allen~~; Michael Bracewell; Mark Chapman; Devon Conway; Jacob Duffy; Zak Foulkes; Mitchell Hay; Matt Henry; Bevon Jacobs; Adam Milne; Daryl Mitchell; James Neesham; Will O'Rourke; ~~Glenn Phillips~~; Rachin Ravindra; Tim Robinson; Tim Seifert (wk); Ish Sodhi	Rassie van der Dussen (c); Corbin Bosch; Dewald Brevis; Nandre Burger; Gerald Coetzee; Reeza Hendricks; Rubin Hermann (wk); George Linde; Kwena Maphaka; Senuran Muthusamy; Lungi Ngidi; Nqaba Peter; Lhuan-dre Pretorius (wk); Andile Simelane	Sikandar Raza (c); Brian Bennett; Ryan Burl; Trevor Gwandu; Clive Madande (wk); Wessly Madhevere; Tinotenda Maposa; Wellington Masakadza; Vincent Masekesa; Tony Munyonga; Tashinga Musekiwa; Blessing Muzarabani; Dion Myers; Richard Ngarava; Newman Nyamhuri; Tafadzwa Tsiga (wk)

On 9 July, Finn Allen was ruled out of the series due to a foot injury. On 13 July, Devon Conway, Mitchell Hay, James Neesham and Tim Robinson were added into the squad for the series. On 18 July, Glenn Phillips was ruled out of the series due to right groin injury.

== Points table ==
Pos	Team	Pld	W	L	NR	Pts	NRR	Qualification
1	New Zealand	4	4	0	0	8	2.200	Advanced to the final
2	South Africa	4	2	2	0	4	0.012	Advanced to the final
3	Zimbabwe (H)	4	0	4	0	0	−2.253	

Source: ESPNcricinfo
(H) Host

== Fixtures ==
=== 1st T20I ===
14 July 2025
13:00
Scorecard

Zimbabwe; 141/6 (20 overs)	v	South Africa; 142/5 (15.5 overs)
Sikandar Raza 54* (38); George Linde 3/10 (3 overs)		Rubin Hermann 45 (37); Richard Ngarava 3/35 (4 overs)

South Africa won by 5 wickets
Harare Sports Club, Harare
Umpires: Iknow Chabi (Zim) and Langton Rusere (Zim)
Player of the match: Dewald Brevis (SA)

- South Africa won the toss and elected to field.
- Corbin Bosch, Rubin Hermann and Lhuan-dre Pretorius (SA) all made their T20I debuts.

=== 2nd T20I ===
16 July 2025
13:00
Scorecard

New Zealand; 173/5 (20 overs)	v	South Africa; 152 (18.2 overs)
Tim Robinson 75* (57); Kwena Maphaka 2/38 (4 overs)		Dewald Brevis 35 (18); Jacob Duffy 3/20 (4 overs)

New Zealand won by 21 runs
Harare Sports Club, Harare
Umpires: Iknow Chabi (Zim) and Percival Sizara (Zim)
Player of the match: Tim Robinson (NZ)

- South Africa won the toss and elected to field.
- Bevon Jacobs (NZ) and Senuran Muthusamy (SA) both made their T20I debuts.

=== 3rd T20I ===
18 July 2025
13:00
Scorecard

Zimbabwe; 120/7 (20 overs)	v	New Zealand; 122/2 (13.5 overs)
Wessly Madhevere 36 (32); Matt Henry 3/26 (4 overs)		Devon Conway 59* (40); Tinotenda Maposa 1/17 (2 overs)

New Zealand by 8 wickets
Harare Sports Club, Harare
Umpires: Forster Mutizwa (Zim) and Langton Rusere (Zim)
Player of the match: Devon Conway (NZ)

- New Zealand won the toss and elected to field.

=== 4th T20I ===
20 July 2025
13:00
Scorecard

Zimbabwe; 144/6 (20 overs)	v	South Africa; 145/3 (17.2 overs)
Brian Bennett 61 (43); Corbin Bosch 2/16 (4 overs)		Rubin Hermann 63 (36); Tinotenda Maposa 2/38 (4 overs)

South Africa won by 7 wickets
Harare Sports Club, Harare
Umpires: Forster Mutizwa (Zim) and Percival Sizara (Zim)
Player of the match: Rubin Hermann (SA)

- South Africa won the toss and elected to field.

=== 5th T20I ===
22 July 2025
13:00
Scorecard

South Africa; 134/8 (20 overs)	v	New Zealand; 135/3 (15.5 overs)
Reeza Hendricks 41 (37); Adam Milne 2/21 (4 overs)		Tim Seifert 66* (48); Senuran Muthusamy 2/24 (4 overs)

New Zealand won by 7 wickets
Harare Sports Club, Harare
Umpires: Langton Rusere (Zim) and Percival Sizara (Zim)
Player of the match: Tim Seifert (NZ)

- New Zealand won the toss and elected to field.

=== 6th T20I ===
24 July 2025
13:00
Scorecard

New Zealand; 190/6 (20 overs)	v	Zimbabwe; 130 (18.5 overs)
Tim Seifert 75 (45); Richard Ngarava 4/34 (4 overs)		Tony Munyonga 40 (30); Ish Sodhi 4/12 (4 overs)

New Zealand won by 60 runs
Harare Sports Club, Harare
Umpires: Iknow Chabi (Zim) and Forster Mutizwa (Zim)
Player of the match: Ish Sodhi (NZ)

- New Zealand won the toss and elected to bat.
- Ish Sodhi (NZ) took his 150th wicket in T20Is.

== Final ==
26 July 2025
13:00
Scorecard

New Zealand; 180/5 (20 overs)	v	South Africa; 177/6 (20 overs)
Rachin Ravindra 47 (27); Lungi Ngidi 2/24 (4 overs)		Lhuan-dre Pretorius 51 (35); Matt Henry 2/19 (3 overs)

New Zealand won by 3 runs
Harare Sports Club, Harare
Umpires: Iknow Chabi (Zim) and Langton Rusere (Zim)
Player of the match: Matt Henry (NZ)

- South Africa won the toss and elected to field.
