= Paul Hitchcock =

New Zealand cricketer (born 1975)

Personal information
- Full name: Paul Anthony Hitchcock
- Born: 23 January 1975 (age 51); Whangārei, New Zealand
- Batting: Right-handed
- Bowling: Right-arm medium

International information
- National side: New Zealand (2002–2008)
- ODI debut (cap 129): 5 June 2002 v West Indies
- Last ODI: 15 February 2008 v England
- Only T20I (cap 32): 7 February 2008 v England

Domestic team information
- Years: Team
- 1997/98–1998/99: Auckland
- 1999/00–2002/03: Wellington
- 2003/04–2008/09: Auckland
- 2009/10: Wellington

Career statistics
| Competition | ODI | T20I | FC | LA |
|---|---|---|---|---|
| Matches | 14 | 1 | 11 | 105 |
| Runs scored | 41 | 13 | 298 | 1,424 |
| Batting average | 10.25 | 13.00 | 22.92 | 21.25 |
| 100s/50s | 0/0 | 0/0 | 0/1 | 2/2 |
| Top score | 11* | 13 | 51 | 108 |
| Balls bowled | 558 | 18 | 1,389 | 4,829 |
| Wickets | 12 | 2 | 14 | 139 |
| Bowling average | 39.00 | 21.50 | 53.35 | 28.27 |
| 5 wickets in innings | 0 | 0 | 0 | 1 |
| 10 wickets in match | 0 | 0 | 0 | 0 |
| Best bowling | 3/30 | 2/43 | 3/27 | 5/10 |
| Catches/stumpings | 4/– | 0/– | 1/– | 22/– |
- Source: Cricinfo, 29 April 2022

Paul Anthony Hitchcock (born 23 January 1975) is a former New Zealand cricketer, who played 14 One Day Internationals and single Twenty20 International for the New Zealand national cricket team. He was born at Whangārei in New Zealand's Northland Region in 1975.

Primarily a limited-overs player, Hitchcock played domestically for Auckland and Wellington between 1997 and 2010.
