= Paddy O'Rourke (cricketer) =

New Zealand cricketer (born 1965)

Personal information
- Full name: Patrick William O'Rourke
- Born: 12 January 1965 (age 61); Masterton, New Zealand
- Relatives: Matthew O'Rourke (brother); William O'Rourke (son)
- Source: Cricinfo, 27 October 2020

Paddy O'Rourke (born 12 January 1965) is a New Zealand cricketer. He played in 29 first-class and 19 List A matches for Wellington from 1989 to 1993.

== See also ==
- List of Wellington representative cricketers
