= List of New Zealand Twenty20 International cricketers =

This is a list of New Zealand Twenty20 International cricketers. A Twenty20 International is an international cricket match between two representative teams, each having ODI status, as determined by the International Cricket Council (ICC). A Twenty20 International is played under the rules of Twenty20 cricket. The list is arranged in the order in which each player won his first Twenty20 cap. Where more than one player won his first Twenty20 cap in the same match, those players are listed alphabetically by surname.

== Key ==
General

- ‡ – Captain
- † – Wicket-keeper
- First – Year of debut
- Last – Year of latest game
- Mat – Number of matches played

Batting

- Runs – Runs scored in career
- HS – Highest score
- Avg – Runs scored per dismissal
- * – Batsman remained not out
- 50 – Half-centuries scored
- 100 – Centuries scored

Bowling

- Balls – Balls bowled in career
- Wkt – Wickets taken in career
- BBI – Best bowling in an innings
- Ave – Average runs per wicket

Fielding

- Ca – Catches taken
- St – Stumpings taken

== Players ==
Statistics are correct as of 2 May 2026.

New Zealand T20I cricketers
General					Batting					Bowling				Fielding	
No.	Name	First	Last	Mat	Runs	HS	Avg	50	100	Balls	Wkt	BBI	Ave	Ca	St
1	Andre Adams	2005	2006	4	13	7	6.50	0	0	77	3	2/20	35.00	1	0
2	Chris Cairns	2005	2006	2	3	2	1.50	0	0	48	1	1/28	52.00	1	0
3	Stephen Fleming ‡	2005	2006	5	110	38	22.00	0	0	—	—	—	—	2	0
4	Hamish Marshall	2005	2006	3	12	8	6.00	0	0	—	—	—	—	1	0
5	Brendon McCullum ‡†	2005	2015	71	2,140	123	35.66	13	2	—	—	—	—	36	8
6	Craig McMillan	2005	2007	8	187	57	31.16	1	0	—	—	—	—	3	0
7	Kyle Mills ‡	2005	2014	42	137	33*	11.41	0	0	897	43	3/26	28.55	8	0
8	Mathew Sinclair	2005	2007	2	0	0	0.00	0	0	—	—	—	—	0	0
9	Scott Styris	2005	2010	31	378	66	21.40	1	0	309	18	3/5	19.38	8	0
10	Daryl Tuffey	2005	2010	3	5	5*	5.00	0	0	60	3	2/16	31.00	0	0
11	Jeff Wilson	2005	2005	1	18	18	18.00	0	0	24	0	—	—	0	0
12	Nathan Astle	2005	2006	4	74	40*	24.66	0	0	41	4	3/20	12.50	3	0
13	Shane Bond	2005	2010	20	21	8*	4.20	0	0	465	25	3/18	21.72	4	0
14	James Marshall	2005	2008	3	14	13	7.00	0	0	—	—	—	—	0	0
15	Jacob Oram	2005	2012	36	474	66*	20.60	2	0	546	19	3/33	41.73	12	0
16	Jeetan Patel	2005	2008	11	9	5	3.00	0	0	199	16	3/20	16.81	12	0
17	James Franklin	2006	2013	38	463	60	20.13	2	0	327	20	4/15	20.85	12	0
18	Peter Fulton	2006	2012	12	127	25	11.54	0	0	—	—	—	—	4	0
19	Lou Vincent	2006	2007	9	174	42	19.33	0	0	—	—	—	—	1	0
20	Mark Gillespie	2006	2008	11	21	7	10.50	0	0	210	10	4/7	25.50	1	0
21	Peter McGlashan †	2006	2010	11	61	26	7.62	0	0	—	—	—	—	9	0
22	Ross Taylor (Note: Ross Taylor also played for Samoa. Only his records for New Zealand are given above.) ‡	2006	2020	102	1,909	63	26.15	7	0	—	—	—	—	46	0
23	Michael Mason	2006	2008	3	2	2	2.00	0	0	54	2	1/18	32.50	0	0
24	Chris Martin	2007	2008	6	5	5*	—	0	0	138	7	2/14	27.57	1	0
25	Daniel Vettori ‡	2007	2014	34	205	38	12.81	0	0	787	38	4/20	19.68	9	0
26	Nathan McCullum	2007	2016	63	299	36*	11.50	0	0	1,123	58	4/16	22.03	26	0
27	Gareth Hopkins †	2007	2010	10	86	36	10.75	0	0	—	—	—	—	4	2
28	Jamie How	2007	2008	5	56	31	11.20	0	0	—	—	—	—	1	0
29	Jesse Ryder	2008	2014	22	457	62	22.85	3	0	60	2	1/2	34.00	7	0
30	Tim Southee ‡	2008	2024	126	303	39	11.22	0	0	2,753	164	5/18	22.38	65	0
31	Daniel Flynn	2008	2012	5	59	23	11.80	0	0	6	0	—	—	2	0
32	Paul Hitchcock	2008	2008	1	13	13	13.00	0	0	18	2	2/43	21.50	0	0
33	Ewen Thompson	2008	2008	1	1	1*	—	0	0	18	1	1/18	18.00	0	0
34	Neil Broom	2009	2017	11	73	36	12.16	0	0	—	—	—	—	4	0
35	Ian Butler	2009	2013	19	5	2*	5.00	0	0	358	23	3/19	20.91	3	0
36	Grant Elliott (Note: Grant Elliott also played for World XI. Only his records for New Zealand are given above.)	2009	2016	16	157	27	15.70	0	0	180	14	4/22	15.57	4	0
37	Martin Guptill	2009	2022	122	3,531	105	31.81	20	2	6	0	—	—	68	0
38	Iain O'Brien	2009	2009	4	—	—	—	—	—	78	6	2/30	19.33	0	0
39	Brendon Diamanti	2009	2009	1	—	—	—	—	—	12	0	—	—	0	0
40	Aaron Redmond	2009	2010	7	126	63	21.00	1	0	17	2	2/24	12.00	3	0
41	BJ Watling †	2009	2014	5	38	22	9.50	0	0	—	—	—	—	3	0
42	Peter Ingram	2010	2010	3	22	20*	11.00	0	0	—	—	—	—	1	0
43	Andy McKay	2010	2010	2	0	0	0.00	0	0	34	2	2/20	15.50	0	0
44	Rob Nicol	2010	2013	21	327	58	17.21	2	0	123	5	2/20	33.40	5	0
45	Dean Brownlie	2010	2014	5	6	5	1.20	0	0	—	—	—	—	3	0
46	Adam Milne	2010	2025	56	83	16*	8.30	0	0	1,157	65	5/26	24.64	12	0
47	Luke Woodcock	2010	2011	3	—	—	—	—	—	60	1	1/30	70.00	1	0
48	Doug Bracewell	2011	2021	20	126	44	21.00	0	0	310	20	3/25	23.50	7	0
49	Kane Williamson ‡	2011	2024	93	2,575	95	33.44	18	0	118	6	2/16	27.33	45	0
50	Graeme Aldridge	2011	2011	1	—	—	—	—	—	24	1	1/45	45.00	1	0
51	Michael Bates	2012	2012	3	—	—	—	—	—	66	4	3/31	26.75	0	0
52	Colin de Grandhomme	2012	2021	41	505	59	15.78	2	0	321	12	2/22	38.41	20	0
53	Ronnie Hira	2012	2013	15	37	20*	18.50	0	0	254	10	2/42	33.70	2	0
54	Andrew Ellis	2012	2013	5	25	16	8.33	0	0	60	2	2/40	52.50	0	0
55	Tom Latham ‡†	2012	2026	29	597	65*	27.13	4	0	—	—	—	—	15	4
56	Corey Anderson (Note: Corey Anderson also played for United States. Only his records for New Zealand are given above.)	2012	2018	31	485	94*	24.25	2	0	360	14	2/17	35.35	19	0
57	Mitchell McClenaghan	2012	2016	28	14	6*	4.66	0	0	590	30	3/17	25.26	7	0
58	Colin Munro	2012	2020	65	1,724	109*	31.34	11	3	118	4	1/12	46.50	19	0
59	James Neesham ‡	2012	2026	105	1,105	48*	20.09	0	0	1,051	64	5/22	25.17	50	0
60	Trent Boult	2013	2024	61	58	16	8.28	0	0	1,389	83	4/13	21.43	22	0
61	Hamish Rutherford	2013	2019	8	151	62	21.57	1	0	—	—	—	—	1	0
62	Anton Devcich	2013	2014	4	111	59	27.75	1	0	72	2	2/16	40.00	2	0
63	Luke Ronchi † (Note: Luke Ronchi also played for Australia and World XI. Only his records for New Zealand are given above.)	2013	2017	29	312	51*	18.35	1	0	—	—	—	—	24	5
64	Ish Sodhi	2014	2026	142	243	33	8.67	0	0	2,792	165	4/12	23.01	41	0
65	Matt Henry	2014	2026	43	47	12	5.87	0	0	863	53	3/26	23.07	10	0
66	Mitchell Santner ‡	2015	2026	138	1,108	77*	20.51	2	0	2,832	142	4/11	23.85	49	0
67	George Worker	2015	2015	2	90	62	45.00	1	0	12	1	1/19	19.00	1	0
68	Todd Astle	2016	2021	5	4	3	2.00	0	0	78	7	4/13	16.57	3	0
69	Henry Nicholls	2016	2021	10	100	36*	12.50	0	0	—	—	—	—	3	0
70	Tom Bruce (Note: Tom Bruce also played for Scotland. Only his records for New Zealand are given above.) †	2017	2020	17	279	59*	18.60	2	0	—	—	—	—	15	0
71	Lockie Ferguson	2017	2026	54	38	14	4.22	0	0	1,109	76	5/21	17.82	17	0
72	Ben Wheeler	2017	2018	6	37	30	18.50	0	0	128	7	2/16	30.85	1	0
73	Tom Blundell †	2017	2024	9	91	30*	15.16	0	0	—	—	—	—	3	0
74	Glenn Phillips †	2017	2026	97	2,286	108	31.75	12	2	230	9	3/6	36.33	63	2
75	Anaru Kitchen	2017	2018	5	38	16	12.66	0	0	36	2	1/3	23.00	3	0
76	Seth Rance	2017	2019	8	10	8	3.33	0	0	162	10	3/26	24.50	0	0
77	Mark Chapman (Note: Mark Chapman also played for Hong Kong. Only his records for New Zealand are given above.)	2018	2026	94	1,682	104*	26.69	9	1	24	1	1/9	22.00	44	0
78	Tim Seifert †	2018	2026	90	2,279	97*	31.21	17	0	—	—	—	—	45	13
79	Ajaz Patel	2018	2021	7	7	4	3.50	0	0	156	11	4/16	10.72	0	0
80	Scott Kuggeleijn	2019	2021	18	79	35*	19.75	0	0	323	16	3/27	29.43	6	0
81	Daryl Mitchell ‡	2019	2026	104	1,879	72*	26.84	8	0	115	9	2/27	23.55	55	0
82	Blair Tickner	2019	2023	18	11	5*	5.50	0	0	341	19	4/27	28.21	2	0
83	Hamish Bennett	2020	2021	11	1	1*	—	0	0	215	10	3/54	33.10	0	0
84	Devon Conway †	2020	2026	69	1,839	99*	35.36	13	0	—	—	—	—	44	6
85	Kyle Jamieson	2020	2026	32	95	30	10.55	0	0	671	30	3/8	35.76	8	0
86	Jacob Duffy	2020	2026	48	40	9*	8.00	0	0	932	62	4/14	20.25	14	0
87	Finn Allen	2021	2026	62	1,663	137	28.67	7	3	—	—	—	—	23	0
88	Will Young	2021	2024	20	344	56	18.10	2	0	—	—	—	—	6	0
89	Cole McConchie	2021	2026	21	189	31*	18.90	0	0	278	12	3/15	31.25	4	0
90	Rachin Ravindra	2021	2026	52	759	69	20.51	4	0	390	26	4/27	17.46	19	0
91	Ben Sears	2021	2026	28	23	7*	7.66	0	0	519	33	3/14	21.12	4	0
92	Michael Bracewell ‡	2022	2025	47	434	61*	19.72	2	0	623	35	3/5	21.91	25	0
93	Dane Cleaver †	2022	2026	13	222	78*	22.20	2	0	—	—	—	—	9	2
94	Michael Rippon (Note: Michael Rippon also played for Netherlands. Only his records for New Zealand are given above.)	2022	2022	1	—	—	—	—	—	24	2	2/37	18.50	0	0
95	Ben Lister	2023	2026	13	1	1	0.50	0	0	245	11	3/35	30.81	6	0
96	Chad Bowes	2023	2023	11	187	54	17.00	1	0	—	—	—	—	4	0
97	Henry Shipley	2023	2023	5	2	1*	—	0	0	78	2	1/25	70.50	0	0
98	Adithya Ashok	2023	2023	1	—	—	—	—	—	24	1	1/28	28.00	0	0
99	Dean Foxcroft	2023	2026	7	106	34	21.20	0	0	12	0	—	—	2	0
100	Josh Clarkson	2024	2026	13	151	38*	25.16	0	0	48	6	3/9	9.83	3	0
101	Tim Robinson	2024	2026	31	665	106*	26.60	2	1	—	—	—	—	18	0
102	Zak Foulkes	2024	2026	22	100	27*	14.28	0	0	423	22	3/20	28.81	3	0
103	Will O'Rourke	2024	2025	7	0	0	0.00	0	0	162	7	3/27	26.85	1	0
104	Mitchell Hay †	2024	2025	12	89	41*	11.12	0	0	—	—	—	—	25	2
105	Bevon Jacobs	2025	2026	11	183	62*	26.14	1	0	—	—	—	—	8	0
106	Kris Clarke	2026	2026	1	0	0	0.00	0	0	24	1	1/40	40.00	0	0
107	Nick Kelly ‡	2026	2026	7	97	39	16.16	0	0	—	—	—	—	2	0
108	Katene Clarke	2026	2026	4	63	51	15.75	1	0	—	—	—	—	1	0
109	Matthew Fisher	2026	2026	1	—	—	—	—	—	24	0	—	—	0	0
110	Nathan Smith	2026	2026	2	2	2*	—	0	0	30	3	2/14	15.66	1	0
111	Jayden Lennox	2026	2026	1	—	—	—	—	—	18	1	1/28	28.00	0	0

== See also ==
- New Zealand cricket team
- List of New Zealand Test cricketers
- List of New Zealand ODI cricketers
- List of New Zealand sportspeople
