= Matthew O'Rourke =

New Zealand cricketer (born 1967)

Personal information
- Full name: Matthew Harvey O'Rourke
- Born: 25 February 1967 (age 59); Masterton, New Zealand
- Relatives: Patrick O'Rourke (brother); William O'Rourke (nephew)
- Source: ESPNcricinfo, 19 June 2016

Matthew O'Rourke (born 25 February 1967) is a New Zealand former cricketer. He played one first-class match for Auckland in 1991/92.

== See also ==
- List of Auckland representative cricketers
