= Neil Louw =

South African Paralympic athlete

Medal record

Men's para-athletics

Representing South Africa

Paralympic Games
| Bronze medal – third place | 1992 Barcelona | 200 metres - TS4 |
| Bronze medal – third place | 1992 Barcelona | 400 metres - TS4 |

Neil Louw is a paralympic athlete from South Africa competing mainly in category TS4 sprint events.

Neil was part of the South African Paralympic team that travelled to Barcelona for the 1992 Summer Paralympics, there he competed in the 100m, 200m and 400m finishing with bronze medals in both the 200m and 400m.
