= Curtis Heaphy =

New Zealand cricketer

Personal information
- Full name: Curtis George Heaphy
- Born: 28 July 2003 (age 23); Palmerston North, New Zealand
- Batting: Right-handed
- Role: Wicket-keeper batsman

Domestic team information
- Years: Team
- 2022/23–present: Central Districts
- FC debut: 5 November 2022 Central Districts v Northern Districts
- LA debut: 29 November 2023 Central Districts v Canterbury

Career statistics
Competition	FC	LA	T20
Matches	27	32	22
Runs scored	1849	1222	388
Batting average	44.02	53.13	25.86
100s/50s	4/11	3/7	0/2
Top score	190	142	78
Catches/stumpings	22/0	16/0	4/0
- Source: CricInfo, 21 March 2026

Curtis George Heaphy (born 28 July 2003) is a New Zealand cricketer, who is a right-handed wicket-keeper batsman. He plays for Central Districts cricket team in domestic cricket.

== Early life ==
Born in Palmerston North on 28 July 2003, Heaphy was educated at Huntley School and Palmerston North Boys' High School, and is Māori of Ngāi Tahu descent. He started playing cricket at about the age of 7, and represented Palmerston North Boys' High School in inter-school competitions. He was named the Central Districts under-19 player of the year for 2020–21 and 2021–22 seasons. In November 2022, he was named in the New Zealand men's development squad for their matches against domestic A teams.

== Domestic career ==
A right-handed wicket-keeper batsman, Heaphy made his first-class debut for Central Districts on 5 November 2022, against Northern Districts in the 2022–23 Plunket Shield season. In July 2023, he was awarded a full season contract for the first time by Central Districts ahead of the 2023–24 season. He made his List A debut on 29 November 2023, against Canterbury in the 2023–24 Ford Trophy. He made his Twenty20 debut for Central Stags on 22 December 2023, against Northern Brave in the 2023–24 Super Smash. On 9 March 2024, he scored his maiden century in first-class cricket, against Wellington in the 2023–24 Plunket Shield season.
