= Katene Clarke =

New Zealand cricketer (born 1999)

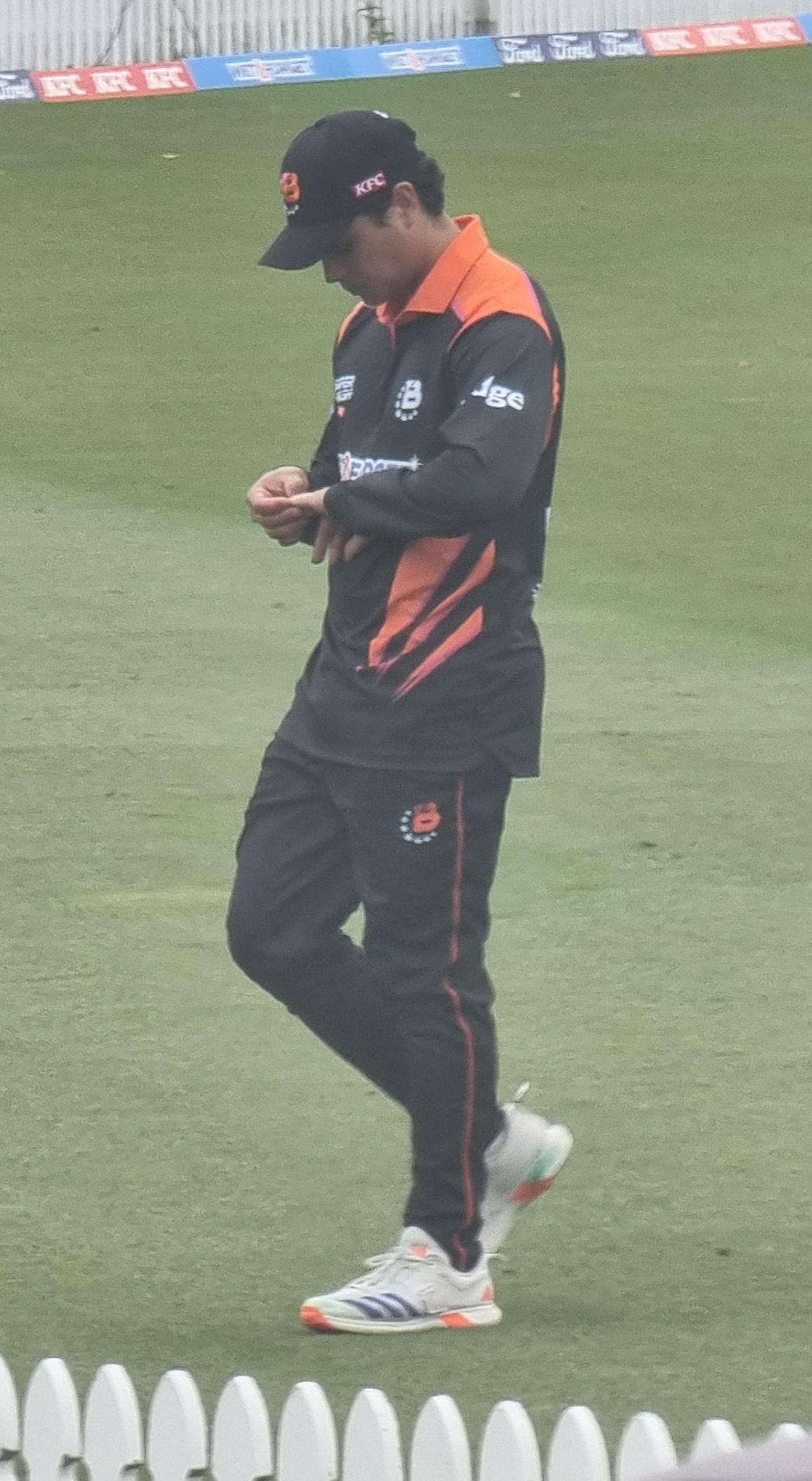
- Clarke playing for Northern Districts in 2025.

Personal information
- Full name: Katene Dalton Clarke
- Born: 21 September 1999 (age 27); Pukekohe, Franklin, New Zealand
- Batting: Right-handed
- Bowling: Right-arm medium-fast
- Role: Batsman

International information
- National side: New Zealand (2026–present)
- T20I debut (cap 108): 21 March 2026 v South Africa
- Last T20I: 2 May 2026 v Bangladesh

Domestic team information
- Years: Team
- 2019/20–present: Northern Districts (squad no. 21)

Career statistics
Competition	T20I	FC	LA	T20
Matches	4	18	56	58
Runs scored	63	658	1,262	1,548
Batting average	15.75	22.68	22.94	29.20
100s/50s	0/1	1/2	0/8	2/7
Top score	51	129	82	106
Catches/stumpings	1/0	17/0	33/0	27/0
- Source: Cricinfo, 27 April 2026

Katene Dalton Clarke (born 21 September 1999) is a New Zealand cricketer. He made his List A debut on 17 November 2019, for Northern Districts in the 2019–20 Ford Trophy. Prior to his List A debut, he was named in New Zealand's squad for the 2018 Under-19 Cricket World Cup. He made his first-class debut on 22 February 2020, for Northern Districts in the 2019–20 Plunket Shield season. He made his Twenty20 debut on 27 December 2020, for Northern Districts, against Central Stags in the 2020–21 Super Smash.

Clarke comes from a sporting family. His grandfather Rauhuia Reuben Clarke, father Te Rau Clarke, and uncle Teina Clarke all played rugby at an international level with the Māori All Blacks, and his aunt Te Aroha Keenan played for the New Zealand national netball team, the Silver Ferns.
