= Jayden Lennox =

New Zealand cricketer (born 1994)

Personal information
- Full name: Jayden Richard Lennox
- Born: 14 December 1994 (age 31); Napier, New Zealand
- Batting: Left-handed
- Bowling: Slow left-arm orthodox

International information
- National side: New Zealand
- ODI debut (cap 225): 14 January 2026 v India
- Last ODI: 21 July 2026 v West Indies
- ODI shirt no.: 25
- Only T20I (cap 111): 2 May 2026 v Bangladesh

Domestic team information
- Years: Team
- 2019/20–present: Central Districts

Career statistics
Competition	ODI	T20I	FC	LA
Matches	10	1	23	71
Runs scored	3	–	429	234
Batting average	1.50	–	19.50	11.70
100s/50s	0/0	–/–	0/1	0/0
Top score	2	–	88	34
Balls bowled	558	18	3,889	3,532
Wickets	22	1	56	98
Bowling average	17.86	28.00	35.10	28.55
5 wickets in innings	1	0	1	1
10 wickets in match	0	0	0	0
Best bowling	5/19	1/28	5/66	5/19
Catches/stumpings	0/–	0/–	16/–	23/–
- Source: Cricinfo, 21 July 2026

Jayden Richard Lennox (born 14 December 1994) is a New Zealand cricketer.

== Domestic career ==
He made his List A debut on 17 November 2019, for Central Districts in the 2019–20 Ford Trophy. He made his Twenty20 debut on 4 January 2021, for Central Districts in the 2020–21 Super Smash. He made his first-class debut on 19 March 2021, for Central Districts in the 2020–21 Plunket Shield season.

== International career ==
In December 2025, Lennox was named in the Black Caps ODI squad to tour India. He made his debut in the second ODI.

== Personal life ==
Lennox is married.
