= Ben Sears =

New Zealand cricketer (born 1998)

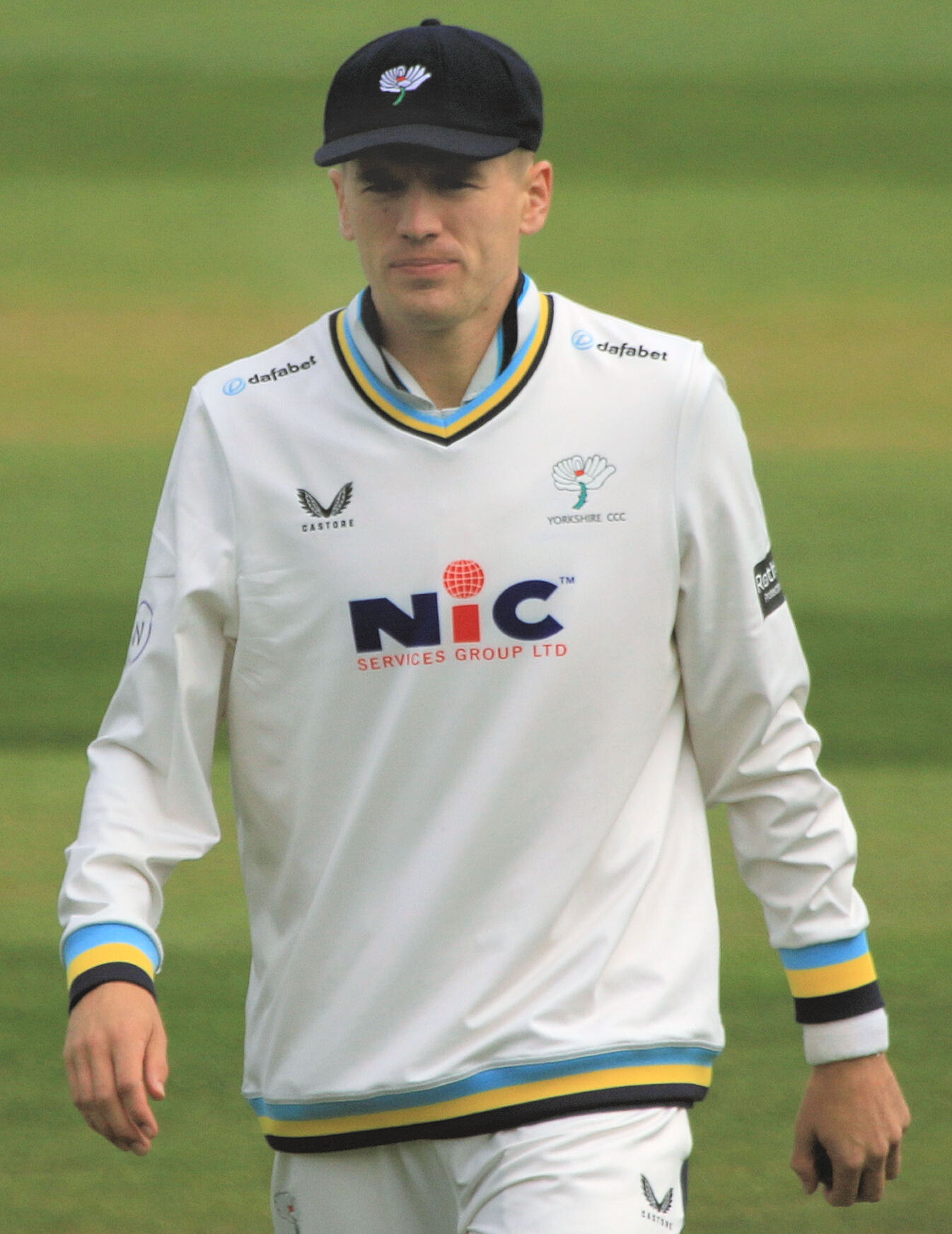
- Sears playing for Yorkshire (2025)

Personal information
- Full name: Benjamin Vincent Sears
- Born: 11 February 1998 (age 28); Lower Hutt, New Zealand
- Batting: Right-handed
- Bowling: Right-arm medium-fast
- Role: Bowler

International information
- National side: New Zealand (2021–present)
- Only Test (cap 287): 8 March 2024 v Australia
- ODI debut (cap 220): 8 February 2025 v Pakistan
- Last ODI: 5 April 2025 v Pakistan
- ODI shirt no.: 14
- T20I debut (cap 91): 3 September 2021 v Bangladesh
- Last T20I: 2 May 2026 v Bangladesh
- T20I shirt no.: 14

Domestic team information
- Years: Team
- 2018/19–present: Wellington
- 2025: Yorkshire
- 2025: Washington Freedom
- 2026: Rawalpindiz

Career statistics
| Competition | Test | ODI | T20I | FC |
|---|---|---|---|---|
| Matches | 1 | 4 | 28 | 24 |
| Runs scored | 0 | 11 | 23 | 263 |
| Batting average | – | 11.00 | 7.66 | 12.52 |
| 100s/50s | 0/0 | 0/0 | 0/0 | 0/0 |
| Top score | 0* | 6 | 7* | 41 |
| Balls bowled | 198 | 206 | 519 | 3228 |
| Wickets | 5 | 10 | 33 | 72 |
| Bowling average | 32.20 | 19.70 | 21.12 | 27.94 |
| 5 wickets in innings | 0 | 2 | 0 | 2 |
| 10 wickets in match | 0 | 0 | 0 | 0 |
| Best bowling | 4/90 | 5/34 | 3/14 | 6/43 |
| Catches/stumpings | 1/– | 1/– | 4/– | 14/– |
Medal record
Men's Cricket
Representing New Zealand
ICC Men's T20 World Cup
| Runner-up | 2026 India & Sri Lanka |
- Source: Cricinfo, 27 May 2026

Benjamin Vincent Sears (born 11 February 1998) is a New Zealand cricketer who plays for the Wellington domestic cricket side. He made his international debut for the New Zealand cricket team in September 2021.

== Career ==
Sears father, Michael Sears was also a cricketer who played for Wellington in the 1990s.

Sears made his List A debut for Wellington in the 2018–19 Ford Trophy on 24 October 2018. Prior to his List A debut, he was named in New Zealand's squad for the 2016 Under-19 Cricket World Cup. He made his first-class debut for Wellington in the 2018–19 Plunket Shield season on 6 December 2018. He made his Twenty20 debut for Wellington in the 2018–19 Super Smash on 31 December 2018.

In June 2020, he was offered a contract by Wellington ahead of the 2020–21 domestic cricket season. In November 2020, Sears was named in the New Zealand A cricket team for practice matches against the touring West Indies team.

In August 2021, Sears was named in New Zealand's Twenty20 International (T20I) squads for their tour of Bangladesh, and their tour of Pakistan. Sears made his T20I debut on 3 September 2021, for New Zealand against Bangladesh.

In August 2022, Sears was named as a replacement for Matt Henry, who was ruled out of the West Indies tour due to rib injury.

In December 2023, he was selected in New Zealand's squad for the 3-match T20 series against Bangladesh. In the third T20 match, he bowled a match-winning spell, claiming 2 wickets for 28 runs off his 4 overs.

In March 2024, he was called into the Test squad as injury cover for the 2nd test against Australia. In the first innings, he dismissed Australian opener Steve Smith with figures of 1-71. In the second innings he dismissed four Australian batsman as New Zealand suffered a close loss. He finished the second innings with figures of 4-90.

In May 2024, he was named as a reserve player in New Zealand’s squad for the 2024 ICC Men's T20 World Cup tournament.

In October 2024, he was named to national squad for Test series against India. Later he was ruled out of the series due to knee injury.

In March 2025, Sears joined Yorkshire County Cricket Club as one of their overseas players for that year's county championship season.
