= Bevon Jacobs =

New Zealand cricketer

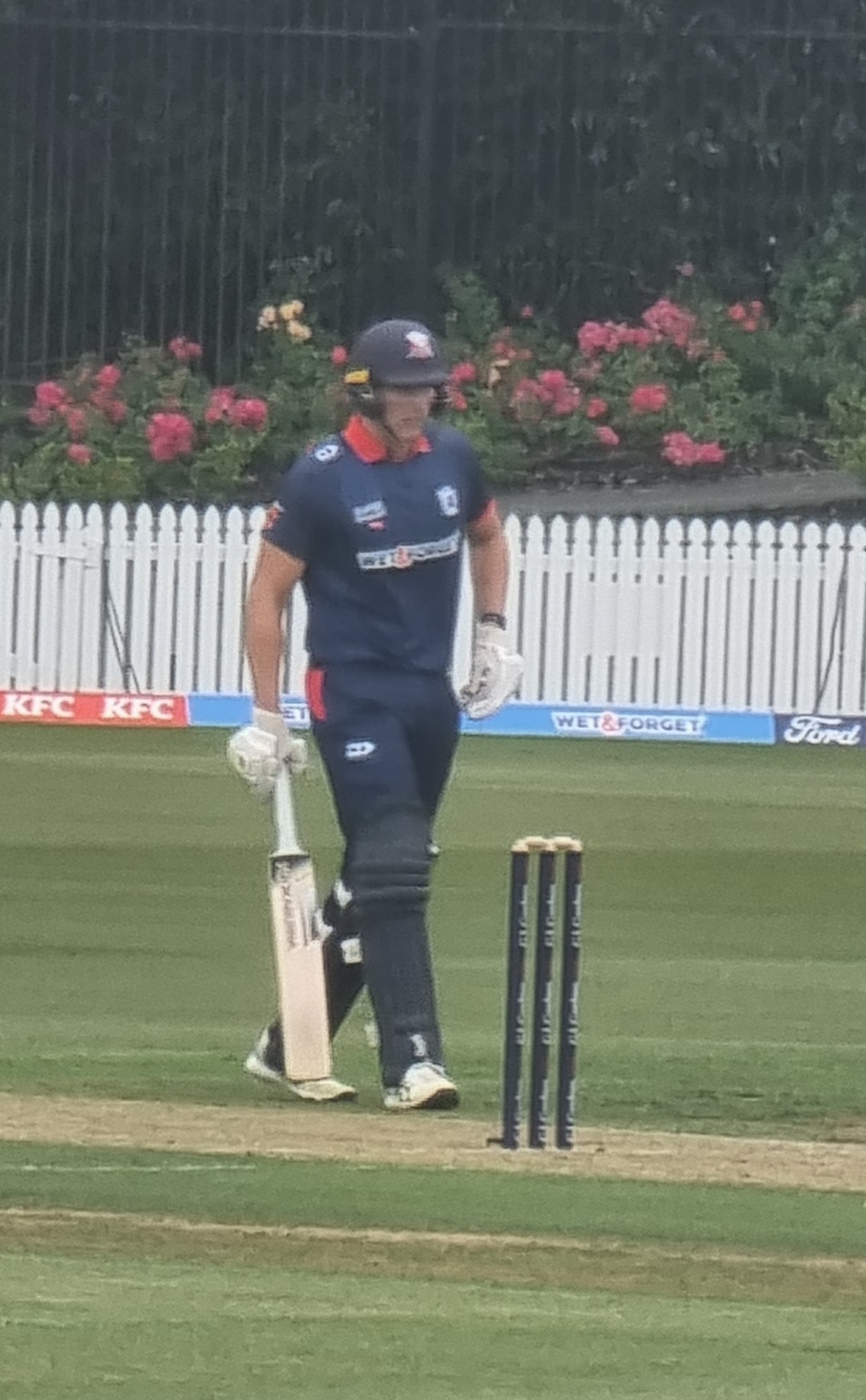
- Jacobs playing for the Auckland Aces in 2025.

Personal information
- Full name: Bevon John Jacobs
- Born: 6 May 2002 (age 24); Pretoria, Gauteng, South Africa
- Batting: Right-handed
- Bowling: Right-arm medium
- Role: Batsman

International information
- National side: New Zealand (2025–present)
- T20I debut (cap 105): 16 July 2025 v South Africa
- Last T20I: 1 November 2026 v India

Domestic team information
- Years: Team
- 2023/24: Canterbury
- 2024/25–present: Auckland
- 2024/25: MI Emirates
- 2025: Mumbai Indians
- 2025: Dubai Capitals (Note: Only for the 2025 Global Super League)
- 2025: Antigua & Barbuda Falcons

Career statistics
Competition	T20I	FC	LA	T20
Matches	16	12	30	60
Runs scored	319	944	603	1,296
Batting average	31.99	44.95	27.40	34.10
100s/50s	0/2	2/7	0/3	0/9
Top score	62*	157	67*	90*
Catches/stumpings	9/–	11/–	15/–	21/–
- Source: ESPNcricinfo, 1 November 2026

Bevon John Jacobs (born 6 May 2002) is a New Zealand cricketer, who is a right-handed batsman. He currently represents the Auckland cricket team, and has previously played for Canterbury.

== Early life and career ==
Jacobs was born on 6 May 2002 at Pretoria, Gauteng in South Africa. He moved to New Zealand with his family when he was three years old. He grew up in Auckland and learned to play cricket from his father. He played for Sydenham Cricket Club in the 2021 Christchurch Metro competition, and scored 178 runs in a match against Old Boys Collegians, recording the highest individual score in the history of the tournament. He also represented Auckland in age-level cricket and Westlake Boys High School in school-level cricket. Later, he moved to Christchurch, and is currently studying sport and recreation management at Lincoln University.

== Domestic career ==
Jacobs made his List A debut for Canterbury on 25 November 2023, against Wellington in the 2023–24 Ford Trophy. He made his Twenty20 debut for Canterbury Kings on 19 December 2023, against Auckland in the 2023–24 Super Smash. He smashed 42 runs off just 20 balls on his T20 debut match.

Jacobs signed with Auckland ahead of the 2024/25 domestic season.

In the 2024 IPL Auction, Jacobs was bought by the Mumbai Indians for ₹30 lakh (NZ$61,000)

== International career ==
Jacobs was selected as part of the Black Caps' squad for the T20I series against Sri Lanka in early 2025, but did not feature in any of the games.
