= Matthew Fisher (New Zealand cricketer) =

New Zealand cricketer (born 1999)

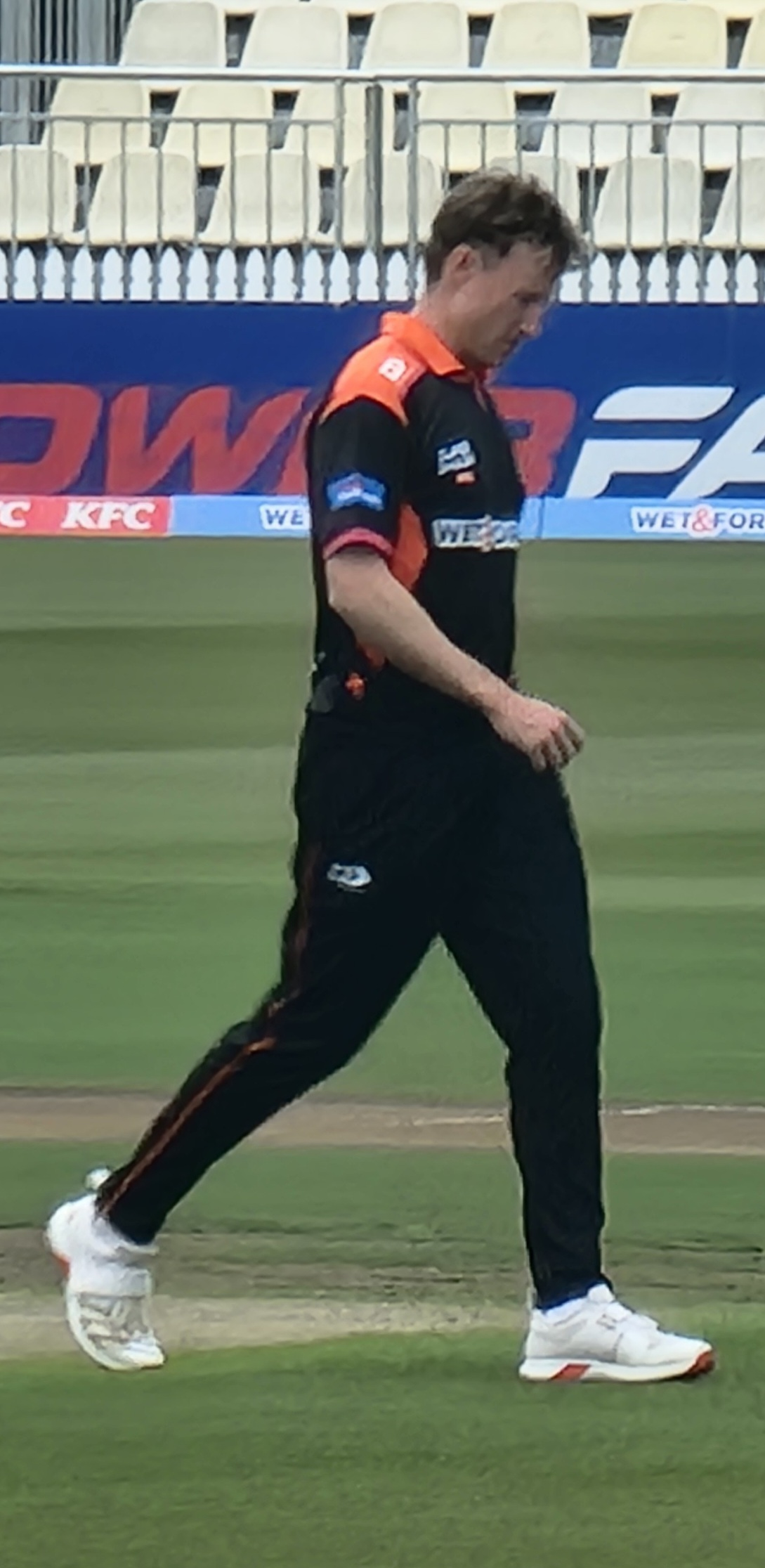
- Fisher playing for Northern Districts in 2025.

Personal information
- Full name: Matthew John Fisher
- Born: 10 November 1999 (age 27); Auckland, New Zealand
- Batting: Right-handed
- Bowling: Right-arm fast-medium
- Role: Bowler

International information
- National side: New Zealand (2025–present)
- Only Test (cap 290): 7 August 2025 v Zimbabwe
- ODI debut: 11 July 2026 v West Indies
- Last ODI: 15 November 2026 v India
- T20I debut (cap 109): 27 April 2026 v Bangladesh
- Last T20I: 30 October 2026 v India

Domestic team information
- Years: Team
- 2019/20–present: Northern Districts (squad no. 32)

Career statistics
Competition	Test	ODI	T20I	FC
Matches	1	7	3	16
Runs scored	–	6	–	75
Batting average	–	2.00	–	10.71
100s/50s	–/–	0/0	–/–	0/0
Top score	–	3*	–	28*
Balls bowled	71	239	54	2,199
Wickets	2	9	3	60
Bowling average	19.00	21.11	38.66	22.21
5 wickets in innings	0	0	0	3
10 wickets in match	0	–	0	0
Best bowling	1/16	3/31	2/40	6/43
Catches/stumpings	0/–	2/–	7/–	7/–
- Source: Cricinfo, 15 November 2026

Matthew John Fisher (born 10 November 1999) is a New Zealand cricketer who plays for Northern Districts in domestic cricket as a right-hand batter and right-arm fast-medium bowler.

He made his Twenty20 debut on 13 December 2019, for Northern Districts in the 2019–20 Super Smash. Prior to his T20 debut, he was named in New Zealand's squad for the 2018 Under-19 Cricket World Cup. He made his List A debut on 8 December 2020, for Northern Districts in the 2020–21 Ford Trophy. He made his first-class debut on 27 March 2021, for Northern Districts in the 2020–21 Plunket Shield season.

In July 2025, Fisher earned his maiden call-up for the national team for the Test series against Zimbabwe.

Fisher has completed a Bachelor of Laws degree at the University of Otago.
