= Kristian Clarke =

New Zealand cricketer (born 2001)

Personal information
- Full name: Kristian David Charles Clarke
- Born: 6 March 2001 (age 25); Te Awamutu, Waikato, New Zealand
- Batting: Right-handed
- Bowling: Right-arm medium-fast

International information
- National side: New Zealand (2026–present)
- ODI debut (cap 224): 11 January 2026 v India
- Last ODI: 15 November 2026 v India
- ODI shirt no.: 34
- Only T20I (cap 106): 21 January 2026 v India
- T20I shirt no.: 34

Domestic team information
- Years: Team
- 2021/22–present: Northern Districts
- 2026: Gloucestershire

Career statistics
Competition	ODI	T20I	FC	LA
Matches	6	1	35	43
Runs scored	77	0	1,291	470
Batting average	19.25	0.00	25.31	21.36
100s/50s	0/0	0/0	1/3	1/0
Top score	24*	0	103	100*
Balls bowled	204	24	5,815	1,869
Wickets	7	1	98	63
Bowling average	31.71	40.00	34.16	28.80
5 wickets in innings	0	0	5	1
10 wickets in match	0	0	0	0
Best bowling	3/54	1/40	6/45	5/67
Catches/stumpings	3/–	0/–	16/–	14/–
- Source: Cricinfo, 15 November 2026

Kristian David Charles Clarke (born 6 March 2001) is a New Zealand cricketer who has played first-class cricket for Northern Districts since the 2021–22 season. In January 2026 he played his first match for New Zealand in a One Day International against India in Vadodara.

Clarke was born in Te Awamutu in Waikato. A medium-fast bowler and useful lower-order batsman, he has played Hawke Cup cricket for Waikato Valley since 2016–17. He was a member of the New Zealand team that competed in the 2020 Under-19 Cricket World Cup; he won the player of the match award in the match against West Indies Under-19 when he took 4 for 25 and made 46 not out to take New Zealand by a narrow victory into the semi-finals.

Clarke made his first-class debut in the 2021–22 Plunket Shield, scoring 63 not out and 11 not out and taking three wickets. His best first-class bowling figures are 6 for 45 against Auckland in the 2023–24 Plunket Shield. His best one-day figures are 5 for 67 against Wellington in the 2023–24 Ford Trophy. He was the leading wicket-taker in the 2023–24 Ford Trophy, with 18 wickets.

In June 2026, he joined Gloucestershire for two County Championship matches.
