= Adithya Ashok =

New Zealand cricketer

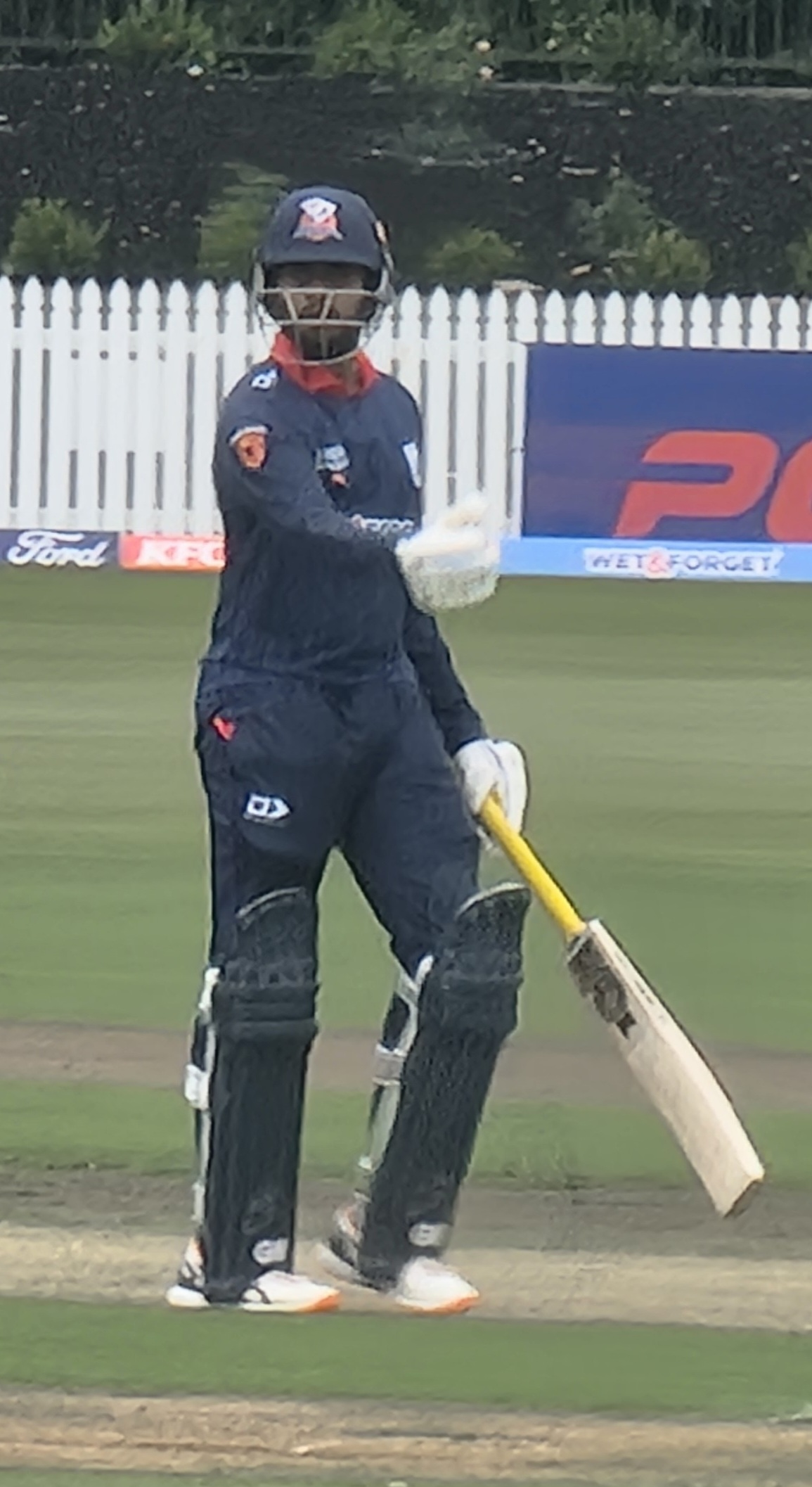
- Ashok playing for the Auckland Aces in 2025.

Personal information
- Born: 5 September 2002 (age 24); Vellore, Tamil Nadu, India
- Batting: Right-handed
- Bowling: Right-arm leg-break and googly
- Role: Bowler

International information
- National side: New Zealand (2023–present)
- ODI debut (cap 215): 20 December 2023 v Bangladesh
- Last ODI: 11 January 2026 v India
- ODI shirt no.: 1
- Only T20I (cap 98): 20 August 2023 v United Arab Emirates

Domestic team information
- Years: Team
- 2021/22–present: Auckland (squad no. 1)

Career statistics
Competition	ODI	T20I	FC	LA
Matches	3	1	23	40
Runs scored	10	–	359	282
Batting average	10.00	–	12.37	18.80
100s/50s	0/0	–/–	0/0	0/1
Top score	10	–	44	61*
Balls bowled	97	24	4,531	1,948
Wickets	2	1	78	53
Bowling average	60.00	28.00	35.07	33.56
5 wickets in innings	0	0	5	0
10 wickets in match	0	0	0	0
Best bowling	1/55	1/28	7/103	4/25
Catches/stumpings	1/–	0/–	12/–	10/–
- Source: Cricinfo, 11 January 2026

Adithya Ashok (born 5 September 2002) is a New Zealand cricketer.

== Early life ==
Ashok was born on 5 September 2002 in Vellore, Tamil Nadu. He moved to New Zealand with his family when he was four, and later attended Mount Albert Grammar School in Auckland.

== Career ==
Ashok represented New Zealand in the 2020 Under-19 Cricket World Cup. He made his Twenty20 debut on 17 December 2021, for Auckland in the 2021–22 Men's Super Smash. He made his List A debut on 1 January 2022, for Auckland in the 2021–22 Ford Trophy. He made his first-class debut for Auckland in the 2022–23 Plunket Shield season, taking 5 for 106 in Central Districts' only innings of the match.

In March 2023, Ashok earned his maiden call-up to the New Zealand A cricket team for their first-class series against Australia. In July 2023, he earned his maiden call-up to the New Zealand's Twenty20 International (T20I) squad for their series against United Arab Emirates. He made his T20I debut against UAE, on 20 August 2023. In December 2023, he was named in New Zealand's One Day International (ODI) squad for their series against Bangladesh. He made his ODI debut on 20 December 2023, during the second ODI.
