= Dean Foxcroft =

South African born New Zealand cricketer (born 1998)

Personal information
- Born: 20 April 1998 (age 28); Pretoria, Gauteng, South Africa
- Batting: Right-handed
- Bowling: Right-arm off break
- Role: All-rounder

International information
- National side: New Zealand
- Only Test (cap 294): 27 May 2026 v Ireland
- ODI debut (cap 212): 26 September 2023 v Bangladesh
- Last ODI: 15 November 2026 v India
- T20I debut (cap 99): 20 August 2023 v United Arab Emirates
- Last T20I: 2 May 2026 v Bangladesh

Domestic team information
- Years: Team
- 2018/19,2025/26: Central Districts
- 2019/20–2024/25: Otago
- 2022: Lahore Qalandars (squad no. 11)

Career statistics
Competition	Test	ODI	T20I	FC
Matches	1	8	7	46
Runs scored	98	210	106	2,595
Batting average	98.00	30.00	21.20	34.14
100s/50s	0/1	0/2	0/0	2/18
Top score	98	75	34	174
Balls bowled	6	135	12	4,019
Wickets	0	2	0	64
Bowling average	–	51.00	–	34.07
5 wickets in innings	–	0	–	2
10 wickets in match	–	0	–	0
Best bowling	–	1/25	–	6/84
Catches/stumpings	0/–	3/–	2/–	31/–
- Source: CricInfo, 15 November 2026

Dean Foxcroft (born 20 April 1998) is a South African born-New Zealand cricketer who plays domestic cricket in New Zealand.

He made his List A debut for Central Districts in the 2018–19 Ford Trophy on 4 November 2018. Prior to his List A debut, he was named in South Africa's squad for the 2016 Under-19 Cricket World Cup. He made his first-class debut for Central Districts in the 2018–19 Plunket Shield season on 6 December 2018. He made his Twenty20 debut for Central Districts in the 2018–19 Super Smash on 31 December 2018.

In June 2020, he was offered a contract by Otago ahead of the 2020–21 domestic cricket season. However, due to the COVID-19 pandemic, Foxcroft was left stranded in South Africa for the first part of the 2020–21 season. In July 2021, Foxcroft was forced again to miss out playing domestic cricket in New Zealand, after his immigration was not approved due to border restrictions in relation to the pandemic.

== International career ==
In March 2023, he earned his maiden call-up to the New Zealand A cricket team for their first-class series against Australia. He made his ODI debut against Bangladesh in September 2023.

In July 2023, he was earned his maiden call-up to the New Zealand Twenty20 International (T20I) squad for their series against United Arab Emirates. He made his T20I debut during the series.

On May 27, 2026, Foxcroft made his Test debut against Ireland in Belfast.
