= Josh Clarkson =

New Zealand cricketer (born 1997)

Personal information
- Full name: Joshua Andrew Clarkson
- Born: 21 January 1997 (age 29); Christchurch, New Zealand
- Batting: Right-handed
- Bowling: Right-arm medium
- Role: Batting all-rounder

International information
- National side: New Zealand
- ODI debut (cap 213): 17 December 2023 v Bangladesh
- Last ODI: 23 April 2026 v Bangladesh
- ODI shirt no.: 26
- T20I debut (cap 100): 21 February 2024 v Australia
- Last T20I: 2 May 2026 v Bangladesh
- T20I shirt no.: 26

Domestic team information
- Years: Team
- 2015/16-present: Central Districts

Career statistics
Competition	ODI	T20I	FC	LA
Matches	6	13	38	108
Runs scored	37	151	1,531	2,371
Batting average	7.40	25.16	28.88	28.91
100s/50s	0/0	0/0	3/5	4/10
Top score	16	38*	166*	111*
Balls bowled	126	48	3,666	2,229
Wickets	3	6	60	73
Bowling average	43.33	9.83	35.15	27.56
5 wickets in innings	0	0	0	1
10 wickets in match	0	0	0	0
Best bowling	2/24	3/9	4/33	5/32
Catches/stumpings	2/–	3/–	24/–	42/–
- Source: Cricinfo, 2 May 2026

Joshua Andrew Clarkson (born 21 January 1997) is a New Zealand first-class cricketer who plays for Central Districts. In December 2015 he was named in New Zealand's squad for the 2016 Under-19 Cricket World Cup. He made his List A debut on 27 December 2015 in the 2015–16 Ford Trophy. Clarkson was educated at Nelson College from 2012 to 2014. In June 2018, he was awarded a contract with Central Districts for the 2018–19 season. On 27 December 2020, Clarkson played in his 50th Twenty20 match, during the 2020–21 Super Smash.
