= Zak Foulkes =

New Zealand cricketer (born 2002)

Personal information
- Full name: Zakary Glen Foulkes
- Born: 5 June 2002 (age 24); Christchurch, Canterbury, New Zealand
- Height: 1.82 m (6 ft 0 in)
- Batting: Right-handed
- Bowling: Right-arm medium
- Role: All-rounder

International information
- National side: New Zealand (2024–present)
- Test debut (cap 291): 7 August 2025 v Zimbabwe
- Last Test: 25 June 2026 v England
- ODI debut (cap 219): 19 November 2024 v Sri Lanka
- Last ODI: 18 January 2026 v India
- T20I debut (cap 102): 21 April 2024 v Pakistan
- Last T20I: 25 March 2026 v South Africa

Domestic team information
- Years: Team
- 2020–present: Canterbury
- 2024: Warwickshire
- 2025: Durham

Career statistics
Competition	Test	ODI	T20I	FC
Matches	6	9	22	27
Runs scored	45	49	100	605
Batting average	15.00	24.50	14.28	17.79
100s/50s	0/0	0/0	0/0	0/3
Top score	23*	22*	27*	75*
Balls bowled	1,077	360	423	4,239
Wickets	21	13	22	82
Bowling average	25.61	25.92	28.81	27.50
5 wickets in innings	1	0	0	3
10 wickets in match	0	0	0	0
Best bowling	5/37	4/41	3/20	5/37
Catches/stumpings	3/–	3/–	3/–	16/–
- Source: ESPNcricinfo, 29 June 2026

Zakary Glen Foulkes (born 5 June 2002) is a New Zealand professional cricket all-rounder who plays as right-arm medium bowler and right-handed batter for the New Zealand national team and Canterbury. As of June 2026, he is signed with Chennai Super Kings in the Indian Premier League.

== Early life ==
Foulkes was born in Christchurch in 2002 into a cricketing family; his father, Glen Foulkes, and two brothers, Liam and Robbie Foulkes, have all played for Canterbury Country. Foulkes was educated at St Andrew's College in Christchurch where he played cricket, and played for Canterbury age-group teams and the New Zealand development team.

Whilst at school, Foulkes was part of the St Andrew's College team which won the 2019 Gillette Cup, a national secondary school competition. He was the team's leading run scorer and wicket-taker in the competition, taking nine wickets and scoring 267 runs, including a century against Rosmini College.

In October 2021, he was called up to the Canterbury A team for the 2021–22 season Provincial A matches, before playing for Canterbury Country in the Hawke Cup, scoring 92 runs and taking six wickets on debut.

== Professional cricket ==
Foulkes made his representative debut for Canterbury in February 2022 in the 2021–22 Ford Trophy, before making his first-class debut the following month against Auckland in the Plunket Shield. He was awarded his first professional contract in July 2022, and the following month played for Wynnum-Manly in the T20 Max competition in Queensland.

He made his Twenty20 debut for Canterbury on 8 January 2023 against Auckland in the 2022–23 Men's Super Smash. He was the team's joint highest wicket-taker with 12 wickets from ten matches as the team reached the competition's final. In 2024 he played Twenty20 cricket for Warwickshire County Cricket Club in England, before playing for Durham the following season.

In December 2025, he was bought by the Chennai Super Kings in the auction for the 2026 Indian Premier League tournament for his base price of ₹75 lakh (equivalent to ₹77 lakh or US$83,000 in 2026).

== International career ==
Foulkes was selected for the New Zealand tour of Pakistan in April 2024 as a replacement for the injured Adam Milne, making his international debut and playing in two Twenty20 Internationals. In November, he was selected for the tour of Sri Lanka and played in a further two T20Is before making his One Day International debut in the third ODI of the series; he neither batted or bowled as the match was rained off midway through the first innings. He made his Test match debut during New Zealand's tour of Zimbabwe in August 2025, taking nine wickets, including a five-wicket haul, on debut, the best bowling figures by a New Zealander on Test debut.
