= Will O'Rourke (cricketer) =

New Zealand cricketer (born 2001)

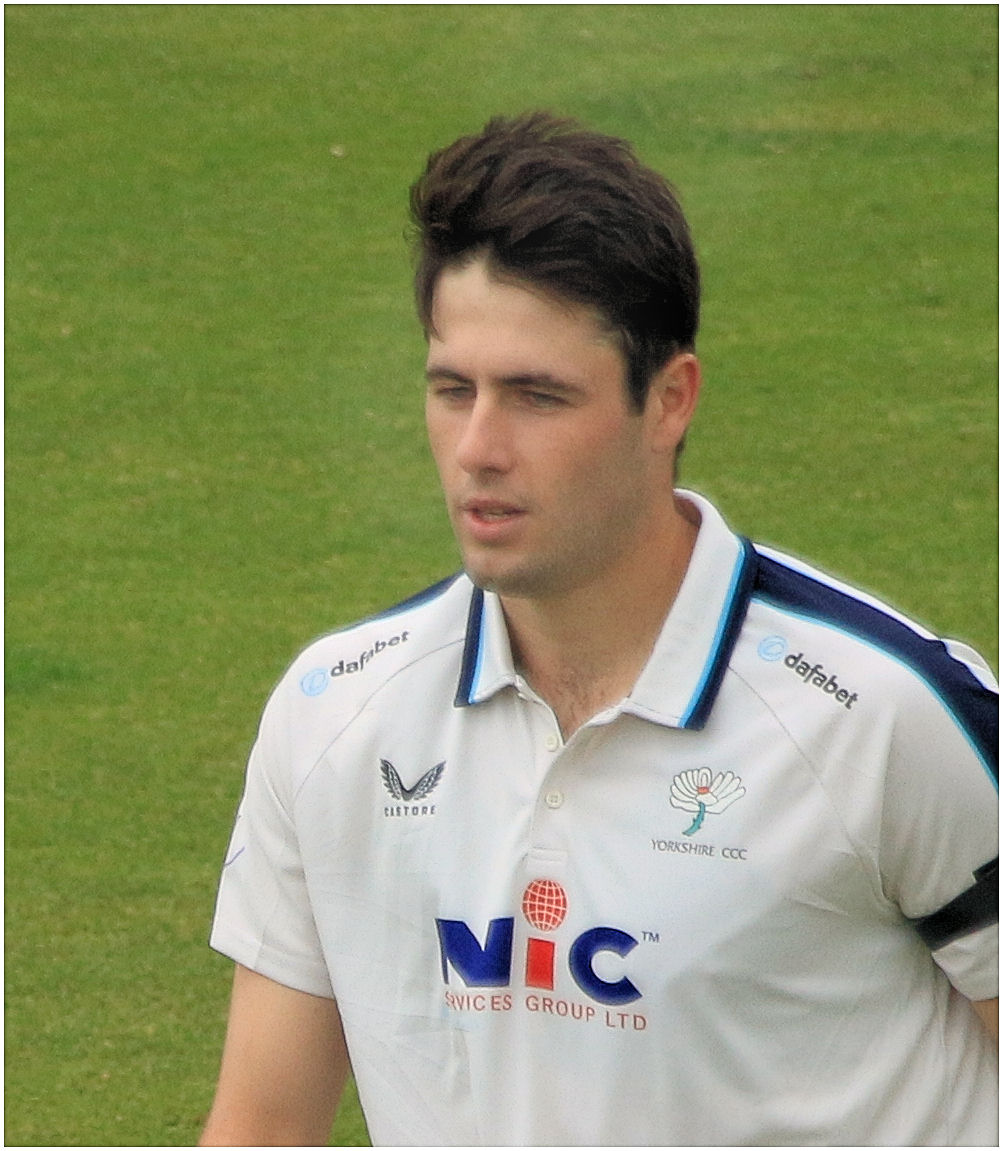
- O'Rourke playing for Yorkshire in 2025

Personal information
- Full name: William Peter O'Rourke
- Born: 6 August 2001 (age 25); Kingston upon Thames, London, England
- Height: 1.97 m (6 ft 6 in)
- Batting: Right-handed
- Bowling: Right-arm fast
- Role: Bowler
- Relatives: Paddy O'Rourke (father); Matthew O'Rourke (uncle)

International information
- National side: New Zealand (2023–present)
- Test debut (cap 286): 13 February 2024 v South Africa
- Last Test: 25 June 2026 v England
- ODI debut (cap 214): 17 December 2023 v Bangladesh
- Last ODI: 23 April 2026 v Bangladesh
- ODI shirt no.: 2
- T20I debut (cap 103): 21 April 2024 v Pakistan
- Last T20I: 24 July 2025 v Zimbabwe
- T20I shirt no.: 2

Domestic team information
- Years: Team
- 2021/22–present: Canterbury
- 2025: Lucknow Super Giants
- 2025: Yorkshire

Career statistics
Competition	Test	ODI	T20I	FC
Matches	14	20	7	31
Runs scored	38	13	0	106
Batting average	3.80	3.25	0.00	6.23
100s/50s	0/0	0/0	0/0	0/0
Top score	5*	6	0	17*
Balls bowled	2,047	982	162	5,088
Wickets	49	27	7	106
Bowling average	24.55	34.14	26.85	26.53
5 wickets in innings	2	0	0	2
10 wickets in match	0	0	0	0
Best bowling	5/34	4/43	3/27	5/34
Catches/stumpings	6/–	4/–	1/–	12/–
Medal record
Men's Cricket
Representing New Zealand
ICC Champions Trophy
Runner-up	2025 Pakistan
- Source: ESPNcricinfo, 29 June 2026

William Peter O'Rourke (born 6 August 2001) is a New Zealand professional cricket right-arm fast bowler who plays for the New Zealand national team and Canterbury. He made his senior international debut in 2023.

== Early and personal life ==
O'Rourke was born at Kingston upon Thames in London in 2001. His father, Paddy O'Rourke, played as a fast bowler for Wellington between the 1989–90 and 1991–92 seasons and his uncle, Matthew O'Rourke, played a single senior match for Auckland in 1991–92. The family had moved to England before O'Rourke's birth and, when he was around five years old, moved back to New Zealand, settling in Auckland. He played cricket from a young age and made appearances for Auckland age-group sides from the 2017–18 season until 2019–20 before moving to the South Island to study at the University of Canterbury.

== Early career ==
In December 2019, O'Rourke was named in New Zealand's squad for the 2020 Under-19 Cricket World Cup. After impressing for his club side Burnside West Christchurch University Cricket Club, he was called into the Canterbury 'A' team during the 2020–21 season, taking 10 wickets for the side during the National Provincial A Tournament. In January 2021, he played two Twenty20 matches for a New Zealand XI against the touring Pakistan Shaheens.

== Domestic career ==
After the end of the 2020–21 season, O'Rourke was awarded a first domestic contract by Canterbury Cricket. He made his List A debut for Canterbury on 3 January 2022, playing against Otago in the 2021–22 Ford Trophy, before going on to make his Twenty20 debut on 7 January against Auckland and his first-class debut on 20 March against Central Districts.

The following season, he was the joint-highest wicket-taker for Canterbury in the 2022–23 Super Smash with 12 wickets from ten matches, with the team reaching the final of the competition. He was the team's leading wicket-taker in the 2022–23 Ford Trophy with 13 wickets from nine matches, including figures of 3 for 47 against Otago, helping Canterbury to qualify for the final.

On 2 February 2024, he took his maiden five-wicket haul in List A cricket, against Otago in the 2023–24 Ford Trophy. His bowling figures of 6 for 20 were also the second best figures by a Canterbury player in List A cricket.

== International career ==
In March 2023, O'Rourke was named in the New Zealand A squad for their first-class series against Australia A and in December 2023 he was called up to the New Zealand squad for the first time ahead of a One Day International (ODI) series against Bangladesh. He made his ODI debut during the series, becoming the first England-born cricketer to play for New Zealand since Roger Twose in the 1990s.

The following month, O'Rourke was called into New Zealand's Test squad for their series against South Africa. He made his Test debut on 13 February 2024 in the second match of the series, taking a five-wicket haul in South Africa's second innings and finishing the match with figures of nine wickets for 93 runs (9/93), recording the best match-bowling figures by a New Zealander on Test debut.

In January 2025, he was named in New Zealand's squad for the 2025 ICC Champions Trophy.

== Playing style ==
O'Rourke is known for his ability to generate extra bounce from his tall frame. A fast bowler who can reach delivery speeds of 150 kilometres per hour (93 mph), his bowling style has been compared to that of Kyle Jamieson, another tall New Zealand fast bowler; O'Rourke has spent time working alongside Jamieson to develop his approach to bowling.
