= Nathan Smith (New Zealand cricketer) =

New Zealand cricketer (born 1998)

- Smith playing for New Zealand in 2026

Personal information
- Full name: Nathan Gregory Smith
- Born: 15 July 1998 (age 28); Dunedin, New Zealand
- Batting: Right-handed
- Bowling: Right-arm medium-fast
- Role: All-rounder

International information
- National side: New Zealand (2024–present)
- Test debut (cap 288): 28 November 2024 v England
- Last Test: 25 June 2026 v England
- ODI debut (cap 218): 13 November 2024 v Sri Lanka
- Last ODI: 7 November 2026 v India
- ODI shirt no.: 10
- T20I debut (cap 110): 27 April 2026 v Bangladesh
- Last T20I: 1 November 2026 v India

Domestic team information
- Years: Team
- 2015/16–2020/21: Otago
- 2021/22–2024/25: Wellington
- 2024: Worcestershire (squad no. 20)
- 2025: Surrey

Career statistics
Competition	Test	ODI	T20I	FC
Matches	8	23	6	69
Runs scored	210	119	8	2,448
Batting average	17.50	9.21	–	26.32
100s/50s	0/0	0/0	0/0	1/15
Top score	42	21*	6*	114
Balls bowled	1,254	875	102	10,562
Wickets	34	25	6	208
Bowling average	25.26	35.96	29.33	25.55
5 wickets in innings	2	0	0	10
10 wickets in match	0	0	0	0
Best bowling	6/40	4/42	2/14	6/25
Catches/stumpings	2/–	14/—	5/–	34/–
Medal record
Men's Cricket
Representing New Zealand
ICC Champions Trophy
Runner-up	2025 Pakistan
- Source: Cricinfo, 7 November 2026

Nathan Gregory Smith (born 15 July 1998) is a New Zealand cricket all-rounder who plays as a right-arm medium-fast bowler and right-handed batter. He represents the New Zealand national team and Wellington.

== Career ==
Smith made his first-class debut for Otago on 30 March 2016 in the 2015–16 Plunket Shield. Prior to his first-class debut, Smith was named in New Zealand's squad for the 2016 Under-19 Cricket World Cup. He made his Twenty20 (T20) debut for Otago on 26 December 2016 in the 2016–17 Super Smash. He made his List A debut for Otago on 25 January 2017 in the 2016–17 Ford Trophy.

In June 2018, he was awarded a contract with Otago for the 2018–19 season. In December 2019 he took 5 for 14 off 3.4 overs in Otago's T20 victory over Northern Districts. In June 2020, he was offered a contract by Otago ahead of the 2020–21 domestic cricket season. In November 2020, Smith was named in the New Zealand A cricket team for practice matches against the touring West Indies team.

Smith has played Hawke Cup cricket for North Otago since 2014. In February 2021 he took six wickets when North Otago defeated Nelson by an innings to win the title.

In January 2024, Smith signed for Worcestershire County Cricket Club to play for the 2024 English cricket season. He took 27 wickets in the County Championship before his spell at the county was cut short following a hamstring injury.

Smith made his Test debut against England in Christchurch in November 2024.

In December 2024, it was announced he had signed to play for Surrey in the 2025 English season.

== Personal life ==
Smith is in a relationship with fellow New Zealand international cricketer Amelia Kerr. The couple met while playing for Wellington cricket team and Wellington Blaze, respectively, in 2021–22. Since then, their profiles have risen substantially: by 2026, Smith was starring in that season's New Zealand men's team's Test tour of England, Kerr was captaining the defending champions in the 2026 Women's T20 World Cup, and the two players were being described by ESPNcricinfo as "New Zealand cricket's power couple".
