= Nick Kelly (cricketer) =

New Zealand cricketer (born 1993)

Personal information
- Full name: Nicholas Frederick Kelly
- Born: 25 July 1993 (age 33); Melbourne, Australia
- Batting: Left-handed
- Bowling: Slow left-arm orthodox
- Role: Top-order batter

International information
- National side: New Zealand (2025—present)
- ODI debut (cap 221): 29 March 2025 v Pakistan
- Last ODI: 15 November 2026 v India
- T20I debut (cap 107): 15 March 2026 v South Africa
- Last T20I: 2 May 2026 v Bangladesh

Domestic team information
- Years: Team
- 2015/16–2018/19: Northern Districts
- 2019/20–2021/22: Otago
- 2020: St Kitts and Nevis Patriots
- 2022/23–2025/26: Wellington
- 2026: Leicestershire
- 2026/27-: Northern Districts

Career statistics
Competition	ODI	T20I	FC	LA
Matches	10	7	77	122
Runs scored	293	97	5,051	3,566
Batting average	29.30	16.16	38.85	31.55
100s/50s	0/3	0/0	14/22	6/28
Top score	83	21	234*	120
Balls bowled	–	–	114	48
Wickets	–	–	0	2
Bowling average	–	–	–	30.00
5 wickets in innings	–	–	–	0
10 wickets in match	–	–	–	0
Best bowling	–	–	–	2/55
Catches/stumpings	2/–	2/–	61/–	55/–
- Source: CricketArchive, 15 November 2026

Nicholas Frederick Kelly (born 25 July 1993) is an Australian-born New Zealand cricketer who plays for Wellington. He made his first-class debut on 23 October 2015 in the 2015–16 Plunket Shield. He made his List A debut on 6 January 2016 in the 2015–16 Ford Trophy. In June 2018, he was awarded a contract with Northern Districts for the 2018–19 season.

In June 2020, he was offered a contract by Otago ahead of the 2020–21 domestic cricket season.

On 29 March 2025 he made his international debut for the New Zealand national side in a One Day International against Pakistan, scoring 15 runs. He returned to the New Zealand ODI squad against Bangladesh in April 2026, playing an impressive innings of 83 runs in the second match albeit in a losing cause.

In April 2026, Kelly signed a contract to play for Leicestershire County Cricket Club from mid-May until the end of that year's English county season.
