= Mitchell Hay =

New Zealand cricketer (born 2000)

Personal information
- Full name: Mitchell James Hay
- Born: 20 August 2000 (age 26); Christchurch, New Zealand
- Batting: Right-handed
- Role: Wicket-keeper Batsman

International information
- National side: New Zealand (2024–present)
- Only Test (cap 292): 10 December 2025 v West Indies
- ODI debut (cap 216): 13 November 2024 v Sri Lanka
- Last ODI: 18 January 2026 v India
- T20I debut (cap 104): 9 November 2024 v Sri Lanka
- Last T20I: 9 November 2025 v West Indies

Domestic team information
- Years: Team
- 2020/21–present: Canterbury
- 2026: Nottinghamshire

Career statistics
Competition	Test	ODI	T20I	FC
Matches	1	10	12	39
Runs scored	61	186	89	2,277
Batting average	61.00	31.00	11.12	42.16
100s/50s	0/1	0/1	0/0	1/19
Top score	61	99*	41*	146
Catches/stumpings	3/–	14/–	25/2	123/4
- Source: Cricinfo, 26 September 2026

Mitchell James Hay (born 20 August 2000) is a New Zealand international cricketer. A member of the Burnside West Christchurch University Cricket Club he attended Christchurch Boys' High School and represented the school in three Gillette Cup National Secondary Schools tournaments. He made his List A debut on 13 December 2020, for Canterbury in the 2020–21 Ford Trophy. He made his Twenty20 debut on 10 December 2021, for Canterbury in the 2021–22 Super Smash. He made his first-class debut on 29 March 2022, for Canterbury in the 2021–22 Plunket Shield season.

== Career ==
In March 2023, he earned his maiden call-up to the New Zealand A cricket team for their first-class series against Australia. On 17 March 2024, he scored his maiden century in first-class cricket, against Northern Districts in the 2023–24 Plunket Shield season.

In July 2024, he trained at Chennai Super Kings Academy in Chennai for the series against Afghanistan, Sri Lanka and India. In October 2024, he received his maiden call-up for national team for the ODI and T20I series against Sri Lanka. He made his Twenty20 International (T20I) debut on 9 November 2024 against Sri Lanka. On 10 November, the second match of the series, he set a new record for the most dismissals (6) by a wicket-keeper in a T20I innings.

Hay made his Test match debut for New Zealand against the West Indies at Basin Reserve in Wellington in December 2025, scoring 61 in his team's first innings.

In September 2026, he agreed a short-term contract with Nottinghamshire to play in the final three matches of that year's English County Championship season.
