= Ben Lister =

New Zealand cricketer (born 1996)

Personal information
- Full name: Benjamin George Lister
- Born: 1 January 1996 (age 30); Henderson, Auckland, New Zealand
- Batting: Right-handed
- Bowling: Left-arm medium
- Role: Bowler

International information
- National side: New Zealand
- ODI debut (cap 211): 5 May 2023 v Pakistan
- Last ODI: 23 April 2026 v Bangladesh
- ODI shirt no.: 17
- T20I debut (cap 95): 1 February 2023 v India
- Last T20I: 27 April 2026 v Bangladesh
- T20I shirt no.: 17

Domestic team information
- Years: Team
- 2017/18–present: Auckland (squad no. 12)
- 2024: Nottinghamshire

Career statistics
Competition	ODI	T20I	FC	LA
Matches	4	13	39	71
Runs scored	12	1	251	153
Batting average	12.00	0.50	9.65	11.76
100s/50s	0/0	0/0	0/0	0/0
Top score	5*	1	42	30
Balls bowled	226	245	5,285	3,221
Wickets	6	11	93	83
Bowling average	36.66	30.81	26.32	35.15
5 wickets in innings	0	0	1	2
10 wickets in match	0	0	0	0
Best bowling	3/69	3/35	5/29	6/51
Catches/stumpings	0/–	6/–	18/–	24/–
- Source: Cricinfo, 27 June 2026

Benjamin George Lister (born 1 January 1996) is a New Zealand cricketer. He made his first-class debut for Auckland in the 2017–18 Plunket Shield season on 7 November 2017. The following week, he took his maiden five-wicket haul in first-class cricket, with figures of five wickets for 29 runs against Northern Districts.

He made his List A debut for Auckland in the 2017–18 Ford Trophy on 3 December 2017. He made his Twenty20 debut for Auckland in the 2017–18 Super Smash on 13 December 2017. In June 2018, he was awarded a contract with Auckland for the 2018–19 season. In September 2018, he was named in the Auckland Aces' squad for the 2018 Abu Dhabi T20 Trophy. On 17 November 2019, in the 2019–20 Ford Trophy, Lister took his first five-wicket haul in List A cricket. He finished as the leading wicket-taker in the tournament, with 23 dismissals in eleven matches.

In June 2020, he was offered a contract by Auckland ahead of the 2020–21 domestic cricket season. In October 2020, in the opening round of the 2020–21 Plunket Shield season, Lister became the first COVID-19 replacement in a cricket match. Lister replaced Mark Chapman, who reported feeling unwell, inline with the updated International Cricket Council (ICC) playing conditions for a substitute due to COVID.

Lister signed to play in the English T20 Blast for Nottinghamshire in 2024.

== International career ==
In January 2023, Lister earned his maiden call-up to the New Zealand cricket team for their Twenty20 International series against India. He made his international debut on 1 February 2023 during the series.

In March 2023, he was named in New Zealand's One Day International (ODI) squad for their series against Sri Lanka, and in April was named in the squad for the series against Pakistan. He made his ODI debut in the fourth ODI of the series, on 5 May 2023.
