= 2022–23 Ford Trophy =

Cricket tournament

- Dates: 22 November 2022 – 28 March 2023 (Note: Final was originally scheduled for 19 February but was postponed because of the devastation caused in the Hawke’s Bay region by Cyclone Gabrielle.)
- Administrator(s): New Zealand Cricket
- Cricket format: List A cricket
- Tournament format(s): Round-robin and Knockout
- Champions: Central Districts (7th title)
- Participants: 6
- Matches: 32
- Most runs: Hamish Rutherford (408)
- Most wickets: Brett Randell (18); Michael Rae (18)
- Official website: www.blackcaps.co.nz

The 2022–23 Ford Trophy was the 52nd season of The Ford Trophy, the List A cricket tournament that is played in New Zealand. It is the twelfth in a sponsorship deal between New Zealand Cricket and Ford Motor Company. The tournament was held from November 2022 to February 2023. In August 2022, New Zealand Cricket announced schedule of 2022–23 domestic season. Auckland were the defending champions.

On 17 March 2023, New Zealand Cricket (NZC) announced date and venue for the rescheduled grand final match between Central Districts and Canterbury. In the final, Central Districts beat Canterbury by six wickets to win their 7th title.

== Points table ==
Pos	Team	Pld	W	L	T	NR	Pts	NRR
1	Central Districts	10	6	3	0	1	30	0.805
2	Canterbury	10	4	4	0	2	23	0.393
3	Otago	10	4	4	0	2	23	−0.631
4	Northern Districts	10	4	4	0	2	22	0.132
5	Auckland	10	3	4	0	3	19	−0.427
6	Wellington	10	3	5	0	2	18	−0.401

Source: ESPN Cricinfo

Advances to Grand Final
Advance to Elimination Final

== Fixtures ==
22 November 2022
Scorecard

Canterbury; 267/8 (50 overs)	v	Wellington; 165 (28.1 overs)
Leo Carter 67* (76); Michael Snedden 3/62 (10 overs)		Tom Blundell 58 (35); Henry Shipley 6/40 (8 overs)

Canterbury won by 102 runs
Basin Reserve, Wellington
Umpires: Cory Black and Tim Parlane

- Wellington won the toss and elected to field.
- Matthew Boyle (Canterbury) and Tim Robinson (Wellington) both made their List A debuts.

10 December 2022
Scorecard

Auckland; 212/5 (41.2 overs)	v	Northern Districts; 76/1 (14.4 overs)
Robert O'Donnell 72 (100); Henry Cooper 1/15 (4 overs)		Tim Seifert 36* (47); Danru Ferns 1/11 (3 overs)

No Result
Seddon Park, Hamilton
Umpires: Derek Walker and Kannan Jagannathan

- Auckland won the toss and elected to bat.
- Target was revised to 168 off 25 overs due to rain.
- Peter Drysdale (Northern Districts) made his List A debut.

24 November 2022
Scorecard

Otago; 157 (41.4 overs)	v	Central Districts; 159/1 (22.1 overs)
Max Chu 45 (45); Brett Randell 3/33 (9.4 overs)		Dane Cleaver 99* (71); Mathew Bacon 1/30 (4 overs)

Central Districts won by 9 wickets
University of Otago Oval, Dunedin
Umpires: Derek Walker and John Demsey

- Central Districts won the toss and elected to field.

1 December 2022
Scorecard

Auckland; 187 (45.2 overs)	v	Otago; 190/4 (35.1 overs)
Martin Guptill 24 (32); Ben Horne 24 (37); Jacob Duffy 3/30 (10 overs)		Llew Johnson 81 (80); Adithya Ashok 2/46 (9.1 overs)

Otago won by 6 wickets
Cobham Oval, Whangārei
Umpires: Damian Morrow and Derek Walker

- Otago won the toss and elected to field.

30 November 2022
Scorecard

Canterbury; 176 (42.4 overs)	v	Northern Districts; 122/2 (17.5 overs)
Chad Bowes 81 (107); Scott Kuggeleijn 4/36 (8.4 overs)		Katene Clarke 46 (36); Ish Sodhi 1/27 (4.5 overs)

Northern Districts won by 8 wickets (DLS method)
Seddon Park, Hamilton
Umpires: Billy Bowden and Damian Morrow

- Canterbury won the toss and elected to bat.
- Target was revised to 122 off 27 overs due to rain.
- Kris Clarke (Northern Districts) mede his List A debut.

30 November 2022
Scorecard

Wellington; 170 (40.1 overs)	v	Central Districts; 120 (25.2 overs)
Nick Kelly 84 (114); Seth Rance 4/27 (9 overs)		Doug Bracewell 59 (57); Ollie Newton 6/33 (10 overs)

Wellington won by 50 runs
Fitzherbert Park, Palmerston North
Umpires: Pete Pasco and Tim Parlane

- Central Districts won the toss and elected to field.

4 December 2022
Scorecard

Wellington; 270 (50 overs)	v	Northern Districts; 220 (43.1 overs)
Rachin Ravindra 105 (99); Kris Clarke 4/50 (8 overs)		Brett Hampton 55 (53); Ben Sears 4/41 (9.1 overs)

Wellington won by 50 runs
Seddon Park, Hamilton
Umpires: Damian Morrow and Wayne Knights

- Wellington won the toss and elected to bat.

4 December 2022
Scorecard

Central Districts; 256 (44.3 overs)	v	Otago; 133 (25.4 overs)
Will Young 128 (113); Jacob Duffy 5/33 (9.3 overs)		Glenn Phillips 34 (23); Seth Rance 3/29 (7 overs)

Central Districts won by 123 runs
Pukekura Park, New Plymouth
Umpires: Billy Bowden and Derek Walker

- Otago won the toss and elected to field.

4 December 2022
Scorecard

Auckland; 162 (44.1 overs)	v	Canterbury; 166/2 (20 overs)
Danru Ferns 42* (52); Henry Shipley 3/14 (8 overs)		Chad Bowes 85* (58); William Somerville 1/12 (3 overs)

Canterbury won by 8 wickets
Mainpower Oval, Rangiora
Umpires: Kannan Jagannathan and Tim Parlane

- Canterbury won the toss and elected to field.

8 December 2022
Scorecard

Auckland; 186 (42.5 overs)	v	Northern Districts; 187/8 (40.5 overs)
Ryan Harrison 45 (61); Neil Wagner 5/31 (8.5 overs)		Joe Carter 57 (63); Danru Ferns 2/25 (6 overs)

Northern Districts won by 2 wickets
Seddon Park, Hamilton
Umpires: Damian Morrow and Derek Walker

- Auckland won the toss and elected to bat.

8 December 2022
Scorecard

Wellington; 79 (27.5 overs)	v	Canterbury; 83/5 (18.2 overs)
Rachin Ravindra 14 (28); William O'Rourke 3/15 (7 overs)		Cole McConchie 27 (37); Logan van Beek 3/24 (8 overs)

Canterbury won by 5 wickets
Hagley Oval, Christchurch
Umpires: Pete Pasco and Tim Parlane

- Canterbury won the toss and elected to field.

13 December 2022
Scorecard

Auckland; 165 (45 overs)	v	Central Districts; 169/2 (33.4 overs)
Robert O'Donnell 51 (90); Ajaz Patel 3/31 (9 overs)		Brad Schmulian 54 (63); Adithya Ashok 2/55 (7.4 overs)

Central Districts won by 8 wickets
Colin Maiden Park, Auckland
Umpires: Billy Bowden and Greg Pennell

- Central Districts won the toss and elected to field.

14 December 2022
Scorecard

Northern Districts; 381/5 (50 overs)	v	Wellington; 348 (48.1 overs)
Tim Seifert 103 (87); Michael Snedden 2/63 (7 overs)		Finn Allen 90 (54); Scott Johnston 2/29 (7 overs)

Northern Districts won by 33 runs
Basin Reserve, Wellington
Umpires: Shaun Haig and Vinit Mahna

- Wellington won the toss and elected to field.
- Scott Johnston (Northern Districts) made his List A debut.

14 December 2022
Scorecard

Canterbury; 160 (37.3 overs)	v	Otago; 163/5 (35.2 overs)
Tom Latham 35 (38); Michael Rippon 4/32 (8.3 overs)		Hamish Rutherford 76* (102); Matt Henry 2/33 (10 overs)

Otago won by 5 wickets
Hagley Oval, Christchurch
Umpires: Tim Parlane and Pete Pasco

- Otago won the toss and elected to field.

15 December 2022
Scorecard

Central Districts; 147 (37 overs)	v	Auckland; 150/7 (43.3 overs)
Brad Schmulian 46 (82); Ben Lister 4/40 (10 overs)		Robert O'Donnell 54* (90); Brett Randell 3/25 (8 overs)

Auckland won by 3 wickets
Pukekura Park, New Plymouth
Umpires: Matt Gibson and Derek Walker

- Auckland won the toss and elected to field.
- Matt Gibson (Auckland) made his List A debut.

18 December 2022
Scorecard

Central Districts; 268/6 (47 overs)	v	Wellington; 140/7 (23 overs)
Tom Bruce 80 (66); Michael Snedden 2/52 (9 overs)		Luke Georgeson 54 (62); Tom Bruce 3/4 (1 over)

Central Districts won by 18 runs (DLS method)
McLean Park, Napier
Umpires: Tim Parlane and Vinit Mahna

- Wellington won the toss and elected to field.
- Callum McLachlan (Wellington) and Will Clark (Central Districts) both made their List A debuts.

18 December 2022
Scorecard

Canterbury	v	Northern Districts

Match Abandoned
Hagley Oval, Christchurch
Umpires: Billy Bowden and Tyron Davies

- No toss.
- No play was possible due to rain.

18 December 2022
Scorecard

Auckland; 12/0 (4.1 overs)	v	Otago
Sean Solia 10* (15)

No Result
John Davies Oval, Queenstown
Umpires: Derek Walker and Eugene Sanders

- Otago won the toss and elected to field.
- No further play was possible due to rain.

10 January 2023
Scorecard

Wellington; 392/6 (50 overs)	v	Otago; 282 (42.5 overs)
Rachin Ravindra 113 (102); Dean Foxcroft 2/42 (10 overs)		Hamish Rutherford 63 (51); Luke Georgeson 4/42 (7.5 overs)

Wellington won by 110 runs
University of Otago Oval, Dunedin
Umpires: Shaun Haig and Kannan Jagannathan

- Otago won the toss and elected to field.
- Devan Vishvaka (Wellington) made his List A debut.

11 January 2023
Scorecard

Central Districts; 250/8 (50 overs)	v	Canterbury; 251/4 (49 overs)
Brad Schmulian 87 (106); Zak Foulkes 3/38 (9 overs)		Ken McClure 100* (127); Brett Randell 2/29 (10 overs)

Canterbury won by 6 wickets
Hagley Oval, Christchurch
Umpires: Derek Walker and Pete Pasco

- Canterbury won the toss and elected to field.

17 January 2023
Scorecard

Northern Districts; 274/9 (50 overs)	v	Central Districts; 275/4 (39.4 overs)
Henry Cooper 102* (116); Brett Randell 5/39 (10 overs)		Ben Smith 145 (119); Joe Walker 2/45 (8.4 overs)

Central Districts won by 6 wickets
Seddon Park, Hamilton
Umpires: Glen Walklin and Pete Pasco

- Central Districts won the toss and elected to field.
- Angus Schaw (Central Districts) made his List A debut.

18 January 2023
Scorecard

Canterbury; 169 (46 overs)	v	Otago; 171/7 (43.5 overs)
Leo Carter 51 (75); Michael Rae 3/35 (9 overs)		Michael Rippon 44* (73); Blake Coburn 2/25 (9.5 overs)

Otago won by 3 wickets
University of Otago Oval, Dunedin
Umpires: Derek Walker and N Louw

- Otago won the toss and elected to field.

25 January 2023
Scorecard

Wellington; 219 (49.4 overs)	v	Auckland; 222/3 (43.1 overs)
Luke Georgeson 52 (83); Louis Delport 4/29 (10 overs)		George Worker 91* (97); Logan van Beek 3/46 (10 overs)

Auckland won by 7 wickets
Basin Reserve, Wellington
Umpires: Tim Parlane and Tyron Davies

- Auckland won the toss and elected to field.

25 January 2023
Scorecard

Otago; 222/9 (50 overs)	v	Northern Districts; 223/3 (30.5 overs)
Hamish Rutherford 57 (88); Kris Clarke 3/48 (7 overs)		Tim Seifert 80 (79); Josh Finnie 2/32 (4 overs)

Northern Districts won by 7 wickets
Seddon Park, Hamilton
Umpires: Chris Brown and Greg Pennell

- Northern Districts won the toss and elected to field.
- Nick Kwant (Otago) made his List A debut.

2 February 2023
Scorecard

Canterbury; 131 (38.3 overs)	v	Auckland; 132/3 (22.2 overs)
Chad Bowes 37 (30); Louis Delport 4/16 (10 overs)		Cole Briggs 52 (57); Angus McKenzie 1/14 (2.2 overs)

Auckland won by 7 wickets
Hagley Oval, Christchurch
Umpires: Derek Walker and Glen Walklin

- Auckland won the toss and elected to field.

1 February 2023
Scorecard

Wellington; 219/9 (50 overs)	v	Otago
Luke Georgeson 48 (73); Mathew Bacon 3/35 (10 overs)

No Result
Basin Reserve, Wellington
Umpires: Pete Pasco and Tim Parlane

- Otago won the toss and elected to field.
- No further play was possible due to rain.
- HWR Kindley and Thorn Parkes (Otago) both made their List A debuts.

6 February 2023
Scorecard

Northern Districts; 205 (48.3 overs)	v	Central Districts; 209/7 (47.2 overs)
Kane Williamson 43 (68); Josh Clarkson 3/25 (10 overs)		Will Young 71 (72); Tim Pringle 3/21 (10 overs)

Central Districts won by 3 wickets
McLean Park, Napier
Umpires: Billy Bowden and Pete Pasco

- Central Districts won the toss and elected to field.

14 February 2023
Scorecard

Auckland	v	Wellington

Match Abandoned
Colin Maiden Park, Auckland

- No toss.
- No play was possible due to rain.

14 February 2023
Scorecard

Central Districts	v	Canterbury

Match Abandoned
McLean Park, Napier
Umpires: Glen Walklin and Kannan Jagannathan

- No toss.
- No play was possible due to rain.

14 February 2023
Scorecard

Northern Districts; 240 (49.3 overs)	v	Otago; 241/3 (37.4 overs)
Brett Hampton 74 (67); Michael Rae 4/50 (10 overs)		Hamish Rutherford 120* (104); Kris Clarke 2/34 (7 overs)

Otago won by 7 wickets
University of Otago Oval, Dunedin
Umpires: Derek Walker and Tim Parlane

- Otago won the toss and elected to field.

== Finals ==
Elimination Final			Grand Final
			1	Central Districts	216/4 (43.3 overs)
2	Canterbury	350/8 (50 overs)	2	Canterbury	212/9 (50 overs)
3	Otago	221 (39 overs)

=== Elimination Final ===
17 February 2023
Scorecard

Canterbury; 350/8 (50 overs)	v	Otago; 221 (39 overs)
Chad Bowes 126 (108); Michael Rae 5/57 (10 overs)		Jake Gibson 59 (39); Cole McConchie 3/43 (9 overs)

Canterbury won by 129 runs
John Davies Oval, Queenstown
Umpires: Cory Black and John Dempsey

- Otago won the toss and elected to field.

=== Grand Final ===
28 March 2023
Scorecard

Canterbury; 212/9 (50 overs)	v	Central Districts; 216/4 (43.3 overs)
Cole McConchie 54 (90); Jayden Lennox 3/27 (10 overs)		Josh Clarkson 111* (78); Sean Davey 2/23 (8 overs)

Central Districts won by 6 wickets
McLean Park, Napier
Umpires: John Dempsey and Derek Walker

- Canterbury won the toss and elected to bat.
- Rhys Mariu (Canterbury) made his List A debut.
