= 2022–23 Super Smash (men's cricket) =

Cricket tournament

2022–23 Men's Super Smash
- Dates: 23 December 2022 – 11 February 2023
- Administrator: New Zealand Cricket
- Cricket format: Twenty20
- Tournament format(s): Round robin and knockout finals
- Champions: Northern Brave (4th title)
- Participants: 6
- Matches: 32
- Most runs: Dean Foxcroft (424)
- Most wickets: Jayden Lennox (16); Michael Rae (16)
- Official website: Super Smash

The 2022–23 Dream11 Super Smash was the eighteenth season of the men's Super Smash Twenty20 cricket competition played in New Zealand. It took place between 23 December 2022 and 11 February 2023, with 6 provincial teams taking part. Northern Brave were the defending champions.

The tournament ran running alongside the 2022–23 Plunket Shield and 2022–23 Ford Trophy.

Northern Brave won the tournament after beating Canterbury Kings in the final, winning their fourth title.

== Competition format ==
Teams played in a double round-robin in a group of six, therefore playing 10 matches overall. Matches were played using a Twenty20 format. The top team in the group advanced straight to the final, whilst the second and third placed teams played off in an elimination final.

The group worked on a points system with positions being based on the total points. Points were awarded as follows:

Win: 4 points
Tie: 2 points
Loss: 0 points
Abandoned/No Result: 2 points

== Points table ==
Pos	Team	Pld	W	L	T	NR	Pts	NRR
1	Canterbury Kings	10	6	4	0	0	24	0.431
2	Otago Volts	10	5	3	1	1	24	−0.059
3	Northern Brave	10	4	3	0	3	22	0.381
4	Central Stags	10	4	5	0	1	18	−0.299
5	Wellington Firebirds	10	3	5	0	2	16	0.205
6	Auckland Aces	10	3	5	1	1	16	−0.658

Source: Dream11 Super Smash

Advances to Grand Final
Advance to Elimination Final

== Fixtures ==
=== Round-robin ===
23 December 2022
Scorecard

Northern Brave; 96/5 (14 overs)	v	Canterbury Kings; 98/1 (12.5 overs)
Joe Carter 27 (26); Henry Shipley 2/5 (2 overs)		Chad Bowes 57 (39); Tim Pringle 1/13 (3 overs)

Canterbury Kings won by 9 wickets
Bay Oval, Mount Maunganui
Umpires: Cory Black and Damian Morrow

- Canterbury Kings won the toss and elected to bat.
- Match reduced to 14 overs per side due to rain.
- Matthew Boyle (Kings) and Kris Clarke (Brave) made their T20 debuts.

24 December 2022
Scorecard

Wellington Firebirds; 152/8 (20 overs)	v	Otago Volts; 144/7 (20 overs)
Rachin Ravindra 67 (45); Michael Rae 3/13 (2 overs)		Dean Foxcroft 73 (57); Adam Milne 2/24 (4 overs)

Wellington Firebirds won by 8 runs
Basin Reserve, Wellington
Umpires: Billy Bowden and Tyron Davies

- Otago Volts won the toss and elected to field.
- Callum McLachlan (Firebirds) made his T20 debut.

26 December 2022
Scorecard

Canterbury Kings; 147/9 (20 overs)	v	Auckland Aces; 149/6 (19.3 overs)
Chad Bowes 51 (29); Ben Lister 3/31 (4 overs)		Ben Horne 54* (24); Henry Shipley 3/24 (3.3 overs)

Auckland Aces won by 4 wickets
Hagley Oval, Christchurch
Umpires: Kim Cotton and Kannan Jagannathan

- Auckland Aces won the toss and elected to field.

27 December 2022
Scorecard

Wellington Firebirds; 214/6 (20 overs)	v	Central Stags; 212/7 (20 overs)
Nick Kelly 58 (25); Tom Bruce 2/27 (4 overs)		Tom Bruce 56 (23); Rachin Ravindra 3/42 (4 overs)

Wellington Firebirds won by 2 runs
Fitzherbert Park, Palmerston North
Umpires: Derek Walker and John Dempsey

- Central Stags won the toss and elected to field.
- Brett Johnson (Stags) and Raymond Toole (Stags) made their T20 debuts.

28 December 2022
Scorecard

Otago Volts; 123/8 (20 overs)	v	Northern Brave; 126/3 (15.1 overs)
Michael Rippon 40 (44); Mitchell Santner 2/19 (4 overs)		Mitchell Santner 41 (20); Ben Lockrose 1/29 (4 overs)

Northern Brave won by 7 wickets
Queenstown Events Centre, Queenstown
Umpires: Eloise Sheridan and Shaun Haig

- Northern Brave won the toss and elected to field.
- Thorn Parkes (Volts) made his T20 debut.

29 December 2022
Scorecard

Otago Volts; 165/8 (20 overs)	v	Auckland Aces; 128 (19.5 overs)
Dean Foxcroft 44 (34); Lockie Ferguson 2/26 (4 overs)		George Worker 27 (18); Dean Foxcroft 5/11 (4 overs)

Otago Volts won by 37 runs
Queenstown Events Centre, Queenstown
Umpires: Eloise Sheridan and Kim Cotton

- Auckland won the toss and elected to field.
- Dean Foxcroft (Volts) took his first five-wicket haul in T20 cricket.

30 December 2022
Scorecard

Central Stags; 186/3 (20 overs)	v	Canterbury Kings; 187/6 (19.1 overs)
Leo Carter 88* (63); Brett Randell 1/30 (4 overs)		Josh Clarkson 46* (20); Henry Shipley 2/30 (3 overs)

Central Stags won by 4 wickets
Pukekura Park, New Plymouth
Umpires: Cory Black and Wayne Knights

- Canterbury Kings won the toss and elected to bat.

31 December 2022
Scorecard

Northern Brave; 217/9 (20 overs)	v	Central Stags; 219/7 (19.4 overs)
Jeet Raval 60 (29); Tom Bruce 3/35 (3 overs)		Josh Clarkson 58 (29); Brett Hampton 2/33 (2.4 overs)

Central Stags won by 3 wickets
Pukekura Park, New Plymouth
Umpires: Cory Black and John Dempsey

- Central Stags won the toss and elected to field.

1 January 2023
Scorecard

Canterbury Kings; 132/8 (20 overs)	v	Wellington Firebirds; 133/2 (11.5 overs)
Cole McConchie 35 (36); Nathan Smith 2/16 (3 overs)		Finn Allen 78 (37); Ed Nuttall 1/13 (1 over)

Wellington Firebirds won by 8 wickets
Hagley Oval, Christchurch
Umpires: Billy Bowden and Eloise Sheridan

- Canterbury Kings won the toss and elected to bat.

2 January 2023
Scorecard

Otago Volts; 174/8 (20 overs)	v	Auckland Aces; 174/8 (20 overs)
Dean Foxcroft 69 (56); Sean Solia 2/28 (4 overs)		Sean Solia 39 (29); Jacob Duffy 2/27 (4 overs)

Match tied
Eden Park Outer Oval, Auckland
Umpires: Glen Walklin and Wayne Knights

- Auckland Aces won the toss and elected to field.

4 January 2023
Scorecard

Wellington Firebirds; 136/8 (20 overs)	v	Northern Brave; 139/4 (18.4 overs)
Nathan Smith 35 (30); Tim Pringle 3/23 (4 overs)		Henry Cooper 52* (45); Nick Kelly 2/11 (2 overs)

Northern Brave won by 6 wickets
Basin Reserve, Wellington
Umpires: John Dempsey and Tim Parlane

- Northern Brave won the toss and elected to field.
- Devan Vishvaka (Firebirds) made his T20 debut.

5 January 2023
Scorecard

Auckland Aces; 150/9 (20 overs)	v	Central Stags; 151/6 (19.3 overs)
Cole Briggs 45 (25); Raymond Toole 3/23 (4 overs)		Ross Taylor 50 (40); Louis Delport 2/23 (4 overs)

Central Stags won by 4 wickets
Pukekura Park, New Plymouth
Umpires: Billy Bowden and Kim Cotton

- Central Stags won the toss and elected to field.

6 January 2023
Scorecard

Northern Brave	v	Otago Volts

Match abandoned
Seddon Park, Hamilton
Umpires: Chris Brown and Tim Parlane

- Otago Volts won the toss and elected to field.
- No play was possible due to rain.
- Jarrod McKay (Volts) made his T20 debut.

7 January 2023
Scorecard

Wellington Firebirds	v	Central Stags

Match Abandoned
Basin Reserve, Wellington
Umpires: Derek Walker and Kannan Jagannathan

- No toss.
- No play was possible due to rain.

8 January 2023
Scorecard

Auckland Aces; 140/5 (20 overs)	v	Canterbury Kings; 48/1 (5.3 overs)
Robert O'Donnell 51 (46); William O’Rourke 2/31 (4 overs)		Ken McClure 32 (14)

Canterbury Kings won by 14 runs (DLS method)
Eden Park Outer Oval, Auckland
Umpires: Billy Bowden and Pete Pasco

- Canterbury Kings won the toss and elected to field.
- Rain prevented any further play.
- Canterbury Kings were 14 runs ahead of the DLS par score of 34 runs from 5.3 overs.
- Zak Foulkes (Kings) made his T20 debut.

13 January 2023
Scorecard

Canterbury Kings; 154/9 (20 overs)	v	Northern Brave; 106 (18.1 overs)
Mitchell Hay 32 (24); Brett Hampton 3/1 (2 overs)		Scott Kuggeleijn 25 (20); Zak Foulkes 4/23 (4 overs)

Canterbury Kings won by 48 runs
Hagley Oval, Christchurch
Umpires: Kim Cotton and John Dempsey

- Northern Brave won the toss and elected to field.

14 January 2023
Scorecard

Auckland Aces; 191/8 (20 overs)	v	Central Stags; 108/2 (9.2 overs)
Cole Briggs 50 (33); Jayden Lennox 3/31 (4 overs)		Will Young 67 (27); Ben Lister 1/23 (2 overs)

Central Stags won by 29 runs (DLS method)
Eden Park Outer Oval, Auckland
Umpires: Chris Brown and Glen Walklin

- Central Stags won the toss and elected to field.
- Rain prevented any further play.
- Central Stags were 29 runs ahead of the DLS par score of 80 runs from 9.2 overs.
- Will Clark and Angus Schaw (Central Stags) both made their T20 debuts.

15 January 2023
Scorecard

Wellington Firebirds; 120/7 (20 overs)	v	Otago Volts; 123/5 (19.2 overs)
Troy Johnson 57* (48); Michael Rae 3/18 (4 overs)		Dean Foxcroft 26 (25); Nathan Smith 2/19 (3.2 overs)

Otago Volts won by 5 wickets
University of Otago Oval, Dunedin
Umpires: Cory Black and Shaun Haig

- Wellington Firebirds won the toss and elected to bat.

20 January 2023
Scorecard

Wellington Firebirds; 153/6 (20 overs)	v	Auckland Aces; 156/8 (19.3 overs)
Logan van Beek 54 (36); Ben Lister 2/15 (4 overs)		Robert O'Donnell 59 (27); Nathan Smith 3/13 (4 overs)

Auckland Aces won by 2 wickets
Eden Park Outer Oval, Auckland
Umpires: Chris Brown and Glen Walklin

- Auckland Aces won the toss and elected to field.

21 January 2023
Scorecard

Otago Volts; 166/8 (20 overs)	v	Central Stags; 162/9 (20 overs)
Dean Foxcroft 66 (49); Brett Randell 2/30 (4 overs)		Bayley Wiggins 41 (24); Matt Bacon 5/28 (4 overs)

Otago Volts won by 4 runs
Saxton Oval, Nelson
Umpires: Kim Cotton and Tim Parlane

- Central Stags won the toss and elected to field.

22 January 2023
Scorecard

Northern Brave; 172/5 (20 overs)	v	Auckland Aces; 135 (20 overs)
Joe Carter 76 (41); Adithya Ashok 2/36 (4 overs)		Kyle Jamieson 45 (36); Neil Wagner 3/26 (4 overs)

Northern Brave won by 37 runs
Bay Oval, Mount Maunganui
Umpires: Billy Bowden and Chris Brown

- Auckland Aces won the toss and elected to field.

23 January 2023
Scorecard

Wellington Firebirds; 148 (19.2 overs)	v	Canterbury Kings; 152/5 (19.5 overs)
Tom Blundell 70 (49); Will O'Rourke 3/29 (3.2 overs)		Cam Fletcher 55* (38); Michael Snedden 2/22 (4 overs)

Canterbury Kings won by 5 wickets
Basin Reserve, Wellington
Umpires: Cory Black and Derek Walker

- Canterbury Kings won the toss and elected to field.

27 January 2023
Scorecard

Canterbury Kings; 189/3 (20 overs)	v	Central Stags; 131/9 (20 overs)
Chad Bowes 89 (52); Bevan Small 1/19 (3 overs)		Will Clark 44* (36); Zak Foulkes 3/22 (4 overs)

Canterbury Kings won by 58 runs
Hagley Oval, Christchurch
Umpires: Kim Cotton and Derek Walker

- Central Stags won the toss and elected to field.

28 January 2023
Scorecard

Northern Brave	v	Wellington Firebirds

Match Abandoned
Seddon Park, Hamilton
Umpires: John Dempsey and Damian Morrow

- No toss.
- No play was possible due to rain.

29 January 2023
Scorecard

Central Stags; 187/5 (20 overs)	v	Otago Volts; 190/6 (19.3 overs)
Tom Bruce 79* (45); Travis Muller 3/33 (4 overs)		Ben Lockrose 58* (26); Jayden Lennox 4/28 (4 overs)

Otago Volts won by 4 wickets
University of Otago Oval, Dunedin
Umpires: Cory Black and Tim Parlane

- Otago Volts won the toss and elected to field.

30 January 2023
Scorecard

Auckland Aces	v	Northern Brave

Match Abandoned
Eden Park Outer Oval, Auckland

- No toss.
- No play was possible due to rain.

3 February 2023
Scorecard

Central Stags; 110/7 (20 overs)	v	Northern Brave; 114/6 (17.3 overs)
Josh Clarkson 45 (35); Scott Kuggeleijn 3/14 (4 overs)		Jeet Raval 49 (35); Doug Bracewell 3/19 (4 overs)

Northern Brave won by 4 wickets
Seddon Park, Hamilton
Umpires: Billy Bowden and Derek Walker

- Northern Brave won the toss and elected to field.

4 February 2023
Scorecard

Canterbury Kings; 156/8 (20 overs)	v	Otago Volts; 161/6 (19.3 overs)
Mitchell Hay 46 (32); Matthew Bacon 2/17 (4 overs)		Jake Gibson 96 (63); Angus McKenzie 4/15 (3.3 overs)

Otago Volts won by 4 wickets
Hagley Oval, Christchurch
Umpires: Eugene Sanders and Tim Parlane

- Otago Volts won the toss and elected to field.

5 February 2023
Scorecard

Auckland Aces; 119/8 (18 overs)	v	Wellington Firebirds; 110 (17.4 overs)
Robert O'Donnell 43 (38); Logan van Beek 4/15 (4 overs)		Nick Kelly 24 (29); Louis Delport 3/21 (4 overs)

Auckland Aces won by 9 runs (DLS method)
Basin Reserve, Wellington
Umpires: Eugene Sanders and John Dempsey

- Wellington Firebirds won the toss and elected to field.
- Match was reduced to 18 overs per side due to rain.

6 February 2023
Scorecard

Otago Volts; 166/8 (20 overs)	v	Canterbury Kings; 167/2 (16.5 overs)
Jake Gibson 75* (48); Todd Astle 3/24 (4 overs)		Ken McClure 68 (42); Mathew Bacon 1/29 (3 overs)

Canterbury Kings won by 8 wickets
University of Otago Oval, Dunedin
Umpires: Derek Walker and Shaun Haig

- Canterbury Kings won the toss and elected to field.

== Finals ==
=== Elimination Final ===
9 February 2023
Scorecard

Northern Brave; 199/4 (18 overs)	v	Otago Volts; 160/9 (15 overs)
Katene Clarke 73 (39); Mathew Bacon 2/43 (4 overs)		Josh Finnie 43 (22); Neil Wagner 3/30 (3 overs)

Northern Brave won by 16 runs (DLS method)
University of Otago Oval, Dunedin
Umpires: Billy Bowden and Wayne Knights

- Otago Volts won the toss and elected to field.
- Otago Volts were set a revised target of 177 runs off 15 overs due to rain.

=== Grand Final ===
11 February 2023
Scorecard

Canterbury Kings; 154/6 (20 overs)	v	Northern Brave; 156/3 (18 overs)
Cole McConchie 54 (36); Mitchell Santner 3/16 (4 overs)		Tim Seifert 51 (40); Henry Shipley 2/42 (4 overs)

Northern Brave won by 7 wickets
Hagley Oval, Christchurch
Umpires: Chris Brown and Shaun Haig

- Canterbury Kings won the toss and elected to bat.
