= 2021–22 Plunket Shield season =

Cricket tournament

2021–22 Plunket Shield
- Dates: 23 October 2021 – 15 April 2022
- Cricket format: First-class
- Tournament format: Round-robin
- Champions: Auckland (24th title)
- Participants: 6
- Matches: 24
- Most runs: Tom Bruce (858)
- Most wickets: Brett Randell (31); Nathan Smith (31)

The 2021–22 Plunket Shield was the 96th season of the Plunket Shield, the domestic first-class cricket competition that was played in New Zealand. The tournament took place from October 2021 to April 2022. In July 2021, New Zealand Cricket named all the squads for the domestic teams ahead of the 2021–22 season.

In September 2021, New Zealand Cricket announced the schedule for the tournament. However, due to the impact of the COVID-19 pandemic in New Zealand, two of the opening round fixtures were postponed, and were rescheduled for a later date. Auckland won the tournament during the penultimate round of matches, after the match between Northern Districts and Central Districts ended in a draw due to positive COVID-19 cases in the Northern Districts' team. As a result of the COVID-19 cases, Northern Districts had 19 players unavailable for their final match of the season, with seven players making their first-class debut. It was the highest number of debutants in the same match for Northern Districts since their inaugural first-class fixture in 1956.

== Points table ==
Team	Pld	W	L	D	Ab	Pts	Avge
Auckland	8	5	1	1	1	104	13.00
Canterbury	8	4	1	3	0	92	11.50
Northern Districts	7	3	3	0	1	68	9.71
Central Districts	7	1	2	4	0	56	8.00
Otago	8	2	4	2	0	61	7.62
Wellington	8	2	6	0	0	58	7.25

Champions.

Teams were ranked by average points per completed match, including abandoned matches, which earned four points, but the regulations excluded the Covid-affected draw between Northern Districts and Central Districts from the calculations.

== Fixtures ==
=== 2021 ===
23–26 October 2021
Scorecard

Otago	v	Wellington
207 (62.1 overs); Travis Muller 30 (63); Michael Snedden 3/48 (16 overs)		195 (67.2 overs); Troy Johnson 78 (166); Travis Muller 6/52 (17.2 overs)
180 (62.4 overs); Hamish Rutherford 77 (143); Nathan Smith 6/54 (24.4 overs)		193/4 (73 overs); Luke Georgeson 74 (196); Travis Muller 1/43 (17 overs)

Wellington won by 6 wickets
Basin Reserve, Wellington
Umpires: Tim Parlane and Shaun Haig

- Wellington won the toss and elected to field.
- Jake Gibson (Otago) made his first-class debut.

23–26 October 2021
Scorecard

Central Districts	v	Canterbury
369 (99.2 overs); Bayley Wiggins 133 (138); Matt Henry 4/82 (27 overs)		241 (77.2 overs); Cam Fletcher 50 (100); Blair Tickner 5/64 (17.2 overs)
321/6d (83 overs); Greg Hay 101 (228); Matt Henry 1/20 (9 overs)		249/5 (96 overs); Tom Latham 104 (227); Jayden Lennox 2/36 (22 overs)

Match drawn
Hagley Oval, Christchurch
Umpires: Derek Walker and John Bromley

- Central Districts won the toss and elected to bat.
- Bayley Wiggins (Central Districts) made his first-class debut.
- Bayley Wiggins (Central Districts) scored his maiden century in first-class cricket.

31 October – 3 November 2021
Scorecard

Canterbury	v	Wellington
379/9d (122.3 overs); Cam Fletcher 110 (258); Nathan Smith 5/51 (23 overs)		161 (79.2 overs); Rachin Ravindra 26 (60); Fraser Sheat 5/30 (20 overs)
230/1d (54 overs); Tom Latham 127* (184); Rachin Ravindra 1/78 (15 overs)		154 (84.2 overs); Rachin Ravindra 70 (247); Matt Henry 4/43 (21.2 overs)

Canterbury won by 294 runs
Basin Reserve, Wellington
Umpires: Derek Walker and Kim Cotton

- Wellington won the toss and elected to field.
- Nick Greenwood (Wellington) made his first-class debut.

31 October – 3 November 2021
Scorecard

Central Districts	v	Otago
394 (118 overs); Greg Hay 152 (331); Jake Gibson 4/84 (21 overs)		642/6d (179 overs); Nick Kelly 234* (245); Ben Wheeler 2/52 (29 overs)
274/2 (73 overs); Brad Schmulian 117 (167); Jake Gibson 1/31 (7 overs)

Match drawn
University Oval, Dunedin
Umpires: John Bromley and Shaun Haig

- Central Districts won the toss and elected to bat.

7–10 November 2021
Scorecard

Otago	v	Central Districts
244 (85.5 overs); Dale Phillips 113 (209); Doug Bracewell 4/53 (19 overs)		265 (90.3 overs); Brad Schmulian 60 (134); Michael Rippon 3/67 (23.3 overs)
422/7d (113.3 overs); Mitch Renwick 134 (268); Jayden Lennox 3/112 (29.3 overs)		240 (77.5 overs); Tom Bruce 77* (150); Michael Rippon 3/85 (24 overs)

Otago won by 161 runs
Saxton Oval, Nelson
Umpires: John Bromley and Tim Parlane

- Central Districts won the toss and elected to field.

7–10 November 2021
Scorecard

Canterbury	v	Wellington
156 (51.2 overs); Chad Bowes 59 (72); Michael Snedden 3/28 (10.2 overs)		134 (57.5 overs); Jakob Bhula 29 (90); Henry Shipley 3/19 (10 overs)
407 (119.5 overs); Ken McClure 130 (193); Michael Bracewell 3/75 (25.5 overs)		115 (49.5 overs); Finn Allen 38 (75); Matt Henry 4/37 (17 overs)

Canterbury won by 314 runs
Basin Reserve, Wellington
Umpires: Cory Black and Derek Walker

- Wellington won the toss and elected to field.
- Callum McLachlan (Wellington) made his first-class debut.

15–18 November 2021
Scorecard

Northern Districts	v	Canterbury
187 (64.3 overs); Joe Carter 74* (136); Henry Shipley 4/26 (12.3 overs)		82 (31 overs); Chad Bowes 25 (46); Brett Randell 4/32 (11 overs)
123 (44.1 overs); Peter Bocock 28 (55); Matt Henry 4/46 (17 overs)		229/8 (67.5 overs); Cam Fletcher 56* (154); Brett Randell 3/41 (16 overs)

Canterbury won by 2 wickets
Bay Oval, Mount Maunganui
Umpires: Cory Black and Derek Walker

- Northern Districts won the toss and elected to bat.

15–18 November 2021
Scorecard

Wellington	v	Central Districts
238 (97.2 overs); Nathan Smith 56 (115); Seth Rance 4/52 (20.2 overs)		358 (95.3 overs); Brad Schmulian 88 (93); Ben Sears 5/88 (20 overs)
250 (87 overs); Nathan Smith 72* (126); Ben Wheeler 4/54 (24 overs)		134/3 (44.1 overs); Dane Cleaver 54* (100); Ben Sears 2/40 (9 overs)

Central Districts won by 7 wickets
Basin Reserve, Wellington
Umpires: John Bromley and Tim Parlane

- Central Districts won the toss and elected to field.
- James Hartshorn (Wellington) and Ma'ara Ave (Central Districts) both made their first-class debuts.

22–25 November 2021
Scorecard

Otago	v	Northern Districts
342 (117.5 overs); Max Chu 103* (246); Brett Randell 5/56 (26 overs)		553 (148.1 overs); Henry Cooper 200 (379); Michael Rippon 5/142 (37.1 overs)
137 (66 overs); Dale Phillips 68* (179); Joe Walker 4/47 (27 overs)

Northern Districts won by an innings and 74 runs
Molyneux Park, Alexandra
Umpires: Derek Walker and Eugene Sanders

- Northern Districts won the toss and elected to field.
- Max Chu (Otago) scored his maiden century in first-class cricket.
- Henry Cooper (Northern Districts) scored his maiden double century in first-class cricket.

=== 2022 ===
4–7 February 2022
Scorecard

Northern Districts	v	Auckland
230 (78.2 overs); Mitchell Santner 59 (97); Ross ter Braak 3/59 (13 overs)		208 (81.4 overs); Sean Solia 72 (160); Tim Southee 5/35 (17 overs)
173 (68.4 overs); Neil Wagner 36 (74); Will Somerville 3/41 (19.4 overs)		196/6 (47.5 overs); Mark Chapman 53* (72); Brett Randell 2/40 (11 overs)

Auckland won by 4 wickets
Eden Park, Auckland
Umpires: Chris Brown and Wayne Knights

- Auckland won the toss and elected to field.

11–14 February 2022
Scorecard

Auckland	v	Otago
325/9d (89 overs); Mark Chapman 97 (160); Michael Rippon 3/65 (16 overs)		86/4d (40.1 overs); Mitch Renwick 38* (125); Simon Keene 2/14 (8 overs)
84/2d (9 overs); Glenn Phillips 53* (24); Travis Muller 1/39 (4 overs)		110 (49.1 overs); Nick Kelly 48 (109); Simon Keene 5/24 (8.1 overs)

Auckland won by 213 runs
University Oval, Dunedin
Umpires: Billy Bowden and Tim Parlane

- Otago won the toss and elected to field.
- No play was possible on day 3 due to rain.
- Jacob Cumming, Thorn Parkes (Otago) and Simon Keene (Auckland) all made their first-class debuts.
- Simon Keene (Auckland) took his maiden five-wicket haul in first-class cricket.

3–6 March 2022
Scorecard

Auckland	v	Canterbury
547/9d (131.5 overs); Robert O'Donnell 223 (354); Jack Boyle 3/21 (4.5 overs)		200 (95 overs); Henry Shipley 61 (168); Sean Solia 3/17 (11 overs)
131/2d (15 overs); Glenn Phillips 57* (31); Zak Foulkes 1/27 (4 overs)		254 (120 overs); Henry Shipley 70 (126); Simon Keene 6/44 (27 overs)

Auckland won by 224 runs
Eden Park, Auckland
Umpires: Chris Brown and John Dempsey

- Auckland won the toss and elected to bat.
- Zak Foulkes (Canterbury) made his first-class debut.

3–6 March 2022
Scorecard

Northern Districts	v	Wellington
243 (87.4 overs); Kris Clarke 63* (94); Rachin Ravindra 3/38 (10 overs)		119 (45.1 overs); Callum McLachlan 40* (70); Brett Randell 3/36 (13 overs)
314/8d (100 overs); Joe Carter 76 (121); Michael Bracewell 3/107 (33 overs)		225 (104.3 overs); Nathan Smith 70 (189); Joe Walker 4/50 (27.3 overs)

Northern Districts won by 213 runs
Cobham Oval, Whangārei
Umpires: Billy Bowden and Cory Black

- Northern Districts won the toss and elected to bat.
- Kris Clarke (Northern Districts) made his first-class debut.

11–14 March 2022
Scorecard

Auckland	v	Otago
389 (116.4 overs); Robert O'Donnell 84 (140); Jarrod McKay 4/85 (25 overs)		334 (117.4 overs); Nick Kelly 75 (128); Will Somerville 4/66 (28.4 overs)
259/4d (44 overs); Glenn Phillips 73 (59); Jacob Duffy 2/38 (13 overs)		156 (81.3 overs); Mitch Renwick 45 (90); Louis Delport 4/59 (30 overs)

Auckland won by 158 runs
Molyneux Park, Alexandra
Umpires: Billy Bowden and John Bromley

- Auckland won the toss and elected to bat.

11–14 March 2022
Scorecard

Northern Districts	v	Central Districts
172 (62.2 overs); Colin de Grandhomme 37 (59); Raymond Toole 3/33 (14.2 overs)		249 (94.5 overs); Will Young 42 (79); Kris Clarke 3/47 (17.5 overs)
300 (104.4 overs); Colin de Grandhomme 164* (233); Raymond Toole 6/54 (22.4 overs)		82 (51.5 overs); Will Young 20 (48); Brett Randell 6/45 (19 overs)

Northern Districts won by 141 runs
McLean Park, Napier
Umpires: John Dempsey and Wayne Knights

- Central Districts won the toss and elected to field.
- Scott Johnston (Northern Districts) made his first-class debut.

20–23 March 2022
Scorecard

Northern Districts	v	Auckland

Match abandoned
Cobham Oval, Whangārei
Umpires: Billy Bowden and John Bromley

- No toss.
- No play was possible due to rain.

20–23 March 2022
Scorecard

Canterbury	v	Central Districts
438/8d (112 overs); Cole McConchie 187* (246); Raymond Toole 4/119 (30 overs)		203/5d (74 overs); Tom Bruce 90* (152); Zak Foulkes 3/32 (12 overs)
81/3d (10.3 overs); Ken McClure 36 (35); Raymond Toole 2/36 (5.3 overs)		99/0 (32 overs); Greg Hay 41* (80)

Match drawn
McLean Park, Napier
Umpires: Cory Black and John Dempsey

- Canterbury won the toss and elected to bat.
- Only 16 overs of play was possible on day 2 due to rain.
- Will Clark (Central Districts) and William O’Rourke (Canterbury) both made their first-class debuts.

20–23 March 2022
Scorecard

Wellington	v	Otago
469 (125 overs); Troy Johnson 194* (299); Jarrod McKay 3/99 (22 overs)		164/5d (63 overs); Nick Kelly 48 (84); Nathan Smith 2/34 (16 overs)
0/0d (0 overs)		309/3 (69.2 overs); Dale Phillips 114 (158); Iain McPeake 2/36 (8 overs)

Otago won by 7 wickets
University Oval, Dunedin
Umpires: Derek Walker and Tim Parlane

- Otago won the toss and elected to field.
- No play was possible on day 3 due to rain.
- Devan Vishvaka and Tim Robinson (Wellington) both made their first-class debuts.

28–31 March 2022
Scorecard

Auckland	v	Wellington
469/8d (118 overs); Sean Solia 135 (301); Michael Snedden 2/57 (20 overs)		195 (51.4 overs); Tim Robinson 103* (116); Simon Keene 6/51 (13 overs)
9/0 (1.3 overs); William O'Donnell 5* (8)		281 (94.1 overs) (f/o); Rachin Ravindra 58 (161); Louis Delport 3/44 (19.1 overs)

Auckland won by 10 wickets
Eden Park, Auckland
Umpires: Billy Bowden and Cory Black

- Auckland won the toss and elected to bat.
- Sean Solia (Auckland) scored his maiden century in first-class cricket.
- Tim Robinson (Wellington) scored his maiden century in first-class cricket.

29 March – 1 April 2022
Scorecard

Northern Districts	v	Central Districts
496/6d (137 overs); Jeet Raval 209 (373); Ajaz Patel 4/133 (46 overs)		408/7d (135 overs); Tom Bruce 208* (308); Joe Walker 3/99 (35 overs)
25/1 (12 overs); Katene Clarke 11* (36); Will Clark 1/5 (3 overs)

Match drawn
Cobham Oval, Whangārei
Umpires: Derek Walker and John Dempsey

- Northern Districts won the toss and elected to bat.
- Freddy Walker (Northern Districts) made his first-class debut.
- Tom Bruce (Central Districts) scored his maiden double century in first-class cricket.
- No play was possible on day 4 after multiple cases of COVID-19 were reported in the Northern Districts' squad.

29 March – 1 April 2022
Scorecard

Otago	v	Canterbury
257 (98.5 overs); Hamish Rutherford 70 (164); Fraser Sheat 3/55 (21 overs)		369 (104.2 overs); Chad Bowes 100 (168); Jarrod McKay 3/59 (19 overs)
169/6 (64.2 overs); Dale Phillips 97* (175); Will Williams 2/28 (13 overs)

Match drawn
Rangiora Recreation Ground, Rangiora
Umpires: John Bromley and Tim Parlane

- Canterbury won the toss and elected to field.
- Mitchell Hay (Canterbury) made his first-class debut.

5–8 April 2022
Scorecard

Auckland	v	Central Districts
221 (77 overs); Simon Keene 65 (108); Blair Tickner 5/69 (23 overs)		415 (115.4 overs); Tom Bruce 204* (302); Jordan Sussex 3/36 (16.4 overs)
218/6 (94 overs); Ben Horne 89* (92); Ajaz Patel 2/37 (34 overs)

Match drawn
McLean Park, Napier
Umpires: Billy Bowden and John Dempsey

- Central Districts won the toss and elected to field.
- Flynn McGregor-Sumpter and Jordan Sussex (Auckland) both made their first-class debuts.

6–9 April 2022
Scorecard

Northern Districts	v	Wellington
188 (92.3 overs); Chris Swanson 45 (120); Iain McPeake 5/36 (18.3 overs)		296 (101 overs); Devan Vishvaka 80 (137); Ish Sodhi 5/65 (32 overs)
161 (57.5 overs); Peter Drysdale 62 (89); Nathan Smith 5/35 (15 overs)		54/1 (12.4 overs); Rachin Ravindra 29* (40); Peter Drysdale 1/11 (5 overs)

Wellington won by 9 wickets
Cobham Oval, Whangārei
Umpires: Chris Brown and Derek Walker

- Northern Districts won the toss and elected to bat.
- Ben Pomare, Chris Swanson, Fergus Lellman, Josh Brown, Peter Drysdale, Sam Varcoe, Sandeep Patel (Northern Districts) and Kieran McComb (Wellington) all made their first-class debuts.

12–15 April 2022
Scorecard

Canterbury	v	Auckland
325 (92.2 overs); Chad Bowes 127 (166); Louis Delport 7/78 (23.2 overs)		172 (68.1 overs); Will Somerville 37 (92); Theo van Woerkom 5/42 (25 overs)
218/6d (48 overs); Henry Nicholls 72 (74); Will Somerville 4/75 (20 overs)		273 (85.4 overs); William O'Donnell 119* (241); Will Williams 3/37 (10.4 overs)

Canterbury won by 98 runs
Bert Sutcliffe Oval, Lincoln
Umpires: John Dempsey and Wayne Knights

- Canterbury won the toss and elected to bat.
