= New Zealand A cricket team in Sri Lanka in 2026 =

International cricket tour

	Sri Lanka A	New Zealand A
- Dates: 5 – 26 April 2026
Captains	Pasindu Sooriyabandara (First-class); Sahan Arachchige (List A)	Max Chu (List A); Rhys Mariu (First-class)

FC series
- Result: Sri Lanka A won the 2-match series 1–0
Most runs	Sonal Dinusha (183)	Curtis Heaphy (221)
Most wickets	Dilum Sudeera (11)	Tim Pringle (8)

LA series
- Result: Sri Lanka A won the 3-match series 3–0
Most runs	Kamil Mishara (173)	Muhammad Abbas (132)
Most wickets	Wanuja Sahan (6)	Tim Pringle (6); Simon Keene (6)

The New Zealand A cricket team toured Sri Lanka in April 2026 to play against the Sri Lanka A cricket team. The tour consisted of two first-class matches and three List A cricket matches.

== Squads ==
Sri Lanka A	New Zealand A	
First-class & List A	First-class	List A
Pasindu Sooriyabandara (c) (First-class); Sahan Arachchige (c) (List A); Vigneshwaran Akash; Lasith Croospulle; Sonal Dinusha; Nuwanidu Fernando; Ravindu Fernando; Kavija Gamage; Chamika Heenatigala; Lahiru Kumara; Sohan de Livera; Dilshan Madushanka; Pramod Madushan; Ramesh Mendis; Kamil Mishara (wk); Traveen Mathews; Milan Rathnayaka; Pavan Rathnayake; Duvindu Ranathunga; Wanuja Sahan; Dulaj Samuditha; Mohamed Shiraz; Dilum Sudeera; Lahiru Udara; Vijayakanth Viyaskanth; Ahan Wickramasinghe; Isitha Wijesundara	Rhys Mariu (c); Matt Boyle; Max Chu; Rohit Gulati; Ryan Harrison; Mitchell Hay (wk); Curtis Heaphy; Simon Keene; Ben Lister; Jarrod McKay; Dale Phillips; Tim Pringle; Michael Rae; Tim Robinson; Fraser Sheat; Peter Younghusband	Max Chu (c); Muhammad Abbas; Adithya Ashok; Matt Boyle; Kristian Clarke; Rohit Gulati; Mitchell Hay (wk); Curtis Heaphy; Simon Keene; Ben Lister; Rhys Mariu; Dale Phillips; Tim Pringle; Tim Robinson; Ben Sears

== List A series ==
=== 1st Unofficial ODI ===
5 April 2026
10:15
Scorecard

Sri Lanka A 261 (49.2 overs)	v	New Zealand A 121 (28.4 overs)
Kamil Mishara 71 (49); Kristian Clarke 2/42 (9 overs)		Dale Phillips 30 (17); Wanuja Sahan 5/13 (6.4 overs)

Sri Lanka A won by 140 runs
Galle International Stadium, Galle
Umpires: Shantha Fonseka (SL) and Chamara de Zoysa (SL)

- New Zealand A won the toss and elected to field.

=== 2nd Unofficial ODI ===
8 April 2026
10:15
Scorecard

Sri Lanka A 368/9 (50 overs)	v	New Zealand A 158/3 (28 overs)
Lasith Croospulle 103 (76); Tim Pringle 3/28 (7 overs)		Curtis Heaphy 53 (62); Milan Rathnayaka 1/26 (4 overs)

Sri Lanka A won by 44 runs (DLS method)
Mahinda Rajapaksa International Cricket Stadium, Hambantota
Umpires: Hemantha Boteju (SL) and Sanjeewa Fernando (SL)

- Sri Lanka A won the toss and elected to bat.

=== 3rd Unofficial ODI ===
11 April 2026
10:15
Scorecard

New Zealand A 302/7 (50 overs)	v	Sri Lanka A 303/6 (46.2 overs)
Muhammad Abbas 110 (112); Vijayakanth Viyaskanth 2/46 (10 overs)		Kamil Mishara 83 (81); Simon Keene 4/54 (9.2 overs)

Sri Lanka A won by 4 wickets
Mahinda Rajapaksa International Cricket Stadium, Hambantota
Umpires: Sanjeewa Fernando (SL) and Ravindra Kottahachchi (SL)

- New Zealand A won the toss and elected to bat.

== First-class series ==
=== 1st Unofficial Test ===
18–19 April 2026
Scorecard

Sri Lanka A	v	New Zealand A
381 (97.5 overs); Sonal Dinusha 108 (148); Tim Pringle 3/88 (21.5 overs)		479 (153.4 overs); Curtis Heaphy 162 (370); Sonal Dinusha 2/72 (27.4 overs)
168/4 (49 overs); Nuwanidu Fernando 50* (77); Tim Pringle 3/50 (18 overs)

Match drawn
Mahinda Rajapaksa International Cricket Stadium, Hambantota
Umpires: Prageeth Rambukwella (SL) and Chamara de Zoysa (SL)

- Sri Lanka A won the toss and elected to bat.

=== 2nd Unofficial Test ===
23–26 April 2026
Scorecard

New Zealand A	v	Sri Lanka A
305 (87.1 overs); Matt Boyle 102 (116); Dilum Sudeera 6/107 (35.1 overs)		518 (127 overs); Kamil Mishara 174 (168); Dale Phillips 3/44 (7 overs)
104 (31.2 overs); Max Chu 35 (49); Dilum Sudeera 4/38 (13.2 overs)

Sri Lanka A won by an innings and 109 runs
Mahinda Rajapaksa International Cricket Stadium, Hambantota
Umpires: Chandrika Amarasinghe (SL) and Ravindra Kottahachchi (SL)

- New Zealand A won the toss and elected to bat.
