= Australia A cricket team in New Zealand in 2022–23 =

International cricket tour

	New Zealand A	Australia A
- Dates: 1 – 11 April 2023
Captains	Tom Bruce	Aaron Hardie

FC series
- Result: New Zealand A won the 2-match series 1–0
Most runs	Matt Renshaw (332)	Tom Bruce (182)
Most wickets	Mitchell Swepson (9)	Scott Kuggeleijn (9)

The Australia A cricket team toured New Zealand in April 2023 to play the New Zealand A cricket team. The tour consisted of two unofficial Test matches (with first-class status). Both of the matches were played at Bert Sutcliffe Oval in Lincoln. This was Australia A's first tour to New Zealand. The tour was confirmed by New Zealand Cricket in March 2023, with Australia A having arrived in New Zealand on 29 March 2023.

== Squads ==
New Zealand A	Australia A
Tom Bruce (c); Adithya Ashok; Doug Bracewell; Henry Cooper; Jacob Duffy; Dean Foxcroft; Cam Fletcher; Mitchell Hay; Scott Kuggeleijn; Cole McConchie; Robbie O'Donnell; William O’Rourke; Ajaz Patel; Brett Randell; Sean Solia	Aaron Hardie (c); Nathan McSweeney (vc); Wes Agar; Xavier Bartlett; Jordan Buckingham; Caleb Jewell; Spencer Johnson; Campbell Kellaway; Mitchell Perry; Jimmy Peirson; Matt Renshaw; Mitchell Swepson; Tim Ward; Teague Wyllie

== First-class series ==
=== 1st Unofficial Test ===
1–4 April 2023
Scorecard

Australia A	v	New Zealand A
370/6d (106 overs); Matt Renshaw 112 (169); Scott Kuggeleijn 3/94 (21 overs)		224 (61.4 overs); Cole McConchie 74 (142); Spencer Johnson 4/53 (15.4 overs)
218/2d (37 overs); Matt Renshaw 78 (72); Scott Kuggeleijn 2/43 (10 overs)		365/7 (88.4 overs); Dean Foxcroft 97 (150); Xavier Bartlett 3/78 (21 overs)

New Zealand A won by 3 wickets
Bert Sutcliffe Oval, Lincoln
Umpires: Cory Black (NZ) and John Dempsey (NZ)

- New Zealand A won the toss and elected to field.

=== 2nd Unofficial Test ===
8–11 April 2023
Scorecard

Australia A	v	New Zealand A
253 (68.3 overs); Aaron Hardie 115 (160); Logan van Beek 4/72 (21 overs)		246 (70.3 overs); Sean Solia 60 (107); Jordan Buckingham 6/58 (19 over)
366/8 (106 overs); Matt Renshaw 140 (161); Logan van Beek 3/61 (25 overs)		174/3 (42 overs); Henry Cooper 61* (118); Mitchell Swepson 3/85 (18 overs)

Match drawn
Bert Sutcliffe Oval, Lincoln
Umpires: Kannan Jagannathan (NZ) and Tim Parlane (NZ)

- New Zealand A won the toss and elected to field.
- Jordan Buckingham (Aus) took his first five-wicket haul in first-class cricket.
