= Barry Cooper (cricketer) =

New Zealand cricketer

Personal information
- Full name: Barry George Cooper
- Born: 30 November 1958 (age 67); Whangārei, New Zealand
- Batting: Right-handed
- Bowling: Right-arm off-spin
- Relatives: Henry Cooper (son)

Domestic team information
- Years: Team
- 1981/82–1995/96: Northern Districts

Career statistics
| Competition | First-class | List A |
|---|---|---|
| Matches | 62 | 80 |
| Runs scored | 2,982 | 2,009 |
| Batting average | 28.13 | 27.52 |
| 100s/50s | 4/18 | 1/9 |
| Top score | 116* | 102 |
| Balls bowled | 1,705 | 1,650 |
| Wickets | 26 | 34 |
| Bowling average | 30.50 | 30.23 |
| 5 wickets in innings | 1 | 0 |
| 10 wickets in match | 0 | 0 |
| Best bowling | 5/40 | 3/12 |
| Catches/stumpings | 38/– | 34/– |
- Source: Cricinfo, 26 October 2020

Barry George Cooper (born 30 November 1958) is a former New Zealand cricketer who played 62 first-class matches for Northern Districts in the 1980s and in the 1990s. He also played for Northland in the Hawke Cup.

Cooper was born in Whangārei and attended Whangārei Boys' High School. A right-handed batsman, he scored 2,982 runs at a batting average of 28.13 in first class matches. The highest score of his four centuries, an unbeaten 116 runs, came against an England touring side in 1988. He took 26 wickets with his off breaks, with his only five wicket haul, 5 wickets for the cost of 40 runs, coming against Otago. He scored 2,009 runs in 80 list A one-day matches with one century and took 34 one day wickets. He played for Derbyshire Second XI in 1980 and 1981.

Cooper now coaches cricket in Whangārei. His son Henry has played for Northern Districts since the 2016/17 season.
