= Peter Drysdale (cricketer) =

New Zealand cricketer (born 1989)

Personal information
- Full name: Rupert Peter Owens Drysdale
- Born: 7 January 1989 (age 37); Forest Row, East Sussex, England
- Batting: Left-handed
- Bowling: Right-arm offbreak
- Role: Batter

Domestic team information
- Years: Team
- 2009/10–present: Bay of Plenty
- 2021/22–2023/24: Northern Districts

Career statistics
Competition	First-class	List A
Matches	1	7
Runs scored	67	58
Batting average	33.50	19.33
100s/50s	0/1	0/0
Top score	62	28
Balls bowled	78	240
Wickets	1	6
Bowling average	34.00	39.83
5 wickets in innings	0	0
10 wickets in match	0	0
Best bowling	1/11	2/37
Catches/stumpings	0/–	3/–
- Source: Cricinfo, 1 October 2024

Rupert Peter Owens Drysdale (born 7 January 1989) is a New Zealand cricketer who plays for Bay of Plenty and Northern Districts. After playing for the Bay of Plenty team in the Hawke Cup since the 2009/10 cricket season, Drysdale made his first-class cricket debut for Northern Districts in April 2022, in the penultimate match of the 2021–22 Plunket Shield season. Due to an outbreak of COVID-19 within the team, seven players made their first-class debuts for the team in the same match, with Drysdale doing so at the age of 33.

== Personal life ==
Drysdale was born in Forest Row, East Sussex, England in 1989, and now lives in Tauranga, New Zealand. He is the younger brother of New Zealand rower Mahé Drysdale, who has won two gold medals and a bronze at three different editions of the Olympic Games.

== Career ==
Drysdale has played cricket in England, featuring for the second XI for both Derbyshire and Leicestershire during the 2014 and 2015 summers respectively. In 2014, Drysdale also played in the Huddersfield Cricket League in West Yorkshire, England, for Scholes cricket team.

In October 2014, Drysdale became the eleventh cricketer for Bay of Plenty to play in fifty matches for the team. Five years later, in December 2019, Drysdale was only the third cricketer for the team to feature in one hundred matches for the side. In his 100 matches for the team, Drysdale had scored more than 3,000 runs, including three centuries, and had taken 24 wickets. Drysdale had also captained the team during five seasons of the Hawke Cup.

Drysdale was originally scheduled to make his first-class debut for Northern Districts against Auckland in March 2020, during the 2019–20 Plunket Shield season. However, the final two rounds of that tournament were cancelled due to the COVID-19 pandemic.

In April 2022, Northern Districts' penultimate match of the 2021–22 Plunket Shield season, against Central Districts, was abandoned on the fourth and final day after multiple cases of COVID-19 were reported within their squad. Six days later, Northern Districts played their final round-robin match of the 2021–22 Plunket Shield season, against Wellington. Due to the number of COVID-19 cases within the squad, Northern Districts had nineteen players unavailable for their final match of the season. Drysdale, at the age of 33, made his first-class cricket debut in the match. Also making their debuts alongside Drysdale were Ben Pomare, Chris Swanson, Fergus Lellman, Josh Brown, Sam Varcoe and Sandeep Patel. It was the highest number of debutants in the same match for Northern Districts since their inaugural first-class fixture in 1956. In the first innings of the match, Drysdale only scored five runs, before he was dismissed leg before wicket (lbw) by Nathan Smith. On making his debut, Drysdale said it was a great opportunity, but he was mindful of the cricketers in his team who had missed out, as several of them were very ill. In the second innings, Drysdale top-scored for Northern Districts with 62 runs, but the team were all out for 161 runs. With a target of just 54 runs to win the match, Wellington went on to win by nine wickets, with Drysdale taking the one wicket, that of opener Devan Vishvaka.
