= Josh Tasman-Jones =

New Zealand cricketer (born 1990)

Personal information
- Full name: Joshua John Tasman-Jones
- Born: 2 July 1990 (age 36); Auckland, New Zealand
- Batting: Right-handed
- Bowling: Right-arm medium

Domestic team information
- Years: Team
- 2016/17–2021/22: Otago
- Source: CricInfo, 20 January 2019

Joshua John Tasman-Jones (born 2 July 1990) is a New Zealand cricketer. He made his first-class debut for Otago in the 2016–17 Plunket Shield season on 29 March 2017. He made his Twenty20 debut for Otago in the 2018–19 Super Smash on 20 January 2019.

Tasman-Jones was born at Auckland in 1990. He was educated at Westlake Boys High School in the city before attending Massey University. He played age-group and A team cricket for Auckland before moving to Otago. He played seven first-class and eight Twenty20 matches for Otago as well as captaining the Otago A team. In club cricket he played for Albion CC in Dunedin and played in England for Keynsham in 2015 and in 2019 for Bristol Cricket Club, also playing matches for Gloucestershire County Cricket Club's Second XI. In 2022 he was appointed as a selector for the Otago provincial team, before becoming the team's head coach in August 2025.

As well as cricket, Tasman-Jones has played golf since childhood. In 2022 he competed in the New Zealand Amateur Championship.
