= Jordan Sussex =

New Zealand cricketer (born 1994)

Personal information
- Full name: Jordan David Sussex
- Born: 3 March 1994 (age 32); Takapuna, New Zealand
- Batting: Right-handed
- Bowling: Right-arm fast-medium
- Role: Bowler

Domestic team information
- Years: Team
- 2021/22–present: Auckland
- Source: ESPNcricinfo, 19 March 2024

Jordan David Sussex (born 3 March 1994) is a New Zealand cricketer, who is a right-arm fast-medium bowler. He plays for Auckland cricket team in domestic cricket. He made his first-class debut for Auckland on 5 April 2022, against Central Districts in the 2021–22 Plunket Shield season. On 19 March 2024, he took his maiden five-wicket haul in first-class cricket, against Central Districts in the 2023–24 Plunket Shield season.
