= Freddy Walker =

New Zealand cricketer (born 1994)

Personal information
- Full name: Frederick Leonard Walker
- Born: 26 July 1994 (age 32); Hamilton, New Zealand
- Batting: Left-handed
- Bowling: Slow left arm orthodox

Domestic team information
- Years: Team
- 2016/17–2024/25: Northern Districts
- Source: Cricinfo, 1 November 2020

Frederick Leonard Walker (born 26 July 1994) is a New Zealand cricketer. He played in three List A matches for Northern Districts in 2017 and 2018. He made his List A debut for Northern Districts on 15 January 2017 in the 2016–17 Ford Trophy. He made his Twenty20 debut on 1 January 2021, for Northern Districts in the 2020–21 Super Smash. He made his first-class debut on 29 March 2022, for Northern Districts in the 2021–22 Plunket Shield season.

== See also ==
- List of Northern Districts representative cricketers
