= Gareth Severin =

New Zealand cricketer (born 2000)

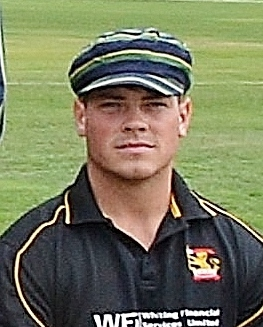

Personal information
- Full name: Gareth Ryan Severin
- Born: 6 January 2000 (age 26); Johannesburg, Gauteng, South Africa
- Batting: Right-handed
- Role: Batter

Domestic team information
- Years: Team
- 2022/23–present: Wellington (squad no. 37)

Career statistics
Competition	FC	LA	T20
Matches	8	5	2
Runs scored	723	102	46
Batting average	48.20	20.40	23.00
100s/50s	2/4	0/0	0/0
Top score	196	35	41
Catches/stumpings	12/–	1/–	0/–
- Source: ESPNcricinfo, 7 March 2024

Gareth Ryan Severin (born 6 January 2000) is a South African-born New Zealand cricketer who plays for Wellington. On 5 March 2023, Severin made his first class cricket debut against Auckland, scoring 80 in the first innings. In July 2023, following successful performances in the 2022–23 Plunket Shield season, he was awarded a contract with Wellington. He plays club cricket for Johnsonville Cricket Club.
