= Simon Keene =

New Zealand cricketer (born 2000)

Personal information
- Full name: Simon Bryan Keene
- Born: 21 October 2000 (age 26); Auckland, New Zealand
- Batting: Right-handed
- Bowling: Right-arm medium-fast
- Role: Bowler

Domestic team information
- Years: Team
- 2021/22–present: Auckland

Career statistics
| Competition | FC | LA | T20 |
|---|---|---|---|
| Matches | 25 | 20 | 8 |
| Runs scored | 976 | 324 | 185 |
| Batting average | 27.11 | 27.00 | 23.12 |
| 100s/50s | 1/5 | 0/1 | 0/1 |
| Top score | 100* | 77 | 81 |
| Balls bowled | 3099 | 633 | 108 |
| Wickets | 55 | 22 | 4 |
| Bowling average | 30.00 | 26.04 | 33.25 |
| 5 wickets in innings | 3 | 1 | 0 |
| 10 wickets in match | 0 | 0 | 0 |
| Best bowling | 6/44 | 5/29 | 2/24 |
| Catches/stumpings | 17/– | 11/– | 4/– |
- Source: Cricinfo, 8 December 2025

Simon Brian Keene (born 21 October 2000) is a New Zealand cricketer who has played 31 first-class and 25 List A matches. A bowler who can bat, Keene has had success playing for the Auckland cricket team. He was the equal third-highest wicket-taker in the 2021–22 Plunket Shield season. His 25 wickets in the season were at the cost of just 14.28 runs apiece.

== Career ==
Before his senior career for Auckland, Keene played seven Youth ODIs for the New Zealand national under-19 cricket team in January 2020, including three matches in the Under-19 Cricket World Cup. In total, he scored 42 runs at a batting average of 7.00 and took 3 wickets at a bowling average of 43.00. In the next season, he played two matches for a New Zealand XI, consisting of mostly young players not appearing for their province in the Super Smash, against the Pakistan Shaheens. In the matches, on 3 January and 5 January, Keene took 4 wickets in total.

Keene made his senior debut as a 20-year-old on 11 February 2022 in the Plunket Shield, batting at 9 and bowling second change. In the game, for Auckland against Otago, he took match figures of 7 wickets for 38 runs conceded (7–38).

One week later, Keene played two List A matches in the Ford Trophy for Auckland. On debut, he took 4–47 off 10 overs to help Auckland to a win. In the second game Keene did not get any wickets, but he did take a catch and was not out in a close run chase. As he did not play in the final of the Ford Trophy, which Auckland won, Keene has not played any further one-day games.

From 3–6 March, Keene played for Auckland against Canterbury in the Plunket Shield. He scored 0 runs in his sole innings, but took 8 wickets including 6–44 to secure a win for Auckland. His next game was on 28 March, against Wellington; he took 6–51 and 2–38 in Auckland's win. The following week he played again, this time against Central Districts, with his first senior cricket fifty – 65 off 108 deliveries – but took no wicket in 20 overs. Keene played also in the final match of the season, against Canterbury, ending up with match figures of 2–70.

Keene received his first professional contract, for Auckland, ahead of the 2022–23 cricket season.
