= Tim Robinson (New Zealand cricketer) =

New Zealand cricketer (born 2002)

Personal information
- Full name: Timothy Blake Robinson
- Born: 28 April 2002 (age 24); Wellington, New Zealand
- Batting: Right-handed
- Bowling: Right-arm medium
- Role: Top-order batter

International information
- National side: New Zealand
- ODI debut (cap 217): 13 November 2024 v Sri Lanka
- Last ODI: 19 November 2024 v Sri Lanka
- T20I debut (cap 101): 18 April 2024 v Pakistan
- Last T20I: 2 May 2026 v Bangladesh

Domestic team information
- Years: Team
- 2021/22–: Wellington
- 2024: Guyana Amazon Warriors
- 2025: Northamptonshire
- 2026/27–: Brisbane Heat

Career statistics
Competition	ODI	T20I	FC	LA
Matches	3	31	27	37
Runs scored	48	665	1,478	940
Batting average	16.00	26.60	32.84	26.85
100s/50s	0/0	1/2	4/8	2/5
Top score	35	106 *	130	113
Catches/stumpings	0/–	18/–	34/–	21/–
- Source: Cricinfo, 2 May 2026

Timothy Blake Robinson (born 28 April 2002) is a New Zealand cricketer. He made his Twenty20 debut on 26 November 2021, for Wellington against Canterbury in the 2021–22 Men's Super Smash. He made his first-class debut on 20 March 2022, for Wellington against Otago in the 2021–22 Plunket Shield season. Later the same month in the Plunket Shield, Robinson scored his maiden century in first-class cricket. He made his List A debut on 22 November 2022, for Wellington against Canterbury in the 2022–23 Ford Trophy. He signed with the Brisbane Heat for the 2026/27 season
