= Dale Phillips =

New Zealand cricketer (born 1998)

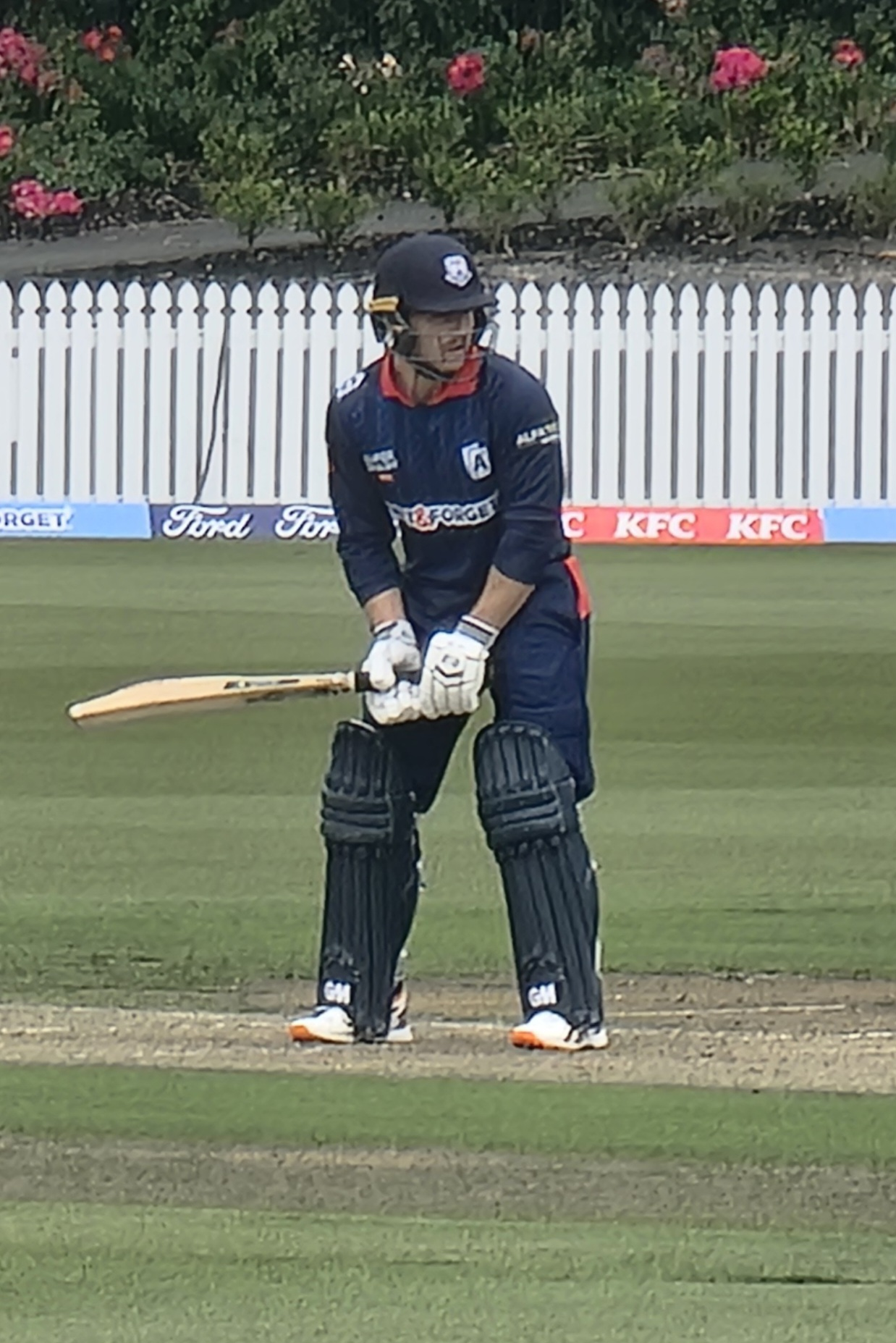
- Phillips playing for the Auckland Aces in 2025.

Personal information
- Full name: Dale Nathan Phillips
- Born: 15 October 1998 (age 28); Johannesburg, Gauteng, South Africa
- Batting: Right-handed
- Bowling: Right-arm fast-medium
- Role: Batsman
- Relatives: Glenn Phillips (brother); Donovan Grobbelaar (brother-in-law)

Domestic team information
- Years: Team
- 2019/20–2024/25: Otago (squad no. 8)
- 2025/26: Auckland
- FC debut: 21 October 2019 Otago v Wellington
- LA debut: 17 November 2019 Otago v Northern Districts

Career statistics
Competition	FC	LA	T20
Matches	41	54	40
Runs scored	2,611	1,334	516
Batting average	36.77	29.64	18.42
100s/50s	7/13	1/7	0/1
Top score	149	107	65
Balls bowled	328	97	22
Wickets	10	2	0
Bowling average	24.40	46.00	–
5 wickets in innings	0	0	–
10 wickets in match	0	0	–
Best bowling	3/21	1/8	–
Catches/stumpings	48/–	29/–	28/1
- Source: CricInfo, 9 April 2025

Dale Nathan Phillips (born 15 October 1998) is a New Zealand cricketer. He was born in South Africa and then educated at Sacred Heart College, Auckland, where he played cricket.

== Domestic career ==
He made his first-class debut on 21 October 2019, for Otago in the 2019–20 Plunket Shield season. Prior to his first-class debut, he was named in New Zealand's squads for the 2016 Under-19 Cricket World Cup and the 2018 Under-19 Cricket World Cup. He made his List A debut on 17 November 2019, for Otago in the 2019–20 Ford Trophy. He made his Twenty20 debut on 30 December 2019, for Otago in the 2019–20 Super Smash.

In June 2020, he was offered a contract by Otago ahead of the 2020–21 domestic cricket season.

== International career ==
Phillips was selected for the New Zealand squad at the 2016 Under-19 Cricket World Cup, as well as the next tournament in 2018.

== Personal life ==
Phillips' brother Glenn is also a cricketer who has represented New Zealand, as well as Otago and formerly in Auckland domestically.
