= Ben Lockrose =

New Zealand cricketer

Personal information
- Full name: Benjamin Nicholas John Lockrose
- Born: 24 March 2000 (age 26); Portsmouth, Hampshire, England
- Batting: Right-handed
- Bowling: Slow left-arm orthodox
- Role: Bowler

Domestic team information
- Years: Team
- 2016/17–: Southland
- 2017/18–: Otago
- T20 debut: 28 December 2017 Otago v Auckland
- FC debut: 6 December 2018 Otago v Central Districts

Career statistics
Competition	FC	LA	T20
Matches	11	33	33
Runs scored	235	248	188
Batting average	13.05	13.05	14.46
100s/50s	0/0	0/0	0/1
Top score	48	31	58*
Balls bowled	1,564	1,421	620
Wickets	16	30	24
Bowling average	63.06	43.00	33.91
5 wickets in innings	0	0	0
10 wickets in match	0	0	0
Best bowling	3/73	3/17	2/23
Catches/stumpings	1/–	5/–	11/–
- Source: Cricinfo, 9 April 2025

Benjamin Nicholas John Lockrose (born 24 March 2000) is a New Zealand cricketer. He made his Twenty20 debut for Otago in the 2017–18 Super Smash on 28 December 2017. Prior to his Twenty20 debut, he was named in New Zealand's squad for the 2018 Under-19 Cricket World Cup.

Lockrose was born at Portsmouth in England and moved to New Zealand when he was five years old and was educated at Otago Boys' High School in Dunedin. He made his List A debut for Otago in the 2018–19 Ford Trophy on 18 November 2018. He made his first-class debut for Otago in the 2018–19 Plunket Shield season on 6 December 2018.
