= Raymond Toole =

New Zealand cricketer (born 1997)

Ray Toole
Personal information
- Full name: Raymond Lawrence Toole
- Born: 30 October 1997 (age 29); Johannesburg, South Africa
- Nickname: Razor
- Batting: Left-handed
- Bowling: Left-arm medium
- Role: Bowler

Domestic team information
- Years: Team
- 2019/20–: Central Districts
- 2022: Essex
- 2023: Durham (squad no. 30)
- 2026: Glamorgan
- FC debut: 30 October 2019 Central Districts v Northern Districts
- LA debut: 17 November 2019 Central Districts v Canterbury

Career statistics
Competition	FC	LA	T20
Matches	51	50	10
Runs scored	164	42	0
Batting average	5.46	3.50	—
100s/50s	0/0	0/0	0/0
Top score	17*	14	0*
Balls bowled	8,914	2,181	192
Wickets	161	60	12
Bowling average	27.28	31.43	29.16
5 wickets in innings	5	1	0
10 wickets in match	0	0	0
Best bowling	7/57	5/72	3/23
Catches/stumpings	11/–	5/–	3/–
- Source: Cricinfo, 27 September 2026

Raymond Lawrence Toole (born 30 October 1997) is a New Zealand cricketer, who is a left-arm medium bowler. He plays for Central Districts in domestic cricket.

He made his first-class debut on 30 October 2019, for Central Districts in the 2019–20 Plunket Shield season. He made his List A debut on 17 November 2019, for Central Districts in the 2019–20 Ford Trophy.

He made his Twenty20 debut for Central Districts, on 27 December 2022, against Wellington in the 2022–23 Men's Super Smash. On 4 April 2023, he took his best bowling figures of 7 for 57 against Auckland, helping his team to win the match by 188 runs and clinch their 12th Plunket Shield title.
