= Michael Rae =

New Zealander cricketer (born 1995)

Personal information
- Full name: Michael David Rae
- Born: 13 June 1995 (age 31); Dunedin, Otago, New Zealand
- Batting: Right-handed
- Bowling: Right-arm medium-fast

International information
- National side: New Zealand
- Test debut (cap 293): 10 December 2025 v West Indies
- Last Test: 18 December 2025 v West Indies

Domestic team information
- Years: Team
- 2014/15–2022/23: Otago
- 2023/24–: Canterbury
- 2024: Warwickshire

Career statistics
| Competition | Test | FC | LA | T20 |
|---|---|---|---|---|
| Matches | 2 | 77 | 50 | 49 |
| Runs scored | 13 | 631 | 179 | 54 |
| Batting average | 13.00 | 9.01 | 14.91 | 10.80 |
| 100s/50s | 0/0 | 0/0 | 0/0 | 0/0 |
| Top score | 13 | 36 | 33 | 16 |
| Balls bowled | 392 | 12,542 | 2,400 | 918 |
| Wickets | 8 | 235 | 77 | 61 |
| Bowling average | 28.25 | 32.02 | 28.32 | 22.39 |
| 5 wickets in innings | 0 | 3 | 3 | 0 |
| 10 wickets in match | 0 | 0 | 0 | 0 |
| Best bowling | 3/45 | 6/31 | 7/35 | 3/13 |
| Catches/stumpings | 2/– | 28/– | 14/– | 12/– |
- Source: Cricinfo, 6 May 2026

Michael David Rae (born 13 June 1995) is a New Zealand first-class cricketer who plays for Canterbury. He made his List A debut for New Zealand XI against Pakistan on 3 January 2018.

He was the joint-leading wicket-taker in the 2017–18 Plunket Shield season for Otago, with 29 dismissals in ten matches. In June 2018, he was awarded a contract with Otago for the 2018–19 season. In June 2020, he was offered a contract by Otago ahead of the 2020–21 domestic cricket season. In November 2020, Rae was named in the New Zealand A cricket team for practice matches against the touring West Indies team.

On 6 December 2020, in the third round of the 2020–21 Ford Trophy, Rae took the third-best figures in a domestic List A match in New Zealand, with 7 for 35 from his 10 overs. In March 2021, in the 2020–21 Plunket Shield season, Rae took a hat-trick against Central Districts.
