= Devan Vishvaka =

New Zealand cricketer

Personal information
- Full name: Kalupahana Liyanage Devan Vishvaka
- Born: 17 October 2000 (age 26); Lower Hutt
- Batting: Right-handed
- Bowling: Legbreak
- Role: Batter

Domestic team information
- Years: Team
- 2021/22– present: Wellington Firebirds

Career statistics
Competition	FC
Matches	3
Runs scored	166
Batting average	33.20
100s/50s	0/2
Top score	80
Catches/stumpings	1/–
- Source: ESPNcricinfo, 5 January 2023

Kalupahana Liyanage Devan Vishvaka (born 17 October 2000) is a New Zealand cricketer, who is a right-handed batsman. He plays for the Wellington Firebirds in domestic cricket. He made his first-class debut for Wellington, on 20 March 2022, against Otago in the 2021–22 Plunket Shield season. He made his Twenty20 debut for the Wellington Firebirds, on 4 January 2023, against the Northern Brave in the 2022–23 Men's Super Smash. He made his List A debut for Wellington on 10 January 2023, against Otago in the 2022–23 Ford Trophy.
