= Henry Cooper (Northern Districts cricketer) =

New Zealand cricketer

Personal information
- Full name: Henry Ross Cooper
- Born: 20 May 1993 (age 33); Whangārei, New Zealand
- Relatives: Barry Cooper (father)

Domestic team information
- Years: Team
- 2016/17–present: Northern Districts
- Source: Cricinfo, 13 November 2020

Henry Ross Cooper (born 20 May 1993) is a New Zealand cricketer. He made his first-class debut for Northern Districts on 22 November 2016 in the 2016–17 Plunket Shield season. In June 2018, he was awarded a contract with Northern Districts for the 2018–19 season. In November 2020, Cooper was named in the New Zealand A cricket team for practice matches against the touring West Indies team. He made his Twenty20 debut on 27 December 2020, for Northern Districts, against Central Stags in the 2020–21 Super Smash. In March 2021, Cooper scored his first century in List A cricket, scoring 146 not out in the preliminary final of the 2020–21 Ford Trophy. In November 2021, in the 2021–22 Plunket Shield season, Cooper scored his maiden double century in first-class cricket.
