= Thorn Parkes =

New Zealand cricketer

Personal information
- Full name: Thorn Kiwa Parkes
- Born: 2000 (age 25–26); Gisborne, New Zealand
- Batting: Left-handed
- Bowling: Right-arm leg-break and googly
- Role: Batter

Domestic team information
- Years: Team
- 2021/22–: Otago

Career statistics
| Competition | FC | LA | T20 |
|---|---|---|---|
| Matches | 30 | 21 | 6 |
| Runs scored | 1,617 | 481 | 42 |
| Batting average | 33.00 | 32.06 | 14.00 |
| 100s/50s | 1/13 | 0/4 | 0/0 |
| Top score | 115 | 78 | 25* |
| Catches/stumpings | 15/– | 6/– | 1/– |
- Source: Cricinfo, 9 March 2026

Thorn Kiwa Parkes (born 2000) is a New Zealand cricketer who has played for Otago since the 2021–22 season.

Born in Gisborne in 2000, Parkes was educated at King's College, Auckland, where he captained the cricket team in 2018. He played Hawke Cup cricket for Poverty Bay between 2015 and 2017.

A middle-order batter, Parkes made his first-class debut playing for Otago in the 2021–22 Plunket Shield, and scored his first century in the final match of the 2022–23 Plunket Shield.
