= Bayley Wiggins =

New Zealand cricketer (born 1998)

Personal information
- Born: 3 September 1998 (age 28); Hastings, New Zealand
- Batting: Right-handed
- Role: Wicket-keeper-batter

Domestic team information
- Years: Team
- 2018/19–present: Central Districts

Career statistics
Competition	FC	LA	T20
Matches	10	21	21
Runs scored	375	660	237
Batting average	25.00	36.66	11.85
100s/50s	1/0	1/3	0/0
Top score	133	103	45
Catches/stumpings	12/0	16/1	8/1
- Source: Cricinfo, 30 April 2025

Bayley Wiggins (born 3 September 1998) is a New Zealand cricketer. He made his Twenty20 debut for Central Districts in the 2018–19 Super Smash on 1 February 2019. He made his List A debut on 29 January 2020, for Central Districts in the 2019–20 Ford Trophy. He made his first-class debut on 23 October 2021, for Central Districts in the 2021–22 Plunket Shield season, and scored a century in the first innings of the match.
