= Danru Ferns =

New Zealand cricketer (born 1994)

Personal information
- Full name: Daniel Kruger Ferns
- Born: 23 February 1994 (age 32); Pretoria, Gauteng, South Africa
- Batting: Right-handed
- Bowling: Right-arm medium-fast
- Role: Bowler

Domestic team information
- Years: Team
- 2016/17–2024/25: Auckland
- 2025/26: Otago
- 2026: Middlesex
- FC debut: 7 November 2017 Auckland v Otago
- LA debut: 4 February 2017 Auckland v Canterbury

Career statistics
Competition	FC	LA	T20
Matches	48	54	41
Runs scored	628	374	158
Batting average	13.65	17.80	11.28
100s/50s	0/1	0/0	0/0
Top score	63*	42*	23
Balls bowled	6,996	2,341	793
Wickets	123	65	49
Bowling average	33.94	37.07	24.91
5 wickets in innings	2	0	0
10 wickets in match	0	0	0
Best bowling	6/62	4/35	4/16
Catches/stumpings	20/–	21/–	10/–
- Source: CricketArchive, 27 September 2026

Daniel Kruger Ferns (born 23 February 1994) is a New Zealand cricketer.

Born at Pretoria in South Africa in 1994, Ferns was educated at Hoërskool Waterkloof in the city. He played age-group cricket for Northerns, before playing for Pretoria University and at academy level for Northerns and Titans. After moving to New Zealand, he made his List A debut for Auckland on 4 February 2017 in the 2016–17 Ford Trophy. He made his first-class debut for Auckland in the 2017–18 Plunket Shield season on 7 November 2017. In June 2018, he was awarded a contract with Auckland for the 2018–19 season. In September 2018, he was named in the Auckland Aces' squad for the 2018 Abu Dhabi T20 Trophy.

In June 2020, he was offered a contract by Auckland ahead of the 2020–21 domestic cricket season. After playing 120 games and taking almost 200 wickets for Auckland across eight seasons, Ferns moved to play for Otago ahead of the 2024–25 season.
