= Callum McLachlan =

New Zealand cricketer (born 1999)

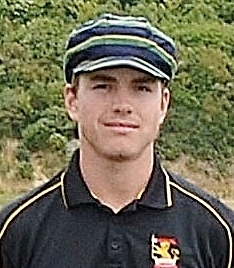

Personal information
- Full name: Callum Ross McLachlan
- Born: 17 May 1999 (age 27); Hutt, Wellington, New Zealand
- Batting: Right-handed
- Role: Wicket-keeper

Domestic team information
- Years: Team
- 2021–present: Wellington
- 2022–present: Wellington Firebirds
- Source: Cricinfo, 7 November 2021

Callum McLachlan (born 17 May 1999) is a New Zealand cricketer. He made his first-class debut on 7 November 2021, for Wellington in the 2021–22 Plunket Shield season. Prior to his first-class debut, he was named in New Zealand's squad for the 2018 Under-19 Cricket World Cup.
