= Max Chu =

New Zealand cricketer

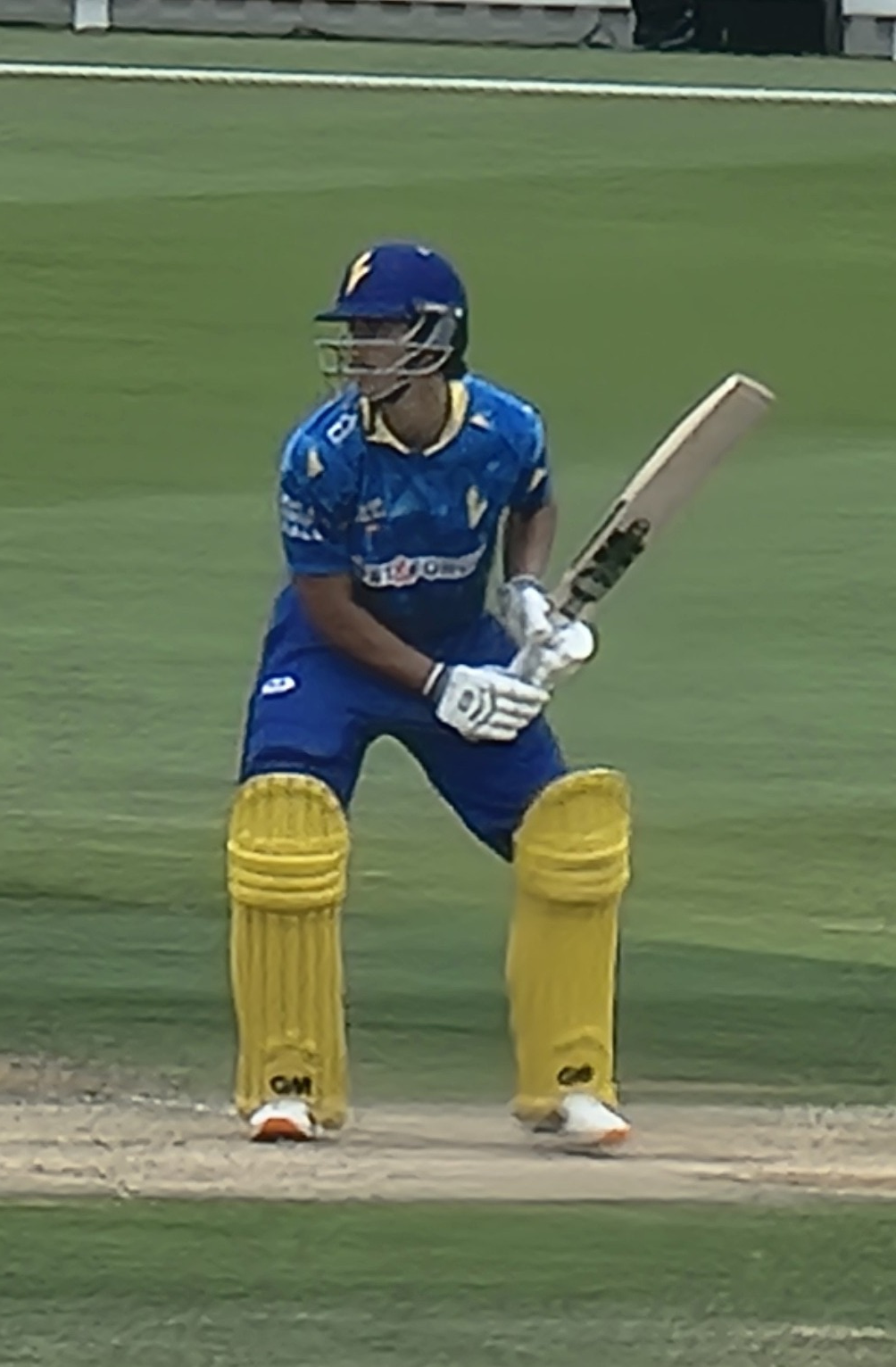
- Chu playing for the Otago Volts in 2026.

Personal information
- Full name: Max Wilkie Chu
- Born: 21 March 2000 (age 26); Dunedin, Otago, New Zealand
- Batting: Left-handed
- Role: Wicket-keeper

Domestic team information
- Years: Team
- 2018/19–: Otago (squad no. 12)
- FC debut: 1 March 2019 Otago v Central Districts
- LA debut: 19 February 2021 Otago v Canterbury

Career statistics
Competition	FC	LA	T20
Matches	42	48	45
Runs scored	2,196	866	468
Batting average	33.78	25.47	19.50
100s/50s	3/9	0/2	0/1
Top score	151	97	82
Catches/stumpings	126/4	52/9	15/10
- Source: CricInfo, 23 December 2025

Max Wilkie Chu (born 21 March 2000) is a New Zealand cricketer. He made his first-class debut for Otago in the 2018–19 Plunket Shield season on 1 March 2019. Prior to his first-class debut, he was named in New Zealand's squad for the 2018 Under-19 Cricket World Cup. In February 2019, he also played for the New Zealand XI side in a 50-over tour match against Bangladesh. He made his Twenty20 debut on 14 December 2019, for Otago in the 2019–20 Super Smash.

In June 2020, he was offered a contract by Otago ahead of the 2020–21 domestic cricket season. He made his List A debut on 19 February 2021, for Otago in the 2020–21 Ford Trophy. In November 2021, in the 2021–22 Plunket Shield season, Chu scored his maiden century in first-class cricket with 103 not out. In 2025 Chu played in the Canada Super60 T10 cricket competition for Vancouver Knights.

== Personal life ==
Chu was born at Dunedin in 2000 and educated at Otago Boys' High School in the city. He played cricket at school and was head boy in 2017.
