= Matthew Bacon (cricketer) =

New Zealand cricketer (born 1993)

Personal information
- Full name: Matthew Boyce Bacon
- Born: 13 April 1993 (age 33); Auckland, New Zealand
- Batting: Right-handed
- Bowling: Right-arm medium-fast
- Role: Bowler

Domestic team information
- Years: Team
- 2015/16: Wellington
- 2017/18–: Otago (squad no. 34)
- FC debut: 5 February 2016 Wellington v Otago
- LA debut: 31 January 2018 Otago v Wellington

Career statistics
Competition	FC	LA	T20
Matches	32	71	52
Runs scored	414	232	51
Batting average	12.93	10.54	6.37
100s/50s	0/0	0/0	0/0
Top score	47*	21*	15*
Balls bowled	4511	2963	1080
Wickets	85	98	59
Bowling average	32.58	28.56	26.33
5 wickets in innings	2	2	1
10 wickets in match	1	0	0
Best bowling	6/73	5/38	5/28
Catches/stumpings	15/–	13/–	14/–
- Source: Cricinfo, 21 March 2026

Matthew Boyce Bacon (born 13 April 1993) is a New Zealand cricketer who plays for Otago. He was born at Auckland in 1993.

Bacon made his first-class debut in February 2016 in the 2015–16 Plunket Shield for Wellington against Otago. After making three appearances during the season for Wellington, he moved to Otago ahead of the 2017/18 season and made his Twenty20 debut for Otago in the 2017–18 Super Smash in January 2018 and his List A debut in the 2017–18 Ford Trophy on 31 January 2018. In June 2018, he was awarded a contract with Otago for the 2018–19 season and in June 2020 was offered a contract by Otago ahead of the 2020–21 domestic cricket season.
