= Jake Gibson =

New Zealand cricketer (born 1997)

Personal information
- Full name: Jacob Michael Gibson
- Born: 7 August 1997 (age 29); Hamilton, Waikato, New Zealand
- Batting: Right-handed
- Bowling: Right-arm medium
- Role: All-rounder
- Relatives: Zak Gibson (cousin)

Domestic team information
- Years: Team
- 2015/16–2018/19: Waikato Valley
- 2019/20–2020/21: Northern Districts
- 2021/22–: Otago
- FC debut: 23 October 2021 Otago v Wellington
- LA debut: 5 February 2020 Northern Districts v Auckland

Career statistics
Competition	FC	LA	T20
Matches	17	20	26
Runs scored	540	218	370
Batting average	22.50	15.57	19.47
100s/50s	0/5	0/2	0/3
Top score	68	59	96
Balls bowled	1,864	701	260
Wickets	24	24	13
Bowling average	48.37	27.75	28.15
5 wickets in innings	0	1	0
10 wickets in match	0	0	0
Best bowling	4/58	5/31	3/19
Catches/stumpings	11/–	9/–	18/–
- Source: CricInfo, 25 March 2025

Jacob Michael Gibson (born 7 August 1997) is a New Zealand cricketer. He made his List A debut on 5 February 2020, for Northern Districts in the 2019–20 Ford Trophy, taking a five-wicket haul. He made his first-class debut on 23 October 2021, for Otago in the 2021–22 Plunket Shield season. He made his Twenty20 debut on 28 November 2021, for Otago in the 2021–22 Men's Super Smash.
