= Luke Georgeson =

New Zealand cricketer

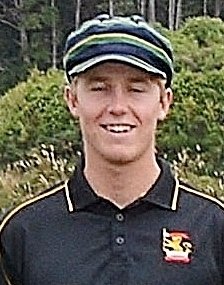

Personal information
- Full name: Luke Ian Georgeson
- Born: 14 April 1999 (age 27); Wellington, New Zealand
- Batting: Left-handed
- Bowling: Right-arm medium-fast
- Role: All-rounder

Domestic team information
- Years: Team
- 2019/20–2022/23: Wellington (squad no. 26)
- 2021: Northern Knights
- 2023/24–: Otago (squad no. 26)
- FC debut: 11 March 2021 Wellington v Central Districts
- LA debut: 5 February 2020 Wellington v Central Districts

Career statistics
Competition	FC	LA	T20
Matches	29	32	16
Runs scored	1,200	1,103	204
Batting average	22.64	35.58	18.54
100s/50s	1/6	2/6	0/1
Top score	159*	128	51
Balls bowled	2,584	819	186
Wickets	43	32	11
Bowling average	32.74	22.81	25.09
5 wickets in innings	1	2	0
10 wickets in match	0	0	0
Best bowling	5/60	5/11	2/8
Catches/stumpings	21/–	16/–	10/–
- Source: Cricinfo, 25 March 2025

Luke Ian Georgeson (born 14 April 1999) is a New Zealand cricketer. Georgeson holds an Irish passport, and became eligible to represent the Ireland cricket team in early 2022.

== Career ==
Georgeson made his List A debut on 5 February 2020, for Wellington in the 2019–20 Ford Trophy in New Zealand. Prior to his List A debut, he was named in New Zealand's squad for the 2018 Under-19 Cricket World Cup. He made his first-class debut on 11 March 2021, for Wellington in the 2020–21 Plunket Shield season.

In April 2021, Georgeson was named in the Northern Knights' squad ahead of the domestic season in Ireland. He made his Twenty20 debut on 18 June 2021, for Northern Knights in the 2021 Inter-Provincial Trophy. He also finished as the third-highest run-scorer in the 2021 Inter-Provincial Cup, with 317 runs.

In April 2022, Georgeson switched his allegiance from New Zealand to Ireland, and was offered a central contract by Cricket Ireland. Later the same month, Georgeson withdrew from this contract with a view to playing for New Zealand.

Ahead of the 2023–24 domestic first-class season, Georgeson moved to play for Otago, making his debut for the side in the first Plunket Shield match of the season. On 18 February 2024, he took his maiden List A five-wicket haul, against Wellington in the 2023–24 Ford Trophy; the following month he claimed his maiden first-class five-wicket haul, playing against Canterbury.
