= Louis Delport =

South African cricketer (born 1988)

Louis Delport (born 12 February 1988) is a South African cricketer. He made his first-class debut for Western Province in the 2014–15 Sunfoil 3-Day Cup on 30 October 2014. In April 2018, he played for Auckland in the 2017–18 Plunket Shield season in New Zealand. He made his List A debut on 17 November 2019, for Auckland in the 2019–20 Ford Trophy. In February 2020, in the match against Otago in the 2019–20 Plunket Shield season, Delport took his maiden five-wicket haul in first-class cricket.

In June 2020, he was offered a contract by Auckland ahead of the 2020–21 domestic cricket season. In March 2021, in the 2020–21 Plunket Shield season Delport took a hat-trick in the match against Northern Districts.

In January 2023, Delport was hit for five consecutive sixes in an over of a T20 match by Central Districts batsman Will Young. However, he dismissed Young in the final ball of the over while attempting to hit the rare six sixes in an over feat.
