= Will Clark (cricketer) =

New Zealand cricketer

Personal information
- Full name: William James Clark
- Born: 5 September 2001 (age 25); Hastings, Hawke's Bay, New Zealand
- Batting: Right-handed
- Bowling: Right-arm medium-fast
- Role: All-rounder

Domestic team information
- Years: Team
- 2021/22–present: Central Districts

Career statistics
Competition	FC	LA	T20
Matches	16	28	29
Runs scored	559	474	398
Batting average	29.42	31.60	20.94
100s/50s	1/3	0/2	0/0
Top score	109	59	44*
Balls bowled	1,110	354	48
Wickets	19	9	4
Bowling average	38.15	42.11	19.50
5 wickets in innings	1	0	0
10 wickets in match	0	–	–
Best bowling	5/62	2/17	2/31
Catches/stumpings	19/–	7/–	7/–
- Source: Cricinfo, 26 January 2026

William James Clark (born 5 September 2001) is a New Zealand cricketer who has played for Central Districts since the 2021–22 season.

Clark was born in Hastings. A middle-order batsman and medium-fast bowler, he has played Hawke Cup cricket for Hawke's Bay since 2019–20.

Clark made his first-class debut in the 2021–22 Plunket Shield. In the 2024–25 Plunket Shield, in Central Districts' match against Northern Districts, he took 5 for 62 in Northern Districts' first innings, then made 109 in Central Districts' first innings.

Clark played club cricket in England for Bromley Common CC in the Kent Cricket League in 2025 and 2026.
