= Brett Randell =

New Zealand cricketer (born 1995)

Personal information
- Full name: Brett Graham Randell
- Born: 20 May 1995 (age 31); Auckland, New Zealand
- Batting: Right-handed
- Bowling: Right-arm medium
- Role: Bowler

Domestic team information
- Years: Team
- 2016/17–2021/22: Northern Districts
- 2022/23–present: Central Districts
- 2024: Somerset
- 2026: Derbyshire
- First-class debut: 21 March 2017 Northern Districts v Wellington
- List A debut: 18 January 2017 Northern Districts v Canterbury

Career statistics
Competition	FC	LA	T20
Matches	44	54	45
Runs scored	1,011	212	66
Batting average	17.43	10.09	11.00
100s/50s	0/5	0/0	0/0
Top score	90*	25	12*
Balls bowled	6,731	2,198	1,331
Wickets	133	100	48
Bowling average	24.36	21.98	27.72
5 wickets in innings	3	4	0
10 wickets in match	0	0	0
Best bowling	7/25	5/22	3/25
Catches/stumpings	16/–	20/–	19/–
- Source: ESPNcricinfo, 27 September 2026

Brett Graham Randell (born 20 May 1995) is a New Zealand cricketer. He made his List A debut for Northern Districts on 18 January 2017 in the 2016–17 Ford Trophy. Prior to his List A debut, he was part of New Zealand's squad for the 2014 Under-19 Cricket World Cup.

He made his first-class debut for Northern Districts on 21 March 2017 in the 2016–17 Plunket Shield season. He made his Twenty20 debut for Northern Districts in the 2017–18 Super Smash on 15 December 2017. In June 2018, he was awarded a contract with Northern Districts for the 2018–19 season.

In March 2023, he earned his maiden call-up to the New Zealand A cricket team for their first-class series against Australia.

In August 2024, Randell signed for Somerset County Cricket Club as an overseas player for their final three 2024 County Championship Division One fixtures.

On 8 March 2026, Randell took five wickets in five balls in a Plunket Shield match, becoming the first player to do so in first-class cricket.
