= Sean Solia =

New Zealand-Samoan cricketer

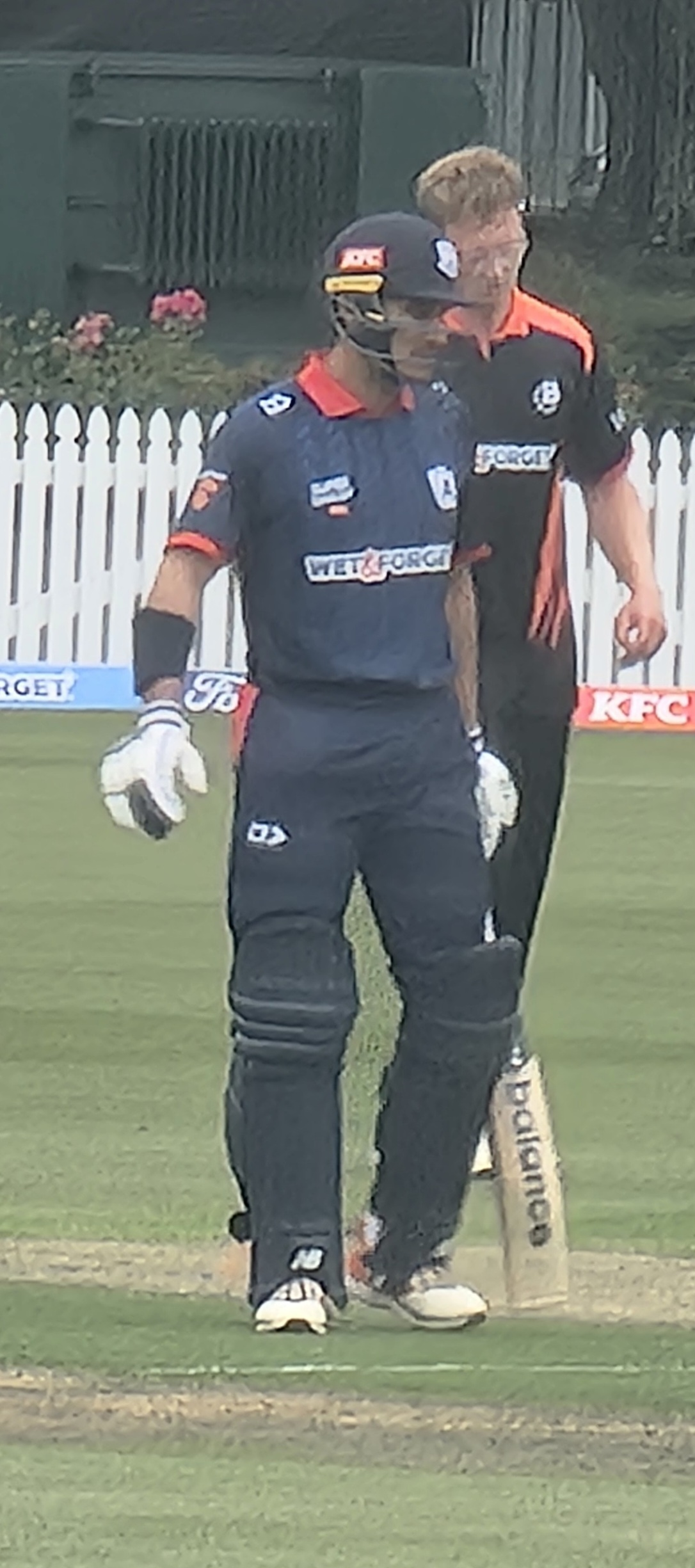
- Solia playing for the Auckland Aces in 2025

Personal information
- Full name: Sean Mikaele Solia
- Born: 15 December 1992 (age 33); Auckland, New Zealand
- Batting: Left-handed
- Bowling: Right-arm medium
- Role: All-rounder

International information
- National side: Samoa (2018–present)
- T20I debut (cap 38): 8 October 2025 v Oman
- Last T20I: 18 May 2026 v Cook Islands
- T20I shirt no.: 10

Domestic team information
- Years: Team
- 2016/17–: Auckland
- 2026: Edinburgh Castle Rockers

Career statistics
Competition	T20I	FC	LA	T20
Matches	12	75	88	95
Runs scored	338	3,900	2,320	1,573
Batting average	30.72	32.77	31.35	21.25
100s/50s	0/2	4/26	3/11	0/6
Top score	74	206	152	75
Balls bowled	12	5,452	1,932	725
Wickets	0	106	53	28
Bowling average	–	27.98	34.66	40.35
5 wickets in innings	–	1	0	0
10 wickets in match	–	0	0	0
Best bowling	–	5/8	4/38	2/8
Catches/stumpings	2/–	30/–	25/–	26/–
- Source: Cricinfo, 25 September 2016

Sean Mikaele Solia (born 15 December 1992) is a New Zealand-Samoan cricketer. He plays international cricket for Samoa, and has played domestic cricket in New Zealand for Auckland since 2016.

== Early life ==
Solia was in Auckland, where he attended St Peter's College. His father is Samoan.

== Domestic career ==
Solia made his first-class debut for Auckland against Canterbury on 22 November 2016 in the 2016–17 Plunket Shield season. His Twenty20 debut followed on 4 December 2016 for the Auckland Aces in the 2016–17 Super Smash. He made his List A debut for Auckland on 15 January 2017 in the 2016–17 Ford Trophy, scoring 152 runs. In June 2018, he was awarded a contract with Auckland for the 2018–19 season. In September 2018, he was named in the Auckland Aces' squad for the 2018 Abu Dhabi T20 Trophy.

In June 2020, he was offered a contract by Auckland ahead of the 2020–21 domestic cricket season. In March 2022, during the 2021–22 Plunket Shield season, Solia scored his maiden first-class century.

== International career ==
He was part of Samoa's squad for Group A of the 2018–19 ICC World Twenty20 East Asia-Pacific Qualifier. In Samoa's opening match of the qualifier, against Papua New Guinea, he top-scored with 39 runs. He was the joint-leading wicket-taker in the tournament, with eleven wickets in six matches.

In November 2020, Solia was named in the New Zealand A squad for practice matches against the touring West Indies.
