= Jarrod McKay =

New Zealand cricketer (born 2000)

Personal information
- Full name: Jarrod Douglas McKay
- Born: 8 June 2000 (age 26); Nelson, New Zealand
- Batting: Right-handed
- Bowling: Right-arm medium-fast
- Role: Bowler

Domestic team information
- Years: Team
- 2017/18–2019/20: Nelson
- 2019/20: Central Districts
- 2020/21–: Otago
- FC debut: 30 October 2019 Central Districts v Northern Districts
- LA debut: 1 December 2020 Otago v Central Districts

Career statistics
Competition	FC	LA	T20
Matches	25	8	1
Runs scored	111	29	–
Batting average	7.40	9.66	–
100s/50s	0/0	0/0	–
Top score	20*	14	–
Balls bowled	3,439	348	–
Wickets	58	10	–
Bowling average	41.12	39.30	–
5 wickets in innings	0	0	–
10 wickets in match	0	0	–
Best bowling	4/84	2/29	–
Catches/stumpings	15/–	4/–	0/–
- Source: CricInfo, 9 April 2025

Jarrod Douglas McKay (born 8 June 2000) is a New Zealand cricketer. He made his first-class debut on 30 October 2019, for Central Districts in the 2019–20 Plunket Shield season. He made his List A debut on 1 December 2020, for Central Districts in the 2020–21 Ford Trophy. He made his Twenty20 debut on 6 January 2023, for the Otago Volts in the 2022–23 Men's Super Smash.

McKay was educated at Nelson College from 2014 to 2018.
