= Tim Pringle =

Dutch cricketer (born 2002)

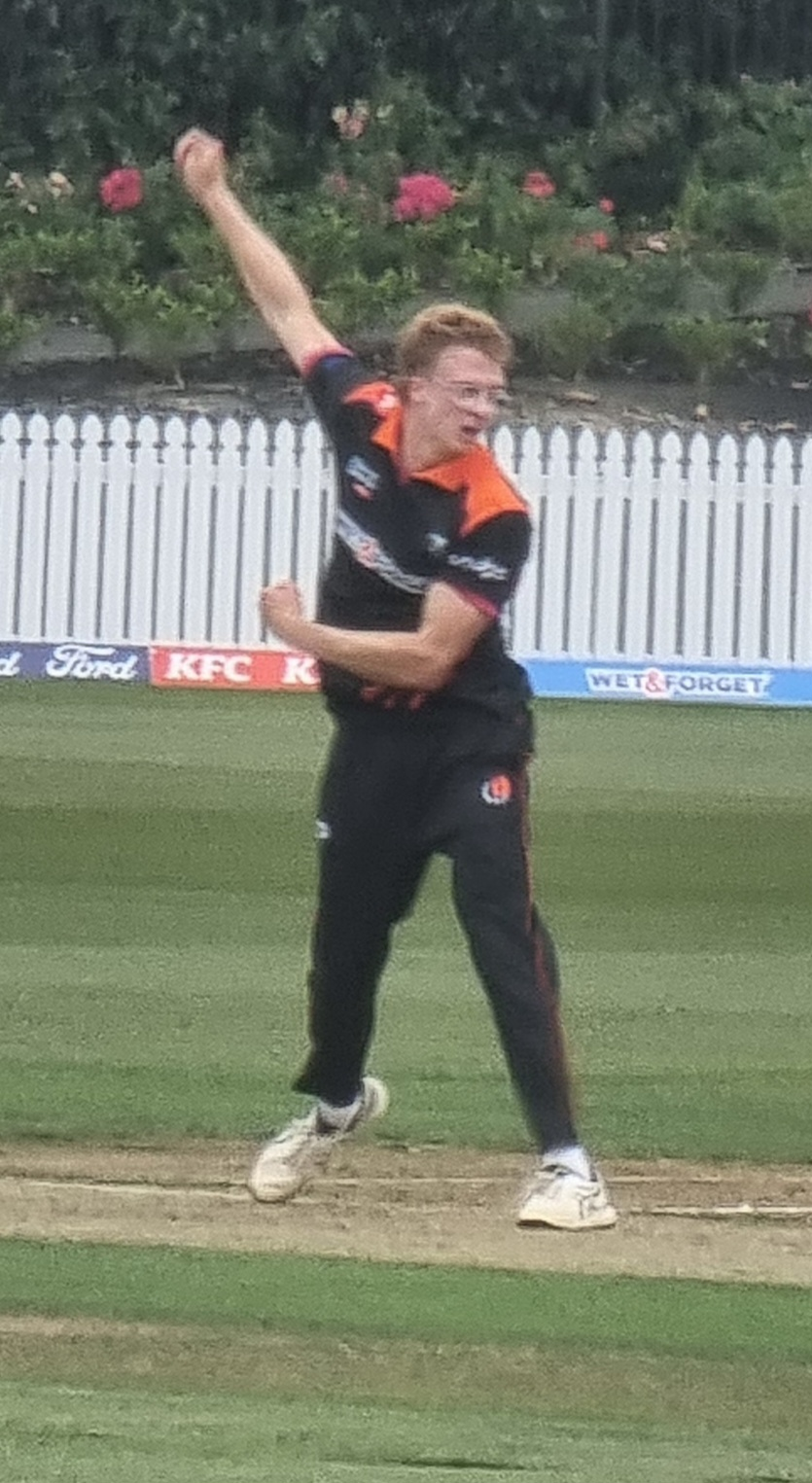
- Pringle playing for Northern Districts in 2025.

Personal information
- Full name: Timothy James Gerard Pringle
- Born: 29 August 2002 (age 24); The Hague, Netherlands
- Batting: Right-handed
- Bowling: Slow left-arm orthodox
- Role: Bowling-all rounder
- Relatives: Chris Pringle (father)

International information
- National side: Netherlands (2022–present)
- ODI debut (cap 82): 19 June 2022 v England
- Last ODI: 31 July 2026 v Namibia
- ODI shirt no.: 11
- T20I debut (cap 54): 11 July 2022 v PNG
- Last T20I: 3 September 2025 v Bangladesh
- T20I shirt no.: 11

Domestic team information
- Years: Team
- 2022/23–: Northern Districts
- 2026: Amsterdam Flames

Career statistics
| Competition | ODI | T20I | FC | LA |
|---|---|---|---|---|
| Matches | 5 | 22 | 15 | 36 |
| Runs scored | 10 | 121 | 330 | 292 |
| Batting average | 2.00 | 9.30 | 17.36 | 14.60 |
| 100s/50s | 0/0 | 0/0 | 0/0 | 0/0 |
| Top score | 6 | 35* | 36* | 34 |
| Balls bowled | 253 | 420 | 3,546 | 1,716 |
| Wickets | 2 | 18 | 55 | 39 |
| Bowling average | 131.00 | 25.16 | 33.70 | 34.71 |
| 5 wickets in innings | 0 | 0 | 0 | 0 |
| 10 wickets in match | 0 | 0 | 0 | 0 |
| Best bowling | 1/41 | 3/20 | 4/38 | 4/29 |
| Catches/stumpings | 0/– | 6/– | 7/– | 5/– |
- Source: Cricinfo, 31 July 2026

Timothy James Gerard Pringle (born 29 August 2002) is a Dutch cricketer. He has played for the Netherlands national cricket team since 2022 as a left-arm orthodox spin bowler.

== Personal life ==
Pringle was born in 2002 in The Hague. His father Chris Pringle played international cricket for New Zealand, later playing and coaching in the Netherlands; his mother Janine (née Scholten) is Dutch.

Pringle grew up in Tauranga, New Zealand, and began attending a cricket academy at the age of seven. He attended Tauranga Boys College.

== Domestic career ==
Pringle played his early cricket in New Zealand including for Bay of Plenty and Northern Districts development squads.

In 2022 Pringle began playing Dutch club cricket for Haagsche Cricket Club (HCC) in the Topklasse.

== International career ==
In June 2022, he was named in the Dutch One Day International (ODI) squad for their series against England. He made his ODI debut on 19 June 2022, against England. Prior to making his international debut for the Netherlands, Pringle played for the New Zealand national under-19 cricket team.

In July 2022, he was named in the Netherlands' Twenty20 International (T20I) squad for the 2022 ICC Men's T20 World Cup Global Qualifier B tournament in Zimbabwe. He made his T20I debut on 11 July 2022, for the Netherlands against Papua New Guinea. He was economical in his debut game, bowling 3 overs for 17 runs, but did not get a wicket.

In May 2024, he was named in the Netherlands squad for the 2024 ICC Men's T20 World Cup tournament.
