= Chad Bowes =

South African-born New Zealand cricketer (born 1992)

Personal information
- Full name: Chad Jayson Bowes
- Born: 19 October 1992 (age 34); Benoni, Transvaal, South Africa
- Batting: Right-handed
- Bowling: Right-arm medium-fast
- Role: Top-order batter

International information
- National side: New Zealand
- ODI debut (cap 208): 25 March 2023 v Sri Lanka
- Last ODI: 23 September 2023 v Bangladesh
- T20I debut (cap 96): 2 April 2023 v Sri Lanka
- Last T20I: 20 August 2023 v UAE

Domestic team information
- Years: Team
- 2010/11–2014/15: KwaZulu-Natal
- 2015/16–: Canterbury
- 2023: Galle Titans

Career statistics
Competition	ODI	T20I	FC	LA
Matches	6	11	101	107
Runs scored	99	187	4,738	3,757
Batting average	16.50	17.00	29.79	39.13
100s/50s	0/1	0/1	12/16	9/14
Top score	51	54	155	205
Balls bowled	–	–	217	12
Wickets	–	–	1	0
Bowling average	–	–	129.00	–
5 wickets in innings	–	–	0	–
10 wickets in match	–	–	0	–
Best bowling	–	–	1/22	–
Catches/stumpings	4/–	4/–	70/–	57/–
- Source: ESPNCricinfo, 1 January 2026

Chad Jayson Bowes (born 19 October 1992) is a South African–born New Zealand cricketer who captained the South Africa Under-19 cricket team and played for the domestic side KwaZulu-Natal. In October 2015 he joined the Sydenham Cricket Club in Christchurch, New Zealand, coached by former Black Caps Chris Harris. He made his ODI debut for New Zealand on 25 March 2023. On 23 October 2024, Bowes set a new world record for the fastest double century in men's List A cricket.

== Personal life ==
Bowes was born in Benoni in the South African province of Transvaal. He studied in Kearsney College, Durban.

== Early career ==
=== 2012 Under-19 Cricket World Cup ===
After getting the chance to lead the Under-19 cricket team of South Africa in 2012 ICC Under-19 Cricket World Cup, he scored 115 runs off 115 balls against Namibia while building a 212 runs partnership with Quinton de Kock in the second group match. The team won by a massive 209 runs. They also won the 3rd match against Sri Lanka by 4 wickets. Bowes scored 46 runs off 51 balls in the match. They progressed to the knock-out stage as group champions and beat England there by 103 runs to reach the semis. Bowes scored 46 runs off 54 balls in the match. Despite their good form throughout the tournament, they lost to Australia in the first semi-final by 4 wickets. Coming to bat first, South Africa faced an early breakdown. But then Bowes and Murray Coetzee built the innings to take the team to 191/8 in 50 overs. But it wasn't enough as the Aussies beat them in the penultimate over chasing down the target successfully. Bowes scored 46 off 104 balls in the match. In the 3rd place match of the under-19 world cup against New Zealand, they dismissed the Kiwis for less than 90 and won by 8 wickets to become the 3rd placed team in the tournament. Bowes was among the leading run-getters of the tournament.

== Later career ==
Frustrated by South Africa's domestic quota system, in October 2015 Bowes moved to Christchurch, New Zealand. Bowes' agent Patrick Steytler and Stephen Fleming facilitated his move to the Sydenham Cricket Club. His dream was to play for the New Zealand cricket team, following in the footsteps of compatriots Grant Elliott, Neil Wagner and Kruger van Wyk. He made his debut for Canterbury in February 2016 against Central Districts. In November 2016 he scored his maiden century for Sydenham and followed that up with his maiden century for Canterbury a week later.

He was the leading run-scorer in the 2017–18 Plunket Shield season for Canterbury, with 570 runs in ten matches. In June 2018, he was awarded a contract with Canterbury for the 2018–19 season. He was also the leading run-scorer for Canterbury in the 2018–19 Ford Trophy, with 414 runs in nine matches, and in the 2018–19 Super Smash, with 276 runs in ten matches.

In June 2020, he was offered a contract by Canterbury ahead of the 2020–21 domestic cricket season.

On 23 October 2024, Bowes set a new world record for the fastest double century in men's List A cricket by scoring 200 off 103 balls for Canterbury against Otago Volts.

== International career ==
In March 2023, Bowes earned his maiden call-up to the New Zealand cricket team for their ODI series against Sri Lanka. He made his ODI debut in first ODI of the series on 25 March 2023. Later the same month, he was named in Twenty20 International (T20I) squad for the same series. He made his T20I debut in the first T20I of the series on 2 April 2023.
