= John Dempsey (umpire) =

New Zealand cricket umpire

Personal information
- Full name: John Michael Dempsey
- Born: 28 September 1965 (age 61); Papakura, New Zealand

Umpiring information
- WODIs umpired: 11 (2016–2023)
- WT20Is umpired: 10 (2020–2023)
- Source: Cricinfo, 13 February 2023

John Dempsey (born 28 September 1965) is a New Zealand cricket umpire. He has stood in domestic matches in the 2017–18 Plunket Shield season and the 2017–18 Ford Trophy. He has also umpired in international matches featuring the New Zealand women's cricket team.
