= Tim Parlane =

Cricket umpire

Personal information
- Full name: Timothy James Parlane
- Born: 28 December 1957 (age 68); Auckland, New Zealand

Umpiring information
- WODIs umpired: 3 (2012–2015)
- WT20Is umpired: 4 (2008–2010)
- Source: Cricinfo, 15 March 2016

Timothy James Parlane (born 28 December 1957) is a former New Zealand cricket umpire. Along with Wayne Knights he umpired the final of the 2015–16 Ford Trophy in January 2016.

Parlane umpired his first List A match in January 2002 and his maiden first-class match in February 2004. He retired after the 2023–24 season after umpiring 130 first-class and 141 List A matches.
