= Robert O'Donnell (cricketer) =

New Zealand cricketer

Robbie O'Donnell
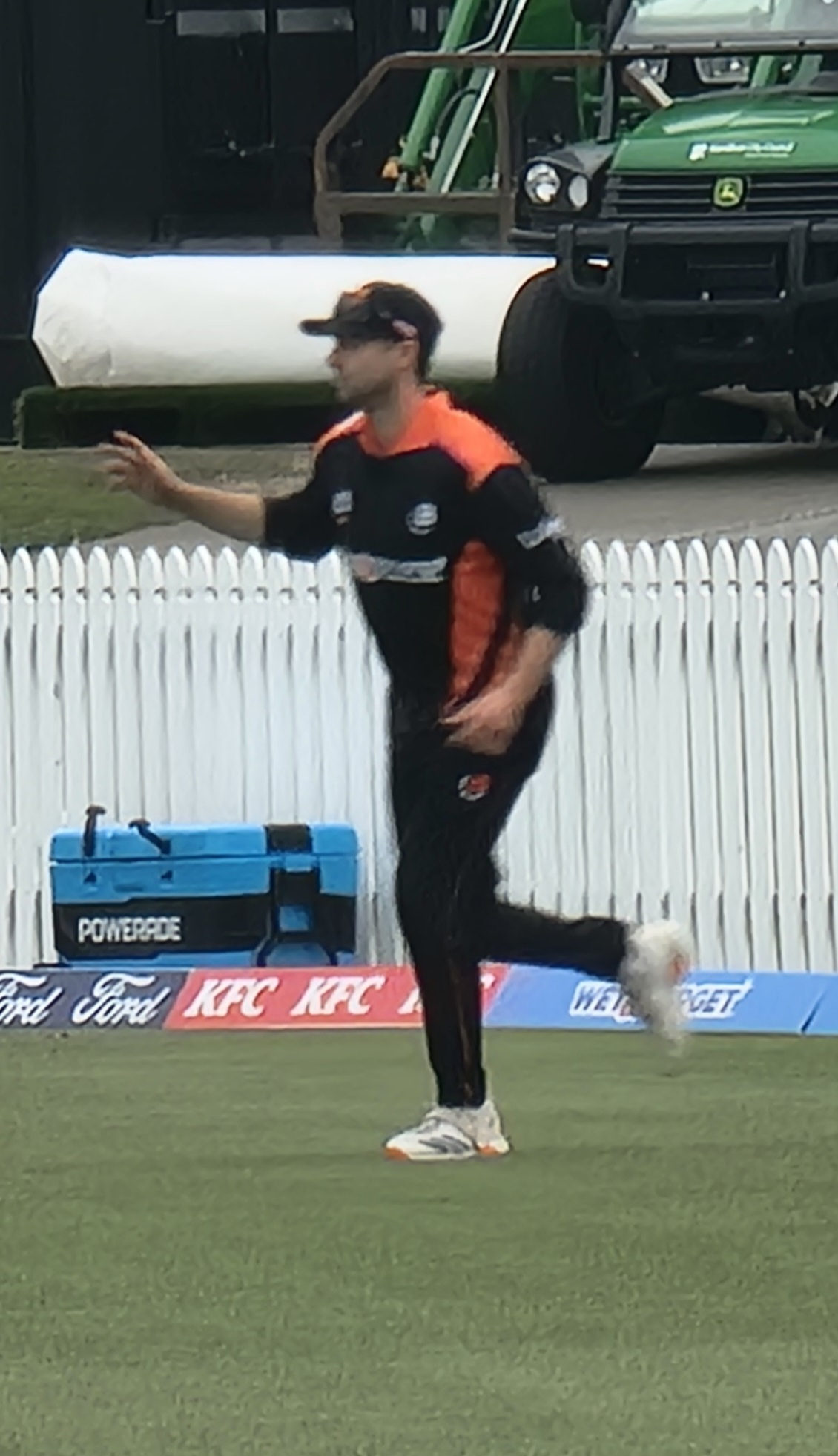
- O'Donnell playing for Northern Districts in 2025.

Personal information
- Full name: Robert Roux O'Donnell
- Born: 12 September 1994 (age 32); Auckland, New Zealand
- Batting: Right-handed
- Bowling: Right-arm medium
- Role: Batsman

Domestic team information
- Years: Team
- 2013/14–2023/24: Auckland
- 2024/25–: Northern Districts

Career statistics
Competition	FC	LA	T20
Matches	90	98	85
Runs scored	5,041	2,951	1,834
Batting average	35.00	35.13	35.96
100s/50s	10/23	4/18	0/12
Top score	223	115	73*
Balls bowled	1,131	324	42
Wickets	15	9	1
Bowling average	41.13	33.11	69.00
5 wickets in innings	1	0	0
10 wickets in match	0	0	0
Best bowling	5/47	2/19	1/30
Catches/stumpings	109/–	45/–	36/–
- Source: Cricinfo, 25 January 2026

Robert Roux O'Donnell (born 12 September 1994) is a New Zealand cricketer.

== Under-19s career ==
In the 2014 Under-19 World Cup, he was named captain of the New Zealand team. O'Donnell was part of the squad for the previous edition of the tournament in 2012 in which New Zealand reached the semi-finals. O'Donnell scored an unbeaten century and helped the team comprehensively defeat the United Arab Emirates Under-19s by 112 runs in Sharjah.

== Domestic career ==
He made 80 for New Zealand XI against an Indian attack that read Zaheer Khan, Umesh Yadav, Ishant Sharma, Ravichandran Ashwin and Ishwar Pandey in a tour match. In June 2018, he was awarded a contract with Auckland for the 2018–19 season. In September 2018, he was named in the Auckland Aces' squad for the 2018 Abu Dhabi T20 Trophy.

In June 2020, he was offered a contract by Auckland ahead of the 2020–21 domestic cricket season.

== See also ==
- List of Auckland representative cricketers
