= Tom Bruce (cricketer) =

New Zealand-Scottish cricketer

Personal information
- Full name: Tom Charles Bruce
- Born: 2 August 1991 (age 35); Te Kūiti, New Zealand
- Batting: Right-handed
- Bowling: Right-arm off break
- Role: Top-order batter, occasional wicket-keeper

International information
- National sides: New Zealand (2017–2020); Scotland (2025–2026)
- ODI debut (cap 87): 31 August 2025; Scotland v Canada
- Last ODI: 4 September 2025; Scotland v Namibia
- T20I debut (cap 70/66): 3 January 2017; New Zealand v Bangladesh
- Last T20I: 17 February 2026; Scotland v Nepal

Domestic team information
- Years: Team
- 2014/15–present: Central Districts
- 2018: Sussex
- 2024: Chattogram Challengers
- 2024: Lancashire

Career statistics
Competition	ODI	T20I	FC	LA
Matches	2	21	99	95
Runs scored	33	344	6,493	2,749
Batting average	33.00	18.10	46.04	33.52
100s/50s	0/0	0/2	12/35	3/21
Top score	22	59*	345	139
Balls bowled	–	–	1,264	204
Wickets	–	–	23	5
Bowling average	–	–	36.17	50.80
5 wickets in innings	–	–	0	0
10 wickets in match	–	–	0	0
Best bowling	–	–	2/17	3/4
Catches/stumpings	1/–	17/–	142/–	50/–
- Source: Cricinfo, 15 April 2026

Tom Charles Bruce (born 2 August 1991) is a New Zealand cricketer who has played Twenty20 Internationals (T20Is) for New Zealand and Scotland. He is also a first-class cricketer who plays for Central Districts.

== Early life and education ==
Bruce was born on 2 August 1991 in Te Kūiti, New Zealand. His father is of Scottish descent. He attended Wanganui Collegiate School.

== Domestic career ==
In June 2018, Bruce was awarded a contract with Central Districts for the 2018–19 season. In March 2019, he was named as the Burger King Super Smash Men's Player of the Year at the annual New Zealand Cricket awards.

In March 2022, in the 2021–22 Plunket Shield season, Bruce scored his maiden double century in first-class cricket, with 208 not out against Northern Districts.

In March 2025, during the 2024–25 Plunket Shield season, Bruce scored his maiden triple century in first-class cricket, with 345 from 401 deliveries.

In January 2024, Bruce signed with Lancashire for 2024 season.

== International career ==
=== New Zealand ===
In December 2016, he was named in New Zealand's T20I squad for their series against Bangladesh. On 3 January 2017 he made his T20I debut for New Zealand against Bangladesh.

=== Scotland ===
On 12 August 2025, Scotland announced that Bruce had committed to Scotland, qualifying through his Edinburgh-born father and was named in the squad for 2025 Canada Tri-Nation Series, formed part of 2024–2026 Cricket World Cup League 2 games against Canada and Namibia.
