= New Zealand A cricket team =

Second-tier national team

New Zealand 'A'

Personnel
- Test captain: Tom Bruce
- One Day captain: Tom Bruce
- T20I captain: Corey Anderson

Team information
- Founded: 1997

History
- First-class debut: England XI in 30 January 1997 at Victoria Park, Whanganui
- Official website: Official Website

The New Zealand A cricket team is a cricket team representing New Zealand, and is the second tier of international New Zealand cricket below the full New Zealand cricket team. The team played its first game, against an England XI, in 1996/97.

New Zealand A have played fewer games in their history than most other A teams, partly because of a three-year gap between 2000/01 and 2003/04 in which they played no matches at all.

== Season-by-season results summary ==
First-class matches played
Year	Opposition	Venue	W	L	D	NR
1997	England XI	New Zealand	1	—	—	—
1997	Sri Lankans	New Zealand	—	—	—	1
1998	Zimbabweans	New Zealand	1	—	—	—
1998	Pakistan A	New Zealand	1	—	—	—
1998	South Africans	New Zealand	—	—	1	—
1999	England Lions	New Zealand	—	—	1	—
1999	West Indians	New Zealand	—	—	1	—
1999	England Lions	New Zealand	—	1	—	—
2000	Lancashire	England	—	—	1	—
2000	West Indians	England	—	—	1	—
2000	Sussex	England	1	—	—	—
2000	First-Class Counties Select XI	England	—	—	1	—
2000	Hampshire	England	1	—	—	—
2000	MCC	England	—	1	—	—
2001	Pakistanis	New Zealand	1	—	—	—
2004	Sri Lanka A	New Zealand	3	—	—	—
2004	South Africa A	South Africa	—	1	2	—
2005	Sri Lanka A	Sri Lanka	1	—	2	—
2008	India A	India	1	1	—	—
2009	England Lions	New Zealand	—	—	2	—
2010	Zimbabwe A	Zimbabwe	2	—	1	—
2012	India A	New Zealand	—	—	2	—
2013	India A	India	—	—	2	—
2013	Sri Lanka A	Sri Lanka	—	1	—	—
2014	Kent	England	—	—	—	1
2014	Surrey	England	—	—	—	—
2017	India A	India	—	2	—	—
2018	Pakistan A	Dubai	–	–	2	–
2018	India A	New Zealand	—	—	3	—
