= Otago cricket team =

New Zealand cricket team

Otago

Personnel
- Captain: Luke Georgeson
- Coach: Josh Tasman-Jones

Team information
- Founded: 1864
- Home ground: University Oval
- Capacity: 3,500

History
- First-class debut: Canterbury in 1864 at Dunedin
- Plunket Shield wins: 13
- The Ford Trophy wins: 2
- Men's Super Smash wins: 2
- Official website: www.otagocricket.co.nz

The Otago cricket team are a New Zealand first-class cricket team which first played representative cricket in 1864. The team represent the Otago, Southland and North Otago regions of New Zealand's South Island. Their main governing board is the Otago Cricket Association which is one of six major associations that make up New Zealand Cricket.

They compete in the Plunket Shield first-class competition, The Ford Trophy one day competition, and in the Men's Super Smash Twenty20 competition. The team have used the nickname Otago Volts since the 1997–98 season, and in 2025–26 used the name Volts in the Super Smash.

Cricket was first played in Otago in 1849, the year after the province was settled by Europeans, and the Otago Cricket Association was founded in 1876. The Otago representative team played in the first match which is considered to have first-class status to have been played in New Zealand, a January 1864 fixture with Canterbury which was part of a four-team tournament which also included Southland and an English team led by George Parr which was touring Australia.

The modern Otago team play most of their home games at the University Oval in Dunedin, but occasionally play games at the Queenstown Events Centre, Queen's Park Ground in Invercargill and Molyneux Park in Alexandra. The team play first-class, List A and Twenty20 matches against other New Zealand provincial teams, although in the past have also played against touring teams.

The team's head-coach for the 2024–25 season, Ashley Noffke, left to take up a position as assistant coach with the Pakistan national team after the end of the season. Former New Zealand coach Gary Stead took over the role in a temporary facility over the winter period, before Josh Tasman-Jones was named as the team's coach in August. The 2024–25 captain was all-rounder Luke Georgeson.

== Honours ==
- Plunket Shield (13)

1924–25, 1932–33, 1947–48, 1950–51, 1952–53, 1957–58, 1969–70, 1971–72, 1974–75, 1976–77, 1978–79, 1985–86, 1987–88

- The Ford Trophy (2)

1987–88, 2007–08

- Men's Super Smash (2)

2008–09, 2012–13

== First-class records ==
Otago Volts batsmen at the Basin Reserve in December 2019

As of 28 October 2022

=== Team totals ===
- Highest total for – 651/9 declared v Wellington at University Oval, Dunedin, 2012/13
- Highest total against – 777 by Canterbury at Lancaster Park, Christchurch, 1996/97
- Lowest total for – 34 v Wellington at Carisbrook, Dunedin, 1956/57
- Lowest total against – 25 by Canterbury at Hagley Oval, Christchurch, 1866/67

=== Individual batting ===
- Highest score – 385, B Sutcliffe against Canterbury at Lanaster Park, Christchurch, 1952/53
- Most runs in season – 1,027 GM Turner, 1975/76
- Most runs in career – 6,589 CD Cumming, 2000/01–2011/12

=== Highest partnership for each wicket ===
- 1st – 373 B Sutcliffe and L Watt v Auckland at Auckland, 1950/51
- 2nd – 254 KJ Burns and KR Rutherford v Wellington at Oamaru, 1987/88
- 3rd – 306 SB Haig and NT Broom v Central Districts at Napier, 2009/10
- 4th – 239 NB Beard and NT Broom v Auckland at Hamilton, 2012/13
- 5th – 266 B Sutcliffe and WS Haig v Auckland at Dunedin, 1949/50
- 6th – 256 NF Kelly and MW Chu v Central Districts at Dunedin, 2021/22
- 7th – 190 NG Smith and MJG Rippon v Northern Districts at Dunedin, 2019/20
- 8th – 165* JN Crawford and AG Eckhold v Wellington at Wellington, 1914/15
- 9th – 208 WC McSkimming and BE Scott v Auckland at Auckland, 2004/05
- 10th – 184 RC Blunt and W Hawksworth v Canterbury at Christchurch, 1931/32

=== Bowling ===
- Best inning bowling – 9/50 AH Fisher v Queensland at Dunedin, 1896/97
- Best match bowling figures – 15/94 FH Cooke v Canterbury at Christchurch, 1882/83
- Most wickets in season – 54 SL Boock, 1978/79
- Most wickets in career – 399 SL Boock, 1973/74–1990/91

== Contracted players ==
Ahead of the 2025–26 season, 15 players were awarded contracts to play for Otago. In addition, Jacob Duffy and Glenn Phillips were both awarded New Zealand Cricket central contracts for the season. Other, non-contracted players may play for the team during the season.

As of 13 July 2025

No.	Name	Nationality	Birth date	Batting style	Bowling style	Notes
34	Matt Bacon	New Zealand	13 April 1993 (age 33)	Right-handed	Right-arm medium-fast	
33	Jack Boyle	New Zealand	24 March 1996 (age 30)	Right-handed	Right-arm offbreak	
12	Max Chu	New Zealand	21 March 2000 (age 26)	Right-handed	Left-arm fast	
	Mason Clarke	New Zealand	20 February 2007 (age 19)	Left-handed		
6	Jacob Cumming	New Zealand	14 December 2003 (age 22)	Left-handed	Right-arm medium	
3	Zac Cumming	New Zealand	4 July 2005 (age 21)	Right-handed	Right-arm leg-break	
32	Jacob Duffy	New Zealand	2 August 1994 (age 32)	Right-handed	Right-arm fast-medium	New Zealand central contract
94	Danru Ferns	South Africa	23 February 1994 (age 32)	Right-handed	Right-arm medium	
26	Luke Georgeson	New Zealand	14 April 1999 (age 27)	Left-handed	Right-arm medium-fast	Captain. Holds dual Irish/New Zealand citizenship
7	Jake Gibson	New Zealand	7 August 1997 (age 29)	Right-handed	Right-arm medium	
31	Andrew Hazeldine	England	13 July 1994 (age 32)	Left-handed	Left-arm fast	Holds dual British/New Zealand citizenship
2	Troy Johnson	New Zealand	1 October 1997 (age 29)	Right-handed	Right-arm offbreak	
36	Llew Johnson	New Zealand	1 February 2000 (age 26)	Right-handed	Right-arm leg-break	
17	Ben Lockrose	New Zealand	24 March 2000 (age 26)	Right-handed	Slow left-arm orthodox	
27	Jarrod McKay	New Zealand	8 June 2000 (age 26)	Right-handed	Right-arm medium-fast	
86	Thorn Parkes	New Zealand	10 August 2000 (age 26)	Left-handed	Right-arm leg break	
23	Glenn Phillips	New Zealand	6 December 1996 (age 29)	Right-handed	Right-arm off-break	New Zealand central contract
73	Jamal Todd	New Zealand	27 March 2004 (age 22)	Left-handed	Right-arm off-break	

== Grounds ==
University Oval is used in Dunedin, with occasional matches in Invercargill (Queen's Park) and at the Queenstown Events Centre. Many matches have been played at Molyneux Park in Alexandra in recent decades, particularly during the Christmas-New Year holiday season. The warm, dry summer climate of Central Otago can make for better cricketing conditions than the wetter coastal areas. Oamaru (Whitestone Centennial Park) has been used in the past but not recently.

== Notable former players ==
New Zealand

- Gren Alabaster
- Jack Alabaster
- Bruce Blair
- Stephen Boock
- Neil Broom
- Lance Cairns
- Bevan Congdon
- Craig Cumming
- Jacob Duffy
- Arthur Fisher
- Walter Hadlee
- Warren Lees
- Brendon McCullum
- Nathan McCullum
- Noel McGregor
- Alex Moir
- Jimmy Neesham
- Aaron Redmond
- Mark Richardson
- Hamish Rutherford
- Ken Rutherford
- Bert Sutcliffe
- Glenn Turner
- Neil Wagner

Australia

- Brett Lee

England

- Matthew Maynard
- Jonathan Trott
- Steven Finn

Pakistan

- Billy Ibadulla

Netherlands

- Ryan ten Doeschate

West Indies

- Jason Holder
