= 2024 Under-19 Cricket World Cup squads =

List of cricket squads

The 2024 Under-19 Cricket World Cup took place in the South Africa in January and February 2024. England were the first team to announced their squad.

== Afghanistan ==
Afghanistan announced 15-member squad on 10 January 2024, with Nasir Khan as captain.

- Naseer Khan (c)
- Numan Shah (vc)
- Zahid Afghan
- Bashir Ahmad
- Khalil Ahmad
- Faridoon Dawoodzai
- Hassan Eisakhil
- Allah Mohammad Ghazanfar
- Arab Gul
- Ali Ahmad Nasar
- Wafiullah Tarakhil
- Khalid Taniwal
- Jamshid Zadran
- Sohail Khan Zurmati
- Rahimullah Zurmati

== Australia ==
Australia announced 15-members squad on 11 December 2023 with Hugh Weibgen as a captain of team.

- Hugh Weibgen (c)
- Lachlan Aitken
- Charlie Anderson
- Harkirat Bajwa
- Mahli Beardman
- Tom Campbell
- Harry Dixon
- Ryan Hicks
- Sam Konstas
- Rafael MacMillan
- Aidan O’Connor
- Harjas Singh
- Tom Straker
- Callum Vidler
- Corey Wasley

== Bangladesh ==
Bangladesh named their 15 man squad on 1 January 2024 with Mahfuzur Rahman Rabby as captain and Ahrar Amin as his deputy.

- Mahfuzur Rahman Rabby (c)
- Ahrar Amin (vc)
- Ashiqur Rahaman Shibli
- Jishan Alam
- Chowdhury Md Rizwan
- Adil Bin Siddik
- Mohammad Ashrafuzzaman Boranno
- Ariful Islam
- Shihab James
- Parvez Rahman Jibon
- Rafi Uzzaman Rafi
- Rohanat Doullah Borson
- Iqbal Hossain Emon
- Wasi Siddiquee
- Maruf Mridha

== England ==
England's squad was announced on 7 December 2023, with Ben McKinney named as the captain of the team.

- Ben McKinney (c)
- Luc Benkenstein
- Farhan Ahmed
- Tazeem Ali
- Charlie Allison
- Charlie Barnard
- Jack Carney
- Jaydn Denly
- Eddie Jack
- Dominic Kelly
- Sebastian Morgan
- Haydon Mustard
- Hamza Shaikh
- Noah Thain
- Theo Wylie

== India ==
India's squad was announced on 12 December 2023, with Uday Saharan named as the captain of the team.

- Uday Saharan (c)
- Saumy Kumar Pandey (vc)
- Murugan Abhishek
- Sachin Dhas
- Dhanush Gowda
- Musheer Khan
- Arshin Kulkarni
- Raj Limbani
- Innesh Mahajan (wk)
- Priyanshu Moliya
- Rudra Mayur Patel
- Aravelly Avanish Rao (wk)
- Aaradhya Shukla
- Adarsh Singh
- Naman Tiwari

== Ireland ==
Ireland's squad was announced on 14 December 2023, with Philippe le Roux named as the captain of the team.

- Philippe le Roux (c)
- Macdara Cosgrave
- Harry Dyer
- Daniel Forkin
- Kian Hilton
- Ryan Hunter
- Finn Lutton
- Scott Macbeth
- Carson McCullough
- John McNally
- Jordan Neill
- Oliver Riley
- Gavin Roulston
- Matthew Weldon
- Reuben Wilson

== Namibia ==
Namibia named their 15-man squad on 8 December 2023.

- Alex Volschenk (c)
- Gerhard Janse Van Rensburg
- Ben Brassell
- Hanro Badenhorst
- Jack Brassell
- Junior Kariata
- Pd Blignaut
- Faf Du Plessis
- Hansie De Villiers
- Ryan Moffett
- Woutie Niehaus
- Nico Pieters
- Jw Visagie
- Henry Van Wyk
- Zacheo Van Vuuren

== Nepal ==
Nepal's squad was announced on 4 January 2024, with Dev Khanal named as the captain of the team.

- Dev Khanal (c)
- Subash Bhandari
- Deepak Bohara
- Dipak Bohara
- Tilak Raj Bhandari
- Aakash Chand
- Dipak Prasad Dumre
- Durgesh Gupta
- Gulshan Jha
- Arjun Kumal
- Bishal Bikram KC
- Dipesh Kandel
- Uttam Rangu Thapa Magar
- Bipin Rawal
- Aakash Tripathi

== New Zealand ==
The New Zealand squad was announced on 14 December 2023, with Oscar Jackson named as captain.

- Oscar Jackson (c)
- Mason Clarke
- Sam Clode (wk)
- Zac Cumming
- Robbie Foulkes
- Tom Jones
- James Nelson
- Snehith Reddy
- Matt Rowe
- Ewald Schreuder
- Lachlan Stackpole
- Oliver Tewatiya
- Alex Thompson (wk)
- Ryan Tsourgas
- Luke Watson

== Pakistan ==
The Pakistan squad was announced on 23 December 2023, with Saad Baig named as captain.

- Saad Baig (c, wk)
- Ali Asfand (vc)
- Ali Raza
- Ahmad Hassan
- Amir Hassan
- Arafat Minhas
- Azan Awais
- Haroon Arshad
- Khubaib Khalil
- Mohammad Zeeshan
- Naveed Ahmed Khan
- Shahzaib Khan
- Shamyl Hussain
- Muhammad Riazullah
- Ubaid Shah

== Scotland ==
The Scotland squad was announced on 18 December 2023, with Owen Gould named as captain.

- Owen Gould (c)
- Uzair Ahmad
- Harry Armstrong
- Logan Briggs
- Jamie Dunk
- Bahadar Esakhiel
- Ibrahim Faisal
- Rory Grant
- Adi Hegde
- Mackenzie Jones
- Farhan Khan
- Qasim Khan
- Nikhil Koteeswaran
- Ruaridh McIntyre
- Alec Price

== Sri Lanka ==
Sri Lanka announced their 15-member squad on 10 January 2024, with Sineth Jayawardena named as the captain.

- Sineth Jayawardena (c)
- Malsha Tharupathi (vc)
- Rusanda Gamage
- Vishen Halambage
- Dinura Kalupahana
- Hirun Kapurubandara
- Vishwa Lahiru
- Pulindu Perera
- Ruvishan Perera
- Duvindu Ranatunga
- Garuka Sanketh
- Ravishan De Silva
- Sharujan Shanmuganathan
- Vihas Thewmika
- Supun Waduge

== South Africa ==
South Africa named their 15-player squad for ICC U19 Men’s World Cup 2024 on 8 December 2023. David Teeger was named as a team captain but later he was replaced by Juan James.

- Juan James (c)
- Esosa Aihevba
- Martin Khumalo
- Kwena Maphaka
- Dewan Marais
- Riley Norton
- Nqobani Mokoena
- Romashan Pillay
- Sipho Potsane
- Lhuan-dre Pretorius
- Richard Seletswane
- David Teeger
- Oliver Whitehead
- Steve Stolk
- Ntando Zuma

== United States ==
United States announced their 15-member squad on 27 December 2023, with Rishi Ramesh named as captain.

- Rishi Ramesh (c)
- Utkarsh Srivastava (vc)
- Amogh Arepally
- Rayaan Baghani
- Aaryan Batra
- Khush Bhalala
- Prannav Chettipalayam
- Arya Garg
- Siddarth Kappa
- Bhavya Mehta
- Aarin Nadkarni
- Manav Nayak
- Parth Patel
- Ateendra Subramanian
- Aryaman Suri

== West Indies ==
West Indies announced their 15-member squad on 27 December 2023, with Stephan Pascal named as captain.

- Stephan Pascal (c)
- Nathan Sealy (vc)
- Jewel Andrew
- Mavendra Dindyal
- Joshua Dorne
- Nathan Edward
- Tarrique Edward
- Reon Edwards
- Deshawn James
- Jordan Johnson
- Devonie Joseph
- Raneico Smith
- Isai Thorne
- Steve Wedderburn
- Adrian Weir

== Zimbabwe ==
The Zimbabwe squad was announced on 17 December 2023, with Matthew Schonken named as captain

- Matthew Schonken (c)
- Panashe Taruvinga (vc)
- Nathaniel Hlabangana
- Ronak Patel
- Campbell MacMillan
- Ryan Kamwemba
- Brendon Sunguro
- Calton Takawira
- Anesu Kamuriwo
- Newman Nyamhuri
- Mashford Shungu
- Kohl Eksteen
- Panashe Gwatiringa
- Shaun Dzakatira
- Munashe Chimusoro
