= 2025–26 Plunket Shield season =

Cricket tournament

2025–26 Plunket Shield
- Dates: 18 November 2025 – 30 March 2026
- Administrator: New Zealand Cricket
- Cricket format: First-class
- Tournament format: Round-robin
- Champions: Canterbury (21st title)
- Participants: 6
- Matches: 24
- Most runs: Henry Nicholls (870) (Canterbury)
- Most wickets: Raymond Toole (35) (Central Districts)

The 2025–26 Plunket Shield was the 100th season of the Plunket Shield, a domestic first-class cricket competition that took place in New Zealand. The tournament started on 18 November 2025 and concluded on 30 March 2026. Canterbury was the winner, its 21st Plunket Shield win; Canterbury finished equal on 99 points with Otago, and equal on the first tie-breaker with four wins, and won the shield on the second tie-breaker of net runs per wicket.

== Points table ==
Pos	Team	Pld	W	L	D	Pts	NetRpW
1	Canterbury (C)	8	4	1	3	99	12.134
2	Otago	8	4	1	3	99	4.911
3	Central Districts	8	4	2	2	87	-0.484
4	Auckland	8	3	3	2	85	-0.872
5	Northern Districts	8	3	4	1	82	0.051
6	Wellington	8	0	7	1	42	-17.051

Source: ESPNcricinfo, NZC
Rules for classification: 1) points; 2) wins; 3) net average per wicket.
- Points system: 12 for a win, 6 for a tie, 0 for a draw or loss.
- Batting bonus points: 1 point each for reaching 200, 250, 300, and 350 runs within the first 110 overs of each team's first innings.
- Bowling bonus points: 1 point each for taking 3, 5, 7, and 9 wickets within the first 110 overs of each team's first innings.
  (C) Champion

== Fixtures ==
=== Round 1 ===
18–21 November 2025
Scorecard

Auckland	v	Central Districts
406 (101.3 overs); Lachlan Stackpole 148 (112); Josh Clarkson 4/63 (19.3 overs)		191 (57 overs); Brad Schmulian 46 (86); Jock McKenzie 5/35 (17 overs)
		154 (53.1 overs) (f/o); Brad Schmulian 62 (107); Rohit Gulati 5/46 (21.1 overs)

Auckland won by an innings and 61 runs
Fitzherbert Park, Palmerston North
Umpires: Kim Cotton and John Dempsey

- Auckland won the toss and elected to bat.
- Taylor Bettelheim (Central Districts) and Harrish Kannan (Auckland) both made their first-class debuts.
- Lachlan Stackpole (Auckland) scored his maiden century in first-class cricket.
- Rohit Gulati (Auckland) took his maiden five-wicket haul in first-class cricket.
- Points: Auckland 20, Central Districts 4

18–21 November 2025
Scorecard

Otago	v	Wellington
522/9d (120 overs); Jack Boyle 156 (254); Nick Greenwood 3/40 (11 overs)		224 (57.1 overs); Tim Robinson 87* (102); Danru Ferns 4/44 (12.1 overs)
96/3 (22 overs); Jacob Cumming 43* (69); James Hartshorn 2/39 (10 overs)		393 (94 overs) (f/o); Nick Kelly 150 (211); Matthew Bacon 3/53 (13 overs)

Otago won by 7 wickets
Basin Reserve, Wellington
Umpires: Cory Black and Peter Pasco

- Wellington won the toss and elected to field.
- Tom Jones (Otago) made his first-class debut.
- Jacob Cumming and Tom Jones (Otago) both scored their maiden centuries in first-class cricket.
- Points: Otago 20, Wellington 4

18–21 November 2025
Scorecard

Northern Districts	v	Canterbury
237 (77.5 overs); Bharat Popli 69 (124); Michael Rae 4/45 (18 overs)		248 (87.4 overs); Matt Boyle 70 (124); Joshua Harvey Brown 3/34 (13 overs)
380/8d (106 overs); Bharat Popli 116 (174); Angus McKenzie 3/72 (23 overs)		371/5 (93.1 overs); Matt Boyle 156* (251); Joshua Brown 3/61 (17 overs)

Canterbury won by 5 wickets
Rangiora Recreation Ground, Rangiora
Umpires: Shaun Haig and Kannan Jagannathan

- Canterbury won the toss and elected to field.
- Aryan Mann (Northern Districts) made his first-class debut.
- Points: Canterbury 16, Northern Districts 5 (Note: Canterbury were deducted a total of 1 points for maintaining a slow over-rate.)

=== Round 2 ===
26–29 November 2025
Scorecard

Auckland	v	Northern Districts
307 (99.1 overs); Ryan Harrison 54* (112); Kris Clarke 4/53 (22.1 overs)		152 (60.2 overs); Henry Cooper 43 (100); Rohit Gulati 6/51 (22 overs)
354/5d (91.4 overs); Dale Phillips 107 (9177); Tim Pringle 4/136 (30 overs)		429/6 (133 overs); Henry Cooper 206* (388); Rohit Gulati 4/124 (51 overs)

Match drawn
Bay Oval, Mount Maunganui
Umpires: Kannan Jagannathan and Craig Pryor

- Northern Districts won the toss and elected to field.
- James Naylor (Northern Districts) made his first-class debut.
- Jeet Raval (Northern Districts) scored his 10,000th run in first-class cricket.
- Rohit Gulati (Auckland) took his maiden ten-wicket haul in first-class cricket.
- Points: Auckland 7, Northern Districts 4

26–29 November 2025
Scorecard

Wellington	v	Central Districts
354/9d (87.3 overs); Tim Robinson 108 (129); Blair Tickner 4/68 (21.3 overs)		118/3d (39 overs); Dean Foxcroft 53* (91); Liam Dudding 2/11 (7 overs)
124/4d (22 overs); Jesse Tashkoff 31 (28); Ajaz Patel 2/48 (8 overs)		365/2 (83.1 overs); Brad Schmulian 167* (228); Jesse Tashkoff 1/46 (9.1 overs)

Central Districts won by 8 wickets
Basin Reserve, Wellington
Umpires: John Dempsey and Greg Pennell

- Wellington won the toss and elected to bat.
- Only 50 and 4 overs play was possible on day 1 and 2 respectively, due to rain.
- Points: Central Districts 16, Wellington 5

26–29 November 2025
Scorecard

Canterbury	v	Otago
501/7d (121.2 overs); Henry Nicholls 111 (157); Jarrod McKay 2/63 (19 overs)		342 (90.4 overs); Glenn Phillips 94 (128); Ish Sodhi 4/110 (22 overs)
223/4d (57.3 overs); Henry Nicholls 109* (119); Luke Georgeson 2/9 (7 overs)		214/6 (83.3 overs); Thorn Parkes 44 (90); Ish Sodhi 3/74 (27 overs)

Match drawn
University of Otago Oval, Dunedin
Umpires: Shaun Haig and Niel Louw

- Otago won the toss and elected to field.
- Ish Sodhi and Sean Davey (Canterbury) both scored their maiden centuries in first-class cricket.
- Points: Canterbury 7, Otago 6

=== Round 3 ===
5–8 December 2025
Scorecard

Auckland	v	Wellington
350/9d (89 overs); Cam Fletcher 79 (170); Liam Dudding 5/67 (15 overs)		249 (75.4 overs); Callum McLachlan 89* (160); Simon Keene 4/36 (17 overs)
384/9d (103.3 overs); Bevon Jacobs 125 (135); Nick Greenwood 2/61 (13 overs)		323 (100.4 overs); Tim Robinson 106 (144); Rohit Gulati 3/71 (32 overs)

Auckland won by 162 runs
Eden Park Outer Oval, Auckland
Umpires: Cory Black and Brent Bowden

- Auckland won the toss and elected to bat.
- Yahya Zeb (Wellington) made his first-class debut.
- Points: Auckland 20, Wellington 5

5–8 December 2025
Scorecard

Northern Districts	v	Otago
346 (106.2 overs); Bharat Popli 91 (156); Toby Hart 6/73 (21 overs)		289 (102.2 overs); Luke Georgeson 74 (203); Brett Hampton 3/49 (15.2 overs)
296/9d (80 overs); Joe Carter 119* (186); Luke Georgeson 2/20 (9 overs)		240 (84 overs); Max Chu 60 (77); Zak Gibson 4/42 (15 overs)

Northern Districts won by 113 runs
Seddon Park, Hamilton
Umpires: John Dempsey and Greg Pennell

- Otago won the toss and elected to field.
- Henry Cooper (Northern Districts) scored his 5,000th run in first-class cricket.
- Danru Ferns (Otago) took his 100th wicket in first-class cricket.
- Toby Hart (Otago) took his maiden five-wicket haul in first-class cricket.
- James Naylor replaced Kris Clarke as a substitute for Northern Districts during Otago's second innings.
- Points: Northern Districts 19, Otago 6

5–8 December 2025
Scorecard

Central Districts	v	Canterbury
239 (85.3 overs); Curtis Heaphy 119 (249); Michael Rae 3/65 (17 overs)		124 (49.2 overs); Chad Bowes 33 (61); Josh Clarkson 4/33 (13.2 overs)
330 (99.2 overs); Brad Schmulian 93 (175); Cole McConchie 3/45 (11 overs)		150 (81.3 overs); Jesse Frew 30 (171); Ajaz Patel 3/37 (29 overs)

Central Districts won by 295 runs
McLean Park, Napier
Umpires: Chris Brown and Kannan Jagannathan

- Central Districts won the toss and elected to bat.
- Ajaz Patel (Central Districts) took his 400th wickets in first-class cricket.
- Jesse Frew replaced Mitchell Hay as a substitute for Canterbury during Central Districts' second innings.
- Fraser Sheat replaced Michael Rae as a substitute for Canterbury during Central Districts' second innings.
- Points: Central Districts 17, Canterbury 4

=== Round 4 ===
13–16 December 2025
Scorecard

Wellington	v	Northern Districts
319 (100.4 overs); Nick Kelly 111 (228); Tim Pringle 4/38 (21.4 overs)		571/9d (157 overs); Jeet Raval 108 (217); Elliot Seddon 5/150 (47 overs)
224 (91.2 overs); Peter Younghusband 66 (190); Tim Pringle 4/45 (32.2 overs)

Northern Dis won by an innings and 28 runs
Cobham Oval, Whangārei
Umpires: Chris Brown and Brad Wilson

- Wellington won the toss and elected to bat.
- Elliot Seddon (Wellington) took maiden five-wicket haul on his first-class debut.
- Points: Northern Districts 19, Wellington 4

13–16 December 2025
Scorecard

Auckland	v	Canterbury
138 (48.1 overs); Simon Keene 52 (71); Fraser Sheat 3/14 (13 overs)		534/8d (119 overs); Henry Nicholls 226 (314); Ryan Harrison 3/91 (21 overs)
324 (107.3 overs); Simon Keene 152 (153); Sean Davey 4/41 (19.3 overs)

Canterbury won by an innings and 72 runs
Hagley Oval, Christchurch
Umpires: Kim Cotton and Niel Louw

- Canterbury won the toss and elected to field.
- Callum Cameron (Canterbury) made his first-class debut.
- Simon Keene (Auckland) scored his 1000th run in first-class cricket.
- Points: Canterbury 20, Auckland 2

13–16 December 2025
Scorecard

Otago	v	Central Districts
416/7d (116 overs); Max Chu 151 (245); Tyler Annand 3/85 (24 overs)		224 (61.5 overs); Dean Foxcroft 94 (120); Danru Ferns 4/57 (15 overs)
		351/8 (101 overs) (f/o); Dane Cleaver 93* (114); Danru Ferns 3/82 (23 overs)

Match drawn
University of Otago Oval, Dunedin
Umpires: Shaun Haig and Kannan Jagannathan

- Central Districts won the toss and elected to field.
- Only 58 and 36 overs play was possible on day 3 and 4 respectively, due to rain.
- Oscar Mabin (Central Districts) made his first-class debut.
- Jayden Lennox replaced Ajaz Patel as a substitute for Central Districts during their second innings.
- Points: Otago 8, Central Districts 3

=== Round 5 ===
28 February–3 March 2026
Scorecard

Auckland	v	Northern Districts
283 (59 overs); Sean Solia 79 (142); Zak Gibson 3/50 (16 overs)		288 (93.2 overs); Jeet Raval 62 (145); Ben Lister 3/32 (17.2 overs)
188 (81.5 overs); Simon Keene 67 (120); Kristian Clarke 3/16 (14.5 overs)		184/4 (35.4 overs); Henry Cooper 63 (89); Ben Lister 2/41 (10 overs)

Northern Districts won by 6 wickets
Eden Park Outer Oval, Auckland
Umpires: Billy Bowden and Brad Wilson

- Auckland won the toss and elected to bat.
- Points: Northern Districts 18, Auckland 6

28 February–3 March 2026
Scorecard

Wellington	v	Central Districts
401 (113.3 overs); Nick Greenwood 143 (206); Brad Schmulian 4/27 (12 overs)		296 (90.4 overs); Brad Schmulian 117 (209); Nathan Smith 4/61 (17 overs)
244/8d Nathan Smith 62* (153); Raymond Toole 3/60 (27 overs)

Match drawn
McLean Park, Napier
Umpires: Wayne Knights (NZ) and Chamara de Soysa (SL)

- Central Districts won the toss and elected to field.
- Nick Greenwood (Wellington) scored his maiden century and also scored his 1000th run in first-class cricket.
- Points: Wellington 8, Central Districts 5

28 February–3 March 2026
Scorecard

Otago	v	Canterbury
296 (102.5 overs); Jack Boyle 62 (190); Sean Davey 4/48 (23 overs)		227 (51.4 overs); Henry Nicholls 96* (116); Luke Georgeson 3/29 (11 overs)

Match drawn
Hagley Oval, Christchurch
Umpires: John Dempsey and Greg Pennell

- Canterbury won the toss and elected to field.
- Points: Otago 6, Canterbury 5

=== Round 6 ===
9–12 March 2026
Scorecard

Auckland	v	Otago
228 (71.1 overs); Sean Solia 60 (107); Thomas O'Connor 7/58 (18.1 overs)		343 (102 overs); Max Chu 104 (162); Ryan Harrison 3/54 (16 overs)
146 (47.4 overs); Simon Keene 60 (80); Thomas O'Connor 6/27 (12.4 overs)		35/1 (7.1 overs); Jacob Cumming 18* (17); Simon Keene 1/15 (4 overs)

Otago won by 9 wickets
Eden Park Outer Oval, Auckland
Umpires: Chris Brown and Damian Morrow

- Auckland won the toss and elected to bat.
- Thomas O'Connor (Otago) took his maiden five-wicket haul in first-class cricket.
- Points: Otago 19, Auckland 5

7–10 March 2026
Scorecard

Central Districts	v	Northern Districts
373 (104 overs); Dane Cleaver 109 (137); Scott Kuggeleijn 4/90 (25 overs)		82 (32.2 overs); Tim Pringle 36* (79); Brett Randell 7/25 (11 overs)
		264 (84 overs) (f/o); Kristian Clarke 103 (173); Raymond Toole 5/32 overs)

Central Districts won by an innings and 27 runs
McLean Park, Napier
Umpires: Cory Black (NZ) and Chamara de Soysa (SL)

- Northern Districts won the toss and elected to field.
- Cooper Rowell (Northern Districts) made his first-class debut.
- Dane Cleaver (Central Districts) scored his 10th century in first-class cricket.
- Brett Randell (Central Districts) took five wickets in five balls, becoming the first player to do so in first-class cricket.
- Kristian Clarke (Northern Districts) scored his maiden century in first-class cricket.
- Points: Central Districts 20, Northern Districts 4

9–12 March 2026
Scorecard

Canterbury	v	Wellington
336 (81.3 overs); Matt Boyle 97 (88); Muhammad Abbas 5/69 (16.3 overs)		208 (54.5 overs); Nick Greenwood 103 (133); Fraser Sheat 4/34 (12.5 overs)
297/3d (41.3 overs); Tom Latham 101* (111); Logan van Beek 1/30 (6 overs)		224 (53.4 overs); Tom Blundell 98 (118); Fraser Sheat 4/71 (18 overs)

Canterbury won by 201 runs
Basin Reserve, Wellington
Umpires: John Dempsey and Wayne Knights

- Wellington won the toss and elected to field.
- Only 3 overs of play were possible on day 1 due to rain.
- Muhammad Abbas (Wellington) took his maiden five-wicket haul in first-class cricket.
- Points: Canterbury 7, Wellington 5

=== Round 7 ===
18–21 March 2026
Scorecard

Wellington	v	Auckland
309 (74.4 overs); Tom Blundell 96 (128); Ryan Harrison 3/57 (15 overs)		414 (93.5 overs); Lachlan Stackpole 172* (179); Michael Snedden 5/56 (16.5 overs)
181 (53.5 overs); Michael Snedden 44* (124); Adithya Ashok 3/18 (9.5 overs)		77/2 (14.5 overs); Luke Watson 31 (34); James Hartshorn 1/19 (4 overs)

Auckland won by 8 wickets
Basin Reserve, Wellington
Umpires: Kannan Jagannathan and Brad Wilson

- Auckland won the toss and elected to field.
- Marco William Alpe, Luke Watson (Auckland) and Oscar Jackson (Wellington) all made their first-class debuts.
- Michael Snedden (Wellington) took his maiden five-wicket haul in first-class cricket.
- Points: Auckland 20, Wellington 7

18–21 March 2026
Scorecard

Canterbury	v	Central Districts
334 (87.2 overs); Mitchell Hay 85 (163); Raymond Toole 4/87 (18.2 overs)		221 (78.1 overs); Dane Cleaver 67 (97); Michael Rae 4/73 (20.1 overs)
325/9d (95.1 overs); Leo Carter 77 (107); Raymond Toole 5/82 (24.1 overs)		159 (47.3 overs); Dane Cleaver 78 (82); Fraser Sheat 4/43 (14 overs)

Canterbury won by 279 runs
Rangiora Recreation Ground, Rangiora
Umpires: Damian Morrow and Greg Pennell

- Central Districts won the toss and elected to field.
- Points: Canterbury 19, Central Districts 5

18–21 March 2026
Scorecard

Northern Districts	v	Otago
339 (85.3 overs); Joe Carter 84 (98); Thomas O'Connor 4/86 (20 overs)		258 (77.2 overs); Jack Boyle 85 (162); Zak Gibson 3/67 (15.2 overs)
271 (86.3 overs); Joe Carter 81 (171); Matthew Bacon 3/48 (17 overs)		353/6 (101.1 overs); Thomas O'Connor 84* (90); Scott Kuggeleijn 2/53 (14 overs)

Otago won by 4 wickets
University of Otago Oval, Dunedin
Umpires: John Dempsey and Neil Louw

- Otago won the toss and elected to field.
- Points: Otago 18, Northern Districts 7

=== Round 8 ===
27–30 March 2026
Scorecard

Auckland	v	Canterbury
280 (97 overs); Sean Solia 74 (187); Michael Rae 3/66 (24 overs)		591 (153.1 overs); Leo Carter 169* (250); Adithya Ashok 3/133 (37.1 overs)
337/6 (91 overs); Dale Phillips 131 (174); Matt Boyle 4/87 (23 overs)

Match drawn
Eden Park Outer Oval, Auckland
Umpires: Billy Bowden and Kannan Jagannathan

- Canterbury won the toss and elected to field.
- Fraser Sheat (Canterbury) played his 50th first-class cricket match and also took his 150th wicket in first-class cricket.
- Points: Auckland 5, Canterbury 8

27–30 March 2026
Scorecard

Central Districts	v	Northern Districts
235 (61.3 overs); Tom Bruce 103 (152); Scott Kuggeleijn 3/34 (12 overs)		279 (102.3 overs); Ben Pomare 73 (154); Josh Clarkson 4/30 (19 overs)
327 (99.2 overs); Dean Foxcroft 91 (155); Zak Gibson 4/60 (20.2 overs)		258 (69.5 overs); Robert O'Donnell 101 (134); Brad Schmulian 3/5 (3.5 overs)

Central Districts won by 25 runs
Seddon Park, Hamilton
Umpires: John Dempsey and Wayne Knights

- Northern Districts won the toss and elected to field.
- Snehith Reddy (Northern Districts) made his first-class debut.
- Points: Central Districts 17, Northern Districts 6

27–30 March 2026
Scorecard

Wellington	v	Otago
156 (37.2 overs); Nathan Smith 71 (64); Thomas O'Connor 4/45 (12 overs)		112 (35.1 overs); Matthew Bacon 32 (39); Nathan Smith 6/25 (15.1 overs)
300 (76.1 overs); Jesse Tashkoff 101 (136); Danru Ferns 4/58 (10.1 overs)		345/6 (91 overs); Luke Georgeson 103* (133); James Hartshorn 4/79 (21 overs)

Otago won by 4 wickets
University of Otago Oval, Dunedin
Umpires: Greg Pennell and

- Otago won the toss and elected to field.
- Amogh Paranjpe (Wellington) made his first-class debut.
- Points: Otago 16, Wellington 4
