= Tony Boyle (cricketer) =

New Zealand cricketer (born 1957)

Tony John Boyle (born 19 July 1957 in Lower Hutt) is a former New Zealand cricketer who played for Northern Districts in the Plunket Shield. He is not related to Justin Boyle and David Boyle.
