= Tony Boyle =

Tony Boyle may refer to:

- Tony Boyle (cricketer) (born 1957), New Zealand cricketer
- Tony Boyle (Gaelic footballer) (born 1970), Irish Gaelic footballer
- W. A. Boyle (1904–1985), known as Tough Tony, United Mine Workers of America president later convicted of murder

== See also ==
- Anthony Boyle (born 1994), actor from Northern Ireland
