= Jamal Todd =

New Zealand cricketer

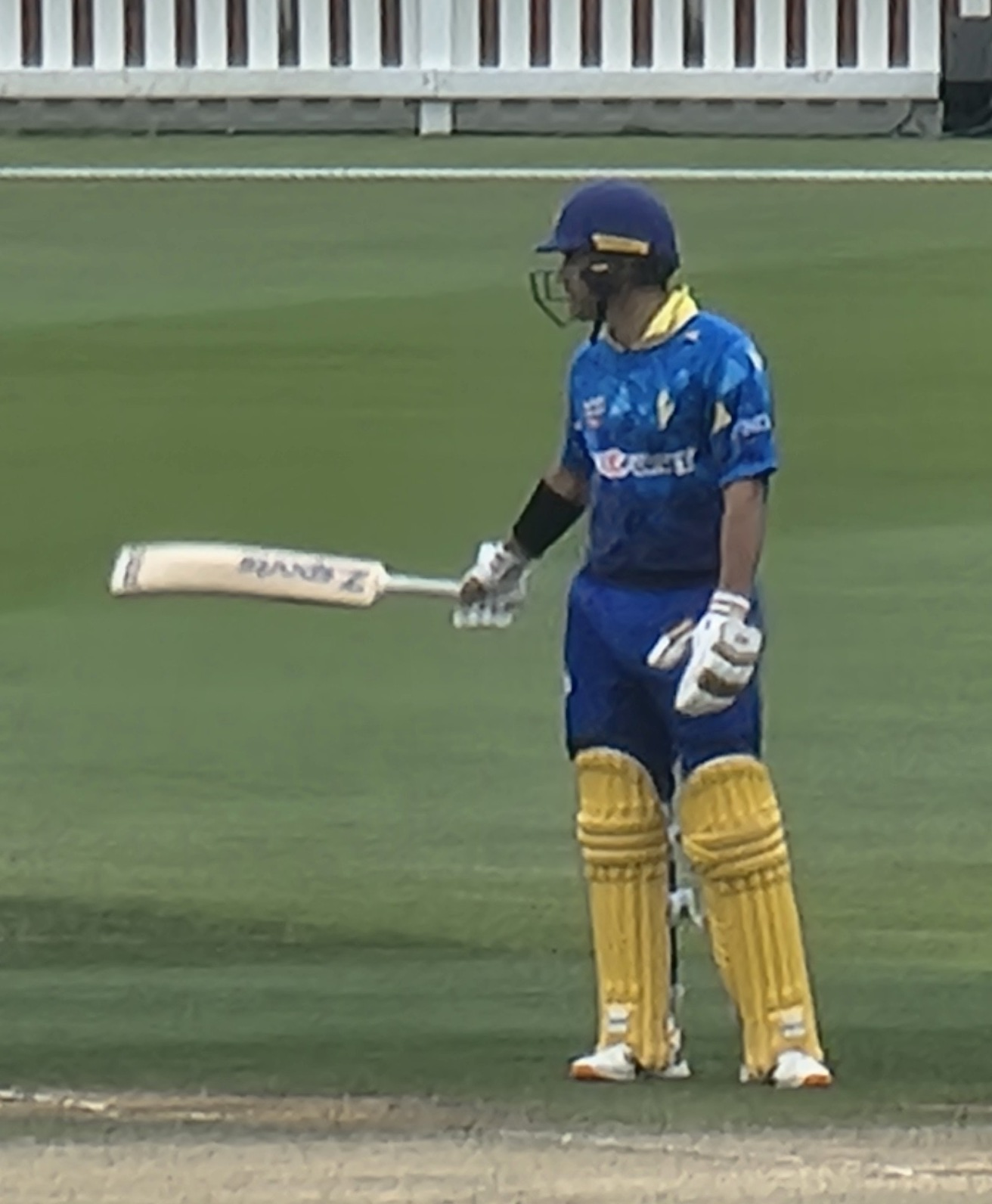
- Todd playing for the Otago Volts in 2026.

Personal information
- Full name: Jamal Tana Todd
- Born: 27 March 2004 (age 22); Auckland, New Zealand
- Batting: Left-handed
- Bowling: Right-arm off-spin
- Role: Batter

Domestic team information
- Years: Team
- 2023/24–: Otago (squad no. 73)

Career statistics
Competition	FC	LA	T20
Matches	11	12	21
Runs scored	520	187	377
Batting average	24.76	17.00	22.17
100s/50s	0/3	0/1	0/3
Top score	98	56	75
Balls bowled	48	–	–
Wickets	1	–	–
Bowling average	28.00	–	–
5 wickets in innings	0	–	–
10 wickets in match	0	–	–
Best bowling	1/25	–	–
Catches/stumpings	7/–	6/–	7/–
- Source: Cricinfo, 31 March 2026

Jamal Tana Todd (born 27 March 2004) is a New Zealand cricketer who has played for Otago since the 2023–24 season.

Born in Auckland on 27 March 2004, Todd was educated at Auckland Grammar School. He moved to Dunedin in 2022 to study sports management and Māori studies at the University of Otago. In his second first-class match, in the 2023–24 Plunket Shield, he scored 30 and 64 (the top score of the innings) for Otago against Canterbury.

In the provincial A T20 tournament in Taupō in November 2024, Todd scored two centuries for Otago A in two matches on the same day: 117 off 53 balls against Canterbury A, then 108 from 42 balls against Auckland A. He won the player of the match award when he scored 51 not out off 28 balls to take Otago to victory by eight wickets over Central Districts in the 2024–25 Super Smash.

Of Māori descent, Todd affiliates to Ngāti Whātua. In 2021, he was named in the Māori Secondary Schoolboys cricket team.

Todd's younger sister Anika plays for Auckland.
