= Justin Boyle =

New Zealand cricketer (born 1959)

Personal information
- Full name: Justin Gregory Boyle
- Born: 13 April 1959 (age 67); Christchurch, New Zealand
- Batting: Right-handed
- Bowling: Right-arm leg spin
- Relatives: David Boyle (brother); Jack Boyle (son); Matt Boyle (son)

Domestic team information
- Years: Team
- 1981/82–1983/84: Hutt Valley
- 1982/83–1985/86: Wellington
- 1986/87–1990/91: Canterbury

Career statistics
Competition	First-class	List A
Matches	35	17
Runs scored	1,475	299
Batting average	24.58	17.58
100s/50s	0/10	0/0
Top score	89	46
Catches/stumpings	11/–	2/–
- Source: CricketArchive, 31 January 2011

Justin Gregory Boyle (born 13 April 1959) is a New Zealand teacher and former cricketer who played for Wellington and Canterbury in the 1980s. He was later rector of St Kevin's College, Oamaru and St Bede's College, Christchurch, working at St Bede's for 21 years and becoming the college's longest serving rector.

== Early life and cricket ==
Born at Christchurch in 1959, Boyle was educated at St Thomas of Canterbury College in the city. After playing age-group cricket for Canterbury in the late-1970s, he appeared for Hutt Valley in the Hawke Cup between the 1981–82 season and 1983–84 and made his provincial debut for Wellington in January 1983. After 42 matches for the side over three seasons, he moved to play for Canterbury from 1986 to 1987, appearing in 10 matches for the provincial side. Primarily a batsman, he scored 1,475 first-class runs in 35 matches.

== Professional career ==
An English teacher, Boyle first taught in 1982 at Burnside High School before moving to Christchurch Boys' High School. Between 1996 and 2001, he was rector at St Kevin's College at Oamaru in Otago. He moved to become rector at St Bede's College, Christchurch, an all-boys Catholic high school, from 2002 to 2023. In 2005 Boyle was attacked by two youths. He retired as rector in 2023, leaving to take up a leadership role in the Society of Mary in New Zealand, the catholic organisation which operates St Bede's.

== Family ==
Boyle's brother, David Boyle, also played provincial cricket for Canterbury. Two of his sons Jack and Matt Boyle, have played first-class cricket.
