= Charlie Anderson (cricketer) =

Australian cricketer

Personal information
- Full name: Charlie F Anderson
- Born: 20 January 2005 (age 21)
- Batting: Right-handed
- Bowling: Right-arm medium
- Role: Bowler

Domestic team information
- Years: Team
- 2024/25–present: New South Wales

Career statistics
Competition	FC	LA
Matches	1	4
Runs scored	5	10
Batting average	5.00	–
100s/50s	0/0	0/0
Top score	5	10*
Balls bowled	108	180
Wickets	2	5
Bowling average	37.00	34.00
5 wickets in innings	0	0
10 wickets in match	0	0
Best bowling	2/74	3/37
Catches/stumpings	0/–	0/–
- Source: ESPNcricinfo, 3 June 2026

Charlie F Anderson (born 20 January 2005) is an Australian cricketer who plays for New South Wales. He plays as a right-arm medium bowler and bats right-handed.

== Career ==
Anderson was named as part of Australia's squad for the 2024 Under-19 Cricket World Cup. In April 2024, he was awarded a rookie contract with New South Wales. On 25 October 2024, he made his List A debut for New South Wales against Victoria, taking 3 wickets for 37. In November 2024, he was selected as part of the Prime Minister's XI team for a two-day tour match against India as part of their tour of Australia.
