= Tom Jones (New Zealand cricketer) =

New Zealand cricketer

Personal information
- Full name: Thomas Coney Jones
- Born: 6 September 2006 (age 20); Auckland, New Zealand
- Batting: Right-handed
- Bowling: Right-arm off-spin
- Role: Batter
- Relatives: Jeremy Coney (grandfather)

Domestic team information
- Years: Team
- 2025/26–: Otago

Career statistics
Competition	FC
Matches	8
Runs scored	359
Batting average	27.61
100s/50s	1/1
Top score	119
Catches/stumpings	8/–
- Source: Cricinfo, 27 March 2026

Thomas Coney Jones (born 6 September 2006) is a New Zealand cricketer who has played for Otago since the 2025–26 season. In November 2025 he made a century on his debut in first-class cricket.

Born in Auckland, the grandson of the New Zealand Test cricket captain Jeremy Coney, Jones was educated at Auckland Grammar School. He was awarded the Rope Cup in 2024, the award for "the best all-round young man in the School".

A right-handed batter, Jones represented New Zealand at the Under-19 World Cup in 2024 and again in 2026, when he captained the team. He made his first-class debut for Otago against Wellington in the opening match of the 2025–26 Plunket Shield season, and scored 119 off 124 balls in the first innings.
