= John G. Cleary =

New Zealand politician

John Gerald Cleary (19 October 1950 – 16 January 2014) was a New Zealand-Canadian professor of computer science, entrepreneur, politician and promoter of Transcendental Meditation.

== Academics ==
Cleary received his secondary education at St Thomas of Canterbury College, Christchurch. and attended Canterbury University, attaining a B.Sc. (Hons), MSc and PhD, before teaching at the Victoria University of Wellington, New Zealand and the University of Calgary in Alberta, Canada. After working in the private sector in Canada, he returned to New Zealand to the University of Waikato, an association he maintained for the rest of his life.

His most cited work is in the fields of data compression, machine learning, and logic programming. In particular, he independently discovered arithmetic coding and invented the prediction by partial matching (PPM) compression technique.

== Commercial ventures ==
From 1999 until his death in 2014, Cleary worked with several of his former students through a succession of companies on a variety of problems including document classification, named-entity recognition, sequence alignment, SNV calling from NGS data, and various problems in metagenomics.

Cleary worked from 1999 to 2001 with Webmind, Inc.

Cleary was a co-founder of ReelTwo (2001–2007) which developed high-speed genomic search software. ReelTwo was bought out by NetValue in 2007.

Cleary was Chief Technology Officer of Real Time Genomics (2013–2014) During his time at Real Time Genomics, he was instrumental in the development of Bayesian algorithms for the calling of genomic variants in the presence of a pedigree.

== Transcendental Meditation ==
Cleary was involved in the Transcendental Meditation movement, including standing for their party, the Natural Law Party of New Zealand, in the 1996 election for the Hamilton East electorate and was fourth on the party list. In the 1999 election standing in the same electorate, he won 96 votes, 0.30% of the total in the electorate; the party again won no seats.

== Death ==
Cleary died on 16 January 2014 following a short illness.
