= Sachin Dhas =

Indian cricketer (born 2005)

Personal information
- Full name: Sachin Sanjay Dhas
- Born: 3 February 2005 (age 21); Beed, Maharashtra, India
- Batting: Right-handed
- Role: Batting

Domestic team information
- Years: Team
- 2023/24–present: Maharashtra

Career statistics
Competition	FC
Matches	8
Runs scored	290
Batting average	24.16
100s/50s	0/1
Top score	98
Catches/stumpings	13/–
Medal record
Men's cricket
Representing India
ICC U19 Cricket World Cup
Runner-up	2024 South Africa
- Source: ESPNcricinfo, 25 January 2026

Sachin Sanjay Dhas (born 3 February 2005) is an Indian cricketer. He is a right handed batsman and right-arm off break bowler. Dhas represents Maharashtra in domestic cricket.

== Early life ==
Born to Surekha and Sanjay Dhas, he comes from Beed district in Maharashtra. He was named after Sachin Tendulkar. He showed promise in cricket for an early age and by the age of 16 years-old he was playing for Maharashtra U19.

== Career ==
He played for India U19 at the 2024 Under-19 Cricket World Cup where he helped them to reach the final, scoring 96 in the semi-final against South Africa U19 from 95 balls, having previously hit 116 against Nepal U19. He was subsequently named in the team-of-the tournament, having scored 303 runs in sevens matches with his strike rate of 116.53 the highest of the top ten run scorers.

He made his first class debut for Maharashtra against Services cricket team in the Ranji Trophy in February 2024.

== Personal life ==
His father works for the Maharashtra health department and his mother is an Assistant Police Inspector in the Maharashtra Police. Both parents played kabaddi.
