= 2024 Under-19 Cricket World Cup =

Cricket Tournament

2024 ICC Under-19 Men's Cricket World Cup
- Dates: 19 January – 11 February 2024
- Administrator: International Cricket Council (ICC)
- Cricket format: Limited-overs (50 overs)
- Tournament format(s): Group stage, Super 6s and Knockout stage
- Host: South Africa
- Champions: Australia (4th title)
- Runners-up: India
- Participants: 16
- Matches: 41
- Player of the series: (South Africa) Kwena Maphaka
- Most runs: (India) Uday Saharan (397)
- Most wickets: (South Africa) Kwena Maphaka (21)
- Official website: Official website

The 2024 ICC Under-19 Men's Cricket World Cup was an international limited-overs cricket tournament organized by the International Cricket Council (ICC), in South Africa from 19 January to 11 February 2024. It was the fifteenth edition of the Under-19 Cricket World Cup. India were the defending champions.

The tournament was originally scheduled to be held in Sri Lanka, but its hosting was pulled in November 2023 after Sri Lanka Cricket was suspended by the ICC. In the final, Australia defeated India by 79 runs to win their fourth Under-19 Cricket World Cup title.

== Qualification ==
The top eleven teams from the previous tournament qualified automatically, along with the five winners of regional qualification tournaments.

In November 2023, Sri Lanka was suspended by the ICC due to government interference in the country's cricket board; while Sri Lanka lost its rights to host the men's U-19 World Cup as a result, it did not affect the ability for Sri Lanka to play international matches. The suspension was lifted on 28 January 2024.

| Team | Qualification |
|---|---|
| South Africa | Host nation |
| Afghanistan | Automatic qualification |
| Australia | Automatic qualification |
| Bangladesh | Automatic qualification |
| England | Automatic qualification |
| India | Automatic qualification |
| Ireland | Automatic qualification |
| Pakistan | Automatic qualification |
| Sri Lanka | Automatic qualification |
| West Indies | Automatic qualification |
| Zimbabwe | Automatic qualification |
| Namibia | Regional qualification |
| Nepal | Regional qualification |
| New Zealand | Regional qualification |
| Scotland | Regional qualification |
| United States | Regional qualification |

== Match officials ==
On 10 January 2024, the ICC appointed the match officials for the tournament.

Match referees

- (India) Narayanan Kutty
- (Sri Lanka) Graeme Labrooy
- (England) Wayne Noon
- (South Africa) Shaid Wadvalla

Umpires

- (Pakistan) Faisal Afridi
- (India) K. N. Ananthapadmanabhan
- (Ireland) Roland Black
- (England) Mike Burns
- (Cricket West Indies) Nigel Duguid
- (Australia) Phillip Gillespie
- (Cricket West Indies) Patrick Gustard
- (South Africa) Bongani Jele
- (Australia) Donovan Koch
- (Zimbabwe) Forster Mutizwa
- (South Africa) Allahudien Paleker
- (Bangladesh) Masudur Rahman
- (Pakistan) Rashid Riaz
- (Zimbabwe) Langton Rusere
- (Afghanistan) Bismillah Jan Shinwari
- (Bangladesh) Gazi Sohel

== Squads ==
Each team selected a squad of fifteen players for the tournament, excluding reserves, with England being the first team to name their squad.

In January 2024, a week before the start of the tournament, Cricket South Africa removed David Teeger from the captaincy while retaining him in the World Cup squad. In a statement, CSA explained that "We have been advised that protests related to the war in Gaza can be anticipated at the venues for the tournament. We have also been advised that they are likely to focus on the position of the SA Under-19 captain, David Teeger, and that there is a risk that they could result in conflict or even violence, including between rival groups of protestors. CSA has a primary duty to safeguard the interests and safety of all those involved in the World Cup and must accordingly respect the expert advice of those responsible for the safety of participants and spectators. In all the circumstances, CSA has decided that David should be relieved of the captaincy for the tournament. This is in the best interests of all the players, the SA U19 team and David himself."

== Format ==
16 teams were divided into four groups, namely Group A, B, C, D. The top three teams from each group advanced to the Super Six stage. The fourth-placed teams in Group A and D faced each other while the fourth-placed teams in Group B and C faced each other in the placement stage.

In the super-six stage, the top three teams from Group A and D were combined in a group while the top three teams from Group B and C combined in another group. Each team carried forward the number of points, wins, and net run rate (NRR) they have earned against their fellow super-six qualifying teams.

Each team played two matches in the super-six stage against the opponent from the corresponding group that finished in a different group stage position (i.e. the A1 team played only D2 and D3 in the super-six. Similarly, A2 played only D1 and D3 and so forth).

The top two teams from each group in the super-six stage qualified for the semi-finals.

== Warm-up matches ==
Warm-up fixtures were announced on 11 December by ICC.

Warm-up matches

13 January 2024
10:00
Scorecard

| United States; 268/7 (50 overs) | v | Namibia; 78/1 (12.5 overs) |
| Siddarth Kappa 129* (149); Zacheo Van Vuuren 3/50 (7 overs) | | Gerhard Janse van Rensburg 39* (36); Rayaan Bhagani 1/14 (2 overs) |

No result
Tuks Cricket Oval, Pretoria
Umpires: Donovan Koch (Aus) and Bismillah Jan Shinwari (Afg)

- Namibia won the toss and elected to field.
- Rain during Namibia's innings prevented any further play.

13 January 2024
10:00
Scorecard

| Pakistan; 211/8 (41 overs) | v | South Africa; 38/2 (8.3 overs) |
| Ahmad Hassan 38 (58); Kwena Maphaka 3/18 (5 overs) | | Lhuan-dre Pretorius 15 (16); Amir Hassan 1/26 (4.3 overs) |

No result
St Stithians Main Oval, Johannesburg
Umpires: Phillip Gillespie (Aus) and Gazi Sohel (Ban)

- Pakistan won the toss and elected to bat.
- Rain during South Africas' innings prevented any further play.

13 January 2024
10:00
Scorecard

| India; 171 (40.2 overs) | v | Australia; 53/4 (16 overs) |
| Uday Saharan 74 (104); Charlie Anderson 4/20 (6 overs) | | Tom Campbell 11* (19); Saumy Pandey 1/6 (2 overs) |

No result
Tshwane University of Technology Oval, Pretoria
Umpires: Patrick Gustard (WI) and Nigel Duguid (WI)

- India won the toss and elected to bat.
- Rain during Australia's innings prevented any further play.

13 January 2024
10:00
Scorecard

| Scotland; 114 (44.4 overs) | v | Nepal; 99/3 (29.1 overs) |
| Uzair Ahmad 31 (48); Gulshan Jha 3/15 (6 overs) | | Arjun Kumal 33 (60); Ibrahim Faisal 1/17 (6.1 overs) |

Nepal won by 7 wickets (DLS method)
Braam Fisherville Oval, Johannesburg
Umpires: K. N. Ananthapadmanabhan (Ind) and Mike Burns (Eng)

- Scotland won the toss and elected to bat.
- Nepal were set a revised target of 98 runs from 40 overs due to rain.

14 January 2024
10:00
Scorecard

| Ireland; 217/9 (50 overs) | v | Zimbabwe; 167/3 (38 overs) |
| Harry Dyer 44* (58); Matthew Schonken 3/36 (9 overs) | | Ryan Kamwemba 52 (73); Reuben Wilson 2/16 (7 overs) |

Zimbabwe won by 27 runs (DLS method)
Tuks Cricket Oval, Pretoria
Umpires: Faisal Afridi (Pak) and Rashid Riaz (Pak)

- Zimbabwe won the toss and elected to field.
- Zimbabwe were 27 runs ahead of the revised target of 141 runs from 38 overs.

14 January 2024
10:00
Scorecard

| Afghanistan; 238 (47.2 overs) | v | England; 171 (39.2 overs) |
| Numan Shah 65 (54); Tazeem Chaudry Ali 3/43 (8 overs) | | Ben McKinney 40 (31); AM Ghazanfar 5/30 (9.2 overs) |

Afghanistan won by 67 runs
St Stithians Main Oval, Johannesburg
Umpires: Roly Black (Ire) and Allahudien Paleker (SA)

- England won the toss and elected to field.

14 January 2024
10:00
Scorecard

| Sri Lanka; 239/9 (49 overs) | v | Bangladesh; 119/9 (36.2 overs) |
| Pulindu Perera 50 (64); Wasi Siddique 2/26 (6 overs) | | Jishan Alam 26 (27); Vishen Halambage 3/28 (6.1 overs) |

Sri Lanka won by 112 runs (DLS method)
Tshwane University of Technology Oval, Pretoria
Umpires: Bongani Jele (SA) and Langton Rusere (Zim)

- Sri Lanka won the toss and elected to bat.
- Bangladesh were set a revised target of 232 runs from 36.2 overs.

14 January 2024
10:00
Scorecard

| New Zealand; 131 (39.2 overs) | v | West Indies; 132/4 (24.5 overs) |
| Tom Jones 24 (68); Nathan Sealy 4/21 (9 overs) | | Joshua Dorne 45* (66); Oscar Jackson 2/14 (3 overs) |

West Indies won by 6 wickets
Braam Fisherville Oval, Johannesburg
Umpires: Forster Mutizwa (Zim) and Masudur Rahman (Ban)

- West Indies won the toss and elected to field.

16 January 2024
10:00
Scorecard

| Ireland; 22/0 (5.2 overs) | v | Namibia |
| Ryan Hunter 12* (14) |

No result
Tuks Cricket Oval, Pretoria
Umpires: Phillip Gillespie (Aus) and Donovan Koch (Aus)

- Ireland won the toss and elected to bat.
- Rain during Ireland's innings prevented any further play.

16 January 2024
10:00
Scorecard

| West Indies; 33/1 (8.3 overs) | v | Nepal |
| Joshua Dorne 15* (20); Gulsan Jha 1/13 (4 overs) |

No result
St Stithians Main Oval, Johannesburg
Umpires: Roly Black (Ire) and Bismillah Jan Shinwari (Afg)

- Nepal won the toss and elected to field.
- Rain during West Indies' innings prevented any further play.

16 January 2024
10:00
Scorecard

| Zimbabwe; 136/9 (31 overs) | v | United States; 124 (30.1 overs) |
| Matthew Schonken 29 (34); Arya Garg 3/11 (5 overs) | | Siddharth Kappa 22 (19); Ryan Simbi 3/16 (6 overs) |

Zimbabwe won by 12 runs (DLS method)
Tshwane University of Technology Oval, Pretoria
Umpires: Mike Burns (Eng) and Bongani Jele (SA)

- United States won the toss and elected to field.
- The match was reduced to 31 overs per side due to rain.

16 January 2024
10:00
Scorecard

| South Africa; 125/7 (31 overs) | v | Afghanistan |
| David Teeger 38* (81); Khalil Ahmed 3/22 (5 overs) |

No result
Braam Fisherville Oval, Johannesburg
Umpires: Patrick Gustard (WI) and Langton Rusere (Zim)

- South Africa won the toss and elected to bat.
- Rain during South Africas' innings prevented any further play.

17 January 2024
10:00
Scorecard

| Sri Lanka; 208/9 (50 overs) | v | India; 209/3 (41.2 overs) |
| Dinura Kalupahana 67 (108); Musheer Khan 3/34 (9 overs) | | Musheer Khan 51* (52); Sineth Jayawardena 1/19 (4 overs) |

India won by 7 wickets
Tuks Cricket Oval, Pretoria
Umpires: Gazi Sohel (Ban) Rashid Riaz (Pak)

- Sri Lanka won the toss and elected to bat.

17 January 2024
10:00
Scorecard

| New Zealand; 306/8 (49 overs) | v | Scotland; 176 (47.2 overs) |
| Oscar Jackson 112* (97); Logan Briggs 2/49 (10 overs) | | Uzair Ahmad 26 (35); Mason Clarke 2/20 (7 overs) |

New Zealand won by 130 runs
St Stithians Main Oval, Johannesburg
Umpires: Allahudien Paleker (SA) Faisal Afridi (Pak)

- Scotland won the toss and elected to field.

17 January 2024
10:00
Scorecard

| Australia; 165 (37.1 overs) | v | Bangladesh; 166/5 (32.1 overs) |
| Harjas Singh 46 (60); Rohanat Doullah Borson 4/21 (5 overs) | | Chowdhury Md Rizwan 53* (59); Callum Vidler 2/24 (4 overs) |

Bangladesh won by 5 wickets
Tshwane University of Technology Oval, Pretoria
Umpires: Masudur Rahman (Ban) Nigel Duguid (WI)

- Australia won the toss and elected to bat.

17 January 2024
10:00
Scorecard

| England; 183/6 (34 overs) | v | Pakistan; 172/7 (33.3 overs) |
| Hamza Shaikh 62 (77); Naveen Ahmed Khan 2/8 (3 overs) | | Ahmed Hussain 44* (56); Dominic Kelly 4/28 (7 overs) |

England won by 9 runs (DLS method)
Braam Fisherville Oval, Johannesburg
Umpires: K. N. Ananthapadmanabhan (Ind) Langton Rusere (Zim)

- Pakistan won the toss and elected to field.
- The match was reduced to 34 overs per side due to rain

== Group stage ==
=== Group A ===
==== Points table ====
| Pos | Team | Pld | W | L | NR | Pts | NRR | Qualification |
|---|---|---|---|---|---|---|---|---|
| 1 | India | 3 | 3 | 0 | 0 | 6 | 3.240 | Advanced to the Super 6 |
| 2 | Bangladesh | 3 | 2 | 1 | 0 | 4 | 0.374 | Advanced to the Super 6 |
| 3 | Ireland | 3 | 1 | 2 | 0 | 2 | −0.778 | Advanced to the Super 6 |
| 4 | United States | 3 | 0 | 3 | 0 | 0 | −3.244 | Advanced to the play-offs |

Source: ESPNCricinfo

==== Fixtures ====
19 January 2024
10:00
Scorecard

| United States; 105 (40.2 overs) | v | Ireland; 109/3 (22.5 overs) |
| Khush Bhalala 22* (38); Oliver Riley 3/21 (8 overs) | | Ryan Hunter 50* (63); Arya Garg 2/31 (5 overs) |

Ireland won by 7 wickets
Mangaung Oval, Bloemfontein
Umpires: Allahudien Paleker (SA) and Langton Rusere (Zim)
Player of the match: Oliver Riley (Ire)

- Ireland won the toss and elected to field.

20 January 2024
10:00
Scorecard

| India; 251/7 (50 overs) | v | Bangladesh; 167 (45.5 overs) |
| Adarsh Singh 76 (96); Maruf Mridha 5/43 (8 overs) | | Mohammad Shihab James 54 (77); Saumy Pandey 4/24 (9.5 overs) |

India won by 84 runs
Mangaung Oval, Bloemfontein
Umpires: Nigel Duguid (WI) and Donovan Koch (Aus)
Player of the match: Adarsh Singh (Ind)

- Bangladesh won the toss and elected bat.

22 January 2024
10:00
Scorecard

| Ireland; 235/8 (50 overs) | v | Bangladesh; 239/4 (46.5 overs) |
| Kian Hilton 90 (112); Maruf Mridha 2/45 (8 overs) | | Mohammad Shihab James 55* (54); Scott MacBeth 2/41 (10 overs) |

Bangladesh won by 6 wickets
Mangaung Oval, Bloemfontein
Umpires: Allahudien Paleker (SA) and Nigel Duguid (WI)
Player of the match: Mohammad Shihab James (Ban)

- Bangladesh won the toss and elected field.

25 January 2024
10:00
Scorecard

| India; 301/7 (50 overs) | v | Ireland; 100 (29.4 overs) |
| Musheer Khan 118 (106); Oliver Riley 3/55 (10 overs) | | Daniel Forkin 27* (40); Naman Tiwari 4/53 (10 overs) |

India won by 201 runs
Mangaung Oval, Bloemfontein
Umpires: Nigel Duguid (WI) and Langton Rusere (Zim)
Player of the match: Musheer Khan (Ind)

- Ireland won the toss and elected field.

26 January 2024
10:00
Scorecard

| Bangladesh; 291/7 (50 overs) | v | United States; 170 (47.1 overs) |
| Ariful Islam 103 (103); Arya Garg 3/68 (10 overs) | | Prannav Chettipalayam 57 (90); Mahfuzur Rahman Rabby 4/31 (10 overs) |

Bangladesh won by 121 runs
Mangaung Oval, Bloemfontein
Umpires: Donovan Koch (Aus) and Allahudien Paleker (SA)
Player of the match: Ariful Islam (Ban)

- United States won the toss and elected to field.

28 January 2024
10:00
Scorecard

| India; 326/5 (50 overs) | v | United States; 125/8 (50 overs) |
| Arshin Kulkarni 108 (118); Ateendra Subramanian 2/45 (10 overs) | | Utkarsh Srivastava 40 (73); Naman Tiwari 4/20 (9 overs) |

India won by 201 runs
Mangaung Oval, Bloemfontein
Umpires: Donovan Koch (Aus) and Langton Rusere (Zim)
Player of the match: Arshin Kulkarni (Ind)

- United States won the toss and elected to field.

=== Group B ===
==== Points table ====
| Pos | Team | Pld | W | L | NR | Pts | NRR | Qualification |
|---|---|---|---|---|---|---|---|---|
| 1 | South Africa | 3 | 2 | 1 | 0 | 4 | 1.110 | Advanced to the Super 6 |
| 2 | England | 3 | 2 | 1 | 0 | 4 | 0.895 | Advanced to the Super 6 |
| 3 | West Indies | 3 | 2 | 1 | 0 | 4 | 0.653 | Advanced to the Super 6 |
| 4 | Scotland | 3 | 0 | 3 | 0 | 0 | −3.104 | Advanced to the play-offs |

Source: ESPNCricinfo

==== Fixtures ====
19 January 2024
10:00
Scorecard

| South Africa; 285/9 (50 overs) | v | West Indies; 254 (40.1 overs) |
| Dewan Marais 65 (38); Nathan Sealy 3/34 (10 overs) | | Jewel Andrew 130 (96); Kwena Maphaka 5/38 (9.1 overs) |

South Africa won by 31 runs
JB Marks Oval, Potchefstroom
Umpires: Roland Black (Ire) and Gazi Sohel (Ban)
Player of the match: Kwena Maphaka (SA)

- West Indies won the toss and elected to field.

20 January 2024
10:00
Scorecard

| Scotland; 174 (49.2 overs) | v | England; 178/3 (26.2 overs) |
| Owen Gould 48 (61); Farhan Ahmed 3/22 (10 overs) | | Ben McKinney 88 (68); Ibrahim Faisal 2/30 (5 overs) |

England won by 7 wickets
JB Marks Oval, Potchefstroom
Umpires: Rashid Riaz (Pak) and Bismillah Jan Shinwari (Afg)
Player of the match: Ben McKinney (Eng)

- England won the toss and elected to field.

23 January 2024
10:00
Scorecard

| South Africa; 230 (49.2 overs) | v | England; 137/2 (28.3 overs) |
| Steve Stolk 64 (55); Tazeem Ali 3/26 (10 overs) | | Noah Thain 63* (82); Tristan Luus 1/19 (5.3 overs) |

England won by 36 runs (DLS method)
JB Marks Oval, Potchefstroom
Umpires: Roland Black (Ire) and Bismillah Jan Shinwari (Afg)
Player of the match: Eddie Jack (Eng)

- England won the toss and elected to field.
- No further play was possible due to rain.

24 January 2024
10:00
Scorecard

| Scotland; 205/9 (50 overs) | v | West Indies; 206/5 (35.1 overs) |
| Jamie Dunk 57 (87); Isai Thorne 4/46 (9 overs) | | Jewel Andrew 64* (60); Adi Hegde 1/21 (7 overs) |

West Indies won by 5 wickets
JB Marks Oval, Potchefstroom
Umpires: Rashid Riaz (Pak) and Gazi Sohel (Ban)
Player of the match: Jewel Andrew (WI)

- West Indies won the toss and elected to field.

26 January 2024
10:00
Scorecard

| England; 192 (46.3 overs) | v | West Indies; 196/8 (41 overs) |
| Hamza Shaikh 54 (83); Nathan Edward 3/28 (6.3 overs) | | Stephan Pascal 58 (84); Farhan Ahmed 2/33 (10 overs) |

West Indies won by 2 wickets
JB Marks Oval, Potchefstroom
Umpires: Roland Black (Ire) and Rashid Riaz (Pak)
Player of the match: Nathan Edward (WI)

- West Indies won the toss and elected to field.

27 January 2024
10:00
Scorecard

| Scotland; 269/9 (50 overs) | v | South Africa; 273/3 (27 overs) |
| Owen Gould 97 (89); Riley Norton 3/48 (9 overs) | | Steve Stolk 86 (37); Nikhil Koteeswaran 2/52 (5 overs) |

South Africa won by 7 wickets
JB Marks Oval, Potchefstroom
Umpires: Bismillah Jan Shinwari (Afg) and Gazi Sohel (Ban)
Player of the match: Steve Stolk (SA)

- South Africa won the toss and elected to field.

=== Group C ===
==== Points table ====
| Pos | Team | Pld | W | L | NR | Pts | NRR | Qualification |
|---|---|---|---|---|---|---|---|---|
| 1 | Australia | 3 | 3 | 0 | 0 | 6 | 2.606 | Advanced to the Super 6 |
| 2 | Sri Lanka | 3 | 2 | 1 | 0 | 4 | 0.898 | Advanced to the Super 6 |
| 3 | Zimbabwe | 3 | 1 | 2 | 0 | 2 | −1.816 | Advanced to the Super 6 |
| 4 | Namibia | 3 | 0 | 3 | 0 | 0 | −1.607 | Advanced to the play-offs |

Source: ESPNCricinfo

==== Fixtures ====
21 January 2024
10:00
Scorecard

| Sri Lanka; 204 (48.3 overs) | v | Zimbabwe; 89 (21.1 overs) |
| Dinura Kalupahana 60 (55); Kohl Eksteen 3/40 (10 overs) | | Matthew Schonken 27 (19); Malsha Tharupathi 4/17 (4 overs) |

Sri Lanka won by 39 runs (DLS method)
Diamond Oval, Kimberley
Umpires: Mike Burns (Eng) and Patrick Gustard (WI)
Player of the match: Dinura Kalupahana (SL)

- Zimbabwe won the toss and elected to field.
- Zimbabwe were set a revised target of 129 runs from 22 overs due to rain.

22 January 2024
10:00
Scorecard

| Namibia; 91 (33.1 overs) | v | Australia; 95/6 (19.5 overs) |
| Zacheo van Vuuren 29 (47); Callum Vidler 4/17 (8.1 overs) | | Hugh Weibgen 39* (43); Jack Brassell 3/28 (8 overs) |

Australia won by 4 wickets
Diamond Oval, Kimberley
Umpires: Faisal Afridi (Pak) and Masudur Rahman (Ban)
Player of the match: Callum Vidler (Aus)

- Australia won the toss and elected to field.

24 January 2024
10:00
Scorecard

| Sri Lanka; 133 (37.5 overs) | v | Namibia; 56 (27 overs) |
| Supun Waduge 56* (79); Zacheo van Vuuren 4/23 (8 overs) | | Peter-Daniel Blignaut 18* (15); Ruvishan Perera 3/3 (5 overs) |

Sri Lanka won by 77 runs
Diamond Oval, Kimberley
Umpires: Mike Burns (Eng) and Masudur Rahman (Ban)
Player of the match: Supun Waduge (SL)

- Namibia won the toss and elected to field.

25 January 2024
10:00
Scorecard

| Australia; 296/7 (50 overs) | v | Zimbabwe; 71 (23.2 overs) |
| Harry Dixon 89 (108); Brandon Sunguro 2/48 (10 overs) | | Ronak Patel 36 (48); Harkirat Bajwa 4/15 (7.2 overs) |

Australia won by 225 runs
Diamond Oval, Kimberley
Umpires: Faisal Afridi (Pak) and Patrick Gustard (WI)
Player of the match: Harry Dixon (Aus)

- Australia won the toss and elected to bat.

27 January 2024
10:00
Scorecard

| Namibia; 146/8 (50 overs) | v | Zimbabwe; 147/2 (35.3 overs) |
| Hanro Badenhorst 39* (76); Newman Nyamhuri 4/21 (10 overs) | | Panashe Taruvinga 59* (115); Gerhard Janse van Rensburg 1/30 (9 overs) |

Zimbabwe won by 8 wickets
Diamond Oval, Kimberley
Umpires: Mike Burns (Eng) and Faisal Afridi (Pak)
Player of the match: Newman Nyamhuri (Zim)

- Zimbabwe won the toss and elected to field.

28 January 2024
10:00
Scorecard

| Sri Lanka; 208 (49.5 overs) | v | Australia; 211/4 (48.5 overs) |
| Dinura Kalupahana 64 (78); Callum Vidler 3/28 (9 overs) | | Ryan Hicks 77* (104); Vishwa Lahiru 2/24 (10 overs) |

Australia won by 6 wickets
Diamond Oval, Kimberley
Umpires: Patrick Gustard (WI) and Masudur Rahman (Ban)
Player of the match: Ryan Hicks (Aus)

- Sri Lanka won the toss and elected to bat.

=== Group D ===
==== Points table ====
| Pos | Team | Pld | W | L | NR | Pts | NRR | Qualification |
|---|---|---|---|---|---|---|---|---|
| 1 | Pakistan | 3 | 3 | 0 | 0 | 6 | 2.180 | Advanced to the Super 6 |
| 2 | New Zealand | 3 | 2 | 1 | 0 | 4 | 0.387 | Advanced to the Super 6 |
| 3 | Nepal | 3 | 1 | 2 | 0 | 2 | −0.351 | Advanced to the Super 6 |
| 4 | Afghanistan | 3 | 0 | 3 | 0 | 0 | −2.008 | Advanced to the play-offs |

Source: ESPNCricinfo

==== Fixtures ====
20 January 2024
10:00
Scorecard

| Pakistan; 284/9 (50 overs) | v | Afghanistan; 103 (26.5 overs) |
| Shahzaib Khan 106 (126); Khalil Ahmed 4/51 (10 overs) | | Numan Shah 26 (31); Ubaid Shah 4/26 (7 overs) |

Pakistan won by 181 runs
Buffalo Park, East London
Umpires: K. N. Ananthapadmanabhan (Ind) and Bongani Jele (SA)
Player of the match: Shahzaib Khan (Pak)

- Pakistan won the toss and elected to bat.

21 January 2024
10:00
Scorecard

| New Zealand; 302/8 (50 overs) | v | Nepal; 238/9 (50 overs) |
| Snehith Reddy 147* (125); Subash Bhandari 3/60 (10 overs) | | Arjun Kumal 90 (104); Mason Clarke 3/25 (8 overs) |

New Zealand won by 64 runs
Buffalo Park, East London
Umpires: Phillip Gillespie (Aus) and Forster Mutizwa (Zim)
Player of the match: Snehith Reddy (NZ)

- New Zealand won the toss and elected to bat.

23 January 2024
10:00
Scorecard

| Afghanistan; 91 (21.3 overs) | v | New Zealand; 92/9 (28.2 overs) |
| Jamshid Zadran 22 (32); Matt Rowe 5/21 (8 overs) | | Oscar Jackson 26 (45); AM Ghazanfar 3/29 (10 overs) |

New Zealand won by 1 wicket
Buffalo Park, East London
Umpires: K. N. Ananthapadmanabhan (Ind) and Forster Mutizwa (Zim)
Player of the match: Matt Rowe (NZ)

- Afghanistan won the toss and elected to bat.

24 January 2024
10:00
Scorecard

| Nepal; 197 (50 overs) | v | Pakistan; 201/5 (47.4 overs) |
| Bipin Rawal 39 (68); Arafat Minhas 3/23 (10 overs) | | Azan Awais 63* (82); Aakash Chand 3/34 (9 overs) |

Pakistan won by 5 wickets
Buffalo Park, East London
Umpires: Phillip Gillespie (Aus) and Bongani Jele (SA)
Player of the match: Azan Awais (Pak)

- Nepal won the toss and elected to bat.

26 January 2024
10:00
Scorecard

| Afghanistan; 145 (40.1 overs) | v | Nepal; 149/9 (44.4 overs) |
| AM Ghazanfar 37 (21); Aakash Chand 5/34 (8 overs) | | Dev Khanal 58 (89); Faridoon Dawoodzai 3/21 (4.4 overs) |

Nepal won by 1 wicket
Buffalo Park, East London
Umpires: Bongani Jele (SA) and Forster Mutizwa (Zim)
Player of the match: Aakash Chand (Nep)

- Afghanistan won the toss and elected to bat.

27 January 2024
10:00
Scorecard

| New Zealand; 140 (38 overs) | v | Pakistan; 144/0 (25.2 overs) |
| Lachlan Stackpole 42 (37); Arafat Minhas 3/6 (5 overs) | | Shahzaib Khan 80* (86) |

Pakistan won by 10 wickets
Buffalo Park, East London
Umpires: K. N. Ananthapadmanabhan (Ind) and Phillip Gillespie (Aus)
Player of the match: Shahzaib Khan (Pak)

- New Zealand won the toss and elected to bat.

== 13th to 16th Place play-offs ==
31 January 2024
10:00
Scorecard

| United States; 148 (48.2 overs) | v | Afghanistan; 151/7 (49.3 overs) |
| Prannav Chettipalayam 33 (50); AM Ghazanfar 3/30 (10 overs) | | Naseer Khan Maroofkhil 39 (107); Ateendra Subramanian 3/20 (10 overs) |

Afghanistan won by 3 wickets
Willowmoore Park, Benoni
Umpires: Patrick Gustard (WI) and Bongani Jele (SA)
Player of the match: Rahimullah Zurmati (Afg)

- Afghanistan won the toss and elected to field.

1 February 2024
10:00
Scorecard

| Scotland; 251/6 (50 overs) | v | Namibia; 248/6 (50 overs) |
| Bahadar Esakhiel 76* (54); Peter-Daniel Blignaut 2/42 (10 overs) | | Zacheo van Vuuren 86 (119); Ibrahim Faisal 3/58 (10 overs) |

Scotland won by 3 runs
Willowmoore Park, Benoni
Umpires: Phillip Gillespie (Aus) and Bongani Jele (SA)
Player of the match: Bahadar Esakhiel (Sco)

- Scotland won the toss and elected to bat.

== Super 6 ==
Teams will face each other in diagonally form in Super 6, means A1 will face D2 and D3, A2 will face D1 and D3, A3 will face D1 and D2.

=== Group 1 ===
==== Points table ====
| Pos | Team | Pld | W | L | T | NR | Pts | NRR | Qualification |
|---|---|---|---|---|---|---|---|---|---|
| 1 | India | 4 | 4 | 0 | 0 | 0 | 8 | 3.155 | Advance to the semi-finals |
| 2 | Pakistan | 4 | 4 | 0 | 0 | 0 | 8 | 0.452 | Advance to the semi-finals |
| 3 | Bangladesh | 4 | 2 | 2 | 0 | 0 | 4 | 0.167 | |
| 4 | Ireland | 4 | 1 | 3 | 0 | 0 | 2 | −1.163 | |
| 5 | New Zealand | 4 | 1 | 3 | 0 | 0 | 2 | −1.812 | |
| 6 | Nepal | 4 | 0 | 4 | 0 | 0 | 0 | −1.762 | |

Source: ESPNCricinfo

==== Fixtures ====
30 January 2024
10:00
Scorecard

| India; 295/8 (50 overs) | v | New Zealand; 81 (28.1 overs) |
| Musheer Khan 131 (126); Mason Clarke 4/62 (8 overs) | | Oscar Jackson 19 (38); Saumy Pandey 4/19 (10 overs) |

India won by 214 runs
Mangaung Oval, Bloemfontein
Umpires: Allahudien Paleker (SA) and Langton Rusere (Zim)
Player of the match: Musheer Khan (Ind)

- New Zealand won the toss and elected to field.

30 January 2024
10:00
Scorecard

| Ireland; 181 (48.4 overs) | v | Pakistan; 182/7 (43.4 overs) |
| John McNally 53 (81); Ubaid Shah 3/31 (10 overs) | | Ahmad Hassan 57* (72); Harry Dyer 4/35 (9.4 overs) |

Pakistan won by 3 wickets
JB Marks Oval, Potchefstroom
Umpires: Donovan Koch (Aus) and Masudur Rahman (Ban)
Player of the match: Ahmad Hassan (Pak)

- Pakistan won the toss and elected to field.

31 January 2024
10:00
Scorecard

| Nepal; 169 (49.5 overs) | v | Bangladesh; 170/5 (25.2 overs) |
| Bishal Bikram KC 48 (100); Rohanat Doullah Borson 4/19 (8.5 overs) | | Ariful Islam 59* (38); Subash Bhandari 5/44 (8 overs) |

Bangladesh won by 5 wickets
Mangaung Oval, Bloemfontein
Umpires: Faisal Afridi (Pak) and Rashid Riaz (Pak)
Player of the match: Rohanat Doullah Borson (Ban)

- Nepal won the toss and elected to bat.

2 February 2024
10:00
Scorecard

| India; 297/5 (50 overs) | v | Nepal; 165/9 (50 overs) |
| Sachin Dhas 116 (101); Gulsan Jha 3/56 (10 overs) | | Dev Khanal 33 (53); Saumy Pandey 4/29 (10 overs) |

India won by 132 runs
Mangaung Oval, Bloemfontein
Umpires: Faisal Afridi (Pak) and Allahudien Paleker (SA)
Player of the match: Sachin Dhas (Ind)

- India won the toss and elected to bat.

3 February 2024
10:00
Scorecard

| Pakistan; 155 (40.4 overs) | v | Bangladesh; 150 (35.5 overs) |
| Arafat Minhas 34 (40); Sheikh Paevez Jibon 4/24 (10 overs) | | Mohammad Shihab James 26 (43); Ubaid Shah 5/44 (10 overs) |

Pakistan won by 5 runs
Willowmoore Park, Benoni
Umpires: K. N. Ananthapadmanabhan (Ind) and Patrick Gustard (WI)
Player of the match: Ubaid Shah (Pak)

- Bangladesh won the toss and elected to field.

3 February 2024
10:00
Scorecard

| Ireland; 267/9 (50 overs) | v | New Zealand; 131/5 (32.1 overs) |
| Gavin Roulston 82 (102); Ewald Schreuder 4/46 (7 overs) | | James Nelson 34 (64); Oliver Riley 3/20 (7 overs) |

Ireland won by 41 runs (DLS method)
Mangaung Oval, Bloemfontein
Umpires: Rashid Riaz (Pak) and Langton Rusere (Zim)
Player of the match: Kian Hilton (Ire)

- Ireland won the toss and elected to bat.
- No further play was possible due to rain.

=== Group 2 ===
==== Points table ====
| Pos | Team | Pld | W | L | T | NR | Pts | NRR | Qualification |
|---|---|---|---|---|---|---|---|---|---|
| 1 | Australia | 4 | 3 | 0 | 0 | 1 | 7 | 2.781 | Advance to the semi-finals |
| 2 | South Africa | 4 | 3 | 1 | 0 | 0 | 6 | 1.683 | Advance to the semi-finals |
| 3 | West Indies | 4 | 2 | 1 | 0 | 1 | 5 | 0.134 | |
| 4 | England | 4 | 2 | 2 | 0 | 0 | 4 | 0.198 | |
| 5 | Sri Lanka | 4 | 1 | 3 | 0 | 0 | 2 | −0.532 | |
| 6 | Zimbabwe | 4 | 0 | 4 | 0 | 0 | 0 | −3.586 | |

Source: ESPNCricinfo

==== Fixtures ====
30 January 2024
10:00
Scorecard

| Sri Lanka; 231 (50 overs) | v | West Indies; 232/7 (49.3 overs) |
| Dinura Kalupahana 53 (83); Raneico Smith 4/47 (10 overs) | | Steve Wedderburn 61 (71); Vishwa Lahiru 2/32 (10 overs) |

West Indies won by 3 wickets
Diamond Oval, Kimberley
Umpires: Roland Black (Ire) and Bismillah Jan Shinwari (Afg)
Player of the match: Steve Wedderburn (WI)

- Sri Lanka won the toss and elected to bat.

31 January 2024
10:00
Scorecard

| Australia; 266/6 (50 overs) | v | England; 104 (16.5 overs) |
| Hugh Weibgen 120 (126); Theo Wylie 4/42 (10 overs) | | Charlie Allison 26 (16); Callum Vidler 4/29 (5 overs) |

Australia won by 110 runs (DLS method)
Diamond Oval, Kimberley
Umpires: Forster Mutizwa (Zim) and Gazi Sohel (Ban)
Player of the match: Hugh Weibgen (AUS)

- England won the toss and elected to field.
- England were set a revised target of 215 runs from 24 overs due to rain.

31 January 2024
10:00
Scorecard

| Zimbabwe; 102 (29.2 overs) | v | South Africa; 103/1 (13.3 overs) |
| Ronak Patel 32 (30); Kwena Maphaka 5/34 (10 overs) | | Lhuan-dre Pretorius 53* (39); Anesu Kamuriwo 1/31 (6 overs) |

South Africa won by 9 wickets
JB Marks Oval, Potchefstroom
Umpires: Nigel Duguid (WI) and Mike Burns (Eng)
Player of the match: Kwena Maphaka (SA)

- South Africa won the toss and elected to field.

2 February 2024
10:00
Scorecard

| Australia; 227/8 (50 overs) | v | West Indies; 24/2 (4.3 overs) |
| Sam Konstas 108 (121); Nathan Edward 3/32 (9 overs) | | Joshua Dorne 9 (12); Charlie Anderson 2/12 (2.3 overs) |

No result
Diamond Oval, Kimberley
Umpires: Roland Black (Ire) and Mike Burns (Eng)

- West Indies won the toss and elected to field.
- No further play was possible due to rain.

2 February 2024
10:00
Scorecard

| South Africa; 232/8 (50 overs) | v | Sri Lanka; 113 (23.2 overs) |
| Lhuan-dre Pretorius 71 (77); Supun Waduge 2/28 (10 overs) | | Sharujan Shanmuganathan 29 (32); Kwena Maphaka 6/21 (8.2 overs) |

South Africa won by 119 runs
JB Marks Oval, Potchefstroom
Umpires: Nigel Duguid (WI) and Gazi Sohel (Ban)
Player of the match: Kwena Maphaka (SA)

- Sri Lanka won the toss and elected to field.

3 February 2024
10:00
Scorecard

| England; 237/7 (50 overs) | v | Zimbabwe; 91 (24.5 overs) |
| Charlie Allison 76 (109); Newman Nyamhuri 2/50 (10 overs) | | Panashe Taruvinga 38 (61); Tazeem Ali 7/29 (7.5 overs). |

England won by 146 runs
JB Marks Oval, Potchefstroom
Umpires: Donovan Koch (Aus) and Masudur Rahman (Ban)
Player of the match: Tazeem Ali (Eng)

- Zimbabwe won the toss and elected to field.

== Knockout stage ==
=== Bracket ===
Semi Final
1A | India | 248/8 (48.5 overs)
2B | South Africa | 244/7 (50 overs)
2A | Australia | 181/9 (49.1 overs)
1B | Pakistan | 179 (48.5 overs)

Final
SFW1 | India | 174 (43.5 overs)
SFW2 | Australia | 253/7 (50 overs)

=== Semi-final ===
==== 1st Semi-final ====
6 February 2024
10:00
Scorecard

| South Africa; 244/7 (50 overs) | v | India; 248/8 (48.5 overs) |
| Lhuan-dre Pretorius 76 (102); Raj Limbani 3/60 (9 overs) | | Sachin Dhas 96 (95); Kwena Maphaka 3/32 (10 overs) |

India won by 2 wickets
Willowmoore Park, Benoni
Umpires: Donovan Koch (Aus) and Rashid Riaz (Pak)
Player of the match: Uday Saharan (Ind)

- India won the toss and elected to field.

==== 2nd Semi-final ====
8 February 2024
10:00
Scorecard

| Pakistan; 179 (48.5 overs) | v | Australia; 181/9 (49.1 overs) |
| Arafat Minhas 52 (61); Tom Straker 6/24 (9.5 overs) | | Harry Dixon 50 (75); Ali Raza 4/34 (10 overs) |

Australia won by 1 wicket
Willowmoore Park, Benoni
Umpires: Allahudien Paleker (SA) and Langton Rusere (Zim)
Player of the match: Tom Straker (Aus)

- Australia won the toss and elected to field.

=== Final ===
11 February 2024
10:00
Scorecard

| Australia; 253/7 (50 overs) | v | India; 174 (43.5 overs) |
| Harjas Singh 55 (64); Raj Limbani 3/38 (10 overs) | | Adarsh Singh 47 (77); Mahli Beardman 3/15 (7 overs) |

Australia won by 79 runs
Willowmoore Park, Benoni
Umpires: Allahudien Paleker (SA) and Langton Rusere (Zim)
Player of the match: Mahli Beardman (Aus)

- Australia won the toss and elected to bat.

== Final standings ==
| Pos. | Team |
|---|---|
| 1 | Australia |
| 2 | India |
| 3 | Pakistan |
| 4 | South Africa |
| 5 | West Indies |
| 6 | Bangladesh |
| 7 | England |
| 8 | Ireland |
| 9 | Sri Lanka |
| 10 | New Zealand |
| 11 | Nepal |
| 12 | Zimbabwe |
| 13 | Afghanistan |
| 14 | Scotland |
| 15 | Namibia |
| 16 | United States |

== Team of the tournament ==
On 12 February 2024, the ICC announced the team of the tournament.

- (South Africa) Lhuan-dre Pretorius (wk)
- (Australia) Harry Dixon
- (India) Musheer Khan
- (Australia) Hugh Weibgen (c)
- (India) Uday Saharan
- (India) Sachin Dhas
- (Cricket West Indies) Nathan Edward
- (Australia) Callum Vidler
- (Pakistan) Ubaid Shah
- (South Africa) Kwena Maphaka
- (India) Saumy Pandey
- (Scotland) Jamie Dunk (12th man)
