= Tazeem Ali =

English cricketer (born 2006)

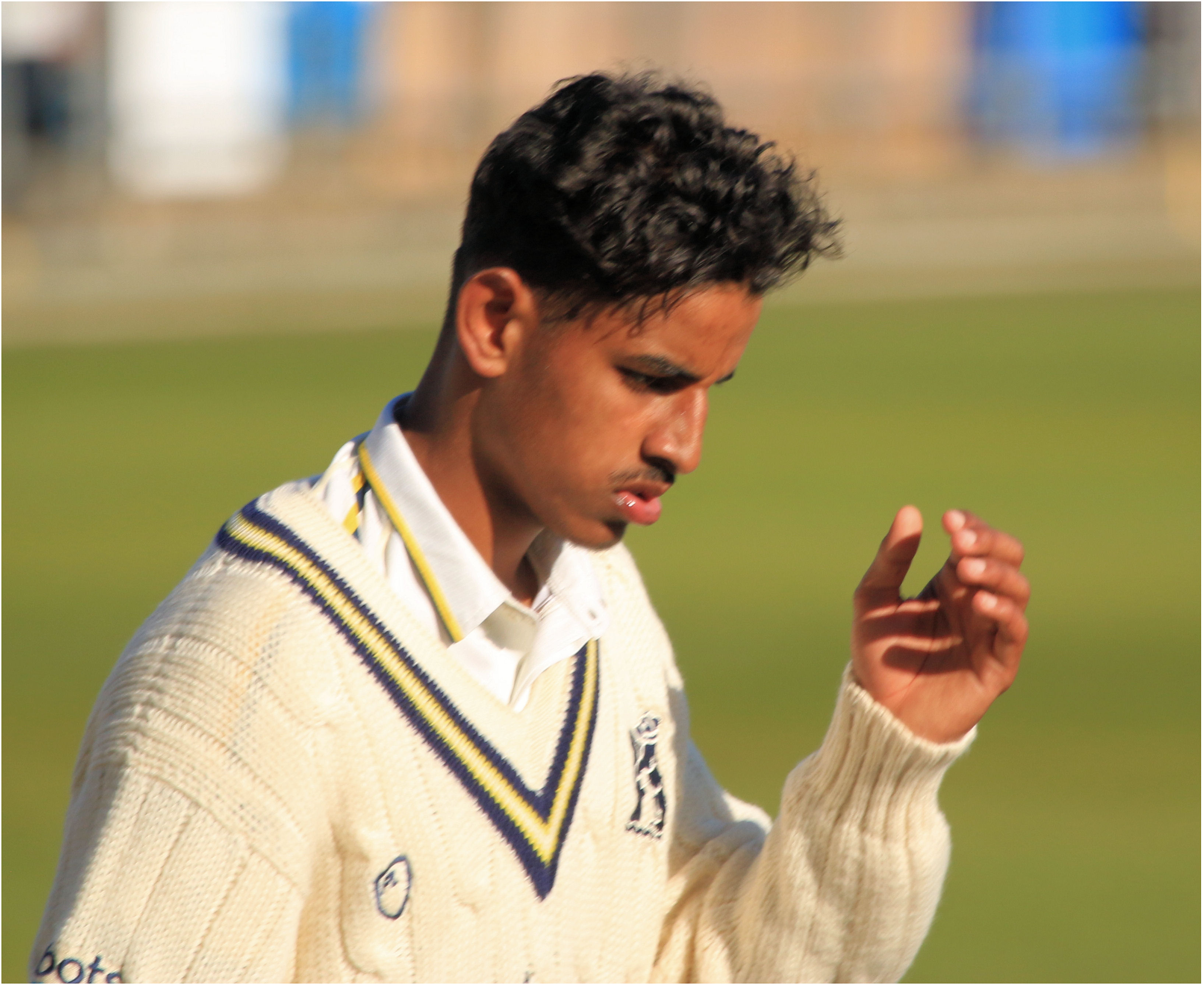
- Ali in 2025

Personal information
- Full name: Tazeem Chaudry Ali
- Born: 13 June 2006 (age 20); Amsterdam, Netherlands
- Batting: Right-handed
- Bowling: Right arm leg break
- Role: Bowler

Domestic team information
- Years: Team
- 2023–present: Warwickshire (squad no. 10)
- FC debut: 4 April 2025 Warwickshire v Sussex
- LA debut: 15 August 2023 Warwickshire v Derbyshire

Career statistics
Competition	FC	LA	T20
Matches	5	19	5
Runs scored	45	104	6
Batting average	9.00	17.33	6.00
100s/50s	0/0	0/0	0/0
Top score	12	17*	4
Balls bowled	672	819	78
Wickets	11	32	5
Bowling average	41.63	24.40	25.40
5 wickets in innings	0	2	0
10 wickets in match	0	0	0
Best bowling	4/66	5/43	4/25
Catches/stumpings	2/–	10/–	1/–
- Source: Cricinfo, 11 August 2026

Tazeem Chaudry Ali (born 13 June 2006) is a Dutch-born English cricketer who plays for Warwickshire and England U19, having previously represented Netherlands U19. He is a right-handed batsman and right arm leg spin bowler. He made his List-A cricket debut for Warwickshire against Derbyshire on 15 August 2023.

== Domestic career ==
Raised in Amsterdam, Ali played youth cricket for ACC Amsterdam and the Netherlands. After moving to the UK, he played club cricket for Attock CC in the Warwickshire League Premier Division. Having joined their pathway programme, he made his Second XI debut for Warwickshire as a 14-year-old.

He made his List-A cricket debut for Warwickshire as a 17-year-old, featuring against Derbyshire on 15 August 2023 in the One-Day Cup. In July 2024, he signed a two-year professional contract with the county. In the 2025 season, he made his a County Championship debut and took 11 wickets in five matches in Division One. In the One-Day Cup that season he took the joint second most wickets in the competition with 18, which included back-to-back five-wicket hauls including a career best 5–43 against Northamptonshire. He signed a new contract with the county at the end of the season.

== International career ==
Ali represented the Netherlands at the 2021 Under-19 World Cup European Qualifier, but the Dutch failed to progress. He was later named in the England U19 squad for the 2024 Under-19 Cricket World Cup. During the tournament he took 7/29 against Zimbabwe U19, the best bowling figures by an English bowler at an Under-19 World Cup.
