= Ben Pomare =

New Zealand cricketer

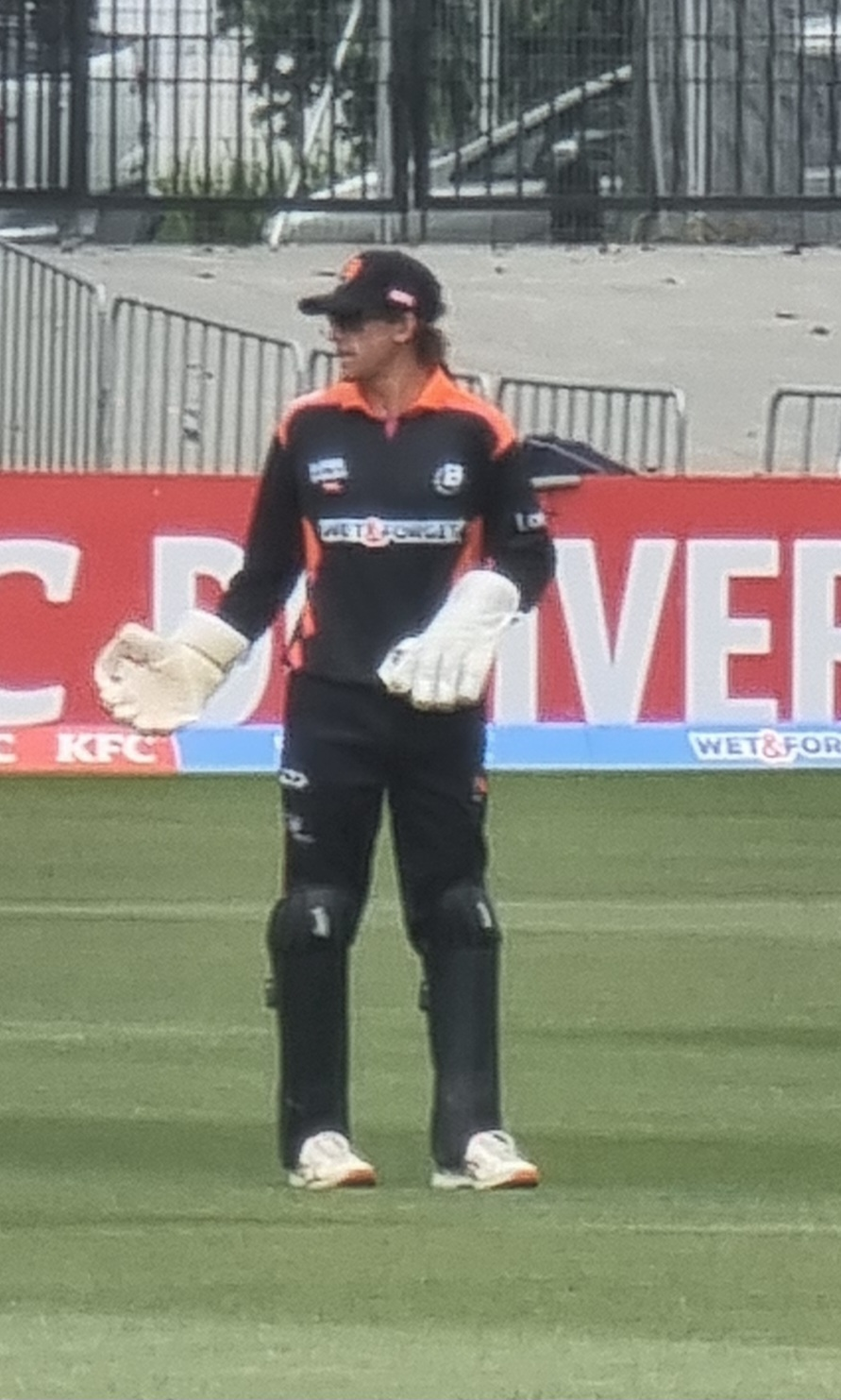
- Pomare playing for Northern Districts in 2025.

Personal information
- Full name: Benjamin James Pomare
- Born: 15 September 2000 (age 26); Tauranga, New Zealand
- Batting: Right-handed
- Bowling: Right arm offbreak
- Role: Wicket-keeper

Domestic team information
- Years: Team
- 2021/22-present: Northern Districts

Career statistics
| Competition | FC | LA | T20 |
|---|---|---|---|
| Matches | 11 | 9 | 10 |
| Runs scored | 310 | 185 | 110 |
| Batting average | 28.18 | 23.12 | 15.71 |
| 100s/50s | 0/1 | 0/2 | 0/0 |
| Top score | 82* | 63 | 29 |
| Catches/stumpings | 51/2 | 4/1 | 4/2 |
- Source: Cricinfo, 31 December 2025

Benjamin James Pomare (born 15 September 2000) is a New Zealand cricketer who represents Northern Districts in domestic competitions. His primary playing role is wicket-keeper.

Pomare was born in Tauranga in the Bay of Plenty, attended Tauranga Boys' College and represents the Mount Maunganui cricket club. He made his first-class debut against Wellington in the 2021–22 Plunket Shield season. He made his List A debut in the 2023–24 season, and his Twenty20 debut the season after.

Pomare also represented New Zealand at the 2020 Under-19 Cricket World Cup.
