= Matt Boyle =

New Zealand cricketer

Personal information
- Full name: Matthew William Thwaites Boyle
- Born: 12 January 2003 (age 23); Christchurch, New Zealand
- Batting: Left-handed
- Bowling: Right-arm leg spin
- Role: Batsman
- Relatives: Justin Boyle (father); David Boyle (uncle); Jack Boyle (brother)

Domestic team information
- Years: Team
- 2022/23–present: Canterbury (squad no. 36)
- 2026: Middlesex (squad no. 36)

Career statistics
Competition	FC	LA	T20
Matches	26	34	34
Runs scored	1,483	842	761
Batting average	35.30	28.06	26.24
100s/50s	3/10	1/2	0/4
Top score	156*	131	81*
Balls bowled	657	140	96
Wickets	9	2	3
Bowling average	38.44	69.00	43.66
5 wickets in innings	0	0	0
10 wickets in match	0	0	0
Best bowling	4/87	1/26	2/16
Catches/stumpings	25/–	16/–	22/–
- Source: Cricinfo, 16 July 2026

Matthew William Thwaites Boyle (born 12 January 2003) is a New Zealand cricketer.

A left-handed middle-order batsman, Boyle made his List A debut for Canterbury against Wellington on 22 November 2022, and his first-class and Twenty20 debuts later in the same season.

Boyle scored his first century for Canterbury in a first-class game against Central Districts on 20 November 2024, during the 2024–25 Plunket Shield season. In November 2025 he top-scored in each innings of Canterbury's victory over Northern Districts, making 70 and 156 not out.

In May 2026, Boyle signed for Middlesex for the duration of the 2026 T20 Blast.

== Personal life ==
Boyle is the son of former provincial cricketer Justin Boyle. His uncle, David, also played for Canterbury. His brother Jack plays for Otago, having previously represented Canterbury and Central Districts.
