= Thomas O'Connor (cricketer) =

New Zealand cricketer

Personal information
- Full name: Thomas Charles O'Connor
- Born: 10 August 2004 (age 22); Dunedin, New Zealand
- Batting: Right-handed
- Bowling: Left-arm medium
- Role: Bowler
- Relatives: Shayne O'Connor (father)

Domestic team information
- Years: Team
- 2024/25–: Otago

Career statistics
Competition	FC	LA
Matches	6	3
Runs scored	132	37
Batting average	22.00	18.50
100s/50s	0/1	0/0
Top score	84*	29
Balls bowled	921	90
Wickets	29	1
Bowling average	16.65	79.00
5 wickets in innings	2	0
10 wickets in match	1	–
Best bowling	7/58	1/19
Catches/stumpings	1/–	0/–
- Source: Cricinfo, 30 March 2026

Thomas Charles O'Connor (born 10 August 2004) is a New Zealand cricketer who has played for Otago since the 2024–25 season.

Born in Dunedin in August 2004, O'Connor was educated at Otago Boys' High School and played Hawke Cup cricket for Otago Country. His father, Shayne O'Connor, played Test cricket for New Zealand in the 1990s.

A left-arm medium-pace bowler, in his fourth first-class match, playing for Otago against Auckland in the 2025–26 Plunket Shield, O'Connor took 7 for 58 and 6 for 31, leading Otago to a nine-wicket victory.
