= Theo Wylie =

English cricketer

Personal information
- Full name: Theo Owen Wylie
- Born: 17 January 2006 (age 20); Rugeley, Staffordshire, England
- Batting: Right-handed
- Bowling: Slow left-arm orthodox
- Role: All-rounder

Domestic team information
- Years: Team
- 2024–2026: Warwickshire (squad no. 21)
- List A debut: 24 July 2024 Warwickshire v Essex

Career statistics
Competition	List A
Matches	5
Runs scored	81
Batting average	20.25
100s/50s	0/1
Top score	65
Balls bowled	30
Wickets	0
Bowling average	–
5 wickets in innings	–
10 wickets in match	–
Best bowling	–
Catches/stumpings	2/–
- Source: Cricinfo, 10 November 2026

Theo Owen Wylie (born 17 January 2006) is an English cricketer who has played for Warwickshire County Cricket Club and the England national under-19 cricket team. He is a right handed batsman and left arm orthodox spin bowler.

== Early life ==
From Rugeley, he attended Shrewsbury School and scored an unbeaten century as they defeated Manchester Grammar School in June 2023, to win the U17 National Boys Cup. He played club cricket for Moddershall & Oulton, and played for Shifnal in the Birmingham League Premier Division Two in 2023, and also made his debut for minor counties side Shropshire County Cricket Club that summer.

== Domestic career ==
A spinning all-rounder, he started his junior career as a left-arm fast bowler and a lower middle order batsman but following an injury started to open the batting and adapted to left arm spin bowling.

Wylie joined the academy of Warwickshire County Cricket Club in July 2023. In July 2024, he signed a two-year professional contract with the county. He made his One-Day Cup debut on 24 July 2024 against Essex.

Wylie scored his first century for Shropshire in May 2026 against Cheshire. Later that season, he played as Warwickshire won the second-XI T20 Cup.

== International career ==
An England U19 international, he scored 150 against the Australia national under-19 cricket team, and followed that up with a century against Ireland U19 in the summer of 2023. He was named in the England team for the 2024 Under-19 Cricket World Cup.

On September 9, 2026 he appeared as a substitute fielder in England's Third Test against Pakistan at Edgbaston, where he caught Shan Masood at mid-on.
