= Harjas Singh =

Australian cricketer (born 2005)

Personal information
- Full name: Harjas Singh
- Born: 31 January 2005 (age 21); Sydney, New South Wales, Australia
- Batting: Left-handed
- Bowling: Right-arm medium
- Role: All Rounder

Domestic team information
- Years: Team
- 2026/27–present: New South Wales
- Source: ESPNCricinfo

Harjas Singh (born 31 January 2005) is an Australian cricketer who plays for New South Wales. He is a right arm medium pace bowler and a left-handed batsman. He plays his club cricket for Western Suburbs in NSW Premier Cricket.

== Personal life ==
Harjas Singh was born on January 31, 2005, in Sydney, New South Wales, Australia, to Indian origin parents who had migrated from Chandigarh in 2000. He began playing cricket at eight, initially featuring as a substitute for the Revesby Workers Cricket Club in New South Wales.

Singh was coached by Neil D’Costa—who has trained several prominent cricketers, including Michael Clarke, Phil Hughes, Mitchell Starc, and Marnus Labuschagne. Raised in a Punjabi household, he attributes his strong wrists to the martial art of Gatka, which simulates sword fighting with wooden sticks and shields. "You have to have very strong wrists for that," Singh noted.

Originally a right-handed batter, Singh switched to batting left-handed as a child to avoid breaking windows while playing in the backyard, though he continues to bowl and throw right-handed. Reflecting on his journey, he has spoken about the challenges of standing out as a cricketer of Indian heritage, emphasizing the need for extra effort to establish his identity in the sport.

== Career ==
Singh notched his Youth Test career debut in September 2023 against England U19s in Northampton. He scored 100 runs off 169 balls in the first inning and 31 off 36 in the second inning. He also bowled 17 full overs conceding 57 runs while forcing 5 maiden overs and taking 1 wicket, leading to an eventual win for Australia U19s. Singh then made his youth ODI debut for the Australia national under-19 cricket team against Bangladesh U19 in January 2023. He played for Australia U19 and helped secure a win in the final of the 2024 Under-19 Cricket World Cup against India, scoring a match high of 55 runs off 64 deliveries, including 6 total boundaries and 3 sixes.

In October 2025, Singh rose to prominence by scoring 314 off 141 balls in a 50-over game in NSW Premier Cricket, playing for Western Suburbs against the Sydney Cricket Club at Pratten Park. Singh's innings included 35 sixes, and was the third highest ever score in the history of NSW premier cricket, and the highest limited overs score in first grade premier cricket anywhere in Australia. Singh was called up to New South Wales's Second XI team the following week. Singh also received a last minute call up to the Sydney Sixers squad as a local replacement player on the eve of the 2025-26 Big Bash League season, however didn't play a game for the team.

Following Singh's rise to prominence the previous season, he was rewarded with his first state contract with New South Wales, receiving a rookie contract.
