= James Hartshorn =

New Zealand cricketer (born 1997)

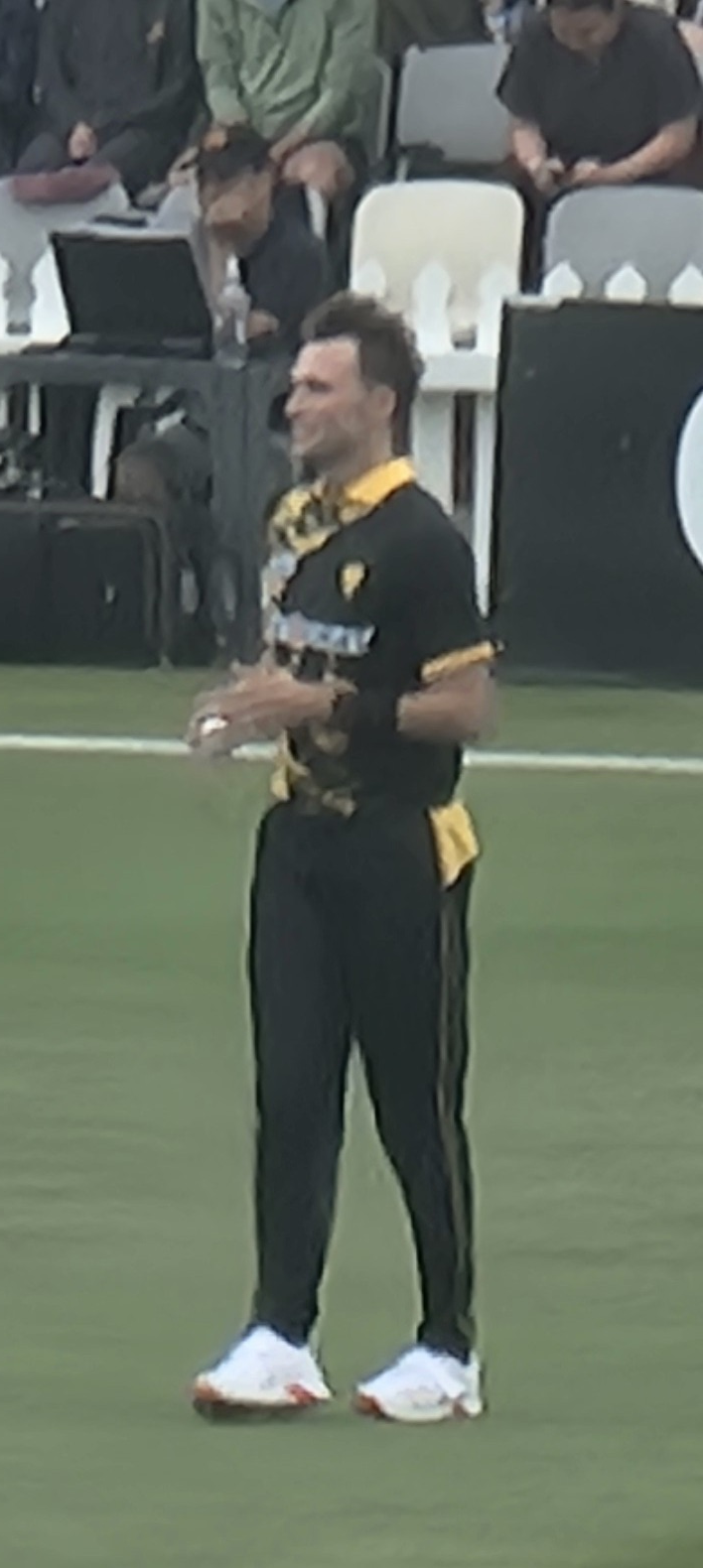
- Hartshorn playing for the Wellington Firebirds in 2026.

Personal information
- Born: 28 September 1997 (age 29)
- Source: Cricinfo, 29 November 2020

James Hartshorn (born 28 September 1997) is a New Zealand cricketer. He made his List A debut on 29 November 2020, for Wellington in the 2020–21 Ford Trophy. He made his first-class debut on 15 November 2021, for Wellington in the 2021–22 Plunket Shield season. He has played county cricket for Worcestershire.
