= Rohit Gulati =

New Zealand cricketer

Personal information
- Full name: Rohit Kumar Gulati
- Born: 2 November 1998 (age 28); Beas, Punjab, India
- Batting: Right-handed
- Bowling: Slow left-arm orthodox
- Role: Bowler

Domestic team information
- Years: Team
- 2024/25: Northern Districts
- 2025/26: Auckland

Career statistics
Competition	FC	LA	T20
Matches	8	7	12
Runs scored	84	50	7
Batting average	8.40	50.00	7.00
100s/50s	0/0	0/0	0/0
Top score	34	22*	3*
Balls bowled	1,919	360	228
Wickets	30	9	9
Bowling average	30.40	22.22	29.77
5 wickets in innings	2	0	0
10 wickets in match	1	–	–
Best bowling	6/51	3/22	3/20
Catches/stumpings	3/–	2/–	4/–
- Source: Cricinfo, 11 March 2026

Rohit Kumar Gulati (born 2 November 1998) is a New Zealand cricketer who plays for Auckland. Born in the Indian state of Punjab, he moved to New Zealand in 2022.

Gulati is a slow left-arm orthodox spin bowler. He was born in the Punjab town of Beas, and played cricket for Punjab under-age teams. He aimed to play for Punjab, but while he was recovering from a leg injury, a cousin in the Auckland southern suburb of Weymouth suggested he join him at the Weymouth Cricket Club in the Counties Manukau Cricket Association, which he did in 2022. He represented Counties Manukau from 2022–23 to 2024–25, and made his first-class debut for Northern Districts in a Plunket Shield match in March 2025, taking three wickets in the drawn game.

Northern Districts did not offer Gulati a contract for the 2025–26 season, so in 2025 he transferred to the Papatoetoe Cricket Club in the Auckland Cricket Association, thus qualifying to play for Auckland. He was immediately selected for the Auckland Plunket Shield team, and took 5 for 46 in the second innings of the first match against Central Districts as Auckland completed an innings victory. In his next match he took 10 wickets (match figures of 73–23–175–10) in a draw against his previous team, Northern Districts. At the mid-point of the Plunket Shield season, Gulati was the tournament's leading wicket-taker with 22 wickets, and Auckland led the points table.
