= Harry Dixon (cricketer) =

Australian cricketer

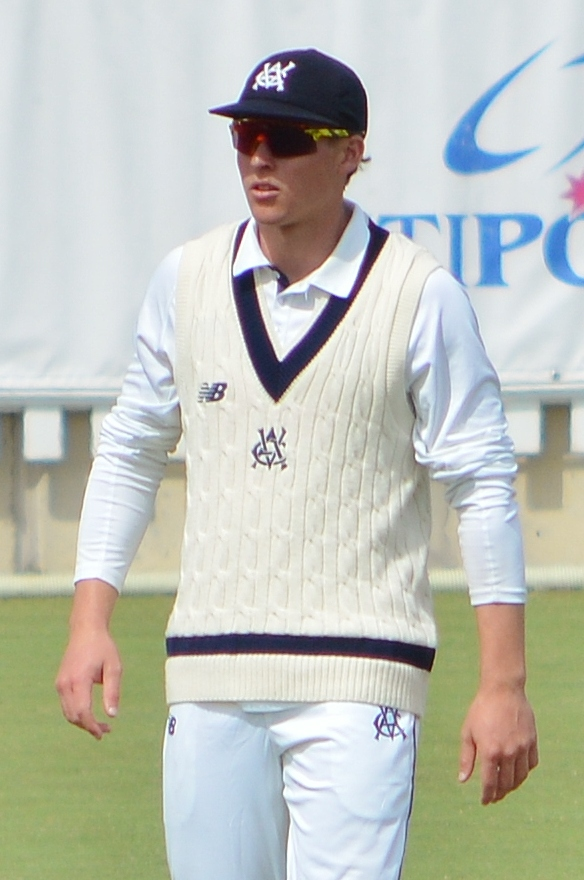
- Dixon playing First Class cricket with Victoria in October 2025

Personal information
- Full name: Harry Thomas Dixon
- Born: 13 February 2005 (age 21)
- Batting: Left-handed
- Bowling: Right-arm off spin
- Role: All-rounder

Domestic team information
- Years: Team
- 2024/25–2025/26: Melbourne Renegades
- 2024/25–present: Victoria

Career statistics
Competition	FC	LA	T20
Matches	9	13	4
Runs scored	327	145	26
Batting average	18.16	13.18	8.66
100s/50s	0/2	0/1	0/0
Top score	76	57	13
Balls bowled	36	72	–
Wickets	1	1	–
Bowling average	25.00	61.00	–
5 wickets in innings	0	0	–
10 wickets in match	0	0	–
Best bowling	1/16	1/14	–
Catches/stumpings	7/–	5/–	0/–
- Source: ESPNcricinfo, 3 October 2026

Harry Thomas Dixon (born 16 February 2005) is an Australian cricketer who plays for the Victorian cricket team and the Melbourne Renegades. He is a left-handed batsman and right arm off break bowler. Dixon represented Australia in their victory in the 2024 Under-19 Cricket World Cup, where he was the team's leading run-scorer.

== Early life and career ==
Dixon began playing cricket aged seven years-old. He played for Malvern, before moving to Toorak Prahran. He started playing for Victoria under-15s in 2018, when he was 13-year-old. He attended Melbourne Grammar School. He began playing in Victorian Premier Cricket for St Kilda Cricket Club in 2017, and made his first XI debut in the 2021–22 season at 16 years of age. He scored his first century at first-grade level in February 2023.

Dixon began playing for the Australian under-19 team in 2023. Playing against England, he scored 148 in a youth one-day match in February 2023, then in August 2023 scored 167 in a youth Test match, also against England.

In December 2023, Dixon was selected in Australia's squad for the 2024 Under-19 Cricket World Cup in South Africa. Australia won the tournament, and he was selected for ESPNcricinfo's Team of the Tournament with an average of 44.14 and a strike rate of 81.

Playing for St Kilda in December 2024, Dixon struck 34 runs in a single over in a Premier Cricket game.

== Professional cricket career ==
After playing for the Melbourne Stars academy side in a tournament in Darwin in 2023, Dixon was signed by cross-town rivals the Melbourne Renegades on a two-year professional contract. He also trained with the Victorian cricket team in the lead-up to the 2023–24 season, but did not acquire a rookie contract with the team until May 2024.

After not playing for the Melbourne Renegades or Victoria at all in the 2023–24 season, Dixon made his Big Bash League debut for the Renegades against the Melbourne Stars on 12 January 2025. He then made his first-class debut for Victoria in the Sheffield Shield on 8 February 2025 against Tasmania, top-scoring in the first innings with a score of 66. Dixon also made his debut for Victoria's one-day team for whom he scored 57 from 37 balls in his second match. Dixon scored another half-century in his third Sheffield Shield match, with 76 runs opening the batting for Victoria, impressing Victorian coach and former Australian Test cricketer Chris Rogers. Dixon was upgraded to a full contract with Victoria in May 2025.

== Style of play ==
A left-handed opening batsman with the capacity to be destructive at the top of the order, Dixon has said that he idolises Australian batsman David Warner. His aggressive batting style has been compared by Chris Rogers to that of Warner and Travis Head.
