= Callum Vidler =

Australian cricketer (born 2005)

Personal information
- Full name: Callum Andrew Vidler
- Born: 14 October 2005 (age 21)
- Batting: Right-handed
- Bowling: Right-arm fast
- Role: Bowler

Domestic team information
- Years: Team
- 2023/24: Queensland (squad no. 98)

Career statistics
Competition	FC	List A
Matches	3	2
Runs scored	3	1
Batting average	3.00	–
100s/50s	0/0	0/0
Top score	3*	1*
Balls bowled	447	90
Wickets	12	5
Bowling average	28.25	20.40
5 wickets in innings	0	0
10 wickets in match	0	0
Best bowling	4/64	3/36
Catches/stumpings	0/–	0/–
- Source: ESPNcricinfo, 22 March 2025

Callum Andrew Vidler (born 14 October 2005) is an Australian cricketer who plays for Queensland. Vidler is a right-arm fast bowler who has been recorded bowling at over 150 km/h. He was Australia's leading wicket-taker in the 2024 Under-19 Cricket World Cup in South Africa.

== Early life and junior career ==
Vidler attended Brisbane Grammar School. He plays club cricket for Valley District Cricket Club. With Queensland, he reached the final of the Under-19 Male National Cricket Championship in December 2023.

Vidler was the leading wicket taker for Australia in the U19 Ashes in 2023. In December 2023, he was signed by the Brisbane Heat as a Local Replacement Player, training with the squad during the 2023–24 Big Bash League season.

Vidler was part of Australia's squad in the 2024 Under-19 Cricket World Cup in South Africa, where he was Australia's leading wicket-taker with 14 wickets. In the semi-final against Pakistan, Vidler was part of a 17-run 10th wicket partnership with Raf MacMillan that secured Australia's place in the final, where Australia defeated India to win the tournament. He was named in the ICC's Team of the Tournament.

== Cricket career ==
In February 2024, Vidler was included in the Queensland cricket team first team squad in the Sheffield Shield. He made his first-class debut for Queensland against New South Wales, on 11 March 2024 in Sheffield Shield season. He signed a full-time contract with Queensland in April 2024. His third first class game was the Sheffield Shield Final in March 2025, in which he took 4-64 in South Australia’s first innings, including the wickets of Australian Test batters Nathan McSweeney and Alex Carey.

Vidler was named in the Australia A squad for a one-day series in India to start the 2025–26 season. To prepare for the series, he played in a Twenty20 competition in Queensland for his local club Valley District, but after this tournament scans revealed a partial stress fracture in his back. The injury ruled him out of the Australia A series and he entered a rehab process with no set date for his return to cricket.

== Playing style ==
A right-arm fast bowler, his bowling has been recorded at a speed of over 150kph. He has also shown an ability to generate swing on pitches that don't support much ball movement.
