= Jack Boyle (cricketer) =

New Zealand cricketer (born 1996)

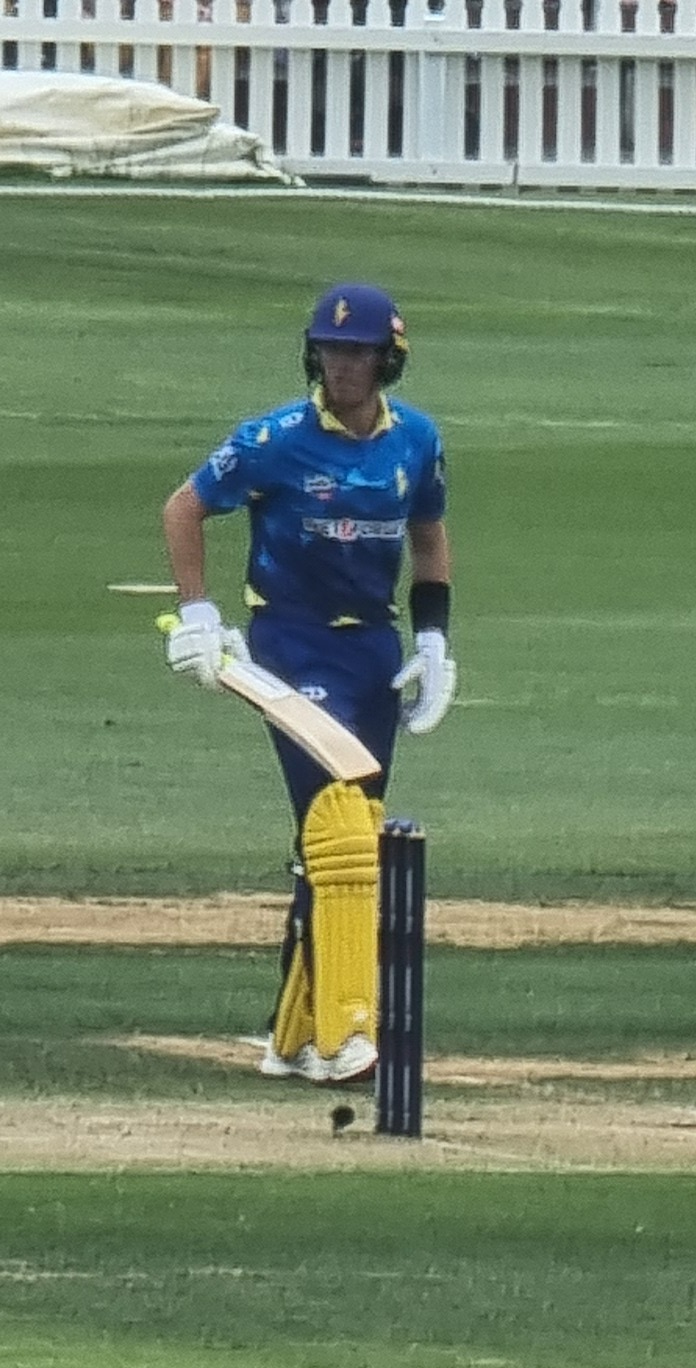
- Boyle playing for the Otago Volts in 2026.

Personal information
- Full name: John Christopher Thwaites Boyle
- Born: 24 March 1996 (age 30); Christchurch, New Zealand
- Batting: Right-handed
- Bowling: Right-arm off break
- Role: Batsman
- Relatives: Justin Boyle (father); David Boyle (uncle); Matt Boyle (brother)

Domestic team information
- Years: Team
- 2016/17–2021/22: Canterbury
- 2023/24–2024/25: Central Districts
- 2025/26: Otago

Career statistics
Competition	FC	LA	T20
Matches	35	58	34
Runs scored	1,318	2,016	769
Batting average	22.33	36.65	24.03
100s/50s	2/3	5/9	0/5
Top score	117	130	82*
Balls bowled	125	18	12
Wickets	5	0	1
Bowling average	10.80	–	18.00
5 wickets in innings	0	–	0
10 wickets in match	0	–	0
Best bowling	3/21	–	1/18
Catches/stumpings	25/–	29/–	13/–
- Source: Cricinfo, 7 July 2025

John Christopher Thwaites Boyle (born 24 March 1996) is a New Zealand cricketer. Born at Christchurch, he lived at Oamaru in Otago as young child whilst his father, Justin Boyle, was the rector of St Kevin's College in the town. His father and uncle, David Boyle, both played first-class cricket; Boyle's brother Matt, made his representative debut for Canterbury in 2022–23.

Boyle played age-group and A team cricket for Canterbury before making his first-class debut on 22 November 2016 in the 2016–17 Plunket Shield season. He made his List A debut for Canterbury on 15 January 2017 in the 2016–17 Ford Trophy.

In October 2018, he scored his maiden century in first-class cricket, batting for Canterbury against Northern Districts in the 2018–19 Plunket Shield season. He made his Twenty20 debut on 15 December 2019, for Canterbury in the 2019–20 Super Smash.

In June 2020, he was offered a contract by Canterbury ahead of the 2020–21 domestic cricket season.

Ahead of the 2022/23 domestic season, Boyle was offered a contract with Central Districts. After three seasons with the side, he left to join Otago ahead of the 2024–25 season.
