= Musheer Khan =

Indian cricketer (born 2005)

Personal information
- Full name: Musheer Naushad Khan
- Born: 27 February 2005 (age 21); Mumbai, Maharashtra, India
- Batting: Right-handed
- Bowling: Left-arm orthodox spin
- Role: All-rounder
- Relatives: Sarfaraz Khan (brother); Naushad Khan (Father)

Domestic team information
- Years: Team
- 2022/23–present: Mumbai
- 2025–present: Punjab Kings

Career statistics
Competition	FC	LA	T20
Matches	15	8	1
Runs scored	1,055	245	0
Batting average	47.95	40.83	0.00
100s/50s	4/3	0/3	0/0
Top score	203*	73	0
Balls bowled	1,079	361	12
Wickets	21	10	1
Bowling average	26.57	32.70	27.00
5 wickets in innings	1	0	0
10 wickets in match	0	0	0
Best bowling	5/79	3/37	1/27
Catches/stumpings	7/–	3/–	0/–
Medal record
Men's Cricket
Representing India
ICC Under-19 Cricket World Cup
Runner-up	2024 South Africa
- Source: ESPNcricinfo, 25 January 2026

Musheer Naushad Khan (born 27 February 2005) is an Indian cricketer who plays for Mumbai. He made his first-class cricket debut on 27 December 2022 for Mumbai in the 2022–23 Ranji Trophy. As a right-handed batsman all-rounder, Khan represented the 2024 Under-19 Cricket World Cup as a member of the Indian U-19 cricket team.

In December 2023, he was selected for the 2024 ICC U-19 Cricket World Cup squad for the Indian U-19 youth team. Indian team finished runner's up in the tournament in which Khan scored two centuries. In March 2024, Musheer broke Sachin Tendulkar's record to become the youngest Mumbai batter to score a hundred in the Ranji Trophy final.

In September 2024, he debut in Duleep Trophy for India B against India A at Mangalam Chinnaswamy in Bengaluru. In his debut match Musheer Khan hits his third First-Class century.

== Early life ==
Musheer was born in 2005 at Azamgarh, Uttar Pradesh. and he was brought up in the suburbs of Mumbai. His family hails from Azamgarh, Uttar Pradesh. He spent most of his childhood in Azad Maidan with Naushad Khan, his father and coach. Musheer is the younger brother of the fellow Mumbai batsman Sarfaraz Khan who is 8 years older than Musheer.
