= St Thomas of Canterbury College =

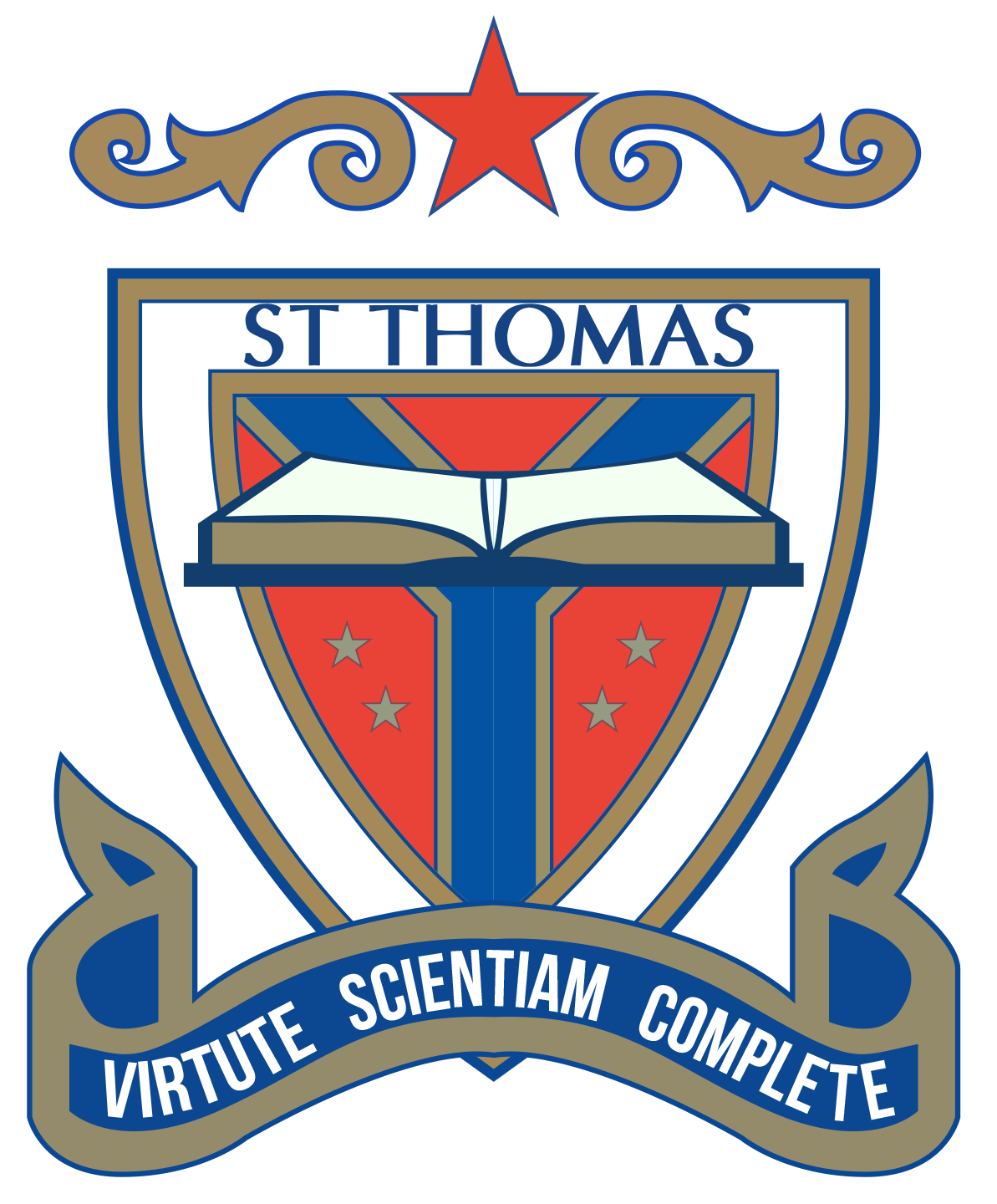

Location
- 69 Middlepark Rd; Sockburn, Christchurch 8042; New Zealand; 43.5344°S 172.5566°E

Information
- Type: State-integrated
- Motto: Latin: Virtute Scientiam Complete (The Perfection of Virtue and Knowledge)
- Religious affiliation: Catholic
- Established: 6 February 1961; 65 years ago
- Founders: Christian Brothers
- Sister school: Villa Maria College
- Ministry of Education Institution no.: 331
- Principal: Steve Hart
- Years offered: 9-13
- Gender: Boys
- Enrolment: 700 (July 2026)
- Campus size: 7 hectares (including sports grounds at 68 Middlepark Road)
- Houses: Joyce; Marlow; McClintock; Rice; Dowling
- Color: Blue Gold
- Song: Saint Thomas' Sons We Shall Remain
- Socio-economic decile: 8P
- Yearbook: Canterbury Tales
- Website: stc.school.nz

St Thomas of Canterbury College, often referred to as STC, is a college for year 9 to 13 boys and offers a Catholic education to its students. It is located in Christchurch, New Zealand. The college is integrated into the state education system under an integration agreement which was first entered into by the Christian Brothers (as the proprietors of the college) and the Government of New Zealand on 11 November 1981 under Section 7 of the Private Schools Conditional Integration Act 1975. St Thomas of Canterbury College is located in the Christchurch suburb of Sockburn. In 2026 the Catholic Bishop of Christchurch became the proprietor of the college.

== History ==
=== Origins ===
A Christian Brothers' school in Christchurch was first proposed in the 1880s. The third Catholic Bishop of Christchurch, Patrick Francis Lyons (Bishop 1944–1950) acquired land on Sockburn in West Christchurch and formally invited the Christian Brothers to provide the staff. There was no progress for several years. Eventually Brother Marlow, the Provincial of the Christian Brothers, and Edward Joyce, the fourth Catholic Bishop of Christchurch (Bishop 1950–1964), agreed, and St Thomas of Canterbury College held its first classes on 6 February 1961 (Waitangi Day – not a public holiday then).

=== Early days ===
The initial roll was 99 students. The foundation staff were Brothers James Ignatius McClintock (Principal), Ian T Mahon and Carroll. Brother Simon Germaine Coughlan joined them in 1962. The school expanded its area when eight acres was acquired on the other side of Middle Park Road to be used as sports fields. Later several smaller areas were acquired to extend the fields, provide better access to them from the school, provide changing sheds and to provide a site for a residence for the Brothers. In 1964 Edward Joyce, the Bishop of Christchurch, transferred the ownership of the school to the Christian Brothers. The college obtained scholastic success very early, especially when three students (J.G. Cleary, P.M. Heffernan and K.F. Hosking (Cleary and Hosking were both in the lower sixth form)) obtained Junior National University Scholarships in 1967. The New Zealand Herald commented that this was remarkable as St Thomas of Canterbury College was a new school and it was only the third year that it had an upper sixth form).

=== 2011 earthquake ===
Except for minor damage, the college was spared by the Christchurch earthquakes. As a result of the 22 February earthquake in 2011, Catholic Cathedral College relocated to St Thomas of Canterbury College and "site shared". Although it was not significantly damaged, parts of Catholic Cathedral College were under the unstable 400-ton dome of the Christchurch Catholic Cathedral. Because the dome was in imminent danger of collapse, the college had to move. St Thomas' restricted its own use of the school to the morning and Catholic Cathedral College took over the school in the afternoon. The dome was removed on 26 July and Catholic Cathedral College moved back to its own site on 1 August 2011.

=== Golden jubilee ===
In spite of the threat of earthquakes, the college celebrated its Golden Jubilee or 50th anniversary on 6–9 October 2011. "Around three hundred people were present and they revelled in: sports, fire dances, haka, tours, hāngī, dancing, food, drink, rugby and spiritual celebrations." The events included a "50th Jubilee Celebration Day" to allow Old Boys to meet the pupils and see the school operating during a school day. An assembly included a Pōwhiri, Waiata and other songs, a Samoan fire dance, a PowerPoint presentation of the history of the College, the presentation of a time capsule and the cutting of a Jubilee Cake. John Airey, the first student to arrive at the college on 6 February 1961 was presented to the assembly. This was followed by a Hāngī. There were sporting competitions with St Kevin's College to celebrate the 50th Anniversary of sporting exchanges between the two Colleges (they started in the school's first year). St Thomas's won the Rugby (54–0), but lost the Basketball (59–57) and the Football (4–0). A cricket match had to be cancelled because of rain. The 50th Celebration Dinner was held at the Showgate Room at Riccarton Raceway Function Centre. Former staff members including Christian Brothers were present. All these events were timed not to clash with games of the 2011 Rugby World Cup. The Jubilee Mass was celebrated by Bishop Barry Jones of Christchurch on Sunday 9 October in the St Thomas of Canterbury College hall.

=== Christian Brothers (1961-2026) ===
The school’s land and buildings were owned by the Trustees of Christian Brothers of New Zealand, a charitable trust, which is overseen by the Christian Brothers Oceania Province (which is centred in Australia and includes New Zealand).

In 2019 it was reported that the Christian Brothers intended to transfer ownership of the college to the Catholic Bishop of Christchurch. The transfer occurred seven years later in 2026 in the college's 65th year.

The last Christian Brother formally employed on the teaching staff of the college left in the early 2000s, but some brothers continued to teach at the college as volunteers including, in particular, Br William "Bill" Dowling who died in 2024.

=== Primary classes ===
For nearly 65 years until 2025, the college provided primary classes for year 7 and 8 students (i.e. boys normally aged 11 and 12). In 2024, the Crown approved a maximum roll increase from 615 to 685 beginning for the 2025 school year. This meant an increase of Year 9 classes from four to five. This increase was conditional on the removal of the primary classes. As a result, the last year 7 intake was in 2024 and the last year 8 intake was in 2025. From 2026 the College became a secondary school for Years 9 to 13 only.

=== Pastoral care ===
The school specifies its values as being "Brotherhood, Manawa, Compassion and Legacy" which are promoted as the basis of all educational activities.

On the 8th of September 2026, the College opened the first Te Whare Rama Pod as a pilot, a calming sanctuary where students can access a trained Pod Coach for guidance and calming tools, including guided breathing, grounding audio and tools. It was led by the Lighthouse Trust, a New Zealand trust established in 2024 by Anna and Kent Gibbons following the loss of their son Lucca Gibbons, aged 17 to mental health illness.

== Overview ==
=== Roll ===
As of July 1, 2024, the ethnic composition of St Thomas of Canterbury College was

Ethnic Group	Count
Maori	143
Pacific	128
Asian	76
MELAA	14
Other	1
European/Pakeha	473
International Students	14

*Note ethnicity is a multiple choice question, students may appear twice.

The college excels in sporting, cultural, scientific and enterprise activities. Academically, the school offers for senior years the National Certificate of Educational Achievement assessment system (NCEA). The College has an enrolment scheme "to avoid overcrowding, or the likelihood of overcrowding" that gives priority of enrolment to students if they meet the defined criteria of connection with the Catholic faith and live within the Catholic Parishes of Sockburn, Hornby and Darfield, Riccarton, Hoon Hay and Halswell, Leeston, Lincoln and Akaroa. These are generally to the west and south of the city of Christchurch

=== Houses ===
The names, colours and eponyms of the St Thomas of Canterbury College Houses are:

- Joyce – Red - Edward Joyce (1904-1964), 4th Bishop of Christchurch; a founder of the college.
- Marlow – Yellow - Br Christopher Claver Marlow (1892-1965); Provincial of the Christian Brothers in NZ (1959-1965); a founder of the college.
- McClintock – Green - Br James Ignatius McClintock (1910-1985); first principal of the college.
- Rice – Black - Edmund Ignatius Rice (1762-1844); the founder of the Christian Brothers.
- Dowling - Blue - Br William "Bill" Dowling (1939 - 2024); Member of the Christian Brothers and former staff of the college.

== Principals ==
The following individuals have served as Principal of Saint Thomas of Canterbury College

Person	Term	Notes
Br James McClintock	1961-1966	founding principal
Br F. C. Waigth	1967-1972	
Br J. H. Shepherd	1979-1981	
Br Vincent Jury	1982-1987	
Br N. C. Gillies	1988-1994	
Br Richard Walsh	1994-2000	
Bruce Stevenson	2001-2006	first non-Christian Brother principal
Christine O'Neill	2007-2017	later principal for Christchurch Girls High School
Steve Hart	2018–present	

== Notable alumni ==
- David Boyle (born 1961) - cricketer
- John Gerald Cleary – (1950-2014) computer science academic, entrepreneur, politician and promoter of transcendental meditation.
- David Correos – (born 1992) comedian and former weightlifter; winner of the Billy T Award in 2016.
- Sam Dickson – (born 1989) New Zealand rugby sevens player; member of the New Zealand national rugby sevens team to the 2016 Summer Olympics.
- Álvar Gimeno – (born 1997) Spanish professional rugby union player at centre for Valladolid and the Spain national team.
- Mark Garry Hammett – (born 1972) rugby union player for the New Zealand All Blacks; assistant coach for the Crusaders; coach for the Hurricanes; and rugby administrator.
- Uwe Helu – (born 1990) rugby union player for the Japan national team.
- Adam Highfield – (born 1981) professional New Zealand soccer player.
- The Holy Toledos – 1990s rock-folk group composed of Mick Gregg, Brendan Gregg, Adam Gallagher, Tom Mahon, and Paul McGuigan.
- Ryan Nelsen – (born 1977) international soccer player; captain of the All Whites, the New Zealand national football team.
- Vincent O'Malley – (born 1967) Historian.
- Darron Reekers – (born 1973) international cricketer; in Cricket World Cup squad for The Netherlands national cricket team.
- Jordan Riki - (born 2000) professional rugby league footballer for the Brisbane Broncos; four-time Māori all star; 2023 NRL Grand Final runner-up, 2025 NRL Grand Final Premiership Winner.
- Shaun Summerfield – (born 1971) Television Host & Journalist; presenter of long-running TV3 Show CRC Motorsport, and multi-award-winning Sports Journalist for 3 News

== See also ==
- List of schools in New Zealand
- Education in New Zealand
- Catholic Church in New Zealand

== Bibliography ==
- J.C. O'Neill, The History of the Work of the Christian Brothers in New Zealand, unpublished Dip. Ed. thesis, University of Auckland, 1968.
- St Thomas' Jubilee 1961–1986, St Thomas of Canterbury Jubilee Committee, Christchurch, 1986.
- Paul Malcolm Robertson, Nga Parata Karaitiana The Christian Brothers, A Public Culture in Transition, A Comparative Study of the Indian and New Zealand Provinces, an unpublished thesis for MA in Anthropology, University of Auckland, 1996.
- Graeme Donaldson, To All Parts of the Kingdom: Christian Brothers In New Zealand 1876–2001, Christian Brothers New Zealand Province, Christchurch, 2001.
- Education Review Office, Education Review Report: St Thomas of Canterbury College, November 2005
