= David Boyle (cricketer) =

New Zealand cricketer (born 1961)

Personal information
- Full name: David John Boyle
- Born: 14 February 1961 (age 65); Christchurch, New Zealand
- Batting: Right-handed
- Bowling: Right-arm off-break
- Role: Batsman
- Relatives: Justin Boyle (brother); Jack Boyle (nephew); Matt Boyle (nephew)

Domestic team information
- Years: Team
- 1980/81–1994/95: Canterbury
- Source: Cricinfo, 14 October 2020

David John Boyle (born 14 February 1961) is a New Zealand cricketer. He played in 69 first-class and 28 List A matches for Canterbury between the 1980–81 season and 1994–95.

Born at Christchurch in 1961, Boyle was educated at St Thomas of Canterbury College in the city. He played club cricket for the Burnside-West University and Marist clubs in Christchurch. An opening batsman who played wearing glasses, he made his first-class debut against a New Zealand under-23 team in December 1980. Batting in the middle-order on debut, he took three wickets with his off-breaks; in the remainder of his first-class career he took only six more.

After playing irregularly for the Canterbury team during the early-1980s whilst a student, and touring the country with the New Zealand Universities team, Boyle became an established member of the Canterbury team at the end of the 1985–86 season. He scored his maiden first-class century against Otago in February 1986, making 149 runs in a "solid and watchful" innings which featured "many handsome attacking strokes". He played regularly until the end of the 1993–94 season, scoring a total of 3,216 first-class runs, including three centuries.

Boyle's brother, Justin Boyle, played alongside him at Burnside-West before moving to Wellington. He returned to Canterbury during the mid-1980s and the brothers played alongside each other for the Canterbury team.

Since retiring from cricket Boyle has worked as a company director.
