= Lachlan Stackpole =

New Zealand cricketer

Lachie Stackpole
Personal information
- Full name: Lachlan Neal Stackpole
- Born: 27 March 2005 (age 21); Auckland, New Zealand
- Batting: Left-handed
- Bowling: Right-arm off-break, right-arm medium
- Role: Batsman

Domestic team information
- Years: Team
- 2024/25–: Auckland

Career statistics
Competition	FC	LA	T20
Matches	12	17	14
Runs scored	811	374	215
Batting average	42.68	24.93	19.54
100s/50s	2/3	0/2	0/1
Top score	172*	58*	66
Balls bowled	42	126	24
Wickets	2	2	1
Bowling average	17.50	55.50	28.00
5 wickets in innings	0	0	0
10 wickets in match	0	–	–
Best bowling	2/12	1/16	1/19
Catches/stumpings	10/–	6/–	6/–
- Source: Cricinfo, 13 November 2026 2026

Lachlan Neal Stackpole (born 27 March 2005) is a New Zealand cricketer who plays for Auckland.

Stackpole is a middle-order left-handed batsman and occasional right-arm bowler. He made his senior debut for Auckland in the 2024–25 Super Smash in January 2025. Later that season he played his first senior List A and first-class matches.

Stackpole established himself in first-class cricket in the 2025–26 Plunket Shield season, finishing third among the Shield run-scorers with 667 runs at an average of 51.30. He scored 148 off 112 balls, his first first-class century, against Central Districts in the first round of matches, and 172 not out off 179 balls against Wellington later in the season. Auckland won both matches.
