= Pulindu Perera =

Sri Lankan cricketer

Personal information
- Full name: Koskanwatte Gedera Piyasinghalage Pulindu Vinujaya Perera
- Born: 3 January 2006 (age 20)
- Batting: Left-handed
- Bowling: Right arm offbreak

Domestic team information
- Years: Team
- 2023-present: Burgher Recreation Club

Career statistics
Competition	FC	LA	T20
Matches	2	10	2
Runs scored	98	317	38
Batting average	24.50	35.22	19.00
100s/50s	0/1	1/1	0/0
Top score	65	111	20
Catches/stumpings	0/–	6/–	0/–
- Source: Cricinfo, 18 April 2025

Pulindu Perera (born 3 January 2006) is a Sri Lankan cricketer. He plays age-group cricket representing Sri Lanka national under-19 cricket team.

== Biography ==
He began pursuing cricketing ambitions in 2014 at the age of eight at the Cricket Academy of Dharmaraja College and was initially coached by Ananda Wijesekera. He studies at Dharmaraja College.

== Career ==
In March 2023, he completed 1000 runs in the schools season when he achieved the milestone against D. S. Senanayake College in an under-19 schools cricket match.

In September 2023, he scored a century against the West Indies under-19 cricket team during the third and final U-19 ODI of the series and was dismissed on 155. In October 2023, he scored a century against Pakistan under-19 cricket team during the first U-19 ODI match of the five match series and was dismissed on 156.

He was named in Sri Lankan squad for the 2023 ACC Under-19 Asia Cup which was held in the United Arab Emirates.

He made his List A debut playing for Burgher Recreation Club against Sinhalese Sports Club on 19 December 2023 at the 2023 Major Clubs Limited Over Tournament.
