= 2022–23 Plunket Shield season =

Cricket tournament

2022–23 Plunket Shield
- Dates: 18 October 2022 – 4 April 2023 (Note: The match between Central Districts and Auckland in round 5 was originally scheduled to start on 25 February 2023, but it was postponed due to the devastation caused in the Hawke's Bay region by Cyclone Gabrielle.)
- Administrator: New Zealand Cricket
- Cricket format: First-class
- Tournament format: Round-robin
- Champions: Central Districts (12th title)
- Participants: 6
- Matches: 24
- Most runs: Bharat Popli (819) (Northern Districts)
- Most wickets: Jacob Duffy (32) (Otago)

The 2022–23 Plunket Shield was the 97th season of the Plunket Shield, the domestic first-class cricket competition that was played in New Zealand. The tournament started on 18 October 2022, and the final round of matches was played in March 2023.

In their second-round match against Canterbury, Wellington were dismissed for just 80 runs in their first innings and 87 runs in their second, setting a new record-lowest score across two completed innings of a Plunket Shield match, and Wellington's lowest score in any first-class match since 1887.

On 17 March 2023, New Zealand Cricket (NZC) announced the date and venue for the rescheduled match between Central Districts and Auckland. Central Districts won the tournament to clinch their 12th Plunket Shield title, finishing on 101 points with 5 wins.

== Points table ==
Pos	Team	Pld	W	D	L	Pts
1	Central Districts (C)	8	5	1	2	101
2	Canterbury	8	4	3	1	101
3	Northern Districts	8	3	1	4	82
4	Auckland	8	2	3	3	66
5	Wellington	8	2	2	4	64
6	Otago	8	1	4	3	53

Source: ESPNcricinfo
Rules for classification: 1) points; 2) wins; 3) net average per wicket.
- Points system: 12 for a win, 6 for a tie, 0 for a draw or loss.
- Batting bonus points: 1 point each for reaching 200, 250, 300, and 350 runs within the first 110 overs of each team's first innings.
- Bowling bonus points: 1 point each for taking 3, 5, 7, and 9 wickets within the first 110 overs of each team's first innings.
  (C) Champion

== Fixtures ==
=== Round 1 ===
18–21 October 2022
Scorecard

Central Districts	v	Canterbury
302 (106.3 overs); Brett Randell 90* (131); Matt Henry 4/69 (28 overs)		416/9d (124.4 overs); Tom Latham 167 (308); Doug Bracewell 3/82 (24 overs)
176/9 (91 overs); Tom Bruce 74 (240); Matt Henry 3/43 (26 overs)

Match drawn
Saxton Oval, Nelson
Umpires: John Dempsey and Tim Parlane

- Central Districts won the toss and elected to bat.
- Only 39.5 overs of play were possible on day 1 due to rain.
- Points: Central Districts 5, Canterbury 8.

18–20 October 2022
Scorecard

Otago	v	Auckland
261 (87.2 overs); Thorn Parkes 54 (81); Will Somerville 3/51 (25 overs)		139 (59.1 overs); George Worker 52 (96); Jacob Duffy 5/27 (17.1 overs)
219 (72.4 overs); Thorn Parkes 58 (147); Sean Solia 4/45 (16.4 overs)		173 (56.3 overs); George Worker 40 (64); Travis Muller 3/28 (12 overs)

Otago won by 168 runs
Eden Park, Auckland
Umpires: Billy Bowden and Damian Morrow

- Auckland won the toss and elected to field.
- Points: Otago 18, Auckland 4.

18–21 October 2022
Scorecard

Northern Districts	v	Wellington
225 (76.1 overs); Bharat Popli 75 (166); Ian McPeake 4/83 (20 overs)		370 (106 overs); Rachin Ravindra 126 (253); Matthew Fisher 3/60 (15 overs)
394 (108.4 overs); Bharat Popli 127* (264); Ian McPeake 5/82 (19.4 overs)		252/9 (66.5 overs); Tom Blundell 68 (73); Matthew Fisher 5/68 (13 overs)

Wellington won by 1 wicket
Basin Reserve, Wellington
Umpires: Cory Black and Derek Walker

- Wellington won the toss and elected to field.
- Adam Leonard (Wellington) made his first-class debut.
- Matthew Fisher (Northern Districts) took his maiden five-wicket haul in first-class cricket.
- Points: Wellington 20, Northern Districts 5.

=== Round 2 ===
25–27 October 2022
Scorecard

Auckland	v	Central Districts
75 (34.5 overs); William O'Donnell 41 (86); Doug Bracewell 5/25 (11.5 overs)		361 (120.4 overs); Tom Bruce 169 (252); Adithya Ashok 5/106 (40.4 overs)
187 (85.1 overs); Cole Briggs 51 (133); Blair Tickner 4/39 (18 overs)

Central Districts won by an innings and 99 runs
Eden Park, Auckland
Umpires: Eugene Sanders and Tim Parlane

- Auckland won the toss and elected to bat.
- Adithya Ashok (Auckland) made his first-class debut.
- Adithya Ashok (Auckland) took his maiden five-wicket haul in first-class cricket.
- Points: Central Districts 18, Auckland 4.

26–29 October 2022
Scorecard

Northern Districts	v	Otago
355 (86.2 overs); Henry Cooper 112 (195); Jacob Duffy 7/107 (30 overs)		429 (150.3 overs); Thorn Parkes 96 (235); Neil Wagner 4/67 (23.3 overs)
258/9 (87 overs); Colin de Grandhomme 84 (98); Michael Rippon 4/109 (29 overs)

Match drawn
Bay Oval, Mount Maunganui
Umpires: Billy Bowden and John Dempsey

- Otago won the toss and elected to field.
- Only 66.5 overs of play were possible on day 1 due to rain and bad light.
- Points: Northern Districts 6, Otago 6.

26–28 October 2022
Scorecard

Canterbury	v	Wellington
123 (56.1 overs); Leo Carter 36 (119); Michael Snedden 4/24 (15 overs)		80 (36.4 overs); Nick Kelly 36 (29); Sean Davey 5/23 (13 overs)
334/8d (86 overs); Tom Latham 143* (232); Rachin Ravindra 3/57 (14 overs)		87 (45.4 overs); Ian McPeake 25 (96); Matt Henry 4/28 (16 overs)

Canterbury won by 290 runs
Basin Reserve, Wellington
Umpires: Cory Black and Shaun Haig

- Wellington won the toss and elected to field.
- Wellington's completed match aggregate of 167 runs was the lowest-ever total in the Plunket Shield, and their lowest in any first-class cricket since 1887.
- Points: Canterbury 16, Wellington 4.

=== Round 3 ===
5–8 November 2022
Scorecard

Central Districts	v	Northern Districts
273 (106.2 overs); Tom Bruce 59 (121); Kris Clarke 3/52 (15.2 overs)		161 (46.5 overs); Bharat Popli 75 (138); Doug Bracewell 4/30 (13 overs)
371/4d (101.4 overs); Brad Schmulian 200* (322); Colin de Grandhomme 2/48 (14 overs)		204 (79 overs); Jeet Raval 103* (227); Ajaz Patel 5/70 (25 overs)

Central Districts won by 279 runs
Saxton Oval, Nelson
Umpires: Cory Black and John Dempsey

- Central Districts won the toss and elected to bat.
- Curtis Heaphy (Central Districts) made his first-class debut.
- Points: Central Districts 18, Northern Districts 4.

5–7 November 2022
Scorecard

Wellington	v	Auckland
198 (78.4 overs); Tom Blundell 56 (79); Danru Ferns 2/37 (17 overs)		324 (130.2 overs); Ben Horne 79 (159); Ian McPeake 4/57 (23.2 overs)
132 (51.4 overs); Nick Kelly 28 (64); Ben Lister 4/34 (16 overs)		7/1 (2 overs); Sean Solia 6 (5); James Hartshorn 1/7 (1 overs)

Auckland won by 9 wickets
Basin Reserve, Wellington
Umpires: Kim Cotton and Wayne Knights

- Auckland won the toss and elected to field.
- Points: Auckland 18, Wellington 3.

5–8 November 2022
Scorecard

Otago	v	Canterbury
248 (109.3 overs); Michael Rippon 59 (134); Matt Henry 5/45 (30 overs)		511 (124 overs); Cole McConchie 214 (305); Travis Muller 4/112 (23 overs)
234 (87.1 overs); Michael Rippon 72* (141); Matt Henry 4/68 (22.1 overs)

Canterbury won by an innings and 29 runs
Hagley Oval, Christchurch
Umpires: Shaun Haig and Derek Walter

- Canterbury won the toss and elected to field.
- Points: Canterbury 20, Otago 3.

=== Round 4 ===
14–17 November 2022
Scorecard

Otago	v	Northern Districts
181 (69.4 overs); Jake Gibson 60* (61); Kris Clarke 2/26 (9 overs)		277 (63.5 overs); Scott Kuggeleijn 91 (98); Jacob Duffy 4/71 (22 overs)
345/9d (114 overs); Max Chu 78 (167); Neil Wagner 4/69 (25 overs)		254/5 (48.3 overs); Bharat Popli 78 (97); Michael Rippon 4/82 (14 overs)

Northern Districts won by 5 wickets
University Oval, Dunedin
Umpires: Shaun Haig and Kannan Jagannathan

- Otago won the toss and elected to bat.
- Tim Pringle (Northern Districts) made his first-class debut.
- Points: Northern Districts 18, Otago 4.

14–17 November 2022
Scorecard

Wellington	v	Central Districts
262 (77.1 overs); Tom Blundell 105 (132); Liam Dudding 5/65 (17 overs)		215 (77.4 overs); Doug Bracewell 78 (131); Logan van Beek 5/73 (22.4 overs)
269 (85.2 overs); Nick Kelly 105 (183); Doug Bracewell 4/80 (17 overs)		248 (75.3 overs); Will Young 105 (167); Logan van Beek 6/80 (21.3 overs)

Wellington won by 68 runs
Fitzherbert Park, Palmerston North
Umpires: Billy Bowden and Derek Walker

- Central Districts won the toss and elected to field.
- Liam Dudding (Central Districts) took his maiden five-wicket haul in first-class cricket.
- Points: Wellington 18, Central Districts 5.

14–17 November 2022
Scorecard

Auckland	v	Canterbury
438 (132 overs); Robert O'Donnell 123 (172); Henry Shipley 5/97 (28 overs)		509 (136.4 overs); Cole McConchie 130 (251); Robert O'Donnell 5/47 (17.4 overs)
252/6 (90 overs); George Worker 100* (153); Ed Nuttall 3/61 (20 overs)

Match drawn
Hagley Oval, Christchurch
Umpires: John Dempsey and Wayne Knights

- Auckland won the toss and elected to bat.
- Robert O'Donnell (Auckland) took his maiden five-wicket haul in first-class cricket.
- Points: Canterbury 8, Auckland 6.

=== Round 5 ===
25–28 February 2023
Scorecard

Northern Districts	v	Canterbury
273/9d (58 overs); Katene Clarke 58 (59); Henry Shipley 3/44 (12 overs)		335 (108.3 overs); Ish Sodhi 69 (168); Brett Hampton 5/67 (20 overs)
239 (72.1 overs); Jeet Raval 53 (82); Zak Foulkes 4/65 (16 overs)		180/6 (49.1 overs); Rhys Mariu 78* (133); Scott Johnston 5/47 (12 overs)

Canterbury won by 4 wickets
Seddon Park, Hamilton
Umpires: Tim Parlane and Tony Hill

- Canterbury won the toss and elected to field.
- Rhys Mariu (Canterbury) made his first-class debut.
- Points: Canterbury 19, Northern Districts 6.

25–28 February 2023
Scorecard

Wellington	v	Otago
368 (96.4 overs); Muhammad Abbas 79 (86); Jacob Duffy 4/92 (21.4 overs)		287 (80 overs); Dale Phillips 87 (142); Rachin Ravindra 3/19 (9 overs)
336/7d (94 overs); Rachin Ravindra 118 (204); Jarrod McKay 3/52 (14 overs)		348/8 (107.5 overs); Dean Foxcroft 159 (254); Luke Georgeson 1/37 (8 overs

Match Drawn
University Oval, Dunedin
Umpires: Cory Black and Shaun Haig

- Otago won the toss and elected to field.
- Muhammad Abbas (Wellington) made his first-class debut.
- Points: Wellington 8, Otago 6.

=== Round 6 ===
5–8 March 2023
Scorecard

Auckland	v	Wellington
508/6d (133.3 overs); Sean Solia 151 (374); Muhammad Abbas 2/42 (11 overs)		267 (93.1 overs); Gareth Severin 80 (215); Will Somerville 4/42 (28.1 overs)
143/1d (19 overs); William O'Donnell 75 (61); Kieran McComb 1/23 (3 overs)		299/8 (111 overs); Muhammad Abbas 130 (215); Adithya Ashok 5/94 (35 overs)

Match drawn
Colin Maiden Park, Auckland
Umpires: Billy Bowden and Wayne Knights

- Auckland won the toss and elected to bat.
- Quinn Sunde (Auckland) and Gareth Severin (Wellington) both made their first-class debut.
- Points: Auckland 8, Wellington 2.

5–8 March 2023
Scorecard

Northern Districts	v	Central Districts
513 (126.2 overs); Mitchell Santner 136 (176); Brad Schmulian 3/45 (12 overs)		245 (91.1 overs); Brad Schmulian 108 (243); Mitchell Santner 5/51 (26.1 overs)
194/7d (30.2 overs); Bharat Popli 70 (64); Brad Schmulian 2/19 (2 overs)		427 (130.2 overs); Tom Bruce 161 (256); Tim Pringle 3/92 (25 overs)

Northern Districts won by 35 runs
Bay Oval, Mount Maunganui
Umpires: Kannan Jagannathan and Tim Parlane

- Northern Districts won the toss and elected to bat.
- Points: Northern Districts 20, Central Districts 3.

6–9 March 2023
Scorecard

Canterbury	v	Otago
449/9d (107.1 overs); Chad Bowes 118 (82); Jake Gibson 3/39 (13.1 overs)		256 (63 overs); Dean Foxcroft 68 (78); William O'Rourke 3/54 (16 overs)
277/3d (56 overs); Mitchell Hay 98 (136); Glenn Phillips 2/72 (13 overs)		304/8 (110.3 overs); Glenn Phillips 147 (244); Henry Shipley 3/51 (20.3 overs)

Match drawn
University Oval, Dunedin
Umpires: Kim Cotton and Damian Morrow

- Canterbury won the toss and elected to bat.
- Points: Canterbury 8, Otago 6.

=== Round 7 ===
13–16 March 2023
Scorecard

Northern Districts	v	Wellington
405 (88.1 overs); Katene Clarke 129 (157); Logan van Beek 4/88 (23.1 overs)		221 (95.2 overs); Muhammad Abbas 95 (200); Kris Clarke 5/62 (18.2 overs)
206/8d (41 overs); Tim Seifert 57 (81); Rachin Ravindra 2/27 (5 overs)		388 (109.4 overs); Gareth Severin 196 (260); Mitchell Santner 4/119 (42.4 overs)

Northern Districts won by 2 runs
Seddon Park, Hamilton
Umpires: Billy Bowden and Derek Walker

- Wellington won the toss and elected to field.
- Points: Northern Districts 20, Wellington 5.

13–16 March 2023
Scorecard

Canterbury	v	Central Districts
186 (68.3 overs); Ish Sodhi 32 (78); Brett Randell 3/33 (17.3 overs)		282 (81 overs); Josh Clarkson 119 (146); Ish Sodhi 3/60 (17 overs)
236 (88.3 overs); Mitchell Hay 83 (194); Raymond Toole 3/36 (21.3 overs)		143/4 (20.5 overs); Josh Clarkson 44* (26); William O'Rourke 3/54 (7 overs)

Central Districts won by 6 wickets
Rangiora Recreation Ground, Rangiora
Umpires: Kim Cotton and Tim Parlane

- Canterbury won the toss and elected to bat.
- No play was possible on Day 1 due to rain.
- Matthew Boyle (Canterbury) made his first-class debut.
- Points: Central Districts 18, Canterbury 4.

13–16 March 2023
Scorecard

Auckland	v	Otago
351/9d (116 overs); Ben Horne 137 (202); Michael Rae 3/93 (23 overs)		454/9d (170 overs); Dale Phillips 129 (258); Adithya Ashok 3/125 (40 overs)
116/1 (34 overs); Mark Chapman 61* (65); Michael Rae 1/11 (7 overs)

Match drawn
Molyneux Park, Alexandra
Umpires: John Dempsey and Kannan Jagannathan

- Auckland won the toss and elected to bat.
- Points: Auckland 5, Otago 4.

=== Round 8 ===
21–24 March 2023
Scorecard

Otago	v	Central Districts
268 (76.1 overs); Dean Foxcroft 70 (97); Raymond Toole 4/78 (20 overs)		381 (108.2 overs); Jack Boyle 117 (240); Ben Lockrose 3/73 (23 overs)
300 (90.1 overs); Thorn Parkes 115 (193); Ajaz Patel 6/95 (39.1 overs)		190/5 (41.4 overs); Brad Schmulian 61 (60); Dean Foxcroft 3/34 (9 overs)

Central Districts won by 5 wickets
Fitzherbert Park, Palmerston North
Umpires: John Dempsey and Eugene Sanders

- Central Districts won the toss and elected to field.
- Play on Day 1 was restricted to 63 overs due to rain.
- Toby Findlay (Central Districts) made his first-class debut.
- Points: Central Districts 20, Otago 6

21–24 March 2023
Scorecard

Canterbury	v	Wellington
294 (86.4 overs); Rhys Mariu 112 (191); Peter Younghusband 4/50 (17.4 overs)		145 (57.2 overs); Callum McLachlan 100 (118); Sean Davey 7/25 (16 overs)
217/4d (43.3 overs); Mitchell Hay 81 (105); Peter Younghusband 3/52 (9.3 overs)		228 (90.5 overs); Muhammad Abbas 82 (169); Sean Davey 4/41 (20 overs)

Canterbury won by 138 runs
Rangiora Recreation Ground, Rangiora
Umpires: Kim Cotton and Tim Parlane

- Wellington won the toss and elected to field.
- Play on Day 1 was restricted to 44 overs due to rain.
- Jesse Tashkoff (Wellington) made his first-class debut.
- Points: Canterbury 18, Wellington 4

21–24 March 2023
Scorecard

Auckland	v	Northern Districts
350/5d (97 overs); George Worker 114 (222); Scott Kuggeleijn 2/92 (25 overs)		213/4d (27 overs); Bharat Popli 82* (164); Simon Keene 2/28 (10 overs)
278/8d (55.5 overs); Will Somerville 52* (48); Tim Pringle 3/83 (16 overs)		344 (90.5 overs); Bharat Popli 101* (148); Danru Ferns 5/79 (20 overs)

Auckland won by 71 runs
Eden Park, Auckland
Umpires: Cory Black and Billy Bowden

- Northern Districts won the toss and elected to field.
- Play on Day 1 was restricted to 30 overs due to rain.
- Matt Gibson (Auckland) made his first-class debut.
- Points: Auckland 17, Northern Districts 3

=== Round 5 ===
1–4 April 2023
Scorecard

Central Districts	v	Auckland
296/9d (83 overs); Josh Clarkson 79 (67); Ryan Harrison 2/26 (8 overs)		161/1d (50 overs); William O'Donnell 76* (152); Jayden Lennox 1/27 (14 overs)
156/5d (22 overs); Jack Boyle 47 (46); Will Somerville 3/56 (6 overs)		103 (28.3 overs); George Worker 22 (55); Raymond Toole 7/57 (13.3 overs)

Central Districts won by 188 runs
Saxton Oval, Nelson
Umpires: Tim Parlane and Derek Walker

- Auckland won the toss and elected to field.
- No play was possible on day 1 due to rain and play on Day 3 was restricted to 64 overs due to rain.
- The match was originally scheduled to start on 25 February 2023, but it was rescheduled due to the effects of Cyclone Gabrielle.
- Points: Central Districts 14, Canterbury 4.
