= 2020–21 Plunket Shield season =

Cricket tournament

2020–21 Plunket Shield
- Dates: 19 October 2020 – 6 April 2021
- Cricket format: First-class
- Tournament format: Round-robin
- Champions: Canterbury (20th title)
- Participants: 6
- Matches: 24
- Most runs: Joe Carter (590)
- Most wickets: Will Williams (31)

The 2020–21 Plunket Shield was the 95th season of the Plunket Shield, the domestic first-class cricket competition in New Zealand. It started on 19 October 2020 and finished on 6 April 2021.

On 15 June 2020, New Zealand Cricket announced the first round of contracts for domestic teams ahead of the 2020–21 season. The full schedule for the tournament was confirmed on 8 October 2020.

The season started on 19 October 2020, with the opening two matches affected by the weather, with them both ending early during the tea break on the first day. In the match between Auckland and Otago, Auckland's Ben Lister became the first COVID-19 replacement in a cricket match. Lister replaced Mark Chapman, who reported feeling unwell, inline with the updated International Cricket Council (ICC) playing conditions for a substitute due to COVID.

Canterbury won the tournament with two rounds of matches to play, winning their first title since the 2016–17 season.

== Points table ==
Team	Pld	W	L	D	Ab	Pts
Canterbury	8	5	0	3	0	109
Northern Districts	8	3	2	3	0	69
Otago	8	2	4	2	0	63
Auckland	8	2	0	5	1	61
Central Districts	8	2	4	1	1	56
Wellington	8	0	4	4	0	37

Champions

== Fixtures ==
=== Round 1 ===
19–22 October 2020
Scorecard

Northern Districts	v	Central Districts
253/8d (65 overs); Jeet Raval 68 (115); Brad Schmulian 3/16 (6 overs)		0/0f (0 overs)
0/0f (0 overs)		254/3 (66.3 overs); George Worker 96 (173); Neil Wagner 3/65 (17 overs)

Central Districts won by 7 wickets
Seddon Park, Hamilton
Umpires: Billy Bowden and John Dempsey

- Central Districts won the toss and elected to field.
- Only 41.3 overs were bowled on the first three days due to rain.
- After rain washed out most of the match, both teams agreed to forfeit an innings in an attempt to produce a result.
- Points: Central Districts 15, Northern District 2

19–22 October 2020
Scorecard

Wellington	v	Canterbury
65 (34.1 overs); Devon Conway 31 (86); Matt Henry 4/22 (15.1 overs)		156 (86.3 overs); Chad Bowes 34 (111); Hamish Bennett 4/28 (18.3 overs)
212 (80.5 overs); Devon Conway 81 (152); Will Williams 4/35 (18.5 overs)		126/2 (29.5 overs); Tom Latham 86 (95); Rachin Ravindra 2/32 (3.5 overs)

Canterbury won by 8 wickets
Basin Reserve, Wellington
Umpires: Chris Brown and Ashley Mehrotra

- Canterbury won the toss and elected to field.
- Only 19.1 overs were bowled on day 1 due to rain.
- Points: Canterbury 16, Wellington 4

20–23 October 2020
Scorecard

Otago	v	Auckland
186 (53.5 overs); Michael Rippon 106 (127); Kyle Jamieson 5/39 (12.5 overs)		369/9d (125 overs); Ben Horne 162 (236); Jacob Duffy 3/60 (28 overs)
54 (26.4 overs); Anaru Kitchen 30 (73); Sean Solia 5/8 (5.4 overs)

Auckland won by an innings and 129 runs
Eden Park Outer Oval, Auckland
Umpires: Wayne Knights and Tim Parlane

- Auckland won the toss and elected to field.
- Ollie Pringle (Auckland) made his first-class debut.
- In the first innings of the match, Ben Lister replaced Mark Chapman as a COVID-19 substitute in Auckland's squad.
- Points: Auckland 18, Otago 3

=== Round 2 ===
28–31 October 2020
Scorecard

Northern Districts	v	Otago
335 (95 overs); Joe Carter 146* (251); Jacob Duffy 4/52 (20 overs)		179 (51.2 overs); Michael Rippon 44 (45); Tim Southee 5/42 (14 overs)
264/7d (62 overs); Henry Cooper 85 (163); Michael Rae 3/102 (18 overs)		330 (113.1 overs); Camden Hawkins 90 (211); Ish Sodhi 4/89 (31 overs)

Northern Districts won by 90 runs
Bay Oval, Mount Maunganui
Umpires: Billy Bowden and Wayne Knights

- Northern Districts won the toss and elected to bat.
- Points: Northern Districts 19, Otago 4.

28–31 October 2020
Scorecard

Auckland	v	Central Districts
167 (67.5 overs); Mark Chapman 54 (93); Doug Bracewell 3/18 (16 overs)		150 (50 overs); George Worker 53 (163); Kyle Jamieson 5/41 (17 overs)
269 (95 overs); Glenn Phillips 66 (79); Raymond Toole 4/38 (18 overs)		261 (79.1 overs); Doug Bracewell 102 (137); Sean Solia 4/41 (14.1 overs)

Auckland won by 25 runs
Eden Park Outer Oval, Auckland
Umpires: Chris Brown and John Dempsey

- Auckland won the toss and elected to bat.
- Joey Field (Central Districts) made his first-class debut.
- George Worker (Central Districts) played in his 100th first-class match.
- Kyle Jamieson (Auckland) took a hat-trick.
- Points: Auckland 16, Central Districts 4.

28–31 October 2020
Scorecard

Wellington	v	Canterbury
115 (44.3 overs); Devon Conway 27 (49); Fraser Sheat 5/25 (12.3 overs)		410/6d (117 overs); Daryl Mitchell 103 (243); Iain McPeake 3/74 (32 overs)
276 (93.5 overs); Jamie Gibson 116* (216); Will Williams 5/58 (26 overs)

Canterbury won by an innings and 19 runs
Hagley Oval, Christchurch
Umpires: Tim Parlane and Derek Walker

- Canterbury won the toss and elected to field.
- Fraser Sheat (Canterbury) took his first five-wicket haul in first-class cricket.
- Jamie Gibson (Wellington) scored his maiden century in first-class cricket.
- Will Williams (Canterbury) took his first five-wicket haul in first-class cricket.
- Points: Canterbury 20, Wellington 2.

=== Round 3 ===
5–8 November 2020
Scorecard

Central Districts	v	Auckland

Match abandoned
Saxton Oval, Nelson
Umpires: Wayne Knights and Derek Walker

- No play was possible due to rain.
- Points: Auckland 4, Central Districts 4.

5–8 November 2020
Scorecard

Otago	v	Wellington
265 (80.3 overs); Dale Phillips 65 (82); Ben Sears 4/46 (12.3 overs)		205 (88.4 overs); Michael Bracewell 37 (83); Jacob Duffy 4/52 (28 overs)
218/3d (57.4 overs); Dale Phillips 83* (151); Hamish Bennett 1/12 (8 overs)		194 (59.5 overs); Tom Blundell 101 (147); Jacob Duffy 4/69 (19.5 overs)

Otago won by 84 runs
Basin Reserve, Wellington
Umpires: Chris Brown and Shaun Haig

- Wellington won the toss and elected to field.
- Tom Blundell (Wellington) was given out obstructing the field.
- Points: Otago 18, Wellington 5.

5–8 November 2020
Scorecard

Canterbury	v	Northern Districts
266 (90.5 overs); Leo Carter 50 (59); Scott Kuggeleijn 2/57 (23 overs)		113 (59 overs); Katene Clarke 25 (54); Will Williams 5/26 (18 overs)
		121 (43.5 overs) (f/o); Henry Cooper 22 (86); Fraser Sheat 5/31 (16 overs)

Canterbury won by an innings and 32 runs
Mainpower Oval, Rangiora
Umpires: Tim Parlane and John Bromley

- Canterbury won the toss and elected to bat.
- Sean Davey (Canterbury) made his first-class debut.
- Points: Canterbury 18, Northern Districts 4.

=== Round 4 ===
14–17 November 2020
Scorecard

Northern Districts	v	Central Districts
347 (133.5 overs); BJ Watling 77 (214); Seth Rance 5/64 (26.5 overs)		281/8d (94 overs); Brad Schmulian 49 (87); Tim Southee 3/50 (21 overs)
233/7d (69 overs); Jeet Raval 63 (119); Raymond Toole 3/42 (17 overs)		259 (67.4 overs); Will Young 110* (182); Tim Southee 4/53 (15 overs)

Northern Districts won by 40 runs
Saxton Oval, Nelson
Umpires: Chris Brown and Kim Cotton

- Northern Districts won the toss and elected to bat.
- Points: Northern Districts 17, Central Districts 4.

14–17 November 2020
Scorecard

Auckland	v	Wellington
279 (85.1 overs); Mark Chapman 95 (125); Iain McPeake 4/53 (19.1 overs)		446 (149.3 overs); Devon Conway 157 (325); Kyle Jamieson 5/85 (31 overs)
297/5 (116 overs); Graeme Beghin 108 (238); Michael Snedden 2/52 (22 overs)

Match drawn
Basin Reserve, Wellington
Umpires: Wayne Knights and Ashley Mehrotra

- Wellington won the toss and elected to field.
- Points: Wellington 7, Auckland 3.

14–17 November 2020
Scorecard

Otago	v	Canterbury
168 (56 overs); Nick Kelly 50 (102); Edward Nuttall 3/42 (16 overs)		499/7d (141 overs); Ken McClure 165 (322); Nathan Smith 2/72 (22 overs)
337/9 (153 overs); Hamish Rutherford 72 (207); Daryl Mitchell 5/44 (28 overs)

Match drawn
Molyneux Park, Alexandra
Umpires: Shaun Haig and Derek Walker

- Otago won the toss and elected to bat.
- Daryl Mitchell (Canterbury) took his first five-wicket haul in first-class cricket.
- Points: Canterbury 8, Otago 1.

=== Round 5 ===
11–14 March 2021
Scorecard

Central Districts	v	Wellington
175 (70 overs); Dane Cleaver 63 (94); Michael Snedden 3/37 (10 overs)		104 (45.3 overs); Devon Conway 27 (42); Seth Rance 4/47 (14 overs)
245/9d (60.2 overs); Ajaz Patel 52 (66); Luke Georgeson 3/39 (11 overs)		256 (90 overs); Michael Bracewell 56 (89); Blair Tickner 4/73 (19 overs)

Central Districts won by 60 runs
McLean Park, Napier
Umpires: Ashley Mehrotra and Derek Walker

- Wellington won the toss and elected to field.
- No play was possible on day 1 due to rain.
- Luke Georgeson (Wellington) made his first-class debut.

11–14 March 2021
Scorecard

Auckland	v	Northern Districts
141 (48.1 overs); Mark Chapman 57 (70); Scott Kuggeleijn 7/45 (11.1 overs)		281/8d (68 overs); Jeet Raval 91 (176); Louis Delport 7/88 (17 overs)
141/2 (65.4 overs); William O'Donnell 51* (200); Ish Sodhi 2/39 (21 overs)

Match drawn
Cobham Oval, Whangārei
Umpires: Billy Bowden and John Dempsey

- Northern Districts won the toss and elected to field.
- No play was possible on days 1 and 3 due to rain.
- Ross ter Braak (Auckland) made his first-class debut.
- Louis Delport (Auckland) took a hat-trick.

11–14 March 2021
Scorecard

Canterbury	v	Otago
517 (112.5 overs); Leo Carter 169 (163); Travis Muller 5/131 (24.5 overs)		375/6d (126 overs); Nick Kelly 62 (153); Will Williams 2/43 (26 overs)
209/5d (35.3 overs); Tom Latham 106 (82); Michael Rippon 3/60 (12.3 overs)		163 (63 overs); Anaru Kitchen 45 (93); Matt Henry 3/42 (15 overs)

Canterbury won by 188 runs
Mainpower Oval, Rangiora
Umpires: John Bromley and Tim Parlane

- Otago won the toss and elected to field.

=== Round 6 ===
18–21 March 2021
Scorecard

Northern Districts	v	Wellington
246 (80.4 overs); Jeet Raval 42 (80); Ben Sears 4/55 (16 overs)		395 (147.2 overs); Troy Johnson 114 (271); Neil Wagner 4/58 (23 overs)
379/5d (112 overs); Joe Carter 103* (222); Michael Bracewell 4/133 (41 overs)		108/5 (47 overs); Jakob Bhula 55 (110); Joe Walker 2/19 (17 overs)

Match drawn
Bay Oval, Mount Maunganui
Umpires: Cory Black and Derek Walker

- Northern Districts won the toss and elected to bat.
- Troy Johnson (Wellington) scored his maiden century in first-class cricket.

18–21 March 2021
Scorecard

Auckland	v	Otago
351/8d (95.2 overs); Robert O'Donnell 128 (199); Michael Rae 4/89 (27 overs)		259/5 (80.5 overs); Hamish Rutherford 63 (121); Glenn Phillips 2/33 (10.5 overs)

Match drawn
Queens Park, Invercargill
Umpires: Garth Stirrat and John Bromley

- Auckland won the toss and elected to bat.
- No play was possible on day 4 due to rain.
- Angus McKenzie (Otago) and Cole Briggs (Auckland) both made their first-class debuts.

19–22 March 2021
Scorecard

Central Districts	v	Canterbury
149 (75.1 overs); Doug Bracewell 52 (119); Sean Davey 5/19 (16.1 overs)		281 (81.3 overs); Cam Fletcher 78 (133); Blair Tickner 4/89 (21.3 overs)
170 (83 overs); Dane Cleaver 60 (153); Theo van Woerkom 4/26 (18 overs)		39/1 (10.5 overs); Chad Bowes 25* (27); Blair Tickner 1/22 (5 overs)

Canterbury won by 9 wickets
Hagley Oval, Christchurch
Umpires: Ashley Mehrotra and Tim Parlane

- Central Districts won the toss and elected to bat.
- Jayden Lennox (Central Districts) made his first-class debut.

=== Round 7 ===
26–29 March 2021
Scorecard

Otago	v	Central Districts
393 (120.2 overs); Dale Phillips 149 (257); Raymond Toole 3/77 (23.2 overs)		353/9d (96.2 overs); Brad Schmulian 127 (212); Michael Rae 5/62 (23 overs)
292/7d (70 overs); Hamish Rutherford 111 (128); Blair Tickner 3/64 (20 overs)		288 (66.3 overs); Tom Bruce 81* (76); Michael Rippon 6/66 (16.3 overs)

Otago won by 44 runs
University Oval, Dunedin
Umpires: Derek Walker and Eugene Sanders

- Otago won the toss and elected to bat.
- Michael Rae (Otago) took a hat-trick.

27–30 March 2021
Scorecard

Auckland	v	Canterbury
235 (86.4 overs); Robert O'Donnell 93 (156); Sean Davey 4/45 (19 overs)		131 (58.4 overs); Ken McClure 28 (73); Louis Delport 3/11 (12 overs)
317/3d (98 overs); Robert O'Donnell 107* (202); Ed Nuttall 1/50 (11 overs)		192/4 (89 overs); Cole McConchie 72 (166); Ross ter Braak 1/26 (15 overs)

Match drawn
Eden Park Outer Oval, Auckland
Umpires: Billy Bowden and Garth Stirrat

- Auckland won the toss and elected to bat.
- Harry Chamberlain (Canterbury) and Ryan Harrison (Auckland) both made their first-class debuts.

27–30 March 2021
Scorecard

Wellington	v	Northern Districts
414/4d (127 overs); Rachin Ravindra 138 (212); Joe Walker 2/68 (25 overs)		97/4d (45 overs); Bharat Popli 50 (117); Iain McPeake 2/14 (13 overs)

Match drawn
Basin Reserve, Wellington
Umpires: John Bromley and Tim Parlane

- Northern Districts won the toss and elected to field.
- No play was possible on days 3 and 4 due to rain.
- Matthew Fisher (Northern Districts) made his first-class debut.

=== Round 8 ===
3–6 April 2021
Scorecard

Wellington	v	Auckland
342 (125.5 overs); Tom Blundell 113 (226); William Somerville 4/61 (39.5 overs)		368 (123.5 overs); Robert O'Donnell 142 (268); Rachin Ravindra 3/47 (13 overs)
298/7d (61.3 overs); Michael Bracewell 119 (93); Louis Delport 2/55 (9.3 overs)		267/7 (71 overs); William O'Donnell 137* (210); Rachin Ravindra 3/77 (21 overs)

Match drawn
Eden Park Outer Oval, Auckland
Umpires: Wayne Knights and Tim Parlane

- Wellington won the toss and elected to bat.

3–6 April 2021
Scorecard

Central Districts	v	Canterbury
207 (90.1 overs); Ben Smith 111* (210); Will Williams 3/38 (22 overs)		391 (143.1 overs); Harry Chamberlain 132 (267); Blair Tickner 5/80 (34.1 overs)
299/5 (114 overs); George Worker 64 (129); Fraser Sheat 1/26 (16 overs)

Match drawn
McLean Park, Napier
Umpires: Billy Bowden and John Dempsey

- Canterbury won the toss and elected to field.

3–6 April 2021
Scorecard

Otago	v	Northern Districts
272 (85.5 overs); Hamish Rutherford 54 (106); James Baker 3/35 (15.5 overs)		220 (64 overs); Joe Carter 40 (101); Michael Rae 4/55 (16 overs)
266 (104.3 overs); Nick Kelly 94 (199); James Baker 5/55 (27.3 overs)		317/7 (115.4 overs); Jeet Raval 161* (341); Michael Rippon 4/117 (35.4 overs)

Northern Districts won by 3 wickets
University Oval, Dunedin
Umpires: John Bromley and Shaun Haig

- Northern Districts won the toss and elected to field.
