= 2020–21 Super Smash (men's cricket) =

Cricket tournament

2020–21 Men's Super Smash
- Dates: 24 December 2020 – 13 February 2021
- Administrator: New Zealand Cricket
- Cricket format: Twenty20 cricket
- Tournament format(s): Round-robin and knockout
- Champions: Wellington Firebirds (4th title)
- Participants: 6
- Matches: 32
- Most runs: Finn Allen (512)
- Most wickets: Blair Tickner (17)
- Official website: Super Smash

The 2020–21 Dream11 Super Smash (named after the competition's sponsor Dream11) was the sixteenth season of the Men's Super Smash Twenty20 cricket tournament played in New Zealand. It started on 24 December 2020, and finished on 13 February 2021. The Wellington Firebirds were the defending champions.

On 15 June 2020, New Zealand Cricket announced the first round of contracts for domestic teams ahead of the 2020–21 season. The full schedule for the tournament was confirmed on 29 September 2020.

The Wellington Firebirds topped the group, advancing directly to the final. By the end of January 2021, the Canterbury Kings had secured their place in the Preliminary Final. On 5 February 2021, the Central Stags became the third and final team to reach the knock-out stage of the tournament, advancing to the Preliminary Final. In the Preliminary Final, the Canterbury Kings beat the Central Stags by four wickets to join the Wellington Firebirds in the final. In the final, the Wellington Firebirds beat the Canterbury Kings by five wickets to win the tournament.

== Points table ==
Pos	Team	Pld	W	L	NR	Pts	NRR
1	Wellington Firebirds	10	9	1	0	36	1.516
2	Central Stags	10	6	4	0	24	0.587
3	Canterbury Kings	10	6	4	0	24	0.079
4	Northern Knights	10	5	5	0	20	−0.435
5	Auckland Aces	10	2	8	0	8	−0.376
6	Otago Volts	10	2	8	0	8	−1.449

Source: Cricinfo

Advanced to the Final Advanced to the Preliminary Final

== Fixtures ==
=== Round-robin ===
24 December 2020
13:40
Scorecard

Auckland Aces; 176/3 (20 overs)	v	Wellington Firebirds; 178/6 (19.1 overs)
Sean Solia 75 (56); Peter Younghusband 1/25 (4 overs)		Finn Allen 53 (23); William Somerville 2/34 (4 overs)

Wellington Firebirds won by 4 wickets
Basin Reserve, Wellington
Umpires: Billy Bowden and Kim Cotton

- Wellington Firebirds won the toss and elected to field.
- Michael Snedden (Wellington Firebirds), Ollie Pringle, Ryan Harrison and William O'Donnell (Auckland Aces) all made their T20 debuts.

27 December 2020
19:10 (N)
Scorecard

Wellington Firebirds; 175/7 (20 overs)	v	Central Stags; 136/9 (20 overs)
Devon Conway 67 (51); Blair Tickner 2/30 (4 overs)		Josh Clarkson 30 (30); Hamish Bennett 2/20 (4 overs)

Wellington Firebirds won by 39 runs
McLean Park, Napier
Umpires: Billy Bowden and Garth Stirrat

- Central Stags won the toss and elected to field.
- Joey Field (Central Stags) made his T20 debut.
- Josh Clarkson (Central Stags) played in his 50th T20 match.

28 December 2020
16:00 (D/N)
Scorecard

Otago Volts; 219/7 (20 overs)	v	Auckland Aces; 174 (19.5 overs)
Llew Johnson 72 (44); Danru Ferns 3/43 (4 overs)		Ben Horne 63 (35); Matthew Bacon 3/18 (3.5 overs)

Otago Volts won by 45 runs
Molyneux Park, Alexandra
Umpires: John Bromley and Kannan Jagannathan

- Auckland Aces won the toss and elected to field.

29 December 2020
16:00 (D/N)
Scorecard

Canterbury Kings; 185/4 (20 overs)	v	Otago Volts; 124 (18.4 overs)
Chad Bowes 72 (48); Michael Rippon 1/22 (4 overs)		Neil Broom 41 (28); Edward Nuttall 3/18 (4 overs)

Canterbury Kings won by 61 runs
Molyneux Park, Alexandra
Umpires: John Bromley and Kannan Jagannathan

- Canterbury Kings won the toss and elected to bat.
- Matthew Hay (Canterbury Kings) made his T20 debut.

30 December 2020
13:40
Scorecard

Central Stags; 223/6 (20 overs)	v	Northern Knights; 178/9 (20 overs)
George Worker 71 (42); Joe Walker 2/30 (4 overs)		Anton Devcich 102 (49); Kieran Noema-Barnett 3/37 (4 overs)

Central Stags won by 45 runs
Pukekura Park, New Plymouth
Umpires: John Dempsey and Ashley Mehrotra

- Central Stags won the toss and elected to bat.
- Katene Clarke and Henry Cooper (Northern Knights) both made their T20 debuts.
- Anton Devcich (Northern Knights) scored his first century in T20 cricket.

31 December 2020
13:40
Scorecard

Central Stags; 226/8 (20 overs)	v	Auckland Aces; 156 (18.4 overs)
George Worker 79 (46); Ben Lister 3/21 (4 overs)		Glenn Phillips 42 (22); Blair Tickner 2/23 (3 overs)

Central Stags won by 70 runs
Pukekura Park, New Plymouth
Umpires: John Dempsey and Kim Cotton

- Central Stags won the toss and elected to bat.

1 January 2021
19:10 (N)
Scorecard

Northern Knights; 148/6 (20 overs)	v	Wellington Firebirds; 152/1 (16 overs)
Tim Seifert 46 (46); James Neesham 2/23 (4 overs)		Finn Allen 91* (50); Scott Kuggeleijn 1/21 (4 overs)

Wellington Firebirds won by 9 wickets
Bay Oval, Mount Maunganui
Umpires: Damian Morrow and Tim Parlane

- Wellington Firebirds won the toss and elected to field.
- Freddy Walker (Northern Knights) made his T20 debut.

2 January 2021
19:10 (N)
Scorecard

Northern Knights; 153/7 (20 overs)	v	Otago Volts; 156/8 (19.4 overs)
Tim Seifert 74 (58); Matthew Bacon 3/35 (4 overs)		Hamish Rutherford 49 (28); Zak Gibson 3/17 (4 overs)

Otago Volts won by 2 wickets
Bay Oval, Mount Maunganui
Umpires: Garth Stirrat and Tim Parlane

- Otago Volts won the toss and elected to field.

3 January 2021
15:00
Scorecard

Auckland Aces; 52/4 (5 overs)	v	Canterbury Kings; 55/0 (4.3 overs)
Mark Chapman 25 (13); Edward Nuttall 1/9 (1 over); Will Williams 1/9 (1 over)		Chad Bowes 39* (14)

Canterbury Kings won by 10 wickets
Eden Park Outer Oval, Auckland
Umpires: John Bromley and Ashley Mehrotra

- Canterbury Kings won the toss and elected to field.
- The match was reduced to five overs per side due to rain.
- Fraser Sheat (Canterbury Kings) made his T20 debut.

4 January 2021
19:10 (N)
Scorecard

Central Stags; 117/9 (20 overs)	v	Northern Knights; 122/4 (17.4 overs)
Christian Leopard 23 (21); Brett Hampton 3/21 (4 overs)		Anton Devcich 35* (22); Jayden Lennox 2/17 (4 overs)

Northern Knights won by 6 wickets
Seddon Park, Hamilton
Umpires: Glen Walklin and John Dempsey

- Northern Knights won the toss and elected to field.
- Jayden Lennox (Central Stags) made his T20 debut.

8 January 2021
15:10
Scorecard

Central Stags; 223/5 (20 overs)	v	Otago Volts; 170/8 (20 overs)
George Worker 106 (58); Mitchell McClenaghan 1/31 (4 overs)		Nick Kelly 75 (54); Ajaz Patel 3/34 (4 overs)

Central Stags won by 53 runs
University Oval, Dunedin
Umpires: Derek Walker and John Bromley

- Otago Volts won the toss and elected to field.
- George Worker (Central Stags) scored his first century in T20 cricket.

9 January 2021
15:10
Scorecard

Wellington Firebirds; 185/7 (20 overs)	v	Northern Knights; 105 (15.2 overs)
Finn Allen 75 (39); Joe Walker 2/25 (4 overs)		Tim Seifert 53 (41); Michael Bracewell 4/28 (3 overs)

Wellington Firebirds won by 80 runs
Basin Reserve, Wellington
Umpires: Billy Bowden and Tim Parlane

- Northern Knights won the toss and elected to field.

10 January 2021
19:10 (N)
Scorecard

Central Stags; 186/5 (20 overs)	v	Canterbury Kings; 168/6 (20 overs)
Will Young 68 (43); Matt Henry 2/32 (4 overs)		Daryl Mitchell 71 (46); Doug Bracewell 3/38 (4 overs)

Central Stags won by 18 runs
Hagley Oval, Christchurch
Umpires: Derek Walker and John Dempsey

- Central Stags won the toss and elected to bat.

11 January 2021
19:10 (N)
Scorecard

Canterbury Kings; 154/6 (20 overs)	v	Auckland Aces; 148/5 (20 overs)
Jack Boyle 44 (34); Ross ter Braak 2/24 (4 overs)		Sean Solia 55 (42); Daryl Mitchell 2/21 (3 overs)

Canterbury Kings won by 6 runs
Hagley Oval, Christchurch
Umpires: Kim Cotton and Lui Els

- Canterbury Kings won the toss and elected to bat.

14 January 2021
15:10
Scorecard

Otago Volts; 167/5 (20 overs)	v	Wellington Firebirds; 168/5 (16.3 overs)
Anaru Kitchen 57* (32); James Neesham 2/38 (4 overs)		Finn Allen 92* (43); Michael Rippon 2/23 (4 overs)

Wellington Firebirds won by 5 wickets
University Oval, Dunedin
Umpires: Chris Brown and Shaun Haig

- Otago Volts won the toss and elected to bat.

15 January 2021
15:20
Scorecard

Northern Knights; 150/7 (20 overs)	v	Canterbury Kings; 152/4 (18.5 overs)
Jeet Raval 70 (55); Todd Astle 2/12 (4 overs)		Daryl Mitchell 69 (47); Freddy Walker 3/20 (3.5 overs)

Canterbury Kings won by 6 wickets
Hagley Oval, Christchurch
Umpires: John Bromley and Tim Parlane

- Northern Knights won the toss and elected to bat.

16 January 2021
11:10
Scorecard

Wellington Firebirds; 154/7 (20 overs)	v	Canterbury Kings; 155/6 (19.4 overs)
James Neesham 49 (38); Cole McConchie 2/14 (4 overs)		Cole McConchie 48* (34); Hamish Bennett 2/29 (4 overs)

Canterbury Kings won by 4 wickets
Hagley Oval, Christchurch
Umpires: John Bromley and Tim Parlane

- Wellington Firebirds won the toss and elected to bat.

17 January 2021
15:10
Scorecard

Auckland Aces; 140/6 (14 overs)	v	Northern Knights; 109/5 (10.5 overs)
Glenn Phillips 68 (33); Tim Southee 2/30 (3 overs)		Mitchell Santner 39* (16); William Somerville 3/18 (2 overs)

Northern Knights won by 5 wickets (DLS method)
Eden Park Outer Oval, Auckland
Umpires: Chris Brown and Wayne Knights

- Northern Knights won the toss and elected to field.
- Northern Knights were set a revised target of 107 runs from 11 overs due to rain.

18 January 2021
16:00 (D/N)
Scorecard

Otago Volts; 145/9 (17 overs)	v	Central Stags; 158/5 (15.4 overs)
Neil Broom 42 (30); Blair Tickner 3/23 (4 overs)		Ross Taylor 48* (27); Nathan Smith 4/32 (4 overs)

Central Stags won by 5 wickets (DLS method)
Pukekura Park, New Plymouth
Umpires: Eugene Sanders and Shaun Haig

- Central Stags won the toss and elected to field.
- Central Stags were set a revised target of 153 runs from 17 overs due to rain.

21 January 2021
19:10 (N)
Scorecard

Canterbury Kings; 118 (19.1 overs)	v	Northern Knights; 93/2 (10.2 overs)
Todd Astle 36 (22); Anurag Verma 2/21 (4 overs)		Kane Williamson 34* (27); Daryl Mitchell 1/12 (2 overs)

Northern Knights won by 8 wickets (DLS method)
Seddon Park, Hamilton
Umpires: John Dempsey and Shaun Haig

- Northern Knights won the toss and elected to field.
- Northern Knights were set a revised target of 91 runs from 14 overs due to rain.

23 January 2021
15:10
Scorecard

Auckland Aces; 199/6 (20 overs)	v	Central Stags; 182/7 (20 overs)
Mark Chapman 73 (34); Doug Bracewell 2/22 (4 overs)		Tom Bruce 52 (35); Louis Delport 2/28 (4 overs)

Auckland Aces won by 17 runs
Eden Park Outer Oval, Auckland
Umpires: Chris Brown and Wayne Knights

- Central Stags won the toss and elected to field.

24 January 2021
14:40
Scorecard

Otago Volts; 137/9 (20 overs)	v	Wellington Firebirds; 140/6 (18 overs)
Anaru Kitchen 28 (22); Ben Sears 4/21 (4 overs)		Michael Bracewell 47* (43); Mitchell McClenaghan 3/36 (4 overs)

Wellington Firebirds won by 4 wickets
Basin Reserve, Wellington
Umpires: Cory Black and Tim Parlane

- Wellington Firebirds won the toss and elected to field.

25 January 2021
15:10
Scorecard

Canterbury Kings; 153/7 (20 overs)	v	Wellington Firebirds; 154/3 (19.4 overs)
Chad Bowes 44 (29); Ben Sears 3/34 (4 overs)		Tom Blundell 62* (42); Todd Astle 1/22 (3 overs)

Wellington Firebirds won by 7 wickets
Basin Reserve, Wellington
Umpires: Derek Walker and Tim Parlane

- Wellington Firebirds won the toss and elected to field.

29 January 2021
15:20
Scorecard

Auckland Aces; 162/4 (20 overs)	v	Northern Knights; 166/7 (20 overs)
Mark Chapman 69 (41); Tim Southee 2/29 (4 overs)		Kane Williamson 79* (55); Ross ter Braak 3/26 (4 overs)

Northern Knights won by 3 wickets
Seddon Park, Hamilton
Umpires: Billy Bowden and John Dempsey

- Northern Knights won the toss and elected to field.

30 January 2021
19:10 (N)
Scorecard

Otago Volts; 162/5 (20 overs)	v	Canterbury Kings; 163/4 (19 overs)
Neil Broom 48 (37); Todd Astle 2/18 (4 overs)		Cole McConchie 50 (36); Anaru Kitchen 2/38 (4 overs)

Canterbury Kings won by 6 wickets
Hagley Oval, Christchurch
Umpires: Derek Walker and John Bromley

- Canterbury Kings won the toss and elected to field.

31 January 2021
14:40
Scorecard

Central Stags; 164/7 (20 overs)	v	Wellington Firebirds; 170/2 (16.2 overs)
Doug Bracewell 53* (27); Logan van Beek 3/35 (4 overs)		Devon Conway 69* (50); Jayden Lennox 1/15 (3 overs)

Wellington Firebirds won by 8 wickets
Basin Reserve, Wellington
Umpires: Chris Brown and Tim Parlane

- Central Stags won the toss and elected to bat.

1 February 2021
11:20
Scorecard

Auckland Aces; 183/7 (20 overs)	v	Otago Volts; 80 (12.3 overs)
William O Donnell 40 (30); Nathan Smith 2/19 (3 overs)		Nick Kelly 38 (29); Kyle Jamieson 3/18 (3.3 overs)

Auckland Aces won by 103 runs
Eden Park Outer Oval, Auckland
Umpires: Billy Bowden and Derek Walker

- Auckland Aces won the toss and elected to bat.

5 February 2021
19:10 (N)
Scorecard

Central Stags; 183/6 (20 overs)	v	Canterbury Kings; 153/7 (20 overs)
Ross Taylor 65 (36); Matt Henry 1/32 (4 overs)		Cam Fletcher 39* (21); Jayden Lennox 3/20 (4 overs)

Central Stags won by 30 runs
McLean Park, Napier
Umpires: Chris Brown and John Dempsey

- Canterbury Kings won the toss and elected to field.

6 February 2021
15:10
Scorecard

Northern Knights; 191/6 (20 overs)	v	Otago Volts; 155 (18.5 overs)
Anton Devcich 75* (40); Anaru Kitchen 1/5 (1 over)		Neil Broom 47 (34); Tim Southee 3/41 (4 overs)

Northern Knights won by 36 runs
University Oval, Dunedin
Umpires: Derek Walker and John Bromley

- Northern Knights won the toss and elected to bat.

7 February 2021
11:20
Scorecard

Wellington Firebirds; 230/2 (20 overs)	v	Auckland Aces; 191 (20 overs)
Devon Conway 91* (58); Sean Solia 1/23 (4 overs)		William O'Donnell 38 (24); James Neesham 3/41 (4 overs)

Wellington Firebirds won by 39 runs
Eden Park Outer Oval, Auckland
Umpires: Billy Bowden and Damian Morrow

- Wellington Firebirds won the toss and elected to bat.

=== Finals ===
Preliminary Final
11 February 2021
Scorecard

Central Stags; 180/7 (20 overs)	v	Canterbury Kings; 181/6 (19.5 overs)
Will Young 101 (47); Daryl Mitchell 2/28 (3 overs)		Daryl Mitchell 88 (58); Blair Tickner 2/38 (4 overs)

Canterbury Kings won by 4 wickets
Eden Park Outer Oval, Auckland
Umpires: Billy Bowden and John Dempsey

- Central Stags won the toss and elected to bat.

Final
13 February 2021
Scorecard

Canterbury Kings; 175/8 (20 overs)	v	Wellington Firebirds; 178/5 (19.4 overs)
Cole McConchie 44 (39); Logan van Beek 3/28 (4 overs)		Devon Conway 93* (63); Edward Nuttall 2/32 (4 overs)

Wellington Firebirds won by 5 wickets
Basin Reserve, Wellington
Umpires: Chris Brown and Wayne Knights

- Wellington Firebirds won the toss and elected to field.
