= 2025–26 Super Smash (men's cricket) =

2025–26 Men's Super Smash
- Dates: 26 December 2025 – 31 January 2026
- Administrator: New Zealand Cricket
- Cricket format: Twenty20
- Tournament format(s): Double round-robin and Finals
- Champions: Northern Brave (5th title)
- Runners-up: Canterbury Kings
- Participants: 6
- Matches: 32
- Player of the series: Katene Clarke (Northern Brave)
- Most runs: Katene Clarke (431)
- Most wickets: Scott Kuggeleijn (17)
- Official website: Super Smash

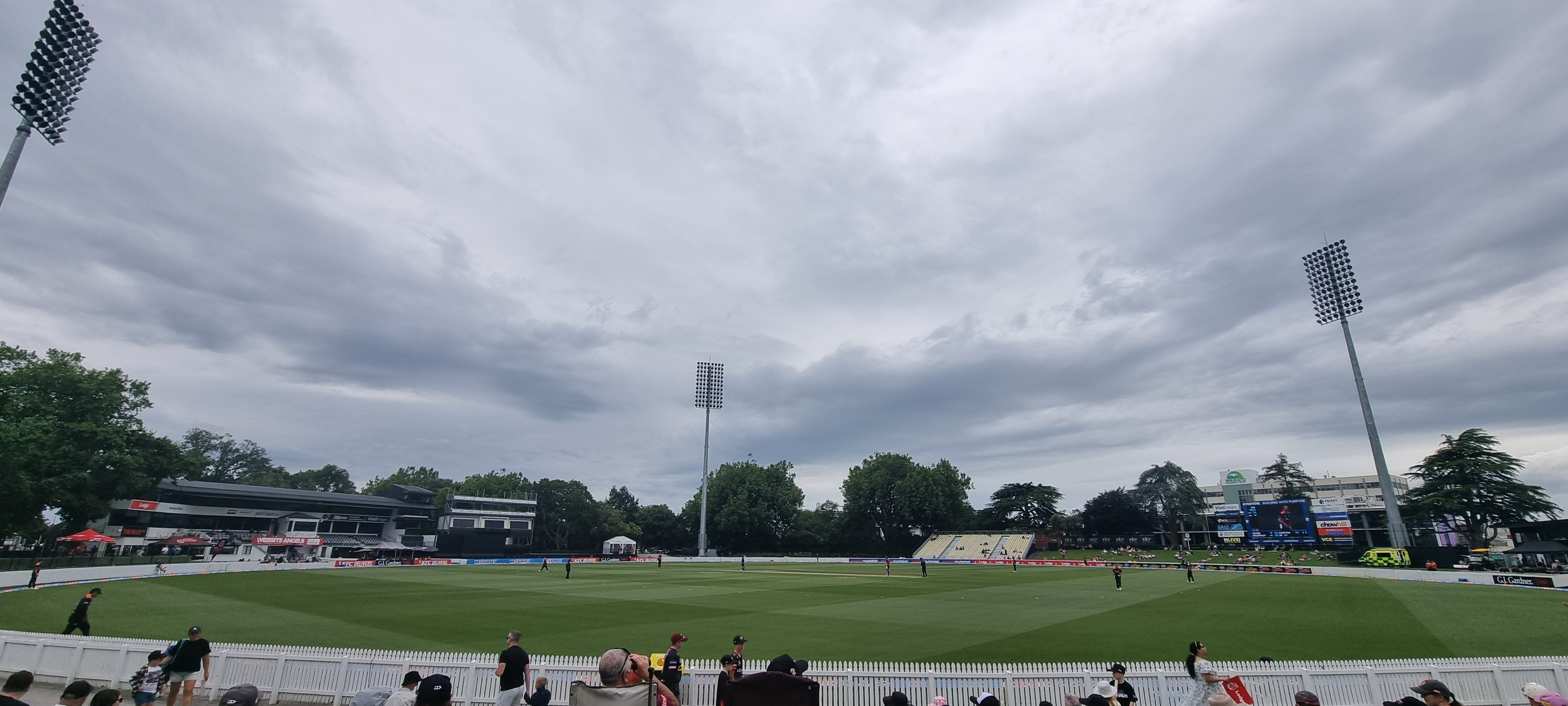
Match between Northern Districts and Auckland on 26 December at Seddon Park, Hamilton.

The 2025–26 Super Smash was the 21st season of the men's Super Smash Twenty20 cricket competition played in New Zealand that is taking place from 26 December 2025 to 31 January 2026. The Central Stags were the defending champions coming into the tournament.

The tournament will run alongside the 2025–26 Women's Super Smash.

Northern Brave won their fifth title defeating Canterbury Kings in the final by 5 wickets.

Plans were established to create a new domestic franchise league called the NZ20. New Zealand Cricket has not yet approved the NZ20, but if they do, this edition is the final New Zealand Super Smash tournament.

== Competition format ==
Teams played in a double round-robin in a group of six, playing 10 matches each. Matches were played using a Twenty20 format. The top team in the group advanced straight to the final, while the second- and third-placed teams played off in an elimination final.

The group worked on a points system with positions being based on the total points. Points were awarded as follows:

Results	Points
Win	4 points
Tie	2 points
No result	2 points
Loss	0 points

== Teams and standings ==
=== Points table ===
Pos	Team	Pld	W	L	T	NR	Pts	NRR	Qualification
1	Northern Brave	10	5	1	1	3	28	1.977	Advance to Grand Final
2	Auckland Aces	10	5	3	0	2	24	0.491	Advance to Elimination Final
3	Canterbury Kings	10	4	4	0	2	20	−0.864	Advance to Elimination Final
4	Central Stags	10	4	5	0	1	18	−0.600	
5	Otago Volts	10	3	5	1	1	16	−0.622	
6	Wellington Firebirds	10	3	6	0	1	14	0.031	

Source: Super Smash, ESPNcricinfo.

=== Points summary ===
Team	Group matches										Play-offs	
Team	1	2	3	4	5	6	7	8	9	10	EF	F
Auckland Aces	2	6	8	12	12	16	20	20	20	24	L	
Canterbury Kings	4	8	12	12	16	16	16	18	18	20	W	L
Central Stags	4	4	4	4	8	8	12	14	18	18		
Northern Brave	2	2	4	8	12	16	20	22	26	28	→	W
Otago Volts	0	4	6	6	10	10	14	14	16	16		
Wellington Firebirds	0	0	4	6	6	6	6	6	10	14		

Win	Loss	Tie	No result	Eliminated

- Note: The total points at the end of each group match are listed.
- Note: Click on the points or results to see the match summary.

== League stage ==
Match 1
26 December 2025
14:10
Scorecard

Auckland Aces; 201/8 (20 overs)	v	Northern Brave
Bevon Jacobs 55 (31); Zak Gibson 2/25 (3 overs)

No result
Seddon Park, Hamilton
Umpires: Chris Brown and Stu Martin

- Northern Brave won the toss and elected to field.
- No further play was possible due to rain.
- Xavier Bell (Northern Brave) made his T20 debut.

Match 2
27 December 2025
16:25 (D/N)
Scorecard

Central Stags; 188/7 (20 overs)	v	Wellington Firebirds; 142 (17.5 overs)
Dane Cleaver 95 (53); Ben Sears 3/34 (4 overs)		Tom Blundell 51 (28); Ajaz Patel 4/21 (4 overs)

Central Stags won by 46 runs
Fitzherbert Park, Palmerston North
Umpires: Kim Cotton and Vinit Mahna
Player of the match: Dane Cleaver (Central Stags)

- Wellington Firebirds won the toss and elected to field.
- Yahya Zeb (Wellington Firebirds) made his T20 debut.
- Logan van Beek (Wellington Firebirds) took his 200th wicket in T20s.

Match 3
28 December 2025
16:25 (D/N)
Scorecard

Canterbury Kings; 188/5 (20 overs)	v	Otago Volts; 160 (20 overs)
Tom Latham 75 (48); Glenn Phillips 2/29 (4 overs)		Jamal Todd 53 (24); Cameron Paul 3/32 (4 overs)

Canterbury Kings won by 28 runs
Molyneux Park, Alexandra
Umpires: Shaun Haig and Greg Pennell
Player of the match: Tom Latham (Canterbury Kings)

- Otago Volts won the toss and elected to field.
- Cameron Paul (Canterbury Kings) made his T20 debut.

Match 4
29 December 2025
16:25 (D/N)
Scorecard

Wellington Firebirds; 187/7 (20 overs)	v	Auckland Aces; 189/5 (19.2 overs)
Jesse Tashkoff 83 (39); Harjot Johal 3/32 (4 overs)		Bevon Jacobs 54 (30); Nick Greenwood 2/20 (2 overs)

Auckland Aces won by 5 wickets
Basin Reserve, Wellington
Umpires: Cory Black and Glen Walklin
Player of the match: Harjot Johal (Auckland Aces)

- Wellington Firebirds won the toss and elected to bat.
- Harjot Johal (Auckland Aces) made his T20 debut.

Match 5
30 December 2025
16:25 (D/N)
Scorecard

Otago Volts; 193/7 (20 overs)	v	Central Stags; 152/8 (20 overs)
Glenn Phillips 90* (48); Ajaz Patel 2/30 (4 overs)		Will Young 40 (19); Luke Georgeson 4/23 (4 overs)

Otago Volts won by 41 runs
Molyneux Park, Alexandra
Umpires: Shaun Haig and Pete Pasco
Player of the match: Glenn Phillips (Otago Volts)

- Otago Volts won the toss and elected to bat.

Match 6
31 December 2025
16:25 (D/N)
Scorecard

Wellington Firebirds; 194/3 (20 overs)	v	Northern Brave; 181 (19.4 overs)
Nick Kelly 95* (58); Scott Kuggeleijn 1/17 (3 overs)		Brett Hampton 47 (32); Yahya Zeb 3/29 (3.4 overs)

Wellington Firebirds won by 13 runs
Bay Oval, Mount Maunganui
Umpires: Billy Bowden and Stu Martin
Player of the match: Nick Kelly (Wellington Firebirds)

- Northern Brave won the toss and elected to field.
- Joshua Brown (Northern Brave) made his T20 debut.

Match 7
1 January 2026
17:55 (D/N)
Scorecard

Canterbury Kings; 194/7 (20 overs)	v	Central Stags; 158/8 (20 overs)
Chad Bowes 63 (37); Jayden Lennox 3/29 (3 overs)		Dean Foxcroft 57 (41); Cameron Paul 2/12 (2 overs)

Canterbury Kings won by 36 runs
Hagley Oval, Christchurch
Umpires: Regan Dalley and Kannan Jagannathan
Player of the match: Chad Bowes (Canterbury Kings)

- Central Stags won the toss and elected to field.

Match 8
2 January 2026
16:25 (D/N)
Scorecard

Wellington Firebirds	v	Auckland Aces

No result
Eden Park Outer Oval, Auckland
Umpires: Chris Brown and Brad Wilson

- Wellington Firebirds won the toss and elected to bat.
- No play was possible due to rain.

Match 9
3 January 2026
16:25 (D/N)
Scorecard

Central Stags; 139/6 (20 overs)	v	Canterbury Kings; 145/1 (12.4 overs)
Josh Clarkson 42* (42); Fraser Sheat 3/17 (4 overs)		Matt Boyle 73* (30); Toby Findlay 1/24 (2.4 overs)

Canterbury Kings won by 9 wickets
Saxton Oval, Nelson
Umpires: Tyron Davies and John Dempsey
Player of the match: Fraser Sheat (Canterbury Kings)

- Central Stags won the toss and elected to bat.

Match 10
4 January 2026
17:55 (D/N)
Scorecard

Otago Volts; 166/6 (20 overs)	v	Northern Brave; 166/6 (20 overs)
Max Chu 64* (42); Tim Pringle 2/25 (4 overs)		Brett Hampton 35 (30); Ben Lockrose 2/24 (4 overs)

Match tied
Bay Oval, Mount Maunganui
Umpires: Billy Bowden and Damian Morrow
Player of the match: Max Chu (Otago Volts)

- Northern Brave won the toss and elected to field.

Match 11
6 January 2026
12:40
Scorecard

Auckland Aces; 200/6 (20 overs)	v	Otago Volts; 112 (15.1 overs)
Dale Phillips 77 (36); Ben Lockrose 3/42 (4 overs)		Jack Boyle 40 (25); Harjot Johal 4/21 (3 overs)

Auckland Aces won by 88 runs
Eden Park Outer Oval, Auckland
Umpires: John Dempsey and Craig Pryor
Player of the match: Dale Phillips (Auckland Aces)

- Otago Volts won the toss and elected to field.
- Jacob Cumming (Otago Volts) and Luke Watson (Auckland Aces) both made their T20 debuts.

Match 12
7 January 2026
16:25 (D/N)
Scorecard

Central Stags; 197/3 (20 overs)	v	Wellington Firebirds; 195/7 (20 overs)
Dane Cleaver 67 (45); Michael Snedden 1/42 (4 overs)		Tom Blundell 63 (37); Angus Schaw 2/22 (4 overs)

Central Stags won by 2 runs
Basin Reserve, Wellington
Umpires: Kim Cotton and Tyron Davies
Player of the match: Angus Schaw (Central Stags)

- Central Stags won the toss and elected to bat.

Match 13
8 January 2026
14:10
Scorecard

Northern Brave; 240/4 (20 overs)	v	Canterbury Kings; 153/9 (20 overs)
Katene Clarke 97 (58); Cole McConchie 2/32 (3 overs)		LLB Harper 42 (27); Matthew Fisher 3/27 (4 overs)

Northern Brave won by 87 runs
Seddon Park, Hamilton
Umpires: Billy Bowden and Stu Martin
Player of the match: Katene Clarke (Northern Brave)

- Canterbury Kings won the toss and elected to field.
- LLB Harper (Canterbury Kings) made his T20 debut.

Match 14
9 January 2026
16:25 (D/N)
Scorecard

Wellington Firebirds; 150/7 (20 overs)	v	Otago Volts; 152/4 (19.1 overs)
Rachin Ravindra 26 (19); Jake Gibson 2/23 (4 overs)		Jack Boyle 71 (47); Logan van Beek 1/27 (3 overs)

Otago Volts won by 6 wickets
Basin Reserve, Wellington
Umpires: Chris Brown and Kannan Jagannathan
Player of the match: Jack Boyle (Otago Volts)

- Wellington Firebirds won the toss and elected to bat.
- Zac Cumming (Otago Volts) made his T20 debut.

Match 15
10 January 2026
17:55 (D/N)
Scorecard

Canterbury Kings; 216/6 (20 overs)	v	Auckland Aces; 199/4 (20 overs)
Tom Latham 55 (32); Angus Olliver 2/44 (4 overs); Ryan Harrison 2/44 (4 overs)		Bevon Jacobs 88* (45); Cameron Paul 2/28 (4 overs)

Canterbury Kings won by 17 runs
Hagley Oval, Christchurch
Umpires: Regan Dalley and John Dempsey
Player of the match: LLB Harper (Canterbury Kings)

- Canterbury Kings won the toss and elected to field.

Match 16
11 January 2026
16:25 (D/N)
Scorecard

Wellington Firebirds; 185/7 (20 overs)	v	Northern Brave; 189/4 (16.2 overs)
Tom Blundell 73 (41); Scott Kuggeleijn 3/28 (4 overs)		Brett Hampton 65 (31); Ben Sears 3/44 (4 overs)

Northern Brave won by 6 wickets
Basin Reserve, Wellington
Umpires: Kannan Jagannathan and Craig Pryor
Player of the match: Brett Hampton (Northern Brave)

- Northern Brave won the toss and elected to field.

Match 17
12 January 2026
16:25 (D/N)
Scorecard

Otago Volts; 159 (20 overs)	v	Auckland Aces; 161/5 (18.4 overs)
Llew Johnson 63 (44); Angus Olliver 2/27 (4 overs)		Bevon Jacobs 78* (51); Troy Johnson 2/20 (3 overs)

Auckland Aces won by 5 wickets
University of Otago Oval, Dunedin
Umpires: Pete Pasco and Greg Pennell
Player of the match: Bevon Jacobs (Auckland Aces)

- Auckland Aces won the toss and elected to field.

Match 18
13 January 2026
17:55 (D/N)
Scorecard

Central Stags; 146/5 (20 overs)	v	Northern Brave; 120/4 (13.5 overs)
Sam Cassidy 49 (29); Matthew Fisher 3/19 (4 overs)		Katene Clarke 60* (37); Joey Field 2/22 (3 overs)

Northern Brave won by 6 wickets (DLS method)
McLean Park, Napier
Umpires: Billy Bowden and Damian Morrow
Player of the match: Katene Clarke (Northern Brave)

- Northern Brave won the toss and elected to field.
- Northern Brave were set a revised target of 120 runs from 15 overs due to rain.

Match 19
14 January 2026
12:40
Scorecard

Canterbury Kings; 132 (20 overs)	v	Auckland Aces; 136/1 (10.1 overs)
Leo Carter 39 (32); Rohit Gulati 2/16 (4 overs)		Dale Phillips 55* (32); Cole McConchie 1/27 (2 overs)

Auckland Aces won by 9 wickets
Eden Park Outer Oval, Auckland
Umpires: Wayne Knights and Stu Martin
Player of the match: Rohit Gulati (Auckland Aces)

- Canterbury Kings won the toss and elected to bat.
- Jesse Frew (Canterbury Kings) made his T20 debut.

Match 20
15 January 2026
16:25 (D/N)
Scorecard

Wellington Firebirds; 132/7 (16 overs)	v	Otago Volts; 136/5 (15.4 overs)
Tom Blundell 47 (35); Ben Lockrose 2/24 (4 overs)		Jacob Cumming 45 (33); James Hartshorn 3/17 (4 overs)

Otago Volts won by 5 wickets
University of Otago Oval, Dunedin
Umpires: Kim Cotton and Kannan Jagannathan
Player of the match: Jacob Cumming (Otago Volts)

- Otago Volts won the toss and elected to field.
- The match was reduced to 16 overs per side due to rain.
- Oscar Jackson (Wellington Firebirds) made his T20 debut.

Match 21
16 January 2026
17:55 (D/N)
Scorecard

Central Stags; 142/7 (20 overs)	v	Auckland Aces; 132/8 (20 overs)
Dean Foxcroft 56 (41); Siddhesh Dixit 3/20 (4 overs)		Bevon Jacobs 33 (30); Ajaz Patel 2/20 (4 overs)

Central Stags won by 10 runs
McLean Park, Napier
Umpires: Chris Brown and Brad Wilson
Player of the match: Ajaz Patel (Central Stags)

- Auckland Aces won the toss and elected to field.
- A Jones (Auckland Aces) made his T20 debut.

Match 22
18 January 2026
16:25 (D/N)
Scorecard

Northern Brave; 231/3 (20 overs)	v	Otago Volts; 200/8 (20 overs)
Katene Clarke 100* (54); Troy Johnson 1/18 (2 overs)		Troy Johnson 66 (34); Scott Kuggeleijn 3/24 (3 overs)

Northern Brave won by 31 runs
University of Otago Oval, Dunedin
Umpires: James Blunt and Kannan Jagannathan
Player of the match: Katene Clarke (Northern Brave)

- Otago Volts won the toss and elected to field.

Match 23
19 January 2026
16:25 (D/N)
Scorecard

Wellington Firebirds; 193/6 (20 overs)	v	Canterbury Kings; 105 (16.2 overs)
Sam Morgan 55 (33); Sean Davey 2/31 (4 overs)		Matt Boyle 22 (15); Logan van Beek 3/14 (2.2 overs)

Wellington Firebirds won by 88 runs
Basin Reserve, Wellington
Umpires: Kim Cotton and Neil Louw

- Canterbury Kings won the toss and elected to field.
- Sam Morgan (Wellington Firebirds) made his T20 debut.

Match 24
20 January 2026
17:55 (D/N)
Scorecard

Northern Brave	v	Central Stags

Match abandoned
Seddon Park, Hamilton
Umpires: Billy Bowden and Wayne Knights

- No toss.
- No play was possible due to rain.

Match 25
21 January 2026
17:55 (D/N)
Scorecard

Canterbury Kings	v	Otago Volts

Match abandoned
Hagley Oval, Christchurch
Umpires: Kim Cotton and Christelle High

- No toss.
- No play was possible due to rain.

Match 26
22 January 2026
16:25 (D/N)
Scorecard

Northern Brave; 217/8 (20 overs)	v	Auckland Aces; 110 (14.3 overs)
Robert O'Donnell 56 (33); Ryan Harrison 3/30 (4 overs)		Cam Fletcher 32* (20); Scott Kuggeleijn 4/26 (3 overs)

Northern Brave won by 107 runs
Eden Park Outer Oval, Auckland
Umpires: Chris Brown and Billy Bowden
Player of the match: Robert O'Donnell (Northern Brave)

- Auckland Aces won the toss and elected to field.

Match 27
23 January 2026
17:55 (D/N)
Scorecard

Wellington Firebirds; 178/5 (20 overs)	v	Canterbury Kings; 138/8 (16 overs)
Sam Morgan 71 (40); LLB Harper 4/17 (4 overs)		Henry Nicholls 41 (28); Ben Sears 4/25 (4 overs)

Wellington Firebirds won by 13 runs (DLS method)
Hagley Oval, Christchurch
Umpires: John Dempsey and Kannan Jagannathan
Player of the match: Ben Sears (Wellington Firebirds)

- Wellington Firebirds won the toss and elected to bat.
- Canterbury Kings were set a revised target of 150 runs from 16 overs due to rain.

Match 28
24 January 2026
17:55 (D/N)
Scorecard

Otago Volts; 133 (18 overs)	v	Central Stags; 134/4 (19.3 overs)
Jack Boyle 28 (14); Blair Tickner 4/23 (4 overs)		Will Young 62 (41); Jake Gibson 2/18 (4 overs)

Central Stags won by 6 wickets
McLean Park, Napier
Umpires: Greg Pennell and Glen Walklin
Player of the match: Blair Tickner (Central Stags)

- Otago Volts won the toss and elected to bat.
- Harry Sixton (Otago Volts) made his T20 debut.

Match 29
25 January 2026
16:25 (D/N)
Scorecard

Northern Brave; 124/4 (14.2 overs)	v	Canterbury Kings
Robert O'Donnell 42 (28); Fraser Sheat 1/7 (2 overs)

No result
Hagley Oval, Christchurch
Umpires: Billy Bowden and Pete Pasco

- Canterbury Kings won the toss and elected to field.
- No further play was possible due to rain.

Match 30
26 January 2026
16:25 (D/N)
Scorecard

Auckland Aces; 219/5 (19 overs)	v	Central Stags; 210/4 (19 overs)
Lachlan Stackpole 66 (36); Brett Randell 2/52 (4 overs)		Tom Bruce 95 (50); Angus Olliver 2/46 (4 overs)

Auckland Aces won by 8 runs
Eden Park Outer Oval, Auckland
Umpires: Wayne Knights and Greg Pennell
Player of the match: Lachlan Stackpole (Auckland Aces)

- Central Stags won the toss and elected to field.
- The match was reduced to 19 overs per side due to rain.
- Central Stags were set a revised target of 219 from 19 overs due to rain.

== Finals ==
Elimination Final			Grand Final
			1	Northern Brave	173/5 (17.5 overs)
2	Auckland Aces	106 (18.4 overs)	EW	Canterbury Kings	171/5 (20 overs)
3	Canterbury Kings	108/1 (10.3 overs)

=== Elimination Final ===
Elimination Final
30 January 2026
17:55 (D/N)
Scorecard

Auckland Aces; 106 (18.4 overs)	v	Canterbury Kings; 108/1 (10.3 overs)
Ryan Harrison 30 (35); Fraser Sheat 3/13 (3.4 overs)		Chad Bowes 59* (31); Ryan Harrison 1/20 (3 overs)

Canterbury Kings won by 9 wickets
Hagley Oval, Christchurch
Umpires: Kim Cotton and Greg Pennell
Player of the match: (Canterbury Kings)

- Auckland Aces won the toss and elected to bat.

=== Grand Final ===
Grand Final
31 January 2026
17:55 (D/N)
Scorecard

Canterbury Kings; 171/5 (20 overs)	v	Northern Brave; 173/5 (17.5 overs)
Mitchell Hay 56* (34); Brett Hampton 3/37 (4 overs)		Brett Hampton 55 (26); Michael Rae 3/37 (4 overs)

Northern Brave won by 5 wickets
Hagley Oval, Christchurch
Umpires: Billy Bowden and Kannan Jagannathan
Player of the match: Brett Hampton (Northern Brave)

- Northern Brave won the toss and elected to field.
