= 2021–22 Super Smash (men's cricket) =

Cricket tournament

2021–22 Men's Super Smash
- Dates: 26 November 2021 – 29 January 2022
- Administrator: New Zealand Cricket
- Cricket format: Twenty20 cricket
- Tournament format(s): Round-robin and knockout
- Champions: Northern Brave (3rd title)
- Participants: 6
- Matches: 32
- Most runs: Michael Bracewell (478)
- Most wickets: Henry Shipley (18)
- Official website: Super Smash

The 2021–22 Dream11 Men's Super Smash (named after the competition's sponsor Dream11) was the seventeenth season of the men's Super Smash Twenty20 cricket tournament that was played in New Zealand. In July 2021, New Zealand Cricket (NZC) named all the squads for the domestic teams ahead of the 2021–22 season, and confirmed that the matches would mainly be played at the weekend. On 27 October 2021, NZC confirmed the full fixtures for the tournament. The Wellington Firebirds were the defending champions.

Prior to the tournament, the Northern Districts T20 team, previously known as the Northern Knights, was rebranded as the Northern Brave. Northern Brave finished top of the group stage to secure a place in the final of the tournament at their home ground of Seddon Park in Hamilton. The Canterbury Kings and the Wellington Firebirds both qualified for the elimination final. In the elimination match, the Canterbury Kings beat the Wellington Firebirds by six wickets to advance to the final. The Northern Brave won the tournament, beating the Canterbury Kings by 56 runs in the final.

== Points table ==
Pos	Team	Pld	W	L	NR	Pts	NRR
1	Northern Brave	10	8	1	1	34	0.602
2	Canterbury Kings	10	7	3	0	28	0.899
3	Wellington Firebirds	10	5	5	0	20	0.157
4	Central Stags	10	4	6	0	16	−0.175
5	Auckland Aces	10	4	6	0	16	−0.551
6	Otago Volts	10	1	8	1	6	−1.006

Source: ESPN Cricinfo

Advances to the Final
Advances to the Eliminator

== Fixtures ==
=== Round-robin ===
26 November 2021
Scorecard

Wellington Firebirds; 177/7 (20 overs)	v	Canterbury Kings; 150/9 (20 overs)
Finn Allen 57 (30); Edward Nuttall 3/31 (4 overs)		Jack Boyle 31 (25); Michael Bracewell 3/22 (4 overs)

Wellington Firebirds won by 27 runs
Hagley Oval, Christchurch
Umpires: Kim Cotton and Tim Parlane

- Canterbury Kings won the toss and elected to field.
- Tim Robinson (Wellington Firebirds) made his T20 debut.

28 November 2021
Scorecard

Otago Volts; 184/4 (20 overs)	v	Central Stags; 185/5 (19 overs)
Hamish Rutherford 82 (47); Jayden Lennox 1/23 (3 overs)		Dane Cleaver 114* (54); Matthew Bacon 2/27 (4 overs)

Central Stags won by 5 wickets
University of Otago Oval, Dunedin
Umpires: Shaun Haig and Kannan Jagannathan

- Otago Volts won the toss and elected to bat.
- Jake Gibson (Otago Volts) made his T20 debut.

3 December 2021
Scorecard

Northern Brave; 106/6 (13 overs)	v	Otago Volts
Jeet Raval 33 (18); Michael Rippon 3/32 (4 overs)

No result
Seddon Park, Hamilton
Umpires: Chris Brown and Damian Morrow

- Otago Volts won the toss and elected to field.
- Rain prevented any further play.

5 December 2021
Scorecard

Central Stags; 190/4 (20 overs)	v	Wellington Firebirds; 176/7 (20 overs)
Josh Clarkson 71* (32); Ben Sears 1/27 (3 overs)		Logan van Beek 61* (33); Seth Rance 2/23 (4 overs)

Central Stags won by 14 runs
Basin Reserve, Wellington
Umpires: Cory Black and Shaun Haig

- Wellington Firebirds won the toss and elected to field.

10 December 2021
Scorecard

Canterbury Kings; 172/8 (20 overs)	v	Central Stags; 125 (20 overs)
Cole McConchie 84 (54); Doug Bracewell 2/24 (4 overs)		Josh Clarkson 25 (11); Matt Henry 3/11 (4 overs)

Canterbury Kings won by 47 runs
Hagley Oval, Christchurch
Umpires: Chris Brown and Pete Pasco

- Canterbury Kings won the toss and elected to bat.
- Mitchell Hay (Canterbury Kings) made his T20 debut.

12 December 2021
Scorecard

Northern Brave; 146/8 (20 overs)	v	Otago Volts; 151/7 (19.4 overs)
Katene Clarke 49 (57); Josh Finnie 2/22 (4 overs)		Neil Broom 62 (53); Matthew Fisher 2/21 (4 overs)

Otago Volts won by 3 wickets
University of Otago Oval, Dunedin
Umpires: Derek Walker and Cory Black

- Otago Volts won the toss and elected to field.
- Angus McKenzie (Otago Volts) made his T20 debut.

17 December 2021
Scorecard

Auckland Aces; 165 (19.5 overs)	v	Northern Brave; 167/6 (17.5 overs)
Martin Guptill 47 (31); Joe Walker 4/31 (4 overs)		Joe Carter 75* (53); Lockie Ferguson 2/25 (3 overs)

Northern Brave won by 4 wickets
Seddon Park, Hamilton
Umpires: John Dempsey and Tim Parlane

- Northern Brave won the toss and elected to field.
- Adithya Ashok and Cole Briggs (Auckland Aces) both made their T20 debuts.

18 December 2021
Scorecard

Central Stags; 180/4 (20 overs)	v	Otago Volts; 127 (16.5 overs)
Greg Hay 76 (55); Hamish Rutherford 1/6 (1 over)		Llew Johnson 38 (23); Seth Rance 5/19 (3.5 overs)

Central Stags won by 53 runs
McLean Park, Napier
Umpires: Billy Bowden and Wayne Knights

- Otago Volts won the toss and elected to field.
- Seth Rance (Central Stags) took his first five-wicket haul in T20 cricket.

19 December 2021
Scorecard

Wellington Firebirds; 151/9 (20 overs)	v	Canterbury Kings; 157/4 (16.3 overs)
Tim Robinson 32 (26); Edward Nuttall 3/28 (4 overs)		Chad Bowes 62 (41); Logan van Beek 2/20 (3 overs)

Canterbury Kings won by 6 wickets
Basin Reserve, Wellington
Umpires: Shaun Haig and Eugene Sanders

- Wellington Firebirds won the toss and elected to bat.

20 December 2021 (Note: Originally the match was scheduled to be played on 27 November 2021.)
Scorecard

Auckland Aces; 92 (17.2 overs)	v	Northern Brave; 93/4 (15.1 overs)
Lockie Ferguson 26 (24); Freddy Walker 3/10 (2.2 overs)		Tim Seifert 38* (42); Sean Solia 2/16 (3 overs)

Northern Brave won by 6 wickets
Eden Park Outer Oval, Auckland
Umpires: Billy Bowden and Wayne Knights

- Northern Brave won the toss and elected to field.

23 December 2021
Scorecard

Canterbury Kings; 107 (17.2 overs)	v	Northern Brave; 108/9 (20 overs)
Henry Nicholls 35 (21); Joe Walker 3/13 (4 overs)		Katene Clarke 32* (12); Ed Nuttall 3/43 (4 overs)

Northern Brave won by 1 wicket
Bay Oval, Mount Maunganui
Umpires: Wayne Knights and Damien Morrow

- Northern Brave won the toss and elected to field.

24 December 2021
Scorecard

Auckland Aces; 134/9 (20 overs)	v	Wellington Firebirds; 121/8 (20 overs)
Mark Chapman 55 (48); Ben Sears 3/22 (4 overs)		Michael Bracewell 58* (46); Adithya Ashok 3/8 (4 overs)

Auckland Aces won by 13 runs
Basin Reserve, Wellington
Umpires: John Dempsey and Kannan Jagannathan

- Auckland Aces won the toss and elected to bat.

26 December 2021
Scorecard

Canterbury Kings; 173/6 (20 overs)	v	Otago Volts; 137/8 (20 overs)
Chad Bowes 50 (32); Angus McKenzie 2/28 (4 overs)		Hamish Rutherford 62 (48); Henry Shipley 2/17 (3 overs)

Canterbury Kings won by 36 runs
Hagley Oval, Christchurch
Umpires: Kim Cotton and Tim Parlane

- Canterbury Kings won the toss and elected to bat.

27 December 2021
Scorecard

Central Stags; 168/5 (20 overs)	v	Auckland Aces; 170/6 (20 overs)
Greg Hay 57 (45); Lockie Ferguson 2/24 (4 overs)		Martin Guptill 79* (58); Blair Tickner 3/40 (4 overs)

Auckland Aces won by 4 wickets
Fitzherbert Park, Palmerston North
Umpires: Billy Bowden and Chris Brown

- Central Stags won the toss and elected to bat.

28 December 2021
Scorecard

Otago Volts; 166/7 (20 overs)	v	Wellington Firebirds; 170/5 (19.2 overs)
Anaru Kitchen 54 (34); James Neesham 2/17 (3 overs)		Tim Robinson 65 (49); Michael Rippon 2/24 (4 overs)

Wellington Firebirds won by 5 wickets
Queenstown Events Centre, Queenstown
Umpires: Shaun Haig and Derek Walker

- Otago Volts won the toss and elected to bat.

29 December 2021
Scorecard

Otago Volts; 129/9 (20 overs)	v	Auckland Aces; 130/2 (17.1 overs)
Nick Kelly 58 (39); Lockie Ferguson 4/19 (4 overs)		Mark Chapman 55 (42); Beckham Wheeler-Greenall 1/15 (2 overs)

Auckland Aces won by 8 wickets
Queenstown Events Centre, Queenstown
Umpires: Shaun Haig and Pete Pasco

- Otago Volts won the toss and elected to bat.
- Beckham Wheeler-Greenall (Otago Volts) made his T20 debut.

30 December 2021
Scorecard

Central Stags; 145/8 (20 overs)	v	Northern Brave; 147/4 (17.4 overs)
Dane Cleaver 65 (42); Scott Kuggeleijn 3/22 (3 overs)		Jeet Raval 66* (46); Joey Field 2/28 (4 overs)

Northern Brave won by 6 wickets
Pukekura Park, New Plymouth
Umpires: Billy Bowden and Glen Walklin

- Northern Brave won the toss and elected to field.

31 December 2021
Scorecard

Central Districts; 217/4 (20 overs)	v	Canterbury Kings; 221/5 (17.2 overs)
Tom Bruce 93* (36); Will Williams 2/28 (3 overs)		Leo Carter 56 (35); Joey Field 2/37 (2.2 overs)

Canterbury Kings won by 5 wickets
Pukekura Park, New Plymouth
Umpires: John Bromley and Eugene Sanders

- Central Districts won the toss and elected to bat.
- Ma'ara Ave (Central Districts) made his T20 debut.

6 January 2022
Scorecard

Otago Volts; 157/5 (20 overs)	v	Wellington Firebirds; 119/2 (13.1 overs)
Josh Tasman-Jones 35 (24); Peter Younghusband 2/19 (4 overs)		Finn Allen 68 (32); Anaru Kitchen 1/22 (2 overs)

Wellington Firebirds won by 8 wickets (DLS method)
Basin Reserve, Wellington
Umpires: Derek Walker and Glen Walklin

- Otago Volts won the toss and elected to bat.
- Wellington Firebirds were set a revised target of 117 runs from 15 overs due to rain.
- Jakob Bhula (Wellington Firebirds) made his T20 debut.

7 January 2022
Scorecard

Auckland Aces; 167/8 (20 overs)	v	Canterbury Kings; 172/5 (17.5 overs)
Glenn Phillips 53 (27); Henry Shipley 2/26 (3 overs)		Cam Fletcher 57* (39); Lockie Ferguson 2/39 (3.5 overs)

Canterbury Kings won by 5 wickets
Eden Park Outer Oval, Auckland
Umpires: John Dempsey and Pete Pasco

- Canterbury Kings won the toss and elected to field.
- William O'Rourke (Canterbury Kings) made his T20 debut.

8 January 2022
Scorecard

Central Stags; 227/4 (20 overs)	v	Wellington Firebirds; 228/8 (19.5 overs)
Josh Clarkson 76* (38); Ben Sears 2/35 (4 overs)		Michael Bracewell 141* (65); Doug Bracewell 3/33 (4 overs)

Wellington Firebirds won by 2 wickets
Pukekura Park, New Plymouth
Umpires: Billy Bowden and Kim Cotton

- Wellington Firebirds won the toss and elected to field.
- Mason Hughes (Central Stags) made his T20 debut.
- Michael Bracewell (Wellington Firebirds) made the highest score in a T20 match in New Zealand.

14 January 2022
Scorecard

Northern Brave; 176/7 (20 overs)	v	Central Stags; 157/8 (20 overs)
Colin de Grandhomme 86 (45); Blair Tickner 3/20 (4 overs)		Ben Smith 68 (53); Mitchell Santner 2/25 (4 overs)

Northern Brave won by 19 runs
Bay Oval, Mount Maunganui
Umpires: Derek Walker and Tim Parlane

- Central Stags won the toss and elected to field.

15 January 2022
Scorecard

Otago Volts; 130 (19.4 overs)	v	Auckland Aces; 133/9 (19.4 overs)
Neil Broom 32 (17); Glenn Phillips 2/11 (2 overs)		Sean Solia 67* (54); Anaru Kitchen 4/11 (4 overs)

Auckland Aces won by 1 wicket
Eden Park Outer Oval, Auckland
Umpires: John Bromley and John Dempsey

- Otago Volts won the toss and elected to bat.

16 January 2022
Scorecard

Wellington Firebirds; 104 (18.3 overs)	v	Northern Brave; 105/4 (19 overs)
James Neesham 20 (21); Anurag Verma 3/25 (3.3 overs)		Colin de Grandhomme 41* (46); Rachin Ravindra 2/16 (4 overs)

Northern Brave won by 6 wickets
Cobham Oval, Whangārei
Umpires: Billy Bowden and Glen Walklin

- Wellington Firebirds won the toss and elected to bat.

18 January 2022 (Note: Originally the match was scheduled to be played on 4 December 2021.)
Scorecard

Canterbury Kings; 154 (19.5 overs)	v	Auckland Aces; 136/7 (20 overs)
Tom Latham 34 (19); Adithya Ashok 3/33 (4 overs)		Robert O'Donnell 56 (37); Henry Shipley 3/14 (4 overs)

Canterbury Kings won by 18 runs
Hagley Oval, Christchurch
Umpires: Tim Parlane and Wayne Knights

- Auckland Aces won the toss and elected to field.

20 January 2022 (Note: Originally the match was scheduled to be played on 11 December 2021.)
Scorecard

Auckland Aces; 121/9 (20 overs)	v	Wellington Firebirds; 122/2 (14.1 overs)
Glenn Phillips 39 (31); Hamish Bennett 3/15 (4 overs)		Michael Bracewell 54* (44); Will Somerville 1/20 (3.1 overs)

Wellington Firebirds won by 8 wickets
Eden Park Outer Oval, Auckland
Umpires: Cory Black and John Bromley

- Auckland Aces won the toss and elected to bat.

21 January 2022
Scorecard

Canterbury Kings; 173/6 (20 overs)	v	Northern Brave; 174/2 (19.1 overs)
Chad Bowes 58 (40); Mitchell Santner 2/34 (4 overs)		Tim Seifert 88* (62); Henry Shipley 1/28 (3 overs)

Northern Brave won by 8 wickets
Hagley Oval, Christchurch
Umpires: Shaun Haig and Tim Parlane

- Northern Brave won the toss and elected to field.

22 January 2022
Scorecard

Central Stags; 176/7 (20 overs)	v	Auckland Aces; 166/7 (20 overs)
Ben Smith 80 (49); Adithya Ashok 3/28 (4 overs)		Robert O'Donnell 68 (37); Seth Rance 2/15 (4 overs)

Central Stags won by 10 runs
Eden Park, Auckland (Note: First Super Smash match to be held at the main ground of Eden Park since the 2012–13 season.)
Umpires: John Dempsey and Wayne Knights

- Auckland Aces won the toss and elected to field.

23 January 2022
Scorecard

Otago Volts; 185/8 (20 overs)	v	Canterbury Kings; 186/2 (17.1 overs)
Dale Phillips 65 (34); Henry Shipley 4/23 (4 overs)		Daryl Mitchell 68* (39); Michael Rae 1/38 (4 overs)

Canterbury Kings won by 8 wickets
University of Otago Oval, Dunedin
Umpires: Kim Cotton and Shaun Haig

- Otago Volts won the toss and elected to bat.

24 January 2022
Scorecard

Wellington Firebirds; 167 (19.4 overs)	v	Northern Brave; 168/8 (19.3 overs)
Finn Allen 64 (28); Tim Southee 3/20 (3.4 overs)		Mitchell Santner 59 (35); James Neesham 2/18 (3 overs)

Northern Brave won by 2 wickets
Basin Reserve, Wellington
Umpires: Cory Black and Tim Parlane

- Northern Brave won the toss and elected to field.

== Finals ==
Elimination final			Final
			1	Northern Brave	217/5
2	Canterbury Kings	191/4	2	Canterbury Kings	161
3	Wellington Firebirds	190/3

Elimination Final
27 January 2022
Scorecard

Wellington Firebirds; 190/3 (20 overs)	v	Canterbury Kings; 191/4 (19.3 overs)
Michael Bracewell 81 (54); Matt Henry 2/47 (4 overs)		Cam Fletcher 63* (25); Peter Younghusband 2/20 (3.3 overs)

Canterbury Kings won by 6 wickets
University of Otago Oval, Dunedin
Umpires: Billy Bowden and Shaun Haig

- Canterbury Kings won the toss and elected to field.

Final
29 January 2022
Scorecard

Northern Brave; 217/5 (20 overs)	v	Canterbury Kings; 161 (18.5 overs)
Mitchell Santner 92* (40); Henry Shipley 2/30 (4 overs)		Matt Henry 44 (22); Tim Southee 3/39 (3.5 overs)

Northern Brave won by 56 runs
Seddon Park, Hamilton
Umpires: Chris Brown and Wayne Knights

- Canterbury Kings won the toss and elected to field.
