= 2020–21 Ford Trophy =

Cricket tournament

- Dates: 29 November 2020 – 6 March 2021
- Administrator: New Zealand Cricket
- Cricket format: List A cricket
- Tournament format(s): Round-robin and Knockout
- Champions: Canterbury (15th title)
- Participants: 6
- Matches: 32
- Most runs: William O'Donnell (537)
- Most wickets: Will Williams (20)
- Official website: www.blackcaps.co.nz

The 2020–21 Ford Trophy was the 50th season of The Ford Trophy, the List A cricket tournament that was played in New Zealand. It was the tenth in a sponsorship deal between New Zealand Cricket and Ford Motor Company. It started on 29 November 2020 and finished on 6 March 2021. Auckland were the defending champions.

On 15 June 2020, New Zealand Cricket announced the first round of contracts for domestic teams ahead of the 2020–21 season. The full schedule for the tournament was confirmed on 8 October 2020.

Following the conclusion of the group stage, Northern Districts and Wellington progressed to the preliminary final, with Canterbury topping the group and advancing directly to the tournament's final. Northern Districts won the rain-affected preliminary final by 138 runs to join Canterbury in the final of the tournament. In the final, Canterbury beat Northern Districts by eight wickets to win their 15th title.

== Points table ==
Pos	Team	Pld	W	L	NR	Pts	NRR
1	Canterbury	10	7	3	0	31	1.146
2	Northern Districts	10	6	4	0	26	−0.093
3	Wellington	10	5	4	1	22	−0.164
4	Otago	10	5	5	0	20	−0.613
5	Auckland	10	4	6	0	18	−0.233
6	Central Districts	10	2	7	1	12	−0.047

Source: Cricinfo

Advanced to the Final Advanced to the Preliminary Final

== Fixtures ==
=== Round 1 ===
29 November 2020
Scorecard

Auckland; 138/9 (27 overs)	v	Northern Districts; 143/4 (19.3 overs)
Graeme Beghin 47 (67); Brett Randell 5/22 (6 overs)		Katene Clarke 63 (38); Ryan Harrison 2/22 (4.3 overs)

Northern Districts won by 6 wickets (DLS method)
Cobham Oval, Whangārei
Umpires: John Dempsey and Ashley Mehrotra

- Northern Districts won the toss and elected to field.
- Northern Districts were set a revised target of 143 runs from 19.3 overs due to rain.
- Ollie Pringle and Ryan Harrison (Auckland) both made their List A debuts.

29 November 2020
Scorecard

Central Districts; 183/6 (20 overs)	v	Otago; 187/4 (18.2 overs)
Bayley Wiggins 44 (28); Josh Finnie 1/23 (2 overs)		Hamish Rutherford 97 (59); Josh Clarkson 2/31 (4 overs)

Otago won by 6 wickets
Pukekura Park, New Plymouth
Umpires: John Bromley and Garth Stirrat

- Otago won the toss and elected to field.
- The match was reduced to 20 overs per side due to rain.
- Joey Field (Central Districts) made his List A debut.

29 November 2020
Scorecard

Wellington; 119 (34 overs)	v	Canterbury; 123/3 (22.4 overs)
Michael Bracewell 62 (81); Sean Davey 6/30 (10 overs)		Henry Nicholls 43* (40); Jamie Gibson 2/31 (5 overs)

Canterbury won by 7 wickets
Hagley Oval, Christchurch
Umpires: Tim Parlane and Glen Walklin

- Wellington won the toss and elected to bat.
- Sean Davey (Canterbury), James Hartshorn and Troy Johnson (Wellington) all made their List A debuts.
- Sean Davey (Canterbury) took his first five-wicket haul in List A cricket.

=== Round 2 ===
1 December 2020
Scorecard

Auckland; 202/7 (50 overs)	v	Northern Districts; 205/6 (43.2 overs)
William O'Donnell 50 (91); Jake Gibson 3/56 (10 overs)		Bharat Popli 57* (95); Ryan Harrison 2/26 (5.2 overs)

Northern Districts won by 4 wickets
Cobham Oval, Whangārei
Umpires: John Dempsey and Ashley Mehrotra

- Auckland won the toss and elected to bat.
- Ross ter Braak (Auckland) made his List A debut.

1 December 2020
Scorecard

Otago; 212/8 (24 overs)	v	Central Districts; 202/8 (24 overs)
Neil Broom 69 (47); Joey Field 4/42 (5 overs)		George Worker 125 (79); Travis Muller 5/34 (5 overs)

Otago won by 10 runs
Pukekura Park, New Plymouth
Umpires: John Bromley and Garth Stirrat

- Central Districts won the toss and elected to field.
- The match was reduced to 24 overs per side due to rain.
- Jarrod McKay (Central Districts) made his List A debut.
- Travis Muller (Otago) took his first five-wicket haul in List A cricket.

1 December 2020
Scorecard

Canterbury; 236/5 (40 overs)	v	Wellington; 205 (37.3 overs)
Todd Astle 83 (69); Michael Snedden 1/38 (7 overs)		Michael Bracewell 55 (49); Will Williams 3/37 (7.3 overs)

Canterbury won by 31 runs
Rangiora Recreation Ground, Rangiora
Umpires: Tim Parlane and Eugene Sanders

- Wellington won the toss and elected to field.
- The match was reduced to 40 overs per side due to rain.
- Matthew Hay (Canterbury) made his List A debut.

=== Round 3 ===
6 December 2020
Scorecard

Auckland; 246 (48 overs)	v	Otago; 113 (36.3 overs)
William O'Donnell 61 (76); Michael Rae 7/35 (10 overs)		Dale Phillips 41 (61); Ross ter Braak 4/27 (8 overs)

Auckland won by 133 runs
Eden Park Outer Oval, Auckland
Umpires: Billy Bowden and Damian Morrow

- Otago won the toss and elected to field.
- Michael Rae (Otago) took the third-best figures in a domestic List A match in New Zealand.

6 December 2020
Scorecard

Canterbury; 346/8 (50 overs)	v	Northern Districts; 209 (41.5 overs)
Chad Bowes 110 (110); Jake Gibson 3/63 (10 overs)		Dean Brownlie 53 (68); Will Williams 3/26 (8 overs)

Canterbury won by 137 runs
Hagley Oval, Christchurch
Umpires: Derek Walker and Kim Cotton

- Canterbury won the toss and elected to bat.

6 December 2020
Scorecard

Central Districts; 261/9 (50 overs)	v	Wellington; 264/5 (48.2 overs)
Ben Smith 79 (105); Peter Younghusband 3/42 (10 overs)		Jakob Bhula 97* (114); Jayden Lennox 2/28 (10 overs)

Wellington won by 5 wickets
Fitzherbert Park, Palmerston North
Umpires: John Bromley and Garth Stirrat

- Central Districts won the toss and elected to bat.

=== Round 4 ===
8 December 2020
Scorecard

Auckland; 224 (48.3 overs)	v	Otago; 229/4 (43.1 overs)
William O'Donnell 85 (110); Michael Rae 3/65 (9.3 overs)		Neil Broom 68* (73); Louis Delport 2/51 (10 overs)

Otago won by 6 wickets
Eden Park Outer Oval, Auckland
Umpires: Billy Bowden and Damian Morrow

- Otago won the toss and elected to field.

8 December 2020
Scorecard

Canterbury; 266/8 (50 overs)	v	Northern Districts; 267/7 (49.5 overs)
Ken McClure 105 (103); Brett Randell 3/65 (10 overs)		Jeet Raval 105 (122); Will Williams 1/38 (9.5 overs)

Northern Districts won by 3 wickets
Hagley Oval, Christchurch
Umpires: Derek Walker and John Dempsey

- Canterbury won the toss and elected to bat.
- Matthew Fisher (Northern Districts) made his List A debut.

8 December 2020
Scorecard

Central Districts	v	Wellington

Match abandoned
Fitzherbert Park, Palmerston North
Umpires: John Bromley and Garth Stirrat

- No toss.
- No play was possible due to rain.

=== Round 5 ===
13 December 2020
Scorecard

Central Districts; 213 (49 overs)	v	Canterbury; 217/3 (41.3 overs)
Bayley Wiggins 59 (75); Matt Henry 3/28 (10 overs)		Leo Carter 63* (65); Raymond Toole 2/53 (10 overs)

Canterbury won by 7 wickets
Pukekura Park, New Plymouth
Umpires: Ashley Mehrotra and Cory Black

- Canterbury won the toss and elected to field.
- Mitchell Hay (Canterbury) made his List A debut.

13 December 2020
Scorecard

Northern Districts; 323/9 (50 overs)	v	Otago; 283 (47.3 overs)
Henry Cooper 88 (73); Nathan Smith 3/58 (10 overs)		Nathan Smith 81 (69); Anurag Verma 2/40 (9 overs)

Northern Districts won by 40 runs
University Oval, Dunedin
Umpires: John Bromley and Kannan Jagannathan

- Otago won the toss and elected to field.

13 December 2020
Scorecard

Auckland; 255/9 (50 overs)	v	Wellington; 256/6 (48.3 overs)
William O'Donnell 62 (79); Peter Younghusband 3/57 (10 overs)		Troy Johnson 80* (89); Ross ter Braak 2/50 (7 overs)

Wellington won by 4 wickets
Eden Park Outer Oval, Auckland
Umpires: Billy Bowden and Damian Morrow

- Wellington won the toss and elected to field.

=== Round 6 ===
15 December 2020
Scorecard

Canterbury; 158 (41.1 overs)	v	Central Districts; 162/4 (31 overs)
Matthew Hay 49 (52); Jayden Lennox 3/30 (9 overs)		Josh Clarkson 56* (46); Will Williams 3/24 (10 overs)

Central Districts won by 6 wickets
Pukekura Park, New Plymouth
Umpires: Ashley Mehrotra and Cory Black

- Central Districts won the toss and elected to field.

15 December 2020
Scorecard

Northern Districts; 243 (50 overs)	v	Otago; 177 (45.2 overs)
Anurag Verma 47* (58); Anaru Kitchen 3/25 (10 overs)		Mitch Renwick 48 (69); Matthew Fisher 4/34 (10 overs)

Northern Districts won by 66 runs
University Oval, Dunedin
Umpires: Tim Parlane and Kannan Jagannathan

- Northern Districts won the toss and elected to bat.

15 December 2020
Scorecard

Wellington; 283/6 (50 overs)	v	Auckland; 284/5 (48 overs)
Troy Johnson 113 (116); Ben Lister 3/56 (10 overs)		William O'Donnell 106 (120); Jakob Bhula 2/28 (5 overs)

Auckland won by 5 wickets
Eden Park Outer Oval, Auckland
Umpires: Billy Bowden and Damian Morrow

- Auckland won the toss and elected to field.
- William O'Donnell (Auckland) and Troy Johnson (Wellington) both scored their first centuries in List A cricket.

=== Round 7 ===
19 February 2021
Scorecard

Northern Districts; 205 (49.1 overs)	v	Wellington; 207/9 (48.3 overs)
Jeet Raval 69 (89); Ollie Newton 3/23 (10 overs)		Fraser Colson 80* (115); Scott Kuggeleijn 4/41 (10 overs)

Wellington won by 1 wicket
Basin Reserve, Wellington
Umpires: Chris Brown and John Bromley

- Wellington won the toss and elected to field.

19 February 2021
Scorecard

Central Districts; 309/7 (50 overs)	v	Auckland; 310/4 (47.1 overs)
Tom Bruce 96* (62); Louis Delport 3/50 (10 overs)		Sean Solia 121 (119); Jayden Lennox 2/48 (10 overs)

Auckland won by 6 wickets
Eden Park Outer Oval, Auckland
Umpires: Wayne Knights and John Dempsey

- Central Districts won the toss and elected to bat.
- Cole Briggs (Auckland) made his List A debut.
- Cole Briggs (Auckland) scored his first century in List A cricket.
- Sean Solia and Cole Briggs set a new partnership record for the first wicket for Auckland, with 226 runs.

19 February 2021
Scorecard

Canterbury; 271 (49.2 overs)	v	Otago; 217 (45.1 overs)
Tom Latham 63 (75); Jacob Duffy 4/53 (10 overs)		Neil Broom 83 (107); Matt Henry 3/34 (10 overs)

Canterbury won by 54 runs
Queenstown Events Centre, Queenstown
Umpires: Shaun Haig and Derek Walker

- Canterbury won the toss and elected to bat.
- Max Chu (Otago) made his List A debut.

=== Round 8 ===
21 February 2021
Scorecard

Wellington; 188 (46.5 overs)	v	Northern Districts; 171 (48.4 overs)
Michael Bracewell 64* (82); Matthew Fisher 3/26 (10 overs)		Jeet Raval 37 (61); Jakob Bhula 3/13 (5.4 overs)

Wellington won by 17 runs
Basin Reserve, Wellington
Umpires: Garth Stirrat and Tim Parlane

- Wellington won the toss and elected to bat.

21 February 2021
Scorecard

Auckland; 311/9 (50 overs)	v	Central Districts; 218 (39.3 overs)
Cole Briggs 99 (104); Jayden Lennox 2/50 (10 overs)		Will Young 79 (75); Ross ter Braak 3/45 (6.3 overs)

Auckland won by 93 runs
Eden Park Outer Oval, Auckland
Umpires: Damian Morrow and John Dempsey

- Auckland won the toss and elected to bat.
- Andrew Morrison (Auckland) made his List A debut.
- Ross Taylor (Central Districts) played in his 300th List A match.

21 February 2021
Scorecard

Otago; 263/9 (50 overs)	v	Canterbury; 232 (48.5 overs)
Michael Rippon 77 (73); Matt Henry 3/37 (10 overs)		Cole McConchie 45 (56); Michael Rae 4/39 (10 overs)

Otago won by 31 runs
Queenstown Events Centre, Queenstown
Umpires: Derek Walker and PJ Pasco

- Otago won the toss and elected to bat.

=== Round 9 ===
26 February 2021
Scorecard

Wellington; 340/8 (50 overs)	v	Otago; 342/4 (49.1 overs)
Michael Bracewell 82 (87); Mitchell McClenaghan 5/73 (9 overs)		Hamish Rutherford 102 (91); Michael Bracewell 2/51 (10 overs)

Otago won by 6 wickets
Basin Reserve, Wellington
Umpires: Cory Black and Tim Parlane

- Otago won the toss and elected to field.

26 February 2021
Scorecard

Northern Districts; 194 (48.3 overs)	v	Central Districts; 196/4 (34.3 overs)
BJ Watling 68 (103); Josh Clarkson 3/30 (10 overs)		Ross Taylor 68* (72); Brett Hampton 2/26 (7 overs)

Central Districts won by 6 wickets
Seddon Park, Hamilton
Umpires: John Dempsey and Damian Morrow

- Central Districts won the toss and elected to field.

26 February 2021
Scorecard

Canterbury; 313/4 (50 overs)	v	Auckland; 97 (26.3 overs)
Henry Nicholls 113 (127); Ross ter Braak 2/59 (8 overs)		Cole Briggs 23 (41); Sean Davey 2/7 (3.3 overs)

Canterbury won by 216 runs
Rangiora Recreation Ground, Rangiora
Umpires: Derek Walker and John Bromley

- Auckland won the toss and elected to field.
- Canterbury's winning margin was the biggest in the history of the Ford Trophy.

=== Round 10 ===
28 February 2021
Scorecard

Wellington; 427/8 (50 overs)	v	Otago; 345 (41.2 overs)
Tom Blundell 151 (140); Mitchell McClenaghan 3/78 (9 overs)		Michael Rippon 84 (68); Logan van Beek 3/48 (8 overs)

Wellington won by 82 runs
Basin Reserve, Wellington
Umpires: Tim Parlane and Garth Stirrat

- Wellington won the toss and elected to bat.
- Wellington's score was the highest ever team total in New Zealand List A cricket.

28 February 2021
Scorecard

Central Districts; 253 (49.1 overs)	v	Northern Districts; 257/5 (47.2 overs)
George Worker 66 (87); Brett Hampton 3/35 (9.1 overs)		Joe Carter 71 (92); Raymond Toole 2/45 (9 overs)

Northern Districts won by 5 wickets
Seddon Park, Hamilton
Umpires: John Dempsey and Damian Morrow

- Northern Districts won the toss and elected to field.

28 February 2021
Scorecard

Canterbury; 238/5 (29 overs)	v	Auckland; 225/8 (29 overs)
Tom Latham 118* (75); Ross ter Braak 2/50 (6 overs)		William O'Donnell 79 (59); Will Williams 2/45 (6 overs)

Canterbury won by 13 runs
Rangiora Recreation Ground, Rangiora
Umpires: Derek Walker and John Bromley

- Canterbury won the toss and elected to bat.
- The match was reduced to 29 overs per side due to rain.

== Finals ==
Elimination Final			Grand Final
			1	Canterbury	292/2 (45 overs)
2	Northern Districts	351/8 (42 overs)	2	Northern Districts	289/7 (50 overs)
3	Wellington	145/7 (26.1 overs)

Preliminary Final
3 March 2021
Scorecard

Northern Districts; 351/8 (42 overs)	v	Wellington; 145/7 (26.1 overs)
Henry Cooper 146* (94); Peter Younghusband 2/56 (6 overs)		Tom Blundell 80* (74); Joe Walker 2/11 (4.1 overs)

Northern Districts won by 138 runs (DLS method)
Seddon Park, Hamilton
Umpires: Billy Bowden and Tim Parlane

- Wellington won the toss and elected to field.
- Wellington were set a revised target of 284 runs from 26.1 overs due to rain.

Final
6 March 2021
Scorecard

Northern Districts; 289/7 (50 overs)	v	Canterbury; 292/2 (45 overs)
Katene Clarke 82 (104); Daryl Mitchell 2/37 (5 overs)		Henry Nicholls 127* (144); Jeet Raval 1/24 (4 overs)

Canterbury won by 8 wickets
Hagley Oval, Christchurch
Umpires: Derek Walker and Tim Parlane

- Northern Districts won the toss and elected to bat.
