= Matthew Hay (cricketer) =

New Zealand cricketer (born 1997)

Personal information
- Born: 16 October 1997 (age 29)
- Source: Cricinfo, 1 December 2020

Matthew Hay (born 16 October 1997) is a New Zealand cricketer. He made his List A debut on 1 December 2020, for Canterbury in the 2020–21 Ford Trophy. He made his Twenty20 debut on 29 December 2020, for Canterbury in the 2020–21 Super Smash.
