= Martin Pringle (cricketer) =

New Zealand cricketer (born 1964)

Personal information
- Full name: Martin Roy Pringle
- Born: 18 August 1964 (age 62); Auckland, New Zealand
- Batting: Right-handed
- Bowling: Right-arm medium
- Relatives: Ollie Pringle (son)

Domestic team information
- Years: Team
- 1984–1993: Auckland
- Source: ESPNcricinfo, 20 October 2020

Martin Roy Pringle (born, 18 August 1964) is a New Zealand cricketer. He was born in Auckland and educated at St Peter's College, Auckland. He played cricket for the Ellerslie Cricket Club.

As a cricketer he played 33 First-class and 29 List A matches for Auckland in 1984–1993. In 1987-88 he scored the slowest fifty for Auckland against Northern Districts in the Plunket Shield at Seddon Park.

== See also ==
- List of Auckland representative cricketers
