= Ollie Pringle =

New Zealand cricketer (born 1992)

Personal information
- Full name: Oliver Morgan Reynolds Pringle
- Born: 27 May 1992 (age 34); Auckland, New Zealand
- Batting: Left-handed
- Bowling: Right-arm medium
- Relatives: Martin Pringle (father); Peter Webb (uncle)

Domestic team information
- Years: Team
- 2020–22: Auckland
- Source: Cricinfo, 23 December 2020

Ollie Pringle (born 27 May 1992) is a New Zealand former professional cricketer. Ahead of the 2020–21 season, Pringle was awarded a contract with Auckland cricket team. He made his first-class debut for Auckland on 20 October 2020 in the 2020–21 Plunket Shield season. He made his List A debut on 29 November 2020, for Auckland in the 2020–21 Ford Trophy. He made his Twenty20 debut on 24 December 2020, for Auckland in the 2020–21 Super Smash.

Pringle's father, Martin, also played first-class and List A cricket for Auckland, and his uncle, Peter Webb, played Test cricket for New Zealand.

In 2022, Pringle announced his retirement from professional cricket after not being tendered a new contract.
