= Troy Johnson (cricketer) =

New Zealand cricketer (born 1997)

Personal information
- Full name: Troy Manning Johnson
- Born: 1 October 1997 (age 29); Lower Hutt, New Zealand
- Batting: Right-handed
- Bowling: Right-arm offbreak
- Role: Batter
- Relatives: Brett Johnson (brother)

Domestic team information
- Years: Team
- 2018/19–2024/25: Wellington
- 2025/26: Otago
- FC debut: 22 February 2020 Wellington v Canterbury
- T20 debut: 12 January 2019 Wellington v Northern Districts

Career statistics
Competition	FC	LA	T20
Matches	20	41	37
Runs scored	974	1,275	503
Batting average	31.41	33.55	19.34
100s/50s	2/2	1/10	0/3
Top score	194*	113	57
Catches/stumpings	26/–	15/–	19/–
- Source: Cricinfo, 7 July 2025

Troy Manning Johnson (born 1 October 1997) is a New Zealand cricketer.

Born at Lower Hutt in 1997, Johnson was educated at Hutt International Boys' School (HIBS) where he played cricket and field hockey. He was head boy in his final year at school and captained the cricket team, a role his older brother Brett had also performed. Considered "one of New Zealand’s preeminent age group batsman", Johnson scored a record number of runs for HIBS and captained the side to the National Secondary Schools title in 2014–15, playing alongside future New Zealand player Rachin Ravindra. His father was born at Oamaru in Otago and played rugby union for Southland.

After playing age-group cricket for the side, Johnson made his Twenty20 debut for Wellington in the 2018–19 Super Smash on 12 January 2019. He made his first-class debut on 22 February 2020, for Wellington in the 2019–20 Plunket Shield season.

In June 2020, he was offered a contract by Wellington ahead of the 2020–21 domestic cricket season. He made his List A debut on 29 November 2020, for Wellington in the 2020–21 Ford Trophy. On 15 December 2020, in the 2020–21 Ford Trophy, Johnson scored his first century in a List A match, with 113 runs. In March 2021, in the 2020–21 Plunket Shield season, Johnson scored his maiden century in first-class cricket, with 114 runs.

After playing 98 matches for Wellington, in June 2025 Johnson moved to play for Otago for the 2025–26 season.
