= Andrew Morrison (cricketer) =

New Zealand cricketer (born 1994)

Personal information
- Born: 6 September 1994 (age 32)
- Source: Cricinfo, 21 February 2021

Andrew Morrison (born 6 September 1994) is a New Zealand cricketer. He made his List A debut on 21 February 2021, for Auckland in the 2020–21 Ford Trophy. Prior to his List A debut, Morrison was part of the New Zealand XI squad that played against the West Indies in December 2017.
