= Cole Briggs =

New Zealand cricketer (born 1997)

Mitchell Hay
Personal information
- Born: 20 August 1997 (age 29)
- Source: Cricinfo, 19 February 2021

Cole Briggs (born 20 August 1997) is a New Zealand cricketer. He made his List A debut on 19 February 2021, for Auckland in the 2020–21 Ford Trophy. On his debut, he scored 101 runs, and with Sean Solia set a new partnership record for the first wicket for Auckland, with 226 runs. In the following match, he top-scored for Auckland with 99 runs, and made another 100-run partnership with Solia. He made his first-class debut on 18 March 2021, for Auckland in the 2020–21 Plunket Shield season. He made his Twenty20 debut on 17 December 2021, for Auckland in the 2021–22 Men's Super Smash.
