= Ross ter Braak =

New Zealand cricketer (born 1997)

Personal information
- Full name: Ross Matthew Ter Braak
- Born: 5 June 1997 (age 29); Auckland, New Zealand
- Relatives: Daniel ter Braak (brother)
- Source: Cricinfo, 22 January 2021

Ross ter Braak (born 5 June 1997) is a New Zealand cricketer. He made his Twenty20 debut on 22 December 2019, for Auckland in the 2019–20 Super Smash. Prior to his T20 debut, he was named in New Zealand's squad for the 2016 Under-19 Cricket World Cup. He made his List A debut on 1 December 2020, for Auckland in the 2020–21 Ford Trophy. He made his first-class debut on 11 March 2021, for Auckland in the 2020–21 Plunket Shield season.
