= Camden Hawkins =

New Zealand cricketer (born 1994)

Personal information
- Full name: Camden Thomas Hawkins
- Born: 6 December 1994 (age 31); Christchurch, New Zealand
- Batting: Right-handed
- Bowling: Right-arm legbreak

Domestic team information
- Years: Team
- 2018/19–2020/21: Otago

Career statistics
Competition	First-class
Matches	14
Runs scored	680
Batting average	25.18
100s/50s	0/5
Top score	90
Balls bowled	6
Wickets	0
Bowling average	–
5 wickets in innings	–
10 wickets in match	–
Best bowling	–
Catches/stumpings	10/–
- Source: ESPNcricinfo, 30 August 2021

Camden Thomas Hawkins (born 6 December 1994) is a New Zealand cricketer. He made his first-class debut for Otago in the 2018–19 Plunket Shield season on 6 December 2018.

Hawkins was born at Christchurch in 1994 and played for Otago whilst a student, although a series of injuries disrupted his top-level career. He completed a physiotherapy degree and has played club cricket for Randwick Petersham Cricket Club in Sydney Grade Cricket and in England for Colchester and East Essex and for Lindow Cricket Club in the Cheshire League.
