= Brett Johnson (cricketer) =

New Zealand cricketer (born 1994)

Personal information
- Born: 19 December 1994 (age 31)
- Source: Cricinfo, 1 February 2020

Brett Johnson (born 19 December 1994) is a New Zealand cricketer. He made his List A debut on 1 February 2020, for Wellington in the 2019–20 Ford Trophy.
