= William O'Donnell (cricketer) =

New Zealand cricketer (born 1997)

Personal information
- Born: 29 September 1997 (age 29)
- Source: Cricinfo, 16 June 2021

William O'Donnell (born 29 September 1997) is a New Zealand cricketer. He made his List A debut for Auckland in the 2018–19 Ford Trophy on 4 November 2018. He made his first-class debut for Auckland in the 2018–19 Plunket Shield season on 17 March 2019.

In June 2020, he was offered a contract by Auckland ahead of the 2020–21 domestic cricket season. On 15 December 2020, in the 2020–21 Ford Trophy, O'Donnell scored his first century in a List A match, with 106 runs. He made his Twenty20 debut on 24 December 2020, for Auckland in the 2020–21 Super Smash.
