= Sean Davey =

New Zealand cricketer (born 1993)

Personal information
- Born: 8 April 1993 (age 33); Tauranga, New Zealand
- Bowling: Right-arm medium pace
- Role: Bowling allrounder
- Source: Cricinfo, 2 January 2018

Sean Davey (born 8 April 1993) is a New Zealand cricketer. He made his Twenty20 debut for Northern Districts in the 2017–18 Super Smash on 2 January 2018. Prior to his Twenty20 debut, he was part of New Zealand's squad for the 2012 Under-19 Cricket World Cup. He made his first-class debut on 5 November 2020, for Canterbury in the 2020–21 Plunket Shield season. He made his List A debut on 29 November 2020, for Canterbury in the 2020–21 Ford Trophy, taking his first five-wicket haul in List A cricket with 6-30.
