= Travis Muller =

South African cricketer (born 1993)

Personal information
- Born: 4 March 1993 (age 33); Cape Town, Cape Province, South Africa
- Batting: Right-handed
- Bowling: Right-arm fast-medium
- Role: All-rounder

Domestic team information
- Years: Team
- 2011/12–2016/17: Western Province
- 2013/14–2014/15: Cape Cobras
- 2017/18: Wellington
- 2019/20–2024/25: Otago
- FC debut: 16 February 2012 Western Province v Namibia
- LA debut: 11 March 2012 Western Province v Eastern Province

Career statistics
Competition	FC	LA	T20
Matches	76	33	20
Runs scored	1,358	210	40
Batting average	20.26	15.00	6.66
100s/50s	0/3	0/1	0/0
Top score	71	54*	17*
Balls bowled	10,211	1,321	308
Wickets	200	31	19
Bowling average	29.56	38.45	23.68
5 wickets in innings	7	1	0
10 wickets in match	0	0	0
Best bowling	6/52	5/34	3/33
Catches/stumpings	28/–	8/–	5/–
- Source: CricInfo, 9 April 2025

Travis Muller (born 4 March 1993) is a South African cricketer who now lives in New Zealand.

Muller bowls right-arm fast and is a tail-end batsman. He signed a semi-pro contract with the Cape Cobras at the start of the 2012/13 season. He represented the South Africa Under-19 cricket team in early 2012 with limited success. He was included in the Western Province cricket team for the 2015 Africa T20 Cup.

Muller now lives in New Zealand, where he plays for Otago. In 2018 he signed a declaration of intent to play for New Zealand. On 1 December 2020, in round two of the 2020–21 Ford Trophy, Muller took his first five-wicket haul in List A cricket.
