= Joey Field =

New Zealand cricketer (born 2000)

Personal information
- Born: 19 December 2000 (age 25)
- Source: Cricinfo, 27 October 2020

Joey Field (born 19 December 2000) is a New Zealand cricketer. He made his first-class debut on 28 October 2020, for Central Districts in the 2020–21 Plunket Shield season. Prior to his first-class debut, he was named in New Zealand's squad for the 2020 Under-19 Cricket World Cup. He made his List A debut on 29 November 2020, for Central Districts in the 2020–21 Ford Trophy. He made his Twenty20 debut on 27 December 2020, for Central Districts in the 2020–21 Super Smash.
