= Ryan Harrison (cricketer) =

New Zealand cricketer (born 1999)

Personal information
- Full name: Ryan Harrison
- Born: 10 October 1999 (age 27)
- Source: Cricinfo, 29 November 2020

Ryan Harrison (born 10 October 1999) is a New Zealand cricketer. He made his List A debut on 29 November 2020, for Auckland in the 2020–21 Ford Trophy. He made his Twenty20 debut on 24 December 2020, for Auckland in the 2020–21 Super Smash. He made his first-class debut on 27 March 2021, for Auckland in the 2020–21 Plunket Shield season.
