= John Bromley (umpire) =

New Zealand cricket umpire

Personal information
- Full name: John Arthur Kinneir Bromley
- Born: 30 May 1968 (age 58); Hastings, New Zealand
- Role: Umpire

Umpiring information
- WODIs umpired: 4 (2016–2022)
- WT20Is umpired: 1 (2016)
- Source: Cricinfo, 14 February 2023

John Bromley (born 30 May 1968) is a New Zealand cricket umpire. He has stood in domestic matches in the 2016–17 Plunket Shield season and the 2016–17 Ford Trophy. He has also umpired in international matches featuring the New Zealand women's cricket team.
