= Tom Blundell (cricketer) =

New Zealand cricketer (born 1990)

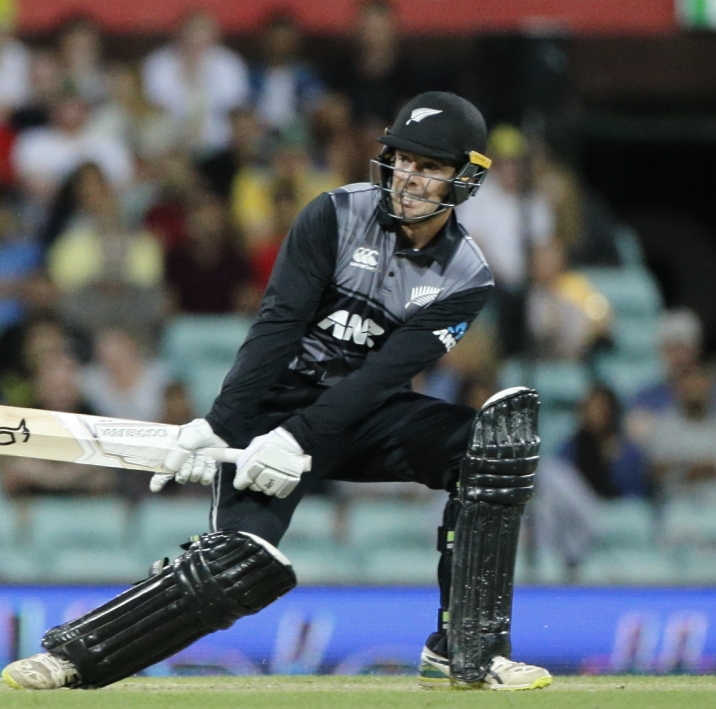
- Blundell in February 2018

Personal information
- Full name: Thomas Ackland Blundell
- Born: 1 September 1990 (age 36); Wellington, New Zealand
- Batting: Right-handed
- Bowling: Right-arm off break
- Role: Wicket-keeper-batter

International information
- National side: New Zealand (2017–present)
- Test debut (cap 273): 1 December 2017 v West Indies
- Last Test: 25 June 2026 v England
- ODI debut (cap 196): 5 February 2020 v India
- Last ODI: 23 December 2023 v Bangladesh
- ODI shirt no.: 66
- T20I debut (cap 73): 8 January 2017 v Bangladesh
- Last T20I: 27 April 2024 v Pakistan
- T20I shirt no.: 66

Domestic team information
- Years: Team
- 2012/13–present: Wellington

Career statistics
Competition	Test	ODI	T20I	FC
Matches	48	12	9	130
Runs scored	2,482	266	91	7,227
Batting average	34.47	29.55	15.16	36.88
100s/50s	6/12	0/2	0/0	18/34
Top score	186	68	30*	186
Catches/stumpings	124/16	13/2	3/0	324/22
Medal record
Men's Cricket
Representing New Zealand
ICC Cricket World Cup
Runner-up	2019 England and Wales
ICC World Test Championship
Winner	2019-2021
- Source: Cricinfo, 29 June 2026

Thomas Ackland Blundell (born 1 September 1990) is a New Zealand professional cricketer who plays as a right-handed batter and wicket-keeper for the New Zealand national team and Wellington. Since making his senior international debut in 2017, he has predominantly played Test matches for the national side. He was part of the squad that won the 2019–2021 ICC World Test Championship and featured in the historic 3–0 away series whitewash against India in 2024.

== Background and domestic career ==
Blundell was educated at Wellington College, Wellington where he excelled at cricket. Named in New Zealand's squad for the 2010 Under-19 Cricket World Cup, playing in one game, Blundell made his first-class debut in 2013. In June 2018, he was awarded a contract with Wellington for the 2018–19 season. In November 2020, in the third round of the 2020–21 Plunket Shield season, Blundell was given out obstructing the field.

== International career ==
In January 2017 he was added to New Zealand's Twenty20 International (T20I) squad as their wicket-keeper for their third match against Bangladesh, after Luke Ronchi was injured. On 8 January 2017 he made his T20I debut for New Zealand against Bangladesh.

In January 2017, he was added to New Zealand's One Day International (ODI) squad as their wicket-keeper against Australia, but he did not play. In November 2017, he was added to New Zealand's Test squad for their series against the West Indies. He made his Test debut for New Zealand against the West Indies on 1 December 2017. He replaced the injured BJ Watling as the wicket-keeper, scoring 107 not out which was the highest Test score by a New Zealand wicket-keeper on debut. He also became the first wicket-keeper since Matt Prior in 2007 to score a century on Test debut.

In April 2019, he was named in New Zealand's squad for the 2019 Cricket World Cup. The International Cricket Council (ICC) named him as one of the five surprise picks for the tournament. However, he did not play a match during the tournament. The following month, he was one of twenty players to be awarded a new contract for the 2019–20 season by New Zealand Cricket.

In January 2020, Blundell was named in New Zealand's One Day International (ODI) squad for their series against India. He made his ODI debut for New Zealand, against India, on 5 February 2020.

On 2 December 2020, he was named as wicket-keeper for the Test squad for their home series against West Indies, replacing BJ Watling, who suffered an injury.
