= Chris Brown (umpire) =

Cricketer and umpire

Personal information
- Full name: Christopher Mark Brown
- Born: 27 March 1973 (age 53); Rarotonga, Cook Islands
- Batting: Right-handed
- Bowling: Right-arm fast-medium
- Role: All-rounder

Domestic team information
- Years: Team
- 1993/94–1996/97: Auckland
- FC debut: 11 December 1993 Auckland v Canterbury
- LA debut: 6 January 1994 Auckland v Canterbury

Umpiring information
- Tests umpired: 11 (2020–2025)
- ODIs umpired: 41 (2016–2025)
- T20Is umpired: 69 (2017–2026)
- WODIs umpired: 10 (2015–2024)
- WT20Is umpired: 8 (2016–2025)

Career statistics
Competition	First-class	List A
Matches	19	25
Runs scored	132	55
Batting average	6.94	7.85
100s/50s	0/0	0/0
Top score	19	13
Balls bowled	2,983	1,167
Wickets	63	26
Bowling average	21.19	31.03
5 wickets in innings	3	2
10 wickets in match	1	0
Best bowling	6/50	5/16
Catches/stumpings	2/–	8/–
- Source: ESPNcricinfo, 14 June 2023

Christopher Mark Brown (born 27 March 1973), commonly known as Chris Brown, is a Cook Islander-New Zealand cricket umpire and former cricketer who previously played representative cricket for Auckland at New Zealand domestic level. Born in Rarotonga, Brown played his early cricket for Auckland under-age teams, and went on to represent the New Zealand national under-19s in several matches as a right-arm fast bowler. Making his first-class debut during the 1993–94 season of the Shell Trophy, he took ten wickets in his debut match, and represented the New Zealand Cricket Academy twice later in the season.

Brown regularly played for Auckland in both the first-class and limited-overs competitions during the mid-1990s, despite the squad also including several international bowlers. However, after the 1997–98 season, he ceased playing for Auckland. Brown resumed his career in the early 2000s for the Cook Islands national cricket team, playing in regional competitions, and going on to play for a representative East Asia-Pacific team. He regularly captained the country of his birth throughout the remainder of the decade, becoming one of the only first-class players to play for the country. After retiring from playing, Brown took up umpiring, and is currently a member of New Zealand Cricket's Umpiring "A" Panel.

== Playing career ==
Born in Rarotonga, the Cook Islands' largest and most populous island, Brown played his representative cricket in New Zealand, and represented the New Zealand national under-19 cricket team in several matches against the Australian under-19s during the 1992–93 season. He made his first-class for Auckland in the following season's Shell Trophy. A right-arm fast bowler, Brown took a ten-wicket haul on debut against Canterbury in December 1993, with figures of 6/50 in the first innings and 4/40 in the second innings. He took four wickets in the following match, against Northern Districts, but was dropped after going wicketless in the next match against Central Districts. Auckland's pace attack during the season had included Willie Watson, Murphy Su'a, Chris Pringle, and Justin Vaughan at various stages, all previous Test cricketers. Brown was, however, a more regular selection in limited-overs matches, taking five wickets in five matches at an average of 17.80. At the end of the season, he also played twice for the New Zealand Academy in first-class matches against Northern Districts and Otago, taking six wickets at an average of 13.17.

== Umpiring career ==
In August 2011, Brown was elevated to New Zealand Cricket's Umpiring "A" Panel for the upcoming 2011–12 season, effectively ranking him in the "top 20" of New Zealand umpires. Having umpired for just two seasons prior to his appointment, he remained on the "A" Panel for the 2012–13 season. Brown umpired his first matches in New Zealand's first-class and one-day competitions during the 2012–13 season, having mainly officiated women's matches and national underage tournaments. In June 2016, he was added to the International Panel of Umpires and Referees.

On 29 December 2016, he stood in his first One Day International (ODI) match, between New Zealand and Bangladesh. On 6 January 2017, he stood in his first Twenty20 International (T20I) match, also between New Zealand and Bangladesh.

He was one of the twelve umpires to officiate matches in the 2019 ICC T20 World Cup Qualifier tournament in the United Arab Emirates. In February 2020, the ICC named him as one of the umpires to officiate in matches during the 2020 ICC Women's T20 World Cup in Australia. He stood in his first Test match on 11 December 2020, between New Zealand and the West Indies.

In September 2023, he was named as one of the sixteen match officials for the 2023 Cricket World Cup.

== See also ==
- List of Test cricket umpires
- List of One Day International cricket umpires
- List of Twenty20 International cricket umpires
