= Derek Walker (cricketer) =

New Zealand cricket umpire

Personal information
- Full name: Derek John Walker
- Born: 23 November 1959 (age 66); Dunedin, Otago, New Zealand
- Batting: Left-handed
- Bowling: Right-arm medium

Domestic team information
- Years: Team
- 1980/81–1988/89: Otago
- 1984: Cambridgeshire

Umpiring information
- ODIs umpired: 9 (2014–2016)
- T20Is umpired: 8 (2013–2016)
- WODIs umpired: 18 (2008–2022)
- WT20Is umpired: 6 (2011–2018)

Career statistics
| Competition | First-class | List A |
|---|---|---|
| Matches | 40 | 31 |
| Runs scored | 1,562 | 487 |
| Batting average | 28.92 | 18.03– |
| 100s/50s | 2/8 | 0/1 |
| Top score | 113 | 63* |
| Balls bowled | 1,608 | 829 |
| Wickets | 19 | 17 |
| Bowling average | 36.36 | 35.52 |
| 5 wickets in innings | 0 | 0 |
| 10 wickets in match | 0 | 0 |
| Best bowling | 4/50 | 4/22 |
| Catches/stumpings | 25/– | 7/– |
- Source: CricInfo, 14 February 2023

Derek John Walker (born 23 November 1959) is a New Zealand cricket umpire and former cricketer. He was a member of the International Panel of Umpires and Referees until June 2016, when he was demoted to New Zealand's national panel.

Walker was born at Dunedin in 1959. He played for Otago age-group sides from the 1979–80 season before playing in England for Nottinghamshire County Cricket Club's Second XI during the 1980 season and making his senior debut for Otago at the end of December 1980. Described as "one of the regulars in the Otago team during the 1980s", he played 71 senior matches for the provincial side as an all-rounder, scoring 1,562 first-class runs and taking 19 wickets.

As well as playing in New Zealand, Walker played English league cricket for 20 seasons and appeared for Worcestershire County Cricket Club's Second XI, under-25 and club and ground sides between 1981 and 1984. In the later year he also played for Cambridgeshire County Cricket Club in the Minor Counties Championship and went on to work as the sports development officer at University College, Worcester before taking on the role of sport and business development manager at the university.

Walker is qualified as a cricket coach and has "built a reputation" in the field in Otago and the UK. In 2003 he became Otago's district development coach for the North Otago region. He made his debut as a top-level umpire in 2004–05, and has umpired at men's and women's international level. He has stood in over 100 first-class matches, List A and Twenty20 cricket matches in New Zealand. He was named New Zealand domestic cricket's umpire of the year in 2020.

== See also ==
- List of One Day International cricket umpires
- List of Twenty20 International cricket umpires
