= Michael Rippon =

Dutch-South African cricketer

Personal information
- Full name: Michael James Rippon
- Born: 14 September 1991 (age 35); Cape Town, Cape Province, South Africa
- Batting: Right-handed
- Bowling: Left-arm unorthodox spin
- Role: All-rounder

International information
- National sides: Netherlands (2013–2022); New Zealand (2022)
- ODI debut (cap 58): 7 July 2013; Netherlands v Ireland
- Last ODI: 4 April 2022; Netherlands v New Zealand
- ODI shirt no.: 91
- T20I debut (cap 27/94): 19 April 2013; Netherlands v Namibia
- Last T20I: 29 July 2022; New Zealand v Scotland
- T20I shirt no.: 91

Domestic team information
- Years: Team
- 2010/11: Cape Cobras
- 2010/11–2011/12: Western Province
- 2012–2013: Sussex
- 2016/17–2022/23: Otago
- 2023/24–present: Canterbury
- 2023/24: Rangpur Riders
- 2024: Vancouver Knights

Career statistics
Competition	ODI	T20I	FC	LA
Matches	9	19	65	125
Runs scored	180	216	2,696	2,677
Batting average	30.00	30.85	28.37	33.04
100s/50s	0/2	0/0	1/13	0/18
Top score	67	42	106	84
Balls bowled	402	328	8,905	5,424
Wickets	13	17	156	160
Bowling average	23.00	20.41	34.08	28.66
5 wickets in innings	0	0	4	2
10 wickets in match	0	0	0	0
Best bowling	4/37	3/8	6/66	5/21
Catches/stumpings	4/–	4/–	34/–	47/–
- Source: ESPNcricinfo, 20 January 2026

Michael James Rippon (born 14 September 1991) is a South African-born cricketer. He current plays international cricket for New Zealand, having previously also played for the Netherlands national cricket team. He is a right-handed batsman who bowls left-arm unorthodox spin.

== Personal life ==
Rippon was born in Cape Town on 14 September 1991. He lived in the Netherlands for three years as a young child, his Dutch grandfather having immigrated to South Africa in the 1970s. He began playing club cricket in the Netherlands at the age of 15, after his coach Ryan Maron recruited him to play for VRA Amsterdam. He attended Rondebosch Boys' High School in Cape Town.

== Early career in South Africa ==
Rippon made his Twenty20 debut for Cape Cobras against the Knights in the 2010–11 Standard Bank Pro20. He made five further appearances for the Cobras in that competition, with his final appearance coming in the final of the competition against the Warriors. In his six appearances in the competition, Rippon took 4 wickets at an average of 31.75, with best figures of 2/28. It was in that same season that he made his debut for Western Province in a List A match against Boland.

The following season, Rippon made his first-class debut for Western Province against KwaZulu-Natal Inland at the City Oval, Pietermaritzburg, in the CSA Provincial Three-Day Competition. He made two further first-class appearances during the competition, against Boland and Easterns. He scored 40 runs in his three first-class matches, and took 6 wickets at an average of 45.33, with best figures of 3/34. He also made four Twenty20 appearances for Western Province in the 2011–12 CSA Provincial T20, taking 6 wickets at an average of 18.16, with best figures of 3/24.

== Career in England and New Zealand ==
Rippon signed for English county Sussex for the 2012 season, signing a contract which kept him there until the end of the 2013 season. Having spent much of the 2012 season playing for the Sussex Second XI, he made his senior debut for the county in the 2012 Friends Life t20 against Kent at the County Ground, Hove. He took figures of 4/23 on debut to help Sussex to an 83 run victory. He has since made two further appearances in the competition, against Surrey at The Oval, and Hampshire at the Rose Bowl. Rippon has suggested he may want to qualify for England.

In June 2018, he was awarded a contract with Otago for the 2018–19 season. In June 2020, he was offered a contract by Otago ahead of the 2020–21 domestic cricket season.

Ahead of the 2023-24 domestic season, Rippon signed with Canterbury.

== International career ==
In July 2018, he was named in the Netherlands' One Day International (ODI) squad, for their series against Nepal. He is now eligible to be selected by the New Zealand national cricket team. In November 2020, Rippon was named in the New Zealand A cricket team for practice matches against the touring West Indies team.

After starring for the Netherlands in games against New Zealand in 2021, Rippon was selected for his newest adopted nation – New Zealand – in June 2022. The team scheduled games against Ireland, Scotland and his former side the Netherlands in the T20 format of the game. He made his T20I debut for New Zealand on 29 July 2022, against Scotland, becoming the 14th cricketer to represent two international teams in T20Is, and the first left-arm wristspinner to represent New Zealand.
