= Kim Cotton =

New Zealand cricket umpire (born 1978)

Personal information
- Full name: Kim Diane Cotton
- Born: 24 February 1978 (age 48); Auckland, New Zealand
- Role: Umpire

Umpiring information
- T20Is umpired: 10 (2023–2025)
- WODIs umpired: 35 (2019–2026)
- WT20Is umpired: 78 (2018–2026)
- Source: ESPNcricinfo, 14 January 2024

Kim Cotton (born 24 February 1978) is a New Zealand cricket umpire. In August 2018, she stood in matches in the 2018–19 ICC World Twenty20 East Asia-Pacific Qualifier tournament, and the following month was added to the Development Panel of ICC Umpires.

== Umpiring career ==
In October 2018, she was named as one of the twelve on-field umpires for the 2018 ICC Women's World Twenty20. In May 2019, the International Cricket Council (ICC) named her as one of the eight women on the ICC Development Panel of Umpires. She officiated in matches during the 2019 ICC Women's World Twenty20 Qualifier tournament in Scotland.

In February 2020, the ICC named her as one of the umpires to officiate in matches during the 2020 ICC Women's T20 World Cup in Australia. Cotton was also named as one of the two on-field umpires for the final of the tournament. In February 2022, she was named as one of the on-field umpires for the 2022 Women's Cricket World Cup in New Zealand. On 1 April 2022, the ICC named Cotton as one of the on-field umpires for the final of the tournament.

On 5 April 2023, she stood in her first men's Twenty20 International (T20I) match between New Zealand and Sri Lanka when Sri Lanka toured to New Zealand. Cotton became the first woman to stand in a men's T20I between two full members as an on-field umpire.

In September 2024 she was named as part of an all-female officiating group for the 2024 ICC Women's T20 World Cup.

== See also ==
- List of Twenty20 International cricket umpires
