= Shaun Haig =

Cricketer and umpire

Personal information
- Full name: Shaun Barry Haig
- Born: 19 March 1982 (age 44); Auckland, New Zealand
- Nickname: Haggis
- Batting: Right-handed
- Role: Batsman

Domestic team information
- Years: Team
- 2005/06–2010/11: Otago
- FC debut: 27 February 2006 Otago v Central Districts
- Last FC: 4 April 2011 Otago v Wellington
- List A debut: 1 February 2006 Otago v Northern Districts
- Last List A: 9 February 2010 Otago v Central Districts

Umpiring information
- ODIs umpired: 17 (2018–2025)
- T20Is umpired: 56 (2017–2025)
- WODIs umpired: 5 (2018–2025)
- WT20Is umpired: 12 (2023–2026)

Career statistics
Competition	First-class	List A
Matches	27	24
Runs scored	1,264	558
Batting average	29.39	25.36
100s/50s	3/5	0/4
Top score	153	93*
Catches/stumpings	24/0	10/1
- Source: ESPNcricinfo, 8 April 2023

Shaun Barry Haig (born 19 March 1982), from New Zealand, is an international cricket umpire and a former cricketer who played first-class and List A cricket for Otago. A right-handed batsman and occasional wicket-keeper, Haig was contracted to the team between 2006 and 2011.

As an umpire, he stood in matches in the 2015–16 Plunket Shield season. In June 2016, his name was added to the International Panel of Umpires and Referees.

On 3 January 2017, Haig made his Twenty20 International (T20I) umpiring debut during a match between New Zealand and Bangladesh.

He was one of the seventeen on-field umpires for the 2018 Under-19 Cricket World Cup.

== See also ==
- List of One Day International cricket umpires
- List of Twenty20 International cricket umpires
