= Billy Bowden =

New Zealand cricket umpire

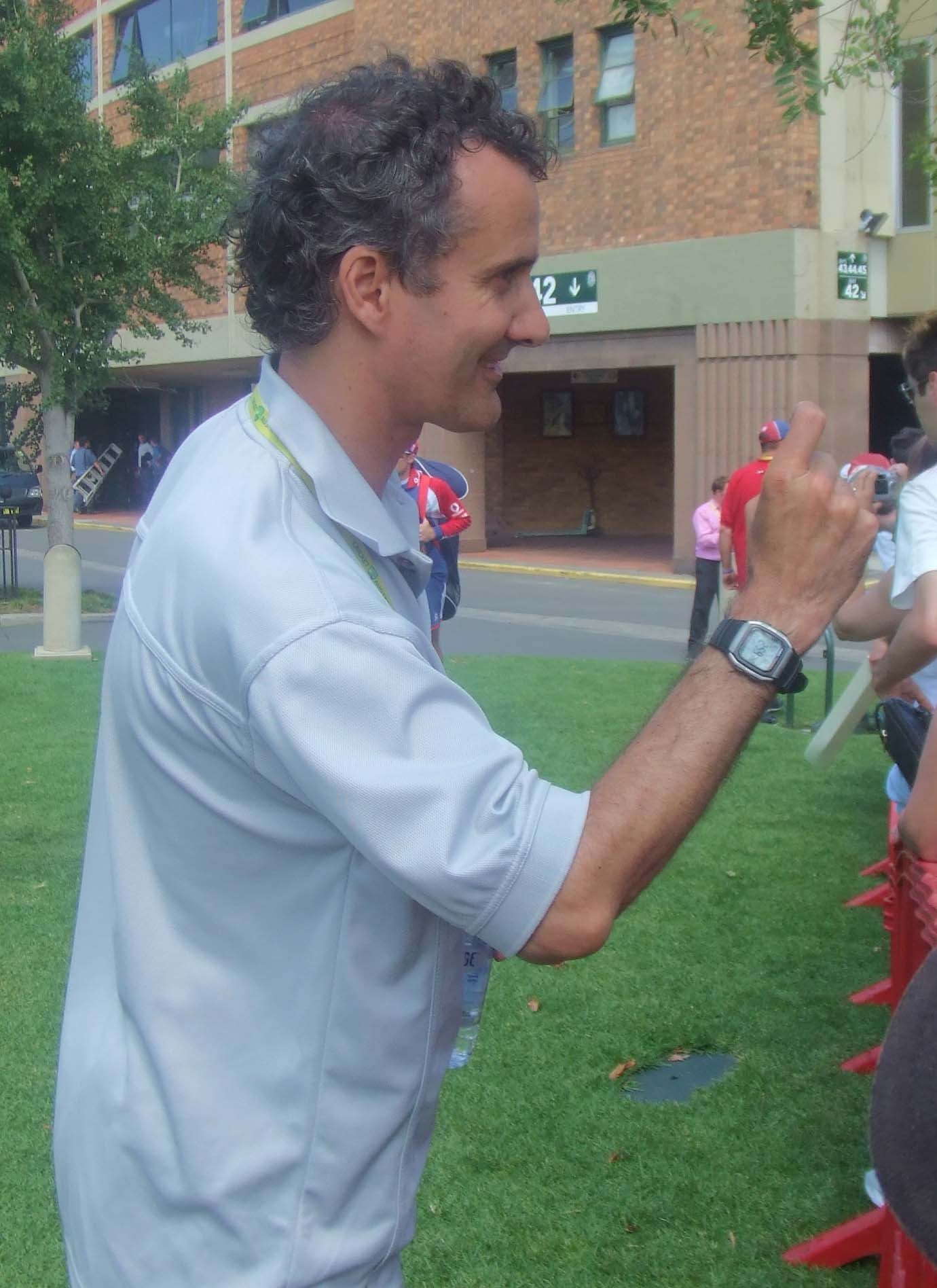

Personal information
- Full name: Brent Fraser Bowden
- Born: 11 April 1963 (age 63); Henderson, New Zealand

Umpiring information
- Tests umpired: 84 (2000–2015)
- ODIs umpired: 200 (1995–2016)
- T20Is umpired: 24 (2005–2016)
- WTests umpired: 1 (1995)
- WODIs umpired: 21 (1995–2021)
- WT20Is umpired: 25 (2009–2020)
- Source: ESPNcricinfo, 21 December 2021

Brent Fraser "Billy" Bowden (born 11 April 1963) is a New Zealand cricket umpire and former cricketer. He was a player until rheumatoid arthritis forced him to retire. He is well known for his dramatic signalling style which includes the famous "crooked finger of doom" out signal. On 6 February 2016, Bowden stood in his 200th One Day International match in the game between New Zealand and Australia in Wellington.

== Early life and career ==
Bowden was born in the Auckland suburb of Henderson and was educated at Westlake Boys High School.

In March 1995, Bowden officiated his first One Day International between New Zealand and Sri Lanka at Hamilton. In March 2000 he was appointed his first Test match as an on-field umpire, and in 2002 he was included in the Emirates Panel of International Umpires. A year later he was asked to umpire at the Cricket World Cup in South Africa, and was chosen to be the fourth umpire in the final between Australia and India. Shortly after this he was duly promoted to the Emirates Elite Panel of ICC Umpires, of which he was a member until 2013. He reprised his role as fourth umpire in the 2007 Cricket World Cup final Bowden was involved in an incident at the 2006 Brisbane Ashes test while standing at the square leg fielding position, when knocked to the ground by a ball hit by Geraint Jones.

He was selected as one of the twenty umpires to stand in matches during the 2015 Cricket World Cup.

He was a member of the International Panel of Umpires and Referees until June 2016, when he was demoted to New Zealand's national panel.

On 24 December 2020, he umpired the Dream 11 domestic T20 competition opening double-header between Wellington Firebirds and Auckland Aces as both men's and women's teams were both featured. In October 2023, Bowden become the first New Zealand umpire to officiate in 200 first-class matches.

Suffering from rheumatoid arthritis, Bowden is known for his distinctive umpire signalling and his "crooked finger dismissal". He has drawn both praise and criticism for his style, with Dave Richardson calling him "one of the best performers of the entire tournament", while Martin Crowe referred to him as a "'Bozo the Clown' character". In 2006, he headed a campaign to raise money and awareness about the disease.

== See also ==
- List of Test cricket umpires
- List of One Day International cricket umpires
- List of Twenty20 International cricket umpires
