= New Zealand cricket team in India in 2022–23 =

International cricket tour

	India	New Zealand
- Dates: 18 January – 1 February 2023
Captains	Rohit Sharma (ODIs); Hardik Pandya (T20Is)	Tom Latham (ODIs); Mitchell Santner (T20Is)

One Day International series
- Results: India won the 3-match series 3–0
Most runs	Shubman Gill (360)	Michael Bracewell (188)
Most wickets	Shardul Thakur (6); Kuldeep Yadav (6)	Blair Tickner (4)
- Player of the series: Shubman Gill (Ind)

Twenty20 International series
- Results: India won the 3-match series 2–1
Most runs	Shubman Gill (144)	Daryl Mitchell (102)
Most wickets	Arshdeep Singh (5); Hardik Pandya (5)	Michael Bracewell (4)
- Player of the series: Hardik Pandya (Ind)

The New Zealand cricket team toured India in January and February 2023 to play three One Day International (ODI) and three Twenty20 International (T20I) matches. In December 2022, the Board of Control for Cricket in India (BCCI) confirmed the fixtures.

India won the ODI series 3–0, moving to the top spot in the ICC ODI rankings. Despite a defeat in the first game, India won the T20I series 2–1, claiming a major 168 runs victory over the opposition in the last game.

== Squads ==
ODIs		T20Is	
India	New Zealand	India	New Zealand
Rohit Sharma (c); Hardik Pandya (vc); Shahbaz Ahmed; K. S. Bharat (wk); Yuzvendra Chahal; Shubman Gill; ~~Shreyas Iyer~~; Ishan Kishan (wk); Virat Kohli; Umran Malik; Rajat Patidar; Mohammed Shami; Mohammed Siraj; Washington Sundar; Shardul Thakur; Suryakumar Yadav; Kuldeep Yadav	Tom Latham (c, wk); Finn Allen; Doug Bracewell; Michael Bracewell; Mark Chapman; Devon Conway; Jacob Duffy; Lockie Ferguson; ~~Matt Henry~~; ~~Adam Milne~~; Daryl Mitchell; Henry Nicholls; Glenn Phillips; Mitchell Santner; Henry Shipley; Ish Sodhi; Blair Tickner	Hardik Pandya (c); Suryakumar Yadav (vc); Yuzvendra Chahal; ~~Ruturaj Gaikwad~~; Shubman Gill; Deepak Hooda; Ishan Kishan (wk); Mukesh Kumar; Umran Malik; Shivam Mavi; Jitesh Sharma (wk); Prithvi Shaw; Arshdeep Singh; Washington Sundar; Rahul Tripathi; Kuldeep Yadav	Mitchell Santner (c); Finn Allen; Michael Bracewell; Mark Chapman; Dane Cleaver (wk); Devon Conway (wk); Jacob Duffy; Lockie Ferguson; Ben Lister; Daryl Mitchell; Glenn Phillips; Michael Rippon; Henry Shipley; Blair Tickner; Ish Sodhi

New Zealand's Adam Milne and Matt Henry were ruled out from ODI series due to injuries, with Blair Tickner and Doug Bracewell named as their respective replacements. India's Shreyas Iyer was ruled out of ODI series due to an injury, with Rajat Patidar named as his replacement. India's Ruturaj Gaikwad was ruled out of T20I series due to an injury.

== ODI series ==
=== 1st ODI ===
18 January 2023
13:30 (D/N)
Scorecard

India; 349/8 (50 overs)	v	New Zealand; 337 (49.2 overs)
Shubman Gill 208 (149); Daryl Mitchell 2/30 (5 overs)		Michael Bracewell 140 (78); Mohammed Siraj 4/46 (10 overs)

India won by 12 runs
Rajiv Gandhi International Cricket Stadium, Hyderabad
Umpires: Anil Chaudhary (Ind) and Nitin Menon (Ind)
Player of the match: Shubman Gill (Ind)

- India won the toss and elected to bat.
- Shubman Gill (Ind) became the fastest Indian player to score 1,000 runs in ODIs (19 innings).
- Shubman Gill became the youngest player to score a double century in ODIs.
- Michael Bracewell scored the third-fastest century by a New Zealand batter in ODI.

=== 2nd ODI ===
21 January 2023
13:30 (D/N)
Scorecard

New Zealand; 108 (34.3 overs)	v	India; 111/2 (20.1 overs)
Glenn Phillips 36 (52); Mohammed Shami 3/18 (6 overs)		Rohit Sharma 51 (50); Mitchell Santner 1/28 (4.1 overs)

India won by 8 wickets
Shaheed Veer Narayan Singh International Cricket Stadium, Raipur
Umpires: K. N. Ananthapadmanabhan (Ind) and Nitin Menon (Ind)
Player of the match: Mohammed Shami (Ind)

- India won the toss and elected to field.
- This was the first ODI match to be played at this venue.

=== 3rd ODI ===
24 January 2023
13:30 (D/N)
Scorecard

India; 385/9 (50 overs)	v	New Zealand; 295 (41.2 overs)
Shubman Gill 112 (78); Blair Tickner 3/76 (10 overs)		Devon Conway 138 (100); Shardul Thakur 3/45 (6 overs)

India won by 90 runs
Holkar Stadium, Indore
Umpires: Jayaraman Madanagopal (Ind) and Nitin Menon (Ind)
Player of the match: Shardul Thakur (Ind)

- New Zealand won the toss and elected to field.
- Shubman Gill (Ind) scored 360 runs in the series, equalling the world record for total runs in a three-match ODI series.

== T20I series ==
=== 1st T20I ===
27 January 2023
19:00 (N)
Scorecard

New Zealand; 176/6 (20 overs)	v	India; 155/9 (20 overs)
Daryl Mitchell 59* (30); Washington Sundar 2/22 (4 overs)		Washington Sundar 50 (28); Mitchell Santner 2/11 (4 overs)

New Zealand won by 21 runs
JSCA International Cricket Stadium, Ranchi
Umpires: Anil Chaudhary (Ind) and Jayaraman Madanagopal (Ind)
Player of the match: Daryl Mitchell (NZ)

- India won the toss and elected to field.

=== 2nd T20I ===
29 January 2023
19:00 (N)
Scorecard

New Zealand; 99/8 (20 overs)	v	India; 101/4 (19.5 overs)
Mitchell Santner 19* (23); Arshdeep Singh 2/7 (2 overs)		Suryakumar Yadav 26* (31); Michael Bracewell 1/13 (4 overs)

India won by 6 wickets
Ekana Cricket Stadium, Lucknow
Umpires: K. N. Ananthapadmanabhan (Ind) and Nitin Menon (Ind)
Player of the match: Suryakumar Yadav (Ind)

- New Zealand won the toss and elected to bat.
- This was New Zealand's lowest total against India in T20Is in a completed innings.

=== 3rd T20I ===
1 February 2023
19:00 (N)
Scorecard

India; 234/4 (20 overs)	v	New Zealand; 66 (12.1 overs)
Shubman Gill 126* (63); Daryl Mitchell 1/6 (1 over)		Daryl Mitchell 35 (25); Hardik Pandya 4/16 (4 overs)

India won by 168 runs
Narendra Modi Stadium, Ahmedabad
Umpires: Jayaraman Madanagopal (Ind) and Nitin Menon (Ind)
Player of the match: Shubman Gill (Ind)

- India won the toss and elected to bat.
- Ben Lister (NZ) made his T20I debut.
- Shubman Gill (126*) made the second highest individual score by an Indian player in T20Is.
- This was the highest score (by any team) against New Zealand in T20Is.
- This was New Zealand's lowest total against India in T20Is in a completed innings, lowering the total that they achieved in the previous T20I.
- This was India's biggest margin of victory (in terms of runs) in T20Is and also the biggest margin of victory for matches between two Full Member teams.
