= English cricket team in New Zealand in 2022–23 =

International Cricket Tour

	New Zealand	England
- Dates: 16 – 28 February 2023
Captains	Tim Southee	Ben Stokes

Test series
- Result: 2-match series drawn 1–1
Most runs	Tom Blundell (267)	Harry Brook (329)
Most wickets	Neil Wagner (11)	James Anderson (10); Stuart Broad (10); Jack Leach (10)
- Player of the series: Harry Brook (Eng)

The England cricket team toured New Zealand in February 2023 to play two Test matches. The Test matches were not part of the 2021–23 ICC World Test Championship. New Zealand Cricket (NZC) confirmed the fixtures for the tour in June 2022.

== Squads ==
Tests
New Zealand	England
Tim Southee (c); Tom Latham (vc); Tom Blundell (wk); Michael Bracewell; Devon Conway; Jacob Duffy; Matt Henry; ~~Kyle Jamieson~~; Scott Kuggeleijn; Daryl Mitchell; Henry Nicholls; Ish Sodhi; Blair Tickner; Neil Wagner; Kane Williamson; Will Young	Ben Stokes (c); Ollie Pope (vc); James Anderson; Stuart Broad; Harry Brook; Zak Crawley; Ben Duckett; Ben Foakes (wk); Will Jacks; Dan Lawrence; Jack Leach; Matthew Potts; Ollie Robinson; Joe Root; Olly Stone

Ahead of the first Test, Kyle Jamieson was ruled out of the series due to the recurrence of the stress fracture while Matt Henry was unavailable for the first Test due to family reasons. Both of these players were replaced by Jacob Duffy and Scott Kuggeleijn in New Zealand's squad.

== Tour match ==
8–9 February 2023 (D/N)
Scorecard

England	v	New Zealand XI
465 (69.2 overs); Harry Brook 97 (71); Kyle Jamieson 3/65 (15 overs)		310 (82.1 overs); Quinn Sunde 91 (128); Olly Stone 3/54 (11.1 overs)

Match drawn
Seddon Park, Hamilton
Umpires: Chris Brown (NZ) and Tim Parlane (NZ)

- Toss uncontested, England batted first.

== Test series ==
=== 1st Test ===
16–20 February 2023 (Note: While five days of play were scheduled for each Test, the first Test reached a result in four days.) (D/N)
Scorecard

England	v	New Zealand
325/9d (58.2 overs); Harry Brook 89 (81); Neil Wagner 4/82 (16.2 overs)		306 (82.5 overs); Tom Blundell 138 (181); Ollie Robinson 4/54 (19 overs)
374 (73.5 overs); Joe Root 57 (62); Blair Tickner 3/55 (12 overs)		126 (45.3 overs); Daryl Mitchell 57* (101); James Anderson 4/18 (10.3 overs)

England won by 267 runs
Bay Oval, Mount Maunganui
Umpires: Aleem Dar (Pak) and Chris Gaffaney (NZ)
Player of the match: Harry Brook (Eng)

- New Zealand won the toss and elected to field.
- Scott Kuggeleijn and Blair Tickner (NZ) both made their Test debuts.
- Ben Stokes (Eng) surpassed Brendon McCullum's (NZ) record of 107 sixes to become the highest six hitter in Test cricket.
- James Anderson and Stuart Broad (Eng) became the highest wicket takers as a pair in Tests, surpassing Warne-McGrath (Aus) record of 1001 wickets.

=== 2nd Test ===
24–28 February 2023
Scorecard

England	v	New Zealand
435/8d (87.1 overs); Harry Brook 186 (176); Matt Henry 4/100 (22.1 overs)		209 (53.2 overs); Tim Southee 73 (49); Stuart Broad 4/61 (14.2 overs)
256 (74.2 overs); Joe Root 95 (113); Neil Wagner 4/62 (15.2 overs)		483 (162.3 overs) (f/o); Kane Williamson 132 (282); Jack Leach 5/157 (61.3 overs)

New Zealand won by 1 run
Basin Reserve, Wellington
Umpires: Chris Gaffaney (NZ) and Rod Tucker (Aus)
Player of the match: Kane Williamson (NZ)

- New Zealand won the toss and elected to field.
- Only 65 overs per day were possible on Day 1 & 2 due to rain.
- Kane Williamson surpassed Ross Taylor's record of 7,683 runs to become the highest run scorer for New Zealand in Tests.
- New Zealand became the fourth side to win a Test match after being asked to follow-on.
- This was only the second time that a side has won a Test by one run.
