= Sri Lankan cricket team in New Zealand in 2022–23 =

International cricket tour

	New Zealand	Sri Lanka
- Dates: 9 March – 8 April 2023
Captains	Tim Southee (Tests); Tom Latham (ODIs & T20Is)	Dimuth Karunaratne (Tests); Dasun Shanaka (ODIs & T20Is)

Test series
- Result: New Zealand won the 2-match series 2–0
Most runs	Kane Williamson (337)	Dimuth Karunaratne (207)
Most wickets	Matt Henry (11)	Asitha Fernando (7)
- Player of the series: Kane Williamson (NZ)

One Day International series
- Results: New Zealand won the 3-match series 2–0
Most runs	Will Young (112)	Pathum Nissanka (66)
Most wickets	Henry Shipley (8)	Chamika Karunaratne (4); Lahiru Kumara (4)
- Player of the series: Henry Shipley (NZ)

Twenty20 International series
- Results: New Zealand won the 3-match series 2–1
Most runs	Tim Seifert (167)	Kusal Perera (121)
Most wickets	Adam Milne (7)	Lahiru Kumara (3); Pramod Madushan (3)
- Player of the series: Tim Seifert (NZ)

The Sri Lanka men's cricket team toured New Zealand in March and April 2023 to play two Test, three One Day International (ODI) and three Twenty20 International (T20I) matches. The Test matches formed part of the 2021–2023 ICC World Test Championship and the ODI series formed part of the inaugural 2020–2023 ICC Cricket World Cup Super League.

New Zealand won the Test series 2–0. New Zealand won the ODI series by the same margin, with the second game being abandoned due to rain.

The first T20I ended in a tie, with Sri Lanka winning the match in the super over. New Zealand won the second T20I by 9 wickets, and levelled the series 1–1. New Zealand went on to win the third T20I by 4 wickets, and take the series 2–1.

== Squads ==
Tests		ODIs		T20Is	
New Zealand	Sri Lanka	New Zealand	Sri Lanka	New Zealand	Sri Lanka
Tim Southee (c); Tom Blundell (wk); Doug Bracewell; Michael Bracewell; Devon Conway (wk); Matt Henry; Scott Kuggeleijn; Tom Latham (wk); Daryl Mitchell; Henry Nicholls; Blair Tickner; Neil Wagner; Kane Williamson; Will Young	Dimuth Karunaratne (c); Dinesh Chandimal (wk); Dhananjaya de Silva; Niroshan Dickwella (wk); Asitha Fernando; Oshada Fernando; Vishwa Fernando; Prabath Jayasuriya; Chamika Karunaratne; Lahiru Kumara; Nishan Madushka (wk); Angelo Mathews; Kamindu Mendis; Kusal Mendis (wk); Ramesh Mendis; Kasun Rajitha; Milan Rathnayake	Tom Latham (c, wk); Finn Allen; Tom Blundell (wk); Chad Bowes; ~~Michael Bracewell~~; Mark Chapman; ~~Lockie Ferguson~~; Matt Henry; Ben Lister; Daryl Mitchell; Henry Nicholls; Glenn Phillips; Rachin Ravindra; Henry Shipley; Ish Sodhi; Blair Tickner; Will Young	Dasun Shanaka (c); Kusal Mendis (vc, wk); Sahan Arachchige; Charith Asalanka; Dhananjaya de Silva; Nuwanidu Fernando; Wanindu Hasaranga; Chamika Karunaratne; Lahiru Kumara; Pramod Madushan; Dilshan Madushanka; Angelo Mathews; Pathum Nissanka; Matheesha Pathirana; Kasun Rajitha; Sadeera Samarawickrama; Maheesh Theekshana; Dunith Wellalage	Tom Latham (c, wk); Chad Bowes; Mark Chapman; Matt Henry; Ben Lister; Adam Milne; Daryl Mitchell; James Neesham; Rachin Ravindra; Tim Seifert; Henry Shipley; Ish Sodhi; Will Young	Dasun Shanaka (c); Wanindu Hasaranga (vc); Charith Asalanka; Lasith Croospulle; Dhananjaya de Silva; Nuwanidu Fernando; Chamika Karunaratne; Lahiru Kumara; Pramod Madushan; Dilshan Madushanka; Kusal Mendis (wk); Pathum Nissanka; Matheesha Pathirana; Kusal Perera; Kasun Rajitha; Sadeera Samarawickrama; Maheesh Theekshana; Dunith Wellalage

On 12 March 2023, Doug Bracewell was added to the New Zealand's squad for the second Test. On the same day, New Zealand's Neil Wagner was ruled out of second Test due to an injury.

Finn Allen, Lockie Ferguson and Glenn Phillips were selected in the New Zealand's ODI squad only for the first ODI, while Mark Chapman, Ben Lister and Henry Nicholls only for the last two ODIs. On 18 March 2023, Rachin Ravindra replaced Michael Bracewell, who was released from the New Zealand's ODI squad to join Royal Challengers Bangalore for the 2023 Indian Premier League. On 23 March 2023, New Zealand's Lockie Ferguson was ruled out of the first ODI due to hamstring injury, with Lister named as his replacement.

== Tour match ==
4–5 March 2023
Scorecard

Sri Lanka	v	New Zealand XI
276/4d (57.3 overs); Kusal Mendis 95 (87); Ross ter Braak 1/36 (10 overs)		141/1 (38 overs); Jack Boyle 73* (123); Lahiru Kumara 1/16 (5 overs)

Match drawn
Bert Sutcliffe Oval, Lincoln
Umpires: Cory Black (NZ) and Shaun Haig (NZ)

- Toss uncontested, Sri Lanka batted first.
- No play was possible on day 2 due to rain.

== Test series ==
=== 1st Test ===
9–13 March 2023
Scorecard

Sri Lanka	v	New Zealand
355 (92.4 overs); Kusal Mendis 87 (83); Tim Southee 5/64 (26.4 overs)		373 (107.3 overs); Daryl Mitchell 102 (194); Asitha Fernando 4/85 (29.3 overs)
302 (105.3 overs); Angelo Mathews 115 (235); Blair Tickner 4/100 (28 overs)		285/8 (70 overs); Kane Williamson 121* (194); Asitha Fernando 3/63 (19 overs)

New Zealand won by 2 wickets
Hagley Oval, Christchurch
Umpires: Chris Gaffaney (NZ) and Michael Gough (Eng)
Player of the match: Daryl Mitchell (NZ)

- New Zealand won the toss and elected to field.
- 15 overs of play was lost on day 1 due to rain.
- 37 overs of play was lost on day 5 due to rain.
- Angelo Mathews became the third cricketer from Sri Lanka to score 7,000 runs in Tests.
- Dinesh Chandimal became the eleventh cricketer from Sri Lanka to score 5,000 runs in Tests.
- As a result of this match, India qualified for the 2021–2023 ICC World Test Championship Final, while Sri Lanka were eliminated.
- World Test Championship points: South Africa 12, West Indies 0.New Zealand 12, Sri Lanka 0.

The final day of the match started with New Zealand on 28/1, needing a total of 285 runs to win. The play of the day was reduced to 53 overs because of rain. In a dramatic finish, New Zealand tied the score with two balls remaining, and scored the winning run by running a bye on the final ball.

=== 2nd Test ===
17–21 March 2023 (Note: While five days of play were scheduled for each Test, the second test reached a result in four days.)
Scorecard

New Zealand	v	Sri Lanka
580/4d (123 overs); Kane Williamson 215 (296); Kasun Rajitha 2/126 (32 overs)		164 (66.5 overs); Dimuth Karunaratne 89 (188); Matt Henry 3/44 (20 overs)
		358 (142 overs) (f/o); Dhananjaya de Silva 98 (185); Tim Southee 3/51 (27 overs)

New Zealand won by an innings and 58 runs
Basin Reserve, Wellington
Umpires: Chris Gaffaney (NZ) and Richard Illingworth (Eng)
Player of the match: Henry Nicholls (NZ)

- Sri Lanka won the toss and elected to field.
- 48 overs of play was possible on day 1 due to rain.
- Nishan Madushka (SL) made his Test debut.
- Kane Williamson became the first cricketer from New Zealand to score 8,000 runs in Tests.
- Kane Williamson became the leading century scorer for New Zealand in international cricket (41).
- Henry Nicholls (NZ) scored his first double century in Tests.
- World Test Championship points: New Zealand 12, Sri Lanka 0.

== ODI series ==
=== 1st ODI ===
25 March 2023
14:00 (D/N)
Scorecard

New Zealand; 274 (49.3 overs)	v	Sri Lanka; 76 (19.5 overs)
Finn Allen 51 (49); Chamika Karunaratne 4/43 (9 overs)		Angelo Mathews 18 (25); Henry Shipley 5/31 (7 overs)

New Zealand won by 198 runs
Eden Park, Auckland
Umpires: Shaun Haig (NZ) and Wayne Knights (NZ)
Player of the match: Henry Shipley (NZ)

- Sri Lanka won the toss and elected to field.
- Chad Bowes and Rachin Ravindra (NZ) both made their ODI debuts.
- Henry Shipley (NZ) took his first five-wicket haul in ODIs.
- This was Sri Lanka's lowest total against New Zealand in ODIs.
- This was New Zealand's biggest victory in terms of runs against Sri Lanka in ODIs.
- World Cup Super League points: New Zealand 10, Sri Lanka −1. (Note: Sri Lanka were deducted one WCSL point for having a slow over rate.)

=== 2nd ODI ===
28 March 2023
14:00 (D/N)
Scorecard

New Zealand	v	Sri Lanka

Match abandoned
Hagley Oval, Christchurch
Umpires: Chris Brown (NZ) and Shaun Haig (NZ)

- No toss.
- No play was possible due to rain.
- World Cup Super League points: New Zealand 5, Sri Lanka 5.

=== 3rd ODI ===
31 March 2023
14:00 (D/N)
Scorecard

Sri Lanka; 157 (41.3 overs)	v	New Zealand; 159/4 (32.5 overs)
Pathum Nissanka 57 (64); Matt Henry 3/14 (10 overs)		Will Young 86* (113); Lahiru Kumara 2/39 (7.4 overs)

New Zealand won by 6 wickets
Seddon Park, Hamilton
Umpires: Chris Brown (NZ) and Wayne Knights (NZ)
Player of the match: Will Young (NZ)

- Sri Lanka won the toss and elected to bat.
- World Cup Super League points: New Zealand 10, Sri Lanka 0.

== T20I series ==
=== 1st T20I ===
2 April 2023
13:00
Scorecard

Sri Lanka; 196/5 (20 overs)	v	New Zealand; 196/8 (20 overs)
Charith Asalanka 67 (41); James Neesham 2/30 (4 overs)		Daryl Mitchell 66 (44); Dasun Shanaka 2/20 (2 overs)

Match tied
(Sri Lanka won the Super Over)
Eden Park, Auckland
Umpires: Chris Brown (NZ) and Shaun Haig (NZ)
Player of the match: Charith Asalanka (SL)

- New Zealand won the toss and elected to field.
- Chad Bowes and Henry Shipley (NZ) both made their T20I debuts.

=== 2nd T20I ===
5 April 2023
13:00
Scorecard

Sri Lanka; 141 (19 overs)	v	New Zealand; 146/1 (14.4 overs)
Dhananjaya de Silva 37 (26); Adam Milne 5/26 (4 overs)		Tim Seifert 79* (43); Kasun Rajitha 1/25 (2 overs)

New Zealand won by 9 wickets
University Oval, Dunedin
Umpires: Kim Cotton (NZ) and Wayne Knights (NZ)
Player of the match: Adam Milne (NZ)

- New Zealand won the toss and elected to field.
- Kim Cotton (NZ) became the first woman to stand as an on-field umpire in a men's T20I between full members.
- Adam Milne (NZ) took his first five-wicket haul in T20Is.

=== 3rd T20I ===
8 April 2023
13:00
Scorecard

Sri Lanka; 182/6 (20 overs)	v	New Zealand; 183/6 (19.5 overs)
Kusal Mendis 73 (48); Ben Lister 2/37 (4 overs)		Tim Seifert 88 (48); Lahiru Kumara 3/38 (3.5 overs)

New Zealand won by 4 wickets
John Davies Oval, Queenstown
Umpires: Chris Brown (NZ) and Shaun Haig (NZ)
Player of the match: Tim Seifert (NZ)

- New Zealand won the toss and elected to field.
- This was the first T20I match to be played at this venue.
