= New Zealand cricket team in Pakistan in 2022–23 =

The New Zealand national cricket team visited Pakistan twice in 2022–23:

- New Zealand cricket team in Pakistan in 2022–23 (December 2022), New Zealand's tour to Pakistan in December 2022, part of the 2022–23 international calendar
- New Zealand cricket team in Pakistan in 2022–23 (April 2023), New Zealand's tour to Pakistan in April 2023, part of the 2022–23 international calendar
