= Bangladeshi cricket team in New Zealand in 2021–22 =

International cricket tour

	New Zealand	Bangladesh
- Dates: 1 – 13 January 2022
Captains	Tom Latham	Mominul Haque

Test series
- Result: 2-match series drawn 1–1
Most runs	Tom Latham (267)	Litton Das (196)
Most wickets	Trent Boult (9)	Ebadot Hossain (9)
- Player of the series: Devon Conway (NZ)

The Bangladesh cricket team toured New Zealand in January 2022 to play two Test matches. The Test series formed part of the 2021–2023 ICC World Test Championship. In September 2021, the tour dates were moved back slightly due to COVID-19 quarantine requirements for travelling to New Zealand. Initially the tour was also scheduled to include three Twenty20 International matches. However, these were dropped from the itinerary when the dates were confirmed by New Zealand Cricket in November 2021.

Bangladesh won the first Test by eight wickets. It was Bangladesh's first win in Test cricket against New Zealand, and their first win in international cricket against New Zealand in New Zealand. However, New Zealand went on to win the second Test inside three days, beating Bangladesh by an innings and 117 runs, to draw the series 1–1. It was also Ross Taylor's final Test match, after he had announced his retirement from international cricket in December 2021.

== Squads ==
Tests
New Zealand	Bangladesh
Tom Latham (c); Tom Blundell (wk); Trent Boult; Devon Conway; Matt Henry; Kyle Jamieson; Daryl Mitchell; Henry Nicholls; Rachin Ravindra; Tim Southee; Ross Taylor; Neil Wagner; Will Young	Mominul Haque (c); Khaled Ahmed; Taskin Ahmed; Yasir Ali; Litton Das (wk); ~~Shakib Al Hasan~~; Mahmudul Hasan Joy; Mehidy Hasan; Nurul Hasan; Ebadot Hossain; Shadman Islam; Shohidul Islam; Shoriful Islam; Taijul Islam; Abu Jayed; Fazle Mahmud; Mohammad Naim; Mushfiqur Rahim (wk); Najmul Hossain Shanto

Shakib Al Hasan was originally named in Bangladesh's squad, but was granted approval by the Bangladesh Cricket Board (BCB) to miss the tour. Fazle Mahmud was named as Shakib Al Hasan's replacement.

== Tour match ==
Ahead of the Test series, two tour matches were scheduled to be played. However, the first match was cancelled due to an increase in quarantine requirements for the Bangladesh team in New Zealand.

28–29 December 2021
Scorecard

New Zealand XI	v	Bangladesh
146/7d (48 overs); Jakob Bhula 57 (75); Abu Jayed 3/36 (11 overs)		269/8 (76.4 overs); Mushfiqur Rahim 66 (91); Brett Randell 2/27 (13 overs)

Match drawn
Bay Oval No 2, Mount Maunganui
Umpires: Chris Gaffaney (NZ) and Wayne Knights (NZ)

- Bangladesh won the toss and elected to field.

== Test series ==
=== 1st Test ===
1–5 January 2022
Scorecard

New Zealand	v	Bangladesh
328 (108.1 overs); Devon Conway 122 (227); Shoriful Islam 3/69 (26 overs)		458 (176.2 overs); Mominul Haque 88 (244); Trent Boult 4/85 (35.2 overs)
169 (73.4 overs); Will Young 69 (172); Ebadot Hossain 6/46 (21 overs)		42/2 (16.5 overs); Najmul Hossain Shanto 17 (41); Kyle Jamieson 1/12 (3.5 overs)

Bangladesh won by 8 wickets
Bay Oval, Tauranga
Umpires: Chris Brown (NZ) and Chris Gaffaney (NZ)
Player of the match: Ebadot Hossain (Ban)

- Bangladesh won the toss and elected to field.
- Mehidy Hasan (Ban) scored his 1,000th run in Tests.
- Ebadot Hossain (Ban) took his first five-wicket haul in Tests.
- World Test Championship points: Bangladesh 12, New Zealand 0.

=== 2nd Test ===
9–13 January 2022 (Note: While five days of play were scheduled for each Test, the second Test reached a result in three days.)
Scorecard

New Zealand	v	Bangladesh
521/6d (128.5 overs); Tom Latham 252 (373); Shoriful Islam 2/79 (28 overs)		126 (41.2 overs); Yasir Ali 55 (95); Trent Boult 5/43 (13.2 overs)
		278 (79.3 overs) (f/o); Litton Das 102 (114); Kyle Jamieson 4/82 (18 overs)

New Zealand won by an innings and 117 runs
Hagley Oval, Christchurch
Umpires: Chris Gaffaney (NZ) and Wayne Knights (NZ)
Player of the match: Tom Latham (NZ)

- Bangladesh won the toss and elected to field.
- Mohammad Naim (Ban) made his Test debut.
- Trent Boult (NZ) took his 300th wicket in Tests.
- World Test Championship points: New Zealand 12, Bangladesh 0.
