= New Zealand cricket team in Pakistan in 2022–23 (April 2023) =

International cricket tour

	Pakistan	New Zealand
- Dates: 14 April – 7 May 2023
Captains	Babar Azam	Tom Latham

One Day International series
- Results: Pakistan won the 5-match series 4–1
Most runs	Fakhar Zaman (363)	Daryl Mitchell (297)
Most wickets	Haris Rauf (9)	Matt Henry (8)
- Player of the series: Fakhar Zaman (Pak)

Twenty20 International series
- Results: 5-match series drawn 2–2
Most runs	Mohammed Rizwan (162)	Mark Chapman (290)
Most wickets	Haris Rauf (11)	Matt Henry (6)
- Player of the series: Mark Chapman (NZ)

The New Zealand cricket team toured Pakistan in April and May 2023 to play five One Day International (ODI) matches and five Twenty20 International (T20I) matches. The tour was to make up for the series that was postponed in September 2021. The ODI series was not part of the Super League. However, it formed part of both teams' preparations for the 2023 Cricket World Cup.

In April 2022, the Pakistan Cricket Board (PCB) confirmed that the series would be taking place. In May 2022, New Zealand Cricket confirmed that they would compensate the PCB for the postponed series, as well as playing extra matches on the tour. In October 2022, the PCB announced the fixtures for the tour. In April 2023, the PCB announced the revised fixtures for the tour.

Prior to this tour, New Zealand toured Pakistan in December 2022 and January 2023 to play two Test matches and three ODIs.

Pakistan defeated New Zealand by 88 runs in the first T20I, and went on to win the second T20I by 38 runs to lead the series 2–0. New Zealand won the third T20I by a margin of 4 runs to keep themselves alive in the series. The fourth T20I ended with no results due to a hailstorm, with the series standing at 2–1. New Zealand won the last T20I by 6 wickets to level the series 2–2.

Pakistan won the first ODI by 5 wickets and went on to win the second ODI by 7 wickets to lead the series 2–0. Pakistan again won the third ODI by 26 runs to take the unassailable lead in the series, winning their first ODI series against New Zealand since 2011. Pakistan won the fourth ODI by 102 runs and moved a step towards a series white-wash.

== Squads ==
ODIs		T20Is	
Pakistan	New Zealand	Pakistan	New Zealand
Babar Azam (c); Shadab Khan (vc); Shaheen Afridi; Mohammad Rizwan (wk); Mohammad Nawaz; Usama Mir; Imam-ul-Haq; Fakhar Zaman; Mohammad Haris; Ihsanullah; Abdullah Shafique; Salman Ali Agha; Naseem Shah; Mohammad Wasim Jr.; ~~Haris Sohail~~; Shan Masood; Iftikhar Ahmed; Haris Rauf	Tom Latham (c, wk); Tom Blundell; Chad Bowes; Mark Chapman; Matt Henry; Ben Lister; Cole McConchie; Adam Milne; Daryl Mitchell; James Neesham; Henry Nicholls; Rachin Ravindra; Henry Shipley; Ish Sodhi; Blair Tickner; Will Young	Babar Azam (c); Shadab Khan (vc); Imad Wasim; Shaheen Afridi; Saim Ayub; Mohammad Rizwan (wk); Mohammad Nawaz; Zaman Khan; Mohammad Haris; Fakhar Zaman; Faheem Ashraf; Ihsanullah; Naseem Shah; Shan Masood; Iftikhar Ahmed; Haris Rauf	Tom Latham (c, wk); Chad Bowes; Mark Chapman; Dane Cleaver; Matt Henry; Ben Lister; Adam Milne; Cole McConchie; Daryl Mitchell; James Neesham; Rachin Ravindra; Henry Shipley; Ish Sodhi; Blair Tickner; Will Young

Pakistan named their full-strength squad for both the series, after resting their several senior players during three-match T20I series against Afghanistan which concluded in March 2023. Whereas, New Zealand were without their several first-choice players, due to either injury or playing in the 2023 Indian Premier League.

On 24 April 2023, Mohammad Haris was added to Pakistan's ODI squad. On 25 April 2023, Mark Chapman was added to New Zealand's ODI squad. Haris Sohail injured his left shoulder just before the start of ODI series, and was ruled out of Pakistan's ODI squad. On 29 April 2023, Iftikhar Ahmed was named as his replacement.

== T20I series ==
=== 1st T20I ===
14 April 2023
21:00 (N)
Scorecard

Pakistan; 182 (19.5 overs)	v	New Zealand; 94 (15.3 overs)
Saim Ayub 47 (28); Matt Henry 3/32 (4 overs)		Mark Chapman 34 (27); Haris Rauf 4/18 (3.3 overs)

Pakistan won by 88 runs
Gaddafi Stadium, Lahore
Umpires: Faisal Afridi (Pak) and Ahsan Raza (Pak)
Player of the match: Haris Rauf (Pak)

- Pakistan won the toss and elected to bat.
- Babar Azam (Pak) played in his 100th T20I.
- Matt Henry became the fourth New Zealand cricketer to take a hat-trick in T20Is.

=== 2nd T20I ===
15 April 2023
21:00 (N)
Scorecard

Pakistan; 192/4 (20 overs)	v	New Zealand; 154/7 (20 overs)
Babar Azam 101* (58); Matt Henry 2/29 (4 overs)		Mark Chapman 65* (40); Haris Rauf 4/27 (4 overs)

Pakistan won by 38 runs
Gaddafi Stadium, Lahore
Umpires: Rashid Riaz (Pak) and Asif Yaqoob (Pak)
Player of the match: Babar Azam (Pak)

- Pakistan won the toss and elected to bat.
- Babar Azam (Pak) equalled the record for most wins in T20Is as captain (42).
- Babar Azam also became the first player to score three T20I centuries as captain.

=== 3rd T20I ===
17 April 2023
21:00 (N)
Scorecard

New Zealand; 163/5 (20 overs)	v	Pakistan; 159 (20 overs)
Tom Latham 64 (49); Haris Rauf 2/31 (4 overs)		Iftikhar Ahmed 60 (24); James Neesham 3/38 (4 overs)

New Zealand won by 4 runs
Gaddafi Stadium, Lahore
Umpires: Faisal Afridi (Pak) and Ahsan Raza (Pak)
Player of the match: Tom Latham (NZ)

- New Zealand won the toss and elected to bat.
- Shaheen Afridi (Pak) played in his 50th T20I.

=== 4th T20I ===
20 April 2023
21:00 (N)
Scorecard

New Zealand; 164/5 (18.5 overs)	v	Pakistan
Mark Chapman 71* (42); Imad Wasim 3/19 (4 overs)

No result
Rawalpindi Cricket Stadium, Rawalpindi
Umpires: Faisal Afridi (Pak) and Rashid Riaz (Pak)

- Pakistan won the toss and elected to field.
- No play was possible for a hailstrom.

=== 5th T20I ===
24 April 2023
21:00 (N)
Scorecard

Pakistan; 193/5 (20 overs)	v	New Zealand; 194/4 (19.2 overs)
Mohammad Rizwan 98* (62); Blair Tickner 3/33 (4 overs)		Mark Chapman 104* (57); Imad Wasim 2/21 (4 overs)

New Zealand won by 6 wickets
Rawalpindi Cricket Stadium, Rawalpindi
Umpires: Aleem Dar (Pak) and Asif Yaqoob (Pak)
Player of the match: Mark Chapman (NZ)

- New Zealand won the toss and elected to field.
- Mark Chapman (NZ) scored his maiden T20I century.
- Mark Chapman and James Neesham (NZ) scored highest 5th wicket partnership in a T20I (121*).
- This was New Zealand's 100th T20I win. (Note: New Zealand won two matches through super over.)

== ODI series ==
=== 1st ODI ===
27 April 2023
15:30 (D/N)
Scorecard

New Zealand; 288/7 (50 overs)	v	Pakistan; 291/5 (48.3 overs)
Daryl Mitchell 113 (115); Naseem Shah 2/29 (10 overs)		Fakhar Zaman 117 (114); Adam Milne 2/60 (9 overs)

Pakistan won by 5 wickets
Rawalpindi Cricket Stadium, Rawalpindi
Umpires: Aleem Dar (Pak) and Ahsan Raza (Pak)
Player of the match: Fakhar Zaman (Pak)

- Pakistan won the toss and elected to field.
- As a result of this match, Pakistan became the third International side to win 500 ODIs.
- Babar Azam became fastest Pakistani and second fastest Asian batter to complete 12000 runs in International cricket.

=== 2nd ODI ===
29 April 2023
15:30 (D/N)
Scorecard

New Zealand; 336/5 (50 overs)	v	Pakistan; 337/3 (48.2 overs)
Daryl Mitchell 129 (119); Haris Rauf 4/78 (10 overs)		Fakhar Zaman 180* (144); Henry Shipley 1/58 (10 overs)

Pakistan won by 7 wickets
Rawalpindi Cricket Stadium, Rawalpindi
Umpires: Aleem Dar (Pak) and Rashid Riaz (Pak)
Player of the match: Fakhar Zaman (Pak)

- Pakistan won the toss and elected to field.
- Ihsanullah (Pak) made his ODI debut.
- This was Pakistan's second highest successful ODI chase.
- Fakhar Zaman became the second-joint overall and quickest cricketer from Asia to score 3,000 runs, in terms of number of innings batted in ODIs (67), and also became fourth Pakistani batter to score three consecutive centuries in ODIs.

=== 3rd ODI ===
3 May 2023
15:30 (D/N)
Scorecard

Pakistan; 287/6 (50 overs)	v	New Zealand; 261 (49.1 overs)
Imam-ul-Haq 90 (107); Matt Henry 3/54 (10 overs)		Tom Blundell 65 (78); Naseem Shah 2/41 (8.1 overs)

Pakistan won by 26 runs
National Stadium, Karachi
Umpires: Faisal Afridi (Pak) and Langton Rusere (Zim)
Player of the match: Imam-ul-Haq (Pak)

- New Zealand won the toss and elected to field.
- Cole McConchie (NZ) made his ODI debut.

=== 4th ODI ===
5 May 2023
15:30 (D/N)
Scorecard

Pakistan; 334/6 (50 overs)	v	New Zealand; 232 (43.4 overs)
Babar Azam 107 (117); Matt Henry 3/65 (10 overs)		Tom Latham 60 (76); Usama Mir 4/43 (10 overs)

Pakistan won by 102 runs
National Stadium, Karachi
Umpires: Joel Wilson (WI) and Asif Yaqoob (Pak)
Player of the match: Babar Azam (Pak)

- New Zealand won the toss and elected to field.
- Ben Lister (NZ) made his ODI debut.
- Babar Azam (Pak) became the fastest batter to score 5,000 ODI runs, in terms of innings batted (97).
- As a result of this victory, Pakistan moved to no. 1 in ICC Men's ODI Team Rankings.

=== 5th ODI ===
7 May 2023
15:30 (D/N)
Scorecard

New Zealand; 299 (49.3 overs)	v	Pakistan; 252 (46.1 overs)
Will Young 87 (91); Shaheen Afridi 3/46 (10 overs)		Iftikhar Ahmed 94* (72); Henry Shipley 3/34 (9 overs)

New Zealand won by 47 runs
National Stadium, Karachi
Umpires: Rashid Riaz (Pak) and Langton Rusere (Zim)
Player of the match: Henry Shipley (NZ)

- New Zealand won the toss and elected to bat.
- Babar Azam (Pak) played in his 100th ODI.
