= New Zealand cricket team in Pakistan in 2022–23 (December 2022) =

International cricket tour

	Pakistan	New Zealand
- Dates: 26 December 2022 – 13 January 2023
Captains	Babar Azam	Tim Southee (Tests); Kane Williamson (ODIs)

Test series
- Result: 2-match series drawn 0–0
Most runs	Sarfaraz Ahmed (335)	Tom Latham (281)
Most wickets	Abrar Ahmed (11)	Ish Sodhi (13)
- Player of the series: Sarfaraz Ahmed (Pak)

One Day International series
- Results: New Zealand won the 3-match series 2–1
Most runs	Mohammad Rizwan (182)	Kane Williamson (164)
Most wickets	Naseem Shah (8)	Tim Southee (6)
- Player of the series: Devon Conway (NZ)

The New Zealand cricket team toured Pakistan in December 2022 and January 2023 to play two Test matches and three One Day International (ODI) matches. The Test matches formed part of the 2021–2023 ICC World Test Championship, and the ODI matches formed part of the inaugural 2020–2023 ICC Cricket World Cup Super League.

In April 2022, the Pakistan Cricket Board (PCB) confirmed that the series would be taking place. Following the tour, New Zealand returned to Pakistan in April 2023, to play five ODIs and five Twenty20 International (T20I) matches, to make up for the series that was postponed in September 2021.

In October 2022, the PCB announced the fixtures for the tour. Initially, the second Test was scheduled to be played in Multan, but later shifted to Karachi because of poor weather conditions in Multan. On 24 December 2022, the PCB confirmed the revised fixtures, with all the matches being played in Karachi.

Ahead of the Test series, Tim Southee was appointed as New Zealand's Test captain, after Kane Williamson stepped down from his role.

== Squads ==
Tests		ODIs	
Pakistan	New Zealand	Pakistan	New Zealand
Babar Azam (c); Mohammad Rizwan (vc, wk); Abdullah Shafique; Abrar Ahmed; Salman Ali Agha; Hasan Ali; Imam-ul-Haq; Kamran Ghulam; Mir Hamza; Mohammad Nawaz; Mohammad Wasim Jnr; Naseem Shah; Nauman Ali; Sajid Khan; Sarfaraz Ahmed (wk); Saud Shakeel; Shahnawaz Dahani; Shan Masood; Zahid Mahmood	Tim Southee (c); Tom Latham (vc); Michael Bracewell; Tom Blundell (wk); Devon Conway; Matt Henry; Daryl Mitchell; Henry Nicholls; Ajaz Patel; Glenn Phillips; Ish Sodhi; Blair Tickner; Neil Wagner; Kane Williamson; Will Young	Babar Azam (c); Shan Masood (vc); Agha Salman; Fakhar Zaman; Haris Sohail; Haris Rauf; Imam-ul-Haq; Kamran Ghulam; Mohammad Hasnain; Mohammad Nawaz; Mohammad Rizwan (wk); Mohammad Wasim; Naseem Shah; Shahnawaz Dahani; Tayyab Tahir; Usama Mir	Kane Williamson (c); Finn Allen; Doug Bracewell; Michael Bracewell; Devon Conway; Lockie Ferguson; ~~Matt Henry~~; Tom Latham (wk); ~~Adam Milne~~; Daryl Mitchell; Henry Nicholls; Glenn Phillips; Mitchell Santner; Henry Shipley; Ish Sodhi; Tim Southee; Blair Tickner

On 24 December 2022, Mir Hamza, Sajid Khan and Shahnawaz Dahani were added to Pakistan's Test squad.

New Zealand's Adam Milne and Matt Henry were ruled out from ODI series due to injuries, with Blair Tickner and Doug Bracewell named as their respective replacements.

== Test series ==
=== 1st Test ===
26–30 December 2022
Scorecard

Pakistan	v	New Zealand
438 (130.5 overs); Babar Azam 161 (280); Tim Southee 3/69 (25.5 overs)		612/9d (194.5 overs); Kane Williamson 200* (394); Abrar Ahmed 5/205 (67.5 overs)
311/8d (103.5 overs); Imam-ul-Haq 96 (206); Ish Sodhi 6/86 (36.5 overs)		61/1 (7.3 overs); Tom Latham 35* (24); Abrar Ahmed 1/23 (3 overs)

Match drawn
National Bank Cricket Arena, Karachi
Umpires: Aleem Dar (Pak) and Alex Wharf (Eng)
Player of the match: Kane Williamson (NZ)

- Pakistan won the toss and elected to bat.
- 8.3 overs of play were lost on Day 5 due to bad light.
- Ish Sodhi (NZ) took his maiden five-wicket haul in Test cricket.
- New Zealand scored its highest test score against Pakistan in Pakistan.
- Agha Salman (Pak) scored his maiden Test century.
- World Test Championship points: Pakistan 4, New Zealand 4.

=== 2nd Test ===
2–6 January 2023
Scorecard

New Zealand	v	Pakistan
449 (131 overs); Devon Conway 122 (191); Abrar Ahmed 4/149 (37 overs)		408 (133 overs); Saud Shakeel 125* (341); Ajaz Patel 3/88 (17 overs)
277/5d (82 overs); Michael Bracewell 74* (119); Mir Hamza 1/38 (11 overs)		304/9 (90 overs); Sarfaraz Ahmed 118 (176); Michael Bracewell 4/75 (20 overs)

Match drawn
National Bank Cricket Arena, Karachi
Umpires: Aleem Dar (Pak) and Alex Wharf (Eng)
Player of the match: Sarfaraz Ahmed (Pak)

- New Zealand won the toss and elected to bat.
- Saud Shakeel (Pak) scored his maiden century in Test cricket.
- World Test Championship points: Pakistan 4, New Zealand 4.

== ODI series ==
=== 1st ODI ===
9 January 2023
14:30 (D/N)
Scorecard

New Zealand; 255/9 (50 overs)	v	Pakistan; 258/4 (48.1 overs)
Michael Bracewell 43 (42); Naseem Shah 5/57 (10 overs)		Mohammad Rizwan 77* (86); Michael Bracewell 2/44 (10 overs)

Pakistan won by 6 wickets
National Bank Cricket Arena, Karachi
Umpires: Aleem Dar (Pak) and Asif Yaqoob (Pak)
Player of the match: Naseem Shah (Pak)

- Pakistan won the toss and elected to field.
- Usama Mir (Pak) and Henry Shipley (NZ) both made their ODI debuts.
- World Cup Super League points: Pakistan 10, New Zealand 0.

=== 2nd ODI ===
11 January 2023
14:30 (D/N)
Scorecard

New Zealand; 261 (49.5 overs)	v	Pakistan; 182 (43 overs)
Devon Conway 101 (92); Mohammed Nawaz 4/38 (10 overs)		Babar Azam 79 (114); Tim Southee 2/33 (6 overs)

New Zealand won by 79 runs
National Bank Cricket Arena, Karachi
Umpires: Aleem Dar (Pak) and Rashid Riaz (Pak)
Player of the match: Devon Conway (NZ)

- New Zealand won the toss and elected to bat.
- World Cup Super League points: New Zealand 10, Pakistan 0.

=== 3rd ODI ===
13 January 2023
14:30 (D/N)
Scorecard

Pakistan; 280/9 (50 overs)	v	New Zealand; 281/8 (48.1 overs)
Fakhar Zaman 101 (122); Tim Southee 3/56 (10 overs)		Glenn Phillips 63* (42); Mohammad Wasim 2/35 (5 overs)

New Zealand won by 2 wickets
National Bank Cricket Arena, Karachi
Umpires: Aleem Dar (Pak) and Ahsan Raza (Pak)
Player of the match: Glenn Phillips (NZ)

- Pakistan won the toss and elected to bat.
- Kamran Ghulam (Pak) made his ODI debut as concussion substitute for Haris Sohail.
- World Cup Super League points: New Zealand 10, Pakistan 0.
