= New Zealand cricket team in Pakistan in 2021–22 =

International cricket tour

	Pakistan	New Zealand
- Dates: 17 September – 3 October 2021
Captains	Babar Azam	Tom Latham

One Day International series

Twenty20 International series

The New Zealand cricket team toured Pakistan in September and October 2021, and were scheduled to play three One Day International (ODI) and five Twenty20 International (T20I) matches. It was New Zealand's first tour of Pakistan since 2003. However, on the morning of the first ODI match, New Zealand Cricket (NZC) raised a security alert with the Pakistan Cricket Board (PCB) and the Pakistan Government, which resulted in the entire tour being called off.

In December 2021, both cricket boards agreed to play a set of extra fixtures in Pakistan in April 2023 to make up for the postponed tour, following New Zealand's tour of Pakistan in December 2022.

== Background ==
On 4 August 2021, the PCB confirmed the schedule for the tour. The ODIs were scheduled to take place at the Rawalpindi Cricket Stadium, and the T20Is would have taken place at the Gaddafi Stadium in Lahore. Tom Latham was named as New Zealand's captain, with Kane Williamson being unavailable due to him playing in the rescheduled phase of the 2021 Indian Premier League. After the Taliban took control of Afghanistan in August 2021, several New Zealand players reportedly expressed concerns about touring Pakistan. On 18 August, New Zealand Cricket announced that its players would have the right to pull out of the tour if they "felt uneasy about touring Pakistan even if the tour went ahead".

The ODI series was originally scheduled to form part of the inaugural 2020–23 ICC Cricket World Cup Super League. However, in September 2021 it was announced that due to the unavailability of the Decision Review System (DRS), the ODI matches would be a standalone bilateral series. The World Cup Super League matches were rescheduled for New Zealand's tour of Pakistan in 2022–23.

== Reactions and aftermath ==
Newly-appointed PCB Chairman Ramiz Raja expressed his disappointment on Twitter and said that "New Zealand will hear us at ICC". Former Pakistan fast bowler Shoaib Akhtar also reacted on New Zealand's decision to pull out of the series and said "New Zealand just killed Pakistan cricket". Pakistan's team captain Babar Azam also took to Twitter to express his displeasure over the cancellation of the series, saying he was "extremely disappointed" and stated that he has the full trust in Pakistan's security agencies.

The New Zealand cricket board chief executive David White said in a statement that they had no choice but to call off the tour of Pakistan. White later said that "there was no way we could stay in the country" following the advice they were given, but also thanked the PCB for their professionalism. Former New Zealand all-rounder Grant Elliott also reacted to the news and said, "Sad news for players and fans".

On 20 September 2021, the England and Wales Cricket Board (ECB) announced that both their men's and women's tours to the country in October 2021 had been cancelled, citing issues around wellbeing and concerns of travelling to the region. Australia, which are also scheduled to tour Pakistan in 2022, said that said they are monitoring the situation and will "talk with the relevant authorities once more information becomes known."

== Squads ==
ODIs		T20Is	
Pakistan	New Zealand	Pakistan	New Zealand
Babar Azam (c); Shadab Khan (vc); Shaheen Afridi; Hasan Ali; Iftikhar Ahmed; Faheem Ashraf; Shahnawaz Dahani; Mohammad Haris (wk); Mohammad Hasnain; Zahid Mahmood; Mohammad Nawaz; Usman Qadir; Haris Rauf; Mohammad Rizwan (wk); Abdullah Shafique; Khushdil Shah; Saud Shakeel; Imam-ul-Haq; Mohammad Wasim; Fakhar Zaman	Tom Latham (c, wk); Finn Allen; Hamish Bennett; ~~Tom Blundell (wk)~~; Doug Bracewell; Colin de Grandhomme; Jacob Duffy; Matt Henry; Scott Kuggeleijn; Cole McConchie; Daryl Mitchell; Henry Nicholls; Ajaz Patel; Rachin Ravindra; Blair Tickner; Will Young	Babar Azam (c); Shadab Khan (vc); Shaheen Afridi; Asif Ali; Hasan Ali; Mohammad Hafeez; Mohammad Hasnain; Azam Khan (wk); Sohaib Maqsood; Mohammad Nawaz; Haris Rauf; Mohammad Rizwan (wk); Khushdil Shah; Imad Wasim; Mohammad Wasim	Tom Latham (c, wk); Finn Allen; Todd Astle; Hamish Bennett; Tom Blundell (wk); Mark Chapman; Colin de Grandhomme; Martin Guptill; Matt Henry; Daryl Mitchell; Ajaz Patel; Ish Sodhi; Ben Sears; Blair Tickner; Will Young

Usman Qadir, Shahnawaz Dahani and Fakhar Zaman were named as travelling reserves in Pakistan's T20I squad. Ahead of the tour Pakistan's Mohammad Nawaz tested positive for COVID-19. Pakistan named a squad of twenty players for the ODI series, with twelve of those being selected for the first match.

New Zealand's Tom Blundell was ruled out of the ODI series due to an injury, with Daryl Mitchell named as his replacement.

== ODI series ==
=== 1st ODI ===
17 September 2021
14:30 (D/N)
Scorecard

Pakistan	v	New Zealand

Abandoned
Rawalpindi Cricket Stadium, Rawalpindi
Umpires: Aleem Dar (Pak) and Ahsan Raza (Pak)

=== 2nd ODI ===
19 September 2021
14:30 (D/N)
Scorecard

Pakistan	v	New Zealand

Abandoned
Rawalpindi Cricket Stadium, Rawalpindi
Umpires: Aleem Dar (Pak) and Ahsan Raza (Pak)

=== 3rd ODI ===
21 September 2021
14:30 (D/N)
Scorecard

Pakistan	v	New Zealand

Abandoned
Rawalpindi Cricket Stadium, Rawalpindi
Umpires: Aleem Dar (Pak) and Ahsan Raza (Pak)

== T20I series ==
=== 1st T20I ===
25 September 2021
19:00 (N)
Scorecard

Pakistan	v	New Zealand

Abandoned
Gaddafi Stadium, Lahore
Umpires: Aleem Dar (Pak) and Ahsan Raza (Pak)

=== 2nd T20I ===
26 September 2021
19:00 (N)
Scorecard

Pakistan	v	New Zealand

Abandoned
Gaddafi Stadium, Lahore
Umpires: Ahsan Raza (Pak) and Rashid Riaz (Pak)

=== 3rd T20I ===
29 September 2021
19:00 (N)
Scorecard

Pakistan	v	New Zealand

Abandoned
Gaddafi Stadium, Lahore
Umpires: Aleem Dar (Pak) and Asif Yaqoob (Pak)

=== 4th T20I ===
1 October 2021
19:00 (N)
Scorecard

Pakistan	v	New Zealand

Abandoned
Gaddafi Stadium, Lahore
Umpires: Shozab Raza (Pak) and Asif Yaqoob (Pak)

=== 5th T20I ===
3 October 2021
19:00 (N)
Scorecard

Pakistan	v	New Zealand

Abandoned
Gaddafi Stadium, Lahore
Umpires: Rashid Riaz (Pak) and Asif Yaqoob (Pak)
