= South African cricket team in New Zealand in 2021–22 =

International cricket tour

| | New Zealand | South Africa |
- Dates: 17 February – 1 March 2022
| Captains | Tom Latham | Dean Elgar |

Test series
- Result: 2-match series drawn 1–1
| Most runs | Colin de Grandhomme (183) | Kyle Verreynne (188) |
| Most wickets | Matt Henry (14) | Kagiso Rabada (10) |
- Player of the series: Matt Henry (NZ)

The South Africa cricket team toured New Zealand in February and March 2022 to play two Test matches. The Test series formed part of the 2021–2023 ICC World Test Championship. In September 2021, the tour dates were changed slightly due to COVID-19 quarantine requirements for travelling to New Zealand. In November 2021, New Zealand Cricket confirmed the full dates of the tour.

The initial tour schedule had the second Test at the Basin Reserve. However, on 27 January 2022, New Zealand Cricket announced a change to the itinerary, with all the matches moved to the Hagley Oval.

New Zealand won the first Test match inside three days, by an innings and 276 runs. In their first innings, South Africa were bowled out for 95 runs. It was the first time they had been bowled out for less than 100 runs in the first innings of a Test match since 1932. It was South Africa's second-biggest defeat, in terms of innings, in Test cricket, and their first loss to New Zealand since March 2004. South Africa won the second Test by 198 runs to draw the series 1–1, maintaining their unbeaten Test series run against New Zealand.

== Squads ==
Tests
| New Zealand | South Africa |
|---|---|
| Tom Latham (c); Tom Blundell (wk); Devon Conway; Colin de Grandhomme; Cam Fletcher; Matt Henry; Kyle Jamieson; Daryl Mitchell; Henry Nicholls; Rachin Ravindra; Hamish Rutherford; Tim Southee; Blair Tickner; Neil Wagner; Will Young | Dean Elgar (c); Temba Bavuma; Sarel Erwee; Zubayr Hamza; Simon Harmer; Marco Jansen; Keshav Maharaj; Aiden Markram; Wiaan Mulder; Lungi Ngidi; Duanne Olivier; ~~Keegan Petersen~~; Kagiso Rabada; Ryan Rickelton; Lutho Sipamla; Glenton Stuurman; Rassie van der Dussen; Kyle Verreynne |

Ahead of the tour, South Africa's Keegan Petersen was ruled out of the series due to COVID-19 with Zubayr Hamza named as his replacement.

== Test series ==
=== 1st Test ===
17–21 February 2022 (Note: While five days of play were scheduled for each Test, the first Test reached a result in three days.)
Scorecard

| South Africa | v | New Zealand |
| 95 (49.2 overs); Zubayr Hamza 25 (74); Matt Henry 7/23 (15 overs) | | 482 (117.5 overs); Henry Nicholls 105 (163); Duanne Olivier 3/100 (21 overs) |
| 111 (41.4 overs); Temba Bavuma 41 (73); Tim Southee 5/35 (17.4 overs) |

New Zealand won by an innings and 276 runs
Hagley Oval, Christchurch
Umpires: Chris Brown (NZ) and Chris Gaffaney (NZ)
Player of the match: Matt Henry (NZ)

- New Zealand won the toss and elected to field.
- Sarel Erwee and Glenton Stuurman (SA) both made their Test debuts.
- Matt Henry (NZ) took his first five-wicket haul in Tests, and his figures of 7/23 were the joint-best by a New Zealand bowler at home in Tests.
- Tim Southee (NZ) took his 200th wicket at home in Tests.
- World Test Championship points: New Zealand 12, South Africa 0.

=== 2nd Test ===
25 February – 1 March 2022
Scorecard

| South Africa | v | New Zealand |
| 364 (133 overs); Sarel Erwee 108 (221); Neil Wagner 4/102 (31 overs) | | 293 (80 overs); Colin de Grandhomme 120* (158); Kagiso Rabada 5/60 (19 overs) |
| 354/9d (100 overs); Kyle Verreynne 136* (187); Kyle Jamieson 2/81 (21 overs) | | 227 (93.5 overs); Devon Conway 92 (188); Kagiso Rabada 3/46 (19 overs) |

South Africa won by 198 runs
Hagley Oval, Christchurch
Umpires: Chris Brown (NZ) and Wayne Knights (NZ)
Player of the match: Kagiso Rabada (SA)

- South Africa won the toss and elected to bat.
- Sarel Erwee (SA) scored his first century in Tests.
- Kyle Verreynne (SA) scored his first century in Tests.
- World Test Championship points: South Africa 12, New Zealand 0.
