= New Zealand cricket team in Australia in 2015–16 =

International cricket tour

2015–16 Trans-Tasman Trophy
	Australia	New Zealand
- Dates: 23 October 2015 – 1 December 2015
Captains	Steve Smith	Brendon McCullum

Test series
- Result: Australia won the 3-match series 2–0
Most runs	David Warner (592)	Kane Williamson (428)
Most wickets	Mitchell Starc (13); Josh Hazlewood (13)	Trent Boult (13)
- Player of the series: David Warner (Aus)

The New Zealand cricket team toured Australia from 23 October to 1 December 2015 to play three Test matches and four tour matches. The third match of the series at the Adelaide Oval was the first ever day-night Test. Michael Hussey captained the Prime Minister's XI side for the tour match, and in preparation for the day-night Test, a pink ball was used in this game. Australia won the series 2–0, with victories in Brisbane and Adelaide, with the second Test in Perth being drawn.

Following the conclusion of the Adelaide Test, New Zealand captain Brendon McCullum said that day-night Test cricket is "here to stay" and that "it's a great concept". The Australian captain Steve Smith also had praise for the day-night Test saying that "the whole Test match was a great innovation, it was a great spectacle". Media reaction to the first day-night Test was also positive, with many news outlets praising the innovation. However, following the match the majority of players who took part in the game said that there needs considerable work on floodlit Test cricket. Twenty of the twenty-two players who responded supported the concept of day-night Test cricket but work on the pink ball needed further refinement.

== Squads ==
New Zealand	Australia
Brendon McCullum (c); Ross Taylor (vc); ~~Corey Anderson~~; Trent Boult; Doug Bracewell; Mark Craig; Martin Guptill; Matt Henry; Tom Latham; ~~James Neesham~~; Luke Ronchi (wk); Hamish Rutherford; Tim Southee; BJ Watling (wk); Kane Williamson; Mitchell Santner; Neil Wagner; Mitchell McClenaghan	Steve Smith (c); David Warner (vc); Joe Burns; Josh Hazlewood; Mitchell Johnson (ret); ~~Usman Khawaja~~; Nathan Lyon; Mitchell Marsh; Peter Nevill (wk); Peter Siddle; ~~Mitchell Starc~~; Adam Voges; Shaun Marsh; Stephen O'Keefe; James Pattinson

All-rounder Corey Anderson was ruled out of New Zealand's Test series in Australia because of an ongoing back problem. Anderson was replaced by the uncapped Mitchell Santner for the Test series. Neil Wagner was added to New Zealand's squad after Tim Southee suffered a back injury during the first Test. James Neesham was ruled out of the rest of the series after injuring his back in the first Test. He was replaced by Mitchell McClenaghan. Before the inaugural day/night Test in Adelaide, Shaun Marsh replaced Usman Khawaja and James Pattinson replaced the retired Mitchell Johnson. Stephen O'Keefe was released the day of the Test after the pitch condition was inspected. Mitchell Starc suffered a stress fracture to his right foot during the first day of the Adelaide Test and was ruled out of bowling for the rest of the match.

== Tour matches ==
=== Prime Minister's XI v New Zealanders ===
23 October 2015
Scorecard

New Zealanders; 8/307 (50 overs)	v	(Australia) Prime Minister's XI; 205 (45.2 overs)
Tom Latham 131 (127); Jason Behrendorff 3/56 (10 overs)		Ryan Carters 74 (71); James Neesham 3/23 (6.2 overs)

New Zealanders won by 102 runs
Manuka Oval, Canberra
Umpires: Yohan Ramasundara (Aus) and Paul Wilson (Aus)

- New Zealanders won the toss and elected to bat.

=== Cricket Australia XI v New Zealanders ===
24 – 25 October 2015
Scorecard

Cricket Australia XI	v	New Zealanders
4/325d (90 overs); Usman Khawaja 111* (168); Doug Bracewell 1/52 (14 overs)		8/368 (82 overs); Kane Williamson 68 (80); Billy Stanlake 1/25 (10 overs)

Match drawn
Manuka Oval, Canberra
Umpires: Sam Nogajski (Aus) and Paul Wilson (Aus)

- Cricket Australia XI won the toss and elected to bat.

=== First-class match: Cricket Australia XI v New Zealanders ===
29 October – 1 November 2015
Scorecard

Cricket Australia XI	v	New Zealanders
1/503d (121.1 overs); Aaron Finch 288* (363); Tom Latham 1/7 (1.1 overs)

Match drawn
Blacktown International Sportspark, Sydney
Umpires: John Ward (Aus) and Paul Wilson (Aus)

- Cricket Australia XI won the toss and elected to bat.
- Liam Hatcher, Matthew Short and Mitchell Swepson (all Cricket Australia XI) made their first-class debuts.
- Aaron Finch and Ryan Carters (both Cricket Australia XI) scored their maiden first-class double centuries.
- The partnership of 503 between Finch and Carters set a new record as the highest partnership in Australian first-class cricket history.

The match was abandoned after the Cricket Australia XI's declaration shortly before lunch on Day 2 due to an unsafe pitch. The New Zealanders had become concerned about the state of the pitch after some dangerously high bouncing deliveries late on Day 1; the match continued on the morning of Day 2 with the New Zealanders bowling only its spinners, the Cricket Australia XI declared immediately after Ryan Carters' dismissal, and the match was not resumed.

=== Western Australia XI v New Zealanders ===
21–22 November 2015 (D/N)
Scorecard

Western Australia	v	New Zealanders
13/345d (90 overs); Sam Whiteman 117 (147); Neil Wagner 5/62 (19 overs)		11/426 (89.2 overs); Martin Guptill 103 (109); Andrew Tye 4/40 (10 overs)

Match drawn
WACA Ground, Perth
Umpires: Richard Illingworth (Eng) and Sundaram Ravi (Ind)

- Western Australia XI won the toss and elected to bat.
- New Zealanders had 15 players (11 batting, 11 fielding) and Western Australia XI had 12 players (13 batting, 11 fielding).

== Test series (Trans-Tasman Trophy) ==
=== 1st Test ===
5–9 November 2015
Scorecard

Australia	v	New Zealand
4/556d (130.2 overs); Usman Khawaja 174 (239); Kane Williamson 1/39 (8.2 overs)		317 (82.2 overs); Kane Williamson 140 (178); Mitchell Starc 4/57 (17.2 overs)
4/264d (42 overs); Joe Burns 129 (123); Mark Craig 3/78 (14 overs)		295 (88.3 overs); Brendon McCullum 80 (80); Nathan Lyon 3/63 (21 overs)

Australia won by 208 runs
The Gabba, Brisbane
Umpires: Richard Illingworth (Eng) and Nigel Llong (Eng)
Player of the match: David Warner (Aus)

- Australia won the toss and elected to bat.
- Play on Day 4 was delayed by rain at 11:50 and lunch was taken. Play eventually resumed at 13:20.
- Play was again delayed at 15:50 and no further play was possible for the rest of Day 4 due to rain.
- Usman Khawaja and Joe Burns (both Aus) made their maiden Test centuries.
- Australia made their highest total on the first day of a Test match at the Gabba, with 389 runs.
- Joe Burns and David Warner (Aus) became the first opening combination in Test history to post partnerships of 150 runs or more in both innings of a match.
- David Warner (Aus) became only the third player in Test history, after Sunil Gavaskar (Ind) & Ricky Ponting (Aus), to score hundreds in both innings of a match thrice.

The first Test of the series resulted in a dominant Australian victory. After winning the toss, Australia on back of centuries from David Warner and Usman Khawaja and half centuries from Joe Burns and Adam Voges declared their innings at 4/556. New Zealand in reply had a steady start before a middle-order collapse left them struggling at the end of day 2. However, Kane Williamson's 140 meant that Australia didn't enforce the follow-on. However, Warner's second century and Burns maiden ton resulted in New Zealand being set a target of 504 runs. Another middle-order collapse meant that despite rain interruptions on day 3 and day 4 Australia comfortably won the Test by 208 runs.

=== 2nd Test ===
13–17 November 2015
Scorecard

Australia	v	New Zealand
9/559d (133 overs); David Warner 253 (286); Mark Craig 3/123 (23 overs)		624 (153.5 overs); Ross Taylor 290 (374); Mitchell Starc 4/119 (37 overs)
7/385d (103 overs); Steve Smith 138 (185); Tim Southee 4/97 (25 overs)		2/104 (28 overs); Ross Taylor 36* (35); Mitchell Johnson 2/20 (6 overs)

Match drawn
WACA Ground, Perth
Umpires: Nigel Llong (Eng) and Sundaram Ravi (Ind)
Player of the match: Ross Taylor (NZ)

- Australia won the toss and elected to bat.
- Rain stopped play on Day 5 at 14:50 and tea was taken. Play continued to be delayed after tea until it resumed at 16:20.
- David Warner (Aus) scored his maiden Test double-hundred and also completed 4,000 Test career runs (in 84 innings) as the 4th fastest Australian batsman.
- David Warner (Aus) became only the second opener in Test history, after Sunil Gavaskar (Ind), to score three consecutive Test hundreds twice.
- Kane Williamson (NZ) became the third Kiwi batsman, after Martin Crowe & Andrew Jones, to score two Test hundreds in Australia.
- Kane Williamson and Ross Taylor recorded the highest partnership of 265 runs for New Zealand against Australia in Test history.
- Ross Taylor (NZ) became the first Kiwi batsman to score a Test double-hundred against Australia and the 2nd fastest among his countrymen to reach 5,000 Test career runs (in 120 innings).
- Ross Taylor also achieved the highest individual Test score by any overseas batsman (290, his highest Test score) on Australian soil and the third highest individual Test score by a Kiwi batsman.
- Steve Smith scored his maiden 2nd innings Test hundred and his fourth hundred in five matches as Australia's captain.
- Mitchell Johnson announced his retirement from all forms of international cricket during this match.

=== 3rd Test ===
27 November – 1 December 2015 (D/N)
Scorecard

New Zealand	v	Australia
202 (65.2 overs); Tom Latham 50 (103); Mitchell Starc 3/24 (9 overs)		224 (72.1 overs); Peter Nevill 66 (110); Doug Bracewell 3/18 (12.1 overs)
208 (62.5 overs); Mitchell Santner 45 (88); Josh Hazlewood 6/70 (24.5 overs)		187/7 (51 overs); Shaun Marsh 49 (117); Trent Boult 5/60 (16 overs)

Australia won by 3 wickets
Adelaide Oval, Adelaide
Umpires: Richard Illingworth (Eng) and Sundaram Ravi (Ind)
Player of the match: Josh Hazlewood (Aus)

- New Zealand won the toss and elected to bat.
- Mitchell Santner (NZ) made his Test debut.
- This was the first ever day/night Test match in the history of Test cricket.
- Peter Siddle (Aus) became the 15th Australian bowler to take 200 Test wickets.
- The 74-run partnership between Peter Nevill and Nathan Lyon is the equal highest 9th wicket partnership for Australia against New Zealand.
