= 2021–2023 World Test Championship =

Second edition of World Test Championship

2021–2023 ICC World Test Championship
- Dates: 4 August 2021 – 11 June 2023
- Administrator: International Cricket Council
- Cricket format: Test cricket
- Tournament format(s): League and Final
- Champions: Australia (1st title)
- Runners-up: India
- Participants: 9
- Matches: 70
- Most runs: (England) Joe Root (1915)
- Most wickets: (Australia) Nathan Lyon (88)
- Official website: ICC World Test Championship

The 2021–2023 ICC World Test Championship was the second edition of the ICC World Test Championship of Test cricket. It started on 4 August 2021, and it finished with the final on 7–11 June 2023 at The Oval, London, played between Australia and India.

The five-match Pataudi Trophy between England and India, started 4 August 2021, started the second cycle of the World Test Championship. That series, along with the Ashes in December 2021, were the only two series comprising five Tests in the second WTC cycle. New Zealand were the defending champions. In September 2022, the International Cricket Council (ICC) announced that the final of this edition of the World Test Championship would be played at The Oval, London in June 2023. That final saw Australia win by 209 runs, thus becoming the only team to win all ICC titles.

== Format ==
The tournament was played over two years, with 69 matches over 27 series scheduled for the league stage from which the top two teams advanced to a final. Each team was scheduled to play six series, with three at home and three away. Each series consisted of two to five Test matches. Each participant played between 12 and 22 matches. Each match was scheduled for a duration of five days.

=== Points system ===
The points system was changed from the previous edition. In this edition, 12 points would be available each match regardless of how many matches there were in a series. A win was worth all 12 points, a tie was worth 6 points each, a draw was worth 4 points each, and a loss was worth 0 points. Teams failing to meet the required over rate would have one point deducted for each over they were behind at the end of a match, except in cases where they bowled their opponents out in 60 overs in an innings, or 120 overs over the course of the match. As in the previous edition, teams were ranked in the league table based on percentage of total points won out of total points contested.

Points system
Match result	Points earned	Points contested	Percentage of points won
Win	12	12	100
Tie	6	12	50
Draw	4	12	33.33
Loss	0	12	0

Points available per series
Matches in series	Total points available
2	24
3	36
4	48
5	60

== Participants ==
Nine full members of the ICC participated in the competition:

- Australia
- Bangladesh
- England
- India
- New Zealand
- Pakistan
- South Africa
- Sri Lanka
- West Indies

The three full members of the ICC who did not participate were Afghanistan, Ireland and Zimbabwe.

== Broadcasters ==
List of Broadcasters
Country	TV	Radio
Australia	Seven Network	SEN
UK	Sky Sports	BBC
USA and Canada	Willow	
India	Star Sports	All India Radio
New Zealand	Sky Sports	NZME Radio
Sub Saharan Africa	Supersport	

== Schedule ==
The schedule for the World Test Championship was announced by the International Cricket Council (ICC) on 20 June 2018, as part of the 2018–2023 Future Tours Programme. Rather than being a full round-robin tournament in which everyone played everyone else equally, each team played only six of the other eight, as in the previous cycle.

Home \ Away	AUS	BAN	ENG	IND	NZL	PAK	RSA	SRI	WIN
Australia	—	—	4–0 [5]	—	—	—	2–0 [3]	—	2–0 [2]
Bangladesh	—	—	—	0–2 [2]	—	0–2 [2]	—	0–1 [2]	—
England	—	—	—	2–2 [5] (Note: The final test was originally scheduled to start on 10 September 2021 at Old Trafford, but was rescheduled to 1 July 2022 at Edgbaston due to COVID-19 cases in the Indian camp.)	3–0 [3]	—	2–1 [3]	—	—
India	2–1 [4]	—	—	—	1–0 [2]	—	—	2–0 [2]	—
New Zealand	—	1–1 [2]	—	—	—	—	1–1 [2]	2–0 [2]	—
Pakistan	0–1 [3]	—	0–3 [3]	—	0–0 [2]	—	—	—	—
South Africa	—	2–0 [2]	—	2–1 [3]	—	—	—	—	2–0 [2]
Sri Lanka	1–1 [2]	—	—	—	—	1–1 [2]	—	—	2–0 [2]
West Indies	—	2–0 [2]	1–0 [3]	—	—	1–1 [2]	—	—	—

Updated to match(es) played on 20 March 2023. Source: The numbers in square brackets are the number of matches in the series.
Legend: Blue = home team win; Yellow = draw; Red = away team win.
Notes:

Team	Scheduled matches			Not scheduled to play against	
Team	Total	Home	Away	Not scheduled to play against	
Australia	19	10	9	Bangladesh	New Zealand
Bangladesh	12	6	6	Australia	England
England	22	11	11	Bangladesh	Sri Lanka
India	18	8	10	Pakistan	West Indies
New Zealand	13	6	7	Australia	West Indies
Pakistan	14	8	6	India	South Africa
South Africa	15	7	8	Pakistan	Sri Lanka
Sri Lanka	12	6	6	England	South Africa
West Indies	13	7	6	India	New Zealand

== Prize money ==
The International Cricket Council declared a total prize money pool of US$3.8 million for the tournament. The prize money was allocated according to the performance of the team as follows:

Position	Prize money (US$)
Winner	$1,600,000
Runner-up	$800,000
Third	$450,000
Fourth	$350,000
Fifth	$200,000
Sixth	$100,000
Seventh	$100,000
Eighth	$100,000
Ninth	$100,000
Total	$3,800,000

The winning team also received the ICC Test Championship Mace.

== League table ==
Pos	Team	Pld	W	L	D	T	Ded	Con	Pts	Pct	Qualification
1	Australia (C)	19	11	3	5	0	0	228	152	66.67	2023 World Test Championship final
2	India	18	10	5	3	0	5	216	127	58.8 (Note: India were deducted 2 points for a slow over-rate in the first Test against England on 4 August 2021, 1 point for a slow over-rate in the first Test against South Africa on 26 December 2021, and 2 points for a slow over-rate in the fifth Test against England on 5 July 2022.)	2023 World Test Championship final
3	South Africa	15	8	6	1	0	0	180	100	55.56	
4	England	22	10	8	4	0	12	264	124	46.97 (Note: England were deducted 2 points for a slow over-rate in the first Test against India on 4 August 2021, 8 points for a slow over-rate in the first Test against Australia on 11 December 2021, and 2 points for a slow over-rate in the second Test against New Zealand on 14 June 2022.)	
5	Sri Lanka	12	5	6	1	0	0	144	64	44.44	
6	New Zealand	14	5	6	3	0	0	156	60	38.46	
7	Pakistan	14	4	6	4	0	0	168	64	38.10	
8	West Indies	13	4	7	2	0	2	156	54	34.62 (Note: The West Indies were deducted 2 points for a slow over-rate in the first Test against England on 8 March 2022.)	
9	Bangladesh	12	1	10	1	0	0	144	16	11.11	

Source: International Cricket Council, ESPNcricinfo

== League stage ==
=== 2021 ===
==== Pataudi Trophy (England v India) ====
4–8 August 2021
Scorecard

England; 183 (65.4 overs) & 303 (85.5 overs)	v	India; 278 (84.5 overs) & 52/1 (14 overs)

Match drawn
Trent Bridge, Nottingham
Points: England 2, India 2

12–16 August 2021
Scorecard

India; 364 (126.1 overs) & 298/8d (109.3 overs)	v	England; 391 (128 overs) & 120 (51.5 overs)

India won by 151 runs
Lord's, London
Points: India 12, England 0

25–29 August 2021
Scorecard

India; 78 (40.4 overs) & 278 (99.3 overs)	v	England; 432 (132.2 overs)

England won by an innings and 76 runs
Headingley, Leeds
Points: England 12, India 0

2–6 September 2021
Scorecard

India; 191 (61.3 overs) & 466 (148.2 overs)	v	England; 290 (84 overs) & 210 (92.2 overs)

India won by 157 runs
The Oval, London
Points: India 12, England 0

1–5 July 2022 (Note: The match was originally scheduled to be played from 10 to 14 September 2021 at Old Trafford, but was rescheduled due to COVID-19 cases in the Indian camp.)
Scorecard

India; 416 (84.5 overs) & 245 (81.5 overs)	v	England; 284 (61.3 overs) & 378/3 (76.4 overs)

England won by 7 wickets
Edgbaston, Birmingham
Points: England 12, India −2

==== West Indies v Pakistan ====
12–16 August 2021
Scorecard

Pakistan; 217 (70.3 overs) & 203 (83.4 overs)	v	West Indies; 253 (89.4 overs) & 168/9 (56.5 overs)

West Indies won by 1 wicket
Sabina Park, Kingston
Points: West Indies 12, Pakistan 0

20–24 August 2021
Scorecard

Pakistan; 302/9d (110 overs) & 176/6d (27.2 overs)	v	West Indies; 150 (51.3 overs) & 219 (83.2 overs)

Pakistan won by 109 runs
Sabina Park, Kingston
Points: Pakistan 12, West Indies 0

=== 2021–22 ===
==== Sobers–Tissera Trophy (Sri Lanka v West Indies) ====
21–25 November 2021
Scorecard

Sri Lanka; 386 (133.5 overs) & 191/4d (40.5 overs)	v	West Indies; 230 (85.5 overs) & 160 (79 overs)

Sri Lanka won by 187 runs
Galle International Stadium, Galle
Points: Sri Lanka 12, West Indies 0

29 November – 3 December 2021
Scorecard

Sri Lanka; 204 (61.3 overs) & 345/9d (121.4 overs)	v	West Indies; 253 (104.2 overs) & 132 (56.1 overs)

Sri Lanka won by 164 runs
Galle International Stadium, Galle
Points: Sri Lanka 12, West Indies 0

==== India v New Zealand ====
25–29 November 2021
Scorecard

India; 345 (111.1 overs) & 234/7d (81 overs)	v	New Zealand; 296 (142.3 overs) & 165/9 (98 overs)

Match drawn
Green Park Stadium, Kanpur
Points: India 4, New Zealand 4

3–7 December 2021
Scorecard

India; 325 (109.5 overs) & 276/7d (70 overs)	v	New Zealand; 62 (28.1 overs) & 167 (56.3 overs)

India won by 372 runs
Wankhede Stadium, Mumbai
Points: India 12, New Zealand 0

==== Bangladesh v Pakistan ====
26–30 November 2021
Scorecard

Bangladesh; 330 (114.4 overs) & 157 (56.2 overs)	v	Pakistan; 286 (115.4 overs) & 203/2 (58.3 overs)

Pakistan won by 8 wickets
Zahur Ahmed Chowdhury Stadium, Chittagong
Points: Pakistan 12, Bangladesh 0

4–8 December 2021
Scorecard

Pakistan; 300/4d (98.3 overs)	v	Bangladesh; 87 (32 overs) & 205 (84.4 overs) (f/o)

Pakistan won by an innings and 8 runs
Sher-e-Bangla National Cricket Stadium, Dhaka
Points: Pakistan 12, Bangladesh 0

==== The Ashes (Australia v England) ====
8–12 December 2021
Scorecard

England; 147 (50.1 overs) & 297 (103 overs)	v	Australia; 425 (104.3 overs) & 1/20 (5.1 overs)

Australia won by 9 wickets
The Gabba, Brisbane
Points: Australia 12, England −8

16–20 December 2021 (D/N)
Scorecard

Australia; 9/473d (150.4 overs) & 9/230d (61 overs)	v	England; 236 (84.1 overs) & 192 (113.1 overs)

Australia won by 275 runs
Adelaide Oval, Adelaide
Points: Australia 12, England 0

26–30 December 2021
Scorecard

England; 185 (65.1 overs) & 68 (27.4 overs)	v	Australia; 267 (87.5 overs)

Australia won by an innings and 14 runs
Melbourne Cricket Ground, Melbourne
Points: Australia 12, England 0

5–9 January 2022
Scorecard

Australia; 8/416d (134 overs) & 6/265d (68.5 overs)	v	England; 294 (79.1 overs) & 9/270 (102 overs)

Match drawn
Sydney Cricket Ground, Sydney
Points: Australia 4, England 4

14–18 January 2022 (D/N)
Scorecard

Australia; 303 (75.4 overs) & 155 (56.3 overs)	v	England; 188 (47.4 overs) & 124 (38.5 overs)

Australia won by 146 runs
Bellerive Oval, Hobart
Points: Australia 12, England 0

==== Freedom Trophy (South Africa v India) ====
26–30 December 2021
Scorecard

India; 327 (105.3 overs) & 174 (50.3 overs)	v	South Africa; 197 (62.3 overs) & 191 (68 overs)

India won by 113 runs
Centurion Park, Centurion
Points: India 11, South Africa 0

3–7 January 2022
Scorecard

India; 202 (63.1 overs) & 266 (60.1 overs)	v	South Africa; 229 (79.4 overs) & 243/3 (67.4 overs)

South Africa won by 7 wickets
Wanderers Stadium, Johannesburg
Points: South Africa 12, India 0

11–15 January 2022
Scorecard

India; 223 (77.3 overs) & 198 (67.3 overs)	v	South Africa; 210 (76.3 overs) & 212/3 (63.3 overs)

South Africa won by 7 wickets
Newlands Cricket Ground, Cape Town
Points: South Africa 12, India 0

==== New Zealand v Bangladesh ====
1–5 January 2022
Scorecard

New Zealand; 328 (108.1 overs) & 169 (73.4 overs)	v	Bangladesh; 458 (176.2 overs) & 42/2 (16.5 overs)

Bangladesh won by 8 wickets
Bay Oval, Tauranga
Points: Bangladesh 12, New Zealand 0

9–13 January 2022
Scorecard

New Zealand; 521/6d (128.5 overs)	v	Bangladesh; 126 (41.2 overs) & 278 (79.3 overs) (f/o)

New Zealand won by an innings and 117 runs
Hagley Oval, Christchurch
Points: New Zealand 12, Bangladesh 0

==== New Zealand v South Africa ====
17–21 February 2022
Scorecard

South Africa; 95 (49.2 overs) & 111 (41.4 overs)	v	New Zealand; 482 (117.5 overs)

New Zealand won by an innings and 276 runs
Hagley Oval, Christchurch
Points: New Zealand 12, South Africa 0

25 February–1 March 2022
Scorecard

South Africa; 364 (113 overs) & 354/9d (100 overs)	v	New Zealand; 293 (80 overs) & 227 (93.5 overs)

South Africa won by 198 runs
Hagley Oval, Christchurch
Points: South Africa 12, New Zealand 0

==== India v Sri Lanka ====
4–8 March 2022
Scorecard

India; 574/8d (129.2 overs)	v	Sri Lanka; 174 (65 overs) & 178 (60 overs) (f/o)

India won by an innings and 222 runs
Punjab Cricket Association Stadium, Mohali
Points: India 12, Sri Lanka 0

12–16 March 2022 (D/N)
Scorecard

India; 252 (59.1 overs) & 303/9d (68.5 overs)	v	Sri Lanka; 109 (35.5 overs) & 208 (59.3 overs)

India won by 238 runs
M. Chinnaswamy Stadium, Bengaluru
Points: India 12, Sri Lanka 0

==== Benaud-Qadir Trophy (Pakistan v Australia) ====
4–8 March 2022
Scorecard

Pakistan; 476/4d (162 overs) & 252/0 (77 overs)	v	Australia; 459 (140.1 overs)

Match drawn
Rawalpindi Cricket Stadium, Rawalpindi
Points: Pakistan 4, Australia 4

12–16 March 2022
Scorecard

Australia; 556/9d (189 overs) & 97/2d (22.3 overs)	v	Pakistan; 148 (53 overs) & 443/7 (171.4 overs)

Match drawn
National Stadium, Karachi
Points: Pakistan 4, Australia 4

21–25 March 2022
Scorecard

Australia; 391 (133.3 overs) & 227/3d (60 overs)	v	Pakistan; 268 (116.4 overs) & 235 (92.1 overs)

Australia won by 115 runs
Gaddafi Stadium, Lahore
Points: Australia 12, Pakistan 0

==== Richards–Botham Trophy (West Indies v England) ====
8–12 March 2022
Scorecard

England; 311 (100.3 overs) & 349/6d (88.2 overs)	v	West Indies; 375 (157.3 overs) & 147/4 (70.1 overs)

Match drawn
Sir Vivian Richards Stadium, North Sound
Points: England 4, West Indies 2

16–20 March 2022
Scorecard

England; 507/9d (150.5 overs) & 185/6d (39.5 overs)	v	West Indies; 411 (187.5 overs) & 135/5 (65 overs)

Match drawn
Kensington Oval, Bridgetown
Points: West Indies 4, England 4

24–28 March 2022
Scorecard

England; 204 (89.4 overs) & 120 (64.2 overs)	v	West Indies; 297 (116.3 overs) & 28/0 (4.5 overs)

West Indies won by 10 wickets
National Cricket Stadium, St. George's
Points: West Indies 12, England 0

==== South Africa v Bangladesh ====
31 March – 4 April 2022
Scorecard

South Africa; 367 (121 overs) & 204 (74 overs)	v	Bangladesh; 298 (115.5 overs) & 53 (19 overs)

South Africa won by 220 runs
Kingsmead Cricket Ground, Durban
Points: South Africa 12, Bangladesh 0

8–12 April 2022
Scorecard

South Africa; 453 (136.2 overs) & 176/6d (39.5 overs)	v	Bangladesh; 217 (74.2 overs) & 80 (23.3 overs)

South Africa won by 332 runs
St George's Park, Gqeberha
Points: South Africa 12, Bangladesh 0

=== 2022 ===
==== Bangladesh v Sri Lanka ====
15–19 May 2022
Scorecard

Sri Lanka; 397 (153 overs) & 260/6 (90.1 overs)	v	Bangladesh; 465 (170.1 overs)

Match drawn
Zohur Ahmed Chowdhury Stadium, Chattogram
Points: Bangladesh 4, Sri Lanka 4

23–27 May 2022
Scorecard

Bangladesh; 365 (116.2 overs) & 169 (55.3 overs)	v	Sri Lanka; 506 (165.1 overs) & 29/0 (3 overs)

Sri Lanka won by 10 wickets
Sher-e-Bangla National Cricket Stadium, Dhaka
Points: Sri Lanka 12, Bangladesh 0

==== England v New Zealand ====
2–6 June 2022
Scorecard

New Zealand; 132 (40 overs) & 285 (91.3 overs)	v	England; 141 (42.5 overs) & 279/5 (78.5 overs)

England won by 5 wickets
Lord's, London
Points: England 12, New Zealand 0

10–14 June 2022
Scorecard

New Zealand; 553 (145.3 overs) & 284 (84.4 overs)	v	England; 539 (128.2 overs) & 299/5 (50 overs)

England won by 5 wickets
Trent Bridge, Nottingham
Points: England 10, New Zealand 0

23–27 June 2022
Scorecard

New Zealand; 329 (117.3 overs) & 326 (105.2 overs)	v	England; 360 (67 overs) & 296/3 (54.2 overs)

England won by 7 wickets
Headingley, Leeds
Points: England 12, New Zealand 0

==== West Indies v Bangladesh ====
16–20 June 2022
Scorecard

Bangladesh; 103 (32.5 overs) & 245 (90.5 overs)	v	West Indies; 265 (112.5 overs) & 88/3 (22 overs)

West Indies won by 7 wickets
Sir Vivian Richards Stadium, North Sound
Points: West Indies 12, Bangladesh 0

24–28 June 2022
Scorecard

Bangladesh; 234 (64.2 overs) & 186 (45 overs)	v	West Indies; 408 (126.3 overs) & 13/0 (2.5 overs)

West Indies won by 10 wickets
Daren Sammy Cricket Ground, Gros Islet
Points: West Indies 12, Bangladesh 0

==== Warne–Muralitharan Trophy (Sri Lanka v Australia) ====
29 June – 3 July 2022
Scorecard

Sri Lanka; 212 (59 overs) & 113 (22.5 overs)	v	Australia; 321 (70.5 overs) & 10/0 (0.4 overs)

Australia won by 10 wickets
Galle International Stadium, Galle
Points: Australia 12, Sri Lanka 0

8–12 July 2022
Scorecard

Australia; 364 (110 overs) & 151 (41 overs)	v	Sri Lanka; 554 (181 overs)

Sri Lanka won by an innings and 39 runs
Galle International Stadium, Galle
Points: Sri Lanka 12, Australia 0

==== Sri Lanka v Pakistan ====
16–20 July 2022
Scorecard

Sri Lanka; 222 (66.1 overs) & 337 (100 overs)	v	Pakistan; 218 (90.5 overs) & 344/6 (127.2 overs)

Pakistan won by 4 wickets
Galle International Stadium, Galle
Points: Pakistan 12, Sri Lanka 0

24–28 July 2022
Scorecard

Sri Lanka; 378 (103 overs) & 360/8d (91.5 overs)	v	Pakistan; 231 (88.1 overs) & 261 (77 overs)

Sri Lanka won by 246 runs
Galle International Stadium, Galle
Points: Sri Lanka 12, Pakistan 0

==== Basil D'Oliveira Trophy (England v South Africa) ====
17–21 August 2022
Scorecard

England; 165 (45 overs) & 149 (37.4 overs)	v	South Africa; 326 (89.1 overs)

South Africa won by an innings and 12 runs
Lord's, London
Points: South Africa 12, England 0

25–29 August 2022
Scorecard

South Africa; 151 (53.2 overs) & 179 (85.1 overs)	v	England; 415/9d (106.4 overs)

England won by an innings and 85 runs
Old Trafford, Manchester
Points: England 12, South Africa 0

8–12 September 2022
Scorecard

South Africa; 118 (36.2 overs) & 169 (56.2 overs)	v	England; 158 (36.2 overs) & 130/1 (22.3 overs)

England won by 9 wickets
The Oval, London
Points: England 12, South Africa 0

=== 2022–23 ===
==== Frank Worrell Trophy (Australia v West Indies) ====
30 November – 4 December 2022
Scorecard

Australia; 4/598d (152.4 overs) & 2/182d (37 overs)	v	West Indies; 283 (98.2 overs) & 333 (110.5 overs)

Australia won by 164 runs
Optus Stadium, Perth
Points: Australia 12, West Indies 0

8–12 December 2022 (D/N)
Scorecard

Australia; 7/511d (137 overs) & 6/199d (31 overs)	v	West Indies; 214 (69.3 overs) & 77 (40.5 overs)

Australia won by 419 runs
Adelaide Oval, Adelaide
Points: Australia 12, West Indies 0

==== Pakistan v England ====
1–5 December 2022
Scorecard

England; 657 (101 overs) & 264/7d (35.5 overs)	v	Pakistan; 579 (155.3 overs) & 268 (96.3 overs)

England won by 74 runs
Rawalpindi Cricket Stadium, Rawalpindi
Points: England 12, Pakistan 0

9–13 December 2022
Scorecard

England; 281 (51.4 overs) & 275 (64.5 overs)	v	Pakistan; 202 (62.5 overs) & 328 (102.1 overs)

England won by 26 runs
Multan Cricket Stadium, Multan
Points: England 12, Pakistan 0

17–21 December 2022
Scorecard

Pakistan; 304 (79 overs) & 216 (74.5 overs)	v	England; 354 (81.4 overs) & 170/2 (28.1 overs)

England won by 8 wickets
National Bank Cricket Arena, Karachi
Points: England 12, Pakistan 0

==== Bangladesh v India ====
14–18 December 2022
Scorecard

India; 404 (133.5 overs) & 258/2d (61.4 overs)	v	Bangladesh; 150 (55.5 overs) & 324 (113.2 overs)

India won by 188 runs
Zohur Ahmed Chowdhury Stadium, Chattogram
Points: India 12, Bangladesh 0

22–26 December 2022
Scorecard

Bangladesh; 227 (73.5 overs) & 231 (70.2 overs)	v	India; 314 (86.3 overs) & 145/7 (47 overs)

India won by 3 wickets
Sher-e-Bangla National Cricket Stadium, Dhaka
Points: India 12, Bangladesh 0

==== Australia v South Africa ====
17–21 December 2022
Scorecard

South Africa; 152 (48.2 overs) & 99 (37.4 overs)	v	Australia; 218 (50.3 overs) & 4/35 (7.5 overs)

Australia won by 6 wickets
The Gabba, Brisbane
Points: Australia 12, South Africa 0

26–30 December 2022
Scorecard

South Africa; 189 (68.4 overs) & 204 (68.5 overs)	v	Australia; 8/575d (145 overs)

Australia won by an innings and 182 runs
Melbourne Cricket Ground, Melbourne
Points: Australia 12, South Africa 0

4–8 January 2023
Scorecard

Australia; 4/475d (131 overs)	v	South Africa; 255 (108 overs) & 2/106 (41.5 overs) (f/o)

Match drawn
Sydney Cricket Ground, Sydney
Points: Australia 4, South Africa 4

==== Pakistan v New Zealand ====
26–30 December 2022
Scorecard

Pakistan; 438 (130.5 overs) & 311/8d (103.5 overs)	v	New Zealand; 612/9d (194.5 overs) & 61/1 (7.3 overs)

Match drawn
National Bank Cricket Arena, Karachi
Points: Pakistan 4, New Zealand 4

2–6 January 2023
Scorecard

New Zealand; 449 (131 overs) & 277/5d (82 overs)	v	Pakistan; 408 (133 overs) & 304/9 (90 overs)

Match drawn
National Bank Cricket Arena, Karachi
Points: Pakistan 4, New Zealand 4

==== Border–Gavaskar Trophy (India v Australia) ====
9–13 February 2023
Scorecard

Australia; 177 (63.5 overs) & 91 (32.3 overs)	v	India; 400 (139.3 overs)

India won by an innings and 132 runs
Vidarbha Cricket Association Stadium, Nagpur
Points: India 12, Australia 0

17–21 February 2023
Scorecard

Australia; 263 (78.4 overs) & 113 (31.1 overs)	v	India; 262 (83.3 overs) & 118/4 (26.4 overs)

India won by 6 wickets
Arun Jaitley Stadium, Delhi
Points: India 12, Australia 0

1–5 March 2023
Scorecard

India; 109 (33.2 overs) & 163 (60.3 overs)	v	Australia; 197 (76.3 overs) & 78/1 (18.5 overs)

Australia won by 9 wickets
Holkar Stadium, Indore
Points: Australia 12, India 0

9–13 March 2023
Scorecard

Australia; 480 (167.2 overs) & 175/2 (78.1 overs)	v	India; 571 (178.5 overs)

Match drawn
Narendra Modi Stadium, Ahmedabad
Points: India 4, Australia 4

==== Sir Vivian Richards Trophy (South Africa v West Indies) ====
28 February–4 March 2023
Scorecard

South Africa; 342 (86.3 overs) & 116 (28 overs)	v	West Indies; 212 (69 overs) & 159 (41 overs)

South Africa won by 87 runs
Centurion Park, Centurion
Points: South Africa 12, West Indies 0

8–12 March 2023
Scorecard

South Africa; 320 (92.2 overs) & 321 (100.4 overs)	v	West Indies; 251 (79.3 overs) & 106 (35.1 overs)

South Africa won by 284 runs
Wanderers Stadium, Johannesburg
Points: South Africa 12, West Indies 0

==== New Zealand v Sri Lanka ====
9–13 March 2023
Scorecard

Sri Lanka; 355 (92.4 overs) & 302 (105.3 overs)	v	New Zealand; 373 (107.3 overs) & 285/8 (70 overs)

New Zealand won by 2 wickets
Hagley Oval, Christchurch
Points: New Zealand 12, Sri Lanka 0

17–21 March 2023
Scorecard

New Zealand; 580/4d (123 overs)	v	Sri Lanka; 164 (66.5 overs) & 358 (142 overs) (f/o)

New Zealand won by an innings and 58 runs
Basin Reserve, Wellington
Points: New Zealand 12, Sri Lanka 0

== Final ==
7–11 June 2023
Scorecard

Australia; 469 (121.3 overs) & 270/8d (84.3 overs)	v	India; 296 (69.4 overs) & 234 (63.3 overs)

Australia won by 209 runs
The Oval, London

== Statistics ==
=== Individual statistics ===
The top 5 players in each category are listed.

==== Most runs ====
Runs	Batsman	Matches	Innings	NO	Avg	HS	100s	50s
1,915	(England) Joe Root	22	40	4	53.19	180*	8	6
1,621	(Australia) Usman Khawaja	17	30	5	64.84	195*	6	7
1,576	(Australia) Marnus Labuschagne	20	14	5	52.53	204	5	5
1,527	(Pakistan) Babar Azam	14	26	1	61.08	196	4	10
1,407	(Australia) Steve Smith	20	32	5	52.11	200*	4	6
Last updated: 11 June 2023

==== Most wickets ====
Wickets	Player	Mat	Inns	Runs	Overs	BBI	BBM	Avg	5WI	10WM
88	(Australia) Nathan Lyon	20	34	2299	889.2	8/64	11/99	26.12	5	1
67	(South Africa) Kagiso Rabada	13	22	1411	388.4	6/50	8/89	21.05	3	0
61	(India) Ravichandran Ashwin	13	26	1200	483.5	6/91	8/42	19.67	2	0
58	(England) James Anderson	15	28	1182	519.2	5/60	6/62	20.37	2	0
57	(Australia) Pat Cummins	16	27	1263	451.4	5/38	8/79	22.15	3	0
Last updated: 11 June 2023

==== Most dismissals for a wicket-keeper ====
Dismissals	Player	Mat	Inns	Catches	Stumping	BBI	Dis/Inn
68	(Australia) Alex Carey	20	37	66	2	6	1.837
57	(Cricket West Indies) Joshua Da Silva	13	26	54	3	7	2.192
54	(New Zealand) Tom Blundell	13	26	47	7	4	2.076
50	(India) Rishabh Pant	12	23	44	6	4	2.173
40	(South Africa) Kyle Verreynne	12	20	37	3	5	2.000
Last updated: 11 June 2023

==== Most catches for a player ====
Dismissals	Player	Mat	Inns	Catches	Dis/Inn
34	(Australia) Steve Smith	20	37	3	0.918
31	(England) Joe Root	22	40	3	0.738
24	(England) Zak Crawley	17	32	4	0.750
20	(India) Virat Kohli	17	33	2	0.606
18	(Sri Lanka) Dhananjaya de Silva	11	19	4	0.947
Last updated: 11 June 2023

==== Highest individual score ====
Runs	Batsman	Balls	4s	6s	Opposition	Venue	Match date
252	(New Zealand) Tom Latham	373	34	2	Bangladesh	Hagley Oval, Christchurch	9 January 2022
215	(New Zealand) Kane Williamson	296	23	2	Sri Lanka	Basin Reserve, Wellington	17 March 2023
206*	(Sri Lanka) Dinesh Chandimal	326	16	5	Australia	Galle International Stadium, Galle	8 July 2022
204	(Australia) Marnus Labuschagne	350	20	1	West Indies	Perth Stadium, Perth	30 November 2022
200*	(Australia) Steve Smith	311	16	0	West Indies	Perth Stadium, Perth	30 November 2022
200*	(New Zealand) Kane Williamson	395	21	1	Pakistan	National Stadium, Karachi	26 December 2022
200*	(New Zealand) Henry Nicholls	240	15	4	Sri Lanka	Wellington Regional Stadium, Wellington	17 March 2023
Last updated: 11 June 2023

==== Best bowling figures in an innings ====
Figures	Bowler	Overs	Mdns	Econ	Opposition	Venue	Match date
10/119	(New Zealand) Ajaz Patel	47.5	12	2.48	India	Wankhede Stadium, Mumbai	3 December 2021
8/42	(Pakistan) Sajid Khan	15.0	4	2.80	Bangladesh	Sher-e-Bangla National Cricket Stadium, Mirpur	4 December 2021
8/64	(Australia) Nathan Lyon	23.3	1	2.72	India	Holkar Stadium, Indore	1 March 2023
7/23	(New Zealand) Matt Henry	15.0	7	1.53	South Africa	Hagley Oval, Christchurch	17 February 2022
7/32	(South Africa) Keshav Maharaj	10.0	0	3.20	Bangladesh	Kingsmead, Durban	31 March 2022
Last updated: 11 June 2023

==== Best bowling figures in a match ====
Figure	Bowler	Overs	Mdns	Opposition	Venue	Match date
14/225	(New Zealand) Ajaz Patel	73.5	15	India	Wankhede Stadium, Mumbai	3 December 2021
12/128	(Pakistan) Sajid Khan	47.4	12	Bangladesh	Sher-e-Bangla National Cricket Stadium, Mirpur	4 December 2021
12/177	(Sri Lanka) Prabath Jayasuriya	52.0	5	Australia	Galle International Stadium, Galle	8 July 2022
11/99	(Australia) Nathan Lyon	34.5	3	India	Holkar Stadium, Indore	1 March 2023
11/136	(Sri Lanka) Ramesh Mendis	59.2	14	(Cricket West Indies) West Indies	Galle International Stadium, Galle	29 November 2021
Last updated: 11 June 2023

==== Best batting averages ====
Average	Batsman	Matches	Innings	Runs	HS	NO	100s	50s
75.20	(New Zealand) Kane Williamson	7	12	752	215	2	3	0
72.50	(Pakistan) Saud Shakeel	5	10	580	125*	3	1	5
68.42	(Sri Lanka) Dinesh Chandimal	10	18	958	206*	4	2	5
64.84	(Australia) Usman Khawaja	17	30	1621	195*	5	6	7
61.08	(Pakistan) Babar Azam	14	26	1527	258*	1	4	10
Qualification: Minimum 10 innings Last updated: 11 June 2023

==== Best bowling averages ====
Average	Bowler	Matches	Wkts	Runs	Balls	BBI	BBM
14.57	(Australia) Scott Boland	8	33	481	1249	6/7	7/55
17.65	(Cricket West Indies) Kyle Mayers	10	23	406	978	5/18	7/31
18.19	(Pakistan) Shaheen Afridi	8	41	746	1,558	6/51	10/94
19.67	(India) Ravichandran Ashwin	13	61	1200	2903	6/91	8/42
19.73	(India) Jasprit Bumrah	10	45	888	1973	5/24	9/110
Qualification: Minimum 500 deliveries bowled Last updated: 11 June 2023

=== Team statistics ===
==== Highest team totals ====
Score	Team	Overs	RR	Inns	Opposition	Venue	Date
657	England	101	6.5	1	Pakistan	Rawalpindi Cricket Stadium, Rawalpindi	1 December 2022
612/9d	New Zealand	194.5	3.14	2	Pakistan	National Stadium. Karachi	26 December 2022
598/4d	Australia	152.4	3.91	1	West Indies	Perth Stadium, Perth	30 November 2022
580/4d	New Zealand	123	4.71	1	Sri Lanka	Basin Reserve, Wellington	18 March 2023
579	Pakistan	155.3	3.72	2	England	Rawalpindi Cricket Stadium, Rawalpindi	1 December 2022
(d=declared); Last updated: 11 June 2023

==== Lowest team totals ====
Score	Team	Overs	RR	Inns	Opposition	Venue	Date
53	Bangladesh	19.0	2.78	4	South Africa	Kingsmead, Durban	31 March 2022
62	New Zealand	28.1	2.20	2	India	Wankhede Stadium, Mumbai	3 December 2021
68	England	27.4	2.45	3	Australia	Melbourne Cricket Ground, Melbourne	26 December 2021
77	West Indies	40.5	1.88	4	Australia	Adelaide Oval, Adelaide	8 December 2022
78	India	40.4	1.91	1	England	Headingley, Leeds	25 August 2021
Last updated: 11 June 2023

==== Highest successful run-chases ====
Score	Team	Target	Overs	RR	Opposition	Venue	Date
378/3	England	378	76.4	4.93	India	Edgbaston, Birmingham	5 July 2022
344/6	Pakistan	342	127.2	2.70	Sri Lanka	Galle International Stadium, Galle	20 July 2022
299/5	England	299	50.0	5.98	New Zealand	Trent Bridge, Nottingham	14 June 2022
296/3	England	296	54.2	5.44	New Zealand	Headingley, Leeds	27 June 2022
285/8	New Zealand	285	70	4.07	Sri Lanka	Hagley Oval, Christchurch	13 March 2023
Last updated: 11 June 2023

== Final standings ==
Pos.	Team	Prize money (US$)
1	Australia	$1,600,000
2	India	$800,000
3	South Africa	$450,000
4	England	$350,000
5	Sri Lanka	$200,000
6	New Zealand	$100,000
7	Pakistan	$100,000
8	West Indies	$100,000
9	Bangladesh	$100,000

== See also ==
- ICC Test Championship Mace
- Test cricket
- ICC Men's Test Team Rankings
- 2020–2023 ICC Cricket World Cup Super League
- 2021 ICC Men's T20 World Cup
