= Cole McConchie =

New Zealander cricketer

Personal information
- Full name: Cole Edward McConchie
- Born: 12 January 1992 (age 34); Christchurch, New Zealand
- Batting: Right-handed
- Bowling: Right-arm off-spin
- Role: All-rounder

International information
- National side: New Zealand
- ODI debut (cap 210): 3 May 2023 v Pakistan
- Last ODI: 26 September 2023 v Bangladesh
- T20I debut (cap 89): 1 September 2021 v Bangladesh
- Last T20I: 25 March 2026 v South Africa

Domestic team information
- Years: Team
- 2011/12–present: Canterbury
- 2026: Rawalpindiz

Career statistics
| Competition | ODI | T20I | FC | LA |
|---|---|---|---|---|
| Matches | 6 | 21 | 77 | 105 |
| Runs scored | 126 | 189 | 4,266 | 2,175 |
| Batting average | 42.00 | 18.90 | 35.55 | 29.39 |
| 100s/50s | 0/1 | 0/0 | 11/17 | 1/13 |
| Top score | 64* | 31* | 214 | 130 |
| Balls bowled | 168 | 278 | 4,078 | 2,567 |
| Wickets | 4 | 12 | 63 | 54 |
| Bowling average | 33.75 | 31.25 | 34.68 | 43.14 |
| 5 wickets in innings | 0 | 0 | 0 | 0 |
| 10 wickets in match | 0 | 0 | 0 | 0 |
| Best bowling | 2/18 | 3/15 | 4/46 | 3/28 |
| Catches/stumpings | 3/– | 4/– | 33/– | 35/– |
Medal record
Men's Cricket
Representing NZ
ICC T20 World Cup
| Runner-up | 2026 India & Sri Lanka |
- Source: Cricinfo, 27 June 2026

Cole Edward McConchie (born 12 January 1992) is a New Zealand cricketer who plays for Canterbury as an all-rounder. He made his international debut for the New Zealand cricket team in September 2021.

== Career ==
=== Canterbury ===
McConchie made his debut for Canterbury in a List A match against Otago on 25 November 2011. He played one more List A game for Canterbury that season, before being offered a contract for the 2012–13 season. He made both his First Class and Twenty20 debuts that season.

In November 2016 McConchie, playing only his seventh First Class game, hit his maiden century in a rain-affected draw against Otago.

In 2018, McConchie was named as Canterbury captain.

In June 2018, he was awarded a contract with Canterbury for the 2018–19 season. He was the leading wicket-taker for Canterbury in the 2018–19 Ford Trophy, with thirteen dismissals in nine matches.

In June 2020, he was offered a contract by Canterbury ahead of the 2020–21 domestic cricket season.

=== New Zealand A ===
In November 2020, McConchie was named as the captain of the New Zealand A cricket team for practice matches against the touring West Indies team.

== International career ==
In August 2021, McConchie was named in New Zealand's Twenty20 International (T20I) squad for their tour of Bangladesh, and in New Zealand's One Day International (ODI) squad for their tour of Pakistan. McConchie made his T20I debut on 1 September 2021, for New Zealand against Bangladesh, taking a wicket with his first ball in a T20I match. He played in all five matches in the series, scoring 32 runs and taking seven wickets.

In April 2023, he was named in ODI squad for their series against Pakistan. He made his ODI debut in the third ODI of the series, on 3 May 2023.

In 2026, McConchie was called into New Zealand's squad for the 2026 Men's T20 World Cup, as a replacement for Michael Bracewell.
