= 2014–15 Plunket Shield season =

Cricket tournament in New Zealand

2014–15 Plunket Shield
- Dates: 23 October 2014 – 3 April 2015
- Cricket format: First-class
- Tournament format: Round-robin
- Champions: Canterbury (18th title)
- Participants: 6
- Matches: 30
- Most runs: Stephen Murdoch (998)
- Most wickets: Jacob Duffy (45)

The 2014–15 Plunket Shield was the 89th season of official first-class cricket in New Zealand. The competition started on 23 October 2014, and finished on 3 April 2015. Canterbury won the tournament for the eighteenth time after a victory against Northern Districts in the final round of matches.

== Teams ==
Team	Home Ground(s)
Northern Districts	Seddon Park, Cobham Oval, Harry Barker Reserve
Auckland	Eden Park No.2
Central Districts	Nelson Park, McLean Park, Saxton Oval
Wellington	Basin Reserve, Karori Park
Canterbury	Mainpower Oval, Hagley Oval
Otago	Queen's Park, University Oval

== Points Distribution ==
Result	Points
Won	12
Lost	0
Drawn	0
Tied	6
Abandoned	2

Batting Bonus Points are awarded in relation to the number of runs scored after 110 overs are bowled in the first innings.

Runs Scored	Points Awarded
250-299	1
300-349	2
350-399	3
400+	4

Bowling Bonus Points are awarded in relation to the number of wickets taken after 110 overs are bowled in the first innings.

Wickets Taken	Points Awarded
3-4	1
5-6	2
7-8	3
9-10	4

== Points Table ==
Team	Played	Won	Lost	Tied	Drawn	Bat.	Bowl.	Total points	NR/W
Canterbury	10	6	4	0	0	14	36	122	+5.642
Auckland	10	5	4	0	1	16	39	115	+5.427
Otago	10	4	4	0	2	17	34	99	-3.064
Northern Districts	10	4	4	0	2	16	34	98	-1.616
Wellington	10	4	4	0	2	8	37	93	+3.320
Central Districts	10	2	5	0	3	13	32	69	-3.801
