= Canterbury cricket team =

New Zealand cricket team

Canterbury
- Twenty20 name: Canterbury Kings

Personnel
- Captain: Cole McConchie
- Coach: Peter Fulton

Team information
- Founded: 1864
- Home ground: Hagley Oval
- Capacity: 9,000

History
- First-class debut: Otago in 1864 at Dunedin
- Plunket Shield wins: 21
- The Ford Trophy wins: 15
- Men's Super Smash wins: 1
- Official website: www.canterburycricket.org.nz

Canterbury is a first-class cricket team based in Canterbury, New Zealand. It is one of six teams that compete in senior New Zealand Cricket competitions and has been the second most successful domestic team in New Zealand history. They compete in the Plunket Shield first-class competition and The Ford Trophy one day competition as well as in the Men's Super Smash competition as the Canterbury Kings.

== Honours ==
- Plunket Shield (21)

1922–23, 1930–31, 1934–35, 1945–46, 1948–49, 1951–52, 1955–56, 1959–60, 1964–65, 1975–76, 1983–84, 1993–94, 1996–97, 1997–98, 2007–08, 2010–11, 2013–14, 2014–15, 2016–17, 2020–21, 2025–26

- The Ford Trophy (16)

1971–72, 1975–76, 1976–77, 1977–78, 1985–86, 1991–92, 1992–93, 1993–94, 1995–96, 1996–97, 1998–99, 1999–00, 2005–06, 2016–17, 2020–21, 2023–24

- Men's Super Smash (1)

2005–06

== Grounds ==
Canterbury play their home matches at Hagley Oval in Christchurch and occasionally at Mainpower Oval in Rangiora.

== Current squad ==
As of 29 December 2023

- No. denotes the player's squad number, as worn on the back of their shirt.
- ‡ denotes players with international caps.

No.	Name	Nationality	Birth date	Batting style	Bowling style	Notes
Batsmen
77	Leo Carter	New Zealand	10 December 1994 (age 31)	Left-handed		
3	Chad Bowes ‡	New Zealand	19 October 1992 (age 34)	Right-handed		
8	Ken McClure	New Zealand	25 October 1994 (age 32)	Right-handed		
36	Matt Boyle	New Zealand	12 January 2003 (age 23)	Left-handed	Right-arm leg break	
27	Henry Nicholls ‡	New Zealand	15 November 1991 (age 34)	Left-handed	Right-arm off break	NZC contract
All-rounders
2	Zak Foulkes	New Zealand	5 June 2002 (age 24)	Right-handed	Right-arm medium	
88	Cole McConchie ‡	New Zealand	12 January 1992 (age 34)	Right-handed	Right arm off break	Captain
46	Henry Shipley ‡	New Zealand	10 May 1996 (age 30)	Right-handed	Right-arm medium-fast	
47	Daryl Mitchell ‡	New Zealand	20 May 1991 (age 35)	Right-handed	Right-arm medium-fast	NZC contract
15	Raunaq Kapur ‡	New Zealand	6 February 2004 (age 22)	Left-handed	Right-arm off break	
Wicket-keepers
18	Mitchell Hay	New Zealand	20 August 2000 (age 26)	Right-handed		
48	Tom Latham ‡	New Zealand	2 April 1992 (age 34)	Left-handed		NZC contract
Spin bowlers
	Ish Sodhi ‡	New Zealand	31 October 1992 (age 34)	Right-handed	Right-arm leg break	NZC Contract
Pace bowlers
	Angus McKenzie	New Zealand	17 July 1998 (age 28)	Right-handed	Right-arm medium-fast	
32	Edward Nuttall	New Zealand	15 July 1993 (age 33)	Left-handed	Left-arm medium-fast	
21	Matt Henry ‡	New Zealand	14 December 1991 (age 34)	Right-handed	Right-arm fast-medium	NZC contract
12	Kyle Jamieson ‡	New Zealand	30 December 1994 (age 31)	Right-handed	Right-arm fast-medium	NZC contract
29	Fraser Sheat	New Zealand	29 April 1998 (age 28)	Right-handed	Right-arm medium-fast	
9	Will O'Rourke ‡	New Zealand	6 August 2001 (age 25)	Right-handed	Right-arm fast	
37	Michael Rae	New Zealand	13 June 1995 (age 31)	Right-handed	Right-arm medium-fast	
	Sean Davey	New Zealand	8 April 1993 (age 33)	Right-handed	Right-arm medium	
