= Mitchell Santner =

New Zealand cricketer (born 1992)

Personal information
- Full name: Mitchell Josef Santner
- Born: 5 February 1992 (age 34); Hamilton, Waikato, New Zealand
- Height: 1.83 m (6 ft 0 in)
- Batting: Left-handed
- Bowling: Slow left-arm orthodox
- Role: Bowling All rounder

International information
- National side: New Zealand (2015–present)
- Test debut (cap 268): 27 November 2015 v Australia
- Last Test: 25 June 2026 v England
- ODI debut (cap 184): 9 June 2015 v England
- Last ODI: 15 November 2026 v India
- ODI shirt no.: 74
- T20I debut (cap 66): 23 June 2015 v England
- Last T20I: 1 November 2026 v India

Domestic team information
- Years: Team
- 2011/12–present: Northern Districts
- 2016–2017, 2023: Worcestershire
- 2019–2024: Chennai Super Kings
- 2020: Barbados Tridents
- 2023-present: Texas Super Kings
- 2023: Southern Brave
- 2024–2025: Northern Superchargers
- 2025–present: Mumbai Indians
- 2025: Surrey
- 2026: Trent Rockets
- 2026: Edinburgh Castle Rockers

Career statistics
Competition	Test	ODI	T20I	FC
Matches	33	134	143	69
Runs scored	1,089	1,731	1,117	2,979
Batting average	24.75	26.63	20.30	29.79
100s/50s	1/4	0/3	0/2	4/16
Top score	126	67	77*	126
Balls bowled	5,697	6,206	2,946	10,980
Wickets	80	142	151	141
Bowling average	33.95	34.62	23.35	37.90
5 wickets in innings	2	2	0	3
10 wickets in match	1	0	0	1
Best bowling	7/53	5/50	4/11	7/53
Catches/stumpings	27/–	58/–	52/–	61/–
Medal record
Men's Cricket
Representing New Zealand
ICC Cricket World Cup
Runner-up	2019 England and Wales
ICC T20 World Cup
Runner-up	2026 India & Sri Lanka
Runner-up	2021 UAE & Oman
ICC Champions Trophy
Runner-up	2025 Pakistan
- Source: ESPNcricinfo, 15 November 2026

Mitchell Josef Santner (born 5 February 1992) is a New Zealand international cricketer and current captain of New Zealand Cricket team in limited overs cricket. Domestically, he plays for Northern Districts cricket team. He is a bowling all-rounder who bats left-handed, and bowls slow left-arm orthodox spin. He has been involved in the highest 7th wicket partnership for New Zealand in Tests. Occasionally he plays golf as well. He was a part of the New Zealand squad to finish as runners-up at the 2019 Cricket World Cup. He captained the New Zealand team in the 2025 ICC Champions Trophy, where they ended up as runners-up.

Santner was elevated towards the New Zealand team after a promising 2014–15 domestic season. He was named in the one-day squad for the tour of England following the retirement of Daniel Vettori after the 2015 World Cup as New Zealand searched for another left-arm spin option. Santner was then drafted into the touring squad at the start of the England tour to cover for the absence of the players at the Indian Premier League and made an immediate impression with a well-crafted 94 against Somerset. He was handed his One Day International debut at Edgbaston having played just 19 List A matches for Northern Districts.

In November 2020, Santner captained New Zealand for the first time in an international fixture, leading the team in the third Twenty20 International (T20I) match against the West Indies. He did so again in the first T20I match against Pakistan.

In December 2024, he was named New Zealand's permanent white-ball captain.

== Early life and education ==
Santner was born on 5 February 1992 in Hamilton, Waikato. He was educated at Hamilton Boys' High School.

== T20 franchise career ==
Santner was bought by Chennai Super Kings in 2018 for ₹50 lakhs but due to a bone defect in his knee that required surgery, made his IPL debut the following year. Playing for Chennai Super Kings he hit a 6 from the last ball of the match to defeat the Rajasthan Royals.

In the 2018 IPL auction the left-arm spinner was bought by Chennai Super Kings at his base price of 50 lakh rupees yet missed the whole season due to an injury. Between 2018 and 2024, he was playing for CSK. In the 2022 mega auction, he was bought by CSK.

In February 2022, he was bought by the Chennai Super Kings in the auction for the 2022 Indian Premier League tournament.

In June 2023, shortly after winning the IPL with the Chennai Super Kings, Santner joined their sister franchise, the Texas Super Kings, for the inaugural season of Major League Cricket. During the 2025 IPL Mega auction, Mitchell Santner was bought by Mumbai Indians for 2 cr rupees.

== International career ==
=== 2015–2019 ===
In April 2015, Santner was named in the New Zealand limited-overs squad for the tour of England. He made his One Day International debut for New Zealand on 9 June 2015. His first international wicket was when he trapped fellow debutant Sam Billings for 3. During the fourth ODI in the same series he hit 28 runs off Adil Rashid in one over, which is the second highest runs off one over ever posted in England. He made his Twenty20 International debut in the same series on 23 June 2015.

On 27 November 2015, Santner debuted in his first Test match against Australia, becoming the first player in history to make his test debut in a day/night test match. He hit a boundary off the first ball of his Test career.

For the 2016 World Twenty20 Santner was picked to the New Zealand squad as a premier spin bowler along with Nathan McCullum, who was playing his last international tour. In the first match against host India, Santner won the Man Of The Match award for his brilliant bowling performances, which led his team to win by 47 runs. His bowling performance of 4 for 11 is the best bowling figures by a New Zealand spinner in World Twenty20 as well. He was named in the 'Team of the Tournament' for the 2016 T20 World Cup by the ICC, ESPNcricinfo and Cricbuzz.

Santner and Jeetan Patel became the first pair of spinners to open the bowling in an ODI in the 4th ODI.

On 16 January 2018. Santner bowled Pakistani cricketer Fakhar Zaman with a carrom ball, something he had been working on for some time, but only recently brought into his international repertoire.

In March 2018, Santner was out of the Test series against England, after suffering a knee injury, ruling him out of action for six to nine months. The injury meant Santner's planned spell in English county cricket with Derbyshire and Indian Premier League during 2018 had to be cancelled.

In May 2018, he was one of twenty players to be awarded a new contract for the 2018–19 season by New Zealand Cricket.

Santner made the international comeback against Sri Lanka on 11 January 2019 in the only T20I between the teams before going on to play in four of the five ODIs against India as well as all three T20Is and then two of the three ODIs against Bangladesh later during the same summer. In April 2019, he was named in New Zealand's squad for the 2019 Cricket World Cup.

In November 2019, while playing against England at Bay Oval, Santner scored his maiden test century. His 261-run partnership with BJ Watling became the highest ever 7th wicket partnership for New Zealand in test cricket. He also took 3 wickets in the 2nd innings and became the first New Zealand spinner to take a wicket on home soil since March 2018 with 101 consecutive Test wickets in 11 innings in between having all fallen to seamers.

=== 2020–2024 ===
In November 2020, Santner led the New Zealand team for the first time in a T20 against West Indies at Bay Oval, Mount Maunganui.

In August 2021, Santner was named in New Zealand's squad for the 2021 ICC Men's T20 World Cup.

In 2022, Santner became New Zealand's 24th ODI captain when he led the team in the only ODI against Scotland in Edinburgh.

In the group stage of the 2023 World Cup against Netherlands, Santner's five-wicket haul was the first by a New Zealand spinner in a World Cup match.

On 13 February 2024, Santner is named as Captain for the T20 international series against Australia, with Tim Southee only available for Game 1. In May 2024, he was named in New Zealand's squad for the 2024 ICC Men's T20 World Cup tournament.

In October 2024, when New Zealand beat India in a test series in India for the first time ever, Santner had the fine bowling figures of 7 for 53 and 6 for 104 in the second test at Maharashtra Cricket Association Stadium in Pune.

In December 2024, Santner at the age of 32 was announced as the new New Zealand captain for ODI & T20I, taking over from Kane Williamson, starting with matches against Sri Lanka in late December and early January 2025. Coach Gary Stead said this left Tom Latham to concentrate on the test captaincy.
