= Henry Shipley =

New Zealand cricketer (born 1996)

Personal information
- Full name: Henry Burton Shipley
- Born: 10 May 1996 (age 30); Darfield, New Zealand
- Batting: Right-handed
- Bowling: Right-arm medium-fast
- Role: Bowler

International information
- National side: New Zealand (2023)
- ODI debut (cap 207): 9 January 2023 v Pakistan
- Last ODI: 31 March 2023 v Sri Lanka
- ODI shirt no.: 46
- T20I debut (cap 97): 2 April 2023 v Sri Lanka
- Last T20I: 5 April 2023 v Sri Lanka

Domestic team information
- Years: Team
- 2015/16–: Canterbury
- 2023: Sussex

Career statistics
Competition	ODI	T20I	FC	LA
Matches	8	5	23	47
Runs scored	18	2	862	511
Batting average	3.60	–	26.12	18.25
100s/50s	0/0	0/0	0/6	0/3
Top score	7	1*	82	78
Balls bowled	387	78	3,192	2,041
Wickets	15	2	62	53
Bowling average	23.93	70.50	28.67	37.22
5 wickets in innings	1	0	2	2
10 wickets in match	0	0	0	0
Best bowling	5/31	1/25	5/37	6/40
Catches/stumpings	2/–	0/–	11/–	17/–
- Source: Cricinfo, 24 June 2023

Henry Burton Shipley (born 10 May 1996) is a New Zealand cricketer, who is a right-arm medium-fast bowler. He plays for Canterbury cricket team in domestic cricket.

== Early life and family ==
Shipley was born in Darfield on 10 May 1996, and educated at St Andrew's College, Christchurch. His father James, appeared in one match for Canterbury as 12th man in 1985. He is a second cousin of Burton Shipley, the husband of former Prime Minister Jenny Shipley, and has the middle name Burton after him. His uncle, Mark Priest, also played cricket for Canterbury and New Zealand.

== Domestic career ==
He made his List A debut on 17 January 2016 in the 2015–16 Ford Trophy. He made his first-class debut on 22 October 2016 in the 2016–17 Plunket Shield season. In June 2018, he was awarded a contract with Canterbury for the 2018–19 season. He made his Twenty20 debut for Canterbury in the 2018–19 Super Smash on 23 December 2018.

In June 2020, he was offered a contract by Canterbury ahead of the 2020–21 domestic cricket season.

== International career ==
In December 2022, Shipley earned his maiden-call up to the New Zealand cricket team for their One Day International (ODI) series against Pakistan. He made his ODI debut on 9 January 2023, for New Zealand in the first match of the series. In March 2023, he was named in New Zealand's ODI squad for their series against Sri Lanka. In the first ODI, on 25 March 2023, he took his maiden international five-wicket haul guiding New Zealand to a massive win over Sri Lanka by 198 runs. Later the same month, he was named in Twenty20 International (T20I) squad for the same series. He made his T20I debut in the first T20I of the series on 2 April 2023.
