= 2010–11 Plunket Shield season =

Cricket tournament in New Zealand

2010–11 Plunket Shield
- Administrator(s): New Zealand Cricket
- Cricket format: First-class
- Tournament format(s): Double round-robin
- Champions: Canterbury (16th title)
- Participants: 6
- Matches: 30

The 2010–11 Plunket Shield season was the 85th season of official first-class domestic cricket in New Zealand. The season began on 10 November 2010.

== Table ==
The Plunket Shield will be decided on points at the end of the 10 rounds.

Team	Pts	Pld	W	D	L
Canterbury	41	10	4	4	1
Otago	30	10	4	6	0
Central Districts	29	10	3	5	1
Northern Districts	29	10	3	3	3
Wellington	27	10	2	2	5
Auckland	10	10	1	2	7

== Teams ==
Team	Home ground †
Auckland	Colin Maiden Park, Auckland
Canterbury	Mainpower Oval, Rangiora
Central Districts	McLean Park, Napier
Northern Districts	Seddon Park, Hamilton
Otago	University Oval, Dunedin
Wellington	Basin Reserve, Wellington

== Statistics ==
=== Most Runs ===
Player	Team	Innings	Not Out	Runs	Hundreds	Fifties	Average
Peter Ingram	Central Districts	17	0	858	4	3	50.47
Brad Wilson	Northern Districts	18	3	733	2	5	48.86
Craig Cumming	Otago	16	2	714	3	3	51.00
Derek de Boorder	Otago	14	4	667	2	3	66.70

=== Most Wickets ===
Player	Team	Matches	Overs	Wickets	Average
Neil Wagner	Otago	3	116.4	24	12.75
Graeme Aldridge	Northern Districts	3	113.3	17	16.82
Todd Astle	Canterbury	3	122.4	15	21.00
Ben Wheeler	Central Districts	2	69	14	14.92
Ryan McCone	Canterbury	3	75	14	19.21
Andre Adams	Auckland	3	92.3	14	22.28
Michael Mason	Central Districts	2	85.2	11	16.54
Andrew Lamb	Wellington	3	109	11	31.27
Doug Bracewell	Central Districts	3	93.1	10	32.50
Nick Beard	Otago	3	114	9	38.55

== See also ==
- Plunket Shield
- New Zealand limited-overs cricket trophy
- State Twenty20
- 2010–11 New Zealand one-day cricket competition season
- 2010–11 HRV Cup
