= Blair Tickner =

New Zealand cricketer

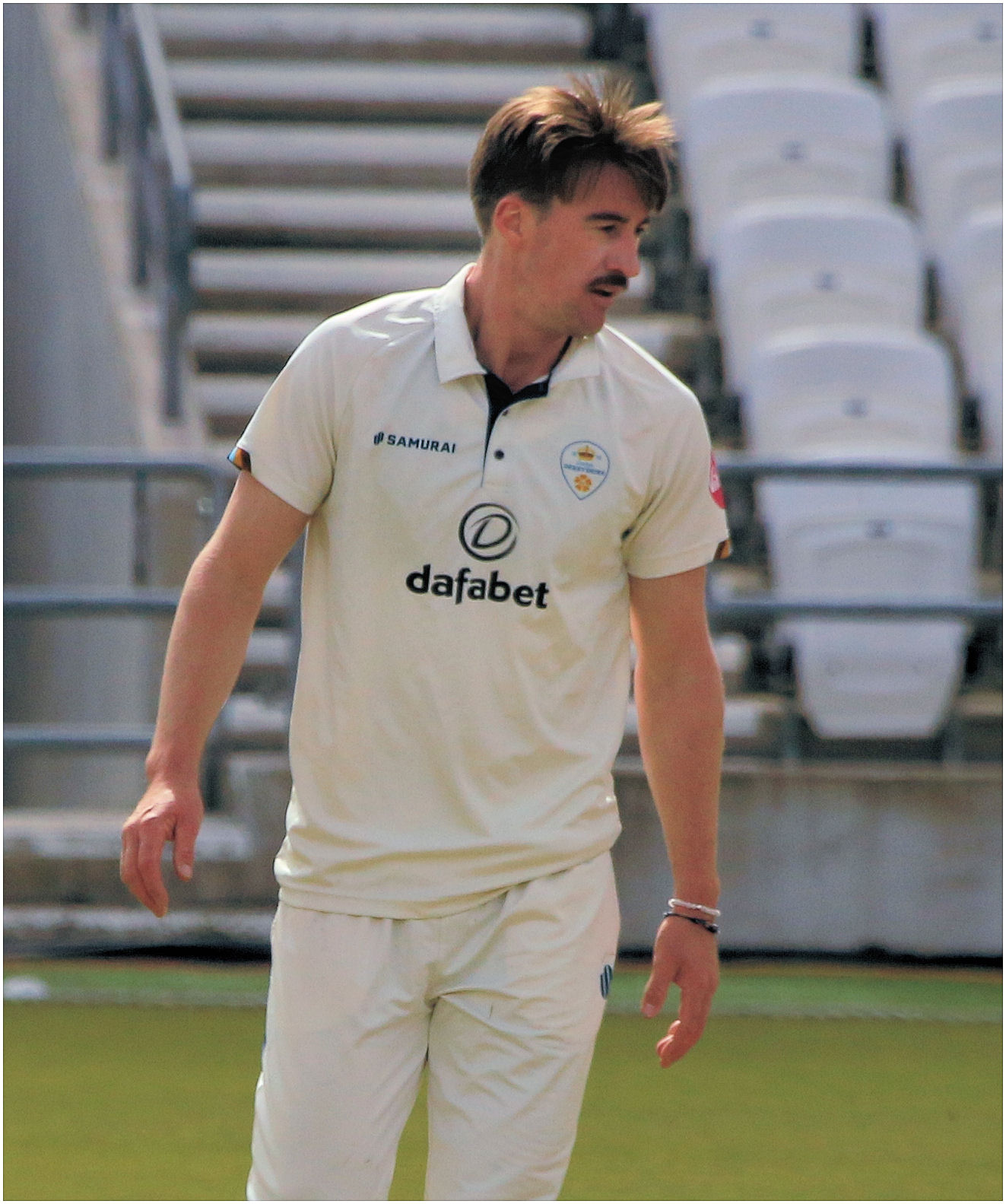
- Tickner playing for Derbyshire in 2024

Personal information
- Full name: Blair Marshall Tickner
- Born: 13 October 1993 (age 33); Napier, New Zealand
- Batting: Right-handed
- Bowling: Right-arm medium-fast
- Role: Bowler

International information
- National side: New Zealand (2019–present)
- Test debut (cap 285): 16 February 2023 v England
- Last Test: 25 June 2026 v England
- ODI debut (cap 202): 29 March 2022 v Netherlands
- Last ODI: 13 November 2026 v India
- ODI shirt no.: 13
- T20I debut (cap 82): 10 February 2019 v India
- Last T20I: 1 November 2026 v India
- T20I shirt no.: 13

Domestic team information
- Years: Team
- 2015/16–present: Central Districts
- 2024–2025: Derbyshire

Career statistics
Competition	Test	ODI	T20I	FC
Matches	6	21	19	93
Runs scored	17	103	11	867
Batting average	17.00	14.71	5.50	13.76
100s/50s	0/0	0/0	0/0	0/0
Top score	8	34	5*	47
Balls bowled	901	911	365	16,410
Wickets	22	30	21	283
Bowling average	27.45	32.50	27.33	33.44
5 wickets in innings	1	0	0	7
10 wickets in match	0	0	0	0
Best bowling	5/76	4/34	4/27	5/23
Catches/stumpings	1/–	7/–	2/–	39/–
- Source: Cricinfo, 15 November 2026

Blair Marshall Tickner (born 13 October 1993) is a New Zealand professional cricket right-arm medium-fast bowler who plays for the New Zealand national team and Central Districts. He made his international debut in 2019.

== Domestic career ==
In November 2017, he took a hat-trick in the first innings for Central District's match against Wellington in the 2017–18 Plunket Shield season.

In the 2017–18 Super Smash, he was the leading wicket-taker, with twenty-one dismissals in eleven matches. In June 2018, he was awarded a contract with Central Districts for the 2018–19 season.

== International career ==
In January 2019, he was named in New Zealand's Twenty20 International (T20I) squad for their series against India. He made his T20I debut against India on 10 February 2019. In February 2020, Tickner was called up to New Zealand's One Day International (ODI) squad for the third match against India.

In November 2020, Tickner was named in the New Zealand A cricket team for practice matches against the touring West Indies team. In August 2021, Tickner was named in New Zealand's ODI squad for their tour of Pakistan.

In February 2022, Tickner was named in New Zealand's Test squad for their series against South Africa. The following, Tickner was named in New Zealand's One Day International (ODI) squad for their home series against the Netherlands. He made his ODI debut on 29 March 2022, for New Zealand against the Netherlands.

In May 2022, Tickner was named in New Zealand's Test squad for their tour of England. He made his Test debut on 16 February 2023, for New Zealand against England. He took 4 wickets in the first test at Mount Maunganui at an average of 31.75 and economy rate of 5.08. He also played 2 tests against Sri Lanka where he took 8 wickets at an average of 38.5
