= Matt Henry (cricketer) =

New Zealand cricketer (born 1991)

- Henry playing for New Zealand in 2026

Personal information
- Full name: Matt Henry
- Born: 14 December 1991 (age 34); Christchurch, New Zealand
- Height: 6 ft 2 in (1.88 m)
- Batting: Right-handed
- Bowling: Right-arm fast-medium
- Role: Bowler

International information
- National side: New Zealand (2014–present)
- Test debut (cap 266): 21 May 2015 v England
- Last Test: 17 June 2026 v England
- ODI debut (cap 183): 31 January 2014 v India
- Last ODI: 13 November 2026 v India
- ODI shirt no.: 21
- T20I debut (cap 65): 4 December 2014 v Pakistan
- Last T20I: 24 October 2026 v India
- T20I shirt no.: 21

Domestic team information
- Years: Team
- 2010/11–present: Canterbury
- 2016: Worcestershire
- 2017: Kings XI Punjab
- 2017: Derbyshire
- 2018, 2022: Kent
- 2023, 2025: Somerset
- 2023–2025: Welsh Fire
- 2024: Lucknow Super Giants
- 2015, 2026: Chennai Super Kings
- 2026: Trent Rockets

Career statistics
| Competition | Test | ODI | T20I | FC |
|---|---|---|---|---|
| Matches | 35 | 96 | 45 | 115 |
| Runs scored | 676 | 272 | 47 | 2,474 |
| Batting average | 15.72 | 10.07 | 5.87 | 18.46 |
| 100s/50s | 0/4 | 0/0 | 0/0 | 0/9 |
| Top score | 72 | 48* | 12 | 81 |
| Balls bowled | 7,642 | 5,004 | 897 | 24,128 |
| Wickets | 152 | 178 | 53 | 534 |
| Bowling average | 26.04 | 24.29 | 24.35 | 22.61 |
| 5 wickets in innings | 8 | 4 | 0 | 29 |
| 10 wickets in match | 1 | 0 | 0 | 4 |
| Best bowling | 7/23 | 6/27 | 3/26 | 7/23 |
| Catches/stumpings | 14/– | 32/– | 10/— | 46/– |
Medal record
Men's Cricket
Representing New Zealand
ICC World Test Championship
| Winner | 2019–2021 |
ICC Cricket World Cup
| Runner-up | 2015 Australia & New Zealand |
| Runner-up | 2019 England & Wales |
ICC T20 World Cup
| Runner-up | 2026 India & Sri Lanka |
ICC Champions Trophy
| Runner-up | 2025 Pakistan |
- Source: ESPNcricinfo, 13 November 2026

Matthew James Henry (born 14 December 1991) is a New Zealand professional cricketer who plays as a right-arm fast-medium bowler for the New Zealand national team and Canterbury.

Since making his international debut in 2014, Henry has been a key member of the national side, contributing to major milestones such as the 2019–2021 ICC World Test Championship triumph and the historic 3–0 Test series whitewash away against India in 2024. Throughout his career, he has also represented various teams in county cricket, the Indian Premier League (IPL), The Hundred, and Major League Cricket (MLC).On June 24 2026 Matt Henry achieved the milestone of becoming No.1 ranked bowler in the ICC Men's Test Bowling Rankings

== Early life and education ==
Henry was born on 14 December 1991 in Christchurch, New Zealand. He was educated at St Joseph's School in Papanui and St Bede's College in Christchurch before completing his sixth form studies at St Joseph's College, Ipswich in England on a one-year scholarship.

== Career ==
=== Domestic and T20 career ===
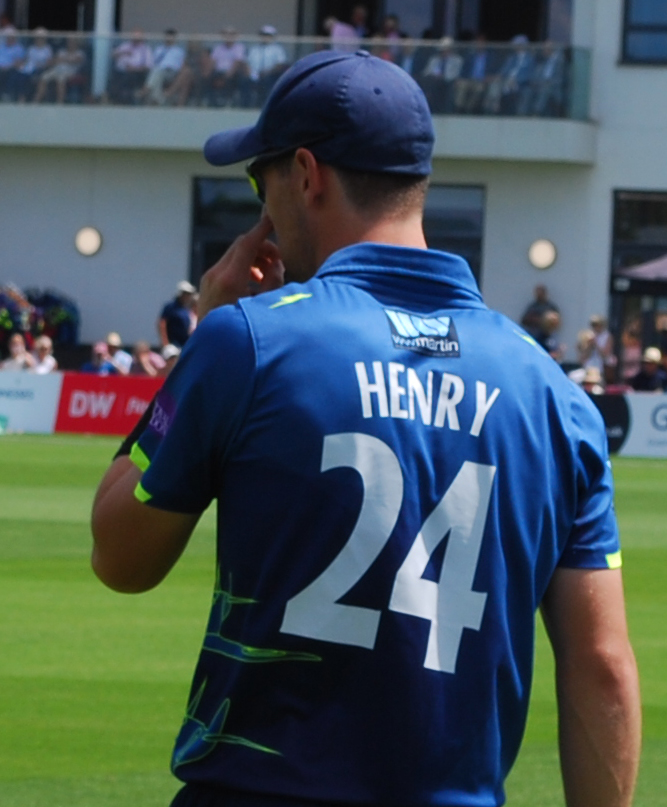
Henry fielding for Kent in 2018

Henry has played for Canterbury in New Zealand domestic cricket since 2011, making his first-class cricket debut in the 2010–11 Plunket Shield against Wellington in March 2011. He has played county cricket in England for Worcestershire for a time in 2016 and for Derbyshire in the 2017 NatWest t20 Blast and played for Kent as their overseas player in the first half of the 2018 season before agreeing to return to play at the end of the season for the club. After taking seven wickets on his Kent debut against Gloucestershire, Henry took his best innings and match bowling figures against Durham in late April 2018. He took five wickets in Durham's first innings and seven in their second to record his first ten-wicket haul with match figures of 12/73. Henry was awarded his Kent cap during his first stint with the club. In November 2021, Henry was again signed to play for Kent, this time for the 2022 cricket season in England.

In February 2017, he was bought by the Kings XI Punjab team for the 2017 Indian Premier League (IPL) for INR 5 million. He had previously signed for Chennai Super Kings in the IPL between 2014 and 2015 but did not play a match for the team.

In July 2019, he was selected to play for the Edinburgh Rocks in the inaugural edition of the Euro T20 Slam cricket tournament. However, the following month the tournament was cancelled.

In February 2023, Henry was signed by Somerset for the County Championship and Vitality Blast until the following July. Henry had a very successful season with Somerset by being the tournament leading wicket taker and taking the winning wicket in the final against Essex to secure Somerset their first T20 title since 2005. In January 2025, Henry re-signed for Somerset to play the first half of the season.

On 16 December 2025, during the 2026 IPL Player Auction, Henry was bought by Chennai Super Kings for his base price of 2 crore, after previously going unsold in earlier rounds.

=== International career ===
Henry playing a Test match for New Zealand against India in November 2026

Henry made his international debut on 31 January 2014 in the fifth ODI against India. He made his Twenty20 International debut for New Zealand against Pakistan in the United Arab Emirates on 4 December 2014.

Despite not being picked in the final squad of 15 for the 2015 Cricket World Cup, he was selected as a replacement for Adam Milne in the semi-final match against South Africa at Eden Park. He was wicketless in the match but against Australia in the final at Melbourne, Henry showed serious pace and took the two wickets of David Warner and Michael Clarke. He batted with Jimmy Neesham to set the record for what is, as of March 2018, the highest 9th wicket partnership for New Zealand in ODIs, adding 84 runs as a pair against India in 2016.

Henry's Test debut for New Zealand came during the tour against England in May 2015.

In May 2018, he was one of twenty players to be awarded a new contract for the 2018–19 season by New Zealand Cricket. In April 2019, he was named in New Zealand's squad for the 2019 Cricket World Cup. On 3 July 2019, in the match against England, Henry played in his 50th ODI. In the first semi-final, New Zealand beat India by 18 runs, with Henry taking three wickets for 37, and being named the player of the match.

In February 2022, in the first match against South Africa, Henry took his first five-wicket haul in Test cricket, with 7/23.

In March 2023, Henry was named in New Zealand's ODI and T20I squad for their tour to Pakistan. On 14 April 2023, in the first T20I, he became the fourth New Zealand cricketer to take a hat-trick in T20Is.

In May 2024, he was named in New Zealand's squad for the 2024 ICC Men's T20 World Cup tournament.
