= Tom Latham (cricketer) =

New Zealand cricketer (born 1992)

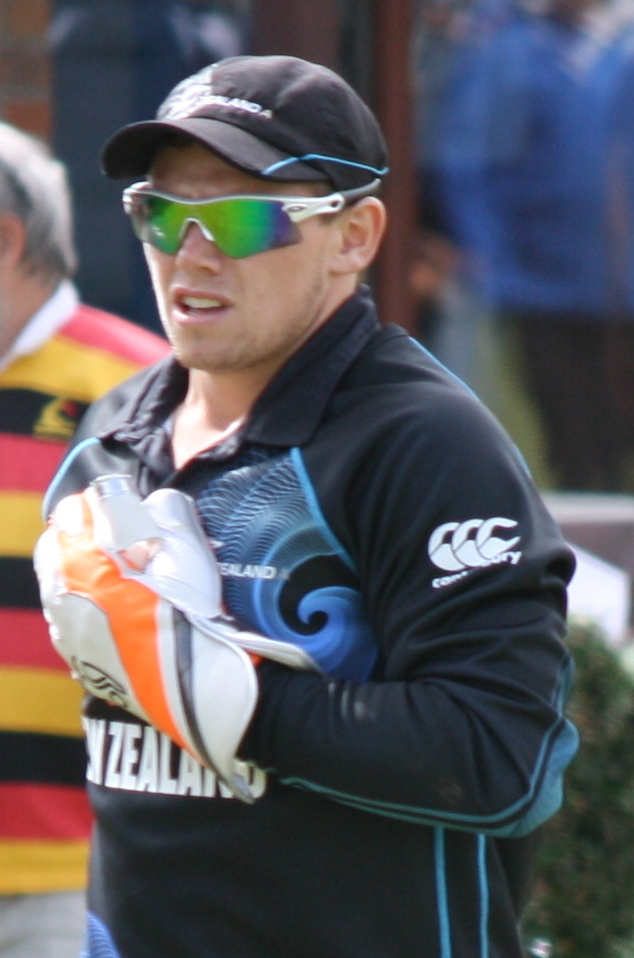
- Latham in 2014

Personal information
- Full name: Thomas William Maxwell Latham
- Born: 2 April 1992 (age 34); Christchurch, New Zealand
- Batting: Left-handed
- Bowling: Right-arm medium
- Role: Wicketkeeper Batter
- Relatives: Rod Latham (father)

International information
- National side: New Zealand (2012–present)
- Test debut (cap 263): 14 February 2014 v India
- Last Test: 25 June 2026 v England
- ODI debut (cap 170): 3 February 2012 v Zimbabwe
- Last ODI: 7 November 2026 v India
- ODI shirt no.: 48 (previously 23)
- T20I debut (cap 55): 30 June 2012 v West Indies
- Last T20I: 20 March 2026 v South Africa
- T20I shirt no.: 48 (previously 23)

Domestic team information
- Years: Team
- 2010/11–present: Canterbury
- 2013: Scotland
- 2016: Kent
- 2017–2018: Durham
- 2023: Surrey
- 2025: Warwickshire

Career statistics
Competition	Test	ODI	T20I	FC
Matches	95	173	29	183
Runs scored	6,450	4,674	597	12,837
Batting average	39.09	33.62	27.13	42.79
100s/50s	17/31	8/27	0/4	32/68
Top score	264*	145*	65*	264*
Catches/stumpings	117/–	150/18	18/5	246/1
Medal record
Men's Cricket
Representing New Zealand
ICC Cricket World Cup
Runner-up	2015 Australia & New Zealand
Runner-up	2019 England & Wales
ICC World Test Championship
Winner	2019–2021
ICC Champions Trophy
Runner-up	2025 Pakistan
- Source: ESPNcricinfo, 7 November 2026

Thomas William Maxwell Latham (born 2 April 1992) is a New Zealand cricket left-handed batter and wicket-keeper who has represented the national team since 2012. As of June 2026, in Test matches for New Zealand, he is the fifth-highest run-scorer, and the highest as an opener. Latham has served as the Test captain since 2024, leading New Zealand in their historic 3–0 away Test series win against India in 2024. He was a member of the national teams that won the 2019–2021 World Test Championship, and finished runners-up in the 2015 and 2019 World Cups and the 2025 Champions Trophy. His father, Rod Latham also played international cricket for New Zealand.

In New Zealand domestic cricket, Latham has represented Canterbury since 2010. He played for several English county cricket clubs including Kent in 2016, Durham in 2017 and 2018, Surrey in 2023, and Warwickshire in 2025.

== Domestic cricket career ==
Latham made his debut for Canterbury in the 2010–11 Plunket Shield season, scoring 65 in his maiden first-class cricket innings. He had played youth cricket for Canterbury, captaining the under-19 team, and played for the Canterbury A team from the 2008–09 season. During 2010 Latham had been a member of the Durham County Cricket Club academy in England. He played matches for Durham Second XI and a Northumberland development XI as well as playing club cricket in the North East Premier League in England for Gateshead Fell.

Latham has appeared in all formats of the game for Canterbury. He spent the 2013 English summer playing in north-east England again, playing for South Shields in the North East Premier League and Scotland in the 2013 Yorkshire Bank 40 competition, the major English List A competition in 2013, as well as making two further appearances for Durham's second XI. He was selected for the touring New Zealand Test squad during the summer and for the T20 squad, playing in both T20 internationals on the tour.

Kent signed Latham as an overseas player for the 2016 English season. He made his County Championship debut against Glamorgan at Canterbury in May, scoring half-centuries in both innings, the first Kent batsman in history to do so on debut. After playing in all three formats of the game for the county, Latham left Kent in mid-July to join the New Zealand team in Zimbabwe.

In 2017 Latham signed as an overseas player with Durham for the second half of the 2017 English cricket season. In 2023, he signed for Surrey, making his debut against Kent at Canterbury.

In November 2024, he signed for Warwickshire County Cricket Club for the 2025 season. After missing the start of the season due to a broken finger, Latham made a century on his Warwickshire debut against Surrey at Edgbaston in May 2025.

== International career ==
Latham scored 24 runs on debut, batting at number five, in an ODI against Zimbabwe in 2012. He made his Twenty20 International debut against the West Indies on 30 July, making 15 and 19 in the series. Latham also played in the tour's ODI series but failed to contribute significantly, his highest score being 32. He was recalled against Bangladesh, where he played a bright innings of 43 while opening the batting, and scored a match-winning 86 off 68 balls during the following tour of Sri Lanka.

He made his Test match debut against India in February 2014, with scores of 29 and 0. He then toured the West Indies with New Zealand in June, playing in all three Tests and two T20s. He had a highly successful Test series, scoring three half-centuries and 288 runs in total, finishing second in the series list of top run scorers, just behind teammate Kane Williamson. In doing so he helped his team to an overseas series victory. By July 2014 he had claimed the spot of opener after a run of poor form for incumbents Hamish Rutherford and Peter Fulton. His first Test century was achieved against Pakistan in Abu Dhabi, on 11 November 2014; he scored 103.

Despite his position as an opening batsman in Test matches, Latham was named as a middle-order batsman and backup wicket-keeper to Luke Ronchi for the 2015 Cricket World Cup. He also shared Test wicket-keeping duties against England with BJ Watling, keeping for New Zealand in the first Test at Lord's following an injury to Watling. When he is not a keeper he generally fields close to the wicket or in the slips.

Latham was selected to tour Zimbabwe in 2015 as an opening batsman. During the second ODI of the series, he scored his maiden ODI century of 110 not out as part of an unbeaten partnership with Martin Guptill of 236 as New Zealand won the match by 10 wickets to level the series. In the third Test against Australia in the 2015–16 Trans–Tasman Trophy, the first ever day-night Test match, Latham became the first man to score a fifty in a day-night Test. During the tour he took the only wicket in his high level playing career, a caught behind to dismiss Ryan Carters who had scored 209 alongside Aaron Finch's 288 not out in a game that was abandoned due to pitch conditions shortly after the wicket.

In October 2016, while playing against India at Dharamshala Latham became the tenth batsman and the first New Zealander to carry his bat in an ODI.

In January 2017 Latham was named as the New Zealand wicket-keeper for the Chappell-Hadlee series. In the first ODI of that series he equalled New Zealand's record of five dismissals as a wicket keeper in an ODI innings. Due to poor form with the bat, however, he was dropped from the ODI team on 1 March during the series against South Africa.

In May 2017 Latham was recalled and named as captain for the Ireland Tri-Series against Ireland and Bangladesh in Ireland with a number of regular players playing in the 2017 Indian Premier League.

In October 2017, Latham was given the wicket-keeping duties against India and moved down to no. 5 due to his ability to play against spin. He scored an unbeaten 103 from 102 balls in the first game of the 3-match series.

In December 2017 Latham resumed his role as acting ODI captain against West Indies with Kane Williamson and Tim Southee rested.

In May 2018, he was one of twenty players to be awarded a new contract for the 2018–19 season by New Zealand Cricket. In December 2018, against Sri Lanka, he made the highest score while carrying the bat in Test cricket, with 264 not out. In April 2019, he was named in New Zealand's squad for the 2019 Cricket World Cup. In July 2019, in New Zealand's semi-final match against India, Latham played in his 150th international match for New Zealand.

T.Latham's record as captain
	Matches	Won	Lost	Drawn	Tied	No result
Test	22	13	8	1	0	0
ODI	47	29	17	0	1	0
T20I	13	6	5	0	1	1

In January 2020, in the third Test against Australia, Latham captained New Zealand for the first time in Test cricket, after Kane Williamson was ruled out of the match due to flu. In February 2020, in the first and second ODI against India, Latham captained New Zealand to win by 4 Wickets and 22 runs after Kane Williamson was ruled out of the match due to a shoulder injury.

In December 2022, during the first Test against Pakistan, Latham scored his 13th century in Test cricket, the most by a New Zealand opener in Tests.

Latham was named New Zealand Test team captain in October 2024.

== List of international centuries ==
Latham has scored 17 centuries in Test cricket and 8 in One Day International matches. His highest Test score of 264 not out came against Sri Lanka at the Basin Reserve in December 2018 and his highest ODI score of 145 not out was made against India at Eden Park in Auckland in November 2022.
