= 2024 in Indian sports =

2024 in Indian sports describes the year's events in Indian sports.

== Archery ==
=== Archery World Cup ===
India participated in the 2024 Archery World Cup from 23 April to 20 October 2024. This was India's 18th appearance at the tournament. India sent a team of 16 archers to compete in 9 events across 4 stages.

==== Medallists - World Cup Stages ====
Medal	Player	Sport	Event	Date	Ref.
1st place, gold medalist(s)	Jyothi Surekha Vennam; Parneet Kaur; Aditi Gopichand Swami	Compound	Women's Team	27 April	
1st place, gold medalist(s)	Prathamesh Bhalchandra Fuge; Priyansh; Abhishek Verma	Compound	Men's Team	27 April	
1st place, gold medalist(s)	Jyothi Surekha Vennam; Abhishek Verma	Compound	Mixed Team	27 April	
1st place, gold medalist(s)	Jyothi Surekha Vennam	Compound	Women's Individual	27 April	
1st place, gold medalist(s)	Dhiraj Bommadevara; Tarundeep Rai; Pravin Jadhav	Recurve	Men's Team	28 April	
1st place, gold medalist(s)	Jyothi Surekha Vennam; Parneet Kaur; Aditi Gopichand Swami	Compound	Women's Team	25 May	
1st place, gold medalist(s)	Jyothi Surekha Vennam; Parneet Kaur; Aditi Gopichand Swami	Compound	Women's Team	22 June	
2nd place, silver medalist(s)	Priyansh	Compound	Men's Individual	27 April	
2nd place, silver medalist(s)	Deepika Kumari	Recurve	Women's Individual	28 April	
2nd place, silver medalist(s)	Jyothi Surekha Vennam; Priyansh	Compound	Mixed Team	25 May	
2nd place, silver medalist(s)	Priyansh	Compound	Men's Individual	22 June	
3rd place, bronze medalist(s)	Ankita Bhakat; Dhiraj Bommadevara	Recurve	Mixed Team	28 April	
3rd place, bronze medalist(s)	Bhajan Kaur; Dhiraj Bommadevara	Recurve	Mixed Team	23 June	
3rd place, bronze medalist(s)	Dhiraj Bommadevara	Recurve	Men's Individual	23 June	

==== Final ====
Athlete	Event	Quarterfinals	Semifinals	Final / BM	
Athlete	Event	Opposition Score	Opposition Score	Opposition Score	Rank
Recurve
Dhiraj Bommadevara	Men's; Individual	(South Korea) Lee; L 4-6	Did not advance		5
Deepika Kumari	Women's; Individual	(China) Yang; W 6-0	(Mexico) Valencia; W 6-4	(China) Li; L 0-6	2nd place, silver medalist(s)
Compound
Prathamesh Fuge	Men's; Individual	(India) Priyansh; W 147-146	(Denmark) Fullerton; L 150^{10}-150^{10+}	(Netherlands) Schloesser; L 146-150	4
Priyansh	Men's; Individual	(India) Fuge; L 146-147	Did not advance		6
Jyothi Surekha Vennam	Women's; Individual	(Estonia) Paas; L 145-147	Did not advance		5

== Cricket ==
=== Men's T20 World Cup ===
India was one of the twenty nations that participated in the 2024 Men's T20 World Cup, co-hosted by Cricket West Indies and USA Cricket from 1 to 29 June 2024. India went on to win their second T20 World Cup title, defeating South Africa by seven runs in the final. India won all their matches and were the first team to win a T20 World Cup while remaining undefeated. They joined England and West Indies as the only teams to win the title twice. Kohli's knock of 76 runs off 59 balls (including 6 fours and 2 sixes) earned him the player of the match award. Kohli, Sharma, and Ravindra Jadeja announced their retirement from the T20I format after the final. On 30 June, the ICC announced its team of the tournament with Jasprit Bumrah being named as player of the tournament for taking 15 wickets with an economy rate of 4.17, and Rohit Sharma as the captain of the team.

==== Group Stage ====
Pos	Team	Pld	W	L	NR	Pts	NRR	Qualification
1	India	4	3	0	1	7	1.137	Advanced to the Super 8 stage
2	United States (H)	4	2	1	1	5	0.127	Advanced to the Super 8 stage
3	Pakistan	4	2	2	0	4	0.294	Eliminated
4	Canada	4	1	2	1	3	−0.493	Eliminated
5	Ireland	4	0	3	1	1	−1.293	Eliminated

Source: ESPNcricinfo
Rules for classification: 1) Points; 2) Wins; 3) Net run rate; 4) Results of games between tied teams; 5) Initial group stage seedings
(H) Hosts

Match 8
5 June 2024
10:30 UTC−4
Scorecard

Ireland; 96 (16 overs)	v	India; 97/2 (12.2 overs)
Gareth Delany 26 (14); Hardik Pandya 3/27 (4 overs)		Rohit Sharma 52* (37); Ben White 1/6 (1 over)

India won by 8 wickets
Nassau County International Cricket Stadium, East Meadow
Umpires: Chris Gaffaney (NZ) and Alex Wharf (Eng)
Player of the match: Jasprit Bumrah (Ind)

- India won the toss and elected to field.
- Rohit Sharma (Ind) scored his 4,000th run in T20Is and 1,000th run in the T20 World Cup, becoming the second Indian to achieve both feats after Virat Kohli. He also completed 600 sixes in international cricket, 100 sixes in ICC tournaments and 300 wins in international cricket.
- Rishabh Pant (Ind) scored his 1,000th run in T20Is.
- Rohit Sharma broke MS Dhoni's record of most wins as Indian Captain in T20Is.

Match 19
9 June 2024
10:30 UTC−4
Scorecard

India; 119 (19 overs)	v	Pakistan; 113/7 (20 overs)
Rishabh Pant 42 (31); Naseem Shah 3/21 (4 overs)		Mohammad Rizwan 31 (44); Jasprit Bumrah 3/14 (4 overs)

India won by 6 runs
Nassau County International Cricket Stadium, East Meadow
Umpires: Richard Illingworth (Eng) and Rod Tucker (Aus)
Player of the match: Jasprit Bumrah (Ind)

- Pakistan won the toss and elected to field.
- Mohammad Rizwan (Pak) played in his 100th T20I match.

Match 25
12 June 2024
10:30 UTC−4
Scorecard

United States; 110/8 (20 overs)	v	India; 111/3 (18.2 overs)
Nitish Kumar 27 (23); Arshdeep Singh 4/9 (4 overs)		Suryakumar Yadav 50* (49); Saurabh Netravalkar 2/18 (4 overs)

India won by 7 wickets
Nassau County International Cricket Stadium, East Meadow
Umpires: Sam Nogajski (Aus) and Paul Reiffel (Aus)
Player of the match: Arshdeep Singh (Ind)

- India won the toss and elected to field.
- This was the first time India and United States faced each other in T20Is.
- India qualified for the Super 8 as a result of this match.

Match 33
15 June 2024
10:30 UTC−4
Scorecard

Canada	v	India

Match abandoned
Central Broward Park, Lauderhill
Umpires: Richard Kettleborough (Eng) and Sharfuddoula (Ban)

- No toss.
- No play was possible because of rain.

==== Super 8 ====
Pos	Team	Pld	W	L	NR	Pts	NRR	Qualification
1	India	3	3	0	0	6	2.017	Advanced to the knockout stage
2	Afghanistan	3	2	1	0	4	−0.305	Advanced to the knockout stage
3	Australia	3	1	2	0	2	−0.331	Eliminated
4	Bangladesh	3	0	3	0	0	−1.709	Eliminated

Source: ESPNcricinfo
Rules for classification: 1) Points; 2) Wins; 3) Net run rate; 4) Results of games between tied teams; 5) T20I Rankings ahead of the tournament

Match 43
20 June 2024
10:30 UTC−4
Scorecard

India; 181/8 (20 overs)	v	Afghanistan; 134 (20 overs)
Suryakumar Yadav 53 (28); Rashid Khan 3/26 (4 overs)		Azmatullah Omarzai 26 (20); Jasprit Bumrah 3/7 (4 overs)

India won by 47 runs
Kensington Oval, Bridgetown
Umpires: Paul Reiffel (Aus) and Rod Tucker (Aus)
Player of the match: Suryakumar Yadav (Ind)

- India won the toss and elected to bat.

Match 47
22 June 2024
10:30 UTC−4
Scorecard

India; 196/5 (20 overs)	v	Bangladesh; 146/8 (20 overs)
Hardik Pandya 50* (27); Tanzim Hasan Sakib 2/32 (4 overs)		Najmul Hossain Shanto 40 (32); Kuldeep Yadav 3/19 (4 overs)

India won by 50 runs
Sir Vivian Richards Stadium, North Sound
Umpires: Michael Gough (Eng) and Adrian Holdstock (SA)
Player of the match: Hardik Pandya (Ind)

- Bangladesh won the toss and elected to field.
- Shakib Al Hasan (Ban) became the first bowler to take 50 wickets in T20 World Cup history.

Match 51
24 June 2024
10:30 UTC−4
Scorecard

India; 205/5 (20 overs)	v	Australia; 181/7 (20 overs)
Rohit Sharma 92 (41); Mitchell Starc 2/45 (4 overs)		Travis Head 76 (43); Arshdeep Singh 3/37 (4 overs)

India won by 24 runs
Daren Sammy Cricket Ground, Gros Islet
Umpires: Richard Illingworth (Eng) and Richard Kettleborough (Eng)
Player of the match: Rohit Sharma (Ind)

- Australia won the toss and elected to field.
- David Warner (Aus) played in his last T20I.
- Rohit Sharma (Ind) became the first player to hit 200 sixes in T20Is. He also became the highest run-scorer in T20Is, surpassing Babar Azam.
- India qualified for the semi-finals as a result of this match.

==== Semi-final ====
27 June 2024
10:30 UTC−4
Scorecard

India; 171/7 (20 overs)	v	England; 103 (16.4 overs)
Rohit Sharma 57 (39); Chris Jordan 3/37 (3 overs)		Harry Brook 25 (19); Kuldeep Yadav 3/19 (4 overs)

India won by 68 runs
Providence Stadium, Georgetown
Umpires: Chris Gaffaney (NZ) and Rod Tucker (Aus)
Player of the match: Axar Patel (Ind)

- England won the toss and elected to field.
- India qualified in the T20 World Cup final for the third time.

Throughout a rain-affected innings India managed to score 171 for the loss of 7 wickets, with the Indian captain Rohit Sharma scoring 57 off 39 balls and England's Chris Jordan taking 3/37 in 3 overs. In the second innings with the highest score being 25 off of 19 balls by Harry Brook, England were bowled out for 103 in 16.4 overs, with India's Kuldeep Yadav taking 3/19 in 4 overs. Indian spinner Axar Patel was awarded with the Player of the match award. India qualified for their third T20 World Cup final after previously having won the tournament in 2007 and being runner-up in 2014.

==== Final ====
29 June 2024
10:30 UTC−4
Scorecard

India; 176/7 (20 overs)	v	South Africa; 169/8 (20 overs)
Virat Kohli 76 (59); Keshav Maharaj 2/23 (3 overs)		Heinrich Klaasen 52 (27); Hardik Pandya 3/20 (3 overs)

India won by 7 runs
Kensington Oval, Bridgetown
Umpires: Chris Gaffaney (NZ) and Richard Illingworth (Eng)
Player of the match: Virat Kohli (Ind)

- India won the toss and elected to bat.
- This was South Africa's maiden appearance and India's third appearance at the T20 World Cup final.
- Hardik Pandya (Ind) played in his 100th T20I.
- Virat Kohli, Rohit Sharma and Ravindra Jadeja (Ind) all played their last T20I match.
- Rohit Sharma (Ind) became the first Indian player to win the T20 World Cup twice, and the first captain to win 50 T20I matches.
- Arshdeep Singh (Ind) equalled the record of Fazalhaq Farooqi for taking the most wickets in a single edition of a T20 World Cup (17).
- India scored the highest-ever total in the final of a T20 World Cup (176), surpassing the score of 172 set by New Zealand in 2021.
- India won their second T20 World Cup title, equalling the West Indies and England in most tournaments won. India also broke the record of the longest time between successive tournament wins (17 years), breaking the record of 12 years set by England.
- India also became the first team to win the T20 World Cup by winning 8 matches without losing.

=== World Test Championship ===
India was one of the nine nations that participated in the 2023–2025 World Test Championship, held from 16 June 2023 to 14 June 2025 at various locations. The International Cricket Council announced the 2023–2027 Future Tours Programme on 17 August 2022, which identified the series that were part of the World Test Championship. India finished third in the final standings and received a cash prize of US$1,440,000.

==== League Table ====
Pos.	Team	Matches				Ded.	Con.	Pts.	Pct.
Pos.	Team	P	W	L	D	Ded.	Con.	Pts.	Pct.
1	South Africa	12	8	3	1	0	144	100	69.44
2	Australia	19	13	4	2	10 (Note: Australia were deducted a total 10 points for a slow over-rate in the fourth Test against England.)	228	154	67.54
3	India	19	9	8	2	2 (Note: India were deducted a total 2 points for a slow over-rate in the first Test against South Africa.)	228	114	50.00
4	New Zealand	14	7	7	0	3 (Note: New Zealand were deducted a total 3 points for a slow over-rate in the first Test against England.)	168	81	48.21
5	England	22	11	10	1	22 (Note: England were deducted a total 22 points for a slow over-rate in the first, second, fourth, and fifth Tests against Australia and the first Test against New Zealand.)	264	114	43.18
6	Sri Lanka	13	5	8	0	0	156	60	38.46
7	Bangladesh	12	4	8	0	3 (Note: Bangladesh were deducted a total 3 points for a slow over-rate in the first Test against Pakistan.)	144	45	31.25
8	West Indies	13	3	8	2	0	156	44	28.21
9	Pakistan	14	5	9	0	13 (Note: Pakistan were deducted a total 13 points for a slow over-rate in the first Test against Australia, the first Test against Bangladesh and the second Test against South Africa.)	168	47	27.98

- Sources: International Cricket Council, ESPNcricinfo

==== Freedom Trophy (South Africa v India) (Note: The 1st Test was not mentioned in this article as it was played in December 2023.) ====
The Indian cricket team toured South Africa from December 2023 to January 2024 to play three Twenty20 Internationals (T20Is), three One Day Internationals (ODIs) and two Test matches. The Test series, where the teams were competing for the Freedom Trophy, formed part of the 2023–2025 ICC World Test Championship. South Africa won the first Test by an innings and 32 runs. India went on to win the second Test by 7 wickets, and drew the Test series 1–1.

2nd Test
3–4 January 2024
Scorecard

South Africa	v	India
55 (23.2 overs); Kyle Verreynne 15 (30); Mohammed Siraj 6/15 (9 overs)		153 (34.5 overs); Virat Kohli 46 (59); Lungi Ngidi 3/30 (6 overs)
176 (36.5 overs); Aiden Markram 106 (103); Jasprit Bumrah 6/61 (13.5 overs)		80/3 (12 overs); Yashasvi Jaiswal 28 (23); Marco Jansen 1/15 (2 overs)

India won by 7 wickets
Newlands Cricket Ground, Cape Town
Umpires: Ahsan Raza (Pak) and Langton Rusere (Zim)
Player of the match: Mohammed Siraj (Ind)

- South Africa won the toss and elected to bat.
- Tristan Stubbs (SA) made his Test debut. He became the first player since Harry Butt in 1896 to be dismissed twice on the first day of his Test debut.
- Dean Elgar (SA) played in his last Test. He became the first player since Jack Barrett in 1890 to be dismissed twice on the same day in his final Test match.
- South Africa's first innings total of 55 was the fewest runs India have conceded in a completed innings of a Test match.
- Shubman Gill (Ind) scored his 1,000th run in Tests.
- This was the shortest Test in terms of balls bowled to end in a result (642).
- This was India's first ever Test win at the venue.
- World Test Championship points: India 12, South Africa 0

==== Anthony de Mello Trophy (India v England) ====
The England cricket team toured India from January to March 2024 to play five Test matches.

25–28 January 2024
Scorecard

England	v	India
246 (64.3 overs); Ben Stokes 70 (88); Ravichandran Ashwin 3/68 (21 overs)		436 (121 overs); Ravindra Jadeja 87 (180); Joe Root 4/79 (29 overs)
420 (102.1 overs); Ollie Pope 196 (278); Jasprit Bumrah 4/41 (16.1 overs)		202 (69.2 overs); Rohit Sharma 39 (58); Tom Hartley 7/62 (26.2 overs)

England won by 28 runs
Rajiv Gandhi International Cricket Stadium, Hyderabad
Umpires: Chris Gaffaney (NZ) and Paul Reiffel (Aus)
Player of the match: Ollie Pope (Eng)

- England won the toss and elected to bat.
- KL Rahul (Ind) played in his 50th Test.
- Tom Hartley (Eng) made his Test debut and took his first five-wicket haul in Tests.
- This was India's first Test defeat at this venue.
- World Test Championship points: England 12, India 0.

2–5 February 2024
Scorecard

India	v	England
396 (112 overs); Yashasvi Jaiswal 209 (290); James Anderson 3/47 (25 overs)		253 (55.5 overs); Zak Crawley 76 (78); Jasprit Bumrah 6/45 (15.5 overs)
255 (78.3 overs); Shubman Gill 104 (147); Tom Hartley 4/77 (27 overs)		292 (69.2 overs); Zak Crawley 73 (132); Jasprit Bumrah 3/46 (17.2 overs)

India won by 106 runs
Dr. Y. S. Rajashekar Reddy ACA–VDCA Cricket Stadium, Visakhapatnam
Umpires: Marais Erasmus (SA) and Chris Gaffaney (NZ)
Player of the match: Jasprit Bumrah (Ind)

- India won the toss and elected to bat.
- Rajat Patidar (Ind) and Shoaib Bashir (Eng) both made their Test debuts.
- Yashasvi Jaiswal (Ind) scored his first double hundred in Tests.
- Jasprit Bumrah (Ind) took his 150th wicket in Tests.
- World Test Championship points: India 12, England 0.

15–18 February 2024
Scorecard

India	v	England
445 (130.5 overs); Rohit Sharma 131 (196); Mark Wood 4/114 (27.5 overs)		319 (71.1 overs); Ben Duckett 153 (151); Mohammed Siraj 4/84 (21.1 overs)
430/4d (98 overs); Yashasvi Jaiswal 214* (236); Tom Hartley 1/78 (23 overs)		122 (39.4 overs); Mark Wood 33 (15); Ravindra Jadeja 5/41 (12.4 overs)

India won by 434 runs
Niranjan Shah Stadium, Rajkot
Umpires: Kumar Dharmasena (SL) and Joel Wilson (WI)
Player of the match: Ravindra Jadeja (Ind)

- India won the toss and elected to bat.
- Dhruv Jurel and Sarfaraz Khan (Ind) both made their Test debuts.
- Ben Stokes (Eng) played in his 100th Test.
- Ravindra Jadeja (Ind) scored his 3,000th run in Tests.
- Ravichandran Ashwin surpassed Anil Kumble to become the fastest Indian bowler to pick up 500 wickets in Tests. He withdrew from the match after day two due to a family emergency, before rejoining at the start of the third session of play on day four.
- Yashasvi Jaiswal (Ind) equalled Wasim Akram's record for most sixes by a batter in a Test innings (12).
- This was India's largest win in Tests in terms of runs. It was also England's second largest defeat in Tests, and their largest since 1934.
- World Test Championship points: India 12, England 0.

23–26 February 2024
Scorecard

England	v	India
353 (104.5 overs); Joe Root 122* (274); Ravindra Jadeja 4/67 (32.5 overs)		307 (103.2 overs); Dhruv Jurel 90 (149); Shoaib Bashir 5/119 (44 overs)
145 (53.5 overs); Zak Crawley 60 (91); Ravichandran Ashwin 5/51 (15.5 overs)		192/5 (61 overs); Rohit Sharma 55 (81); Shoaib Bashir 3/79 (26 overs)

India won by 5 wickets
JSCA International Stadium Complex, Ranchi
Umpires: Kumar Dharmasena (SL) and Rod Tucker (Aus)
Player of the match: Dhruv Jurel (Ind)

- England won the toss and elected to bat.
- Akash Deep (Ind) made his Test debut.
- Shoaib Bashir (Eng) took his maiden five-wicket haul in Tests.
- Ravichandran Ashwin equalled Anil Kumble's record for the most five-wicket hauls by an Indian bowler in Tests (35).
- Rohit Sharma (Ind) scored his 4,000th run in Tests.
- World Test Championship points: India 12, England 0.

7–9 March 2024
Scorecard

England	v	India
218 (57.4 overs); Zak Crawley 79 (108); Kuldeep Yadav 5/72 (15 overs)		477 (124.1 overs); Shubman Gill 110 (150); Shoaib Bashir 5/173 (46.1 overs)
195 (48.1 overs); Joe Root 84 (128); Ravichandran Ashwin 5/77 (14 overs)

India won by an innings and 64 runs
Himachal Pradesh Cricket Association Stadium, Dharamshala
Umpires: Rod Tucker (Aus) and Joel Wilson (WI)
Player of the match: Kuldeep Yadav (Ind)

- England won the toss and elected to bat.
- Devdutt Padikkal (Ind) made his Test debut.
- Ravichandran Ashwin (Ind) and Jonny Bairstow (Eng) both played in their 100th Test.
- Kuldeep Yadav (Ind) took his 50th wicket in Tests.
- Jonny Bairstow (Eng) scored his 6,000th run in Tests.
- Yashasvi Jaiswal (Ind) broke Cheteshwar Pujara's record for the fastest to make 1,000 Test runs, in terms of matches played (9).
- James Anderson (Eng) became the first pacer and third bowler overall to pick 700 wickets in Tests.
- Ravichandran Ashwin claimed his 36th five-wicket haul, the most by an India bowler in Tests. He became the first player in Test cricket history to take a five-wicket haul in his hundredth test.
- This was the first time that a Test series had more than 100 sixes hit.
- India won a five match test series 4-1 after losing the first match, the first such instance in 112 years.
- World Test Championship points: India 12, England 0.

==== Ganguly–Durjoy Trophy (India v Bangladesh) ====
The Bangladesh cricket team toured India in September and October 2024 to play against the India cricket team.

19–22 September 2024
Scorecard

India	v	Bangladesh
376 (91.2 overs); Ravichandran Ashwin 113 (133); Hasan Mahmud 5/83 (22.2 overs)		149 (47.1 overs); Shakib Al Hasan 32 (64); Jasprit Bumrah 4/50 (11 overs)
287/4d (64 overs); Shubman Gill 119* (176); Mehidy Hasan Miraz 2/103 (25 overs)		234 (62.1 overs); Najmul Hossain Shanto 82 (127); Ravichandran Ashwin 6/88 (21 overs)

India won by 280 runs
M. A. Chidambaram Stadium, Chennai
Umpires: Richard Kettleborough (Eng) and Rod Tucker (Aus)
Player of the match: Ravichandran Ashwin (Ind)

- Bangladesh won the toss and elected to field.
- The 17 wickets to fall on day 2 were the most on a single day in a Test match at this ground.
- In Bangladesh's second innings, Ravichandran Ashwin passed Courtney Walsh on the list of bowlers with the most wickets in Tests.
- World Test Championship points: India 12, Bangladesh 0.

27 September – 1 October 2024
Scorecard

Bangladesh	v	India
233 (74.2 overs); Mominul Haque 107* (194); Jasprit Bumrah 3/50 (18 overs)		285/9d (34.4 overs); Yashasvi Jaiswal 72 (51); Mehidy Hasan Miraz 4/41 (6.4 overs)
146 (47 overs); Shadman Islam 50 (101); Jasprit Bumrah 3/17 (10 overs)		98/3 (17.2 overs); Yashasvi Jaiswal 51 (45); Mehidy Hasan Miraz 2/44 (9 overs)

India won by 7 wickets
Green Park Stadium, Kanpur
Umpires: Chris Brown (NZ) and Richard Kettleborough (Eng)
Player of the match: Yashasvi Jaiswal (Ind)

- India won the toss and elected to field.
- Only 35 overs of play was possible on Day 1 and no play was possible on Day 2 and Day 3 due to rain and wet outfield.
- Ravindra Jadeja (Ind) became the 39th person to take 300 Tests wickets, from fewer deliveries (11,817) than any player before him.
- Virat Kohli (Ind) became the fastest to complete 27,000 runs in international cricket, in terms of innings (594).
- India's match run rate of 7.36 was the highest in Test history, breaking the previous record of 6.80 set by South Africa in the first Test against Zimbabwe at Cape Town in 2005.
- World Test Championship points: India 12, Bangladesh 0.

==== India v New Zealand ====
The New Zealand cricket team toured India in October and November 2024 to play three Test matches against India cricket team. Prior to the series, New Zealand had won only two test matches in India with their last win coming in the 1988-89 season. New Zealand won all the three tests in the series, setting several records in the process, including their first series victory in India and the first instance of India being whitewashed 3–0 in a Test series at home. This was India's first Test series defeat at home since England beat them in 2012.

16–20 October 2024
Scorecard

India	v	New Zealand
46 (31.2 overs); Rishabh Pant 20 (49); Matt Henry 5/15 (13.2 overs)		402 (91.3 overs); Rachin Ravindra 134 (157); Ravindra Jadeja 3/72 (20 overs)
462 (99.3 overs); Sarfaraz Khan 150 (195); William O'Rourke 3/92 (21 overs)		110/2 (27.4 overs); Will Young 48* (76); Jasprit Bumrah 2/29 (8 overs)

New Zealand won by 8 wickets
M. Chinnaswamy Stadium, Bengaluru
Umpires: Michael Gough (Eng) and Paul Reiffel (Aus)
Player of the match: Rachin Ravindra (NZ)

- India won the toss and elected to bat.
- No play was possible on Day 1 due to rain.
- India recorded their third-lowest Test score, which was their lowest at home.
- Matt Henry became the joint second-fastest player to take 100 wickets in Tests for New Zealand.
- Virat Kohli (Ind) scored his 9,000th run in Tests.
- Sarfaraz Khan (Ind) scored his first century in Tests.
- This was New Zealand's first Test win against India in India after 36 years.
- World Test Championship points: New Zealand 12, India 0.

24–26 October 2024
Scorecard

New Zealand	v	India
259 (79.1 overs); Devon Conway 76 (141); Washington Sundar 7/59 (23.1 overs)		156 (45.3 overs); Ravindra Jadeja 38 (46); Mitchell Santner 7/53 (19.3 overs)
255 (69.4 overs); Tom Latham 86 (133); Washington Sundar 4/56 (19 overs)		245 (60.2 overs); Yashasvi Jaiswal 77 (65); Mitchell Santner 6/104 (29 overs)

New Zealand won by 113 runs
Maharashtra Cricket Association Stadium, Pune
Umpires: Richard Illingworth (Eng) and Paul Reiffel (Aus)
Player of the match: Mitchell Santner (NZ)

- New Zealand won the toss and elected to bat.
- Both Washington Sundar (Ind) and Mitchell Santner (NZ) took their first five-wicket haul and first ten-wicket haul in Tests.
- This was India's first Test series defeat at home since 2012.
- This was New Zealand's first Test series victory in India.
- World Test Championship points: New Zealand 12, India 0.

1–3 November 2024
Scorecard

New Zealand	v	India
235 (65.4 overs); Daryl Mitchell 82 (129); Ravindra Jadeja 5/65 (22 overs)		263 (59.4 overs); Shubman Gill 90 (146); Ajaz Patel 5/103 (21.4 overs)
174 (45.5 overs); Will Young 51 (100); Ravindra Jadeja 5/55 (13.5 overs)		121 (29.1 overs); Rishabh Pant 64 (57); Ajaz Patel 6/57 (14.1 overs)

New Zealand won by 25 runs
Wankhede Stadium, Mumbai
Umpires: Michael Gough (Eng) and Richard Illingworth (Eng)
Player of the match: Ajaz Patel (NZ)

- New Zealand won the toss and elected to bat.
- This was the first time India was whitewashed 3-0 in a Test series at home.
- World Test Championship points: New Zealand 12, India 0.

==== Border–Gavaskar Trophy (Australia v India) (Note: The 5th test was not mentioned in this article as it was played in January 2025.) ====
The Indian cricket team toured Australia from November 2024 to January 2025 to play five Test matches and three first-class warm-up matches against the Australian cricket team. India had retained the Border–Gavaskar Trophy after defeating Australia 2–1 in the previous series in 2023. However, this time Australia won the series by 3–1 to win the trophy for the first time since 2014-15. This was also the last Test series of Ravichandran Ashwin, Rohit Sharma and Virat Kohli before their Test retirements.

22–25 November 2024
Scorecard

India	v	Australia
150 (49.4 overs); Nitish Kumar Reddy 41 (59); Josh Hazlewood 4/29 (13 overs)		104 (51.2 overs); Mitchell Starc 29 (112); Jasprit Bumrah 5/30 (18 overs)
6/487d (134.3 overs); Yashasvi Jaiswal 161 (297); Nathan Lyon 2/96 (39 overs)		238 (58.4 overs); Travis Head 89 (101); Jasprit Bumrah 3/42 (12 overs)

India won by 295 runs
Perth Stadium, Perth
Umpires: Chris Gaffaney (NZ) and Richard Kettleborough (Eng)
Player of the match: Jasprit Bumrah (Ind)

- India won the toss and elected to bat.
- Nathan McSweeney (Aus), Harshit Rana and Nitish Kumar Reddy (Ind) all made their Test debuts.
- KL Rahul (Ind) scored his 3,000th run in Tests.
- Virat Kohli scored his 7th Test century in Australia, breaking Sachin Tendulkar's record of most Test centuries for India in Australia.
- This was Australia's first loss in a Test match at the Perth Stadium and India became the first visiting team to win a Test match at the ground.
- This was India's biggest victory in terms of runs in Australia.
- World Test Championship points: India 12, Australia 0.

6–8 December 2024 (D/N)
Scorecard

India	v	Australia
180 (44.1 overs); Nitish Kumar Reddy 42 (54); Mitchell Starc 6/48 (14.1 overs)		337 (87.3 overs); Travis Head 140 (141); Jasprit Bumrah 4/61 (23 overs)
175 (36.5 overs); Nitish Kumar Reddy 42 (47); Pat Cummins 5/57 (14 overs)		0/19 (3.2 overs); Nathan McSweeney 10* (12)

Australia won by 10 wickets
Adelaide Oval, Adelaide
Umpires: Chris Gaffaney (NZ) and Richard Illingworth (Eng)
Player of the match: Travis Head (Aus)

- India won the toss and elected to bat.
- Travis Head (Aus) scored a century off 111 balls, the fastest in day-night Tests.
- Ravichandran Ashwin (Ind) played in his last Test match.
- World Test Championship points: Australia 12, India 0.

14–18 December 2024
Scorecard

Australia	v	India
445 (117.1 overs); Travis Head 152 (160); Jasprit Bumrah 6/76 (28 overs)		260 (78.5 overs); KL Rahul 84 (139); Pat Cummins 4/81 (22 overs)
7/89d (18 overs); Pat Cummins 22 (10); Jasprit Bumrah 3/18 (6 overs)		0/8 (2.1 overs); Yashasvi Jaiswal 4* (6)

Match drawn
The Gabba, Brisbane
Umpires: Richard Illingworth (Eng) and Richard Kettleborough (Eng)
Player of the match: Travis Head (Aus)

- India won the toss and elected to field.
- Only 13.2 overs of play was possible on Day 1 and 24.1 overs of play on Day 5 was possible due to rain.
- Virat Kohli (Ind) played in his 100th international match against Australia.
- Jasprit Bumrah took his 52nd Test wicket in Australia, breaking Kapil Dev's record of most Test wickets taken for India in Australia.
- World Test Championship points: Australia 4, India 4.

26–30 December 2024
Scorecard

Australia	v	India
474 (122.4 overs); Steve Smith 140 (197); Jasprit Bumrah 4/99 (28.4 overs)		369 (119.3 overs); Nitish Kumar Reddy 114 (189); Scott Boland 3/57 (27 overs)
234 (83.4 overs); Marnus Labuschagne 70 (139); Jasprit Bumrah 5/57 (24.4 overs)		155 (79.1 overs); Yashasvi Jaiswal 84 (208); Pat Cummins 3/28 (18 overs)

Australia won by 184 runs
Melbourne Cricket Ground, Melbourne
Umpires: Michael Gough (Eng) and Joel Wilson (WI)
Player of the match: Pat Cummins (Aus)

- Australia won the toss and elected to bat.
- Sam Konstas (Aus) made his Test debut. His fifty off 52 deliveries was the third fastest by an Australian on debut.
- Nitish Kumar Reddy (Ind) scored his maiden century in Tests. He made the highest score for a batsman batting at 8 or lower at the MCG.
- Jasprit Bumrah (Ind) took his 200th wicket in Tests.
- The all-time attendance record for a Test match in Australia was broken (1st day 87,242, 2nd day 85,147, 3rd day 83,073, 4th day 43,867 and 5th day 74,362).
- Rohit Sharma (Ind) played in his last Test match.
- World Test Championship points: Australia 12, India 0.

=== Indian Premier League ===
The 2024 Indian Premier League was the 17th edition of the Indian Premier League held from 22 March to 26 May 2024. The tournament featured 10 teams competing in 74 matches across 13 venues in India. In the final, Kolkata Knight Riders defeated Sunrisers Hyderabad by 8 wickets to win their third IPL title.

==== League Stage ====
Pos	Grp	Team	Pld	W	L	NR	Pts	NRR	Qualification
1	A	Kolkata Knight Riders (C)	14	9	3	2	20	1.428	Advanced to Qualifier 1
2	B	Sunrisers Hyderabad (R)	14	8	5	1	17	0.414	Advanced to Qualifier 1
3	A	Rajasthan Royals (3rd)	14	8	5	1	17	0.273	Advanced to Eliminator
4	B	Royal Challengers Bengaluru (4th)	14	7	7	0	14	0.459	Advanced to Eliminator
5	B	Chennai Super Kings	14	7	7	0	14	0.392	Eliminated
6	A	Delhi Capitals	14	7	7	0	14	−0.377	Eliminated
7	A	Lucknow Super Giants	14	7	7	0	14	−0.667	Eliminated
8	B	Gujarat Titans	14	5	7	2	12	−1.063	Eliminated
9	B	Punjab Kings	14	5	9	0	10	−0.353	Eliminated
10	A	Mumbai Indians	14	4	10	0	8	−0.318	Eliminated

Source: ESPNcricinfo
(C) Champions; (R) Runners-up

Team	Group matches														Playoffs			
Team	1	2	3	4	5	6	7	8	9	10	11	12	13	14	Q1	E	Q2	F
Chennai Super Kings	2	4	4	4	6	8	8	8	10	10	12	12	14	14				
Delhi Capitals	0	0	2	2	2	4	6	6	8	10	10	12	12	14				
Gujarat Titans	2	2	4	4	4	6	6	8	8	8	8	10	11	12				
Kolkata Knight Riders	2	4	6	6	8	8	10	10	12	14	16	18	19	20	W			W
Lucknow Super Giants	0	2	4	6	6	6	8	10	10	12	12	12	12	14				
Mumbai Indians	0	0	0	2	4	4	6	6	6	6	6	8	8	8				
Punjab Kings	2	2	2	4	4	4	4	4	6	8	8	8	10	10				
Rajasthan Royals	2	4	6	8	8	10	12	14	16	16	16	16	16	17		W	L	
Royal Challengers Bengaluru	0	2	2	2	2	2	2	2	4	6	8	10	12	14		L		
Sunrisers Hyderabad	0	2	2	4	6	8	10	10	10	12	12	14	15	17	L		W	L

Win	Loss	No result

- Note: The total points at the end of each group match are listed.
- Note: Click on the points (group matches) or W/L (playoffs) to see the match summary.

Visitor team →	CSK	DC	GT	KKR	LSG	MI	PBKS	RR	RCB	SRH
Home team ↓	CSK	DC	GT	KKR	LSG	MI	PBKS	RR	RCB	SRH
Chennai Super Kings			Chennai; 63 runs	Chennai; 7 wickets	Lucknow; 6 wickets		Punjab; 7 wickets	Chennai; 5 wickets	Chennai; 6 wickets	Chennai; 78 runs
Delhi Capitals	Delhi; 20 runs		Delhi; 4 runs	Kolkata; 106 runs	Delhi; 19 runs	Delhi; 10 runs		Delhi; 20 runs		Hyderabad; 67 runs
Gujarat Titans	Gujarat; 35 runs	Delhi; 6 wickets		Match abandoned		Gujarat; 6 runs	Punjab; 3 wickets		Bengaluru; 9 wickets	Gujarat; 7 wickets
Kolkata Knight Riders		Kolkata; 7 wickets			Kolkata; 8 wickets	Kolkata; 18 runs	Punjab; 8 wickets	Rajasthan; 2 wickets	Kolkata; 1 run	Kolkata; 4 runs
Lucknow Super Giants	Lucknow; 8 wickets	Delhi; 6 wickets	Lucknow; 33 runs	Kolkata; 98 runs		Lucknow; 4 wickets	Lucknow; 21 runs	Rajasthan; 7 wickets		
Mumbai Indians	Chennai; 20 runs	Mumbai; 29 runs		Kolkata; 24 runs	Lucknow; 18 runs			Rajasthan; 6 wickets	Mumbai; 7 wickets	Mumbai; 7 wickets
Punjab Kings	Chennai; 28 runs	Punjab; 4 wickets	Gujarat; 3 wickets			Mumbai; 9 runs		Rajasthan; 3 wickets	Bengaluru; 60 runs	Hyderabad; 2 runs
Rajasthan Royals		Rajasthan; 12 runs	Gujarat; 3 wickets	Match abandoned	Rajasthan; 20 runs	Rajasthan; 9 wickets	Punjab; 5 wickets		Rajasthan; 6 wickets	
Royal Challengers Bengaluru	Bengaluru; 27 runs	Bengaluru; 47 runs	Bengaluru; 4 wickets	Kolkata; 7 wickets	Lucknow; 28 runs		Bengaluru; 4 wickets			Hyderabad; 25 runs
Sunrisers Hyderabad	Hyderabad; 6 wickets		Match abandoned		Hyderabad; 10 wickets	Hyderabad; 31 runs	Hyderabad; 4 wickets	Hyderabad; 1 run	Bengaluru; 35 runs	

Home team won	Visitor team won

- Note: Results listed are according to the home (horizontal) and visitor (vertical) teams.
- Note: Click on a result to see a summary of the match.

==== Playoffs ====
Qualifier 1
21 May 2024 – Ahmedabad
1	Kolkata Knight Riders	164/2 (13.4 overs)
2	Sunrisers Hyderabad	159 (19.3 overs)
Eliminator
22 May 2024 – Ahmedabad
3	Rajasthan Royals	174/6 (19 overs)
4	Royal Challengers Bengaluru	172/8 (20 overs)

Qualifier 2
24 May 2024 – Chennai
Q1L	Sunrisers Hyderabad	175/9 (20 overs)
EW	Rajasthan Royals	139/7 (20 overs)

Final
26 May 2024 – Chennai
Q1W	Kolkata Knight Riders	114/2 (10.3 overs)
Q2W	Sunrisers Hyderabad	113 (18.3 overs)

Qualifier 1
21 May 2024
19:30 (N)
Scorecard

Sunrisers Hyderabad; 159 (19.3 overs)	v	Kolkata Knight Riders; 164/2 (13.4 overs)
Rahul Tripathi 55 (35); Mitchell Starc 3/34 (4 overs)		Shreyas Iyer 58* (24); T Natarajan 1/22 (3 overs)

Kolkata Knight Riders won by 8 wickets
Narendra Modi Stadium, Ahmedabad
Umpires: Anil Chaudhary (Ind) and Rohan Pandit (Ind)
Player of the match: Mitchell Starc (Kolkata Knight Riders)

- Sunrisers Hyderabad won the toss and elected to bat.
- Kolkata Knight Riders qualified for the final for the 4th time in IPL history.

Eliminator
22 May 2024
19:30 (N)
Scorecard

Royal Challengers Bengaluru; 172/8 (20 overs)	v	Rajasthan Royals; 174/6 (19 overs)
Rajat Patidar 34 (22); Avesh Khan 3/44 (4 overs)		Yashasvi Jaiswal 45 (30); Mohammed Siraj 2/33 (4 overs)

Rajasthan Royals won by 4 wickets
Narendra Modi Stadium, Ahmedabad
Umpires: K. N. Ananthapadmanabhan (Ind) and Saidharshan Kumar (Ind)
Player of the match: Ravichandran Ashwin (Rajasthan Royals)

- Rajasthan Royals won the toss and elected to field.
- Virat Kohli (Royal Challengers Bengaluru) scored his 8,000th run in the IPL.

Qualifier 2
24 May 2024
19:30 (N)
Scorecard

Sunrisers Hyderabad; 175/9 (20 overs)	v	Rajasthan Royals; 139/7 (20 overs)
Heinrich Klaasen 50 (34); Avesh Khan 3/27 (4 overs)		Dhruv Jurel 56* (35); Shahbaz Ahmed 3/23 (4 overs)

Sunrisers Hyderabad won by 36 runs
M. A. Chidambaram Stadium, Chennai
Umpires: Nitin Menon (Ind) and Virender Sharma (Ind)
Player of the match: Shahbaz Ahmed (Sunrisers Hyderabad)

- Rajasthan Royals won the toss and elected to field.
- Sunrisers Hyderabad qualified for the final for the 3rd time in IPL history.

==== Final ====
After winning the toss, Sunrisers Hyderabad elected to bat but only managed to score 113 runs in 18.3 overs. The Kolkata Knight Riders easily chased the target in 10.3 overs and won the match by eight wickets, thus winning their third IPL title. KKR player Mitchell Starc was named as the player of the match for taking 2 wickets and 2 catches. Sunil Narine (KKR) was named as the player of the season for scoring 488 runs and taking 17 wickets throughout the tournament.

Final
26 May 2024
19:30 (N)
Scorecard

Sunrisers Hyderabad; 113 (18.3 overs)	v	Kolkata Knight Riders; 114/2 (10.3 overs)
Pat Cummins 24 (19); Andre Russell 3/19 (2.3 overs)		Venkatesh Iyer 52* (26); Pat Cummins 1/18 (2 overs)

Kolkata Knight Riders won by 8 wickets
M. A. Chidambaram Stadium, Chennai
Umpires: Jayaraman Madanagopal (Ind) and Nitin Menon (Ind)
Player of the match: Mitchell Starc (Kolkata Knight Riders)

- Sunrisers Hyderabad won the toss and elected to bat.
- Shreyas Iyer (Kolkata Knight Riders) became the first captain to lead two different teams to an IPL final, he previously led Delhi Capitals to the final in 2020.
- Sunrisers Hyderabad scored the lowest total in an IPL final.
- Mitchell Starc (Kolkata Knight Riders) took his 50th wicket in the IPL.
- Kolkata Knight Riders won their third title. They became the first team to win the IPL under different captains (2012 and 2014 under Gautam Gambhir and 2024 under Shreyas Iyer). They also set the record for the fastest IPL final chase with 57 balls remaining, equalling the record for the fewest losses in a single tournament.
- Pat Cummins (Sunrisers Hyderabad) set the record for the most runs conceded by a bowler in a season (566), surpassing Tushar Deshpande's record of 564 set in the 2023 IPL.
- This was the shortest-ever final in the IPL history.
