= New Zealand cricket team in India in 2024–25 =

International cricket tour

	India	New Zealand
- Dates: 16 October – 5 November 2024
Captains	Rohit Sharma	Tom Latham

Test series
- Result: New Zealand won the 3-match series 3–0
Most runs	Rishabh Pant (261)	Rachin Ravindra (256)
Most wickets	Ravindra Jadeja (16); Washington Sundar (16)	Ajaz Patel (15)
- Player of the series: Will Young (NZ)

The New Zealand cricket team toured India in October and November 2024 to play three Test matches against India cricket team. The Test series formed part of the 2023–2025 ICC World Test Championship. In June 2024, the Board of Control for Cricket in India (BCCI) confirmed the fixtures for the tour, as a part of the 2024–25 home international season.

Prior to the series, New Zealand had won only two test matches in India with their last win coming in the 1988-89 season. New Zealand won all the three tests in the series, setting several records in the process, including their first series victory in India and the first instance of India being whitewashed 3-0 in a Test series at home. New Zealand for the first time won 3 Test matches in same series This was India's first Test series defeat at home since England beat them in 2012.

== Squads ==
India	New Zealand
Rohit Sharma (c); Jasprit Bumrah (vc); Ravichandran Ashwin; Akash Deep; Shubman Gill; Ravindra Jadeja; Yashasvi Jaiswal; Dhruv Jurel (wk); Sarfaraz Khan; Virat Kohli; Rishabh Pant (wk); Axar Patel; KL Rahul; Harshit Rana (Note: In squad for third Test only.); Mohammed Siraj; Washington Sundar (Note: In squad for second and third Test only.); Kuldeep Yadav	Tom Latham (c); Tom Blundell (wk); Michael Bracewell (Note: In squad for first Test only.); Mark Chapman; Devon Conway; Jacob Duffy; Matt Henry; Daryl Mitchell; William O'Rourke; Ajaz Patel; Glenn Phillips; Rachin Ravindra; Mitchell Santner; ~~Ben Sears~~; Ish Sodhi; Tim Southee; ~~Kane Williamson~~; Will Young

India named Harshit Rana, Nitish Kumar Reddy, Mayank Yadav, and Prasidh Krishna as travelling reserves. On 20 October 2024, Washington Sundar was added to India’s squad for the second and third Tests. On 29 October, Harshit Rana was added to India’s squad for the third Test.

New Zealand named Michael Bracewell for only the first match, whereas Ish Sodhi was named for the second and third matches only. On 15 October 2024, Ben Sears was ruled out of the Test series due to knee injury, with Jacob Duffy named as his replacement. On 22 October, Kane Williamson was ruled out of the second Test due to his rehabilitation from a groin strain. He missed the first Test for the same reason. On 29 October, Williamson was ruled out of the third Test.

== Test series ==
=== 1st Test ===
16–20 October 2024
Scorecard

India	v	New Zealand
46 (31.2 overs); Rishabh Pant 20 (49); Matt Henry 5/15 (13.2 overs)		402 (91.3 overs); Rachin Ravindra 134 (157); Ravindra Jadeja 3/72 (20 overs)
462 (99.3 overs); Sarfaraz Khan 150 (195); William O'Rourke 3/92 (21 overs)		110/2 (27.4 overs); Will Young 48* (76); Jasprit Bumrah 2/29 (8 overs)

New Zealand won by 8 wickets
M. Chinnaswamy Stadium, Bengaluru
Umpires: Michael Gough (Eng) and Paul Reiffel (Aus)
Player of the match: Rachin Ravindra (NZ)

- India won the toss and elected to bat.
- No play was possible on Day 1 due to rain.
- India recorded their third-lowest Test score, which was their lowest at home.
- Matt Henry became the joint second-fastest player to take 100 wickets in Tests for New Zealand.
- Virat Kohli (Ind) scored his 9,000th run in Tests.
- Sarfaraz Khan (Ind) scored his first century in Tests.
- This was New Zealand's first Test win against India in India after 36 years.
- World Test Championship points: New Zealand 12, India 0.

=== 2nd Test ===
24–26 October 2024
Scorecard

New Zealand	v	India
259 (79.1 overs); Devon Conway 76 (141); Washington Sundar 7/59 (23.1 overs)		156 (45.3 overs); Ravindra Jadeja 38 (46); Mitchell Santner 7/53 (19.3 overs)
255 (69.4 overs); Tom Latham 86 (133); Washington Sundar 4/56 (19 overs)		245 (60.2 overs); Yashasvi Jaiswal 77 (65); Mitchell Santner 6/104 (29 overs)

New Zealand won by 113 runs
Maharashtra Cricket Association Stadium, Pune
Umpires: Richard Illingworth (Eng) and Paul Reiffel (Aus)
Player of the match: Mitchell Santner (NZ)

- New Zealand won the toss and elected to bat.
- Both Washington Sundar (Ind) and Mitchell Santner (NZ) took their first five-wicket haul and first ten-wicket haul in Tests.
- This was India's first Test series defeat at home since 2012.
- This was New Zealand's first Test series victory in India.
- World Test Championship points: New Zealand 12, India 0.

=== 3rd Test ===
1–3 November 2024
Scorecard

New Zealand	v	India
235 (65.4 overs); Daryl Mitchell 82 (129); Ravindra Jadeja 5/65 (22 overs)		263 (59.4 overs); Shubman Gill 90 (146); Ajaz Patel 5/103 (21.4 overs)
174 (45.5 overs); Will Young 51 (100); Ravindra Jadeja 5/55 (13.5 overs)		121 (29.1 overs); Rishabh Pant 64 (57); Ajaz Patel 6/57 (14.1 overs)

New Zealand won by 25 runs
Wankhede Stadium, Mumbai
Umpires: Michael Gough (Eng) and Richard Illingworth (Eng)
Player of the match: Ajaz Patel (NZ)

- New Zealand won the toss and elected to bat.
- This was the first time India was whitewashed 3-0 in a Test series at home.
- Ravichandran Ashwin, Virat Kohli and Rohit Sharma (Ind) played their last test on Indian soil.
- World Test Championship points: New Zealand 12, India 0.

== Statistics ==
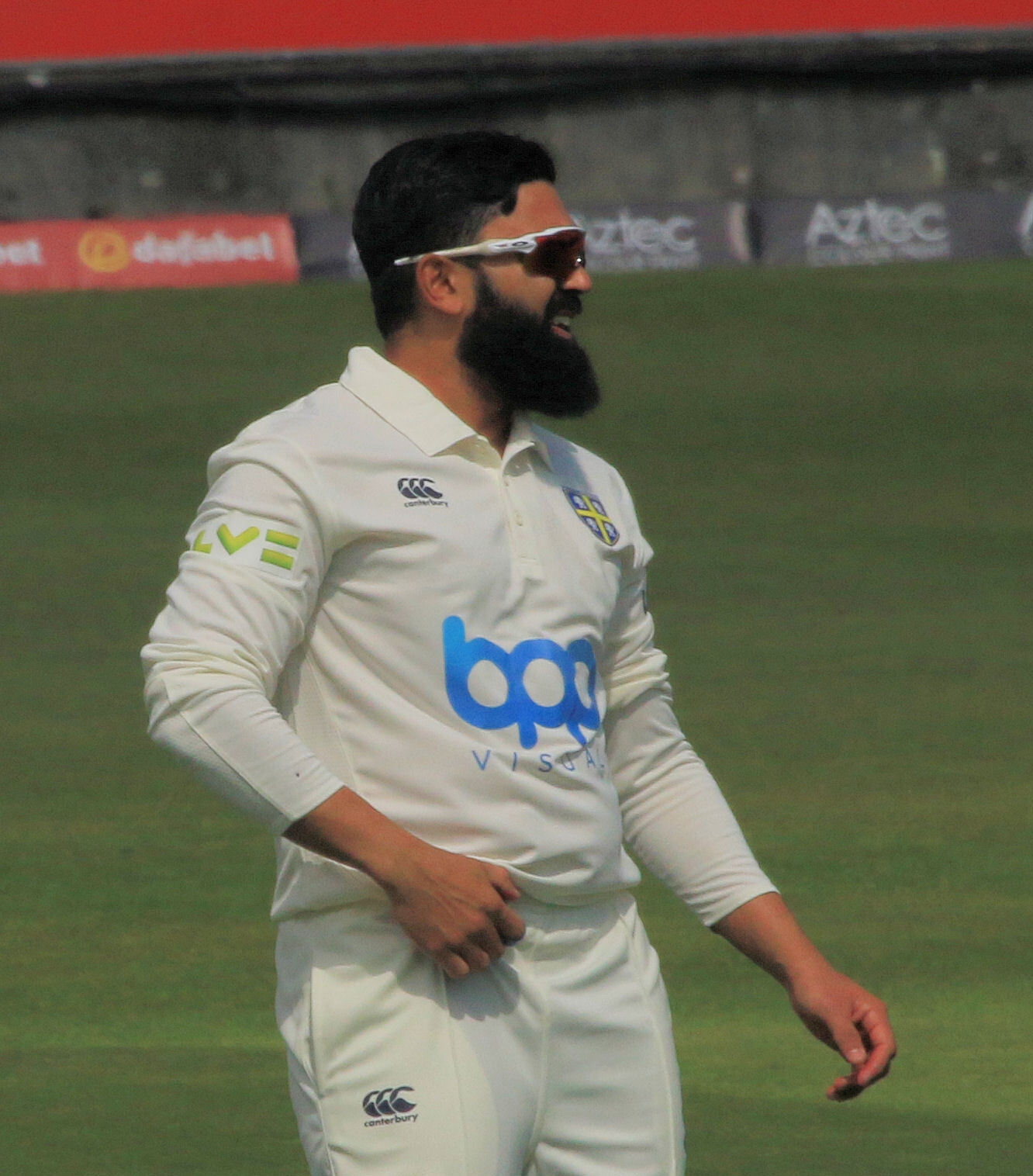
Ajaz Patel took the most wickets for the visiting team

=== Leading run-scorers ===
Rank	Name	Runs	Matches	Innings	HS	Average	100s	50s
1	(India) Rishabh Pant	261	3	6	99	43.50	-	3
2	(New Zealand) Rachin Ravindra	256	3	6	134	51.20	1	1
3	(New Zealand) Will Young	244	3	6	71	48.80	-	2
4	(New Zealand) Devon Conway	227	3	6	91	37.83	-	2
5	(India) Yashasvi Jaiswal	190	3	6	77	31.66	-	1
Source: ESPNcricinfo

=== Leading wicket-takers ===
Rank	Name	Wickets	Matches	Innings	Overs	Average	Best.
1	(India) Washington Sundar	16	2	4	70.5	14.12	7/59
2	(India) Ravindra Jadeja	16	3	6	101.1	21.56	5/55
3	(New Zealand) Ajaz Patel	15	3	5	77.1	23.80	6/57
4	(New Zealand) Mitchell Santner	13	1	2	48.3	12.07	7/53
5	(New Zealand) Matt Henry	10	2	4	48.5	15.30	5/15
Source: ESPNcricinfo
