= New Zealand cricket team in India in 2021–22 =

International cricket tour

	India	New Zealand
- Dates: 17 November – 7 December 2021
Captains	Virat Kohli (Note: Ajinkya Rahane captained India for the first Test match.) (Tests); Rohit Sharma (T20Is)	Kane Williamson (Note: Tom Latham captained New Zealand for the second Test match.) (Tests); Tim Southee (Note: Mitchell Santner captained New Zealand for the third T20I match.) (T20Is)

Test series
- Result: India won the 2-match series 1–0
Most runs	Mayank Agarwal (242)	Tom Latham (163)
Most wickets	Ravichandran Ashwin (14)	Ajaz Patel (17)
- Player of the series: Ravichandran Ashwin (Ind)

Twenty20 International series
- Results: India won the 3-match series 3–0
Most runs	Rohit Sharma (159)	Martin Guptill (152)
Most wickets	Harshal Patel (4); Axar Patel (4)	Tim Southee (4); Mitchell Santner (4)
- Player of the series: Rohit Sharma (Ind)

The New Zealand cricket team toured India in November and December 2021 to play two Test and three Twenty20 International (T20I) matches. The Test matches formed part of the 2021–2023 ICC World Test Championship. In September 2021, the Board of Control for Cricket in India (BCCI) confirmed the schedule for the tour.

Prior to the 2021 ICC Men's T20 World Cup, Virat Kohli announced that he would be stepping down as the captain of India's T20I team following the conclusion of the tournament. In November 2021, the BCCI named Rohit Sharma as India's T20I captain for the matches against New Zealand. Ajinkya Rahane was named as India's captain for the first Test, with Virat Kohli joining the team to captain the side for the second Test. Before the start of the T20I series, New Zealand Cricket announced that Kane Williamson would miss the T20I matches to focus on his preparation for the Test matches, with Tim Southee named as captain in his absence. Williamson also missed the second Test, due to an injury, with Tom Latham named as New Zealand's captain for the match.

India won the first T20I match by five wickets, and won the second match by seven wickets to win the series with a match to spare. India won the third T20I match by 73 runs to win the series 3–0. The first Test match was drawn, with India needing one wicket for victory before bad light stopped play late on the fifth and final day. With the draw, it extended New Zealand's undefeated record in Test cricket to ten consecutive matches, their longest streak in the format. In the second Test, New Zealand's Ajaz Patel became the third bowler to take all ten wickets in an innings in Test cricket, bowling India out for 325 runs. However, in reply New Zealand were bowled out for only 62 runs. India went on to win the match by 372 runs, winning the Test series 1–0.

== Squads ==
Tests		T20Is	
India	New Zealand	India	New Zealand
Virat Kohli (c); Ajinkya Rahane (c); Cheteshwar Pujara (vc); Mayank Agarwal; Ravichandran Ashwin; K. S. Bharat (wk); Shubman Gill; Shreyas Iyer; Ravindra Jadeja; Prasidh Krishna; Axar Patel; ~~KL Rahul~~; Wriddhiman Saha (wk); Ishant Sharma; Mohammed Siraj; Jayant Yadav; Suryakumar Yadav; Umesh Yadav	Kane Williamson (c); Tom Latham (vc); Tom Blundell (wk); ~~Devon Conway~~; Kyle Jamieson; Daryl Mitchell; Henry Nicholls; Ajaz Patel; Glenn Phillips; Rachin Ravindra; Mitchell Santner; Will Somerville; Tim Southee; Ross Taylor; Will Young; Neil Wagner	Rohit Sharma (c); KL Rahul (vc); Ravichandran Ashwin; Yuzvendra Chahal; Deepak Chahar; Ruturaj Gaikwad; Shreyas Iyer; Venkatesh Iyer; Avesh Khan; Ishan Kishan (wk); Bhuvneshwar Kumar; Rishabh Pant (wk); Axar Patel; Harshal Patel; Mohammed Siraj; Suryakumar Yadav	Tim Southee (c); ~~Kane Williamson (c)~~; Mitchell Santner (vc); Todd Astle; Trent Boult; Mark Chapman; ~~Devon Conway~~; Lockie Ferguson; Martin Guptill; ~~Kyle Jamieson~~; Adam Milne; Daryl Mitchell; James Neesham; Glenn Phillips; Rachin Ravindra; Tim Seifert (wk); Ish Sodhi

Adam Milne was named as injury cover for New Zealand's T20I squad. Trent Boult and Colin de Grandhomme both opted out of New Zealand's Test squad, citing bubble fatigue. Devon Conway was ruled out of New Zealand's T20I and Test squads after breaking his hand during the semi-final match against England at the 2021 ICC Men's T20 World Cup. Daryl Mitchell was named as Conway's replacement in New Zealand's Test side. Kyle Jamieson opted out of New Zealand's T20I squad to focus on the Test matches. Following the T20I series, Suryakumar Yadav was added to India's Test squad, replacing KL Rahul, who was ruled out of the Test matches due to a muscle strain injury.

== T20I series ==
=== 1st T20I ===
17 November 2021
19:00 (N)
Scorecard

New Zealand; 164/6 (20 overs)	v	India; 166/5 (19.4 overs)
Martin Guptill 70 (42); Ravichandran Ashwin 2/23 (4 overs)		Suryakumar Yadav 62 (40); Trent Boult 2/31 (4 overs)

India won by 5 wickets
Sawai Mansingh Stadium, Jaipur
Umpires: K. N. Ananthapadmanabhan (Ind) and Virender Sharma (Ind)
Player of the match: Suryakumar Yadav (Ind)

- India won the toss and elected to field.
- Venkatesh Iyer (Ind) made his T20I debut.
- This was the first T20I match to be played at this ground.

=== 2nd T20I ===
19 November 2021
19:00 (N)
Scorecard

New Zealand; 153/6 (20 overs)	v	India; 155/3 (17.2 overs)
Glenn Phillips 34 (21); Harshal Patel 2/25 (4 overs)		KL Rahul 65 (49); Tim Southee 3/16 (4 overs)

India won by 7 wickets
JSCA International Stadium Complex, Ranchi
Umpires: Anil Chaudhary (Ind) and Jayaraman Madanagopal (Ind)
Player of the match: Harshal Patel (Ind)

- India won the toss and elected to field.
- Harshal Patel (Ind) made his T20I debut.

=== 3rd T20I ===
21 November 2021
19:00 (N)
Scorecard

India; 184/7 (20 overs)	v	New Zealand; 111 (17.2 overs)
Rohit Sharma 56 (31); Mitchell Santner 3/27 (4 overs)		Martin Guptill 51 (36); Axar Patel 3/9 (3 overs)

India won by 73 runs
Eden Gardens, Kolkata
Umpires: K. N. Ananthapadmanabhan (Ind) and Virender Sharma (Ind)
Player of the match: Axar Patel (Ind)

- India won the toss and elected to bat.

== Test series ==
=== 1st Test ===
25–29 November 2021
Scorecard

India	v	New Zealand
345 (111.1 overs); Shreyas Iyer 105 (171); Tim Southee 5/69 (27.4 overs)		296 (142.3 overs); Tom Latham 95 (282); Axar Patel 5/62 (34 overs)
234/7d (81 overs); Shreyas Iyer 65 (125); Kyle Jamieson 3/40 (17 overs)		165/9 (98 overs); Tom Latham 52 (146); Ravindra Jadeja 4/40 (28 overs)

Match drawn
Green Park Stadium, Kanpur
Umpires: Nitin Menon (Ind) and Virender Sharma (Ind)
Player of the match: Shreyas Iyer (Ind)

- India won the toss and elected to bat.
- Shreyas Iyer (Ind) and Rachin Ravindra (NZ) both made their Test debuts.
- Shreyas Iyer (Ind) scored his maiden century in Tests.
- Kyle Jamieson (NZ) took his 50th wicket in Tests.
- World Test Championship points: India 4, New Zealand 4.

=== 2nd Test ===
3–7 December 2021 (Note: While five days of play were scheduled for each Test, the second Test reached a result in four days.)
Scorecard

India	v	New Zealand
325 (109.5 overs); Mayank Agarwal 150 (311); Ajaz Patel 10/119 (47.5 overs)		62 (28.1 overs); Kyle Jamieson 17 (36); Ravichandran Ashwin 4/8 (8 overs)
276/7d (70 overs); Mayank Agarwal 62 (108); Ajaz Patel 4/106 (26 overs)		167 (56.3 overs); Daryl Mitchell 60 (92); Ravichandran Ashwin 4/34 (22.3 overs)

India won by 372 runs
Wankhede Stadium, Mumbai
Umpires: Anil Chaudhary (Ind) and Nitin Menon (Ind)
Player of the match: Mayank Agarwal (Ind)

- India won the toss and elected to bat.
- No play was possible before lunch on day 1 due to rain.
- Ajaz Patel (NZ) became the third bowler to take ten wickets in an innings in Tests, after Jim Laker and Anil Kumble.
- This was India's biggest win in Tests in terms of runs.
- World Test Championship points: India 12, New Zealand 0.
