= 1990–91 Duleep Trophy =

- Dates: 11 January 1991 – 29 January 1991
- Administrator: BCCI
- Cricket format: First-class cricket
- Tournament format: Knockout
- Champions: North Zone (8th title)
- Participants: 5
- Matches: 4
- Most runs: Lalchand Rajput (WZ) (353)
- Most wickets: Avinash Kumar (EZ) (10)

The 1990–91 Duleep Trophy was the 30th season of the Duleep Trophy, a first-class cricket tournament contested by five zonal teams of India: Central Zone, East Zone, North Zone, South Zone and West Zone.

North Zone won the final against West Zone on first innings lead. However, the umpires called the match off when Rashid Patel attacked both Raman Lamba and Ajay Jadeja with a stump.

== Results ==
Quarterfinal
East Zone
West Zone	FIL

Semifinals
South Zone
West Zone	FIL
Central Zone
North Zone	W

Final
West Zone
North Zone	FIL

=== Final ===
25–29 January 1991

North Zone	v	West Zone
729/9 dec (223.1 overs); Raman Lamba 180; Chetan Mankad 3/111		561 (180.1 overs); Ravi Shastri 152; Kapil Dev 2/30
59/0 (9.5 overs); Ajay Jadeja 28*

Match drawn; North Zone won on first innings lead
Keenan Stadium, Jamshedpur

- North Zone won the toss and elected to bat.
