= New Zealand cricket team in India in 1988–89 =

International cricket tour

New Zealand's tour of India in 1988-89
	India	New Zealand
- Dates: 1 November 1988 – 19 December 1988
Captains	Dilip Vengsarkar	John Wright

Test series
- Result: India won the 3-match series 2–1
Most runs	Kris Srikkanth (240)	John Wright (228)
Most wickets	Arshad Ayub (21)	Richard Hadlee (18)

One Day International series
- Results: India won the 5-match series 4–0
Most runs	Mohammad Azharuddin (205)	John Wright (152)
Most wickets	Kris Srikkanth (11)	Martin Snedden (5)

The New Zealand national cricket team toured India in the 1988–89 season to play three Test matches and five ODIs. India won the 3-match Test series 2-1 and the 5-match ODI series 4-0 (5th ODI was abandoned without a ball bowled).

== Test series ==
=== 1st Test ===
12–17 November 1988
Scorecard

India	v	New Zealand
384/9d (142 overs); Navjot Singh Sidhu 116 (295); Richard Hadlee 5/65 (30 overs)		189 (122.3 overs); Andrew Jones 45 (132); Arshad Ayub 4/51 (48 overs)
141/1d (28 overs); Kris Srikkanth 58* (73); Evan Gray 1/39 (6 overs)		164 (78.4 overs); John Wright 58 (144); Arshad Ayub 4/53 (35.4 overs)

India won by 172 runs
M. Chinnaswamy Stadium, Bangalore
Umpires: SK Ghosh (Ind) and Piloo Reporter (Ind)

- India won the toss and chose to bat.
- Chris Kuggeleijn (NZ) made his Test debut.
- Navjot Singh Sidhu (Ind) scored his first century in Tests.

=== 2nd Test ===
24–29 November 1988
Scorecard

New Zealand	v	India
236 (93.3 overs); John Bracewell 52 (100); Ravi Shastri 4/45 (18 overs)		234 (75.5 overs); Kris Srikkanth 94 (137); Richard Hadlee 6/49 (20.5 overs)
279 (115 overs); Andrew Jones 78 (175); Arshad Ayub 5/50 (33 overs)		145 (49.4 overs); Arun Lal 47 (86); John Bracewell 6/51 (17.4 overs)

New Zealand won by 136 runs
Wankhede Stadium, Bombay
Umpires: Ram Gupta (Ind) and VK Ramaswamy (Ind)
Player of the match: John Bracewell (NZ)

- New Zealand won the toss and chose to bat.
- Rashid Patel (Ind) made his Test debut.

=== 3rd Test ===
2–6 December 1988
Scorecard

New Zealand	v	India
254 (95 overs); Mark Greatbatch 90* (244); Arshad Ayub 4/55 (30 overs)		358 (106.3 overs); Mohammad Azharuddin 81 (134); Martin Snedden 4/69 (18.3 overs)
124 (65.3 overs); John Wright 62 (189); Kapil Dev 3/21 (10 overs)		22/0 (2.1 overs); Kris Srikkanth 18* (12)

India won by 10 wickets
Lal Bahadur Shastri Stadium, Hyderabad (Deccan)
Umpires: SK Ghosh (Ind) and Ram Gupta (Ind)

- New Zealand won the toss and chose to bat.
- Sanjeev Sharma (Ind) made his Test debut.

== One Day Internationals (ODIs) ==
India won the series 4–0, with one match abandoned.

=== 1st ODI ===
10 December 1988
Scorecard

New Zealand; 196/9 (50 overs)	v	India; 197/6 (46.2 overs)
KR Rutherford 67 (121); K Srikkanth 5/27 (7 overs)		K Srikkanth 70 (87); W Watson 2/37 (10 overs)

India won by 4 wickets
Indira Priyadarshini Stadium, Visakhapatnam
Umpires: S Banerjee and RV Ramani
Player of the match: K Srikkanth (IND)

- India won the toss and elected to field.
- VB Chandrasekhar (IND) made his ODI debut.

=== 2nd ODI ===
12 December 1988
Scorecard

New Zealand; 160/7 (45 overs)	v	India; 161/5 (41.3 overs)
JG Wright 39 (59); Maninder Singh 2/23 (9 overs)		NS Sidhu 67 (108); W Watson 2/33 (7.3 overs)

India won by 5 wickets
Barabati Stadium, Cuttack
Umpires: DN Dotiwalla and SB Kulkarni
Player of the match: NS Sidhu (IND)

- New Zealand won the toss and elected to bat.
- Because of the early twilight in this region, the match was reduced from 50 overs to 45 overs.

=== 3rd ODI ===
15 December 1988
Scorecard

India; 222/6 (45 overs)	v	New Zealand; 169/9 (45 overs)
VB Chandrasekhar 53 (77); EJ Gray 2/26 (5 overs)		MJ Greatbatch 64 (97); K Srikkanth 5/32 (6 overs)

India won by 53 runs
Nehru Stadium, Indore
Umpires: RB Gupta and RS Rathore
Player of the match: AK Sharma (IND)

- New Zealand won the toss and elected to field.
- The match was reduced before play started to 45 overs per side.

=== 4th ODI ===
17 December 1988
Scorecard

New Zealand; 278/3 (50 overs)	v	India; 282/8 (47.1 overs)
MJ Greatbatch 84* (67); M Venkataramana 2/36 (10 overs)		M Azharuddin 108* (65); DK Morrison 3/50 (10 overs)

India won by 2 wickets
Moti Bagh Stadium, Vadodara
Umpires: PG Pandit and VK Ramaswamy
Player of the match: M Azharuddin (IND)

- New Zealand won the toss and elected to bat.
- M Venkataramana and RGM Patel (both IND) made their ODI debuts.
- Azharuddin scored the fastest ODI century at the time of 62 balls.

=== 5th ODI ===
19 December 1988
Scorecard

India	v	New Zealand

Match abandoned
Maulana Azad Stadium, Jammu

- No toss
