= Ajaz Patel =

New Zealander cricketer (born 1988)

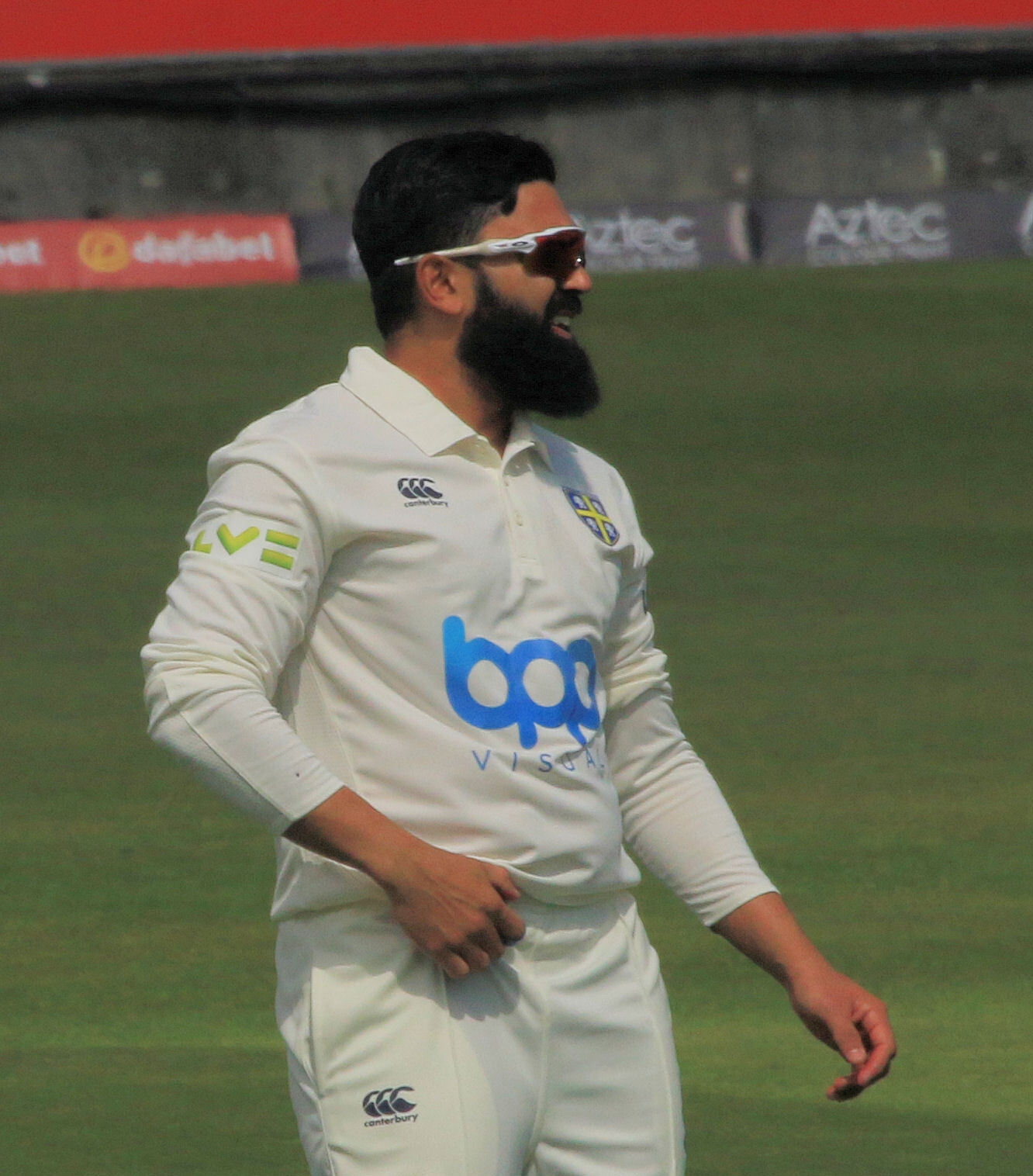
- Patel playing for Durham in 2023

Personal information
- Full name: Ajaz Yunus Patel
- Born: 21 October 1988 (age 38); Mumbai, Maharashtra, India
- Height: 5 ft 6 in (168 cm)
- Batting: Left-handed
- Bowling: Slow left-arm orthodox
- Role: Bowler

International information
- National side: New Zealand (2018–present)
- Test debut (cap 274): 16 November 2018 v Pakistan
- Last Test: 18 December 2025 v West Indies
- T20I debut (cap 79): 31 October 2018 v Pakistan
- Last T20I: 10 September 2021 v Bangladesh
- T20I shirt no.: 24

Domestic team information
- Years: Team
- 2012/13–present: Central Districts
- 2019: Yorkshire
- 2022: Glamorgan
- 2023: Durham
- 2026: Leicestershire

Career statistics
Competition	Test	T20I	FC	LA
Matches	22	7	127	57
Runs scored	219	7	2,264	307
Batting average	11.52	3.50	15.61	13.95
100s/50s	0/0	0/0	0/6	0/0
Top score	35	4	62	45
Balls bowled	5,020	156	28,448	2,806
Wickets	91	11	446	60
Bowling average	28.82	10.00	33.28	40.46
5 wickets in innings	7	0	29	0
10 wickets in match	2	0	6	0
Best bowling	10/119	4/16	10/119	3/31
Catches/stumpings	10/–	0/–	89/–	29/–
Medal record
Men's Cricket
Representing New Zealand
ICC World Test Championship
Winner	2019–2021
- Source: ESPNcricinfo, 26 September 2026

Ajaz Yunus Patel (born 21 October 1988) is a New Zealand cricketer who plays for Central Districts in domestic cricket. He emigrated with his family from Mumbai when he was eight years old, and was formerly a left-arm seam bowler. Patel is a slow left-arm orthodox spin bowler.

He made his international debut for the New Zealand cricket team in October 2018. He was the first Muslim from New Zealand to play for the national team. The following month, he made his Test debut for New Zealand, taking five wickets in the second innings. In May 2020, New Zealand Cricket awarded him with a central contract, ahead of the 2020–21 season.

In December 2021, in the second Test against India, Patel became the third bowler in Test cricket to take all ten wickets in an innings. Jim Laker and Anil Kumble were the others to do so. However, New Zealand still met with a heavy defeat in the match. This makes Patel the only one of the three to end up on the losing team after this achievement.

== Personal life ==
Born in Mumbai, India into a Gujarati Muslim family, Patel is a practising Muslim.

== Domestic career ==
Patel made his List A debut on 27 December 2015 in the 2015–16 Ford Trophy. He took the most wickets in the 2015–16 Plunket Shield season, with 43 dismissals. He was also the leading wicket-taker in the following season, with 44 dismissals.

In April 2018, Patel was named the Men's Domestic Player of the Year at the New Zealand Cricket Awards. He finished the 2017–18 Plunket Shield season as the leading wicket-taker, with 48 dismissals in nine matches. In June 2018, he was awarded a contract with Central Districts for the 2018–19 season. In July 2022, Patel was signed by Glamorgan to play in their final four matches of the County Championship in England, he took a total of 14 wickets.

== International career ==
In July 2018, Patel was named in New Zealand's Test squad for their series against Pakistan. In October 2018, he was named in New Zealand's Twenty20 International (T20I) squad, also for their series against Pakistan. He made his T20I debut for New Zealand against Pakistan on 31 October 2018. During the same tour, he was also added to New Zealand's One Day International (ODI) squad, but he did not play in the ODI series. He made his Test debut for New Zealand against Pakistan on 16 November 2018. He took five wickets in the second innings, with New Zealand winning by four runs, and was named the man of the match. In August 2021, Patel was named in New Zealand's ODI squad for their tour of Pakistan.

=== India 2021: Ten wickets ===
In November 2021, Patel was named in New Zealand's Test squad for their two-match series in India. The first Test finished in a draw late on day five, with Patel taking 2/90 in the first innings, and 1/60 in the second innings of the match. The second Test started on 3 December 2021, with Patel taking all ten wickets in the first innings of the match, finishing with figures of 10/119 from 47.5 overs. Patel became the third bowler, after Jim Laker in 1956 and Anil Kumble in 1999, to take all ten wickets in an innings of a Test match. In the second innings, Patel took a further four wickets, finishing the match with 14/225, the best bowling figures in a Test match against India and also the best for a visiting player in Asia.

=== 2023 ===
In November 2023, he was selected in New Zealand's squad for the test series against Bangladesh. In the first Test, he picked up 6 wickets across the two innings. In the second Test which New Zealand won, he picked up 8 wickets across two innings.

=== 2024 ===
During the New Zealand tour of India, Patel was made Player of the Match in the third and final Test for his 5/103 & 6/57, helping New Zealand win the series 3-0 (3), India's first whitewash at home.

=== 2025 ===
Ajaz was selected for the final Test against the West Indies at Mount Maunganui where he took 6 wickets and together with Jacob Duffy helped force a win late on the last day.

== See also ==
- List of New Zealand cricketers who have taken five-wicket hauls on Test debut
