= English cricket team in India in 2012–13 =

International cricket tour

England cricket team in India in 2012–13
	India	England
- Dates: 30 October 2012 – 27 January 2013
Captains	MS Dhoni	Alastair Cook (Tests & ODIs); Eoin Morgan (T20Is)

Test series
- Result: England won the 4-match series 2–1
Most runs	Cheteshwar Pujara (438)	Alastair Cook (562)
Most wickets	Pragyan Ojha (20)	Graeme Swann (20)
- Player of the series: Alastair Cook (Eng)

One Day International series
- Results: India won the 5-match series 3–2
Most runs	Suresh Raina (277)	Ian Bell (234)
Most wickets	Ravindra Jadeja (9)	James Tredwell (11)
- Player of the series: Suresh Raina (Ind)

Twenty20 International series
- Results: 2-match series drawn 1–1
Most runs	MS Dhoni (62)	Alex Hales (98)
Most wickets	Yuvraj Singh (6)	Tim Bresnan (3); Luke Wright (3)
- Player of the series: Yuvraj Singh (Ind)

The England cricket team toured India from 30 October 2012 to 27 January 2013. The tour consisted of four Test matches, five One Day Internationals and two Twenty20 International matches. A three-day training camp was held from 26 to 28 October at the International Cricket Council Global Cricket Academy in Dubai, United Arab Emirates, before the tour. The England team returned to the United Kingdom after the Twenty20 series and returned in the new year for the One Day International series. During the intervening period, India hosted Pakistan for two T20Is and three ODIs. At the conclusion of the tour, the English team travelled to New Zealand.

England's 2–1 Test series win was their first series victory in India since the 1984–85 tour. The former England captain Michael Vaughan said that the series victory was bigger than the 2010–11 Ashes series victory in Australia. He said of Alastair Cook that "he has led England to probably their biggest achievement in many, many years".

This was the last time India lost a test series at home until 2024.

On 23 December 2012, Sachin Tendulkar announced his retirement from ODI cricket.

== Squads ==
Tests		T20Is		ODIs	
India	England	India	England	India	England
MS Dhoni (c & wk); Ravichandran Ashwin; Parvinder Awana ^{4}; Piyush Chawla ^{4}; Ashok Dinda ^{2}; Gautam Gambhir; Harbhajan Singh; Ravindra Jadeja ^{4}; Zaheer Khan; Virat Kohli; Pragyan Ojha; Cheteshwar Pujara; Ajinkya Rahane; Virender Sehwag; Ishant Sharma; Sachin Tendulkar; Murali Vijay; Umesh Yadav; Yuvraj Singh	Alastair Cook (c); Stuart Broad (vc); James Anderson; Jonny Bairstow (wk); Ian Bell; Tim Bresnan; Nick Compton; Steven Finn; Graham Onions; Stuart Meaker ^{1}; Eoin Morgan; Monty Panesar; Samit Patel; Kevin Pietersen; Matt Prior (wk); Joe Root; Graeme Swann; James Tredwell ^{3}; Jonathan Trott	MS Dhoni (c & wk); Ravichandran Ashwin; Parvinder Awana; Piyush Chawla; Ashok Dinda; Gautam Gambhir; Ravindra Jadeja; Virat Kohli; Bhuvneshwar Kumar; Abhimanyu Mithun; Ajinkya Rahane; Suresh Raina; Ambati Rayudu^{5}; Rohit Sharma; Manoj Tiwary; Yuvraj Singh	Eoin Morgan (c); Jonny Bairstow (wk); Tim Bresnan; Danny Briggs; Jos Buttler (wk); Jade Dernbach; Alex Hales; James Harris; Michael Lumb; Stuart Meaker; Samit Patel; Joe Root; James Tredwell; Luke Wright	MS Dhoni (c & wk); Ravichandran Ashwin; Ashok Dinda; Gautam Gambhir; Cheteshwar Pujara; Ravindra Jadeja; Virat Kohli (vc); Bhuvneshwar Kumar; Amit Mishra; Ajinkya Rahane; Suresh Raina; Mohammed Shami; Ishant Sharma; Rohit Sharma; Yuvraj Singh	Alastair Cook (c); Ian Bell; Tim Bresnan; Stuart Broad; Danny Briggs; Jos Buttler (wk); Jade Dernbach; Steven Finn; Craig Kieswetter (wk); Stuart Meaker; Eoin Morgan; Samit Patel; Kevin Pietersen; Joe Root; James Tredwell; Chris Woakes

Notes

- ^{1} Stuart Meaker was brought into the England squad as cover for the injured Steven Finn.
- ^{2} Ashok Dinda replaced the injured Umesh Yadav in the Indian squad for the 3rd Test.
- ^{3} James Tredwell was called up to the England test squad as cover for Graeme Swann and Monty Panesar.
- ^{4} Parvinder Awana, Piyush Chawla and Ravindra Jadeja replaced Zaheer Khan, Yuvraj Singh and Harbhajan Singh in the India Test squad for the 4th Test.
- ^{5} Ambati Rayudu replaced Manoj Tiwary

== Tour matches ==
=== First-class: India A v England XI ===
30 Oct–1 Nov 2012
Scorecard

India A	v	England XI
369 (90.1 overs); Manoj Tiwary 93 (150); Tim Bresnan 3/59 (20 overs)		426 (119.5 overs); Alastair Cook 119 (269); Yuvraj Singh 5/94 (26.5 overs)
124/4 (40 overs); Ajinkya Rahane 54 (98); James Anderson 2/20 (7 overs)

Match drawn
Brabourne Stadium, Mumbai
Umpires: Sudhir Asnani (Ind) and Shavir Tarapore (Ind)

- India A won the toss and elected to bat.

=== Three-day: Mumbai A v England XI ===
3–5 Nov 2012
Scorecard

England XI	v	Mumbai A
345/9d (93 overs); Jonny Bairstow 118 (177); Shardul Thakur 3/53 (20 overs)		286 (101.4 overs); Hiken Shah 92 (194); Samit Patel 3/44 (11.4 overs)
149/2 (52 overs); Nick Compton 64* (162); Shardul Thakur 1/20 (10 overs)

Match drawn
DY Patil Stadium, Navi Mumbai
Umpires: Rajesh Deshpande (Ind) and CK Nandan (Ind)

- England XI won the toss and elected to bat.

=== First-class: Haryana v England XI ===
8–11 Nov 2012
Scorecard

England XI	v	Haryana
521 (118.1 overs); Kevin Pietersen 110* (94); Amit Mishra 4/67 (17.1 overs)		334 (112.4 overs); Rahul Dewan 143* (315); Tim Bresnan 3/66 (21 overs)
254/6d (75.2 overs); Jonathan Trott 101* (183); Sanjay Budhwar 3/51 (20 overs)		133/6 (42 overs); Nitin Saini 50 (84); Tim Bresnan 2/13 (7 overs)

Match drawn
Sardar Patel Stadium B Ground, Motera, Ahmedabad
Umpires: Amiesh Saheba (Ind) and Chettithody Shamsuddin (Ind)

- England XI won the toss and elected to bat.

=== List A: India A v England XI ===
6 January 2013
09:00
Scorecard

India A 224/4 (39 overs)	v	England XI; 175 (36 overs)
Murali Vijay 76 (75); Jade Dernbach 2/23 (7 overs)		Ian Bell 91 (89); Ashok Menaria 3/43 (7 overs)

India A won by 53 runs (D/L method)
Palam A Ground, Delhi
Umpires: Nitin Menon (Ind) and Rohan Pandit (Ind)

- England XI won the toss and elected to field.
- Match reduced to 39 overs-a-side after a delayed start and bad light during the India A innings.

=== List A: Delhi v England XI ===
8 January 2013
12:00 (D/N)
Scorecard

England XI; 294/5 (50 overs)	v	Delhi; 295/4 (48.3 overs)
Ian Bell 108 (125); Varun Sood 3/45 (10 overs)		Shikhar Dhawan 110 (109); James Tredwell 2/49 (9 overs)

Delhi won by 6 wickets
Feroz Shah Kotla Ground, Delhi
Umpires: Krishnamachari Bharatan (Ind) and Anil Chaudhary (Ind)

- England XI won the toss and elected to bat.
- Vaibhav Rawal (Delhi) made his List A debut.

== Test series ==
=== 1st Test ===
15–19 November 2012
Scorecard

India	v	England
521/8d (160 overs); Cheteshwar Pujara 206* (389); Graeme Swann 5/144 (51 overs)		191 (74.2 overs); Matt Prior 48 (100); Pragyan Ojha 5/45 (22.2 overs)
80/1 (15.3 overs); Cheteshwar Pujara 41* (51); Graeme Swann 1/46 (7.3 overs)		406 (f/o) (154.3 overs); Alastair Cook 176 (374); Pragyan Ojha 4/120 (55 overs)

India won by 9 wickets
Sardar Patel Stadium, Motera, Ahmedabad
Umpires: Aleem Dar (Pak) and Tony Hill (NZ)
Player of the match: Cheteshwar Pujara (Ind)

- India won the toss and elected to bat.
- Nick Compton (Eng) made his Test debut.

=== 2nd Test ===
23–27 November 2012
Scorecard

India	v	England
327 (115.1 overs); Cheteshwar Pujara 135 (350); Monty Panesar 5/129 (47 overs)		413 (121.3 overs); Kevin Pietersen 186 (233); Pragyan Ojha 5/143 (40 overs)
142 (44.1 overs); Gautam Gambhir 65 (142); Monty Panesar 6/81 (22 overs)		58/0 (9.4 overs); Nick Compton 30* (28)

England won by 10 wickets
Wankhede Stadium, Mumbai
Umpires: Aleem Dar (Pak) and Tony Hill (NZ)
Player of the match: Kevin Pietersen (Eng)

- India won the toss and elected to bat.
- Virender Sehwag (Ind) played in his 100th Test.

=== 3rd Test ===
5–9 December 2012
Scorecard

India	v	England
316 (105 overs); Sachin Tendulkar 76 (155); Monty Panesar 4/90 (40 overs)		523 (167.3 overs); Alastair Cook 190 (377); Pragyan Ojha 4/142 (52 overs)
247 (84.4 overs); Ravichandran Ashwin 91* (157); James Anderson 3/38 (15.4 overs)		41/3 (12.1 overs); Ian Bell 28* (28); Ravichandran Ashwin 2/31 (6.1 overs)

England won by 7 wickets
Eden Gardens, Kolkata
Umpires: Kumar Dharmasena (SL) and Rod Tucker (Aus)
Player of the match: Alastair Cook (Eng)

- India won the toss and elected to bat.
- Yuvraj Singh (Ind) played his last test match.

=== 4th Test ===
13–17 December 2012
Scorecard

England	v	India
330 (145.5 overs); Kevin Pietersen 73 (188); Piyush Chawla 4/69 (21.5 overs)		326/9d (143 overs); Virat Kohli 103 (295); James Anderson 4/81 (32 overs)
352/4d (154 overs); Jonathan Trott 143 (310); Ravichandran Ashwin 2/99 (38 overs)

Match drawn
Vidarbha Cricket Association Stadium, Nagpur
Umpires: Kumar Dharmasena (SL) and Rod Tucker (Aus)
Player of the match: James Anderson (Eng)

- England won the toss and elected to bat.
- Joe Root (Eng) and Ravindra Jadeja (Ind) made their Test debuts.

=== Statistics ===
==== Individual ====
Statistic	India		England	
Most series runs	Cheteshwar Pujara	438	Alastair Cook	562
Highest innings	Cheteshwar Pujara	206*	Alastair Cook	190
Most centuries	Cheteshwar Pujara	2	Alastair Cook	3
Most fifties	Gautam Gambhir; Ravichandran Ashwin; MS Dhoni	2	Kevin Pietersen; Matt Prior	2
Most wickets	Pragyan Ojha	20	Graeme Swann	20
Most five-wicket hauls	Pragyan Ojha	2	Monty Panesar	2
Best innings figure	Pragyan Ojha	5/45	Monty Panesar	6/81
Best match figure	Pragyan Ojha	9/165	Monty Panesar	11/210
Most catches (wicket-keepers excluded)	Virender Sehwag	5	Graeme Swann; Jonathan Trott	5
Most stumpings	MS Dhoni	10	Matt Prior	7

==== Team ====
Statistic	India	England
Highest team innings	521/8d	523
Lowest team innings	80/1	41/3
Tosses won	3	1

== T20I series ==
=== 1st T20I ===
20 December 2012
19:00 (D/N)
Scorecard

England; 157/6 (20 overs)	v	India; 158/5 (17.5 overs)
Alex Hales 56 (35); Yuvraj Singh 3/19 (4 overs)		Yuvraj Singh 38 (21); Tim Bresnan 2/26 (3 overs)

India won by 5 wickets
Subrata Roy Sahara Stadium, Pune
Umpires: Sudhir Asnani (Ind) and Chettithody Shamsuddin (Ind)
Player of the match: Yuvraj Singh (Ind)

- India won the toss and elected to field.
- Stuart Meaker, James Tredwell (both Eng) and Parvinder Awana (Ind) made their T20I debuts.

=== 2nd T20I ===
22 December 2012
19:00 (D/N)
Scorecard

India; 177/8 (20 overs)	v	England; 181/4 (20 overs)
MS Dhoni 38 (18); Jade Dernbach 2/37 (4 overs)		Michael Lumb 50 (34); Yuvraj Singh 3/17 (4 overs)

England won by 6 wickets
Wankhede Stadium, Mumbai
Umpires: Vineet Kulkarni (Ind) and S. Ravi (Ind)
Player of the match: Eoin Morgan (Eng)

- England won the toss and elected to field.
- Joe Root (Eng) made his T20I debut.

== ODI series ==
=== 1st ODI ===
11 January 2013
12:00 (D/N)
Scorecard

England; 325/4 (50 overs)	v	India; 316/9 (50 overs)
Ian Bell 85 (96); Ashok Dinda 2/53 (8 overs)		Yuvraj Singh 61 (54); James Tredwell 4/44 (10 overs)

England won by 9 runs
Saurashtra Cricket Association Stadium, Rajkot
Umpires: Steve Davis (Aus) and S. Ravi (Ind)
Player of the match: James Tredwell (Eng)

- England won the toss and elected to bat.
- Joe Root (Eng) made his ODI debut.
- Ashok Dinda (Ind) Played his last ODI.

=== 2nd ODI ===
15 January 2013
12:00 (D/N)
Scorecard

India; 285/6 (50 overs)	v	England; 158 (36 overs)
MS Dhoni 72 (66); Steven Finn 2/51 (10 overs)		Kevin Pietersen 42 (44); Bhuvneshwar Kumar 3/29 (10 overs)

India won by 127 runs
Nehru Stadium, Kochi
Umpires: Steve Davis (Aus) and Vineet Kulkarni (Ind)
Player of the match: Ravindra Jadeja (Ind)

- India won the toss and elected to bat.

=== 3rd ODI ===
19 January 2013
12:00 (D/N)
Scorecard

England; 155 (42.2 overs)	v	India; 157/3 (28.1 overs)
Joe Root 39 (57); Ravindra Jadeja 3/19 (6.2 overs)		Virat Kohli 77* (79); James Tredwell 2/29 (7 overs)

India won by 7 wickets
HEC International Cricket Stadium Complex, Ranchi
Umpires: Steve Davis (Aus) and S. Ravi (Ind)
Player of the match: Virat Kohli (Ind)

- India won the toss and elected to field.
- Craig Kieswetter (Eng) played his last ODI.

=== 4th ODI ===
23 January 2013
12:00 (D/N)
Scorecard

England; 257/7 (50 overs)	v	India; 258/5 (47.3 overs)
Kevin Pietersen 76 (93); Ravindra Jadeja 3/39 (10 overs)		Suresh Raina 89* (79); James Tredwell 2/54 (10 overs)

India won by 5 wickets
Punjab Cricket Association Stadium, Mohali
Umpires: Sudhir Asnani (Ind) and Steve Davis (Aus)
Player of the match: Suresh Raina (Ind)

- India won the toss and elected to field.

=== 5th ODI ===
27 January 2013
09:00
Scorecard

India; 226 (49.4 overs)	v	England; 227/3 (47.2 overs)
Suresh Raina 83 (98); Tim Bresnan 4/45 (9.4 overs)		Ian Bell 113* (143); Ravindra Jadeja 1/26 (7.2 overs)

England won by 7 wickets
HPCA Stadium, Dharamsala
Umpires: Sudhir Asnani (Ind) and Steve Davis (Aus)
Player of the match: Ian Bell (Eng)

- England won the toss and elected to field.
- Gautam Gambhir (Ind) and Samit Patel (Eng) played their last ODI.
