= V. B. Chandrasekhar =

Indian cricketer (1961–2019)

V. B. Chandrasekharan
Personal information
- Full name: Vakkadai Biksheswaran Chandrasekharan
- Born: 21 August 1961; Madras, Madras State, India
- Died: 15 August 2019 (aged 57); Chennai, Tamil Nadu, India
- Batting: Right-handed
- Role: Batsman, wicket-keeper

International information
- National side: India
- ODI debut (cap 68): 10 December 1988 v New Zealand
- Last ODI: 8 March 1990 v Australia

Domestic team information
- Years: Team
- 1986/87–1994/95: Tamil Nadu
- 1995/96–1997/98: Goa

Career statistics
Competition	ODI	FC	LA
Matches	7	81	41
Runs scored	88	4,999	1,053
Batting average	12.57	43.09	26.32
100s/50s	0/1	10/23	0/7
Top score	53	237*	88
Balls bowled	–	150	21
Wickets	–	0	0
Bowling average	–	–	–
5 wickets in innings	–	–	–
10 wickets in match	–	–	–
Best bowling	–	–	–
Catches/stumpings	0/0	54/2	6/1
- Source: CricketArchive, 15 August 2019

Vakkadai Biksheswaran Chandrasekhar (21 August 1961 – 15 August 2019) was an Indian cricketer, who represented the country in seven One Day Internationals (ODIs) during 1988–90.

Born in Madras, Chandrasekhar played for Tamil Nadu and Goa at the domestic level. Making his first-class debut in 1986 for Tamil Nadu, he went on to play for the team till 1994–95. During his period, Chandrasekhar established himself as a key player for Tamil Nadu. He was highly successful in the 1987–88 season accumulating over 551 runs. Chandrasekhar also scored heavily in the 1991–92 season and captained Tamil Nadu for a short period before playing for Goa. All in all, he scored 4,999 runs from 81 matches when he retired from first class cricket. Termed as an "aggressive" player he set the record for the fastest hundred by an Indian in first class cricket. In 2012, he was appointed the coach of Tamil Nadu. Chandrasekhar was also a commentator and ran a cricket academy in Chennai.

== Playing career ==
Chandrasekhar made his first-class debut for Tamil Nadu during the 1986/87 season. He had two equally successful domestic seasons—1987–88 and 1994–95—aggregating 551 and 572 runs respectively. He had been one of the prominent players in Tamil Nadu's Ranji Trophy victory in the former season. In the next season he scored a century off 56 balls in a match in the Irani Trophy, an Indian record in first class cricket at the time. His good performances with the bat at the domestic level earned him a place in the national team when he was chosen for the ODI team against New Zealand in December 1988. Opening the batting with Krishnamachari Srikkanth, his Tamil Nadu partner, Chandrasekhar scored 10 runs in the match which India won by four wickets. He scored his only fifty in the third match of the series; he scored 53 runs from 77 balls in the Indian victory. He was again selected for the Rothmans Cup Triangular Series in 1990 where he scored poorly. After the tournament, he was never selected for the Indian team.

However, his impressive form in domestic cricket led to his being named the captain of Tamil Nadu. He continued to represent the team until 1995/96 when he started playing for Goa. His highest score of 237 not out was achieved against Kerala while playing for Goa in 1995–96; he carried his bat in a team total of 384.

== Other work ==
In July 2012, Chandrasekhar was appointed the coach of Tamil Nadu. Within a year, he was sacked from the position as the team remained seventh in their group in the league stage of the Ranji Trophy and failed in the Vijay Hazare Trophy. He also served on selection panels both at the national and domestic levels and worked as a commentator. Chandrasekhar also ran a cricket academy in Chennai.

== Death ==
Chandrasekhar died by suicide, hanging himself at his Chennai residence on 15 August 2019.
