= Rashid Patel =

Indian cricketer

Cricket information
- Batting: Left-handed
- Bowling: Left-arm fast-medium

International information
- National side: India
- Only Test (cap 183): 24 November 1988 v New Zealand
- Only ODI (cap 69): 17 December 1988 v New Zealand

Career statistics
Competition	Test	ODI
Matches	1	1
Runs scored	0	–
Batting average	0.00	–
100s/50s	0/0	–
Top score	0	–
Balls bowled	84	–
Wickets	0	–
Bowling average	–	–
5 wickets in innings	–	–
10 wickets in match	–	–
Best bowling	–	–
Catches/stumpings	1/–	0/–
- Source: CricketArchive, 1 February 2018

Rashid Ghulam Mohammed Patel (born 1 June 1964) was a left arm fast bowler who represented India. He played for Baroda between 1986–87 and 1996–97 in domestic cricket.

Rashid Patel had a rather unsuccessful career for India. His only Test was at Bombay against New Zealand in 1988–89. Apart from beating the openers' bat a few times early on he made no impression. He scored a pair against Richard Hadlee while batting. In his only one-day match against the same team, he bowled 10 overs for 58 runs without taking a wicket.

He is best remembered for an on-field spat when West Zone played North in the final of the 1990–91 Duleep Trophy at Jamshedpur. It was a bitter match which saw sledging and arguments between the players of the two sides. While North Zone was batting for the second time on the last day, already having taken a decisive lead in the game, Patel pulled out a stump and attacked the North opener Raman Lamba. Patel had earlier ran onto the crease, and Lamba had taken it upon himself to warn Patel, instead of the umpire doing so. That resulted in an argument between Lamba and Patel. The play was called off fifteen minutes before tea on the final day. Patel defended his action arguing that his intention was only to defend himself against Lamba who was rushing towards him wielding his bat, and that he had only hit Lamba's bat thrice and not his person. Four weeks later a three-member disciplinary committee composed of Madhavrao Scindia, M.A.K. Pataudi and Raj Singh Dungarpur banned Patel for 13 months and Lamba for 10 months.
