= Will Young (cricketer) =

New Zealand cricketer (born 1992)

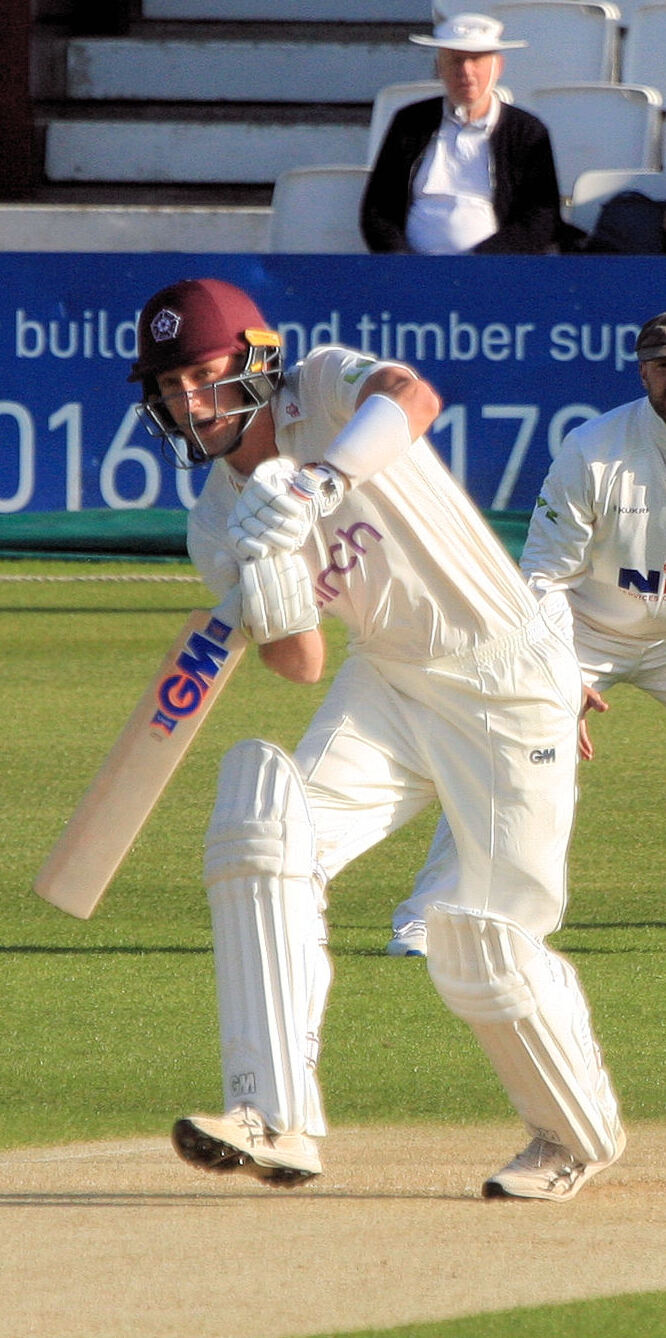
- Young batting for Northamptonshire in 2022

Personal information
- Full name: William Alexander Young
- Born: 22 November 1992 (age 33); New Plymouth, New Zealand
- Height: 1.85 m (6 ft 1 in)
- Batting: Right-handed
- Bowling: Right-arm off break
- Role: Top order batter

International information
- National side: New Zealand (2020–present)
- Test debut (cap 280): 3 December 2020 v West Indies
- Last Test: 2 December 2025 v West Indies
- ODI debut (cap 200): 20 March 2021 v Bangladesh
- Last ODI: 15 November 2026 v India
- ODI shirt no.: 32
- T20I debut (cap 88): 28 March 2021 v Bangladesh
- Last T20I: 10 November 2024 v Sri Lanka
- T20I shirt no.: 32

Domestic team information
- Years: Team
- 2011/12–present: Central Districts
- 2021: Durham
- 2022: Northamptonshire
- 2023–2024: Nottinghamshire
- 2025–2026: Warwickshire

Career statistics
Competition	Test	ODI	T20I	FC
Matches	23	68	20	148
Runs scored	1,215	2,212	344	8,830
Batting average	31.97	35.67	18.10	38.72
100s/50s	0/11	5/12	0/2	16/53
Top score	89	125	56	174*
Catches/stumpings	26/–	33/–	6/–	113/–
Medal record
Men's Cricket
Representing New Zealand
ICC World Test Championship
Winner	2019–2021
ICC Champions Trophy
Runner-up	2025 Pakistan
- Source: ESPNcricinfo, 13 November 2026

William Alexander Young (born 22 November 1992) is a New Zealand professional cricketer who plays as a batsman for the New Zealand cricket team and Central Districts. He was captain of the New Zealand Under-19 cricket team at the 2012 ICC Under-19 Cricket World Cup.

Young made his international debut in December 2020 and has since played international cricket in all formats of the game.

== Career ==
Young attended New Plymouth Boys' High School and in 2010 had a stellar year playing for the school's First XI, scoring nearly 900 runs (including three centuries) during the season. In the 2011/12 New Zealand domestic cricket season he made his first-class debut for Central Districts, becoming the team's captain in December 2015 at just 23 years of age. Under his captaincy the Central Stags won the one-day Ford Trophy in 2016 and the first-class Plunket Shield unbeaten in 2018. Young then elected to step down from the captaincy to focus on his batting and making the New Zealand side.

In December 2018, he was named in New Zealand's Test squad for the series for the first time against Sri Lanka, but he did not play.

In March 2019, Young was named to make his Test cricket debut one day before a Test match between New Zealand and Bangladesh was scheduled to begin at Hagley Oval. However, a terrorist attack in Christchurch on the same afternoon saw the match cancelled by New Zealand Cricket.

Despite not yet having played an international match, in May 2019 he was one of the twenty players awarded an annual NZC contract for the 2019–20 season by New Zealand Cricket.

In May 2019, Young was going to be named as a reserve player for New Zealand in the 2019 Cricket World Cup, but made the decision to undergo shoulder surgery instead after an injury to his right labrum at a training camp.

Despite his shoulder injury, Young scored back-to-back centuries for a New Zealand XI against Australia in a one-day warm-up series of three unofficial ODIs in Brisbane in May 2019. Young averaged more than 100 in the series with consecutive scores of 60, 130 and 111 against the defending Cricket World Cup champions.

In November 2020, Young was named in the New Zealand A cricket team for practice matches against the touring West Indies team. Later the same month, he was named in New Zealand's Test squad for the series against the West Indies. He made his Test debut for New Zealand on 3 December 2020, against the West Indies.

In March 2021, Young was named in New Zealand's One Day International (ODI) squad for their series against Bangladesh. He made his ODI debut for New Zealand on 20 March 2021, against Bangladesh. Later the same month, Young was named in New Zealand's Twenty20 International (T20I) squad, also for their series against Bangladesh. He made his T20I debut for New Zealand on 28 March 2021, against Bangladesh.

In March 2022, in the opening match against the Netherlands, Young scored his first century in ODIs, with an unbeaten 103 runs.

In January 2023 Young hit five consecutive deliveries for six in an over of a T20 match off Auckland spinner Louis Delport. He was dismissed in the final ball of the over attempting to hit the rare six sixes in an over feat.

Young signed a three-match contract with Nottinghamshire in July 2023, going on to make a century on his debut against Surrey.

He rejoined Nottinghamshire for the first half of the 2024 season. In April 2024, Young scored 174 not out against Somerset in an unbroken partnership of 392 with Joe Clarke which set a new record for a third-wicket stand for Nottinghamshire, surpassing the previous mark that had stood for 121 years.

Young was named player of the series in the Black Caps' historic 3-0 test series win in India during October and November 2024. He scored 244 runs in six innings at an average of 44.8, with a highest score of 71.

He was named the overall winner of the Taranaki Sports Awards in November 2025.
