= Rachin Ravindra =

New Zealand cricketer (born 1999)

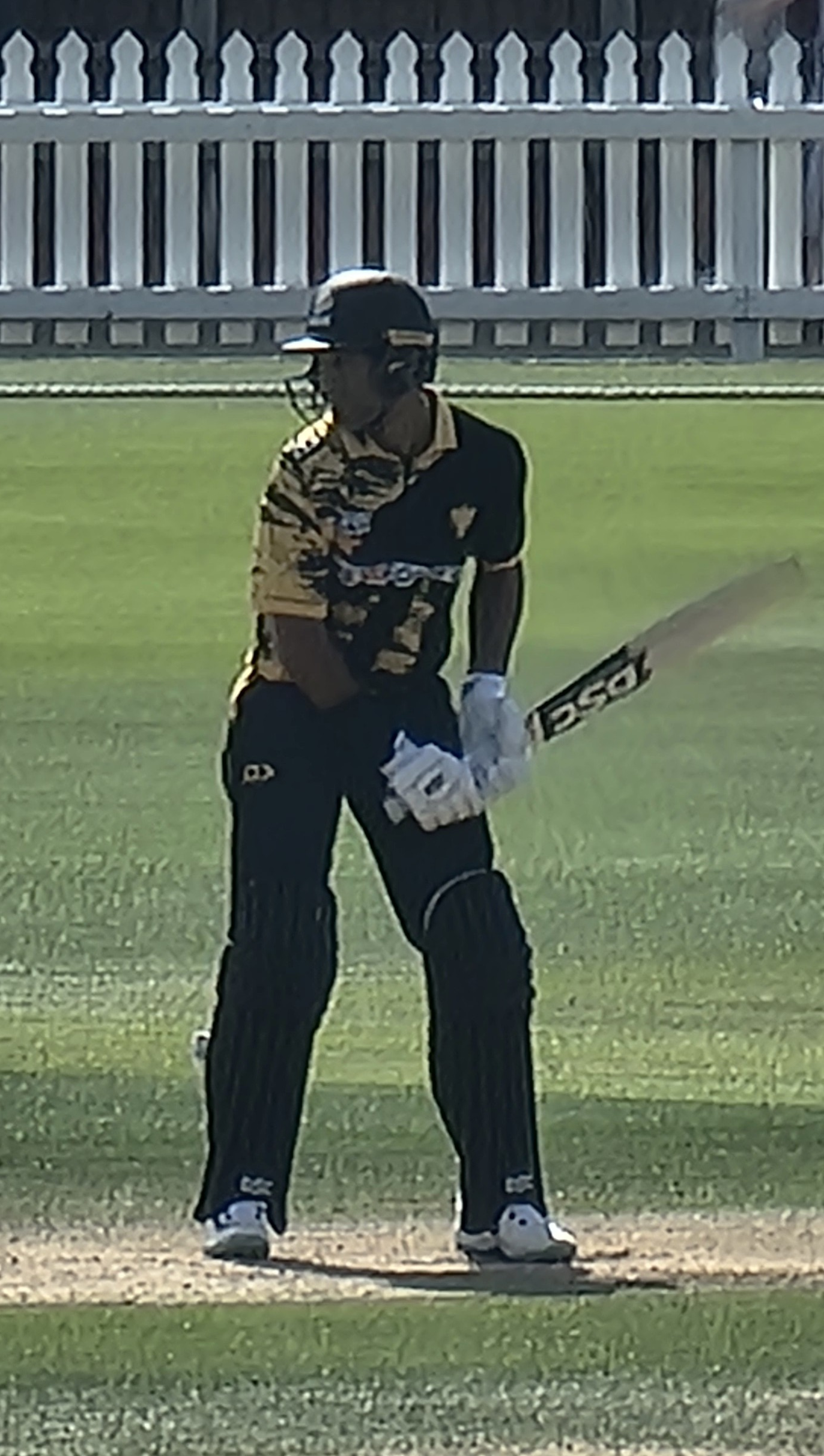
- Rachin with the Wellington Firebirds in 2026.

Personal information
- Born: 18 November 1999 (age 26); Wellington, New Zealand
- Batting: Left-handed
- Bowling: Slow left-arm orthodox
- Role: Batting all-rounder

International information
- National side: New Zealand (2021–present)
- Test debut (cap 282): 25 November 2021 v India
- Last Test: 25 June 2026 v England
- ODI debut (cap 209): 25 March 2023 v Sri Lanka
- Last ODI: 22 November 2025 v England
- ODI shirt no.: 8
- T20I debut (cap 90): 1 September 2021 v Bangladesh
- Last T20I: 8 March 2026 v India
- T20I shirt no.: 8

Domestic team information
- Years: Team
- 2018/19–present: Wellington
- 2022: Durham
- 2024–2025: Chennai Super Kings
- 2024–present: Washington Freedom
- 2025: Manchester Originals
- 2026: Kolkata Knight Riders
- 2026: Welsh Fire

Career statistics
Competition	Test	ODI	T20I	FC
Matches	24	39	52	68
Runs scored	1,865	1,424	759	4,552
Batting average	47.82	41.88	20.51	42.54
100s/50s	5/7	5/6	0/3	11/19
Top score	240	123*	69	240
Balls bowled	1,050	979	390	5,407
Wickets	11	21	26	63
Bowling average	47.90	45.28	17.46	49.07
5 wickets in innings	0	0	0	1
10 wickets in match	0	0	0	0
Best bowling	3/33	4/60	4/27	6/89
Catches/stumpings	12/–	14/–	19/–	35/–
Medal record
Men's Cricket
Representing New Zealand
ICC T20 World Cup
Runner-up	2026 India & Sri Lanka
ICC Champions Trophy
Runner-up	2025 Pakistan
- Source: ESPNcricinfo, 29 June 2026

Rachin Ravindra (born 18 November 1999) is a New Zealand professional cricketer who bats left-handed and bowls left-arm orthodox spin. He represents the New Zealand national team and Wellington. As of June 2026, he is signed with the Washington Freedom in Major League Cricket (MLC) and the Kolkata Knight Riders in the Indian Premier League (IPL).

== Early life ==
Rachin Ravindra was born in Wellington on 18 November 1999 to parents from Bangalore, Karnataka. His father Ravi Krishnamurthy, a software architect, played club-level cricket in Bangalore before settling in New Zealand in 1997. His grandfather Balakrishna Adiga is an educationist and former principal of Vijaya College.

Rachin began his cricket journey after being influenced by Sachin Tendulkar since childhood. He began playing cricket in Wellington at the age of five, and travelled to India every year to play club cricket for Hutt Hawks Cricket Club, run by his father.

== Career ==
Rachin was a part of New Zealand's squads for the 2016 and the 2018 Under-19 World Cups. Following the conclusion of the 2018 edition, the International Cricket Council (ICC) named Rachin Ravindra as one of the rising stars of the competition. In June 2018, he was awarded a contract with Wellington for the 2018–19 season.

Rachin made his List A debut for New Zealand A against Pakistan A in October 2018. He made his first-class debut for New Zealand A against the same team later in the month. In November 2019, batting for Wellington against Auckland in the 2019–20 Ford Trophy, he scored his first century in List A cricket. In March 2020, in round six of the 2019–20 Plunket Shield season, he scored his maiden century in first-class cricket.

In June 2020, Rachin was offered a contract by Wellington ahead of the 2020–21 domestic cricket season. In November, he was named in the New Zealand A cricket team for practice matches against the touring West Indies team. In the first practice match, he scored a century, with 112 runs.

In April 2021, Rachin was named in New Zealand's Test squad for their series against England, and for the final of the 2019–21 ICC World Test Championship. In August, he was named in New Zealand's Twenty20 International (T20I) squad for their tour of Bangladesh, and in the One Day International (ODI) squad for their tour of Pakistan. Rachin Ravindra made his T20I debut on 1 September that year, against Bangladesh.

In November 2021, Rachin was named in New Zealand's Test squad for their series against India. He made his Test debut on 25 November 2021, for New Zealand against India. In June 2022, he was signed by Durham County Cricket Club to play in the County Championship in England. Later that month, on his debut for Durham, he scored a century against Worcestershire. He went on to convert that into his maiden double century, scoring 217 runs. He made his ODI debut for New Zealand against Sri Lanka, on 25 March 2023.

2023 proved to be a breakthrough season for Rachin, amassing three centuries and 578 runs at the 2023 World Cup, ending the year with 820 ODI runs at 41, with a strike rate of 108.03, and winning the 2023 ICC Men's Emerging Cricketer of the Year award.

In February 2024, during the first Test of South Africa's tour of New Zealand, batting at No. 4, Rachin scored 240, his maiden Test century. It is the highest maiden Test century by a New Zealand batter.

=== ICC Men's Cricket World Cup 2023 ===
Rachin was named in New Zealand's squad for the 2023 World Cup. He was not officially in contention to make it into the final squad for the 2023 World Cup, but he found his way into the 15 man squad replacing injured Michael Bracewell. Rachin was not a first choice option for New Zealand going into the World Cup preparations in full swing, as he was predominantly used by New Zealand team as a spin bowling all-rounder who could bat way down the order. However, a fitness concerns to New Zealand skipper Kane Williamson brought about a paradigm shift approach within the team management which opted to promote Rachin to bat at number three position in New Zealand's opening match against England. Prior to the start of the World Cup, he didn't bat at a position higher than number 6 slot in the limited ODI appearances he featured for the Black Caps.

In the opening match against England, batting at no. 3 in place of Williamson, he became only the fourth Kiwi player to hit a century on World Cup debut by scoring 123* runs off just 96 balls. It was also coincidentally his maiden ODI century. This was also the fastest century by a New Zealand player in World Cup, reaching 100 in 82 balls. He also became the youngest New Zealand player to score a World Cup century at the age of 23 years and 321 days. Also, along with Devon Conway, he registered the fourth highest partnership in World Cup history, and helped his team beat the defending champions. On 28 October 2023, during a group stage match against Australia, Rachin scored his second century and gave New Zealand a glimmer of hope in a high scoring run chase of 389 at Dharamsala which New Zealand lost by five runs, a match that aggregated 771 runs to become the World Cup match with the highest aggregate involving the combination of both teams' totals. He became only the second batter in World Cup history after Sachin Tendulkar to have scored two centuries in World Cups at the age of 23. Soon after another century against Pakistan, he became the first cricketer to score three centuries and two 50s in his debut World Cup. Rachin was also second on the leaderboard for most runs scored in the World Cup next to Quinton de Kock.

On 4 November 2023, during a group stage match against Pakistan, Rachin became the second youngest batter after Sachin Tendulkar in the ODI World Cup history to complete 500 runs. He also broke Tendulkar's record of most World Cup centuries before the age of 24 years when he completed his century against Pakistan. He also became the first batter in World Cup history to score three centuries on World Cup debut. He also became the first New Zealand batter to score three World Cup centuries and set the record for most World Cup centuries scored by a player for New Zealand in World Cup history.

On 9 November 2023, during a group stage match against Sri Lanka, he broke Jonny Bairstow's record for having scored the most number of runs by a player in his debut World Cup with 550 runs. He also surpassed Tendulkar's record for having scored the most runs in a single edition of the World Cup before turning 25 with a tally of 550 runs in 9 matches. He ended his campaign having scored 578 runs in 10 innings at an average of 64.22.

=== ICC Men's T20 World Cup 2024 ===
In May 2024, he was named in New Zealand's squad for the 2024 ICC Men's T20 World Cup tournament. Rachin played three of New Zealand's four games before the team exited the tournament at the group stage following defeats to Afghanistan and the West Indies. He scored 17 runs and picked up 2 wickets in 3 innings.

=== ICC Champions Trophy 2025 ===
In January 2025, Rachin was named as part of New Zealand's squad for the 2025 ICC Champions Trophy. He did not play New Zealand's first game, a win against Pakistan, due to continuing recovery from a facial injury he sustained in the Pakistan-New Zealand tri-series earlier in February. On his Champions Trophy debut against Bangladesh, Rachin scored 112 runs off of 105 balls, becoming the first player in history to score a century on debut in both the World Cup and Champions Trophy. In the semifinal against South Africa, Rachin scored another century, his first in an ODI knockout match. In the final against India, he scored 37 runs off 29 balls in a losing cause. He was the leading run scorer in the Champions Trophy, amassing 263 runs with an average of 65.75, and was named as the Player of the Tournament on 9 March 2025.

=== ICC Men's T20 World Cup 2026 ===
In January 2026, Ravindra was named in New Zealand's squad for the 2026 ICC Men's T20 World Cup. He batted at No.3 for the majority of the tournament. He started modestly, scoring a golden duck in New Zealand's opening match against Afghanistan, but scored a crucial unbeaten 59* off 39 balls against Canada. In New Zealand's subsequent fixture against Sri Lanka, Ravindra scored 32 runs off 22 balls and took a career-best bowling spell of 4 wickets for 27 runs, winning the Player of the Match award.. He took another three-wicket haul against England, taking 3 wickets for 19 runs. In the final against India, Ravindra scored only 1 run off 2 balls with the bat and took 1 wicket for 32 runs as New Zealand finished as runners-up yet again. While he scored only 146 runs with the bat at an average of 20.86 at a strike rate of 120.66, Ravindra finished as New Zealand's highest wicket-taker with the ball, taking 13 wickets at an average of 11.29 and an economy rate of 7.18.

=== Indian Premier League ===
In December 2023, Rachin was signed by the Chennai Super Kings in the player auction for the 2024 Indian Premier League.

On 22 March 2024, Rachin made his Indian Premier League debut as a player of Chennai Super Kings against Royal Challengers Bangalore. He scored the first six for his team in the league. He scored 37 runs in just 15 balls before being caught out by Rajat Patidar of the bowling of Karn Sharma. The following match he scored 46 off 20 (Strike rate 230) Rashid Khan got him out. He scored his first fifty against RCB on May 18. Rachin scored a total of 222 runs in the 10 matches he played for CSK.

Ahead of IPL 2026, Rachin was acquired by Kolkata Knight Riders, having played for Chennai Super Kings in IPL 2025. However, he did not feature in any matches for KKR.

== Honours ==
- ICC Men's Emerging Cricketer of the Year: 2023
- ICC Men’s Player of the Month: October 2023
- ICC Champions Trophy: Player of the Tournament: 2025
