= Sport in Christchurch =

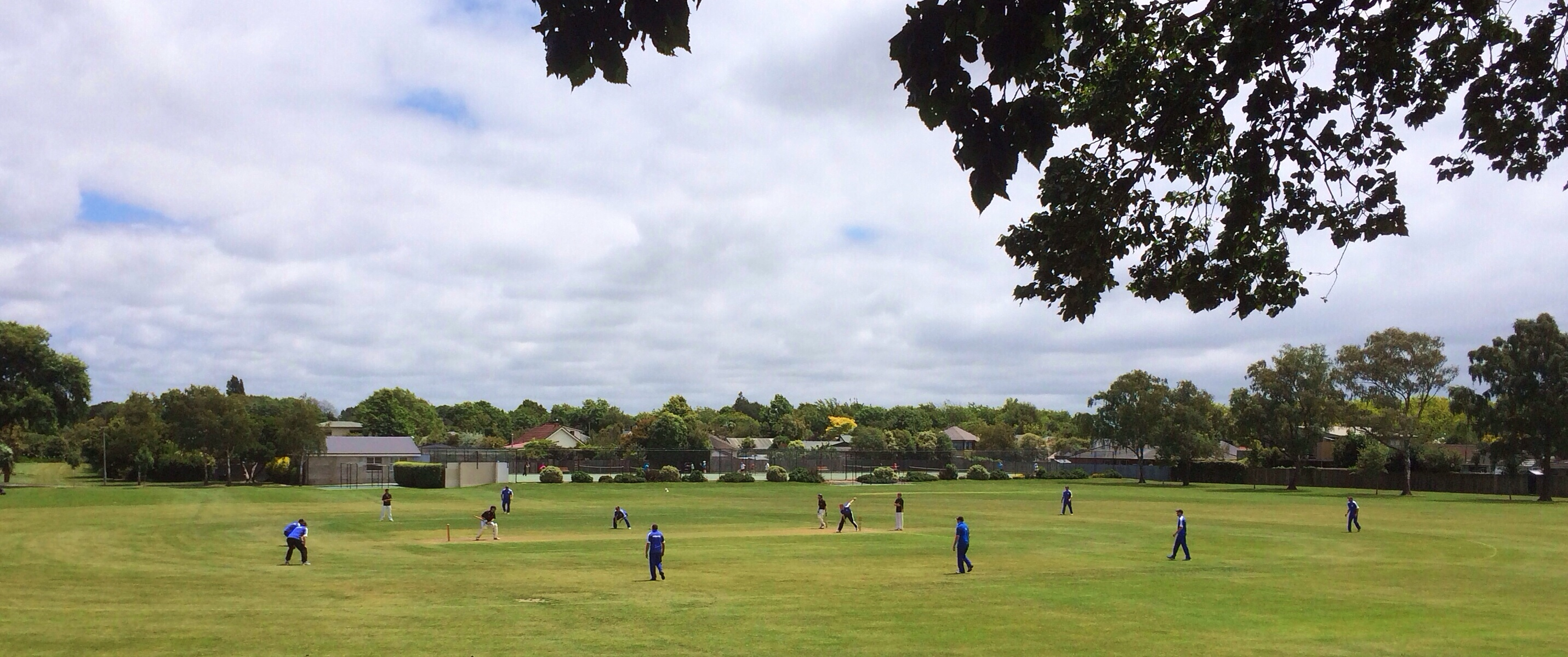
A cricket match in Beckenham Park

Sport in Christchurch has developed from the time of the initial settlement of Canterbury by British migrants, and remains an important part of community life. Cricket and rugby union have been popular team sports since the early years of settlement, with the first cricket club established in the city in 1851, and the first rugby club in 1863. Interest in organised sports has diversified and now includes a wide range of codes. In 2022, the top five sporting codes in Canterbury based on club membership were netball, touch rugby, rugby union, golf and cricket.

There are around 1,200 sports clubs and associations and in 2022, there were 140,000 affiliated members. Most of the sporting codes remain amateur, and rely upon volunteers as administrators and officials. However, there are some professional teams. Notable teams representing Christchurch or the Canterbury region include the Mainland Tactix (netball), Crusaders (rugby) and the Canterbury Kings (cricket).

The city has hosted many international competitions including championship events. A particularly notable international event held in Christchurch was the 1974 Commonwealth Games.

There are many outdoor sportsgrounds and a variety of indoor venues. Christchurch City Council maintains 110 sportsgrounds across Christchurch City and Banks Peninsula. The sports venues Lancaster Park and Queen Elizabeth II Park were damaged beyond repair in the 2011 Christchurch earthquake, and were demolished. New facilities built to replace those damaged in the earthquake include the Ngā Puna Wai Sports Hub, the Parakiore Recreation and Sport Centre — an aquatic and indoor sports venue that opened to the public on 17 December 2025, and a multi–purpose covered stadium Te Kaha seating 30,000 spectators that is expected to be complete by April 2026.

== Organisation and participation ==
Sport in Christchurch is supported by around 1,200 sports clubs and associations. Almost all of these organisations are run by volunteers, although there are now some professional teams.

Surveys carried out by Sport New Zealand indicate that just over one quarter of adults in Canterbury are members of a sport or recreation club (excluding gym or fitness centre memberships). In 2022, the umbrella organisation Sport Canterbury reported in their annual survey results that there were around 140,000 affiliated members of the sporting codes that responded to the survey. Youth aged 12–18 make up 23% of the membership of Canterbury sports clubs. The top five sporting codes in Canterbury based on club membership in 2022 were netball, touch rugby, rugby union, golf and cricket. Although outside the top ten codes, basketball has shown significant growth since 2011, with participation doubling in ten years.

== History ==
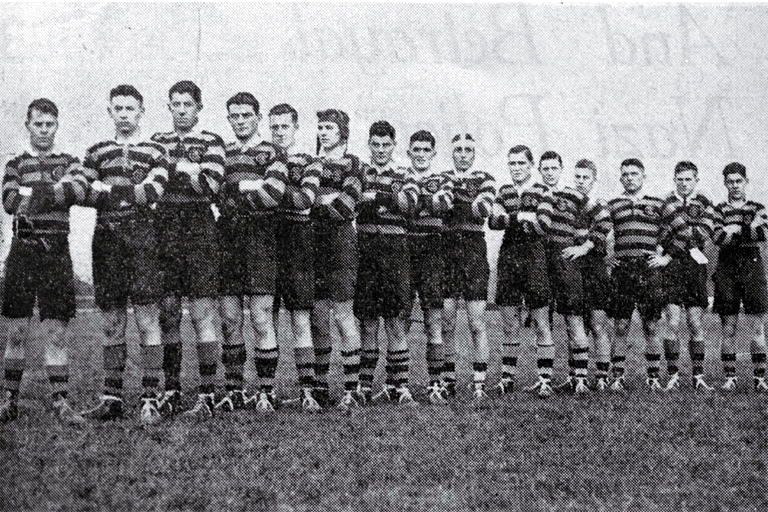
Christ's College Rugby Team (1940)

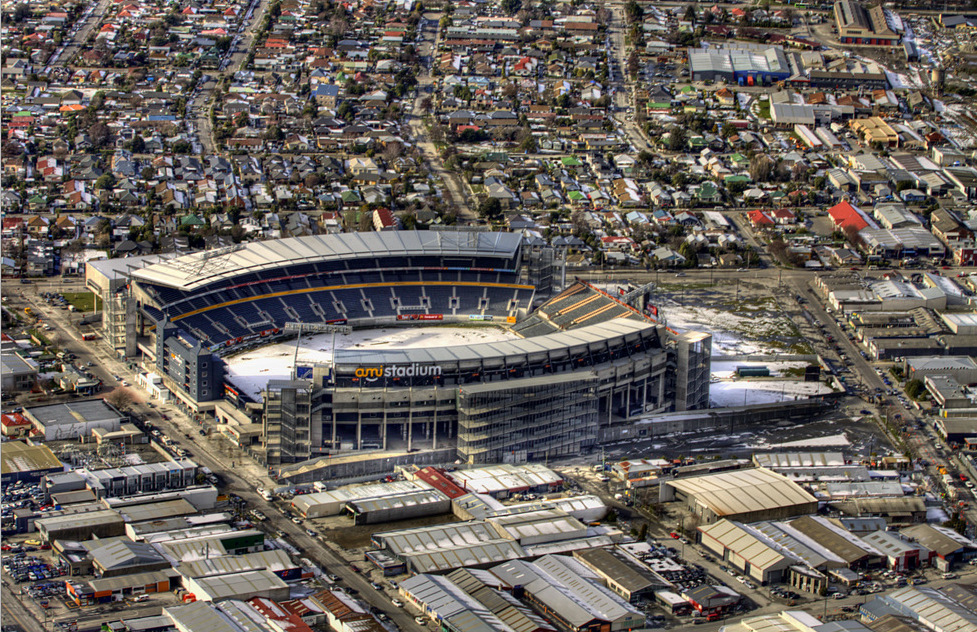
Aerial view of Lancaster Park (2011)

Organised sport was becoming established in Britain at about the same time that British settlers emigrated to New Zealand. In 1851, the anniversary of the founding of the Canterbury settlement was celebrated with an organised sports day in North Hagley Park.

Team and individual sports that were popular in Britain soon became established in Christchurch. A cricket club was formed in June 1851, and cricket was included in the sports day celebration later that year. The cricket oval in South Hagley Park was established by the 1860s. A cricket umpires' pavilion built in 1864 was moved to the oval in 1866 and is recognised as the oldest cricket pavilion in New Zealand. It is listed as a Category 2 Historic Place by Heritage New Zealand.

A form of rugby football was played as early as the 1850s by pupils of Christ's College. The Christchurch Football Club, an amateur rugby union club, was founded in 1863, and is believed to be the oldest rugby club in New Zealand. The Canterbury Rugby Football Union was formed in 1879. Lancaster Park was opened in 1881, and was a major focus of organised sports in the city for 130 years until the stadium and grounds were damaged beyond repair in the 2011 Christchurch earthquake.

The New Zealand Cup is a race for thoroughbred horses that has been held annually at Riccarton Racecourse since 1867. The race was known as the Canterbury Jockey Club Handicap until 1882. The New Zealand Trotting Cup for standardbred horses has been held annually at Addington Raceway since 1904.

Tennis became an established sport from 1881 when a lawn tennis club was formed with courts in Cramner Square. Tennis courts were built across the city, including in Hagley Park and at Lancaster Park, where a Davis Cup match was held in 1911.

New Zealand’s first inter-provincial association football match was played in Christchurch in 1890. The match was between Canterbury and Otago and was hosted at Lancaster Park, drawing a crowd of 5,000. Later in the year, the first inter-islander match was played, between Canterbury and Wellington with Canterbury winning 2–0. The first local association league was played between the Canterbury Association Football Club, Christ’s College and local rugby teams, with the first game in April 1882.

New Zealand’s first women's inter-provincial association football match was played in Christchurch in 1921. The match was between Canterbury and Wellington, with Canterbury winning 1–0.

From the 1920s, further venues were established for specific sporting codes, including English Park (association football), Rugby Park (rugby), Wilding Park (tennis), Porritt Park (hockey) and Denton Park (track cycling). Public parks became increasingly used as venues for team sports, including children's sport.

Netball in Christchurch began as "women's basketball", a nine–a–side game introduced to New Zealand in 1906, and played on grass. The first representative match was held in Wellington in 1923, between teams from Wellington and Canterbury. Netball courts were established on a site in South Hagley Park that had originally been granted to the Salvation Army in 1921 for tennis courts. A team representing Canterbury took part in the first national tournament held in Dunedin in 1926. Christchurch hosted the 1929 national tournament.

The 1974 British Commonwealth Games were held in Christchurch from 24 January to 2 February 1974, with the main venue at Queen Elizabeth II Park. The games have been described as the "most important single event in Christchurch's sporting history". Dick Tayler's win in the 10,000m race was described in the early 2000s as "the most memorable television moment in New Zealand sports history".

In 2011, several major sports venues were damaged beyond repair in the 2011 Christchurch earthquake, including Lancaster Park and Queen Elizabeth II Park.

== Teams in national competitions ==
Sport	Gender	Team/Association	Established	National competition	Home venue	Notes
Association football	Mens	South Island United	2025	OFC Professional League	United Sports Centre	Competing in the 2026 inaugural season
Association football	Mens	Cashmere Technical	2012	Chatham Cup; New Zealand National League	Garrick Memorial Park	Competing in the 2027 National League
Association football	Mens	Ferrymead Bays	1972	Chatham Cup; New Zealand National League	Ferrymead Park	
Association football	Womens	Canterbury United Pride	2002	New Zealand Women's National League	English Park	
Basketball	Mens	Canterbury Rams	1982	National Basketball League	Parakiore Recreation and Sport Centre	
Basketball	Womens	Mainland Pouākai	2022	Tauihi Basketball Aotearoa	Parakiore Recreation and Sport Centre	
Cricket	Mens	Canterbury Kings	1877	Plunket Shield; Ford Trophy; Super Smash	Hagley Oval	
Cricket	Womens	Canterbury Magicians	1932	Hallyburton Johnstone Shield; Super Smash	Hagley Oval	
Field hockey	Mens & Women's	Southern Alpiners	2020	Premier Hockey League	Ngā Puna Wai Sports Hub	
Ice hockey	Mens	Canterbury Red Devils	2005	New Zealand Ice Hockey League	Alpine Ice Sports Centre	
Ice hockey	Womens	Canterbury Inferno	2014	New Zealand Women's Ice Hockey League	Alpine Ice Sports Centre	
Netball	Womens	Mainland Tactix	2007	ANZ Premiership	Wolfbrook Arena	
Rugby league	Mens	Canterbury Bulls	1912	NZRL National Competition	Ngā Puna Wai Sports Hub	
Rugby union	Mens	Crusaders	1996	Super Rugby	Te Kaha	
Rugby union	Mens	Canterbury Rugby Football Union	1879	National Provincial Championship	Te Kaha	
Rugby union	Womens	Matatū	2022	Super Rugby Aupiki	Te Kaha	

=== Association football ===
Men's association football clubs that play in a regional qualifying league for the New Zealand National League in the South Island, Women's association football clubs that play in a South Island league.

League	Clubs	Established	Home venue	Notes
Chatham Cup; Southern League	Cashmere Technical	2012	Garrick Memorial Park	Qualified for 2026 New Zealand National League as Champions; Qualified for 2027 New Zealand National League
Chatham Cup; Southern League	Christchurch United	1970	United Sports Centre	
Chatham Cup; Southern League	Coastal Spirit	2007	Tāne Norton Park	Qualified for 2027 New Zealand National League
Chatham Cup; Southern League	Ferrymead Bays	1972	Ferrymead Park	Qualified for 2026 New Zealand National League as Runners-up
Chatham Cup; Southern League	Nomads United	1910	Tulett Park	
Chatham Cup; Southern League	University of Canterbury	1945	Ilam Fields	
Kate Sheppard Cup; South Island League	Cashmere Technical	2012	Garrick Memorial Park	
Kate Sheppard Cup; South Island League	Coastal Spirit	2007	Tāne Norton Park	
Kate Sheppard Cup; South Island League	NW United	2024	Kendal Park	Combined team of Nomads United and Waimakariri United
Kate Sheppard Cup; South Island League	University of Canterbury	1945	Ilam Fields	

== International championship events hosted ==
- 1974 British Commonwealth Games
- 1977 Rugby League World Cup
- 1981 Pacific Conference Games
- 1982 Women's Cricket World Cup
- 1987 Rugby World Cup
- 1989 XVI World Games for the Deaf
- 1992 Cricket World Cup
- 1999 World Netball Championships
- 2000 Women's Cricket World Cup
- 2004 Men's Softball World Championship
- 2008 World Outdoor Bowls Championship
- 2011 IPC Athletics World Championships
- 2015 Cricket World Cup
- 2016 World Outdoor Bowls Championship
- 2022 Women's Cricket World Cup
- 2022–23 SailGP Championship
- 2023–24 SailGP Championship
- 2026 Christchurch Super440

== Sports venues ==
Hagley Park has remained an important venue for sport in Christchurch from the time of the sports day held in 1851 to celebrate the anniversary of the founding of the city. The park has been described as the birthplace of many sporting codes in Christchurch.

Several major sports venues were damaged beyond repair in the 2011 Christchurch earthquake, including Lancaster Park and Queen Elizabeth II Park. The Ngā Puna Wai Sports Hub was developed on a greenfield site in a reserve in Aidanfield adjacent to the Canterbury Agricultural Park. The new venue replaced international–quality sports facilities lost during the Christchurch earthquakes, including athletics from Queen Elizabeth II Park, rugby league fields from Lancaster Park (AMI Stadium), hockey from Porritt Park, and tennis courts from Wilding Park. The sports hub was developed by the Christchurch City Council with contributions from sporting organisations and philanthropic trusts. The initial commitment was made in March 2015, with the intention of developing the facility in stages over 10—30 years. The athletics track was the first stage of the complex to be opened, with the first meet held in October 2018.

By 1938, there were 38 grass courts being used for netball at South Hagley Park. These courts served as the main venue for netball in the city for around 100 years until the move in 2023 to a new Netsal Sports Centre at the Ngā Puna Wai Sports Hub. The new venue is owned by the Christchurch Netball Centre and has a floor area of 10,000 m^{2} (110,000 sq ft) with 10 courts. The venue can also be used for volleyball, futsal, korfball and gymnastics. Most netball games moved from Hagley Park to the new centre as from winter 2024, and the existing netball centre building at South Hagley Park was sold to the city council.

Further new sports facilities were built as part of the reconstruction following the earthquake, including the Parakiore Recreation and Sport Centre, which opened to the public on 17 December 2025 and is the largest aquatic and indoor sports venue of its kind in New Zealand. The facility includes a 10–lane, 50 m competition pool with seating for 1000 spectators, a competition diving pool, five hydroslides and several indoor courts for codes including netball and basketball. The main court has retractable seating for 2,500. Another major new sports facility is a multi-purpose covered stadium Te Kaha seating 30,000 spectators that is expected to be complete by April 2026.

Most of the sportsgrounds in the city are owned and maintained by Christchurch City Council. As of 2024, the council maintains 110 sportsgrounds across Christchurch City and Banks Peninsula. A Sportsfield Network Plan was adopted by the council in 2024 to upgrade sports fields over the following 10 years. The plan responds to the poor state of many sportsgrounds, with 30% having to be closed during winter 2023 because of wet weather, and more than half of fields assessed as below average or poor quality.

=== List of major venues ===
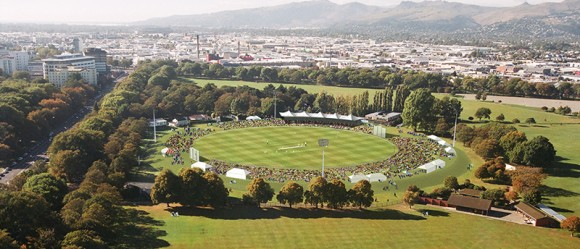
Aerial view of Hagley Oval cricket ground: North is the Botanic Gardens end, East is the historic Umpires' Pavilion side, South is the Port Hills end and West is the Christ's College cricket ground end.

Name	Established	Capacity	Sports	Notes
Addington Raceway	1899		Harness racing	
Alpine Ice Sports Centre	1985		Ice sports	
Apollo Projects Stadium	2011	18,600	Rugby Union, Rugby League, Football	Temporary venue built after Chch earthquake
Cowles Stadium	1961	1,000	Basketball, Netball, Volleyball	
Denton Park	1959		Track cycling	Established 1959. Rebuilt for 1974 Commonwealth Games.
English Park	1915	3,000	Association football	Artificial football turf
Euromarque Motorsport Park	1963		Motor racing	
Hagley Oval	1866	20,000	Cricket	
Hagley Park	1856		Cricket, Rugby union, Touch rugby, Football, American football, Gaelic football	
Kerr's Reach	1913		Rowing, canoeing	River course widened 1949-1950
Netsal Sports Centre (Ngā Puna Wai Sports Hub)	2023		Netball, Volleyball, Futsal, Korfball, Gymnastics	
Ngā Puna Wai Sports Hub	2019		Athletics, Hockey, Rugby League, Tennis	
Parakiore Recreation and Sport Centre		1,000 (pool spectators); 2,500 (main indoor court)	Swimming, Diving, Netball, Basketball	Under construction, due for completion in 2025
Riccarton Park Racecourse	1858		Thoroughbred racing	
Ruapuna Speedway	1962		Motor racing	Dirt racing track adjacent but unrelated to Euromarque Motorsport Park
Te Kaha		30,000	Multi-use	Under construction, scheduled to open April 2026. To be known as One New Zealand Stadium for sponsorship reasons.
United Sports Centre	2014	1,000	Association football	Formerly Christchurch Football Centre
Wilding Park	1920s		Tennis	
Wolfbrook Arena	1998	7,200	Netball, Basketball	

=== Golf courses ===
Christchurch has more than a dozen golf courses within 12 km (7.5 mi) of the city centre, and has hosted the PGA Tour of Australasia/Nationwide Tour co-sanctioned Clearwater Classic/NZ PGA Championship at Clearwater Resort since 2002.

=== Former venues ===
- Lancaster Park (also known as Jade Stadium & AMI Stadium) was Christchurch's premier outdoor sporting ground. It hosted rugby union in the winter months and cricket in the summer months, and was home to the Crusaders Super Rugby and Canterbury Air New Zealand Cup rugby teams. Lancaster Park was also used by the New Zealand national cricket team and occasionally hosted a New Zealand Warriors rugby league match. It had a capacity of around 40,000 people for sporting fixtures, and around 50,000 for concerts. Damaged during the 2011 February earthquake, the facility was subsequently demolished in 2019 returning it to use as community sports fields.
- Queen Elizabeth II Park was built for the 1974 British Commonwealth Games, hosted in Christchurch. It was used primarily as an athletics venue, but also included a swimming pool complex. It hosted major concerts from bands such as AC/DC and the Red Hot Chili Peppers. The facility was demolished due to damage sustained in the February 2011 earthquake.
- Porritt Park was an international–standard hockey venue adjacent to Kerr's Reach on the Avon River. It was severely damaged in the February 2011 earthquake and repairs were uneconomic.
- Between 1949 and 2000, Wigram Airfield was used as a temporary venue for the annual Lady Wigram Trophy motor racing event. The annual race was relocated to Ruapuna Park (now the Euromarque Motorsport Park).

== See also ==
- Sport in New Zealand

== Sources cited ==
- Wilson, John (2013). Contextual Historical Overview for Christchurch City (PDF) (2nd ed.). Christchurch City Council.
