= Te Kaharoa =

Te Kaharoa (meaning "enduring strength" in Māori) may refer to:

- Te Kaharoa, a wharenui (meeting house) in Raglan, New Zealand for Ngāti Māhanga and Ngāti Tamainupō
- Te Kaharoa, the name denoting the entire facility of Te Kaha (stadium) in Christchurch
- Te Kaharoa, a journal at Auckland University of Technology hosted by the faculty Te Ara Poutama – Māori and Indigenous Development
