= 2027 British & Irish Lions Women's tour to New Zealand =

International women's rugby union tour

- Date: 4 – 25 September 2027
- Coach: Jo Yapp
Opponent
P	W	D	L
New Zealand

Tour chronology
- TBC →

The 2027 British & Irish Lions Women's tour to New Zealand, known for sponsorship reasons as the Howden British & Irish Lions Women's Series, is a planned international women's rugby union tour of New Zealand scheduled for September 2027. It will be the first-ever British & Irish Lions Women's tour.

The British & Irish Lions Women, a team selected from players eligible to represent the women's national teams of England, Ireland, Scotland, and Wales, will play a three-match test series against New Zealand, alongside one game against Black Ferns XV, and one against an Invitational XV.

== Schedule ==
The fixtures for the inaugural women's tour were announced on 21 January 2026. The tour will culminate with a three-match test series between the Lions and New Zealand, and will also feature a game against an Invitational XV and one against the Black Ferns XV. A pre-tour fixture against France held in Cardiff was announced on 14 October 2026.

Date	Home team	Score	Away team	Venue	Details
27 August	British & Irish Lions	v	France	Millennium Stadium, Cardiff	Match details
4 September	Black Ferns XV	v	British & Irish Lions	Okara Park, Whangārei	Match details
11 September	New Zealand	v	British & Irish Lions	Mount Smart Stadium, Auckland	Match details
14 September	Invitational XV	v	British & Irish Lions	Waikato Stadium, Hamilton	Match details
18 September	New Zealand	v	British & Irish Lions	Wellington Regional Stadium, Wellington	Match details
25 September	New Zealand	v	British & Irish Lions	Te Kaha, Christchurch	Match details

== Venues ==
Wellington	Christchurch	Hamilton
Wellington Regional Stadium	Te Kaha	Waikato Stadium
Capacity: 34,500	Capacity: 25,000	Capacity: 25,000
Auckland	2027 British & Irish Lions Women's tour to New Zealand is located in New Zealand	Whangārei
Mount Smart Stadium	2027 British & Irish Lions Women's tour to New Zealand is located in New Zealand	Okara Park
Capacity: 24,500	2027 British & Irish Lions Women's tour to New Zealand is located in New Zealand	Capacity: 18,500

== Squads ==
=== British & Irish Lions Women ===
==== Management and staff ====
On 27 May 2026, Jo Yapp was appointed as head coach of the first-ever British & Irish Lions Women's Team. Yapp will take a sabbatical from her role as Head of Women's Pathway at England Rugby to lead the tour, working part-time with the Lions from July 2026 before taking on the role in a full-time capacity from January 2027. Yapp represented England at three Women's Rugby World Cups during her playing career before transitioning into coaching. She been head coach of England U20s Women, Worcester Warriors Women, the Women's Barbarians, and most recently Australia.

Management
Role	Name	
Chair of The British & Irish Lions	TBC	
Chair of the Lions Women's Committee	(England) Carol Isherwood	
Chief Executive	(England) Ben Calveley	
Coaches
Role	Name	Union / Club
Head Coach	(England) Jo Yapp	England
Performance Staff
Role	Name	Union / Club
General Manager of High Performance	Charlie Hayter	England
Head of Athletic Performance	Josie Symonds	Scotland
Operations Staff
Role	Name	Union / Club
Head of Operations	Eimear Flannery	Ireland

== Matches ==
=== British & Irish Lions v France ===
27 August 2027
19:30 BST (UTC+1)

British & Irish Lions	v	France

Millennium Stadium, Cardiff

=== Black Ferns XV v British & Irish Lions ===
4 September 2027
TBC NZST (UTC+12)

Black Ferns XV	v	British & Irish Lions

Okara Park, Whangārei

=== New Zealand v British & Irish Lions (first test) ===
11 September 2027
TBC NZST (UTC+12)

New Zealand	v	British & Irish Lions

Mount Smart Stadium, Auckland

=== Invitational XV v British & Irish Lions ===
14 September 2027
TBC NZST (UTC+12)

Invitational XV	v	British & Irish Lions

Waikato Stadium, Hamilton

=== New Zealand v British & Irish Lions (second test) ===
18 September 2027
TBC NZST (UTC+12)

New Zealand	v	British & Irish Lions

Wellington Regional Stadium, Wellington

=== New Zealand v British & Irish Lions (third test) ===
25 September 2027
TBC NZST (UTC+12)

New Zealand	v	British & Irish Lions

Te Kaha, Christchurch
