= Parakiore Recreation and Sport Centre =

Sport facility in Christchurch, New Zealand

- Interactive map of Parakiore Recreation and Sport Centre
- Former names: Metro Sports Facility
- Address: Christchurch; New Zealand
- Coordinates: 43.5375°S 172.6267°E
- Operator: Christchurch City Council

Construction
- Groundbreaking: 2018
- Built: 2019–2025
- Opened: 2025
- Architects: Warren and Mahoney, Peddle Thorp, MacLennan Jaunkalns Miller
- General contractor: CPB Contractors Limited

Website
- https://ccc.govt.nz/rec-and-sport/projects/parakiore

Parakiore Recreation and Sport Centre, formerly known as the Metro Sports Facility, is a sports facility in Christchurch Central City, New Zealand, that began construction in 2018 and finished in late 2025. It was announced in 2012 as part of the Christchurch Central Recovery Plan, which was a plan to recover the central city after the devastating 2010 Canterbury and 2011 Christchurch earthquakes occurred.

== Design ==
The facility is 32,000 square metres (340,000 sq ft). It has a 10-lane 50-metre-long competition pool with space for 1,000 people to watch. It has the first 50-metre pool in Christchurch since the Queen Elizabeth II Park stadium was demolished after the earthquakes. The pool itself is actually 51.5 metres, but includes a 1.5-metre-long bulkhead that can be moved to change the size of the pool, and also split the pool into two 25-metre pools. The facility also includes a diving pool, five hydroslides and seats for 2,500 people, a pool for learning how to swim, a room for birthday parties, a gym, a café, a sauna, approximately 550 parking spaces and three courts.

The hydroslides were designed to have a similar appearance to eels in an eel pot. They are made of fibreglass and have heights that range from 9 to 12 metres. One of the slides, named the Looping Rocket, has a trapdoor, which was reported in 2019 to be the first trapdoor waterslide in New Zealand. People stand on it and then it opens and drops people down the slide at 40 kilometres per hour. There it also a 125-metre slide named the Sphere Slide, which people use rafts to go down and has a big ball which causes riders to spin around as they go into it, and riders go down the rest of the slide.

It has an "aquatic sensory experience" designed for people with disabilities. It includes a pool with a gradual slope so that people can enter it similarly to how they would at a beach, as well as water features and a tactile wall to provide sensory stimulation.

== Construction ==
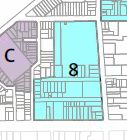
The facility on the Christchurch Central Recovery Plan

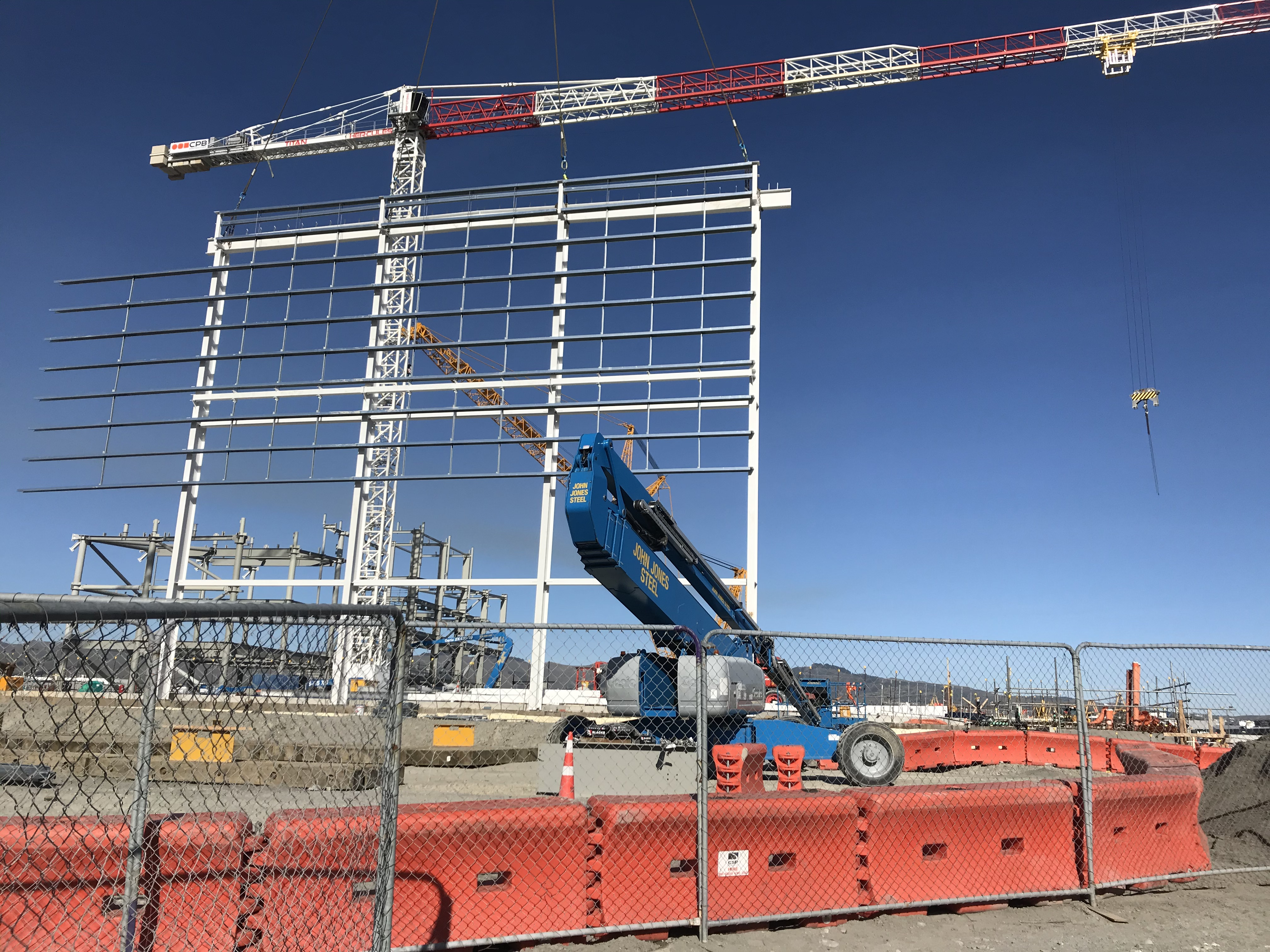
Construction in August 2020

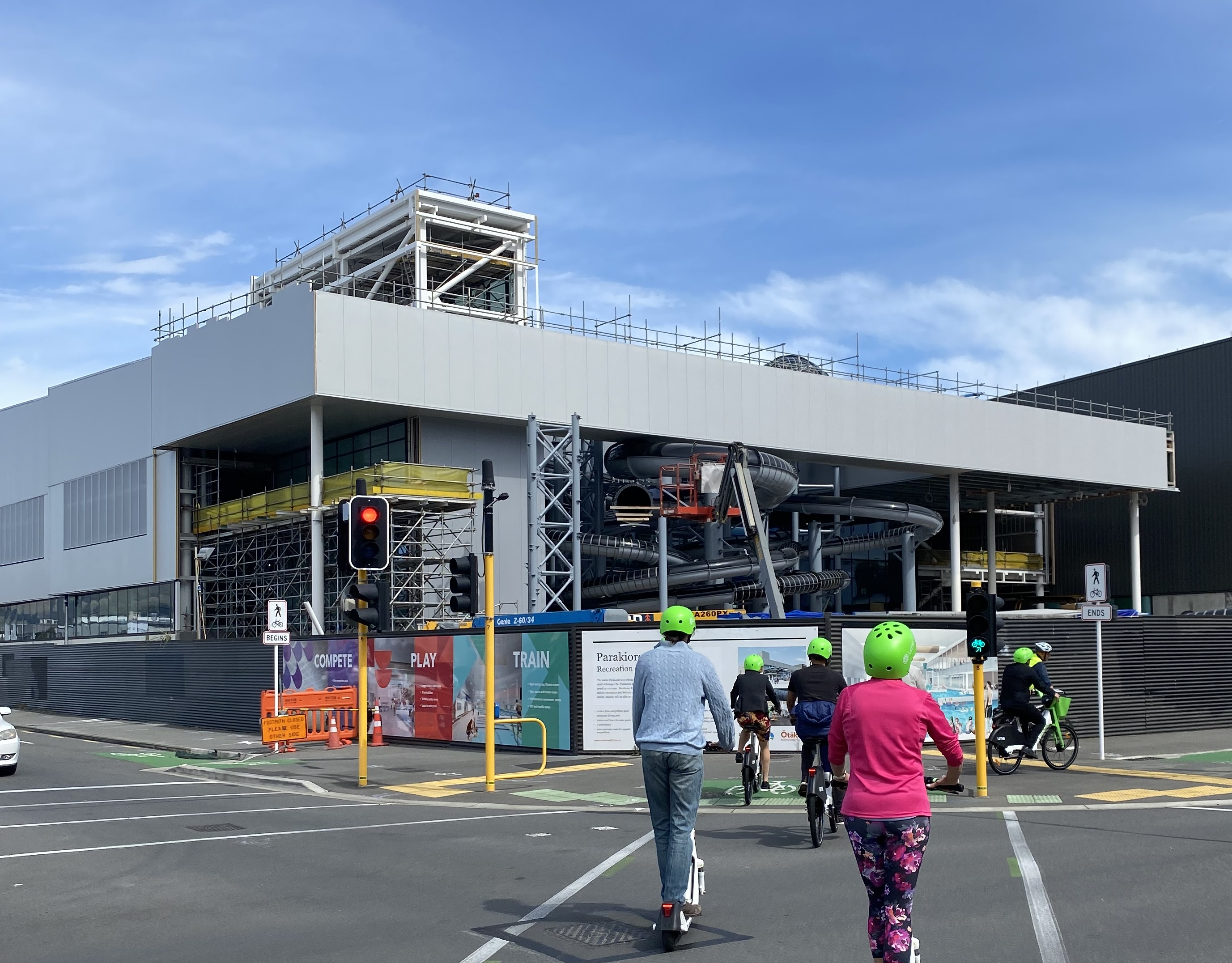
The sport centre in September 2022, with the hydroslides visible on the centre-right

The centre, originally named the Metro Sports Facility, was announced in 2012 as part of the Christchurch Central Recovery Plan, which was a plan to recover the Christchurch Central City after the devastating 2010 Canterbury and 2011 Christchurch earthquakes occurred. The indicative project delivery schedule published in the Christchurch Central Recovery Plan published in mid-2012 aimed for completion in the first quarter of 2016. In the publication Anchor Projects Overview published by CERA in June 2014, the completion date had been revised to end of 2017. This was further revised to 2021. The build is being managed the Crown-owned rebuild company Ōtākaro Limited, and is being built by the Australian company CPB Contractors. The Christchurch City Council will own and operate it, and will allocate a maximum of $148 million for the build.

After Ōtākaro and the Australian company CPB contractors, who was also working on Te Pae Christchurch Convention Centre and a building for Christchurch Hospital, went into final negotiations in February 2019, it was decided in May that CPB would build the sport centre. The contract with CPB was worth $221 million and another $80 million had been allocated for the project.

In November 2017, after the costs went $75 million over budget, the deal with the contractor Leighs Cockram Joint Venture—a joint venture between Leighs Construction and Cockram Construction—was cancelled, and Ōtākaro was told to design the rest of the facility.

In April 2018 the government announced a redesign of the facility due to the increased costs. At the time Greater Christchurch Regeneration Minister Megan Woods said that this redesign had decreased the cost by an estimated $50 million. The changes announced were getting rid of a childcare centre and an outdoor sports area, changing materials, decreasing the sizes of windows and skylights, removing a canopy at the south entrance, and reducing the size of a car park but without decreasing the amount of parking spaces. The construction of the facility started with groundwork in August 2018. Roof trusses started being put up in October 2020.

After delays caused by the COVID-19 pandemic, the expected opening date was shifted in November 2021 to early 2023. The pandemic prevented workers from working on the project from late March to late April. When workers came back restrictions caused them to slow down, and the pandemic also caused problems with sourcing materials from abroad. In late 2021 the government allocated another $16 million to the project after the costs increased.

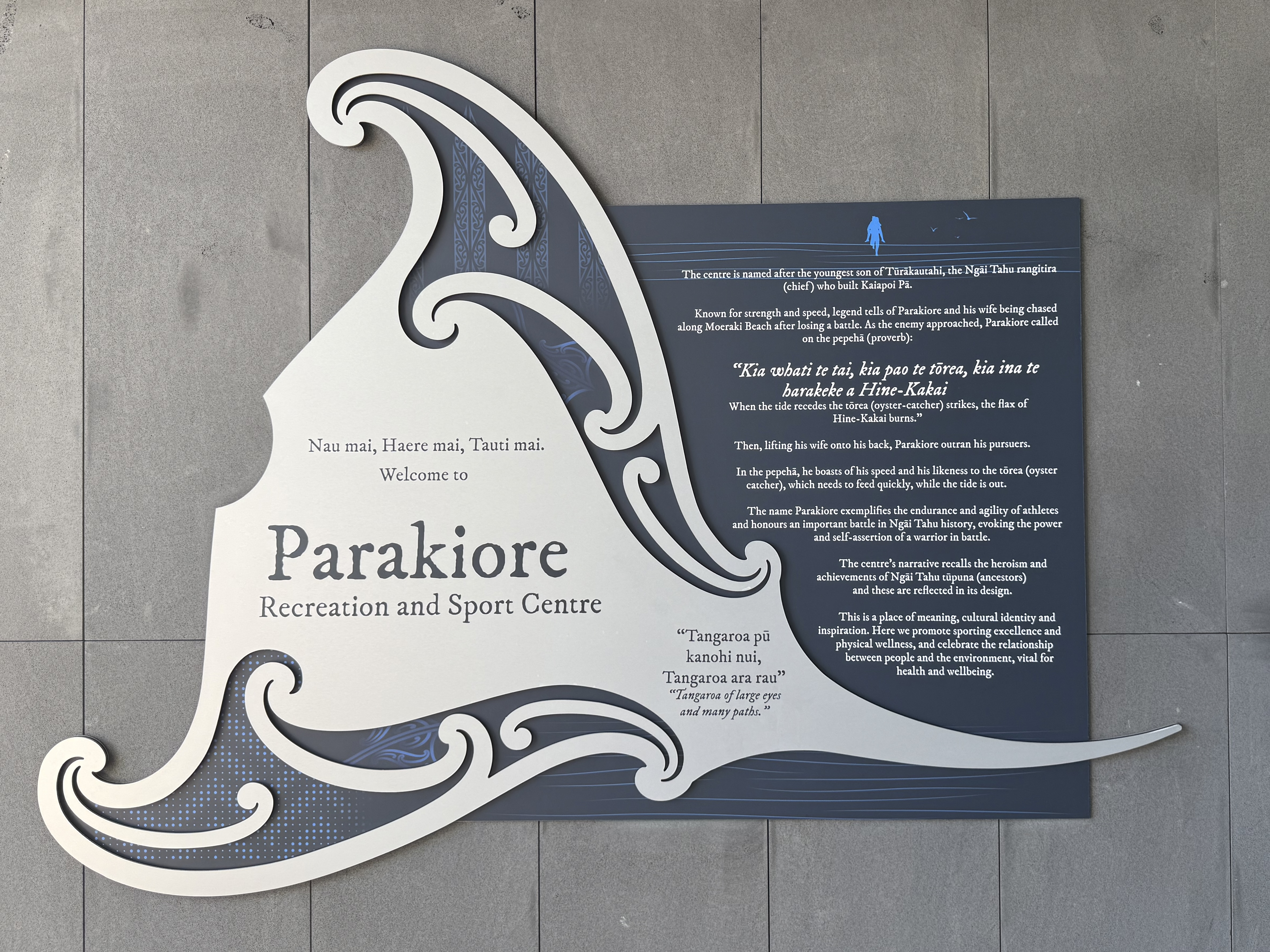
Information board explaining the history and meaning behind the name of Parakiore displayed near the northern entrance.

Until 2021 the centre was known as the Metro Sports Facility. In April 2021 it was renamed to Parakiore Recreation and Sport Centre after Ngāi Tūāhuriri, a hapū of Ngāi Tahu, chose the name Parakiore, in honour of the youngest son of Tūrākautahi, the builder of Kaiapoi Pā. Parakiore had a reputation for strength and speed and is reputed to have outrun an enemy war party near Moeraki Beach while carrying his wife on his back. This name was selected to reflect the centre's intention to promote sporting excellence and physical wellbeing.

In March 2023 it was reported that a dewatering well had removed sand and soil from the ground when it was not supposed to, which caused an area of 10 square metres to sink by an average of 90 centimetres, further delaying the project by what was estimated as five months at the time. There were rumours that the project stopped because of sinking pools, but a spokesperson said that this was false: the pools were not sinking, and the construction did not stop.

In January 2023 CPB Contractors requested another $212 million for the build. However, CPB and Ōtākaro were in a fixed-price contract and Ōtākaro did not agree to the give the extra money. As a result, CPB initiated legal proceedings in order to either "suspend or terminate" the contract at the High Court, but the court ruled against it. In April 2023 the sub-contractor Benmax went into liquidation.

On 17 December 2025, Parakiore opened to the public.

== See also ==
- Sport in Christchurch
- Te Kaha (stadium) – Arena in Christchurch, New Zealand
- Ngā Puna Wai Sports Hub – Sports complex in Christchurch, New Zealand
