= Ngā Puna Wai Sports Hub =

Sports complex in Christchurch, New Zealand

- Interactive map of Ngā Puna Wai Sports Hub
- Full name: Ngā Puna Wai Sports Hub
- Location: Aidanfield, Christchurch
- Coordinates: 43.558°S 172.5755°E
- Owner: Christchurch City Council

Construction
- Opened: 8 March 2019

Website
- Ngā Puna Wai

Ngā Puna Wai Sports Hub is a multi-sports complex located in the suburb of Aidanfield in the city of Christchurch, in New Zealand's South Island. The complex contains international standard sports facilities and was developed using a partnership between Christchurch City Council and regional sports organisations. Ngā Puna Wai Sports Hub was officially opened on 8 March 2019.

== Toponymy ==
The name Ngā Puna Wai means "many spring waters", referring to the artesian springs and streams in the area.

== History ==
The Ngā Puna Wai Sports Hub was developed on a greenfield site in a reserve in Aidanfield adjacent to the Canterbury Agricultural Park. The new venue replaced international–quality sports facilities lost during the 2011 Christchurch earthquake, including athletics facilities at Queen Elizabeth II Park, rugby league fields at Lancaster Park (AMI Stadium), hockey pitches at Porritt Park, and tennis courts damaged at Wilding Park. The sports hub was developed by the Christchurch City Council in collaboration with regional sporting organisations and philanthropic trusts. Sports organisations that participated in the development included Sport Canterbury, Canterbury Hockey, Athletics Canterbury, Tennis Canterbury and Rugby League Canterbury. The initial commitment to the project was made by the Christchurch City Council in March 2015, with the intention of developing the facility in stages over 10—30 years. The athletics track was the first stage of the complex to be opened, with the first track meet held in October 2018.

The formal opening of Ngā Puna Wai Sports Hub was held on 8 March 2019.

== Facilities ==
The sports hub includes international standard facilities for track and field athletics, hockey, rugby league and tennis. It also has multi-purpose grass fields for community activities.

=== Track and field athletics ===
The athletics track is nine lanes, with an additional tenth lane in the front and rear straits. Construction of the track was completed in July 2018. The arena includes facilities for long jump and triple jump, a steeplechase water jump that is inside the main track, plus event stations for high jump, and the throwing events hammer, discus, shot put and javelin. A grandstand provides covered seating for up to 300 spectators, and a three-storey athletics event control building houses the photo-finish facilities. The first track and field meet at the new venue was held in October 2018.

As at July 2023, Ngā Puna Wai is accredited as a Class 1 certified facility by World Athletics. The new facility was used to host the Athletics New Zealand National Track and Field Championships in 2019 and 2020.

=== Hockey ===
There are 2 hockey pitches that meet the category 2 standard set by the International Hockey Federation for international and top-level national competitions. There is also a grandstand with covered seating for up to 300 spectators. The new artificial turf pitches were opened in December 2018.

=== Rugby league ===
Canterbury Rugby League moved from its previous venue at Christchurch Stadium (formerly Rugby League Park), to new dedicated Rugby League facilities at Ngā Puna Wai in 2019. The new sand-carpet pitches were opened on 23 February 2019. The facility includes covered seating for around 550 spectators.

=== Tennis ===
The sports hub includes 12 outdoor tennis courts meeting the International Tennis Federation class 1 standard. As of 2024, the headquarters of Tennis Canterbury remain at Wilding Park.

=== Netsal Sports Centre ===
The Netsal Sports Centre was opened at the Ngā Puna Wai site in November 2023. This facility is owned by the Christchurch Netball Centre and built on land leased from the Christchurch City Council. It has ten indoor courts and can host indoor sports including netball, korfball, futsal and volleyball and is also a venue for gymnastics.

=== Association football ===
In 2023, the venue hosted three New Zealand National League matches on the main Rugby League field, this is the first time that a national club level football match was hosted at the venue with each match drawing over 600 attendees.

The venue is set to host three more New Zealand National League matches in 2024.

== Awards ==
The Ngā Puna Wai Sports Hub was recognised with the Outstanding Project Award at the Recreation Aotearoa Awards in 2019.

== See also ==
- Sport in Christchurch
