= Te Kaha (stadium) =

Arena in Christchurch, New Zealand

- One New Zealand Stadium

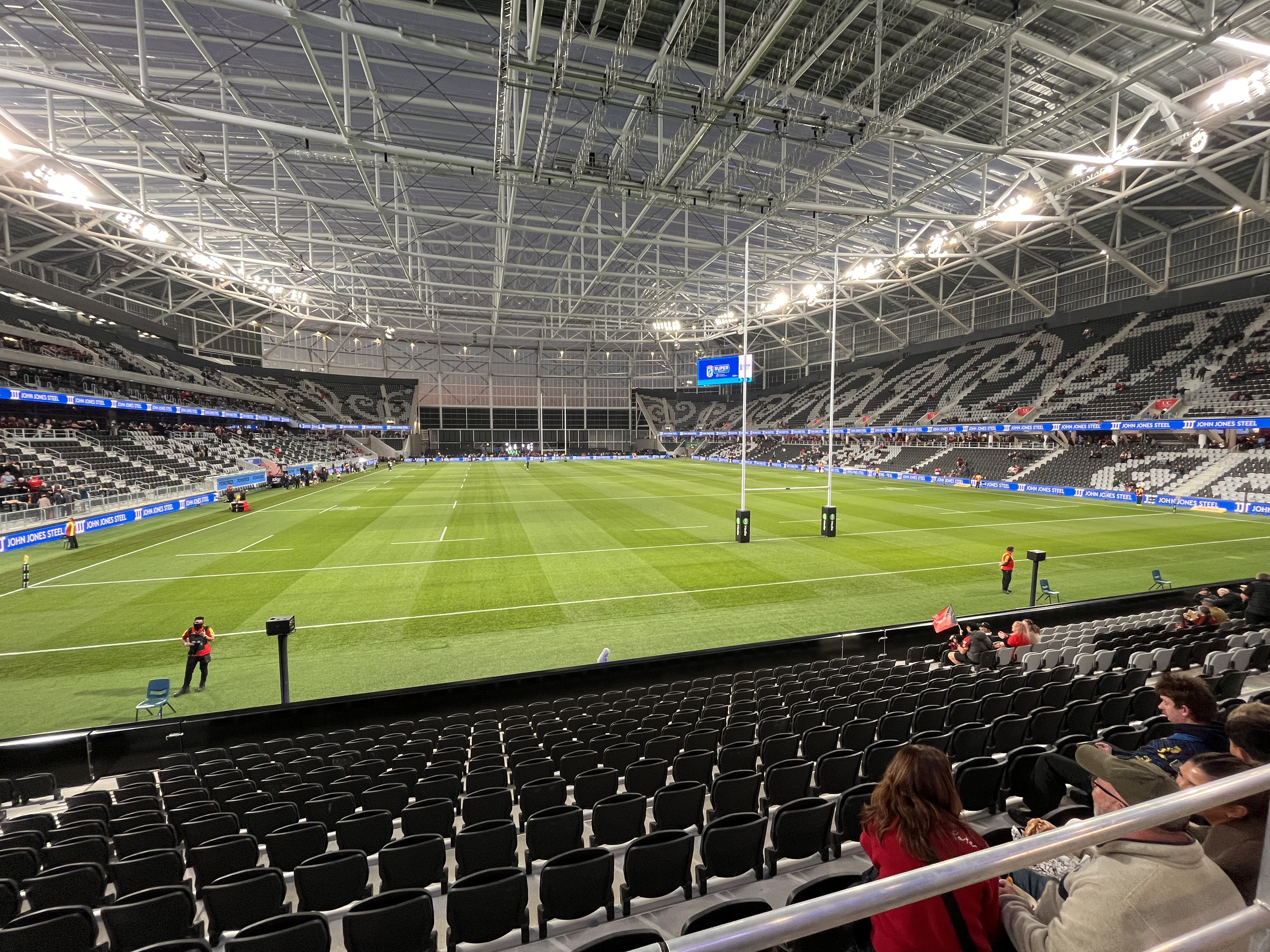
- Interior of the stadium
- Interactive map of Te Kaha
- Full name: One New Zealand Stadium at Te Kaha
- Address: 218 Madras Street; Christchurch; New Zealand
- Location: Christchurch Central City
- Coordinates: 43°32′03″S 172°38′39″E
- Owner: Christchurch City Council
- Operator: Venues Ōtautahi
- Capacity: Sport: 25,000, expandable to 30,000; Concerts: 37,000
- Type: Indoor grass arena
- Surface: Interchangeable
- Record attendance: Sport: 29,152 (New Zealand v France, 4 July 2026); Concert: 37,000 (Six60 & Synthony, 16 May 2026)
- Field shape: Rectangular (interchangeable)

Construction
- Groundbreaking: 8 April 2022; 4 years ago
- Built: 2022–2026
- Opened: 27 March 2026; 7 months ago
- Cost: Estimated around NZD$683 million
- Architects: Populous and Warren and Mahoney
- Builder: Southbase Construction
- Main contractor: BESIX Watpac

Tenants
- Crusaders (Super Rugby) (2026–present); Canterbury (NPC) (2026–present); Matatū (Super Rugby Aupiki) (2026–present)

Website
- onenewzealandstadium.co.nz

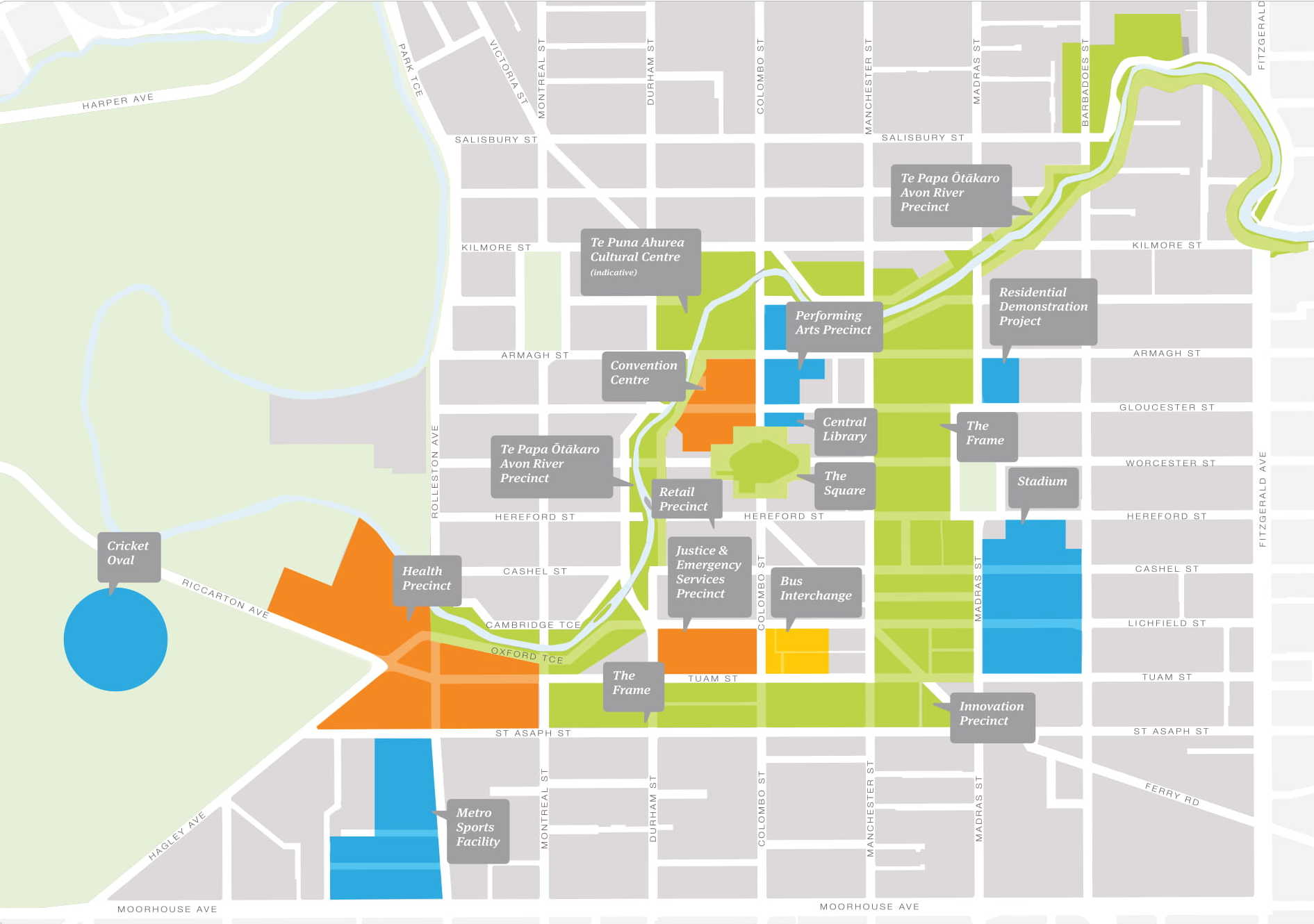
The CCDU Recovery Plan, with the designation for the stadium the large blue area right of centre

The One New Zealand Stadium at Te Kaha, also stylised one.nz stadium and commonly called Te Kaha, is a multi-use sports arena in Christchurch, New Zealand. It is bordered by Hereford, Madras, Tuam, and Barbadoes streets. The facility is a replacement for Lancaster Park, which was damaged in the 2011 Christchurch earthquake and demolished in 2019.

The One NZ Stadium sits on a precinct named Te Kaha [tɛ ˈkɐ.hɐ], meaning "the strength" in Māori and was gifted by Ngāi Tūāhuriri (a local sub-tribe of Ngāi Tahu). The name and the arena's architecture are intended to represent the strength and resilience of Canterbury and its people. The land and stadium precinct are named Te Kaharoa, meaning "enduring strength". The stadium is part of the Christchurch Central Recovery Plan developed by the government in 2012. It was formally opened on 27 March 2026.

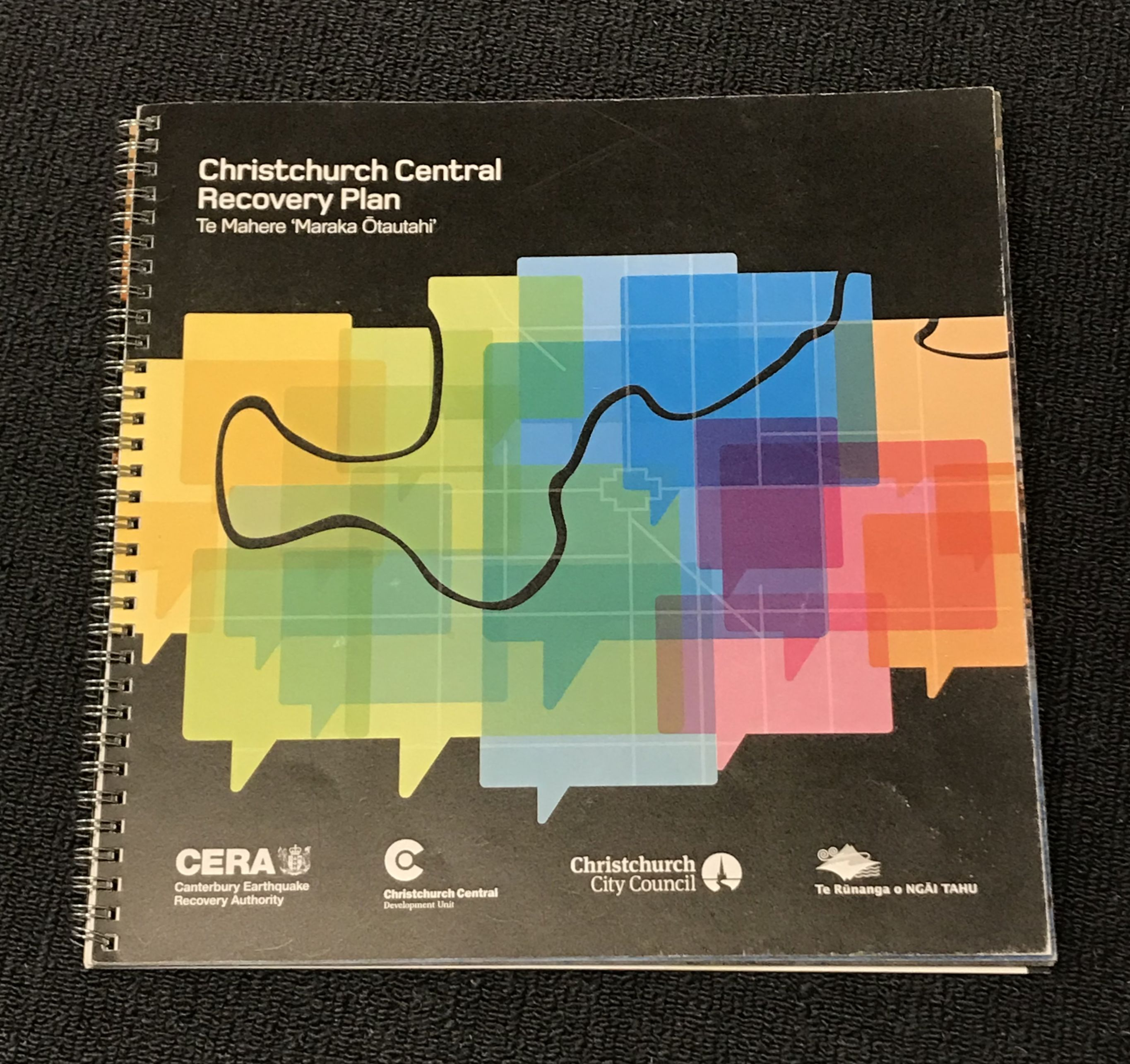
Hardcopy of the July 2012 Christchurch Central Recovery Plan

== Progress ==
After many years of discussion, the city council confirmed a stadium investment case in December 2019 and the cabinet approved its funding contribution in March 2020. Construction was hoped to be complete by late 2024. On 22 July 2021, a majority of Christchurch City Council councillors made a preliminary decision to reduce the capacity to 25,000, but councillors voted on 12 August 2021 to backtrack on that decision after it was revealed the 30,000-seat option would only cost an extra $50 million, rather than the $88 million councillors were originally advised of. As of 2026, the stadium has 25,000 permanent seats with capacity for a further 5000 temporary seats, and has a maximum capacity of 37,000 for concerts.

Construction began in January 2023 and the stadium was opened on 27 March 2026.

== Timeline ==
=== 2012 ===
In July 2012, the Christchurch Central Development Unit released their 100-day blueprint also known as the Christchurch Central Recovery Plan. The plan included a new permanent 35,000-seat multi-purpose sports and entertainment venue as an anchor project within a scheme for a future city vision. The 6-hectare (15-acre) site is bounded by Tuam, Madras, Hereford and Barbadoes Streets. The Government took responsibility for acquiring the land needed for the stadium.

=== 2017 ===
The government Minister supporting Greater Christchurch Regeneration Nicky Wagner and Christchurch City Council published a "Pre-Feasibility Study" for a multi-use arena. This did not consider any options with 35,000 seats, due to the high cost, and the general consensus among stakeholders (except for New Zealand Rugby) was that that capacity was higher than Christchurch needed.

=== 2021 ===
In March 2021, a consortium of businesses were confirmed as the successful tenderer for designing and building the Canterbury Multi-Use Arena. The group known as Kōtui is led by Australian-based stadium construction company BESIX Watpac and also includes the Christchurch-based Southbase Construction and Fulton Hogan, local seismic engineers Lewis Bradford, Christchurch architects Warren and Mahoney, and global stadium design companies Populous and Mott MacDonald.

The land that the stadium sits on was gifted the name Te Kaharoa ("enduring strength" in Māori) by the local hapū (sub-tribe) Ngāi Tūāhuriri in 2021. The city's mayor Lianne Dalziel said that Te Kaharoa reflected Canterbury's "determination and fierce spirit".

=== 2022 ===
The name of the precinct surrounding the stadium Te Kaha (meaning "the strength") was gifted by Ngāi Tūāhuriri; the name Te Kaha replaced the name Canterbury Multi-Use Arena in January 2022.

On 14 July, the Christchurch City Council voted to sign a $683 million contract to build One NZ Stadium. This will require the council to invest an extra $150 million, which they plan to do by increasing rates. The $150m increase in costs in 2022 was blamed by councillors on the combined economic effects of the COVID-19 pandemic, the war in Ukraine and COVID-19 lockdowns in China.

The council received 30,000 submissions about the stadium, with 77% being in favour. Barry Bragg, the Te Kaha project delivery board chairman, said it was a fixed price contract, meaning that there will be no further increases of the cost of the project.

=== 2024 ===
In July, a sponsorship deal gave naming rights for 10 years to the telecommunications company One NZ. The stadium was given the sponsored name One New Zealand Stadium; official sources often accurately refer to it as One New Zealand Stadium.

=== 2026 ===
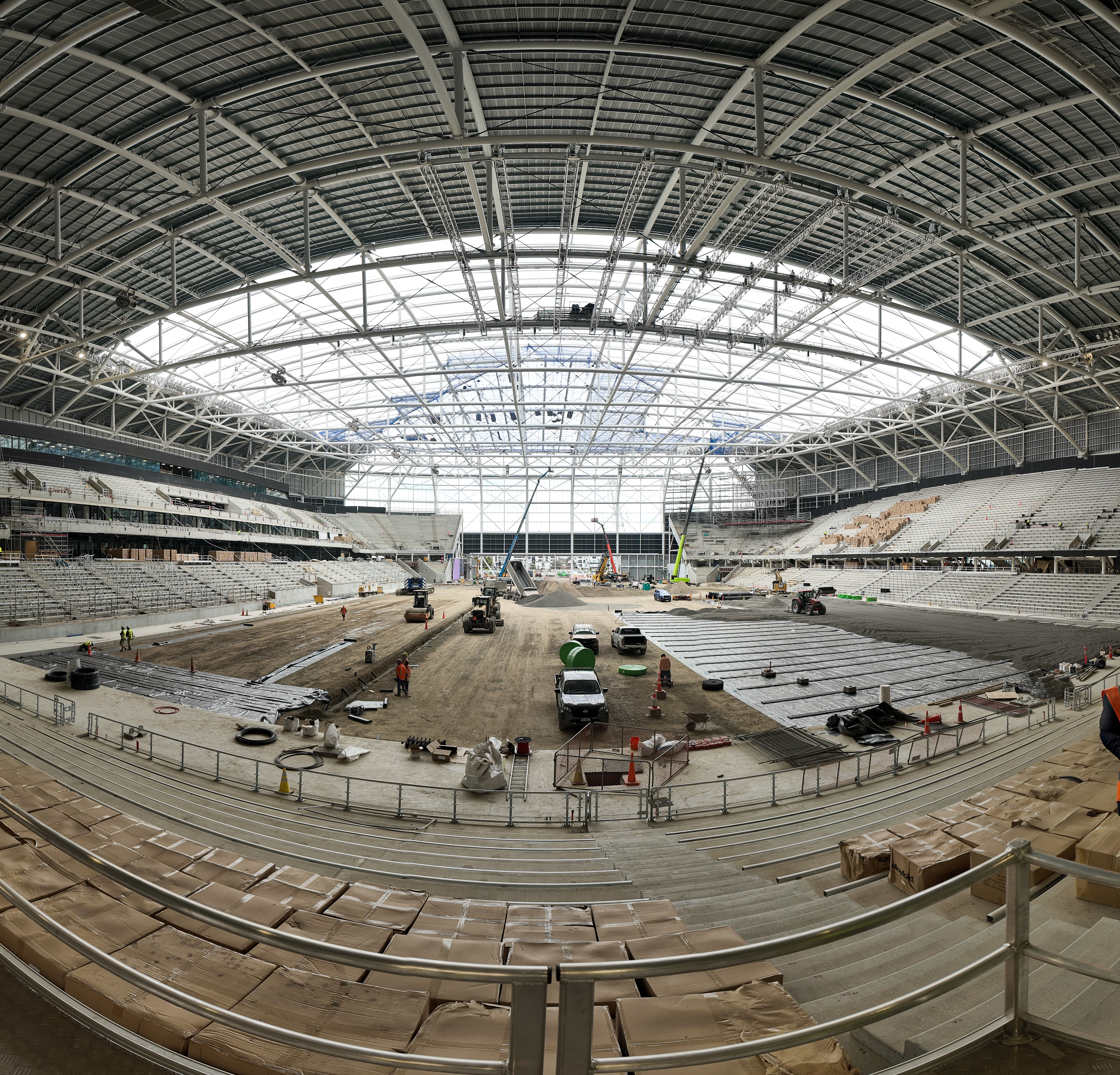
Interior during construction, September 2025

The official council opening event was on 27 March 2026, with the first events scheduled to take place in April 2026.

On 14 November 2025, it was announced that the New Zealand Warriors will continue their deal of playing one NRL match a year in Christchurch. The squad will face the North Queensland Cowboys on 21 June 2026. Tickets sold out in 5 days with an expected crowd of 25,000.

In December 2025, it was announced that the first concert to be held at the stadium would be Once in a Lifetime on 16 May 2026 which would feature full sets from Six60 and Synthony.

On 17 March 2026, it was announced that British singer Robbie Williams would perform at the stadium on 28 November 2026 as part of the Britpop Tour. This is currently scheduled to be the first concert headlined by an international act to be held at the stadium.

The stadium hosted its first major events in April 2026 with five Super Rugby Pacific matches played over ANZAC weekend, as the stadium took on the mantle of hosting Super Round from 2026 onwards. Including all future interest on the $683 million construction contract, that the final bill to ratepayers is estimated to surpass NZ$1,000,000,000.

== Features ==
Te Kaha's design includes elements closely related to Canterbury and to elements of Māori culture. Several features were conceived by the artist Morgan Darlison, appointed by Ngāi Tūāhuriri. The seating bowl has a unique black-and-grey kowhaiwhai design inspired by the hammerhead shark "which represents strength, tenacity, speed and agility". Darlison chose this for its visual impact, and she intended it as "[a] bit of inspiration for our performers and athletes".

The stadium's steel outer façade represents the Canterbury landscape seen around the stadium, including the mountains, waterways, coast and food resources (mahika kai). Warren and Mahoney wrote, "no matter where visitors stand, the façade will mirror the landscape behind it". Other artworks depict the Māori creation story in the version of Ngāi Tahu (the main South Island tribe).

Darilson also created the stadium's feature wallpaper in the west entrance. The hand-painted design was inspired by the story of Tāne and the separation of Ranginui and Papatuanuku, the sky father and earth mother in Māori mythology with a red colour inspired by the Christchurch sunset.

Te Kaha's maximum capacity when hosting concerts will be 37,300.

The stadium has a permanent roof 32 metres above ground level, made from steel and clad with thin ETFE plastic.

== Events ==
=== 2026 Rugby League World Cup ===
In November 2025, the stadium was named as a venue for the 2026 Rugby League World Cup, hosting a sold out double header that saw the New Zealand women's and men's teams defeat France and Cook Islands respectively.

Date	Country	Score	Country	Competition	Attendance
25 October 2026	New Zealand	92–0	France	2026 Women's World Cup	26,800
25 October 2026	New Zealand	82–16	Cook Islands	2026 Men's World Cup	26,800

=== Rugby union ===
In December 2025, it was announced that Te Kaha would play host to the All Blacks' first home game of the new 2026 Nations Championship. It was also announced that the Black Ferns would host their final game of the year in Christchurch. In January 2026, it was announced that the British & Irish Lions Women would play the Black Ferns at the stadium in the final game of the 2027 British & Irish Lions Women's tour to New Zealand.

In addition it will host the Super Round of the Super Rugby season with all 5 games during the round spread over one weekend, as well as all Crusaders home games moving forwards. Super Round will return to the stadium in 2027.

=== Other sports ===
In addition to its regular rugby union fixtures, One New Zealand Stadium has played host to many other sports, including rugby league, motorsports, and football.

The stadium hosted the New Zealand Warriors in a sell-out NRL game of 24,365 in attendance, against the North Queensland Cowboys on 21 June 2026. The game was won by the Warriors, 38–20. Additionally, the All Whites will play at the stadium on 15 November 2026 in a two-match series against India.

The stadium will also have the ability to have a motocross arena, as it was scheduled to host the final round of the FIM Supercross World Championship on 5 December 2026. However, this event was cancelled along with five other rounds when the season was cancelled abruptly on 8 October 2026.

Canterbury Rugby has also used the stadium for their Metro Premier Club Rugby Union finals, with both the women's and men's finals being held at the stadium yearly since 2026.

New Zealand Football will also host the final of the Kate Sheppard Cup and Chatham Cup on the same day, 5 September 2026.

The Wellington Phoenix will bring both their mens and women's teams to the stadium on Waitangi Day, with both teams facing the Western Sydney Wanderers, mens and womens teams respectively.

==== Other sports fixtures ====
Date	Competition	Sport	Team	Score	Team	Attendance
13 June 2026	Super Rugby Aupiki	rugby union	(New Zealand) Matatū	52–26	(New Zealand) Chiefs Manawa	11,793
21 June 2026	NRL	rugby league	New Zealand Warriors	38–20	North Queensland Cowboys	24,365
25 July 2026	Super Rugby Aupiki	rugby union	(New Zealand) Matatū	21–28	(New Zealand) Blues Women	10,067
26 July 2026	Canterbury Metro Premier Women	rugby union	(New Zealand) Linwood Rugby Club	17–13	(New Zealand) Christchurch Football Club	3,500 (Note: Estimate of 3000–4000 in attendance)
26 July 2026	Canterbury Metro Premier Men	rugby union	(New Zealand) Linwood Rugby Club	27–29	(New Zealand) Marist Albion	6,500 (Note: Estimate of 6000–7000 in attendance)
5 September 2026	Kate Sheppard Cup	football	(New Zealand) Cashmere Technical	1–3	(New Zealand) Eastern Suburbs	5,802
5 September 2026	Chatham Cup	football	(New Zealand) Cashmere Technical	1–2	(New Zealand) Fencibles United	11,267
15 November 2026	100 Years of Unity Through Sport (friendly)	football	New Zealand	3–0	India	25,706
6 February 2027	A-League Women	football	(New Zealand) Wellington Phoenix	—	(Australia) Western Sydney Wanderers	
6 February 2027	A-League	football	(New Zealand) Wellington Phoenix	—	(Australia) Western Sydney Wanderers	

==== International rugby union fixtures ====
Date	Country	Score	Country	Competition	Attendance
4 July 2026	New Zealand	34–32	France	2026 Nations Championship	29,152
31 October 2026	New Zealand	–	France	2026 WXV	
25 September 2027	New Zealand	–	British & Irish Lions	2027 British & Irish Lions Women's tour to New Zealand	

==== Super Round ====
Date	Team	Score	Team	Attendance
2026
24 April 2026	(New Zealand) Crusaders	35–20	(Australia) NSW Waratahs	25,237
25 April 2026	(New Zealand) Hurricanes	45–12	(Australia) ACT Brumbies	25,000+ (Note: Tickets sold out but no exact figure provided)
25 April 2026	(New Zealand) Blues	36–33	(Australia) QLD Reds	25,000+
26 April 2026	(New Zealand) Highlanders	27–17	(New Zealand) Moana Pasifika	25,000+
26 April 2026	(New Zealand) Chiefs	42–22	(Fiji) Fijian Drua	25,000+
2027
2 April 2027	(New Zealand) Crusaders	–	(Australia) ACT Brumbies	TBA
3 April 2027	(New Zealand) Chiefs	–	(Australia) Western Force	TBA
3 April 2027	(New Zealand) Blues	–	(Australia) NSW Waratahs	TBA
4 April 2027	(New Zealand) Highlanders	–	(Fiji) Fijian Drua	TBA
4 April 2027	(New Zealand) Hurricanes	–	(Australia) QLD Reds	TBA

=== Concerts ===
Date	Event	Headliners	Support	Attendance
16 May 2026	Once In A Lifetime	Six60, Synthony	Kaylee Bell, Cassie Henderson, Castaway	37,000+
28 November 2026	Britpop Tour	Robbie Williams	Drax Project, The Lottery Winners	TBD
19 January 2027	Take Cover Tour	Foo Fighters	DARTZ, SEEK HELP!	TBD

== See also ==
- Sport in Christchurch
- Parakiore Recreation and Sport Centre
