= Hagley Oval =

New Zealand cricket ground

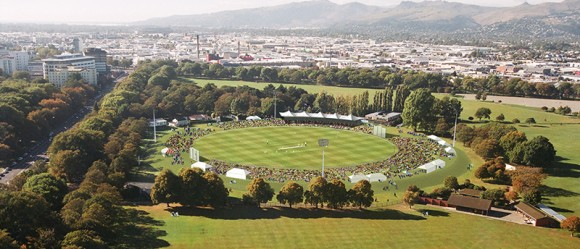
- Aerial view of Hagley Oval looking roughly south-east, toward Hadlee Pavilion. The Botanic Gardens end is to the north (roughly left), east is the historic Umpires' Pavilion side, to the south is the Port Hills end and west is the Christ's College cricket ground.
- Interactive map of Hagley Oval

Ground information
- Location: Christchurch, Canterbury
- Country: New Zealand
- Coordinates: 43.534°S 172.619°E
- Establishment: 1851
- Capacity: 9,000 (500 seated, expandable to 18,000)
- End names
- Port Hills end Botanic Gardens end

International information
- First Test: 26–29 December 2014: New Zealand v Sri Lanka
- Last Test: 02 December – 06 December 2025: New Zealand v West Indies
- First ODI: 23 January 2014: Canada v Scotland
- Last ODI: 16 November 2025: New Zealand v West Indies
- First T20I: 1 November 2019: New Zealand v England
- Last T20I: 20 October 2025: New Zealand v England
- First women's Test: 7–10 March 1969: New Zealand v England
- Last women's Test: 28 February – 3 March 1995: New Zealand v Australia
- First WODI: 23 January 1992: New Zealand v Australia
- Last WODI: 18 December 2023: New Zealand v Pakistan
- First WT20I: 15 November 2015: New Zealand v Sri Lanka
- Last WT20I: 2 December 2022: New Zealand v Bangladesh

Team information
| Canterbury | (1886–present) |
- As of 11 March 2024; Source: Cricinfo

Hagley Oval is a cricket ground in Hagley Park in the central city of Christchurch, New Zealand. The first recorded match on the ground was in 1867, when Canterbury cricket team hosted Otago cricket team. Canterbury used the ground infrequently from then through until the 1920s, but hardly stopped during World War I.

The first match in the Plunket Shield was played there in December 1907, when Canterbury played Auckland. Canterbury returned there in 1979, and played a number of their 1993/94 Shell Cup home matches at the ground.

== History ==
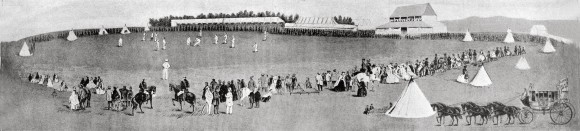
1st match, Canterbury v England, Hagley Park (February 1864)

"Cricket in Canterbury had a natural birth. The settlement in 1850 was a planned reproductions of a piece of England in a strange land 12,000 miles away. It was a church-based design, but the bat went with the bible, for if there was to be another England, there most certainly had to be cricket."

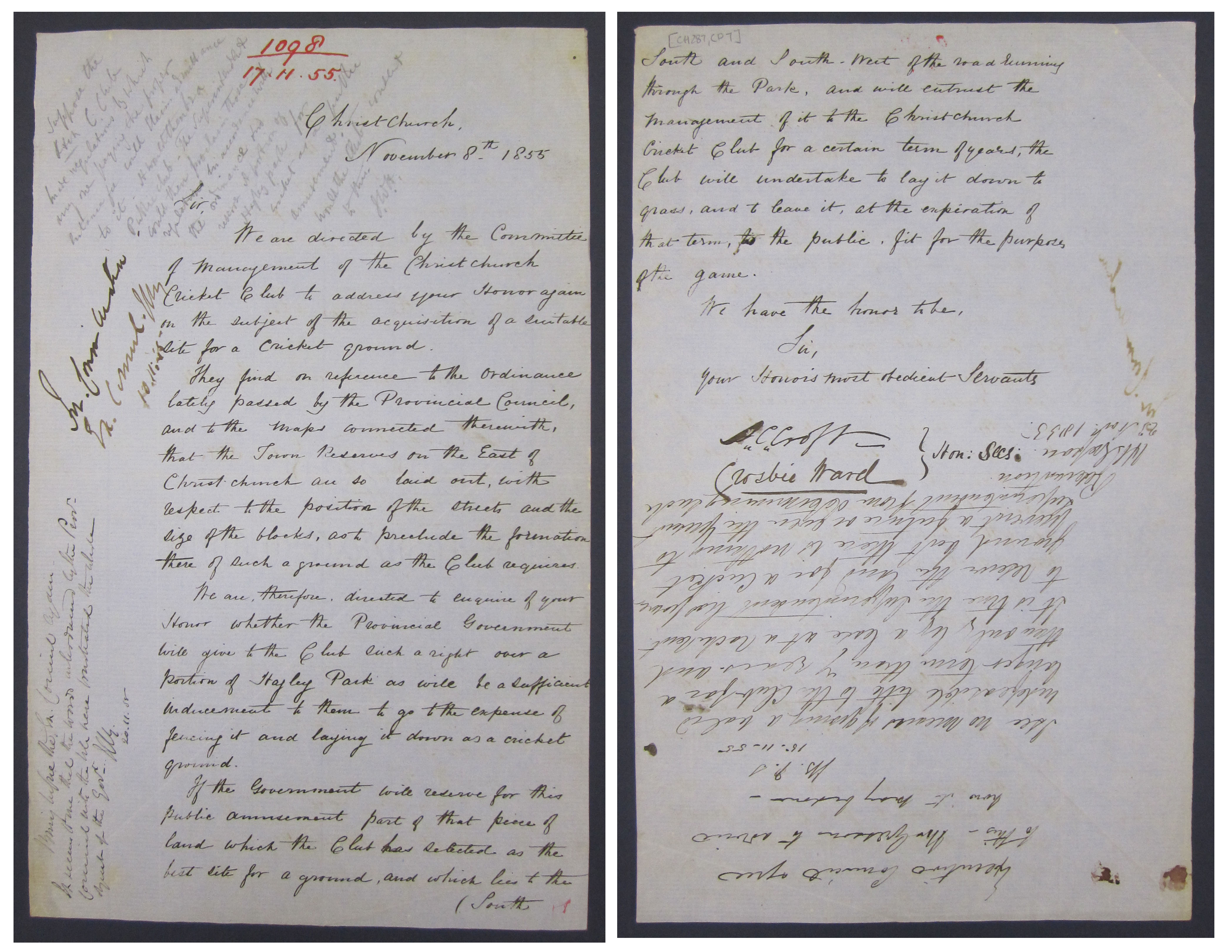
Application for the cricket pitch at Hagley Park, Christchurch, 1855

Hagley Oval's destiny as the historical and spiritual home of cricket in Canterbury was determined in the first days of a new town called Christchurch. Just four months after the arrival of the first four ships, the settlers to Canterbury had formed their very own cricket club. Only months later, as part of Founders' Day celebrations on 16 December 1851, the ensuing game of cricket ensured the roots of cricket in this new town.

Hagley Oval has since been identified and documented as the cornerstone of Canterbury and New Zealand cricketing activity. During the early decades the Oval hosted a series of inter-provincial matches, as well as the occasional international fixtures. It continues to host all grades of cricket, and was one of the host grounds for the ICC 2015 Cricket World Cup.

The Hagley Oval Foundation was established by the Canterbury Cricket Trust and the Canterbury Cricket Association, to raise the funds necessary to fully develop Hagley Oval into an international-standard cricket venue.

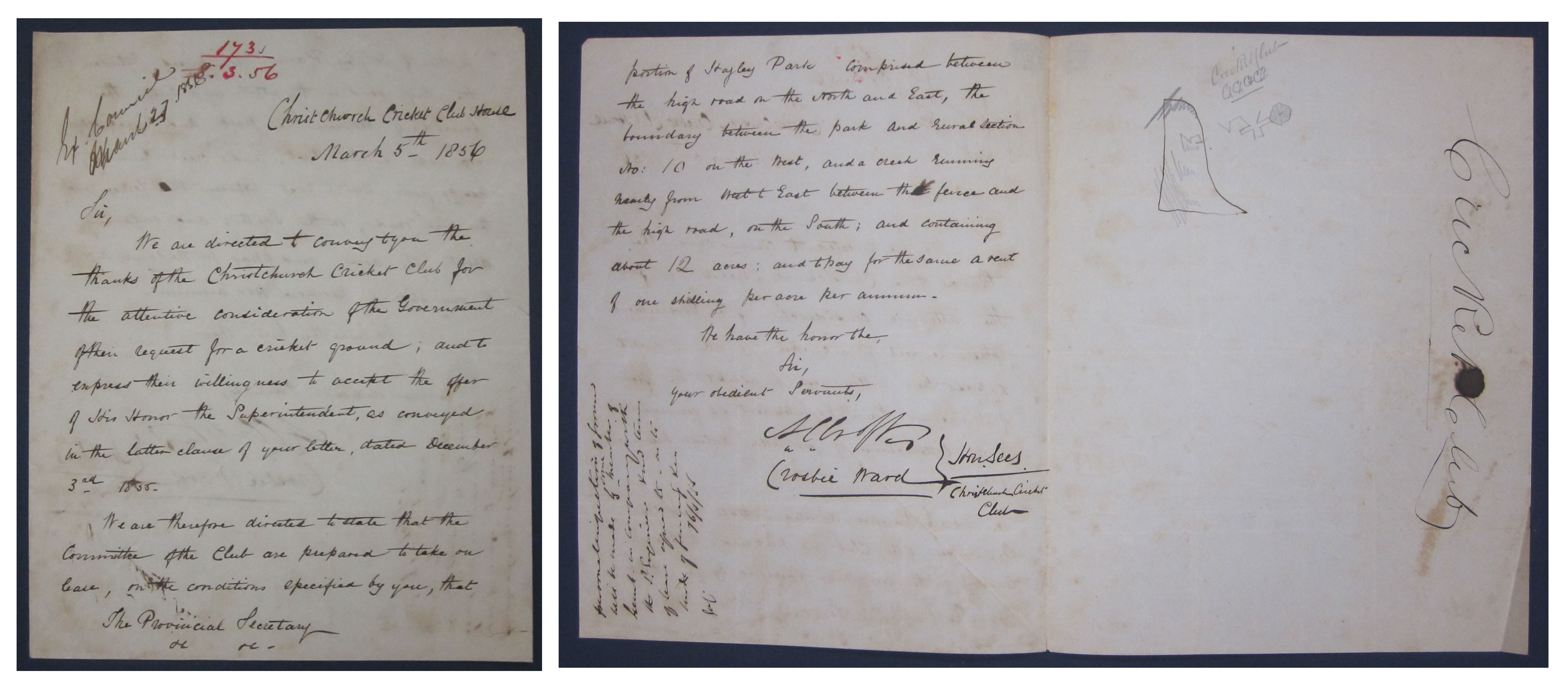
Acceptance of lease of land for Cricket Pitch at Hagley Park, Christchurch (1856)

=== Return to Hagley Oval ===
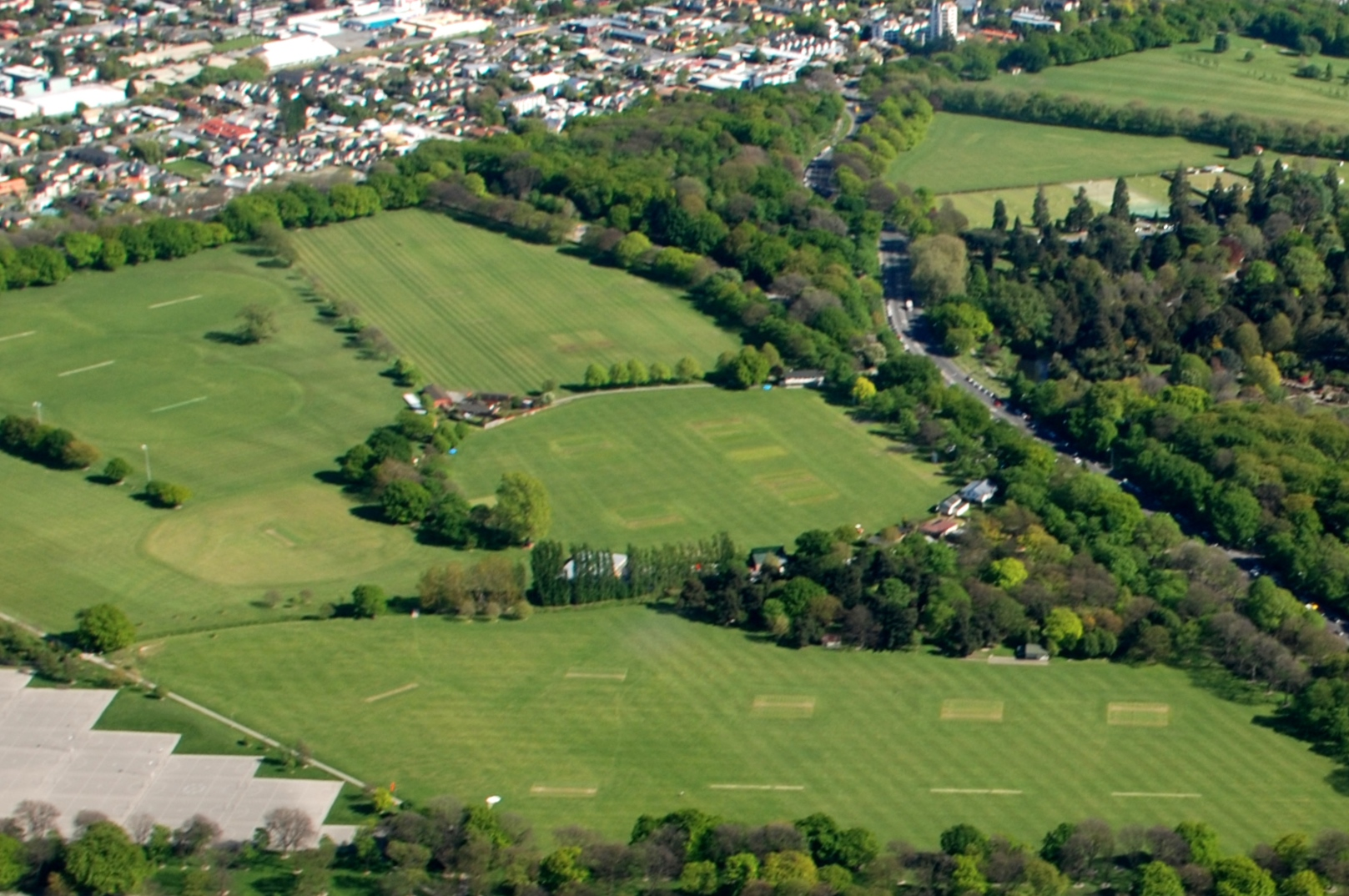
The ground in 2007

Cricket and rugby shared Lancaster Park from post World War I until well into the 1990s. By that stage the extended rugby season was encroaching onto cricket's traditional international window in February and March.

As early as 1998 Canterbury Cricket recognised the need for a purpose-built cricket ground for international and provincial cricket while Rugby would move to Addington Showgrounds a rectangular venue which would be rebuilt and enlarged with a minimum capacity of 18.000 and maximum capacity of 50.000 for test matches. A return to Hagley Oval was investigated and in 2006/7 the Canterbury Cricket Association determined to prioritize it as its preferred venue. The Canterbury Cricket Trust was established and the Hagley Pavilion designs were developed by early 2011. However this was forced by the 2010/11 earthquakes that damaged Lancaster Park.

=== As an international venue ===
The first One Day International at the ground was played between Scotland and Canada during the 2014 Cricket World Cup Qualifier on 23 January 2014. The ground has also hosted three Women's Test matches and six Women's ODIs.

In 2013 the controversial Canterbury Cricket proposal to develop Hagley Oval as an international cricket venue was approved by the Environment Court. During the process of building and renovation of the Oval, it suffered two major floods in 2013.

In 2014, Hagley Oval became the eighth Test venue in New Zealand. The Boxing Day match against Sri Lanka marked New Zealand's first Test in Christchurch since the city was hit by a major earthquake in 2011, but nearly 10 years since Lancaster Park held what became the final match in Christchurch in 2006. Brendon McCullum scored his fastest test hundred in New Zealand's history. He also scored his 1000th test run in the 2014 calendar year, but missed out on his 4th test double century in that calendar year.

Hagley Oval hosted NZ's opening ceremony and match for the 2015 ICC Cricket World Cup, while their final match as host of the World Cup was between England and Scotland on 23 February 2015, which was a day after the 4th anniversary of 2011 Christchurch earthquake.

When the Oval has no matches scheduled, it can still be used as a community park, with youth level, mixed-gender cricket being played on Saturdays. The tent-like pavilion was named after the Hadlee Family when the old Hadlee stand of Lancaster Park being demolished first after the Park become unusable. The pitch is oval but widthways not lengthways, with 11 wickets in the block of which 10 are approved for Tests with full boundaries. This makes it the largest cricket ground in New Zealand. There are no drop-in pitches required. It emulates certain aspects of Lord's and a large and fast outfield of Adelaide Oval, so it slopes down evenly outside the boundaries.

== Resume play ==
The film Resume Play – A new era for cricket in post-earthquake Christchurch tells the story of cricket in Christchurch, how it was affected by the 2011 Christchurch earthquake, and the controversial development of Hagley Oval into an international facility that hosted the opening match of the Cricket World Cup. It was produced by Canterbury Cricket with support from Sport New Zealand, and it features interviews with club cricketers, city leaders, "backyard cricketer" Prime Minister John Key and many of New Zealand's leading players, including Sir Richard Hadlee, Stephen Fleming, and Tom Latham.

== Ground specifications ==
Capacity– Approx. 20,000

Playing dimensions–149m x 149m WICKETS–11

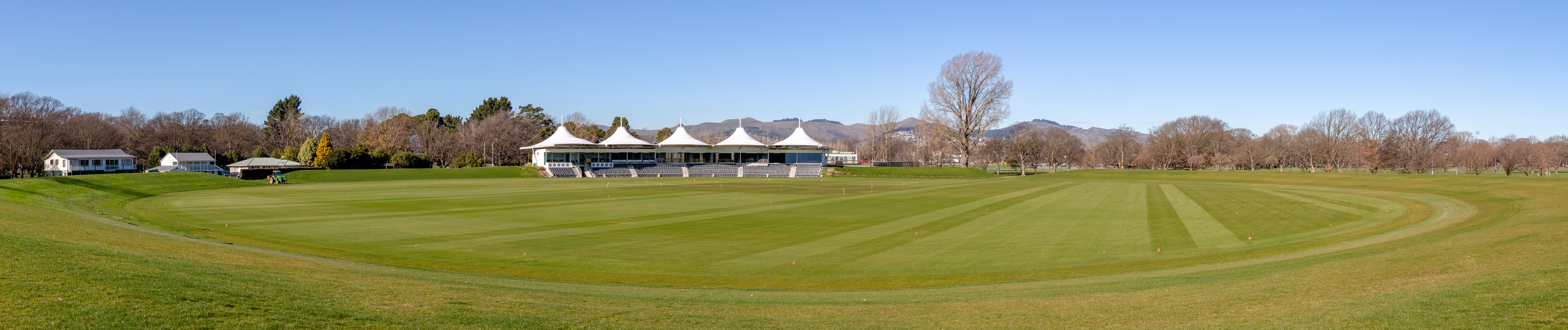
Hagley Oval in August 2019

== Hadlee Pavilion ==
The Pavilion provides a community facility which is available for community groups all year round. The Pavilion is available for other sport codes. The building was designed by Trevor Watt from leading New Zealand architects, Athfield Architects and built by Southbase Construction in less than ten months under adverse conditions.

== Canterbury Cricket Umpires' Association Pavilion ==
In 1864 this pavilion was erected on the first Canterbury Cricket Club's grounds, called Dilloway's, in order to be ready in time for the visit of an English eleven, captained by George Parr. In the match against Canterbury the English team won convincingly but were impressed by the facilities provided at the grounds at the north-western corner of South Hagley Park (by the junction of Deans and Riccarton Avenues). The well prepared field was neatly fenced and the handsome pavilion, the envy of other local clubs still using tents on match days, provided fine accommodation. Of timber construction the pavilion was built to a traditional English design and provided changing facilities, a communal area for meetings and teas, an open verandah and a viewing balcony.

Two years later the pavilion was moved to its present site on Hagley Oval where it was the home of various clubs, the last in the 1980s being Marist. By this date it had served over 120 years and there was concern as to whether it could be retained It had been altered and upgraded several times and had been declared unsafe by the City Council in 1954. The local umpires' association took over the building in 1988 with the intention of restoring it. Under the guidance of the New Zealand Historic Places Trust the building has been fully upgraded, its original appearance returned and it continues to serve a useful function for cricket in Canterbury.

Certainly the oldest cricket pavilion in New Zealand, the building may even be the oldest such structure surviving in Australasia. (Local cricketers are prepared to claim it as the oldest in the Southern Hemisphere until this can be proved incorrect!)

In December 2003 the building was registered by Heritage New Zealand as a Category 2 Building.

== Lights ==
Hagley Oval had often been overlooked for international matches on the grounds of not having any lights, and therefore not being able to hold matches that went into the evening. In 2013, resource consent was granted for four retractable lights to be installed at Hagley Oval, which was later changed to consent for six permanent lights in response to continual improvements to broadcasting standards. Approval for the lights was finalised in 2019, and a loan secured from the Christchurch City Council in May 2020.

In November 2020, the six 49m-high lights were installed, making Hagley Oval the only cricket ground on the South Island with "broadcast quality" lighting. The installation had faced some opposition from local residents, who had wanted to preserve the character of the park. The first match utilising the lights was on 10 January 2021, between Canterbury and Central Districts.

== See also ==
- List of Test cricket grounds
