= British & Irish Lions Women =

British and Irish women's rugby union team

- Unions: Rugby Football Union; Irish Rugby Football Union; Scottish Rugby Union; Welsh Rugby Union
- Founded: 2024; 2 years ago
- CEO: Ben Calveley (2024 - present)
- Coach: Jo Yapp (2027)
Team kit

First match
- British & Irish Lions Women vs France (27 August 2027)

Official website
- www.lionsrugby.com
- Current season

The British & Irish Lions is a representative rugby union team composed of players eligible for the women's national teams of England, Ireland, Scotland, and Wales. Established in 2024 as the women's counterpart to the men's team of the same name, the side is set to embark on its inaugural international tour to New Zealand in September 2027 where they will compete against the New Zealand women's national rugby union team.

== History ==
=== Formation and feasibility study ===
The creation of a British & Irish Lions women's team was the result of extensive planning and consultation. In March 2021, Royal London was announced as a partner of the British & Irish Lions and became the Principal Partner of the Women's Lions Programme, funding a feasibility study to explore the viability of establishing a women's team and tour.

A 13-person feasibility study steering group was formed, chaired by Ieuan Evans, a former British & Irish Lion and Lions board member. The group included experienced administrators from across professional rugby, business executives, and former international athletes. The study was undertaken by sports marketing agency Two Circles and examined various aspects including commercial viability, financial considerations, spectator interest, and scheduling requirements.

The study concluded with positive findings, determining that September 2027 would be the optimal time for the inaugural tour. This timing was chosen to fall within the women's international competition window and to avoid overlapping with the Men's Rugby World Cup taking place the same year.

Following the feasibility study, a tour host selection process was conducted, with New Zealand emerging as the preferred destination, due to the strength of the New Zealand national team.

=== Announcement ===
On 16 January 2024, the British & Irish Lions officially announced the formation of the women's team at an event that also unveiled the tour details and partnerships. The announcement was attended by representatives from all four constituent unions.

The CEO of the British & Irish Lions Ben Calveley, described it as "a historic milestone in our 136-year history". He emphasized that supporting the growth of women's rugby was a key strategic priority for the organization and its constituent unions, and thanked the four unions for their collaboration and World Rugby for regulatory reforms that made the 2027 tour possible.

Ieuan Evans, Chair of the British & Irish Lions and former Wales wing, called it "a key development for women's rugby and women's sport in general".

== Inaugural tour ==
=== Tour details ===
The inaugural tour, officially titled the Howden British & Irish Lions Women's Series, will take place in New Zealand in September 2027. The Lions will play three Test matches against the Black Ferns, alongside pre-Test fixtures against provincial and invitational sides.

New Zealand was selected as the host nation due to their prominence in women's rugby. The Black Ferns have won six Women's Rugby World Cups, most recently in the 2021 tournament where they defeated England 34–31 in front of over 42,000 spectators at Eden Park in Auckland.

Mark Robinson, CEO of New Zealand Rugby, stated that women's rugby was growing rapidly in New Zealand and that hosting the tour would provide players with a pinnacle event and an aspirational pathway for emerging talent.

The New Zealand government supported the bid to host the tour. Economic Development Minister Melissa Lee highlighted that hosting the event would help increase the value and visibility of women's sport in New Zealand and create new sporting heroes and role models.

In October 2026, a pre-tour fixture against France was announced. It will held on 27 August 2027 and be played at Cardiff's Millennium Stadium and be the Lion's Women first-ever match.

=== Selection and coaching ===
In May 2026, former England scrum-half and Australia head coach Jo Yapp was announced as head coach. As of May 2026, the captain for the 2027 tour have not yet been announced. Players will be selected from those eligible to represent England, Ireland, Scotland, and Wales. The development of player pathways in all four nations has been identified as a key priority in preparation for the tour.

== Kit suppliers and shirt sponsors ==
British & Irish Lions kits
Tour	Kit manufacturer	Shirt sponsor	Tour Destination	Ref
2027	Nike	Royal London	New Zealand	

== Player perspectives ==
Several prominent players from the four nations have expressed their enthusiasm for the opportunity to represent the Lions. England international Natasha Hunt described the prospect of bringing together the best people and players to create a legacy. Ireland's Beibhinn Parsons highlighted the significance of young girls being able to see women wearing the red Lions jersey, noting it was an opportunity she did not have growing up. England's Lilli Ives Campion stated it was "time to make history and shape the future".

== Tours ==
Year	To	Captain	Head coach	Top scorer in Tests	Test series result	Tests record
2027	New Zealand	TBA	Jo Yapp			
