= Canterbury Cricket Umpires' Association Pavilion =

Pavilion in Christchurch, New Zealand

Coordinates: 43°32′2.38″S 172°37′12.32″E

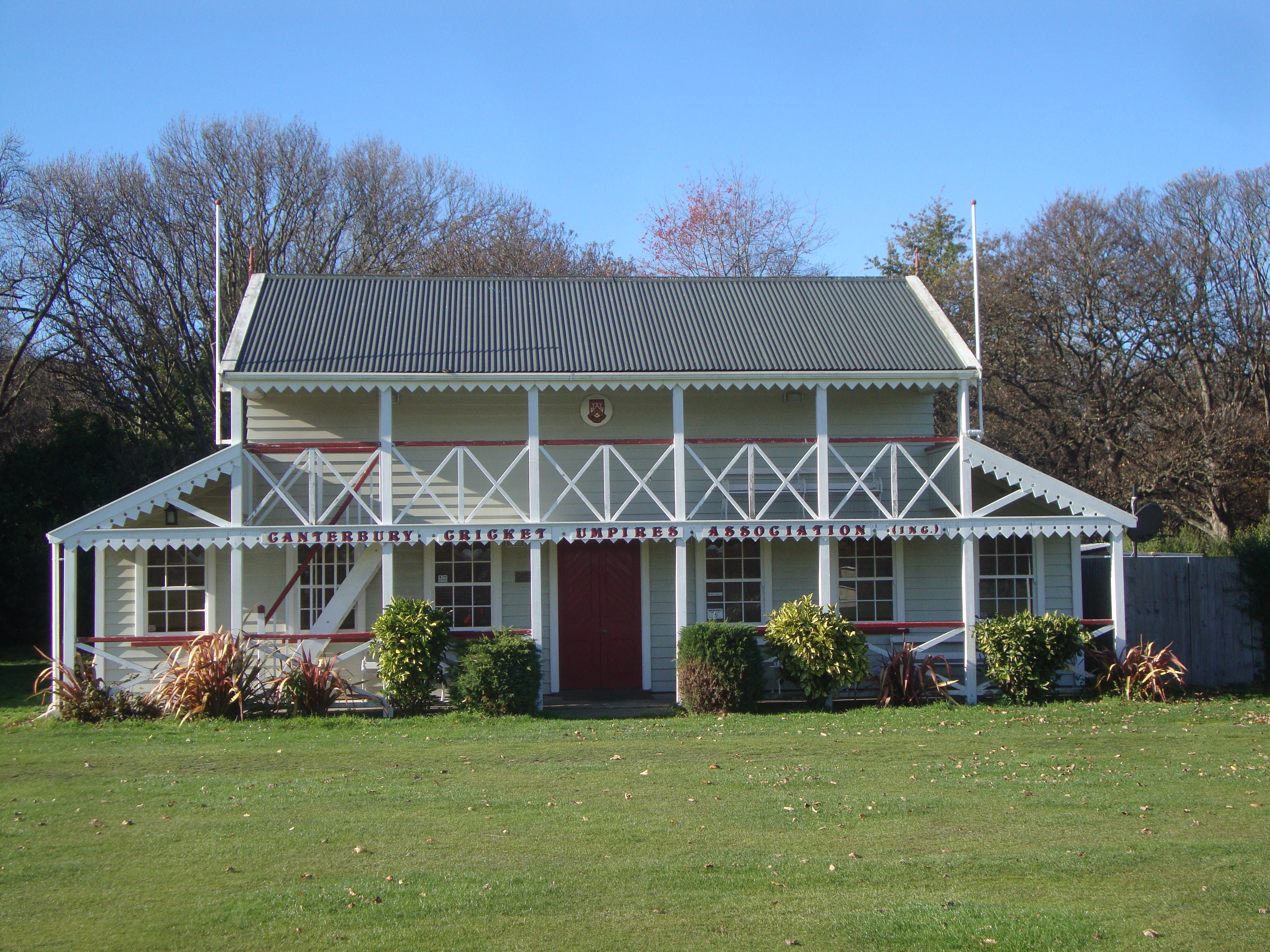
The Canterbury Cricket Umpires' Association Pavilion in May 2012

The Canterbury Cricket Umpires' Association Pavilion in Christchurch, New Zealand, is a historic cricket pavilion. Built in 1864, it was registered by Heritage New Zealand as a Category II historic place on 11 December 2003. It forms part of Hagley Oval.

== See also ==
- List of oldest buildings in Christchurch
