= Joanne Yapp =

England international rugby union player

- Born: 6 September 1979 (age 47) Shrewsbury, Shropshire, England
- Height: 1.61 m (5 ft 3 in)
- Weight: 57 kg (126 lb)

Rugby union career
- Position: Scrumhalf
Amateur team(s)
Years	Team	Apps	(Points)
- Worcester
International career
Years	Team	Apps	(Points)
1997–2009	England	70	(90)
National sevens team
Years	Team		Comps
- England
Coaching career
- Years: Team
- –2023: Worcester Warriors Women
- 2024–2025: Australia (Women)
- 2027-: British & Irish Lions Women
Medal record
Representing England
Women's rugby union
Rugby World Cup
Silver medal – second place	2006 Canada	Team competition
Silver medal – second place	2002 Spain	Team competition
Bronze medal – third place	1998 Netherlands	Team competition

Joanne Yapp (born 6 September 1979, in Shrewsbury) is an English rugby union coach and former player who grew up in the village of Clee Hill in Shropshire. She represented England at the 1998 and 2002 Rugby World Cups, and captained the side at the 2006 World Cup. She was appointed as the British & Irish Lions Women first Head Coach in May 2026.

== Rugby career ==
Yapp competed at the 1998 and 2002 Rugby World Cups. She captained the side to the 2006 World Cup final in Canada. She played her last test in 2009.

=== Coaching ===
Yapp transitioned into coaching after joining England Women's U20s program as head coach for five years. She was Worcester Warriors Women's skills coach before being promoted to director of rugby, she took the club to their sixth Premier 15s competition before they folded. She also coached the Barbarians women's team twice.

Yapp played in the qualifier for the 2009 Rugby World Cup Sevens. In 2011 she was appointed as an athlete mentor for Sky Sports Living for Sport.

Yapp was the head coach of Exeter University for eight years and led them to BUCS gold in 2013 at Twickenham and BUCS gold in sevens in 2014. She was England women's backs coach in the 2015 Women's Six Nations Championship.

In December 2023, Rugby Australia confirmed her appointment as Australia women's first female Head Coach.

In May 2026 she was appointed as the first coach for the British & Irish Lions Women. In May 2026 announced that her first game will take place on 4 September against Black Ferns XV in Whangarei.
