= Wilding Park =

Tennis facility in Christchurch, New Zealand

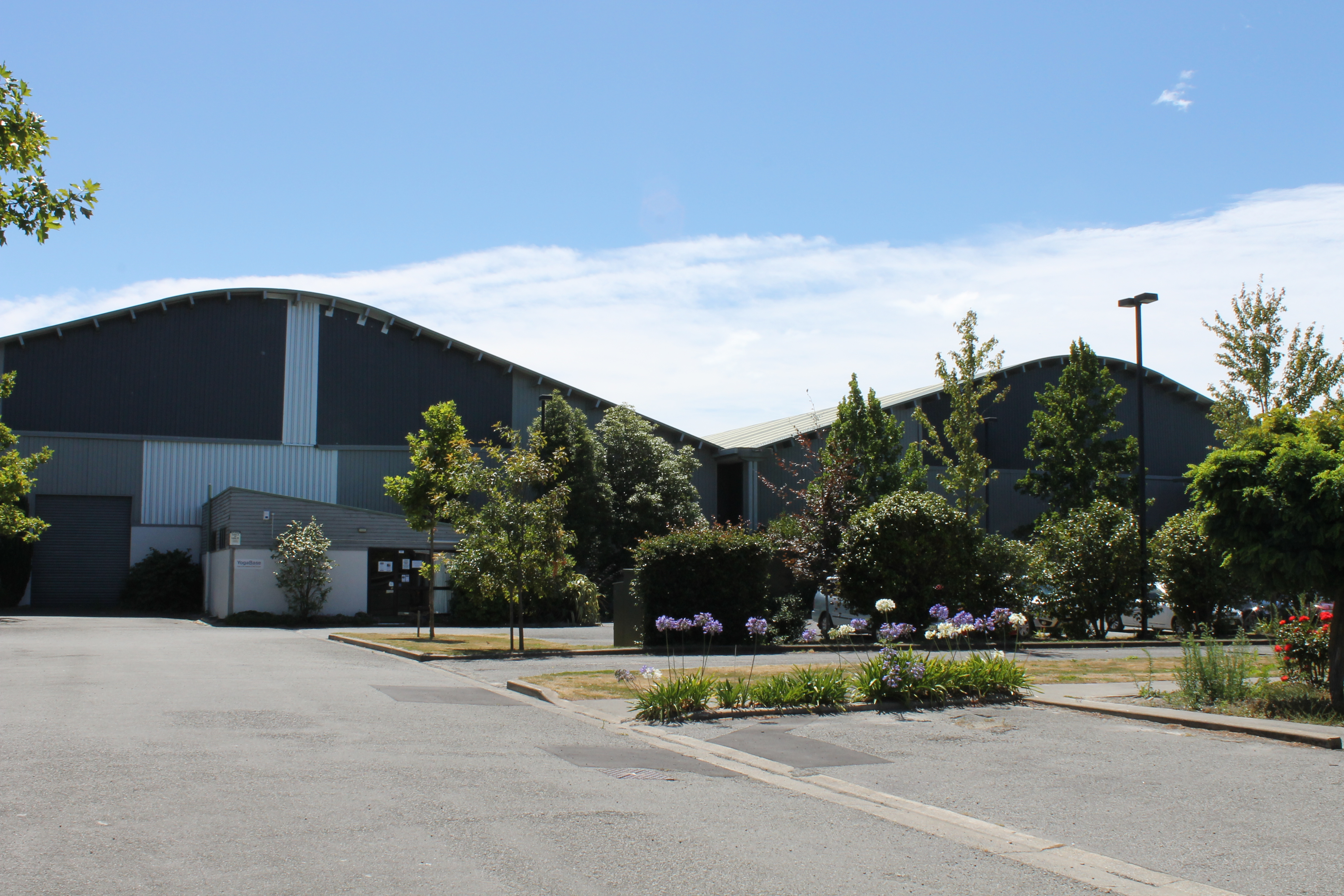
- Wilding Park indoor courts
- Interactive map of Wilding Park
- Full name: Wilding Park
- Address: Woodham Road, Avonside
- Location: Christchurch, New Zealand
- Coordinates: 43°31′26.5″S 172°40′8″E
- Owner: Wilding Park Foundation Inc

Wilding Park is a tennis facility located in Christchurch, New Zealand. The land at Wilding Park was purchased by the Canterbury Lawn Tennis Association in the early 1920s and gradually developed into a tennis centre.

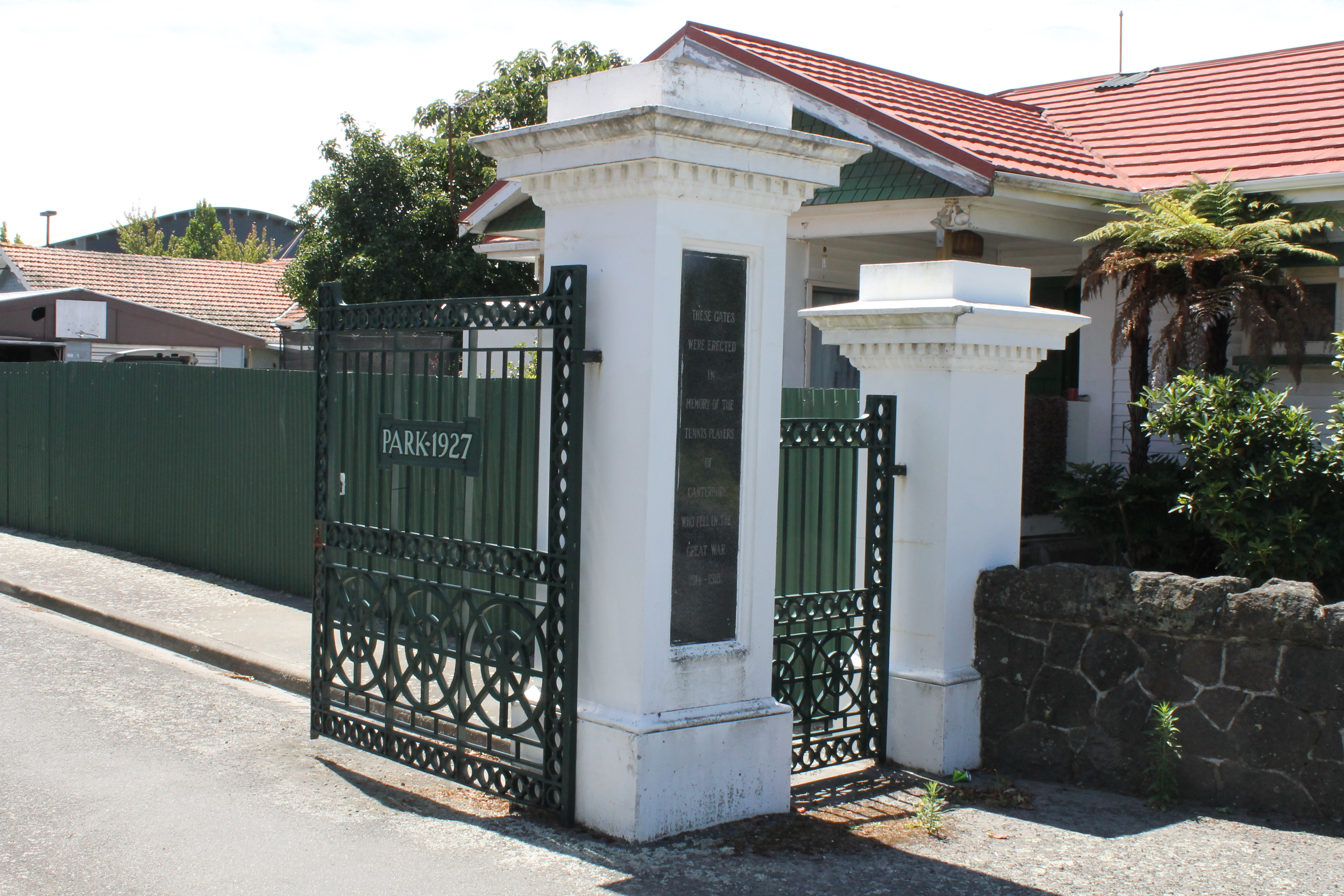
Memorial entrance gates commemorating tennis players who fell in WWI

In June 2008, during the restructure of tennis in New Zealand, the Wilding Park assets were transferred to the Wilding Park Foundation Incorporated to ensure they were held in trust in perpetuity for the tennis players of the region. From the 1970s for three decades Wilding Park was known as ‘Davis Cup City’ with most of New Zealand's home ties played there; this included many World Group ties or the earlier equivalent Zone Finals. In the last decade it has hosted annual ITF Junior Circuit events, Futures tennis tournaments, the ITF World Team Cup, ITF Super Seniors, an Asian Zone Fed Cup tournament and the 2011 ITF Seniors Championships. The Wilding Park Complex is named after Frederick Wilding, whose son, Tony Wilding, is still the only New Zealander to win a Wimbledon singles title.

Pre-earthquake, the centre had 39 courts altogether, six indoor Rebound Ace courts, twenty-five outdoor hard courts and eight natural grass courts. Its 39 courts made it the largest tennis centre in New Zealand.

== Earthquake ==
The February 2011 Christchurch earthquake had a devastating effect on the Wilding Park Complex, severely damaging all of the 39 courts as well as causing considerable damage to the buildings. Engineers undertook an assessment of the facilities and all the buildings were repairable although the courts required considerable reconstruction. The facilities re-opened in April 2013.
